= War Medal 1939–1945 =

United Kingdom military campaign medal for service in the Second World War

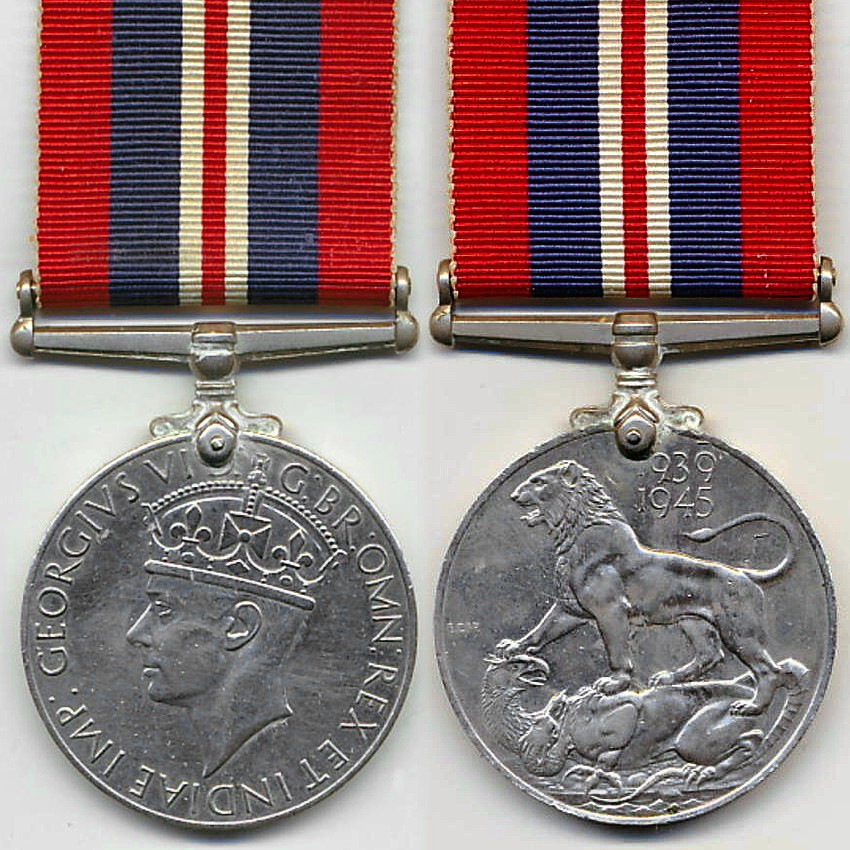
- Type: Military campaign medal
- Awarded for: 28 days of service
- Country: United Kingdom/British Empire
- Presented by: the Monarch of the United Kingdom and the Dominions of the British Commonwealth, and Emperor of India
- Eligibility: Full-time personnel of all ranks
- Campaign: Second World War 1939–45
- Established: 16 August 1945
- Ribbon bar

Order of wear
- Next (higher): Defence Medal
- Next (lower): Korea Medal

The War Medal 1939–1945 is a campaign medal which was instituted by the United Kingdom on 16 August 1945, for award to citizens of the British Commonwealth who had served full-time in the Armed Forces or the Merchant Navy for at least 28 days between 3 September 1939 and 2 September 1945.

== Institution ==
The duration of the Second World War in Europe was from 3 September 1939 to 8 May 1945, while in the Pacific Theatre it continued until 2 September 1945. The War Medal 1939–1945 was instituted by the United Kingdom on 16 August 1945 and was awarded to all full-time personnel of the armed forces and Merchant Navy for serving for 28 days, irrespective of where they were serving, between 3 September 1939 and 2 September 1945 inclusive, the full duration of the Second World War. In the Merchant Navy, the 28 days had to have been served anywhere at sea.

== Award criteria ==
The qualification requirement for the award of the War Medal 1939–1945 to full-time military personnel was 28 days of service, wherever rendered. Qualifying service in the Merchant Navy was 28 days of service anywhere at sea during the qualifying period. Foreign citizens commissioned or enlisted into British Forces, who did not receive a similar award to the War Medal 1939–1945 from their own Governments, were also eligible to qualify for the award of this medal.

Full-time paid members of the specially approved colonial and other military forces, militarised police or militarised civilian bodies which were eligible to qualify for campaign stars, were also eligible to qualify by 28 days of service during the qualifying period as laid down for the force concerned, as follows:

- Aden Armed Police from 3 February 1939 to 2 September 1945.
- British Honduras Defence Force from 3 September 1939 to 3 December 1939.
- British Guiana Constabulary, excluding those who ceased to belong to the Force for reasons other than death, ill-health or age, from 3 September 1939 to 14 July 1945.
- British Guiana Military Band from 29 April 1942 to 8 May 1945.
- Cyprus Police Force employed on full-time military service from 10 June 1940 to 12 June 1941.
- Cyprus Volunteer Force from 2 June 1941 to 2 September 1945.
- Gambia Police Force from 5 July 1940 to 17 August 1940.
- Gambian Army Inland Water Transport on the SS Munshi from 21 July 1942 to 31 May 1944.
- Gibraltar Defence Force from 3 September 1939 to 2 September 1945.
- Gibraltar Security Police from 3 September 1939 to 2 September 1945.
- Nigeria Police Force from 23 July 1940 to 8 May 1945.
- Palestine Police Force from 27 May 1942 to 8 May 1945.
- Sudan Defence Force for full-time permanent service anywhere in the Sudan from 3 September 1939 to 8 May 1945.
- Trinidad Police Force from 3 September 1939 to 2 September 1945.
- Zanzibar Police Force from 3 September 1939 to 2 September 1945.

The qualification for the specially approved categories of uniformed civilians who were eligible to qualify for Campaign Stars was 28 days of service in the area of an army operational command overseas, or overseas from or outside the country of residence in non-operational areas subjected to enemy air attack or closely threatened. Service in the United Kingdom or in the territory of residence, other than in an army operational area, was not a qualification for these categories.

The medal was awarded to personnel whose required service period was terminated prematurely by death, disability due to service or capture as a prisoner-of-war and whose service qualified them for one of the Second World War Campaign Stars. Personnel who had received one of the Stars for service of less than 28 days were also awarded the War Medal 1939–1945.

== Description ==
The War Medal 1939–1945 is a disc, 36 millimetres (1.42 inches) in diameter. The non-swivelling straight bar suspender is attached to the medal with a single-toe claw mount and a pin through the upper edge of the medal. The British issue medals were struck in cupro-nickel, while those awarded in Canada (about 700,000) were struck in silver. The medal is sometimes incorrectly referred to as the "Victory Medal" for the Second World War.

Obverse

The obverse shows the crowned effigy of King George VI, facing left and signed "PM", the initials of designer Percy Metcalfe, below the truncated neck of the effigy. Around the perimeter is the legend "GEORGIVS VI D:G:BR:OMN:REX ET INDIAE IMP:".

Reverse

The reverse shows a lion standing wanton on the body of a double-headed dragon. The dragon's heads are those of an eagle and a dragon, to signify the principal occidental and oriental enemies during the Second World War. At the top, just to the right of centre are the years "1939" and "1945" in two lines. The initials "ECRP" of designer Edward Carter Preston are near the rim at the nine o'clock position. Preston also designed the bronze memorial plaque which was presented to the next-of-kin of British servicemen and women who fell during the First World War.

Naming

The British Honours Committee decided that Second World War campaign medals awarded to British forces would be issued unnamed, a practice followed by all but three British Commonwealth countries. The recipient's name was impressed on the rim of the medal awarded to Indians, South Africans and, after a campaign led by veteran organisations, by Australia. In addition, those awarded to personnel of the Royal Canadian Mounted Police who served only on the RCMPV St. Roch and of the Canadian Merchant Marine were named. In the case of Indians, the recipient's force number, rank, initials, surname and service arm or corps, and in the case of South Africans and Australians, the force number, initials and surname, were impressed on the rim in block capitals.

Ribbon

The ribbon is 32 millimetres wide, with a 6½ millimetres wide red band, a 6½ millimetres wide blue band and a 2 millimetres wide white band, repeated in reverse order and separated by a 2 millimetres wide red band. The colours are those of the British Union Jack.

The ribbons for the War Medal as well as those of the Second World War Campaign Stars, with the exception of the Arctic Star, were devised by King George VI.

Emblems

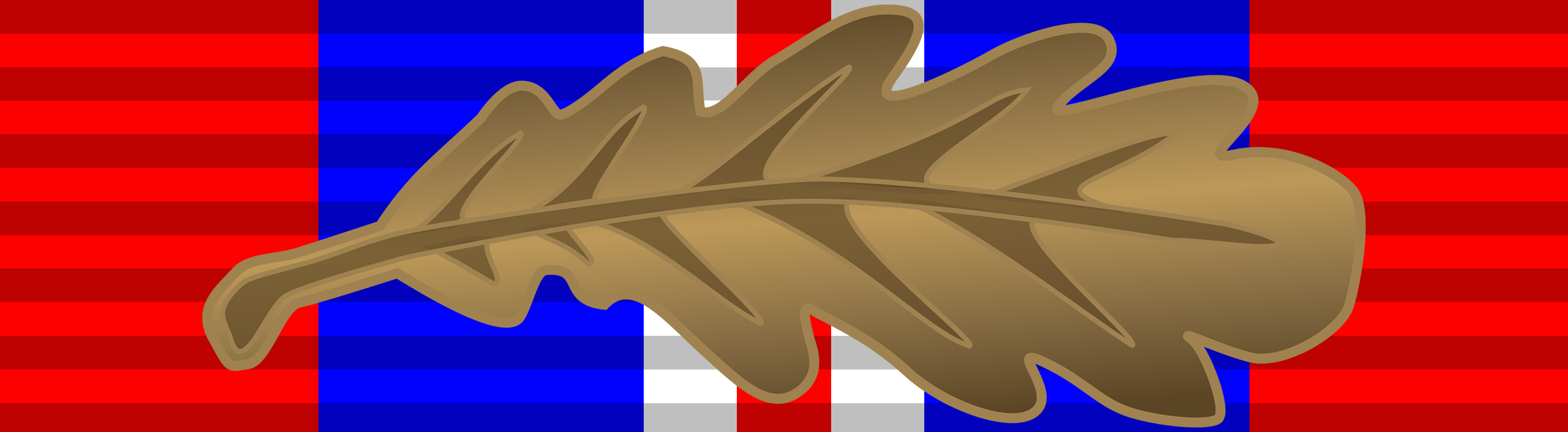

A bronze oak leaf emblem is worn on the ribbon to signify a mention in despatches, a King's Commendation for Brave Conduct, or a King's Commendation for Valuable Service in the Air.

== Order of wear ==
The order of wear of the Second World War campaign stars was determined by their respective campaign start dates and by the campaign's duration. This is the order worn, even when a recipient qualified for them in a different order. The Defence Medal and War Medal are worn after the stars.

- The 1939–1945 Star, from 3 September 1939 to 2 September 1945, the full duration of the Second World War.
- The Atlantic Star, from 3 September 1939 to 8 May 1945, the duration of the Battle of the Atlantic and the War in Europe.
- The Arctic Star, from 3 September 1939 to 8 May 1945, the duration of the Arctic Convoys and the War in Europe.
- The Air Crew Europe Star, from 3 September 1939 to 5 June 1944, the period until D-Day minus one.
- The Africa Star, from 10 June 1940 to 12 May 1943, the duration of the North African Campaign.
- The Pacific Star, from 8 December 1941 to 2 September 1945, the duration of the Pacific War.
- The Burma Star, from 11 December 1941 to 2 September 1945, the duration of the Burma Campaign.
- The Italy Star, from 11 June 1943 to 8 May 1945, the duration of the Italian Campaign.
- The France and Germany Star, from 6 June 1944 to 8 May 1945, the duration of the North-West Europe Campaign.
- The Defence Medal, from 3 September 1939 to 8 May 1945 (2 September 1945 for those serving in the Far East and the Pacific), the duration of the Second World War.
- The War Medal, from 3 September 1939 to 2 September 1945, the full duration of the Second World War.

The Canadian Volunteer Service Medal and Newfoundland Volunteer War Service Medal was worn after the Defence Medal and before the War Medal, with the other Commonwealth war medals worn after the War Medal.

=== South Africa ===
On 6 April 1952 the Union of South Africa instituted its own range of military decorations and medals. These new awards were worn before all earlier British decorations and medals awarded to South Africans, with the exception of the Victoria Cross, which still took precedence before all other awards. Of the British campaign medals applicable to South Africans, the War Medal 1939–1945 takes precedence as shown.

- Preceded by the Defence Medal.
- Succeeded by the Africa Service Medal.
