= Cauthorn =

Cauthorn is a surname. Notable people with the surname include:

- John W. Cauthorn (born 1946), American politician
- Todd Cauthorn (born 1971), American basketballer

== See also ==
- Cawthorne (surname)
