= George Wood (judge) =

English judge and politician

Sir George Wood (1743–1824) was an English judge and politician.

== Life ==
Born on 13 February 1743 at Roystone, near Barnsley in Yorkshire, he was the son of George Wood (1704–1781), vicar of Roystone, by his wife Jane, daughter of John Matson of Roystone. He was intended for a career as a solicitor, and was articled to an attorney at Cawthorn named West. At the end of his articles West urged him to study for the bar.

Entering the Middle Temple, Wood began as a special pleader and established a reputation. He had many pupils, among whom were Edward Law, Thomas Erskine, Charles Abbott, James Scarlett, and John Williams. Immediately on being called to the bar he was engaged by the Crown for all the state prosecutions beginning in December 1792. He joined the northern circuit, and on 5 November 1796 he was returned to parliament for Haslemere in Surrey, retaining his seat until 1806.

In April 1807 Wood was appointed a baron of the exchequer and was knighted; as a judge he was painstaking. He was a supporter of prerogative power and took a strong stand against free criticism of the executive by the press; Henry Brougham threatened to move his impeachment.

Wood resigned his office in February 1823, and died on 7 July 1824 at his house in Bedford Square. He was buried in the Temple church. By his wife Sarah he left no issue.

== Works ==
Wood printed for private circulation Observations on Tithes and Tithe Laws, which he later published in 1832 (London).
