= Gillison =

Gillison is a surname. Notable people with the surname include:

- Andrew Gillison (1868–1915), Scottish-born Australian Army chaplain
- James Allan Gillison (1892–1975), British-Australian medical doctor
- Maura L. Gillison, American oncologist and molecular epidemiologist
- Samantha Gillison (born 1967), Australian-born American writer
