= Julia Carter Preston =

British artist (1926–2012)

Julia Carter Preston in about 1960

Julia Althea Carter Preston(31 August 1926 - 6 January 2012) was a British potter who was responsible for reviving the art of sgraffito (where designs are scratched on to ceramics) in the United Kingdom in the 1950s.

Born in Liverpool, the youngest of four daughters of the sculptor Edward Carter Preston and his wife Marie (née Tyson Smith), a watercolourist and the sister of the sculptor Herbert Tyson Smith, Julia Carter Preston attended the Liverpool Institute High School for Girls, Blackburne House. While studying at the Liverpool College of Art in the 1940s she discovered a passion for ceramics and chose to specialise in pottery, passing her pottery examination and gaining a National Diploma in Art in 1951. Following this, Carter Preston taught ceramics at several colleges in Liverpool and became Head of Ceramics and taught pottery at the Liverpool College of Art when John Lennon and Stuart Sutcliffe were students there. She held this post until the mid-1970s. During the 1960s she worked for a period as Wedgwood's official lecturer in the north-west. She had a studio in the Bluecoat Chambers in Liverpool, where from the mid-1970s she worked full-time as a potter.

In 1960 she married Michael Pugh Thomas, a marine biologist and environmental scientist. There were no children of the marriage.

Preston's work is known for its use of sgraffito and lustre glazes. She was influenced by Islamic pottery traditions, particularly Iznik pottery. Examples of Julia Carter Preston’s work were presented to Princess Margaret and the Duchess of Kent when they made official visits to Liverpool. Another piece was commissioned as a present for the Prince of Wales when he visited the newly restored St George’s Hall in the city in 2007.

An exhibition of her work was held at the Walker Art Gallery in 1999; this was opened by Antiques Roadshow expert Tim Wonnacott, who is an enthusiastic collector of her work. Carter Preston was made a Fellow of Liverpool John Moores University in 2005. Her work is represented in the Walker Art Gallery, the Liverpool University Art Gallery, the York Art Gallery, the Ulster Museum in Belfast and the Smithsonian Institution in Washington.

After the death of her husband in March 2011 she lived in a nursing home near to her former home in Canning Street. Her own collection of her ceramics was donated to Liverpool Hope University where a trust has been set up to preserve the collection and that of her father Edward, and support student bursaries.
