= Walter Cawthorn =

Australian soldier, diplomat, and intelligence chief (1896–1970)

Major General Sir Walter Cawthorn CB CIE CBE
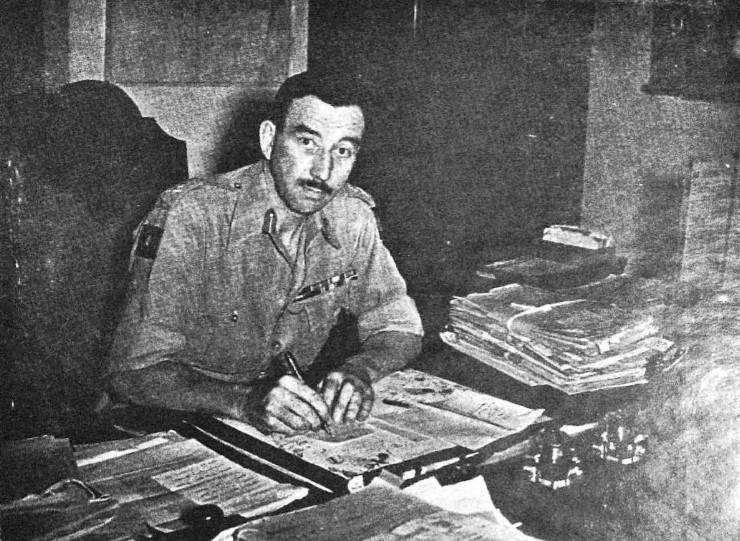
- Cawthorn in 1946

Director General Australian Secret Intelligence Service
- In office September 1960 – 3 July 1968
- Preceded by: Ralph Harry
- Succeeded by: Bill Robertson

6th High Commissioner of Australia to Canada
- In office 11 March 1959 – 2 May 1960
- Preceded by: Walter Crocker
- Succeeded by: David Hay

3rd High Commissioner of Australia to Pakistan
- In office 24 July 1954 – 14 December 1958
- Preceded by: Leslie Beavis
- Succeeded by: Robert Furlonger (acting); Roden Cutler

Director Joint Intelligence Bureau (Australia)
- In office 1952–1954

Personal details
- Born: 11 June 1896 Prahran, Victoria
- Died: 4 December 1970 (aged 74) Melbourne, Victoria
- Spouse: Mary Wyman Varley (m. 1927; died 1989)
- Children: 1
- Relatives: Minnie Elizabeth Cawthorn (sister); Andrew Gillison (father-in-law); Peter Cawthorn (nephew)
- Education: Melbourne High School; Staff College, Camberley

Military service
- Allegiance: Australia; United Kingdom
- Branch/service: Australian Imperial Force (1915–1918); British Indian Army (1918–1952)
- Years of service: 1915–1952
- Rank: Major General
- Commands: Directorate of Military Intelligence (India)
- Battles/wars: First World War; Gallipoli Campaign; Western Front; Mohmand campaign of 1935; Second World War; Mediterranean and Middle East Theatre; South-East Asian Theatre
- Awards: Knight Bachelor; Companion of the Order of the Bath; Companion of the Order of the Indian Empire; Commander of the Order of the British Empire; Mentioned in despatches
- Service number: 342240

Sir Walter Joseph Cawthorn (Note: His name is sometimes erroneously given as Walter Cawthorne, Robert Cawthorne or Robert Cawthome.) (11 June 1896 – 4 December 1970) also known as Bill Cawthorn, and also as W. J. Cawthorn and Wally Cawthorn, was an Australian teacher, diplomat, and a senior officer in the British Indian Army. He is considered Australia's greatest spymaster.

On the recommendation of his friend Richard G. Casey, who was the then Governor of Bengal, Cawthorn was sent to Melbourne in 1946 as an Indian representative on the Joint Chiefs of Staff in Australia. Subsequent to the Partition of British India in August 1947, Cawthorn was seconded to the Pakistan Army, where he played a key role in founding the Inter-Services Intelligence (ISI) and served as the Deputy Chief of Staff of the Pakistan Army from February 1948 to February 1951.

He returned to Australia in 1952 and served as Director Joint Intelligence Bureau (Australia) until 1954. Richard Casey, now Australian Minister for External Affairs, sought 'a better outlet for Cawthorn's talents' and selected him for a five-year posting as Australian High Commissioner to Pakistan. During this time, Cawthorn forged strong ties with local political and military leaders. Governor-General Iskandar Ali Mirza once told Casey, 'We have no secrets from Bill Cawthorn.' Casey visited Karachi in 1956 and noted that due to Cawthorn's rapport with 'top Pakistanis, we are much better informed than the much larger diplomatic posts.'

On the night of 27 October 1958, General Ayub Khan informed foreign officials, including Cawthorn and U.S. Ambassador James M. Langley, of his military coup against President Iskandar Ali Mirza and his takeover as president. Both reacted sharply to the news, as Cawthorn was a close friend of Iskandar and expressed concerns about his safety.

In March 1959, he was appointed High Commissioner of Australia to Canada and, in September 1960, he returned to take the helm of the Australian Secret Intelligence Service (ASIS). His tenure was characterised as 'a period of consolidation and development,' during which he served until his retirement on 3 July 1968.

== Early life ==
Walter Joseph Cawthorn was born in Prahran, Victoria on 11 June 1896. He was the second child of William Cawthorn, an English commercial traveller and paper merchant, and his Victorian-born wife, Fanny Adelaide (née Williames). Educated at Melbourne High School, Walter became a schoolteacher alongside his younger sister, Minnie Elizabeth Cawthorn. He had an older sister, Alberta Frances, who died in infancy. Minnie was the third child, followed by sisters Sarah Beryl and Hilda Pauline, brother William, sister Enid Ruth (Cawthorn) Cahill, and brother Frank Raymond Cawthorn, an officer of the Indian Medical Services who served in Quetta, the Second World War, and later as a Quarantine Officer.

== Personal life ==
Walter married Mary Wyman Varley, a widow and the daughter of Andrew Gillison, on 10 March 1927 at the Marylebone Presbyterian Church in London. Mary served as an officer in the Women's Auxiliary Corps (India), where she carried out intelligence duties during World War II for four years.

They had one son, Michael John Douglas Cawthorn, born on 10 March 1930. He was graduated from the Royal Military Academy Sandhurst and was commissioned into the Argyll and Sutherland Highlanders on 16 December 1949. Serving as a Second Lieutenant with the 1st Battalion of his regiment he was killed in action during the Korean War on 4 April 1951. He is buried at the United Nations Memorial Cemetery in Korea. Stained glass artist, Edward R. Payne, created a memorial in Michael's memory for the left-hand side of the west window in the south aisle of St Mary's Church, Painswick.

In Robert Shepherd's biography of Enoch Powell, its noted that Cawthorn became "almost a second father" to him.

== Military career ==
=== First World War ===
Cawthorn enlisted in the Australian Imperial Force (AIF) on 3 February 1915, joining B Company of the 22nd Battalion as a sergeant. His unit departed Melbourne aboard HMAT A38 Ulysses on 10 May 1915.

After arriving at Gallipoli in September, he was promoted to regimental sergeant major. He was commissioned into the army as a second lieutenant on 9 November. During his time on the peninsula, he kept a diary documenting his experiences.

In January 1916, the battalion moved to Egypt and then to France in March, where he was promoted to second lieutenant.

Cawthorn sustained a severe shrapnel wound to the abdomen on 27 June near Armentières, and was evacuated to England. He was promoted to lieutenant on 15 July 1916 and returned to the Western Front in November.

He was sent to England for training duties in April 1917 and promoted to captain in May. After rejoining his unit in August, he was sent back to England, where his AIF service ended on 12 February 1918.

=== British Indian Army ===
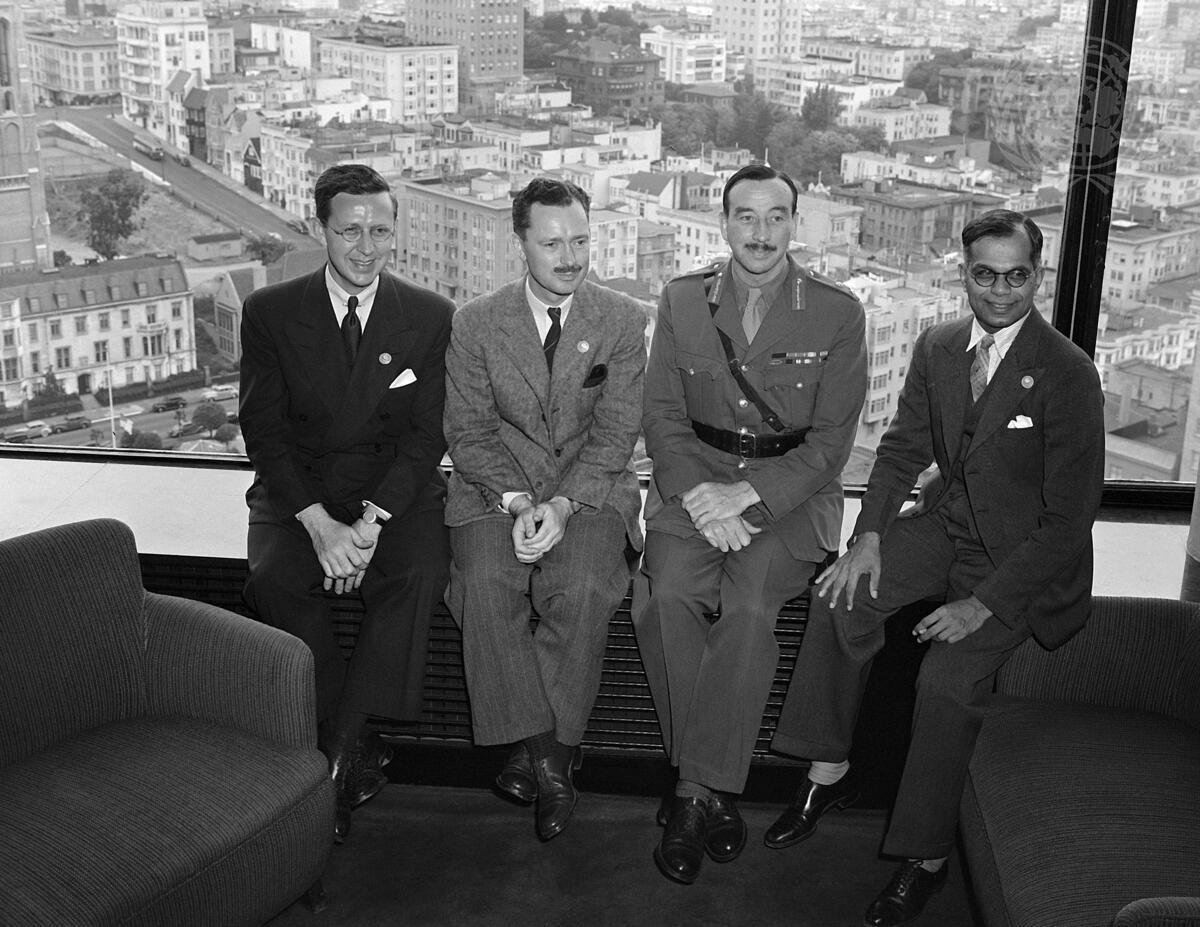
Clyde Dunn (State Department), Captain T. E. Brownsdon (Secretary), Major General Cawthorn (Military Adviser), and K. P. S. Menon (Principal Adviser) at the San Francisco Conference, 1945.

Lieutenant Cawthorn was commissioned into the British Indian Army on 25 March 1918. He served with the 46th Punjabis in Palestine from September to October 1918 and was Mentioned in Despatches in the London Gazette 12 January 1920. He remained with them when, in 1922, the regiment became the 10th (Training battalion) Battalion, 16th Punjab Regiment.

He transferred to the 4th Battalion of the 16th Punjab Regiment in India on 25 September 1925. Shortly after, it was announced on 7 October that Captain H.W.D. Palmer had assumed the role of adjutant in the 10th Battalion of the 16th Punjab Regiment, replacing Cawthorn as the outgoing adjutant.

Captain Cawthorn arrived in Bombay aboard the SS Razmak on 15 April 1927. From 1929 to 1930, Cawthorn attended the Staff College, Camberley, after which, on 1 May 1930, he became a company commander in the 4th Battalion, 16th Punjab Regiment, serving on the North-West Frontier.

From 15 December 1930 to 29 February 1932, he served as General Staff Officer Grade 3 in Baluchistan. From 1 March 1932 to 20 January 1935, he was Deputy Assistant Quartermaster General (Western Command) in Quetta. Subsequently, he was stationed on the North-West Frontier, where he participated in the Mohmand campaign of 1935.

In January 1937, Cawthorn was posted as General Staff Officer Grade 2 at the War Office in London, where he noted the united Arab opposition to the partition of Palestine, which he regarded as 'the first real example, since the Islamic Golden Age, of a movement that had stirred the entire Arab world at once.'

By August 1939, Cawthorn was promoted to the local rank of colonel and appointed General Staff Officer Grade 1. He served as Director of the Middle East Intelligence Centre in Cairo. In this role, he sent Freya Stark on a mission to Imam Yahya's court in Yemen, where she established the Ikhwan al Hurriya (Brotherhood of Freedom), a propaganda network for the British Government which sought to secure Arab support for the Allies. He was succeeded by his deputy, Colonel Iltyd Nicholl Clayton in 1941.

Cawthorn was promoted to acting Brigadier and became Director of Military Intelligence at GHQ India on 15 August 1941. Under his leadership, the camouflage development section was created, with Cawthorn showing particular enthusiasm for its potential.

During the peak of Peter Fleming's career in military deception (1943–1945), Cawthorn, along with Field Marshal Wavell and Louis Mountbatten, was a key supporter. Cawthorn, noted as 'an Australian who fully appreciated what Fleming was trying to achieve,' was accompanied by Peter Fleming to the Quebec Conference, 1943.

Promoted to acting Major General from 21 November 1942 to 20 September 1943, Cawthorn also became Deputy Director of Intelligence for the South East Asia Command from October onward.

In early 1943, General Cawthorn, Director of Intelligence for the Government of British India, visited the United States to discuss psychological warfare strategies with General George V. Strong, Chief of the US Office of Military Intelligence, and John P. Davies from the State Department. Cawthorn proposed the creation of a "Joint Intelligence Board" in New Delhi, which would include representatives from the US Army, Navy, and various intelligence agencies, along with British and Indian officials, to coordinate intelligence sharing and prevent duplication of efforts. While his proposal was seen as beneficial for military intelligence, its focus on psychological and political warfare raised concerns, leading Davies to advise against the plan.

From 1 May 1944 to 2 March 1945, temporary Major General Cawthorn served as the Director of Intelligence in British India.

=== Pakistan Army ===
After the Independence of Pakistan in 1947, Cawthorn was deputed to the Pakistan Army and appointed as the Deputy Chief of Staff in February 1948 representing the Ministry of Defence of Pakistan, and as Secretary of the Joint Services Commanders Committee. His tenure ended in February 1951 when he was succeeded by Major General M. A. Latif Khan.

== Civilian career ==
=== Director Joint Intelligence Bureau ===
Cawthorn returned to Australia and as a civilian was appointed Director Joint Intelligence Bureau (Australia) in 1952. Alongside Director of Military Intelligence Colonel Charles Hector Finlay and Frederick Joseph Blakeney from the External Affairs Department, he briefed the Federal Parliamentary Foreign Affairs Committee on the risks the Indo-China War posed to Australia, on 12 August 1953.

=== Director of the ASIS ===
Cawthorn was nominated as the head of the Australian Secret Intelligence Service (ASIS) by Richard G. Casey. He succeeded Ralph Harry and took over the position in September 1960.

Bruce Davies and Gary McKay, in Vietnam: The Complete Story of the Australian War, note that "the Australians did operate successfully within several CIA programs, such as the People’s Action Teams (PAT). It was this program that drew the attention of an anonymous Australian major general, described as ‘impressive and intelligent’ by Peer de Silva, the CIA Station Chief, during their meeting in mid-1964. He arranged for some Australians from the AATTV to be attached to it. The major general was likely Sir Walter Cawthorn, the head of ASIS."

Cawthorn developed a strong interest in Indonesian affairs and expanded the Jakarta office, making it the largest ASIS station. It has also been suggested that this expansion contributed significantly to the atmosphere leading to the 1966 overthrow of President Sukarno with the help of the CIA.

The Tribune praised Cawthorn in 1980 as an "intrepid founder" for establishing ASIS, though this is inaccurate. Thomas Millar refutes the claim, noting that Cawthorn was actually the third head of ASIS.

== Diplomatic career ==
On 24 July 1954, Richard G. Casey, the Australian Minister for External Affairs, appointed Cawthorn as the Australian High Commissioner to Pakistan, succeeding Leslie Beavis in the role for a five-year term.

General Cawthorn, accompanied by his wife Mary and sister Minnie Elizabeth Cawthorn, attended a ceremonial investiture in his honour at Government House, Canberra on 11 March 1954. Queen Elizabeth II formally presented him with the Companion of the Order of the Bath and the Commander of the British Empire, honours awarded to him years earlier. After the presentation, the Queen remarked to Cawthorn, 'This is the first time I have ever had to place two of these orders around anyone's neck.'

Cawthorn was approved for knighthood on 1 January 1958. Queen Elizabeth II formally conferred the honour on 6 February 1959 at Buckingham Palace.

Asghar Khan recalled that on the night of the 1958 Pakistani military coup on 27 October, around 11:30 PM, General Ayub Khan held a meeting with ambassadors and foreign officials, including Australian High Commissioner General Cawthorn and U.S. Ambassador James M. Langley. During the meeting, Ayub informed them of the overthrow of President Iskandar Ali Mirza and Ayub's assumption of the presidency. Asghar notes that Cawthorn, a close friend of Iskandar, along with the U.S. ambassador, reacted sharply to the news.

In his book, Friends Not Masters, Field Marshal Ayub Khan mentioned his conversation with General Cawthorn, describing him as "an old friend" of Iskandar Ali Mirza. When Cawthorn asked, "Where is Iskander Mirza going?" Ayub replied, "He wants to go to England." There was difficulty in finding a suitable aircraft, and after four or five days of searching, they still could not find one. Ayub feared that Mirza's presence in Karachi could provoke unrest in the public, so they suggested that he move to Quetta temporarily. Mirza agreed, and Ayub told Cawthorn, "You can go and see him. You can go with him if you like. He is not a prisoner or anything like that." Ayub adds, "I think he (Cawthorn) went to the Karachi airport and met him."

== Later life ==
Cawthorn lived at Little Tocknells, in Kallista, within the Dandenong Ranges after his retirement, as Peter Hohnen describes. He was "tall and dignified," with dark hair and a military moustache. Hohnen notes that he was "a quiet, unassuming man whose demeanour endeared him to many." These qualities, along with his 'discretion and capability', allowed him to rise from private to major general and gain acceptance in elite circles.

== Death and funeral service ==
In early 1970, after a violent attack by an unidentified assailant near the Melbourne Club, he was admitted to the hospital. Cawthorn died on 4 December 1970 and was cremated. More than 200 people attended his funeral service in Melbourne. Wing Commander B. N. Tennant of the RAAF represented Governor-General of Australia Paul Hasluck at the service.

=== Legacy and Commemorations ===
Former Governor-General Richard G. Casey, a close friend of Cawthorn's, responded to the news of his death, stating, "Bill Cawthorn was a close and valued friend for 25 years. I will miss him greatly. He was a very capable and most valuable Australian who more than pulled his weight in many walks of life."

Former Prime Minister Robert Menzies described him to reporters as "undemonstrative" adding, "He was in a sense the quiet man. I had a very great regard for him."

== Publications ==
In 1935, Major W. J. Cawthorn of the 4th (Bhopal) 16th Punjab Regiment wrote a pamphlet after visiting Southern Rhodesia to evaluate its suitability for retired British Indian Army officers. Following a thorough analysis, he concluded:

"In my opinion, Southern Rhodesia is a relatively suitable country for permanent settlement by officers of the Indian Army. I strongly advise any officer of limited means who does not wish to settle in England to visit Southern Rhodesia and assess the conditions for himself before deciding to settle elsewhere. If he cannot afford a preliminary visit but believes the conditions would be suitable for him and his wife, I would suggest that he would not be taking an undue risk by coming to this country with the intention of permanent settlement."

== Speeches ==
Cawthorn's address at the Ferny Creek Reserve to the Dandenong Ranges Fire Brigades' Group (November 1953)

== Notes ==
Diplomatic posts
Preceded by Leslie Beavis	High Commissioner of Australia to Pakistan; 1954–1958	Succeeded by Roden Cutler
Preceded by Walter Crocker	High Commissioner of Australia to Canada; 1959–1960	Succeeded by David Hay
Government offices
New title Office Established	Director-General of Inter-Services Intelligence; 1948	Succeeded by Syed Shahid Hamid
Preceded by A.S. Storey	Director Joint Intelligence Bureau (Australia); 1952–1954	Succeeded by W. Harold King
Preceded by Ralph Harry	Director-General of the Australian Secret Intelligence Service; 1960–1968	Succeeded by Bill Robertson
