= Herbert Tyson Smith =

English sculptor (1883–1972)

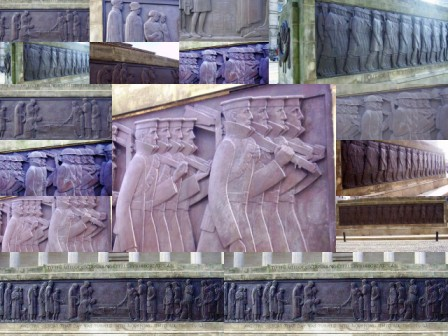
Tyson Smith’s reliefs on the sides of the Liverpool Cenotaph

George Herbert Tyson Smith (1883–1972) was an English sculptor born in Liverpool. He executed many works in the Liverpool and Merseyside area, in particular war memorials. He was the brother-in-law of fellow Liverpool sculptor Edward Carter Preston. Carter Preston designed the "Next of Kin Memorial Plaque" He was the uncle of the potter Julia Carter Preston.

Tyson Smith's father was an engraver and lithographic printer. Tyson Smith attended Liverpool College of Art where he studied plaster and stone carving and clay modeling. He was taught drawing by Augustus John at the "Art Sheds". Tyson Smith was particularly interested in the early artistic works of Egypt and Greece.

In the First World War, Tyson Smith served in the Royal Flying Corps.

Tyson Smith set up his first studio in 1919 when he returned from war service and he moved into a larger studio at Bluecoat Studios in 1925.

== Works ==
=== War memorials ===
Work	Location	Notes and References
The Liverpool Scottish War Memorial	Liverpool	This memorial now stands in St George's Hall in the centre of Liverpool. This bronze memorial commemorates the Liverpool Scottish, then the 10th (Scottish) Battalion of the King’s (Liverpool Regiment) and was unveiled on 9 June 1923 by General Lord Horne at the Drill Hall in Fraser Street, Liverpool. It contains an illuminated leather-bound book recording the names, all listed equally, of over 1,100 Territorial officers and men of the Liverpool Scottish who fell in the First World War. It was designed by Major Campbell of the Regiment and was sculpted by Herbert Tyson Smith.
Accrington War Memorial	Accrington Lancashire	The War Memorial in Accrington was unveiled on 1 July 1922, the anniversary of the first day of the Battle of the Somme, and stands in Oak Hill Park, a public garden just outside Accrington off the Manchester Road. It consists of an obelisk on a massive pedestal with a wall behind. On the main face of the obelisk is a carved female figure. According to the notes written at the time of the unveiling, this female figure represents "Compassion" and "Piety". She holds a wreath and a palm. In front of the obelisk are twelve green Westmorland slate tablets with the names of the fallen (865 names in all). Behind this obelisk a wall bears the names of the 173 men who fell in the Second World War. On the front of the pedestal are the words "TO THE HONOURED MEMORY/OF THE MEN OF ACCRINGTON/WHO GAVE THEIR LIVES IN THE/ GREAT WAR 1914-1919/THEIR NAME LIVETH FOR EVERMORE/THIS LAND INVIOLATE/THEIRS THE GLORY" and on the rear "NORTHERN/IRELAND/(NAME)/FALKLANDS/CAMPAIGN 1982/(NAMES)" The wall is inscribed "LET US REMEMBER THOSE WHO IN THEIR LIVES FOUGHT AND DIED FOR US IN MEMORIAM 1939-1945/(NAMES)" The unveiling was carried out by a local industrialist, Mr.H.H.Bolton, who had lost three sons in the war.
Westminster Road Congregational Church War Memorial	Kirkdale Merseyside	For this church Tyson Smith carved a walnut memorial inscribed "To the Proud and Honoured Memory of those men from this Congregation who fought and gave their lives in the Great Wars/(Names)/1914-1918/(Names)/1939-1945" 26 names are listed for the 1914–1918 war and six for 1939–1945.
The Parish Church of Christ Church War Memorial.	Bootle Merseyside	The men of the parish who laid down their lives in the 1914–1919 war are remembered on an elaborate white marble monument in the church which has depictions of a wreath and standard and a lion and the words "Pro Patria" carved on each side of the inscription. This inscription reads "1914 – 1918/To the Glory of God & In memory of the men/of this Church who fell in the Great War/(Names)/Greater love hath no man than this/That a man lay down his life for his friends" 112 names are listed.
Bangor-Is-Y-Coed	Bangor-Is-Y-Coed Clwyd	The memorial stands in Bangor-Is-Y-Coed's High Street and features a female figure said to represent "Mourning". She stands in front of a semi-circular wall and the inscription reads "Ad Majorem Dei Gloriam/In grateful remembrance of the men of this parish who gave their lives in the Great War/All these were honoured in their generations and were the Glory of their times./Ecclesiasticus XLIV-VII." 23 men of Bangor-Is-Y-Coed are remembered. The village also known as Bangor-on-Dee.
The Parish Church of All Hallows War Memorial.	Allerton Merseyside	A stone table with pediment is positioned under the north transept and remembers the 27 men of the parish who gave their lives in the 1914–1919 war. It was designed by Tyson Smith.
22nd Cheshire Regiment Memorial	Chester Cheshire	In Chester Cathedral's Garden of Remembrance is a memorial to the 22nd Cheshire Regiment. The gates at the entrance to the garden carry an inscription in gold lettering and there are regimental crests carved on each face of the plinth and also on the stone gate posts, all the work of Tyson Smith. The inscription reads "Mors Ianva Vitae/In grateful remembrance/of the Officers and Men of/the 22nd Cheshire Regiment/Who laid down their lives in/The service of the Country/1939-1945"
The Cheshire Yeomanry Tablet WW2	Chester Cheshire	In Chester Cathedral itself there is a tablet which marks the service of The Cheshire Yeomanry in the Second World War. There are three stone tablets, and the central one is inscribed "In proud memory of the Officers/Non-Commissioned Officers and Men of/The Cheshire (Earl of Chester's) Yeomanry/who gave their lives for their Country/in the Great War 1939–1945" The left and righthand tablets have the names of those who died listed on them. 52 names are listed.
Memorial to Wion de Malpas Egerton.	Chester Cheshire	Also in Chester Cathedral, and on the west wall of the south transept, we have a white marble memorial plaque which reads "In proud memory of/Wion de Malpas Egerton/DSO RN (Retired)/who gave his life for his Country/in the Battle of the Atlantic while/serving as Commodore of Convoys/Born 16 April 1879 Died 1st January 1943" The rectangular white marble tablet has the above inscription in black lettering and also has the Royal Navy crest and the Egerton family crest (a Red Lion Rampant) to the left of the text. The wording in the third line is flanked by the flags of the Royal Navy.
Liverpool Cenotaph	Liverpool Merseyside	This Cenotaph stands in front of St George's Hall on Lime Street, and Tyson Smith's reliefs arguably make this memorial one of the finest of the many such memorials in England. It was unveiled on 11 November 1930 and features on one side a relief representing those who mourn for the dead, and on the other side the servicemen marching off to fight. The inscription on the east face, which represents Liverpool on Armistice Day, reads "To the men of Liverpool who fell in the Great War, and the victory that day was turned into mourning unto all the people". In Tyson Smith’s relief the survivors, consumed with grief, file towards a central coffin and if we look carefully we see in the background to these figures, row upon row of gravestones; a depiction of a Great War cemetery. On the west face the relief depicts "The March to Action of the Fighting Services" and we see a representation of the relentless march to war of grim-faced servicemen, so many of whom were lost in the First World War. The words read "As unknown and yet well known; As dying, and behold we live/Out of the North Parts....A Great Company and a Mighty Army". The memorial was designed by Professor Lionel B.Budden and Morris Singer & Co were responsible for the bronze casting.
The Parish Church of Arrochar- Memorial to Captain MacGunn.	Arrochar Strathclyde	Again Budden and Tyson Smith worked together to create a simple memorial which comprises the badge of The Cameron Highlanders and the inscription "In memory of/Francis John MacGunn/BA BLitt Oxon/Lecturer in History/ in the University of/Glasgow Captain 6th/Battn The Queen's Own/Cameron Highlanders/who fell in the Battle/of Loos September the/26th 1915 Aged 27 Years/I will lift up mine eyes/Unto the hills"
Birkenhead War Memorial	Birkenhead. Merseyside	This War Memorial is dedicated to the "Men of Birkenhead". The memorial stands in Hamilton Square and was unveiled on 5 July 1925. The memorial comprises a cenotaph with a moulded base, with frieze and name panels on the longer sides and reliefs at the short ends, all surmounted by a sarcophagus. Reliefs depict mourning female figures with a "Next of Kin Plaque" and laurel wreaths and a palm branch. Below the name panels another relief has depictions of the emblems of the Army, Navy and the Merchant Navy. The civic arms of Birkenhead are embossed upon oval escutcheons. A staggering 1,455 names are listed for the First World War.
Fleetwood War Memorial	Fleetwood. Lancashire	The Fleetwood War Memorial stands in Fleetwood's Memorial Park. On the top of a plinth stands a Romanesque figure with his right arm upraised and supporting a pole with the eternal flame at the top. In his left hand he holds a coiled snake and he has a laurel garland on his head. A photograph of the memorial from November 2008 is shown below. The plinth stands on a square base surmounted by an octagonal base. There are inscriptions on the sides of the plinth and on the base, and at the base four flower planters have the names added of men who fell in the 1939–1945 war. Around the top of the plinth is inscribed "FOR FREEDOM LOVING BRITONS, THE BELOVED ONES DIED FOR US" On one of the faces of the plinth is inscribed "TO THE MEMORY/OF THE MEN OF/FLEETWOOD WHO/GAVE THEIR LIVES/FOR THEIR COUNTRY/1914-1918/AND IN GRATEFUL/REMEMBRANCE OF/THOSE WHO SHARED/ITS DANGER" Around the base of the plinth the inscription reads "TO YOU FROM FAILING HANDS WE THROW THE TORCH, BE YOURS TO HOLD IT HIGH. MAN MUST STILL STRIVE, PRINCIPLES DO NOT APPLY THEMSELVES" On the lower base is written "1939–1945 TO THE MEMORY OF THOSE WHO CONTINUED THE FIGHT FOR FREEDOM AND CHRISTIAN WAY OF LIFE/(NAMES)" In the gallery below are more photographs from November 2008. 330 men of Fleetwood died in the First World War and 190 in the Second World War.
West Lancashire Golf Club Memorial	Blundellsands. Merseyside	A slate tablet in the West Lancashire Golf Club at Blundellsands on Merseyside was erected on 18 October 1964 and remembers the members of the club who died in the two World Wars.
St Mary and St Helen's Church War Memorial.	Neston. Cheshire	In St Mary and St Helens Church in Neston in Cheshire is another example of Tyson Smith’s prowess as a letter cutter, this time on a window in the church which remembers the men from the parish who died in the 1914–1918 war.
Royal Academy of Arts	London	Tyson Smith executed a tablet at one end of the entrance porch to the Royal Academy of Arts which remembers the members and students of that Academy who fell in the First World War. The stone tablet has the initials "RA" surrounded by a wreath of laurel and oak leaves. This tablet was unveiled on 12 May 1922. A photograph of this tablet taken in August 2008 is shown below.
St Matthew and St James' Church	Mossley Hill Merseyside	Another tablet carved by Tyson Smith can be seen in St Matthew and St James' Church at Mossley Hill on Merseyside. This remembers Lieutenant George Lawrence Harford who was killed at Ypres on 17 February 1915.
Holy Trinity Church War Memorial	Wavertree. Merseyside	This church has a stone cross with flanking draped female figures on a pedestal. The cross remembers the men of Wavertree who died in the First and Second World War.
Durham Cathedral War Memorial Cross.	Durham. County Durham	In Durham Cathedral is another stone cross, the cross of St Cuthbert, with ornate carvings on the sides of the shaft by Tyson Smith. It stands outside the Cathedral's East Front. Representations of various artefacts such as helmets and water bottles are carved onto the sides of the column. It was unveiled by the Marquis of Londonderry on 24 November 1928.
Liverpool Medical Institute War Memorial.	Mount Pleasant Merseyside	There is a bronze plaque by Tyson Smith in the main entrance hall of the Liverpool Medical Institute on Mount Pleasant in Liverpool. One of the names on the plaque is that of Captain Noel Chavasse, VC and Bar, MC. The inscription reads "1914 In Arduis Fidelis 1919/ In honoured memory of/Members of the Liverpool/Medical Institution who gave/Their lives for their Country/(Names)/The gift of W.Thelwall Thomas/President 1918–1919 On either side of the plaque is a relief depiction of the badge of the Medical Institute over an upended torch.
Merchant Taylor's School War Memorial	Crosby. Merseyside	Professor Lionel B Budden designed this memorial and Tyson Smith carried out the sculptural work. It consists of a Westmoreland slate tablet and a brass plaque. The inscription reads "In Memory of/Those old boys of Merchant Taylors' School, Crosby/who gave their lives in the Great War 1914–1919 (Names)" The memorial is located in the school library and was unveiled on 2 October 1923. 155 names are listed.
St Barnabas Church War Memorial	Mossley Hill. Merseyside	Slate tablets executed by Tyson Smith in St Barnabas Church, Mossley Hill on Merseyside remember the 43 men of the parish killed in the First World War.
Hightown War Memorial	Hightown. Merseyside	The War Memorial at Hightown on Merseyside has a kneeling winged angel holding a wreath with some additional carvings on the memorial's cross.
Southport War Memorial	Southport. Merseyside	The War Memorial at Southport stands in a memorial garden on Lord Street, at the junction with London Street. This most elaborate work was unveiled on 18 November 1923 by the 17th Earl of Derby. The memorial is on a grand scale, with a central obelisk and colonnades on either side. The obelisk is made of Portland Stone and is 21000mm (68.8 feet) high. On the side of each colonnade is a grassed area with pond. On the west face of the northern colonnade is a relief panel featuring Britannia seated with a trailing sword in her right hand and a small winged victory figure in her left hand, and on the west face of the southern colonnade there is a relief panel showing Britannia in mourning laying a wreath over a Greek helmet with a standard behind her inscribed "Patria". Photographs of these two reliefs are shown in the gallery below. Also shown in the gallery are the crossed wreaths and torches featured above the inscription on the east face of the northern and southern colonnades. The wording on the south face of the northern colonnade reads: "TELL BRITAIN YE WHO MARK THIS MONUMENT" That on the north face of the southern colonnade reads "FAITHFUL TO HER WE FELL AND REST CONTENT" (Note: Inspired by an epitaph, written by Edmund Garrett who was inspired by the famous epitaph of Simonides at Thermopylae.) On the south face of the southern colonnade is carved "TO FAMOUS MEN ALL EARTH IS SEPULCHRE". On the north face of the northern colonnade is carved "THEIR PORTION IS WITH THE ETERNAL" In the four chapels various battles are marked. That on the north west carries the inscription "THEIR NAME LIVETH" and lists Messines Ridge, Paschendaele, Neuve Chapelle, Loos, Festubert and Ypres. The chapel on the north east carries the inscription "ALL THAT THEY HAD THEY GAVE" and lists Aisne, Somme, Marne, Foret de Morvel, Mons, and Arras. The chapel on the south east states "FOR THE SACRED CAUSE OF JUSTICE" and lists Cambrai, Le Cateau, R.Selle/Hindenbug Line, Salonika and Vimy Ridge and finally, the chapel on the south west declares "ON THE DECK OF FAME THEY DIED" and lists Falkland (sic), Palestine, Zeebrugge, Jutland, Mesopotamia and Gallipoli. On the east face of the southern colonnade an inscription reads "THEY DIED/THAT WE MIGHT LIVE/WE LIVE/ONLY AS WE/SAFEGUARD THE IDEAS FOR WHICH THEY DIED/FREEDOM JUSTICE MERCY/SO LET US LIVE/THAT WE MAY SHARE/WITH THEM THE LIFE/ETERNAL" On the east face of the northern colonnade an inscription reads "REMEMBER/THAT THE MEN/WHOSE NAMES/LIVE ON THESE WALLS/DIED/IN YOUTH OR PRIME/THAT FUTURE GENERATIONS/MIGHT INHERIT/A HAPPIER WORLD/AND A HUMAN SOCIETY/MORE RIGHTEOUS/AND MORE LOVING/THAN THESE BRAVE MEN/AND THEIR GENERATION KNEW" On the obelisk itself is carved "LOOK/UPWARD/STANDING/MUTE/SALUTE"
Widnes War Memorial	Widnes Cheshire	Widnes War Memorial comprises a tall square column on a colonnaded plinth and broad oblong base bearing name panels, surmounted by an urn and flame in stone. A carved cross and wreath are on the end face of the column. The arms of Widnes appear on the pedestal. 818 Widnes men died in the First World War and 256 in the Second World War.
Liverpool Post Office War Memorial		The Post Office War Memorial, another of Tyson Smith’s works, is a memorial to those men of the Liverpool Post Office who died in the First World War. It was originally unveiled in the main hall of the General Post Office in Victoria Street on 15 June 1924, but the memorial now stands in a new shopping precinct, the Met Quarter which was built on the old Post Office site. Tyson Smith carved a woman who symbolised Britain mourning her dead. The inscription reads "IN HONOUR/OF THOSE MEMBERS/OF THE LIVERPOOL/POST OFFICE STAFF/WHO FELL IN THE/GREAT WAR/1914-1918/They died for us:/they left this blessed fortune of the light/and gave themselves to darkness,/to our love returning never./But lo presiding over us/Like stars over the night/Quiet and lovely and supreme/ lives their death forever/Lascelles Abercrombie" Lascelles Abercrombie was a poet, and is the author of the verses quoted. 156 Post Office workers gave their lives in the Great War.
The Merchant Navy War Memorial	Liverpool	This memorial is situated at the Pier Head and was designed by Tyson Smith and built by Stanley Harold Smith and Charles Frederick Blythin. It was unveiled on 12 November 1952 by Admiral Cunningham. It bears the inscription "These officers and men of the Merchant Navy died while serving with the Royal Navy and have no grave but the sea 1939–1945" The names of the fallen are inscribed on 25 bronze plaques on a semi-circular Portland Stone base.

=== Other work ===
Work	Location	Notes and References
Stanley Hall	Liverpool	For the outside of this building in Edmond Street, Liverpool, Tyson Smith carved a plaque of a young man feeding a calf.
St Monica's Church	Bootle Merseyside	For the outside wall of this church, Tyson Smith carved "The Three Angels".
Former Lloyds Bank Building	Liverpool	For the former Lloyds Bank building in Williamson Street, Liverpool, Tyson Smith created a roundel showing a lady carrying coins in her scarf.
Norris Green Library	Liverpool	On the outside of this library are some plaques carved by Tyson Smith.
The Hod Carrier and the Architect	Liverpool	These works are now on display in the Museum of Liverpool.
Spinney House. Church Street	Liverpool	Tyson Smith carved dolphins, starfish, seahorses, octopuses, lobsters, scallop shells, mermen, tridents and compasses on the outside of Spinney House. This building was originally built for the store Littlewood. It was it seems the last major building in Liverpool to incorporate decorative sculpture.
Bluecoat Chambers	Liverpool	Bluecoat Chambers was originally built as a charity school in 1717 and is the oldest surviving building in central Liverpool. The Bluecoat School remained in this building until 1906 when it was relocated to Wavertree. In 1909 the building was purchased by the first Lord Leverhulme with the intention of using it as a centre for the Arts. This project never matured in Lord Leverhulme’s lifetime and in 1925 the building was purchased by the Bluecoat Society of Arts. However the building was badly damaged by German bombs in 1941 and required repair and restoration. There is a memorial stone to this repair work in the wall of the northern wing as you enter the gates (on the right hand side). Herbert Tyson Smith had a yard at the rear of the building and the memorial was his work. The plaque, in Latin, shows Tyson Smith’s letter-cutting skills and translates as "Struck down from the sky by the firebrands of the enemy and partly destroyed on 4th May 1941 restored with dutiful affection in the year 1951". All the original main windows had keystone cherub's heads and six of them were replaced by Tyson Smith, as was the pediment over the main door. On either side of the plaque, there are reliefs of a schoolboy and schoolgirl, also carved by Tyson Smith.
Crown Public House	Liverpool	For the exterior of this public house on Stopgate Lane and the East Lancashire Road, Tyson Smith carved a dolphin and a woman pouring a drink.
The Head of Athena	Liverpool	Tyson Smith created this sculpture on the Athenaeum Club building in Church Alley. Liverpool.
Barclays Bank Water Street	Liverpool	Tyson Smith was responsible for the bronze panels on the Barclays Bank building in Water Street, Liverpool.
Bronze bust of George V	Birkenhead Merseyside	Tyson Smith created the bronze bust of George V in Birkenhead Library
Bronze busts of George V and Queen Mary	Birkenhead Merseyside	These busts at the Kingsway tunnel Birkenhead entrances are by Tyson Smith.
Memorial Plaque for William Garmon-Jones	Liverpool	For the Cohen Library, Liverpool University. Tyson Smith carried out the lettering on a memorial plaque for William Garmon-Jones. This includes a profile of Garmon-Jones. This is a fine example of Tyson Smith's skills as a letter cutter. Garmon-Jones had been in charge of the library for several years.
The John Sampson Memorial Plaque	Liverpool	Also for the Cohen Library, Tyson Smith carried out the letter cutting on a memorial plaque to another Cohen Library librarian.
Liverpool Architectural Society Medal		Tyson Smith designed a medal for the Liverpool Architectural Society.
English Martyrs' Church	Wallasey, Merseyside	Tyson Smith designed the font, and a statue in the Lady Chapel of the Virgin Mary with St John Fisher.

== Gallery of images ==
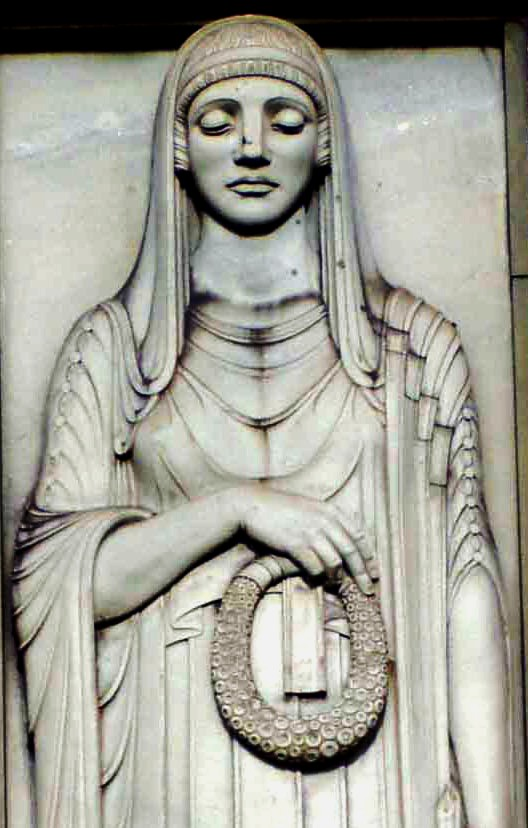
Sculpture on Birkenhead War Memorial. Image courtesy Liz Taylor of Hixon, Staffordshire.

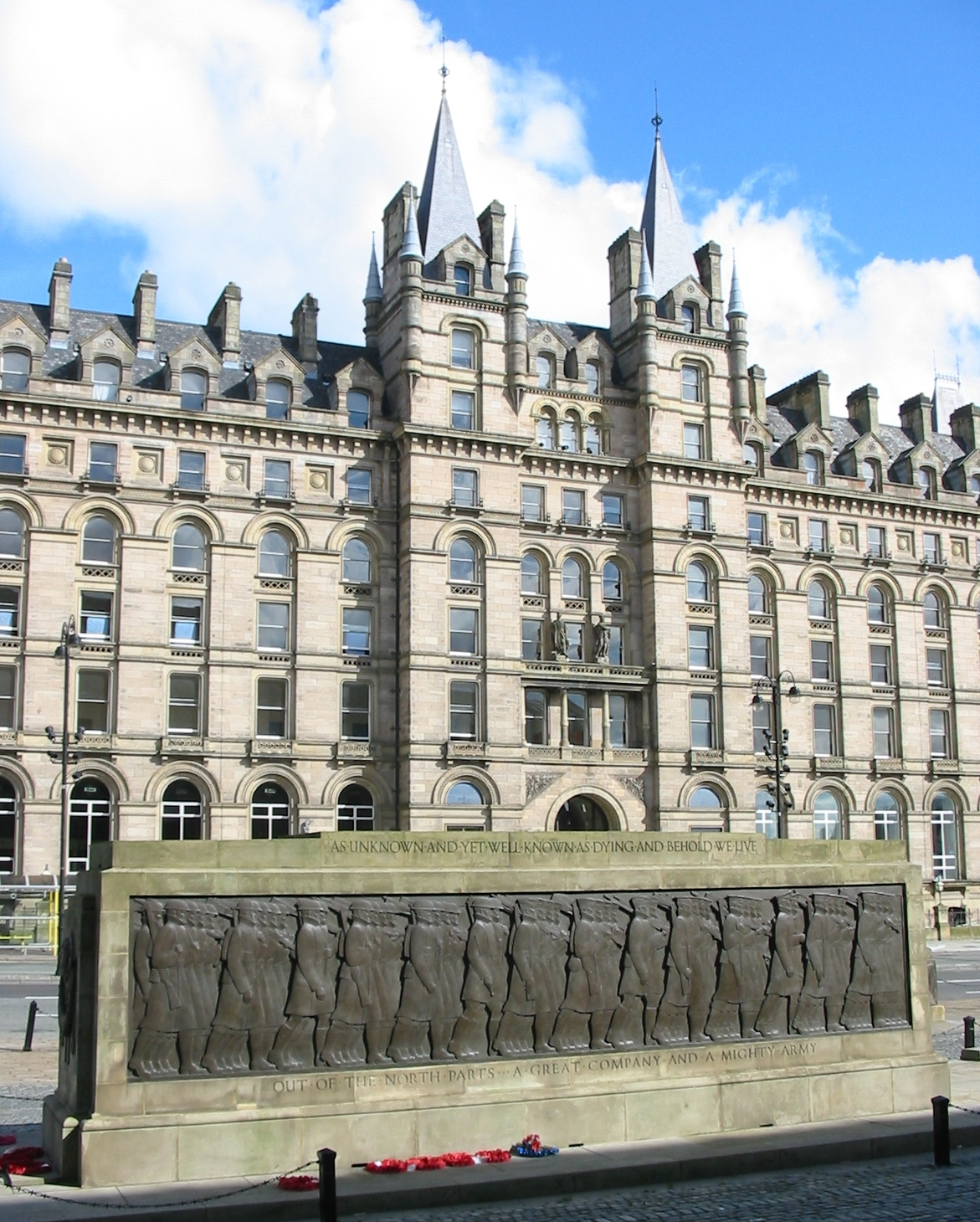
North Western Hotel Liverpool with the Cenotaph in front.

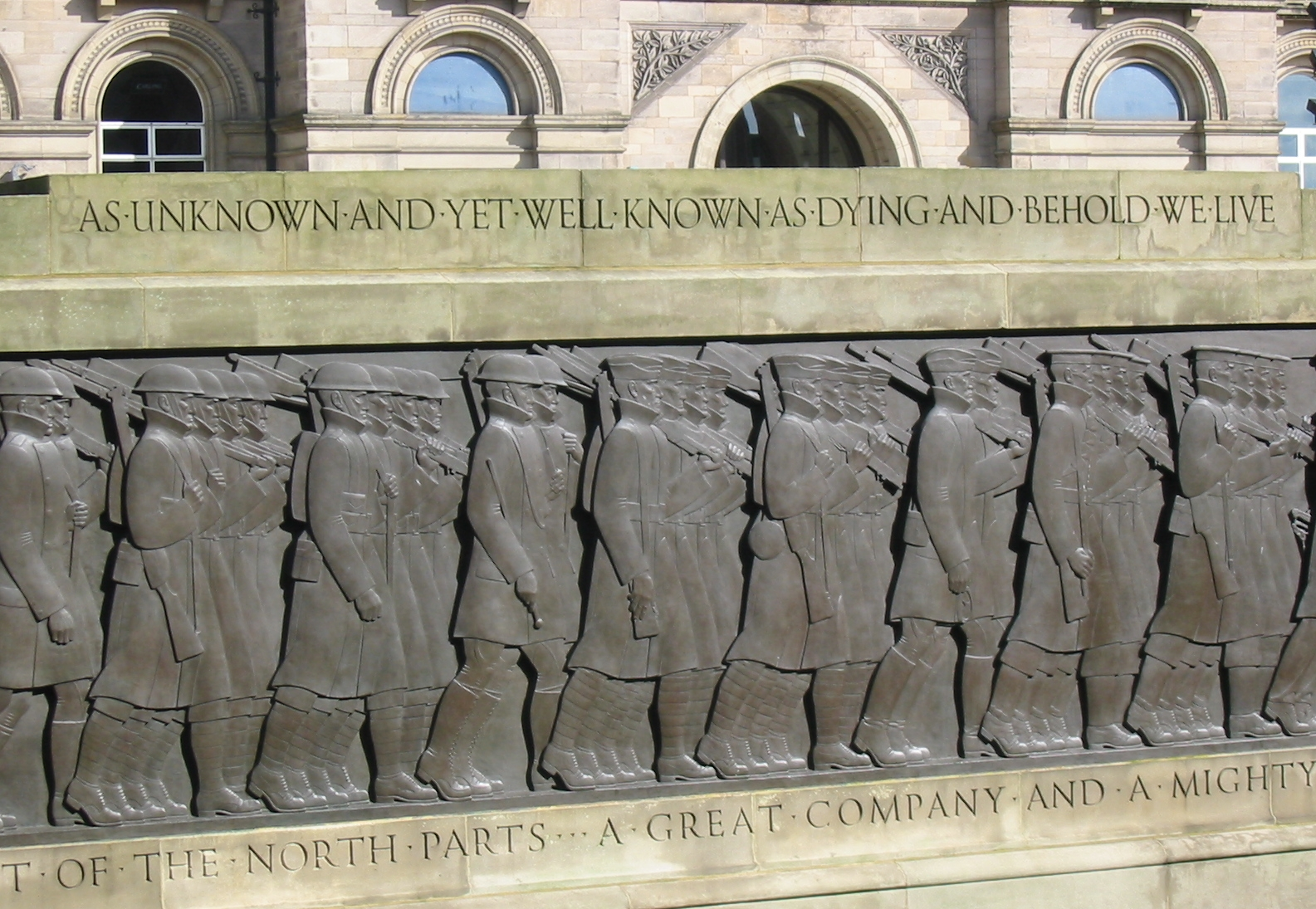
Cenotaph Liverpool, Herbert Tyson Smith. Marching column

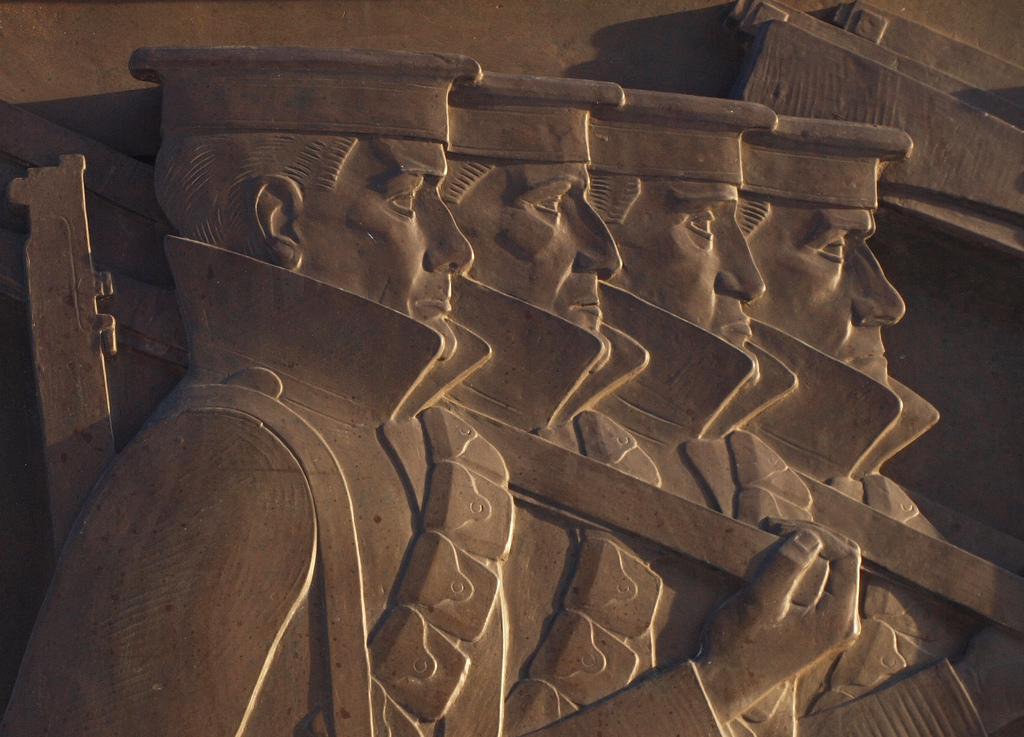
Cenotaph Liverpool, Herbert Tyson Smith. Sailors marching forward.

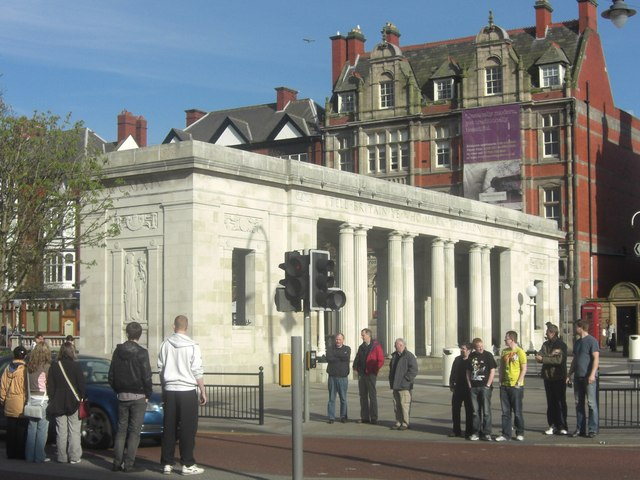
Southport War Memorial – The Colonnade

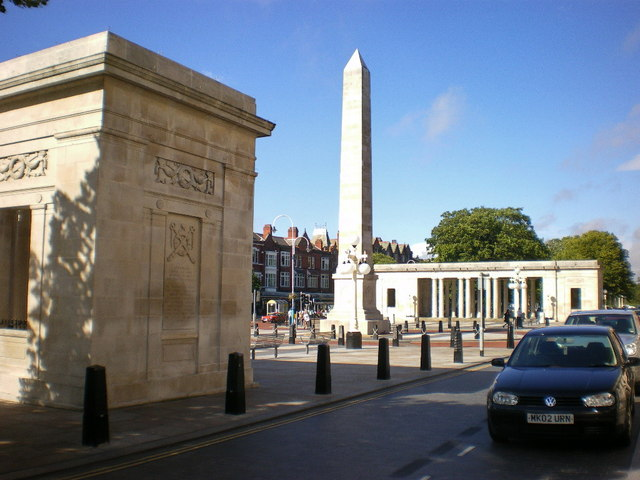
Southport War Memorial

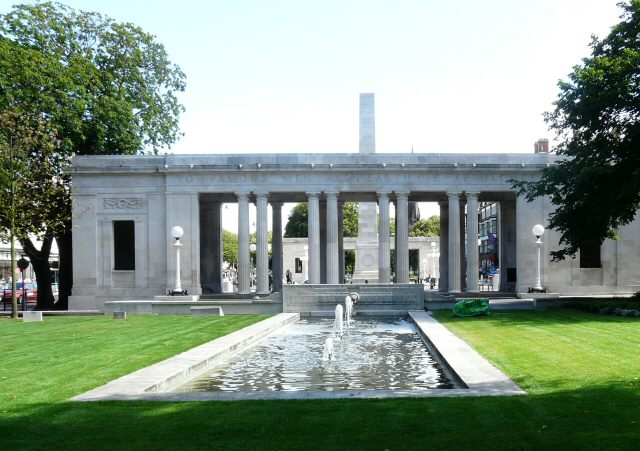
Southport War Memorial – Fountains

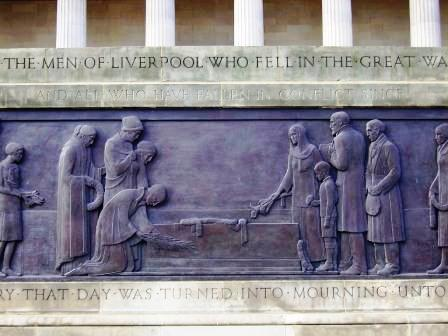
Part of relief on Liverpool Cenotaph. Mourners gather round a coffin.

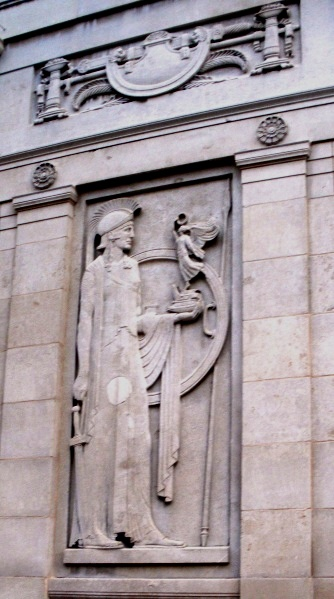
Relief on Southport War Memorial.

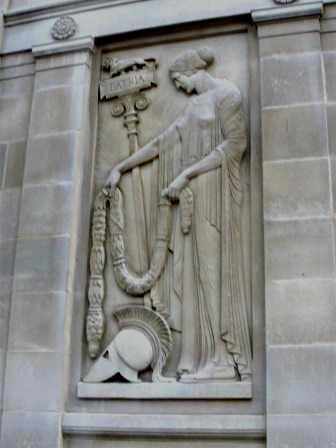
Relief on Southport War Memorial.

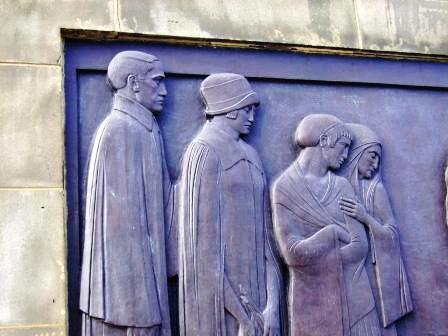
Part of relief on Liverpool Cenotaph. Some of the mourners.

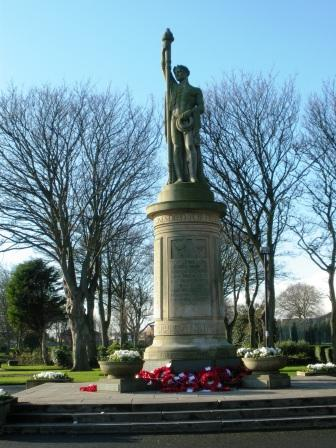
Fleetwood War Memorial.

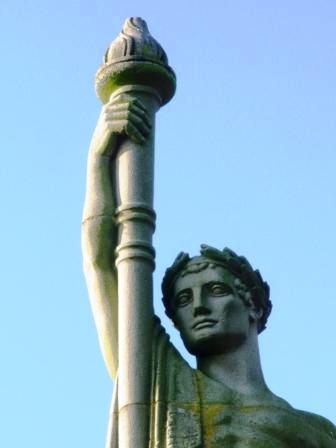
Tyson Smith work on Fleetwood War Memorial.

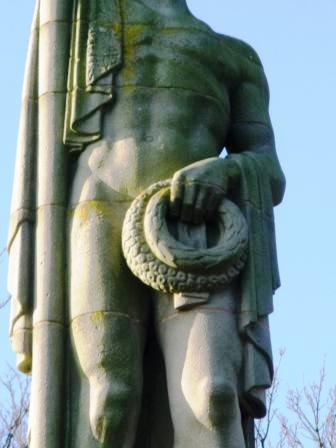
Tyson Smith work on Fleetwood War Memorial.

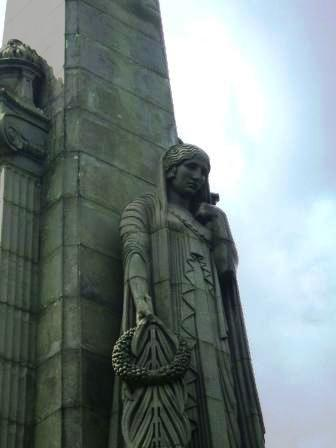
Main sculpture on Accrington War Memorial

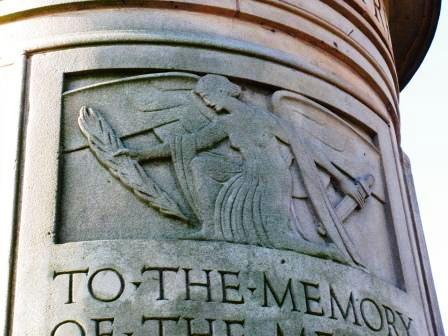
Sculptural work by Tyson Smith on Fleetwood War Memorial

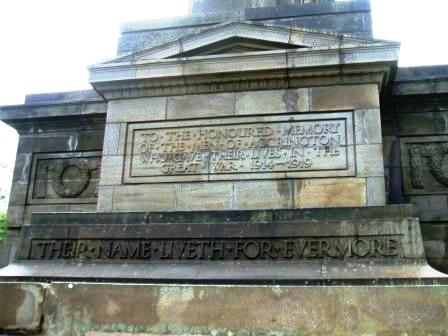
Part Accrington War Memorial

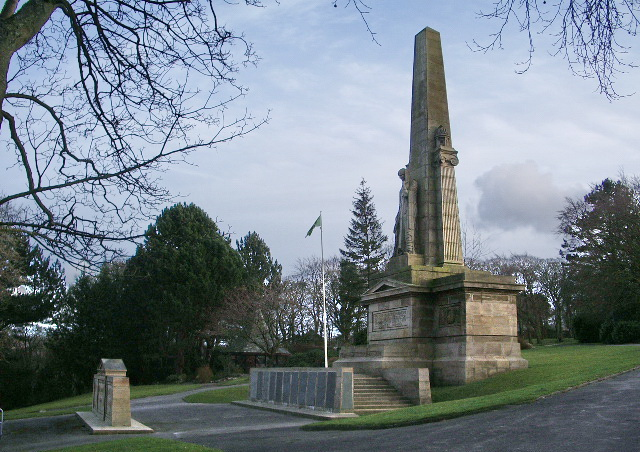
Accrington War Memorial. Image by Alexander P.Kapp.

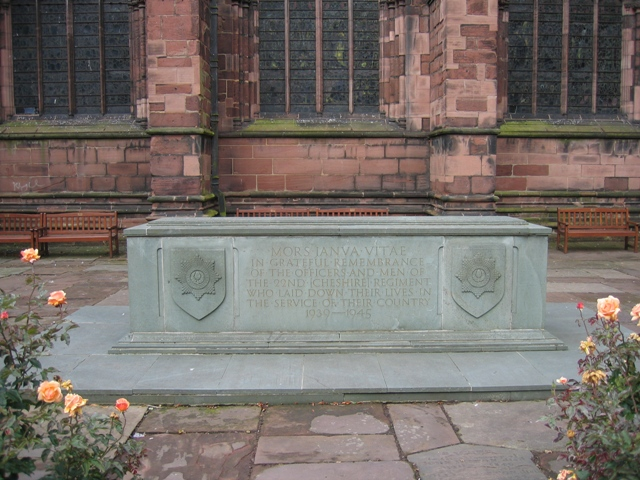
Cheshire Regiment Memorial.Image by John S Turner.

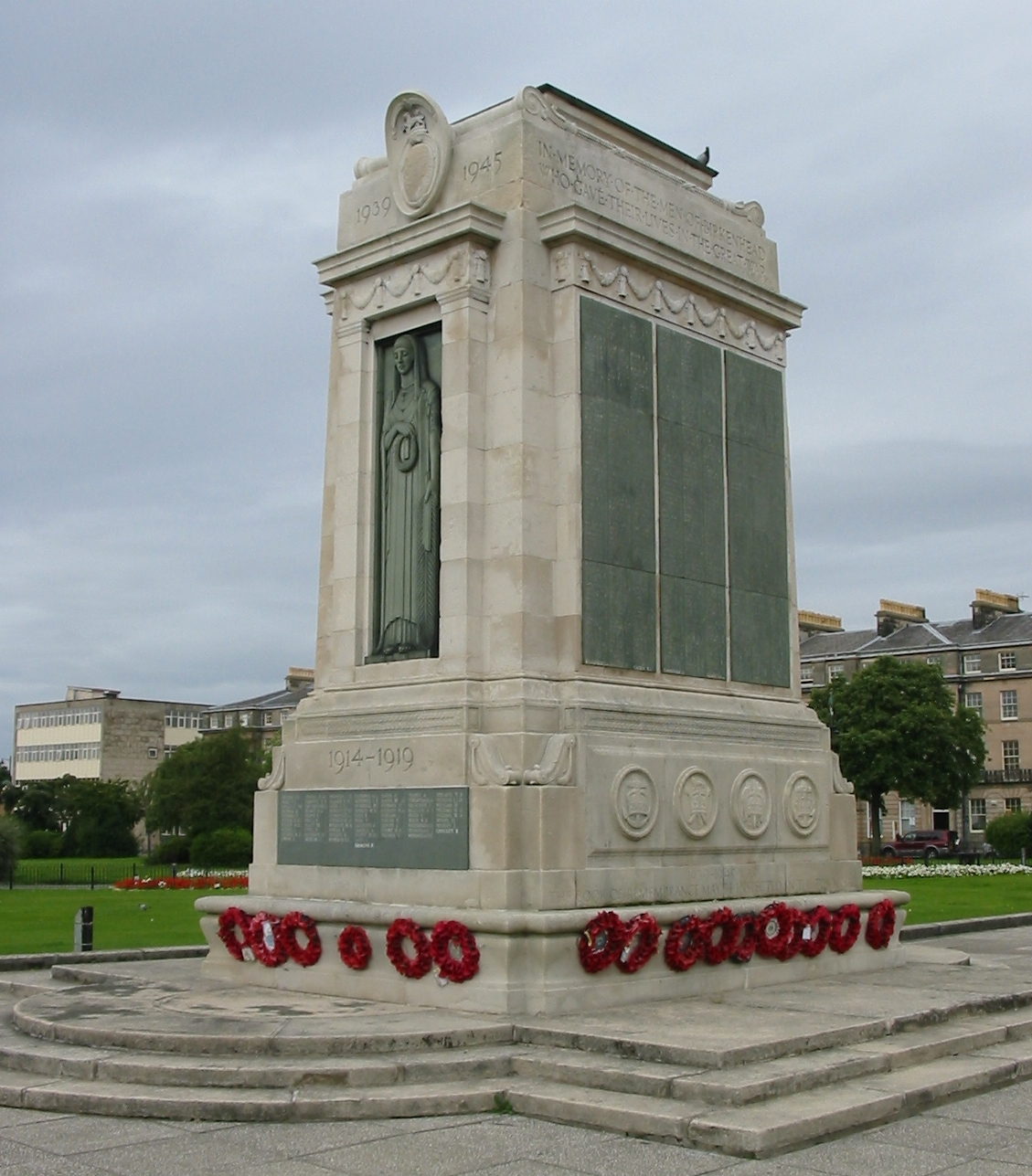
Birkenhead War Memorial. Image by Man vyi.

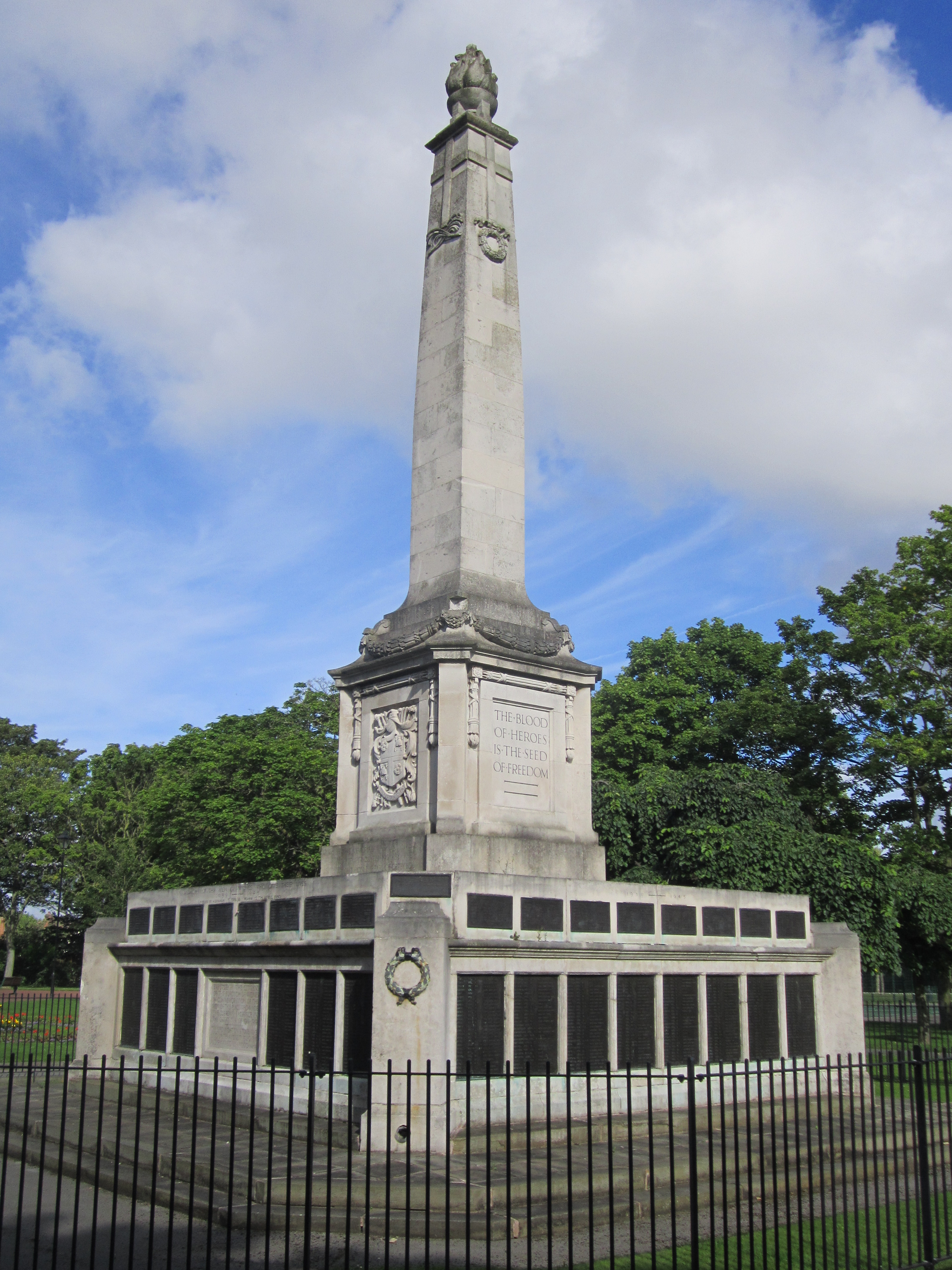
Widnes War Memorial. Image by Rept0n1x

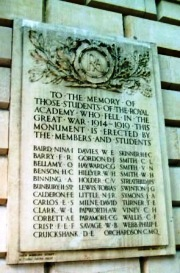
Plaque outside Royal Academy

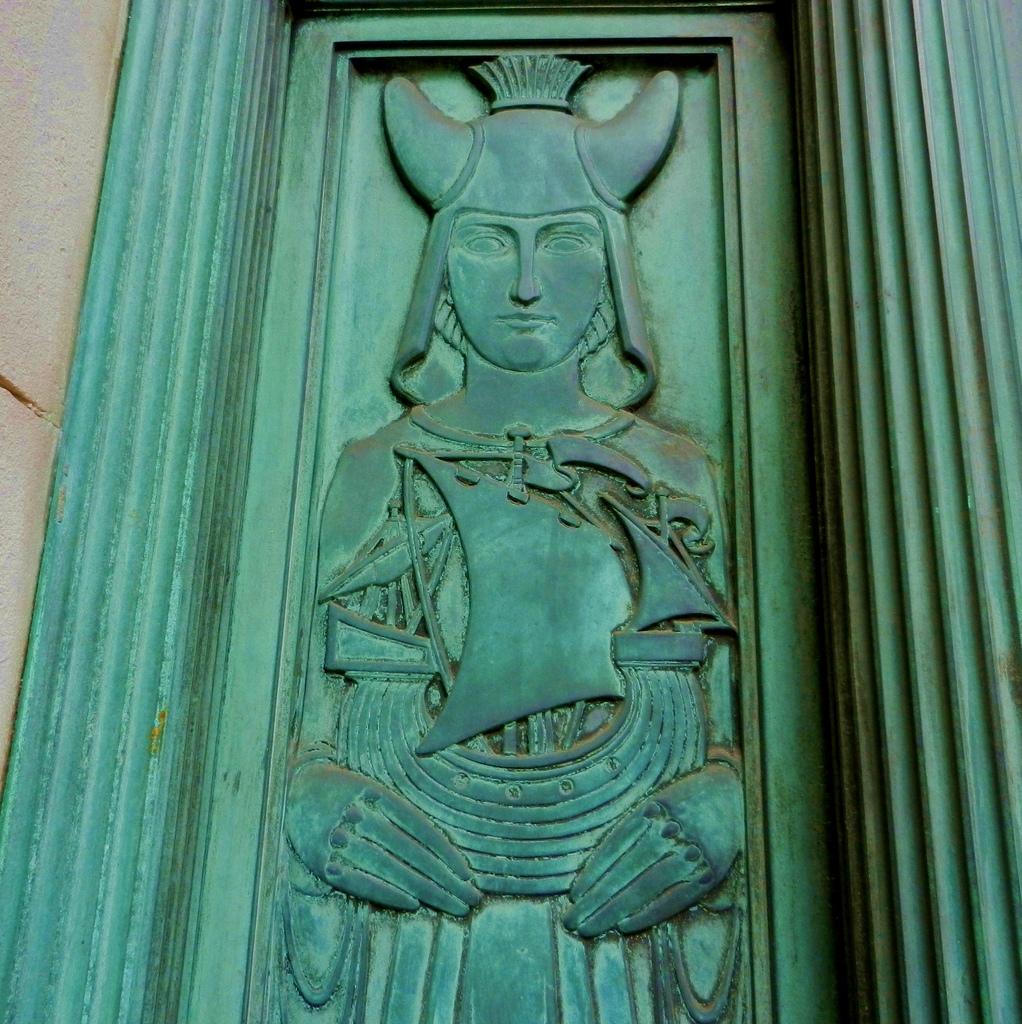
Detail from a decorative metal panel Martins Building. Image shown courtesy Reg Towner RIBA.

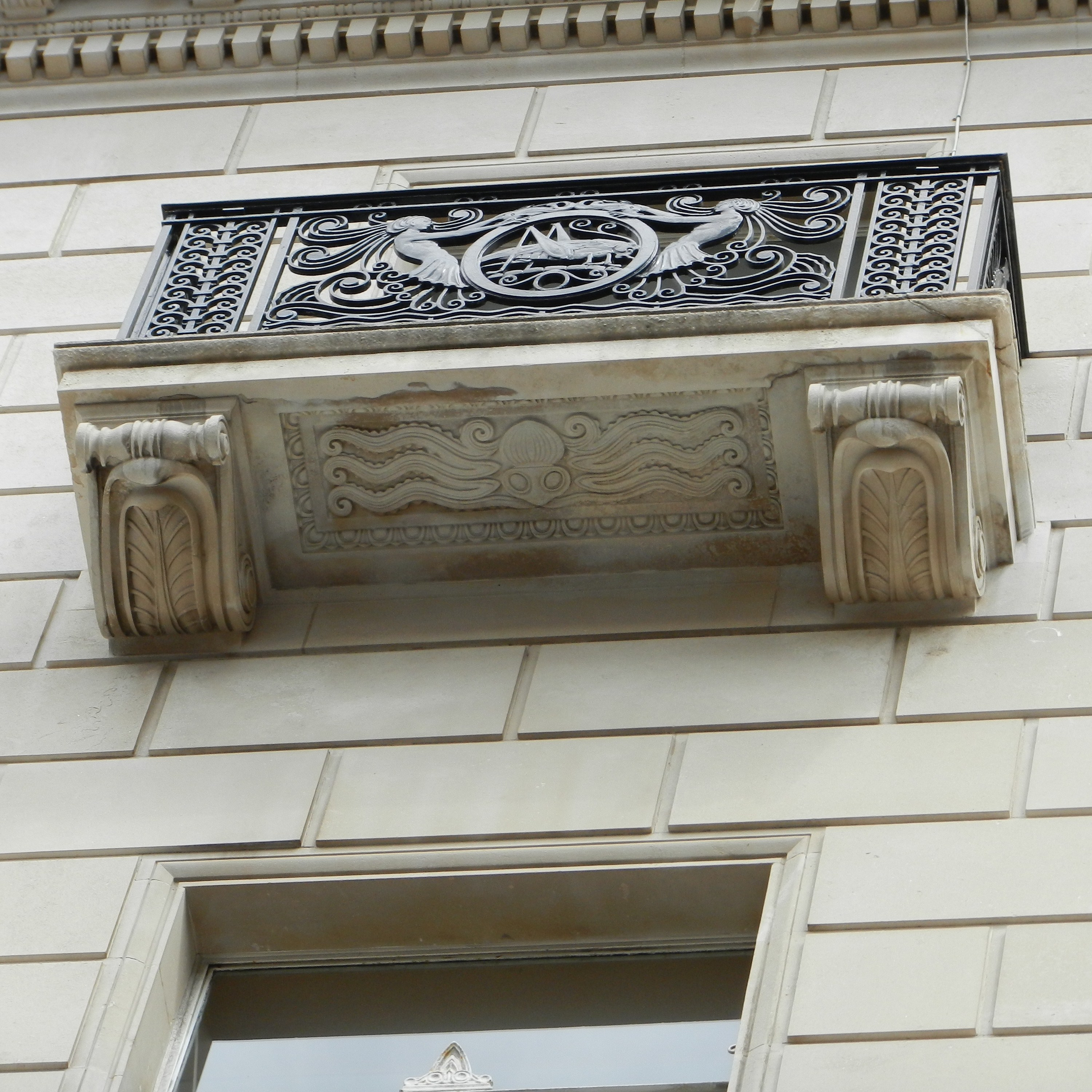
Carving of Octopus. Martins Building. Image shown courtesy Reg Towner RIBA.

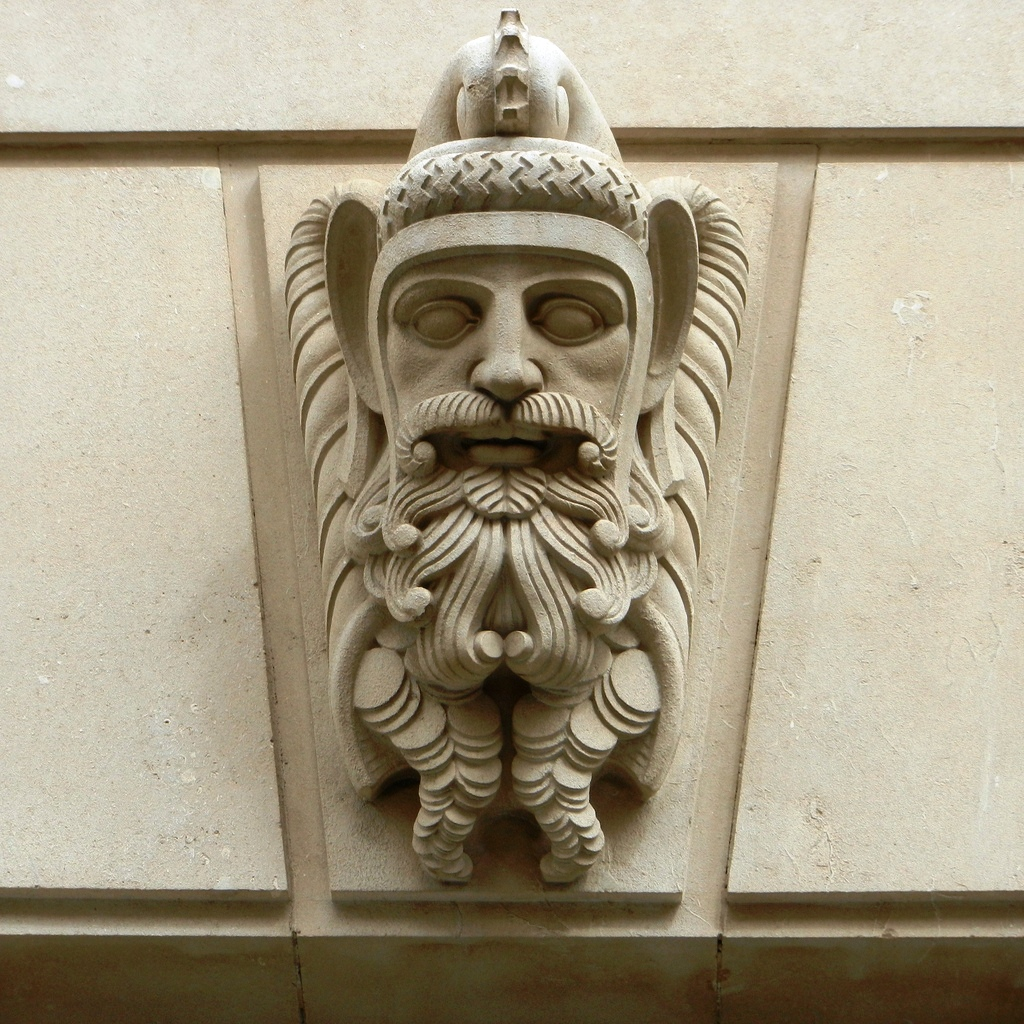
Neptune. Carving on Martins Building. Image shown courtesy Reg Towner RIBA.

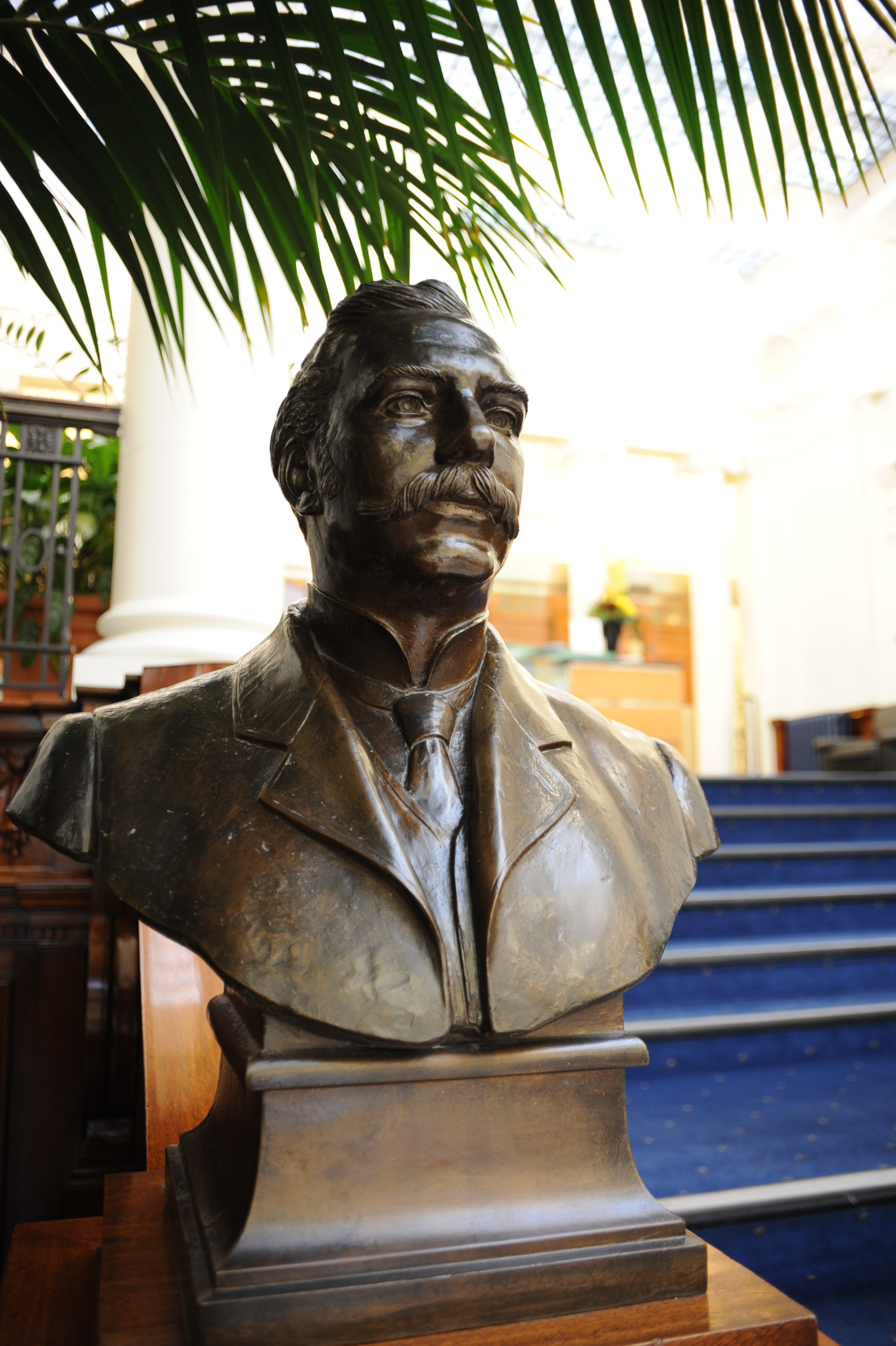
Bust of James Darcy Lever in Lady Lever Art Gallery/ Image shown courtesy Brian A Browne

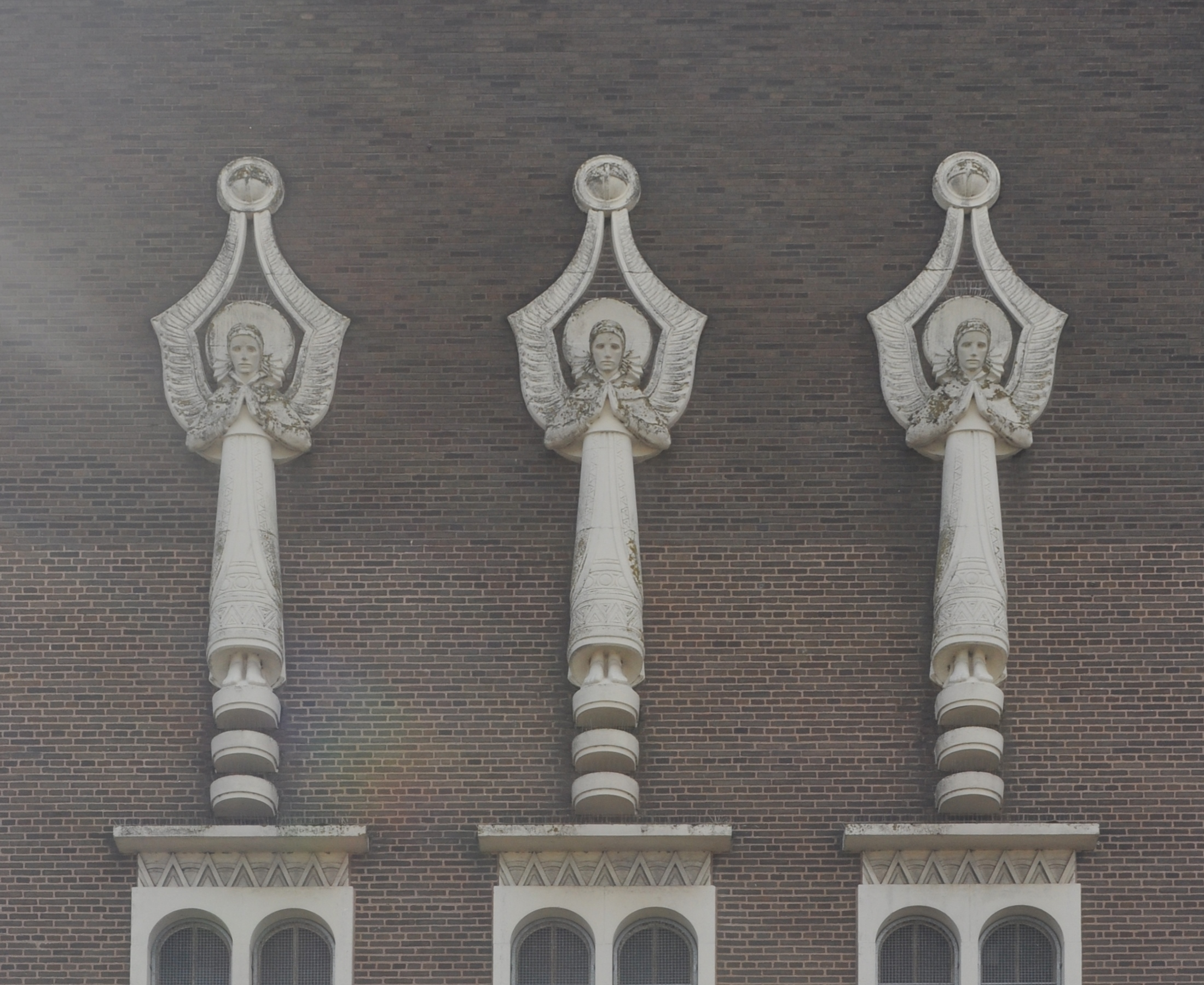
Angels at St Monica's Church, Bootle.

== Membership of Societies ==
- Associate member of Royal Society of British Sculptors from 6 December 1927 – 1945. Became a fellow in 1945.
- Fellow of Royal Society of British Sculptors. 8 March 1945 – 1972

== His grave ==
Tyson Smith is buried in Allerton Cemetery in Liverpool.
