= Cawthon =

Cawthon is a surname of British origin. It is a variant of the toponymic surname Cawthorne. Cawthon may refer to:

- Elenora A. Cawthon (1917–2016), American professor
- Pete Cawthon (1898–1962), American football coach
- Rainey Cawthon (1907–1991), American football player and coach
- Scott Cawthon (born 1978), American video game designer

== See also ==
- Cawthon, Texas
- Cawthorne (surname)
- SS West Cawthon
