= Cawthorne (surname) =

Cawthorne or Cawthorn is a toponymic surname related to the village of Cawthorne in South Yorkshire, England, or alternatively the village of Cawthorn in North Yorkshire, England. It also means a region of Yorkshire where there are many thorned plants and the climate is cold. The linguistic origin of the surname is the Old English (Anglo-Saxon) cald-thorne meaning "cold (or exposed) thorn-tree".

Other documented variants of this surname include Cawthon, Corthorn and Cawthron.

People named Cawthorne or Cawthorn include:

- Charles Cawthorne (1854–1925), music promoter, a founder of Cawthorne and Co.
- Harry Cawthorne (born 1900), English footballer
- James Cawthorn (1719–1761), minor English poet and schoolmaster
- James Cawthorn (1929–2008), British writer, scenarist and illustrator
- Joe T. Cawthorn (1911–1987), American politician
- Joseph Cawthorn (1867–1949), American stage and film actor
- Madison Cawthorn (born 1995), American politician
- Minnie Elizabeth Cawthorn (1898–1966), Australian headmistress and aviator
- Rachel Cawthorn (born 1988), British sprint canoer
- Rupert Cawthorne, early 20th-century English footballer
- Sam Cawthorn (born 1979), Australian author and entrepreneur
- W. A. Cawthorne (1825–1897), schoolmaster in South Australia, father of Charles
- Walter Cawthorn (1896–1970), Australian major general and diplomat

== See also ==
- John Fenton-Cawthorne (1753–1851), British Conservative Member of Parliament
