= Liverpool Cenotaph =

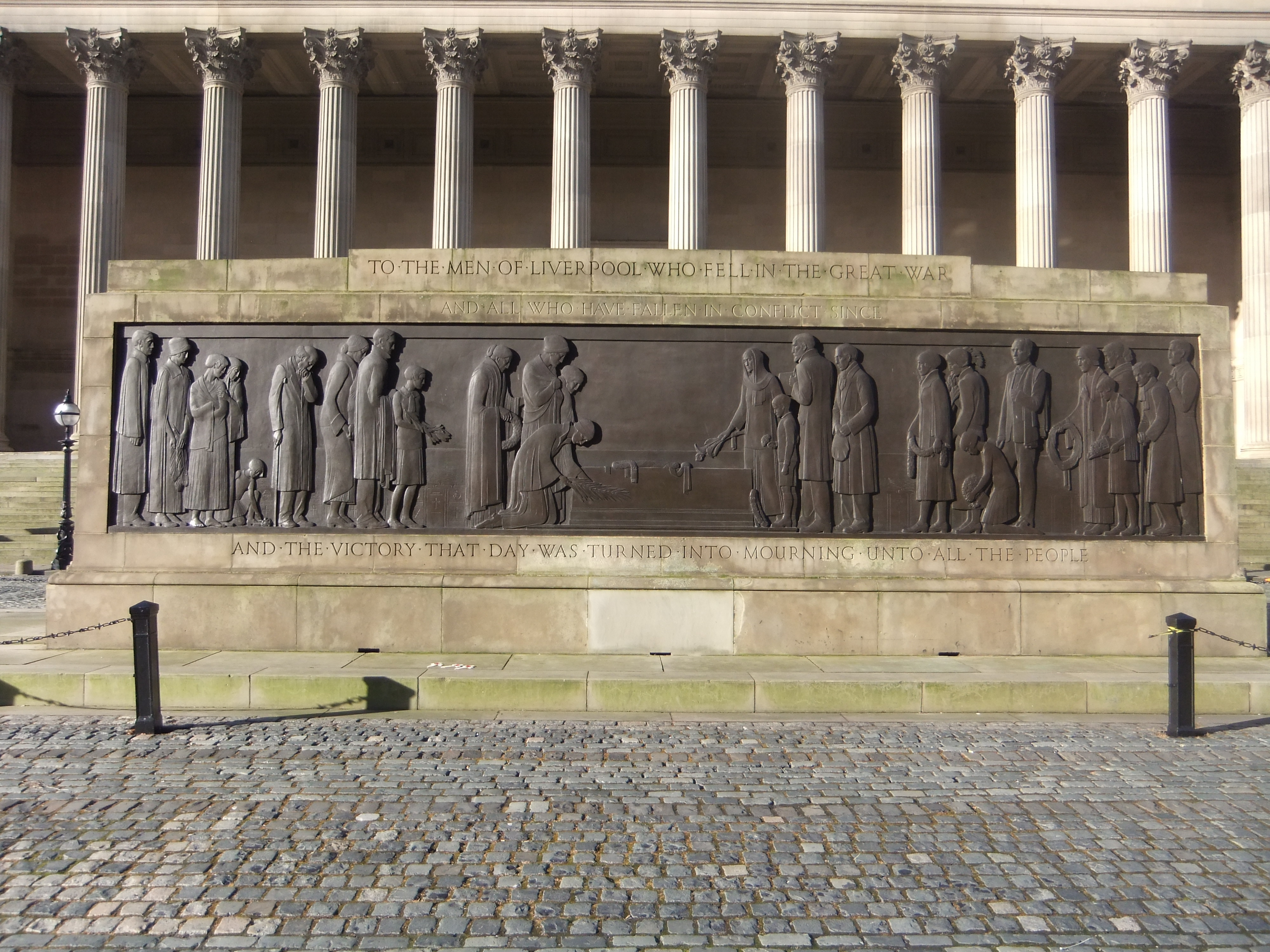
- Liverpool Cenotaph with the columns of St George's Hall behind
- Location: St George's Plateau, Liverpool, England
- Coordinates: 53.4085°N 2.9795°W
- Built: 1927–30
- Architect: Lionel Bailey Budden
- Sculptor: Herbert Tyson Smith

Listed Building – Grade I
- Official name: Liverpool Cenotaph
- Designated: 8 November 2013
- Reference no.: 1073463

Liverpool Cenotaph stands on St George's Plateau, to the east of St George's Hall in Liverpool, England. It was erected as a memorial to those who had fallen in the First World War. The dates of the Second World War were subsequently added. The cenotaph consists of a rectangular block of stone on a stone platform, with bronze, low-relief sculptures on the sides depicting marching troops and mourners. It was designed by Lionel Budden, with carving by Herbert Tyson Smith. Initially designated as a Grade II listed building, its status was raised to Grade I in 2013.

== History ==
In 1926, a competition was held to create a memorial using public funds, with Charles Reilly, professor of architecture at the University of Liverpool, as assessor. There were 257 entrants; the winning, anonymised entry was by Reilly's assistant, Lionel Budden. The building contractors appointed were A. E. Bradley and Company, the sculptor was Herbert Tyson Smith, and his bronze sculptures were made at the foundry of the Morris-Singer Company. The cenotaph was unveiled at 11 am on 11 November 1930 by the 17th Earl of Derby.

Following the end of the Second World War, the dates 1939 and 1945 were added. These were unveiled on Remembrance Sunday, 10 November 1946, by William G. Gregson, Lord Mayor of Liverpool.

== Description ==
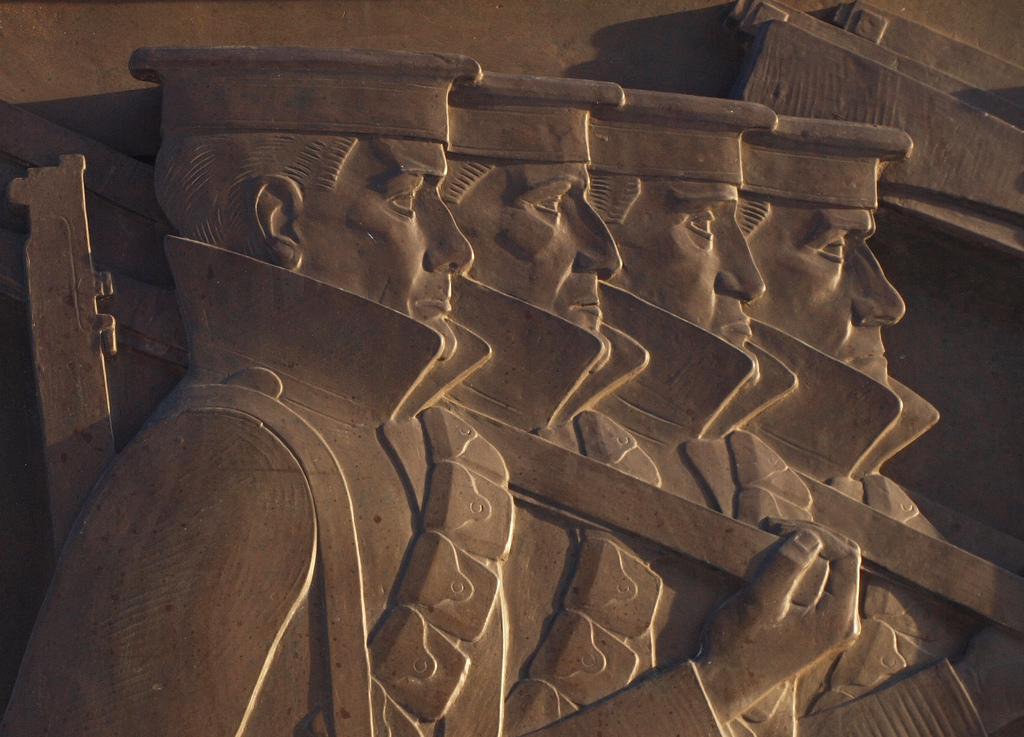
Detail from bronze sculpture depicting marching troops

The cenotaph consists of a rectangular block of Stancliffe stone, with bronze relief statues on the sides, standing on a platform of Yorkshire Silex stone. The rectangular block is 35 feet (10.7 m) long and 11 feet (3.4 m) high, the length of the bronze panels is 31 feet (9.4 m), and the platform is 61 feet (18.6 m) long and 15 feet (4.6 m) deep. It is orientated northeast–southwest, in parallel with St George's Hall. The bronze relief on the northwest face, opposite the hall, depicts a stream of marching troops in the uniforms of the various armed forces. Above the panel is an inscription reading AS UNKNOWN AND YET WELL KNOWN AS DYING AND BEHOLD WE LIVE, (Note: 2 Corinthians 6:9) and below, the inscription reads OUT OF THE NORTH PARTS A GREAT COMPANY AND A MIGHTY ARMY. (Note: Ezekiel 38:15) On the southeast face, facing Lime Street station, the panel depicts mourners laying flowers and wreaths on a Stone of Remembrance, with rows of graves in a military cemetery behind them. Above the panel the inscription reads TO THE MEN OF LIVERPOOL WHO FELL IN THE GREAT WAR with an added inscription below it reads AND ALL WHO HAVE FALLEN IN CONFLICT SINCE. Under the panel is an inscription reading AND THE VICTORY THAT DAY WAS TURNED INTO MOURNING UNTO ALL THE PEOPLE. (Note: 2 Samuel 19:2) On the shorter northeast and southwest faces are circular bronze shields with the coat of arms of Liverpool and festoons, and the dates of the two wars.

== Appraisal ==
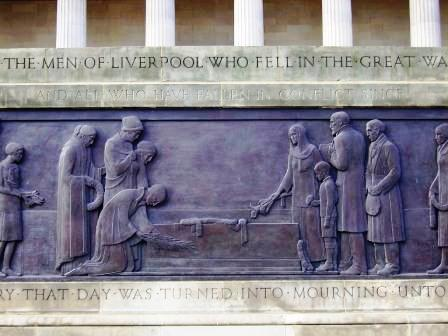
Detail from bronze sculpture depicting mourners laying wreaths on the Stone of Remembrance

The cenotaph was designated as a Grade II listed building on 28 June 1952. On 8 November 2013, the designation was raised to Grade I. (Note: Grade I status is given to buildings that "are of exceptional interest, sometimes considered to be internationally important", and Grade II status to buildings that "are nationally important and of special interest".) The reasons given for the designation include its design context with its "impressive location" adjacent to St George's Hall. Also noted is the architectural interest of the cenotaph, with its horizontal lines forming a foil to the vertical columns of the hall. Referring to its sculptural interest, the citation states that the "sculptural work is exceptional and is arguably Tyson Smith's finest and most powerful work". The design is considered to have contemporary significance in that rather than using "allegory and heroic idealisation", it employs "powerful and modern realist portrayals". The quality of its craftsmanship is praised, and it is also to have group value in its location near other listed buildings. In the Pevsner Architectural Guides, Sharples expresses the opinion that "it is one of the most remarkable war memorials in the country".

== See also ==
- Grade I listed buildings in Liverpool
- Grade I listed war memorials in England

== Notes and references ==
Notes

Citations
