= Matthew Flinders Girls Secondary College =

Coordinates: 38°09′00″S 144°21′12″E

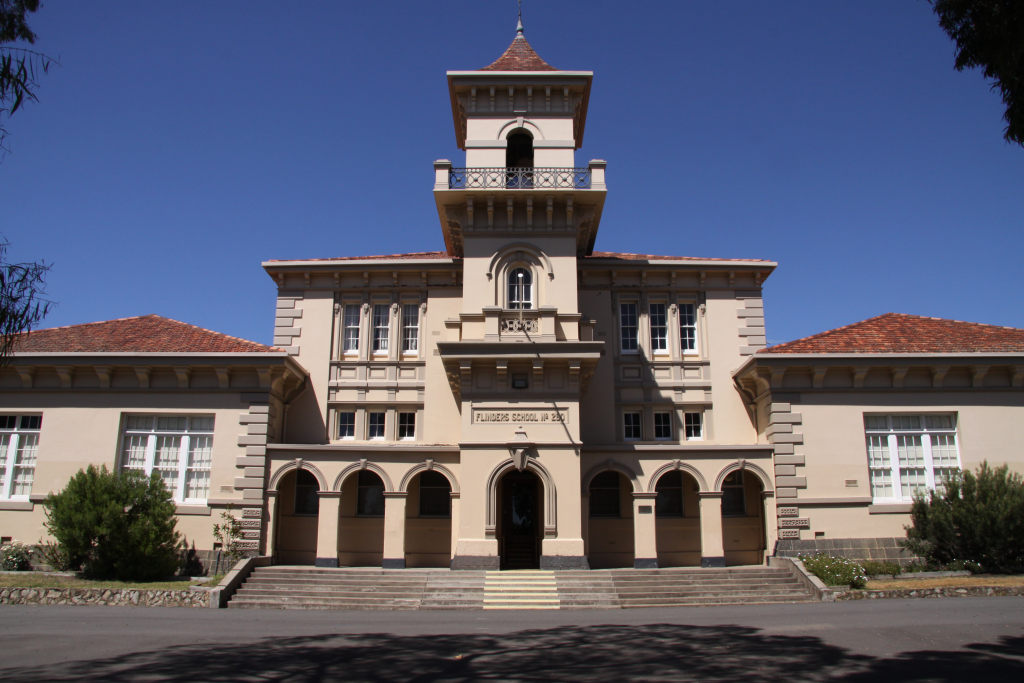

Location
- 2 Little Ryrie St; Geelong, Victoria; Australia

Information
- Type: Public secondary
- Motto: Looking Forward
- Established: 1856
- School district: Barwon South Western
- Principal: Michelle Winch
- Grades: 7–12
- Gender: All-female
- Enrollment: approximately 750
- Campus: Urban
- Colours: Blue, yellow, red
- Website: http://www.mfgsc.vic.edu.au/

Matthew Flinders Girls' Secondary College is an all-girls State secondary school located in Geelong, Victoria, Australia. It provides education for students from years 7–12.

== History ==
The school opened as Flinders National Grammar School in January 1858. The foundation stone was laid on 5 December 1856 by the administrator of the Colony of Victoria, Colonel Edward Macarthur. It is believed that the architect involved was the local German-born architect, Frank Kawerau, of Ryrie Street, Geelong, who also designed many government buildings across Victoria, including Willsmere (formerly Kew Lunatic Asylum (1864)), which has very similar architecture. The school was to be named the Geelong National Grammar School but, at the foundation ceremony, Macarthur asked permission to name it the "Flinders National Grammar School", after Captain Matthew Flinders, the first European explorer to circumnavigate Australia, who had climbed the local You Yangs range and described the Geelong area.

When the school opened in January 1858, 116 boys were enrolled, but there was no room for girls. Falling enrolments forced the school to become coeducational in 1864. The buildings were extended and remodelled in 1879, due to increased student numbers. When the extensions were opened in April 1880, it was officially named Flinders State School no. 260, but was unofficially known as "Link's School", after fifth headmaster, George Link, who was in charge from 1879 to 1894. During that time enrolments increased to 1000 students.

By 1938, enrolments were still increasing but there was not enough space. As a result, the decision was made in 1939 for the school to become "Matthew Flinders Girls School", under Ada Knowles. The school was led by Frances Higgins from 1942 to 1947. In 1948, Minnie Elizabeth Cawthorn was appointed as the new head. Historian Diane Langmore has written that, at that time, the school was "dilapidated", and "a dumping ground" for girls who would work in the mills as soon as they were fourteen. Cawthorn decided that the students should not be trained as housewives but to have a life. The school was renamed "Matthew Flinders Girls School", building extensions were made and the grounds became pristine. In 1950, Matthew Flinders students were the first in the state to sit the "Girls' Leaving Certificate". In 1956, Mary Lausza became the new head of the school.

In 1966, under Dr J. S. Bowden, the school gained high school status and it was renamed "Matthew Flinders Girls High School". It is now called Matthew Flinders Girls Secondary College.

== Today ==
Today the main campus caters to all year levels while the Helen Fraiser Campus contains the arts classes and gym.
