= Minnie Elizabeth Cawthorn =

Australian headmistress and aviator (1898–1966)

- Born: 23 August 1898; Prahran, Victoria, Australia
- Died: 10 May 1966 (aged 67)
- Known for: leading Matthew Flinders Girls Secondary College
- Partner: Ann Hooper

Minnie Elizabeth Cawthorn (23 August 1898 – 10 May 1966) was an Australian headmistress and aviator. She transformed what is now Matthew Flinders Girls Secondary College from dilapidated to pristine.

== Life ==
Cawthorn was born in Prahran in 1898. She was the third child of Fanny Adelaide, née Williams and William Cawthorn. Her English-born father was a commercial traveller who went to work in publishing. She and her elder brother, Walter Cawthorn, trained to be schoolteachers.

When she was senior mistress at Mildura High School in 1939 she found time to learn to fly and then qualified as a flying instructor.

In 1948, Cawthorn became the head of a school in Geelong. The school in Geelong had been named by Governor, Major General Edward Macarthur after Captain Matthew Flinders in 1856, but was now said to be "dilapidated" and "a dumping ground" for girls who would work in the mills as soon as they were fourteen. She took over from Frances Higgins and decided that the students should not just be trained for the mills and to be housewives but to be contributing citizens. The school was renamed the "Matthew Flinders Girls School", two new wings were built and the grounds were pristine. In 1950 the first students to sit the "Girls' Leaving Certificate" in Victoria were at this school.

With her partner and deputy Ann Hooper, she would surf and was known to turn catherine wheels for fun, although this aspect of her character was hidden from the girls. Discipline was strong at the school with a lot of marching and teachers who failed to meet Cawthorn's standards did not stay long.

Her partner died and Mary Lazarus took over the headship leaving time Cawthorn to travel. She died in 1966.
