= Edward Carter Preston =

English artist

Edward Carter Preston (7 July 1885 – 2 March 1965) was an English artist, renowned as a sculptor and medallist.

== Biography ==
An example of a First World War memorial plaque designed by Edward Carter Preston

Preston was born, and died, in Liverpool. He designed the bronze memorial plaques presented to the families of British servicemen and women who died during the First World War. A major commission for Preston began in 1931 when the architect Giles Gilbert Scott asked him to produce a series of sculptures for the Liverpool Anglican Cathedral. The project was an immense undertaking which occupied the artist for the next thirty years. The work for the cathedral included fifty sculptures, ten memorials and several reliefs. He also exhibited works at the Royal Scottish Academy Exhibition 1938.

Preston was the brother-in-law of sculptor Herbert Tyson Smith and was the father of the potter Julia Carter Preston.

== Bibliography ==
- Edward Carter Preston 1885–1965, published by Liverpool University Press (ISBN 0-85323-792-1)
