= Andrew Gillison =

Scottish-born Australian minister (1868–1915)

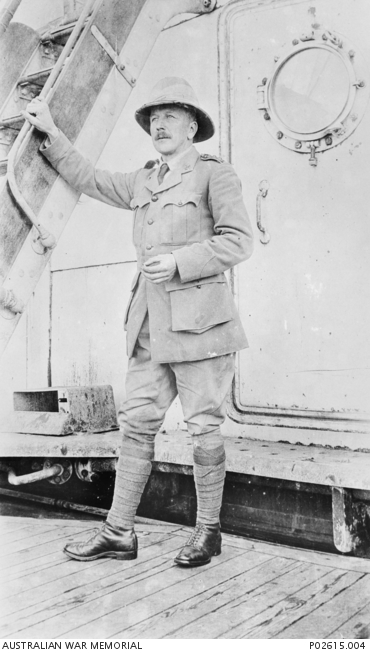
Gillison aboard a ship, c. 1915

Captain Andrew Gillison (7 June 1868 – 22 August 1915) was an Australian minister who served as a Presbyterian chaplain in the Australian Army. He was born and educated in Scotland and practised there as a minister. Gillison also served in the Volunteer Force's Queen's Edinburgh Rifles. He emigrated to Australia in 1903 to take up a post at St Paul's Presbyterian Church, Spring Hill, and, from 1909, at St George's Church in St Kilda East, Victoria.

Gillison was appointed a chaplain to the Australian military in 1906. After the outbreak of the First World War he was appointed a chaplain-captain to the 14th Battalion. He was posted with them to the Dardanelles campaign and landed at Anzac Cove within the first few days of the operation. During the campaign Gillison assisted with wounded soldiers, buried the dead and carried out religious services. Despite his non-combatant status he took up arms to snipe at Turkish soldiers. Gillison was killed on the second day of the Battle of Hill 60 while trying to retrieve a wounded soldier from no man's land.

== Early life ==
Gillison was born on 7 June 1868 at Baldernock, Stirlingshire, Scotland. His father was John Gillison, a minister in the Free Church of Scotland, and his mother was Jane Broatch. He was educated at George Watson's College in Edinburgh and the University of Edinburgh from which he received Bachelor of Divinity and Master of Arts degrees in 1889. From 1885 to 1887 he served in the Queen's Edinburgh Rifles of the Volunteer Force and was an avid target shooter. Gillison went on to study theology at New College, Edinburgh, from 1890 to 1894.

After completing his studies Gillison served in a religious role in the United States, Edinburgh, and England and married Isobel Napier in 1895. He became minister of the Free Church in Maryhill, Glasgow, in 1897. During this time he was closely involved in ministering to soldiers of the barracks that adjoined the church. Gillison emigrated to Australia in 1903 with his wife and his then three surviving children, to become minister at St Paul's Presbyterian Church, Spring Hill, in Brisbane. In 1909 he was appointed minister of St George's Church in St Kilda East, Victoria, one of the church's most important posts in the state.

== Army chaplain ==
Gillison was appointed chaplain to the part-time role of Australian military forces on 9 November 1906. From 1909 he was assigned as chaplain of the Victorian Scottish Regiment. On 23 October 1914, soon after the outbreak of the First World War, Gillison was appointed as chaplain-captain (4th class) in the Australian Imperial Force. He requested, and was granted, a posting to the 14th Battalion as he respected its commander Lieutenant-Colonel Richard Edmond Courtney. Gillison was one of the few Australian chaplains with prior military experience. He was responsible for introducing a number of British military traditions to his unit including the consecration of its colours, after they were presented by Governor-General Sir Ronald Munro Ferguson on 13 December 1914 and their subsequent consignment to his church for safeguarding while it served abroad.

Gillison joined his battalion as part of the 4th Brigade posted for service in the planned Dardanelles campaign. Gillison's parishioners were generous with parting gifts and he received two cameras, a set of binoculars, a pistol, a wristwatch, an attaché case and a purse containing 20 guineas. They also donated £250 (equivalent to £24,941 in 2025) in cash and sports equipment for use by the battalion.

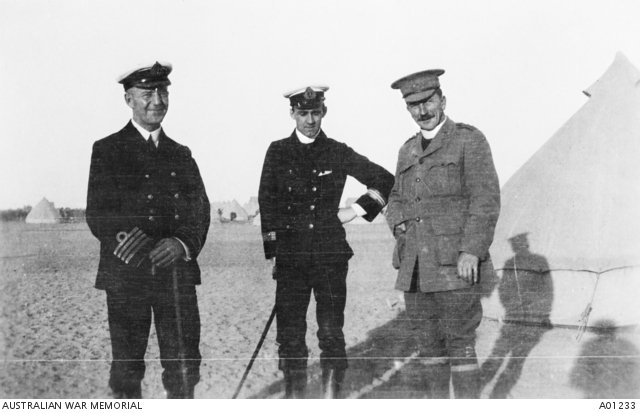
Gillison (right) with Paymaster Scotland and Captain Brewis of HMAT Ulysses at Heliopolis Camp, Cairo, Egypt in 1915

The brigade departed on 22 December; Gillison travelled aboard HMAT Ulysses and made brief stops at Albany, Western Australia; Colombo, British Ceylon; and Aden Colony before arriving at Egypt on 3 February 1915. During the journey Gillison helped to censor soldiers' post home, made daily visits to the ship's hospital and brig and conducted Sunday services. In Egypt the brigade undertook training, which Gillison took part in. He also attended lectures, visited Coptic churches, museums and sites of antiquity such as the pyramids and Great Sphinx of Giza. Gillison served as secretary of the battalion's officers' mess and treasurer of the battalion fund. He became well liked in the brigade for his singing of comic songs and participation in a boxing tournament.

=== Gallipoli ===
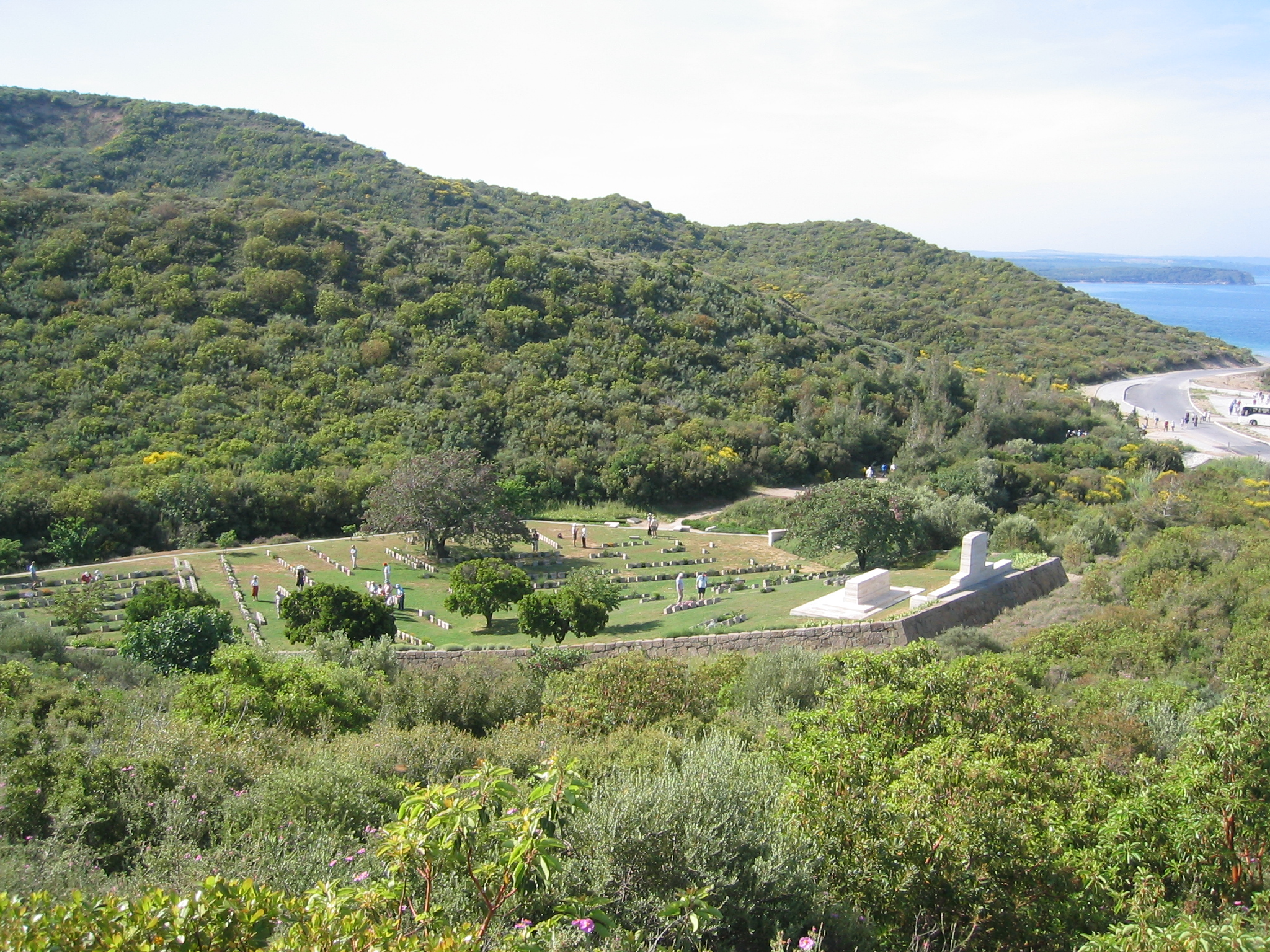
Shrapnel Valley Cemetery

Australian and other British Empire forces landed at Anzac Cove in Gallipoli on 25 April 1915, beginning the land phase of the Dardanelles campaign. Gillison watched the events from a destroyer and commented on the enthusiasm displayed by the troops. He set foot on the shore at 11:00 pm on 26 April but he was following an erroneous order and returned to his ship to carry out a burial service for eight men and to help care for some of the wounded. He landed properly on 27 April as, what he believed to be, the second chaplain to do so.

Gillison initially served at a casualty clearing station near to the beach but was later posted to a dressing station and to the hospital ship Seang Choon. He worked to console the wounded and bury the dead of all denominations, going as far as reading Catholic services. Corporal J. W. Barr of the 2nd Field Ambulance wrote of Gillison: that "stained by earth and the blood of fellow men, he was grandly eloquent, his clothes and appearance telling us what he did not. They spoke of Christian ministration while he supported the weakening frame from which the soul was speeding; a Christ-like devotion to his fellow-men that found him near them in their last moments". Gillison was responsible for laying out the burial areas at Shrapnel Valley Cemetery which became one of the largest in the area. He laid out four separate areas for men of different units, a system that was maintained until the end of the operation. Gillison was involved in arranging a truce on 24 May to allow burial of a large number of dead lying in no man's land. For his activities in the campaign he was recommended by his superiors for recognition on 20 June 1915. Gillison subsequently received a mention in despatches from General Ian Hamilton, commander of the Mediterranean Expeditionary Force, on 11 December 1915.

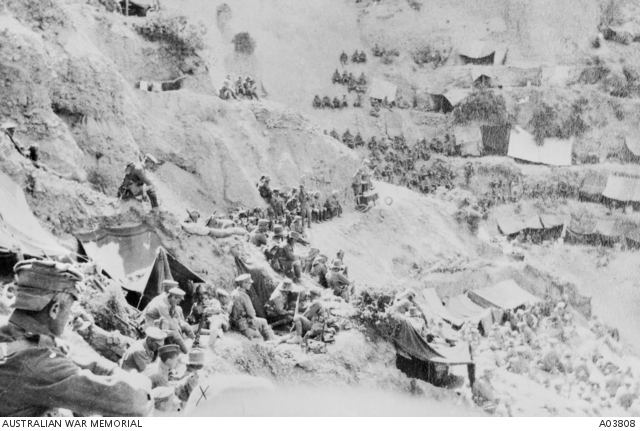
The 6 August 1915 church service conducted by Gillison before the Chunuk Bair offensive

Gillison later served directly with his battalion. In spite of his non-combatant status Gillison made use of his target-shooting experience in counter-sniping against the Turkish forces. The 4th Brigade was held in reserve for the Battle of Chunuk Bair and on the day before the attack (6 August) Gillison held a service in which the massed men sang the hymn "Lead, Kindly Light". In the event, the main attacking forces of 1st Brigade were successful and the 4th Brigade was not called upon to reinforce them.

=== Death ===
On 21 August the British Empire forces launched the Battle of Hill 60, one of the last major offensives in Gallipoli and an attempt to unite the Anzac Cove front with that at Suvla Bay. British, Australian, New Zealand and Indian troops were involved. After the failure of the first day's attack many wounded were left lying in no man's land, at risk of burning to death from fires caused by exploding shells. Gillison, his battalion's medical officer Captain Henry Loughran and a former Methodist minister, Corporal Robert Pittendirgh were active that night in bringing in the casualties.

The following day Gillison was in the front line trench, waiting to read a burial service when he heard the cries of a wounded man left on the field. The man was a soldier of the Royal Hampshire Regiment, who was being stung by ants. Loughran warned that rescue was impossible as the route to the man was covered by Turkish rifle and machine gun positions but Gillison, Pittendirgh and Private Arthur Wild decided to attempt a rescue. Gillison and Pittendirgh reached the wounded man and carried him about a metre before both men were hit. Gillison was hit by bullets, including one that passed between his shoulders and into his chest. Pittendirgh successfully returned to the Australian trench but Gillison collapsed short of it and was brought in by others, Wild escaped unharmed.

Gillison was carried back to the 16th Casualty Clearing Station but died a few hours after being hit. He spoke with three fellow chaplains before his death, which happened around 2:00 pm. His words included discussion of his family in Melbourne and to comment that "I'm just a servant, going home to my Master". Gillison was buried that night at Embarkation Pier Cemetery in Anzac Cove. The service was conducted by Chaplain-Colonel E. N. Merrington and attended by a number of chaplains of many denominations and officers and men of his battalion and brigade. Pittendirgh was evacuated but died of his wounds whilst at sea.

=== Legacy ===
Gillison was the first Australian army chaplain to be killed in the war and the only one to be killed in Gallipoli. The 14th Battalion's 1929 official history notes that with his death "the 14th suffered the greatest loss it had yet incurred in the death of any one man". Gillison's diary is in the collection of the Australian War Memorial (AWM) and covers a period from 1 November 1914 until his death. The last words in his diary relate to the presence of around 200 Turkish dead in no man's land in front of his post: "I never beheld such a sickening sight in my life and hope it may not be my lot again. The way that rifles and equipment left on the battlefield were wrecked with bullets was a revelation of the extent of rifle and machine gun fire". The AWM also holds his purse, containing three Turkish 20 piastre coins, and his next-of-kin's Memorial Plaque. Gillison's grave lies in the Embarkation Pier Cemetery, cared for by the Commonwealth War Graves Commission, and his grave marker includes the personal inscription "Their glory shall not be blotted out". Gillison was survived by his wife, three sons and a daughter. One son was Douglas Napier Gillison, who wrote the official history of the Royal Australian Air Force for 1939–42.

The congregation of St George's Church and members of his battalion (who raised £74 6s 2d) ensured Gillison was remembered in his former church. On 31 March 1917 a communion table at the church was dedicated in his honour in a morning service by Senior-Chaplain the Reverend Macrae Stewart and during that day's evening service Chaplain-General Professor J. Laurence Rentoul unveiled a memorial tablet. Both services were well attended and the evening one overspilled the church.
