= Memorial Plaque (medallion) =

Issued in UK to commemorate World War I dead

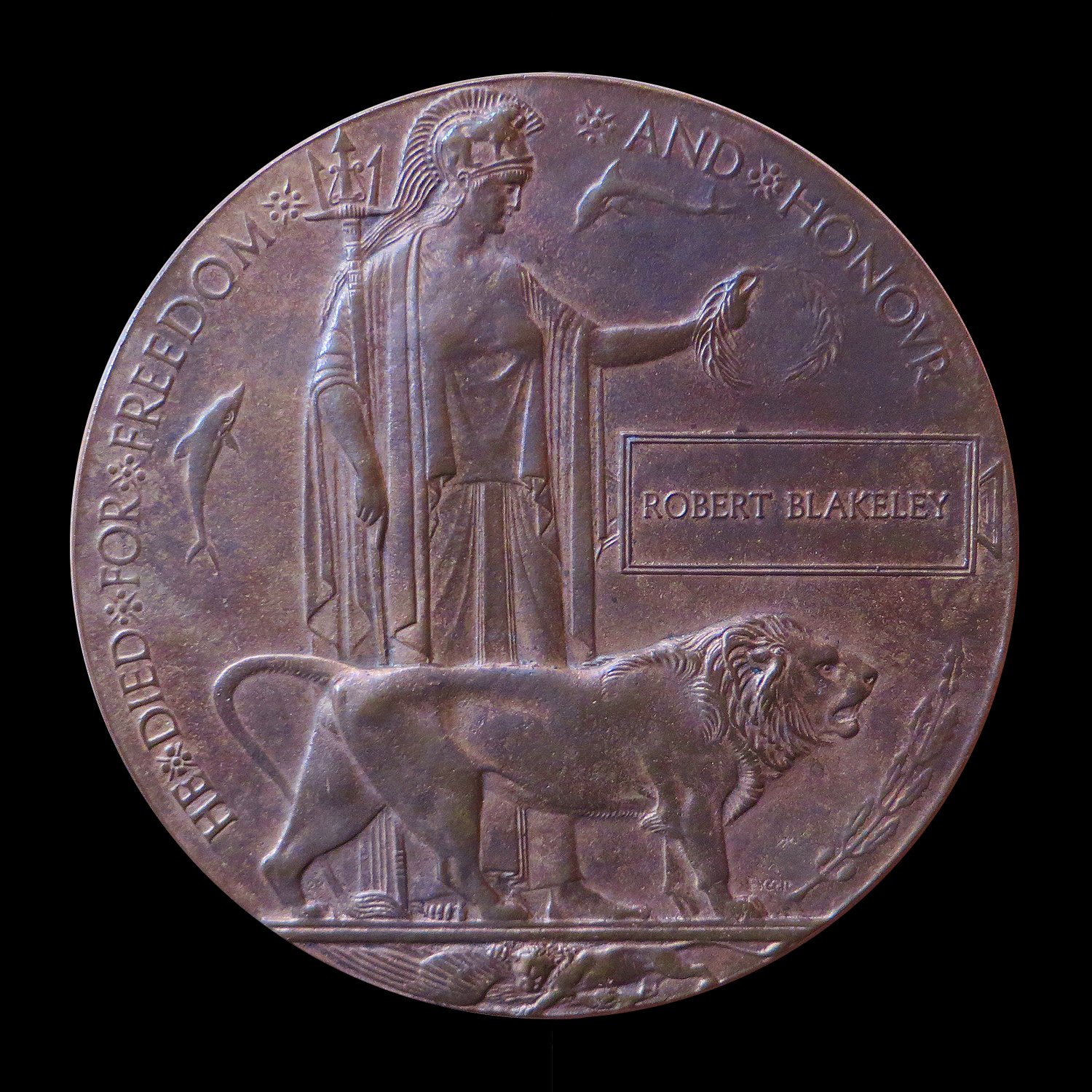
First World War memorial plaque

The Memorial Plaque was issued after the First World War to the next-of-kin of all British Empire service personnel who were killed as a result of the war.

The plaques (which could be described as large plaquettes) about 120 mm (4.7 in) in diameter, were cast in bronze, and came to be known as the Dead Man's Penny, Death Penny, or Widow's Penny because of the superficial similarity to the much smaller penny coin (which had a diameter of only 30.86 mm (1.215 in)). 1,355,000 plaques were issued, which used a total of 450 tons of bronze, and continued to be issued into the 1930s to commemorate people who died as a consequence of the war.

With so many produced, they are very common on the UK art market. In 2025 an example commemorating a male typically fetches around £50 at auction, but the much less common examples for women cost many times that.

== Description ==
It was decided that the design of the plaque was to be chosen from submissions made in a public competition. Over 800 designs were submitted and the competition was won by the sculptor and medallist Edward Carter Preston using the pseudonym Pyramus, receiving two first place prizes of £250 for his winning and also an alternative design. The name Pyramus comes from the story of Pyramus and Thisbē which is part of Ovid's Metamorphoses, a Roman tragedy narrative poem.

Carter Preston's winning design includes an image of Britannia holding a trident and standing with a lion. The designer's initials, E.CR.P., appear above the front paw. In her outstretched left hand Britannia holds an olive wreath above the ansate tablet bearing the deceased's name cast in raised letters. Below the name tablet, to the right of the lion, is an oak spray with acorns. The name does not include the rank since there was to be no distinction between sacrifices made by different individuals. Two dolphins swim around Britannia, symbolizing Britain's sea power, and at the bottom a second lion is tearing apart the German eagle. The reverse is blank, making it a plaquette rather than a table medal. Around the picture the legend reads (in capitals) "He died for freedom and honour", or for the approximately 600 plaques issued to commemorate women, "She died for freedom and honour".

They were initially made at the Memorial Plaque Factory, 54/56 Church Road, Acton, W3, London from 1919. Early Acton-made plaques did not have a number stamped on them but later ones have a number stamped behind the lion's back leg.

In December 1920 manufacture was shifted to the Royal Arsenal, Woolwich. Plaques manufactured here can be identified by a circle containing the initials "WA" on the back (the "A" being formed by a bar between the two upward strokes of the "W") and by a number stamped between the tail and leg (in place of the number stamped behind the lion's back leg).

The design was altered slightly during manufacture at Woolwich by Carter Preston since there was insufficient space in the original design between the lion's back paw and the H in "HE" to allow an "S" to be inserted to read "SHE" for the female plaques. The modification was to make the H slightly narrower to allow the S to be inserted. After around 1500 female plaques had been manufactured the moulds were modified to produce the male version by removing the S.

The plaques were issued in a pack with a commemorative scroll from King George V. Sometimes the letter and scroll were sent first.

== Adaptations ==
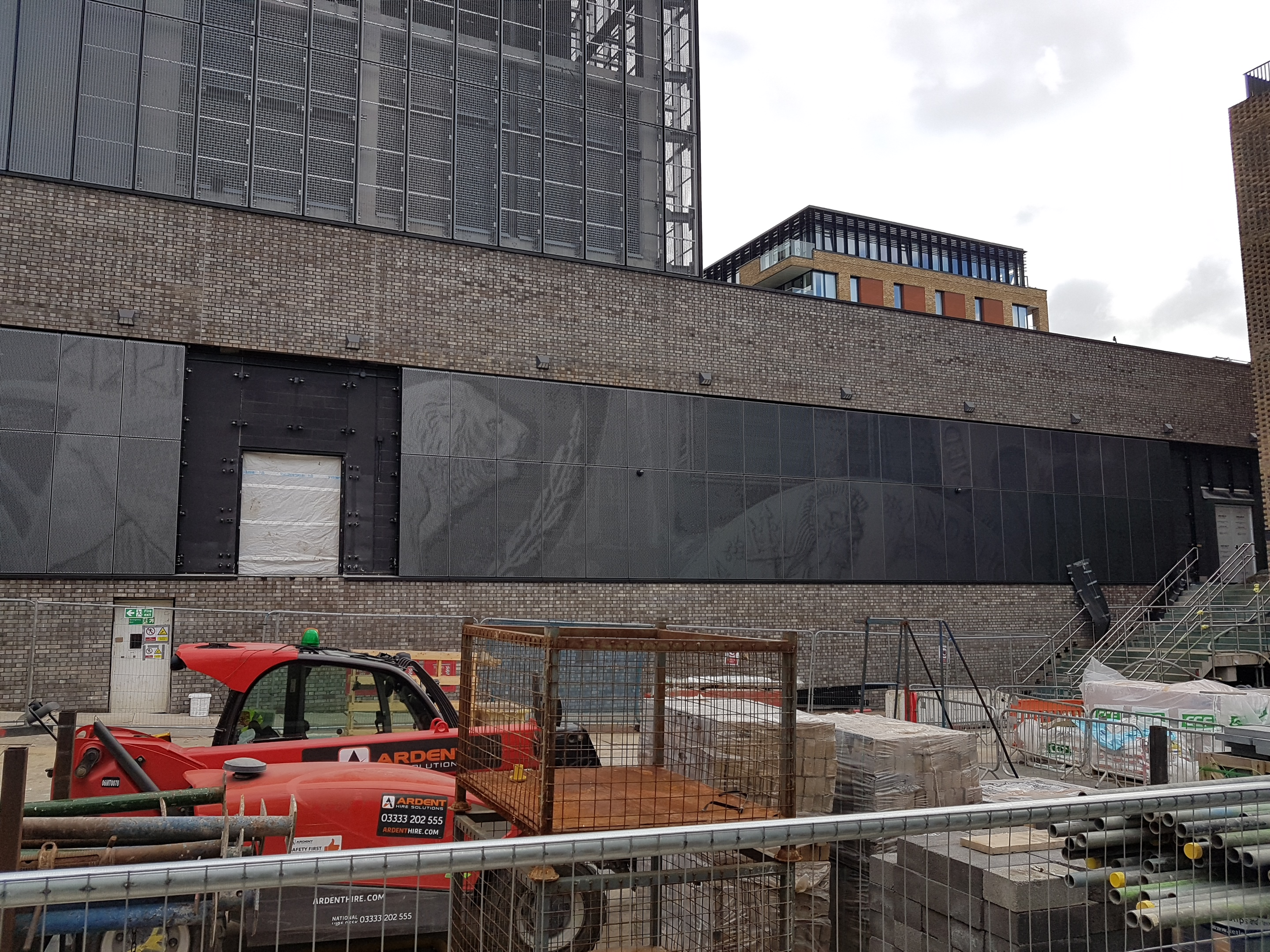
Wall decoration based on the Memorial Plaque at Woolwich Station

Smaller or miniature unofficial bronze plaques were produced by other manufacturers, for example Wright and Sons of Edgware, Middlesex, who sold them for 13 shillings and sixpence each.

Modern replicas have also been made, and occasionally offered as genuine.

In 2019, an artwork was installed on the northern wall of the new Woolwich Station (built by the Crossrail project for the Elizabeth line) which is situated within the Royal Arsenal, Woolwich, where the plaques were produced by the thousands. The design of the wall decoration is based on the Memorial Plaque.
