= Mick Shann =

Australian public servant

Sir Mick Shann CBE
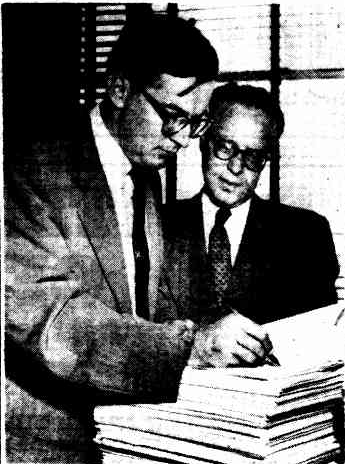
- Shann (left) signs the United Nations General Agreement on Tariffs and Trade agreement in July 1951, in the presence of A. H. Feller.

6th Australian Ambassador to Indonesia
- In office 6 November 1962 – 6 April 1966
- Preceded by: Patrick Shaw
- Succeeded by: Max Loveday

6th Australian Ambassador to Japan
- In office 1973 – 27 March 1977
- Preceded by: Gordon Freeth
- Succeeded by: John Menadue

Chairman of the Public Service Board
- In office 28 March 1977 – 1978
- Preceded by: Alan Cooley
- Succeeded by: William Cole

Personal details
- Born: Keith Charles Owen Shann; 22 November 1917 Melbourne, Australia
- Died: 4 August 1988 (aged 70) Sydney, Australia
- Spouse: Betty Evans (m. 1944)
- Education: University of Melbourne
- Occupation: Public servant; diplomat

Sir Keith Charles Owen "Mick" Shann CBE (22 November 1917 – 4 August 1988) was a senior Australian public servant and diplomat.

== Life and career ==
Mick Shann was born in the Melbourne suburb of Kew, Victoria, on 22 November 1917. His father was Frank Shann, a respected teacher and headmaster. He studied arts at the University of Melbourne, where he was in residence at Trinity College from 1936 to 1936, winning the Alcock Scholarship.

Shann's first Commonwealth Public Service positions were at the Bureau of Census and Statistics in 1939 and the Department of Labour and National Service from 1940 to 1946. In 1946, he moved to the Department of External Affairs in Canberra to take up an appointment as second secretary of the United Nations Division in the department.

In 1955, Shann was appointed Minister to the Philippines.

From 1962 to 1966 Shann was Australian Ambassador to Indonesia, during the time of the Indonesia–Malaysia confrontation. Shann perceived "clouds of mistrust" preventing close ties between the neighbouring countries at the time, suggesting that Indonesians were "puzzled at Australia being a European outcrop on the edge of Asia", but that Australia had no reason to fear Indonesia.

In 1970, Shann was appointed a Deputy Secretary in the Department of External Affairs, shortly before it was renamed the Department of Foreign Affairs. In this role until 1973, he worked alongside Departmental secretary Keith Waller to raise the department's reputation and morale. During his time in the Deputy Secretary role, he insisted that the department's staff should go back on regular Public Service classifications and salary levels and the formal separation between diplomatic and administrative foreign affairs staff should be abolished.

Shann was appointed Australian Ambassador to Japan in 1973. From Japan, he was appointed chairman of the Public Service Board, commencing in the role from 28 March 1977. After 17 months as board chairman, Shann resigned from the Public Service at age 60, citing personal and family reasons.

Shann died on 4 August 1988, at 70 years of age.

== Awards and honours ==
Shann was made a Commander of the Order of the British Empire in January 1964 while he was Ambassador in Jakarta. He was appointed a Knight Bachelor in June 1980.

In 2012, a street in the Canberra suburb of Casey was named Mick Shann Terrace in Shann's honour.

Diplomatic posts
Preceded by John Hood as Permanent Representative	Permanent Representative of Australia to the United Nations (Acting); 1950–1951	Succeeded by Bill Forsyth as Permanent Representative
Preceded by George Dunbar Moore	Australian Minister to the Philippines; 1955–1957	Succeeded by Alfred Stirling
Preceded by George Dunbar Moore	Australian Ambassador to the Philippines; 1957–1959	Succeeded by Alfred Stirling
Preceded by Patrick Shaw	Australian Ambassador to Indonesia; 1962–1966	Succeeded by Max Loveday
Preceded by Gordon Freeth	Australian Ambassador to Japan; 1973–1977	Succeeded by John Menadue
Government offices
Preceded by Alan Cooley	Chairman of the Public Service Board; 1977–1978	Succeeded by William Cole
