= Australia–Iran relations =

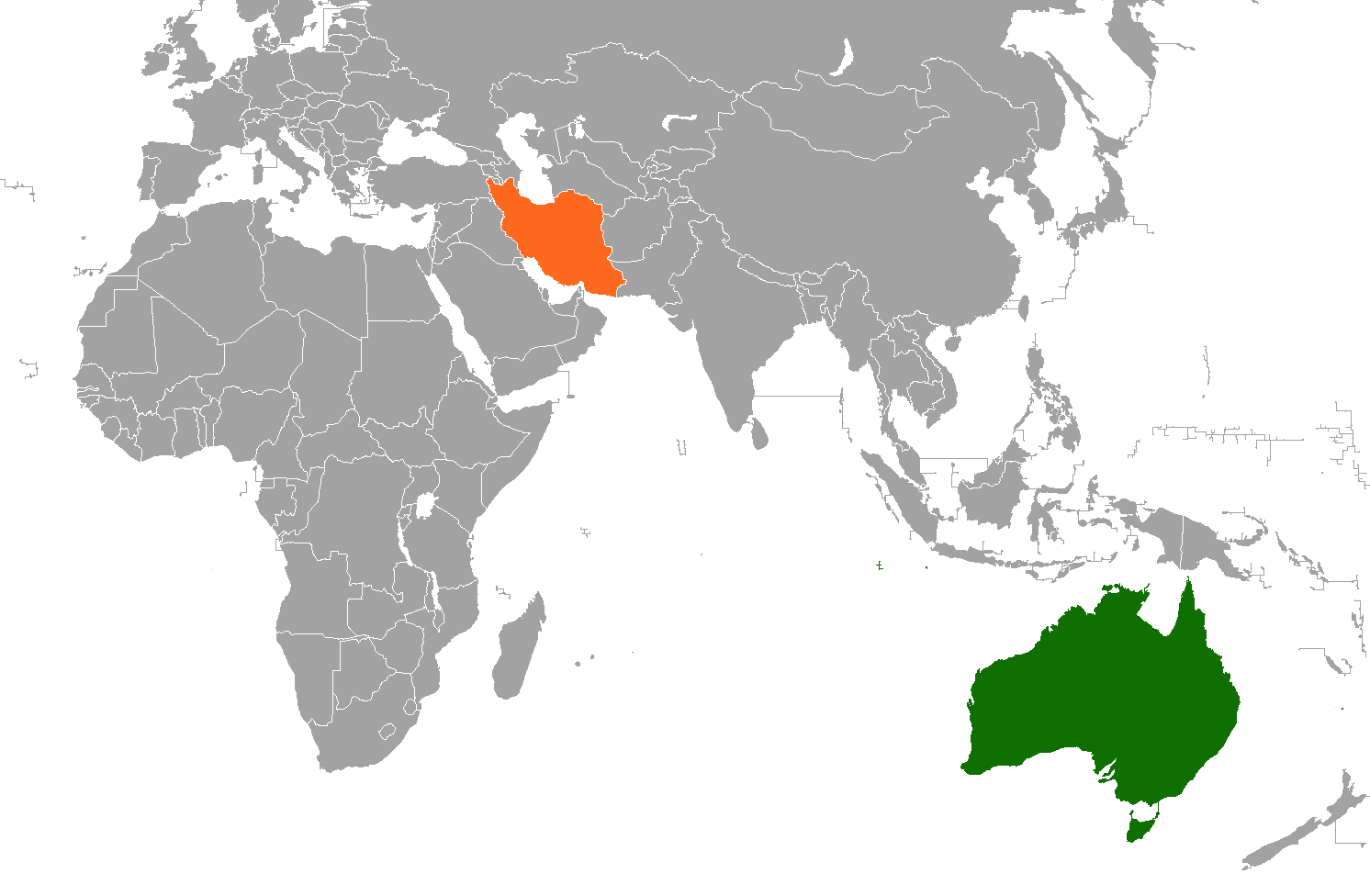

- Australia: Iran

Diplomatic mission
- Embassy of Iran, Canberra Ambassador expelled: Embassy of Australia, Tehran; Suspended consular actions

Monthly value (A$ millions) of Australian merchandise exports to Iran since 1988

Monthly value of Iranian merchandise exports to Australia (A$ millions) since 1988

Australia and Iran maintain bilateral relations. Australia had maintained, despite a strenuous relationship, a continuous diplomatic presence in Iran from 1968 to 2025. Iran, in kind, has had an embassy in Canberra from 1971 to 2025.

In August 2025, the relationship severely deteriorated after the Australian prime minister announced that the Australian Security Intelligence Organisation had concluded that Iran had ordered several clandestine terrorist attacks inside Australia during 2024. Australia expelled the Iranian ambassador and other Iranian consular staff, declaring them persona non grata. Australia also ceased operations at the Australian embassy in Tehran, and declared the Islamic Revolutionary Guard Corps a terrorist organisation.

Australia, like most Western countries, has expressed concerns about Iran's human-rights record and its nuclear-weapons program, and has issued sanctions against Iran for abuse and violations of human rights as well as for supplying drones to assist Russia in its war against Ukraine.

According to the 2004 census, 18,798 people in Australia have Iranian ancestry. It is estimated that 25,000 people of Iranian descent live in Australia, most of whom came after the 1979 Iranian Revolution.

Australia officially listed Islamic Revolutionary Guard Corps (IRGC) as a "state sponsor of terrorism" after its security services concluded the IRGC orchestrated antisemitic arson attacks in Sydney and Melbourne.

== History ==
Australian envoys attended the Non-Aligned Movement Summit in Tehran, Iran in August 2012.

Australia's Minister for Foreign Affairs Julie Bishop visited Iran in April 2015, at the invitation of Iranian Foreign Minister Mohammad Javad Zarif. The visit was the first visit of an Australian minister since Alexander Downer in 2003. During a private meeting, the Ministers discussed Australia wanting Iran to accept Iranian asylum seekers denied entry to Australia, trade between the two nations and the fight against Islamic State. Leaders were also optimistic that lifting of global sanctions on Iran would boost business opportunities for Australia and economic activity in Iran. Australia and Iran also agreed to share intelligence about ISIS, whereby Australia would receive information on Australians who have gone to Iraq to fight for ISIS.

Following the United States strikes on Iranian nuclear sites in June 2025, Australian Prime Minister Anthony Albanese and Foreign Minister Penny Wong voiced support for the operation.

On 26 August 2025, Albanese announced that he would expel Iran's ambassador, and that Australia would cease diplomatic actions in Iran, following an assessment by the Australian Security Intelligence Organisation that Iran had "directed" the attack on Lewis Continental Kitchen (a kosher restaurant in North Bondi) in October 2024, as well as the December 2024 Melbourne synagogue attack. Australia also declared the Islamic Revolutionary Guard Corps as a terrorist organisation.

In response, Iranian Foreign Ministry spokesperson Esmaeil Baghaei denied the Australian Government's accusations and vowed a reciprocal diplomatic retaliation. He claimed Australia's actions were motivated by domestic politics including the pro-Palestine protests and accused Canberra of siding with Israel. On 27 August, Home Affairs Minister Tony Burke rejected the Iranian government's claims that Israeli interference had prompted the Australian government to expel Iran's ambassador. New Zealand has expressed support for Australia's actions but has ruled out expelling the Iranian ambassador to New Zealand.

On 21 October 2025, based on the Foreign Influence Transparency Scheme Act of 2018, the office of the Attorney-General's in Australia issued a provisional transparency notice which designated Iranian state media outlet Press TV as a foreign government entity, related to Iran.

On 18 November 2025, the designation of Press TV as a foreign government-related entity was finalised, and was formally listed on the Foreign Influence Transparency Scheme register. According to the scheme, foreign government associates are obligated to declare their political lobbying and communication activities, or face penalties of one to five years of imprisonment. Press TV was criticised as being a propaganda arm of the Iranian regime which promotes disinformation, social division, and erosion of public trust in democratic institutions.

On 27 November 2025, the Parliament of Australia formally listed the Islamic Revolutionary Guard Corps as a State Sponsor of Terrorism, under the framework of the Criminal Code Amendment (State Sponsors of Terrorism) Act 2025. The IRGC was the first entity to be designated as such, after the Minister of Home Affairs determined that it met the criteria specified in Division 110 of the code, thereby following the recommendations of Australian Government intelligence, security and policy agencies. According to the listing, it is "illegal to direct the activities of, be a member of, associate with members of, recruit for, train with, get funds to, from or for, or provide support to, the Iranian Revolutionary Guard Corp", with a penalty of 25 years of imprisonment.

During the 2025-2026 Iranian protests, the Australian embassy in Iran shutdown its operations. Australian citizens were urged by the government to leave Iran as soon as possible due to the violent crackdowns and arrests by Iranian security forces. Following the outbreak of the 2026 Iran war, the Albanese government expressed support for US and Israeli strikes, also stating Australia stood with "the brave people of Iran in their struggle against oppression".

On 10 March 2026, the federal government granted humanitarian visas to five members of the Iran women's national football team competing in the 2026 AFC Women's Asian Cup amid fears for their safety during the 2026 Iran war and their refusal to sing the Iranian national anthem during a match against South Korea. Two more Iranian footballers subsequently sought asylum in Australia, bringing the total number to seven.

In June 2026, following the announcement of an agreement between Iran and the United States, Australia's Prime Minister and Foreign Minister issued a joint statement welcoming the deal. They specifically expressed satisfaction that the agreement included steps to reopen the Strait of Hormuz, describing the reopening as essential for reducing pressure on energy prices and the broader economy, including Australia's own.

== Trade and sanctions ==
In October 2008, Australia imposed sanctions against Iran because of Iran's nuclear program and missile program and efforts to contravene United Nations Security Council sanctions. These sanctions were applied to gold, precious metals, and arms.

In July 2010, Australia imposed financial sanctions and travel bans on individuals and entities involved in Iran's nuclear and missile programs or who assist Iran in violating sanctions, and an arms embargo.

Australia imposed further sanctions in January 2013 to limit Australian business with oil, gas, petroleum and financial sectors in Iran. Foreign Minister of Australia Bob Carr said "These sanctions further increase pressure on Iran to comply with its nuclear non-proliferation obligations and with UN Security Council resolutions and to engage in serious negotiations on its nuclear program".

From 2014 to 2015, the two-way trade was more than $354 million. Most international sanctions on Iran were lifted in 2016, following the implementation of the Joint Comprehensive Plan of Action nuclear deal.

In 2023, the federal government in Australia issued Magnitsky-style financial sanctions and travel bans against 14 individuals and 14 Iranian entities, including four members of the Basij morality police, who were "responsible for egregious human rights abuses and violations in Iran". The sanctioned Basij members "were responsible for the arrest, detention and ill-treatment of Mahsa 'Jina' Amini", who was detained for not wearing her Hijab correctly and later died in custody. During the protests in the aftermath of her death hundreds were killed, thousands were arrested, four young men were hanged and more the a dozen others were sentenced to death. According to ABC News, Senator Wong said that the sanctions will also include political, military and law enforcement officials responsible for the oppression of the Iranian people. Further sanctions were issued against 13 Iranian individuals and one entity for the manufacture and supply of drones to Russia in its war against Ukraine.

In February 2026, the Australian government imposed sanctions on twenty Iranian people and three organizations in response to the Iranian government's "horrific use of violence against its own people" during the 2026 Iran massacres. During the 2026 Iran war, they restricted the entry of some Iranian visitors, to protect "the integrity of the country’s immigration system."

== See also ==
- Foreign relations of Australia
- Foreign relations of Iran
- List of ambassadors of Australia to Iran
- List of ambassadors of Iran to Australia
- Iranian Australians
- 2024 Iranian operations inside Australia
