= Marc Innes-Brown =

Australian diplomat (born 1966)

His Excellency Marc Innes-Brown
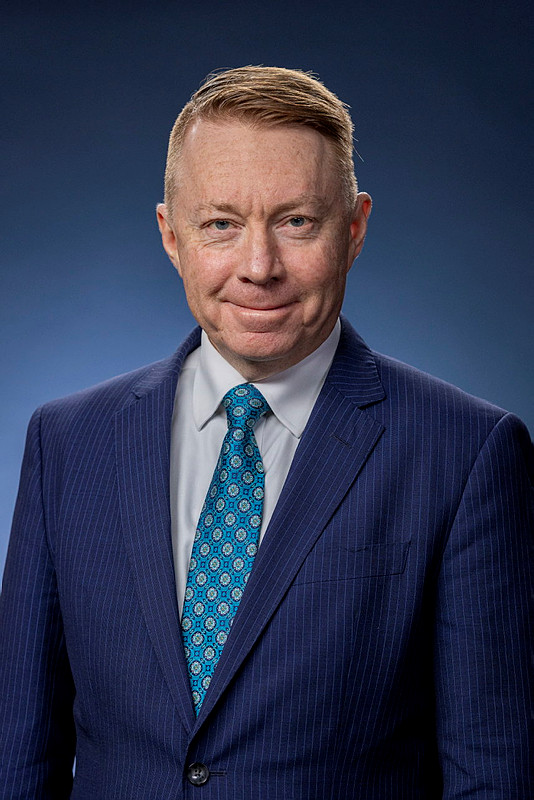

Ambassador of Australia to the Philippines
- Incumbent
- Assumed office August 19, 2025
- Preceded by: Hae Kyong Yu

Ambassador of Australia to Turkiye, Azerbaijan, and Georgia
- In office June 2017 – 2021
- Preceded by: James Larsen
- Succeeded by: Miles Armitage

Ambassador of Australia to Iran
- In office August 2008 – 2013
- Preceded by: Greg Moriarty
- Succeeded by: Paul Foley

Ambassador of Australia to Iraq
- In office August 2006 – 2008
- Preceded by: Howard Brown
- Succeeded by: Robert Tyson

Personal details
- Born: 1966 (age 59–60) Goulburn, New South Wales, Australia
- Education: University of Sydney (B), University of Hawaii (M)

Marc Innes-Brown is an Australian diplomat serving as Australia's ambassador to the Philippines since August 2025. He is a senior career officer with Australia's Department of Foreign Affairs and Trade (DFAT) and was most recently its First Assistant Secretary for the Middle East and Africa Division.

Innes-Brown has held a range of positions in DFAT, including as Assistant Secretary, Middle East Branch and Assistant Secretary, Iraq Taskforce. He has previously served as Australia's ambassador to Turkiye, Azerbaijan (non-resident), Georgia (non-resident), Iran, and Iraq.

Innes-Brown holds a bachelor of economics from the University of Sydney and a master of political science from the University of Hawaii.
