= List of high commissioners of Australia to Cyprus =

High Commissioner of Australia to Cyprus

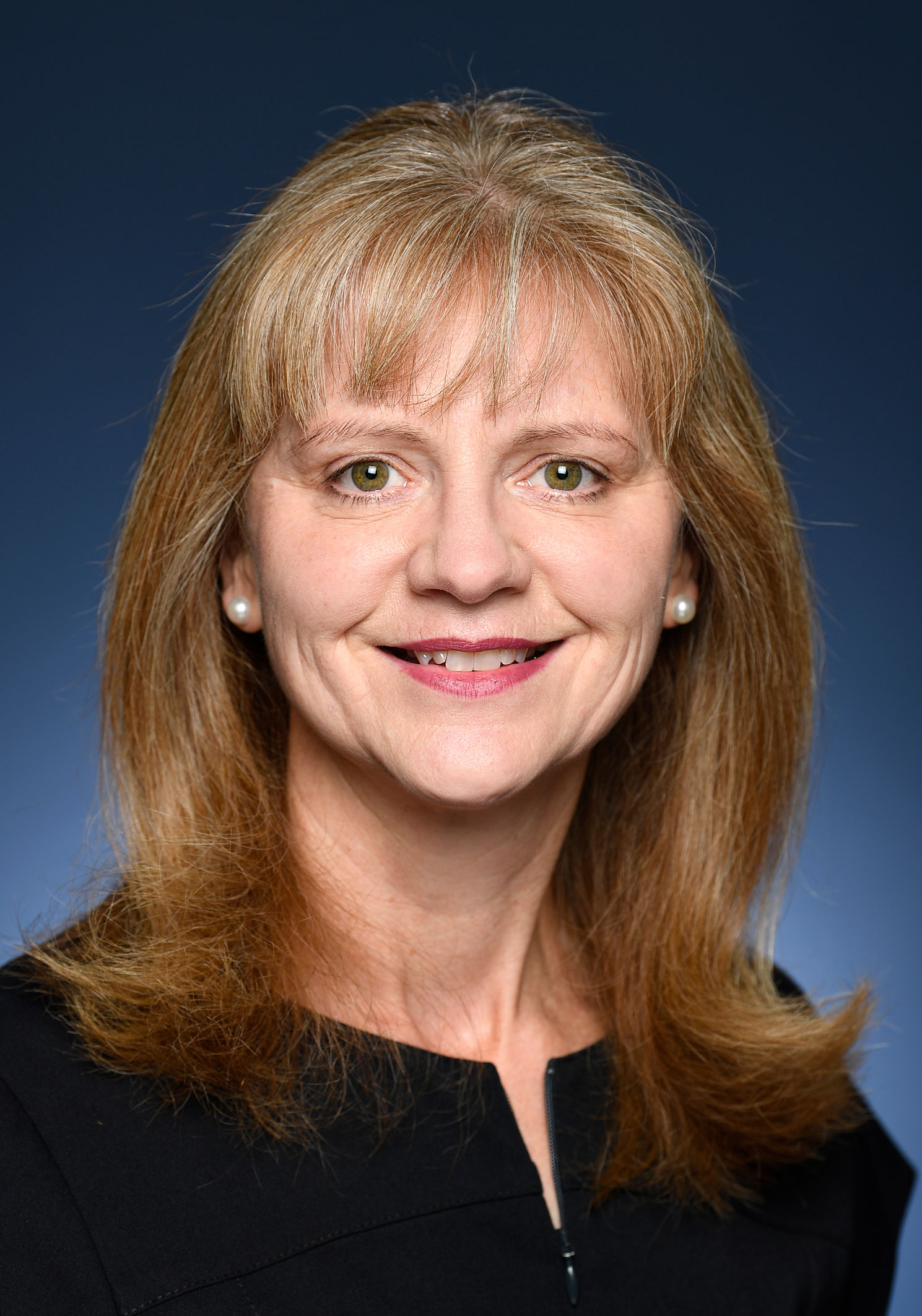
- Incumbent; Emily Pugin since January 2026
- Department of Foreign Affairs and Trade
- Style: Her Excellency
- Reports to: Minister for Foreign Affairs
- Residence: Nicosia
- Nominator: Prime Minister of Australia
- Appointer: Governor General of Australia
- Inaugural holder: Francis Hall (resident in Athens)
- Formation: 19 April 1973
- Website: Australian High Commission, Cyprus

The high commissioner of Australia to Cyprus is an officer of the Australian Department of Foreign Affairs and Trade and the head of the High Commission of the Commonwealth of Australia in Nicosia, with responsibility for both the internationally recognised Republic of Cyprus and the unrecognised Turkish Republic of Northern Cyprus. The position has the rank and status of an ambassador extraordinary and plenipotentiary and is currently held by Emily Pugin since January 2026. There has been a resident Australian high commissioner in Cyprus since 1982, from 1973 to 1982 the Ambassador to Greece held non-resident accreditation for Cyprus.

== Posting history ==
Following the independence of Cyprus on 16 August 1960, Australia maintained low level relations and contacts with the new Cypriot Government, with the Australian Embassy in Athens, Greece, having reporting responsibility for Cyprus. In response to a question on the status of Australia's relations with Cyprus from the Leader of the Opposition, Gough Whitlam, in the House of Representatives, on 28 March 1972 the Minister for Foreign Affairs, Nigel Bowen, noted to the Parliament: "Australia’s bilateral relations with the Republic of Cyprus have not been considered sufficiently substantial at this stage to justify the dual accreditation of an Australian high commissioner to Cyprus from another post. However, the Australian Embassy in Athens has a general responsibility for reporting on Cyprus and the staff of the Embassy visit Cyprus at regular intervals." However, not longer after this response, the Australian Government appointed the serving Ambassador to Greece, Francis Hall, as the non-resident accredited high commissioner to Cyprus from 19 April 1973. In July 1975, the Australian Government announced the establishment of a resident High Commission in Nicosia, initially under an acting high commissioner. The first resident high commissioner, Mary McPherson, commenced office from 9 February 1982.

== Heads of mission ==
=== High commissioners resident in Athens, Greece ===
Name	Start of term	End of term	References
Francis Hall	19 April 1973	July 1974	
Donald Horne	July 1974	June 1976	
Sir Les Johnson	June 1976	June 1980	
Marshall Johnston	June 1980	9 February 1982	

=== Resident high commissioners ===
Name	Start of term	End of term	References
Alister William Savage (Acting)	12 August 1975	December 1977	
Erica Fielding Grimwade (Acting)	December 1977	9 February 1982	
Mary McPherson	9 February 1982	4 October 1985	
David Wadham	4 October 1985	October 1988	
Edward Stevens	November 1988	December 1994	
John Sullivan	January 1995	December 1997	
Howard Craig Brown	January 1998	April 2000	
Franz Ingruber	April 2000	March 2004	
Garth Hunt	March 2004	June 2008	
Evan Williams	June 2008	August 2011	
Trevor Peacock	September 2011	September 2015	
Alan Sweetman	September 2015	September 2018	
Samuel Beever	September 2018	December 2021	
Fiona McKergow	January 2022	January 2026	
