= List of ambassadors of Australia to Thailand =

Ambassador of Australia to Thailand

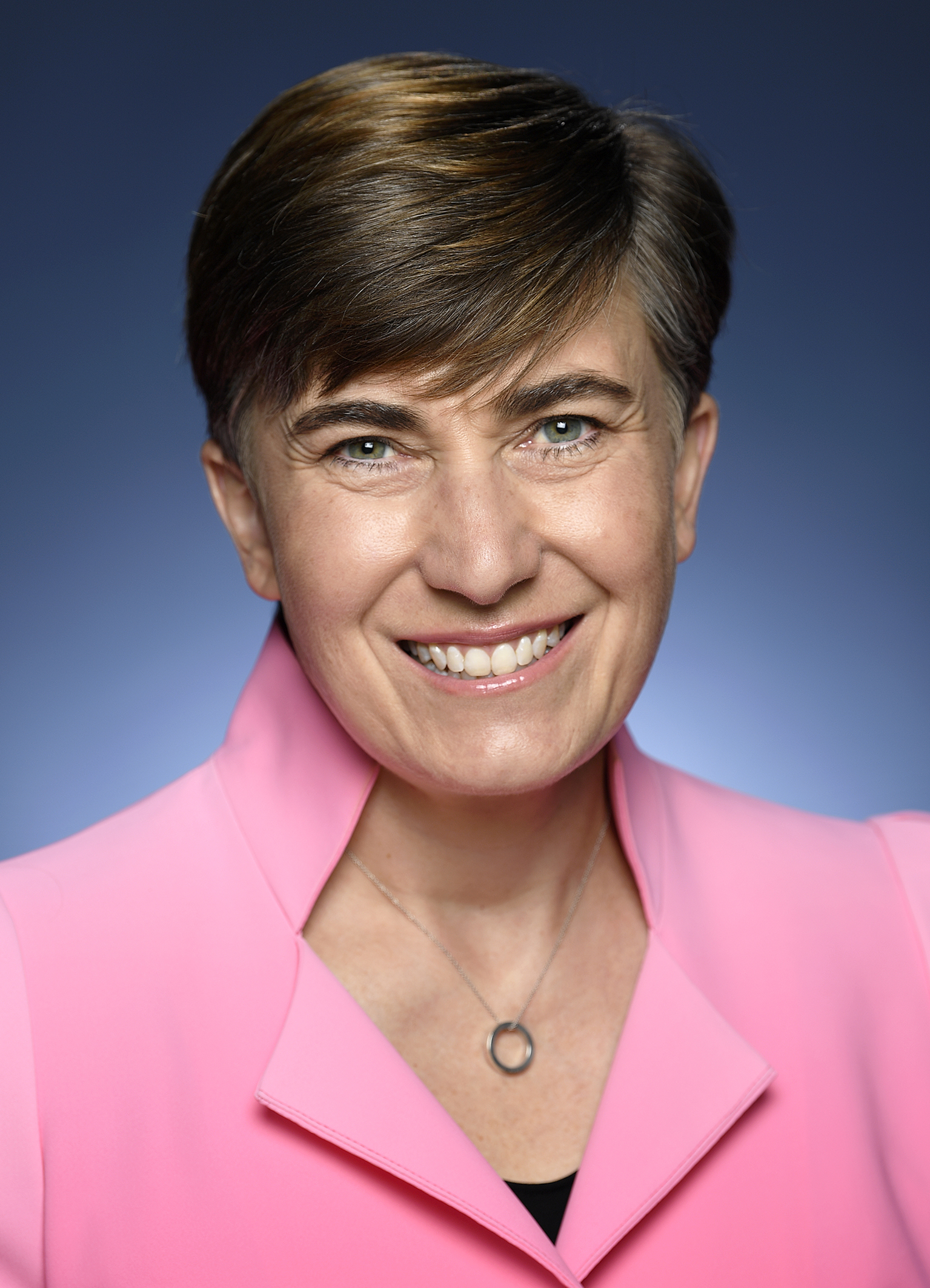
- Incumbent; Angela Macdonald since 6 July 2022
- Department of Foreign Affairs and Trade
- Style: Her Excellency
- Reports to: Minister for Foreign Affairs
- Residence: Bangkok
- Nominator: Prime Minister of Australia
- Appointer: Governor General of Australia
- Inaugural holder: Bertram Ballard
- Formation: 1952
- Website: Australian Embassy, Thailand

The Ambassador of Australia to Thailand is an officer of the Australian Department of Foreign Affairs and Trade and the head of the Embassy of the Commonwealth of Australia to the Kingdom of Thailand. The ambassador resides in Bangkok. The current ambassador, since July 2022, is Angela Macdonald. A consulate-general in Phuket has assisted the work of the embassy since 14 June 2016.

== List of heads of mission ==
=== Ambassadors ===
Ordinal	Officeholder	Term start date	Term end date	Time in office	Notes
1	Bertram Ballard	1952	1955	2–3 years	
2	David Hay	1955	1957	1–2 years	
3	Keith Waller	1958	1961	2–3 years	
4	Malcolm Booker	1962	1963	0–1 years	
5	Allan Loomes	1964	1968	3–4 years	
6	David McNicol	1968	1969	0–1 years	
7	Tom Critchley	1969	1973	3–4 years	
8	D. C. Goss	1974	1975	0–1 years	
9	Marshall Johnston	1975	1978	2–3 years	
10	Gordon Jockel	1978	1985	6–7 years	
11	Richard Smith	1985	1988	2–3 years	
12	Richard Butler	1989	1992	2–3 years	
13	John McCarthy	1992	1994	1–2 years	
14	Cavan Hogue	1994	1997	2–3 years	
15	William Fisher	1998	2000	1–2 years	
16	Miles Kupa	2000	2005	4–5 years	
17	Bill Paterson	2005	2008	2–3 years	
17	Paul Grigson	2008	2010	1–2 years	
18	James Wise	2010	October 2014	3–4 years	
19	Paul Robilliard	October 2014	January 2019	4 years, 3 months	
20	Allan McKinnon	January 2019	6 July 2022	3 years, 6 months	
21	Angela Macdonald	6 July 2022	incumbent	4 years, 133 days	

=== Consuls-General in Phuket ===
Ordinal	Officeholder	Term start date	Term end date	Time in office	Notes
1	Craig Ferguson	3 August 2016	2019	2–3 years	
2	Matthew Barclay	2019	incumbent	6–7 years	

== See also ==
- Australia–Thailand relations
- Foreign relations of Australia
- Foreign relations of Thailand
