= Alan Renouf =

Australian government official (1919–2008)

Alan Renouf OBE
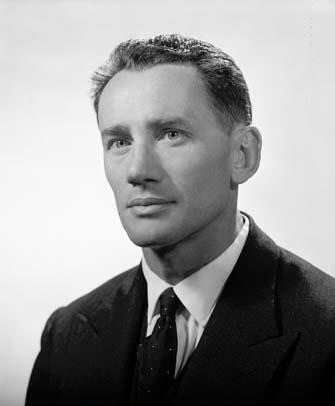

Secretary of the Department of Foreign Affairs
- In office 3 January 1974 – 18 February 1977

12th Ambassador of Australia to the United States
- In office 9 February 1976 – 20 May 1979
- Preceded by: Nick Parkinson
- Succeeded by: Robert B. Birch (Chargé d'affaires)

Personal details
- Born: Alan Phillip Renouf; 21 March 1919
- Died: 26 May 2008 (aged 89) Canberra, Australia
- Spouse: Emilia Mira Campins (m. 1948)
- Education: University of Sydney
- Occupation: Public servant

Alan Phillip Renouf OBE (21 March 1919 – 26 May 2008) was a prominent Australian government official during the 1970s.

== Life and career ==
Renouf joined the Commonwealth Public Service in the Department of External Affairs in 1943, after serving in the army.

In 1960, Renouf was appointed the first Australian High Commissioner to Nigeria, a position in which he remained until 1963. Between 1963 and 1965, Renouf worked at the Australian embassy in Washington, D.C. He and his wife returned to Canberra for less than a year before Renouf was named Australia's first Ambassador to Yugoslavia in August 1966, to begin his appointment in November.

From 1969 to 1973, Renouf was Australia's Ambassador to France. In 1969, he was named Australia's first Ambassador to Portugal, with the intent that he would continue to reside in Paris. From 1974 to 1977, Renouf was the permanent head of the Australian Department of Foreign Affairs. During 1978 and 1979 he was the Australian Ambassador to the United States.

Renouf wrote at least three books: The Frightened Country (1979), Let Justice Be Done. The Foreign Policy of Dr H.V. Evatt (1983) and Malcolm Fraser and Australian Foreign Policy (1986).

== Honours ==
In 1965, Reonuf was appointed an Officer of the Order of the British Empire.

Government offices
| Preceded by Keith Waller | Secretary of the Department of Foreign Affairs; 1974–1977 | Succeeded by Nick Parkinson |
Diplomatic posts
| New title Position established | Australian High Commissioner to Nigeria; 1960–1963 | Succeeded by L.E. Phillips |
| New title Position established | Australian Ambassador to Yugoslavia; 1967–1970 | Succeeded by Roy Fernandez |
| Preceded by Edward Ronald Walker | Australian Ambassador to France; 1970–1974 | Succeeded by Harold David Anderson |
| Preceded by Dr William Gardner Davies | Permanent Delegate of Australia to UNESCO; 1972–1973 | Succeeded by Harold David Anderson |
| Preceded by Nick Parkinson | Australian Ambassador to the United States; 1977–1979 | Succeeded by Nick Parkinson |
