= Marshall Johnston (diplomat) =

Australian public servant (1923–2017)

Marshall Johnston AO
- Born: Marshall Lewis Johnston; 20 July 1923; Canberra, Australian Capital Territory
- Died: 31 October 2017 (aged 94)
- Occupations: Public servant, diplomat

Marshall Lewis Johnston AO (20 July 1923 – 31 October 2017) was an Australian public servant and diplomat.

Johnston enlisted in the Australian Army in 1941, during World War II.

In June 1980 Johnston was appointed an Officer of the Order of Australia in recognition of his public service as a diplomatic representative.

Johnston retired from public service in 1984, his final post was as Australian Ambassador to Greece (1980–1984) and the non-resident High Commissioner to Cyprus (1980–1982). He died in October 2017 at the age of 94.

Diplomatic posts
Preceded by Frank Milne	Australian Ambassador to Burma; 1966–1967	Succeeded by Roy Fernandez
Preceded by William Landale	Australian Ambassador to Israel; 1970–1972	Succeeded by Rawdon Dalrymple
Preceded by Graham Feakes	Australian Ambassador to Cambodia; 1972–1975	Succeeded by Frank Milne as Chargé d'affaires
Preceded by D.C. Goss	Australian Ambassador to Thailand; 1975–1978	Succeeded by Gordon Jockel
Preceded by Ivor Bowden	Australian Ambassador to Iran; 1978–1979	Succeeded by Kevin Boreham as Charge d’Affaires
Preceded by Les Johnson	Australian Ambassador to Greece; 1980–1984	Succeeded by Donald Kingsmill
Preceded by Les Johnson	Australian High Commissioner to Cyprus; 1980–1982	Succeeded by Mary McPherson
