= Tom Critchley =

Australian public servant and journalist (1916–2009)

Tom Critchley AO CBE

Australian Ambassador to Indonesia
- In office 1978–1981
- Monarch: Elizabeth II
- Prime Minister: Malcolm Fraser
- Preceded by: Richard Woolcott
- Succeeded by: Rawdon Dalrymple

Australian High Commissioner to Papua New Guinea
- In office 1974–1978
- Monarch: Elizabeth II
- Prime Minister: Gough Whitlam (1974–75); Malcolm Fraser (1975–78)
- Preceded by: Les Johnson
- Succeeded by: Gerry Nutter

Australian Ambassador to Thailand
- In office 1969–1973
- Monarch: Elizabeth II
- Prime Minister: John Gorton (1969–71); William McMahon (1971–72); Gough Whitlam (1972–73)
- Preceded by: David McNicol
- Succeeded by: D.C. Goss

Australian High Commissioner to Malaysia
- In office 1955–1965
- Monarch: Elizabeth II
- Prime Minister: Sir Robert Menzies
- Preceded by: Position established
- Succeeded by: Allan Eastman

Personal details
- Born: 27 January 1916 Melbourne, Victoria
- Died: 14 July 2009 (aged 93) Sydney, New South Wales
- Spouse: Joyce Gwendolyn Hews (m. 1946–1954) Susan Cappell (m. 1962–2009)
- Education: University of Sydney
- Awards: Officer of the Order of Australia; Commander of the Order of the British Empire

Military service
- Allegiance: Australia
- Branch/service: Royal Australian Air Force (1941); Second Australian Imperial Force (1941–44)
- Years of service: 1941–1944
- Rank: Lieutenant
- Battles/wars: Second World War

Thomas Kingston Critchley, AO, CBE (27 January 1916 – 14 July 2009) was an Australian public servant, diplomat, author and journalist.

== Early life and education ==
Critchley was born in Melbourne but grew up at Longueville in Sydney and attended North Sydney Boys High School. He joined the Rural Bank after completing high school and attended the University of Sydney by night to study economics.

== Career ==
After the Second World War, Critchley joined the Department of External Affairs as the head of the economic relations section. His first diplomatic role with the department was assisting Australia's representation of Indonesia against the Dutch during the Indonesian National Revolution. He was on the United Nations Commission for Indonesia between 1947 and 1950 and played a role securing Indonesia's independence from the Dutch.

Critchley served as Australian High Commissioner to Malaysia (1955–1965); Ambassador to Thailand (1969–1973); High Commissioner to Papua New Guinea (1974–1978); and Ambassador to Indonesia (1978–1981).

== Personal life ==
Critchley's first marriage, to an English Foreign Office employee posted to New Delhi, Joyce Gwendolyn Hew, took place on 9 January 1946 in Delhi. The marriage was witnessed by High Commissioner to India Colin Moodie. Mrs Joyce Critchley followed her husband to Australia in May 1946. Critchley and Hew divorced in 1954.

Critchley, a keen surfer, golfer and tennis player, who also played piano, died on 14 July 2009, survived by his wife Susan and their four daughters.

Critchley's daughter, Laurie Critchley, is a television producer.

Diplomatic posts
New title Position established	Australian High Commissioner to Malaysia; 1955–1965	Succeeded by Allan Eastman
Preceded by David McNicol	Australian Ambassador to Thailand; 1969–1973	Succeeded by D.C. Goss
Preceded by Les Johnson	Australian High Commissioner to Papua New Guinea; 1974–1978	Succeeded by Gerry Nutter
Preceded by Richard Woolcott	Australian Ambassador to Indonesia; 1978–1981	Succeeded by Rawdon Dalrymple
