= 2024 Iranian operations inside Australia =

Terrorist incidents in Australia allegedly orchestrated by Iran

- Date: 20 October 2024 (Sydney); 6 December 2024 (Melbourne)
- Location: Sydney; Melbourne
- Type: Alleged state-sponsored terrorism
- Target: Jewish Australians; Jewish businesses and synagogues
- Organised by: Iran (evidence undisclosed): Islamic Revolutionary Guard Corps (IRGC)
- Outcome: Iranian ambassador to Australia expelled, given 3 days to leave the country; Embassy of Australia in Tehran closed until further notice; Australian diplomats evacuated from Iran to third country; IRGC listed as a state sponsor of terrorism
- Arrests: 9 (Sydney attack); 4 (Melbourne attack)
- Accused: Sayed Moosawi (Sydney attack); Wayne Ogden (Sydney attack); Giovanni Laulu (Melbourne attack); Younes Ali Younes (Melbourne attack); Unnamed man (Melbourne attack)

In 2024, the Islamic Revolutionary Guard Corps (IRGC), at the direction of the Iranian government, allegedly organised and carried out at least two terrorist attacks within Australia. The first of the attacks occurred on 20 October 2024, when an organized crime-linked group of arsonists led by Australian Sayid Moosawi, a known associate and former president of the Nomads MC Parramatta chapter, conducted an attack on Lewis Continental Kitchen, a kosher restaurant in Sydney. The second attack took place on 6 December 2024, when another group of Australian arsonists firebombed the Adass Israel Synagogue in Melbourne, injuring one congregation member and causing property damage in excess of A$20 million. Australian Security Intelligence Organisation (ASIO) director Mike Burgess said he believes Iran was also responsible for more antisemitic attacks in the country.

On 26 August 2025, Prime Minister Anthony Albanese said that the IRGC was responsible for the attacks. In the press conference, Albanese said he had expelled the Iranian ambassador and closed operations at the Australian embassy in Tehran. It marked the first time Australia had expelled an ambassador since World War II.

Iran is also alleged to have directed a January 2025 attack on a childcare centre in Sydney that resulted in extensive property damage.

== Attacks ==
=== Lewis Continental Kitchen – Sydney ===
On 20 October 2024, the Lewis Continental Kitchen, a Jewish kosher restaurant in the Sydney suburb of Bondi, was set on fire. An individual was charged with allegedly directing four men to set fire to the restaurant. For this attack, the accused allegedly received A$12,000. The accused denied any involvement with the Iranian government. A second individual was charged with allegedly starting the fire. No people were injured in this attack, however it resulted in approximately A$1 million in property damages.

=== Adass Israel Synagogue – Melbourne ===
In the early morning on 6 December 2024, a group of three arsonists firebombed the Adass Israel Synagogue in the Melbourne suburb of Ripponlea. The attack destroyed sacred texts and caused property damage in excess of A$20 million. One member of the synagogue, who left to call police, sustained minor injuries to his hands after returning to the synagogue. The Australian government will provide up to A$30 million over three years to rebuild the synagogue. It is estimated that it will cost between A$25 million and A$40 million to rebuild. Three individuals were charged with allegedly starting the fire.

== Investigation ==
=== Arrests ===
Nine people were arrested in connection with the Sydney attack on the Lewis Continental Kitchen and were not charged with terrorism offences.

Four people were arrested in connection with the Melbourne attack on the Adass Israel Synagogue and were not charged with terrorism offences.

=== Allegations by the Australian government ===
On 26 August 2025, Prime Minister Anthony Albanese held a joint press conference with Foreign Minister Penny Wong, ASIO director Mike Burgess, and Home Affairs Minister Tony Burke. In this press conference, Albanese said ASIO had gathered enough 'credible intelligence' to link Iran to both the Lewis Continental Kitchen and Adass Israel Synagogue attacks, as well as likely further attacks. The government expelled the Iranian ambassador, ceased operations at the Embassy of Australia in Iran, and moved all consular staff to another country. He also announced that Australia would list the IRGC as a terrorist organisation, pending enabling legislation.

It was later reported that the Albanese government was aware of the Iranian involvement for months prior to the announcement.

In October 2025, the Israeli intelligence agency Mossad accused the leader of the Quds Force of the IRGC of orchestrating numerous foiled terror attacks in several countries, including Australia.

On 27 November 2025, the government listed the IRGC as a "state sponsor of terrorism" under the Criminal Code Amendment (State Sponsors of Terrorism) Act 2025.

On 24 June 2026, ASIO director Mike Burgess said that an Australian citizen living in Iran allegedly organised the arson attack on the Lewis Continental Kitchen and that a former Australian resident living in Iraq allegedly organised the arson attack on the Adass Israel synagogue.

== International reactions ==
Iran – Foreign Minister Abbas Araghchi denied that his government of having any involvement in the attacks while labelling Albanese as a "weak politician".

Israel – The government supported Australia expelling the ambassador and claimed credit for pressuring Albanese into the expulsion. This was later refuted by Tony Burke, who stated it was solely his government's decision and called the claims that it was due to Israeli pressure "complete nonsense".

== See also ==
- Australia–Iran relations
- Assassination and terrorism in Iran
- History of Jews in Iran
- Organisations listed as terrorist organisations under Australia's Criminal Code
