= List of high commissioners of Australia to Papua New Guinea =

High Commissioner of Australia to Papua New Guinea

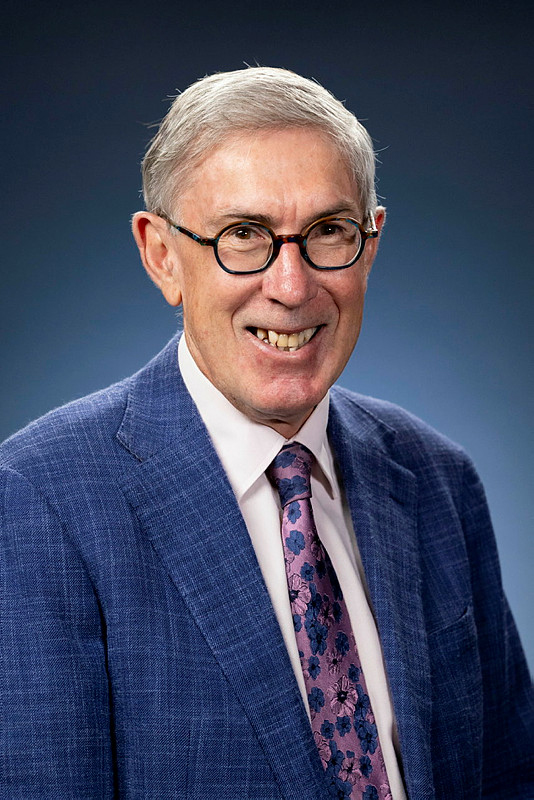
- Incumbent; Ewen McDonald since 25 February 2025
- Department of Foreign Affairs and Trade
- Style: His Excellency
- Reports to: Minister for Foreign Affairs
- Residence: Waigani, Port Moresby
- Nominator: Prime Minister of Australia
- Appointer: Governor General of Australia
- Inaugural holder: Les Johnson (as High Commissioner for the Territory of Papua and New Guinea)
- Formation: 1 December 1973
- Website: Australian High Commission, Papua New Guinea

The high commissioner of Australia to Papua New Guinea is an officer of the Australian Department of Foreign Affairs and Trade and the head of the high commission of the Commonwealth of Australia in Papua New Guinea. The high commissioner resides in Port Moresby and, since February 2020, has been Jon Philp. The high commission's work has been assisted since 6 February 2017 by a consulate-general in Lae.

== Posting history ==
The Australian Government has offered diplomatic representation in Papua New Guinea since the establishment of self-government for the Territory of Papua and New Guinea in December 1973. The Australian Government administrator in Papua New Guinea was retitled as high commissioner, which was continued as a solely diplomatic post once PNG gained independence from 16 September 1975.

=== Lae consulate ===
On 18 April 1975, a consular office was opened in the city of Lae, which was later upgraded to a consulate-general from 16 September 1975 upon independence. However, due to resource constraints in foreign affairs with the new Liberal/National government of Malcolm Fraser, the post was scaled down from late 1978, with the responsibilities of the consulate passed to the deputy high commissioner in Port Moresby, Max Hughes, and was completely closed down in December 1981. The post remained closed until the appointment and opening of an Honorary Consulate on 24 July 1989, which lasted until the reopening of the Consulate-General in February 2017 as part of a significant expansion of Australia's global diplomatic presence.

== Heads of mission ==
#	Officeholder	Title	Term start date	Term end date	Time in office	Notes
1	Les Johnson	High Commissioner for Papua New Guinea	1 December 1973	29 March 1974	118 days	
2	Tom Critchley	High Commissioner for Papua New Guinea	29 March 1974	16 September 1975	3 years, 10 months	
2	Tom Critchley	High Commissioner to Papua New Guinea	16 September 1975	February 1978	3 years, 10 months	
3	Gerry Nutter	High Commissioner to Papua New Guinea	February 1978	May 1981	3 years, 3 months	
4	Robert Birch	High Commissioner to Papua New Guinea	May 1981	September 1984	3 years, 4 months	
5	Michael Wilson	High Commissioner to Papua New Guinea	September 1984	October 1987	3 years, 1 month	
6	Lance Joseph	High Commissioner to Papua New Guinea	October 1987	April 1989	1 year, 6 months	
7	Allan Taylor	High Commissioner to Papua New Guinea	April 1989	March 1993	3 years, 11 months	
8	Bill Farmer	High Commissioner to Papua New Guinea	March 1993	March 1996	3 years	
9	David Irvine	High Commissioner to Papua New Guinea	March 1996	September 1999	3 years, 6 months	
10	Nick Warner	High Commissioner to Papua New Guinea	September 1999	March 2003	3 years, 6 months	
11	Michael Potts	High Commissioner to Papua New Guinea	March 2003	December 2006	3 years, 9 months	
12	Chris Moraitis	High Commissioner to Papua New Guinea	December 2006	February 2010	3 years, 2 months	
13	Ian Kemish	High Commissioner to Papua New Guinea	February 2010	March 2013	3 years, 1 month	
14	Deborah Stokes	High Commissioner to Papua New Guinea	March 2013	August 2015	2 years, 5 months	
−	Bronte Moules (Acting)	High Commissioner to Papua New Guinea	August 2015	December 2015	4 months	
15	Bruce Davis	High Commissioner to Papua New Guinea	2 December 2015	25 February 2020	4 years, 85 days	
16	Jon Philp	High Commissioner to Papua New Guinea	25 February 2020	Incumbent	6 years, 194 days	

=== Consuls-general in Lae ===
Name	Start of term	End of term	References
Noel Ross Smith	November 1974	25 October 1976	
Eric Herbert Hanfield	25 October 1976	1978	
Max Hughes (resident in Port Moresby)	1978	December 1981	
Posting closed
Kevin Beamish (Honorary Consul)	24 July 1989	12 September 1994	
Phil Franklin (Honorary Consul)	12 September 1994	August 2013	
Alan McLay (Honorary Consul)	August 2013	16 December 2016	
Paul Murphy	16 December 2016	16 December 2020	
Mark Foxe	16 December 2020	present	

== See also ==
- Australia–Papua New Guinea relations
- Foreign relations of Australia
- Foreign relations of Papua New Guinea
