= Jon Philp =

Australian diplomat and career officer

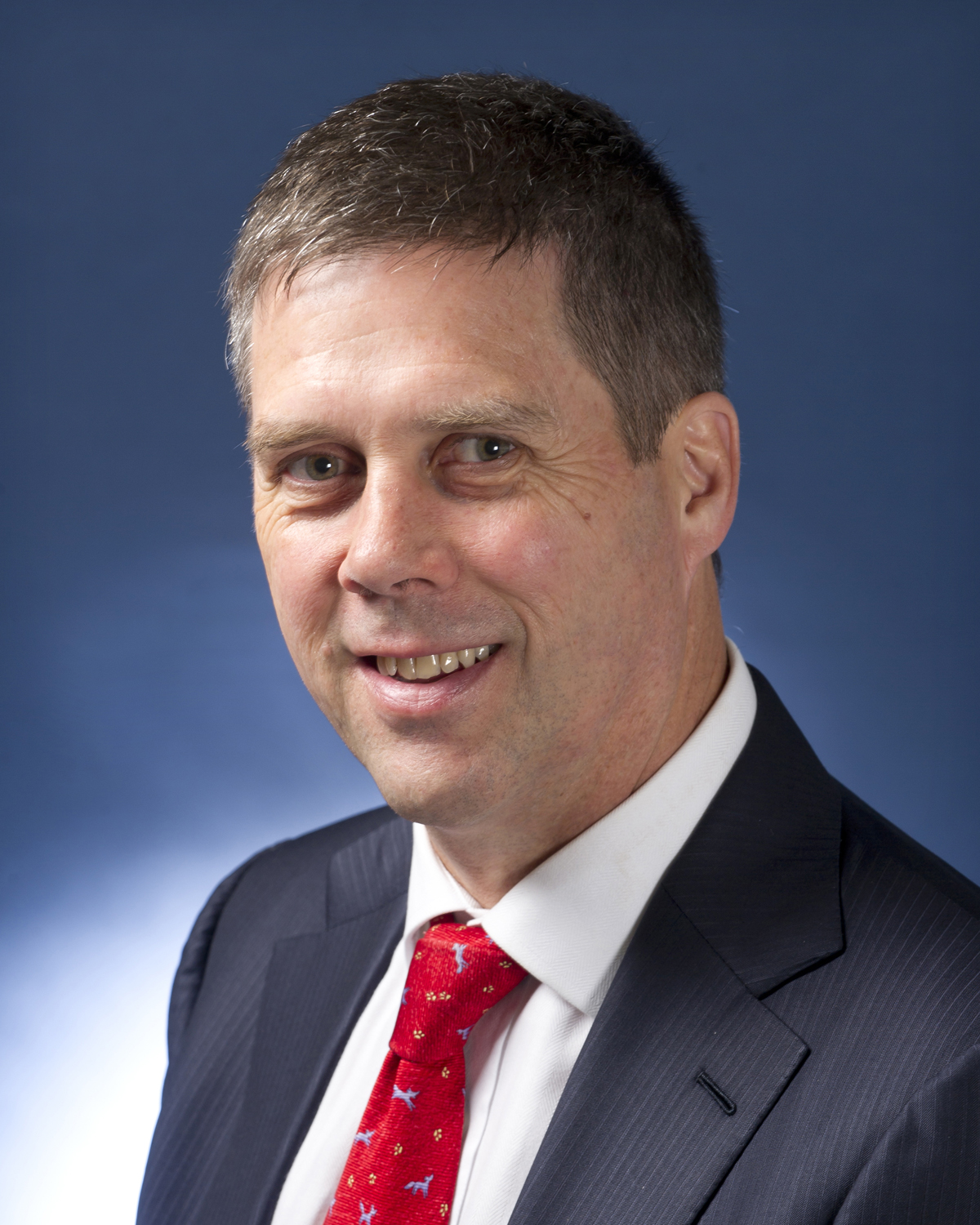
- Jon Philp in 2012

Australian High Commissioner to Papua New Guinea
- Incumbent
- Assumed office 25 February 2020
- Monarchs: Elizabeth II; Charles III
- Prime Minister: Scott Morrison; Anthony Albanese
- Preceded by: Bruce Davis

Australian Ambassador to Afghanistan
- In office 2012–2015
- Monarch: Elizabeth II
- Prime Minister: Julia Gillard (2012–13); Kevin Rudd (2013); Tony Abbott (2013–15)
- Preceded by: Paul Foley
- Succeeded by: Matthew Anderson

Australian Ambassador to Turkey
- In office 2001–2004
- Monarch: Elizabeth II
- Prime Minister: John Howard
- Preceded by: Ian Forsyth
- Succeeded by: Matthew Anderson

Personal details
- Born: 1960 (age 65–66) Bangkok, Thailand
- Education: Australian National University

Jonathan Philp (born 1960) is an Australian diplomat and career officer with the Department of Foreign Affairs and Trade.

== Career ==
Philp was appointed as Australian ambassador to Afghanistan on 9 August 2012. He presented his credentials to Afghan President Hamid Karzai on 31 January 2013. Prior to his ambassadorial appointment, Philp was the Assistant Secretary, International Organisations Branch and Assistant Secretary, Consular Operations Branch. He previously served overseas as Ambassador to Turkey; Deputy Head of Mission, Myanmar, and has had postings to Saudi Arabia, Vientiane, London, Nairobi and Madrid.

Philp holds a Bachelor of Arts (Honours) from the Australian National University. He speaks Arabic and French.

== Postings ==
- 1986–1988 – Third Secretary, Australian Embassy in Riyadh
- 1992–1995 – Deputy Head of Mission, Australian Embassy in Yangon
- 1996–1998 – Director, Southeast Asian Issues
- 1999 – Assistant Secretary, Diplomatic Security Branch
- 2001–2004 – Ambassador, Australian Embassy in Ankara
- 2004–2007 – Head of International Relations, Woodside Petroleum
- 2008–2009 – Somalia Taskforce, Nairobi
- 2009–2011 – Assistant Secretary, Consular Operations Branch
- 2012 – Assistant Secretary, International Organisations Branch
- 2013–2015 – Ambassador, Australian Embassy in Kabul
- 2015–2017 – First Assistant Secretary, Consular and Crisis Management Division
- 2018–2020 – Head of Mission/Chargé d' Affaires, Australian Embassy in Athens (accredited to Greece, Bulgaria, Romania)
- 2020–present – High Commissioner to Papua New Guinea

Diplomatic posts
Preceded by Ian Forsyth	Australian Ambassador to Turkey; 2001–2004	Succeeded by Jean Dunn
Preceded by Paul Foley	Australian Ambassador to Afghanistan; 2012–2015	Succeeded by Matthew Anderson
Preceded by Bruce Davis	Australian High Commissioner to Papua New Guinea; 2020–present	Incumbent
