= Nick Parkinson =

Australian public servant (1925–2001)

Sir Nick Parkinson
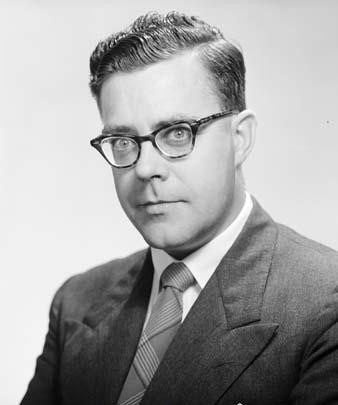

Secretary of the Department of Foreign Affairs
- In office 18 February 1977 – 4 September 1979

14th Ambassador of Australia to the United States
- In office 13 November 1979 – 15 July 1982
- Preceded by: Robert B. Birch (Chargé d'affaires)
- Succeeded by: Geoffrey J. Price (Chargé d'affaires)

11th Ambassador of Australia to the United States
- Preceded by: Gordon Noel Upton (Chargé d'affaires)
- Succeeded by: Alan Renouf

Personal details
- Born: Nicholas Fancourt Parkinson; 5 December 1925 England
- Died: 12 September 2001 (aged 75) Canberra
- Spouse: Roslyn (née Campbell) (m. 1952)
- Children: Sheena and Joanna
- Education: University of Sydney
- Occupation: Public servant

Sir Nicholas Fancourt Parkinson (5 December 1925 – 12 September 2001) was a senior Australian public servant. He was Secretary of the Department of Foreign Affairs between February 1977 and September 1979.

== Early life ==
Nick Parkinson was born in England on 5 December 1925, migrating to Australia with his family when his father was appointed headmaster of King's School Parramatta. Parkinson attended Tudor House School, Moss Vale, NSW for four years before progressing to The King's School, Parramatta for high school.

== Career ==
Parkinson joined the Department of External Affairs as a cadet in 1951.

Rising up the ranks, he was appointed a Deputy Secretary of the Department of Foreign Affairs in 1974. He was named Australian Ambassador to the United States in 1976. Before departing on the post, he said that it was "enormously important" to keep in touch with American thinking on the Soviet Union, the Strategic Arms Limitation Talks, China and Japan.

Parkinson returned from Washington to become the Secretary of the Department in 1977. Whilst head of the department, he suffered severe eyestrain. In 1979, he left his Secretary role to return to the United States as Australian Ambassador once again.

== Awards ==
Parkinson was made a Knight Bachelor in 1979.

Government offices
Preceded by Alan Renouf	Secretary of the Department of Foreign Affairs; 1977 – 1979	Succeeded by Peter Henderson
Diplomatic posts
Preceded by Gordon Upton as Charge d'Affaires	Australian Ambassador to the United States; 1976	Succeeded by Alan Renouf
Preceded by Alan Renouf	Australian Ambassador to the United States; 1979 – 1982	Succeeded by Bob Cotton
