= Jenny Bloomfield =

Australian diplomat

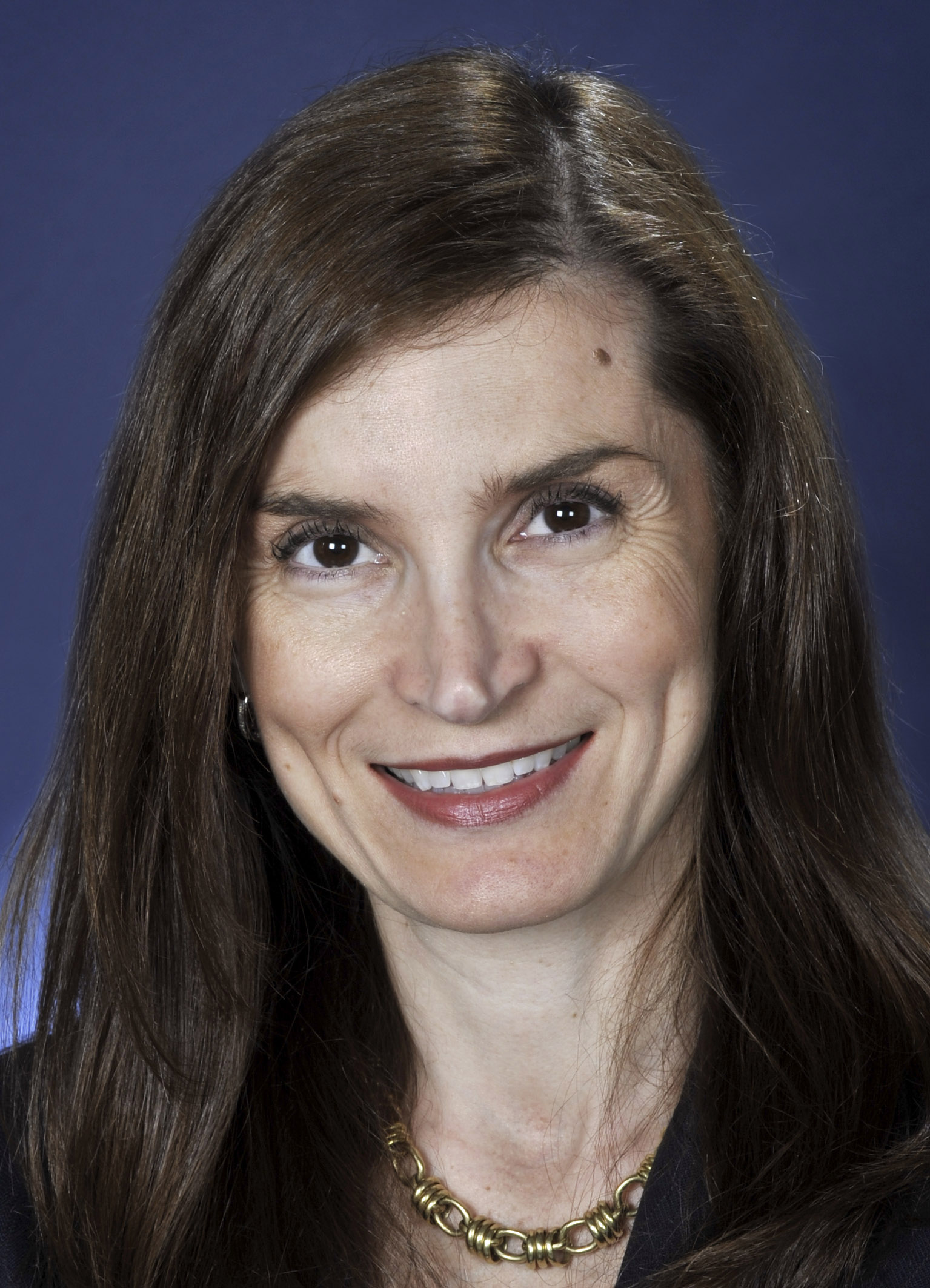
Bloomfield in 2011

Jenny Bloomfield is an Australian former diplomat who served as the Australian representative to Taiwan from 1 February 2021 to July 2023. She was previously the Australian ambassador to Greece, with non-resident accreditation to Albania and Bulgaria, from 2011 to 2014.

== Early life and education ==
Bloomfield earned a Master of Arts in Foreign Affairs and Trade from Monash University, a Bachelor of Letters in Political Science and French and a Bachelor of Laws/Bachelor of Arts in Modern Greek from the University of Melbourne.

== Personal life ==
Bloomfield has four children. She speaks eight languages, including Mandarin Chinese and Taiwanese Hokkien.
