= List of ambassadors of Australia to the Philippines =

Ambassador of Australia to the Philippines

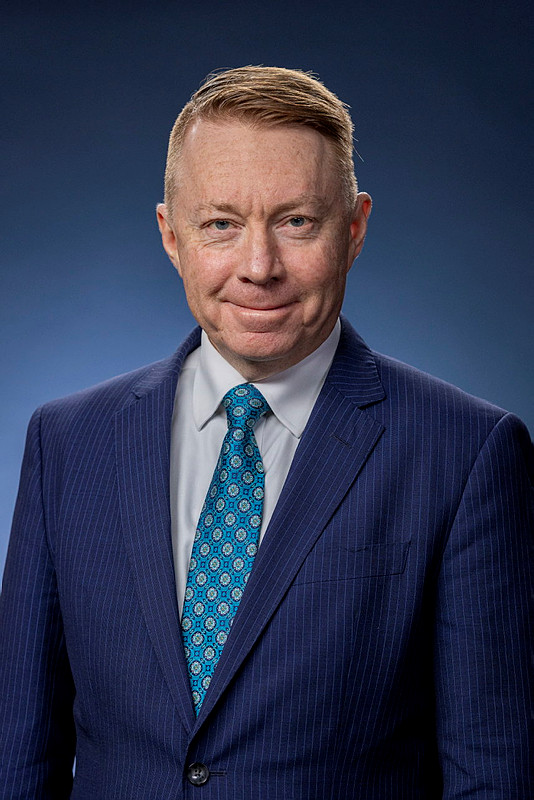
- Incumbent; Marc Innes-Brown since 19 August 2025
- Department of Foreign Affairs and Trade
- Style: His Excellency
- Reports to: Minister for Foreign Affairs
- Residence: Manila
- Nominator: Prime Minister of Australia
- Appointer: Governor General of Australia
- Term length: No fixed term
- Inaugural holder: Herbert Peterson (as Consul-General)
- Formation: 4 July 1946
- Website: Australian Embassy, Manila

The Ambassador of Australia to the Philippines is an officer of the Australian Department of Foreign Affairs and Trade and the head of the Embassy of the Commonwealth of Australia to the Republic of the Philippines. The Ambassador resides in Manila. The current ambassador, since August 2025, is Marc Innes-Brown.

== List of heads of mission ==
Ordinal	Officeholder	Title	Term start date	Term end date	Time in office	Notes
(n/a)	Herbert Peterson	Consul-General	1946	1948	1–2 years	
(n/a)	Keith Waller	Consul-General	1948	1950	1–2 years	
1	George Dunbar Moore	Minister to the Philippines	1950	1955	4–5 years	
2	Mick Shann	Minister to the Philippines	1955	1957	1–2 years	
3	Mick Shann	Ambassador of Australia to the Philippines	1957	1959	1–2 years	
4	Alfred Stirling	Ambassador of Australia to the Philippines	1959	1963	3–4 years	
5	Bill Cutts	Ambassador of Australia to the Philippines	1963	1966	2–3 years	
6	Francis Hamilton Stuart	Ambassador of Australia to the Philippines	1966	1970	3–4 years	
7	James Ingram	Ambassador of Australia to the Philippines	1970	1973	2–3 years	
8	Peter Henderson	Ambassador of Australia to the Philippines	1973	1975	1–2 years	
9	Gerry Nutter	Ambassador of Australia to the Philippines	1975	1978	2–3 years	
10	Richard Woolcott	Ambassador of Australia to the Philippines	1978	1982	3–4 years	
11	Roy Fernandez	Ambassador of Australia to the Philippines	1982	1986	3–4 years	
12	John Holloway	Ambassador of Australia to the Philippines	1986	1989	2–3 years	
13	Mack Williams	Ambassador of Australia to the Philippines	1989	1994	4–5 years	
14	Richard Smith	Ambassador of Australia to the Philippines	1994	1996	1–2 years	
15	Miles Kupa	Ambassador of Australia to the Philippines	1996	1999	2–3 years	
16	John Buckley	Ambassador of Australia to the Philippines	1999	2002	2–3 years	
17	Ruth Pearce	Ambassador of Australia to the Philippines	2002	2005	2–3 years	
18	Tony Hely	Ambassador of Australia to the Philippines	2005	2008	2–3 years	
19	Rod Smith	Ambassador of Australia to the Philippines	2008	2012	3–4 years	
20	Bill Tweddell	Ambassador of Australia to the Philippines	2012	2016	3–4 years	
21	Amanda Gorely	Ambassador of Australia to the Philippines	2016	2018	1–2 years	
22	Steven J. Robinson	Ambassador of Australia to the Philippines	January 2019	2022	2–3 years	
23	Hae Kyong Yu	Ambassador of Australia to the Philippines	6 July 2022	25 July 2025	2–3 years	
24	Marc Innes-Brown	Ambassador of Australia to the Philippines	19 August 2025	Incumbent	384 days	
