= Les Johnson (diplomat) =

Australian public servant and diplomat (1916–2000)

Sir Les Johnson KBE

Australian Ambassador to Greece Australian High Commissioner to Cyprus
- In office June 1976 – June 1980
- Preceded by: Donald Horne
- Succeeded by: Marshall Johnston

Australian High Commissioner to Papua New Guinea
- In office 1 December 1973 – March 1974
- Preceded by: Himself
- Succeeded by: Tom Critchley

Administrator of Papua and New Guinea
- In office 1970 – 1 December 1973
- Monarch: Elizabeth II
- Prime Minister: John Gorton; William McMahon; Gough Whitlam
- Preceded by: David Hay
- Succeeded by: Himself

Personal details
- Born: 2 April 1916 Tambellup, Western Australia
- Died: 31 August 2000 (aged 84) Sydney, New South Wales
- Spouse: Dulcie (m. 1940; died 1999)

Military service
- Allegiance: Australia
- Branch/service: Second Australian Imperial Force
- Years of service: 1942–1946
- Rank: Sergeant
- Battles/wars: Second World War

Sir Leslie Wilson Johnson, KBE (2 April 1916 – 31 August 2000) was an Australian public servant and diplomat.

== Career ==
Johnson first went to Papua New Guinea in 1962. From 1966 to 1969, he was Assistant Administrator in Papua and New Guinea. He resigned in 1969 after internal differences with colleagues, before being appointed Administrator of Papua New Guinea in 1970. His task was to develop a colonial Administrator's council into a cabinet in preparation for Papua New Guinea's independence.

On 1 December 1973, after 60 years of Papua New Guinea being a territory of Australia, Johnson's role changed from the Administrator of Papua New Guinea to the Australian High Commissioner to Papua New Guinea. Johnson left Papua New Guinea in March 1974, to take up a post as the head of the new Australian Development Assistance Agency. The agency was set up in recognition of the need for stronger policy direction and coordination, along with Papua New Guinea achieving independence. In the mid-1970s, two-thirds of Australian total overseas aid was sent to Papua New Guinea.

From June 1976 to 1980, Johnson was Australian Ambassador to Greece and the non-resident High Commissioner to Cyprus.

In the 1976 Queen's Birthday Honours, Johnson was made a Commander of the Order of the British Empire in recognition of his distinguished services to Papua New Guinea. In the Papua New Guinea 2000 Queen's Birthday Honours he was made a Knight Commander of the Order of the British Empire.

Johnson died on 31 August 2000.

Diplomatic posts
Preceded by David Hay	Administrator of Papua and New Guinea; 1970–1973	Succeeded by Himself as Ambassador
Preceded by Himself as Administrator	Australian High Commissioner to Papua New Guinea; 1973–1974	Succeeded by Tom Critchley
Preceded by Donald Horne	Australian Ambassador to Greece; Australian High Commissioner to Cyprus; 1976–1980	Succeeded by Marshall Johnston
