= Barry Hall (diplomat) =

Australian public servant and diplomat

- Born: Francis Barrington Hall; 12 February 1921; Panton Hill, Victoria
- Died: 14 November 2013 (aged 92)
- Occupations: Public servant, diplomat

Francis Barrington "Barry" Hall (12 February 1921 – 14 November 2013) was an Australian public servant and diplomat.

Hall was the first Australian Ambassador to Iran when the Australian Government opened an embassy in Tehran in September 1968.

Between 1980 and 1984, Hall was Australian Ambassador to Turkey.

Diplomatic posts
| New title Position established | Australian Ambassador to Iran; 1968–1972 | Succeeded by Henry Douglas White |
| Preceded by Hugh Gilchrist | Australian Ambassador to Greece; 1972–1974 | Succeeded by Donald Horne |
| Preceded by Roy Peachey | Australian Ambassador to Turkey; 1980–1984 | Succeeded by Philip Peters |
