= Australia–Papua New Guinea relations =

- Australia: Papua New Guinea

Diplomatic mission
- High Commission of Australia to Port Moresby: High Commission of Papua New Guinea to Canberra

Envoy
- High Commissioner Ewen McDonald: High Commissioner John Kali

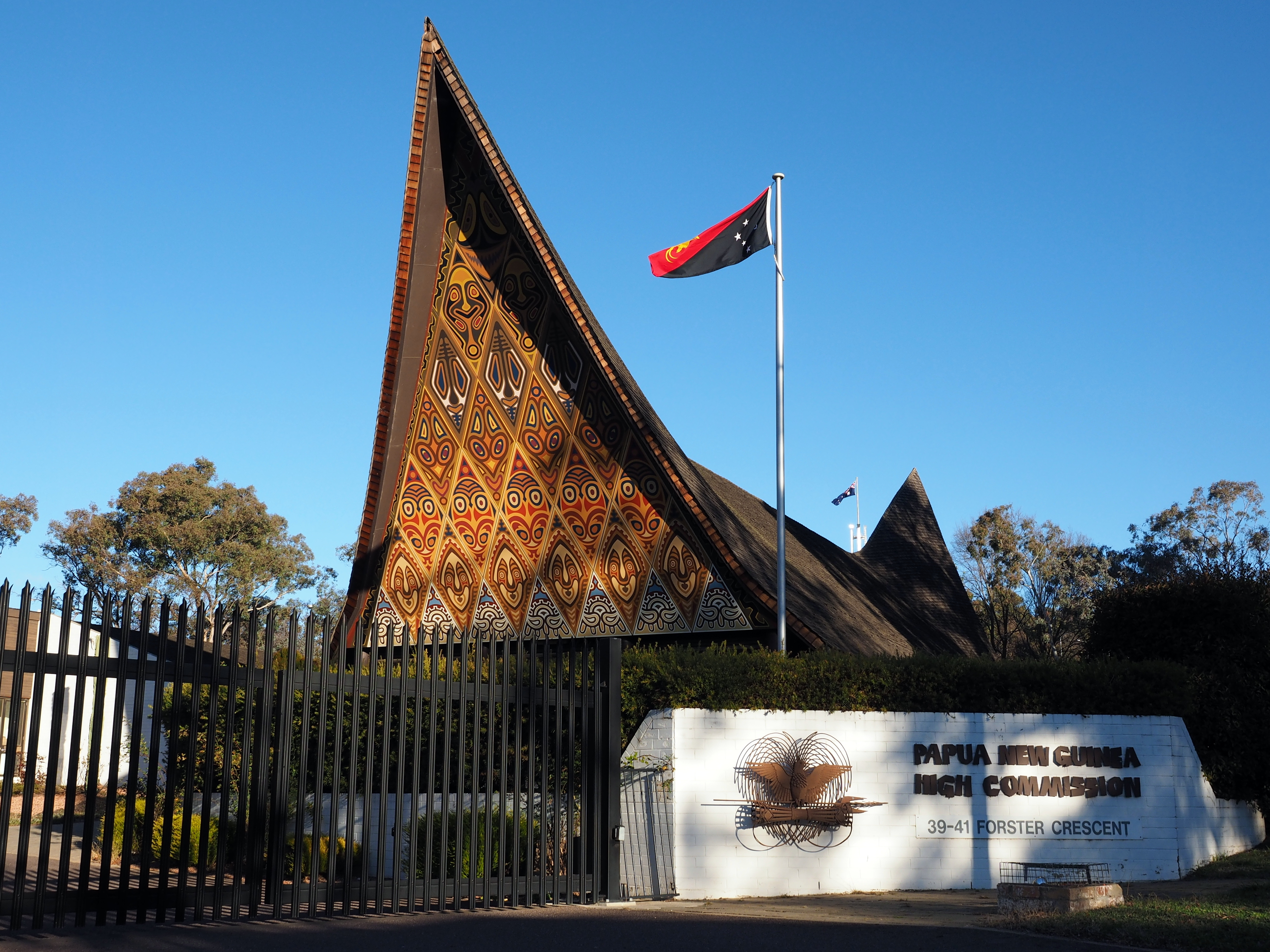
Papua New Guinea high commission in Canberra, Australia.

Papua New Guinea is Australia's closest neighbour (roughly 3.75 km separates the two countries at Saibai Island in the Torres Strait) and a former territory of Australia. Papua New Guinea has developed much closer relations with Australia than with Indonesia, the only country which it shares a land border with. The two countries are Commonwealth realms. In contemporary times, Papua New Guinea is one of the largest recipients of Australian aid. Some critics have pointed to instances where this has led to an outsized Australian influence on Papua New Guinea politics.

== History ==
=== Early relations ===
The southern half of eastern New Guinea (the Territory of Papua) was annexed by the Colony of Queensland in 1883, on behalf of the British Empire. This annexation however, would not be ratified by the United Kingdom, and the land was placed as a protectorate. After federation, the land would soon come under Australian administration in 1902, following a formal annexation by the United Kingdom. In 1920, Australia was given a League of Nations mandate to rule former German New Guinea, and in 1946, this was reconstituted as a United Nations Trust Territory. In 1949, the external territory of Papua and UN trust territory of New Guinea were combined in a partial Political union. The Papua and New Guinea territories consisted of more than 800 different tribes.

=== Papua New Guinean independence ===
Papua New Guinea remained an external territory and Un Trust Territory in union under the sovereignty of Australia up until 1975, where under Prime Minister Gough Whitlam, parliament passed the Papua New Guinea Independence Act 1975, withdrawing Australian power over the territory. Papua New Guinea became an independent Commonwealth nation on 16 September 1975. The two countries retained close relations, with Australia supplying development aid. Papua New Guinea's political institutions are modelled on the Westminster system, the same system that is used by Australia.

In February 1977, Australia and Papua New Guinea signed the "Agreement on Trade and Commercial Relations between the Government of Australia and the Government of Papua New Guinea (PATCRA)", establishing a free trade area between the two nations.

In 1987, the two nations signed the Joint Declaration of Principles Guiding Relations Between Australia and Papua New Guinea.

In September 1991, Australia and Papua New Guinea signed the "Agreement on Trade and Commercial Relations between the Government of Australia and the Government of Papua New Guinea (PATCRA II)", expanding upon the previous agreement from 1977.

Monthly value of Australian merchandise exports to Papua New Guinea (A$ millions) since 1988

Monthly value of Papua New Guinean merchandise exports to Australia (A$ millions) since 1988

In 2001, a detention centre was built on Manus Island, in Papua New Guinea, as part of Australia's "Pacific Solution". Refugee claimants seeking asylum in Australia were sent to Manus Island (or Nauru). Australia paid for the costs of their detention, providing Papua New Guinea with economic aid. The last inmate was Aladdin Sisalem, who was kept in solitary confinement from July 2003 until he was finally granted asylum in Australia in June 2004. Australia continued to pay for the upkeep of the empty detention centre until late 2007.

Relations between Prime Minister Sir Michael Somare (PNG) and Prime Minister John Howard (Australia) were often strained. In March 2005, Somare was required by security officers at Brisbane Airport, Australia, to remove his shoes during a routine departure security check. He took strong exception to what he considered a humiliation, leading to a diplomatic contretemps and a significant cooling of relations between the two countries. A protest march in Port Moresby saw hundreds march on the Australian High Commission, demanding an apology.

In 2006, tensions between Papua New Guinea and Australia worsened due to the Moti affair. Julian Moti, a close associate of Manasseh Sogavare, the then Prime Minister of the Solomon Islands, was arrested in Port Moresby on 29 September 2006 under an Australian extradition request to face child sex charges in relation to events in Vanuatu in 1997. After breaking bail conditions and taking sanctuary in the Solomon Islands High Commission, he was flown to the Solomon Islands on a clandestine PNG Defence Force flight on the night of 10 October, causing outrage on the part of the Australian government. Australia then cancelled ministerial-level talks in December and banned senior Papua New Guinea ministers from entering Australia, including Somare.

In 2007, both prime ministers faced elections. Somare was re-elected, but Howard was defeated and succeeded by Kevin Rudd. Rudd soon set out to mend Australian-PNG relations. He met his Papua New Guinean counterpart in Bali in December 2007 to resume normal diplomatic relations. Rudd agreed with Somare to shift the focus of relations to economic ties. In March 2008, Rudd visited Papua New Guinea.

In 2013, under Prime Ministers Julia Gillard (Australia) and Peter O'Neill (PNG), the two nations signed the Joint Declaration for a New Papua New Guinea-Australia Partnership. This was an evolution of the previous agreement, the 1987 Joint Declaration of Principles Guiding Relations Between Australia and Papua New Guinea.

Australia provided funding for the restoration of four bridges in Oro Province that had been destroyed by Cyclone Guba.

It was reported in November 2019 that Australia would directly loan Papua New Guinea $US300 million, via Export Finance Australia.

In August 2020, Prime Ministers Scott Morrison (Australia) and James Marape (PNG) signed the Papua New Guinea-Australia Comprehensive Strategic and Economic Partnership, to expand further upon the ties existing between the two nations. Upon announcing that Australia would support Papua New Guinea's efforts in the COVID-19 pandemic, then-Prime Minister Morrison described the nation as "family". Morrison stated that the public health assistance was "in Australia's interests", adding it was "equally [to] our PNG family who are so dear to us".

In 2023, prime ministers Anthony Albanese (Australia) and James Marape (PNG) signed a security agreement, with Marape touting the deal as showing the two are "brother and sister nations". Albanese added that "For our interests going forward, we have no closer friends than Papua New Guinea". Papua New Guinean forces participated in the Australian-based Exercise Talisman Sabre for the first time, while offering to host part of the 2025 edition, which would mark the first time the exercise would take place outside of Australia.

In December 2024, PNG reached an agreement to join Australia's National Rugby League (NRL), securing a landmark deal worth A$600 million over ten years to establish a team in Port Moresby by 2028. In return, PNG committed to prioritising Australia as its primary security partner and refraining from forming security ties with China. This agreement, while shrouded in confidentiality, stipulated that Australia could withdraw funding and the NRL team if PNG entered a security pact with any nation outside the "Pacific family", excluding China. The agreement also highlighted Australia's increasing influence in the Pacific, countering China's growing presence in the region, while raising questions about PNG's sovereignty and its future security partnerships. The Australian offer to fund an NRL team supposedly contributed to Papua New Guinea rejecting a security agreement with China, and the funding of the team is predicated on Papua New Guinea not entering security arrangements with countries outside the "Pacific family" (which excludes China).

=== Pukpuk Treaty ===
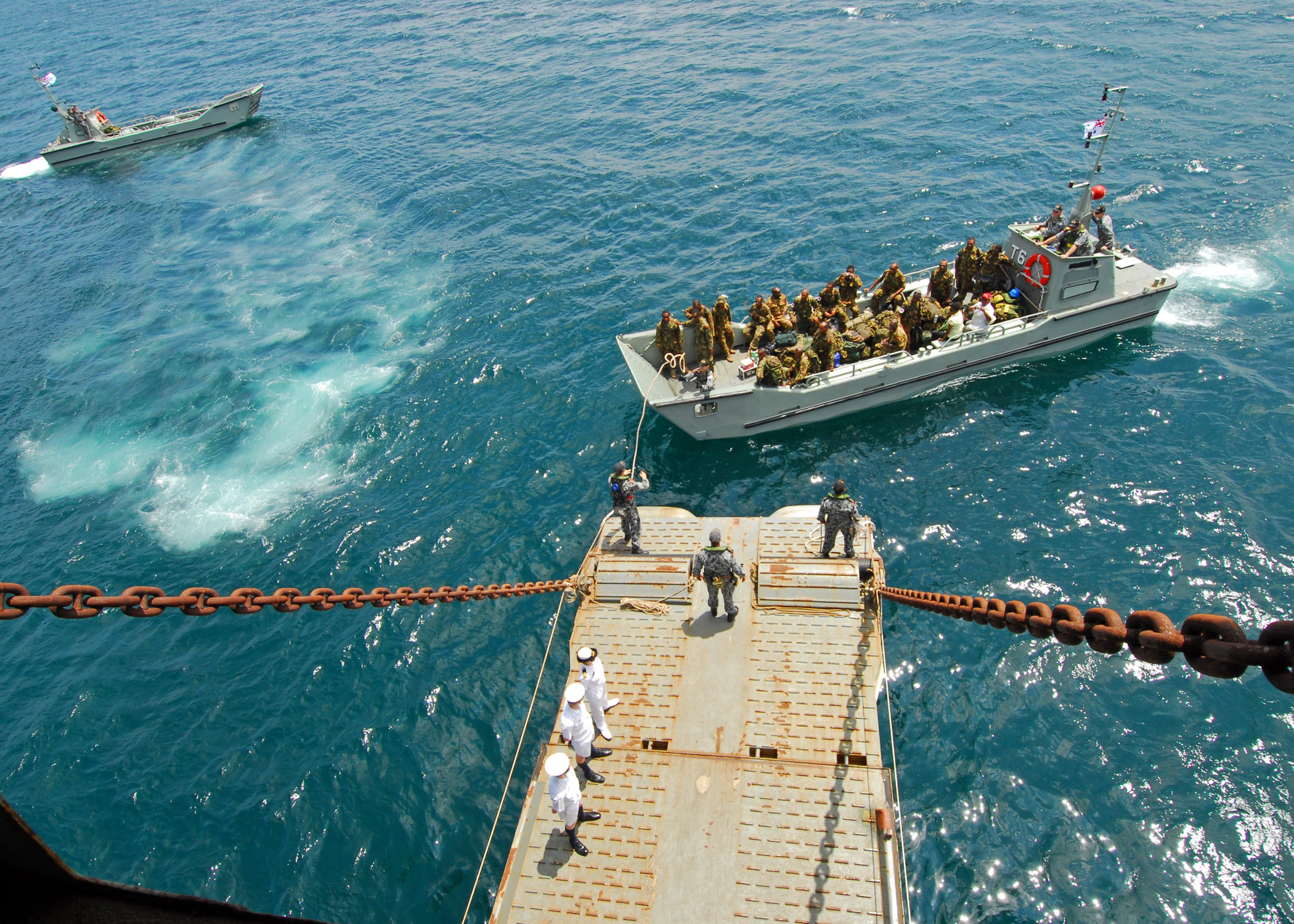
Members of the Papua New Guinea Defence Force embark on a Royal Australian Navy ship during a training exercise in 2010.

In February 2025, Australia and Papua New Guinea announced talks on a full defence treaty, which would be deeper than the 2023 agreement. Both countries already had a defence cooperation deal, and the goal of the full defence was to enhance military cooperation and interoperability, as per Australia's Defence Minister Richard Marles. The treaty planned to deepen integration between the two nations' defence forces. Papua New Guinea Defence Minister Billy Joseph stressed close ties with Australia, calling them "tied to the hips". While discussions were being undertaken, military cooperation deepened with the completion of an Australian-funded expansion of Papua New Guinea's Lombrum Naval Base. This expansion, which Australian Minister for Defence Richard Marles called the "biggest infrastructure project that Australia has ever undertaken in the Pacific", was undertaken in the expectation that the base would be able to be used by Australian ships as well as those of Papua New Guinea.

A deal was reached in September 2025, under which both country's militaries would become fully integrated, with Joseph stating "We're not talking about interoperability, we're talking about totally integrated forces". Joseph also compared the resulting alliance to that of Article 4 of the North Atlantic Treaty. Citizens of both countries can be hired by either military, and serving in the Australian military would provide a path to Australian citizenship. Australian forces will have full access to certain sites in Papua New Guinea, and both countries will be legally obligated to assist the other in the case of attack. The treaty has been officially designated the Pukpuk Treaty (meaning "Crocodile Treaty"). A submission to the Papua New Guinean cabinet stated "[The treaty] has the ability to bite and like a crocodile, its bite force speaks of the interoperability's and preparedness of the military for war."

The timing of the deal meant it was planned to come into force the day before the 50th anniversary of Papua New Guinea's independence from Australia. Its strengthening of the security relationship was seen as part of a continued response to Papua New Guinea's relationship with China, as well as China's growing influence in the wider region. The ability for foreign citizens to serve in the Australian military was previously extended only to other members of the Five Eyes group. The pact was expected to be signed on 17 September, the day after the independence celebrations in Papua New Guinea which will be attended by Australian Prime Minister Anthony Albanese. Albanese stated that the deal means that Papua New Guinea will be a defence partner on the same level as the United States.

On 17 September 2025, the leaders of Australia and Papua New Guinea signed a defence communique. Albanese stated that the Papua New Guinea cabinet meeting did not achieve a quorum. Papua New Guinean Prime Minister James Marape stated that the delay was unrelated to China, and that Joseph would travel to countries such as China and Indonesia to explain the pact. The Papua New Guinea cabinet subsequently approved the treaty on 2 October. Papua New Guinean Prime Minister James Marape and Australian Prime Minister Anthony Albanese signed the treaty in Canberra on 6 October 2025.

In mid-October 2025, the Indonesian government urged Australia and Papua New Guinea to respect its sovereignty and independence following the signing of the Pukpuk Treaty.

== Polls ==
In a 1997 poll of students at the University of Papua New Guinea, nearly three-quarters of respondents had favourable feelings about Australia, with Australians being seen by respondents as friendly and hard-working with a love of sport.

In a 2022 poll by Australian research group the Lowy Institute, 61% of respondents had a favourable view of Papua New Guinea. The only other countries from Oceania included in the poll were Tonga, which had a 67% rating, and New Zealand, which was the most favorably viewed country by Australians with an 86% rating.

== See also ==
- Colonialism
- Commonwealth of Nations
- Politics of Australia
- Politics of Papua New Guinea
- Torres Strait Treaty
