= Jean Dunn (diplomat) =

Australian diplomat

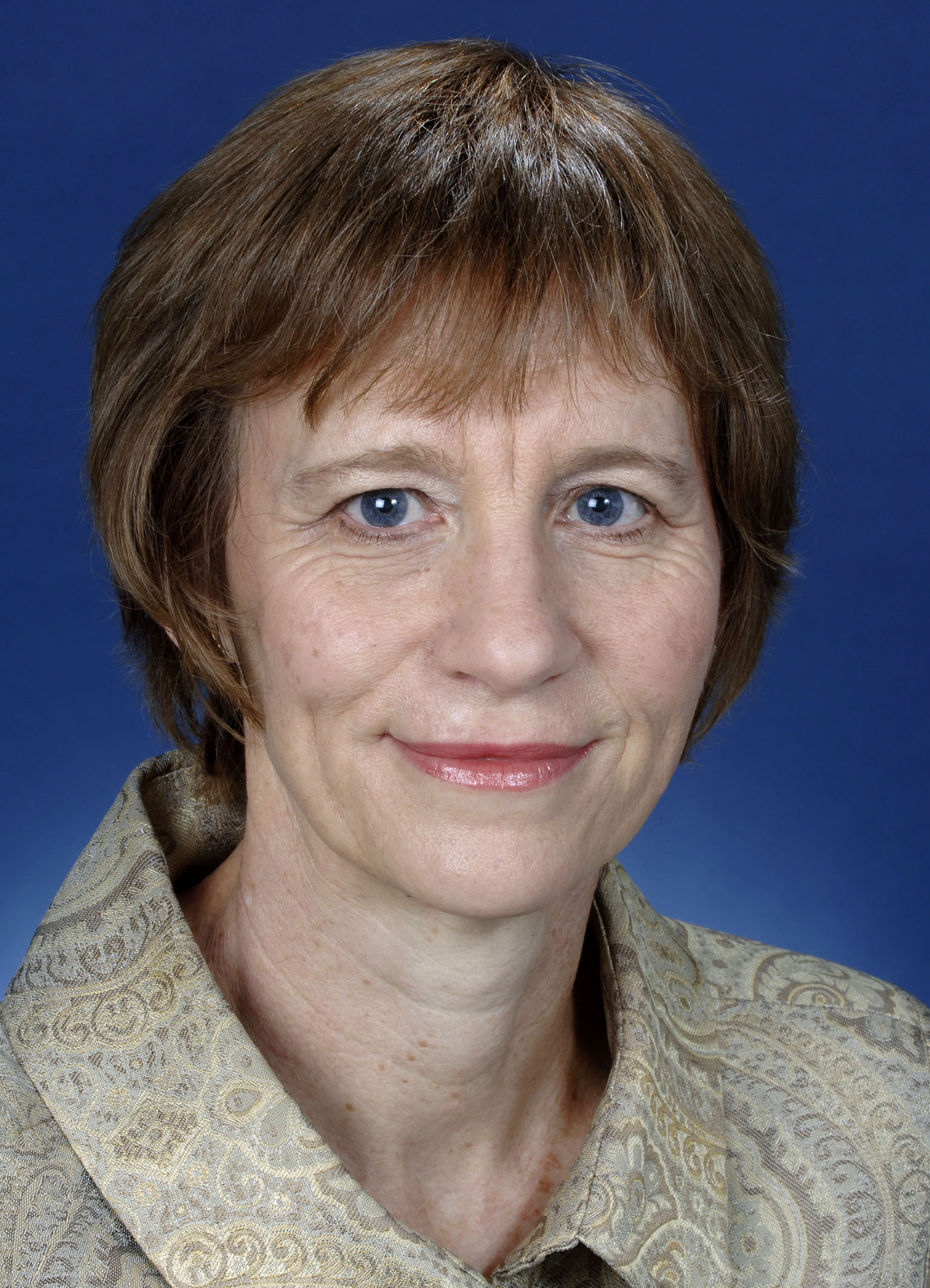
- Jean Dunn (2009)
- Education: Monash University (BA (Hons))
- Occupations: Australian public servant and diplomat

Jean Dunn is an Australian diplomat and a senior career officer with the Department of Foreign Affairs and Trade.

From 2012 to 2016, Dunn was the Australian Ambassador to Poland. Dunn presented her credentials to Polish President Bronisław Komorowski on 17 January 2012.

Prior to her posting to Poland, Dunn was Australian Ambassador to Lebanon from 2009 to 2010 and to Turkey from 2004 to 2007, with earlier postings to South Korea and the United States.

Ms. Dunn holds a Bachelor of Arts degree with Honours in Japanese language and politics from Monash University. She has three children.

Diplomatic posts
Preceded by Jon Philp	Australian Ambassador to Turkey; 2004–2007	Succeeded by Peter Doyle
Preceded by Lyndall Sachs	Australian Ambassador to Lebanon; 2009–2010	Succeeded by Lex Bartlem
Preceded by Ruth Pearce	Australian Ambassador to Poland; 2012–2016	Succeeded by Paul Wojciechowski
