= Richard Woolcott =

Australian diplomat (1927–2023)

Richard Woolcott AC

Secretary of the Department of Foreign Affairs
- In office 1988–1992

Personal details
- Born: Richard Arthur Woolcott; 11 June 1927 Sydney, Australia
- Died: 2 February 2023 (aged 95) Canberra, Australia
- Spouse: Birgit Christensen (m. 1952; died 2008)
- Children: 3, including Peter
- Education: University of Melbourne
- Occupation: Public servant; diplomat; author

Richard Arthur Woolcott AC (11 June 1927 – 2 February 2023) was an Australian public servant, diplomat, author, and commentator.

== Early years ==
Woolcott was educated at Geelong Grammar School and the University of Melbourne, before becoming a member of the Australian Diplomatic Service. Woolcott's first posting in the diplomatic service was as third secretary at the Australian Embassy in Moscow.

== Later career ==
In 1967, Woolcott drafted a speech for Prime Minister Harold Holt that said Australia was geographically part of Asia and that it was "a basic tenet of our national policy to live in friendship and understanding with our Asian neighbours". Between 1967 and 1970, Woolcott was the Australian high commissioner to Ghana. In the role, he regularly visited several capitals and cities throughout West Africa. From 1975 to 1978 he was Australia's ambassador to Indonesia, at the time of the Indonesian invasion of East Timor. In a series of oft-cited and highly-influential cables throughout his ambassadorship, he urged his country to take a 'pragmatic' or 'Kissingerian' approach to the Indonesian incorporation of East Timor, largely due to the importance of the Suharto regime to Australia's strategic and foreign policy goals and its relations with ASEAN and the region, although also informed by the under-sea oil resources that Australia was claiming close to Timor. Subsequently, Woolcott was appointed Australia's ambassador to the Philippines between 1978 and 1982.

American cables leaked by Wikileaks reveal that Woolcott had been an informant to the US, providing consular officials with information of internal government processes during 1974.

Woolcott was the Australian ambassador to the United Nations from 1982 to 1988, and served as the president of the United Nations Security Council for Australia's term in November 1985. Woolcott also served as secretary of the Department of Foreign Affairs and Trade (DFAT), the most senior diplomatic position in Australia, from 1988 to 1992. As DFAT Secretary, he was involved in the establishment of the Asia-Pacific Economic Cooperation (APEC) forum. On 4 June 2008, Australian Prime Minister Kevin Rudd announced that Woolcott had been appointed an envoy to conduct discussions to form a new Asian regional forum.

From 1997, Woolcott was the founding director of the Asia Society AustralAsia Centre.

In 2003, Woolcott wrote a personal memoir entitled The Hot Seat: Reflections on Diplomacy from Stalin's Death to the Bali Bombings, and he also wrote a book called Undiplomatic Activities in 2007.

== Personal life and death ==
Woolcott was a supporter of the Australian Republican Movement, and gave the Inaugural National Republican Lecture in 2003.

Woolcott married Danish-born Birgit Christensen in London in July 1952 and the couple moved to Moscow shortly after the wedding. Birgit died from lung cancer in 2008. The couple's son, Peter, is also a diplomat and has served as the Australian ambassador to Italy and chief of staff to Australian Prime Minister Malcolm Turnbull. Woolcott died in Canberra on 2 February 2023, at age 95.

== Awards and honours ==
For his services to diplomacy and international relations, he was made an Officer of the Order of Australia in 1985, and advanced to a Companion of the Order in 1993.

In July 2008, Woolcott was selected as one of the inaugural fellows of the Australian Institute of International Affairs to highlight his distinction in and contribution to Australia's international affairs. Also that year, Woolcott was awarded the Sir Edward "Weary" Dunlop Asia Medal, in recognition of his contribution to Australia's relationships with Asia.

Government offices
Preceded by Stuart Harris	Secretary of the Department of Foreign Affairs and Trade; 1988–1992	Succeeded by Peter Wilenski
Diplomatic posts
Preceded by John Ryan	Australian High Commissioner to Ghana; 1967–1970	Succeeded by John McMillan
Preceded by Robert Furlonger	Australian Ambassador to Indonesia; 1975–1978	Succeeded by Tom Critchley
Preceded by Gerry Nutter	Australian Ambassador to the Philippines; 1978–1982	Succeeded by Roy Fernandez
Preceded by Harold David Anderson	Permanent Representative of Australia to the United Nations; 1982–1988	Succeeded by Michael Costello as Acting Permanent Representative
