= George Dunbar Moore =

Australian admiral, diplomat (1893–1979)

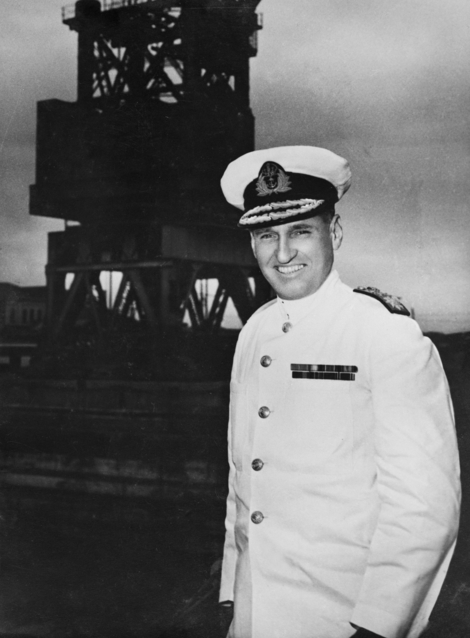
- Rear Admiral George Moore c. 1945
- Born: 10 October 1893; Springsure, Queensland
- Died: 27 July 1979 (aged 85); Darlinghurst, New South Wales
- Spouse: Doretta Ziele Russell (m. 1923)
- Military career
- Allegiance: United Kingdom; Australia
- Branch: Royal Naval Reserve (1912–13); Royal Australian Navy (1913–50)
- Service years: 1912–1950
- Rank: Rear Admiral
- Commands: Flag Officer in Command New South Wales (1947–50); Naval Officer in Command Sydney (1944–47); HMAS Canberra (1941–42); HMAS Australia (1941); HMS Dauntless (1939–41); HMS Curacoa (1939); HMAS Stuart (1937–38); HMAS Yarra (1936–37); HMS Dunoon (1932–34)
- Conflicts: First World War; Second World War
- Awards: Commander of the Order of the British Empire
- Other work: Australian Minister to the Philippines (1950–55)

Rear Admiral George Dunbar Moore, CBE (10 October 1893 – 27 July 1979) was a senior commander in the Royal Australian Navy and a diplomat.

Moore was appointed Australia's first Minister to the Philippines in 1950, leaving his position as naval flag officer in charge of Sydney to take up the post in Manila. In 1954, Moore made front-page news in the Philippines when local media claimed he lashed out at security officers at his residence. Moore retired from the position a year later in July 1955.

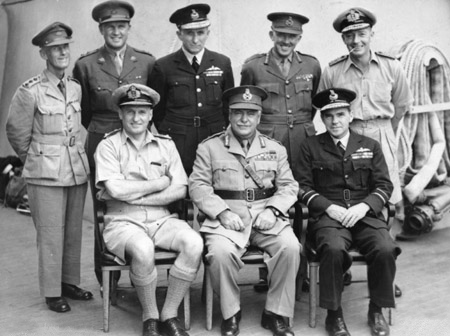
Moore (seated, left) with General Sir Thomas Blamey (seated, centre) and other Australian delegates at the Japanese surrender aboard USS Missouri, September 1945

Diplomatic posts
Preceded by Keith Waller as Consul-General	Australian Minister to the Philippines; 1950–1955	Succeeded by Mick Shann
