= Peter Henderson (Australian public servant) =

Australian public servant

Peter Henderson AC

Secretary of the Department of Foreign Affairs
- In office 4 September 1979 – 3 September 1984

Personal details
- Born: Peter Graham Faithfull Henderson; 1 October 1928
- Died: 25 September 2016 (aged 87) Canberra
- Spouse: Heather (née Menzies)
- Children: 4
- Education: University of Oxford
- Occupation: Public servant

Peter Graham Faithfull Henderson, AC (1 October 1928 – 25 September 2016) was an Australian senior public servant. He was Secretary of the Department of Foreign Affairs between 1979 and 1984. He was also well known for being the son-in-law of Robert Menzies.

== Early life and marriage ==
Henderson was born in October 1928. He was educated at Tudor House School, Moss Vale, NSW and Geelong Grammar School, Victoria, and Merton College, Oxford (1947–1950). In May 1955, Henderson married Heather Menzies, daughter of Robert Menzies, the Australian Prime Minister. They had their first child, a daughter, in March 1956, in Jakarta.

== Career and later life ==
Henderson began his career in the Australian Public Service in the Department of External Affairs in 1951.

He was appointed Secretary of the Department of Foreign Affairs in 1979. During his time at the department he introduced rules to prevent couples being posted together, which was interpreted by those it affected as a "pincer movement" against career equality for female diplomats.

At the end of his public service career in September 1984, Henderson was offered positions in Rome and Ottawa—he chose to retire, and denounced the Australian Government for using the diplomatic service as a "depository... for people they want to get rid of in Canberra".

Henderson died in Canberra on 25 September 2016.

== Awards ==
In January 1985, Henderson was made a Companion of the Order of Australia in recognition of distinguished public service.

== References and further reading ==
- Henderson, Peter (1986), Privilege and Pleasure, Methuen Haynes, ISBN 0454012330
- Henderson, Peter (August 2008), "Chapter 2: Peter Henderson, AC: Secretary of the Department of Foreign Affairs 1979–84", in Wilson, Trevor; Cooke, Graham (eds.), Steady Hands Needed: Reflections on the role of the Secretary of Foreign Affairs and Trade in Australia 1979–1999 (PDF), pp. 13–25, ISBN 9781921536137, archived from the original (PDF) on 8 February 2014

Diplomatic posts
Preceded by James Ingram	Australian Ambassador to the Philippines; 1973–1975	Succeeded by Gerry Nutter
Government offices
Preceded by Nick Parkinson	Secretary of the Department of Foreign Affairs; 1979–1984	Succeeded by Stuart Harris
