= Gerry Nutter =

Australian public servant and diplomat

Australian Ambassador to Italy
- In office 1985–1987
- Monarch: Elizabeth II
- Prime Minister: Bob Hawke
- Preceded by: Keith Douglas-Scott
- Succeeded by: A.D. Campbell

Australian High Commissioner to Papua New Guinea
- In office 1978–1981
- Monarch: Elizabeth II
- Prime Minister: Malcolm Fraser
- Preceded by: Tom Critchley
- Succeeded by: Robert Birch

Australian Ambassador to the Philippines
- In office 1975–1978
- Monarch: Elizabeth II
- Prime Minister: Malcolm Fraser
- Preceded by: Peter Henderson
- Succeeded by: Richard Woolcott

Personal details
- Born: Daniel Gerald Nutter; 7 June 1928
- Died: 13 September 2016 (aged 88) Canberra, Australian Capital Territory

Daniel Gerald "Gerry" Nutter (7 June 1928 – 13 September 2016) was an Australian public servant and diplomat.

== Education ==
Nutter was educated at North Sydney Boys High School.

== Career ==
Nutter joined the Department of External Affairs in 1949. His early postings were to Saigon, Katmandu, Delhi, Tokyo, Vientiane, Bonn and Berlin.

From 1973 to 1975, Nutter was head of national assessments in the Department of Defence, a precursor to the modern-day stand-alone Office of National Assessments. In the role he was responsible for long-term intelligence functions. His first ambassadorial post was Australian Ambassador to the Philippines, from 1975 to 1978. Nutter's next appointment was Australian High Commissioner to Papua New Guinea was announced in September 1977. While resident in Port Moresby, Nutter made extensive tours to inspect Australian tax-funded development projects across the nation.

In 1985, Nutter was appointed Australian Ambassador to Italy.

== Death ==
Nutter died on 13 September 2016.

Diplomatic posts
Preceded by Peter Henderson	Australian Ambassador to the Philippines; 1975–1978	Succeeded by Richard Woolcott
Preceded by Tom Critchley	Australian High Commissioner to Papua New Guinea; 1978–1981	Succeeded by Robert Birch
Preceded by Keith Douglas-Scott	Australian Ambassador to Italy; 1985–1987	Succeeded by A.D. Campbell
