= Richard Smith (diplomat) =

Richard Smith AM

High Commissioner to the United Kingdom
- In office March 1991 – April 1994
- Preceded by: Doug McClelland
- Succeeded by: Neal Blewett

Personal details
- Born: Richard John Smith; 14 December 1934 Tamworth, New South Wales
- Died: 26 July 2015 (aged 80)
- Education: University of Sydney
- Occupation: Public servant, diplomat

Richard John Smith AM (14 December 1934 – 26 July 2015) was an Australian diplomat.

Smith was born in Tamworth, New South Wales and educated at Sydney High School and the University of Sydney. He worked as a teacher in London in the late 1950s, then as a solicitor in New South Wales, before joining the Australian Department of External Affairs in 1961. He had several postings in the United States, with the United Nations, and in Switzerland.

Smith's first ambassadorial posting was as Ambassador to Israel from 1975 to 1977. He was Ambassador to Thailand from 1985 to 1988, and Ambassador to the Philippines from 1994 to 1996. After serving as Deputy Secretary of the Department of Foreign Affairs and Trade in Canberra, he was appointed as Australian High Commissioner to the United Kingdom from 1991 to 1994.

From 1996 to 1998, he was the Director-General of the Office of National Assessments, an Australian intelligence agency reporting to the Prime Minister. As head of ONA, he was responsible for advising the Prime Minister and the Government on political, strategic and economic developments affecting Australia's national interests.

In 1997, Smith was appointed a Member of the Order of Australia for service to international relations, particularly in the areas of commerce and trade.

He died on 26 July 2015.

Diplomatic posts
| Preceded by Rawdon Dalrymple | Australian Ambassador to Israel; 1975–1977 | Succeeded by Walter Handmer |
| Preceded by Gordon Jockel | Australian Ambassador to Thailand; 1985–1988 | Succeeded by Richard Butler |
| Preceded by Doug McClelland | Australian High Commissioner to the United Kingdom; 1991–1994 | Succeeded by Neal Blewett |
| Preceded by Mack Williams | Australian Ambassador to the Philippines; 1994–1996 | Succeeded by Miles Kupa |
Government offices
| Preceded by Philip Flood | Director-General of the Office of National Assessments; 1996–1998 | Succeeded by Kim Jones |
