= David Hay (diplomat) =

Australian diplomat and public servant

Sir David Hay CBE DSO
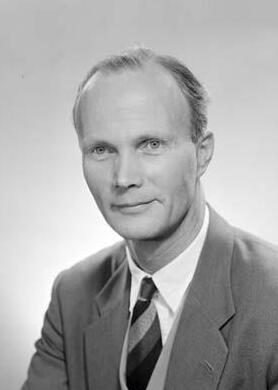
- Hay in 1960

Administrator of Papua and New Guinea
- In office 9 January 1967 – 1970
- Monarch: Elizabeth II
- Prime Minister: Harold Holt; John McEwen; John Gorton
- Preceded by: Donald Cleland
- Succeeded by: Les Johnson

Secretary of the Department of Aboriginal Affairs
- In office 20 January 1977 – 20 July 1979

Personal details
- Born: David Osborne Hay; 29 November 1916 Corowa, New South Wales
- Died: 18 May 2009 (aged 92)
- Spouse: Alison Adams (d. 2002)
- Children: 2 sons
- Occupation: Public servant and diplomat

Military service
- Allegiance: Australia
- Branch/service: Australian Army
- Years of service: 1940–1949
- Rank: Lieutenant Colonel
- Unit: 2/6th Battalion (1940–46)
- Commands: 3rd Battalion (1948–49)
- Battles/wars: Second World War; Siege of Tobruk; Battle of Greece; New Guinea campaign; Battle of Milne Bay; Salamaua–Lae campaign; Aitape–Wewak campaign
- Awards: Knight Bachelor; Commander of the Order of the British Empire; Distinguished Service Order

Sir David Osborne Hay CBE DSO (29 November 1916 – 18 May 2009) was an Australian soldier, senior public servant and diplomat, who served as Australian Ambassador to the United Nations, Administrator of Papua New Guinea, and headed the departments of External Territories and Aboriginal Affairs.

== Early life career ==
David Hay was born in 1916 in Corowa, New South Wales, where his parents had a grazing property. His grandfather William Moule had played Test cricket for Australia. He attended Geelong Grammar School, becoming school captain and joint dux with Rupert Hamer, later Premier of Victoria. A member of the Geelong Grammar cricket team, he scored 284 runs in an innings, a record that stood for 60 years.

He studied at Oxford University, reading classics, ancient history and philosophy at Brasenose College, graduating with second-class honours, and playing cricket for the university team. He returned to Australia to join the public service, but found the fact that his degree was not from an Australian university was a barrier to entry. He continued studying, at Melbourne University.

David Hay joined the Treasury in 1939, moving to the Department of External Affairs shortly before the start of World War II. He joined the 2/6th Battalion, served in the Middle East, Greece and New Guinea, and rose to the rank of major. He married Alison Adams in 1944 and he returned to the war, earning the Distinguished Service Order (DSO) in 1945. After the war, he was lieutenant colonel commanding the 3rd Battalion in the Citizens' Military Forces.

== Public servant and diplomat ==
He returned to the public service and was appointed official secretary to the Australian High Commission in Ottawa, Ontario, Canada. He then spent a year at the Royal College of Defence Studies in Britain. He was appointed Australian Ambassador to Thailand, and played an important role in the early days of the Southeast Asia Treaty Organization (SEATO). In 1961, he returned to Canada as High Commissioner, from where he was appointed Ambassador to the United Nations 1964–65.

He was appointed Administrator of Papua and New Guinea, then an Australian territory, from 23 December 1966 (he arrived on 9 January 1967). This was in the period leading up to Papua New Guinea's self-government (1973) and independence (1975). His time was marred by clashes with the head of the Department of External Territories, George Warwick Smith, and he also made decisions without consulting the Minister for External Territories, Charles "Ceb" Barnes. In 1970, Hay spoke to the Prime Minister, John Gorton, after which Smith was moved to the Department of the Interior, Hay himself being appointed in Smith's place to head External Territories. The new PNG Administrator was Leslie Wilson Johnson, with whom Hay had a fruitful and positive relationship.

The Department of External Territories was abolished by the Whitlam government in 1973, and Hay was appointed Australia's first Military Ombudsman. He was appointed secretary of the Department of Aboriginal Affairs in 1976 by the Fraser government, retiring in 1979 on health grounds.

== Later life ==
Hay wrote a history of the 2/6th Battalion, Nothing Over Us. He bought back his birthplace Boomanoomana homestead and restored the old family house, garden, outbuildings and land, and wrote a biography of his great-grandfather, The Life And Times of William Hay of Boomanoomana, 1816–1908.

He was made a Member of the Order of the British Empire (MBE) in 1943, a Commander (CBE) in 1963, and was awarded a knighthood in 1979.

Sir David Hay's wife, Alison, died in 2002. He died on 18 May 2009, aged 92 in Melbourne, Victoria, Australia. He was survived by two sons and three granddaughters (all of whom went to Geelong Grammar School), and a daughter-in-law.

Diplomatic posts
Preceded by Bertram Ballard	Australian Minister to Thailand; 1955–1957	Succeeded by Keith Waller as Ambassador
Preceded by Walter Cawthorn	Australian High Commissioner to Canada; 1961–1964	Succeeded by Kenneth Bailey
Preceded by Sir James Plimsoll	Permanent Representative of Australia to the United Nations; 1964–1965	Succeeded by Patrick Shaw
Government offices
Preceded by Sir Donald Cleland	Administrator of Papua New Guinea; 1966–1970	Succeeded by Leslie Johnson
Preceded by George Smith	Secretary of the Department of External Territories; 1970–1973	Department dissolved
Preceded by Barrie Dexter	Secretary of the Department of Aboriginal Affairs; 1977–1979	Succeeded by Tony Ayers
