= List of ambassadors of Iran to Australia =

Ambassador of Iran to Australia
- Coat of Arms of Iran

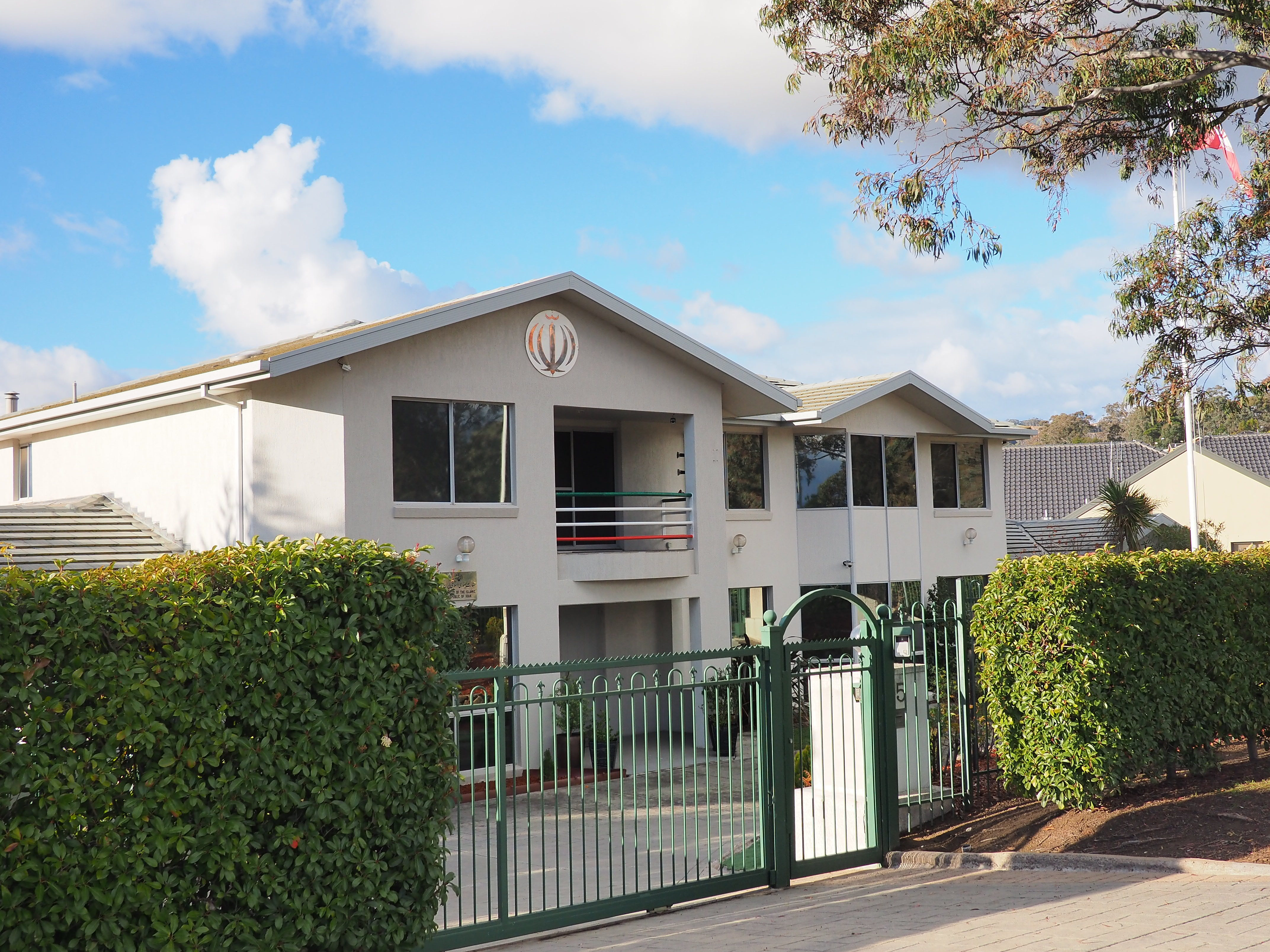
- Incumbent; Vacant since 26 August 2025
- Inaugural holder: Bahman Ahanin
- Formation: 17 December 1970

The Iranian ambassador in Canberra is the official representative of the Government in Tehran to the Government of Australia.

In August 2025, the then-Iranian ambassador, Ahmad Sadeghi was expelled following prime minister Anthony Albanese's declaration along with ASIO (Australian Security Intelligence Organisation) boss Mike Burgess that Iran orchestrated antisemitic disruptions across Australia.

== List of representatives ==
Diplomatic accreditation	Diplomatic accreditation Solar Hijri calendar	Ambassador	Persian language	Observations	List of heads of state of Iran	List of prime ministers of Australia	Term end	Term end Solar Hijri calendar
17 December 1970	1349	Bahman Ahanin	Persian: بهمن آهنین		Mohammad Reza Shah Pahlavi	John Gorton; William McMahon; Gough Whitlam	1 March 1973	1351
17 December 1970	1349	Hossein Eshraghi	Persian: حسین اشراقی		Mohammad Reza Shah Pahlavi	Gough Whitlam; Malcolm Fraser	1 December 1975	1354
1 December 1975	1354	Ali-Reza Heravi	Persian: علیرضا هروی		Mohammad Reza Shah Pahlavi	Malcolm Fraser	1 October 1977	1356
1 October 1977	1356	Khosrow Akmal	Persian: خسرو اکمل		Mohammad Reza Shah Pahlavi	Malcolm Fraser	1 January 1979	1357
1 January 1979	1357	Ehsanollah Mir-Saeid Qazi	Persian: احسان‌الله میرسعید قاضی	Chargé d'Affaires	Mohammad Reza Shah Pahlavi	Malcolm Fraser	1 June 1979	1358
1 January 1979	1357	Mohammad Nakhaei Menhaj	Persian: محمد نخعی منهاج		Mehdi Bazargan	Malcolm Fraser		
		Ahmad Asgharian Jeddi	Persian: احمد اصغریان جدی	Chargé d'Affaires				
		Mohammad Khodadadi	Persian: محمد خدادادی	Chargé d'Affaires				
1984	1363	Ahmad Attari	Persian: احمد عطاری		Ali Khamenei	Bob Hawke	1987	1366
1987	1366	Mehdi Khandaghabadi	Persian: مهدی خندق‌آبادی		Ali Khamenei	Bob Hawke	1990	1369
1990	1369	Mohammad-Hassan Ghadiri Abyaneh (fa)	Persian: محمدحسن قدیری ابیانه		Akbar Hashemi Rafsanjani	Bob Hawke; Paul Keating	1992	1371
		Mohammad Rouhisefat	Persian: محمد روحی‌صفت		Akbar Hashemi Rafsanjani	Paul Keating	1999	1378
1999	1378	Gholamali Khoshrou (fa)	Persian: غلامعلی خوشرو		Mohammad Khatami	John Howard	2002	1381
2002	1381	Hamid Aboutalebi	Persian: حمید ابوطالبی		Mohammad Khatami	John Howard	2006	1385
2006	1385	Mahmoud Movahhedi	Persian: محمود موحدی		Mahmoud Ahmadinejad	John Howard; Kevin Rudd	2009	1388
21 December 2009	1388	Mahmoud Babaei	Persian: محمود بابایی		Mahmoud Ahmadinejad	Kevin Rudd; Julia Gillard; Tony Abbott	2014	1393
20 August 2014	1393	Abdolhossein Vahhaji	Persian: عبدالحسین وهاجی		Hassan Rouhani	Tony Abbott; Malcolm Turnbull	20 August 2018	1397
29 August 2018	1397	Fereidoun Haghbin (fa)	Persian: فریدون حق‌بین		Hassan Rouhani	Malcolm Turnbull; Scott Morrison; Anthony Albanese	27 July 2023	1402
27 July 2023	1402	Ahmad Sadeghi (fa)	Persian: احمد صادقی		Ebrahim Raisi (2023–2024); Masoud Pezeshkian (2024–2025)	Anthony Albanese	26 August 2025	

== See also ==
- List of ambassadors of Australia to Iran
- Iran–Australia relations
