= Gordon Jockel =

Australian public servant and diplomat (1920–2015)

Gordon Jockel CBE
- Born: Gordon Albert Jockel; 4 June 1920; Manly, New South Wales
- Died: 18 September 2015 (aged 95)
- Education: University of Sydney
- Occupations: Public servant, diplomat

Gordon Albert Jockel CBE (4 June 1920 – 18 September 2015) was an Australian public servant and diplomat.

Jockel joined Australia's diplomatic service in 1944. Among other roles, he served in appointments as Permanent Representative to the United Nations Office in Geneva, Commissioner to Singapore, Ambassador to Indonesia and Ambassador to Thailand.

From February 1972 to 1977, Jockel was Director of the Joint Intelligence Organisation.

Jockel died on 18 September 2015.

== Awards ==
In June 1964, Jockel was made an Officer of the Order of the British Empire. He was promoted to a Commander of the Order in the 1971 Queen's Birthday Honours.

Diplomatic posts
Preceded by Ralph Harry	Permanent Representative of Australia to the United Nations Office in Geneva; 1956–1959	Succeeded by Lawrence Arnott
Preceded by David McNicol	Australian Commissioner to Singapore; 1960–1963	Succeeded by
Preceded by Max Loveday	Australian Ambassador to Indonesia; 1969–1972	Succeeded by Robert Furlonger
Preceded by Marshall Johnston	Australian Ambassador to Thailand; 1978–1985	Succeeded by Richard Smith
