= Keith Waller =

Australian public servant and diplomat

Sir Keith Waller CBE
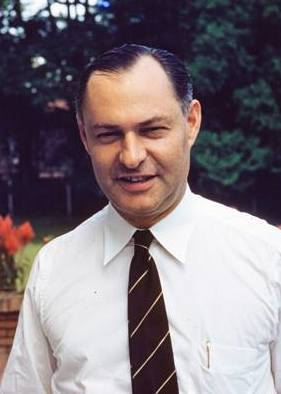
- Waller in 1958

Secretary of the Department of External Affairs
- In office 6 April 1970 – 6 November 1970

Secretary of the Department of Foreign Affairs
- In office 6 November 1970 – 3 January 1974

7th Ambassador of Australia to the United States
- In office 20 April 1964 – 1 June 1970
- Preceded by: Howard Beale
- Succeeded by: James Plimsoll

Personal details
- Born: John Keith Waller; 19 February 1914
- Died: 14 November 1992 (aged 78)
- Parent: Arthur James Waller
- Education: University of Melbourne
- Occupation: Public servant

Sir (John) Keith Waller CBE (19 February 1914 – 14 November 1992) was a senior Australian public servant and diplomat.

== Life and career ==
Keith Waller was born in Melbourne in 1914. He was educated at Scotch College and Ormond College at the University of Melbourne.

Waller joined the Commonwealth Public Service in 1936, in the Department of External Affairs. In 1937, he was appointed Private Secretary to Billy Hughes, then Minister for External Affairs.

His career proved to be long and successful, establishing himself as a successful diplomat across a number of postings, including to Moscow, Washington and Bangkok. In 1943 whilst senior officer to the Australian Legation at Chungking, Waller married Alison Dent in Bombay, India.

Waller was Australian Consul-General in Manila from 1948 to 1950. During this time he dealt with the fall-out of the Lorenzo Gamboa case, which saw a Filipino man separated from his wife and children due to the White Australia policy. He received death threats, but later downplayed its significance and dismissed it as a "trivial case".

He was appointed Secretary of the Department of External Affairs (later Department of Foreign Affairs in 1970), retiring from the public service in 1974 on his 60th birthday.

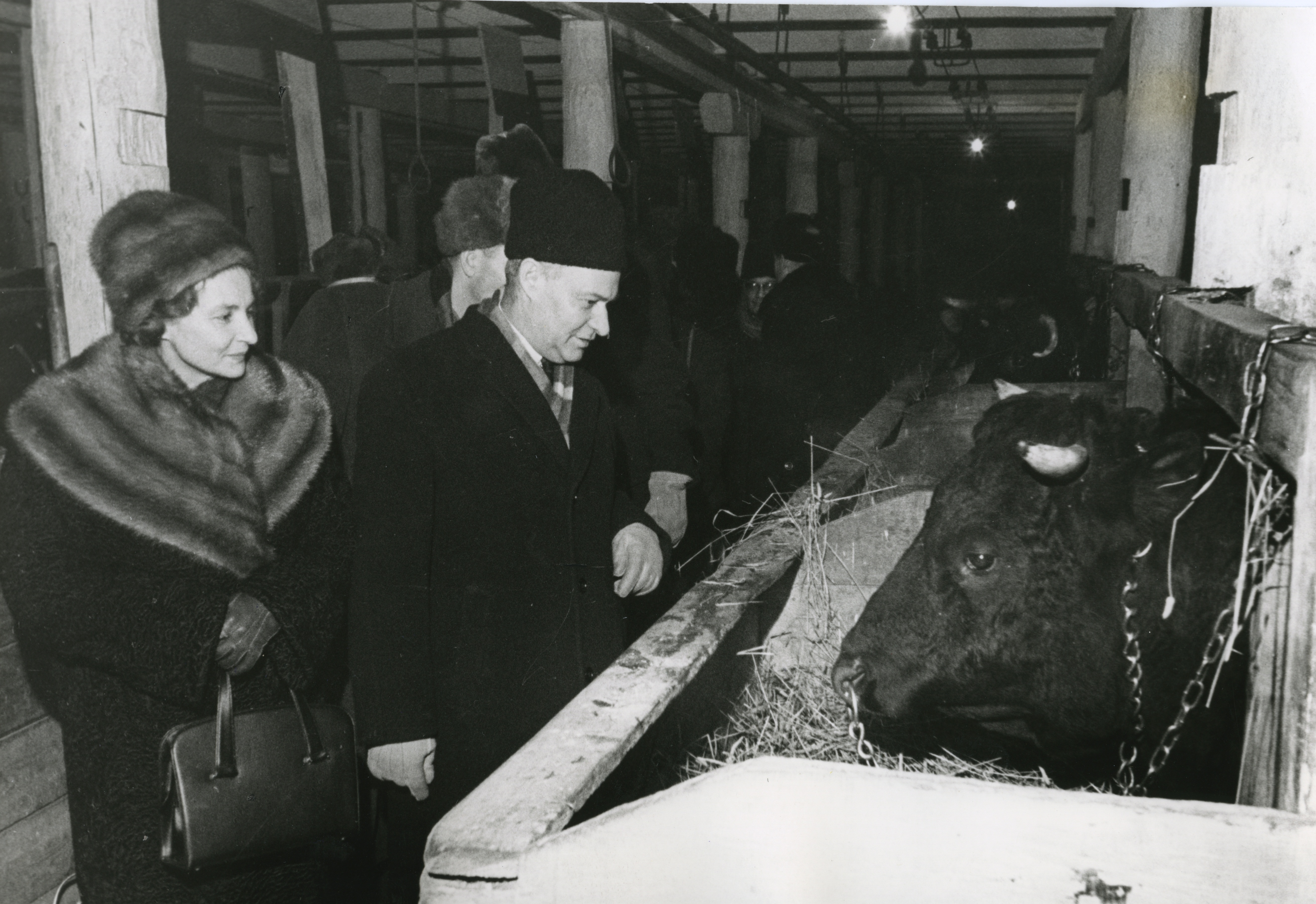
Waller in Siberia, 1960s

Soon after his retirement, Waller prepared a brief assessing the Australian Government security and intelligence apparatus as it existed in the mid-1970s.

Waller died in Canberra on 14 November 1992 aged 78.

== Awards ==
In June 1961, Waller was appointed a Commander of the Order of the British Empire whilst Ambassador to the USSR. He was made a Knight Bachelor in 1968 during his time as Ambassador to the United States of America.

A street in the Canberra suburb of Casey was named Keith Waller Rise in 2011, in Waller's honour.

Government offices
| Preceded by James Plimsoll | Secretary of the Department of External Affairs; 1970 | Succeeded by Himself as Secretary of the Department of Foreign Affairs |
| Preceded by Himself as Secretary of the Department of External Affairs | Secretary of the Department of Foreign Affairs; 1970 – 1974 | Succeeded by Alan Renouf |
Diplomatic posts
| Preceded by Herbert Peterson | Australian Consul-General in the Philippines; 1948 – 1950 | Succeeded by George Dunbar Moore as Minister to the Philippines |
| Preceded by David Hay | Australian Ambassador to Thailand; 1958–1960 | Succeeded by Malcolm Booker |
| Preceded by Bill Cutts | Australian Ambassador to the Soviet Union; 1960–1962 | Succeeded by Stewart Wolfe Jamieson |
| Preceded by Howard Beale | Australian Ambassador to the United States; 1964 – 1970 | Succeeded by James Plimsoll |
