= Department of Foreign Affairs (Australia) =

Australian government department, 1970–1987

Department overview
- Formed: 6 November 1970
- Preceding Department: Department of External Affairs (II)
- Dissolved: 24 July 1987
- Superseding Department: Department of Foreign Affairs and Trade
- Jurisdiction: Commonwealth of Australia
- Ministers responsible: William McMahon, Minister (1970–1971); Les Bury, Minister (1971); Nigel Bowen, Minister (1971–1972); Gough Whitlam, Minister (1972–1973); Don Willesee, Minister (1973–1975); Andrew Peacock, Minister (1975–1980); Tony Street, Minister (1980–1983); Bill Hayden, Minister (1983–1987)
- Department executives: Keith Waller, Secretary (1970–1974); Alan Renouf, Secretary (1974–1977); Nick Parkinson, Secretary (1977–1979); Peter Henderson, Secretary (1979–1984); Stuart Harris, Secretary (1984–1987); Dick Woolcott, Secretary (1987)

The Department of Foreign Affairs was an Australian government department that existed between November 1970 and July 1987. On 24 July 1987, its functions and jurisdiction (along with most of its staff, buildings and other assets), were transferred to the newly consolidated Department of Foreign Affairs and Trade.

== History ==
The department was formally created under the Gorton government, the new department representing a simple name change from the previous Department of External Affairs. The old External Affairs title was sometimes causing confusion and the name change, initiated by William McMahon as responsible minister, brought Australia into line with common international practice.

== Scope ==
Information about the department's functions and government funding allocation could be found in the Administrative Arrangements Orders, the annual Portfolio Budget Statements, and in the department's annual reports.

The department's functions, as at 1975 for example, were:

- The control and management of Australian Embassies, High Commissions, Consulates and similar permanent missions abroad having diplomatic and consular status.
- Responsibility within Australia for relationships between the Australian Government and foreign diplomatic missions and consulates and the representatives of other members of the Commonwealth.
- Publication of Diplomatic and Consular lists.
- All communications between the Australian Government and other governments whether passed through Australian missions abroad or foreign missions in Australia and all communications with Australian Government representatives overseas.
- All telegraphic traffic transmitted on behalf of Australian Government departments and authorities to overseas missions and all telegraphic traffic in the reverse direction.
- The Diplomatic Mail Service and Safe Hand Mail Service.
- Advice on Australian policy or matters that arise in the various organs of the United Nations and the Specialised Agencies associated with the United Nations and with the International Atomic Energy Agency. Apart from purely political issues these include questions of trusteeship, international relief and rehabilitation, and international economic and cultural relations.
- To act as a co-ordinating authority and channel for Australian participation which includes co-operation with several Australian Government and State Governments and authorities.
- Supervision over Australian participation in international conferences with a view to ensure co-ordination in policy and economy in representation.
- Acting as the liaison between the United Nations and Australian non-governmental bodies.
- Implementation of the Australia-New Zealand Agreement, the Security Treaty between Australia, New Zealand and the United States.
- Foreign policy aspects of Australian participation in the South South East Asia Collective Defence Treaty.
- Australian policy in respect of the South Pacific Commission.
- Advice in most fields of public international law, relations with the International Court of Justice, the International Law Commission.
- Negotiation and conclusion of treaties and international agreements, publication of the Australian Treaty Series and maintenance of the Australian Treaty List.
- Advice on matters relating to Australia's cultural relations with other governments and co-ordination and implementation of the work of other agencies of government and non-government bodies in the external cultural relations fields.

== Structure ==
The department was a Commonwealth Public Service department, staffed by officials who were responsible to the Minister for Foreign Affairs.
