= List of ambassadors of Australia to Turkey =

Ambassador of Australia to Turkey

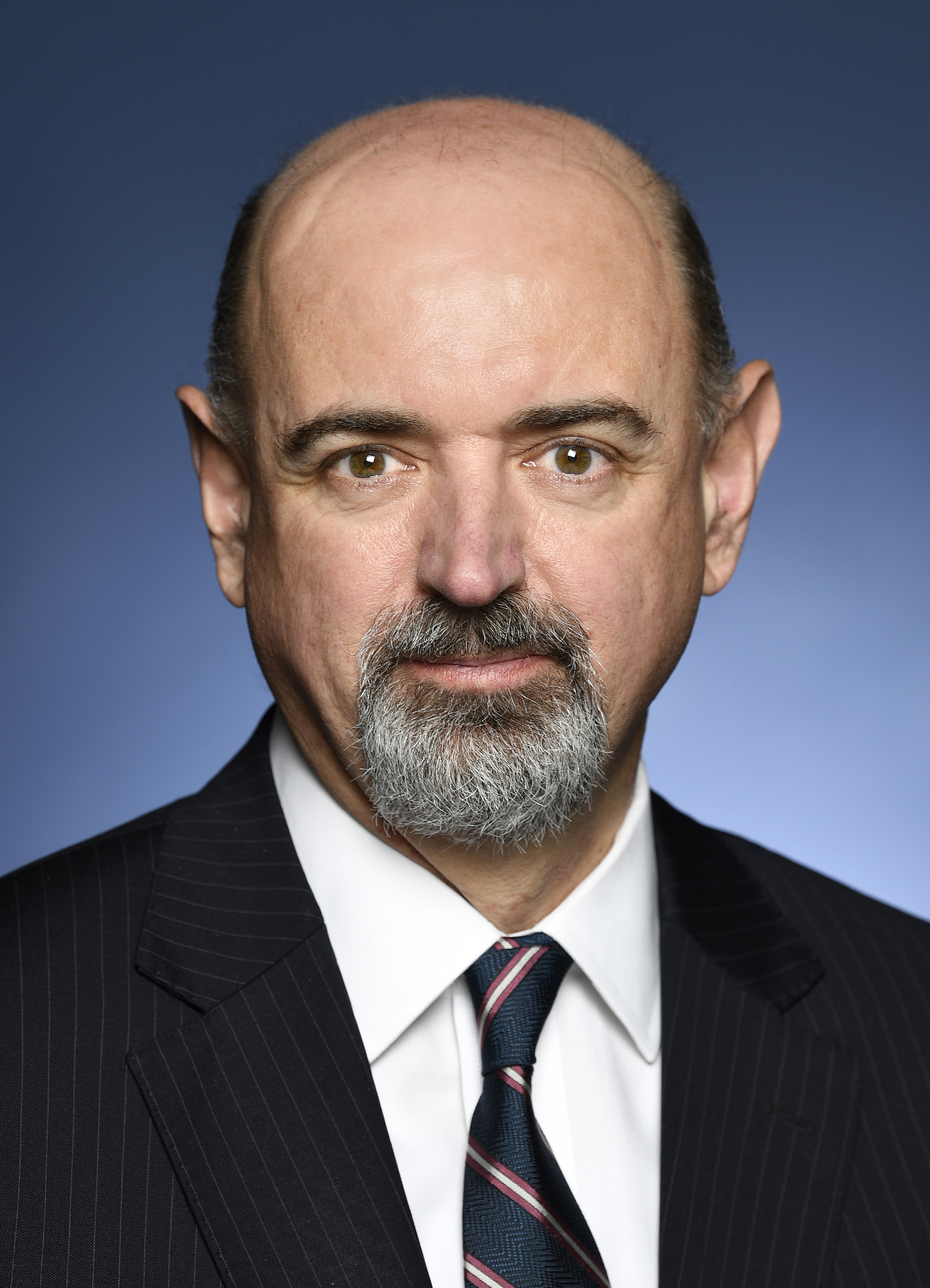
- Incumbent; Miles Armitage since 14 October 2021
- Department of Foreign Affairs and Trade
- Style: His Excellency
- Reports to: Minister for Foreign Affairs
- Residence: Ankara
- Nominator: Prime Minister of Australia
- Appointer: Governor General of Australia
- Inaugural holder: Alan McNicoll (as non-resident ambassador)
- Formation: 1968
- Website: Australian Embassy – Turkey, Azerbaijan, Georgia

The Ambassador of Australia to Turkey is an officer of the Australian Department of Foreign Affairs and Trade and the head of the Embassy of the Commonwealth of Australia to the Republic of Turkey. The ambassador resides in Ankara. Since 2011, non-resident accreditation has been held for Azerbaijan and Georgia, which were transferred from the Embassy in Moscow. The ambassador's work is assisted by a Consulate-General in Istanbul and a Consulate in Çanakkale (since 2006).

The current ambassador, since October 2021, is Miles Armitage.

== List of ambassadors ==
Ordinal	Officeholder	Other offices	Term start date	Term end date	Time in office	Notes
1	Alan McNicoll		1968	1973	4–5 years	
2	John McMillan		1973	1976	2–3 years	
3	Roy Peachey		1976	1980	3–4 years	
4	Barry Hall		1980	1984	3–4 years	
5	Philip Peters		1984	1987	2–3 years	
6	Don Witheford		1987	1992	4–5 years	
7	Geoffrey Price		1992	14 December 1993	0–1 years	
8	David Evans		14 December 1993	23 December 1997	4 years, 9 days	
9	Ian Forsyth		23 December 1997	6 June 2001	3 years, 165 days	
10	Jon Philp		6 June 2001	20 July 2004	3 years, 44 days	
11	Jean Dunn		20 July 2004	18 June 2007	2 years, 333 days	
12	Peter Doyle		18 June 2007	8 September 2010	3 years, 82 days	
13	Ian Biggs	^{A}^{B}	8 September 2010	27 November 2013	3 years, 80 days	
14	James Larsen	^{A}^{B}	27 November 2013	21 June 2017	3 years, 206 days	
15	Marc Innes-Brown PSM	^{A}^{B}	21 June 2017	2021	3–4 years	
16	Miles Armitage	^{A}^{B}	14 October 2021	incumbent	4 years, 328 days	

=== Notes ===
^A Also served as the non-resident Ambassador of Australia to Azerbaijan, since 2011.
^B Also served as the non-resident Ambassador of Australia to Georgia, since 2011.

== See also ==
- Australia–Turkey relations
