= List of ambassadors of Australia to Greece =

Ambassador of Australia to Greece

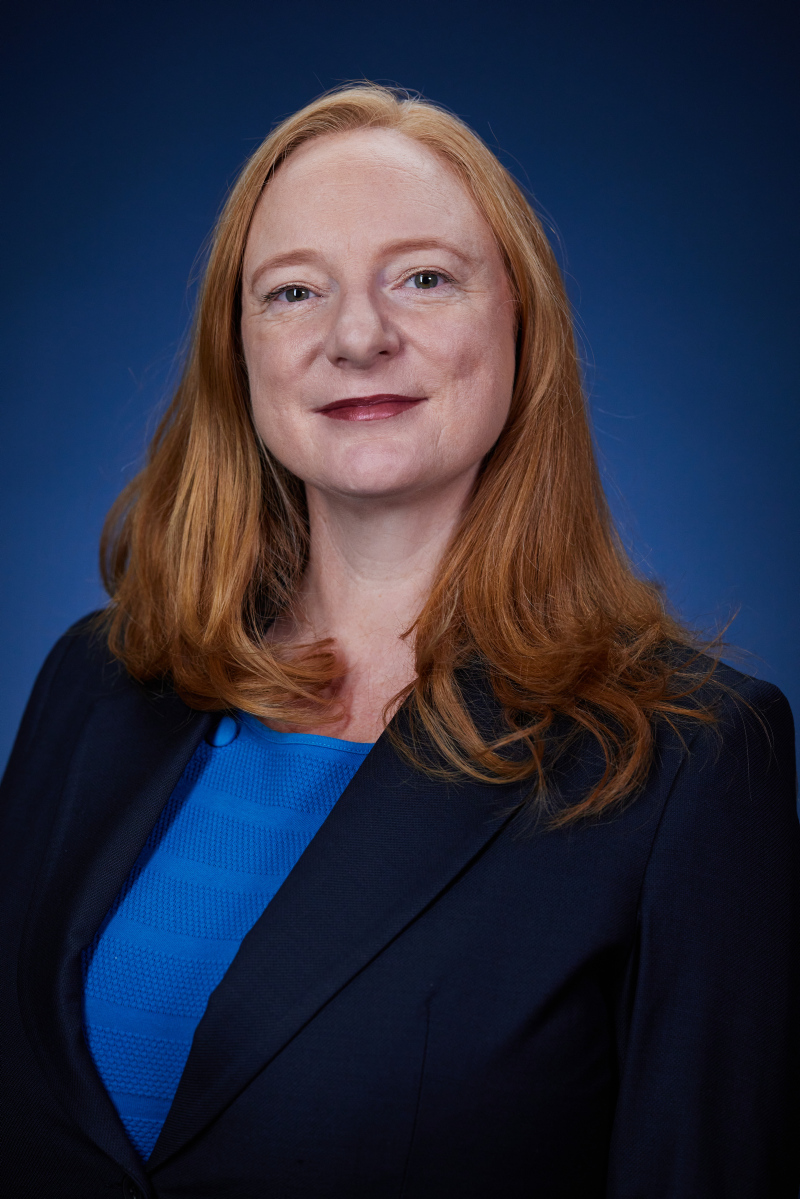
- Incumbent; Alison Duncan since July 2023
- Department of Foreign Affairs and Trade
- Style: Her Excellency
- Reports to: Minister for Foreign Affairs
- Residence: Athens
- Nominator: Prime Minister of Australia
- Appointer: Governor General of Australia
- Inaugural holder: Alfred Stirling
- Formation: 1964

The Ambassador of Australia to Greece is an officer of the Australian Department of Foreign Affairs and Trade and the head of the Embassy of the Commonwealth of Australia to the Hellenic Republic. The Ambassador resides in Athens and holds non-resident accreditation for Bulgaria and Romania. From 2004 to 2013, accreditation was also held for Albania, when it reverted to the Embassy in Rome.

The current ambassador, since July 2023, is Alison Duncan.

== List of ambassadors ==
Ordinal	Officeholder	Other offices	Term start date	Term end date	Time in office	Notes
1	Alfred Stirling		1964	1965	0–1 years	
2	Jo Gullett	^{A}	31 May 1965	1968	2–3 years	
3	Hugh Gilchrist	^{A}	1968	1972	3–4 years	
4	Barry Hall	^{A}^{B}	1972	1974	1–2 years	
5	Donald Horne	^{A}^{B}	1974	1976	1–2 years	
6	Les Johnson	^{A}^{B}	1976	1980	3–4 years	
7	Marshall Johnston	^{A}^{B}	1980	1984	3–4 years	
8	Donald Kingsmill	^{A}^{B}	1984	1987	2–3 years	
9	Kevin Gates	^{A}^{B}	1987	1991	3–4 years	
10	Alan Edwards	^{A}^{B}	1991	1996	4–5 years	
11	Robert Merrillees	^{A}^{B}	1996	1998	1–2 years	
12	Ross Burns	^{A}^{B}	1988	1991	2–3 years	
13	Stuart Hume	^{A}^{B}^{C}	2001	2005	3–4 years	
14	Paul Tighe	^{A}^{B}^{C}	2005	2008	2–3 years	
15	Jeremy Newman	^{A}^{B}^{C}	2008	2011	2–3 years	
16	Jenny Bloomfield	^{A}^{B}^{C}	2011	2014	2–3 years	
17	John Griffin	^{A}^{B}	2014	20 October 2017	2–3 years	
18	Kate Logan	^{A}^{B}	20 October 2017	December 2019	2 years, 1 month	
19	Arthur Spyrou	^{A}^{B}	December 2019	June 2023	3 years, 6 months	
20	Alison Duncan	^{A}^{B}	July 2023	incumbent	3 years, 3 months	

=== Notes ===
^A Also non-resident Australian Ambassador to Romania, since 18 March 1968.
^B Also non-resident Australian Ambassador to the Republic of Bulgaria, since 5 April 1972.
^C Also non-resident Australian Ambassador to the Republic of Albania, 2004 to 2013.
