= List of ambassadors of Australia to Iran =

Ambassador of Australia to Iran

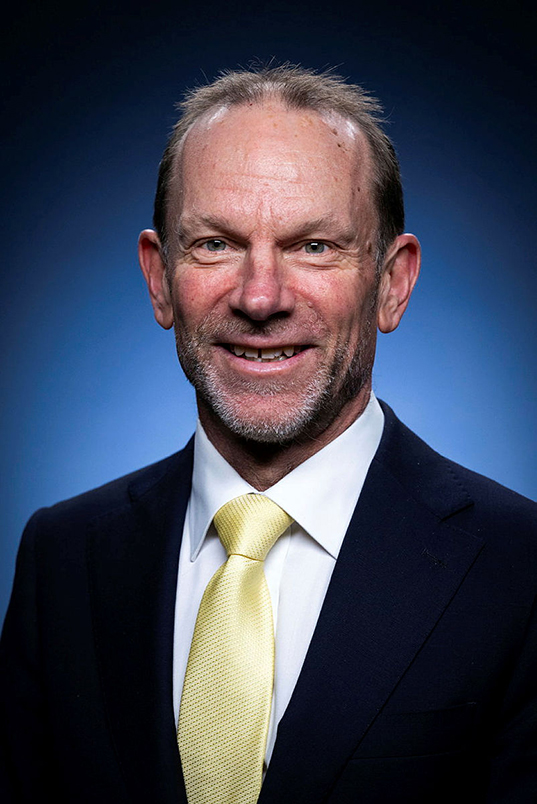
- Incumbent; Ian McConville since May 2024
- Department of Foreign Affairs and Trade
- Style: His Excellency
- Reports to: Minister for Foreign Affairs
- Residence: Tehran
- Nominator: Prime Minister of Australia
- Appointer: Governor General of Australia
- Inaugural holder: Barry Hall
- Formation: 1968

The ambassador of Australia to Iran is an officer of the Australian Department of Foreign Affairs and Trade and the head of the Embassy of the Commonwealth of Australia to the Islamic Republic of Iran.

The current ambassador, since May 2024, is Ian McConville.

== Heads of mission ==
Ordinal	Officeholder	Title	Term start date	Term end date	Time in office	Notes
1	Barry Hall	Ambassador of Australia to the Imperial State of Iran	1968	1972	3–4 years	
2	Henry Douglas White	Ambassador of Australia to the Imperial State of Iran	1972	1972	0 years	
3	Ivor Gordon Bowden	Ambassador of Australia to the Imperial State of Iran	1974	1978	3–4 years	
4	Marshall Johnston	Ambassador of Australia to the Imperial State of Iran	1978	1979	0–1 years	
n/a	Kevin J. Boreham	Charge d’Affaires ad interim	1979	1982	2–3 years	
n/a	William N. Fisher	Charge d’Affaires ad interim	1982	1983	0–1 years	
n/a	John Dauth	Charge d’Affaires ad interim	1983	1985	1–2 years	
5	John Lander	Ambassador of Australia to the Islamic Republic of Iran	1985	1987	1–2 years	
6	Michael Landale	Ambassador of Australia to the Islamic Republic of Iran	1987	1990	2–3 years	
7	John Oliver	Ambassador of Australia to the Islamic Republic of Iran	1990	1993	2–3 years	
8	Nick Warner	Ambassador of Australia to the Islamic Republic of Iran	1994	1997	2–3 years	
9	Stuart Hume	Ambassador of Australia to the Islamic Republic of Iran	1997	2001	3–4 years	
10	Jeremy Roger Newman	Ambassador of Australia to the Islamic Republic of Iran	2001	2005	3–4 years	
11	Greg Moriarty	Ambassador of Australia to the Islamic Republic of Iran	2005	2008	2–3 years	
12	Marc Innes-Brown	Ambassador of Australia to the Islamic Republic of Iran	2008	2013	4–5 years	
13	Paul Foley	Ambassador of Australia to the Islamic Republic of Iran	2013	2016	2–3 years	
14	Ian Biggs	Ambassador of Australia to the Islamic Republic of Iran	July 2016	2019	2–3 years	
15	Lyndall Sachs	Ambassador of Australia to the Islamic Republic of Iran	6 October 2019	23 April 2024	4–5 years	
16	Ian McConville	Ambassador of Australia to the Islamic Republic of Iran	23 April 2024	incumbent	2 years, 137 days	

== See also ==
- List of ambassadors of Iran to Australia
- List of ambassadors and high commissioners of Australia
