= Broinowski =

Broinowski is a surname of Polish origin. Notable people with the surname include:

- Alison Broinowski (born 1941), Australian academic, journalist, writer, and former diplomat
- Anna Broinowski (born 1969), Australian filmmaker
- Gracius Joseph Broinowski (1837–1913), Australian artist and ornithologist
- Richard Broinowski (born 1940), Australian public servant and diplomat
- Robert Broinowski (1877–1959), Australian public servant and poet

== See also ==
- Jacob Bronowski
