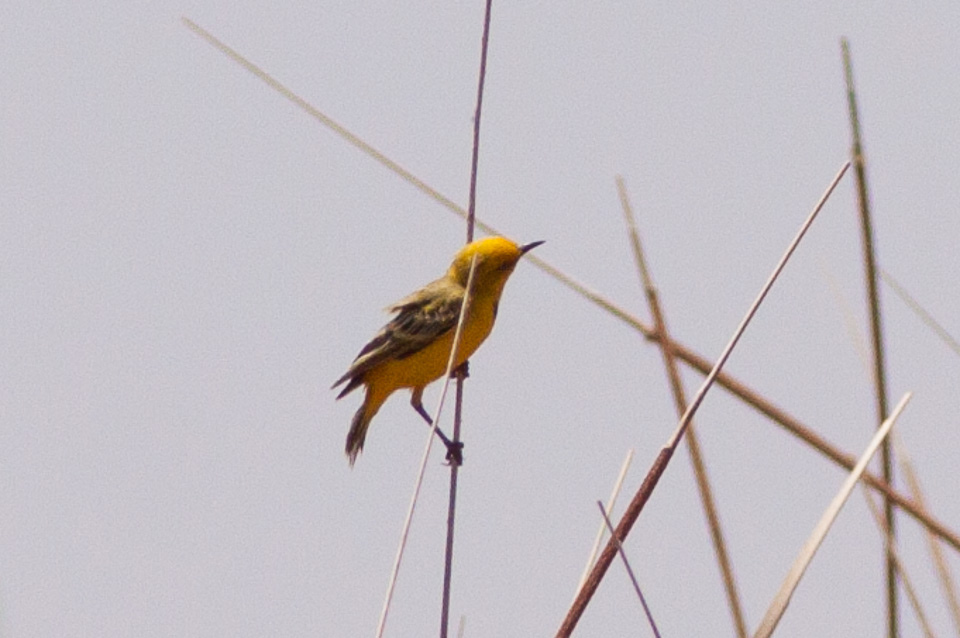

Conservation status
- Least Concern (IUCN 3.1)

Scientific classification
- Kingdom: Animalia
- Phylum: Chordata
- Class: Aves
- Order: Passeriformes
- Family: Meliphagidae
- Genus: Epthianura
- Species: E. crocea

Binomial name
- Epthianura crocea Castelnau & Ramsay, 1877

= Yellow chat =

Species of bird

The yellow chat (Epthianura crocea) is a small passerine bird endemic to Australia. They are known for their remarkable adaptions that aid their survival in their arid habitat.

== Taxonomy ==
The yellow chat is a passeriform in the family Meliphagidae. They were formally considered a separate family (Epthianuridae) until the discovery of their brush tongue and results from a DNA analysis led to their classification as honeyeaters in the family Meliphagidae. They are one of four species in the genus Epthianura, with the other three being the crimson chat (E. tricolor), the orange chat (E. aurifrons) and the white-fronted chat (E. albifrons). The derivation of the generic name Epthianura (Gould, 1838) is obscure, coming either from the Ancient Greek ephthos 'refined' or ephthinaō 'wasting away' and oura 'tail' (referring to Gould's description of chats as having a "short and truncated tail"). The specific epithet crocea is from Latin croceus 'golden-yellow'.

Four subspecies of Epthianura crocea were initially identified; however, only three are currently recognised. These subspecies are primarily distinguished by their morphological variances in the adult males' breeding plumages.

- Epthianura crocea crocea is found in the Kimberley to the Gulf of Carpentaria and the Lake Eyre Basin.
- Epthianura crocea tunneyi is restricted to a small area in the floodplains from the Adelaide River to the East Alligator River.
- Epthianura crocea macgregori, also known as the Capricorn yellow chat, occurs in the coastal region of central Queensland. This subspecies is considered critically endangered under the Environment Protection and Biodiversity Conservation Act 1999.

== Description ==
The yellow chat is a small passerine bird usually seen in groups of 2-10 individuals. They are approximately 11 cm (4.3 in) tall and weigh 9 g (0.32 oz). They are sexually dimorphic with the adult male having a bright golden-yellow forehead and underparts with a prominent black crescent breast band. The crown and nape are a grey-olive colour, the back is yellowish-brown and the tail is black with yellow tips on the feathers. The female is of similar colouring to the male but with a paler yellow colour and with no breast band. The juveniles are distinguished by being more greyish-brown in colour than the yellow displayed by their parents. All yellow chats, including juveniles, have a distinctive yellow rump when in flight. They have relatively long legs and toes, allowing them to forage with ease for food over low vegetation and on the ground. Yellow chats can also be identified by their distinctive, high-pitched and tuneful pee pee call.

== Distribution and habitat ==
The yellow chat occurs patchily throughout northern Australia, ranging across the arid zone from north-eastern South Australia and south-western Queensland to the north-west of the Northern Territory. There are some isolated populations in eastern Queensland and in north-west Western Australia. Their habitat is subject to high temperatures for most of the year and contains marshy plains vegetated with saltbush, rank grasses, or cumbungi reeds. These marshes have been formed by marine lagoons or inland artesian bore drains, creating a saline environment. This distribution includes the central arid region and the hot, subhumid monsoonal region. Most of the annual rainfall falls during the summer monsoon, leaving the remaining six months of the year with little rainfall.

=== Arid zone adaptations ===
It has been presumed that yellow chats would encounter problems living in their harsh, arid environment with high ambient temperatures, low ambient humidities and small amounts of surface water. Birds with small body weights are predicted to have high metabolic rates. Furthermore, small body weights will also lead to a higher rate of evaporative water loss compared to larger birds. These predictions suggest that the small body size of the yellow chats combined with their hot, dry, arid environment will result in heat stress and a high loss of water. This could be detrimental in their habitat where water is scarce.

Despite these predictions, yellow chats are able to prosper in their hot, arid habitat. Studies have found that the physiology of the yellow chats differs from other species of passerines with adaptations to help them cope with the challenging environment. Studies have shown that they are able to reduce their metabolic rate and evaporative water loss. The metabolic rate is mostly controlled by the concentration of thyroid hormone. Yellow chats have adapted to have lower levels of this hormone circulating in their body, resulting in a slower metabolism. This adaptation enables them to thrive in their harsh hot and dry environment.

Another suggested adaptation to help yellow chats survive in the arid region is their brush tongue. The brush tongue may be an adaptation to aid in retrieving drinking water. It allows the birds access to dew and the capability to drink thin water films, such as water seepages on surfaces of plants. Furthermore, the colour of their plumage is an adaptation aiding in their thermoregulation. Black pigments have been observed to increase heat absorption, with lighter colours absorbing less heat. This suggests that the yellow colouring of the yellow chats is an adaptation to reduce the amount of heat absorbed in their body.

== Behaviour ==
=== Diet ===
The yellow chat is a predominately insectivorous bird. They scavenge for their food in damp substrates, low vegetation or in shallow water.

=== Breeding ===
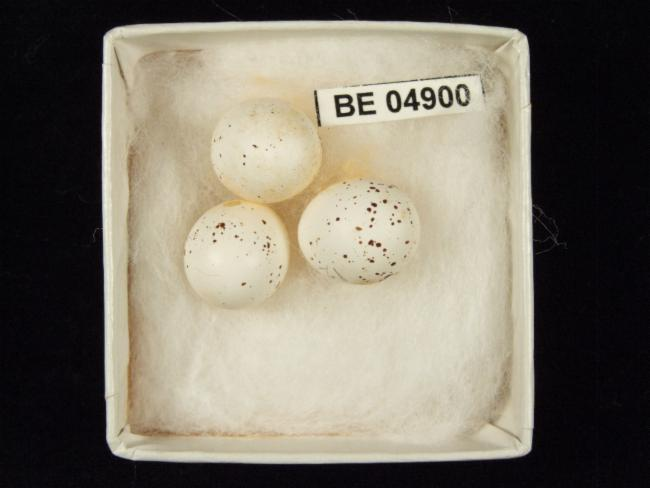
Epthianura crocea crocea eggs

Breeding season for the yellow chat has been observed from November to January after sufficient rain has fallen. At the beginning of the breeding season, the flocks disperse and male-female pairs form. The male follows his mate until egg-laying commences. The male defends their breeding territory by bill-clicking and chasing intruders. The female builds the nest close to the ground in small shrubs, usually samphire (Tecticornia) or in dense grass. The nests are made from vegetation such as fine twigs, rootlets, and grasses. The inside of the cup is lined with hair, usually horse or cow, and fine grasses. The female lays a clutch of two or three white to pinkish-white eggs, measuring 17 mm × 13 mm (0.67 in × 0.51 in) and marked with some reddish-brown splotches. Incubation of the eggs is approximately two weeks and alternates between the male and female.
