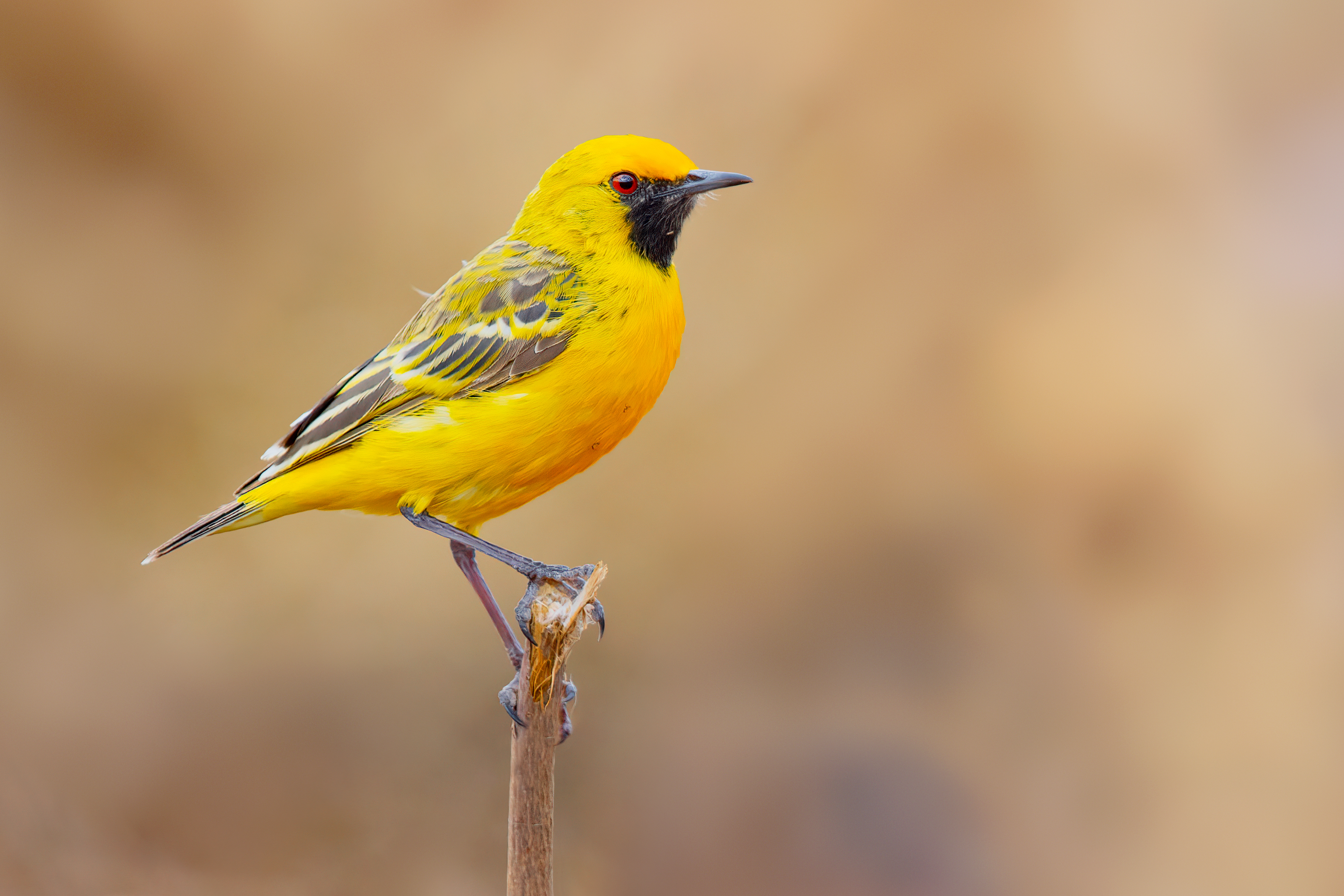

Conservation status
- Least Concern (IUCN 3.1)

Scientific classification
- Kingdom: Animalia
- Phylum: Chordata
- Class: Aves
- Order: Passeriformes
- Family: Meliphagidae
- Genus: Epthianura
- Species: E. aurifrons

Binomial name
- Epthianura aurifrons Gould, 1838

= Orange chat =

Species of bird

The orange chat (Epthianura aurifrons) is a species of bird in the family Meliphagidae. It is endemic to Australia.

== Description ==
The orange chat (Epthianura aurifrons) is endemic to Australia. Orange chats are usually 10–12 cm (3.9–4.7 in) in length, 10–12 g (0.35–0.42 oz) in weight and have an average wingspan of 19 cm (7.5 in). The orange chat is a small ground songbird with relatively long, broad, rounded wings and a short, square-ended tail. The orange chat is potbellied in shape with long thin legs, a short slender straight bill and a brush-tipped tongue. Male feathers are mostly a deep, warm, cadmium yellow with an orange overtone, and this colour is strongest on the crown and breast. Males' lores and throat are black, their rump is a golden orange with a tail finely tipped with white. Female chats are mottled in grey-brown with underparts being a softer fawny yellow. Orange chats do not have any seasonal differences in plumage.

=== Similar species ===
Bird species similar to and often confused with the orange chat are the yellow chat and the crimson chat; these birds are similar in size and shape. Orange chats have straighter and on average shorter bills. The adult male orange chat is rarely mistaken for another species with its vivid orange colouration and black throat patch. The male yellow chat is coloured almost as brightly as the orange chat but without such a warm orange overtone, being rather an intense lemon yellow. The grey-brown mottled females and immatures have yellow uppertail-coverts and a yellow underbody distinguishing them from the crimson chat. However, they are still similar in appearance to the female yellow chat.

=== Other common names ===
Orange-breasted, orange-fronted, golden-fronted or bush chat; orange-fronted nun or tang; bush or saltbush canary.

== Distribution and habitat ==
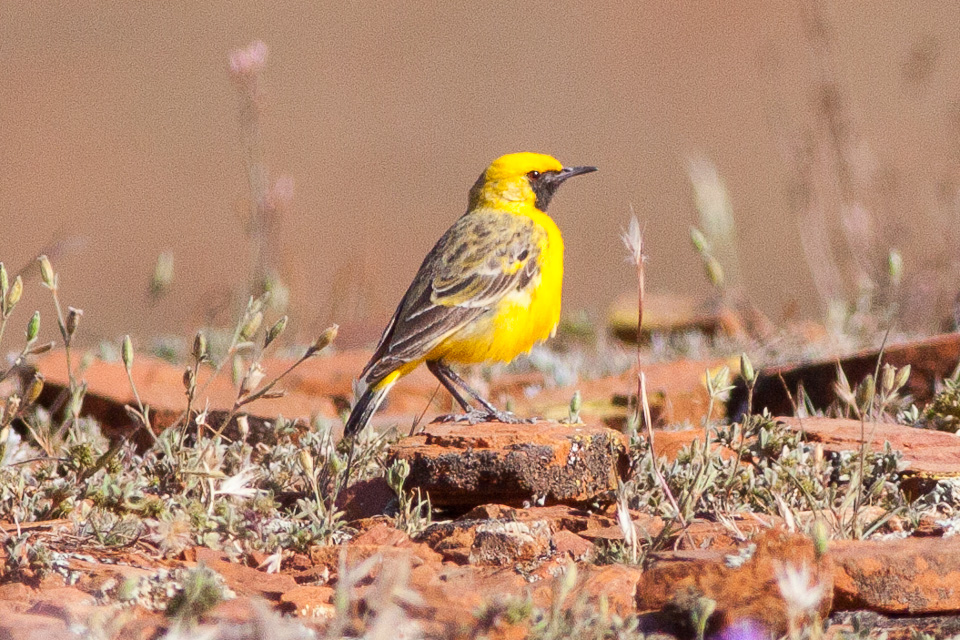
Orange Chat, Flinders Range National Park.

Orange chats are strongly nomadic within the arid and semi-arid zones of Australia that they inhabit. They are found mainly in the interior with some sightings in the northern tropics, and very occasionally they reach the coastal areas of South and Western Australia. The orange chat mostly occurs in dry, low-lying, saline environments that are rarely flooded such as sparsely vegetated gibber plains, salt pans, salt lakes, or claypans. They mainly inhabit low, treeless chenopod shrublands dominated by saltbush, bluebush or samphire, with either open or continuous shrub cover. They are sometimes recorded in other open or shrubby habitats, often near wetlands: low mulga, low buloke woodland; open acacia scrubland; dongas (steep-sided gullies) vegetated with tall shrubs or small trees including mulga, dead finish, belah or sugarwood; grassland; or sedgeland. The orange chat has occasionally been recorded in mallee woodlands and on farmlands, including areas over-run by scotch thistle.

=== Movement ===
The orange chat is nomadic, but less so than the crimson chat, and moves around irregularly. Movements are often determined by weather conditions, which will affect the availability of food in an area. During droughts or dry spells, the orange chat will be absent or nearly so from normal habitats and will sometimes be recorded towards the periphery of their usual range.

=== Banding ===
According to the Australian Bird and Bat Banding Scheme, of the 90 orange chats banded in Australia from 1953 to 1997, none have been recovered.

== Behaviour ==
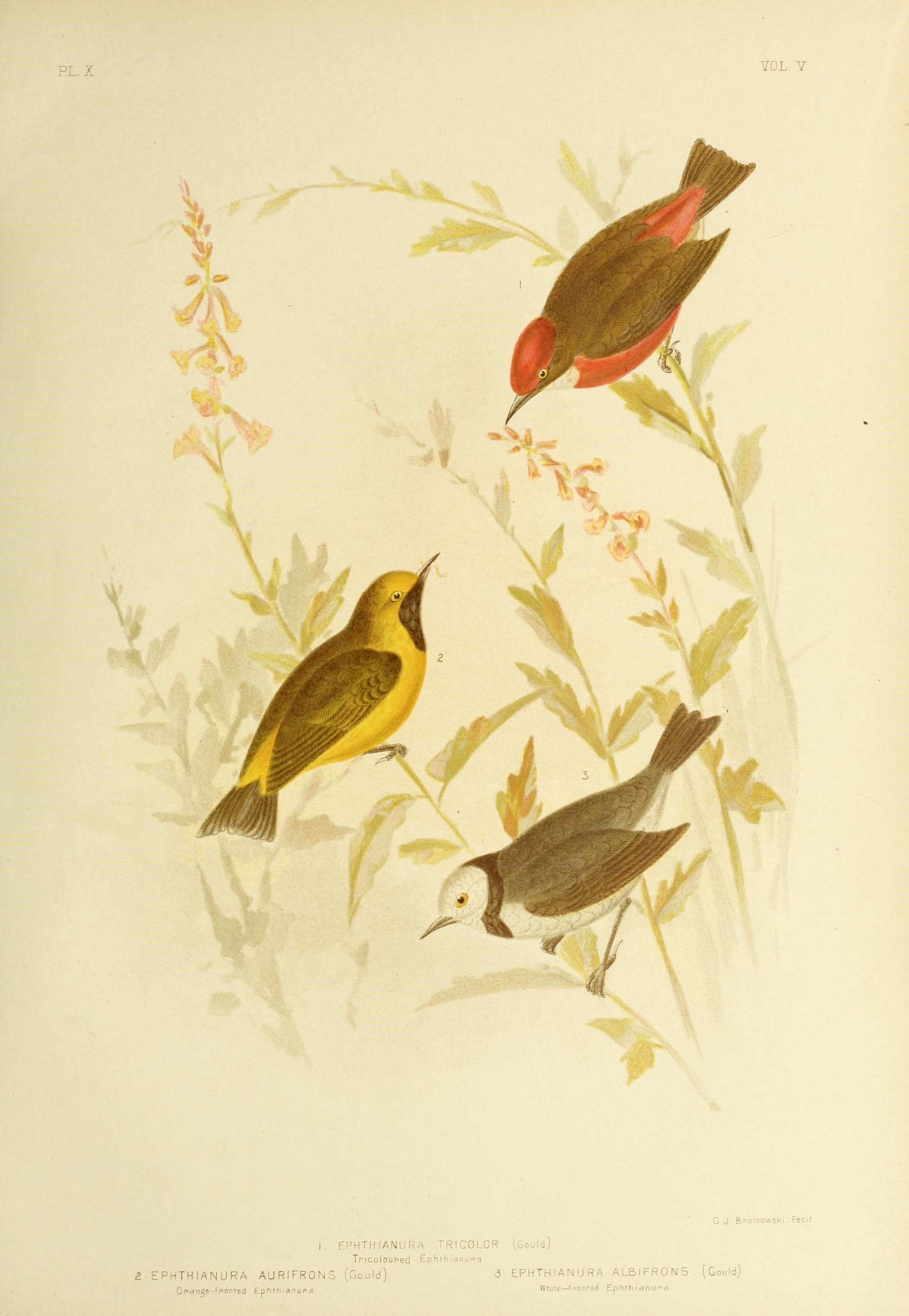
1891 illustration of orange chat from The birds of Australia (Broinowski)

The orange chat is gregarious and mobile with undulating flight, but they are also very wary, which does not allow close interactions. They are easy to see from a distance perched atop low bushes, shrubs or trees, due to the vivid orange plumage of the male. Males will often keep watch from a tall shrub or bush whilst the rest of the flock feeds out of sight. Foraging occurs on the ground or from low shrubs. Orange chats are usually seen in pairs or small groups of up to 15 birds, although flocks of more than 400 have been recorded locally. They are often spotted mixing with flocks of crimson and white-fronted chats and seen near or with flocks of zebra finches. When flushed, the orange chat will fly high, briefly perching atop a low shrub before disappearing onto the ground and between shrub cover.

At the start of the breeding season, flocks disperse into pairs. After the pair has formed, the male accompanies the female at all times until the eggs have been laid and chases other birds, often other males, that approach the pair; this behaviour is rarely seen outside the breeding season.

=== Defensive behaviour ===
Defence of territory is mainly performed by males when breeding; females usually only become involved when the male is absent.

=== Distraction displays ===
From incubation to just after fledging, one or both adults engage in distraction displays such as feigning injury by flapping along the ground. Sometimes they will not return to their nest while the observer or predator is present.

=== Voice ===
Most calls of the orange chat are a vibrant, metallic twang tang and a softer tchek tchek. Calls do not form a significant part of territorial activity, although the male clicks his bill when flying at intruders; this is often accompanied by a squeak. A soft shu-shu-shu is used by males to call females to them. A louder shu-shu-shu call is used when feigning injury by both sexes. Shu-shu-shu is also used by parents with food to call young.

== Diet ==
Orange chats mainly eat invertebrates, small insects (ants, bees, wasps, beetles, caterpillars and grasshoppers) and spiders that are on the ground or in shrubs. Sometimes they will feed with crimson or white-fronted chats, or with flocks of zebra finches. When water is available, feeding will take place along the water's edge, although they are reported to rarely drink water. They walk more often than they hop and are usually seen on or near the ground, occasionally eating seeds. Foraging in crops of sunflowers has been observed.

== Breeding ==
Breeding habits of the orange chat are not well known, as no major studies have been performed. This species moves and breeds opportunistically throughout the year, sometimes three or more times in response to favourable seasons, whilst breeding will not occur in times of drought. Eggs are laid from June to April, but mostly from August to November; young are seen August–November and February–May. There is little variation across its range. The female orange chat will build a small but quite substantial nest in a cup shape, which is located close to the ground in shrubs or herbage, commonly saltbush or samphire. The male will defend both the territory and the female during the construction of the nest. Nesting sometimes occurs among pairs of crimson chats but is often solitary or in loose colonies. The nest is neat and cup-shaped, constructed of dry grass, plant stalks, hair, rootlets, feathers, wool, hair, and twigs. Overall dimensions and average nest size (cm), respectively: external diameter, 8.9 and 8.9; external depth, 6.4 and 5.1; internal diameter, 5.1 and 5.7; internal depth, 2.5 and 3.8. Nests are built in samphire or chenopod shrubland, around salt lakes, and occasionally on grass flats or gibber plains. Nests are usually in samphire, saltbush or bluebush; also canegrass, lignum, grass tussocks, sedges or among thistles. They are usually located on or near the top of a live plant, or near the ground under a nest plant, sheltered from above, or sometimes on the ground. During irruptions, the orange chat nests in a wide variety of shrubs, and there are records of it sometimes nesting in citrus trees. Depending on prevailing conditions, the female lays 3 or 4 whitish oval eggs, which are smooth, close-grained and coloured with brown, red, black and grey spots, especially at the larger end, reminiscent of honeyeaters' eggs. The eggs measure approximately 17 mm × 14 mm (0.67 in × 0.55 in). Both parents help incubate the eggs for around 11 days and feed the young birds once they have hatched until they can fly on their own to find food.

The fledging period is 10 days. For a few days after fledging, the young remain in the nest territory and crouch unmoving under shrubs; after a few days, they will move off with the parents and join local flocks where the young continue to be fed by parents.

=== Predators ===
If a predator approaches the nest either parent will fake an injury to distract the creature away from the nest and will call loudly during the display. Predators include both introduced and native species: cats, snakes, foxes and larger birds, like ravens and crows.
