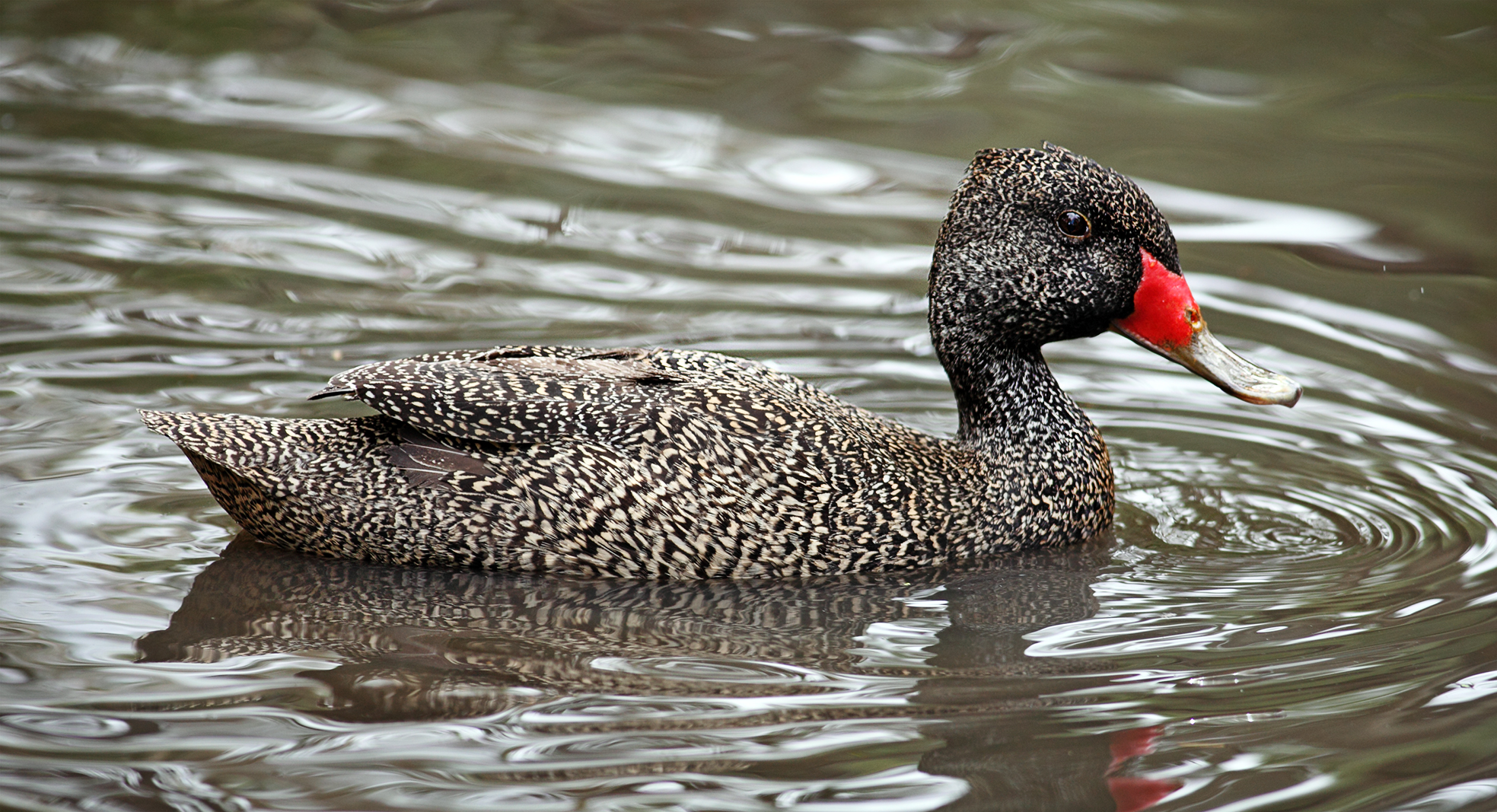
- Male
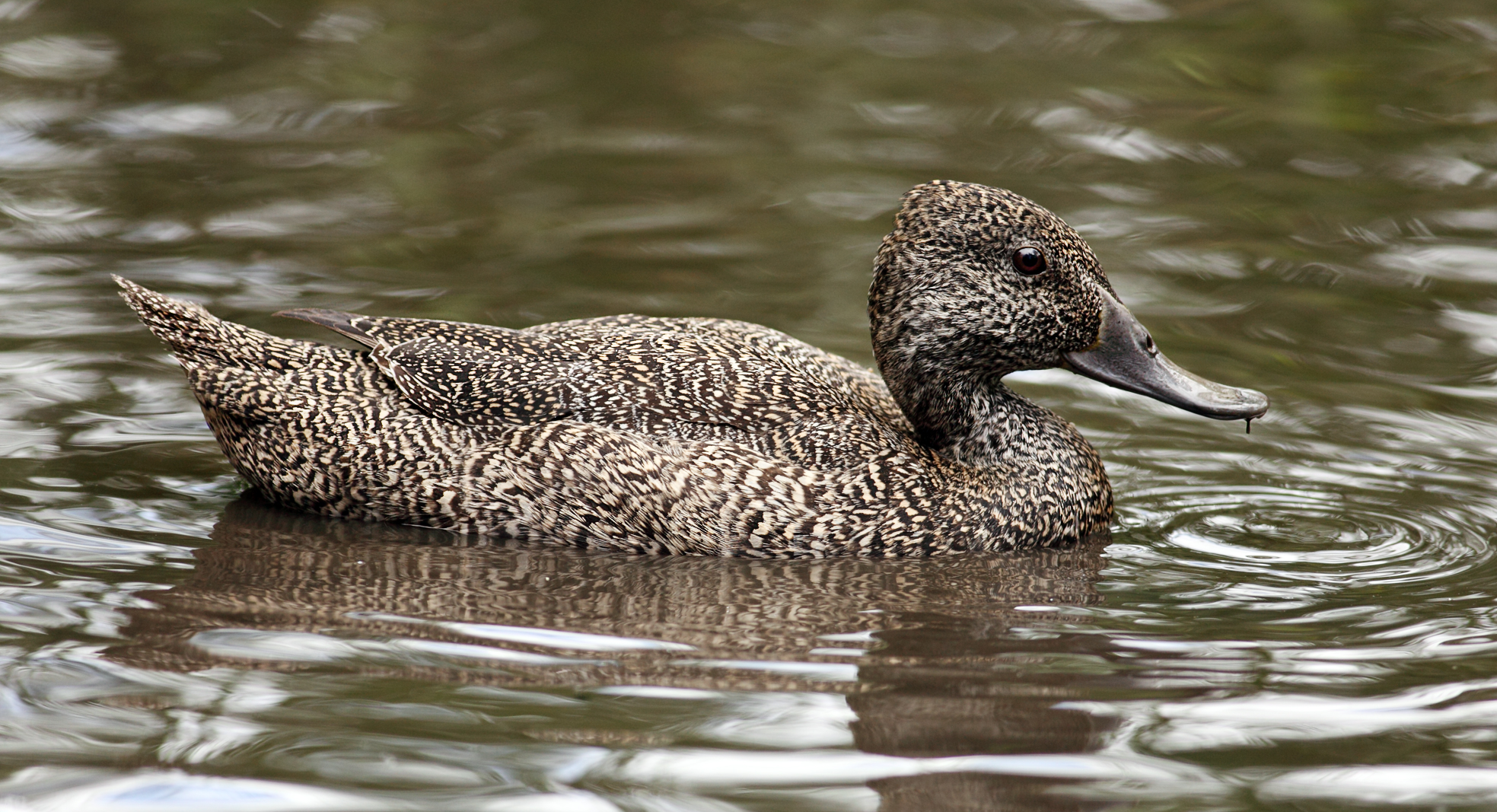
- Female

Conservation status
- Least Concern (IUCN 3.1)

Scientific classification
- Kingdom: Animalia
- Phylum: Chordata
- Class: Aves
- Order: Anseriformes
- Family: Anatidae
- Subfamily: Stictonettinae; Boetticher, 1950
- Genus: Stictonetta; Reichenbach, 1853
- Species: S. naevosa

Binomial name
- Stictonetta naevosa (Gould, 1841)
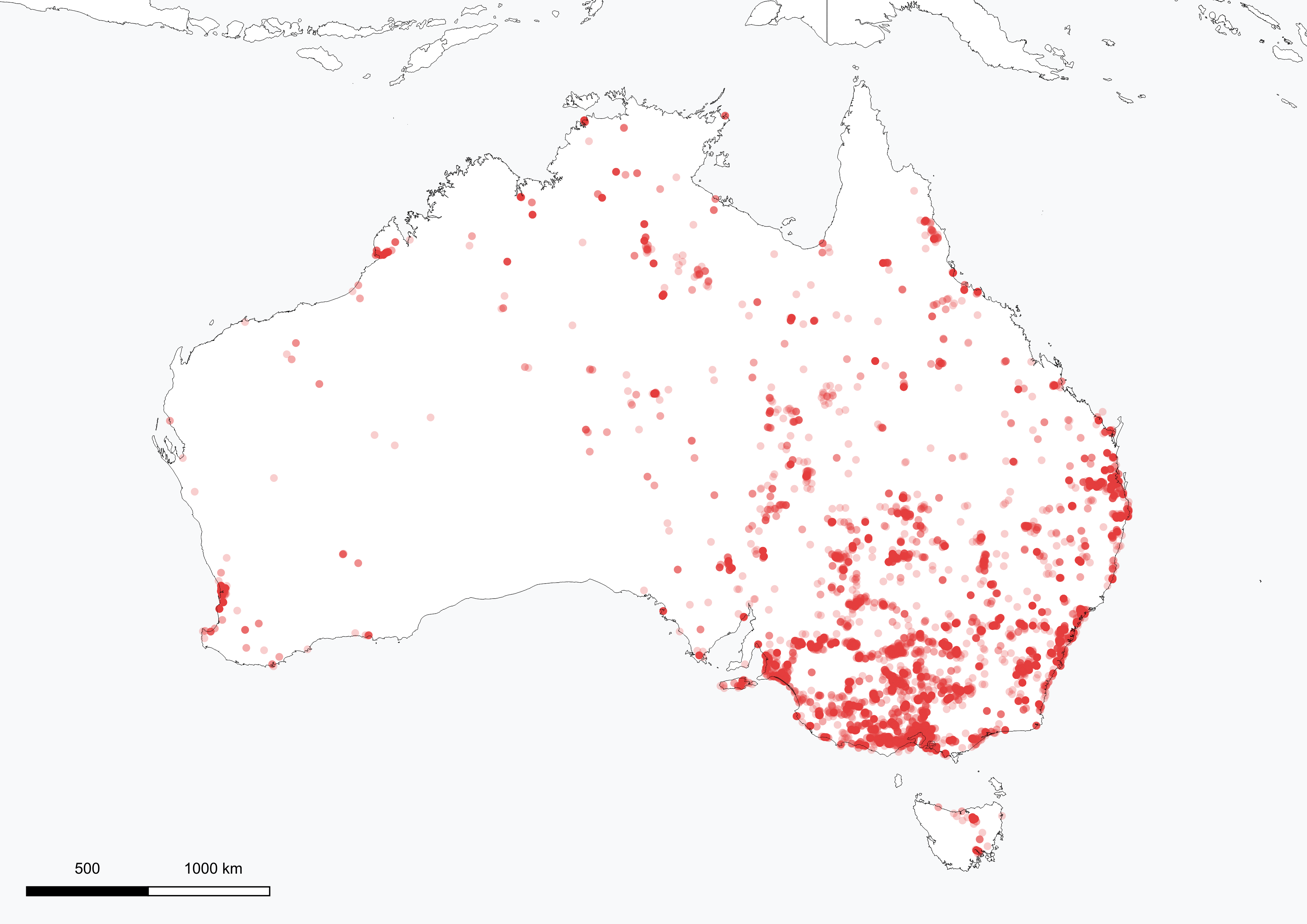
- Species distribution

= Freckled duck =

Species of bird

The freckled duck (Stictonetta naevosa) is a waterfowl species endemic to Australia. The freckled duck has also been referred to as the monkey duck or oatmeal duck. These birds are usually present in mainland Australia, but disperse to coastal and subcoastal wetlands in the dry period. During such times it is common for the freckled duck population to congregate in flocks in the same area, giving the impression that they are more common than they really are.

The freckled duck population is at risk of further reduction from habitat destruction, droughts and game hunting. Often habitat destruction and drought can lead to an increase in hunting, as the freckled duck is forced to disperse into more coastal ranges where they may not be recognised as being a protected species.

In the past few decades, several institutions have established breeding programs to aid in supplementation of the freckled duck population. Such establishments included, but are not restricted to the Hunter Wetlands Centre Australia, Slimbridge Wetlands, Melbourne Zoo, Bronx Zoo, Adelaide Zoo, Healesville Sanctuary, and Tidbinbilla Nature Reserve. The success of these institutes has been variable, with some failing to establish self-maintaining colonies.

== Description ==
The freckled duck has a distinctive appearance. It is characterised, in adults, by dark grey to black plumage covered with small white flecks, which gives the duck the 'freckled' look. The feet, legs and bill of both sexes is of a slate grey colour. Hatchlings and juveniles are distinguished by a uniform light grey plumage, which they lose around their 32nd week when they undergo a full body moult to assume the adult plumage.

The adult freckled duck is sexually dimorphic. On average, males are the larger sex, with average weight between 700 - 1200 g. Females have an only slightly lower range between 600 – 1200 g. Both sexes have a length of 50 – 60 cm. During the breeding season particularly, the males are characterised by the base of their culmen, which takes on various shades of red. Those in prime reproductive condition take on a deep red colouring, while other males may only develop lighter shades of red, or in some instances, no colouring at all. Deep red colouring of the culmen is also associated with dominance, and those with the deepest red are those likely to breed with the females of the group.

== Distribution and habitat ==
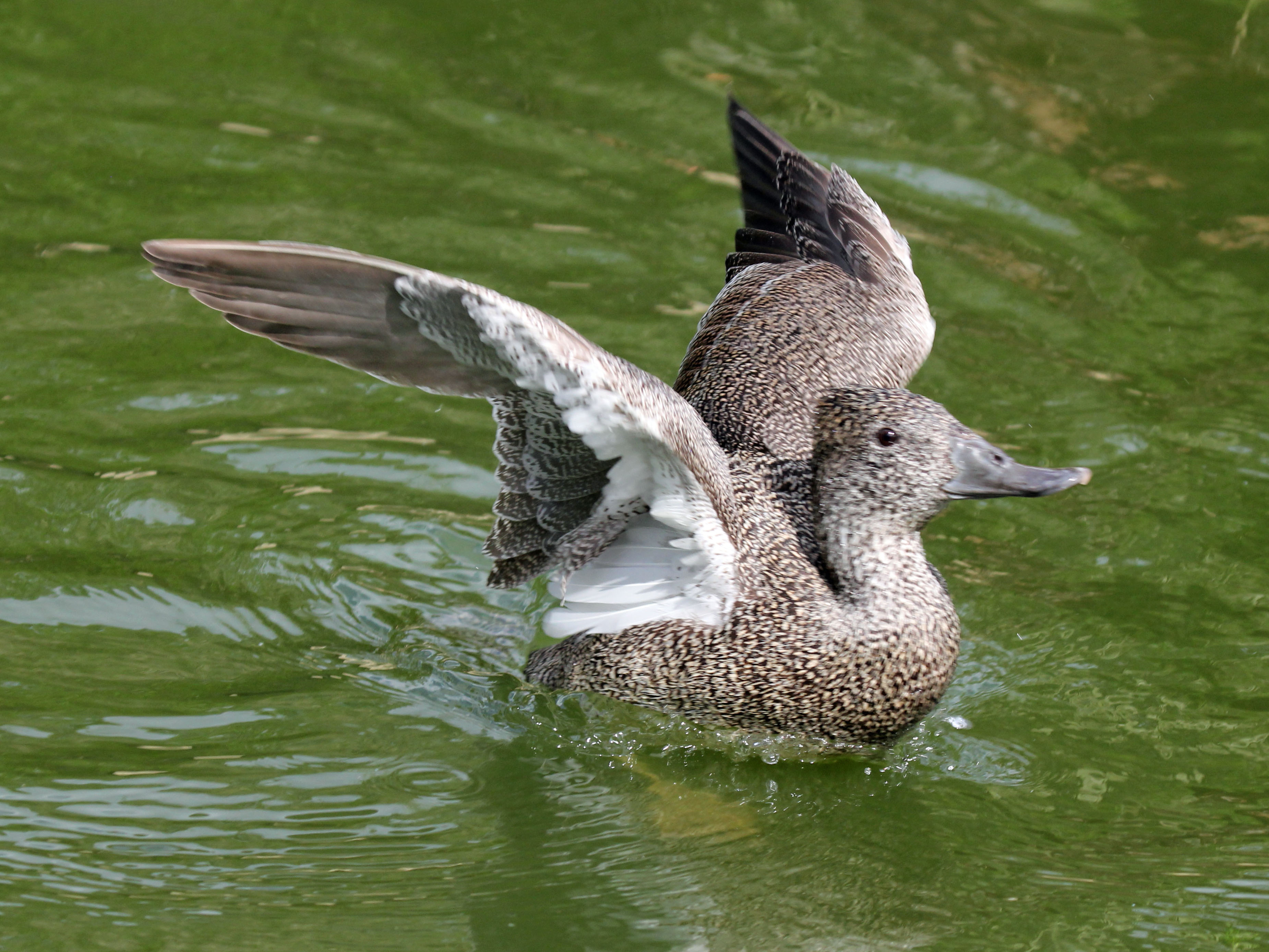
Female at Sylvan Heights Waterfowl Park in Scotland Neck, North Carolina

Endemic to Australia, the freckled duck is mainly situated throughout inland regions of the Eastern section of the country—including New South Wales, Victoria and Queensland. This species also has known populations in South Australia and Western Australia. Due to habitat requirements, distribution of the freckled duck directly correlates to water flow and rainfall in river catchments and wetland systems. Because of this, main populations of this species are located within the Paroo-Warrego catchment (Currawinya Lakes), Eyre-Georgine-Mulligan catchment (Lake Torquinie), and potentially at Lake Galilee. High numbers have also been recorded at the Cooper's Creek catchment, wetlands within the Barkley Tablelands, the Bulloo River catchment and Lake Gregory in central north Western Australia.

Freckled duck habitat preference can be split into two distinct categories: breeding and non-breeding habitat. While this species does not appear to have any sort of distinct migratory pathway or seasonal migration to find suitable breeding habitat. The freckled duck sometimes travels long distances to find a suitable breeding location, and seems to prefer large bodies of fresh water with thick vegetation. Usual contenders are recently flooded wetland systems and swamps. After breeding, the freckled duck disperses to more coastal areas with more permanent bodies of water such as lakes, reservoirs, and ponds. These areas are often more exposed and contain little vegetation.

== Ecology ==
=== Diet ===
The diet of the freckled duck has been subjected to a degree of controversy and disagreement over the years, potentially due to the versatile diet of different populations and distributions of this duck. Despite this, it is widely agreed that the freckled duck is a resilient, specialist filter feeder that consumes a range of aquatic vegetation, insects, algae, larvae and crustaceans. Studies have found that the freckled duck prefers to feed in shallow water, using its bill to strain food particles from the mud or sand.

=== Social behaviour ===
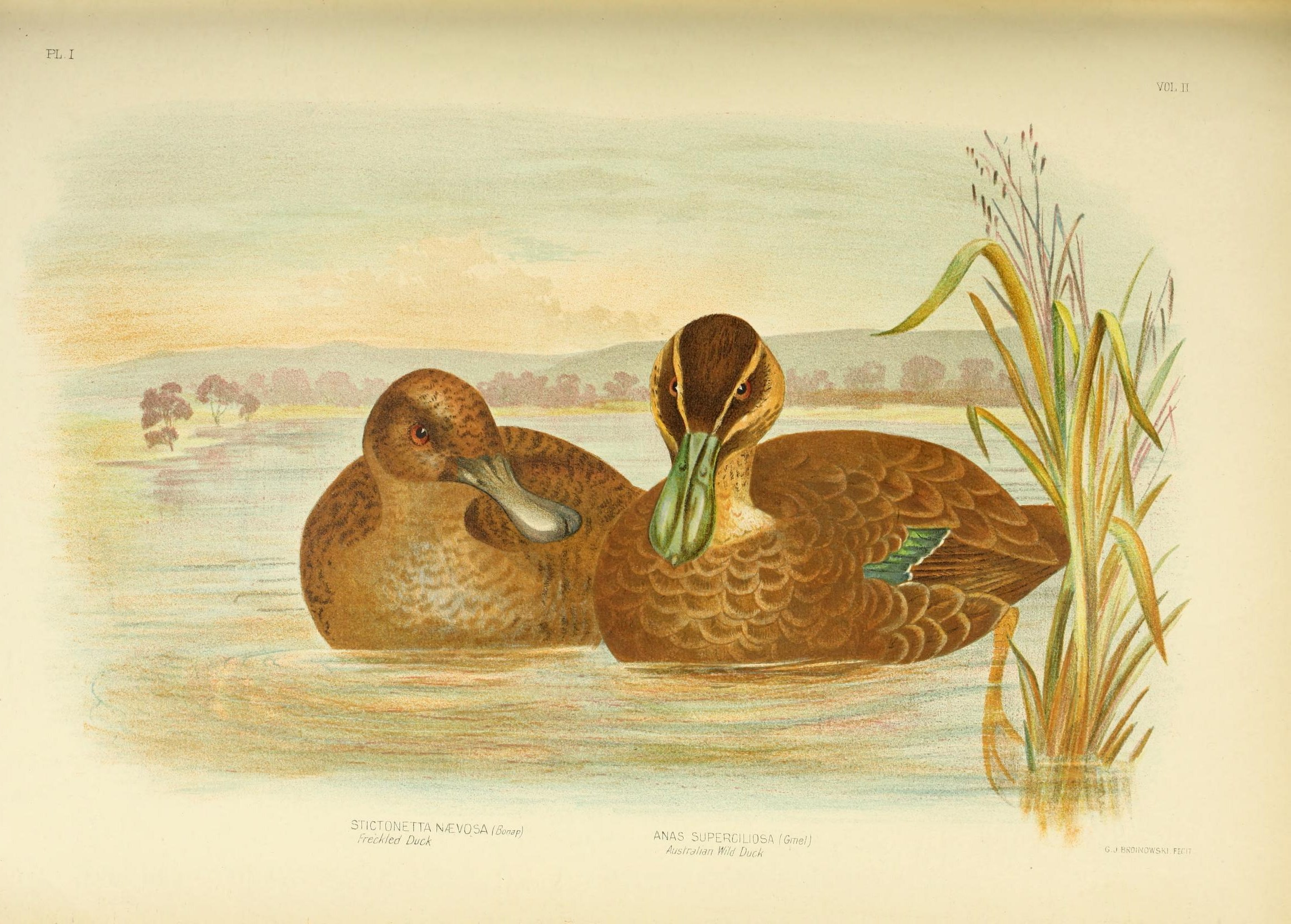
Illustration from The Birds of Australia (1890) (with Pacific black duck)

A highly gregarious species, the freckled duck is known to have flock sizes ranging from 10 to 100 individuals, especially outside of breeding season. During breeding season, these flocks often break up into smaller sub-units, scattered throughout wetland and swamp systems.

Despite these large flock sizes, this species is lacking in demonstrative displays towards one another, with only cryptic gestures and few interactions towards fellow flock mates. The rare interaction that is observed within this species is usually of a quarrelsome nature.

=== Bathing ===
While there has been little research into the bathing behaviour of the freckled duck, it is known that a body of water (e.g. a swamp or dam) is essential for many natural behaviours such as feeding, mating and bathing. Freckled ducks have been observed preening both within water and after emerging from water while in a roosting position. There is no evidence that the freckled duck dust bathes or requires any other substrate for bathing.

=== Reproductive behaviour ===
The freckled duck is a polygamous species that undertakes short term, seasonal monogamous pairings in the wild. In this short term pairing, the male defends the receptive female during the pre-egg laying stage of the breeding season. During this time, the male also helps construct and defend the nest site—but leaves before the female lays her clutch, and plays no further role in rearing or defending his offspring.

The freckled duck has few pre or post copulatory behaviours. Copulation occurs in the water with the male approaching a receptive female, who adopts a semi-submerged orientation, with her head stretched outwards and tail raised. The male then mounts the female and clutches the feathers on the lower neck of the female during copulation. After dismounting, both sexes display bathing and preening behaviours.

The breeding season of the freckled duck is basically regular, with a generic breeding season between September and December. However, it retains the ability to breed out of season. Breeding out of season highly correlates with periods of heavy rainfall and flooding.

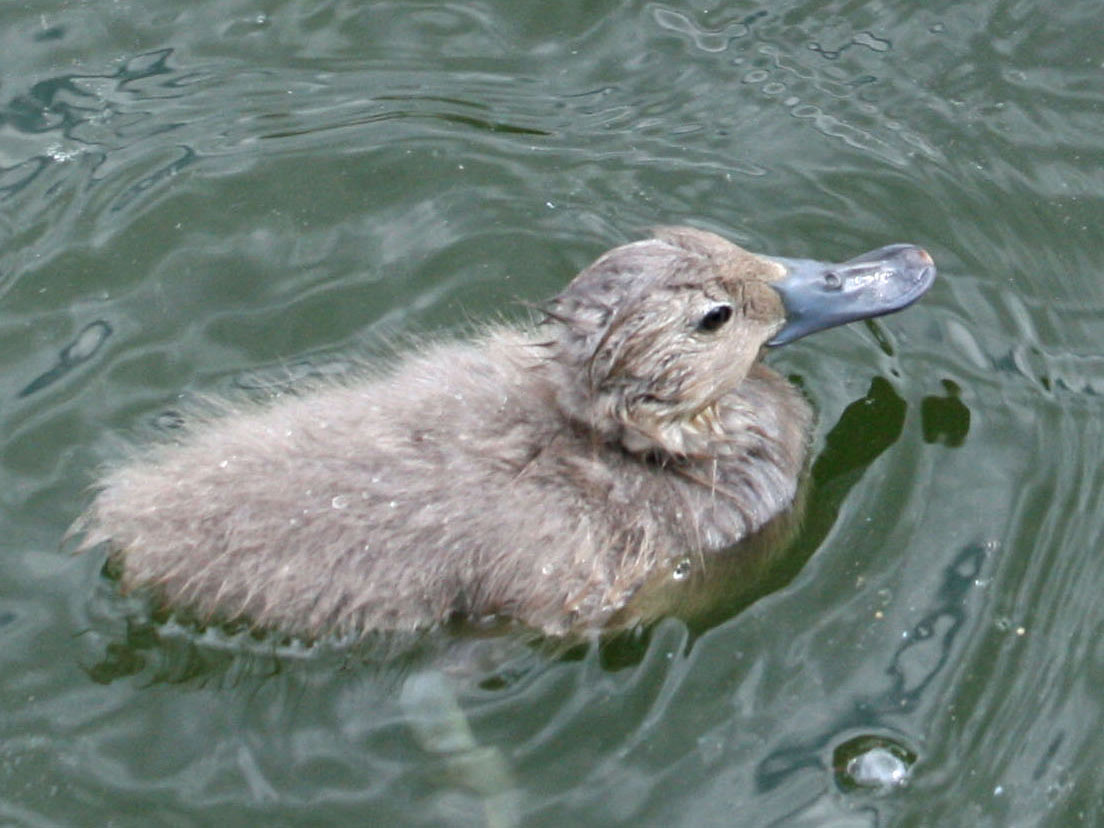
Chick at Sylvan Heights Waterfowl Park in Scotland Neck, North Carolina

Both male and female freckled ducks reach sexual maturity at around 12 months of ages when the first breeding occurrence can commence. The freckled duck has been known to continue breeding annually throughout their life, with records suggesting successful breeding in birds in excess to 10 years of age.

The freckled duck has a standard incubation period of between 26 and 28 days, though some sources have recorded incubation periods of up to 35 days. The female is solely responsible for egg incubation and only leaves the eggs for short periods to feed.

The average clutch is seven eggs, but can range between four and 14 eggs. Clutches of up to 14 eggs can occur naturally, though this occurrence mainly appears to be the result of females 'dumping' additional eggs into another female's nest. This occurrence is common within freckled duck populations as it enables the offending females to pass on their genetic material while not expending energy to raise their hatchlings.

The eggs of the freckled duck are glossy, smooth and almost perfectly oval in shape. They are white in colour, ranging from shades of cream to ivory. The freckled duck egg is unique, having an exceptionally thick but soft shell unlike that of any other species. Egg measurements usually fall between 60-65mm by 45-48mm and weigh an average of 66g.

Freckled duck hatchlings are precocial, meaning they hatch fully functional and able to feed themselves. Despite this, they still need their mother for the best chance of survival. Apart from protection, the hatchlings need the mother to teach them important social cues and behaviours.

The ducklings fledge late compared with other waterfowl species, at nine weeks, when they no longer need their mother's protection. At this point, the mother and fledglings are likely to re-join a larger flock.(Flinchum, 2005)

== In captivity ==
Historically, the freckled duck has been kept with limited success in captivity and ironing out the issues with captive life is still an ongoing issue. Issues with stress, breeding and mortality rates of chicks are amongst the biggest issues with keeping these ducks in captive environments. In recent years some of these concerns have been mitigated with establishments such as the Hunter Wetlands Australia and Slimbridge Wetlands UK implementing successful breeding programs, with chicks surviving to adulthood.

The freckled duck is a highly compatible species, with various establishments holding this species in groups of various sizes, sex ratios and species with no interspecific or intraspecific aggression. However, there has been limited success with breeding programs when housed in mixed exhibits.

Behavioural considerations are another consideration to take into account when holding a captive population of freckled ducks. The most important of these considerations is the possibility of imprinting on a subject other than the mother. Imprinting is an instinctual phenomenon that occurs early on in life whereby the juvenile establishes a long lasting behavioural response to the parent (or another animal, person or thing that is present during the crucial imprinting period). Imprinting on human keepers is a serious consideration, as hatchlings require the mother to learn important behaviour traits—including vocalisations, feeding, and other important attributes.

== Conservation ==
The species is currently classified as Least Concern by the IUCN. Population numbers show no definite trend, but appear to be fluctuating quite strongly, with an assessment in 2016 of 7,300 - 17,000 mature individuals. Threats include misidentification of this protected species as a game bird and consequent shooting by hunters. The ongoing destruction of swamp habitat by water diversion schemes is thought to have the capacity to result in a population decline of up to 20% within the next 15 years.
