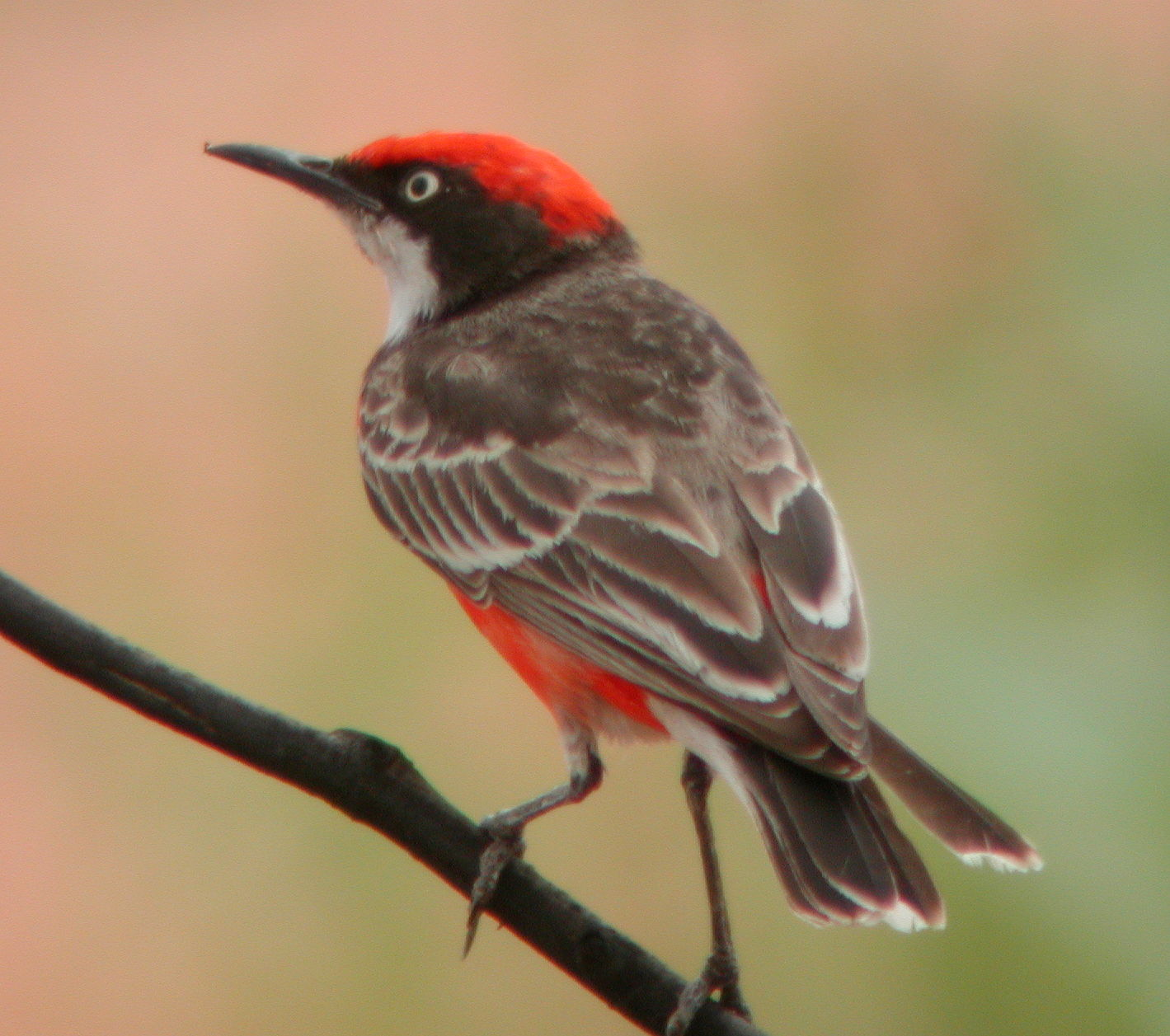
- Crimson chat (Epthianura tricolor)

Scientific classification
- Kingdom: Animalia
- Phylum: Chordata
- Class: Aves
- Order: Passeriformes
- Superfamily: Meliphagoidea
- Family: Meliphagidae
- Genus: Epthianura; Gould, 1838

Type species
- Acanthiza albifrons Jardine & Selby, 1828

= Epthianura =

Genus of birds

Epthianura is a genus of bird also known as the Australian chats. Along with the gibberbird in the genus Ashbyia they were once thought to constitute a separate family, the Epthianuridae, although most taxonomists today treat them as a subfamily, Epthianurinae, of the honeyeater family Meliphagidae.

== Distribution, habitat and movements ==
The genus Epthianura is endemic to the continent of Australia, where they are widely distributed across the mainland and, in the case of the white-fronted chat, Tasmania. With the exception of that species they are generally distributed in the central part of Australia; the white-fronted chat being the most coastal species. The Australian chats have adapted to a wide range of habitat types in the interior of Australia, though they generally are found in more shrubby environments than wooded ones and are also seldom found in high altitudes. They are particularly adapted to arid environments, but also frequent riparian woodlands, temporary and permanent wetlands, herblands, and even human modified farmlands.

There are large gaps in the knowledge of the migratory movements of the Australian chats. Some species are apparently nomadic, at least over parts of their range, and others migratory, but the difficulty in reaching and surveying much of their habitat (and the avoidance of the centre of Australia during the height of summer by many observers) means that complete picture of these movements has not yet been obtained. It is also apparent that many of these movements are not only seasonal but dependent on weather conditions, birds may be common in one locality in some years but not in others. This nomadism allows them to make use of unpredictable rainfall in the arid deserts.

== Description ==
The Australian chats are small honeyeaters adapted to a highly terrestrial existence. The bill is short and slender, and overall they are slightly more rotund than the honeyeaters. In common with the rest of the honeyeaters they have a brush-tipped tongue. The plumage of the genus is sexually dimorphic, with the males having bright (or in the case of the white-fronted chat, striking) colours. The breast and cap of the crimson chat is bright crimson as the name suggests, and the back is dark grey with a white throat. In contrast the female lacks any crimson except on her rump. The male orange and yellow chats have bright yellow/gold plumage, whereas the females are much duller grey. The most unusual species is the white-fronted chat, which in the male has a striking black back and chest band and a white face and belly. The yellow and crimson chats are unusual amongst the honeyeaters in having seasonal differences in plumage, particularly in the males, which are much duller in the non-breeding season.

== Behaviour ==
The Australian chats are predominantly terrestrial birds. While they will make use of low shrubs, they are seldom seen in the upper levels of trees. They are conspicuous birds, particular the brightly coloured males, and generally unconcerned by human activity, although they are more circumspect in the breeding season around the nest. They generally occur in pairs or small groups, but will form larger flocks during the non-breeding season.

== Species ==
Genus Epthianura – Gould, 1838 – four species
Common name	Scientific name and subspecies	Range	Size and ecology	IUCN status and estimated population
White-fronted chat Male Female	Epthianura albifrons (Jardine & Selby, 1828)	southern Australia.	Size: Habitat: Diet:	LC
Orange chat	Epthianura aurifrons (Gould, 1838)	Australia.	Size: Habitat: Diet:	LC
Yellow chat	Epthianura crocea Castelnau & Ramsay, 1877 Three subspecies: E. c. crocea; E. c. tunneyi; E. c. macgregori	northern Australia	Size: Habitat: Diet:	LC
Crimson chat Male Female	Epthianura tricolor Gould, 1841	Australia from the west coast to the Great Dividing Range	Size: Habitat: Diet:	LC
