= List of ambassadors of Australia to Mexico =

Ambassador of Australia to Mexico

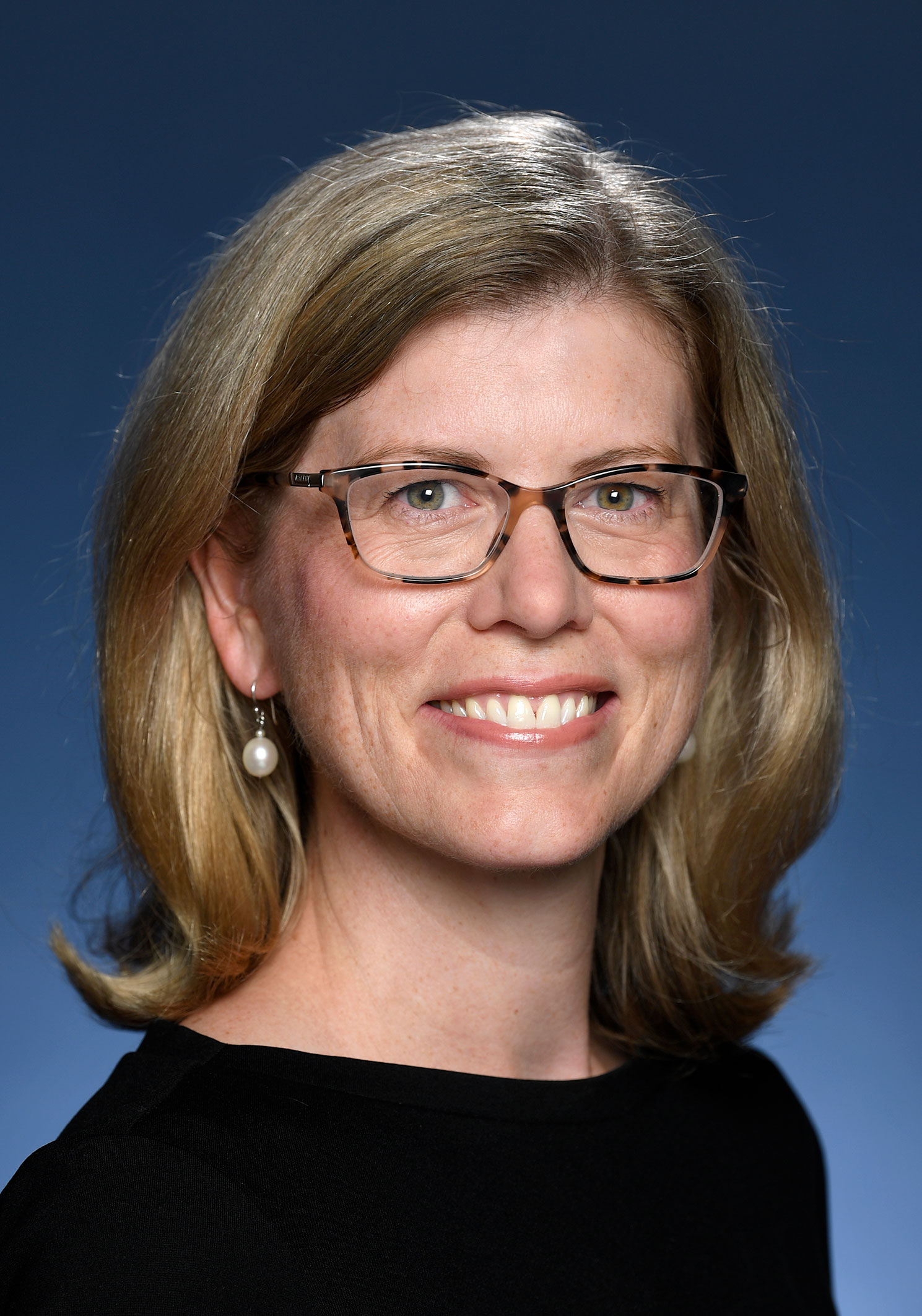
- Incumbent; Rachel Moseley since 24 August 2023
- Department of Foreign Affairs and Trade
- Style: Her Excellency
- Reports to: Minister for Foreign Affairs
- Residence: Mexico City
- Nominator: Prime Minister of Australia
- Appointer: Governor General of Australia
- Formation: January 1967

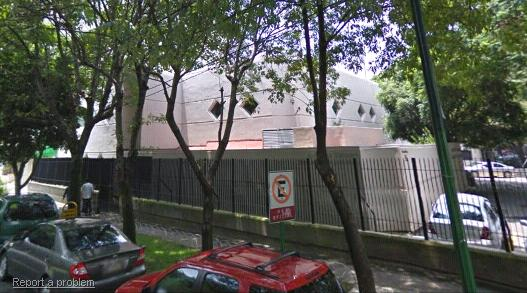
The Australian Embassy in Mexico City.

The Ambassador of Australia to Mexico is an officer of the Australian Department of Foreign Affairs and Trade and the head of the Embassy of the Commonwealth of Australia to the United Mexican States. Mexico and Australia established diplomatic relations on 14 March 1966. The Australian Government opened the Australian Embassy in Mexico City in 1967 in an effort to strengthen its contacts with Latin America.

As of 2023, the Australian Ambassador to Mexico is also Non Resident Ambassador to Costa Rica, Cuba, El Salvador, Guatemala, Honduras, Nicaragua, Panama and the Dominican Republic, in addition to being Resident Ambassador to Mexico.

The current ambassador, since August 2023, is Rachel Moseley.

== List of ambassadors ==
Ordinal	Officeholder	Term start date	Term end date	Time in office	Notes
1	Dudley McCarthy	1967	1972	4–5 years	
2	Owen Davis	1972	1975	2–3 years	
3	Allan Eastman	1975	1977	1–2 years	
4	Kenneth Rogers	1977	1980	2–3 years	
5	Kevin Gates	1980	1983	2–3 years	
6	Cavan Hogue	1983	1985	1–2 years	
7	John McCarthy	1985	1987	1–2 years	
8	Bill Farmer	1987	1990	2–3 years	
9	Keith Baker	1990	1994	3–4 years	
10	Richard Broinowski	1994	1997	2–3 years	
11	Robert Hamilton	1997	2002	4–5 years	
12	Graeme Wilson	2002	2005	2–3 years	
13	Neil Mules	2005	2008	2–3 years	
14	Katrina Cooper	2008	2012	3–4 years	
15	Tim George	2012	2015	2–3 years	
16	Dr David Engel	December 2015	2019	3–4 years	
17	Remo Moretta	22 February 2020	2023	2–3 years	
18	Rachel Moseley	24 August 2023	incumbent	3 years, 14 days	

== See also ==
- Australia–Mexico relations
