= Australia–Mexico relations =

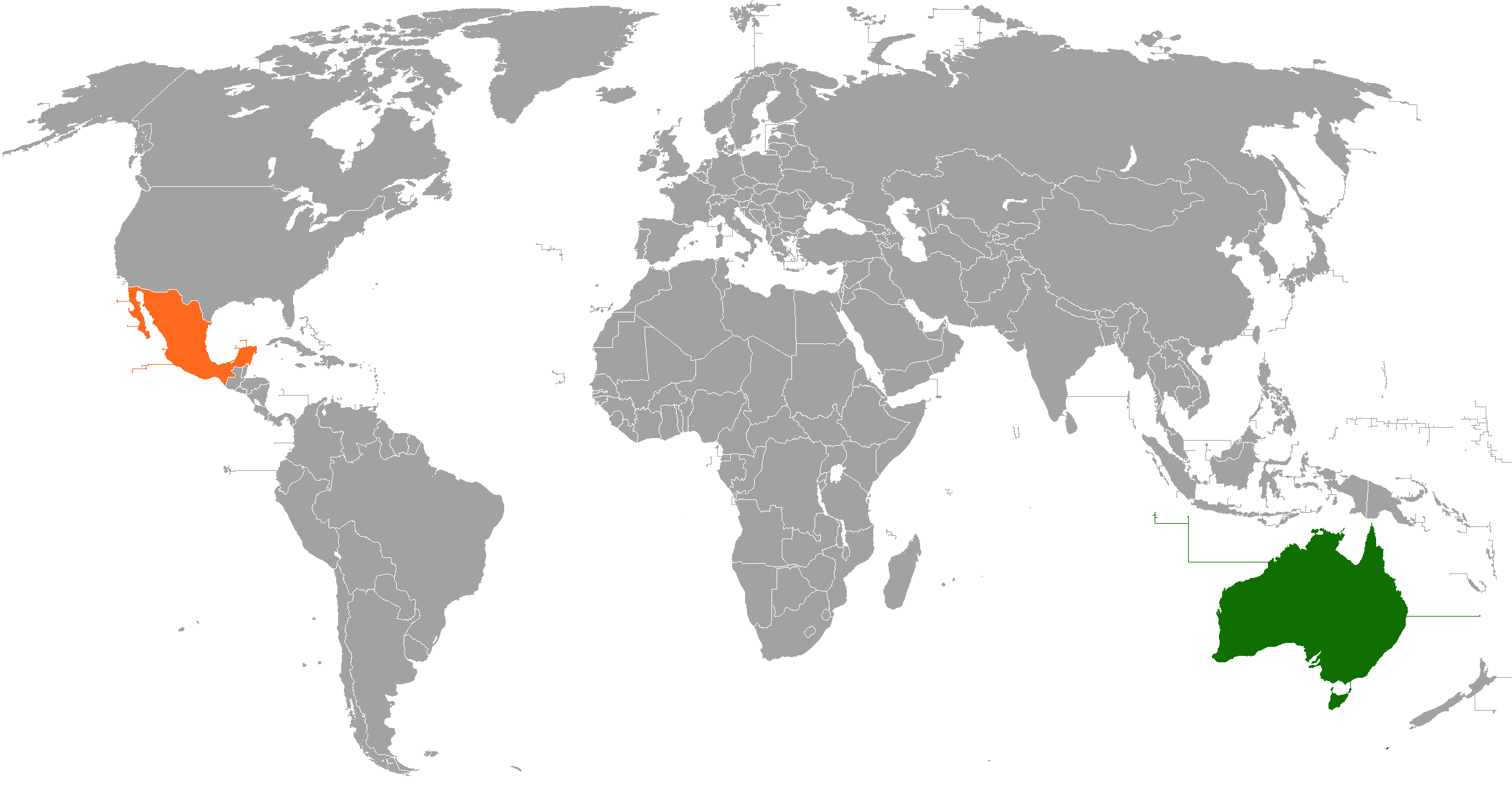

- Australia: Mexico

The nations of Australia and Mexico established diplomatic relations in 1966. Both nations are members of the Asia-Pacific Economic Cooperation, Comprehensive and Progressive Agreement for Trans-Pacific Partnership, G20, MIKTA, Organisation for Economic Co-operation and Development and the World Trade Organization. Mexico is Australia's main trading partner in Latin America.

== History ==
In the beginning, diplomatic relations between Mexico and Australia were conducted via London as Australia was part of the British Empire. In the late 1930s, Mexico established an honorary consulate in Sydney; however during the outbreak of World War II, Mexico closed its consulate. Both Australian and Mexican troops fought together in Philippines Campaign during the war to liberate the country from Japanese forces. In 1960, Mexico re-opened its consulate in Sydney which led to formal diplomatic relations being established between the two nations on 14 March 1966. That same year, Mexico opened an embassy in Canberra and in 1982, Mexico inaugurated its current embassy building in Yarralumla.

In 1973, Prime Minister Gough Whitlam became the first Australian head-of-government to pay an official visit to Mexico. During the visit, Whitlam emphasized that "middle powers like Mexico and Australia should associate more often and openly in helping to shape a world whose future belonged to them as much as to the mightiest powers." In 1990, Carlos Salinas de Gortari became the first Mexican President to visit Australia. Since the initial visits, leaders of both nations have returned to each nation.

In September 2007, Mexican President Felipe Calderon paid a visit to Sydney to attend the XV APEC Summit. In June 2012, Australian Prime Minister Julia Gillard paid a visit to Mexico to attend the VII G20 Summit in Los Cabos.

In 2016, both nations celebrated 50 years of diplomatic relations. In August of that same year, Australian Governor-General Peter Cosgrove paid a visit to Mexico and met with President Enrique Peña Nieto to celebrate the 50th anniversary of diplomatic relations between both nations.

In January 2020, a Mexican Parliamentary delegation paid a visit to Canberra, Australia. In April 2023, Director General for Asia-Pacific of the Mexican Secretariat of Foreign Affairs, Fernando González Saiffe, paid a visit to Australia for senior officials talks.

== High-level visits ==
Australian Prime Minister Malcolm Turnbull with Mexican President Enrique Peña Nieto in the Philippines; November 2015.

High-level visits from Australia to Mexico

- Prime Minister Gough Whitlam (1973)
- Prime Minister Malcolm Fraser (1981)
- Prime Minister John Howard (2002)
- Prime Minister Julia Gillard (2012)
- Governor-General Peter Cosgrove (2016)

High-level visits from Mexico to Australia

- President Carlos Salinas de Gortari (1990)
- President Felipe Calderón (2007)
- President Enrique Peña Nieto (2014)

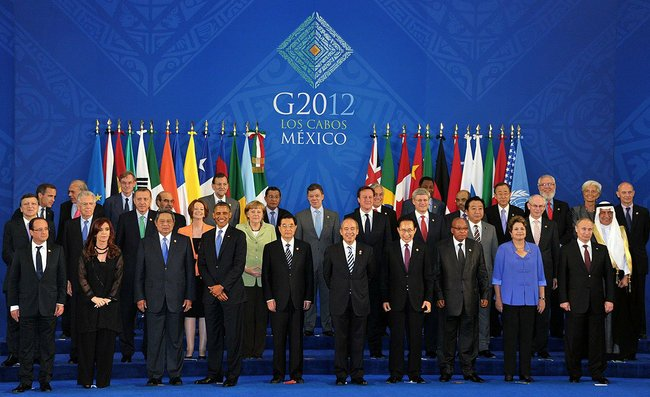
Prime Minister Julia Gillard and President Felipe Calderón attending the G20 summit in Los Cabos; 2012

Prime Minister Tony Abbott and President Enrique Peña Nieto in Beijing, China; November 2014

== Agreements ==
Both nations have signed several bilateral agreements such as an Agreement on Technical and Scientific Cooperation (1981); Extradition Treaty (1990); Agreement on Cooperation in the peaceful uses of Nuclear Energy (1992); Agreement on the avoidance of Double-Taxation (2002); Agreement on the Promotion and Protection of Investments (2005); Agreement on Energy (2005); Agreement on Education (2008); Agreement on Air Services (2010); Agreement on Agriculture (2010); Agreement on Mining (2010); Memorandum of understanding on education, research and vocational training (2015); Memorandum of understanding on scientific cooperation between the Academy of Mexican Sciences and the Academy of Sciences of Australia (2015); Memorandum of understanding between the Mexican Secretariat of the Interior and the Australian Federal Police on the development of police cooperation (2018); and a Memorandum of Understanding between the Australian Institute of Studies on Aboriginal Peoples and Islanders of the Torres Strait and the Mexican National Institute for Indigenous Peoples (2020).

== Tourism ==
Mexican Navy training ship, the ARM Cuauhtémoc, in Fremantle, Australia

In 2023, approximately 9,432 Australian citizens visited Mexico for tourism. At the same time, approximately 7,787 Mexican citizens visited Australia.

== Trade ==
In 2018, both nations became signatories of the Comprehensive and Progressive Agreement for Trans-Pacific Partnership which grants both nations free trade with each other and other members of the Trans-Pacific Partnership. In 2023, two-way trade between both nations amounted to US$2.5 billion. Australia's main exports to Mexico include: turnip Seeds (canola) or rapeseed oil, products of iron or non-alloy steel, machinery, mechanical appliances, parts and accessories for motor vehicles, chemical based products, minerales, beef and sheep meat, margarine, and wine. Mexico's main exports to Australia include: motor cars and other vehicles for the transport of people and goods, telephones and mobile phones, data processing machines, chemical based products, medical appliances, tubes and pipes of iron or steel, coffee, vegetables, milk, seafood, and alcohol.

Australian multi-national companies such as Chep, Incitec Pivot, Macquarie Capital, Nufarm, QBE Insurance, Worley (among others) operate in Mexico. Mexican multinational companies such as Gruma and Metalsa (among others) operate in Australia.

== Drug trafficking ==
It has been reported that the Sinaloa Cartel had operatives in Australia and were behind a number of significant cocaine hauls intercepted by Australian authorities. In 2011, the Sinaloa cartel attempted to set up an outpost in Sydney but were thwarted by a police operation. However, in 2016 it was reported that the Sinaloa cartel was responsible for 60% of the cocaine market in Australia and shipped AUD100 million worth a month.

In 2014, it was reported that "Violent Mexican cartels with links to Australian crime gangs are infiltrating the nation's illicit drug trade." The chief of the Australian Crime Commission said "Recently, we've seen the emergence of Mexican cartel activity within Australia." The Crime Commission also noted "Mexican criminals have become more prevalent as principals in the importation and supply of cocaine and associated money laundering" in Australia.

In May 2015, the United Nations Office on Drugs and Crime warned that Mexican drug cartels were targeting criminals in Australia to import ice into the country. The Office said cartels were involved in trafficking methamphetamine and were actively seeking partners in Australia.

In 2016, the Australian Federal Police reported that a "significant amount of methamphetamine coming into Australia may originate in Mexico." A report by the University of Canberra found that the cartels "have already established linkages in the Asia-Pacific and are attempting to expand these with a particular focus on penetrating the Australian market."

== Resident diplomatic missions ==
- Australia has an embassy in Mexico City.
- Mexico has an embassy in Canberra.

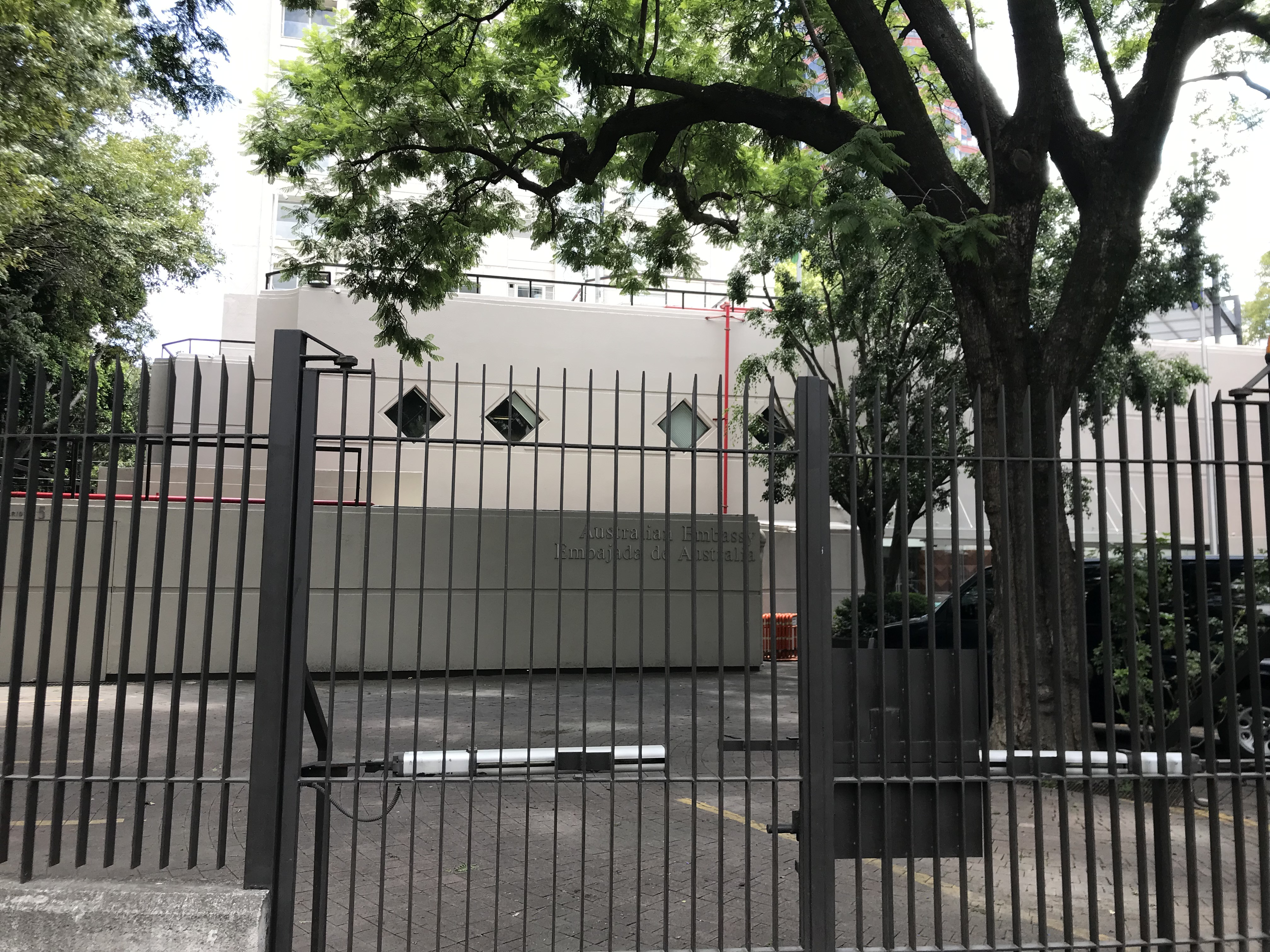
Embassy of Australia in Mexico City

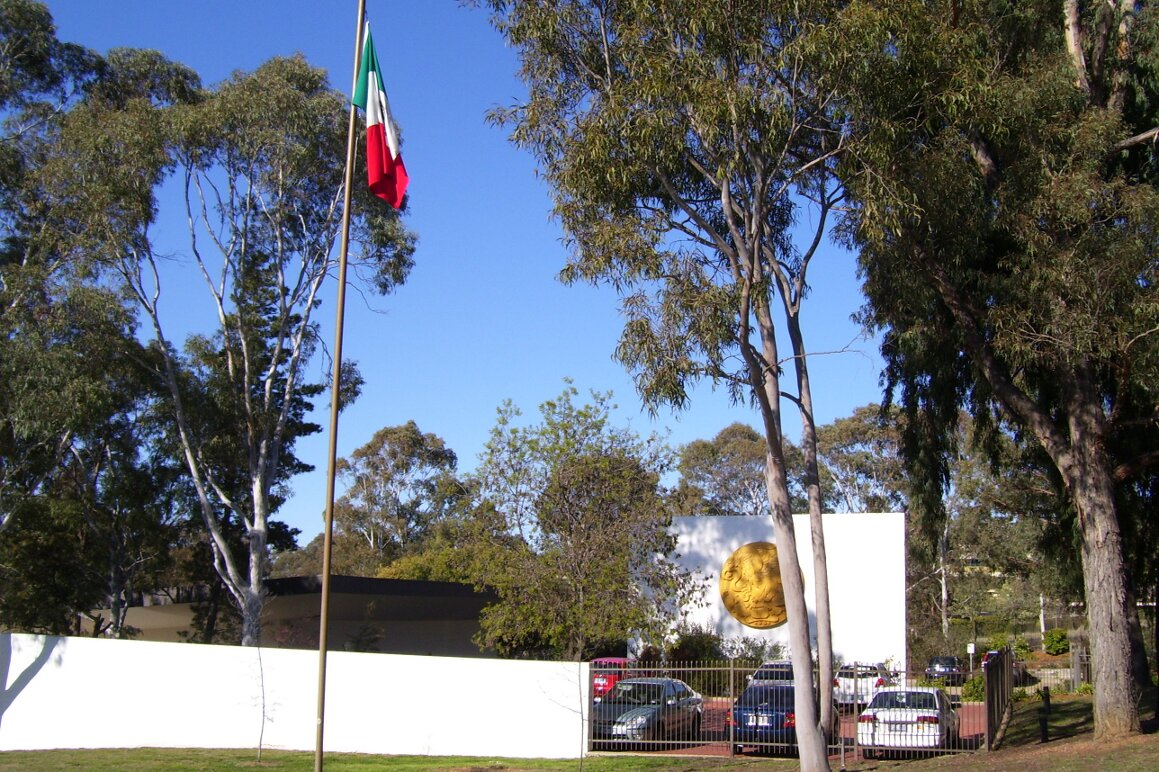
Embassy of Mexico in Canberra

== See also ==
- List of ambassadors of Australia to Mexico
