= Leopold Broinowski =

Leopold Thomas Broinowski (28 June 1871 – 26 September 1937) was an Australian political journalist.

Broinowski was born in Carlton to ornithologist and artist Gracius Joseph Broinowski and Jane, née Smith. The family moved to Sydney in 1880, where Leopold attended St Ignatius' College, Riverview. He began an arts degree at the University of Sydney in 1889. Broinoswski graduated with a Bachelor of Arts in 1897, after spending time as a teacher at Newington College and helping on his father's Campbelltown farm. A strong proponent of Federation, he abandoned his law degree in 1898, to become Edmund Barton's secretary during the Federation referendums. He subsequently became a journalist, writing for the Goulburn Evening Penny Post before moving to Hobart to work for the Mercury, of which he became associate editor in 1904. In 1908 he married Annie Coverdale Sorell, with whom he had two children.

Broinowski contested the Australian House of Representatives at the 1922 federal election, running unsuccessfully as one of three endorsed Nationalists in Denison. His early support for federation was tempered by a strong states' rights campaign; his slogan was "Tasmania First". Following his defeat he became a returned servicemen's advocate; given the Certificate of Merit by the Returned Sailors' and Soldiers' Imperial League of Australia, he edited Tasmania's War Record 1914–18. As a political reporter he had a sizeable impact on Tasmanian politics and was generally respected across the political spectrum despite his clear conservative leanings. He died from cerebrovascular disease in Hobart in 1937.
