= Gracius Broinowski =

Australian ornithologist and artist

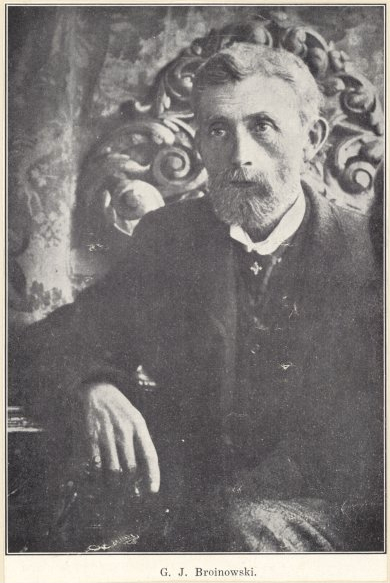
- Born: 7 March 1837; Walichnowy, Congress Poland, Russian Empire
- Died: 11 April 1913 (aged 76); Mosman, New South Wales, Australia
- Notable work: The Birds and Mammals of Australia; The Cockatoos and Nestors of Australia and New Zealand (1888); The Birds of Australia (1891)
- Spouse: Jane Smith
- Relatives: Leopold Broinowski (son); Robert Broinowski (son)

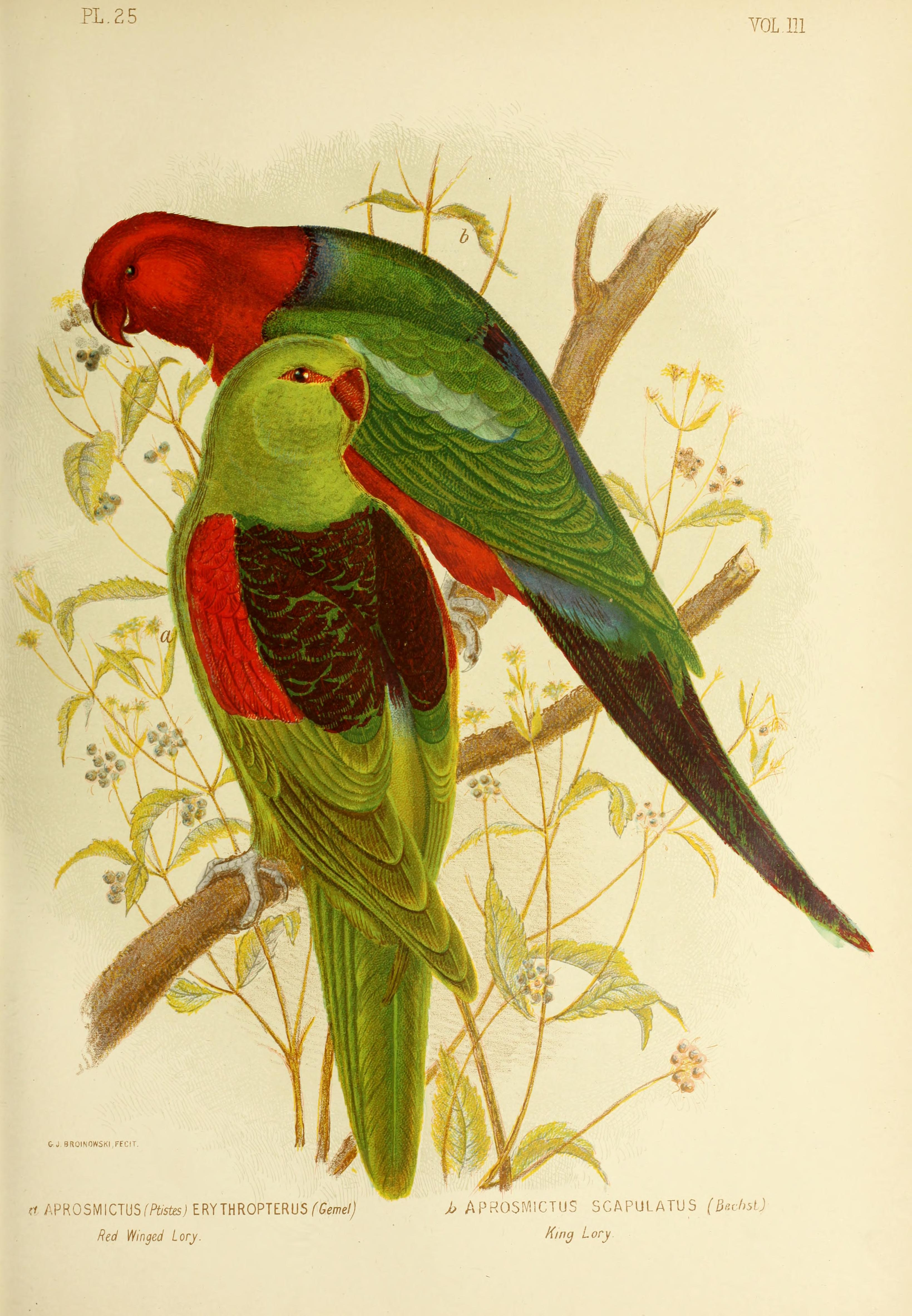
Plate illustration from "The Birds of Australia", Gracius Broinowski 1890.

Gracius Joseph Broinowski (7 March 1837 – 11 April 1913) was a Polish-Australian artist and ornithologist. He was born at the village of Walichnowy in central Poland, the son of a landowner and military officer. He studied languages, classics and art at the Ludwig-Maximilians-Universität München. In about 1857, he joined the crew of a windjammer bound for Australia, leaving the ship at Portland, Victoria.

Broinowski spent the next few years doing various jobs, including working for a publisher in Melbourne, selling and promoting his paintings, and travelling widely in eastern Australia. He married Jane Smith, the daughter of a whaling captain, in about 1863. In 1880, he settled in Sydney, teaching painting, lecturing on art and holding exhibitions of his own work.

In the 1880s, he began to publish illustrated works on Australian natural history. First came "The Birds and Mammals of Australia", followed in 1888 by "The Cockatoos and Nestors of Australia and New Zealand", and "The Birds of Australia" in 1891.

Broinowski died at Mosman in Sydney, survived by his wife, six sons and a daughter. His son Leopold became a significant political journalist in Tasmania, while another son Robert was clerk of the Australian Senate. A great-grandson, Richard Broinowski was an Australian public servant and diplomat.
