= Alison Broinowski =

Australian politician

Alison Elizabeth Broinowski
- Born: Alison Woodroffe; 25 October 1941 (age 84); Adelaide, South Australia
- Education: University of Adelaide
- Occupations: Academic, journalist, writer
- Political party: The Wikileaks Party
- Spouse: Richard Broinowski (m. 1963)
- Children: Anna Broinowski; Adam Broinowski

Alison Elizabeth Broinowski, AM (née Woodroffe; born 25 October 1941) is an Australian academic, journalist, writer and former Australian public servant.

== Biography ==
Alison Woodroffe was born in Adelaide, South Australia, on 25 October 1941. She attended the Wilderness School from 1946 to 1958, and in 1962 she graduated with a Bachelor of Arts degree from the University of Adelaide. In December 1963, she married diplomat Richard Philip Broinowski. From 1963 to 1964, she was a cadet for the Australian Department of External Affairs before beginning her extensive public service career, including various diplomatic postings, with the Department of Foreign Affairs (DFAT).

Broinowski ran in New South Wales as a Senate candidate for The Wikileaks Party at the 2013 Australian federal election. Broinowski was appointed a Member of the Order of Australia in the 2019 Australia Day Honours in recognition of her "significant service to international relations as an academic, author, and diplomat".

== Career ==
- 1965–68 – Freelance journalist in Japan
- 1969 – Journalist and leader-writer for the Canberra Times
- 1970–74 – Department of Foreign Affairs, Japan Section
- 1975–78 – Second Secretary at the Australian Embassy in Manila, Philippines
- 1978–82 – ASEAN Section, Department of Foreign Affairs; Co-ordinator, Australian Institute of International Affairs Conferences
- 1982–83 – Administrative Assistant to the Governor General; executive director of the Australian National Word Festival
- 1983–85 – Cultural Counsellor at the Australian Embassy in Tokyo, Japan
- 1986 – Director, Japan Section, Department of Foreign Affairs and Trade
- 1987–88 – Director, Australia-Japan Foundation, Department of Foreign Affairs and Trade; visiting fellow at the Department of Asian Studies, Australian National University
- 1988 – Chargé d'Affaires with the Australian Embassy in Amman, Jordan, and research associate with the Korean Research Foundation and Yonsei University in Seoul, South Korea
- 1989–90 – Counsellor with the Australian Mission to the United Nations in New York City, United States
- 1990–92 – On leave from the Department of Foreign Affairs and Trade to undertake freelance work, including lecturing, journalism, broadcasting and research on Australia/Asian affairs
- 1992–93 – Regional Director with the Department of Foreign Affairs and Trade in Melbourne
- 1993–94 – Director, Advocacy and Planning, Australia Council
- 1995 – Visiting Fellow, Australian Defence Force Academy
- 1995–96 – Research Associate, Ibero American University, Mexico
- 1996 – Visiting Fellow, University of Canberra
- 1996–99 – Visiting Fellow, Australian National University

== Bibliography ==
=== Books ===
- 1974: Take One Ambassador (Macmillan) ISBN 978-0333139462
- 1992: The Yellow Lady : Australian Impressions of Asia (Melbourne: Oxford University Press) ISBN 978-0195534528
- 1996: The Yellow Lady : Australian Impressions of Asia, 2nd edition (Melbourne: Oxford University Press)
- 2003: About Face : Asian Accounts of Australia, (Melbourne: Scribe Publications)
- 2003: Howard's War (Scribe Publications) (Scribe Short Books) ISBN 0908011997
- 2004: as editor, Double Vision: Asian Accounts of Australia (Canberra: Pandanus Books) ISBN 1740760492
- 2005: with James Wilkinson, The Third Try: Can the UN Work? (Scribe Publications) (Scribe Short Books)
- 2007: "Allied and Addicted" (Scribe Publications) (Scribe Short Books)

=== Articles ===
- "A Long Journey on the Ikebana Road", The National Library of Australia Magazine, 8 (1): 20–23.
