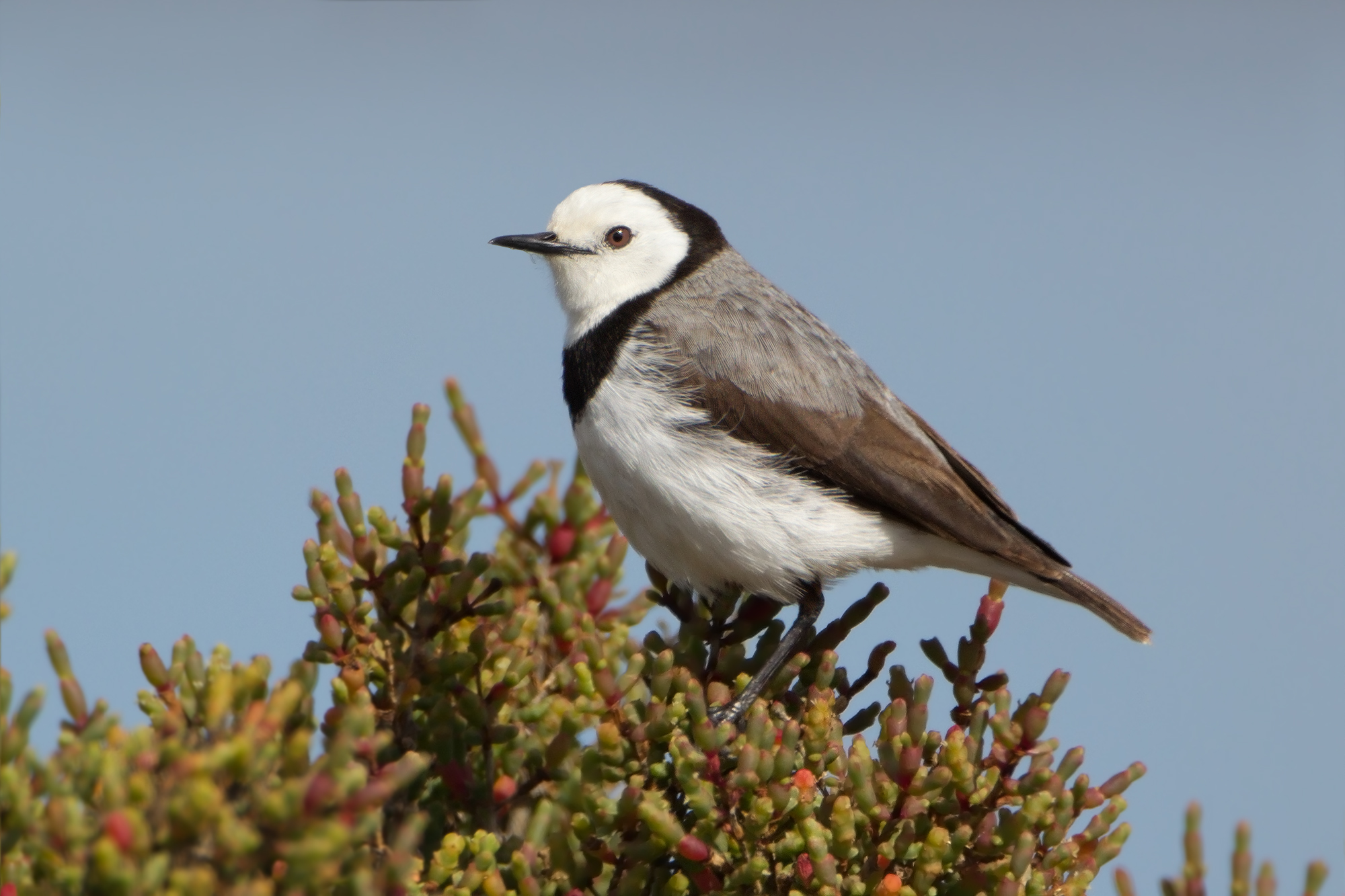
- male
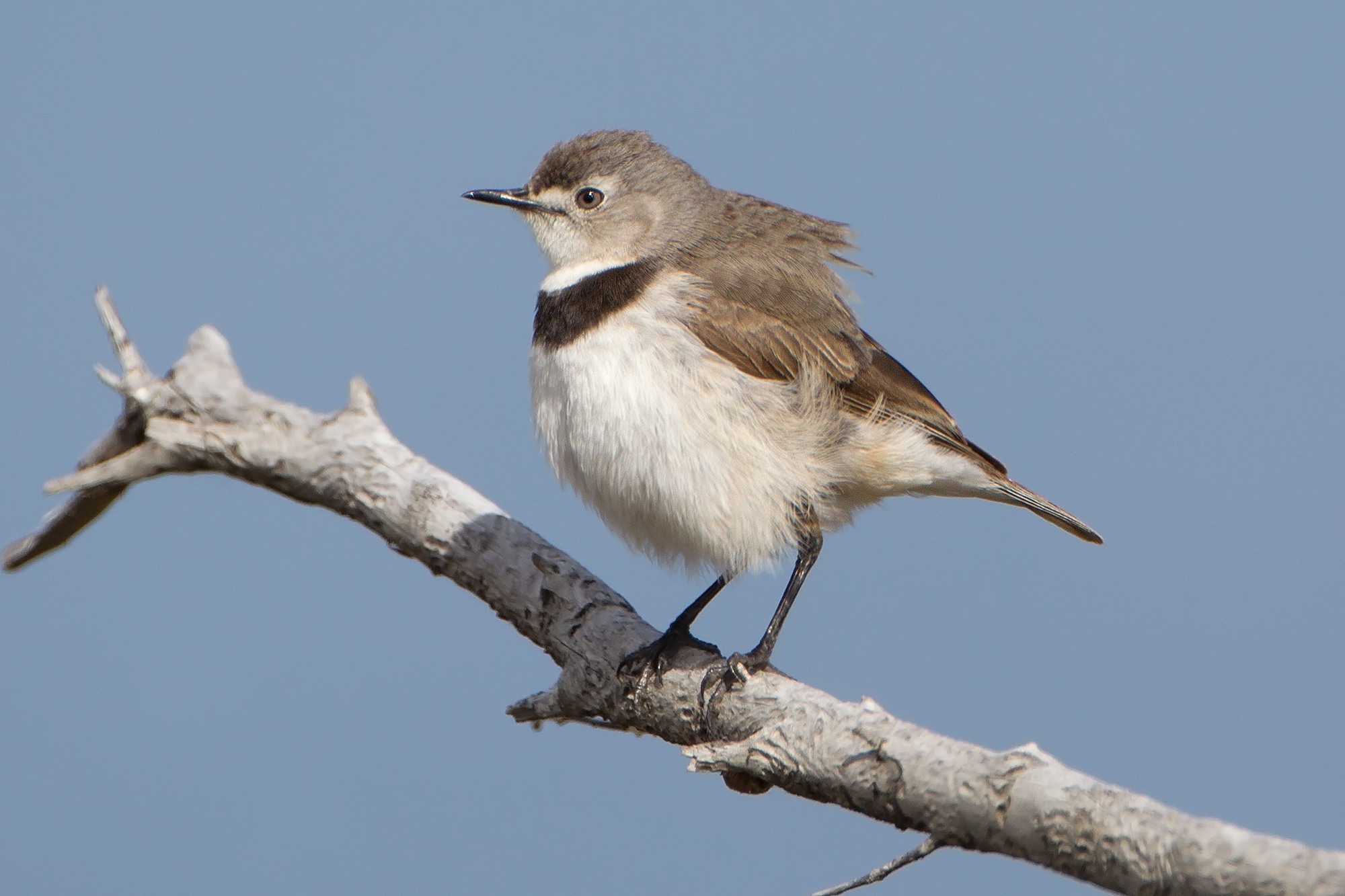
- female

Conservation status
- Least Concern (IUCN 3.1)

Scientific classification
- Kingdom: Animalia
- Phylum: Chordata
- Class: Aves
- Order: Passeriformes
- Family: Meliphagidae
- Genus: Epthianura
- Species: E. albifrons

Binomial name
- Epthianura albifrons (Jardine & Selby, 1828)

Synonyms
- Acanthiza albifrons Jardine & Selby; Fluvicola leucocephala Lesson; Cinura torquata Brehm

= White-fronted chat =

Species of bird

The white-fronted chat (Epthianura albifrons) is a species of bird in the honeyeater family Meliphagidae native to southern Australia. The male has a white face bordered by a black breast band. It is insectivorous.

== Taxonomy ==
Sir Willam Jardine and P.J.Selby described the white-fronted chat in 1828 as Acanthiza albifrons. Lesson described it in 1844 as Fluvicola leucocephala, and Brehm as Cinura torquata in 1845. John Gould named it Epthianura albifrons in 1838. The derivation of the generic name Epthianura is obscure, coming either from the Ancient Greek ephthos 'refined' or ephthinaō 'wasting away' and oura 'tail' (referring to the "short and truncated tail"). The specific epithet albifrons derives from the Latin albus 'white' and frons 'forehead'.

The species is monotypic; that is, no subspecies are recognised. Tasmanian birds were thought to have longer bills but this has not been borne out on further investigation.

This species has collected many vernacular names. From its distinctive call were derived the names (banded) tintack, gar and tang, and the males' resemblance to a nun's habit led to the name (white-fronted) nun, and similarly moonface, moonbird, baldyhead, baldy, ringneck, ringlet and singlebar also come from its appearance. The derivation of other names, such as clipper and tripper, is unclear.

== Description ==
Adult white-fronted chats are 11–13 cm (4.3–5.1 in) in length and weigh 11–17 g (0.4–0.6 oz). The male has a white face and breast bordered by a black band across the breast and nape to the hind crown. The upperparts are silver-grey, wings and upper tail coverts are dark brown, and the abdomen is white. The eyes of the male are pinkish-white, whereas the eyes of the female are brown. The female has grey-brown upperparts and white or pale grey underparts with a fainter blackish-brown breast band.

The contact call, a metallic tang sound given in flight at irregular intervals, has been likened to the twanging of a rubber band.

== Distribution and habitat ==
The white-fronted chat is endemic to Australia, being found across southern Australia (including Tasmania) from Shark Bay in Western Australia around to the Darling Downs in Queensland. Its preferred habitat is open country with low vegetation, including samphire (Tecticornia), tea-tree (Melaleuca) and heath, in saltmarshes and coastal dunes, in swamp or mangrove margins and around inland salt lakes. It is generally sedentary in the wetter southern part of its range, though it may be nomadic in more arid areas.

== Behaviour ==
The white-fronted chat is usually conspicuous, perching prominently on bushes, tussocks or fences. However, it is quite secretive in approaching the nest, engaging in distraction displays. They are a gregarious species, often nesting in small colonies.

=== Breeding ===
In the breeding season from June to January, the female builds a cup-shaped nest of grasses and twigs, lined with fine grass, feathers, wool and hair, which is well concealed in a tussock or a low shrub. A clutch of 2 to 4 eggs is incubated by both parents for 13–14 days. The eggs measure 17 mm × 14 mm (0.67 in × 0.55 in) and are white, spotted with reddish-brown at the large end. The chicks are fed by both parents and fledge after 10–15 days. The nests are occasionally parasitised by Horsfield's bronze-cuckoo (Chrysococcyx basalis).

=== Feeding ===
The white-fronted chat usually forages singly or in small parties, seeking insects in low bushes or on the ground. Their diet consists of a wide variety of insects, including beetles, ants, bees, grasshoppers, moths and caterpillars, as well as spiders, acacia seeds, and nectar.

== Conservation status ==
The white-fronted chat has been listed as vulnerable in New South Wales, with a significant decline of 65% recorded for the period 1981–2005. It is considered threatened in the Adelaide-Mount Lofty region of South Australia, where it has become much rarer. However, it is listed globally as Least Concern on the IUCN Red List.
