= Richard Broinowski =

Australian diplomat and writer

Richard Broinowski AO
- Born: 8 May 1940 (age 86); Melbourne, Victoria, Australia
- Education: University of Adelaide (LLB); Harvard Kennedy School (MPA)
- Occupations: Public servant, diplomat
- Spouse: Alison Broinowski (m. 1963)
- Children: Anna Broinowski; Adam Broinowski

Richard Philip Broinowski (born 8 May 1940) is a former Australian public servant and diplomat. He worked in Mexico, Korea, Vietnam, Japan, the Philippines, Iran and Burma, including as Ambassador to Mexico, Ambassador to Vietnam, and Ambassador to South Korea.

== Life and career ==
Born in Melbourne, Victoria in May 1940, Broinowski was the grandson of Robert Broinowski, a public servant and author about whom the younger wrote a biography: A Witness to History (published 2001)., and a great-grandson of Gracius Broinowski, an artist and ornithologist.

Obtaining his Bachelor of Laws from the University of Adelaide in 1961, Broinowski was admitted to the South Australian Supreme Court Bar in Adelaide in 1963. Later in 1963, Broinowski joined the Department of External Affairs as a junior diplomat and began studying Japanese at the Australian National University. His early postings were to Tokyo, Rangoon, Tehran and Manila. In 1975, when sent to Manila, he and his wife Alison Broinowski, whom he had married in 1963, became the first husband and wife the department had sent to serve in the same mission.

Broinowski was appointed to his first ambassadorial role in 1983, as Australian Ambassador to Vietnam. His appointment in Hanoi was for two years, during a time when the Australian Government wished to restore normal bilateral relations with Vietnam in the post-Vietnam War environment. The appointment was his first term serving separately to his wife, Alison, who was the Australian Government's cultural attache in Tokyo. At the time, Broinowski told media that he had reservations about the Department of Foreign Affairs' rule that a head of mission could not serve in the same legation as his or her spouse.

Between 1987 and 1989 Broinowski was Australian Ambassador to South Korea, including during the time of the 1988 Summer Olympics.

From 1990 he worked for three years at the Australian Broadcasting Corporation, as managing director of Radio Australia, before returning to the Department of Foreign Affairs and Trade in 1993. His final ambassadorial posting was announced in April 1994, as Australian Ambassador to Mexico, before his retirement in 1997.

In retirement, Broinowski became an adjunct professor in Media and Communications, working first at the University of Canberra before moving to the University of Sydney. He is a former President of Australian Institute of International Affairs NSW. On 10 June 2019 Queen's Birthday Honours Broinowski became an Officer in the General Division of the order of Australia.

In 2021 he was awarded the Judges' Special Prize at the Victorian Community History Awards for Under the Rainbow.

== Books published ==
- A Witness to History: The Life and Times of Robert Broinowski. Melbourne University Press. 2001. ISBN 0522849423.
- Fact or Fission?: The Truth about Australia's Nuclear Ambitions. Scribe. 2003. ISBN 192076903X.
- Driven: A Diplomat's Autobiography. ABC/HarperCollins. 2009. ISBN 9780733324031.
- Fallout from Fukushima. Scribe. 2012. ISBN 9781922070166.
- Under the Rainbow: The Life and Times of E.W. Cole. Melbourne University Publishing. 2020. ISBN 9780522876222.
- Fact or Fission?: The Truth about Australia's Nuclear Ambitions. Scribe. 2022. ISBN 9781922585745.

Diplomatic posts
Preceded by John McCarthy	Australian Ambassador to Vietnam; 1983–1985	Succeeded by Ian Lincoln
Preceded by Lance Joseph	Australian Ambassador to South Korea; 1987–1989	Succeeded by Darren Gribble
Preceded by Keith Baker	Australian Ambassador to Mexico; Australian Ambassador to Cuba; 1994–1997	Succeeded by Robert Hamilton
