= Robert Broinowski =

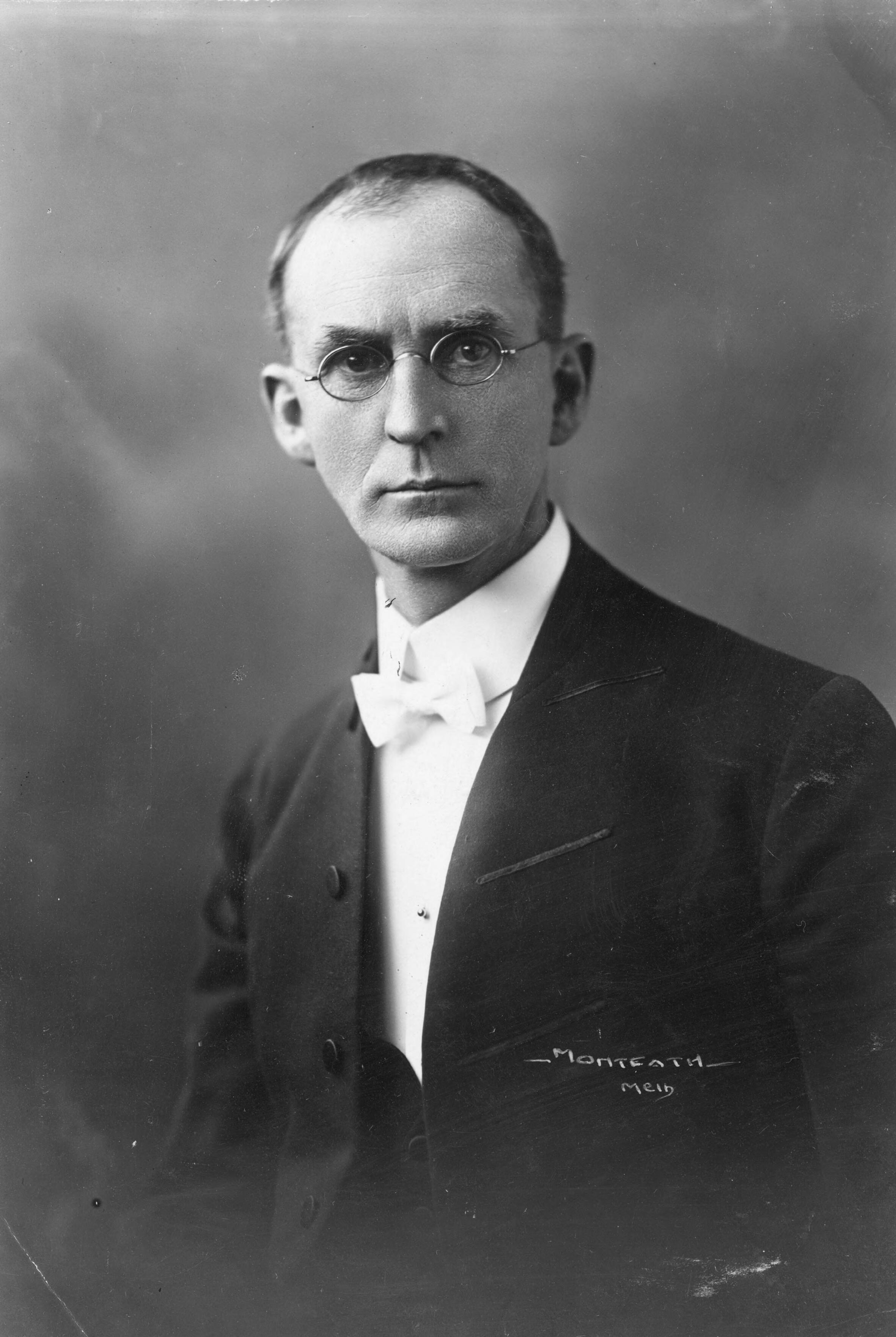

Clerk of the Australian Senate
- In office 1 January 1939 – 30 November 1942
- Preceded by: George Monahan
- Succeeded by: John Edwards

Personal details
- Born: 1 December 1877 Balwyn, Victoria, Australia
- Died: 16 August 1959 (aged 81) Lindfield, New South Wales, Australia
- Spouse(s): Grace Evans (m. 1906; div. 1926) Kathleen Knell (m. 1927)
- Relations: Gracius Broinowski (father); Richard Broinowski (grandson)

Robert Arthur Broinowski (1 December 1877 – 16 August 1959) was an Australian public servant. He served as clerk of the Australian Senate from 1939 to 1942.

== Early life ==
Broinowski was born on 1 December 1877 in Balwyn, Victoria. He was one of eight children born to Jane (née Smith) and Gracius Broinowski. His father was a Polish-born ornithologist and artist who arrived in Australia in the 1850s.

Broinowski and his family moved to Sydney in 1880. He attended a state school in Milsons Point, then went on to St Aloysius' College where his father was an art teacher.

== Career ==
In 1902, Broinowski joined the Commonwealth Public Service in Melbourne as a clerk with the Department of Defence, a position obtained via Prime Minister Edmund Barton who was a friend of his father. In 1907 he was appointed private secretary to the minister for defence, working under Thomas Ewing, George Pearce, and Joseph Cook.

Broinowski transferred to Federal Parliament in 1911 as a clerk and shorthand writer in the Department of the Senate, working out of Parliament House, Melbourne. He was promoted to clerk of papers in 1915 and to usher of the black rod, clerk of committees, and accountant in 1920. As usher of the black rod, he was involved in the ceremonial opening of the first sitting of parliament in the new capital Canberra in 1927.

Broinowski was promoted to clerk-assistant of the Senate in 1930 and was also made secretary of parliament's joint house department, responsible for the parliamentary facilities and grounds. He played a key role in the development of the National Rose Garden at the Provisional Parliament House, writing to state rose societies and private donors to solicit a wide variety of roses for the gardens. He secured donations of lilies from Japan and tulips from the Netherlands, as well as trees from Canada and the United States. In 1933, he and Senate president Walter Kingsmill also successfully lobbied against the facilities for the proposed National Library of Australia being constructed in the grounds of Parliament House, with the result that a new building was constructed to clearly separate the National Library from the Commonwealth Parliamentary Library.

Broinowski succeeded as clerk of the Senate on 1 January 1939, where he had "a reputation as a fierce defender of the dignity and forms of the Senate" and was "uncomfortable with the executive's increasing domination of Parliament". He retired at the compulsory age of 65 after a relatively brief term on 30 November 1942. Earlier that year he had been described in a Sunday Telegraph article by Richard Hughes as "a thin querulous fellow, with a beaky nose, light, angry eyebrows, and a small wig [who] hisses acid instructions and advice to the timid Senators like a bad-tempered stage prompter". This and other criticisms of senators in the same article led Hughes and four of his colleagues to be banned from Parliament House for several months.

== Other activities ==
Broinowski was interested in literature, the arts and nature. He was secretary of Melbourne's Repertory Theatre Club and a member of various literary societies. He contributed verse to Birth: A Little Journal of Australian Poetry and was editor of the poetry page in Stead's Review. In 1924 he became editor of The Spinner, a poetry magazine financed by Edward Vidler which published works by Mary Gilmore, Shaw Neilson and Marie Pitt. He resigned that position after moving to Canberra in 1927, where he became the first president of the town's Arts and Literature Society. In retirement he was a book reviewer for The Sydney Morning Herald, made radio appearances on 2CH, and was a narrator for children's audiobooks.

Broinowski was also a keen bushwalker, developing a friendship with Robert Henderson Croll through their membership of the Melbourne Walking Club. He donated the Broinowski Cup as a prize for a tennis competition for Canberra public servants.

== Personal life ==
In 1906, Broinowski married Grace Evans, a professional violinist, with whom he had two sons. He was divorced in 1926 and remarried the following year to Kathleen Knell, with whom he had a daughter.

Broinowski and his second wife retired to Sydney. He died at his home in Lindfield on 16 August 1959, due to "cardio-vascular degeneration and cerebral arteriosclerosis". He was interred at the Northern Suburbs Crematorium.
