= Hunter Estuary Wetlands =

Australian wetlands

Coordinates: 32°50′59″S 151°43′05″E

Designations

Ramsar Wetland
- Official name: Hunter Estuary Wetlands
- Designated: 21 February 1984
- Reference no.: 287

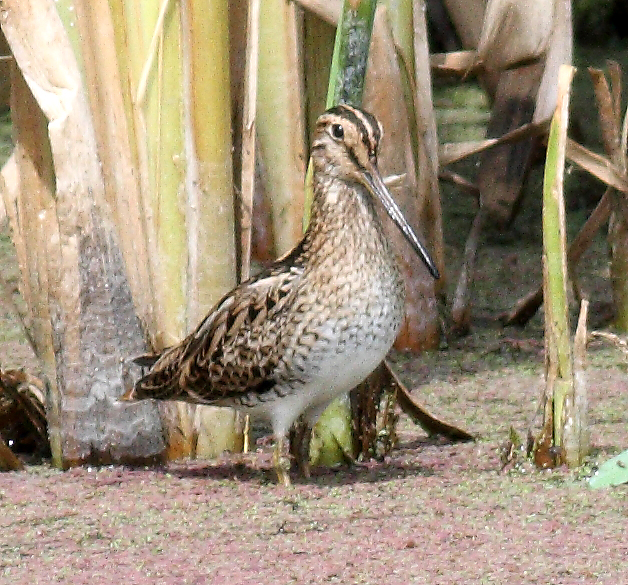
The wetlands are an important site for Latham's snipe

The Hunter Estuary Wetlands comprise a group of associated wetlands at and near the mouth of the Hunter River in the city of Newcastle, New South Wales, Australia. The wetlands are part of Hunter Wetlands National Park. 30 km^{2} of the wetlands have been recognised as being of international importance by designation under the Ramsar Convention. It was listed on 21 February 1984 as Ramsar site 287. A larger area of the wetlands has been identified by BirdLife International as an Important Bird Area (IBA). The wetlands are recognised as the most important area in New South Wales for waders, or shorebirds.

== Description ==
=== Ramsar site ===
The Ramsar site comprises the Kooragang Nature Reserve and the nearby Shortland Wetlands, which are connected by a wildlife corridor that includes the Hunter River and Ironbark Creek. Kooragang Island is an artificial, estuarine island liable to flooding at high tide. Its habitats include mangroves, brackish and freshwater swamps, saltmarsh, Casuarina forest, mudflats, beaches, and rock walls. The site is important for migratory waders and the mangroves are important for fish. Surrounding areas are used for livestock grazing and heavy industry.

Shortland is a 45 ha complex of various wetland types that was added to the Ramsar site in 2002. It contains Melaleuca swamp forest, freshwater reed marsh, and a mangrove-lined creek, surrounded by urban development. The previously degraded wetlands have been restored through the establishment of the Shortland Wetlands Centre (now the Hunter Wetlands Centre Australia) in 1984.

=== Important Bird Area ===
The 85 km^{2} IBA includes, as well as the Ramsar-listed areas, the Hexham Swamp, Pambalong and Newcastle Wetlands Nature Reserves. It was identified as an IBA because the swamps and the estuary support the endangered Australasian bittern and over 1% of the world populations of chestnut teal, straw-necked ibis, red-necked avocet, eastern curlew, sharp-tailed sandpiper and sometimes Latham's snipe.
