= The Birds of Australia (Broinowski) =

Book depicting Australian birds

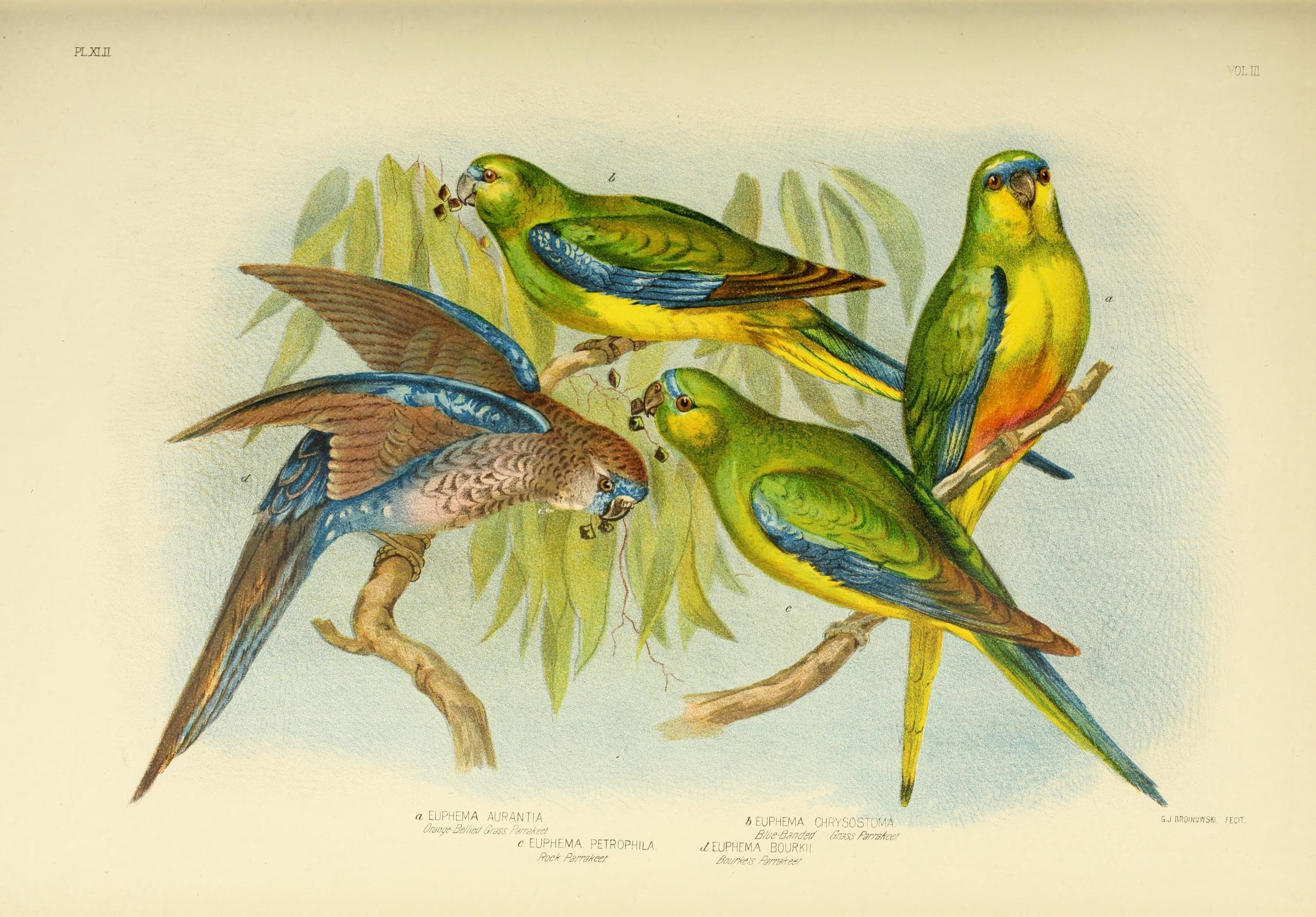
- Author: Gracius J. Broinowski
- Illustrator: Gracius J. Broinowski
- Language: English
- Subject: Australian birds
- Genre: Fine illustrated book
- Publisher: Charles Stuart & Co: Melbourne
- Publication date: 1890-1891
- Publication place: Australia
- Media type: Print with chromolithographic plates

The Birds of Australia is an illustrated book depicting Australian birds. It comprises six parts (often bound as three volumes) of 303 full-page, folio-sized, chromolithographed illustrations of over 700 species of Australian birds, with accompanying descriptive text. It was authored by Gracius Joseph Broinowski of Sydney, Australia and published in the early 1890s.

In 1987, 37 of Broinowski's illustrations were reproduced by the Broinowski Publishing Co of Perth, Western Australia in a limited edition of 850 numbered copies:

- Birds Of Australia. Gracius Joseph Broinowski. A Selection of his Finest Lithographs 1887-1891. ISBN 0-949169-09-9

== Publications ==
- Broinowski, Gracius Joseph (1890–1891). The Birds of Australia: Comprising three hundred Full-Page Illustrations, with a Descriptive Account of the Life and Characteristic Habits of over seven hundred Species. Melbourne: Charles Stuart. doi:10.5962/bhl.title.77352. LCCN 32015544. OCLC 6075423. Wikidata Q135230777.
