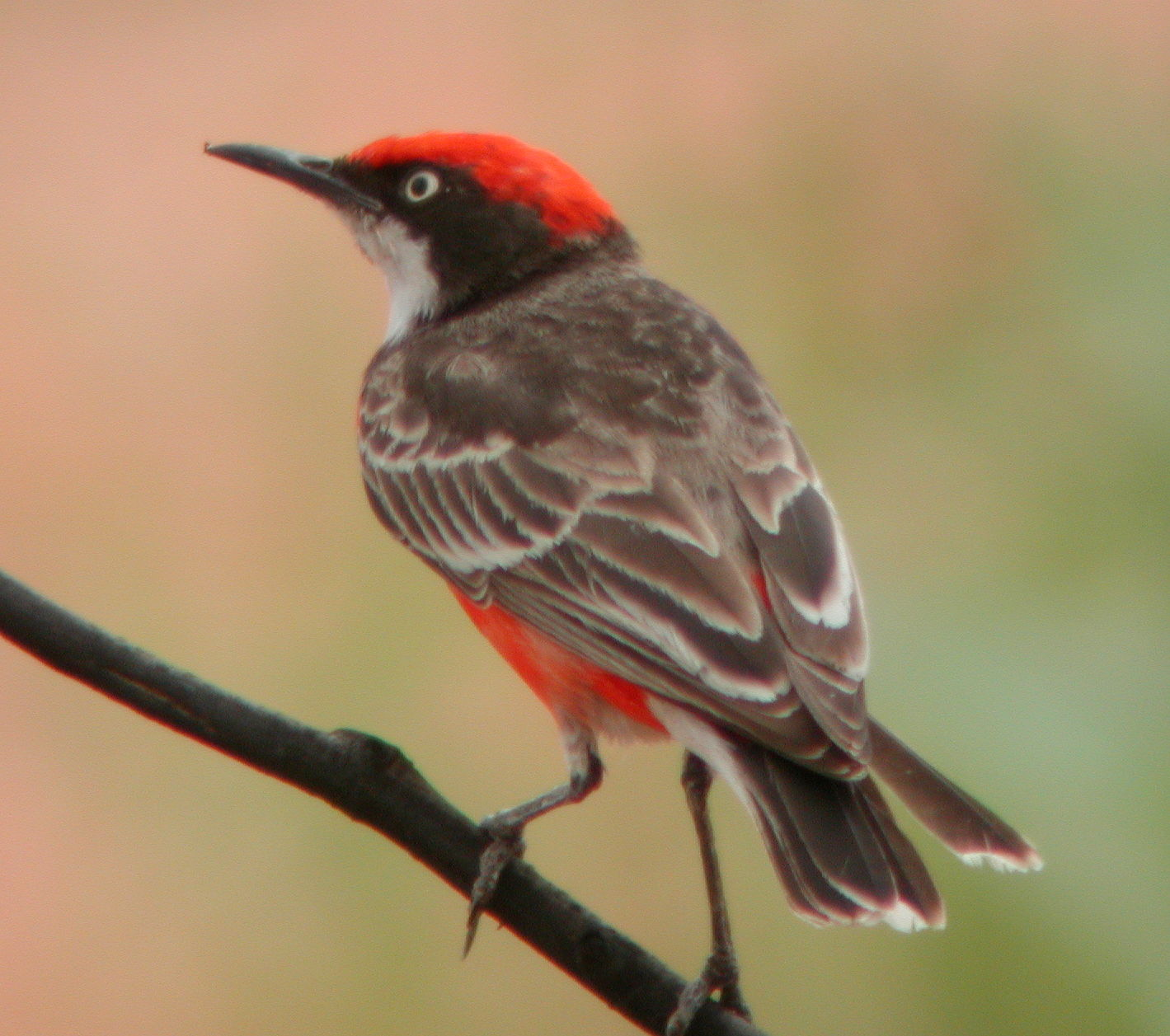
- Male
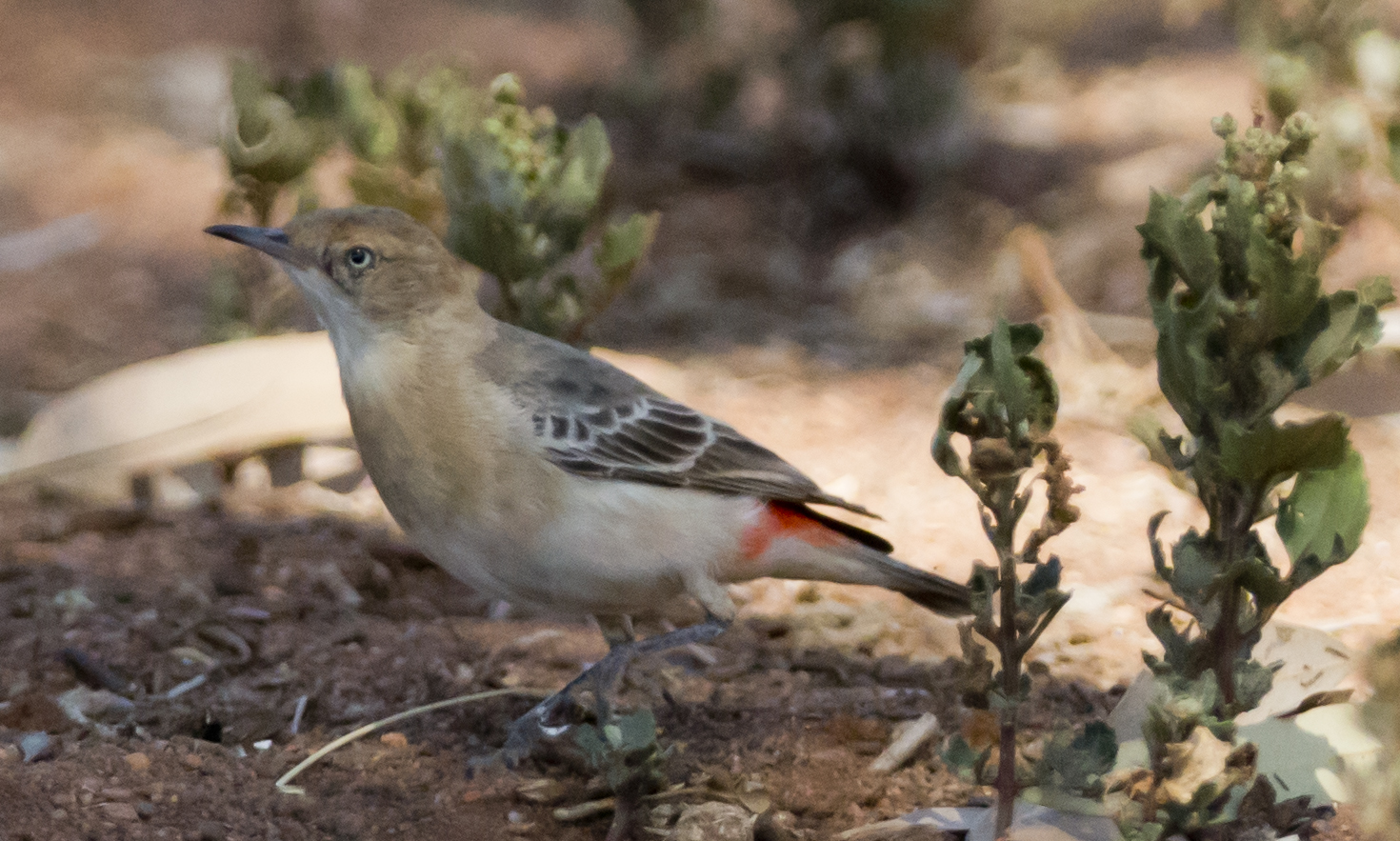
- Female in Western Australia

Conservation status
- Least Concern (IUCN 3.1)

Scientific classification
- Kingdom: Animalia
- Phylum: Chordata
- Class: Aves
- Order: Passeriformes
- Family: Meliphagidae
- Genus: Epthianura
- Species: E. tricolor

Binomial name
- Epthianura tricolor Gould, 1841

= Crimson chat =

Species of bird

The crimson chat (Epthianura tricolor) is a species of small bird found in Australia. It is also known as the tricoloured chat, saltbush canary, and crimson-breasted nun.

== Description ==
Crimson chats are usually 10–13 cm (3.9–5.1 in) in length and 10–11 g (0.35–0.39 oz) in weight. They have long, thin legs; a pointy, downward curving bill; and a brush-like tipped tongue. Adult males are covered in brown feathers, have red crowns and under parts; a black mask around their eyes; and white throats. Females and younger chats are colored similarly, but with paler markings. The males are usually more brightly colored than females, specifically during the breeding season in order to attract a mate.

=== Similar species ===
A bird species similar to and often confused with the crimson chat is the male red-capped robin, whose scientific name is Petroica goodenovii. However, there are three main differences between their characteristics. A male crimson chat has crimson crown and underparts, white throat and a yellow eye; whereas the red-capped robin has a black body with crimson chest and cap, white wing marks and a dark eye. Also, the crimson chat's bill is thinner and longer than the robin's. When a crimson chat is seen, a saltbush, Spinifex, or mulga can usually be found nearby, as they are plants often associated with this species. According to relevant Federal and NSW organizations, the conservation of this bird is secure. Its only significant threat is being killed by predators.

== Distribution and habitat ==
Crimson chats can be found in deserts, semi-arid regions, woodlands, grasslands and coastal shrublands in the central part of Australia from the west coast to the Great Dividing Range and from the tropics to the south coast. Generally, they tend to inhabit areas on the fringes of wet regions, where it is more dry. They live in various types of shrubland: saltbush, bluebush, acacia and samphire. They move to wetter areas when rainfall is insufficient, which means that there are not enough nutrients produced for the birds to consume. Flocks of crimson chats may wander over a wide area around their range in order to track rain. This nomadic movement helps them find the best flowers and nectar. However, chats do not follow routine seasonal migrations.

== Behaviour ==
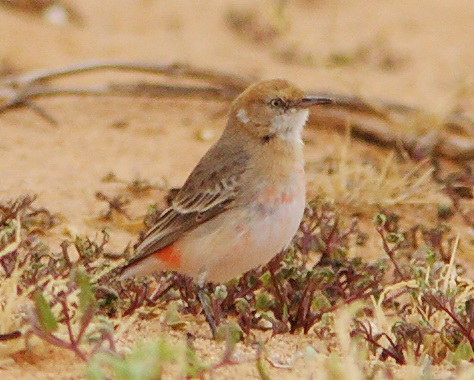
Female

=== Diet ===
Crimson chats eat insects and spiders that are on the ground or in shrubs, and they can use their brush-like tongue to extract nectar or take seeds from flowers close to the ground. They walk more often than they hop and are usually seen on or near the ground.

=== Breeding ===
Crimson chats are found in small flocks and go in pairs throughout the breeding season and the rest of the year. Chats breed from August to October in the south and at almost any time in the drier northern regions following rain. These flocks form clusters of nests, which are defended by both the male and female chats. Most calls are soft, metallic twangs ("dik-it-dik-it") or high pitched whistles (like "see" or "seet"). When agitated they make a chattering sound (a quick "check-check"), which is where their name originates.

In this species, both sexes help build a nest in a cup shape, which is located close to the ground in low shrub or grass. It is usually made with grass, rootlets, hair, feathers and twigs. The female lays 2 to 4 pink and white, brown-red spotted eggs, measuring 17 mm × 13 mm (0.67 in × 0.51 in). Both parents help incubate the eggs for 12–13 days and feed the young birds once they have hatched for two weeks until they can fly on their own to find food. If a predator comes near the nest either parent will fake an injury to distract the creature away from the nest. Predators include cats, snakes, foxes and larger birds like ravens.
