= Australia–Barbados relations =

- Australia: Barbados

Foreign relations exist between Australia and Barbados. Neither country has a resident ambassador. The regional Australian High Commissioner to Barbados is accredited from Port of Spain, Trinidad and Tobago. Barbados is represented in Australia through its High Commission in Ottawa, (Canada). Barbados maintains an honorary consul and a tourist office in Australia. Barbados and Australia established diplomatic relations on 7 January 1974. Both countries are members of the Commonwealth of Nations, and comprised as former parts of the British Empire.

== History ==
Barbados and Australia established diplomatic relations on 7 January 1974 with J. C. Ingram as the first High Commissioner. In 2001, Winfred Peppinck was appointed as High Commissioner. From 1994 to 2004 Australia's High Commission in the Caribbean was resident in Bridgetown, Barbados. At that point the regional mission moved to Port of Spain in Trinidad and Tobago; due in part to the robust trade by Australian companies with Trinidad and Tobago's oil sector. It now serves Barbados and 13 other Caribbean countries. The official opening of the new building was made on 14 December 2006. By 2010, Philip Kentwell held the position of High Commissioner, now renamed Plenipotentiary Representative of Australia to the Caribbean Community. Kentwell remarked to the media that a new resident consulate was presently being planned for Barbados awaiting an official appointee to that post.

In 2018, the Freundel Stuart-led administration celebrated Australia Day in Barbados to highlight the 44-years of diplomatic relations between both nations.

In 2021, the Barbadian Mia Mottley administration held talks with the government of Australia with the aim of furthering ties following Barbados transitioning to a republic as well as discussions on climate change.

== Economic relations ==
Monthly value of Australian merchandise exports to Barbados (A$ millions) since 1988

In 2009, multinational BHP Billiton, headquartered in Melbourne, became the first company to be granted a concession to search for oil and gas in the maritime areas of Barbados. The company was awarded offshore blocks in Carlisle Bay and Bimshire. In 2011, the Barbados government minister of Finance stated that various legislation was remedied to allow the Australian energy company to begin exploration in the near-term.

In 2009, both nations gave some consideration to the signing of a double taxation agreement between their two nations. Maxine McClean, the Minister of Foreign Affairs and Foreign Trade for Barbados said: "You will no doubt agree that the negotiation and conclusion of relevant agreements will result in increased foreign direct investment, trade and general co-operation to our mutual benefit. In this regard Barbados looks forward greatly to the enhancement of its relationship and co-operation with Australia."

== See also ==
- Garfield Sobers, Barbados born cricketer playing in Australia
- Arthur Windsor (1833–1913), Australian publisher born at sea on a trip to Barbados
- Caribbean Australian
