= Arthur Windsor (disambiguation) =

Arthur Windsor (1832–1913) was an Australian journalist.

Arthur Windsor may also refer to:

- Prince Arthur, Duke of Connaught and Strathearn (1850–1942), third son of Queen Victoria of the United Kingdom
- Prince Arthur of Connaught (1883–1938), the only son of the above Prince Arthur
