= List of high commissioners of Australia to Bangladesh =

High Commissioner of Australia to Bangladesh

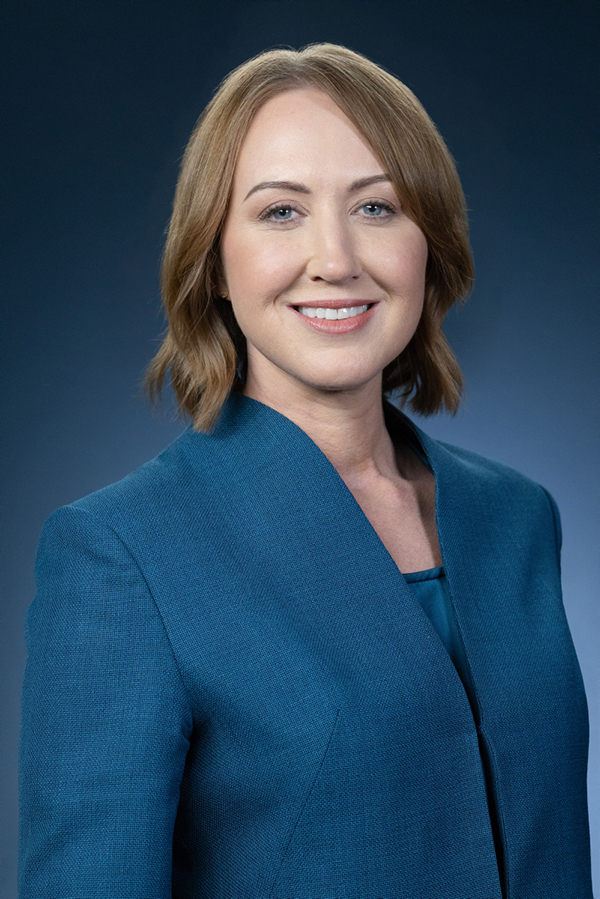
- Incumbent; Susan Ryle since 23 December 2024
- Department of Foreign Affairs and Trade
- Style: His Excellency
- Reports to: Minister for Foreign Affairs
- Residence: Gulshan Thana
- Seat: Dhaka
- Nominator: Prime Minister of Australia
- Appointer: Governor General of Australia
- Inaugural holder: Jim Allen
- Formation: 30 April 1969 (Deputy High Commissioner); 13 March 1972 (Ambassador); 18 April 1972 (High Commissioner)
- Website: Australian High Commission, Bangladesh

The high commissioner of Australia to Bangladesh is an officer of the Australian Department of Foreign Affairs and Trade and the head of the High Commission of the Commonwealth of Australia to the People's Republic of Bangladesh. The high commission is located in Dhaka. The high commissioner has the rank and status of an ambassador extraordinary and plenipotentiary and is held, since January 2024, by Nardia Simpson, as acting high commissioner.

== Posting history ==
The first official Australian presence in Bangladesh dates back to April 1969, when a Deputy High Commission (reporting to the High Commission of Australia in Islamabad, West Pakistan) was opened in the city of Dacca, the capital of East Pakistan. Career diplomat James Lawrence (Jim) Allen, was appointed as Deputy High Commissioner, operating from the Purbani Hotel in Motijheel Thana. Allen had previously served as the secretary to Richard Casey during his term as Governor of Bengal (1944–1946).

Australia was one of the first nations to officially recognise Bangladesh as an independent country on 31 January 1972, following the end of the Bangladesh Liberation War on 16 December 1971 and its status as East Pakistan. On 13 March 1972, the former deputy high commissioner in Dacca (renamed Dhaka in 1982) and chargé d'affaires of the Australian mission since the establishment of diplomatic relations, Jim Allen, was appointed as Australia's first Ambassador to Bangladesh, which was quickly upgraded to the rank of high commissioner following Bangladesh's admission to the Commonwealth of Nations on 18 April 1972. Allen presented his letters of commission to the President of Bangladesh, Abu Sayeed Chowdhury, on 21 April 1972. Allen assisted in the first Australian official visit to Bangladesh, with the goodwill visit of the Australian foreign minister, Nigel Bowen, from 28 to 29 May 1972. On 26 January 1983, a new chancery for the High Commission was opened at 184 Gulshan Avenue, Gulshan, Dhaka.

== Heads of mission ==
#	Officeholder	Title	Residency	Term start date	Term end date	Time in office	Notes
−	Jim Allen	Deputy High Commissioner	Dacca, East Pakistan	30 April 1968	31 January 1972	3 years, 276 days	
−	Jim Allen	Chargé d'affaires	Dacca, Bangladesh	31 January 1972	13 March 1972	42 days	
1	Jim Allen	Ambassador	Dacca, Bangladesh	13 March 1972	18 April 1972	36 days	
1	Jim Allen	High Commissioner	Dacca, Bangladesh	18 April 1972	31 December 1973	1 year, 257 days	
2	Philip Flood	High Commissioner	Dacca, Bangladesh	23 February 1974	15 June 1976	2 years, 113 days	
3	Tim McDonald	High Commissioner	Dacca, Bangladesh	15 June 1976	December 1977	1 year, 5 months	
4	John Hoyle	High Commissioner	Dacca, Bangladesh	January 1978	December 1979	1 year, 11 months	
5	Mack Williams	High Commissioner	Dacca, Bangladesh	January 1980	June 1982	2 years, 5 months	
6	Ian Mitchell	High Commissioner	Dhaka, Bangladesh	June 1982	September 1986	4 years, 3 months	
7	Susan Boyd	High Commissioner	Dhaka, Bangladesh	September 1986	14 September 1989	3 years	
8	Richard Gate	High Commissioner	Dhaka, Bangladesh	14 September 1989	16 August 1993	3 years, 336 days	
9	Kenneth Aspinall	High Commissioner	Dhaka, Bangladesh	16 August 1993	6 August 1996	2 years, 356 days	
10	Charles Stuart	High Commissioner	Dhaka, Bangladesh	6 August 1996	21 June 1999	2 years, 319 days	
11	Robert Flynn	High Commissioner	Dhaka, Bangladesh	21 June 1999	19 June 2002	2 years, 363 days	
12	Lorraine Barker	High Commissioner	Dhaka, Bangladesh	19 June 2002	20 September 2005	3 years, 93 days	
13	Douglas Foskett	High Commissioner	Dhaka, Bangladesh	20 September 2005	December 2008	3 years, 2 months	
14	Justin Lee	High Commissioner	Dhaka, Bangladesh	January 2009	14 June 2012	3 years, 5 months	
15	Greg Wilcock	High Commissioner	Dhaka, Bangladesh	14 June 2012	22 July 2016	4 years, 38 days	
16	Julia Niblett	High Commissioner	Dhaka, Bangladesh	22 July 2016	December 2019	3 years, 4 months	
17	Jeremy Bruer	High Commissioner	Dhaka, Bangladesh	20 February 2020	December 2023	3 years, 9 months	
18	Nardia Simpson (acting)	High Commissioner	Dhaka, Bangladesh	January 2024	incumbent	2 years, 249 days	

== See also ==
- Australia–Bangladesh relations
- Foreign relations of Bangladesh
- Foreign relations of Australia
