= List of ambassadors of Australia to Afghanistan =

Special Representative of Australia on Afghanistan

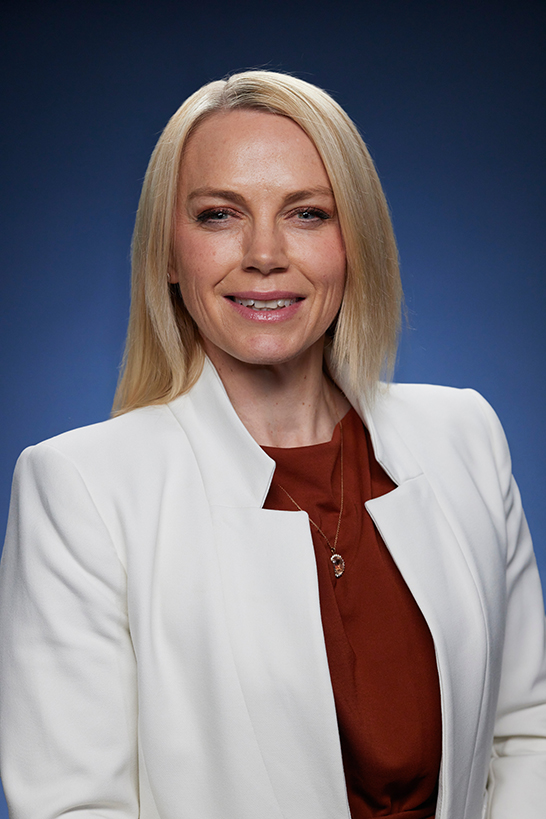
- Incumbent; Amanda McGregor since 3 July 2024
- Department of Foreign Affairs and Trade
- Style: His Excellency
- Reports to: Minister for Foreign Affairs
- Residence: Islamabad (1968–1979; 2002–2006); Kabul (2006–2021); Doha (2021–)
- Nominator: Prime Minister of Australia
- Appointer: Governor General of Australia
- Inaugural holder: Lew Border (Resident in Pakistan)
- Formation: 16 December 1968
- Website: Australia’s Interim Mission to Afghanistan

The Ambassador of Australia to Afghanistan was an officer of the Australian Department of Foreign Affairs and Trade and the head of the Embassy of the Commonwealth of Australia to Afghanistan.

On 28 May 2021 the embassy was closed, immediately prior to the fall of the Islamic Republic of Afghanistan, and the office of ambassador became vacant with the Taliban capture of Kabul on 15 August 2021. Since the embassy's closure and the fall of the Islamic Republic of Afghanistan, the Australian Interim Mission on Afghanistan in Doha, Qatar, headed by a Special Representative since September 2021, has the primary responsibility for Australia's position on and relations with Afghanistan.

== Posting history ==
The establishment of diplomatic relations between Australia and the Kingdom of Afghanistan was announced on 16 December 1968 by the Minister for External Affairs, Paul Hasluck, with the High Commissioner to Pakistan based in Islamabad receiving non-resident accreditation. The first Australian Ambassador to Afghanistan, Lew Border, formally presented his credentials to King Zahir Shah on 30 March 1969. With the assumption of power of Babrak Karmal in Afghanistan following the murder of Hafizullah Amin on 27 December 1979, which marked the beginning of the Soviet–Afghan War, the Australian Government of Malcolm Fraser did not recognise Karmal's new government and diplomatic relations were suspended, with informal connections maintained by the High Commission in Islamabad. With the collapse of the Democratic Republic of Afghanistan in 1992, an agreement was struck between the two countries for the re-establishment of relations at the consular level on 16 April 1993, with an Afghan Honorary Consul, Mahmoud Saikal, appointed to Canberra on 29 September 1994, but relations at the ambassador level remained suspended.

Australia and Afghanistan re-established diplomatic representation in 2002, after a long hiatus during conflict in Afghanistan. Between April 2002 and September 2006, Australia's High Commissioner to Pakistan was accredited as non-resident Ambassador to Afghanistan. The first resident Australian Ambassador to Kabul was appointed in 2006, with the embassy initially located within the United States Embassy, then later the Serena Hotel. In November 2011, Prime Minister Julia Gillard formally opened a new dedicated embassy in the city.

On 28 May 2021 the embassy was closed, immediately prior to the fall of the Islamic Republic of Afghanistan with the Taliban capture of Kabul on 15 August 2021. The office of ambassador fell vacant following the fall of Kabul on 15 August 2021 and relations with Afghanistan were suspended. In September 2021, the Australian Interim Mission on Afghanistan was established in Doha, Qatar, headed by a Special Representative. The first Special Representative appointed was career diplomat, Daniel Sloper, who was the special envoy and head of the Australian crisis response team assisting in the evacuation of Kabul prior to and following its fall to Taliban forces on 15 August 2021.

== Heads of mission ==
=== Ambassadors ===
#	Officeholder	Residency	Term start date	Term end date	Time in office	Notes
1	Lew Border	Islamabad, Pakistan	16 December 1968	May 24, 1970	1 year, 5 months	
–	John Starey (Chargé d'affaires)	Islamabad, Pakistan	24 May 1970	August 1970	69 days	
2	Francis Hamilton Stuart	Islamabad, Pakistan	August 1970	May 1973	2 years, 9 months	
3	Arthur Morris	Islamabad, Pakistan	May 1973	August 1975	2 years, 3 months	
4	John Petherbridge	Islamabad, Pakistan	August 1975	27 December 1979	4 years, 4 months	
Relations suspended
5	Howard Brown	Islamabad, Pakistan	April 2002	16 July 2004	2 years, 3 months	
6	Zorica McCarthy	Islamabad, Pakistan	16 July 2004	9 August 2006	2 years, 24 days	
7	Brett Hackett	Kabul, Afghanistan	9 August 2006	22 January 2008	1 year, 166 days	
8	Martin Quinn	Kabul, Afghanistan	22 January 2008	21 November 2009	1 year, 303 days	
9	Paul Foley	Kabul, Afghanistan	21 November 2009	10 August 2012	2 years, 263 days	
10	Jon Philp	Kabul, Afghanistan	10 August 2012	19 January 2015	2 years, 162 days	
11	Matthew Anderson	Kabul, Afghanistan	19 January 2015	21 July 2016	1 year, 184 days	
12	Richard Feakes	Kabul, Afghanistan	21 July 2016	16 October 2017	1 year, 87 days	
13	Nicola Gordon-Smith	Kabul, Afghanistan	16 October 2017	8 April 2019	1 year, 174 days	
14	Geoffrey Tooth	Kabul, Afghanistan	8 April 2019	19 March 2021	1 year, 345 days	
15	Paul Wojciechowski	Kabul, Afghanistan	19 March 2021	28 May 2021	149 days	
15	Paul Wojciechowski	Doha, Qatar	28 May 2021	15 August 2021	149 days	
Relations suspended

=== Special Representatives ===
#	Officeholder	Residency	Term start date	Term end date	Time in office	Notes
1	Daniel Sloper	Doha, Qatar	9 September 2021	1 June 2022	265 days	
2	Glenn Miles	Doha, Qatar	1 November 2022	present	1453 days	

== See also ==
- List of ambassadors of Afghanistan to Australia
- Embassy of Afghanistan, Canberra
