= Pablo Kang =

Australian diplomat and public servant

His Excellency Pablo Kang
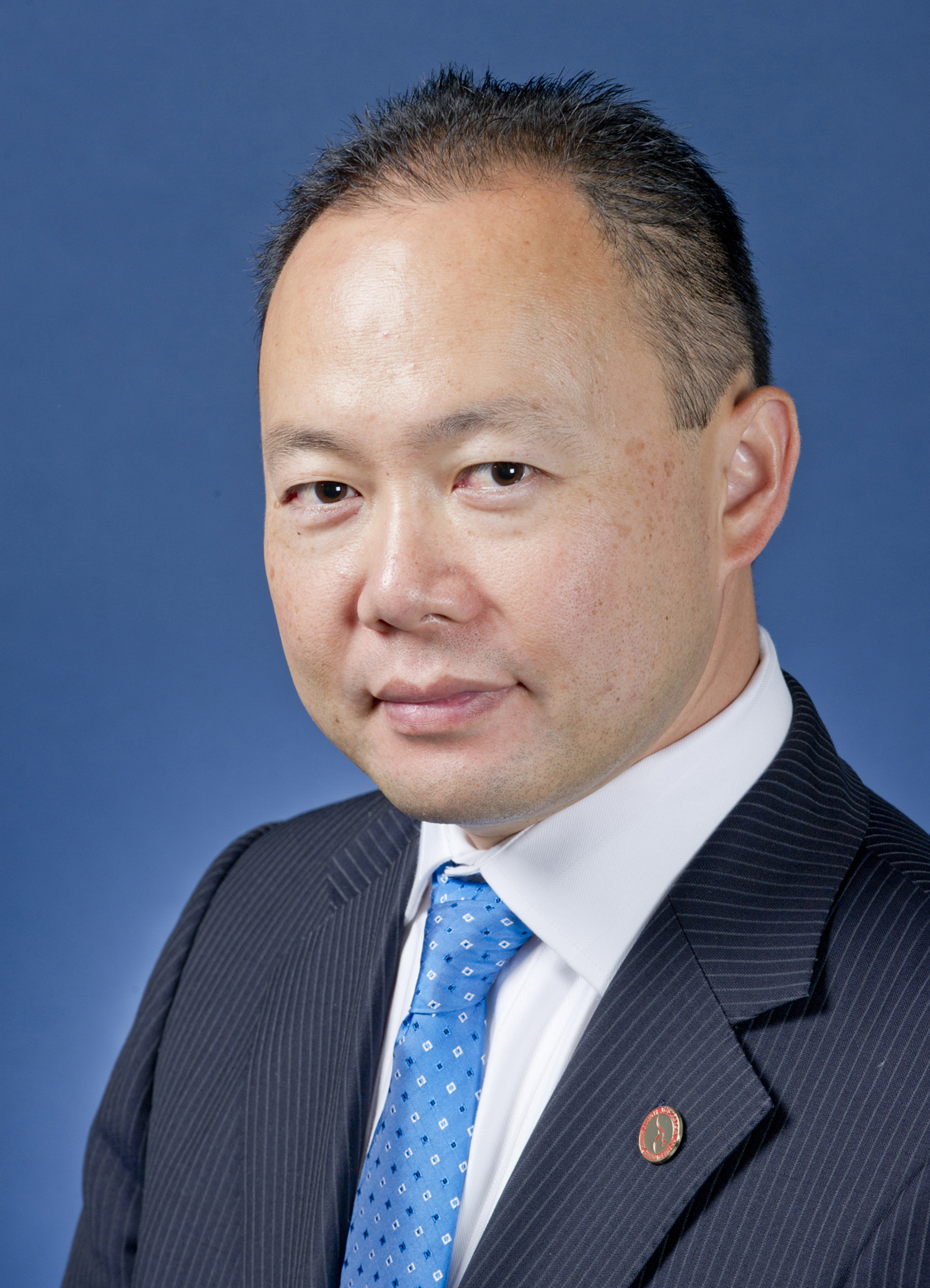

Ambassador of Australia to Cambodia
- In office January 2020 – January 2023
- Preceded by: Angela Corcoran
- Succeeded by: Justin Whyatt

Australian Ambassador to the United Arab Emirates Australian Ambassador to Qatar
- In office January 2012 – 5 January 2016
- Preceded by: Doug Trappett
- Succeeded by: Arthur Spyrou

Australian High Commissioner to Vanuatu
- In office January 2009 – 2010
- Preceded by: John Pilbeam
- Succeeded by: Jeff Roach

Personal details
- Born: 1973 (age 52–53)
- Spouse: Rebecca Macdonald
- Children: 2 (1 adopted)
- Education: University of Sydney; Monash University
- Occupation: Diplomat

Pablo Kang (born 1973) is an Australian diplomat and public servant who served as the Australian ambassador to Cambodia from 2020 to 2023. He was Australian Ambassador to the United Arab Emirates from 2012 to 2016 and Australian High Commissioner to Vanuatu from 2009 to 2010.

== Life and career ==
Born in 1973, Pablo Kang was named after the Spanish artist Pablo Picasso. His parents had emigrated to Australia from Korea in the 1960s.

Kang took up an appointment as Australian High Commissioner to Vanuatu in January 2009. He was responsible for overseeing the implementation of the Australian Government's new aid development arrangements and for arranging Vanuatu's participation in the Pacific Seasonal Worker Pilot Scheme. When he returned to Australia in 2010, Kang was appointed Assistant Secretary heading the International Organisations Branch.

In 2012, Kang was appointed Australia's Ambassador to the United Arab Emirates and to Qatar. He relocated to Abu Dhabi to take up the post. Kang helped to secure the release and return home of Marcus Lee in January 2014. Lee, an Australian businessman, had been detained in Dubai since 2009 on fraud charges related to a Dubai property deal involving Sunland Group. Also in 2014 Kang worked with the UAE Government to bring into force the Australia-UAE bilateral agreement on the peaceful uses of nuclear energy. Under the agreement, Australian uranium suppliers can export uranium to the UAE, which Kang said would represent a considerable diversification in the current terms of trade between the two countries. Kang's posting to Abu Dhabi ended on 5 January 2016 and he was subsequently posted to Cambodia as ambassador in December 2019. Kang was in the post during the COVID-19 pandemic in Cambodia, and announced that Australia would provide COVID-19 vaccines and financial aid to Cambodia during the pandemic.

Diplomatic posts
Preceded by John Pilbeam	Australian High Commissioner to Vanuatu; 2009–2010	Succeeded by Jeff Roach
Preceded by Doug Trappett	Australian Ambassador to the United Arab Emirates; Australian Ambassador to Qatar; 2012–2016	Succeeded by Arthur Spyrou
Preceded by Angela Corcoran	Australian Ambassador to Cambodia; 2020–present	Incumbent
