= Lew Border =

Australian public servant and diplomat (1920–2011)

Lew Border AO LVO
- Born: Lewis Harold Border; 16 April 1920; Bundarra, New South Wales
- Died: 11 March 2011 (aged 90)
- Education: University of Sydney
- Occupations: Public servant, diplomat

Lewis Harold Border AO LVO (16 April 1920 – 11 March 2011) was an Australian public servant and diplomat. From 1977 to 1980, Border was Australian High Commissioner to New Zealand.

== Life and career ==
Lew Border was born on 16 April 1920 in Bundarra, New South Wales. He was the son of an Anglican clergyman, the Ven Archdeacon H. Border, of Gunnedah. The younger Border attended The Armidale School between 1934 and 1937, then University of Sydney at the New England College. He obtained a Bachelor of Arts.

Border enlisted in the Australian Army on 22 August 1942 at the rank of Bombardier. He was discharged on 20 April 1945. After his military service, Border joined the Department of External Affairs in 1945.

In January 1963 then External Affairs Minister Garfield Barwick announced Border's appointment as Australian Ambassador to Myanmar. In June 1966 then Minister for External Affairs Paul Hasluck announced that Border was to be Australian Ambassador to South Vietnam. Over the course of his two-year posting, Border described that he had seen a "noticeable strengthening" of South Vietnam's resolve to resist the challenge of Hanoi and the Vietcong.

Border's next post, starting 1968, was as High Commissioner to Pakistan. That year he was also appointed Australia's first Ambassador to Afghanistan whilst resident in Pakistan.

In 1977 Border was announced as the next Australian High Commissioner to New Zealand. The relationship between Australia and New Zealand at the time of his posting was seen by media as "rather uncertain".

Border died on 11 March 2001.

== Awards ==
Border was appointed a Lieutenant in the Royal Victorian Order during the Queen's visit to the Australian embassy in Washington in October 1957.

Border was named an Officer of the Order of Australia in January 1979 in recognition of his public service.

Diplomatic posts
Preceded by F.T. Homer as Chargé d'affaires	Australian Ambassador to Myanmar; 1963–1965	Succeeded by Frank Milne
Preceded by H.D. Anderson	Australian Ambassador to Vietnam; 1966–1968	Succeeded by Ralph Harry
Preceded by Bill Cutts as High Commissioner to Pakistan	Australian High Commissioner to Pakistan; Australian Ambassador to Afghanistan; 1968–1970	Succeeded by Francis Hamilton Stuart
Preceded by Ralph Harry	Australian Ambassador to Germany; 1975–1977	Succeeded by Max Loveday
Preceded by Colin Moodie	Australian High Commissioner to New Zealand; 1977–1980	Succeeded by James Webster
