= James Ingram (diplomat) =

Australian diplomat (1928–2023)

James Ingram AO
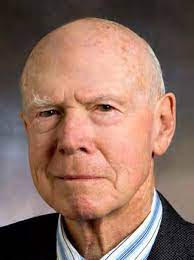
- Born: James Charles Ingram; 27 February 1928; Warragul, Victoria, Australia
- Died: 15 February 2023 (aged 94); Canberra, Australia
- Occupations: Public servant, diplomat and United Nations official at the World Food Programme
- Spouse: Odette Koven (m. 1950)
- Children: 3

James Charles Ingram AO (27 February 1928 – 15 February 2023) was an Australian diplomat, philanthropist and author whose career culminated in his post as the eighth executive director of the World Food Programme (WFP), a position which he occupied for ten years.

== Education ==
Ingram grew up in Melbourne, attending De La Salle College in Malvern having been awarded a Victorian Government Junior Scholarship. He won a Senior Government Scholarship to the University of Melbourne from which he graduated with a Bachelor of Arts degree in economics and political science. He undertook postgraduate studies at the Australian National University in Canberra in international relations.

== Diplomatic career ==
James Ingram was executive director of the World Food Programme, a major operational program of the United Nations system, from 1982 to 1992. He held the personal rank of UN Under Secretary General. He is the only Australian to have headed such a UN organisation. Before that appointment, Ingram was the chief executive officer of the Australian Development Assistance Bureau (ADAB), the second of several names applied over the years to the organisation managing Australia's international development assistance programs.

Ingram's career with the Department of External Affairs (as it was then known as) began in 1946 with his selection as a diplomatic cadet on the basis of competitive public written and oral examinations. He was the youngest appointed under the cadetship scheme. His first diplomatic appointment was to Tel Aviv (1950–53) following his marriage. Subsequent postings were to Washington DC (1956–59); Brussels (1959-60), where he was Charge d’affaires responsible for opening Australia's Mission to the then European Economic Community and Embassy to Belgium; Jakarta (1962–64); and the Australian Mission to the United Nations New York (1964–66). On return to Canberra, Ingram was Assistant Secretary in the Department of Foreign Affairs responsible for East and South Asia, the Americas, the South Pacific, and Asia and Pacific Council (ASPAC) affairs.

In 1970, Ingram was appointed Australian Ambassador to the Philippines and in 1973 Australian High Commissioner to Canada and concurrently non-resident High Commissioner in the then-newly independent Caribbean nations of Jamaica, Barbados, Guyana and the Bahamas, and Australian representative on the newly established, now defunct, International Bauxite Association.

== CEO of Australian aid program ==
Ingram's service in developing countries and at the United Nations, where he had been the Australian representative on the Executive Boards of UNICEF, UNDP and UNCTAD, had convinced him that Australia's development cooperation program and overseas trade policy were critical components of Australia's foreign policy, although they were not always sufficiently recognised as such by responsible ministers and top officials. He was therefore pleased to be appointed in 1975 to the newly created Australian Development Assistance Agency (ADAA) and in 1977 as head of the renamed agency ADAB (Australian Development Assistance Bureau). In seeking to improve the quality of Australia's bilateral aid and increase its support for selected multilateral aid organisations Ingram worked closely with Sir John Crawford. Their efforts ultimately led, inter alia, to the creation of the Australian Centre for International Agricultural Research (ACIAR), as well as more effective utilisation of the educational and research resources of Australian universities.

== United Nations career ==
Ingram served two five-year terms as executive director, i.e. chief executive, of the UN World Food Programme from 1982 to 1992. Under his leadership the organisation changed its focus from food for work and associated development projects to humanitarian assistance in support of victims of natural disasters and persons displaced by internal conflict and war. Today the WFP is the “world’s largest humanitarian agency” both in terms of the numbers helped and the cost of so doing. Most of the food distributed is bought from developing countries and much supplied to beneficiaries through cash vouchers. The transformation of WFP would not have been possible without the constitutional and other changes brought about over the course of Ingram's tenure: “Through his initiatives, each a tipping point in a ten-year deliberate strategy, Ingram laid the foundation for his successors to complete the transformation process”.

== Retirement ==
In retirement Ingram maintained his interest in international development, agricultural, and humanitarian aid issues and in Australian foreign policy. He was especially active in support of the Australian Institute of International Affairs (AIIA), the Crawford Fund, the ANU's Asia-Pacific College of Diplomacy and the University of New South Wales which established the Ingram Fund for International Law and Development in 2002 as a permanent endowment in the Faculty of Law. He advised Australian ministers personally and as a member of advisory committees on development and humanitarian issues including:

- 1994 – 96: Member, Aid Policy Advisory Committee to Minister for Development Cooperation and Pacific Affairs.
- 1994 – 95: Chairman, Non-Government Development Organisations Code of Practice Advisory Committee to Minister for Development Cooperation.
- Ingram has also served on numerous international boards and entities including:
- 1989 – 93: Member, International Commission on Peace and Food.
- 1988 – 94: Member, Governing Council, Society for International Development.
- 1994 – 95: Member, Commonwealth Inter-Governmental Group on the Global Humanitarian Order, London.
- 1994 – 95: Member, ESCAP Eminent Persons Panel, Bangkok, Thailand.
- 1995 – 99: Foundation Member, Board of Trustees, International Crisis Group, Brussels, Belgium.
- 1997: Resource Person, Conference on Humanitarian Operations and Peace-Keeping, Bangkok, Thailand.

Ingram died in Canberra on 15 February 2023, at the age of 94.

== Honours and awards ==
- 1984: Officer of the Order of Australia (AO), awarded for public service
- 1989: Joyce Pearce Memorial Lecture, Oxford University, Oxford, United Kingdom
- 1992: Alan Shawn Feinstein World Hunger Award, Brown University, Providence, RI, US
- 1992: Distinguished visitor, Watson Institute for International and Public Affairs, Brown University, Providence, RI, United States of America
- 2000: Inaugural Food for Life Award, United Nations World Food Programme, Rome, Italy
- 2010: Fellow of the Australian Institute of International Affairs (AIIA), Canberra
- 2017: Inaugural Patron, Crawford Fund, Canberra

== Publications ==
Articles

- 'Food and disaster relief: Issues of management and policy'. 1988. Jour of Disaster Studies and Management, 12 (1).
- 'Sustaining refugees' human dignity: International responsibility and practical reality'. 1989. Jour of Refugee Studies, 2 (3).
- 'The role of multilateral organisations: The African experience'. 1991. Outlook on Agriculture, 20 (4).
- 'The future architecture of international humanitarian assistance'. 1993. In Larry Minear and Thomas Weiss (eds.), Humanitarianism Across Borders, Boulder and London: Lynne Reinner.
- 'International humanitarian assistance'. 1993. Working Paper No. 138, Peace Research Centre, Australian National University.
- 'Development assistance and social change'. 1993. In Laksiri Jayasuriya and Michael Lee (eds.), Social Dimensions of Development, Bentley, W.A.: Paradigm Books.
- 'The politics of human suffering'. 1993. The National Interest, Spring, Washington D.C.
- 'The international response to humanitarian emergencies. 1994. In Kevin Clements and Robin Ward (eds.), Building International Community: Cooperating for Peace, St. Leonards, Sydney: Allen and Unwin.
- 'Development and the politics of aid'. 1994. Australian Retrospective on Aid, Australian National University.
- 'Feeding a more crowded, warmer and interdependent world: An enduring challenge for the United Nations'. 1995. Melbourne University Law Review, 20 (1).
- 'Re-thinking the future architecture for international humanitarian assistance'. 1997. In Nassrine Azimi (ed.), Humanitarian Action and Peace-keeping Operations, London, The Hague and Boston: Kluwer International Law.

Books

- Bread and Stones: Leadership and the Struggle to Reform the United Nations World Food Programme. Charleston, South Carolina, USA: BookSurge. 2007. ISBN 978-1-4196-2595-4.

Diplomatic posts
Preceded by Francis Hamilton Stuart	Australian Ambassador to the Philippines; 1970 – 1973	Succeeded by Peter Henderson
Preceded by David McNicol	Australian High Commissioner to Canada; 1973 – 1975	Succeeded by Max Loveday
New title Position established	Australian High Commissioner to Jamaica, Barbados, and Trinidad and Tobago; 1973 - 1974	Succeeded by John Hoyle
Preceded by Juan Felipe Yriart (acting)	Executive Director of the World Food Programme; 1982 – 1992	Succeeded by Catherine Bertini
