= List of ambassadors of Australia to Myanmar =

Ambassador of Australia to Myanmar

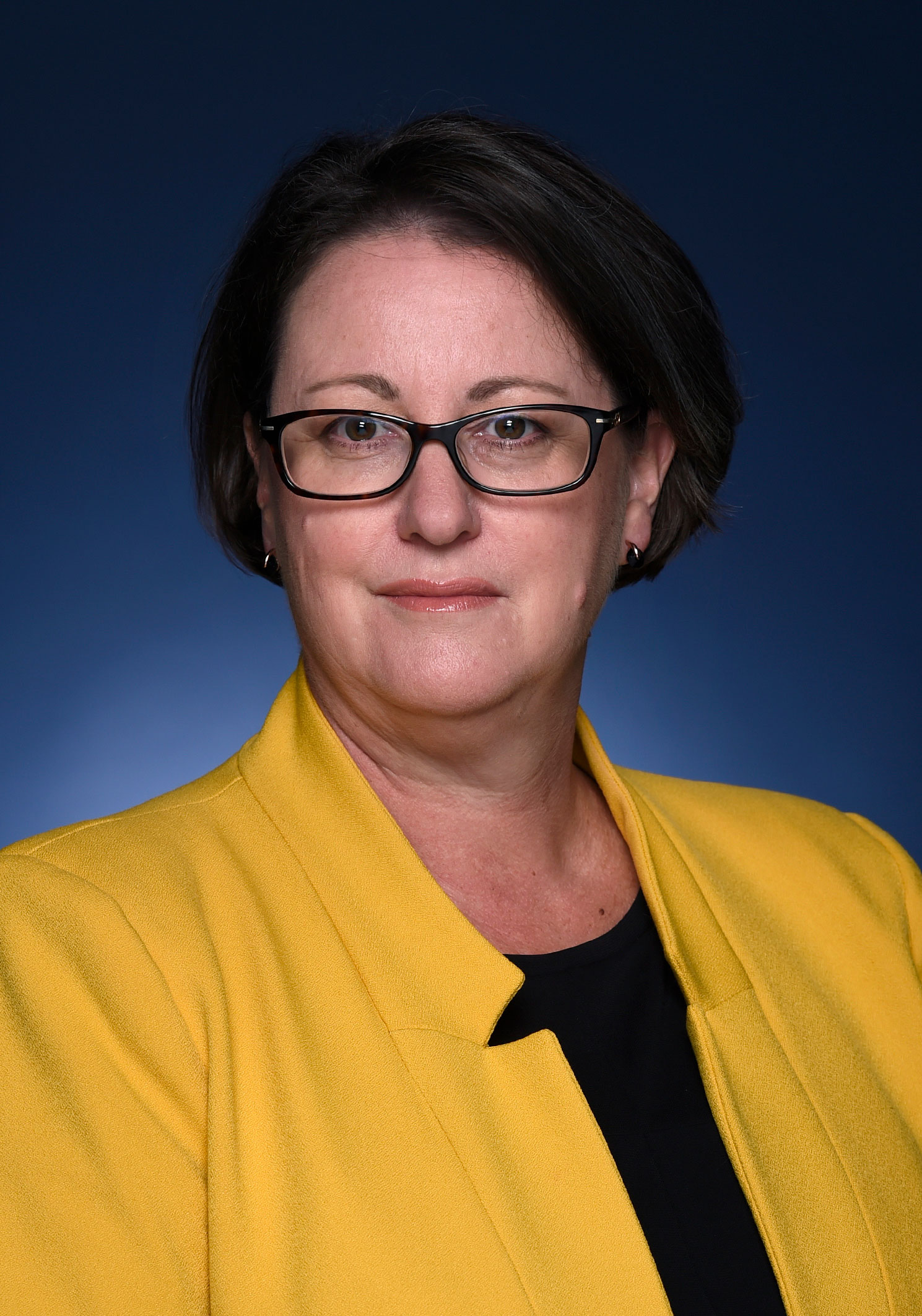
- Incumbent; Angela Corcoran (Chargé d'Affaires) since June 2022
- Department of Foreign Affairs and Trade
- Style: His Excellency
- Reports to: Minister for Foreign Affairs
- Nominator: Prime Minister of Australia
- Appointer: Governor General of Australia
- Inaugural holder: Colin Moodie
- Formation: 1956

The Ambassador of Australia to Myanmar is an officer of the Australian Department of Foreign Affairs and Trade and the head of the Embassy of the Commonwealth of Australia to the Republic of the Union of Myanmar. The Ambassador resides in Yangon.

The position of ambassador has been vacant since April 2022. It was subsequently reported, but not confirmed, that the Department of Foreign Affairs and Trade is considering suspending diplomatic relations with Myanmar as the Australian Government reportedly tries to avoid legitimising the 2021 coup d'état.

== List of heads of mission ==
Ordinal	Officeholder	Title	Term start date	Term end date	Time in office	Notes
(n/a)	Malcolm Booker	Charge d’Affaires	1952	1953	0–1 years	
1	Colin Moodie	Minister to Burma	1956	1956	0–1 years	
1	Colin Moodie	Ambassador of Australia to Burma	1956	1957	0–1 years	
2	Allan Loomes	Ambassador of Australia to Burma	1958	1961	2–3 years	
(n/a)	Frederick Homer	Chargé d'affaires	1962	1963	0–1 years	
3	Lew Border	Ambassador of Australia to Burma	1963	1965	1–2 years	
4	Frank Milne	Ambassador of Australia to Burma	1965	1966	0–1 years	
5	Marshall Johnston	Ambassador of Australia to Burma	1966	1967	0–1 years	
6	Roy Fernandez	Ambassador of Australia to Burma	1968	1969	0–1 years	
7	Richard Broinowski	Ambassador of Australia to Burma	1970	1971	0–1 years	
8	Walter Handmer	Ambassador of Australia to Burma	1972	1973	0–1 years	
9	Garry Woodard	Ambassador of Australia to Burma	1974	1976	1–2 years	
(n/a)	R. C. Whitty	Chargé d'affaires	1977	1977	0 years	
10	John Lavett	Ambassador of Australia to Myanmar	1977	1980	2–3 years	
11	Richard Gate	Ambassador of Australia to Myanmar	1980	1982	1–2 years	
(4)	Frank Milne	Ambassador of Australia to Myanmar	1983	1986	2–3 years	
12	Christopher Lamb	Ambassador of Australia to Myanmar	1986	1989	2–3 years	
13	Geoff Allen	Ambassador of Australia to Myanmar	1989	1993	3–4 years	
14	Stuart Hume	Ambassador of Australia to Myanmar	1993	1997	3–4 years	
15	Lyndall McLean	Ambassador of Australia to Myanmar	1997	2000	2–3 years	
16	Trevor Wilson	Ambassador of Australia to Myanmar	2000	2003	2–3 years	
17	Paul Grigson	Ambassador of Australia to Myanmar	2003	2005	1–2 years	
18	Bob Davis	Ambassador of Australia to Myanmar	2005	2008	2–3 years	
19	Michelle Chan	Ambassador of Australia to Myanmar	2008	2011	2–3 years	
20	Bronte Moules	Ambassador of Australia to Myanmar	2011	2015	3–4 years	
21	Nicholas Coppel	Ambassador of Australia to Myanmar	2015	2018	2–3 years	
22	Andrea Faulkner	Ambassador of Australia to Myanmar	February 2019	April 2022	3 years, 2 months	
(n/a)	Angela Corcoran	Charge d’Affaires	April 2022	incumbent	4 years, 7 months	
