= List of ambassadors of Australia to South Korea =

Ambassador of Australia to the Republic of Korea

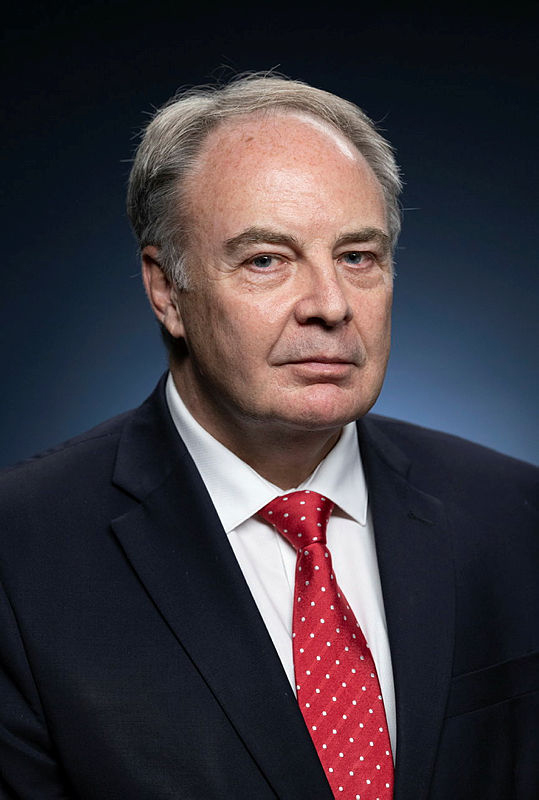
- Incumbent; Jeffrey Robinson since 9 December 2023
- Department of Foreign Affairs and Trade
- Style: Her Excellency
- Reports to: Minister for Foreign Affairs
- Nominator: Prime Minister of Australia
- Appointer: Governor General of Australia
- Inaugural holder: John Petherbridge (as Chargé d'Affaires)
- Formation: 5 June 1962
- Website: Australian Embassy, Republic of Korea

The Australian Embassy is on the 19th floor of the Kyobo Life Insurance Building, Seoul.

The ambassador of Australia to the Republic of Korea is an officer of the Australian Department of Foreign Affairs and Trade and the head of the Embassy of the Commonwealth of Australia to the Republic of Korea (South Korea). The position has the rank and status of an ambassador extraordinary and plenipotentiary and holds non-resident accreditation with the Democratic People's Republic of Korea (North Korea).

The current ambassador, since December 2023, is Jeffrey Robinson. The Republic of Korea and Australia have enjoyed diplomatic relations since 1961. In June 1962, Australia opened an embassy in Seoul, and after establishing diplomatic relations with North Korea in 1974, Australia opened an embassy in Pyongyang in April 1975. The embassy closed in November 1975 and relations weren't resumed until May 2000, and the embassy in Seoul has been accredited to North Korea since August 2008, the same time accreditation with Mongolia was transferred from the Embassy in Beijing. The Australian Government established an embassy and appointed a resident ambassador to Mongolia in 2015.

== List of heads of mission ==
Ordinal	Officeholder	Title	Term start date	Term end date	Time in office	Notes
(n/a)	John Petherbridge	Chargé d'Affaires	5 June 1962	August 1963	1 year, 1 month	
(n/a)	Geoffrey Brady	Chargé d'Affaires	26 August 1963	February 1964	5 months	
1	Roy Albert Peachey	Ambassador of Australia to the Republic of Korea	21 February 1964	19 June 1968	4 years, 119 days	
2	Allan Loomes	Ambassador of Australia to the Republic of Korea	19 June 1968	20 September 1971	3 years, 93 days	
3	Murray Bourchier	Ambassador of Australia to the Republic of Korea	7 December 1971	28 January 1975	3 years, 52 days	
4	John Roger Holdich	Ambassador of Australia to the Republic of Korea	31 March 1975	30 April 1976	1 year, 30 days	
5	Donald Jame Horne	Ambassador of Australia to the Republic of Korea	17 June 1976	22 June 1978	2 years, 5 days	
6	Geoff Miller	Ambassador of Australia to the Republic of Korea	14 July 1978	29 June 1980	1 year, 351 days	
7	Ted Pocock	Ambassador of Australia to the Republic of Korea	12 August 1980	10 February 1984	3 years, 182 days	
8	Lance Louis Ettelson Joseph	Ambassador of Australia to the Republic of Korea	12 April 1984	August 1987	3 years, 3 months	
9	Richard Broinowski	Ambassador of Australia to the Republic of Korea	28 October 1987	19 December 1989	2 years, 52 days	
10	Darren Gribble	Ambassador of Australia to the Republic of Korea	27 February 1990	December 1993	3 years, 9 months	
11	Mack Williams	Ambassador of Australia to the Republic of Korea	7 March 1994	26 March 1998	4 years, 19 days	
12	Anthony Hely	Ambassador of Australia to the Republic of Korea	March 1998	June 2001	3 years, 3 months	
13	Colin Heseltine	Ambassador of Australia to the Republic of Korea	1 August 2001	9 December 2005	4 years, 4 months	
14	Peter Brock Rowe	Ambassador of Australia to the Republic of Korea	December 2005	February 2009	3 years, 2 months	
15	Sam Gerovich	Ambassador of Australia to the Republic of Korea	March 2009	16 March 2013	4 years	
16	Bill Paterson	Ambassador of Australia to the Republic of Korea	16 March 2013	December 2016	3 years, 8 months	
17	James Choi	Ambassador of Australia to the Republic of Korea	December 2016	December 2020	4 years	
18	Catherine Raper	Ambassador of Australia to the Republic of Korea	17 February 2021	December 2023	2 years, 10 months	
19	Jeffrey Robinson	Ambassador of Australia to the Republic of Korea	9 December 2023	incumbent	2 years	

== See also ==
- Australia–South Korea relations
- Foreign relations of Australia
