= Julia Feeney =

Australian diplomat

Julia Feeney is an Australian diplomat who serves as Deputy Head of Mission to Thailand and the Permanent Representative to the United Nations Economic and Social Commission for Asia and the Pacific UN(ESCAP) in Thailand since July 2021.

Feeney served as the Ambassador to Serbia and non-resident in Macedonia and Montenegro from 2013 until 2018. In 2016, she was given the Serbian award Najžena XXI veka which recognizes her as "the best woman in the 21st century".

She attended Flinders University where she earned a Bachelor's of Economics.
