= Graham Feakes =

Australian public servant and diplomat (1930–1994)

Graham Feakes AO
- Born: Graham Barton Feakes; 20 March 1930; Adelaide, South Australia
- Died: 3 December 1994 (aged 64); Sydney, New South Wales
- Occupations: Public servant, diplomat

Graham Barton Feakes AO (20 March 1930 – 3 December 1994) was an Australian public servant and diplomat. From 1984 to 1990, Feakes was Australian High Commissioner to India.

== Life and career ==
Feakes, born in Adelaide on 20 March 1930, joined the Australian Public Service in the Department of External Affairs in 1951. He said that his motivation for joining the department was in part due to years spent traveling widely for his father's work as a child.

In 1969, Feakes became Australian Ambassador to Cambodia. During his time as ambassador in Phnom Penh, he felt some level of anxiety and concern for his family's safety.

From 1972 to 1974, Feakes was assistant secretary in charge of policy research at the Department of Foreign Affairs. He was then promoted to first assistant secretary of the South Asia division in 1974.

Between 1976 and 1980, Feakes was the Australian High Commissioner to Malaysia.

In 1984, Feakes was appointed Australian High Commissioner to India and non-resident ambassador to Nepal. After his appointment ended in 1990, he was made Chairman of the first Australia-India Council Board in 1992.

Feakes died at his home in Sydney on 3 December 1994, at the age of 64.

== Awards ==
In January 1985, Feakes was made an Officer of the Order of Australia in recognition of service to the Public Service as a diplomat representative and in the development of Australian relations with South and South East Asia.

Diplomatic posts
Preceded by Noël Deschamps	Australian Ambassador to Cambodia; 1969–1972	Succeeded by Marshall Johnston
Preceded by Alfred Parsons	Australian High Commissioner to Malaysia; 1976–1980	Succeeded by Garry Woodard
Preceded by Gordon Upton	Australian High Commissioner to India; 1984–1990	Succeeded by David Evans
