= Bill Cutts =

Australian diplomat

- Born: Trevett Wakeham Cutts; 28 May 1914
- Died: October 2003
- Education: University of Melbourne (LLB)
- Occupations: Public servant, diplomat
- Spouse: Maidie

Trevett Wakeham "Bill" Cutts (28 May 1914 – October 2003) was an Australian public servant and diplomat.

Educated at Melbourne High School and the University of Melbourne, Cutts joined the Department of External Affairs in 1946, after serving during World War II in the navy.

Cutts was Australian Ambassador to the Philippines from 1963 to 1966. During his time at the post, the two countries signed a free trade agreement granting each most-favoured-nation rights to the other.

Diplomatic posts
Vacant Title last held by Brian Hill as Chargé d'Affaires	Australian Ambassador to the Soviet Union (Chargé d'Affaires); 1959–1960	Succeeded by Keith Waller as Ambassador
Preceded by Melville Marshall	Australian Consul-General at San Francisco; 1960–1962	Succeeded by Frederick Homer
Preceded by Alfred Stirling	Australian Ambassador to the Philippines; 1963–1966	Succeeded by Francis Hamilton Stuart
Preceded by David McNicol	Australian High Commissioner to Pakistan; 1966–1969	Succeeded by Lew Border
Preceded by Charles Kevin	Australian Ambassador to South Africa; 1968–1972	Succeeded by Colin Moodie
Preceded by Hubert Opperman	Australian High Commissioner to Malta; 1972–1975	Succeeded by Ian Nicholson
