= Michelle Chan (diplomat) =

Australian diplomat

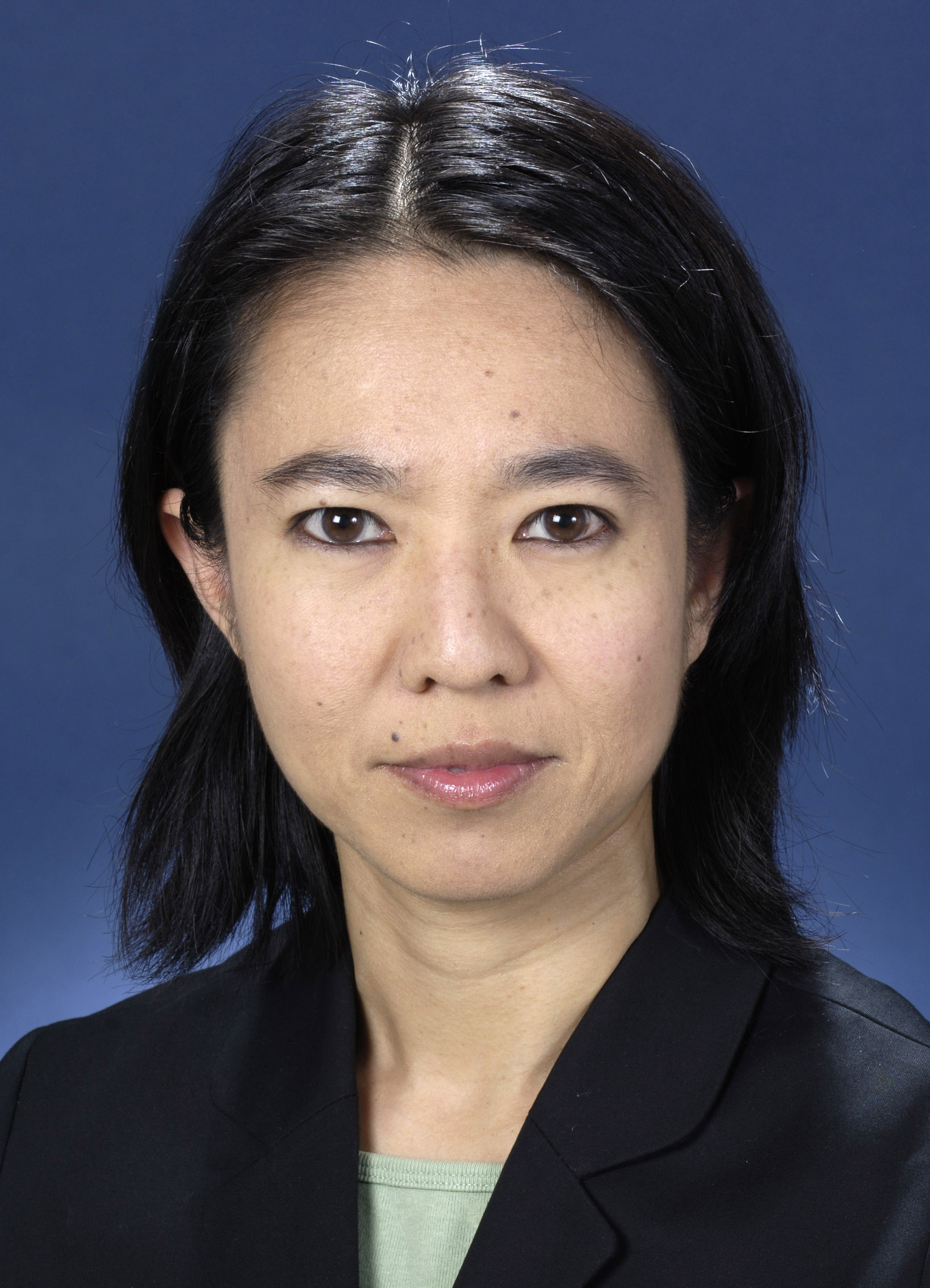
Michelle Chan

Michelle Chan is an Australian career diplomat who served as Ambassador to Myanmar from May 2008 until January 2011. Chan served as National Security Adviser to former Prime Minister Scott Morrison. In April 2020, Chan was promoted to deputy secretary in the Office of National Intelligence. She is currently a Deputy Secretary in the Australian Department of Foreign Affairs and Trade.

Chan earned a Bachelor of Arts (Jurisprudence) and Bachelor of Laws from the University of Adelaide, and a Master of Arts and Master of Laws (International Law) from the Australian National University.
