= John Petherbridge =

Australian public servant and diplomat

- Born: 22 August 1920
- Died: 25 October 2013 (aged 93)
- Education: University of Sydney (LLB)
- Occupations: Public servant, diplomat
- Spouse: Anne Crosby (m. 1951; died 2012)

John D. Petherbridge (22 August 1920 – 25 October 2013) was an Australian public servant and diplomat.

Diplomatic posts
New title Position established	Australian Ambassador to South Korea (Chargé d'affaires); 1962–1963	Succeeded by Geoffrey Brady as Chargé d'affaires
Preceded by Roy Peachey	Australian Ambassador to Sweden; Australian Ambassador to Norway; Australian Ambassador to Finland; 1972–1975	Succeeded by Lance Barnard
Preceded by Arthur Morris	Australian Ambassador to Afghanistan; Australian Ambassador to Pakistan; 1976–1980	Succeeded by Walter Handmer
