= Colin Moodie =

Australian public servant and diplomat

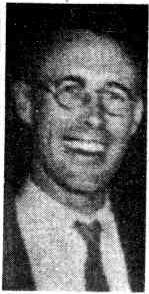
- Image of Moodie published in 1954.
- Born: Colin Troup Moodie; 5 April 1913; Wollstonecraft, New South Wales, New South Wales
- Died: 6 February 2000 (aged 86); Adelaide, South Australia
- Education: University of Adelaide (LLB)
- Occupations: Public servant, diplomat

Colin Troup Moodie (5 April 1913 – 6 February 2000) was an Australian public servant and diplomat.

== Life and career ==
Moodie was born on 5 April 1913 in Wollstonecraft, New South Wales. In 1920, when Moodie was seven, he and his family moved to Adelaide so that Moodie's father could take a bank manager role.

Moodie was educated at St Peter's College, Adelaide, achieving a scholarship to St. Mark's College at the University of Adelaide after being named dux of his class. Moodie graduated from the university in 1934 with a Bachelor of Laws.

He began a legal career and was associate to Herbert Angas Parsons before resigning in 1937 to take up an appointment at the Department of External Affairs as a clerk.

In 1944 Moodie was appointed official secretary to the first Australian High Commissioner to India Iven Mackay. Moodie was one of several officers responsible for setting up the new mission in Delhi.

Moodie was appointed Australia's first Minister to Burma in 1954.

From 1972 to 1975, Moodie was Australian Ambassador to South Africa.

Moodie died in Adelaide on 6 February 2000.

Diplomatic posts
Preceded by Malcolm Booker as Charge d'Affaires	Australian Minister to Burma; 1954–1956	Succeeded by Allan Loomes
Preceded by Malcolm Booker as Charge d'Affaires	Australian Ambassador to Burma; 1956–1957	Succeeded by Allan Loomes
Preceded by Roden Cutler	Australian Ambassador to the Netherlands; 1966–1970	Succeeded by Lloyd Thomson
Preceded by Bill Cutts	Australian High Commissioner to South Africa; 1972–1975	Succeeded by David McNicol
Preceded by Brian Clarence Hill	Australian High Commissioner to New Zealand; 1975–1977	Succeeded by Lew Border
