= List of high commissioners of Australia to Vanuatu =

High Commissioner of Australia to Vanuatu

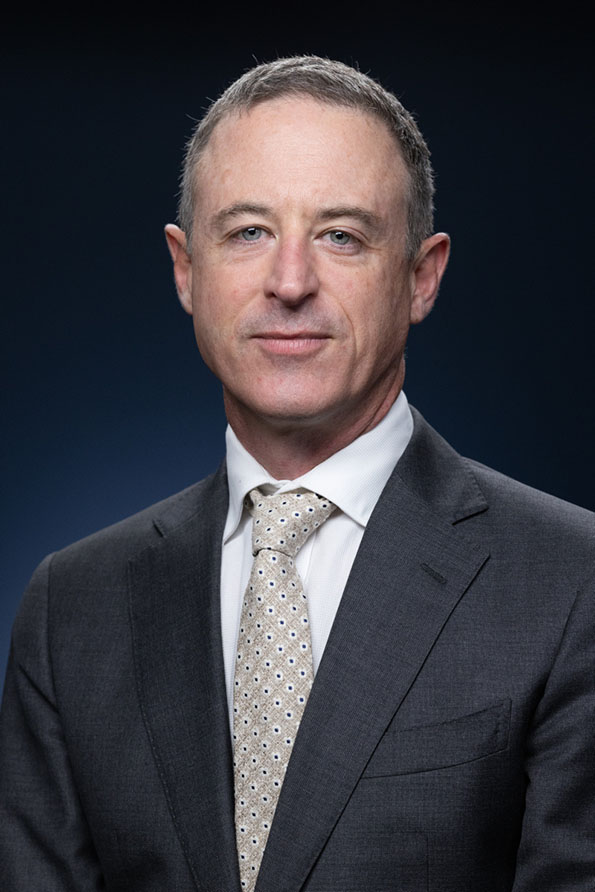
- Incumbent; Max Willis since 3 July 2024
- Department of Foreign Affairs and Trade
- Style: His Excellency
- Reports to: Minister for Foreign Affairs
- Residence: Port Vila
- Nominator: Prime Minister of Australia
- Appointer: Governor General of Australia
- Inaugural holder: Michael Ovington
- Formation: July 1980

The high commissioner of Australia to Vanuatu is an officer of the Australian Department of Foreign Affairs and Trade and the head of the High Commission of the Commonwealth of Australia in Vanuatu. The position has the rank and status of an ambassador extraordinary and plenipotentiary and is currently held by Sarah de Zoeten since January 2020. There has been a resident Australian high commissioner in Vanuatu since July 1980 when the New Hebrides gained independence as a republic in the Commonwealth of Nations. Australia was the first country to establish a foreign mission in Port Vila, in 1978.

== High commissioners ==
#	Officeholder	Term start date	Term end date	Time in office	Notes
1	Mike Ovington	1980	1983	2–3 years	
2	Joan Norwood	1983	1985	1–2 years	
3	Greg Urwin	1985	1988	2–3 years	
4	Keith Baker	1988	1990	1–2 years	
5	David Ambrose	1990	1992	1–2 years	
6	Peter Shannon	1992	1996	3–4 years	
7	Alan Edwards	1996	1999	2–3 years	
8	Perry Head	1999	2002	2–3 years	
9	Stephen Waters	2002	2005	2–3 years	
10	John Pilbeam	2005	2009	3–4 years	
11	Pablo Kang	2009	2010	0–1 years	
12	Jeff Roach	2010	2012	1–2 years	
13	Jeremy Bruer	2012	2017	4–5 years	
14	Jenny Da Rin	2017	2019	1–2 years	
15	Sarah de Zoeten	21 January 2020	incumbent	6 years, 229 days	
