= Francis Hamilton Stuart =

Australian public servant and diplomat

Francis Stuart
- Born: Francis Hamilton Stuart; 20 July 1912; Melbourne, Victoria
- Died: 1 February 2007 (aged 94)
- Education: University of Oxford
- Occupations: Public servant, diplomat
- Spouse: Guinevere Dingley (m. 1938)

Francis Hamilton Stuart (20 July 1912 – 1 February 2007) was a former Australian public servant and diplomat.

== Early life and education ==
Stuart was born in Melbourne on 20 July 1912. His parents separated when he was 8 years old and he went to live in Sydney with his mother as a child. He later boarded at Geelong Grammar School and went on to higher education at Oxford University.

== Career ==
He began his career in the 1930s as a consular officer in the British Legation in Bangkok. He shifted to the Australian Department of External Affairs in 1941. In 1942, he enlisted in the Australian Army to serve during World War II.

Between 1964 and 1957 Stuart was chief of protocol in the external affairs department in Canberra.

In May 1957, Stuart, along with his wife and children, left Canberra for Phnom Penh to take up his appointment as Australian Minister to Cambodia. His nomination had been approved by King Norodom Suramarit in April that year. The Australian Legation in Phnom Penh was raised to Embassy status in 1959 and Stuart became Ambassador.

Prime Minister Robert Menzies announced Stuart's appointment as Ambassador to the United Arab Republic in November 1961.

In May 1970 Stuart was appointed High Commissioner to Pakistan, with concurrent accreditation to Afghanistan. He left the Philippines in July 1970 to take up the post. Whilst resident in Pakistan, Stuart saw the partition of Pakistan.

In 1973, Stuart became the first resident Australian Ambassador to Poland.

== Retirement and later life ==
In December 1989 Stuart's book Towards Coming of Age was published by Griffith University.

In his retirement, Stuart advocated for Australia to become a republic.

Stuart died on 1 February 2007.

Diplomatic posts
Preceded by Frederick Blakeney	Australian Minister to Cambodia; 1957–1959	Succeeded by Noël Deschamps
Preceded by Frederick Blakeney	Australian Ambassador to Cambodia; 1959–1962	Succeeded by Noël Deschamps
Preceded by John Quinn	Australian Ambassador to the United Arab Republic; 1961–1966	Succeeded by L.J. Lawrey
Preceded by Bill Cutts	Australian Ambassador to the Philippines; 1966–1970	Succeeded by James Ingram
Preceded by Lew Border	Australian High Commissioner to Pakistan; 1972	Succeeded by Arthur Morris
Preceded by Lew Border	Australian Ambassador to Pakistan; 1972–73	Succeeded by Arthur Morris
Preceded by L.J. Lawrey	Australian Ambassador to Poland; 1973–1977	Succeeded by Bob Laurie
New title	Australian Ambassador to East Germany; 1973–1975	Succeeded by Philip Peters as Chargé d'Affaires
