= Australian High Commissioner to Trinidad and Tobago =

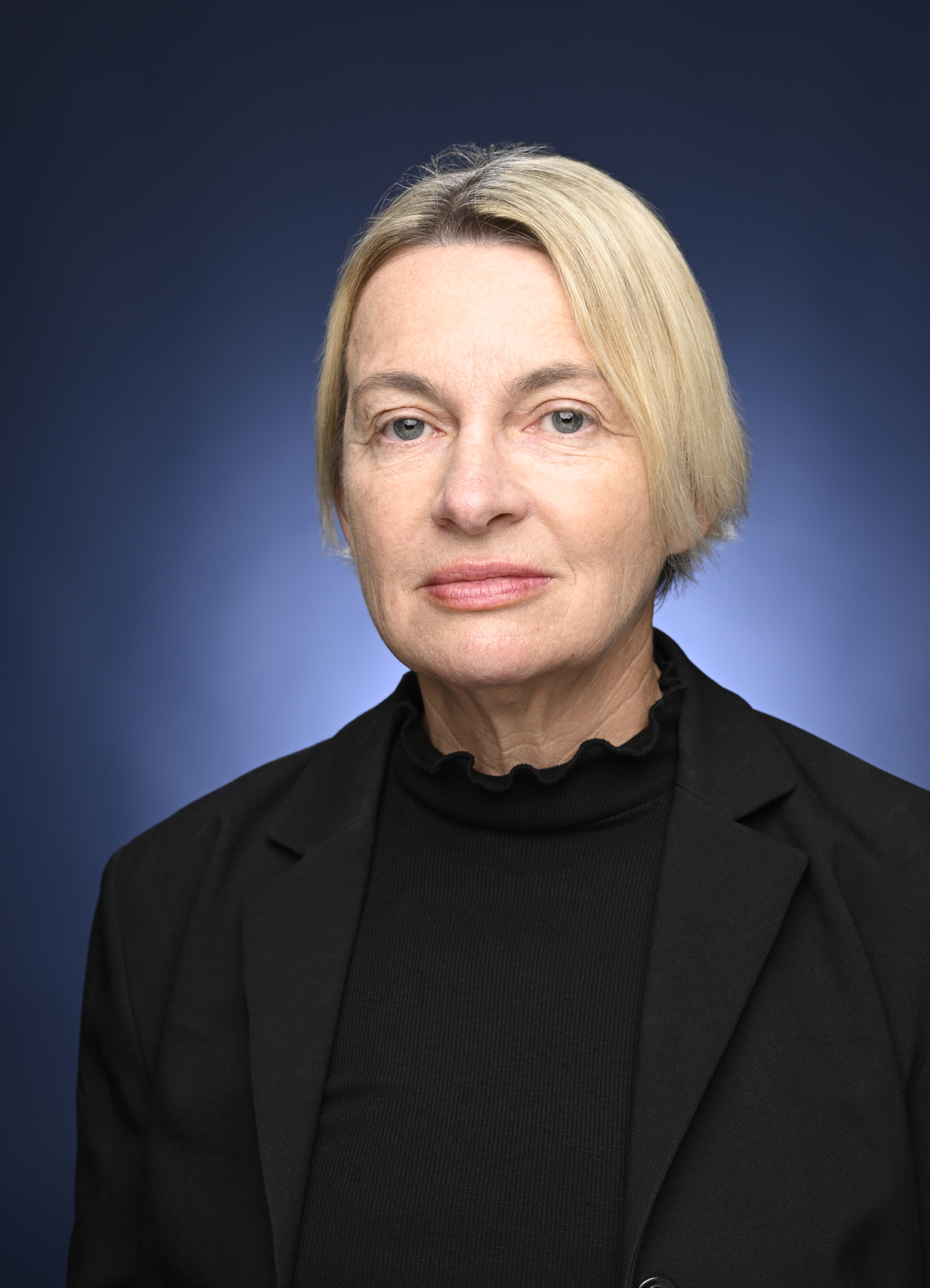
- Incumbent; Sonya Koppe since 16 March 2023
- Department of Foreign Affairs and Trade
- Style: Her Excellency
- Reports to: Minister of Foreign Affairs
- Seat: Port of Spain
- Nominator: Prime Minister of Australia
- Appointer: Governor General of Australia
- Inaugural holder: James Ingram (Non-resident High Commissioner, located in Ottawa)

The Australian high commissioner to Trinidad and Tobago is an officer of the Australian Department of Foreign Affairs and Trade and the head of the high commission of the Commonwealth of Australia in the Republic of Trinidad and Tobago. The position has the rank and status of an ambassador extraordinary and plenipotentiary and the high commissioner resides in Port of Spain. The high commissioner, since March 2023, has been Sonya Koppe.

== Posting history ==
The Australian government established a high commission in Port of Spain in May 2004 and appointed its first resident High Commissioner, John Michell. Previously, responsibility for Australian diplomatic representation in Trinidad and Tobago was held in Canada (1974); Jamaica (1975–1994); and Barbados (1994–2004). The decision to move Australian Government representation from Barbados to Trinidad and Tobago was part of a review of Australia's diplomatic network completed in July 2003.

== List of high commissioners ==
#	Officeholder	Residency	Term start date	Term end date	Time in office	Notes
1	James Ingram	Ottawa, Canada	1974	1974	0 years	
2	John Hoyle	Kingston, Jamaica	1975	1977	1–2 years	
3	Brian Hickey	Kingston, Jamaica	1978	1979	0–1 years	
4	Gordon Bilney	Kingston, Jamaica	1980	1981	0–1 years	
5	R. E. Little	Kingston, Jamaica	1982	1984	1–2 years	
6	Michael Landale	Kingston, Jamaica	1985	1987	1–2 years	
7	Ian Wille	Kingston, Jamaica	1988	1989	0–1 years	
8	Peter Rogers	Kingston, Jamaica	1990	1994	3–4 years	
9	Bob Whitty	Bridgetown, Barbados	1994	1998	3–4 years	
10	Paul Smith	Bridgetown, Barbados	1998	2001	2–3 years	
11	Winfred Peppinck	Bridgetown, Barbados	2001	2004	2–3 years	
12	John Michell	Port of Spain	2004	2007	2–3 years	
13	Philip Kentwell	Port of Spain	2007	2013	5–6 years	
14	Ross Tysoe	Port of Spain	2013	2016	2–3 years	
15	John Pilbeam	Port of Spain	2016	2019	2–3 years	
16	Bruce Lendon	Port of Spain	2019	2023	4 years	
17	Sonya Koppe	Port of Spain	March 16, 2023	incumbent	1274 days	
