= John Holloway (diplomat) =

Australian public servant and diplomat

- Born: 19 February 1943; Deniliquin, New South Wales
- Died: 12 March 2013 (aged 70); Phnom Penh, Cambodia
- Education: University of New South Wales (MA)
- Occupations: Public servant, diplomat, adviser
- Children: 3 daughters, 2 sons

John Holloway (19 February 1943 – 12 March 2013) was an Australian public servant and diplomat and an advisor to the Cambodian Government. Over his career he played a key role in the Cambodian peace process, including during his time as Australian Ambassador to Cambodia from 1992 to 1994.

During his career as a diplomat, Holloway took a close interest in Southeast Asian affairs. His career highlights included the following:

- Third Secretary in the Australian Embassy in Jakarta (March 1966 to March 1968)
- First Secretary in the Australian High Commission in Kuala Lumpur (September 1970 to September 1973)
- Counsellor in the Australian High Commission in Port Moresby (December 1973 to December 1975)
- Deputy High Commissioner, Australian High Commission in New Delhi (February 1979 to January 1981)
- Minister in the Australian Embassy in Jakarta (January 1981 to May 1983)
- Australian Ambassador to the Philippines (December 1986 to March 1989)
- Deputy Director General in AIDAB, Australian International Development Assistance Bureau (April 1989 to November 1991)
- Permanent Representative to the Supreme National Council of Cambodia and later Australian Ambassador to Cambodia (November 1991 to July 1993)

In June 1995, Victorian MP Ken Aldred claimed in Parliament that Holloway was a paedophile. The then Secretary to of the Department of Foreign Affairs and Trade Michael Costello told Fran Kelly in a media interview that police had investigated and said there was no evidence to support the allegation. Holloway was arrested in Cambodia and brought back to Australia to face charges, including for having sex with a 14-year-old boy. Holloway denied the charge. A magistrate dismissed child sex abuse charges against Holloway, calling the testimony of the chief witness "worthless".

Holloway later returned to Cambodia, remaining active as an adviser to the Cambodian government and working with numerous international bodies and non-government organisations. He died in Cambodia in March 2013 after a battle with skin cancer and diabetes.

Diplomatic posts
Preceded by Roy Fernandez	Australian Ambassador to the Philippines; 1986–1989	Succeeded by Mack Williams
Vacant Title last held by Frank Milne as Chargé d'affaires, 1975	Australian Ambassador to Cambodia; 1992–1994	Succeeded by Tony Kevin
