= Walter Handmer =

Australian public servant and diplomat

Walter Handmer AM
- Born: Walter Philip John Handmer; Bunbury, Western Australia
- Died: 2007; Canberra, Australian Capital Territory
- Education: University of Western Australia
- Occupations: Public servant, diplomat
- Spouse: Norma

Walter Philip John Handmer AM (died 2007) was an Australian public servant and diplomat.

Handmer was born in Bunbury, Western Australia.

Handmer joined the Department of External Affairs in 1951 as a cadet. Cadets were enrolled for one year of study at the Canberra University College School of Diplomatic Studies, followed by training that included language training in some cases. After completing their cadetship, Cadets were advanced to the rank of Third Secretary. In December 1953, Handmer and his wife left Canberra so that he could join the Australian diplomatic mission in Hong Kong. Whilst in Hong Kong, Handmer enrolled to study Mandarin at the Hong Kong University Language School.

In 1966, Handmer was Australia's Charge d'affaires in Taiwan, charged with 'paving the way' for the arrival of the appointed Ambassador Frank Bell Cooper.

From 1974 to 1977, Handmer was Australian High Commissioner to Kenya. His non-resident ambassadorial accreditations while on post in Kenya were Uganda, Ethiopia and the Seychelles. Haile Selassie, then Emperor of Ethiopia, received Handmer's credentials over a bowl of roses, flanked by guards with live cheetahs. A brass band played a rendition of Waltzing Matilda when he presented his credentials to Idi Amin, then President of Uganda. In 1977 Handmer was appointed Australian Ambassador to Israel.

Handmer was made a Member of the Order of Australia in the 1987 Australia Day Awards.

Handmer died in Canberra in 2007.

Diplomatic posts
Preceded by Richard Broinowski	Australian Ambassador to Myanmar; 1972–1973	Succeeded by Garry Woodard
Preceded by K.H. Rogers	Australian High Commissioner to Kenya; Australian Ambassador to Ethiopia; 1974–1977	Succeeded by Hugh Dunn
Preceded by Richard Smith	Australian Ambassador to Israel; 1977–1980	Succeeded by David Goss
Preceded by John Petherbridge	Australian High Commissioner to Pakistan; 1981–1984	Succeeded by I.G. Bowden
Preceded by Kenneth McDonald	Australian High Commissioner to Singapore; 1983–1988	Succeeded by M Rosaleen McGovern
