= Ralph Harry =

Australian jurist and diplomat

Ralph Harry AC, CBE

Australian High Commissioner to Singapore
- In office 1956–1957
- Preceded by: Alan Watt
- Succeeded by: David McNicol

Australian Ambassador to Vietnam
- In office 1968–1970
- Preceded by: Lew Border
- Succeeded by: Arthur Morris

Australian Ambassador to the Federal Republic of Germany
- In office 1971–1974
- Preceded by: Edward Ronald Walker
- Succeeded by: Lew Border

Permanent Representative of Australia to the United Nations
- In office 1975–1978
- Preceded by: Laurence McIntyre
- Succeeded by: Harold David Anderson

Personal details
- Born: Ralph Lindsay Harry; 10 March 1917 Geelong, Victoria, Australia
- Died: 7 October 2002 (aged 85) St Leonards, New South Wales, Australia
- Education: Launceston Grammar School
- Alma mater: University of Tasmania; Lincoln College, Oxford
- Occupation: Public servant, diplomat

Ralph Lindsay Harry AC, CBE (10 March 1917 – 7 October 2002) was one of Australia's pioneer diplomats and intelligence specialists. He was recognised as a skilled diplomatic professional with a mastery of the traditional conventions and methods of diplomacy and politics. Having acted early in his career for three years as Director of the Australian Secret Intelligence Service, he was also known as an insightful intelligence analyst and cryptographer.

Harry was the Acting Head of the Department of External Affairs and concluded his career as Australia's Ambassador to the United Nations. He made a lifelong emotional commitment to the promotion of the interests of Australia and the betterment of his fellow men and women through the promotion of international law and institutions. There was little he did or said that was not aimed in this direction.

== Family, youth and education ==
Ralph Harry was born in Geelong, Victoria on 10 March 1917, the youngest of four children. The son of Arthur Hartley Harry, a senior classics master at the Geelong College, and Ethel Roby Holder; the family's circumstances were modest. Harry was brought up to be frugal, reticent and hardworking and in an atmosphere of reverence for academic achievement and the value of education. The family was Presbyterian and teetotal. Harry's mother was a committed Woman's Christian Temperance Unionist. Harry's father moved to Launceston, Tasmania in 1923 to become classics master of Launceston Grammar School. As he wanted to build a house for the family in Launceston, it was decided that his wife and the children would go to Adelaide to live with Ethel's mother, Lady Holder, the widow of Sir Frederick Holder. Sir Frederick was a journalist and preacher in the mining town of Burra. He ultimately became Premier of South Australia. As a consequence of his deep involvement in the Federal movement in Australia in the last twenty years of the 19th Century, he was appointed as the first Speaker of the first Federal House of Representatives in 1901 before dying suddenly, in Melbourne, during a loud parliamentary debate in 1909. Sir Frederick was to become the most prominent role model in Harry's life. Harry attributed his commitment to public service to Sir Frederick's example of tireless and effective commitment to church and State and he was, throughout his life, proud of all that Sir Frederick had achieved.

The family was reunited in 1923 after the completion of Arthur's house in Mowbray Heights, on the banks of the Tamar River. There followed a period of tranquillity and achievement in Harry's life. He was placed in Launceston Grammar School as a student in 1924 and was dux of his class in every year he spent at the school. Although he was a fine mathematician, his father's financial circumstances, and the bursaries that classics distinctions provided, required him to follow the non-science stream. Harry also found time for wide sporting involvement, representing his school in football, athletics and swimming. Harry left school in 1934 after receiving the award for the best all-round scholar, sportsman and leader and winning a general university scholarship. He sat for the Commonwealth Public Service exam and came first in Tasmania and second in Australia. He became a clerk in the Hobart ordnance stores, a job he held during his undergraduate studies in law at the University of Tasmania in Hobart. During the Hobart period, Harry became involved in the Presbyterian Church and the Australian Christian Students’ movement, and was a member of the University Student Representative Council.

Harry graduated with first class honours in law in 1938 and applied for and was awarded the Tasmanian Rhodes Scholarship. He arrived in Oxford to undertake his BA in early 1939 after working his way to England on a cargo boat for one shilling a month. He took up residence in Lincoln College, where John Wesley, the founder of the Methodist Church, had his rooms in the 19th Century. As a Rhodes scholar, Harry was expected to contribute to the sporting life of the college and found his niche in rowing. He competed in the “bumps” and succeeded in moving the College up the river. He became Captain of Boats at Lincoln and was invited to trial for the Oxford “blue” boat, but declined, to concentrate on finishing his degree as rapidly as possible with the onset of war in Europe becoming more likely all the time. He also became a correspondent for Isis, the Oxford University newspaper.

Harry had been attracted to evangelical Christianity in his youth and continued that interest through University. He made a quick visit to Amsterdam and The Hague in the summer of 1939 to a World Christian Youth Movement congress. In one of his many letters to his family during this period, he recounted how he visited the Hall of Justice of the Palace of Peace on 29 August 1939, the day on which the Dutch Government mobilised its armed forces for the Second World War. He described the scene of panic on the streets during the mobilization and the desertion of the Hall of Justice. He explained to his family that, as he stood in the empty building, he promised himself that:

“I for one would not lose faith in the ultimate triumph of Peace and Justice for which the Palace of Peace has been and shall again be in the centre.”

He spent the rest of his life working in one way or another to realize that ideal. He maintained a profound belief in the banishment of all forms of war, poverty and oppression; but rather than repeat high principle he recognized that he would need to devote himself to particular spheres of activity where he felt able to make change. These included the promotion of collective security between nations through the United Nations; the foundation and development of regional groupings in the economic and security area; the development and enforcement of international law, particularly in trade, the rights of refugees and human rights; and the promotion of education. He was also convinced of the necessity for the involvement of youth in all of these policy arenas and was always willing to consider new and radical ideas.

== Professional career ==
The outbreak of war complicated the completion of Harry's studies as many of his lecturers and tutors were rushing to enlist. He was however able to complete his degree in 1940 and after an unsuccessful attempt (because of his poor eyesight) to join the British army he returned to Australia to join the recently formed Department of External Affairs. He decided in 1942 that his responsibility was to join the AIF, which he did. He served as an officer in military intelligence until 1943. Most of his wartime experience was in New Guinea. He was then recalled to the Department of External Affairs to be posted to the Australian High Commission in Ottawa, Canada where he worked from 1943 to 1945.

The Allied powers convened a conference in 1945 in San Francisco to agree on the basis for the formation of an international organization for the promotion of international peace and security. This was to bring into effect the proposals for global post-war organisation that the main WWII allies had agreed at the Dumbarton Oaks conference in the United States in late 1944. Harry was attached to the Australian delegation to the conference led by Dr H.V. Evatt (then Attorney General and Minister for External Affairs in the Curtin/Chifley Governments) and participated in the processes by which the United Nations was established in October 1945. He became a member of the Australian delegation to the United Nations after its formation, until 1948. During this seminal period he worked on the establishment and development of the International Atomic Energy Commission, weapons disarmament in the UN Commission for Conventional Armaments, the establishment on behalf of Australia of the US-Australia Air Transportation Agreement under which Australia was granted the air routes which Qantas now enjoys to North America, the deliberations on the formation of the State of Israel and the UN Commission on Human Rights, chaired by Eleanor Roosevelt, the wife of the United States president, Franklin D Roosevelt. His proudest accomplishments were his substantial contribution, in the UN Commission, to the drafting and adoption of the Universal Declaration of Human Rights, and his role in persuading the United States to make available to Australia and a small group of other nations radio-isotopes for medical research and clinical application. All of this was accomplished while he was barely 30 years of age.

After spending a further period in the Australian Embassy in Washington DC, he returned to Canberra in 1949.

The following few years were ones of intense activity in Australian foreign affairs. Decolonisation and independence had arrived in India, Pakistan, Ceylon, Burma and Indonesia; the communist revolution occurred in China in 1949; war in Korea broke out in 1950; French control in Indochina was being disputed. Percy Spender as Australian Minister for External Affairs succeeding Richard (later Lord) Casey promoted the need for a strategic alliance between the United States and Australia and Harry was co-opted into Spender's negotiating team with instructions to prepare the first draft of the ANZUS treaty. After an intensive negotiation the treaty was signed in September 1951 and remains one of the core underpinnings of Australia's security and defence position.

Harry's first diplomatic mission was as Consul-General and United Nations Representative in Geneva from 1953 to 1956, followed by his appointment as Australian Commissioner in Singapore from 1956 to 1957.

On the basis of his intelligence work in the AIF and External Affairs, Harry was asked by the then Minister for External Affairs, Richard Casey in 1957 to investigate and report on the structure and operation of the recently formed Australian Security Intelligence Service (ASIS). He moved to Melbourne late in 1957 to commence work on the report, which recommended substantial changes in the financing, operating structure and accountability of the service. He agreed to replace the then Director, Alfred Brookes, and to remain as the Director of the Service during the reconstruction period. His term was completed in 1960. His connection with ASIS was only revealed with the publication in 1989 of the book “Oyster”, an exposé by Brian Toohey of the Australian security intelligence apparatus. Not even his family was aware of his activities and he kept no records of ASIS of any kind in his personal papers-unlike Casey, who maintained an extensive political diary of his intelligence involvement. From 1960 until his retirement in 1978 Harry continued to serve Australia with distinction in many senior posts.

He led Australia's delegations to many United Nations conferences including the ILO, WHO, UNCTAD, and ECAFE; he also led Australia's delegation to the Third United Nations Conference on the Law of the Sea which resulted in the adoption of a wholly revised Convention on the Law of the Sea. In that Conference he became the Chairman of the committee on dispute resolution and played a decisive role in the success of the treaty negotiation. He was also given responsibility within the Department of Foreign Affairs (as it had become by that time) for the management of Australia's Antarctic policy and treaty relationships and was Australia's principal negotiator of the Timor Gap treaty with Indonesia consequent on the resumption by the Indonesian Republic of the administration of East Timor. He was appointed as Australia's Ambassador to Belgium and the European Community from 1965 to 1968; to South Vietnam during the war years of 1968 to 1970; to the Federal Republic of Germany from 1971 to 1975; to the United Nations as Australia's permanent representative from 1975 to 1978.

After his retirement he was invited by Sir Garfield Barwick, whose acquaintance he made as Foreign Affairs Minister, to become the Director of the Australian Institute of International Affairs. He discharged that role until 1981. During his tenure at the Institute he also was a member of the Australia Day Committee.Ralph Harry interviewed by Kenneth Russell Henderson [sound recording].

== Honours ==
In 1960 Harry was appointed an Officer of the Order of the British Empire (OBE). In 1963 he was appointed as a Commander of the Order (CBE). In 1980 he was appointed a Companion of the Order of Australia (AC), "for public service, particularly as a diplomatic representative".

== Esperanto ==
Throughout his life, Harry maintained an interest in the constructed international language Esperanto, which he began to learn as a student in 1937. He was an active Esperanto speaker and a writer, conference attendee, lexicographer, translator, administrator, and promoter of international languages to reduce suspicion and intolerance between nations.

His most notable contribution to Esperanto and its cause was when he was serving as the Australian Ambassador to the United Nations in 1977. NASA, the US space agency, had programmed the launch in that year of two space probes, Voyager 1 and 2, which were designed to take and send back to Earth images of the outer planets, then continue beyond the Solar System after escaping the Sun's gravitational pull to become the first man-made objects to leave it. NASA and the cosmologist Carl Sagan decided to create identical golden records to attach to each probe that were designed to tell the story of the Solar System and mankind, in case one of the two probes ever comes into contact with extraterritorial intelligent life. Engraved on each record is, among other things, a soundtrack containing a compilation of 54 peace greetings to the universe recorded in different languages by various UN delegates. Harry succeeded in persuading the UN and NASA to accept a message in Esperanto. It is located third-last on track 3 of the golden records, and says:

Ni strebas vivi en paco kun la popoloj de la tuta mondo, de la tuta kosmo.
“We strive to live in peace with the peoples of the whole world, of the whole Cosmos.”

=== Translation ===
Before the 1972 Olympic Games in Munich, Germany, when he was serving as Australia's ambassador to West Germany, Harry translated into Esperanto several important UN documents, including the Charter and Universal Declaration of Human Rights. He edited a modest booklet with sport related terms in Esperanto and their translation into English, French and German. For decades he collected specific Australian expressions and published the first Australian English-Esperanto dictionary.Harry also wrote an English-Esperanto bridge (card game) dictionary, a review of Peter Benson's Comprehensive English-Esperanto Dictionary (CEED, 1995) and a collection of familiar quotations ("flugilhavaj vortoj", literally "words with wings") from languages around the world, with their Esperanto equivalents.

=== Literature ===
Harry was the main translator of the "Aŭstralia Antologio" ("Australian Anthology", 1988) which brought excerpts of Australian literature to the Esperanto-speaking world. Inspired by the well-known Esperanto-cabaretist Raymond Schwartz, he published humorous short stories and memories from his professional life in many Esperanto periodicals. They were collected in the reader "La Diplomato kiu Ridis" (1997) ("The Diplomat Who Laughed").

=== Activities within the Esperanto movement ===
Although Harry declined positions in the international Esperanto bureaucracy, he presided over the Australian Esperanto Association (AEA) in 1960–61 and then for several years after his retirement in 1977. He was member of AEA's examination commission and funded several of its projects. With Ivo Lapenna, former president of UEA, he worked together in the Internacia Esperanto-Asocio de Juristoj (IEAJ) and contributed to its organ Internacia Jura Revuo (IJR), mainly on topics of international public law. In 1967 he was honoured by the Universal Esperanto Association with a rare membership in the Honora Patrona Komitato.

== Publications ==
- 1990: (kun V. Gueltling) Auxstralia-Esperanta vortaro – Australian-esperanto dictionary. 3a eld. Bentley 1990. 54 p. – 21 cm. ilus.
- 1997: La diplomato, kiu ridis. The Esperano as a pdf, 77 p.
- 2000: (kun Brian Fox). Australian and New Zealand Esperanto Dictionary. Australian and New Zealand words not in other Esperanto Dictionaries. 4a plil. eld. Auxstralia kaj nov-zelanda Esperanto-asocioj, 2000. 98 p. – 21 cm (cx. 2.000 kapvortoj kaj esprimoj).

== Literature ==
- Harry, John (23 October 2002). "Short biography and picture of Ralph Harry written by his son". smh.com.au.
- Obituary by Trevor Steele in the UEA review "Esperanto" (Rotterdam), n-ro 1154.

Diplomatic posts
| Preceded by Alan Watt | Australian High Commissioner to Singapore; 1956–1957 | Succeeded by David McNicol |
| Preceded by Lew Border | Australian Ambassador to Vietnam; 1968–1970 | Succeeded by Arthur Morris |
| Preceded by Edward Ronald Walker | Australian Ambassador to the Federal Republic of Germany; 1971–1974 | Succeeded by Lew Border |
| Preceded by Laurence McIntyre | Permanent Representative of Australia to the United Nations; 1975–1978 | Succeeded by Harold David Anderson |
