= Malcolm Booker =

Australian public servant, diplomat, author and journalist

- Born: Malcolm Richard Booker; 9 August 1915
- Died: 15 July 1998 (aged 82)
- Occupations: Public servant, diplomat
- Spouse: Roxana

Malcolm Richard Booker (9 August 1915 – 15 July 1998) was an Australian public servant, diplomat, author and journalist.

He held diplomatic posts as an Ambassador in Thailand (1962–1963), Italy (1970–1974) and Yugoslavia (1974–1976). He was also Chargé d'Affaires in Myanmar from 1952 to 1953. After his diplomatic career he published several books and wrote regularly for The Canberra Times.

== Life and career ==
As a young man, Booker served as private secretary to Billy Hughes, the former prime minister. He later became one of Hughes' biographers, publishing The Great Professional: A Study of W.M. Hughes in 1980.

While on posting to Manila as first secretary from 1950 to 1952, Booker met Roxana. The pair became engaged, celebrating their betrothal at a party on the peak in Hong Kong.

From 1952 to 1953, Booker was Chargé d'Affaires in Burma, responsible for establishing the legation. He returned to Canberra in April 1953.

In 1962, Booker was appointed Australian Ambassador to Thailand. When he returned to Canberra in 1963, Booker was appointed Deputy Head of the Department of Territories. He soon returned to the external affairs department, taking a position as first assistant secretary, Level 3.

Booker was Australian Ambassador to Italy from 1970 to 1974. In March 1974 Booker was appointed the Australian Ambassador to Yugoslavia, with simultaneous appointments as the non-resident Ambassador to Romania and Bulgaria.

Booker's book The Last Domino was published in 1976. The book was critical of several previous Australian foreign affairs ministers and the 1975 Whitlam dismissal.

Booker died on 15 July 1998.

== Works ==
- The Last Domino: Aspects of Australia's Foreign Relations. Collins. 1976. ISBN 0002114496.
- Last Quarter: The Next Twenty-five Years in Asia and the Pacific. Melbourne University Press. 1978. ISBN 0522841511.
- The Great Professional: A Study of W.M. Hughes. McGraw-Hill Book Company. 1980. ISBN 0070729360.
- Conflict in the Balkans. Catalyst Press. 1994. ISBN 0646177869.

Diplomatic posts
New title Legation opened	Charge d’Affaires in Burma; 1952-1953	Succeeded by Colin Moodie as Minister
Preceded by Keith Waller	Australian Ambassador to Thailand; 1962–1963	Succeeded by John Ryan
Preceded by Walter Crocker	Australian Ambassador to Italy; 1972–1974	Succeeded by John Ryan
Preceded by Robert Robertson	Australian Ambassador to Yugoslavia; 1974–1976	Succeeded by Barrie Dexter
