= Ted Pocock =

Australian public servant and diplomat

Ted Pocock AM
- Born: Edward Robert Pocock; 14 March 1934
- Died: 5 April 2013 (aged 79)
- Education: University of Adelaide
- Occupations: Public servant, diplomat
- Spouse: Meg Grosvenor (m. 1971–2013)

Edward Robert "Ted" Pocock AM (14 March 1934 – 5 April 2013) was an Australian public servant and diplomat.

Pocock first joined the Department of External Affairs in 1959. He stayed only a short time, leaving for the United Kingdom to start his doctorate, but returned in 1961.

Pocock married Margaret Elizabeth Grosvenor on 30 January 1971 at a church in Sutton, New South Wales.

In 1980, Pocock was appointed to his first ambassadorial position as Australian Ambassador to the Republic of Korea. Between 1984 and 1987, Pocock was Australian Ambassador to the Soviet Union and Mongolia. In 1987, Pocock was appointed Ambassador to France.

Diplomatic posts
Preceded by Donald Jame Horne	Australian Ambassador to South Korea; 1980–1984	Succeeded by Geoff Miller
Preceded by David Evans	Australian Ambassador to the Soviet Union; 1984–1987	Succeeded by Robin Ashwin
Preceded by Peter Curtis	Australian Ambassador to France; 1987–1991	Succeeded by Clive Jones
Preceded by Geoffrey Price	Australian High Commissioner to Pakistan; 1991–1992	Succeeded by Philip Knight
Preceded by David Sadleir	Australian Ambassador to Belgium; 1992–1997	Succeeded by Donald Kenyon
