= List of ambassadors of Australia to Cambodia =

Ambassador of Australia to Cambodia
- ឯកអគ្គរដ្ឋទូតអូស្ត្រាលីប្រចាំនៅកម្ពុជា
- Coat of arms of Australia

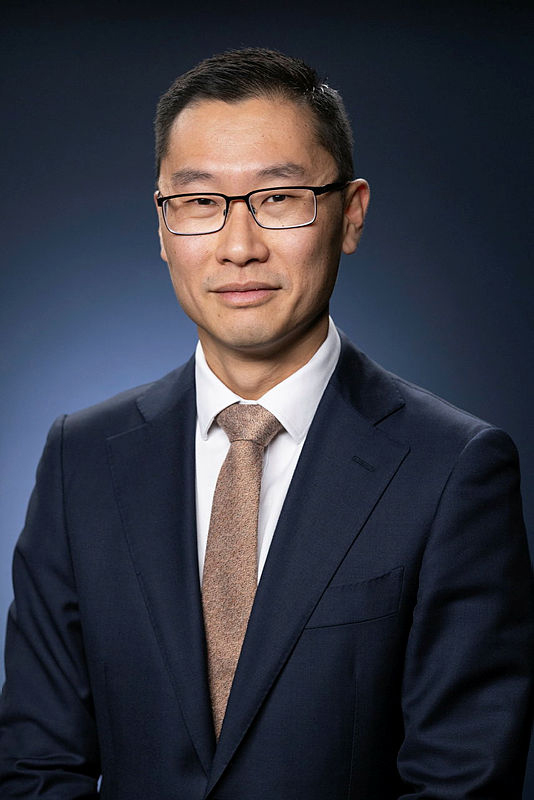
- Incumbent; Derek Yip since August 2024
- Department of Foreign Affairs and Trade
- Style: His Excellency
- Reports to: Minister for Foreign Affairs
- Residence: Phnom Penh
- Nominator: Prime Minister of Australia
- Appointer: Governor-General of Australia
- Inaugural holder: David McNicol (as Minister to Cambodia)
- Formation: 1957

The Ambassador of Australia to Cambodia is an officer of the Australian Department of Foreign Affairs and Trade and the head of the Embassy of the Commonwealth of Australia to the Kingdom of Cambodia. The current ambassador, since August 2024, is Derek Yip.

The Australian Legation in Phnom Penh was first raised to Embassy status in 1959, and came to an end in 1975 when the Lon Nol Government was overthrown. The Embassy remained closed during Khmer Rouge rule and subsequent war periods, and was reopened in 1992 after a treaty establishing the United Nations Transitional Authority in Cambodia was signed.

== List of heads of mission ==
Ordinal	Officeholder	Title	Term start date	Term end date	Time in office	Notes
1	David McNicol	Minister to Cambodia	1955	1956	0–1 years	
2	Frederick Blakeney	Minister to Cambodia	1957	1957	0 years	
3	Francis Hamilton Stuart	Ambassador of Australia to Cambodia	1957	1962	4–5 years	
4	Noël Deschamps	Ambassador of Australia to Cambodia	1962	1969	6–7 years	
5	Graham Feakes	Ambassador of Australia to Cambodia	1969	1972	2–3 years	
6	Marshall Johnston	Ambassador of Australia to Cambodia	1972	1974	1–2 years	
7	John Holloway	Ambassador of Australia to Cambodia	January 1992	25 July 1994	2 years, 6 months	
8	Tony Kevin	Ambassador of Australia to Cambodia	25 July 1994	1997	2–3 years	
9	Malcolm Leader	Ambassador of Australia to Cambodia	1997	2000	2–3 years	
10	Louise Hand	Ambassador of Australia to Cambodia	2000	2003	2–3 years	
11	Annabel Anderson	Ambassador of Australia to Cambodia	2003	2004	0–1 years	
12	Lisa Filipetto	Ambassador of Australia to Cambodia	2004	2007	2–3 years	
13	Margaret Adamson	Ambassador of Australia to Cambodia	2007	2010	2–3 years	
14	Penny Richards	Ambassador of Australia to Cambodia	2010	2013	2–3 years	
15	Burrows	Ambassador of Australia to Cambodia	April 2013	April 2016	3 years	
16	Angela Corcoran	Ambassador of Australia to Cambodia	April 2016	December 2019	3 years, 8 months	
17	Pablo Kang	Ambassador of Australia to Cambodia	January 2020	January 2023	3 years	
18	Justin Whyatt	Ambassador of Australia to Cambodia	January 2023	Jul 2024	1 year, 6 months	
19	Derek Yip	Ambassador of Australia to Cambodia	August 2024	Incumbent	2 years, 2 months	
