= Roy Fernandez =

Australian public servant and diplomat (1928–2014)

Roy Fernandez AO
- Born: Roy Robert Fernandez; 28 January 1928; Melbourne, Australia
- Died: 2 May 2014 (aged 86)
- Occupations: Public servant, diplomat
- Spouses: Nan Passmore (m. 1952; died 1988) Janette Parkinson (m. 2000)

Roy Robert Fernandez AO (28 January 1928 – 2 May 2014) was an Australian public servant and diplomat.

Fernandez was born on 12 January 1928 in Melbourne, Victoria.

In January 1970, Fernandez was appointed Ambassador to Yugoslavia. Then Minister for External Affairs William McMahon announced in March 1970 that Fernandez would also be accredited to Romania during his posting to Belgrade.

In 1971, Fernandez was appointed Minister in the Australian Embassy in Washington, D.C. Staff at the post numbered around 350.

In March 1980 Fernandez was appointed Ambassador to Belgium.

Fernandez took up an appointment as Ambassador to the Philippines in November 1982. In the Philippines, Fernandez was outspoken about the bad state of the country's economy.

Diplomatic posts
Preceded by Marshall Johnston	Australian Ambassador to Burma; 1968–1970	Succeeded by Richard Broinowski
Preceded by Alan Renouf	Australian Ambassador to Yugoslavia; 1970–1971	Succeeded by Robert Robertson
New title Position established	Australian Ambassador to Romania; 1970–1971	Succeeded by Robert Robertson
Preceded by James Plimsoll	Australian Ambassador to Belgium; 1981–1982	Succeeded by Harold David Anderson
Preceded by Richard Woolcott	Australian Ambassador to the Philippines; 1982–1986	Succeeded by John Holloway
