= John Hoyle (diplomat) =

Australian public servant and diplomat

- Born: 1927
- Died: 2012 (aged 84–85)
- Occupations: Public servant, diplomat

John H. A. Hoyle (1927–2012) was an Australian public servant and diplomat. Among other locations, he served in Jamaica, Bangladesh, New Zealand, Sweden and Germany.

In 1974 he was announced as the Australian Government's first resident High Commissioner to the Caribbean Commonwealth countries.

Diplomatic posts
Preceded by James Ingram	Australian High Commissioner to Jamaica; Australian High Commissioner to Barbados; Australian High Commissioner to Trinidad and Tobago; 1975–1977	Succeeded by Brian Hickey
Preceded by Tim McDonald	Australian High Commissioner to Bangladesh; 1978–1979	Succeeded by Mack Williams
Preceded by Frank Milne	Australian Ambassador to Yugoslavia; 1984–1988	Succeeded by Michael Wilson
