= List of high commissioners of Australia to Pakistan =

High Commissioner of Australia to Pakistan
- Incumbent; Tim Kane since September 2025
- Department of Foreign Affairs and Trade
- Style: His Excellency
- Reports to: Minister for Foreign Affairs
- Residence: Karachi (1948–1966); Rawalpindi (1966–1969); Islamabad (since 1969)
- Seat: Clifton, Karachi (1948–1961); Diplomatic Enclave, Islamabad (since 1969)
- Nominator: Prime Minister of Australia
- Appointer: Governor General of Australia
- Inaugural holder: John Oldham
- Formation: May 1949
- Website: Australian High Commission, Pakistan

The high commissioner of Australia to Pakistan is an officer of the Australian Department of Foreign Affairs and Trade and the head of the High Commission of the Commonwealth of Australia to the Islamic Republic of Pakistan in Islamabad. The high commissioner has the rank and status of an ambassador extraordinary and plenipotentiary and is currently Tim Kane since 2025. Non-resident accreditation was also previously held for Afghanistan. The High Commission was first established in Karachi in 1948, with John Oldham appointed as Australia's first high commissioner in 1949.

== Posting history ==
On 15 August 1947, the Minister for External Affairs, Herbert Evatt, announced the establishment of diplomatic relations between Australia and Pakistan, with a high commissioner appointed to Karachi. On 8 March 1948, John McMillan arrived in Pakistan as first secretary to establish the new high commission in Karachi. In May 1949, the first high commissioner, John Oldham, took up office.

When the Pakistani Government moved its capital from Karachi to Islamabad in 1966, the Australian High Commission also moved, initially to Rawalpindi from August 1966, and then Islamabad from 1969. When Australia, New Zealand, and the United Kingdom recognised the independence of East Pakistan as the new state of Bangladesh, the President of Pakistan, Zulfikar Ali Bhutto, announced on 30 January 1972 that Pakistan had withdrawn from the Commonwealth of Nations, and the high commissioner was retitled as an ambassador. When Pakistan rejoined the Commonwealth from 1 November 1989, the embassy again became a high commission.

=== Afghanistan ===
On 16 December 1968, the Minister for External Affairs, Paul Hasluck, announced the establishment of diplomatic relations between Australia and the Kingdom of Afghanistan, with the high commissioner to Pakistan receiving non-resident accreditation. The first Australian Ambassador to Afghanistan, Lew Border, formally presented his credentials to King Zahir Shah on 30 March 1969. With the beginning of the Soviet–Afghan War, diplomatic relations with Afghanistan were suspended from on 27 December 1979, with informal connections maintained by the High Commission in Islamabad. Australia and Afghanistan re-established diplomatic representation in 2002, after a long hiatus during conflict in Afghanistan. Between April 2002 and September 2006, Australia's high commissioner to Pakistan was accredited as non-resident Ambassador to Afghanistan, prior to the appointment of a resident ambassador in Kabul in 2006.

=== East Pakistan/Bangladesh ===
In April 1969, a Deputy High Commission (reporting to the High Commission in Islamabad) was opened in the city of Dacca, the capital of East Pakistan. Career diplomat James Lawrence (Jim) Allen, was appointed as Deputy High Commissioner. Australia was one of the first nations to officially recognise Bangladesh as an independent country on 31 January 1972, following the end of the Bangladesh Liberation War on 16 December 1971 and its status as East Pakistan. On 13 March 1972, the former Deputy High Commissioner in Dacca and Chargé d'affaires of the Australian mission since the establishment of diplomatic relations, Jim Allen, was appointed as Australia's first Ambassador to Bangladesh, which was quickly upgraded to the rank of high commissioner following Bangladesh's admission to the Commonwealth of Nations on 18 April 1972.

== Heads of mission ==
#	Officeholder	Title	Other offices	Residency	Term start date	Term end date	Time in office	Notes
1	John Egerton Oldham	High Commissioner	N/A	Karachi	May 1949	March 1952	2 years, 10 months	
2	Leslie Beavis	High Commissioner	N/A	Karachi	March 1952	July 1954	2 years, 4 months	
3	Walter Cawthorn	High Commissioner	N/A	Karachi	24 July 1954	14 December 1958	4 years, 142 days	
−	Robert Furlonger (Acting )	High Commissioner	N/A	Karachi	14 December 1958	28 January 1959	45 days	
4	Roden Cutler VC	High Commissioner	N/A	Karachi	28 January 1959	17 June 1961	2 years, 140 days	
−	W. Kevin Flanagan (Acting )	High Commissioner	N/A	Karachi	17 June 1961	26 September 1961	101 days	
5	Charles Kevin	High Commissioner	N/A	Karachi	26 September 1961	12 April 1962	198 days	
−	H. Marshall (Acting )	High Commissioner	N/A	Karachi	12 April 1962	16 October 1962	187 days	
6	David McNicol (Acting )	High Commissioner	N/A	Karachi	16 October 1962	24 November 1965	3 years, 39 days	
−	Barry Hall (Acting )	High Commissioner	N/A	Karachi	24 November 1965	March 1966	3 months	
7	Bill Cutts	High Commissioner	N/A	Karachi	March 1966	August 1966	2 years, 4 months	
7	Bill Cutts	High Commissioner	N/A	Rawalpindi	August 1966	11 July 1968	2 years, 4 months	
−	Duncan Campbell (Acting )	High Commissioner	N/A	Rawalpindi	11 July 1968	August 1968	0 months	
8	Lew Border	High Commissioner	^{A}	Rawalpindi	August 1968	April 1969	1 year, 9 months	
8	Lew Border	High Commissioner	^{A}	Islamabad	April 1969	24 May 1970	1 year, 9 months	
−	John Starey (Acting )	High Commissioner	^{A}	Islamabad	24 May 1970	August 1970	2 months	
9	Francis Hamilton Stuart	High Commissioner	^{A}	Islamabad	August 1970	30 January 1972	2 years, 9 months	
9	Francis Hamilton Stuart	Ambassador	^{A}	Islamabad	30 January 1972	May 1973	2 years, 9 months	
10	Arthur Morris	Ambassador	^{A}	Islamabad	May 1973	August 1975	2 years, 3 months	
11	John Petherbridge	Ambassador	^{A}	Islamabad	August 1975	August 1980	5 years	
12	Walter Handmer	Ambassador	N/A	Islamabad	August 1980	May 1984	3 years, 9 months	
13	Ivor Gordon Bowden	Ambassador	N/A	Islamabad	May 1984	June 1987	3 years, 1 month	
14	Geoffrey Price	Ambassador	N/A	Islamabad	June 1987	1 November 1989	4 years, 4 months	
14	Geoffrey Price	High Commissioner	N/A	Islamabad	1 November 1989	October 1991	4 years, 4 months	
15	Ted Pocock	High Commissioner	N/A	Islamabad	October 1991	August 1992	10 months	
16	Philip Knight	High Commissioner	N/A	Islamabad	August 1992	June 1996	3 years, 10 months	
17	Geoffrey Allen	High Commissioner	N/A	Islamabad	June 1996	June 2000	4 years	
18	Howard Brown	High Commissioner	^{A}	Islamabad	June 2000	August 2004	4 years, 2 months	
19	Zorica McCarthy	High Commissioner	^{A}	Islamabad	August 2004	June 2009	4 years, 10 months	
20	Tim George	High Commissioner	N/A	Islamabad	June 2009	June 2012	3 years	
21	Peter Heyward	High Commissioner	N/A	Islamabad	June 2012	June 2015	3 years	
22	Margaret Adamson	High Commissioner	N/A	Islamabad	July 2015	June 2019	3 years, 11 months	
23	Geoffrey Shaw	High Commissioner	N/A	Islamabad	July 2019	December 2021	2 years, 5 months	
24	Neil Hawkins	High Commissioner	N/A	Islamabad	July 2022	September 2025	3 years, 2 months	
25	Tim Kane	High Commissioner	N/A	Islamabad	September 2025	Incumbent	1 year, 1 month	

=== Notes ===
^A: Also non-resident Ambassador to Afghanistan, 1968–1979 and 2002–2006.

== See also ==
- Australia–Pakistan relations
