= Bronte Moules =

Australian diplomat

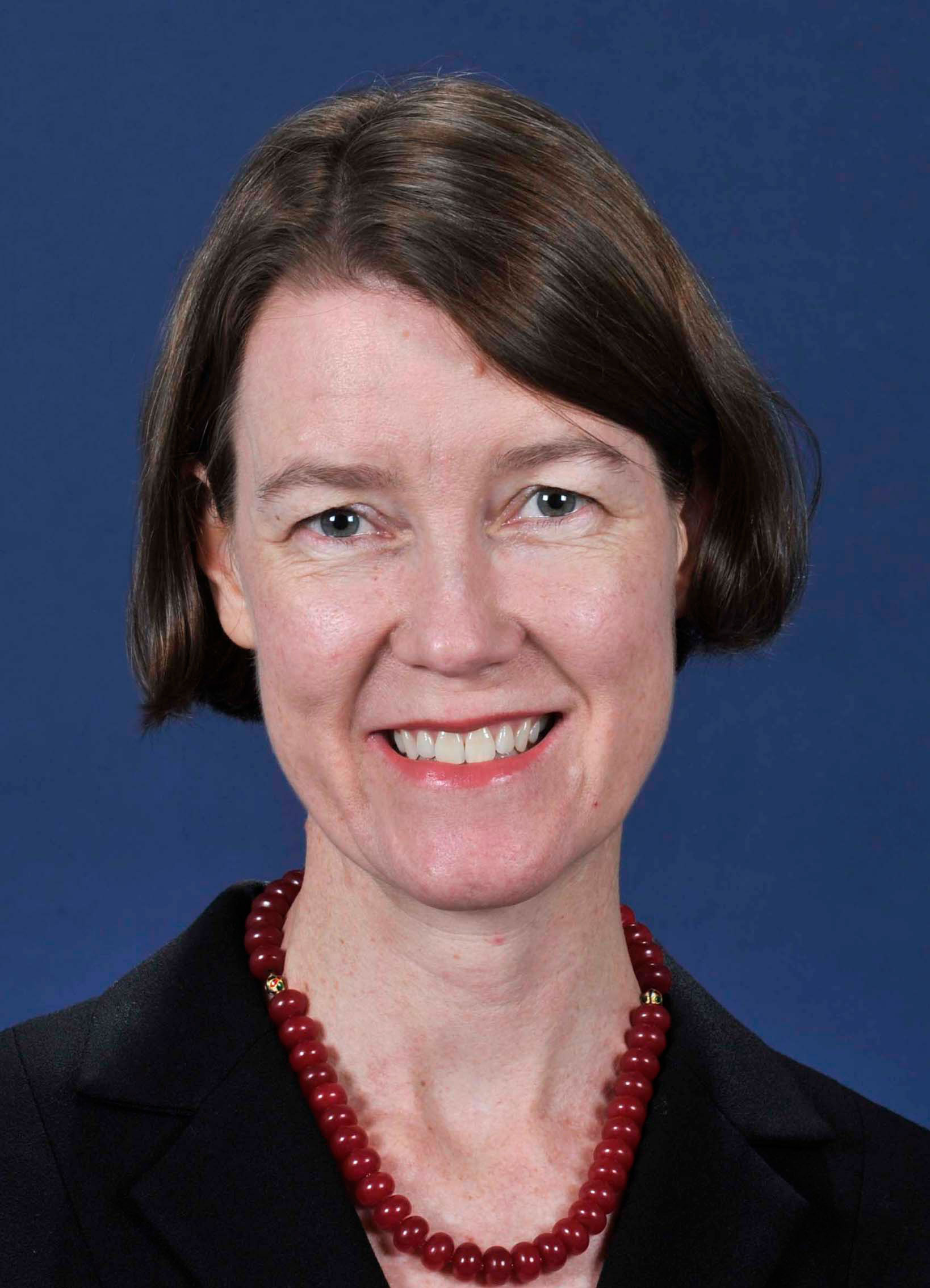
- Moules, c. 2013
- Education: Australian National University (BA)
- Occupation: Diplomat

Bronte Moules is an Australian diplomat. She was Ambassador to Zimbabwe, having previously served as Deputy High Commissioner to Papua New Guinea. Moules also had responsibility for Malawi, the Democratic Republic of the Congo, the Republic of the Congo, and Zambia. She became Ambassador to Myanmar effective January 2011.

== Career ==
Moules earned a Bachelor of Arts degree in 1990 from the Australian National University and a Graduate Diploma in Foreign Affairs and Trade.

=== AWB oil-for-wheat scandal ===
Moules played a critical role in uncovering the Australian Wheat Board's (AWB) Iraqi kickbacks scandal. In the early 2000s, Moules was senior member of Australia's delegation to the United Nations. During that time, the “AWB was accused of paying kickbacks disguised as trucking fees to the regime of Saddam Hussein in return for wheat contracts.” Moules had been asked to investigate complaints made by Canada about kickbacks.

=== Human rights ===
In December 2022, Moules was named as Australia's inaugural Ambassador for Human Rights.
