= List of ambassadors of Australia to Serbia =

Ambassador of Australia to Serbia

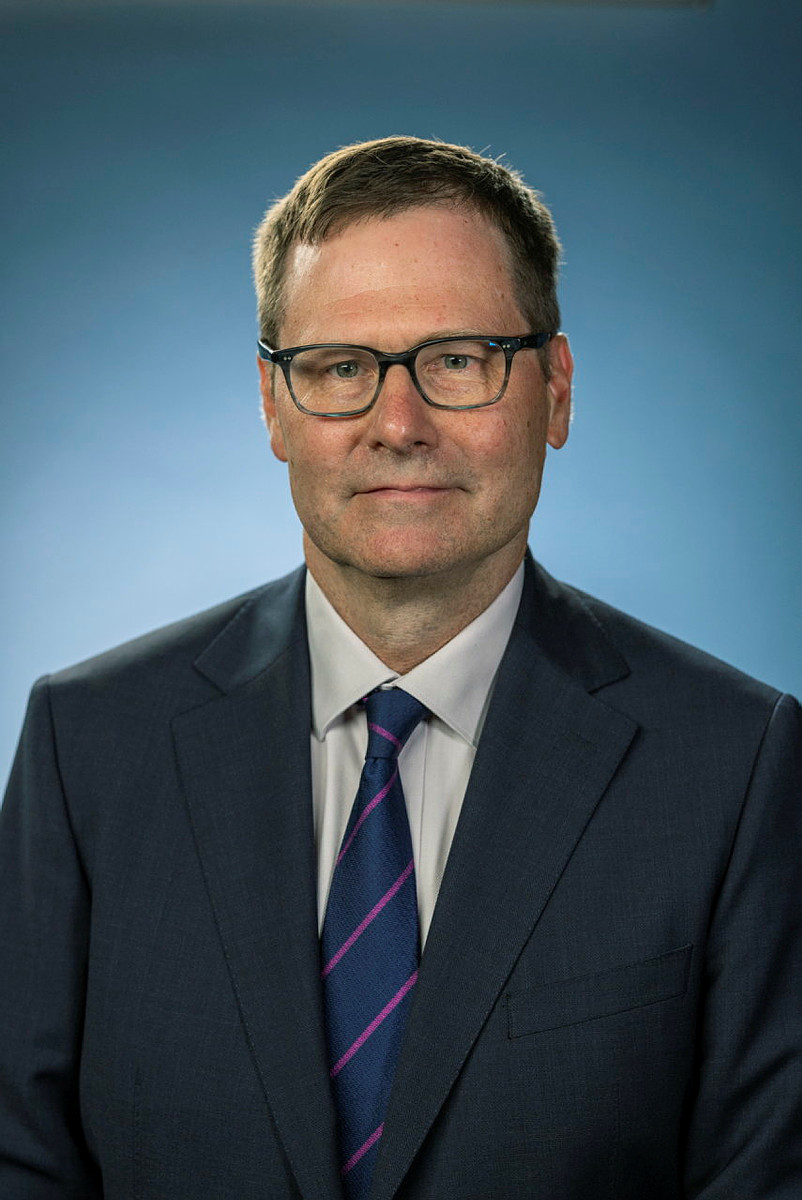
- Incumbent; Peter Truswell since 17 January 2025
- Department of Foreign Affairs and Trade
- Style: His Excellency
- Reports to: Minister for Foreign Affairs
- Nominator: Prime Minister of Australia
- Appointer: Governor General of Australia
- Inaugural holder: Alan Renouf
- Formation: 1967 (Yugoslavia); 2003 (Serbia and Montenegro); 2006 (Serbia)
- Website: Australian Embassy in Belgrade

The Ambassador of Australia to Serbia is an officer of the Australian Department of Foreign Affairs and Trade and the head of the Embassy of the Commonwealth of Australia to the Republic of Serbia in Belgrade. The position has the rank and status of an ambassador extraordinary and plenipotentiary. The current ambassador, since 17 January 2025, is Peter Truswell. The Ambassador also holds non-resident accreditation for the Republic of North Macedonia and for Montenegro.

== History ==
Serbia and Australia have enjoyed official diplomatic relations since 26 April 1966, when Australia and the Socialist Federal Republic of Yugoslavia agreed to enter into formal diplomatic relations, with Australia opening an embassy in Belgrade in 1967. However, with the breakup of Yugoslavia in the early 1990s, Prime Minister Bob Hawke acted quickly to recognise the newly independent former Yugoslav Republics of Slovenia and Croatia in early 1992. Then subsequently the former republics of Bosnia and Herzegovina in May 1992 and Macedonia on 15 February 1994 were recognised. With these acts Australia maintained its relations with Yugoslavia, with Foreign Minister Gareth Evans stating: "We do continue to recognise what is left of Yugoslavia as Yugoslavia. Our mission in Belgrade will stay accordingly accredited to Yugoslavia and they'll be no change in the status of the Yugoslav mission here in Australia."

However, with the developing civil war in Yugoslavia and its former republics, Australia imposed sanctions on Federal Republic of Yugoslavia and the Ambassador to the Federal Republic of Yugoslavia (comprising Serbia and Montenegro) was recalled with a new ambassador not being appointed until 1997. The new ambassador, Noel Campbell, had served as Chargé d'affaires in Belgrade since May 1994, while he had been accredited as Ambassador to Romania since April 1992 and to the Republic of Macedonia since December 1995. From 1970 until 15 January 2014 the Ambassador in Belgrade was also accredited to Romania, when it was transferred to the Embassy in Athens. From 1972 to 1992 accreditation was also held for Bulgaria, until it was also transferred to the Embassy in Greece. From 1985, the Ambassador was also accredited to Albania, following the establishment of diplomatic relations on 15 September 1984, to 1992 when it was transferred to the Embassy in Rome. the Federal Republic of Yugoslavia became the State Union of Serbia and Montenegro in February 2003 and with the independence of Montenegro in early 2006, the union dissolved and Australia recognised Montenegro on 27 June 2006 and transferred recognition of the former Union to the reconstituted Republic of Serbia, with non-resident accreditation to Montenegro from 1 September 2006.

== List of representatives ==
Ordinal	Officeholder	Title	Other offices	Term start date	Term end date	Time in office	Notes
Socialist Federal Republic of Yugoslavia
1	Alan Renouf OBE	Ambassador		1967	1970	2–3 years	
2	Roy Fernandez	Ambassador		1970	1971	0–1 years	
3	Robert Robertson	Ambassador	^{C}	July 1971	1973	1–2 years	
4	Malcolm Booker	Ambassador	^{C}	1974	November 1976	1–2 years	
5	Barrie Dexter	Ambassador	^{C}	November 1976	1980	3–4 years	
6	Michael Wilson	Ambassador	^{C}	1980	1984	3–4 years	
7	John Hoyle	Ambassador	^{C}^{D}	1984	December 1988	3–4 years	
8	Frank Milne	Ambassador	^{C}^{D}	December 1988	May 1992	3 years, 5 months	
Federal Republic of Yugoslavia
(n/a)	Edward Patching	Chargé d'affaires		May 1992	May 1994	2 years	
(n/a)	Noel Campbell	Chargé d'affaires		May 1994	28 April 1997	2 years, 11 months	
8	Noel Campbell	Ambassador	^{A}	28 April 1997	August 1997	3 months	
9	Chris Lamb	Ambassador	^{A}	August 1997	15 February 2000	2 years, 6 months	
10	Charles Stuart	Ambassador	^{A}	March 2000	4 February 2003	3 years, 1 month	
10	Charles Stuart	Ambassador	^{A}	4 February 2003	April 2003	3 years, 1 month	
State Union of Serbia and Montenegro
11	John Oliver	Ambassador	^{A}	April 2003	5 June 2006	4 years, 1 month	
11	John Oliver	Ambassador	^{A}^{B}	5 June 2006	May 2007	4 years, 1 month	
Republic of Serbia
12	Clare Birgin	Ambassador	^{A}^{B}	May 2007	June 2010	3 years, 1 month	
13	Helena Studdert	Ambassador	^{A}^{B}	June 2010	December 2013	3 years, 6 months	
14	Julia Feeney	Ambassador	^{A}^{B}	December 2013	July 2018	4 years, 7 months	
15	Ruth Stewart	Ambassador	^{A}^{B}	July 2018	2021	2–3 years	
16	Daniel Emery	Ambassador	^{A}^{B}	4 October 2021	January 2025	3–4 years	
17	Peter Truswell	Ambassador	^{A}^{B}	17 January 2025	incumbent	1 year, 233 days	

== Notes ==
^A Also served as non-resident Ambassador of Australia to the Republic of North Macedonia, since 15 February 1994.
^B Also served as non-resident Ambassador of Australia to Montenegro, since 1 September 2006.
^C Also served as non-resident Ambassador of Australia to Romania, from 1972 to April 1992.
^D Also served as non-resident Ambassador of Australia to Albania, 15 September 1984 to 1992.

== See also ==
- Australia–Serbia relations
- Foreign relations of Australia
