= David McNicol (diplomat) =

Australian public servant and diplomat

David McNicol CBE
- Born: David Williamson McNicol; 20 June 1913; Adelaide, South Australia, Australia
- Died: 18 September 2001 (aged 88); Canberra, ACT, Australia
- Education: Carey Baptist Grammar School; King's College
- Alma mater: University of Adelaide (BA)
- Occupations: Public servant, diplomat

David Williamson McNicol CBE (20 June 1913 – 18 September 2001) was an Australian public servant and diplomat.

== Early life and career ==
McNicol was born on 20 June 1913 in Adelaide. He was educated at Carey Baptist Grammar School and King's College. He graduated from the University of Adelaide with a Bachelor of Arts degree in the 1930s.

During World War II, McNicol served in the Royal Australian Air Force (RAAF) as a pilot.

== Diplomatic career ==
McNicol joined the Commonwealth Public Service in the Department of External Affairs in 1946.

McNicol was a member of an Australian delegation responsible for negotiating the Manila Treaty in September 1954. In December 1954, McNicol's appointment as Minister to Vietnam, Laos and Cambodia was announced. In January 1955 the Australian Government announced McNicol's residence for the post would be at the new Australian Legation in Cambodia, to be opened in February that year.

From 1957 to 1960, McNicol was High Commissioner to Singapore, at the time Lee Kuan Yew was moving the country towards independence.

He was High Commissioner to Pakistan from 1962 to 1965 His Pakistan appointment was announced by then Minister for External Affairs Garfield Barwick in July 1962.

In June 1968, then Minister for External Affairs Paul Hasluck announced McNicol's appointment as Ambassador to Thailand. At the same time, he was also appointed Australia's council representative to Southeast Asia Treaty Organisation (SEATO).

In December 1972, then Prime Minister Gough Whitlam appointed McNicol Deputy High Commissioner in London.

== Awards ==
In the 1966 New Year Honours, McNicol was appointed a Commander of the Order of the British Empire (CBE) whilst High Commissioner in Wellington, New Zealand.

== Retirement and later life ==
McNicol retired on 20 June 1978.

He died on 18 September 2001 in Canberra.

Diplomatic posts
Preceded by John Quinn	Australian Minister to Cambodia; Australian Minister to Vietnam; Australian Minister to Laos; 1955–1957	Succeeded by Frederick Blakeney
Preceded by Ralph Harry	Australian High Commissioner to Singapore; 1957–1960	Succeeded by Gordon Jockel
Preceded by Charles Kevin	Australian High Commissioner to Pakistan; 1962–1965	Succeeded by Bill Cutts
Preceded by Donald Alastair Cameron	Australian High Commissioner to New Zealand; 1965–1968	Succeeded by Ted Hicks
Preceded by Allan Loomes	Australian Ambassador to Thailand; 1968–1969	Succeeded by Tom Critchley
Preceded by Kenneth Bailey	Australian High Commissioner to Canada; 1969–1973	Succeeded by James Ingram
Preceded by Colin Moodie	Australian High Commissioner to South Africa; 1975–1977	Succeeded by K.R. Douglas-Scott
