= Winfred Peppinck =

Australian author and former diplomat

Winfred Marcel Peppinck

Australian High Commissioner to Barbados
- In office 2001 – May 2004
- Prime Minister: John Howard
- Succeeded by: John Michell (to Port of Spain)

Personal details
- Born: 2 January 1946 The Hague, Netherlands
- Died: 1 October 2020 (aged 74) Canberra, Australian Capital Territory
- Website: Australia in Trinidad and Tobago

Winfred Marcel Peppinck (2 January 1946 – 1 October 2020) was an Australian author and former diplomat who served as the Australian Ambassador to the Caribbean at the former High Commission in Bridgetown, Barbados.

== Biography ==
He was born in The Hague, in the Netherlands on 2 January 1946. His family Annette (mum) Waldemar (dad) and Wido (younger brother) moved to the Dutch East Indies and in 1951 they emigrated to Perth, Western Australia. He received a degree in politics then worked for the Australian Department of Foreign Affairs as a diplomatic trainee. He was assigned to Brazil, South Africa, Uganda and Indonesia. From 2001 to 2004 he was the Ambassador to the Caribbean.

From 2004 he served as an advisor to Bahrain prime minister Shaikh Khalifa ibn Salman Al Khalifa. After the start of the 2011 Bahraini uprising, Peppinck wrote a number of articles in the pro-government Gulf Daily News, defending the Bahrain government's military crackdown on pro-democracy protesters.

Peppinck died on 1 October 2020.

Diplomatic posts
Preceded by Paul Smith	Australian High Commissioner to Barbados; 2001 – 2004	Succeeded by John Michell
