= Australia–United Arab Emirates relations =

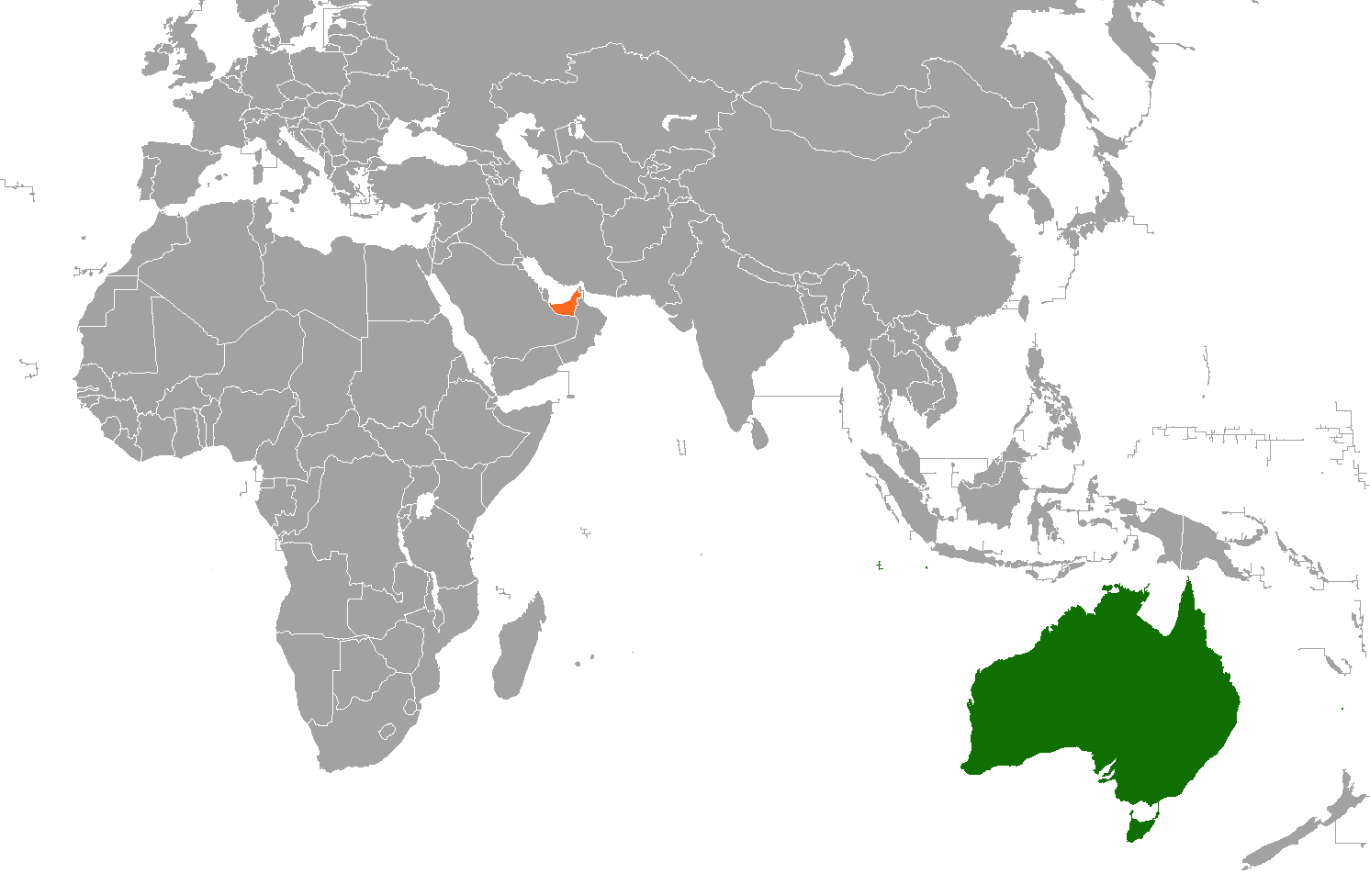

- Australia: United Arab Emirates

Bilateral ties exist between Australia and the United Arab Emirates. The UAE maintains an embassy in Canberra whilst Australia has an embassy in Abu Dhabi and a consulate-general in Dubai.

== High level visits ==
In February 2010, UAE foreign minister Sheikh Abdullah bin Zayed Al-Nahyan made a historic first official visit to Australia. During the tour, a memorandum of understanding on the establishment of a Joint Committee on Consular Affairs was signed by Nahyan and Australian foreign minister Stephen Smith.

== Transport links ==
Etihad Airways offers direct services from Abu Dhabi to Sydney, Brisbane, Perth, and Melbourne. Emirates offers direct services from Dubai to Perth, Adelaide, Sydney, Brisbane, and Melbourne.

== Military relations ==
Australia openly supports the United Arab Emirates during the Yemeni Civil War, shipping weapons and ammunition to provide for the Yemeni government's forces and the Saudi-led coalition, which led to criticism among the public about Australia's involvement, given the high civilian casualties. An Australian retired general, Mike Hindmarsh, is also hired to command the Emirati troops during the war.

== Trade ==
Monthly value of Australian merchandise exports to the United Arab Emirates (A$ millions) since 1988

Monthly value of UAE merchandise exports to Australia (A$ millions) since 1988

The UAE is identified by Australia as its largest market in the Persian Gulf region. As of 2008–09, trade between the UAE and Australia was valued at A$5.5 billion. Of this, Australian exports to the UAE were A$3.6 billion, while UAE exports to Australia were A$1.9 billion (including crude petroleum imports worth A$1.7 billion).

On 17 September 2024, Australia announced that it had reached a deal with the UAE to remove tariffs for approximately 99% of Australian exports in a bid to improve trade ties.

== Education ==
The majority of Emiratis residing in Australia are students pursuing education in various Australian universities. Australia is a popular destination to which Emirati students have turned for higher education, with enrolments increasing over the years. As of 2013, there were up to 1,700 Emirati students in Australia. In that same year, there were over 900 Emirati student enrolments for Australia. Many of them are on UAE government scholarships and pursuing postgraduate or PhD degrees. They are concentrated in large cities such as Sydney, Melbourne, Brisbane, and Perth. In addition, around 14,000 Emiratis also visit Australia each year for tourism. Migration is made easier by relaxed visa requirements and the extensive aviation links between both countries.

== See also ==
- Australians in the United Arab Emirates
