= Arthur Windsor =

- Born: Arthur Lloyd Windsor c. 1832; Atlantic Ocean
- Died: 20 January 1913 (aged 80); Melbourne, Victoria, Australia
- Occupation: Journalist
- Known for: Editor of The Argus and The Age

Arthur Lloyd Windsor (c. 1832 – 20 January 1913) was an Australian journalist noted for his work on The Argus and The Age.

== Biography ==
Windsor was the son of Henry George Windsor and his wife, Clara Windsor. He was baptised in November 1832 in Saint Michael, Barbados. His father was a slaveholder; he received £318 in compensation for 14 slaves he owned in Barbados, after the Slavery Abolition Act 1833 was passed.
