= Zorica McCarthy =

Australian diplomat

Zorica McCarthy was the Australian High Commissioner to Pakistan (2004–2006) who was investigated for "buying discounted shares in the failed fuel technology company Firepower (and) has been found guilty of breaching the rules but forgiven because the breach was unintentional". McCarthy was accredited as a non-resident Ambassador to Afghanistan. McCarthy was also Ambassador to Spain from January 2010 to January 2013.

== Firebrand investigation ==
McCarthy bought shares in Firebrand 14 days after Firebrand and a Pakistani company signed an agreement at a ceremony she organised and was witnessed by Australia's former prime minister John Howard and Pakistan's former prime minister Shaukat Aziz.

== Personal life ==
McCarthy has two daughters with ex-husband John McCarthy.
