= List of ambassadors of Australia to Colombia =

Ambassador of Australia to Colombia

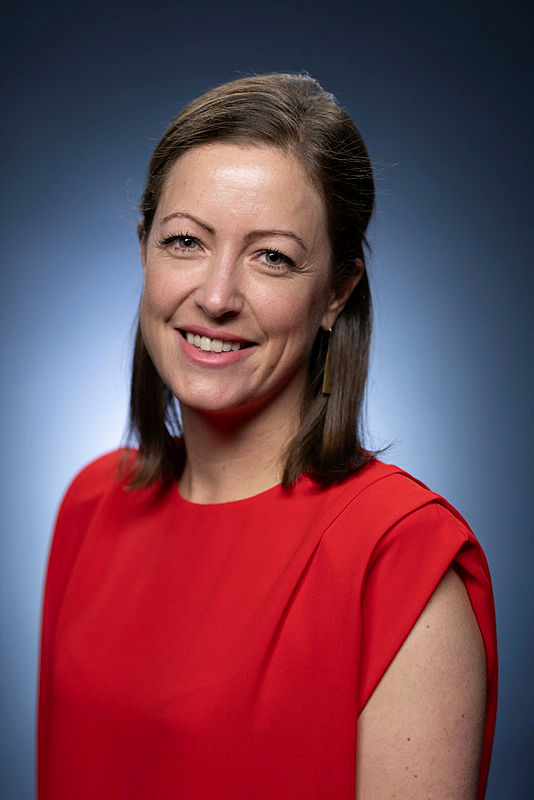
- Incumbent; Anna Chrisp since 29 September 2023
- Department of Foreign Affairs and Trade
- Style: Her Excellency
- Reports to: Minister for Foreign Affairs
- Nominator: Prime Minister of Australia
- Appointer: Governor General of Australia
- Inaugural holder: Allan Loomes (resident in Peru)
- Formation: 1976
- Website: Australian Embassy Bogotá, Colombia

The ambassador of Australia to Colombia is an officer of the Australian Department of Foreign Affairs and Trade and the head of the Embassy of the Commonwealth of Australia to the Republic of Colombia. The position has the rank and status of an ambassador extraordinary and plenipotentiary and is based in the Australian Embassy in Bogotá, which was opened by Foreign Minister Julie Bishop on 27 June 2017. The embassy replaced and consolidated an Austrade office and Consulate-General, as well as a separate Australian Federal Police Liaison Office, in Bogotá. The present Chargé d'Affaires is currently Bernard Unkles since 23 November 2022.

== Posting history ==
Australia and Colombia established diplomatic relations on 9 September 1975 and the Ambassador to Peru, Allan Loomes, received non-resident accreditation for Colombia, presenting his credentials to President Alfonso López Michelsen in 1976. In 1983 accreditation for Colombia was transferred to the Australian Embassy in Caracas, Venezuela. When the Caracas embassy was closed in 2002, accreditation was then transferred to the resident ambassador in Santiago, Chile. In 1989, an Honorary Consulate was opened in Bogotá. Prominent Colombian lawyer, Dario Cárdenas, of one of Colombia's largest law firms, Dentons Cardenas & Cardenas, served as Honorary Consul from July 1989 to 1994.

On 30 August 2011, Trade Minister and Acting Minister for Foreign Affairs Craig Emerson announced the opening of a new Austrade office and Australian Consulate-General (managed by Austrade) in Bogotá: "This decision follows improvements in business conditions and increasing levels of foreign direct investment in response to the Colombian Government’s economic reform agenda". From July 2012 until the opening of the resident embassy in June 2017, the Trade Commissioner served concurrently as Consul-General.

In late 2016, Trade Minister Steven Ciobo visited Colombia and later announced to Colombian press with Foreign Minister Julie Bishop that Australia intended to open an Australian resident Embassy in Colombia as part of a greater Australian effort "to get closer to Latin America". On 10 March 2017, Bishop made the formal announcement of the intention to open a resident Embassy in Bogotá, noting: "Colombia is the fourth largest economy in Latin America and enjoys the highest growth rate of the major economies in the region. Australia’s total trade with Colombia is worth $500 million annually and our investment in Colombia is valued at more than $3 billion." This was part of a planned $58 million expansion over four years of Australia's diplomatic presence abroad, being the fifth Australian embassy in Latin America and established alongside a new embassy to Morocco and a consulate-general in Surabaya. It was also reported that the increasing stability within Colombia due to the end of the civil war and its status as "South America's second strongest economy [with] an incredible demand for Australian goods and services" had prompted the embassy's creation. In response to the announcement, the Colombian press reported the Foreign Minister, María Ángela Holguín, as noting the importance of the embassy's opening to assisting the growing international student and education ties between the two countries.

On 27 June 2017, Foreign Minister Bishop officially opened the new Australian Embassy in Bogotá and announced the appointment of the first resident ambassador the following day.

== List of officeholders ==
=== Heads of mission ===
Ordinal	Name	Office	Residency	Term start date	Term end date	Time in office	Notes
1	Allan Loomes OBE	Ambassador of Australia to Colombia	Lima, Peru	1976	1978	1–2 years	
2	Alan Fogg MBE	Ambassador of Australia to Colombia	Lima, Peru	1979	1980	0–1 years	
3	Jim Ferguson	Ambassador of Australia to Colombia	Lima, Peru	1981	1983	1–2 years	
4	Peter Barbour	Ambassador of Australia to Colombia	Caracas, Venezuela	1983	1984	0–1 years	
5	Richard Starr	Ambassador of Australia to Colombia	Caracas, Venezuela	1985	1986	0–1 years	
6	Anthony Dingle	Ambassador of Australia to Colombia	Caracas, Venezuela	1987	1991	3–4 years	
7	Dominique De Stoop	Ambassador of Australia to Colombia	Caracas, Venezuela	1991	1996	4–5 years	
8	Roger Frankel	Ambassador of Australia to Colombia	Caracas, Venezuela	1996	2000	3–4 years	
9	Susan Tanner	Ambassador of Australia to Colombia	Caracas, Venezuela	2000	2002	1–2 years	
10	Elizabeth Schick	Ambassador of Australia to Colombia	Santiago, Chile	2002	20 September 2005	2–3 years	
11	Crispin Conroy	Ambassador of Australia to Colombia	Santiago, Chile	20 September 2005	24 February 2009	3 years, 157 days	
12	Virginia Greville	Ambassador of Australia to Colombia	Santiago, Chile	24 February 2009	29 May 2012	3 years, 95 days	
13	Tim Kane	Ambassador of Australia to Colombia	Santiago, Chile	29 May 2012	28 June 2017	5 years, 30 days	
14	Sophie Davies	Ambassador of Australia to Colombia	Bogotá, Colombia	28 June 2017	22 October 2020	3 years, 116 days	
15	Erika Thompson	Ambassador of Australia to Colombia	Bogotá, Colombia	22 October 2020	incumbent	6 years, 31 days	

=== Consul-General and Trade Commissioner ===
Ordinal	Name	Office	Residency	Term start date	Term end date	Time in office	Notes
1	Crispin Conroy	Consul-General and Trade Commissioner	Bogotá, Colombia	June 2012	June 2016	4 years	
2	Saïd Metwalli	Consul-General and Trade Commissioner	Bogotá, Colombia	August 2016	28 June 2017	10 months	
Consul-General and Trade Commission office closed; embassy established in Bogotá.

== See also ==
- Foreign relations of Australia
- Foreign relations of Colombia
