= List of high commissioners of Australia to Fiji =

High Commissioner of Australia to Fiji

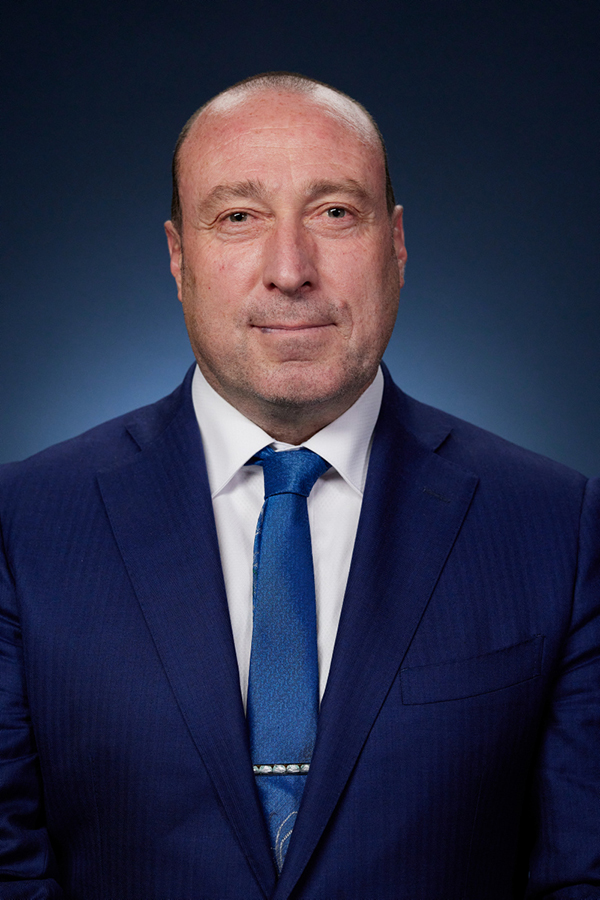
- Incumbent; Peter Roberts since 16 February 2025
- Department of Foreign Affairs and Trade
- Style: His Excellency
- Reports to: Minister for Foreign Affairs
- Residence: Tamavua, Suva
- Nominator: Prime Minister of Australia
- Appointer: Governor General of Australia
- Inaugural holder: R. N. Hamilton (Commissioner)
- Formation: 4 March 1964
- Website: Australian High Commission, Fiji

The high commissioner of Australia to Fiji is an officer of the Australian Department of Foreign Affairs and Trade and the head of the High Commission of the Commonwealth of Australia in Fiji. The position has the rank and status of an ambassador extraordinary and plenipotentiary and is currently vacant, with the head of mission being John Williams as acting high commissioner and chargé d’affaires since 1 September 2022. The high commissioner is also Australia's Permanent Representative to the Pacific Islands Forum Secretariat, which is headquartered in Suva.

== Posting history ==
On 29 November 1963, the Minister for External Affairs, Sir Garfield Barwick, announced the establishment of an Australian Commission in Suva to represent Australian interests in the Colony of Fiji, with R. N. Hamilton taking up the office of commissioner. With the independence of Fiji on 10 October 1970, the Australian Commission was upgraded to a high commission. On 29 November 1970, Birch was appointed as Australia's first non-resident accredited high commissioner to Tonga, visiting Tonga on 3 December 1970 to present his letters of commission to the King of Tonga. On 13 December 1970, Birch was appointed as the non-resident accredited high commissioner to Western Samoa. The high commissioner would have responsibility for relations with Tonga and Western Samoa until resident high commissions were established in Nukuʻalofa in 1980, and Apia in October 1979.

Prior to the independence of Tuvalu on 1 October 1978, the High Commission was accredited to the country, with the high commissioner (1977–2014) and deputy high commissioner (2014–2018) also serving as the non-resident accredited high commissioner to Tuvalu. A resident high commissioner to Tuvalu was appointed in 2018, and the High Commission was officially opened in 2019.

Following the coups of 1987 by the military and Sitiveni Rabuka, the declaration of Fiji as a republic on 10 October 1987, and the resignation of Sir Penaia Ganilau as Governor-General of Fiji on 15 October 1987, foreign minister Bill Hayden announced that the Australian high commissioner to Fiji, John Piper, would be recalled for "consultations". With Fiji's membership in the Commonwealth of Nations considered to have lapsed, when the next Australian representative to Fiji was appointed in 1988, it was as "Ambassador" rather than high commissioner. When a new constitution was promulgated in July 1997, Fiji was readmitted to the Commonwealth from 1 October 1997 and the office once again was titled "High Commissioner". In 1991 the Australian Government acquired a 3.7 hectare site in Suva for the construction of a new embassy chancery, ambassador's residence, and facilities/residences for staff. The works were commissioned in 1992–1993, with the chancery designed by Australian Construction Services, and the original circa 1900 Ambassador's residence refurbished to a design by Adrian Sofield Architect.

Following a military coup in December 2006, relations between Australia and Fiji grew increasingly strained. On 3 November 2009, Fijian military leader and interim Prime Minister, Frank Bainimarama, declared the Australian and New Zealand high commissioners as Persona non grata, and high commissioner James Batley was recalled. In July 2012, the governments agreed to again exchange high commissioners, ending the three-year gap, with an Australian high commissioner commencing in December 2014 following the first elections in the country held since 2006 in September 2014.

== Heads of mission ==
#	Officeholder	Title	Other offices	Term start date	Term end date	Time in office	Notes
1	R. N. Hamilton	Commissioner		4 March 1964	5 December 1966	2 years, 276 days	
−	Douglas Sturkey (Acting)	Commissioner		5 December 1966	4 March 1967	89 days	
2	Robert Birch (Acting)	Commissioner		4 March 1967	10 October 1970	3 years, 315 days	
2	Robert Birch (Acting)	High Commissioner	^{A}^{B}	10 October 1970	13 January 1971	3 years, 315 days	
3	Rowen Osborn	High Commissioner	^{A}^{B}	13 January 1971	February 1973	2 years	
4	Harold Bullock	High Commissioner	^{A}^{B}	February 1973	August 1976	3 years, 6 months	
5	Gordon Upton	High Commissioner	^{A}^{B}	August 1976	December 1979	3 years, 4 months	
6	Raymond Greet	High Commissioner	^{C}	February 1980	May 1982	2 years, 3 months	
7	Colin McDonald	High Commissioner	^{C}	May 1982	June 1984	2 years, 1 month	
8	Jeremy Hearder	High Commissioner	^{C}	June 1984	June 1986	2 years	
9	John Piper	High Commissioner	^{C}	June 1986	16 October 1987	1 year, 4 months	
Relations suspended following the 1987 Fijian coups d'état
10	Bob Cotton	Ambassador	^{C}	30 March 1988	August 1991	3 years, 4 months	
11	John Trotter	Ambassador	^{C}	August 1991	April 1995	3 years, 8 months	
12	Greg Urwin	Ambassador	^{C}	April 1995	1 October 1997	4 years, 3 months	
12	Greg Urwin	High Commissioner	^{C}^{D}	1 October 1997	July 1999	4 years, 3 months	
13	Susan Boyd	High Commissioner	^{C}^{D}	July 1999	July 2003	4 years	
14	Jennifer Rawson	High Commissioner	^{C}^{D}	July 2003	January 2007	3 years, 6 months	
15	James Batley	High Commissioner	^{C}^{D}	January 2007	3 November 2009	2 years, 10 months	
−	Glenn Miles (Acting)	High Commissioner	^{C}^{D}^{E}	3 November 2009	2 December 2014	5 years, 29 days	
16	Margaret Twomey	High Commissioner	^{E}	2 December 2014	November 2017	2 years, 334 days	
17	John Feakes	High Commissioner	^{E}	November 2017	1 September 2022	4 years, 10 months	
−	John Williams (Acting)	High Commissioner	^{E}	1 September 2022	3 July 2023	4 years, 75 days	
18	Ewen McDonald	High Commissioner	^{E}	3 July 2023	incumbent	3 years, 135 days	

=== Notes ===
^A Also non-resident high commissioner of Australia to Western Samoa, 1970–1979.
^B Also non-resident high commissioner of Australia to Tonga, 1970–1979.
^C Also non-resident high commissioner of Australia to Tuvalu, 1977–2014.
^D Also non-resident high commissioner of Australia to Nauru, 1998–2010.
^E Also permanent representative of Australia to the Pacific Islands Forum, since 2014.
