= Council of Regional Organisations in the Pacific =

The Council of Regional Organisations in the Pacific (CROP) is an inter-organisational consultative process which aims to prevent either overlaps, or gaps, appearing between the work-programmes of its various members.

== Overview ==
Membership includes the Pacific Islands Forum Secretariat, the Pacific Community (SPC), the Pacific Islands Forum Fisheries Agency, the Secretariat of the Pacific Regional Environment Programme (SPREP), the South Pacific Tourism Organisation, the University of the South Pacific (USP), the Pacific Islands Development Programme, and the Pacific Power Association (PPA). Before their integration into SPC in 2010 and 2011, the South Pacific Applied Geoscience Commission and the South Pacific Board for Educational Assessment had been individual members. The Fiji School of Medicine was a member before its merger into Fiji National University in 2010.

CROP heads of organisations meet once each year, but the main consultative work is done by a series of sectoral working groups, including Marine Resources, Health and Population, Land Resources, Education, Information and Communication Technologies, etc. These working groups are responsible for collaboratively working on various regional projects and policy initiatives. For example, the CROP Marine Sector Working Group has shepherded the intergovernmental agreement and promotion of the Pacific Islands Regional Ocean Policy while the CROP ICT Working Group has shepherded the Pacific Islands ICT Policy and Strategic Plan (PIIPP).

The CROP interagency working groups also provide technical advice to Pacific Islands Forum intergovernmental working groups taking part in United Nations and other international negotiations and processes, on request.

Since the implementation of the Pacific Plan and its replacement, the Framework for Pacific Regionalism, the role of the CROP working groups has diminished. Their role was reviewed in 2015.
