= List of high commissioners of Australia to Tuvalu =

High Commissioner of Australia to Tuvalu

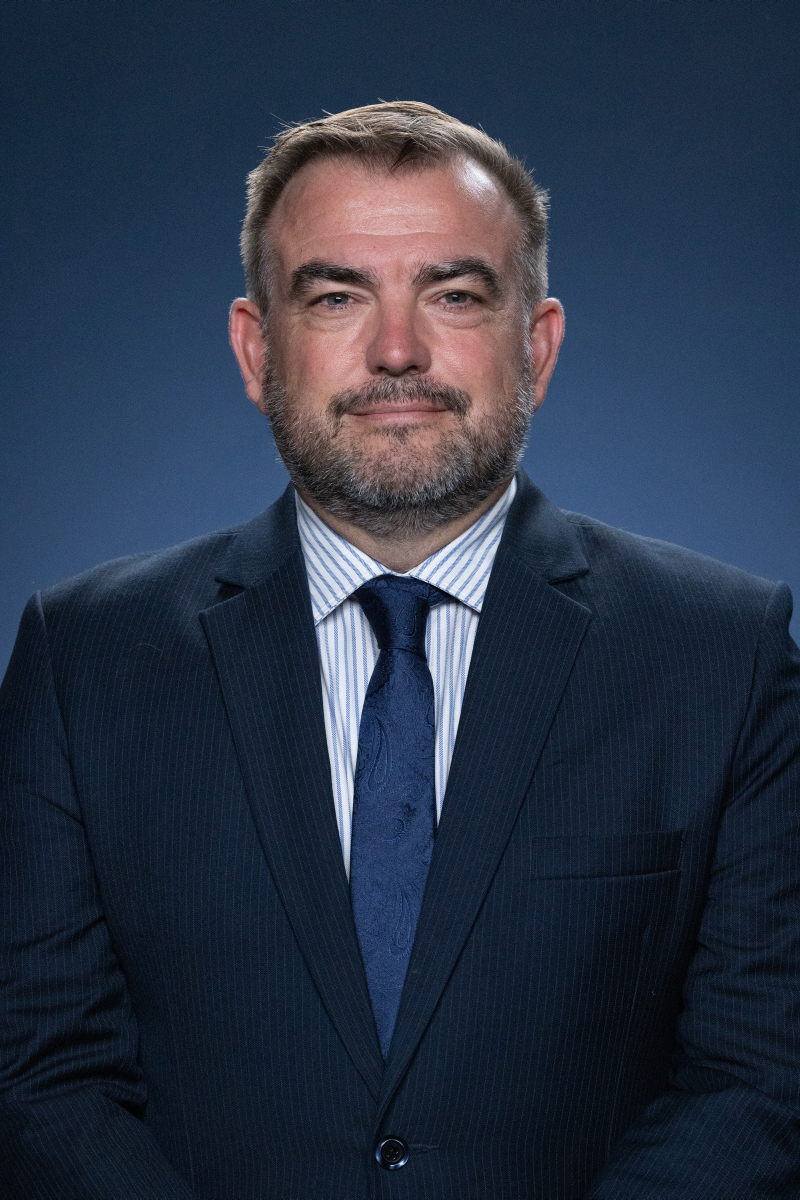
- Incumbent; David Charlton since 23 October 2024
- Department of Foreign Affairs and Trade
- Style: His Excellency
- Reports to: Minister for Foreign Affairs
- Residence: Tuvalu Road, Vaiaku
- Seat: Funafuti
- Nominator: Prime Minister of Australia
- Appointer: Governor General of Australia
- Inaugural holder: Gordon Upton (Non-resident)
- Formation: 30 November 1977
- Website: Australian High Commission, Funafuti

The High Commissioner of Australia to Tuvalu is an officer of the Australian Department of Foreign Affairs and Trade and the head of the High Commission of the Commonwealth of Australia in Tuvalu. The position has the rank and status of an ambassador extraordinary and plenipotentiary and the High Commissioner resides in Funafuti. The High Commissioner since August 2023 is Brenton Garlick. There has been a resident Australian High Commissioner in Tuvalu since October 2018, and the Australian High Commission is one of only two resident diplomatic missions in Tuvalu, the other being the Embassy of Taiwan

== Posting history ==
Prior to the independence of Tuvalu on 1 October 1978, the High Commission in Suva was accredited to Tuvalu, with the High Commissioner (1977–2014) and Deputy High Commissioner (2014–2018) serving as the non-resident accredited High Commissioner to Tuvalu. In the 2018 Australian Federal budget, funding was allocated to establish a High Commission in Tuvalu, becoming one of only two diplomatic missions in Tuvalu (the other being the Embassy of Taiwan). A resident High Commissioner to Tuvalu was appointed in 2018, and the High Commission was officially opened in 2019.

== Heads of mission ==
#	Officeholder	Residency	Term start date	Term end date	Time in office	Notes
1	Gordon Upton	Suva, Fiji	30 November 1977	December 1979	1–2 years	
2	Raymond Greet	Suva, Fiji	February 1980	May 1982	2 years, 3 months	
3	Colin McDonald	Suva, Fiji	May 1982	June 1984	2 years, 1 month	
4	Jeremy Hearder	Suva, Fiji	June 1984	June 1986	2 years	
5	John Piper	Suva, Fiji	June 1986	16 October 1987	1 year, 4 months	
6	Bob Cotton	Suva, Fiji	30 March 1988	August 1991	3 years, 4 months	
7	John Trotter	Suva, Fiji	August 1991	April 1995	3 years, 8 months	
8	Greg Urwin	Suva, Fiji	April 1995	July 1999	4 years, 3 months	
9	Susan Boyd	Suva, Fiji	July 1999	July 2003	4 years	
10	Jennifer Rawson	Suva, Fiji	July 2003	January 2007	3 years, 6 months	
11	James Batley	Suva, Fiji	January 2007	3 November 2009	2 years, 10 months	
−	Glenn Miles (Acting)	Suva, Fiji	3 November 2009	2 December 2014	5 years, 29 days	
12	Karinda D’Aloisio	Suva, Fiji	2 December 2014	June 2016	1 year, 5 months	
13	Amy Crago	Suva, Fiji	June 2016	26 October 2018	2 years, 4 months	
14	Karyn Murray	Funafuti	26 October 2018	6 October 2021	2 years, 345 days	
15	Robin McKenzie	Funafuti	6 October 2021	1 June 2023	5 years, 19 days	
16	Brenton Garlick	Funafuti	4 September 2023	23 October 2024	3 years, 51 days	
17	David Charlton	Funafuti	23 October 2024	Incumbent	2 years, 2 days	

== See also ==
- Australia–Tuvalu relations
- Foreign relations of Tuvalu
- Foreign relations of Australia
