= Etangit Karamwen Naoero Community Sports Complex =

Sports venue in Nauru

Coordinates: 0.5454°S 166.9145°E

- Interactive map of Etangit Karamwen Naoero Community Sports Complex
- Location: Yaren District, Nauru
- Capacity: 500

Construction
- Groundbreaking: 7 November 2017
- Opened: Autumn 2018
- Cost: $5.9 million AUD
- Architects: Alexander & Lloyd Group

Tenant
- Nauru Olympic Committee

Etangit Karamwen Naoero Community Sports Complex (or "A Place of Play" in Nauruan) is an indoor sports arena in the Yaren District of the Pacific island nation of Nauru.

The complex is Nauru's first national indoor sports facility and is designed to be utilized by all of Nauru's sporting community. The building was constructed using funds from Australia's Department of Foreign Affairs & Trade. The complex has seating for 500 spectators. The facility provides space for powerlifting, weight lifting, judo, wrestling, boxing, Zumba, yoga and aerobics, etc.

== History ==
A groundbreaking ceremony at the site on 7 November 2017 was attended by dignitaries including the Australian High Commissioner to Nauru John Donnelly and President of Nauru Baron Waqa. Construction of the facility was expected to be complete by August 2018.

One of the first events held at the complex was the 2019 Powerlifting Championship Challenge in January 2019 in honour of Nauru's 50th anniversary.
