= List of high commissioners of Australia to Samoa =

High Commissioner of Australia to Samoa

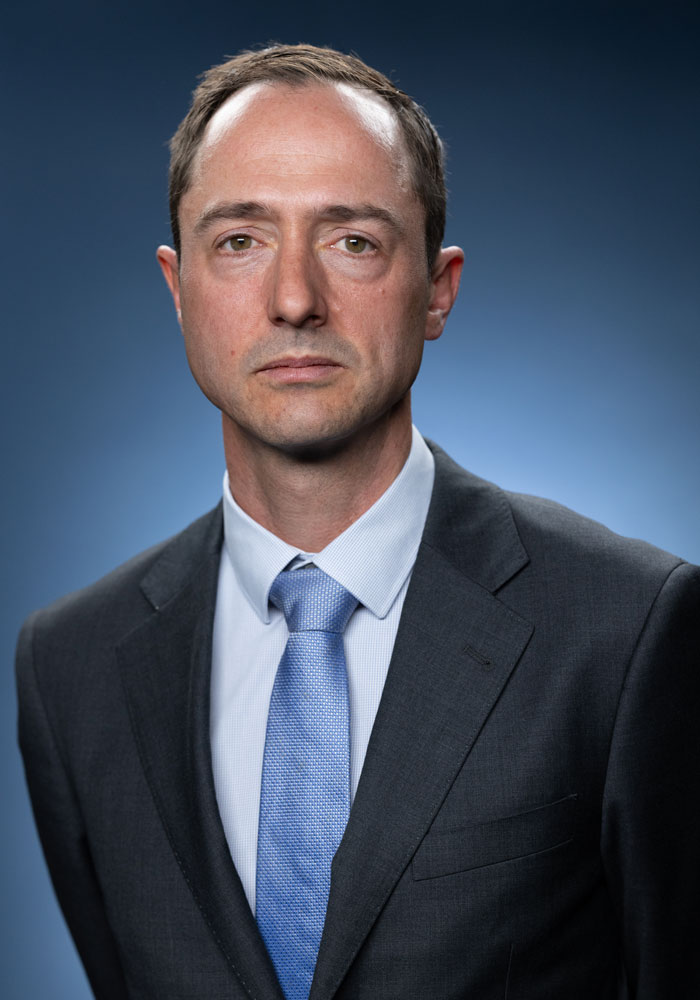
- Incumbent; Will Robinson since 20 January 2024
- Department of Foreign Affairs and Trade
- Style: His Excellency
- Reports to: Minister for Foreign Affairs
- Residence: Apia, Samoa
- Nominator: Prime Minister of Australia
- Appointer: Governor General of Australia
- Inaugural holder: Robert Birch
- Formation: 13 December 1970
- Website: Australian High Commission, Independent State of Samoa

The high commissioner of Australia to Samoa is an officer of the Australian Department of Foreign Affairs and Trade and the head of the High Commission of the Commonwealth of Australia in Apia, Samoa (formerly known as Western Samoa until 4 July 1997). The position has the rank and status of an ambassador extraordinary and plenipotentiary and the high commissioner is also responsible for relations with American Samoa, an unincorporated territory of the United States. The current high commissioner since January 2024 is His Excellency William Robinson.

== Posting history ==
On 13 December 1970, the Australian high commissioner in Suva, Fiji, Robert Birch, was appointed as the non-resident accredited high commissioner to Western Samoa, and accreditation was held by the high commissioners in Suva until September 1977. On 23 March 1977, during a visit of Samoan prime minister Tui Ātua Tupua Tamasese Efi to Australia, Prime Minister Malcolm Fraser announced the establishment of an Australian High Commission in Apia, with an acting high commissioner appointed on 20 September 1977 to hold office until the appointment of a resident high commissioner, which was achieved in October 1979.

== Heads of mission ==
#	Officeholder	Residency	Term start date	Term end date	Time in office	Notes
1	Robert Birch	Suva, Fiji	13 December 1970	13 January 1971	31 days	
2	Rowen Osborn	Suva, Fiji	13 January 1971	February 1973	2 years	
3	Harold Bullock	Suva, Fiji	February 1973	August 1976	3 years, 6 months	
4	Gordon Upton	Suva, Fiji	August 1976	20 September 1977	1 year, 1 month	
−	Greg Urwin (Acting)	Apia	20 September 1977	October 1979	2 years	
5	Allan Deacon	Apia	October 1979	1 December 1981	2 years, 2 months	
6	K. R. Fraser	Apia	1 December 1981	June 1984	2 years, 6 months	
7	Tony Godfrey-Smith	Apia	June 1984	October 1988	4 years, 4 months	
8	Basil Teasey	Apia	October 1988	November 1991	3 years, 1 month	
9	David Ritchie	Apia	November 1991	January 1995	3 years, 2 months	
10	David Hegarty	Apia	January 1995	January 1998	3 years	
11	Paul O'Callaghan	Apia	January 1998	January 2001	3 years	
12	Peter Hooton	Apia	January 2001	January 2004	3 years	
13	Phillip Allars	Apia	January 2004	January 2007	3 years	
14	Matt Anderson	Apia	January 2007	January 2012	5 years	
15	Stephen Henningham	Apia	January 2012	February 2014	2 years, 1 month	
16	Sue Langford	Apia	February 2014	March 2018	4 years, 1 month	
17	Sara Moriarty	Apia	March 2018	18 June 2021	3 years, 3 months	
18	Emily Luck	Apia	22 June 2021	Incumbent	5 years, 140 days	
