= Greg Urwin =

Australian diplomat (1946–2008)

Greg Urwin PSM CSI

Secretary General of the Pacific Islands Forum
- In office 16 May 2004 – 2 May 2008
- Preceded by: Noel Levi
- Succeeded by: Feleti Teo

Personal details
- Born: August 1946 Lithgow, New South Wales, Australia
- Died: 9 August 2008 (aged 61–62) Apia, Samoa
- Spouse: Penny Clark
- Occupation: Diplomat

Gregory Lawrence Urwin PSM CSI (August 1946 – 9 August 2008) was an Australian career diplomat and top Pacific specialist. Urwin held the post of Secretary General of the Pacific Islands Forum, an important inter-governmental regional organisation from 2004 until 2 May 2008. Urwin had been the longest serving Australian diplomat in the Pacific at the time of his death in 2008. Urwin was also the first non-Pacific Islander to become Secretary General of the Pacific Islands Forum.

During his tenure as a diplomat and Secretary General of the Pacific Islands Forum, Urwin was considered to be instrumental in the rebuilding of failed states and promotion of political stability in the region - especially with the RAMSI mission in the Solomon Islands.

== Early life ==
Greg Urwin was born in Lithgow, New South Wales, Australia, to parents Frank and Verna Urwin. The family relocated to the Wollongong area and then to Oak Flats when Urwin was ten years old. Urwin initially attended elementary school at Fairy Meadow Public School. Urwin then attended Wollongong High School where he became school captain.

Urwin completed undergraduate studies in history with honours at the University of Sydney where he was also senior student at Wesley College.

== Career ==
=== Diplomat ===
Urwin entered the Australian Department of Foreign Affairs and Trade, or DFAT, in 1971 following his graduation from the University of Sydney. His first diplomatic posting for DFAT was 1971–1974 to the Australian embassy in Ottawa, the capital of Canada.

Urwin's work as a Pacific region specialist began in 1977 when he was posted to Apia, Samoa from Canberra, to open Australia's first diplomatic mission in the Polynesian nation. Urwin was seconded to Secretary of Foreign Affairs of Samoa in 1979. In this capacity, Urwin assisted Samoa in developing its international foreign policy.

Urwin's later Pacific diplomatic assignments included serving as Australian High Commissioner in Fiji and Vanuatu and the deputy head of the Australian mission in New Zealand. Through his diplomatic postings in large nations, Urwin was often accredited to smaller Pacific island states as well.

Urwin's first marriage to Louise Dauth ended while he was Apia. He married his second wife, Penny Clark, a Samoan widow with three sons.

Urwin often returned to Canberra, Australia, between diplomatic postings, where he often served as a special envoy for the government or as an international election observer. Despite his overseas positions, Urwin remained active and in tune to Australian domestic politics.

Urwin was part of the Australian delegation to the 2000 Pacific Islands Forum summit in Kiribati. Urwin was considered to be a very important drafter of the Biketawa Declaration, which was signed at the Kiribati summit. The Biketawa Declaration, named after the island of Biketawa where negotiations took place, provided a firm political framework for regional cooperation on Pacific island security for the first time. The Declaration established a mechanism by which Forum countries could come to the assistance of its members. The Biketawa Declaration came against a backdrop of increased political instability throughout Melanesia at the time. George Speight had recently staged the 2000 Fijian coup d'état during the same year and the Solomon Islands were nearly brought to civil war due to ethnic tensions on the island of Guadalcanal.

Urwin was considered to be an instrumental voice in the application of the Biketawa Declaration to the Solomons Island Crisis. Urwin applied the declaration to the crisis and gathered regional support for the Regional Assistance Mission to Solomon Islands, or RAMSI, which was sent to the Solomon Islands in 2003 to help quell the ethnic violence and remains to this day. RAMSI stabilised the nation and allowed the government of the Solomon Islands to rebuild its administration and the economy.

=== Pacific Islands Forum ===
Urwin's skill as a diplomat and his handling of the Solomon Islands tension earned him a reputation of having an awareness of the sensibilities of Pacific Island leaders and local culture.

In 2004, Australian Prime Minister John Howard backed Urwin as a candidate for Secretary General of the Pacific Islands Forum. Leaders of some neighbouring island states, notably Papua New Guinea, opposed Urwin's nomination, not because they disliked Urwin, but because they feared perceived Australian political domination of the Forum and the region at large, especially by Howard, whom they viewed as heavy-handed. Some Pacific Island nations said that they would prefer someone of Pacific Islander descent. Ultimately though Urwin won the nomination.

Urwin competed against three other candidates, all Pacific Islanders, whose nominations were also put forth for Secretary General – lawyer Tuala Donald Kerslake of Samoa; Vinci Clodumar of Nauru, the country's permanent representative to the United Nations; and Langi Kavaliku a doctor from Tonga. Ultimately, despite some opposition, Urwin prevailed and became the first Australian Secretary General of the Pacific Islands Forum in 2004.

As Secretary General, Urwin played a central role in the adoption of the Pacific Plan at the Pacific Islands Forum summit in Port Moresby in October 2005. The Pacific Plan is a "co-operation scheme" which is based on four "pillars" to promote regional cooperation and integration in Pacific Island nations: economic growth, sustainable development, good governance and security. Urwin also worked to promote dialogue between the Pacific Islands Forum and other regional activists and organisations. In 2007, the leaders of the Pacific Islands Forum voted to give non-governmental organisations, or NGOs, a "consultative relationship" with their annual summits and the Pacific Islands Forum Secretariat.

Urwin was unanimously reappointed to a second three-year term as Secretary General of the Pacific Islands Forum in October 2006. Unlike his first nomination, Urwin ran unopposed.

Greg Urwin resigned as Secretary General of the Pacific Islands Forum in 2008 due to cancer. Tongan Prime Minister Feleti Sevele, who was serving as Chairman of the Pacific Islands Forum at the time, announced that he received Urwin's letter of resignation on 2 May 2008 saying, "We all wish him well and a speedy recovery." Deputy Secretary General Feleti Teo of Tuvalu became acting Secretary General following Urwin's resignation.

Ultimately, Tuiloma Neroni Slade of Samoa, a former justice at the International Criminal Court, was chosen to permanently succeed Urwin at the 39th Pacific Islands Forum Leaders conference in Alofi, Niue, in August 2008.

== Awards ==
In 2001, Urwin was awarded the Australian Public Service Medal for "Outstanding Contribution to the Development of Australia's Relationship with the Pacific." He was awarded the Centenary Medal for "outstanding public service" in advancing Australia's position in the Pacific.

Solomon Islands Prime Minister Derek Sikua posthumously awarded Urwin the Cross of Solomon Islands "in recognition of his outstanding contribution to RAMSI." The Cross of Solomon Islands is the highest civilian award given in the Solomon Islands and the country's second highest award overall. Sikua will present the award to Urwin's widow in a future ceremony.

== Death ==
Urwin returned from Suva, Fiji, to his home in Apia just two weeks before his death. He died of cancer in Apia, Samoa, on 9 August 2008, at the age of 61. He had been suffering from cancer and heart problems for the previous eight months. Urwin was survived by his second wife, Penny and their three sons, Wylie, Geoff and Daryl; his parents, Frank and Verna, of Queanbeyan, Australia; and his brother, Neil, of Murrumbateman.

Urwin was buried at the Keil Family grounds in Lotopa, Samoa, on 14 August 2008.

Memorial services were held in Apia, Samoa; Suva, Fiji and Canberra, Australia at which many leaders from the region were in attendance.

Tuiloma Neroni Slade, who ascended to Secretary General of the Pacific Islands Forum in August 2008, promised to continue the work of Urwin following his death.

=== Reactions ===
Reactions to Urwin's death poured in from across the Pacific region where he had worked as a diplomat for more than 30 years.

Pacific Islands Forum – Acting Secretary General Feleti Teo, who succeeded Urwin in May 2008, praised Urwin as the "architect of the Pacific Plan." Teo described Urwin as "a very humble person and very sensitive to many cultures that make up the membership of the Pacific Islands Forum family."

French Polynesia – President Gaston Tong Sang called Urwin's death a "major loss" and praised him for granting French Polynesia and New Caledonia associate member status during his time as secretary general.

New Zealand – Prime Minister Helen Clark said of Urwin, "The South Pacific was where Greg made his home. His enthusiasm and love of our region was very evident in the way he went about his work. Greg was a strong advocate for the Pacific and his passing is a great loss."

Papua New Guinea – Prime Minister Sir Michael Somare sent condolences to Urwin's wife, Penny Urwin. Somare called Urwin "A man of the Pacific, from the Pacific and for the Pacific," who left a legacy of strengthened Pacific cooperation.

Solomon Islands – Prime Minister Derek Sikua called Urwin's death a great loss to the region and the Pacific Islands Forum. He commended Urwin for his work on the Regional Assistance Mission to Solomon Islands and his understanding of the Pacific Islands region.

Tonga – Prime Minister Feleti Sevele called Urwin a "real son of the Pacific" and praised his work on the Pacific Plan.

== Obituaries ==
- Smith, Stephen (11 August 2008), Mr Greg Urwin PSM, archived from the original on 15 March 2014
- "Forum Leaders honour the late Greg Urwin" (Press release). Samoa: Pacific Islands Forum Secretariat. 21 August 2008. Archived from the original on 8 August 2012.
- Teo, Feleti P. (27 August 2008), Eulogy for the late Greg Urwin by ASG Feleti Teo, Pacific Islands Forum Secretariat, archived from the original on 19 April 2014
- McDonald, Hamish; Komai, Makereta (15 August 2008). "Careful diplomat brokered regional co-operation". The Sydney Morning Herald. Australia: Fairfax Media. Archived from the original on 2 November 2012.
- "Greg Urwin: Diplomat had Pacific at Heart". The Dominion Post. New Zealand. 21 August 2008.
- Dobell, Graeme (12 August 2008), Vale Greg Urwin, Australia: Lowy Institute for International Policy, archived from the original on 27 July 2011
- Roggenveen, Sam (15 August 2008), Reader riposte: Another tribute to Greg Urwin, Lowy Institute for International Policy
- Fijian Daily Post, Fiji. 14 August 2008.
- Magick, Samantha (1 February 2005), Greg Urwin's Pacific: One Year on at the Pacific Islands Forum Secretariat, Pacific Magazine, archived from the original on 7 September 2008

Diplomatic posts
Preceded by Noel Levi	Secretary General of the Pacific Islands Forum; 2004–2008	Succeeded by Feleti Teo
Preceded by Joan Norwood	Australian High Commissioner to Vanuatu; 1985 – 1988	Succeeded by Keith Baker
Preceded by John Trotter	Australian Ambassador to Fiji; 1995 – 1999	Succeeded by Susan Boyd
Preceded by Denis Fitzgerald	Australian Ambassador to Nauru (resident in Suva); 1998 – 1999	Succeeded by Susan Boyd
