= List of ambassadors of Australia to Nepal =

Ambassador of Australia to Nepal

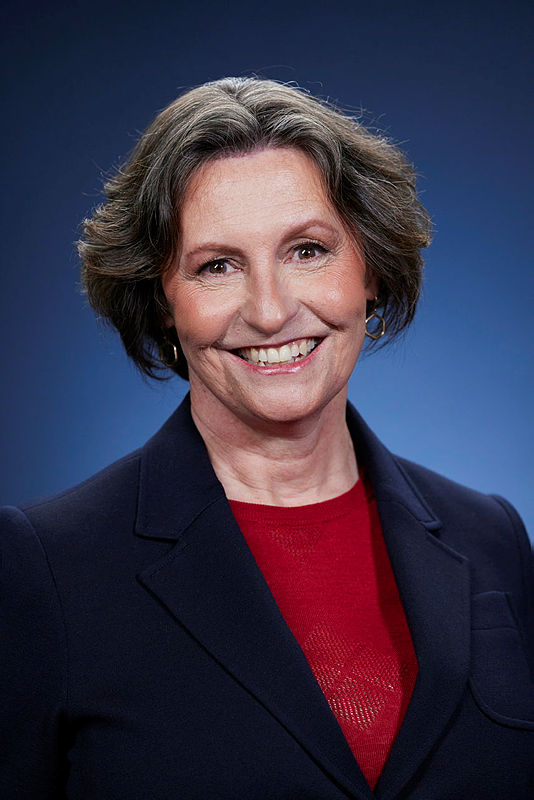
- Incumbent; Leann Johnston since 12 September 2024
- Department of Foreign Affairs and Trade
- Style: Her Excellency
- Reports to: Minister for Foreign Affairs
- Seat: Kathmandu
- Nominator: Prime Minister of Australia
- Appointer: Governor General of Australia
- Inaugural holder: Walter Crocker (resident in New Delhi)
- Formation: 26 February 1960
- Website: Australian Embassy Nepal

The ambassador of Australia to Nepal is an officer of the Australian Department of Foreign Affairs and Trade and the head of the Embassy of the Commonwealth of Australia to the Federal Democratic Republic of Nepal. The ambassador resides in Kathmandu. The position has the rank and status of an ambassador extraordinary and plenipotentiary and is currently held by Leann Johnston since 12 September 2024.

Between 1960 and 1986, Australian representation was carried out by a non-resident ambassador based in the Australian High Commission in New Delhi. The Australian Embassy in Kathmandu was opened on 27 April 1984, and the first ambassador appointed in May 1986. According to the Australian Government, the diplomatic mission was opened to improve consular services for Australians in Nepal and to facilitate the delivery of the Australian aid program to the country.

== List of heads of mission ==
#	Officeholder	Residency	Term start date	Term end date	Time in office	Notes
1	Walter Crocker	New Delhi, India	26 February 1960	5 March 1962	2 years, 7 days	
–	Kevin Thomas Kelly (Chargé d'affaires)	New Delhi, India	15 March 1962	10 June 1962	87 days	
–	Bill Pritchett (Chargé d'affaires)	New Delhi, India	10 June 1962	21 February 1963	256 days	
2	James Plimsoll	New Delhi, India	21 February 1963	28 January 1965	1 year, 342 days	
3	Arthur Tange	New Delhi, India	28 January 1965	25 January 1970	4 years, 362 days	
–	Rob Laurie (Chargé d'affaires)	New Delhi, India	25 January 1970	1 March 1970	35 days	
4	Patrick Shaw	New Delhi, India	1 March 1970	26 September 1973	3 years, 209 days	
5	Bruce Grant	New Delhi, India	26 September 1973	15 December 1975	2 years, 80 days	
6	Peter Curtis	New Delhi, India	26 February 1976	5 December 1979	3 years, 282 days	
7	Gordon Upton	New Delhi, India	5 December 1979	31 May 1984	4 years, 178 days	
8	Graham Feakes	New Delhi, India	31 May 1984	4 May 1986	1 year, 338 days	
–	A. J. Sever (Chargé d'affaires)	Kathmandu, Nepal	27 April 1984	4 May 1986	2 years, 7 days	
9	Diane Johnstone	Kathmandu, Nepal	4 May 1986	December 1989	3 years, 6 months	
10	Les Douglas	Kathmandu, Nepal	December 1989	13 April 1994	4 years, 4 months	
11	Annmaree O'Keeffe	Kathmandu, Nepal	13 April 1994	28 October 1996	2 years, 198 days	
12	Brendan Doran	Kathmandu, Nepal	28 October 1996	19 August 1999	2 years, 295 days	
13	Crispin Conroy	Kathmandu, Nepal	19 August 1999	22 July 2002	2 years, 337 days	
14	Keith Gardner	Kathmandu, Nepal	22 July 2002	28 October 2005	3 years, 98 days	
15	Graeme Lade	Kathmandu, Nepal	28 October 2005	22 January 2009	3 years, 86 days	
16	Susan Grace	Kathmandu, Nepal	22 January 2009	11 March 2013	4 years, 48 days	
17	Glenn White	Kathmandu, Nepal	11 March 2013	21 March 2017	4 years, 10 days	
18	Peter Budd	Kathmandu, Nepal	21 March 2017	19 March 2021	3 years, 363 days	
19	Felicity Volk	Kathmandu, Nepal	15 February 2021	26 August 2024	5 years, 240 days	
20	Leann Johnston	Kathmandu, Nepal	12 September 2024	incumbent	2 years, 65 days	

== See also ==
- Australia–Nepal relations
