= Pacific Islands ICT Policy and Strategic Plan =

The Pacific Islands ICT Policy and Strategic Plan was approved by Pacific Islands Forum leaders in 2000. The vision of the plan is Internet for Every Pacific Islander. This plan has been used as a template for developing national Information and Communication Technologies (ICT) policies in the Pacific Islands Forum countries. It has also been used for the World Summit on the Information Society.
