= List of ambassadors of Samoa to the United States =

Coordinates: 40.750054°N 73.971623°W

Ambassador of Samoa to United States
- Incumbent; Ali'ioaiga Feturi Elisaia since December 4, 2003
- Inaugural holder: Maiava Iulai Toma
- Formation: February 15, 1978

The Samoan ambassador in New York City is the official representative of the Government in Apia to the Government of the United States and is Permanent Representative next the Headquarters of the United Nations.

== List of representatives ==
Diplomatic agrément	Diplomatic accreditation	Ambassador	Observations	Prime Minister of Samoa	List of presidents of the United States	Term end
January 25, 1978	February 15, 1978	Maiava Iulai Toma		Tufuga Efi	Jimmy Carter	
November 16, 1989	December 18, 1989	Tuaopepe Fili Wendt		Tofilau Eti Alesana	George H. W. Bush	
May 3, 1993	May 3, 1993	Tuiloma Neroni Slade		Tofilau Eti Alesana	Bill Clinton	
October 3, 2003	December 4, 2003	Ali'ioaiga Feturi Elisaia		Tuilaepa Aiono Sailele Malielegaoi	George W. Bush	
May 28, 2021	June 3, 2021	Fatumanava-o-Upolu III Dr. Pa'olelei Luteru		Tuilaepa Aiono Sailele Malielegaoi	Joseph R. Biden Jr.	

- Samoa–United States relations
