= Barrie Dexter =

Australian diplomat (1921–2018)

Barrie Dexter CBE

Secretary of the Department of Aboriginal Affairs
- In office 9 January 1973 – 20 January 1977

Personal details
- Born: Barrie Graham Dexter; 15 July 1921 Kilsyth, Victoria, Australia
- Died: 13 April 2018 (aged 96) Canberra, Australia
- Occupation: Public servant

Barrie Graham Dexter CBE (15 July 1921 – 13 April 2018) was an Australian senior diplomat and public servant in the Department of External Affairs and the Department of Aboriginal Affairs.

== Early life ==
Born on 15 July 1921, Dexter was brought up in a series of Anglican vicarages and educated on a scholarship at Geelong Grammar School. His father had fought in the Boer War.

== Department of External Affairs ==
Dexter joined the Department of External Affairs as a cadet in 1948. He graduated from his cadetship alongside Neil Currie and Rowen Osborn.

Dexter went on to become a senior diplomat in the Department of External Affairs (called Department of Foreign Affairs from 1970 to 1987) with a number of postings including:

- London and Lebanon (Arabic language training) 1950–51
- Cairo – Egypt (3rd Secretary) 1951–53
- Karachi – Pakistan (1st Secretary) 1956–58
- Washington – USA 1960–63
- Accra – Ghana (Acting High Commissioner) 1963–64
- Vientiane – Laos (as Ambassador) 1964–68
- Belgrade – Yugoslavia, Romania and Bulgaria (as Ambassador) 1977–80
- Ottawa – Canada (as High Commissioner) 1980–82

His "experience in countries with indigenous and ethnic minorities" resulted in him being appointed to the Commonwealth Council for Aboriginal Affairs, formed to advise on national policy.

== Commonwealth Council for Aboriginal Affairs (1967–76) and Department of Aboriginal Affairs ==
Following the referendum in 1967 which removed provisions in the Australian Constitution which discriminated against Indigenous Australians, the Prime Minister Harold Holt invited Dexter to join the anthropologist W. E. H. Stanner and H. C. Coombs to form the Council for Aboriginal Affairs (CAA) and advise on national policy. The Prime Minister also asked Dexter to be the Head of the Office of Aboriginal Affairs. The Council for Aboriginal Affairs (CAA) was a triumvirate, comprising Dexter, Coombs and Stanner. The Council for Aboriginal Affairs led Australian policy on Aboriginal development, landownership and identity politics for almost a decade.

Dexter wrote that, when Holt drowned in December 1967, the advantages that the Council for Aboriginal Affairs had hoped for by being part of the Prime Minister's Department did not eventuate. The next Prime Minister John Gorton was not interested in Aboriginal affairs, and his department was unfriendly. Gorton subsequently appointed W.C. Wentworth as Minister-in-charge. Later when William McMahon became Prime Minister, the Council for Aboriginal Affairs became part of what Dexter called "an improbable creation", the Department of the Environment, Aborigines and the Arts. Dexter wrote that Wentworth "would have liked to see us dissolved" but despite strong opposition from some parts of the Government, the Council for Aboriginal Affairs succeeded in developing an evolving stance on Aboriginal development, landownership and identity politics, its relationship with successive departments, ministers and prime ministers and also emerging indigenous bodies. The Council had a deep and complicated involvement in indigenous policy formation.

Dexter held that position through successive political regimes, including the Whitlam government, which began to implement much of the program Dexter, Stanner and Coombs endorsed: land rights, the movement to outstations, increased social welfare and community-based economies. Dexter also employed Charles Perkins to the role of Research Officer.

The Council for Aboriginal Affairs was to function as a powerful, almost clandestine, agency that exercised considerable influence over federal Aboriginal affairs for more than a decade.

The Council and Dexter were instrumental in the development of Land Title policy for Australia.

Dexter was the inaugural Secretary of the Department of Aboriginal Affairs from its creation in late 1972 by Gough Whitlam, until his retirement from the Department in 1976. He returned to diplomatic duties.

He was appointed a Commander of the Order of the British Empire (CBE) in 1981.

== ANU Conference in 2005 ==
In 2005, the Australian National University commemorated the centenary of the birth of W.E.H. Stanner, one of its late professors of anthropology, with a conference discussing his lifetime achievements. Dexter presented on the pivotal role of the Council for Aboriginal Affairs.

== Personal life ==
Dexter was the fifth son of the Rev. and Mrs. W. E. Dexter, of East Malvern. Barrie married Judith McWalter Craig of Perth in 1950. His father performed the marriage ceremony.

Dexter was the Honorary Secretary of the Turner National Football Club for many years.

Dexter died in Canberra on 13 April 2018 at the age of 96.

== Books and publications ==
In 2015, Dexter published a memoir titled Pandora's Box about the Council for Aboriginal Affairs 1967-1976 in which he detailed his service in the pursuit of a better deal for Indigenous Australians under six prime ministers from Harold Holt to Malcolm Fraser. His book was widely publicised.

Government offices
Preceded by Lenox Hewitt	Secretary of the Department of Aboriginal Affairs; 1973–1977	Succeeded by David Hay
Diplomatic posts
Preceded by Bertram Ballard	Australian High Commissioner to Ghana (Acting); 1963–1964	Succeeded by John Ryan
Preceded by Arthur Morris	Australian Ambassador to Laos; 1965–1967	Succeeded by John Ryan
Preceded by John Ryan	Australian High Commissioner to Canada; 1980–1983	Succeeded by Rowen Osborn
