= List of high commissioners of Australia to Kiribati =

High Commissioner of Australia to Kiribati

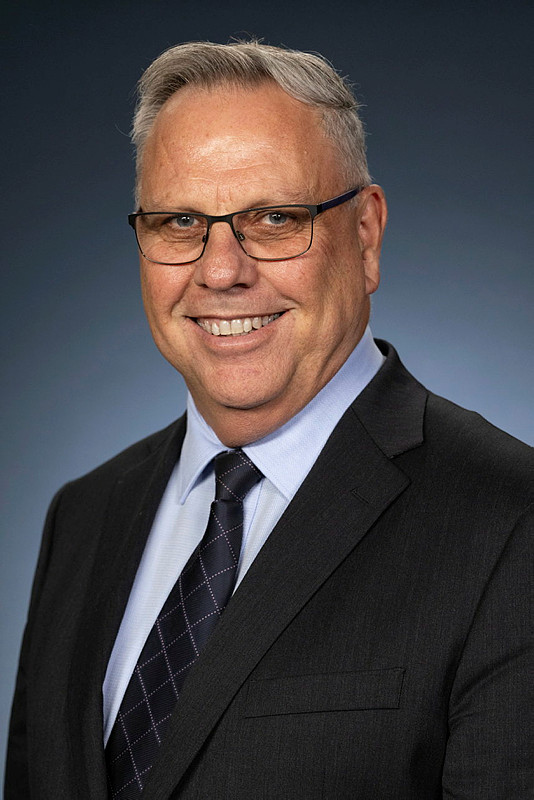
- Incumbent; Mark Foxe since 9 March 2025
- Department of Foreign Affairs and Trade
- Style: His Excellency
- Reports to: Minister for Foreign Affairs
- Residence: Tarawa
- Nominator: Prime Minister of Australia
- Appointer: Governor General of Australia
- Inaugural holder: John Mahoney
- Formation: 6 August 1982
- Website: Australian High Commission, Kiribati

The high commissioner of Australia to Kiribati is an officer of the Australian Department of Foreign Affairs and Trade and the head of the High Commission of the Commonwealth of Australia to Kiribati, located in Tarawa. The position has the rank and status of an ambassador extraordinary and plenipotentiary and is currently held by David Yardley. As fellow members of the Commonwealth of Nations, diplomatic relations between Australia and Kiribati are between high commissioners rather than ambassadors. The High Commission is one of four diplomatic missions in Kiribati, alongside New Zealand, Taiwan and Cuba. The High Commission supports and manages Australia's extensive Official Development Assistance program to Kiribati, which constitutes 31% of all ODA to the country (15% of Kiribati's GDP).

== Posting history ==
Australia formally recognised Kiribati on its independence from the United Kingdom in 1979, but diplomatic contacts were much earlier with the high commissioner in Nauru dual-accredited as Commissioner to the Gilbert and Ellice Islands (1972–1976) and the Gilbert Islands (1976–1979), and then non-resident accredited high commissioner to Kiribati from 1979. In 1981, The Australian Government announced that it would open a resident High Commission in Kiribati in recognition of "the importance which Australia attached to relations with not only Kiribati but to its regional neighbours in the South Pacific."

On 7 November 2003, Kiribati established diplomatic relations with the Republic of China (Taiwan), but it was alleged later on that the Australian high commissioner, Jurek Juszczyk, had urged President Anote Tong not to recognise Taiwan, as this would inevitably sever relations with China. Although Kiribati did not sever ties with the PRC, Beijing suspended ties on 29 November after failed attempts to lobby President Tong to change his mind.

== High commissioners ==
#	Officeholder	Residency	Term start date	Term end date	Time in office	Notes
1	Leslie Sellars (Commissioner)	Yaren, Nauru	January 1973	December 1974	1 year, 11 months	
2	Alan Fogg (Commissioner)	Yaren, Nauru	January 1975	May 1977	2 years, 4 months	
3	Maris King (Commissioner)	Yaren, Nauru	May 1977	July 1979	2 years, 2 months	
4	Oliver Cordell	Yaren, Nauru	July 1979	6 August 1982	3 years, 1 month	
5	John Mahoney	Tarawa	6 August 1982	March 1985	2 years, 6 months	
6	William Rowe	Tarawa	March 1985	August 1987	2 years, 5 months	
7	Peter Bassett	Tarawa	August 1987	September 1990	3 years, 1 month	
8	Laurie Maher	Tarawa	September 1990	February 1994	3 years, 5 months	
9	Stewart Brooks	Tarawa	February 1994	February 1997	3 years	
10	Phillip Allars	Tarawa	February 1997	February 2000	3 years	
11	Colin Hill	Tarawa	February 2000	February 2003	3 years	
12	Jurek Juszczyk	Tarawa	February 2003	April 2006	3 years, 2 months	
13	Anne Quinane	Tarawa	April 2006	April 2009	3 years	
14	Brett Aldam	Tarawa	April 2009	June 2012	3 years, 2 months	
15	George Fraser	Tarawa	June 2012	December 2015	3 years, 6 months	
16	Bruce Cowled	Tarawa	January 2016	19 March 2021	5 years, 2 months	
17	David Yardley	Tarawa	19 March 2021	Incumbent	5 years, 241 days	
