= List of ambassadors of Australia to Peru =

Ambassador of Australia to Peru

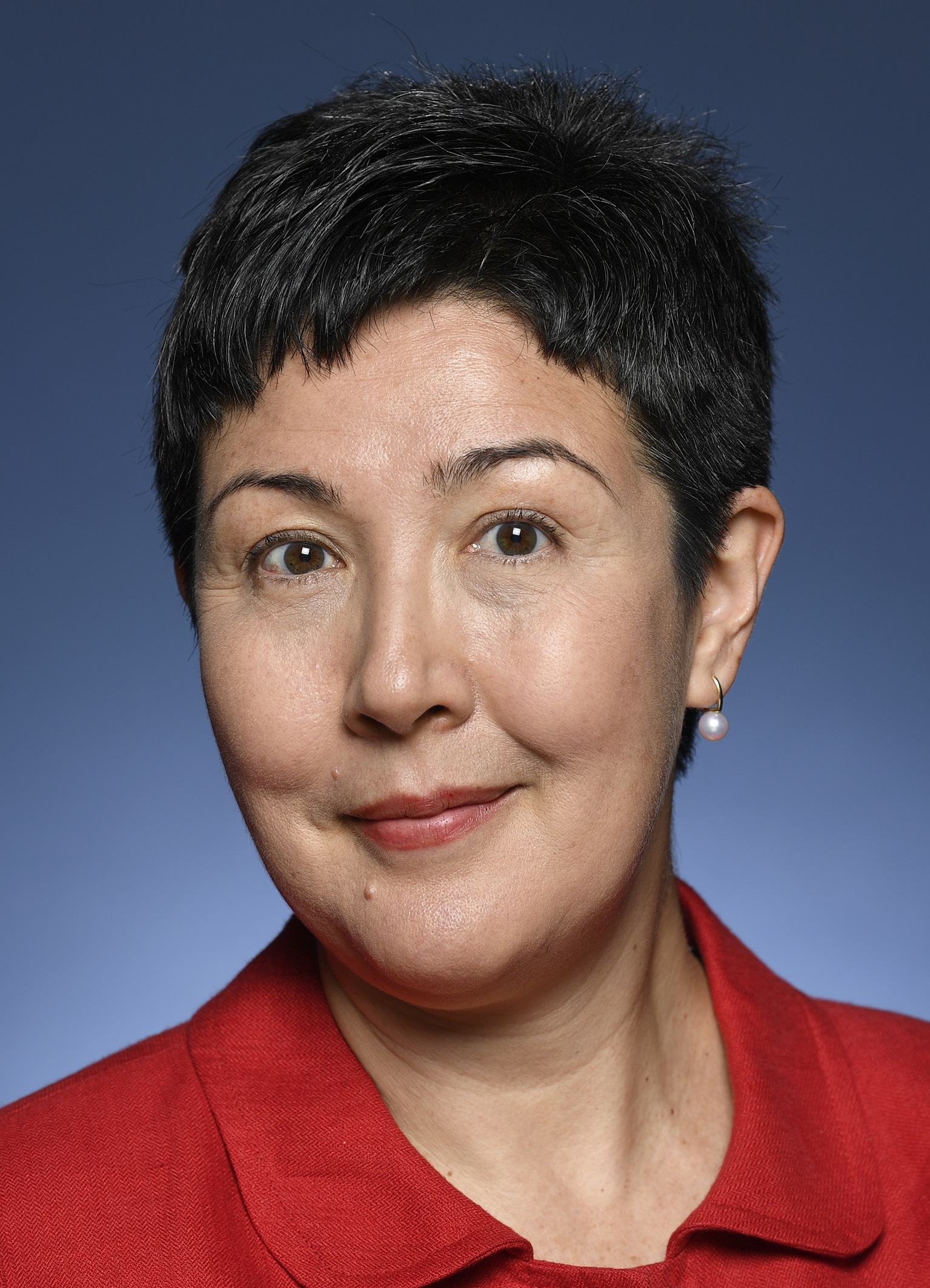
- Incumbent; Maree Ringland since 22 March 2022
- Department of Foreign Affairs and Trade
- Style: Her Excellency
- Reports to: Minister for Foreign Affairs
- Residence: Lima
- Nominator: Prime Minister of Australia
- Appointer: Governor General of Australia
- Inaugural holder: Dan Mackinnon (resident in Buenos Aires)
- Formation: 1972
- Website: Australian Embassy Lima

The ambassador of Australia to Peru is an officer of the Australian Department of Foreign Affairs and Trade and the head of the Embassy of the Commonwealth of Australia to the Republic of Peru. The position has the rank and status of an ambassador extraordinary and plenipotentiary and holds non-resident accreditation for Bolivia (since 2010). Prior to accreditation with Bolivia being transferred to the embassy in Lima, accreditation has been held variously by Ambassadors to Chile, Argentina and Brazil. The current ambassador, since March 2022, is Maree Ringland.

The Australian Government first announced it would open an embassy in Lima in 1968. The Australian Embassy in Peru was closed between 1986 and 2010, as a result of the 1986 Australian Government Budget.

== List of heads of mission ==
Ordinal	Officeholder	Other offices	Residency	Term start date	Term end date	Time in office	Notes
1	Dan Mackinnon CBE		Buenos Aires, Argentina	1968	1970	1–2 years	
2	Harry Bullock		Buenos Aires, Argentina	1970	1973	2–3 years	
3	Hugh Dunn		Buenos Aires, Argentina	1973	1973	0 years	
4	Allan Loomes OBE	^{A}	Lima, Peru	1974	1978	3–4 years	
5	Alan Fogg MBE	^{A}	Lima, Peru	1979	1980	0–1 years	
6	Jim Ferguson	^{A}	Lima, Peru	1981	1983	1–2 years	
7	G. S. F. Harding		Lima, Peru	1984	1986	1–2 years	
8	Kevin Flanagan		Santiago, Chile	1986	1987	0–1 years	
9	Malcolm Dan		Santiago, Chile	1987	1991	3–4 years	
10	Matthew Peek		Santiago, Chile	1991	1996	4–5 years	
11	Kenneth Berry		Santiago, Chile	1996	1997	0–1 years	
12	Susan Tanner		Santiago, Chile	1997	1999	1–2 years	
13	John Campbell		Santiago, Chile	1999	2002	2–3 years	
14	Elizabeth Schick		Santiago, Chile	2002	2005	2–3 years	
15	Crispin Conroy		Santiago, Chile	2005	2009	3–4 years	
16	Virginia Greville		Santiago, Chile	2009	2010	0–1 years	
17	John Woods	^{B}	Lima, Peru	2010	2014	3–4 years	
18	Nicholas Gerard McCaffrey	^{B}	Lima, Peru	2014	2018	3–4 years	
19	Diana Nelson	^{B}	Lima, Peru	December 2018	2022	3–4 years	
20	Maree Ringland	^{B}	Lima, Peru	22 March 2022		4 years, 169 days	

=== Notes ===
^A Also non-resident Australian Ambassador to the Republic of Colombia, 1976 to 1983.
^B Also non-resident Australian Ambassador to the Plurinational State of Bolivia, since 2010.
