= Maris King =

Australian diplomat

- Born: Maris Estelle King; 1922
- Died: 1997 (aged 74–75)
- Occupations: Public servant, diplomat

Maris Estelle King (1922–1997) was an Australian public servant and diplomat.

King began her Commonwealth Public Service career in 1942 as a typist in the Department of External Affairs. In 1943, King was posted to Chongqing, China. She was the first clerical officer that the Australian Government had sent abroad. From 1951 to 1954, whilst still an external affairs officer, King studied arts at the Canberra University College. She performed consistently well in her exams, including topping the Melbourne University examination class list in economics from 1952 to 1954.

King went on to become the second woman to head an Australian diplomatic mission, as Australian High Commissioner to Nauru from 1977 to 1979. In 1980 she was appointed Australia's first resident High Commissioner to Tonga. She arrived in May 1980, and was living in Nuku'alofa when Cyclone Isaac ravaged Tonga. No Australians were killed or injured in the storms.

King retired in 1984.

== Honours ==
In 2010, a street in Casey, Australian Capital Territory was named Maris King Street in King's honour. In late 2016, the Department of Foreign Affairs and Trade named one of its 16 meeting rooms in honour of King, in recognition of her work as a pioneering female diplomat.

Diplomatic posts
Preceded by Alan Fogg	Australian High Commissioner to Nauru; Australian High Commissioner to Kiribati; 1977–1979	Succeeded by Oliver Cordell
Preceded by Gordon Upton	Australian High Commissioner to Tonga; 1980–1984	Succeeded by Brian Smith
