= Allan Loomes =

Australian public servant and diplomat

Allan Loomes OBE
- Born: Allan Henry Loomes; 25 April 1917; Burrinjuck, New South Wales, Australia
- Died: 1 November 1990 (aged 73)
- Education: University of Sydney (BA, LLB (Hons))
- Occupations: Public servant, diplomat

Allan Henry Loomes OBE (25 April 1917 – 1 November 1990) was an Australian public servant and diplomat.

Born at Burrinjuck, New South Wales, Loomes was the youngest of four children.

After service in the RAAF during World War II, Loomes moved to Canberra in 1946 to join the Commonwealth Public Service in the Department of External Affairs. His appointments included ambassadorial roles in Burma, Thailand, South Korea, Peru and Venezuela. In 1976 Loomes received non-resident accreditation for Colombia as Australia's first ambassador, presenting his credentials to President Alfonso López Michelsen.

Loomes was appointed an Officer of the Order of the British Empire in January 1962.

Loomes died on 1 November 1990. In 2010, a street in Casey, Australian Capital Territory was named Loomes Lane in his honour.

Diplomatic posts
Preceded by Colin Moodie	Australian Ambassador to Burma; 1958–1961	Succeeded by Frederick Homer
Preceded by Malcolm Booker	Australian Ambassador to Thailand; 1964–1968	Succeeded by David McNicol
Preceded by Roy Albert Peachey	Australian Ambassador to South Korea; 1968–1971	Succeeded by Murray Bourchier
Preceded by Frederick Homer	Australian Ambassador to Venezuela; 1974–1978	Succeeded by Alan Fogg
Preceded by Hugh Dunn	Australian Ambassador to Peru; 1974–1978	Succeeded by Alan Fogg
