= List of ambassadors of Australia to Chile =

Ambassador of Australia to Chile

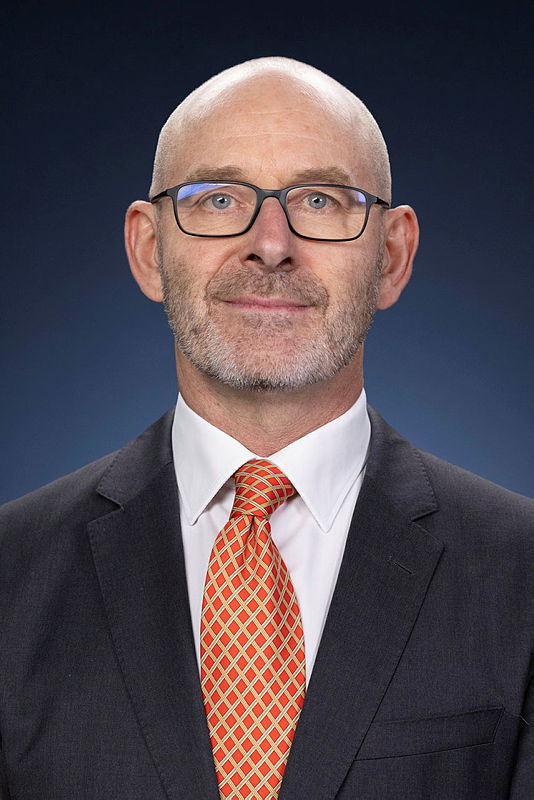
- Incumbent; Andrew Martin since 23 December 2024
- Department of Foreign Affairs and Trade
- Style: His Excellency
- Reports to: Minister for Foreign Affairs
- Residence: Santiago
- Nominator: Prime Minister of Australia
- Appointer: Governor General of Australia
- Inaugural holder: John Duncan (as Minister to Chile)
- Formation: 1946

The Ambassador of Australia to Chile is an officer of the Australian Department of Foreign Affairs and Trade and the head of the Embassy of the Commonwealth of Australia to the Republic of Chile. The ambassador resides in Santiago. The current ambassador, since February 2020, is Todd Mercer.

The post was first established in 1946, and was withdrawn in May 1949, as a cost saving measure by the Australian Government. The post reopened in 1968.

== List of heads of mission ==
Ordinal	Name	Office	Term start date	Term end date	Time in office	Notes
1	John Duncan	Minister to Chile	1946	1948	1–2 years	
n/a	John Cumpston	Chargé d'affaires	1948	1949	0–1 years	
n/a	Cavan Hogue	Chargé d'affaires	1968	1969	0–1 years	
2	Noël Deschamps	Ambassador to Chile	1969	1973	3–4 years	
n/a	Ian James	Chargé d'affaires	1973	1974	0–1 years	
n/a	Alan Brown	Chargé d'affaires	1974	1976	1–2 years	
3	Ian Nicholson	Ambassador to Chile	1976	1979	2–3 years	
4	Gerald Harding	Ambassador to Chile	1979	1983	3–4 years	
5	Kevin Flanagan	Ambassador to Chile	1983	1987	3–4 years	
6	Malcolm Dan	Ambassador to Chile	1987	1991	3–4 years	
7	Matthew Peek	Ambassador to Chile	1991	1996	4–5 years	
8	Kenneth Berry	Ambassador to Chile	1996	1997	0–1 years	
9	Susan Tanner	Ambassador to Chile	1997	1999	1–2 years	
10	John Campbell	Ambassador to Chile	1999	2002	2–3 years	
11	Elizabeth Schick	Ambassador to Chile	2002	2005	2–3 years	
12	Crispin Conroy	Ambassador to Chile	2005	2009	3–4 years	
13	Virginia Greville	Ambassador to Chile	2009	2012	2–3 years	
14	Tim Kane	Ambassador to Chile	2012	2016	3–4 years	
15	Robert Fergusson	Ambassador to Chile	January 2017	February 2020	3 years, 1 month	
16	Todd Mercer	Ambassador to Chile	February 2020	2023	3 years	
16	Andrew Martin	Ambassador to Chile	23 December 2024	incumbent	1 year, 9 months	
