= Ali'ioaiga Feturi Elisaia =

Samoan diplomat (born 1954)

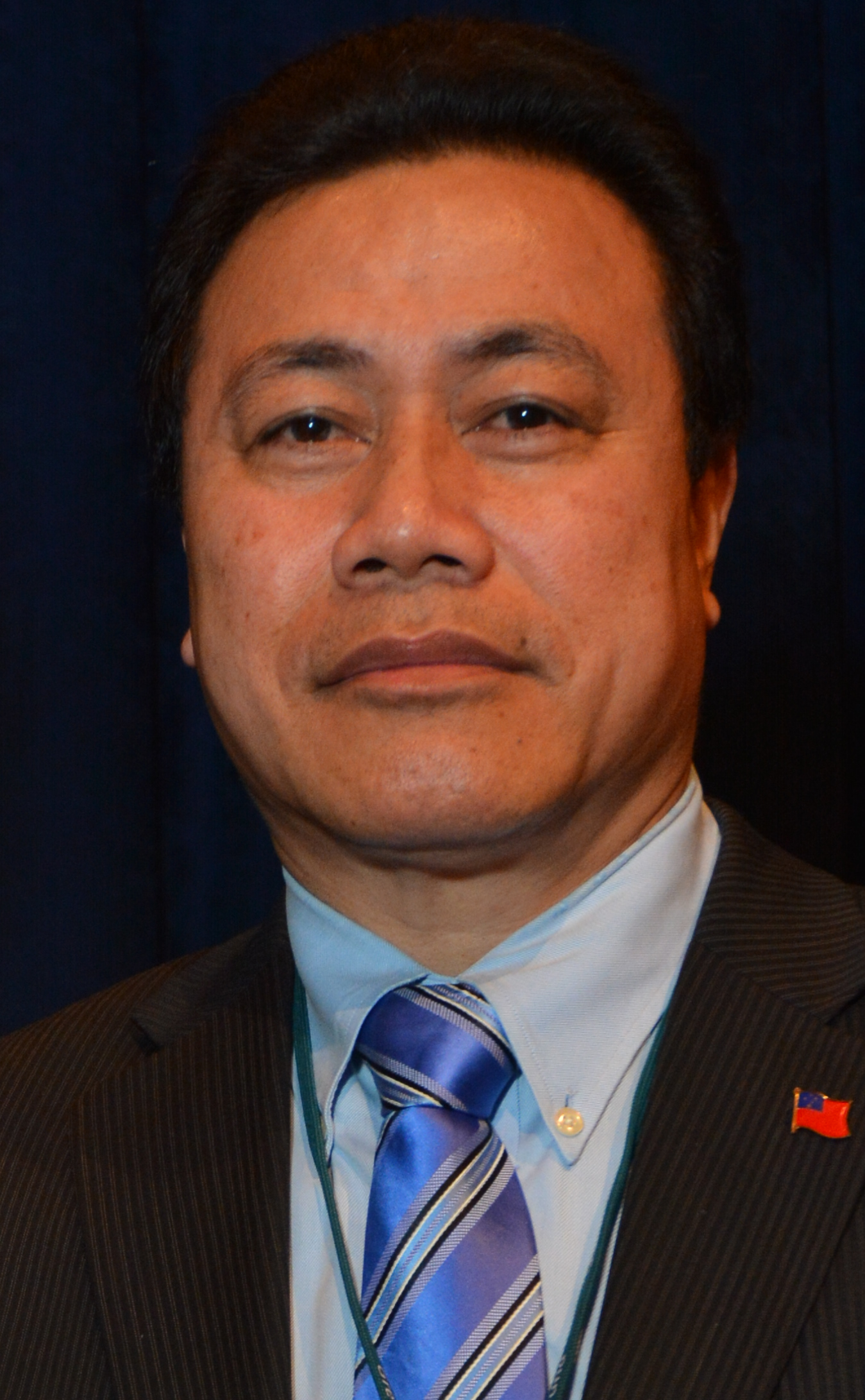
Elisaia in June 2014

Ali'ioaiga Feturi Elisaia (born 1954) is a Samoan diplomat. He was Samoa's Permanent Representative to the United Nations.

== Biography ==
Elisaia obtained a postgraduate certificate in diplomacy from Oxford University, and also holds a Bachelor of Arts degree in political science and administration from the University of the South Pacific. He first served in the Samoan Mission to the United Nations in 1979. From 1979 to 1981, he was acting division head, and then as division head, at the Economic and Aid Division of the Samoan Ministry of Foreign Affairs. From 1981 to 1984, he served as first secretary at Samoa's High Commission in New Zealand. He was deputy secretary for foreign affairs from 1984 to 1988, then co-director of the Hanns Seidel Foundation in Samoa from 1988 to 2001. From 2001 to 2003, he was assistant chief executive officer at the Samoan Ministry of Foreign Affairs. Elisaia was appointed Permanent Representative of Samoa to the United Nations and Samoan Ambassador to the United States in 2003. In 2021 he was appointed as high commissioner in Fiji. His term as high commissioner expired in August 2026.
