= Rowen Osborn =

Australian public servant and diplomat

- Born: 1924
- Died: February 2012 (aged 87); Yaouk, NSW
- Occupations: Public servant, diplomat
- Height: 180 cm (5 ft 11 in)
- Parent(s): Frances Helena Osborn (née d’Arenberg) and Francis Ernest Osborn

Rowen Frederick Osborn (1924 – February 2012) was an Australian public servant and diplomat.

Osborn was born in 1924. He was educated at Prince Alfred College in Adelaide.

In 1948 Osborn joined the Department of External Affairs as a cadet. He graduated from his cadetship alongside Neil Currie, and Barrie Dexter. He served in Karachi, The Hague, Tokyo and London between 1948 and 1970. He was Australian High Commissioner to Fiji and Tonga from 1970 to 1973, and to Samoa from 1972. In 1983 Osborn was appointed High Commissioner to Canada. He returned to Canberra from the posting in 1985.

Osborn died in February 2012, having been missing for several days.

Diplomatic posts
Preceded by Robert Birch	Australian High Commissioner to Fiji; Australian High Commissioner to Tonga; 1970–1973	Succeeded by H.W. Bullock
New title Post established	Australian High Commissioner to Samoa; 1972–1973	Succeeded by H.W. Bullock
Preceded by Barrie Dexter	Australian High Commissioner to Canada; 1983–1985	Succeeded by Robert Laurie
