= Tuiloma Neroni Slade =

Samoan politician and diplomat (born 1941)

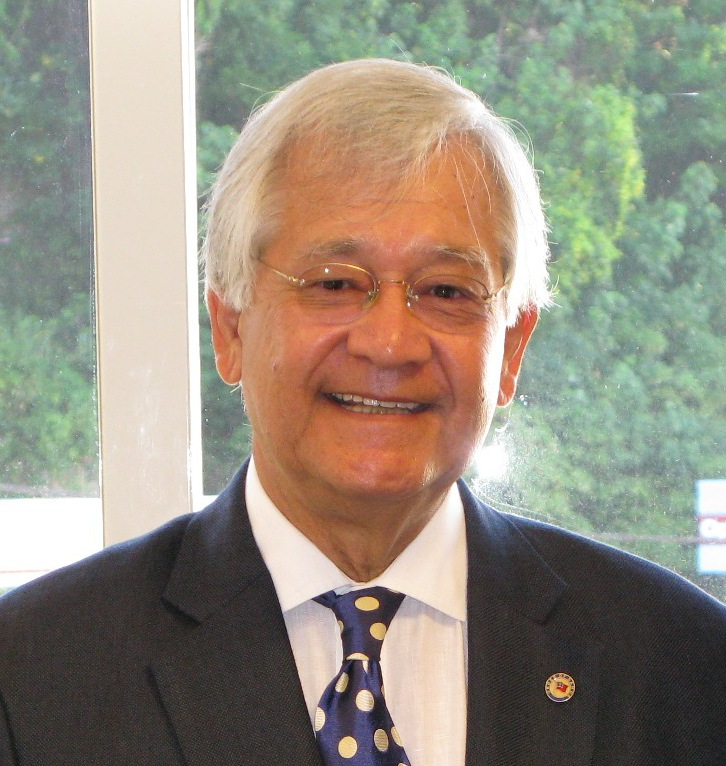

Secretary General of the Pacific Islands Forum
- In office 13 October 2008 – 4 December 2014
- Preceded by: Feleti Teo (acting)
- Succeeded by: Meg Taylor

Judge of the International Criminal Court
- In office 11 March 2003 – 10 March 2006
- Nominated by: Samoa
- Appointed by: Assembly of States Parties
- Succeeded by: Ekaterina Trendafilova

3rd Samoan Ambassador to the United States
- In office 3 May 1993 – 4 December 2003
- Prime Minister: Tofilau Eti Alesana; Tuila'epa Sa'ilele Malielegaoi
- Preceded by: Tuaopepe Fili Wendt
- Succeeded by: Ali'ioaiga Feturi Elisaia

Personal details
- Born: 8 April 1941 (age 85) Samoa
- Education: Victoria University of Wellington
- Occupation: Judge

Tuiloma Neroni Slade (born 8 April 1941) is a Samoan politician, diplomat and lawyer who held the post of secretary general of the Pacific Islands Forum Secretariat from 2008 to 4 December 2014. He was elected to the position for three years on 20 August 2008. Slade was reappointed to a second term by the leaders of the Pacific Islands Forum on 8 September 2011.

== Biography ==
Tuiloma Neroni Slade was born in Samoa on 8 April 1941. He graduated with a LL.B. from Victoria University of Wellington in New Zealand.

=== Career ===
Slade began his career as a Samoan lawyer, serving as the senior prosecutor for the attorney general and the Parliamentary Counsel to the Samoan government. He became the Attorney-General of Samoa in 1976 and remained in office until 1982.

Slade became the Samoan ambassador to the United States and permanent representative to the United Nations and a judge of the International Criminal Court. He was elected to the International Criminal Court in 2003 for a three-year term, and served as presiding judge of Pre-Trial Chamber II.

Before beginning a diplomatic career in 1993, Slade became the assistant director of the legal office for the Commonwealth Secretariat, based in London.

Slade served as a Samoan diplomat from 1993 until his appointment to the International Criminal Court in 2003. He was appointed Samoa's permanent representative to the United Nations in New York City. Slade concurrently served as both the Samoan Ambassador to the United States and the High Commissioner to Canada.

He has also served as chairman of the Alliance of Small Island States (AOSIS) from 1997 to 2003.

=== International Criminal Court ===
In 2003, Slade was elected to a three-year term as a justice of the International Criminal Court. During his tenure, Slade served as a Presiding Judge of Pre-Trial Chamber II at the International Criminal Court in The Hague, the Netherlands. He practised law as an international legal consultant from 2007 to 2008 after leaving the court.

=== Secretary general ===
Tuiloma Neroni Slade was appointed secretary general of the Pacific Islands Forum Secretariat on 20 August 2008 for a three-year term and took office on 13 October 2008. He was elected following the death of Secretary General Greg Urwin on 9 August 2008. He succeeded acting Secretary General Feleti Teo, who also sought appointment to a full term.

He announced his intention to seek reappointment to a second term in 2011. Slade's reappointment was openly opposed by the government Frank Bainimarama of Fiji, which has been suspended from the Pacific Islands Forum since 2009. Bainimarama put forth another candidate for nomination, former Fijian foreign minister Kaliopate Tavola, with the initial support of the members of the Melanesian Spearhead Group. Fiji released statements touting the opposition of the Pacific Islands Forum's Melanesian members to Slade's reappointment.

Despite Tavola's nomination, the leaders of the Pacific Islands Forum unanimously reappointed Slade for a second term on 8 September 2011, following a leaders' retreat on Waiheke Island in Auckland, New Zealand. He received full support from all members, including the Melanesian Spearhead Group. It is unknown if any Melanesian members put forth Tavola's nomination during the retreat. Slade thanked leaders for his renomination in a statement, "I sincerely thank the Forum Leaders for having confidence in me to lead their Secretariat for a second term. I will of course work to the best of my abilities to serve the Forum membership in pursuit of aspirations in the Leaders' Vision for a region of peace, harmony, security and economic prosperity, so that all our people can lead free and worthwhile lives."

Following his retirement, Slade was appointed to Samoa's Judicial Service Commission.

=== Awards and recognitions ===
Slade received the Elizabeth Haub Award for Environmental Diplomacy in 2001. He was the recipient of the Elisabeth Mann Borgese Medal and the Global Oceans Leadership Award, both in 2003 for his work on behalf of the oceans and developing, small island states. In 2005, he was awarded the Order of Samoa ù Poloaiga Sili a Samoa. In November 2016 he was awarded an honorary doctorate from Victoria University of Wellington.

In August 2026 he was one of ten legal professionals awarded a lifetime achievement award by the Samoa Law Society.

Diplomatic posts
Preceded by Tuaopepe Fili Wendt	Samoan Ambassador to the United States; 1993–2003	Succeeded by Ali'ioaiga Feturi Elisaia
Preceded by Tuaopepe Fili Wendt	Samoan Ambassador to the United Nations; 1993–2003	Succeeded by Ali'ioaiga Feturi Elisaia
Preceded by Feleti Teo; Acting	Secretary General of the Pacific Islands Forum; 2008–2014	Succeeded by Meg Taylor
