= List of high commissioners of Australia to Tonga =

Australian High Commissioner to Tonga

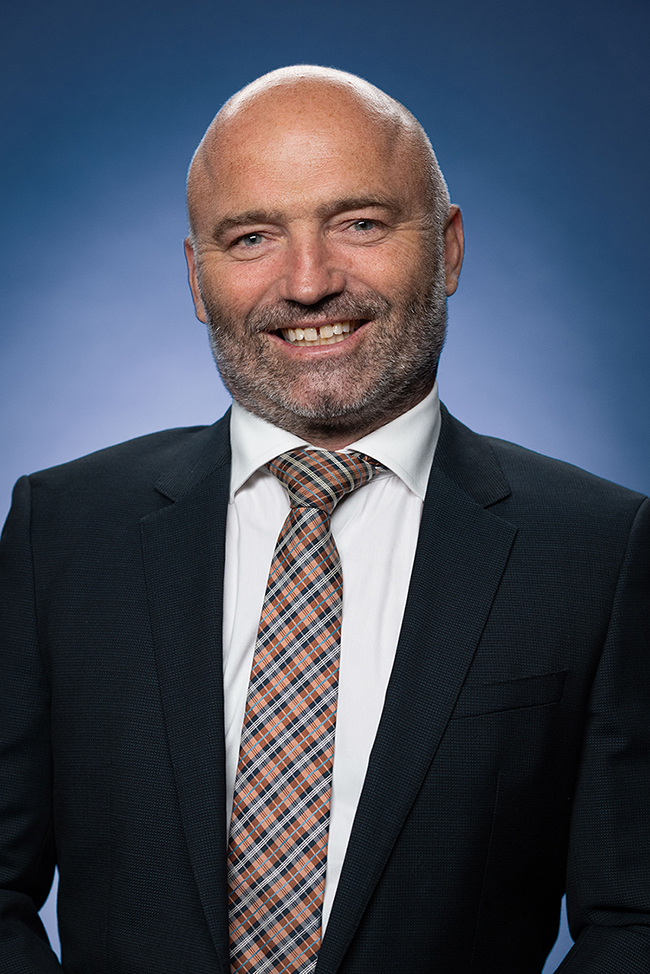
- Incumbent; Brek Batley since 23 April 2024
- Department of Foreign Affairs and Trade
- Style: His Excellency
- Reports to: Minister of Foreign Affairs
- Seat: Nukuʻalofa
- Nominator: Prime Minister of Australia
- Appointer: Governor General of Australia
- Inaugural holder: R. N. Birch (Non-resident High Commissioner, located in Suva, Fiji)
- Formation: 1970

The Australian high commissioner to Tonga is an officer of the Australian Department of Foreign Affairs and Trade and the head of the high commission of the Commonwealth of Australia in the Kingdom of Tonga. The position has the rank and status of an ambassador extraordinary and plenipotentiary and the high commissioner resides in Nukuʻalofa. The high commissioner, since April 2024, is Brek Batley.

== List of high commissioners ==
#	Officeholder	Residency	Term start date	Term end date	Time in office	Notes
1	R. N. Birch	Suva, Fiji	1970	1970	0 years	
2	Rowen Osborn	Suva, Fiji	1970	1973	2–3 years	
3	H. W. Bullock	Suva, Fiji	1973	1976	2–3 years	
4	Gordon Upton	Suva, Fiji	1976	1979	2–3 years	
5	Maris King	Nukuʻalofa	1980	1984	3–4 years	
6	Brian Smith	Nukuʻalofa	1984	1986	1–2 years	
7	Rodney Hills	Nukuʻalofa	1987	1990	2–3 years	
8	Howard Craig Brown	Nukuʻalofa	1990	1992	1–2 years	
9	Jennifer E. Rawson	Nukuʻalofa	1993	1995	1–2 years	
10	Andrew Mullin	Nukuʻalofa	1995	1999	3–4 years	
11	Angus Macdonald	Nukuʻalofa	1999	2003	3–4 years	
12	Colin Hill	Nukuʻalofa	2003	2006	2–3 years	
13	Bruce Hunt	Nukuʻalofa	2006	2011	4–5 years	
14	Thomas Roth	Nukuʻalofa	2011	2013	1–2 years	
15	Brett Aldam	Nukuʻalofa	2013	2016	2–3 years	
16	Andrew Ford	Nukuʻalofa	2016	2019	2–3 years	
17	Adrian Morrison	Nukuʻalofa	2019	2021	1–2 years	
18	Rachael Moore	Nukuʻalofa	2021	2024	2–3 years	
19	Brek Batley	Nukuʻalofa	23 April 2024	incumbent	2 years, 137 days	
