= Australia–Nepal relations =

- Australia: Nepal

Australia–Nepal relations refers to foreign relations between Australia and Nepal. Australia has an embassy in Kathmandu, and Nepal has an embassy in Canberra.

Australia–Nepal relations were officially established on 15 February 1960.
