= List of high commissioners of Australia to Nauru =

High Commissioner of Australia to Nauru

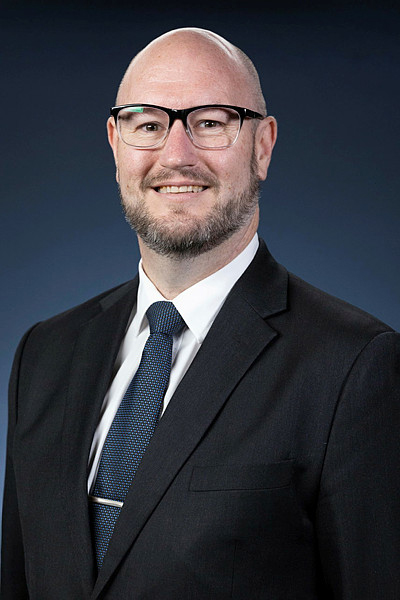
- Incumbent; Lisa White since July 2026
- Department of Foreign Affairs and Trade
- Style: Her Excellency
- Reports to: Minister for Foreign Affairs
- Residence: Aiwo District
- Nominator: Prime Minister of Australia
- Appointer: Governor General of Australia
- Inaugural holder: James Jackson (Representative)
- Formation: 26 August 1968
- Website: Australian High Commission, Republic of Nauru

The high commissioner of Australia to Nauru is an officer of the Australian Department of Foreign Affairs and Trade and the head of the High Commission of the Commonwealth of Australia in Nauru. The position has the rank and status of an ambassador extraordinary and plenipotentiary and is currently by Matthew Barclay since January 2025. Australia is one of only two countries to have a resident diplomatic mission in Nauru, the other being the embassy of Taiwan.

== Posting history ==
With the end of the Australian trusteeship administration and the formal independence of Nauru on 31 January 1968, the Australian Government appointed a Representative to the small island nation. With the establishment of a resident Australian High Commission on Nauru's admission to the Commonwealth of Nations in 1972, the position also had responsibility as the Commissioner for the Gilbert and Ellice Islands (1972–1976) and the Gilbert Islands (1976–1979), and then as the non-resident accredited high commissioner to Kiribati from 1979. In 1981, The Australian Government announced that it would open a resident High Commission in Kiribati, which was achieved in August 1982.

In January 1975, Alan Fogg was appointed Commissioner in Nauru, and also as non-resident commissioner to the Solomon Islands. With the independence of the Solomon Islands in 1978, the resident Australian High Commission was established on 7 July 1978. In December 1981, career diplomat Rodney Hodgson was announced as the next high commissioner to Nauru. However a few weeks later he was killed in a car accident, before he could take up his appointment.

When the new Commonwealth government of Prime Minister John Howard cut the budget of the Department of Foreign Affairs and Trade in 1996–97, forcing the closure of the High Commission in Nauru, in July 1997, accreditation for Nauru was transferred to the high commission in Suva, Fiji. From 1997 to 2009, the position of high commissioner was held by the high commissioner resident in Fiji. A Consulate-General in Nauru was opened in 2002, which was subsequently upgraded to a High Commission on 4 August 2009.

== Heads of mission ==
#	Officeholder	Title	Other offices	Residency	Term start date	Term end date	Time in office	Notes
1	James Jackson	Representative	n/a	Aiwo District	26 August 1968	10 September 1970	2 years, 15 days	
2	Richard Gate	Representative	n/a	Aiwo District	10 September 1970	6 September 1972	1 year, 362 days	
−	K. R. Fraser (Acting)	Representative	n/a	Aiwo District	6 September 1972	November 1972	1 month	
3	Leslie Sellars	High Commissioner	^{A}	Aiwo District	November 1972	December 1974	2 years, 1 month	
4	Alan Fogg	High Commissioner	^{A}^{B}	Aiwo District	January 1975	May 1977	2 years, 4 months	
5	Maris King	High Commissioner	^{A}^{B}	Aiwo District	May 1977	July 1979	2 years, 2 months	
6	Oliver Cordell	High Commissioner	^{A}	Aiwo District	July 1979	September 1982	3 years, 2 months	
7	Ross Smith	High Commissioner	n/a	Aiwo District	September 1982	July 1984	1 year, 10 months	
−	David Wadham (Acting)	High Commissioner	n/a	Aiwo District	July 1984	September 1985	1 year, 2 months	
8	John Powys	High Commissioner	n/a	Aiwo District	January 1986	January 1988	2 years	
9	Beris Gwynne	High Commissioner	n/a	Aiwo District	January 1988	January 1990	2 years	
10	Barry Wyborn	High Commissioner	n/a	Aiwo District	January 1990	February 1992	2 years, 1 month	
11	Denis Fitzgerald	High Commissioner	n/a	Aiwo District	February 1992	March 1995	3 years, 1 month	
12	Tom Sinkovits	High Commissioner	n/a	Aiwo District	March 1995	18 July 1997	2 years, 4 months	
13	Greg Urwin	High Commissioner	n/a	Suva, Fiji	18 July 1997	July 1999	1 year, 11 months	
14	Susan Boyd	High Commissioner	n/a	Suva, Fiji	July 1999	July 2003	4 years	
15	Jennifer Rawson	High Commissioner	n/a	Suva, Fiji	July 2003	January 2007	3 years, 6 months	
16	James Batley	High Commissioner	n/a	Suva, Fiji	January 2007	2 August 2009	2 years, 7 months	
17	George Fraser	High Commissioner	^{C}	Aiwo District	2 August 2009	November 2010	1 year, 2 months	
18	Bruce Cowled	High Commissioner	n/a	Aiwo District	November 2010	February 2014	3 years, 3 months	
19	Martin Quinn	High Commissioner	n/a	Aiwo District	February 2014	December 2015	1 year, 10 months	
20	John Donnelly	High Commissioner	n/a	Aiwo District	December 2015	December 2017	2 years	
21	Angela Tierney	High Commissioner	n/a	Aiwo District	December 2017	May 2021	3 years, 5 months	
−	Andrew Hodges (Acting)	High Commissioner	n/a	Aiwo District	May 2021	September 2021	4 months	
22	Helen Cheney	High Commissioner	n/a	Aiwo District	September 2021	January 2024	5 years, 1 month	
23	Sara Moriarty	High Commissioner	n/a	Aiwo District	December 2023	January 2025	1 year, 1 month	
24	Matthew Barclay	High Commissioner	n/a	Aiwo District	January 2025	July 2026	1 year, 9 months	
25	Lisa White	High Commissioner			July 2026	Incumbent		

=== Notes ===
^A Also non-resident Commissioner to the Gilbert and Ellice Islands (1972–1976), Commissioner to the Gilbert Islands (1976–1979), and as High Commissioner to Kiribati (1979–1982).
^B Also non-resident Commissioner to the Solomon Islands, 1975–1978.
^C Prior to appointment as High Commissioner, served as resident Special Representative and Consul-General from 11 October 2005 until 2 August 2009.
