= Gordon Upton =

Australian public servant and diplomat

Gordon Upton AO
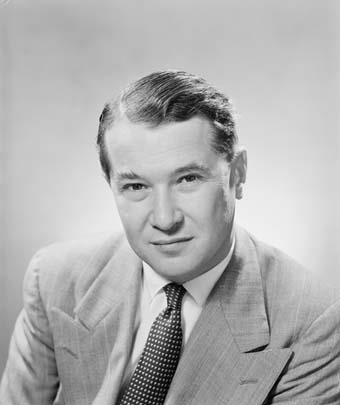

10th Ambassador of Australia to the United States (Chargé d'affaires)
- In office 27 December 1975 – 8 March 1976
- Preceded by: Patrick Shaw (Ambassador to the United States of America)
- Succeeded by: Nick Parkinson (Ambassador to the United States of America)

Personal details
- Born: Gordon Noel Upton; 24 December 1920 Sydney, New South Wales
- Died: 23 February 2010 (aged 89)
- Resting place: Woden Cemetery, Canberra
- Spouse: Elizabeth Jocelyn Easton
- Education: University of Sydney (BA)
- Occupation: Diplomat, public servant

Gordon Noel Upton AO (24 December 1920 – 23 February 2010) was an Australian public servant and diplomat. He served as Australian High Commissioner to Ceylon (1965–70), Fiji (1976–1979) and India (1979–1984).

While Upton was posted to India, a confidential report that he had authored in October 1980 was leaked to a journalist for The Age, that included criticism of the then Indian Prime Minister Indira Gandhi. The report was confirmed genuine and some members of the Indian parliament called for Upton's expulsion, but the Australian Government's apology satisfied the Indian Government and Upton was allowed to stay.

Upton was made an Officer of the Order of Australia in 1982 in recognition of his services as a diplomat.

== Life and career ==
Upton was born in Sydney, New South Wales, in 1920. He was educated at Canterbury Boys' High School, before matriculating to the University of Sydney where he gained a Bachelor of Arts in 1940.

Upton served in the Royal Australian Air Force during World War II, as a flight lieutenant. In 1946, Upton joined the Commonwealth Public Service in the Department of External Affairs.

While he was Australian embassy counsellor in Jakarta, Upton's dog Susa suffered from rabies and died.

Then Prime Minister Robert Menzies announced Upton's appointment as High Commissioner to Ceylon in December 1965. After a time at the Joint Intelligence Organisation in the early 1970s, Upton returned to the foreign affairs department and was posted to London as Minister in 1973.

In 1975, when Sir Patrick Shaw died in office as Australian Ambassador to the United States, Upton was appointed Chargé d'Affaires ad interim.

In May 1976, Upton was appointed Australian High Commissioner to Fiji.

In December 1979, Andrew Peacock, then foreign affairs minister, announced Upton's appointment as High Commissioner to India. Whilst he was living in New Delhi, details of a confidential report that Upton sent to the Department of Foreign Affairs in October 1980 was published in The Age. The published report included critical remarks about the then Indian Prime Minister, Indira Gandhi, who had been in office for less than a year at the time. After the leak, five members of the Indian Parliament reportedly demanded that Upton be recalled, but the statement was not made on behalf of the Indian Government and Upton retained his position.

Upton, in his position as High Commissioner to India in 1983, presented Mother Teresa with an Order of Australia, for her work with the poor. She was the seventh non-Australian to be honoured with the award.

Upton died on 23 February 2010 and was buried in Woden Cemetery.

== Awards ==
In 1982, Upton was made an Officer of the Order of Australia for his public service as a diplomatic representative.

Diplomatic posts
Preceded by Bertram Ballard	Australian High Commissioner to Ceylon; 1965–1970	Succeeded by H.D. White
Preceded by Patrick Shaw as Ambassador	Australian Chargé d'Affaires to the United States; 1975–1976	Succeeded by Nick Parkinson as Ambassador
Preceded by H.W. Bullock	Australian High Commissioner to Fiji; Australian High Commissioner to Samoa; 1976–1979	Succeeded by Raymond Greet
Preceded by H.W. Bullock	Australian High Commissioner to Tonga; 1976–1979	Succeeded by Maris King
Preceded by Peter Curtis	Australian High Commissioner to India; Australian Ambassador to Nepal; 1979–1984	Succeeded by Graham Feakes
