= Alan Fogg =

Australian public servant and diplomat (1924–2010)

Alan Fogg MBE
- Born: Alan Lindsay Fogg; 15 December 1924; Queensland, Australia
- Died: 1 April 2010 (aged 85); Canberra
- Occupations: Public servant, diplomat
- Children: 2

Alan Lindsay Fogg MBE (1924–2010) was an Australian public servant and diplomat.

Diplomatic posts
Preceded by Leslie Sellars	Australian High Commissioner to Nauru; Australian Commissioner to the Gilbert Islands; 1975–1977	Succeeded by Maris King
Preceded by Allan Loomes	Australian Ambassador to Peru; 1979–1980	Succeeded by Jim Ferguson
Preceded by Allan Loomes	Australian Ambassador to Venezuela; 1979	Succeeded by Alan Brown
