= List of ambassadors of Australia to Venezuela =

Ambassador of Australia to Venezuela
- Incumbent; Todd Mercer (resident in Santiago) since February 2020
- Department of Foreign Affairs and Trade
- Style: His Excellency
- Reports to: Minister for Foreign Affairs
- Residence: Santiago, Chile
- Nominator: Prime Minister of Australia
- Appointer: Governor General of Australia
- Inaugural holder: Frederick Homer (resident in Brasília)
- Formation: 1973

The Ambassador of Australia to Venezuela is an officer of the Australian Department of Foreign Affairs and Trade and the head of the Embassy of the Commonwealth of Australia to the Bolivarian Republic of Venezuela. The ambassador resides in Santiago, Chile. The current ambassador, since February 2020, is Todd Mercer.

The Australian Government established an embassy in Caracas in 1979 and appointed its first resident ambassador, A. D. Brown. Previously, responsibility for Australian diplomatic representation in Venezuela was held in Brazil (1973–1974) and then Peru (1974–1979). The Australian Embassy in Caracas was closed in 2002.

== List of ambassadors ==
Ordinal	Officeholder	Residency	Term start date	Term end date	Time in office	Notes
1	Frederick Homer	Brasília, Brazil	1973	1974	0–1 years	
2	Allan Loomes	Lima, Peru	1974	1978	3–4 years	
3	Alan Fogg	Lima, Peru	1979	1979	0 years	
4	Alan Brown	Caracas, Venezuela	1979	1980	0–1 years	
5	Peter Barbour	Caracas, Venezuela	1981	1984	2–3 years	
6	Richard Starr	Caracas, Venezuela	1985	1986	0–1 years	
7	Anthony Dingle	Caracas, Venezuela	1987	1991	3–4 years	
8	Dominique De Stoop	Caracas, Venezuela	1991	1996	4–5 years	
9	Roger Frankel	Caracas, Venezuela	1996	2000	3–4 years	
10	John Woods	Caracas, Venezuela	2000	2002	1–2 years	
11	Virginia Greville	Santiago, Chile	2009	2012	2–3 years	
12	Tim Kane	Santiago, Chile	2012	2016	3–4 years	
13	Robert Fergusson	Santiago, Chile	January 2017	2020	2–3 years	
14	Todd Mercer	Santiago, Chile	February 2020	incumbent	6 years, 7 months	
