= Biketawa =

Islet in the Republic of Kiribati

Coordinates: 1°26′10″N 173°04′21″E

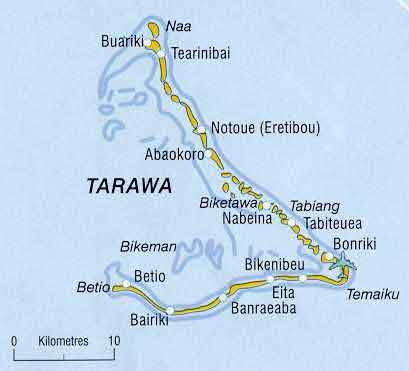
Map of the Tarawa atoll showing the location of Biketawa.

Biketawa is one of the twenty-four small islets which comprise the atoll of Tarawa in the Republic of Kiribati. The capital of Kiribati, South Tarawa, is located on Tarawa.

The 2000 Biketawa Declaration on Pacific regional security takes its name from Biketawa.
