= Biketawa Declaration =

The Biketawa Declaration (2000) is a declaration agreed to by all the leaders of the Pacific Islands Forum constituting a framework for coordinating response to regional crises. The declaration takes its name from the Kiribati islet of Biketawa, where the Forum Leaders met in a retreat to discuss, agree and adopt measures for collective security.

The declaration was agreed to at the 31st Summit of Pacific Islands Forum Leaders, held at Kiribati in October 2000 in the regional context of the 2000 Fijian coup d'état and ethnic tensions in the Solomon Islands. It commits Forum members to eight core values, including good governance, liberty of the individual, democratic processes and indigenous rights and cultural values, traditions and customs, and recognising the importance and urgency of equitable economic, social and cultural development to satisfy the basic needs and aspirations of the peoples of the Forum. Where these values are breached, the Forum Secretary-General and members will develop a response, which may include mediation, institutional support, or targeted measures (sanctions). Since its adoption it has been invoked a number of times, leading to regional peacekeeping and stabilization operations in:

- Solomon Islands (Regional Assistance Mission to Solomon Islands, 2003 – 2017)
- Nauru (Pacific Regional Assistance to Nauru, 2004–2009)
- Tonga (2006 Nukuʻalofa riots, 2006)
- Nauru (election observation mission for the 2019 Nauruan parliamentary election)

The Declaration also provided the basis for the Forum's 2009 decision to suspend Fiji after it had failed to hold elections in the wake of the 2006 Fijian coup d'état. The suspension was lifted in 2014, after the military regime held elections.

Forum members and NGOs have unsuccessfully sought to invoke the declaration over torture in Fiji, the 2011 Fiji-Tonga territorial dispute, the Nauru government's 2014 crackdown on opposition, and the 2016 Nauruan parliamentary election.

The Declaration was most recently invoked to respond collectively to the COVID-19 pandemic. In July 2021 Forum Secretary-General Henry Puna reminded Samoa's caretaker government of the Declaration in a statement on the 2021 Samoan constitutional crisis.

== Biketawa Plus ==
In 2017 the Forum began to consider expanding the Biketawa Declaration to cover other security threats such as natural disasters. Talks on the proposed "Biketawa plus" continued through 2018, resulting in the Boe Declaration of 2018. This expanded the Bitekawa Declaration to include issues of human security, environmental security, transnational crime, and cybersecurity.

== Boe Declaration (2018) ==
The Boe Declaration of Regional Security is a declaration agreed to by all the leaders of the Pacific Islands Forum on 5 September 2018 at a meeting on Nauru, which declaration is a framework for coordinating response to regional crises, and sets out an expanded concept of security. The Boe Declaration extended the Biketawa Declaration (2000) to include issues of human security, environmental security, transnational crime, and cybersecurity.

The first 4 of the 10 sections of the Boe Declaration state:

- We reaffirm that climate change remains the single greatest threat to the livelihoods, security and wellbeing of the peoples of the Pacific and our commitment to progress the implementation of the Paris Agreement;
- We recognise an increasingly complex regional security environment driven by multifaceted security challenges, and a dynamic geopolitical environment leading to an increasingly crowded and complex region;
- We affirm our stewardship of the Blue Pacific and aspire to strengthen and enhance our capacity to pursue our collective security interests given our responsibility to sustain our Pacific peoples and our resources;
- We respect and assert the sovereign right of every Member to conduct its national affairs free of external interference and coercion;

The Boe Declaration is an update on the mechanism used to establish the Regional Assistance Mission to Solomon Islands (RAMSI) from 2003 to 2017, which was a request for international aid by the government of the Solomon Islands to manage civil unrest in that country.

The Biketawa Declaration on collective security committed Pacific Islands Forum members to eight values, including good governance, liberty of the individual, democratic processes, indigenous rights and cultural values, traditions and customs, and recognising the importance and urgency of equitable economic, social and cultural development to satisfy the basic needs and aspirations of the peoples of the Forum.

The expanded concept of security set out in the Boe Declaration has been applied in Falepili Union between Tuvalu and Australia (2023).
