= Crispin Conroy =

Australian diplomat and ICC Permanent Observer (born 1963)

Permanent Observer of the International Chamber of Commerce
- Incumbent
- Assumed office January 2019

Australian Ambassador to Nepal
- In office 1999–2002
- Preceded by: Brendan Doran
- Succeeded by: Keith Gardner

Australian Ambassador to Chile
- In office 2005–2009
- Preceded by: Elizabeth Schick
- Succeeded by: Virginia Greville

Personal details
- Born: 8 May 1963 (age 63) Cambridge, United Kingdom
- Children: 3
- Education: Australian National University
- Occupation: Diplomat

Crispin Conroy (born 8 May 1963) is an Australian diplomat.

He currently serves as the Permanent Observer of the International Chamber of Commerce to the United Nations Office at Geneva, since January 2019. He previously served as a career diplomat with the Australian Government for over 25 years. He first worked for the Department of Foreign Affairs and Trade, and then for the Australian Trade and Investment Commission.

== Early life ==
Conroy was born in Cambridge, United Kingdom in 1963.

He holds a Bachelor of Arts in French language and civilization (Hons) from the Australian National University. He has a Bachelor of Law (Hons) from the same university, which he received in 1988.

== Career ==
=== Australian diplomatic appointments ===
From 1990 to 1993, Conroy was Third and Second Secretary at the Australian embassy in Madrid, Spain. He returned to Canberra from 1994 to 1995, continuing work with the Department of Foreign Affairs and Trade. He was named First Secretary at the Australian Permanent Mission to the United Nations in Geneva between 1995 and 1998 and was Deputy Legal Adviser and Director of the International Law Section afterwards until 1999.

Conroy was the Australian Ambassador to the Kingdom of Nepal from December 1999 to December 2002. From October 2003 until October 2005, he was the Deputy Head of Mission in Port Moresby.

He served as Australian Ambassador to Chile between December 2005 and May 2009. Conroy's posting included concurrent accreditation to Peru, Colombia, Ecuador and Bolivia. Conroy was Ambassador to Chile between 2005 and 2009, stationed in Santiago, Chile. As ambassador, he helped secure funding for children's sport and leisure facilities in the poor region of Renca, in cooperation with World Vision. Conroy acknowledged that usually funding of projects by Australia is not the norm.

Following his term in Chile, Conroy was appointed Senior Trade Commissioner for Latin America, based in Chile but covering the whole region. He served in this capacity from June 2009 to June 2012. Conroy worked alongside Minister of Foreign Affairs Stephen Smith to develop a commercial engagement strategy for Australia in Latin America.

He was then appointed as Australia's Consul-General to Colombia, and asked by Minister of Foreign Affairs Julie Bishop to open Australia's first diplomatic and trade presence in the country. At the same time, Conroy covered Chile, Colombia, and Argentina as Senior Trade Commissioner. Conroy served as Consul General to Colombia from July 2012 until July 2016.

In November 2016, Conroy was appointed as the Australian Senior Trade and Investment Commissioner to Italy, and Australian Consul-General in Milan. As part of this posting, Crispin worked to promote the Australian government's start up initiative in Italy.

=== United Nations diplomatic appointments ===
After over 25 years working for the Australian government, Conroy was appointed as the first Permanent Observer of the International Chamber of Commerce to the United Nations in Geneva. The International Chamber of Commerce received observer status to the United Nations on 21 December 2016 and assumed its position at the United Nations General Assembly on 1 January 2017.

== Personal life ==
Conroy is married and has three daughters.

Diplomatic posts
Preceded by Brendan Doran	Australian Ambassador to Nepal; 1999 – 2002	Succeeded by Keith Gardner
Preceded by Elizabeth Schick	Australian Ambassador to Chile; 2005 – 2009	Succeeded by Virginia Greville
New title	Australian Consul-General and Trade Commissioner in Bogota; 2012 – 2016	Succeeded by Saïd Metwalli
