= Jim Ferguson (diplomat) =

Australian diplomat (1940–2026)

- Born: James Alexander Ferguson; 29 November 1940; Sydney, Australia
- Died: 27 January 2026 (aged 85); Canberra, Australia
- Education: University of Sydney
- Occupations: Public servant, diplomat

James Alexander Ferguson (29 November 1940 – 27 January 2026) was an Australian diplomat, senior public servant and sport administrator. He was executive director of the Australian Sports Commission between 1990 and 2000.

== Background ==
Ferguson was born in Sydney on 29 November 1940. Before and whilst completing his studies at the University of Sydney, he did a variety of jobs including jackaroo, taxi driver and publisher's editor. His grandfather was Sir John Alexander Ferguson (1881–1969), a notable Australian judge and bibliographer. Sir John's collection of Australiana was given to the National Library of Australia and forms the basis of the Library's Australian collection.

Ferguson died in Canberra on 27 January 2026, at the age of 85.

== Australian public service ==
Ferguson worked for the Department of Foreign Affairs between 1966 and 1986. During this period, he was posted overseas several times and held the position of ambassador to Peru between 1981 and 1983. From 1986 to 1990, he was Head of the Tourism and Sport Division, Commonwealth Department of Arts, Sport, the Environment and Tourism. From 1990 to 2001, he was executive director of the Australian Sports Commission (ASC).

== Sport ==
While working in the Australian government Department of the Arts, Sport, the Environment, Tourism and Territories, he played a role in the establishment of the new Australian Sports Commission as the government authority responsible for all sports development in Australia. He became executive director of the Australian Sports Commission in 1990 replacing Ron Harvey. He took over the ASC at a time when it had just completed the merger between the ASC and the Australian Institute of Sport and the Senate Inquiry into Drugs in Sport. In 1993, Australia won the right to host the 2000 Sydney Olympics and Paralympics. This resulted in the Australian Government announcing the Olympic Athlete Program (OAP) in 1994. He was responsible for implementing this six-year program which lead to major changes in Australia's elite sport system. The OAP program resulted in Australia from progressing from 27 medals at the 1992 Barcelona Olympics to a record 58 medals and fourth place on the medal tally at the Sydney Olympics. He left the Australian Sports Commission at the end of 2000 and was replaced by Mark Peters. On his departure from the ASC, Peter Bartels, ASC chairman stated "Jim’s contribution to the development of sport in Australia is immeasurable. The level of excellence now reached and the international standing of Australian sport is the best testament to Jim’s time at the ASC". In December 2000, he was awarded the Australian Sports Medal for leadership of the Australian Sports Commission and Australian sport. In 2007, he published the book More than Sunshine & Vegemite : Success the Australian Way which documented the development of Australian sport for the period 1990 to 2000.

After leaving the Australian Sports Commission, he was President of the ACT Rugby Union and China Australia Sports Association. He was also a board member of the Australian Tourist Commission, Great Barrier Reef Marine Park Authority, World Youth Soccer Cup, World Masters Games. He was a member of the Migration Review Tribunal. In 2010, he became a board member of Boxing Australia, a position he held for 12 years until 2022 and was commissioned by Prime Minister Kevin Rudd to develop a plan to assist the Pacific Region through rugby union.

In 2026, he was inducted into the ACT Sport Hall of Fame.

Diplomatic posts
Preceded by Alan Fogg	Australian Ambassador to Peru; 1981–1983	Succeeded by G.S.F. Harding
