= Pacific Plan =

The Pacific Plan, endorsed by Forum Leaders at the Pacific Islands Forum meeting in Port Moresby in 2006, is a document designed to strengthen Pacific regional integration and cooperation. Its four key pillars are designed for development progress: economic growth, sustainable development, good governance, and security. As a 'living document', it states that the Pacific, as a region, must work to address these challenges to raise living standards, increase access to opportunity and stimulate pro-poor growth for its peoples.

The plan was reviewed in 2013.
