= Pacific Islands Forum =

Intergovernmental organisation of island nations in the Pacific Ocean

- Logo

- Membership (dark blue) of the Pacific Islands Forum.
- Seat of Secretariat: Suva, Fiji
- Membership: 18 nations: Australia; Cook Islands; Fiji; French Polynesia (France); Kiribati; Marshall Islands; Federated States of Micronesia; Nauru; New Caledonia (France); New Zealand; Niue; Palau; Papua New Guinea; Samoa; Solomon Islands; Tonga; Tuvalu; Vanuatu

Leaders
  - Forum Chair: Solomon Islands
  - Secretary General: Baron Waqa

Establishment
  - as South Pacific Forum: 1971
  - renamed Pacific Islands Forum: 2000

Area
  - Total: 8,509,959 km^{2} (3,285,714 sq mi)

Population
  - 2020 estimate: 42.837 million
  - Density: 4/km^{2} (10.4/sq mi)
- GDP (nominal): 2020 estimate
  - Total: USD 1.684 trillion^{a}
  - Per capita: USD 13,690
- HDI (2020): ▲0.714^{a} high (108th^{a})
- Website www.forumsec.org
- 1. If the Forum is considered a single state.

The Pacific Islands Forum (PIF; French: Forum des îles du Pacifique; Fijian: Bose ni Yatu Pasifika; Māori: Te Huinga Moutere o Te Moananui-a-Kiwa; Samoan: Fono a Atumotu o le Pasefika; Tahitian: Te mau motu no Patitifa; Tok Pisin: Pasifik Ailan Forum; Tongan: Fakataha 'a e Ngaahi 'Otu Motu Pasifiki) is an inter-governmental organization that promotes political and economic cooperation among countries and territories of Oceania.

The Forum comprises 18 members, including Pacific island countries and territories, Australia, and New Zealand. Australia and New Zealand are the Forum's two largest economies and major providers of development assistance to Pacific island countries. The Forum coordinates regional cooperation and policy development on issues including economic development, trade, security, and climate change.

The Forum was founded in Wellington, New Zealand, in 1971 as the South Pacific Forum (SPF) by seven founding members: Australia, Cook Islands, Fiji, Nauru, New Zealand, Tonga, and Western Samoa (now Samoa). In 2000, it adopted its present name to include expanding membership across the northern and southern Pacific.

The Forum has also played a role in regional security. Under the Biketawa Declaration of 2000, the Forum endorsed the Regional Assistance Mission to Solomon Islands, a multinational security and stabilization mission that operated from 2003 to 2017. In 2022, Forum leaders adopted the 2050 Strategy for the Blue Pacific Continent to establish a long-term framework for regional cooperation on political, economic, environmental, and security issues.

== History ==
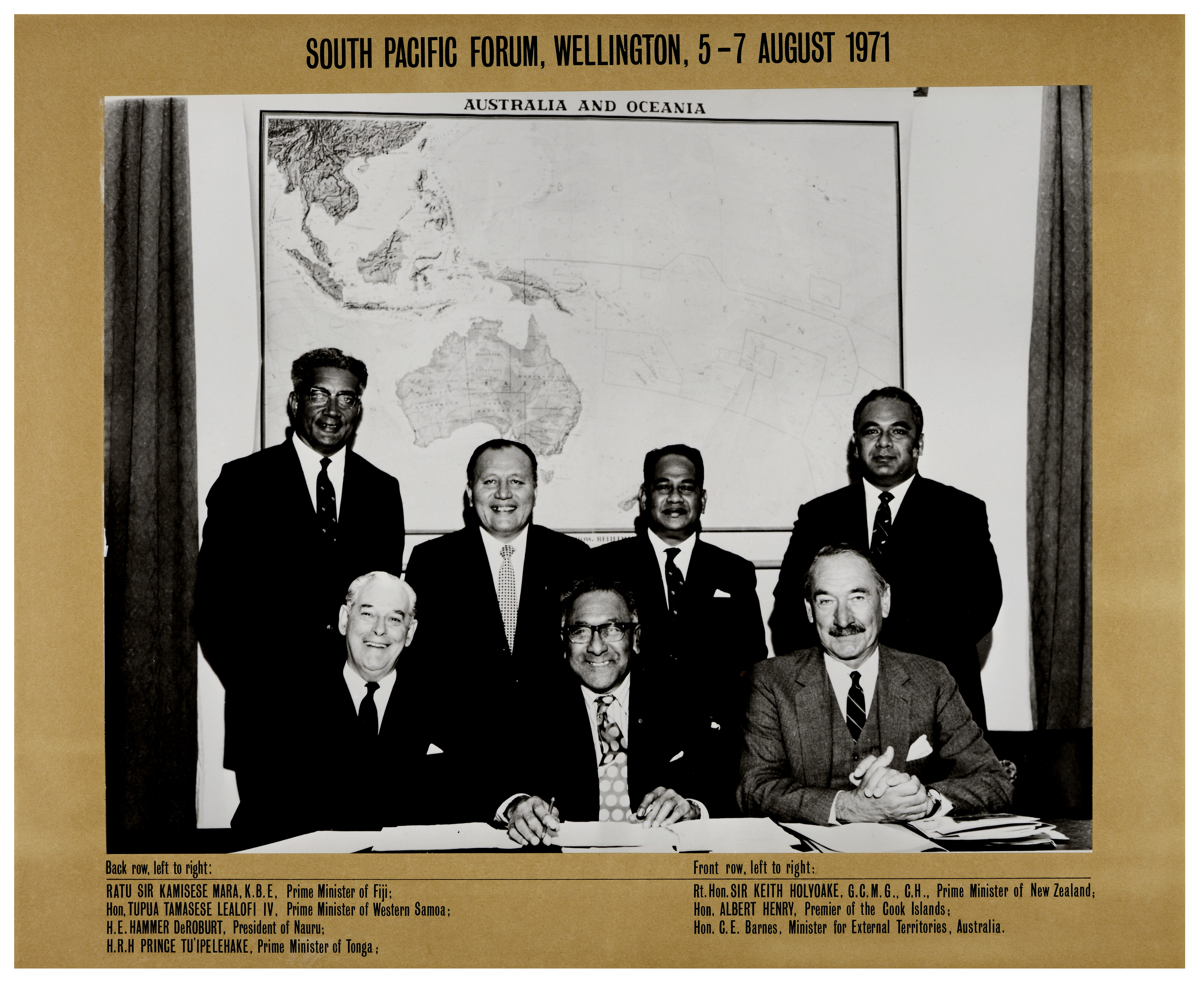
South Pacific Forum, 5 August 1971, Wellington

=== Origins and establishment ===
The establishment of the South Pacific Forum in 1971 followed growing dissatisfaction among Pacific island countries with the structure and limitations of the South Pacific Commission (SPC). The SPC focused on economic and social development but excluded political matters, including decolonization and nuclear testing.

During the 1960s, the emergence of independent and self-governing Pacific island countries increased demands for participation in regional decision-making and opportunities to discuss political issues outside the SPC. Cook Islands Premier Albert Henry publicly called for a separate political forum in 1970.

New Zealand hosted the inaugural meeting of the South Pacific Forum in Wellington from August 5 to 7, 1971. The meeting was attended by the president of Nauru; the prime ministers of Western Samoa, Tonga, Fiji, and New Zealand; the premier of the Cook Islands; and Australia's minister for external territories. The informal discussions addressed trade, shipping, tourism, education, and French nuclear testing in the Pacific. Participants expressed support for continuing the meetings annually.

At its 30th meeting in Koror, Palau, in October 1999, the South Pacific Forum agreed to change its name to the Pacific Islands Forum to account for membership in both the northern and southern Pacific. The change took effect in 2000.

=== Suspension of Fiji ===
In August 2008, the Forum considered suspending Fiji after its military-led interim government, established following the 2006 military coup, indicated that it would not uphold its commitment to hold elections by March 2009. At a special meeting in January 2009, Forum leaders required the interim government to announce an election date by 1 May and hold elections by the end of the year. Interim prime minister Frank Bainimarama rejected the deadline, and the Forum suspended his government's participation on 2 May 2009.

Forum Chair Toke Talagi cited deteriorating political, legal, and human rights conditions in Fiji as an additional justification for the suspension, while clarifying that Fiji remained a Forum member. The decision marked the first suspension in the Forum's history. Following the Fijian general election in September 2014, the Forum lifted the suspension on 22 October 2014.

=== Micronesian withdrawal ===
Following the election of Henry Puna as Secretary-General in February 2021 during a virtual meeting, Palau threatened to leave the Forum, claiming that a "gentlemen's agreement" to rotate the position between Melanesia, Micronesia, and Polynesia, had been violated. Puna had won a ballot by one vote (9–8) against the Marshall Island's Gerald Zackios, who was supported by five nations from Micronesia. On 4 February, Palau formally terminated its participation in the forum, citing that the "process regarding the appointment of the Secretary General has clearly indicated to the Republic of Palau that unity, regionalism and the Pacific Way no longer guide the Forum", and closed its embassy in Fiji. On 6 February, the Forum's chair responded to the allegations, stating that there was a consensus decisions following an agreed process and that "we have upheld our principles and values as characterised through the Pacific way". On 8 February the Palau National Congress formally passed a joint resolution, supporting the decision made by President Surangel Whipps Jr. to leave the Forum. Whipps has stated Puna has to step down for Palau to rejoin the Forum.

After Palau's decision to leave the Forum, several other participant countries have indicated their intention to review their membership. In general, the countries of Micronesia, with smaller populations and economies, have complained of being sidelined by larger countries, including Australia, Fiji, New Zealand, and Papua New Guinea. There had only ever been one Micronesian Secretary-General of the PIF. The day after Palau's withdrawal, MPs in the Marshall Islands, who had previously supported Zackios, called for the government to review its participation in the Forum, but opposed withdrawal. The Federated States of Micronesia and Nauru have openly questioned whether they will remain members. Nauru President Lionel Aingimea has signalled his intention to pull out, stating that "If this is the way Micronesia is treated, then it is better off withdrawing from the Forum". Four members of the Micronesian bloc – the Federated States of Micronesia, Kiribati, the Marshall Islands, and Nauru – decided to hold a virtual meeting to discuss whether to exit the Forum. Australia has attempted to convince the four Pacific Island nations not to pull out. While it has indicated a desire to continue to work with the Micronesian group if it chose to pull out of the Forum, it emphasised the need for Pacific unity.

On 9 February 2021, the remaining Micronesian states – the Federated States of Micronesia, Kiribati, the Marshall Islands, and Nauru – decided to leave the Forum. Micronesian leaders released a statement to "collectively express their great disappointment with the Pacific Islands Forum Secretary General appointment process", with each state jointly agreeing to formally initiate the process of withdrawal from the Forum. Their departure reduces the Forum to 12 members, all of them in the South Pacific. It may take up to a year for the countries to formally leave the regional body. Australian Foreign Minister Marise Payne has stated that "we will continue to work very closely with the members of the Pacific Forum".

In February 2022, it was announced that the five Micronesian countries would pause the process of their departure. The President of the Federated States of Micronesia, David Panuelo, said that he had been told that Henry Puna would step down as Secretary-General, and that other reforms would occur. The Pacific Islands Forum secretariat did not officially confirm Puna's departure, saying only that talks were ongoing. President Whipps of Palau said that the pause gave the Forum one last chance to do the right thing. In April, it was reported that the President of the Marshall Islands, David Kabua, was urging other Micronesian leaders to agree to several proposed reforms but to withdraw their demand for Puna to step down. In June 2022, Forum leaders reached an agreement which would see Puna remain in office, and be replaced by a Micronesian candidate when his term ended. The rotation of the Secretary-General between Micronesia, Melanesia and Polynesia would be made a permanent feature of the Forum, and two deputy secretary-general positions would be created for the other sub-regions. Kiribati did not agree to the arrangement, and on 9 July 2022 withdrew from the Forum with immediate effect. Kiribati rejoined the Forum on 24 February 2023 following an official apology by Forum chair Sitiveni Rabuka.

== Membership ==
In September 2011, the U.S. territories of American Samoa, Guam, and the Northern Mariana Islands were granted observer status in the Pacific Islands Forum, while in September 2016 the French territories of French Polynesia and New Caledonia were granted full membership. Easter Island (administered by Chile) and Hawaii (an oceanic state of the U.S.) have both considered gaining representation. Kiribati withdrew from the Forum in 2022. The government of Kiribati changed its mind the next year in 2023 and decided to rejoin the forum, making its plans clear by a meeting of President of Kiribati Taneti Mamau with Prime Minister of Fiji Sitiveni Rabuka where Mamau told Rabuka about Kiribati's plan. Rabuka confirmed to the media that such a meeting did take place and stated that Kiribati had reconciled with the Pacific Islands Forum and would rejoin the Forum soon. In August 2024, American Samoa and Guam were elevated to associate members.

In late August 2024, the Solomon Islands tabled a motion challenging Taiwan's participation in the Forum as a partner country. According to The Australian newspaper, China had issued a directive to prevent Taiwan from participating in the 2025 Forum meeting, scheduled to be held in Solomon Islands. In early September 2024, China's Ambassador to the Pacific Qian Bo successfully lobbied for the Forum to remove references to Taiwan in the final communique of the 2024 leaders' summit in Tonga that week.

On 20 October 2026, Israel was admitted to the Pacific Islands Forum as an external dialogue partner. Israel's admission to the Forum as an external dialogue partner was preceded by three Forum members–Papua New Guinea, Fiji and Naoero (Nauru)–announcing plans to open embassies in Jerusalem. As part of plans to expand its Pacific diplomatic outreach, Israel has also announced plans to establish an embassy in Fiji that would serve nine Pacific countries. Israel's accession drew a mixed response from New Zealand political parties and leaders. While New Zealand Prime Minister Christopher Luxon said that Israel's entry was a decision for the Forum and ACT party leader David Seymour welcomed Israel's membership as a "democratic country," the New Zealand Labour Party's foreign affairs spokesperson Vanushi Walters said that her party would have opposed Israel's admission due to an ICC arrest warrant for Israeli Prime Minister Benjamin Netanyahu. While Fijian Deputy Prime Minister and Tourism Minister Viliame Gavoka supported Israel's participation on the grounds that the Pacific's relationship with Israel was "biblical and ageless and real," the Pacific Conference of Churches and Pacific Elders' Voice objected to the participation agreement on grounds of Israel's violations of international law and United Nations resolutions.

Map indicating the members and associate members of the Pacific Islands Forum
Member nations
Australia (AU)	Cook Islands (CK)	Fiji (FJ)	French Polynesia (PF)
Kiribati (KI)	Marshall Islands (MH)	Micronesia (FM)	Nauru (NR)
New Caledonia (NC)	New Zealand (NZ)	Niue (NU)	Palau (PW)
Papua New Guinea (PG)	Samoa (WS)	Solomon Islands (SB)	Tonga (TO)
Tuvalu (TV)	Vanuatu (VU)		
Associate member	Observers		
American Samoa (AS)	Northern Mariana Islands (MP)	Timor-Leste (TL)	ACP Secretariat
Guam (GU)	Asian Development Bank	Commonwealth Secretariat	IOM
Tokelau (TK)	United Nations Secretariat	WCPFC	World Bank
Wallis and Futuna (WF)			
Dialogue partners
Canada	Chile	China (CN)	Cuba
European Union	France	Germany	India
Indonesia (ID)	Israel	Italy	Japan
Malaysia (MY)	Norway	Philippines (PH)	Singapore
South Korea	Spain	Thailand	Turkey
United Kingdom	United States (US)		
Development partner
Taiwan (TW)

Note that PN on the map is Pitcairn Islands, a British Overseas Territory.

== Statistics ==
Regions
Melanesia	Micronesia	Polynesia

Population and economic statistics of full and associate members
Member	Land area (km^{2})	Population (2023)	GDP (USD), 2026		Human Development Index (2023)	Net ODA received (% of GNI)	
Member	Land area (km^{2})	Population (2023)	total (millions)	Per capita	Human Development Index (2023)	Net ODA received (% of GNI)	
Member	American Samoa^{1}	200	43,914	658	11,200	—	—
Australia	7,741,220	26,451,124	2,060,651	73,361	0.958	—	
Cook Islands	236	14,222	401	29,800	—	—	
Fiji	18,274	924,145	15,944	17,074	0.731	14.9	
French Polynesia	4,167	281,118	6,007	23,300	—	—	
Guam^{1}	540	172,952	5,793	35,600	—	—	
Kiribati	811	132,530	503	3,833	0.644	18.7	
Marshall Islands	181	38,827	298	8,415	0.733	37.9	
Micronesia	702	112,630	465	4,913	0.615	29.2	
Nauru	21	11,875	154	12,596	0.703	14.4	
New Caledonia	18,575	289,870	8,469	34,600	—	—	
New Zealand	268,838	5,172,836	309,050	57,481	0.938	—	
Niue	260	1,817	19	11,100	—	—	
Palau	459	17,727	350	19,991	0.786	20.9	
Papua New Guinea	462,840	10,389,635	50,746	3,882	0.576	4.7	
Samoa	2,831	216,663	1,839	8,626	0.708	10.0	
Solomon Islands	28,896	800,005	2,265	2,786	0.584	16.5	
Tokelau^{1}	12	2,397	8	6,004	—	—	
Tonga	747	104,597	836	8,445	0.769	22.8	
Tuvalu	26	9,816	64	6,412	0.689	44.4	
Vanuatu	12,189	320,409	1,120	3,032	0.621	15.0	
Wallis and Futuna^{1}	142	11,370	212	18,360	—	—	
Total	8,547,034	45,520,479	2,465,852		0.704	20.783	

^{1} Associate member

== Secretaries General ==
The Secretary General of the Pacific Islands Forum Secretariat is appointed to a three-year term by the leaders of the member states. The Secretary General reports directly to the national leaders and the Forum Officials' Committee (FOC). The Secretary General also automatically serves as the permanent chairman of the Council of Regional Organisations in the Pacific (CROP).

#	Name	Country	Took office	Left office
Directors of the South Pacific Bureau for Economic Co-operation
1	Mahe Tupouniua	Tonga	November 1972	1980
2	Gabriel Gris	Papua New Guinea	1980	1982 (died in office)
	John Sheppard (acting)	Australia	1982	January 1983
3	Mahe Tupouniua	Tonga	January 1983	January 1986
4	Henry Naisali	Tuvalu	January 1986	September 1988
Secretary General of the Pacific Islands Forum
	Henry Naisali	Tuvalu	September 1988	January 1992
5	Ieremia Tabai	Kiribati	January 1992	January 1998
6	Noel Levi	Papua New Guinea	February 1998	16 May 2004
7	Greg Urwin	Australia	16 May 2004	2 May 2008 (resigned)
	Feleti Teo (acting)	Tuvalu	2 May 2008	13 October 2008
8	Tuiloma Neroni Slade	Samoa	13 October 2008	4 December 2014
9	Meg Taylor	Papua New Guinea	4 December 2014	4 February 2021
10	Henry Puna	Cook Islands	4 February 2021	23 May 2024
11	Baron Waqa	Nauru	3 June 2024	Incumbent

== Institutions and legal framework ==
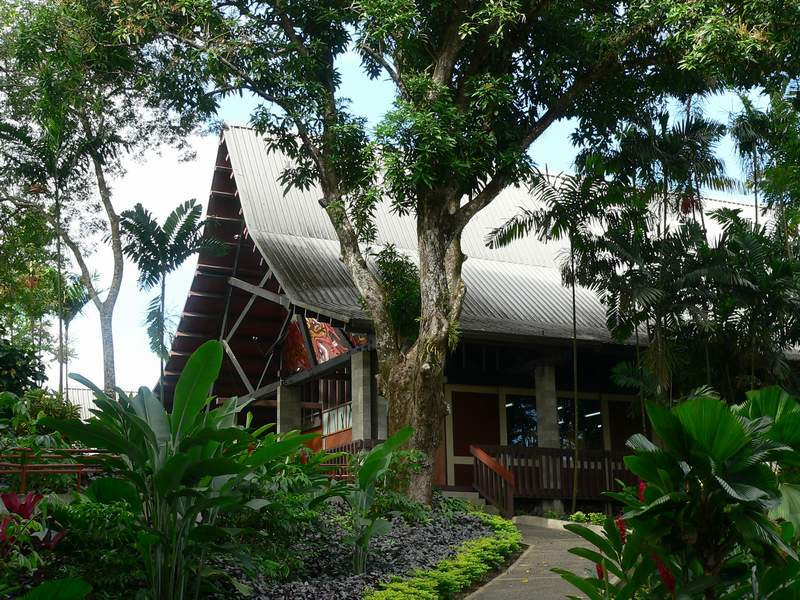
Library and archives building at the Secretariat complex in Suva, Fiji.

The Pacific Islands Forum Secretariat was established initially as a trade bureau in 1972 and later became the South Pacific Bureau for Economic Co-operation (SPEC). The name South Pacific Forum Secretariat was approved by member governments in 1988 and changed to Pacific Islands Forum Secretariat in 2000.

There are four divisions in the Pacific Islands Forum Secretariat, and each of these divisions has direct responsibility for a range of programs designed to improve the capacity of the Forum member countries and to co-ordinate action on matters of common interest:

1. Development and Economic Policy
2. Trade and Investment
3. Political, International and Legal Affairs
4. Corporate Services

The Forum Economic Ministers Meeting (FEMM) established in 1995, plays a key role in assessing regional economic developments.

== Pacific Island Countries Trade Agreement ==
The Pacific Island Countries Trade Agreement (PICTA) aims to establish a free-trade area between 14 of the Pacific Islands Forum countries. As of 2013, it had been signed by 12 states:

- Cook Islands
- Fiji
- Kiribati
- Micronesia
- Nauru
- Niue
- Papua New Guinea
- Samoa
- Solomon Islands
- Tonga
- Tuvalu
- Vanuatu

It has not been signed by either Palau or the Marshall Islands. All of the signing states have ratified the treaty, with the exception of Micronesia. As of March 2008, six countries had announced that domestic arrangements had been made enabling them to trade under the agreement: Cook Islands, Fiji, Niue, Samoa, Solomon Islands, and Vanuatu.

After the trade agreement goes into force, countries commit to removing tariffs on most goods by 2021. As of April 2008, The Forum Island Countries are also negotiating an Economic Partnership Agreement (EPA) with the European Union. The PICTA discussed here covers only the trade of goods. At the Forum Island Leaders Meeting held in Rarotonga, Cook Islands on 28 August 2012, nine members signed the Pacific Island Countries Trade Agreement Trade in Services (PICTA TIS). As of April 2008, there is an ongoing negotiation to design and agree on a protocol to include trade in services and the temporary movement of natural persons (a broader concept than the GATS's Mode 4).

The Office of the Chief Trade Adviser was established on 29 March 2010 to provide independent advice and support to the Pacific Forum Island Countries (FICs) in the PACER Plus trade negotiations with Australia and New Zealand.

== Blue Pacific – collective security interests of member states ==
The Biketawa Declaration (2000) on collective security committed Pacific Islands Forum members to seven principles, including good governance, liberty of the individual, democratic processes, indigenous rights and cultural values, traditions and customs, and recognising the importance and urgency of equitable economic, social and cultural development to satisfy the basic needs and aspirations of the peoples of the Forum.

The Boe Declaration (2018) of Regional Security is a declaration agreed to by all the leaders of the Pacific Islands Forum on 5 September 2018, which declaration is a framework for coordinating response to regional crises, and sets out an expanded concept of security. The Boe Declaration extended the Biketawa Declaration (2000) to include issues of human security, environmental security, transnational crime, and cybersecurity.

The expanded concept of security set out in the Boe Declaration has been applied in the Falepili Union between Tuvalu and Australia (2023).

== Recent works ==
An "open skies" policy has been under work by a number of nations. The Pacific Islands Air Services Agreement or PIASA would allow member nations to have more access for their airlines to other member countries. To date there have been ten signatories, Cook Islands, Kiribati, Nauru, Niue, Papua New Guinea, Samoa, Solomon Islands, Tonga, Tuvalu, and Vanuatu. Six countries have ratified the agreement: Cook Islands, Nauru, Niue, Samoa, Tonga, and Vanuatu.

At the 19–20 August 2008 Pacific Islands Forum meeting in Niue, the leaders discussed Pacific Plan priorities including, "fisheries, energy, trade and economic integration, climate change and transport, in addition to information and communication technology, health, education, and good governance." Leaders also discussed the impacts of climate change and adopted the Niue Declaration on Climate Change. Restoration of democratic governance in Fiji was discussed as were consequences should the interim government fail to meet established deadlines. Regional assistance to the Solomon Islands and Nauru was discussed, followed by discussion of radioactive contamination in the Marshall Islands from US government tests. Regional institutional framework issues and WTO Doha round developments were discussed, followed by discussion of country-initiatives and the Pacific Region Infrastructure Facility launched 19 August 2008 to provide up to A$200 million over four years to help improve infrastructure in Kiribati, Samoa, Solomon Islands, Tonga, Tuvalu and Vanuatu. The United Nations announced that it would partner with Samoa to develop an Inter-Agency Climate Change Centre to help Pacific island nations combat the impacts of climate change in the region. In the 2013 forum, the Marshall Islands, supported by all other Pacific nations, claimed compensation from the United States for the nuclear tests conducted on the islands during the 1940s and 1950s.

In the Nadi Bay declaration of 30 July 2019, the Pacific Islands Forum warned that coral atoll nations could be uninhabitable as early as 2030, expressed their deeply concern about a lack of "comprehension, ambition or commitment" from developed nations and called for an immediate reduction of greenhouse gas emissions.

On 27 January 2021, the European Union and the Pacific Islands Forum Secretariat agreed a project worth EUR 5.75 million to enhance the trade capacity of Pacific Island countries. The project titled "Strengthening Pacific Intra-Regional and International Trade (SPIRIT)" is designed to boost and increase intra-regional and international trade by strengthening institutional and technical capacity in the Pacific Island region. It will also facilitate the implementation of other trade agreements, in particular the Economic Partnership Agreement (EPA) and of the Pacific's Aid-for-Trade Strategy 2020–2025.

== Summits ==
PIF Summits
#	Year	Dates	Country	City	Leaders	Ref.
44	2013	3-6 September	Marshall Islands	Majuro	18: (Australia); (Cook Islands); (Federated States of Micronesia); (Fiji); (French Polynesia); (Marshall Islands); (Nauru); (New Caledonia); (New Zealand); (Niue); (Palau); (Papua New Guinea); (Samoa); (Solomon Islands); (Tonga); (Tuvalu); (Vanuatu)	
45	2014	29-31 July	Palau	Ngerulmud and Koror	18: (Australia); (Cook Islands); (Federated States of Micronesia); (Fiji); (French Polynesia); (Marshall Islands); (Nauru); (New Caledonia); (New Zealand); (Niue); (Palau); (Papua New Guinea); (Samoa); (Solomon Islands); (Tonga); (Tuvalu); (Vanuatu)	
46	2015	8-10 September	Papua New Guinea	Port Moresby	18: (Australia); (Cook Islands); (Federated States of Micronesia); (Fiji); (French Polynesia); (Marshall Islands); (Nauru); (New Caledonia); (New Zealand); (Niue); (Palau); (Papua New Guinea); (Samoa); (Solomon Islands); (Tonga); (Tuvalu); (Vanuatu)	
47	2016	8-10 September	Federated States of Micronesia	Pohnpei	18: (Australia) Malcolm Turnbull; (Cook Islands); (Federated States of Micronesia); (Fiji); (French Polynesia); (Marshall Islands); (Nauru); (New Caledonia); (New Zealand); (Niue); (Palau); (Papua New Guinea); (Samoa); (Solomon Islands); (Tonga); (Tuvalu); (Vanuatu)	
48	2017	5-8 September	Samoa	Apia	18: (Australia) Malcolm Turnbull; (Cook Islands); (Federated States of Micronesia); (Fiji); (French Polynesia); (Marshall Islands); (Nauru); (New Caledonia); (New Zealand); (Niue); (Palau); (Papua New Guinea); (Samoa); (Solomon Islands); (Tonga); (Tuvalu); (Vanuatu)	
49	2018	3-6 September	Nauru	Yaren	18: (Australia); (Cook Islands); (Federated States of Micronesia); (Fiji); (French Polynesia); (Marshall Islands); (Nauru); (New Caledonia); (New Zealand) Jacinda Ardern; (Niue); (Palau); (Papua New Guinea); (Samoa); (Solomon Islands); (Tonga); (Tuvalu); (Vanuatu)	
50	2019	14–16 August	Tuvalu	Funafuti	18: (Australia) Scott Morrison; (Cook Islands); (Federated States of Micronesia); (Fiji); (French Polynesia); (Marshall Islands); (Nauru); (New Caledonia); (New Zealand) Jacinda Ardern; (Niue); (Palau); (Papua New Guinea); (Samoa); (Solomon Islands); (Tonga); (Tuvalu) Enele Sopoaga; (Vanuatu)	
	2021	6 August	Fiji	Virtual meeting (Video conference) Suva	18: (Australia) Scott Morrison; (Cook Islands) Mark Brown; (Federated States of Micronesia) David Panuelo; (Fiji) Frank Bainimarama; (French Polynesia); (Marshall Islands); (Nauru); (New Caledonia); (New Zealand) Jacinda Ardern; (Niue) Dalton Tagelagi; (Palau) Surangel Whipps Jr.; (Papua New Guinea) James Marape; (Samoa); (Solomon Islands) Manasseh Sogavare; (Tonga) Pōhiva Tuʻiʻonetoa; (Tuvalu) Kausea Natano; (Vanuatu) Bob Loughman	
51	2022	11–14 July	Fiji	Suva	18: (Australia) Anthony Albanese; (Cook Islands); (Federated States of Micronesia) David Panuelo; (Fiji) Frank Bainimarama; (French Polynesia); (Marshall Islands); (Nauru); (New Caledonia); (New Zealand) Jacinda Ardern; (Niue) Dalton Tagelagi; (Palau) Surangel Whipps Jr.; (Papua New Guinea) James Marape; (Samoa); (Solomon Islands) Manasseh Sogavare; (Tonga) Siaosi Sovaleni; (Tuvalu); (Vanuatu) Bob Loughman	
52	2023	6–10 November	Cook Islands	Rarotonga	18: (Australia) Anthony Albanese; (Cook Islands) Mark Brown; (Federated States of Micronesia); (Fiji); (French Polynesia); (Marshall Islands); (Nauru); (New Caledonia); (New Zealand) Carmel Sepuloni; (Niue); (Palau); (Papua New Guinea); (Samoa); (Solomon Islands); (Tonga); (Tuvalu); (Vanuatu)	
53	2024	26–30 August	Tonga	Nukuʻalofa	18: (Australia) Anthony Albanese; (Cook Islands) Mark Brown; (Federated States of Micronesia); (Fiji); (French Polynesia); (Marshall Islands); (Nauru); (New Caledonia); (New Zealand) Christopher Luxon; (Niue); (Palau); (Papua New Guinea); (Samoa); (Solomon Islands); (Tonga) Siaosi Sovaleni; (Tuvalu); (Vanuatu)	
54	2025	8-12 September	Solomon Islands	Honiara	18: (Australia) Anthony Albanese; (Cook Islands) Mark Brown; (Federated States of Micronesia); (Fiji); (French Polynesia); (Marshall Islands); (Nauru); (New Caledonia); (New Zealand) Christopher Luxon; (Niue); (Palau); (Papua New Guinea); (Samoa); (Solomon Islands) Jeremiah Manele; (Tonga); (Tuvalu); (Vanuatu)	
54	2026	30 August-3 September	Palau	Koror	18: (Australia) Anthony Albanese; (Cook Islands) Mark Brown; (Federated States of Micronesia); (Fiji); (French Polynesia); (Marshall Islands); (Nauru); (New Caledonia); (New Zealand) Christopher Luxon; (Niue); (Palau) Surangel Whipps Jr.; (Papua New Guinea); (Samoa); (Solomon Islands); (Tonga); (Tuvalu); (Vanuatu)	

== See also ==
- Forum Fisheries Agency
- Melanesian Spearhead Group
- Pacific Community
- Pacific Forum Line – a regional shipping company owned by 12 Pacific Islands Forum member countries
- Pacific Games
- Pacific Islands Private Sector Organisation (PIPSO)
- Pacific Trade Invest
- Pacific Union
- Polynesian Leaders Group
- Trade bloc
