= Embassy of Australia, Paris =

Building in Île-de-France, France

Coordinates: 48°51′18″N 2°17′27″E

- Side view of the Australian Embassy Building, Paris, France
- Location: Paris, France
- Address: 4 Rue Jean-Rey; Paris 75724
- Ambassador: Lynette Wood
- Website: france.embassy.gov.au/pari/home.html

The Australian Embassy in Paris is located 400 metres (1,300 ft) southwest of the Eiffel Tower, on Rue Jean-Rey in the 15th arrondissement of Paris, near the Bir-Hakeim Bridge on the Seine. The embassy is situated on a triangular shaped block, and comprises a pair of nine-storey buildings. The Chancellery Building houses Australia's missions to France, to UNESCO and to the OECD, and the apartment of the ambassador to France; the other building contains 34 staff apartments, all with views of the Seine and the Eiffel Tower.

The embassy, and several pieces of its original furniture, were designed in a modernist style by Australian architect Harry Seidler, with Marcel Breuer and Pier Luigi Nervi as consulting designers. Like many of Seidler's other works, the embassy was built from precast modularised concrete, with a quartz and granite faced exterior and prestressed precast floors. Its two buildings are curved to form two quarter circles, the two arcs of an S-shaped complex, with the radii of the circles lined up to match the axes of the Eiffel Tower and the Champ de Mars.

The land for the embassy, that was a part of the disused railway depot near the old station of the Champ de Mars, was purchased by the McMahon government of Australia in 1972. Construction started on the embassy in 1975, and it was completed in 1977.

== History of the Embassy ==
Australia's diplomatic mission, through the Department of Foreign Affairs (DFAT), represents the Commonwealth of Australia on foreign soil. Australia's current number of diplomatic missions is over 100 globally with one crucial one with France, and the Australian embassy in Paris spearheading the diplomatic mission there. There is a mutual bond between France and Australia based on common ideals of democracy, historical contacts, deep economic ties, and a strong interest in each other's culture. The Australian Embassy in Paris represents Australia's national interest within France and serves to see Australia's diplomatic mission in France. To reinforce Australian, French prosperity and interests, the Australian-French diplomatic relationship cooperates on topics such as culture, economic and political affiliations. A designer named Harry Seidler built the complex as it has begun its bilateral operation in 1977. The Australian Embassy in Paris manages a foundation that is shared between Australia-France facilitating cultural events and exchanges by publishing an annual newsletter called L’Australia en France supporting Australian affairs placed in France. The cultural awards scheme of the Department of Foreign Affairs and Trade has also fostered ties between France and Australia.

Since 1996, the International Energy Agency has leased space within the embassy buildings for their headquarters.

== Architecture & Construction ==
A view of the two curved complexes following the axis of the Champ de Mars.

The embassy's construction started in 1973, was finalised in 1977, and officially opened in 1978. The building was designed by Australian architect Harry Seidler as the main architect, with Marcel Breuer and Pier Luigi Nervi. The embassy's architectural floor plans offer an interesting look into Harry Seidler's traditional sense behind the architecture. There is a detailed overview of the office and the residential areas which offer a valid appreciation of his architectural work. Harry Seidler has employed various methodologies to construct his designs and the architectural reports from him provide insight into various design approaches which consist of technology preparation and aesthetic orientation. The embassy's design was formulated from precast modularised combined with a quartz and granite-faced exterior and pressured precast story similar to Seidler's different models. The embassy is located on a triangular-shaped complex and consist of quadrant-structured development on nine floors. The two curved complexes were situated to prevent contact with each other as it was designed to maximise a view of the scenery of the river with the city in the same frame. The buildings together follow the axis of the Champ de Mars. The Chancery's residence in the complex is Australia's missions to UNESCO and OECD and further office rooms are currently rented out in one building with the additional including 34 employees’ apartments.

== Ambassadors ==
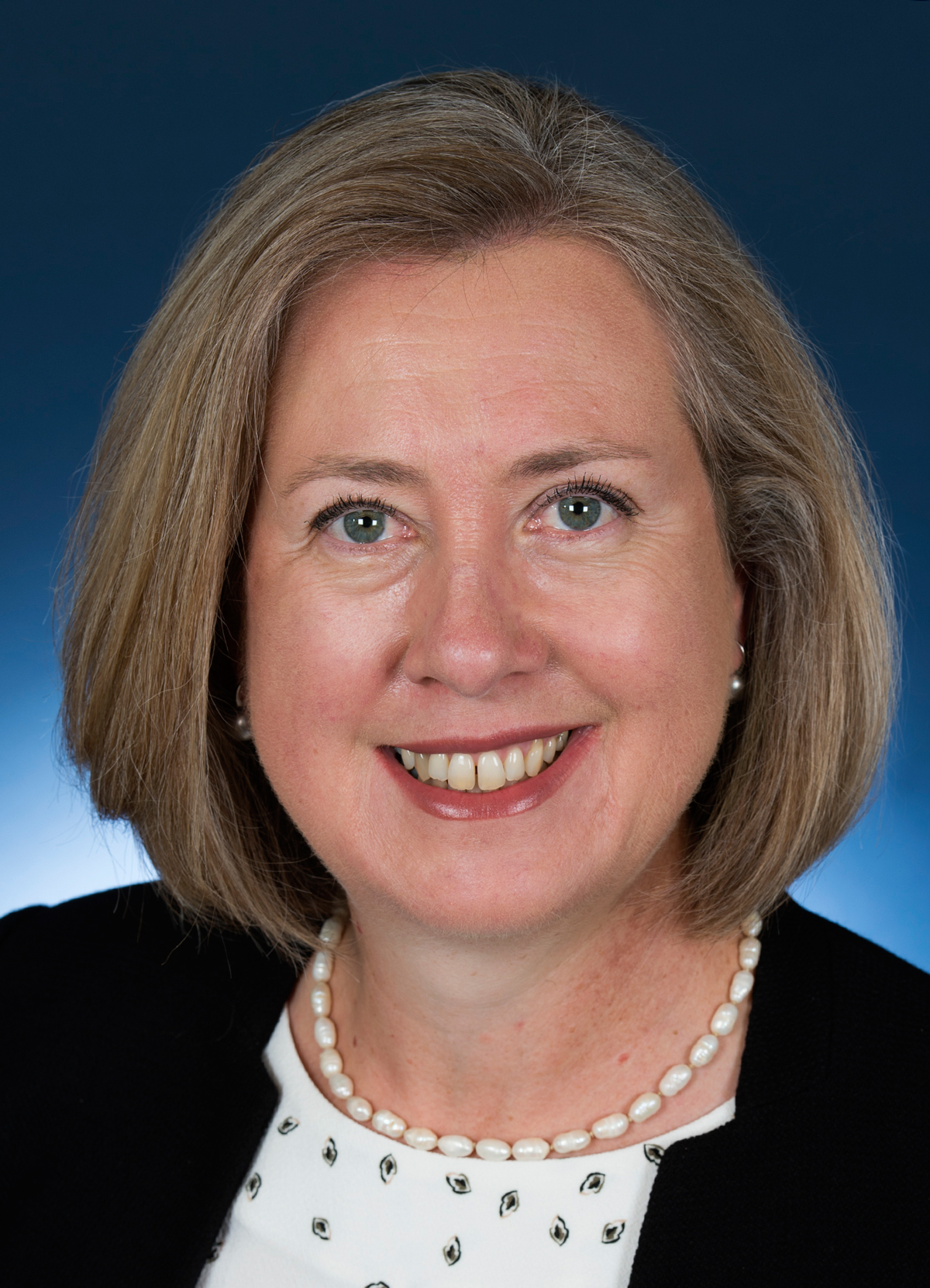
Lynette Wood, current Ambassador

The Ambassador of Australia to France is the representative of the Embassy of the Commonwealth of Australia to the French republic and an official of the Australian Department of Foreign Affairs and Trade. The position of the Australian Ambassador to France is currently held by Gillian Bird. In 1945, Australia opened its legation in Paris, Australia and France commenced their official diplomatic tie. During this time, Keith Officer was appointed as the Ambassador at the legation in April 1950 to take the place of William Hodgson when it had refurbished to embassy status. Making Keith Officer the first Ambassador of Australia to France at the Embassy of Australia in Paris.

=== List of all the Ambassadors ===
Ambassador	In office	
Keith Officer	1950	1955
Alfred Stirling	1955	1959
Edward Ronald Walker	1959	1968
Alan Renouf	1968	1973
Harold David Anderson	1973	1978
John Rowland	1978	1982
Peter Curtis	1982	1987
Ted Pocock	1987	1991
Clive Jones	1991	1993
Alan Brown	1993	1996
John Spender	1996	2000
Bill Fisher	2000	2005
Penny Wensley	2005	2008
David Ritchie	2008	2011
Ric Wells	2011	2014
Stephen Brady	28 September 2014	16 October 2017
Brendan Berne	2017	2020
Gillian Bird	2020	2024
Lynette Wood	2024	Present

== See also ==
- Australia–France relations
- List of diplomatic missions of Australia
