= List of ambassadors of Australia to Morocco =

Ambassador of Australia to Morocco
- Incumbent; Damien Donavan since October 2024
- Department of Foreign Affairs and Trade
- Style: His Excellency
- Reports to: Minister for Foreign Affairs
- Seat: Paris (1978–2017); Rabat (2017–date)
- Nominator: Prime Minister of Australia
- Appointer: Governor General of Australia
- Inaugural holder: Harold David Anderson
- Formation: 13 July 1976
- Website: Australian Embassy, Morocco

The Ambassador of Australia to Morocco is an officer of the Australian Department of Foreign Affairs and Trade and the head of the Embassy of the Commonwealth of Australia to the Kingdom of Morocco. The Ambassador resides in Rabat. The current ambassador since October 2024 is Damien Donavan. From 1976 to 2017, the position was concurrently held by the Australian Ambassador to France, resident in Paris.

== Posting history ==
On 13 July 1976, the Australian Minister for Foreign Affairs, Andrew Peacock, announced the release of a joint statement marking the establishment of diplomatic relations with Morocco as "a mark of the desire of both countries to consolidate and strengthen mutual understanding and to stimulate cultural and commercial links." On 19 January 1977, the serving Australian Ambassador to France, Harold David Anderson, presented his credentials as the non-resident accredited ambassador to King Hassan II of Morocco.

In February 2012, the Australian Parliament Foreign Affairs Sub-committee of the Joint Standing Committee on Foreign Affairs, Defence and Trade undertook an inquiry into the state of Australia's overseas postings. The Ambassador of Morocco to Australia, Mohamed Mael-Ainin, subsequently made a submission to the inquiry arguing for the establishment of an Australian embassy in Morocco, noting: "An Australian embassy in Rabat, like all other great powers, will give an impetus to our ascending bilateral cooperation as well as facilitate Australia’s interests in neighbouring countries, especially French-speaking countries, in Africa."

The Department of Foreign Affairs and Trade also noted to the committee that "an embassy in Morocco would increase Australia’s capacity to engage with a significant player in North Africa, including in the Arab League and the Organisation of Islamic Cooperation." The subsequent report of the committee, entitled Australia’s Overseas Representation – Punching below our weight?, observed in its recommendations that "there is merit in opening an embassy in Morocco to serve the Maghreb and notes that this is in DFAT’s plans for an expanded network should it receive sufficient funds." In November 2016, Foreign Minister Julie Bishop visited Morocco for the 2016 United Nations Climate Change Conference in Marrakech, and announced the opening of an Australian Embassy in Rabat at a joint press conference with Foreign Minister Salaheddine Mezouar.

On 12 May 2017, Foreign Minister Julie Bishop announced the establishment of the Australian Embassy in Rabat and Berenice Owen-Jones as the new ambassador (taking up office in June 2017), noting that this appointment would be "an important addition to Australia’s diplomatic presence in Africa and part of the single largest expansion of our diplomatic network in 40 years." The new Australian Embassy in Rabat upgraded an existing Austrade office in the city. The Austrade office in Rabat was closed in January 2025. Austrade now covers Morocco from Paris. The Australian Centre for International Agricultural Research (ACIAR) opened an office within the Australian Embassy, Rabat in January 2026.

== Ambassadors ==
#	Officeholder	Residency	Term start date	Term end date	Time in office	Notes
1	Harold David Anderson	Paris, France	13 July 1976	6 October 1978	2 years, 85 days	
2	John Rowland	Paris, France	6 October 1978	July 1982	3–4 years	
3	Peter Curtis	Paris, France	July 1982	October 1987	4–5 years	
4	Ted Pocock	Paris, France	October 1987	September 1991	3–4 years	
5	Kim Jones	Paris, France	September 1991	August 1993	1–2 years	
6	Alan Brown	Paris, France	August 1993	October 1996	2–3 years	
7	John Spender	Paris, France	October 1996	November 2000	3–4 years	
8	Bill Fisher	Paris, France	November 2000	7 March 2005	4–5 years	
9	Penny Wensley	Paris, France	7 March 2005	March 2008	2–3 years	
10	David Ritchie	Paris, France	March 2008	December 2011	2–3 years	
11	Ric Wells	Paris, France	January 2012	October 2014	2–3 years	
12	Stephen Brady	Paris, France	October 2014	June 2017	2 years, 243 days	
13	Berenice Owen-Jones	Rabat, Morocco	June 2017	October 2020	3 years, 122 days	
14	Michael Cutts	Rabat, Morocco	October 2020	October 2024	4 years, 0 days	
15	Damien Donavan	Rabat, Morocco	October 2024	incumbent		

== See also ==
- Australia–Morocco relations
- List of ambassadors of Morocco to Australia
