= List of ambassadors of Australia to Algeria =

Ambassador of Australia to Algeria

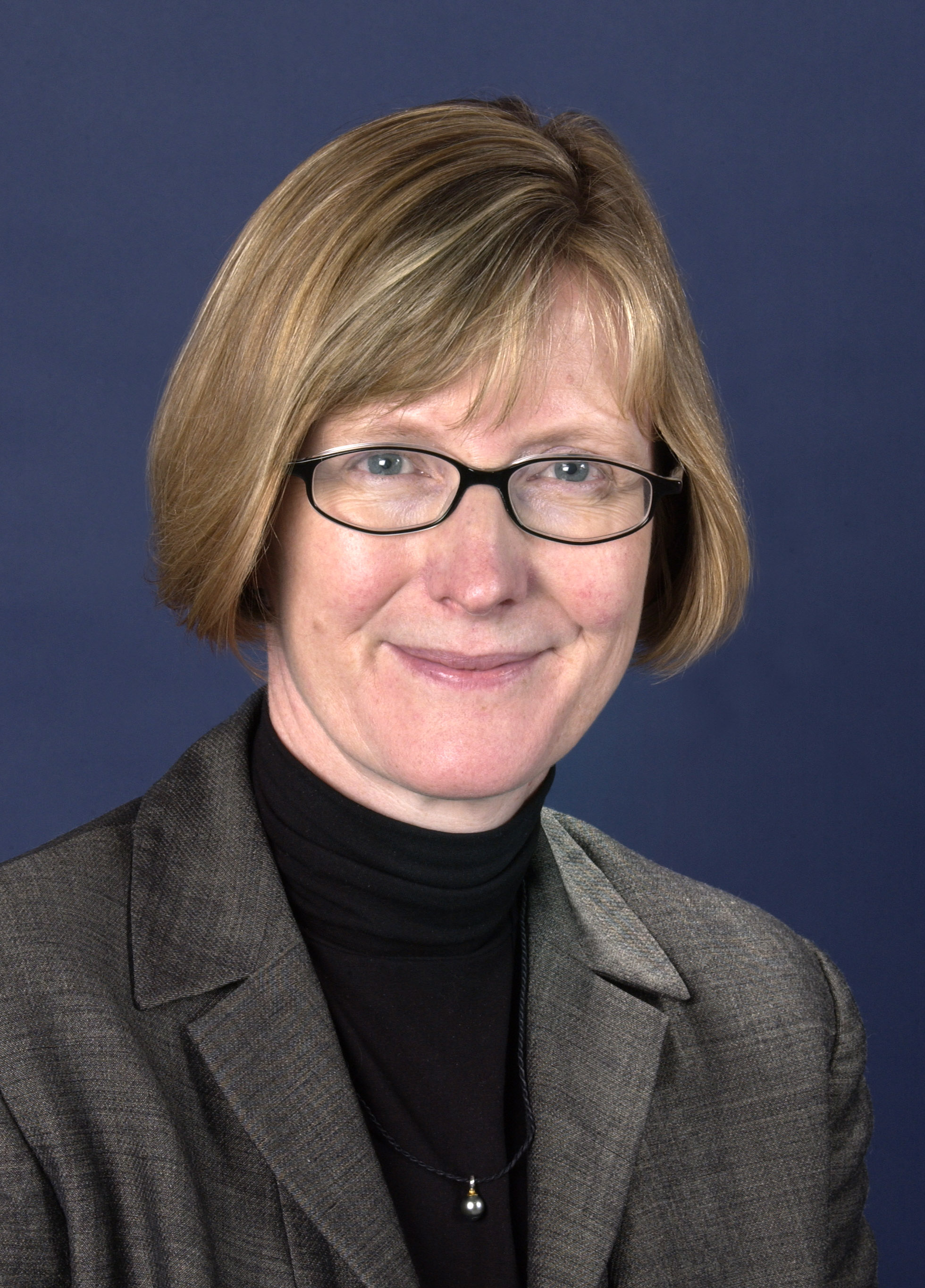
- Incumbent; Gillian Bird PSM since 5 November 2020
- Department of Foreign Affairs and Trade
- Style: His Excellency
- Reports to: Minister for Foreign Affairs
- Residence: Paris, France
- Nominator: Prime Minister of Australia
- Appointer: Governor General of Australia
- Inaugural holder: Bruce Woodberry (as Chargé d'affaires )
- Formation: 1975

The ambassador of Australia to Algeria is an officer of the Australian Department of Foreign Affairs and Trade and the head of the Embassy of the Commonwealth of Australia to the People's Democratic Republic of Algeria. Currently the Australian ambassador to France is responsible for representing Australian interests in Algeria, resident in Paris, France. The current non-resident ambassador, since November 2020, is Gillian Bird PSM.

== List of heads of mission ==
Ordinal	Officeholder	Title	Residency	Term start date	Term end date	Time in office	Notes
–	Bruce Woodberry	Chargé d'affaires	Algiers, Algeria	1975	1976	0–1 years	
1	John Anthony Piper	Ambassador of Australia to Algeria	Algiers, Algeria	1976	1979	2–3 years	
2	John Brook	Ambassador of Australia to Algeria	Algiers, Algeria	1979	1980	0–1 years	
3	Michael McKeown	Ambassador of Australia to Algeria	Algiers, Algeria	1980	1984	3–4 years	
4	C.G. O'Hanlon	Ambassador of Australia to Algeria	Algiers, Algeria	1984	1986	1–2 years	
5	J. N. Skinner	Ambassador of Australia to Algeria	Algiers, Algeria	1987	1989	1–2 years	
6	M. P. F. Smith	Ambassador of Australia to Algeria	Algiers, Algeria	1989	1991	1–2 years	
7	Clive Jones	Ambassador of Australia to Algeria	Paris, France	1991	1993	1–2 years	
8	Alan Brown	Ambassador of Australia to Algeria	Paris, France	1993	1996	2–3 years	
9	John Spender KC	Ambassador of Australia to Algeria	Paris, France	1996	1998	1–2 years	
10	Victoria Owen PSM	Ambassador of Australia to Algeria	Cairo, Egypt	1998	2002	3–4 years	
11	Stephen Brady AO, CVO	Ambassador of Australia to Algeria	Paris, France	28 September 2014	16 October 2017	3 years, 18 days	
12	Brendan Berne	Ambassador of Australia to Algeria	Paris, France	21 July 2017	October 2020	3 years, 2 months	
13	Gillian Bird PSM	Ambassador of Australia to Algeria	Paris, France	5 November 2020	incumbent	5 years, 306 days	
