= List of ambassadors of Australia to Germany =

Ambassador of Australia to Germany

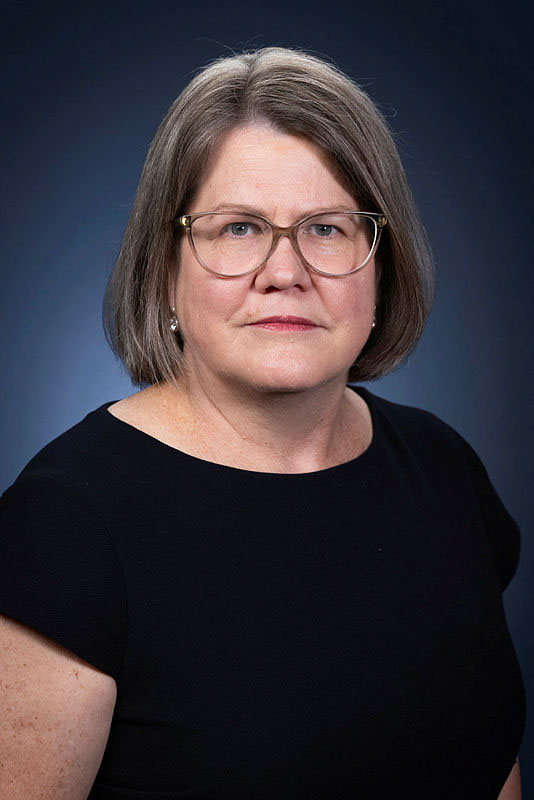
- Incumbent; Natasha Smith since 20 March 2024
- Department of Foreign Affairs and Trade
- Style: Her Excellency
- Reports to: Minister for Foreign Affairs
- Residence: Douglasstraße, Berlin-Grunewald
- Seat: Bonn (1952–1999); Berlin (Since 1999)
- Nominator: Prime Minister of Australia
- Appointer: Governor General of Australia
- Inaugural holder: Noël Deschamps (as Chargé d'Affaires)
- Formation: 28 January 1952
- Website: Australian Embassy, Germany

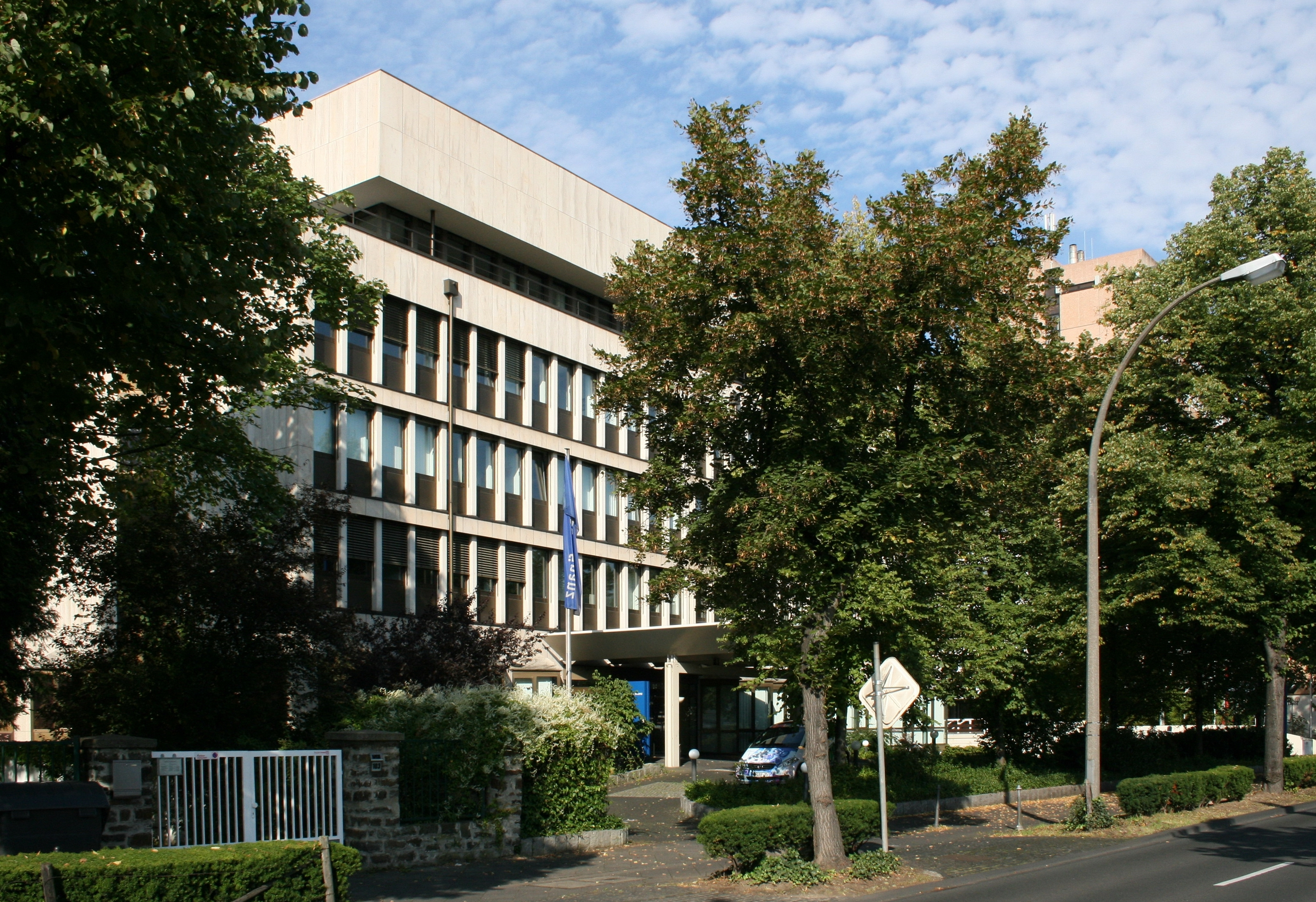
The former Australian Embassy chancery in Bad Godesberg, Bonn, 1978–1999.

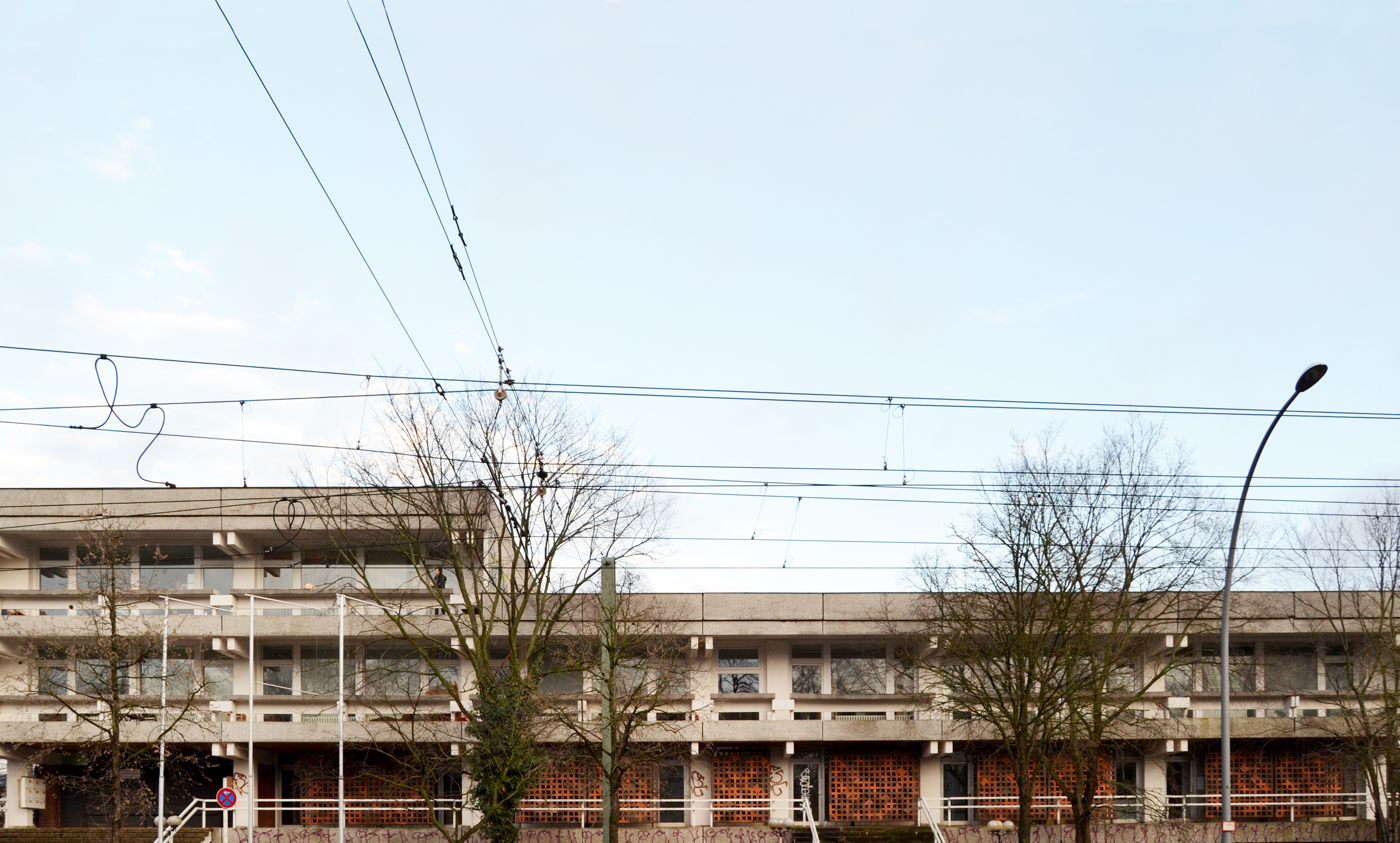
The former Australian Embassy to East Germany in Niederschönhausen, Pankow, 1977–1986.

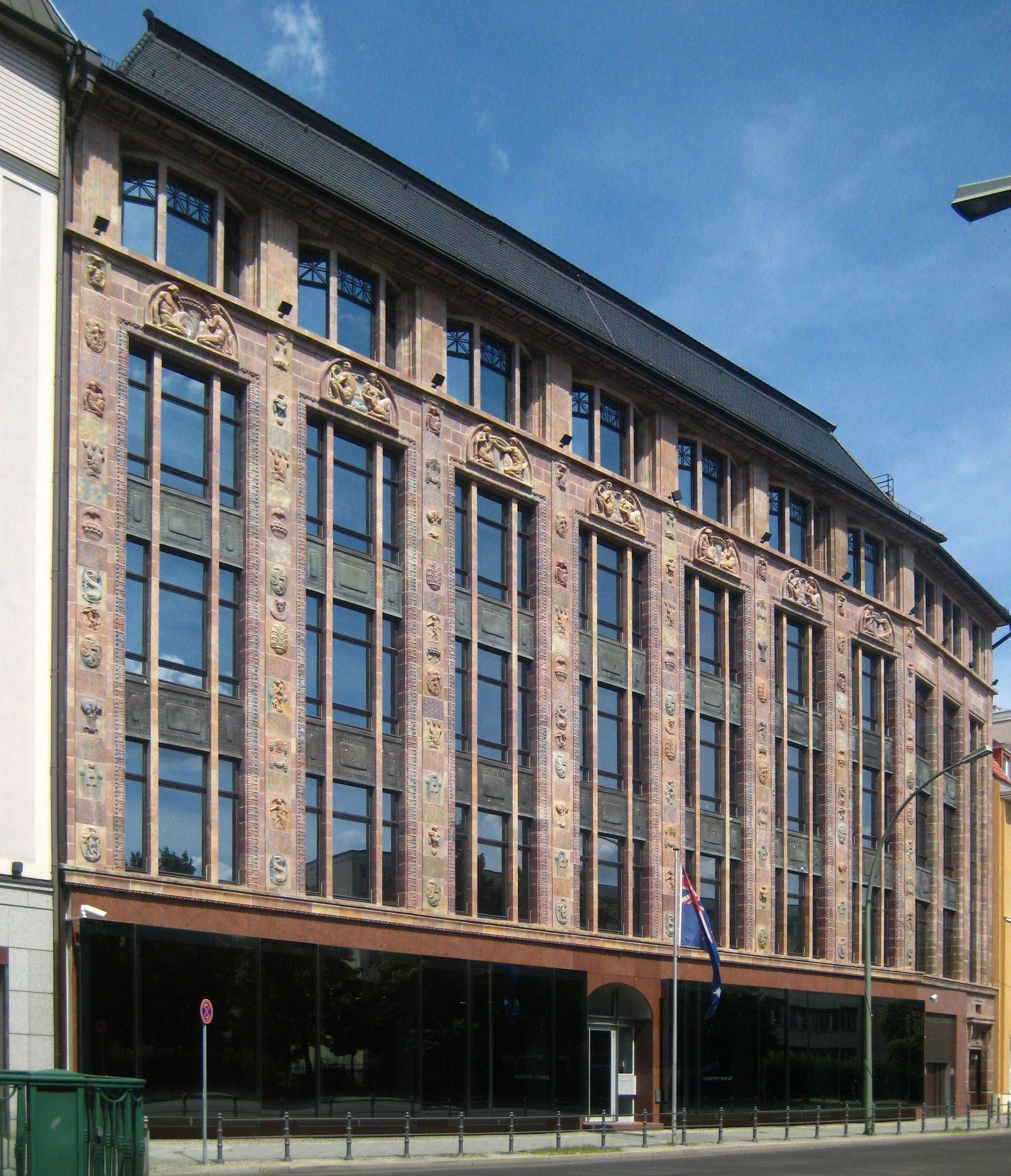
The Australian Embassy since 1999 at No. 76-79 Wallstraße, Berlin.

The ambassador of Australia to Germany is an officer of the Australian Department of Foreign Affairs and Trade and the head of the Embassy of the Commonwealth of Australia to the Federal Republic of Germany. The position has the rank and status of an ambassador extraordinary and plenipotentiary and formerly held non-resident accreditation for Switzerland (1993–2022) and Liechtenstein (1999–2022), until the establishment of a resident Australian Embassy in Berne on 22 November 2022. Since 1986 there has also been a Consulate-General in Frankfurt am Main, the German financial capital, which is managed by Austrade. The current ambassador since March 2024 is Natasha Smith.

== Posting history ==
=== Early representation and the Military Mission in Berlin ===
Immediately prior to the end of the war in Europe on 8 May 1945, on 15 March 1945 the Australian Cabinet recommended the appointment of an Australian Military Mission to the Allied Control Council for Germany and Austria, to consist of one representative from each of the armed services and a political adviser. On 3 October 1945, Brigadier Tom Warren White was appointed Head of the Australian Military Mission in Berlin, and career diplomat with the Department of External Affairs, J. D. L. Hood, was appointed political advisor, taking up office on 15 December 1945. On 1 January 1948, the Department of External Affairs took over responsibility for the mission in Berlin from the Department of Defence, and Brigadier White was succeeded by Brigadier Frederick Galleghan on 23 January 1948. On 17 November 1949, a career diplomat, Noël Deschamps, was appointed as the acting head of the military mission, and in May 1950 a new office of the Australian Mission was established in the city of Bonn, the provisional capital of the federal republic, with accreditation to the Allied High Commission for occupied Germany.

Deschamps continued to serve as acting head of the Bonn Mission, and then as Chargé d'Affaires from 28 January 1952, when the Bonn mission was upgraded to the status of embassy. With the appointment of J. D. L. Hood as Australia's first Ambassador to the Federal Republic of Germany in April 1952, Hood would also hold office as the Head of the Australian Military Mission in Berlin, with a Deputy Head of Mission being resident in Berlin from 1955. This situation continued, including also holding office as Consul-General in the city from 16 January 1972, until the post was scaled down on 15 September 1976 and the Berlin mission was closed on 30 April 1987.

=== Embassy in Bonn, 1952–1999 ===
On 28 January 1952, the Minister for External Affairs, Richard Casey, announced that the Australian Mission in Bonn would be upgraded to the status of embassy and that formal diplomatic relations would be established with the Federal Republic of Germany (West Germany), noting that this action "reflected the extent to which Western Germany, in close association with the United Kingdom, the United States and other free nations on the Continent, is co-operating in maintaining stability in Europe. Future developments in Germany would have a significant influence on world peace, and it was desirable that Australia should be adequately represented there." On 8 April 1952, the appointment of J. D. L. Hood as Australia's first Ambassador to the Federal Republic of Germany was announced.

In 1964, an office of the Australian Trade Commission and Consulate was opened in the city of Hamburg, with the first Trade Commissioner and Consul, Terence Cronin, having responsibility for "trade inquiries for Australian foodstuffs and manufactures, ... to assist in the preparation of commodity surveys, organise trade fairs as allocated by [the embassy in] Bonn, and report directly to Canberra on shipping and warehousing that might affect Australian trading interests", as well as being appointed as consul in the city to assist the embassy. Upgraded to a consulate-general in 1968, the Hamburg post was closed in 1979. In 1986 the Trade Commission moved its operations from the embassy in Bonn to a new office and consulate-general in the city of Frankfurt am Main, the German financial capital.

From 1974 to 1993 there was an embassy in Berne, Switzerland. In January 1993 the Berne embassy was closed and non-resident accreditation was transferred to the Australian Embassy in Bonn.

=== Embassy to the German Democratic Republic, 1973–1990 ===
On 22 December 1972, Australia and the German Democratic Republic (East Germany) formally established diplomatic relations, coming at a time of a more pragmatic Australian foreign policy under the direction of Prime Minister Gough Whitlam and Foreign Minister Don Willesee, with Whitlam noting: "Apart from facilitating trade in both directions, Australian recognition of East Germany would, when agreement is reached, make people in Europe more aware that there is a new government in Australia which is not concentrating on South-East Asia and the Pacific to the exclusion of our highly important relations with Europe." On 15 June 1973, it was announced that the incoming resident ambassador to Poland, Francis Hamilton Stuart, would receive non-resident accreditation as the first Australian ambassador to East Germany. In September 1974, however, it was announced by foreign minister Willesee that an Australian Embassy would be established in East Germany, which was achieved in March 1975, with the first resident ambassador, Malcolm Morris, presenting his credentials on 10 December 1975.

Budget cuts to the Department of Foreign Affairs by the government of Bob Hawke prompted the closure of the GDR Embassy on 19 December 1986, with non-resident accreditation returning to the Ambassador resident in Warsaw until the reunification of Germany on 3 October 1990, when a Consulate-General was opened in the unified city of Berlin.

=== Embassy in Berlin, since 1999 ===
With the unification of Germany in 1990, a new Consulate-General with resident representation was established in Berlin on 11 October 1990, with David Charles appointed as consul-general. Charles was succeeded in October 1993 by Margaret Adamson, who served until 1996. In order to facilitate the move to the new capital of Berlin, in 1995 the Australian Government purchased two historic buildings for the new embassy chancery, on Wallstraße and Markisches Ufer in Mitte, Berlin, which was opened on 17 August 1999. A newly-built ambassador's residence, in Grunewald, Charlottenburg-Wilmersdorf, was designed by Daryl Jackson Pty Ltd and completed in 1998.

In 2012 Australia and Germany celebrated 60 years of diplomatic relations. In November 2022, a resident embassy in Berne, Switzerland, was reopened and accreditation for Switzerland and Liechtenstein were transferred there.

== Heads of mission ==
=== Ambassadors to the Federal Republic of Germany ===
#	Officeholder	Other offices	Residency	Term start date	Term end date	Time in office	Notes
–	Noël Deschamps (Chargé d'Affaires)	^{A}	Bonn	28 January 1952	20 April 1952	83 days	
1	J. D. L. Hood	^{A}	Bonn	20 April 1952	9 June 1956	3 years, 269 days	
2	Patrick Shaw	^{A}	Bonn	9 June 1956	16 December 1959	3 years, 190 days	
–	Neil Truscott (Chargé d'Affaires)	^{A}	Bonn	16 December 1959	14 April 1960	120 days	
3	Sir Alan Watt	^{A}	Bonn	14 April 1960	22 March 1962	1 year, 342 days	
–	Neil Truscott (Chargé d'Affaires)	^{A}	Bonn	22 March 1962	6 September 1960	168 days	
4	Frederick Blakeney	^{A}	Bonn	6 September 1962	5 July 1968	5 years, 303 days	
–	David Goss (Chargé d'Affaires)	^{A}	Bonn	5 July 1968	27 August 1968	53 days	
5	Sir Edward Ronald Walker	^{A}	Bonn	27 August 1968	7 June 1971	2 years, 310 days	
6	Ralph Harry	^{A}	Bonn	9 September 1971	February 1975	2 years, 145 days	
7	Lew Border	^{A}	Bonn	February 1975	October 1977	2 years, 242 days	
8	Max Loveday	^{A}	Bonn	October 1977	October 1982	5 years, 30 days	
9	Robin Ashwin	^{A}	Bonn	2 November 1982	July 1987	4 years, 241 days	
10	Ray Greet	N/A	Bonn	July 1987	November 1990	3 years	
11	John Bowan	^{B}	Bonn	November 1990	December 1994	4 years, 1 month	
12	Max Hughes	^{B}	Bonn	December 1994	April 1999	4 years, 4 months	
13	Paul O'Sullivan	^{B}^{C}	Bonn	April 1999	17 August 1999	3 years, 9 months	
13	Paul O'Sullivan	^{B}^{C}	Berlin	17 August 1999	March 2003	3 years, 9 months	
14	Pamela J. Fayle	^{B}^{C}	Berlin	March 2003	April 2006	3 years, 1 month	
15	Ian Kemish	^{B}^{C}	Berlin	April 2006	24 August 2009	3 years, 4 months	
16	Peter Tesch	^{B}^{C}	Berlin	24 August 2009	24 October 2013	4 years, 61 days	
17	David Ritchie	^{B}^{C}	Berlin	24 October 2013	26 August 2016	2 years, 307 days	
18	Lynette Wood	^{B}^{C}	Berlin	26 August 2016	20 October 2020	4 years, 55 days	
19	Philip Green	^{B}^{C}	Berlin	20 October 2020	30 June 2023	5 years, 322 days	
–	Kate Luxford (Chargé d'Affaires)		Berlin	30 June 2023	20 March 2024	264 days	
20	Natasha Smith		Berlin	20 March 2024	–	–	

=== Notes ===
^A Also Head of the Australian Military Mission in Berlin, 1949–1987.
^B Also non-resident Ambassador to the Swiss Confederation, 1993–2022.
^C Also non-resident Ambassador to the Principality of Liechtenstein, 1999–2022.

=== Resident Heads of the Australian Military Mission, Berlin, 1945–1987 ===
Officeholder	Title	Term start date	Term end date	Time in office	Notes
Tom Warren White	Head	15 December 1945	23 January 1948	2 years, 1 month	
Frederick Galleghan	Head	23 January 1948	17 November 1949	1 year, 9 months	
Noël Deschamps	Acting Head	17 November 1949	11 August 1952	2 years, 268 days	
J. D. L. Hood	Ambassador and Head	11 August 1952	30 July 1955	2 years, 10 months	
James Cumes	Acting Head	30 July 1955	3 August 1956	1 year, 4 days	
James Cumes	Deputy Head	3 August 1956	3 July 1958	1 year, 4 days	
H. Douglas White	Deputy Head	3 July 1958	19 March 1961	2 years, 259 days	
Alfred Parsons	Deputy Head	19 March 1961	18 August 1962	1 year, 152 days	
Thomas Holland	Deputy Head	18 August 1962	6 February 1965	2 years, 172 days	
David Goss	Deputy Head	6 February 1965	24 August 1967	2 years, 199 days	
Philip Peters	Deputy Head	20 September 1967	4 September 1969	1 year, 349 days	
John Hoyle	Deputy Head	4 September 1969	22 December 1971	2 years, 109 days	
Kieran Desmond	Deputy Head and Consul-General	16 January 1972	20 December 1974	2 years, 338 days	
Stuart Hume	Deputy Head and Consul-General	8 March 1975	15 September 1976	1 year, 191 days	
Head of Mission held by Ambassador in Bonn, 1952–1987.

=== Ambassadors to the German Democratic Republic, 1973–1990 ===
#	Officeholder	Residency	Term start date	Term end date	Time in office	Notes
1	Francis Hamilton Stuart	Warsaw, Poland	19 October 1973	1 March 1975	1 year, 133 days	
–	Philip Frederic Peters (Chargé d'Affaires)	East Berlin	1 March 1975	2 December 1975	276 days	
2	Arthur Malcolm Morris	East Berlin	2 December 1975	1 June 1980	4 years, 182 days	
–	David Goss (Chargé d'Affaires)	East Berlin	1 June 1980	31 July 1980	60 days	
3	John Daniel McCredie	East Berlin	31 July 1980	12 March 1984	3 years, 225 days	
–	J. F. Godfrey (Chargé d'Affaires)	East Berlin	12 March 1984	18 April 1984	37 days	
4	Tony Vincent	East Berlin	18 April 1984	14 June 1986	2 years, 57 days	
5	Donald William Witheford	East Berlin	14 June 1985	19 December 1986	1 year, 188 days	
6	Max Hughes	Warsaw, Poland	19 December 1986	June 1987	164 days	
7	Wilson Lawry Herron	Warsaw, Poland	June 1987	3 October 1990	3 years, 124 days	

== See also ==
- Australia–Germany relations
- Australia–Switzerland relations
- List of German Ambassadors to Australia
- List of ambassadors of Australia to Switzerland
- Foreign relations of Australia
