= 2011 Australian Royal Visit Honours =

The 2011 Australian Royal Visit Honours for Australia were announced on 18 November 2011.

== Royal Victorian Order ==
=== Commander of the Royal Victorian Order (CVO) ===
- Stephen Brady, Secretary to the Governor General.
- Her Excellency Quentin Bryce, AC
- His Excellency Malcolm McCusker, AO, QC
- Kevin Leslie Skipworth, LVO

=== Lieutenant of the Royal Victorian Order (LVO) ===
- Terry Crane

=== Member of the Royal Victorian Order (MVO) ===
- Peta Louise Arbuckle
- Rebecca Louise Christie
- Commander Andrew Scott Willis, RAN
