= List of ambassadors of Morocco to Australia =

Ambassador of Morocco to Australia
- Incumbent; Wassane Zailachi since February 9, 2022
- Residence: Canberra, Australian Capital Territory
- Appointer: Mohammed VI
- Inaugural holder: Omar Hilale (resident in Indonesia)
- Formation: 1997

The ambassador of Morocco to Australia is the highest diplomatic representative of the Kingdom of Morocco in the Commonwealth of Australia. The ambassador resides in Canberra, Australian Capital Territory. The current ambassador, since February 2022, is Wassane Zailachi.

The ambassador concurrently serves as non-resident ambassador to New Zealand and the Pacific States of Vanuatu, Kiribati, Fiji, New Zealand, Papua New Guinea and Tuvalu.

== List of ambassadors ==
Ordinal	Officeholder	Residency	Term start date	Term end date	Time in office	Notes
1	Omar Hilale	Jakarta, Indonesia	1997	2001	3–4 years	
2	Abderrahmane Drissi Alami	Jakarta, Indonesia	2001	2005	3–4 years	
3	Badre Eddine Allali	Canberra, Australia	September 2005	2008	2–3 years	
4	Mohamed Mael-Ainin	Canberra, Australia	2009	October 2016	6–7 years	
5	Karim Medrek	Canberra, Australia	October 2016	January 2022	5 years, 3 months	
6	Wassane Zailachi	Canberra, Australia	9 February 2022	incumbent	4 years, 210 days	

== See also ==
- Australia–Morocco relations
- List of ambassadors of Australia to Morocco
