= Malcolm Hazell =

Australian public servant

Malcolm John Hazell CVO AO

9th Official Secretary to the Governor-General of Australia
- In office 9 May 2003 – 4 September 2008
- Monarch: Elizabeth II
- Governors-General: Peter Hollingworth (2003); Michael Jeffery (2003–08)
- Preceded by: Martin Bonsey
- Succeeded by: Stephen Brady

Personal details
- Born: Malcolm John Hazell; 17 December 1948 (age 77) Brisbane, Queensland
- Spouse: Rhondda née Scells
- Education: University of Queensland (BA)
- Awards: CVO; AO; KStJ

Malcolm John Hazell CVO AO (born 17 December 1948), is a 21st-century Australian public servant, who served as Official Secretary to two Governors-General of Australia, the Rt Revd Dr Peter Hollingworth (2003) and Major General Michael Jeffery (2003–2008).

== Early life ==
He was born in 1948 to WWII veteran, Neville John Hazell (1921–2008) and WRAN writer Joan Nell née Ekelund (1924–2016), who married at St John's Cathedral, Parramatta in 1945. Hazell was educated at the Anglican Church Grammar School, Brisbane and then the University of Queensland, graduating BA (Hons).

== Career ==
In 1974, Hazell joined Australian Public Service with the Department of the Prime Minister and Cabinet (PM&C), holding policy advising positions. He then worked on parliamentary and government matters and international relations, becoming Head of the Cabinet Secretariat from 1996 to 1998. As Head of the Office of Ceremonial and Hospitality, he supervised many arrangements, including the Australian Bicentenary celebrations in 1988, and served as Commonwealth Director of Royal Visits to Australia.

Seconded by Max Moore-Wilton as Senior Government Adviser to the Office of Prime Minister John Howard, in 2003 he became Official Secretary to the Governor-General of Australia, Archbishop Peter Hollingworth, and ex-officio Secretary of the Order of Australia. On Dr Hollingworth's resignation later that year, he continued to serve his successor as Governor-General, Major General Michael Jeffery.

In August 2008, there was considerable media comment when it was revealed that Jeffery's successor-designate, Quentin Bryce, had decided that she would appoint Stephen Brady as her Official Secretary when she took office on 5 September. This meant that after 30 years' experience in the Australian Public Service Hazell's job would be ending and, although he made no public comment, reportedly he was "distraught" when informed three weeks earlier by the Secretary of the Department of the Prime Minister and Cabinet, Terry Moran. It was reported that Jeffery confronted Bryce about the matter when they met in Brisbane. However, Prime Minister Kevin Rudd stated that neither he nor his office played any part in Bryce's decision. At the same time, Rudd recognised Bryce's right to decide who her Official Secretary should be, and said that Hazell would be offered another position within the public service.

== Honours and appointments ==
Invested as a Commander of the Royal Victorian Order by Queen Elizabeth II on 10 May 1988 for his "services during the 1988 Royal Visit", Hazell was appointed a Knight of the Order of St John in 2008.

Honoured in the 2009 Queen's Birthday Honours as a Member of the Order of Australia for "services to the community and to successive Australian Governments through senior positions in the Australian Public Service, and as Official Secretary to the Governor-General of Australia", Hazell was invested by newly-appointed Governor-General later Dame Quentin Bryce at Government House, Canberra on 7 September 2009, being promoted Officer of the Order of Australia in the 2021 Australia Day Honours.

Appointed on 11 June 2010, Hazell served as an Extra Equerry to Her Majesty Queen Elizabeth II.

Serving from 1994 until 2006 on Canberra Grammar School Board of Governors, as Chairman of the Education Committee and then as Deputy Chairman of the Board, Hazell is also involved in community education for the Anglican Church of Australia.

== Family ==
Married to Rhondda Leonie Scells, daughter of Ronald Gervase Scells (1908–1982), of Taringa, Queensland, the couple have two sons.

His uncle was Mervyn Thomas Hazell OAM (1919–2003) and a niece is Rebecca Hazell who in 1999 married the Hon. William Howson (formerly Fiennes-Clinton).

== Sources ==
- Edited transcript of a presentation to the ACT Branch of the Order of Australia Association, 23 March 2004

Government offices
Preceded by Martin Bonsey	Official Secretary to the Governor-General of Australia; 2003–2008	Succeeded by Stephen Brady
