= Ambassador of Australia for Asia-Pacific Economic Cooperation =

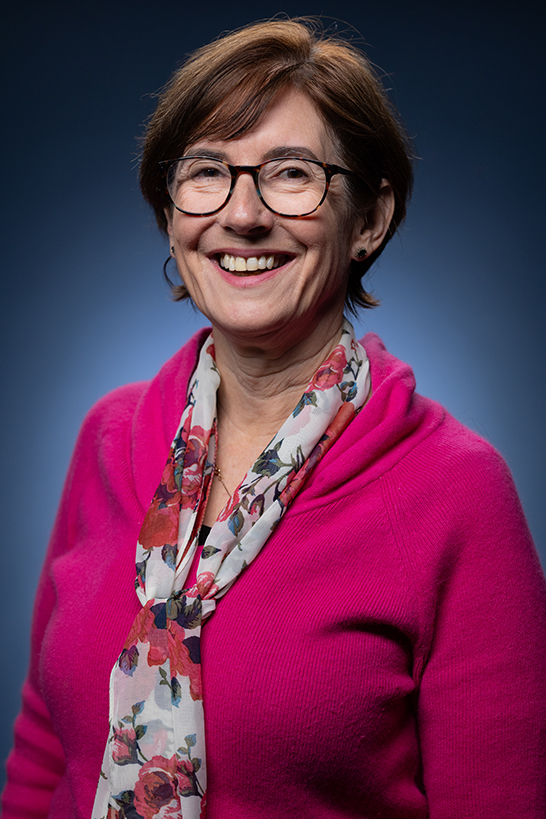
- Incumbent; Elizabeth Ward since 10 March 2024
- Style: Her Excellency
- Nominator: Prime Minister of Australia
- Appointer: Governor General of Australia
- Inaugural holder: Peter Grey
- Formation: March 1996
- Website: Asia-Pacific Economic Cooperation (APEC), DFAT

The ambassador of Australia for Asia-Pacific Economic Cooperation is an officer of the Australian Department of Foreign Affairs and Trade and the head of the delegation of the Commonwealth of Australia to the Asia-Pacific Economic Cooperation (APEC), based with its secretariat in Singapore. The position has the rank and status of an ambassador extraordinary and plenipotentiary and has been sent since March 1996, when Deputy Prime Minister and Minister for Trade Tim Fischer appointed Peter Grey as the first ambassador, although APEC has existed since 1989.

== List of ambassadors ==
| Ordinal | Officeholder | Image | Term start date | Term end date | Time in office | Notes |
|---|---|---|---|---|---|---|
| 1 | Peter Grey | | March 1996 | 8 April 1998 | 2 years, 38 days | |
| 2 | Joanna Hewitt | | 8 April 1998 | 25 May 2000 | 2 years, 47 days | |
| 3 | Pamela Fayle | | 25 May 2000 | 20 December 2002 | 2 years, 209 days | |
| 4 | Dr Geoff Raby | | 20 December 2002 | 19 January 2005 | 2 years, 30 days | |
| 5 | Doug Chester | | 19 January 2005 | 19 December 2005 | 334 days | |
| 6 | David Spencer | | 19 December 2005 | 13 July 2009 | 3 years, 206 days | |
| 7 | Ric Wells | | 13 July 2009 | December 2011 | 2 years, 141 days | |
| (6) | David Spencer | | December 2011 | 20 September 2013 | 1 year, 293 days | |
| 8 | Sam Gerovich | | 20 September 2013 | 5 August 2015 | 1 year, 319 days | |
| 9 | Brendan Berne | | 5 August 2015 | 22 March 2017 | 1 year, 229 days | |
| 10 | Simon Newnham | | 22 March 2017 | 25 June 2021 | 4 years, 95 days | |
| 11 | Helen Stylianou | | 25 June 2021 | incumbent | 5 years, 73 days | |
