= Keith Brennan =

Australian diplomat and public servant

Keith Brennan AO
- Born: Keith Gabriel Brennan; 25 March 1915; Hawthorn, Melbourne
- Died: 16 January 1985 (aged 69); North Adelaide
- Education: University of Melbourne (LLB)
- Occupations: Public servant, diplomat
- Spouse: Suzanne Brennan (m. 1945; died 1977)

Keith Gabriel Brennan AO (25 March 1915 – 16 January 1985) was an Australian diplomat and public servant.

Born on 25 March 1915 in Hawthorn, Brennan was the youngest of five children. He was schooled at St Patrick's College, East Melbourne, before studying part time for a Bachelor of Laws at the University of Melbourne. He joined the Commonwealth Public Service in the Department of the Army in 1940.

Brennan transferred to the Department of External Affairs in 1947. His early overseas postings were to the United States and Japan. In 1972 he relocated to Dublin to serve as Australian Ambassador to Ireland. His time in Ireland was cut short when in 1974 Gough Whitlam decided to send Vince Gair to the post for domestic political reasons. Brennan and his wife were moved to Switzerland and he took on the role of Australian Ambassador to Switzerland. Brennan spent seven years living in Berne, representing Australia at several important international law conventions, including the United Nations Convention on the Law of the Sea. While he was resident in Berne, Brennan's wife, Suzanne, whom he had married on 3 April 1945, died on 25 October 1977.

In 1983 Brennan was accepted as a candidate for priesthood by Archbishop of Adelaide James Gleeson.

Brennan died in Adelaide on 16 January 1985.

== Officer of the Order of Australia ==
Brennan was made an Officer of the Order of Australia in the Queen's Birthday 1979 Honours for his public service as a diplomat.

Diplomatic posts
Preceded by R. Bonner	Australian Ambassador to Ireland; 1972–1974	Succeeded by Vince Gair
Preceded by John Rowland	Australian Ambassador to Switzerland; 1974–1981	Succeeded by Pierre Hutton
