= Joanna Hewitt =

Australian public servant

Joanna Hewitt AO
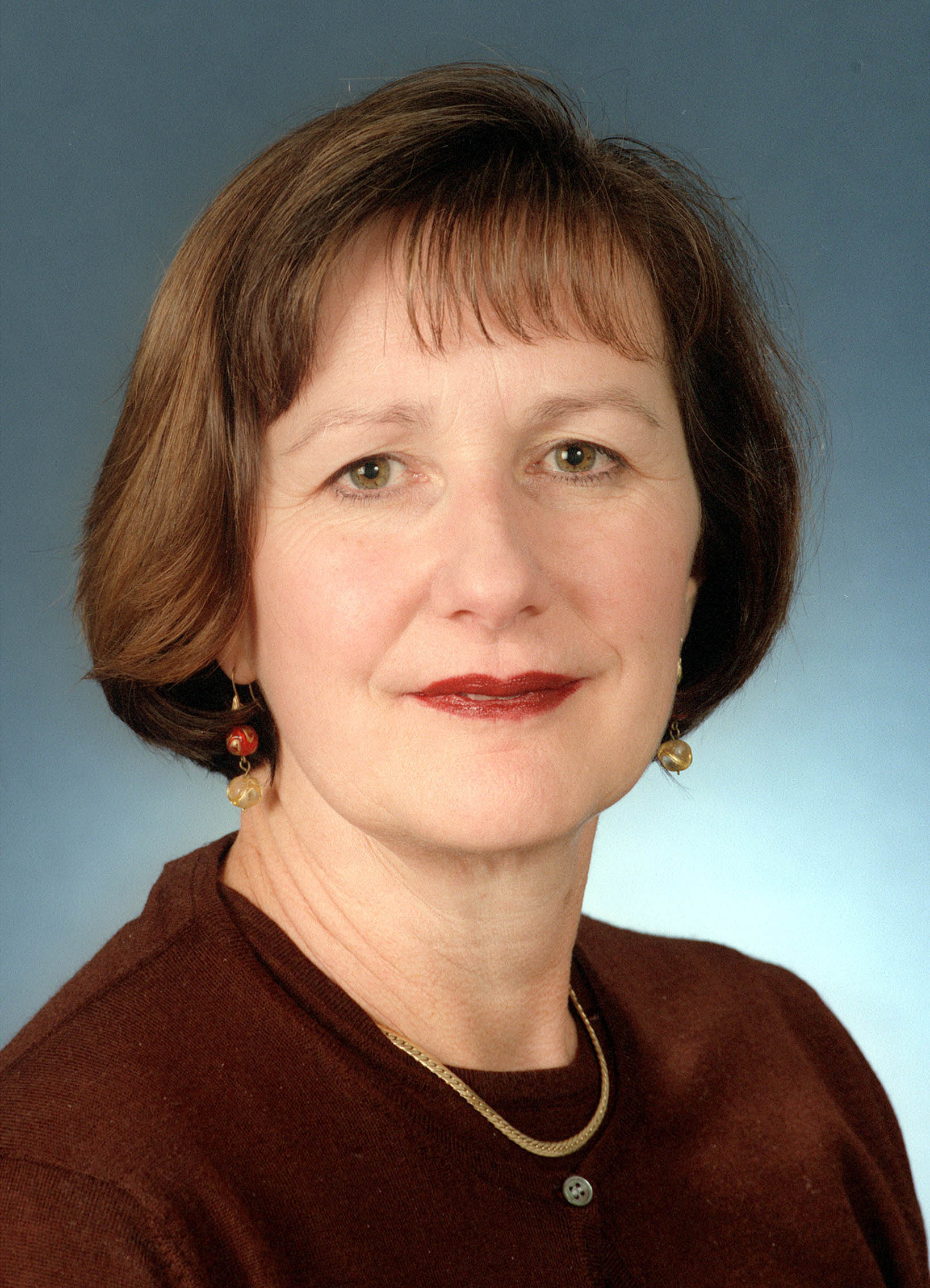

Secretary of the Department of Agriculture, Fisheries and Forestry
- In office 2004–2007

Personal details
- Born: Joanna Miriam Hewitt; 1 May 1949 (age 77) Denmark, Western Australia
- Spouse: Mark Pierce
- Children: Three
- Education: University of Western Australia; London School of Economics
- Occupation: Public servant

Joanna Miriam Hewitt AO (born 1 May 1949) is a former senior Australian public servant and policymaker. She previously served as the Commission Chair of the Australian Centre for International Agricultural Research (ACIAR) from 2011 to 2014.

== Background and early life ==
Joanna Hewitt was born in Denmark, Western Australia on 1 May 1949. She was schooled and raised in rural Western Australia and Perth, going on to study her undergraduate degree at the University of Western Australia. She later earned a master's degree in Economics from the London School of Economics.

== Career ==
Hewitt joined the Australian Public Service in 1972 as a trainee at the Department of Foreign Affairs.

In 1998, she was appointed Australia's Ambassador for Asia-Pacific Economic Cooperation (APEC), the pre-eminent regional forum for economic and trade dialogue.

Between 2000 and 2003 Hewitt was Australia’s Ambassador in Brussels, Belgium, and concurrently ambassador to the European Union and Luxembourg.

In 2004 she was elevated to the position of Secretary of the Department of Agriculture, Fisheries and Forestry. She stayed in the role until 2007, resigning to join her husband in Washington DC who had a posting there.

Hewitt served as the Commission Chair of the Australian Centre for International Agricultural Research from 2011 to 2014.

== Awards and honours ==
Hewitt was made an Officer of the Order of Australia in 2008 for service to the community, particularly through significant contributions to Australia's agricultural, forestry and fishing sectors, to cross departmental policy formulation and delivery, and to international relations through fostering diplomatic, trade and cultural interests'.

In 2012, she was awarded an Honorary Degree of Doctor of Economics from the University of Western Australia.

In late 2016, the Department of Foreign Affairs and Trade named one of its 16 meeting rooms in honour of Hewitt, in recognition of her work as a pioneering female diplomat.

== Additional sources ==
- Hewitt, Joanna (2012), "Chapter 6: Balancing life at home and away in the Australian Public Service", in Wanna, John; Vincent, Sam; Podger, Andrew Stuart (eds.), With the benefit of hindsight: Valedictory reflections from departmental secretaries, 2004–11 (PDF), Canberra, Australia: Australian National University, pp. 51–52, ISBN 9781921862731, archived from the original (PDF) on 5 February 2014
- Malone, Paul (2006), "Chapter 12: Going 'Bush' – Joanna Hewitt, Department of Agriculture, Fisheries and Forestry", Australian department heads under Howard : career paths and practice (PDF), Canberra, Australia: The Australian National University, pp. 77–82, ISBN 1-920942-83-1, archived from the original (PDF) on 6 November 2013

Government offices
Preceded by Mike Taylor	Secretary of the Department of Agriculture, Fisheries and Forestry; 2004 – 2007	Succeeded by Conall O'Connell
Diplomatic posts
Preceded by Donald Kenyon	Australian Ambassador to Belgium; 2000 – 2003	Succeeded by Peter Gray
Preceded by Peter Grey	Australian Ambassador for APEC; 1998– 2000	Succeeded by Pamela Fayle
