= Conall O'Connell =

Australian public servant

Dr Conall O'Connell AM

Secretary of the Department of Agriculture, Fisheries and Forestry
- In office 7 May 2007 – 28 January 2013

Personal details
- Education: Queen's University Belfast
- Occupation: Public servant

Conall O'Connell AM is a senior Australian public servant and policymaker. He is currently an Australian Centre for International Agricultural Research Commissioner.

== Education ==
O'Connell attended Queen's University Belfast, where he studied to attain a Bachelor of Arts (with first class honours) and his doctorate.

== Career ==
Between 1991 and 1997, O'Connell held various positions in the Department of the Prime Minister and Cabinet.

By 2005, he was a Deputy Secretary in the Department of the Environment and Heritage. While in the Environment Department, he was involved in authoring a report on biofuels.

O'Connell was appointed Secretary of the Department of Agriculture, Fisheries and Forestry (DAFF) in May 2007. O'Connell served in the role until January 2013. During his time as Secretary of DAFF, O'Connell oversaw the inaugural G20 agriculture Ministers’ meeting, the eradication of equine influenza in partnership with the equine industry, and achieved a European wine agreement. He also managed the Australian Government suspension of live export trade with Indonesia in 2011, after Four Corners aired shocking footage showing mistreatment of Australian animals in Indonesian abattoirs. The ban impacted Australia's relationship with Indonesia, and O'Connell and his department had to work quickly to implement safeguards to enable trade to Indonesia to resume.

O'Connell is currently a Commissioner at the Australian Centre for International Agricultural Research.

== Awards ==
O'Connell was made a Member of the Order of Australia in 2014 for significant service to public administration and governance, and to Australia's agricultural, forestry and fisheries sectors.

Government offices
Preceded by Joanna Hewitt	Secretary of the Department of Agriculture, Fisheries and Forestry; 2007 – 2013	Succeeded by Andrew Metcalfe
