= Ambassador of Australia to the Association of South East Asian Nations =

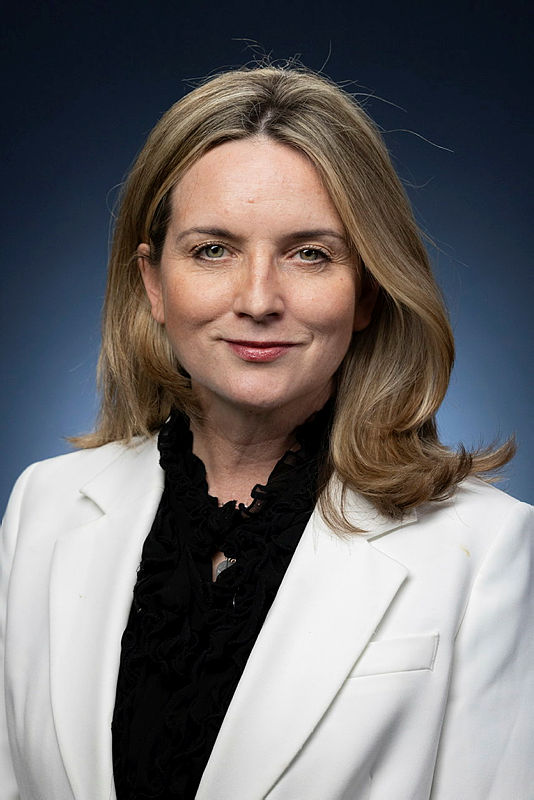
- Incumbent; Tiffany McDonald since 20 January 2024
- Department of Foreign Affairs and Trade
- Style: His Excellency
- Reports to: Minister for Foreign Affairs
- Residence: Jakarta, Indonesia
- Nominator: Prime Minister of Australia
- Appointer: Governor General of Australia
- Inaugural holder: Gillian Bird
- Formation: 5 September 2008
- Website: Australian Mission to ASEAN

The ambassador of Australia to the Association of South East Asian Nations is an officer of the Australian Department of Foreign Affairs and Trade and the head of the delegation of the Commonwealth of Australia to the Association of South East Asian Nations (ASEAN) in Jakarta, Indonesia. Australia has been in involved with ASEAN since 1974, when it became the first Dialogue Partner to ASEAN, with involvement in the East Asia Summit and the ASEAN Regional Forum.

The position has the rank and status of an ambassador extraordinary and plenipotentiary and the present representative is the third resident ambassador to ASEAN based in the Embassy of Australia, Jakarta. However the position has existed since September 2008 when an ambassador resident in Canberra was appointed by Foreign Minister Stephen Smith: "The decision to appoint an Ambassador to ASEAN underscores the importance Australia attaches to ASEAN and our desire to extend Australia's engagement and cooperation with ASEAN and its member nations." The ability for Dialogue partners to appoint Ambassadors to ASEAN only became possible after the completion of the new ASEAN Charter, which was signed in November 2007 and became effective in December 2008.

== List of ambassadors ==
Ordinal	Officeholder	Residency	Term start date	Term end date	Time in office	Notes
1	Gillian Bird	Canberra, Australia	5 September 2008	1 October 2013	5 years, 26 days	
2	Simon Merrifield	Jakarta, Indonesia	1 October 2013	2 August 2016	2 years, 306 days	
3	Jane Duke	Jakarta, Indonesia	2 August 2016	October 2020	4 years, 60 days	
4	Will Nankervis	Jakarta, Indonesia	October 2020	incumbent	5 years, 340 days	
