= Jane Duke =

Australian diplomat

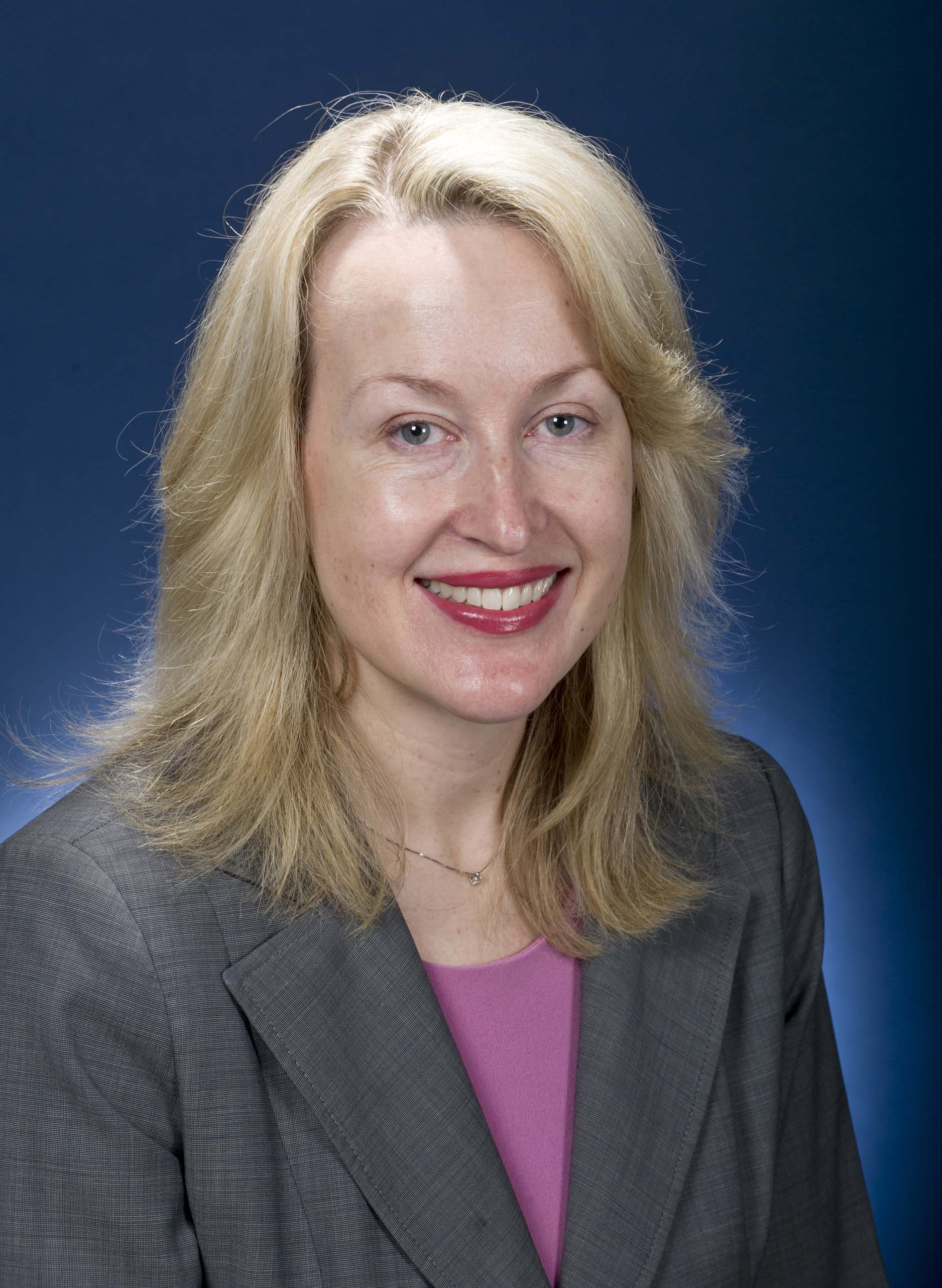
Duke in 2010

Jane Duke is an Australian diplomat who was their Ambassador to ASEAN, beginning in August 2016, and was appointed Australian Consul-General Los Angeles in August 2020.

== Education and career ==
Duke earned a Bachelor of Arts in Asian Studies and a Bachelor of Laws from the Australian National University and a Graduate Diploma in Legal Practice from the University of Technology Sydney.

Duke was an immigration counsellor with Australia's Permanent Mission to the United Nations from 2005 to 2008. She was Australia's Deputy High Commissioner to Malaysia from 2011 to 2014. Between postings she worked at the Department of Foreign Affairs and Trade in Canberra.
