= 2000 Australian Royal Visit Honours =

The 2000 Australian Royal Visit Honours for Australia were announced on 5 May 2000.

== Royal Victorian Order ==
=== Commander of the Royal Victorian Order (CVO) ===
- His Excellency the Honourable Gordon Samuels, AC, QC
- His Excellency the Honourable Sir James Gobbo, AC, QC
- His Excellency the Honourable Sir Guy Green, AC, KBE
- His Excellency Major General Michael Jeffery, AC, MC
- Roger Thomas Bagley, LVO

=== Lieutenant of the Royal Victorian Order (LVO) ===
- Commander Clifford Donald Lonsdale, OAM
- Martin Charles Brian Bonsey
- Patricia Jane Logan, MVO
- Kevin Leslie Skipworth

=== Member of the Royal Victorian Order (MVO) ===
- Paul Francis Morrison
- Kevin James Davidson
- Malveen Kelly
- Fiona Mary Birkett
- Kaye Elizabeth Robertson
- Lieutenant Colonel Richard Burr
- Dale Keady

== Royal Victorian Medal (RVM) ==
=== Gold ===
- James Heenan, RVM

=== Silver ===
- Andrew John Newland
