= Pamela J. Fayle =

Australian diplomat

Pamela J. Fayle AM (born 21 October 1954 in Tamworth, New South Wales) was the Australian Ambassador to Germany from 2003 until 2006 with non-resident accreditation to Switzerland and Liechtenstein. She also served as the ambassador to the Asia-Pacific Economic Cooperation from 2000 until 2002.

Fayle studied economics and Asian studies at the Australian National University.

Fayle was appointed a Member of the Order of Australia in the 2019 Australia Day Honours.
