= Gillian Bird =

Australian public servant and diplomat

Her Excellency Gillian Bird PSM
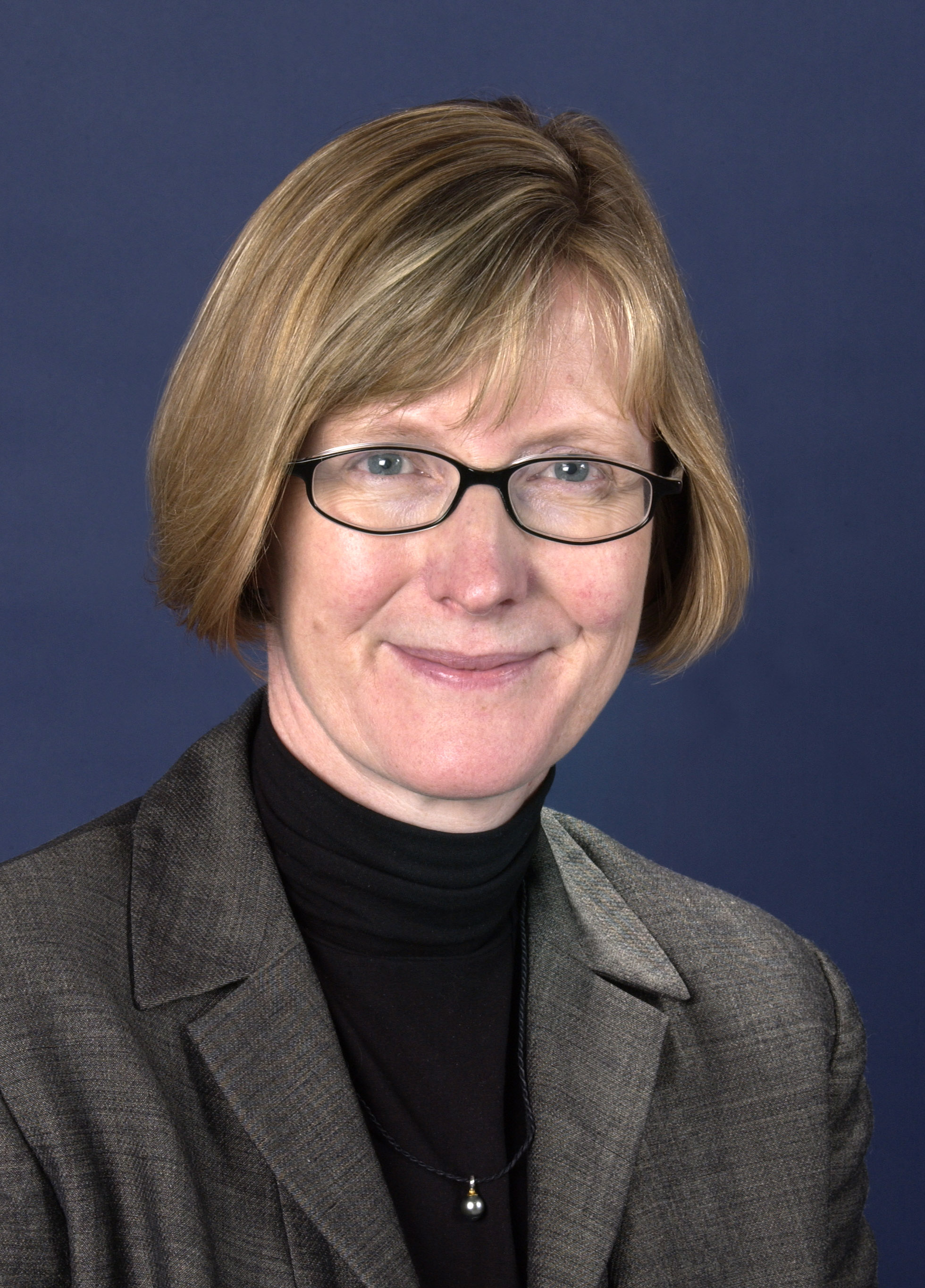
- Gillian Bird in 2004

Ambassador of Australia to Vietnam
- Incumbent
- Assumed office 24 April 2025
- Prime Minister: Anthony Albanese
- Preceded by: Andrew Goledzinowski

Ambassador of Australia to France
- In office 5 November 2020 – 12 December 2024
- Prime Minister: Scott Morrison; Anthony Albanese
- Preceded by: Brendan Berne
- Succeeded by: Lynette Wood

Permanent Representative of Australia to the United Nations
- In office February 2015 – 17 October 2019
- Prime Minister: Tony Abbott; Malcolm Turnbull; Scott Morrison
- Preceded by: Gary Quinlan
- Succeeded by: Mitch Fifield

Ambassador of Australia to the Association of South East Asian Nations
- In office 5 September 2008 – 1 October 2013
- Prime Minister: Kevin Rudd; Julia Gillard; Tony Abbott
- Preceded by: Position created
- Succeeded by: Simon Merrifield

Personal details
- Born: Gillian Elizabeth Bird; June 1957 (age 69) Adelaide, Australia
- Education: University of Sydney; École nationale d'administration

Gillian Elizabeth Bird (born in Adelaide) is an Australian civil servant and diplomat who is the current ambassador to Vietnam since 2025. She served as the Australia's Ambassador to France from 2020 to 2024. Bird concurrently served as Australia's non-resident Ambassador to Algeria, Mauritania, and Monaco. She is a former Permanent Representative of Australia to the United Nations, serving between 2015 and 2019.

== Education ==
Bird graduated from the University of Sydney with a Bachelor of Arts (First Class Honours) and later studied at the École nationale d'administration.

== Career ==
Bird joined the Department of Foreign Affairs in 1980, and from 1980 to 1983 was based in Paris where she was a representative of the Australian government to the OECD. From 1986 until 1987 Bird served at the Australian embassy in Harare, Zimbabwe, and from 1990 until 1993 at the Permanent Mission of Australia to the United Nations in New York City.

Bird returned to Australia in 1993 and was appointed Assistant Secretary in the Executive Branch of the foreign ministry, and from 1994 to 1997 was Assistant Secretary in the Peace, Arms Control and Disarmament Branch. From 1997 to 1999 Bird was First Assistant Secretary in International Organisations and Legal Division, and from 1999 to 2002 she was First Assistant Secretary in the South and South-East Asia Division.

After a stint as Head of the Foreign and Trade Policy White Paper Task Force of the Australian foreign department, in 2002 she was appointed as First Assistant Secretary in the International Division of Department of the Prime Minister and Cabinet. She held this position until 2004, when she was appointed Deputy Secretary in the Executive Branch of the Department of Foreign Affairs and Trade.

Concurrent to this role, in 2008 Bird was appointed as Australia's first Ambassador to the Association of Southeast Asian Nations by Stephen Smith, then-Foreign Minister of Australia. Australia became the first ASEAN dialogue partner in 1974, and Bird's appointment enabled Australia to continue friendly relations with the regional bloc, whilst also giving it a voice in helping to solve regional issues.

On 11 June 2014, Australian Prime Minister Tony Abbott appointed Bird as Permanent Representative of Australia to the United Nations. Bird was appointed in February 2015, replacing Gary Quinlan, and presented her credentials to the UN Secretary‑General Ban Ki-moon on 17 February 2015. Her term expired in October 2019 and she was replaced by former Senator Mitch Fifield.

In November 2020, she was appointed as the new Australian Ambassador to France, Algeria, Mauritania and Monaco, replacing Brendan Berne who occupied the post since 2017. Bird presented her credentials to the Director of State Protocol and Diplomatic Events at the French Ministry for Europe and Foreign Affairs, on 5 November 2020.

== Affidavit in NPA agent corruption case ==
In July 2014 news sites outside of Australia reported that an unprecedented suppression order was issued by the Supreme Court of Victoria for an affidavit from Bird relating to allegations that Securency and Note Printing Australia (NPA) agents had made bribes totalling million of dollars for the purposes of securing contracts to manufacture polymer banknotes to Malaysia, Vietnam, Indonesia, and other countries. A copy of the order published by Wikileaks, reportedly showed that Bird's affidavit and the very fact that the suppression order existed, was suppressed on national security grounds throughout Australian media.

== Awards ==
In 2012 Bird was awarded the Public Service Medal for her service over a sustained period, contributing significantly to advancing key priorities of successive Australian Governments in the field of international relations and delivery of consular services. According to award documents, Bird has also displayed outstanding service in the Department’s consular response overseeing incidents ranging from major evacuations of Australians in conflict zones to high-profile individual consular cases. She also played key roles in advancing the bilateral relations with key Association of South East Asian Nations countries which is of fundamental importance to Australian national interests. Bird is an exemplar of the best traditions of the Australian public service and has delivered outcomes of long-lasting importance for Australia.

Diplomatic posts
Preceded by Gary Quinlan	Permanent Representative of Australia to the United Nations; 2015–2019	Succeeded by Mitch Fifield
Preceded by Brendan Berne	Australian Ambassador to France; 2020–2024	Succeeded by Lynette Wood
