= List of ambassadors of Australia to Switzerland =

Ambassador of Australia to Switzerland

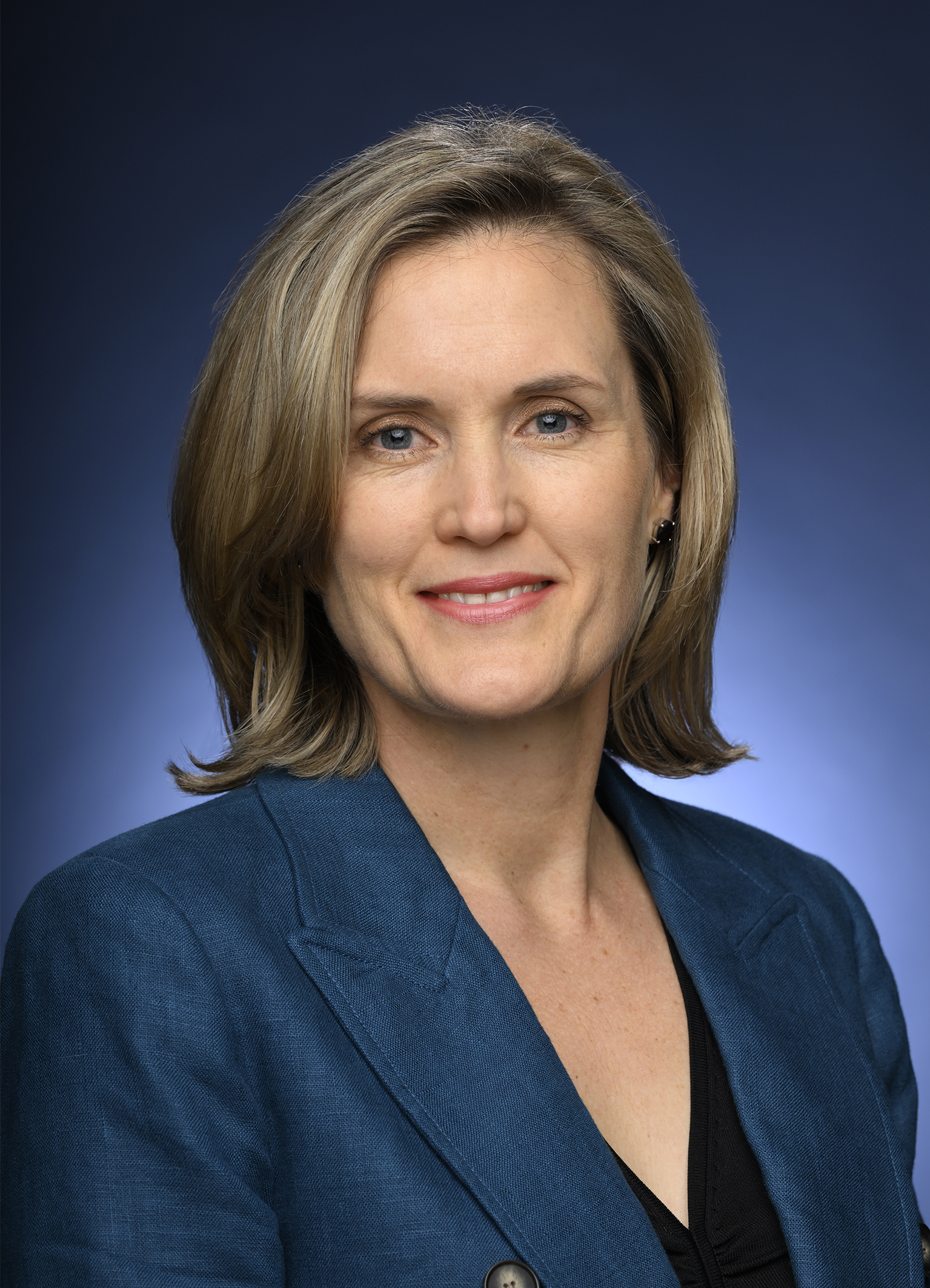
- Incumbent; Elizabeth Day since 22 November 2022
- Department of Foreign Affairs and Trade
- Style: Her Excellency
- Reports to: Minister for Foreign Affairs
- Residence: Bern
- Nominator: Prime Minister of Australia
- Appointer: Governor General of Australia
- Inaugural holder: Malcolm Morris (resident in Vienna)
- Formation: 28 August 1968
- Website: Australian Embassy in Bern and the Australian Permanent Mission and Consulate-General in Geneva

The ambassador of Australia to Switzerland is an officer of the Australian Department of Foreign Affairs and Trade and the head of the Embassy of the Commonwealth of Australia to the Swiss Confederation. The ambassador has the rank and status of an ambassador extraordinary and plenipotentiary and also holds non-resident accreditation for Liechtenstein (since 2022). From 1974 to 1993 and since November 2022 there has been a resident ambassador in Bern. The current ambassador since 22 November 2022 is Elizabeth Day.

== Heads of mission ==
#	Officeholder	Other offices	Residency	Term start date	Term end date	Time in office	Notes
1	Malcolm Morris	N/A	Vienna, Austria	28 August 1968	1970	1–2 years	
2	Lawrence Corkery	N/A	Vienna, Austria	1970	1972	1–2 years	
3	John Rowland	N/A	Vienna, Austria	1972	1974	1–2 years	
4	Keith Brennan	N/A	Bern, Switzerland	September 1974	August 1981	6 years, 11 months	
5	Pierre Hutton	N/A	Bern, Switzerland	August 1981	October 1985	4 years, 2 months	
6	Douglas Townsend	N/A	Bern, Switzerland	October 1985	October 1988	3 years	
7	John Brook	N/A	Bern, Switzerland	October 1988	December 1991	3 years, 2 months	
–	William Jackson (Chargé d'Affaires)	N/A	Bern, Switzerland	December 1991	January 1993	1 year, 1 month	
8	John Bowan	N/A	Bonn, Germany	January 1993	December 1994	1 year, 11 months	
9	Max Hughes	N/A	Bonn, Germany	December 1994	April 1999	4 years, 4 months	
10	Paul O'Sullivan	^{A}	Bonn, Germany	April 1999	17 August 1999	3 years, 9 months	
10	Paul O'Sullivan	^{A}	Berlin, Germany	17 August 1999	March 2003	3 years, 9 months	
11	Pamela J. Fayle	^{A}	Berlin, Germany	March 2003	April 2006	3 years, 1 month	
12	Ian Kemish	^{A}	Berlin, Germany	April 2006	24 August 2009	3 years, 4 months	
13	Peter Tesch	^{A}	Berlin, Germany	24 August 2009	24 October 2013	4 years, 61 days	
14	David Ritchie	^{A}	Berlin, Germany	24 October 2013	26 August 2016	2 years, 307 days	
15	Lynette Wood	^{A}	Berlin, Germany	26 August 2016	20 October 2020	4 years, 55 days	
16	Philip Green	^{A}	Berlin, Germany	11 November 2020	22 November 2022	2 years, 11 days	
17	Elizabeth Day	^{A}	Bern, Switzerland	22 November 2022	Incumbent	3 years, 289 days	

=== Notes ===
^A Also non-resident Ambassador to the Principality of Liechtenstein, 1999–2022 (Bonn/Berlin), 2022–date (Bern).
