= Tom Warren White =

Australian soldier and businessman

- Born: 28 November 1902; Brisbane, Queensland
- Died: 14 June 1993 (aged 90)
- Burial place: Tamborine Mountain Cemetery, Tamborine Mountain, Queensland
- Military career
- Allegiance: Australia
- Branch: Australian Army
- Service years: 1924–1957
- Rank: Brigadier
- Service number: VX20316
- Commands: 2/1st Battalion
- Conflicts: Second World War
- Awards: Lieutenant of the Royal Victorian Order; Officer of the Legion of Merit (United States)

Brigadier Tom Warren White, LVO (28 November 1902 – 14 June 1993) was an Australian soldier who served during the Second World War.

== Early life ==
Tom was born in Brisbane, Queensland on 28 November 1902, the third son of John Warren White and Elizabeth Matilda Rosa Georgina née Barker. He was commissioned as a lieutenant in the Australian Army Staff Corps in 1924. He was seconded to the Royal Scots Greys (2nd Dragoons) between 1926 and 1927 in India and attended the Staff College, Camberley from 1937 to 1940. Tom was attached to the British War Office in 1939 and served with the British forces in France in 1940.

== Second World War ==
With Japan's entry into the war in December 1941, the 2/1st Battalion was ordered to return to Australia from the Middle East. White had been appointed as commanding officer. Whilst en route, the battalion was diverted to Ceylon to defend it from a possible Japanese invasion. The invasion never eventuated and the battalion finally arrived home in August 1942.

== Later life ==
He was appointed the representative of the Australian military mission of the Allied Control Council for Germany, in Berlin in 1945. He was awarded the Officer of the Legion of Merit by the United States for "invaluable assistance in the preparation of plans affecting Australian and combined forces in the South-west Pacific area from 1943 to 1945".
