= Lynette Wood =

Australian diplomat

Her Excellency Lynette Wood
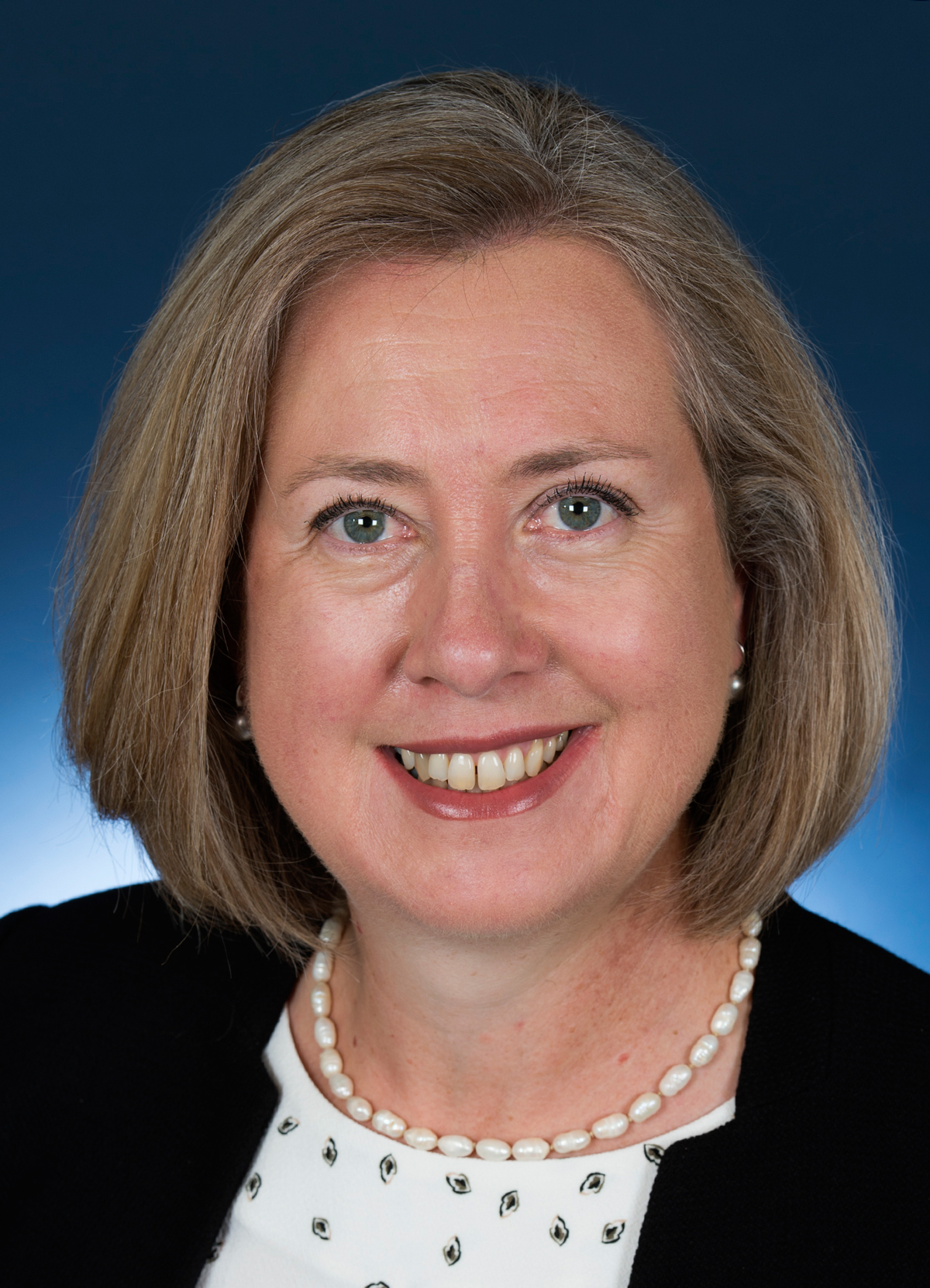

Australian Ambassador to France
- Incumbent
- Assumed office 13 December 2024
- Preceded by: Gillian Bird

Ambassador of Australia to Germany
- In office September 2016 – 2020
- Preceded by: David Ritchie
- Succeeded by: Philip Green

Ambassador of Australia to Switzerland
- In office September 2016 – 2020
- Preceded by: David Ritchie
- Succeeded by: Philip Green

Personal details
- Education: University of Sydney; Monash University; Australian National University
- Occupation: Diplomat

Lynette Wood is an Australian diplomat who served as Acting High Commissioner and Chargé d’Affaires to the Australian High Commission in the United Kingdom from May 2022 to January 2023. She held the position of Australian Ambassador to Switzerland, Germany and Liechtenstein from September 2016 to 2020. She succeeded David Ritchie and was replaced by Philip Green. In May 2022, Wood was appointed as Acting Australian High Commissioner to the United Kingdom. In September 2022, it was announced that Stephen Smith would succeed Wood as High Commissioner.

In October 2024, Wood's appointment to the role of Ambassador to France was announced, replacing Gillian Bird. As Ambassador to France, Wood is also accredited to the People's Democratic Republic of Algeria, the Islamic Republic of Mauritania and the Principality of Monaco.

Wood graduated with a Master of Arts (International Relations) from the Australian National University, a Graduate Diploma in Foreign Affairs and Trade from Monash University, and a Bachelor of Arts (Honours) from the University of Sydney.

Diplomatic posts
Preceded by David Ritchie	Ambassador of Australia to Germany; 2016–2020	Succeeded by Philip Green
Preceded by David Ritchie	Ambassador of Australia to Switzerland; 2016–2020	Succeeded by Philip Green
Preceded by George Brandis	Acting; Australian High Commissioner to the United Kingdom; 2022–2023	Succeeded by Stephen Smith as High Commissioner
