= List of ambassadors of Australia to France =

Ambassador of Australia to France

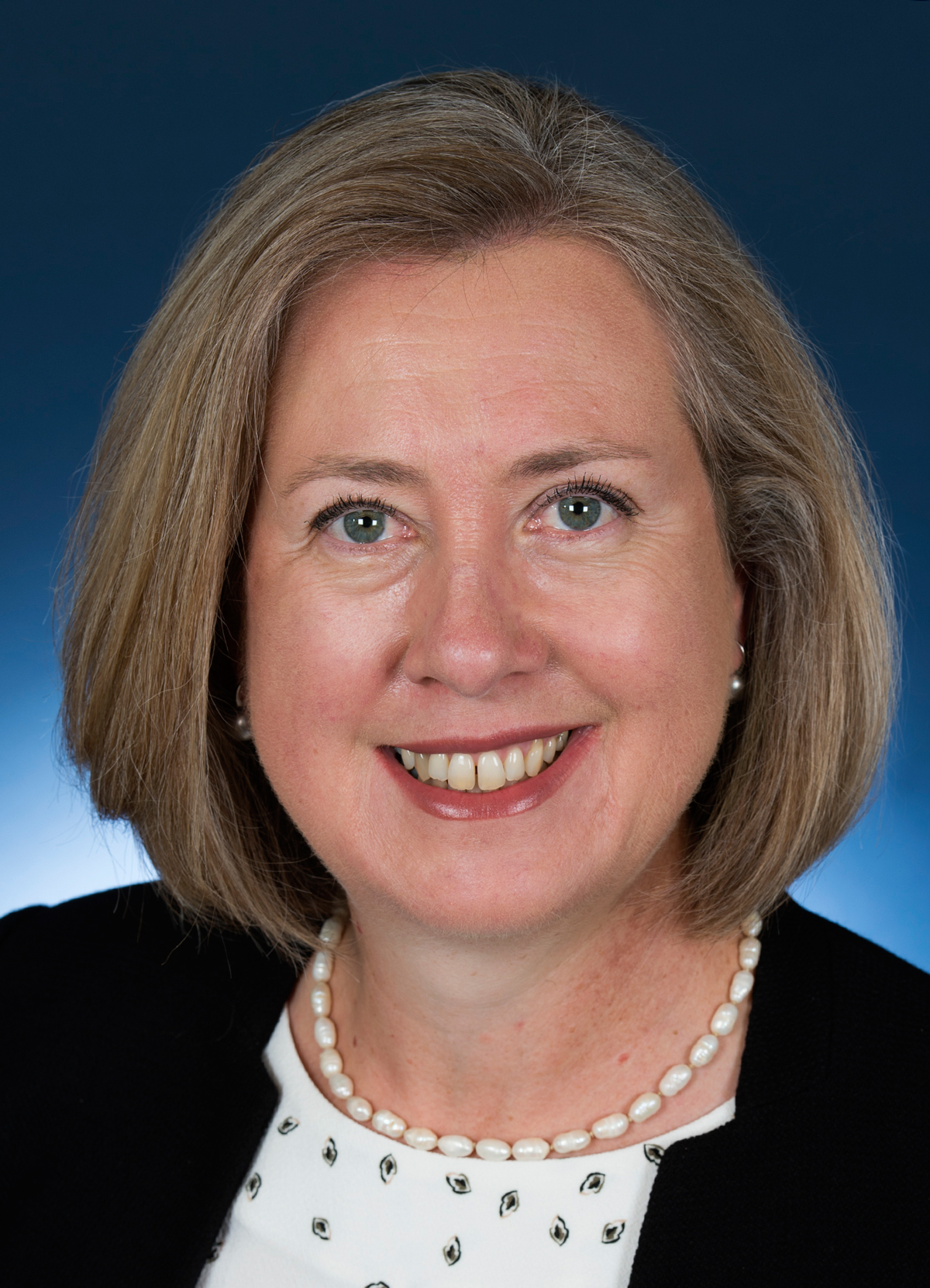
- Incumbent; Lynette Wood since 13 December 2024
- Department of Foreign Affairs and Trade
- Style: Her Excellency
- Reports to: Minister for Foreign Affairs
- Nominator: Prime Minister of Australia
- Appointer: Governor General of Australia
- Inaugural holder: Colonel William Hodgson OBE
- Formation: 11 March 1945
- Website: Australian Embassy, France

The ambassador of Australia to France is an officer of the Australian Department of Foreign Affairs and Trade and the head of the Embassy of the Commonwealth of Australia to the French Republic. The position has the rank and status of an ambassador extraordinary and plenipotentiary and holds non-resident accreditation for Algeria, Mauritania (since 2001), Monaco. From April 1976 to March 1991 there was a resident ambassador in Algeria and has since been held by the ambassador, excepting a period from 1999–2002 when it was held by the ambassador in Cairo. From October 1972 – August 1975, October 1976 – August 1978, January 1988 – September 1990, and March 1994 – September 1996 the Ambassador served as Permanent Delegate of Australia to UNESCO, a role that is now held by the Deputy Head of Mission. The Deputy Head also serves as the non-resident accredited Ambassador to Chad. From 1978 to 2017, the ambassador had responsibility for relations with Morocco until the establishment of a resident embassy in Rabat.

Gillian Bird PSM was appointed ambassador in November 2020. France and Australia have had official diplomatic relations since Australia opened its Legation in Paris in 1945. The Legation was upgraded to Embassy status in 1948, when Colonel William Hodgson, who served as Minister to France, was appointed as Ambassador.

== List of officeholders ==
The first official representative of Australia in France was Clive H. Voss, who was appointed as a commercial agent in Paris in 1919. His appointment was made on the personal initiative of Prime Minister Billy Hughes, in line with his attempts to establish a system of trade commissioners. Voss established an office in the premises of the British Chamber of Commerce in Paris and was subordinate to the Australian High Commissioner to the United Kingdom. Despite criticism of his effectiveness, he remained in the position until the Fall of France in 1940 and "helped establish the idea of a distinct Australian official representation in France as a norm".

=== Minister and ambassadors to France ===
Ordinal	Officeholder	Title	Other offices	Term start date	Term end date	Time in office	Notes
1	Colonel William Hodgson OBE	Minister to France		11 March 1945	1948	4 years, 7 months	
1	Colonel William Hodgson OBE	Ambassador of Australia to France		1948	November 1949	4 years, 7 months	
2	Sir Keith Officer OBE, MC	Ambassador of Australia to France		18 April 1950	1955	4–5 years	
3	Alfred Stirling CBE	Ambassador of Australia to France		1955	1959	3–4 years	
4	Sir Edward Ronald Walker CBE	Ambassador of Australia to France		1969	1968	8–9 years	
5	Alan Renouf OBE	Ambassador of Australia to France	^{C}	1969	1973	3–4 years	
6	Harold David Anderson	Ambassador of Australia to France	^{C}	1973	1978	4–5 years	
7	John Rowland AO	Ambassador of Australia to France	^{E}	1978	1982	3–4 years	
8	Peter Curtis	Ambassador of Australia to France	^{E}	1982	1987	4–5 years	
9	Ted Pocock AM	Ambassador of Australia to France	^{C}^{E}	1987	1991	3–4 years	
10	Clive Jones	Ambassador of Australia to France	^{A}^{E}	1991	1993	1–2 years	
11	Alan Brown	Ambassador of Australia to France	^{A}^{C}^{E}	1993	1996	2–3 years	
12	John Spender KC	Ambassador of Australia to France	^{A}^{E}	1996	2000	3–4 years	
13	Bill Fisher	Ambassador of Australia to France	^{B}^{E}	2000	2005	4–5 years	
14	Penny Wensley AO	Ambassador of Australia to France	^{B}^{D}^{E}	2005	2008	2–3 years	
15	David Ritchie AO	Ambassador of Australia to France	^{B}^{D}	2008	2011	2–3 years	
16	Ric Wells	Ambassador of Australia to France	^{B}^{D}	2011	2014	2–3 years	
17	Stephen Brady AO, CVO	Ambassador of Australia to France	^{A}^{B}^{D}	31 March 2014	21 July 2017	3 years, 112 days	
18	Brendan Berne	Ambassador of Australia to France	^{A}^{B}^{D}	21 July 2017	October 2020	3 years, 2 months	
19	Gillian Bird PSM	Ambassador of Australia to France	^{A}^{B}^{D}	5 November 2020	12 December 2024	4 years, 37 days	
20	Lynette Wood	Ambassador of Australia to France	^{A}^{B}^{D}	13 December 2024	incumbent	1 year, 336 days	

=== Notes ===
A. Also non-resident Ambassador to the People's Democratic Republic of Algeria, 1991–2000, 2014–present.
B. Also non-resident Ambassador to the Islamic Republic of Mauritania, 2001–present.
C. Also Permanent Delegate of Australia to UNESCO, October 1972–August 1975, October 1976–August 1978, January 1988–September 1990, and March 1994–September 1996.
D. Also non-resident Ambassador to the Principality of Monaco, 3 May 2007–present.
E. Also non-resident Ambassador to the Kingdom of Morocco, 1978–2007.

== See also ==
- France–Australia relations
- Australia–Morocco relations
- Foreign relations of Australia
