= David Ritchie (diplomat) =

Australian diplomat (born 1955)

The Honourable David Ritchie AO
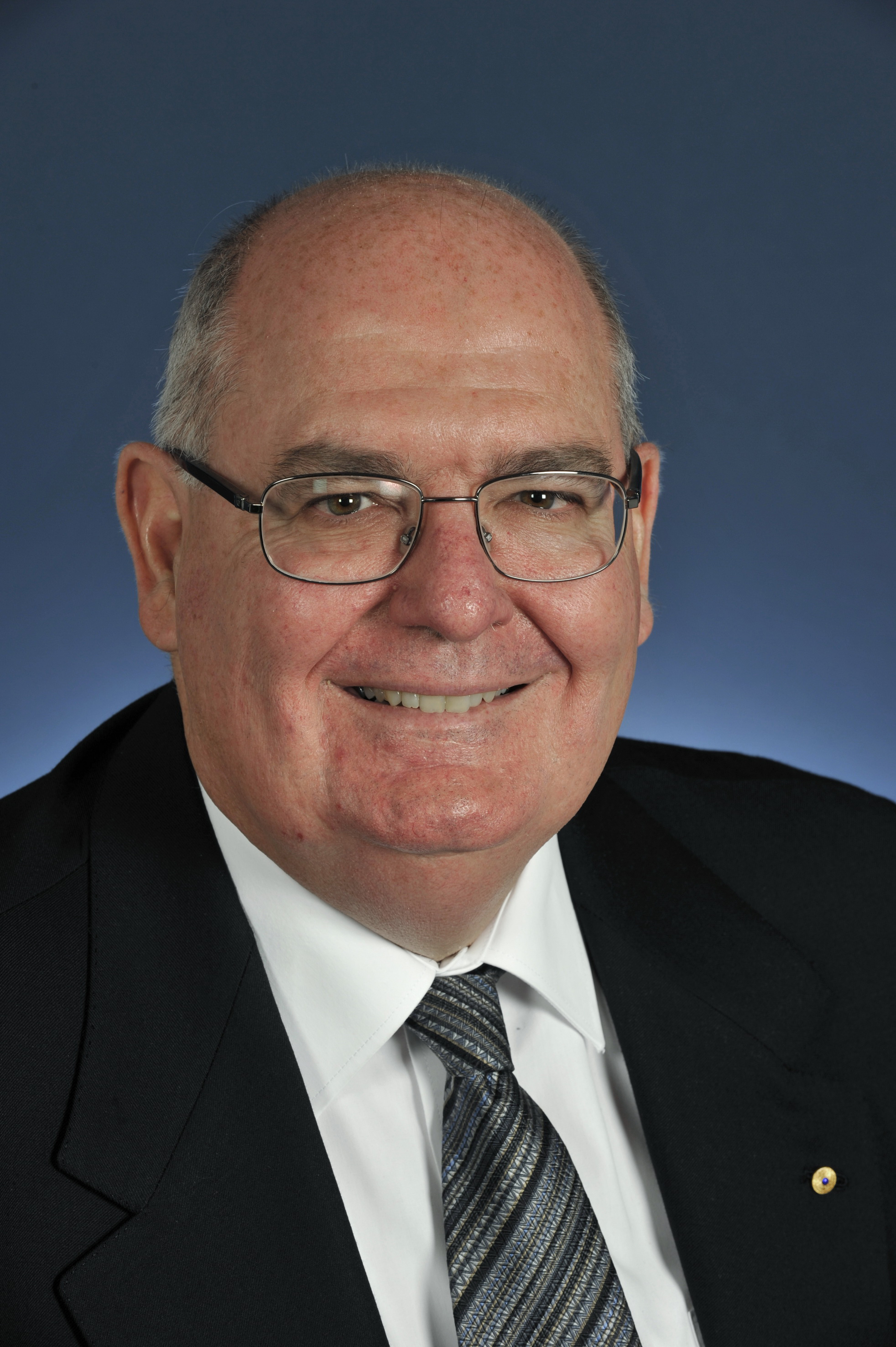
- David Ritchie in 2013
- Occupations: Diplomat, public servant
- Years active: since 1975

David James Ritchie AO (born 20 June 1953) is an Australian diplomat and a senior career officer with the Department of Foreign Affairs and Trade (DFAT). His last appointment was as Ambassador for Australia to Germany, a post to which he was appointed in 2013.

== Early life ==
Ritchie holds a Bachelor of Arts (Honours) degree from the University of Queensland in German language and literature, which he obtained in 1975.

== Diplomatic career ==
Between 1992 and 1997, Ritchie held various positions in the Department of the Prime Minister and Cabinet.

In 2002, Ritchie was appointed as chargé d'affaires at the Australian Embassy in Jakarta until a replacement for Ric Smith was appointed. Some saw David Irvine as a good replacement for Smith, given his knowledge of the Indonesian language, but Ritchie was appointed as the Ambassador of Australia to Indonesia by the Australian government to oversee the relationship between the two countries, which is seen as one of the most complex. He served in this position until 2005, including at the time of the 2004 Australian Embassy bombing in Jakarta, and the 2005 Bali bombings. For his work at this time, Ritchie was awarded the Group Bravery Citation on 29 August 2005 and made an Officer of the Order of Australia (AO) on 13 June 2005 for "service to ensuring Australia's long-term security interests in the region through efforts to gain co-operative action to address the threat of terrorism."

On 10 May 2010, Ritchie was appointed as Ambassador of Australia to Italy, with concurrent accreditation to San Marino. He took up the post in mid-July that year, and remained in the position until November 2013.

On 24 October 2013, Ritchie was appointed as Ambassador of Australia to Germany, with concurrent accreditation to Liechtenstein and Switzerland. In July 2016, Ritchie was awarded with the Commander's Cross of the Order of Merit of the Federal Republic of Germany by Minister of State in the Foreign Office, Maria Böhmer.

Diplomatic posts
Preceded by Ric Smith	Ambassador of Australia to Indonesia; 2003 – 2005	Succeeded by Bill Farmer
Preceded by Penny Wensley	Australian Ambassador to France; 2008–2011	Succeeded by Ric Wells
Preceded by Amanda Vanstone	Ambassador of Australia to Italy; 2010–2013	Succeeded by Mike Rann
Preceded by Peter Tesch	Ambassador of Australia to Germany; Ambassador of Australia to Switzerland; 2013–2016	Succeeded by Lynette Wood
