= Brendan Berne =

Australian public servant and diplomat

His Excellency Brendan Berne
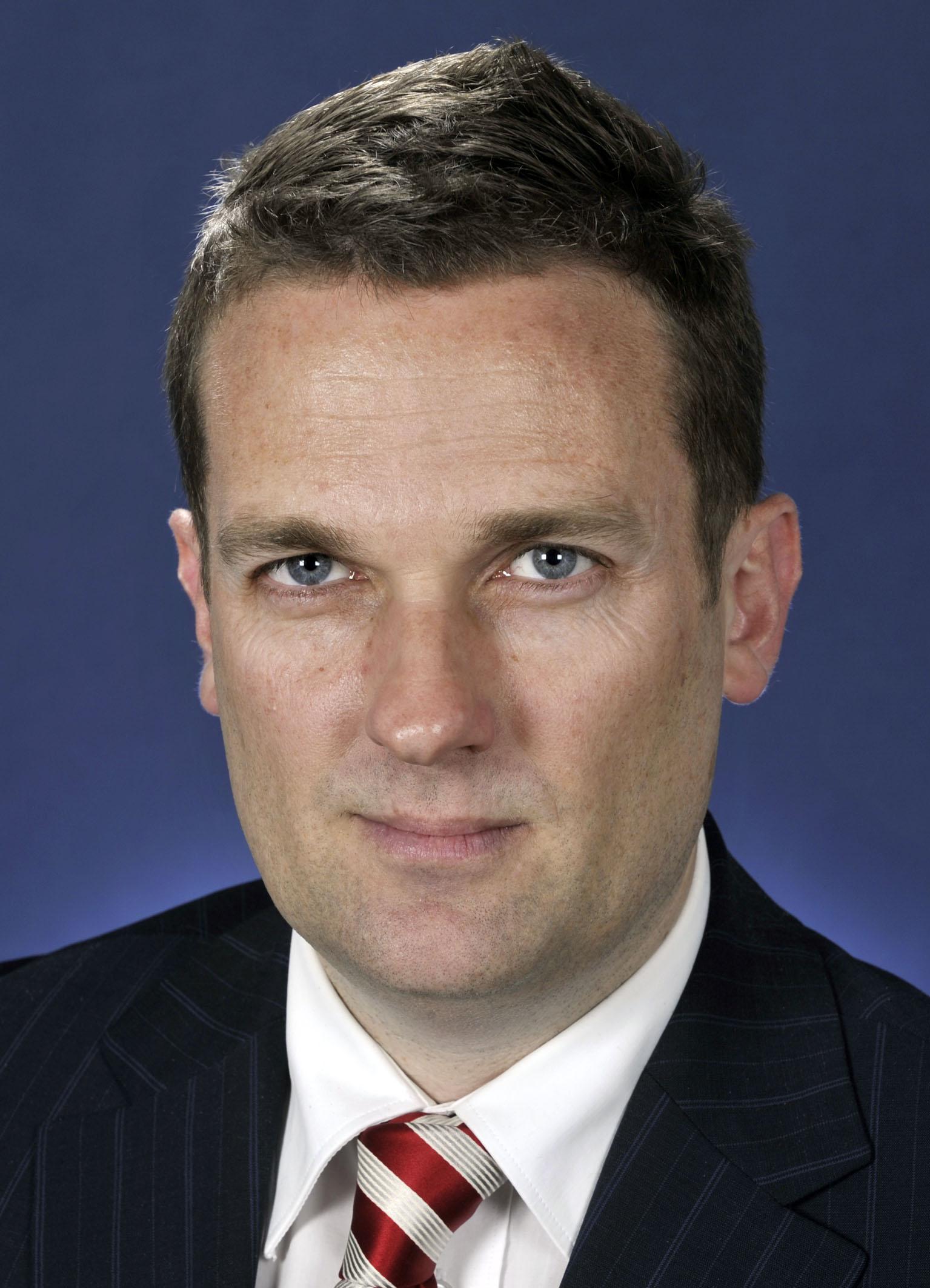

Australian Ambassador to France
- In office 21 July 2017 – October 2020
- Preceded by: Stephen Brady
- Succeeded by: Gillian Bird

Australian Ambassador for Asia-Pacific Economic Cooperation
- In office 5 August 2015 – 22 March 2017
- Preceded by: Sam Gerovich
- Succeeded by: Simon Newnham

Personal details
- Education: Model Farms

Brendan Berne is an Australian civil servant and diplomat who served as the Australian Ambassador to France, Algeria, Mauritania, and Monaco between July 2017 to October 2020.

He previously served as Chief of Staff for the Minister for Trade, Tourism and Investment. His career has spanned postings within the Department of Foreign Affairs and Trade, and the Reserve Bank of Australia. In December 2017, following the legalisation of same-sex marriage in Australia, he proposed to his partner of 11 years. A video of the proposal went viral in France.

He retired from the Department of Foreign Affairs and Trade following his post as Australian Ambassador to France and is writing a TV comedy about the diplomatic circuit described as “In the Thick of It in a safari suit”. The program is scheduled for release in December 2026.

Berne is also working on a cello concerto together with composer Matthew Hindson and the Sydney Symphony Orchestra (SSO) about the story of a 14-year old French cabin boy, who stranded in Cape York in the 1850s.

Diplomatic posts
Preceded by Sam Gerovich	Australian Ambassador for APEC; 2015–2017	Succeeded by Simon Newnham
Preceded by Stephen Brady	Australian Ambassador to France; 2017–2020	Succeeded by Gillian Bird
