= Ric Wells =

Australian diplomat and senior public servant

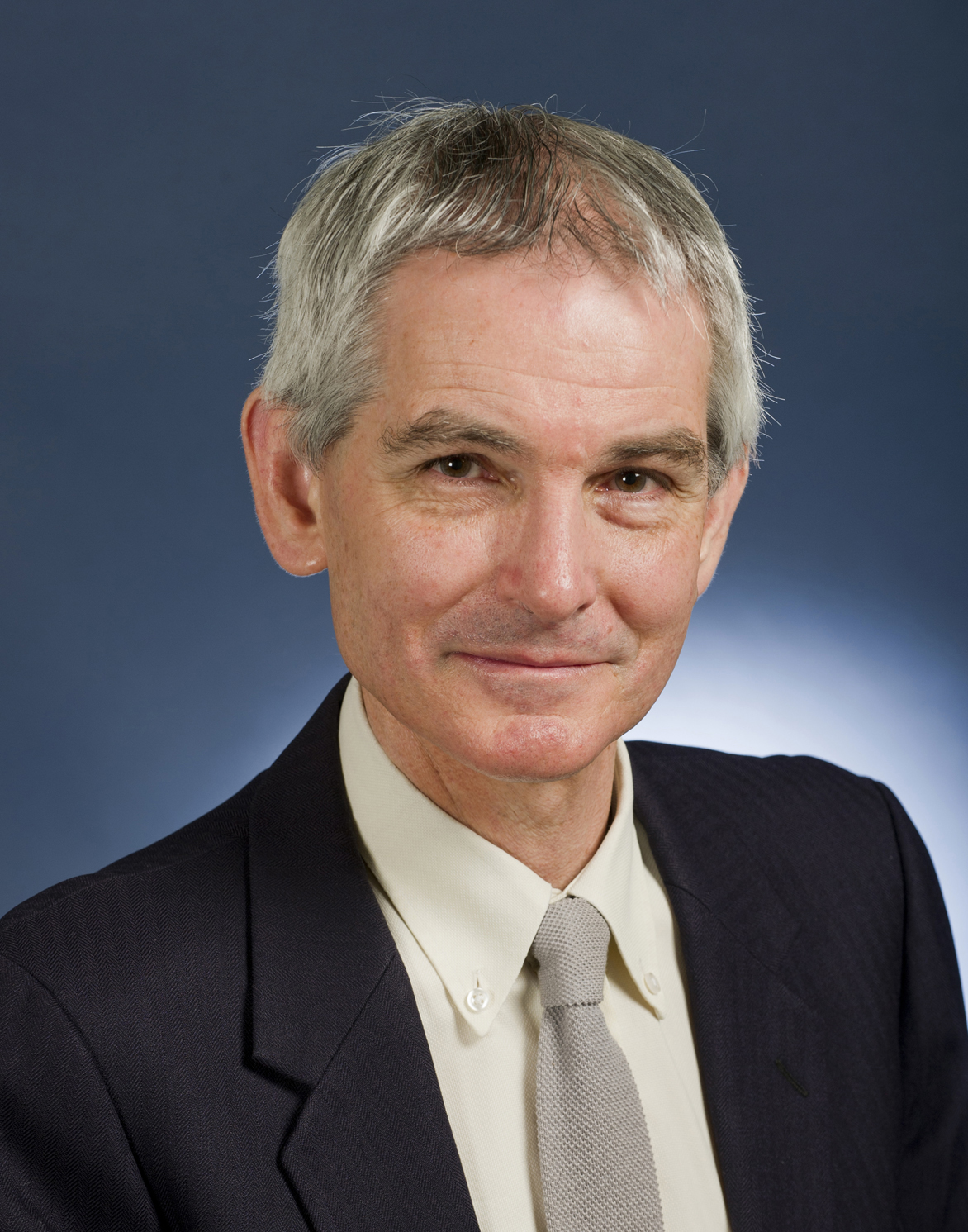

Australian Ambassador to France
- In office 2012–2014
- Preceded by: David Ritchie
- Succeeded by: Stephen Brady

Personal details
- Born: 20 October 1955 (age 71) Sydney, Australia
- Spouse: Erica Wells
- Education: Newington College
- Alma mater: University of Sydney
- Occupation: Senior public servant with Department of Foreign Affairs and Trade
- Profession: Diplomat

Ric Lawson Wells (born 20 October 1955) is an Australian former diplomat and senior public servant with the Department of Foreign Affairs and Trade (DFAT). Wells' senior postings included Australia’s Ambassador to France from 2011 until 2014 and two terms as Deputy Secretary of DFAT.

== Early life and education ==
Wells was born in Sydney and attended Newington College (1968–1973). In his first year at Newington he shared the B S Tame Prize as one of two duces of First Form and again was co-dux in 1971 when he shared the Stretton Waterhouse Memorial Prize in Fourth Form. At the end of 1972 he was Proxime accessit in the Fifth Form and was awarded one of three Wigram Allen Scholarships. In his final year, in 1973, Wells shared the George Lane Prize as Proxime accesserunt and was also awarded the Richard Thompson Memorial Prize for Debating. At the University of Sydney he graduated as a Bachelor of Arts with First Class Honours in 1978.

== Career ==
After commencing employment with DFAT, Wells had postings to Cairo (1982-1985) and Jakarta (1987-1989). He was Assistant Secretary, Services and Intellectual Property Branch (1994-1995) and was Deputy Head of the Australian Mission to the World Trade Organization in Geneva (1995-1999). Wells served as an Assistant Secretary in the Trade Policy and Industrials Branch during 1999. From 2000 until 2002 he was an Assistant Secretary of the Asia, Americas and Trade Branch in the Department of the Prime Minister and Cabinet. During 2002 he headed the White Paper Task Force And in the following year was appointed the First Assistant Secretary of the South Pacific, Africa and Middle East Division.

Between 2005 and 2009, Wells was the Head of the China Free Trade Agreement Task Force, the Head of the Japan Free Trade Agreement Task Force, and the Head of the Korea Free Trade Agreement Task Force. In May 2007 Wells told Australian politicians that the agreement was progressing slowly because "the Chinese Government doesn't want an FTA". The China–Australia Free Trade Agreement was signed in 2015.

In the years before his appointment as Ambassador to France, Wells was both the Deputy Secretary of DFAT and Australia’s Ambassador to the Asia Pacific Economic Cooperation group. Upon his return to Australia in 2014, Wells again served as Deputy Secretary of DFAT and, in 2016, conjointly held the role of Special Representative for Afghanistan and Pakistan.

Diplomatic posts
| Preceded by David Spencer | Australian Ambassador for APEC; 2009–2011 | Succeeded by David Spencer |
| Preceded by David Ritchie | Australian Ambassador to France; 2011–2014 | Succeeded by Stephen Brady |
