= Stephen Brady =

Australian diplomat

Stephen Christopher Brady AO, CVO
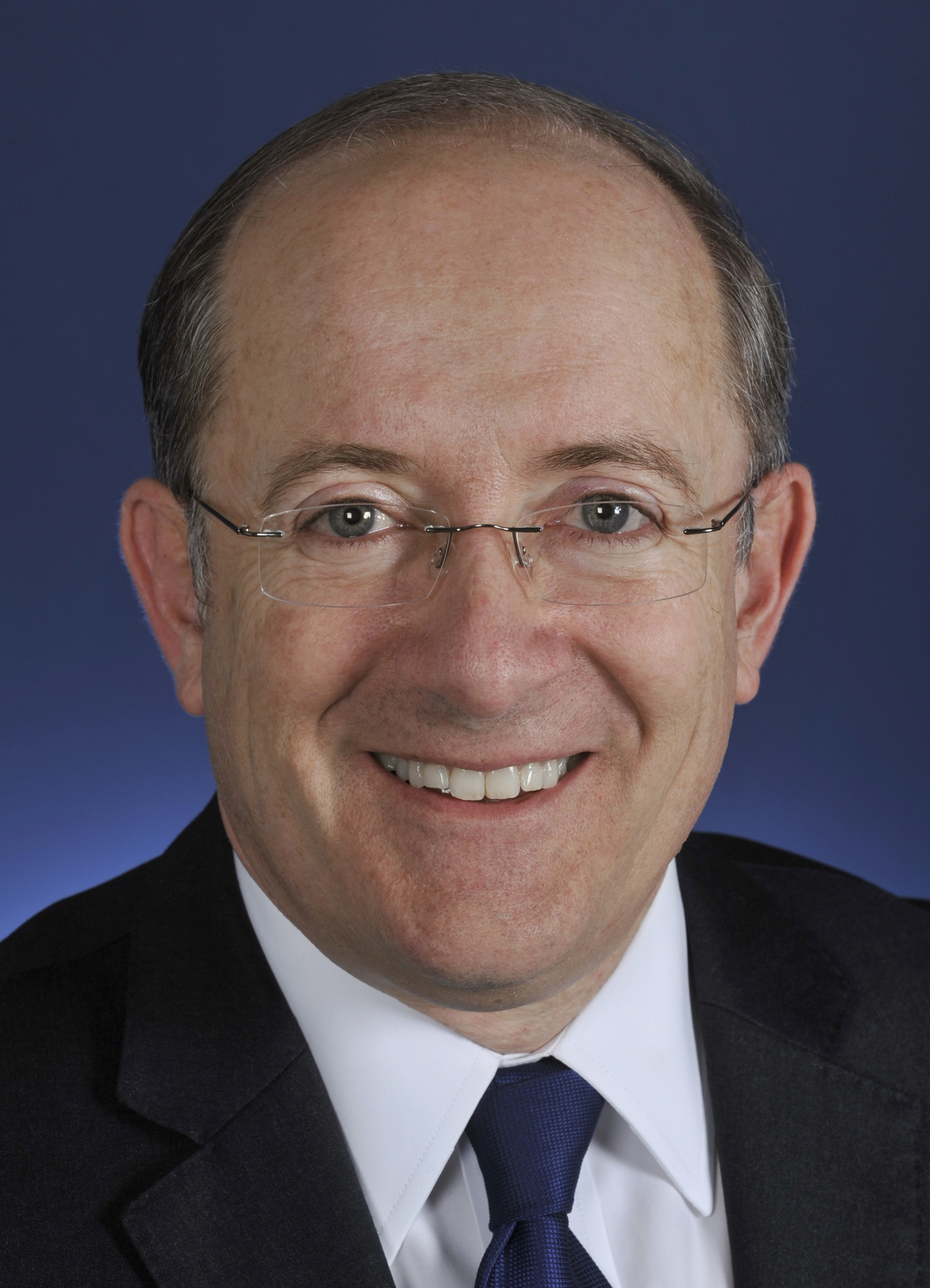

Australian Ambassador to France
- In office 28 September 2014 – 16 October 2017
- Preceded by: Ric Wells
- Succeeded by: Brendan Berne

10th Official Secretary to the Governor-General of Australia
- In office 5 September 2008 – 26 June 2014
- Monarch: Elizabeth II
- Governors-General: Dame Quentin Bryce (2008–14); Sir Peter Cosgrove (2014)
- Preceded by: Malcolm Hazell
- Succeeded by: Mark Fraser

Australian Ambassador to the Netherlands
- In office 6 August 2004 – 14 April 2008
- Preceded by: Peter Hussin
- Succeeded by: Lydia Morton

Australian Ambassador to Sweden
- In office 19 May 1998 – 28 September 2003
- Preceded by: Judith Pead
- Succeeded by: Richard Rowe

Personal details
- Born: Stephen Christopher Brady; 11 June 1959 (age 67) London, United Kingdom
- Domestic partner: Peter Stephens
- Education: Australian National University

Stephen Christopher Brady AO, CVO (born 11 June 1959) is an Australian former career diplomat. In 1999, he and his partner Peter Stephens became the world's first officially acknowledged same sex ambassadorial couple, when they were presented to Queen Margrethe II of Denmark at the start of Brady's posting as Australian Ambassador to Denmark. From September 2008 to June 2014 he was the Official Secretary to the Governor-General of Australia. During this time he was also Secretary of the Council of the Order of Australia and Secretary of the Bravery Decorations Council. In March 2014 his appointment as Ambassador to the French Republic, with concurrent accreditation to the Kingdom of Morocco, Algeria, Mauritania and the Principality of Monaco was announced.

== Early life ==
Brady was born in London on 11 June 1959 to Geoffrey Vincent Brady and his wife Susanne. The family moved to Australia in 1960, where Brady was educated at Canberra Grammar School and the Australian National University. He graduated with a Bachelor of Arts degree with Honours in international relations in 1981.

== Career ==
Brady joined the Department of Foreign Affairs in 1982 as a graduate foreign service officer. Promoted in 1985 to the Office of Security and Intelligence Coordination in the Department of the Prime Minister and Cabinet, he was subsequently foreign policy adviser to two Leaders of the Opposition. From 1990 – 1991 he was Counsellor and Chargé d'Affaires at the Australian Embassy in Dublin.

From 1991 to 1996, he was head of the Guest of Government program in the Department of the Prime Minister and Cabinet. On two later occasions he was seconded from the Department of Foreign Affairs and Trade (DFAT) to work for the Prime Minister as a Senior Adviser.

In December 1998, he was appointed Ambassador to Sweden with non-resident accreditation to Denmark, Norway, Finland, Iceland, Estonia, Latvia and Lithuania. He was Australia's Representative at three consecutive high level international conferences on combating intolerance and discrimination, held in Stockholm (2000–03). In 2000 he headed Australia's delegation to the Plurilateral War Crimes Conference in Riga, Latvia.

In February 1999, he made headlines as Australia's and the world's first openly gay ambassador when he formally presented his partner Peter Stephens to Queen Margrethe II of Denmark. Stephens's passport was initially endorsed "Bearer is a member of the domestic household of the Ambassador", until Brady, who had been in a committed relationship with Stephens since 1982, insisted that it be changed.

In February 2004, he was appointed Ambassador to the Netherlands. He was instrumental in coordinating arrangements with the Dutch government for Australia's joint military operation in Afghanistan which, according to Australian Chief of the Defence Force, Air Chief Marshal Angus Houston, "he facilitated brilliantly". Brady's diplomatic skills and remarkable and extensive network of connections were widely acknowledged.

In December 2007, he led Australia's delegation to the International Criminal Court's Assembly of State Parties Conference at the UN in New York.

He served as Australia's Permanent Representative to the Organisation for the Prohibition of Chemical Weapons in The Hague. In addition, he had responsibility for Australia's relationships with all international legal institutions based in The Hague. These included the International Court of Justice (ICJ), the International Criminal Court (ICC), the Permanent Court of Arbitration (PCA) and the International Court for the Former Yugoslavia (ICTY). On his return to Australia in March 2008 he was appointed Chief of Protocol in DFAT.

On 5 September 2008, Stephen Brady was appointed Official Secretary to the Governor-General of Australia. He served the entire term of Dame Quentin Bryce (2008–14) and into the early part of General Sir Peter Cosgrove's term (2014).

On 31 March 2014, his appointment as Australian Ambassador to France was announced. In May 2015, he reportedly offered his resignation (which was not accepted) to Australia's DFAT after an incident in which he refused to follow an instruction given by the travelling party of the Australian Prime Minister, after his partner was told to stay in the car and not greet Prime Minister Tony Abbott at an unofficial airport arrival in France. Prime Minister Abbott later described Brady as 'a fine servant of Australia.'

Towards the end of his posting in Paris, the French State appointed Brady as a Commandeur of the Legion of Honour for his outstanding leadership of the bilateral relationship, only the second Australian civilian to receive the level of award after Sir Ninian Stephen, a former Governor-General.

After completing his posting Brady has served on several boards and governing councils, including those for the Australian Strategic Policy Institute, National Gallery of Australia and Bangarra Dance Theatre. He is also an adjunct professor at Bond University.

== Honours ==
Officer of the Order of Australia (AO)	2015 Australia Day Honours. For distinguished service to successive Australian Governments, to international relations through senior diplomatic roles, to the fostering of security, economic and cultural initiatives, and as Official Secretary to the Governor-General.
Commander of the Royal Victorian Order (CVO)	Appointed to the Royal Victorian Order and invested by Her Majesty The Queen at Government House, Canberra on 25 October 2011.
Commander of the Order of St John	17 November 2010. The Governor-General, as Prior of the Order of St John, conferred the Commander of the Order (CStJ) on Brady.
Commander of the Order of Orange-Nassau (Netherlands)	30 April 2009 by Queen Beatrix of The Netherlands for his ambassadorial success in The Netherlands. He was later invested with the insignia at the Dutch Embassy in Canberra by Ambassador Willem Andreae.
Commander of the Order of the Crown (Tonga)	22 October 2010 by King George Tupou V of Tonga during his visit to Australia.
Commander of the Legion of Honour (France)	Conferred 6 April 2017 by Foreign Minister Le Drian at the Quai d'Orsay.

Diplomatic posts
Preceded by Judith Pead	Australian Ambassador to Sweden; 1999–2003	Succeeded by Richard Rowe
Preceded by Judith Pead	Australian Ambassador to Denmark; 1999–2000	Succeeded by Malcolm Leader
Preceded by Peter Hussin	Australian Ambassador to the Netherlands; 2004–2008	Succeeded by Lydia Morton
Preceded by Ric Wells	Australian Ambassador to France; 2014–2017	Succeeded by Brendan Berne
Preceded by Ric Wells	Australian Ambassador to Morocco; 2014–2017	Succeeded by Berenice Owen-Jones
Government offices
Preceded by Malcolm Hazell	Official Secretary to the Governor-General of Australia; 2008–2014	Succeeded by Mark Fraser
