= Australia–Morocco relations =

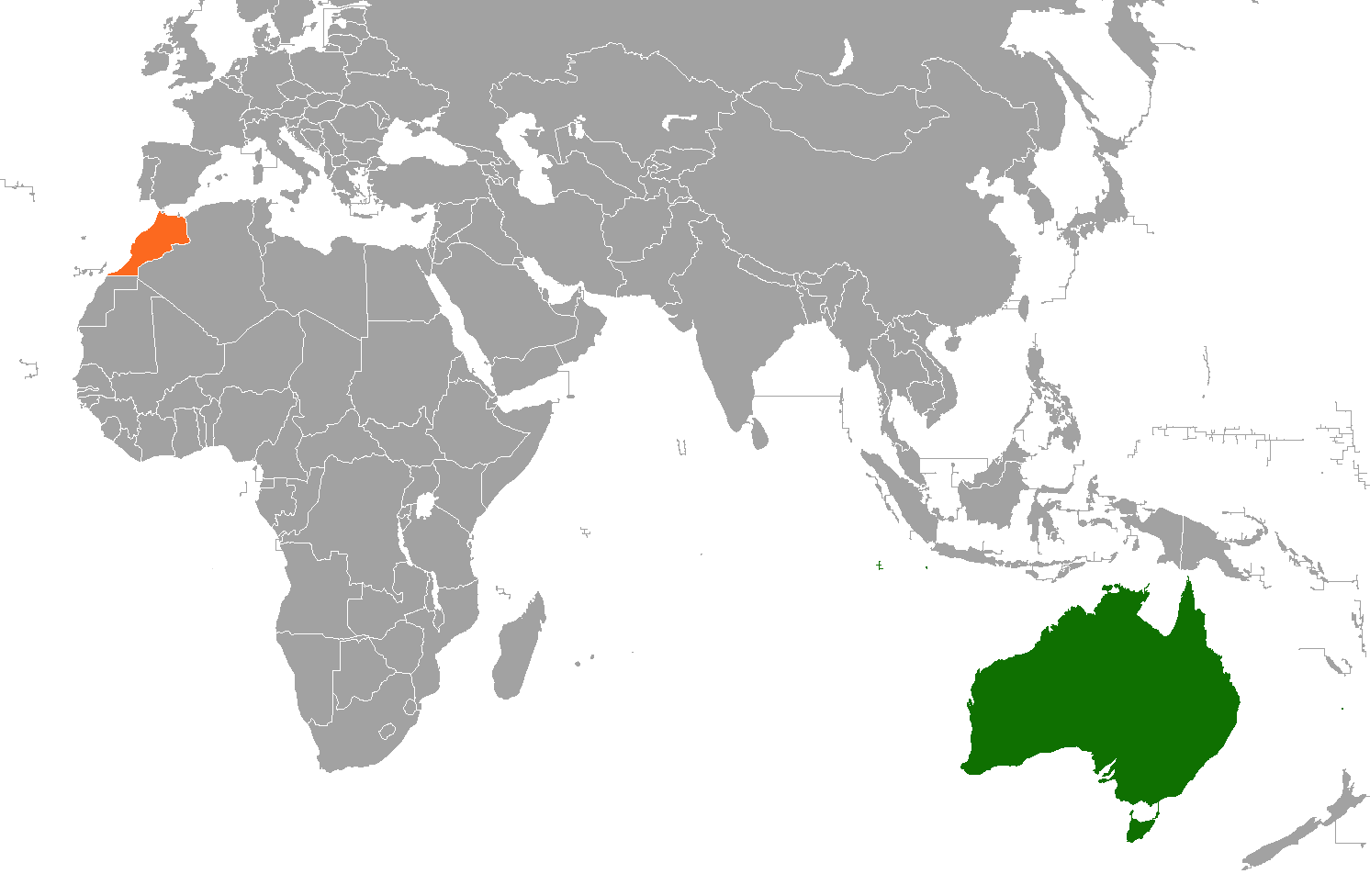

- Australia: Morocco

Diplomatic mission
- Embassy of Australia, Rabat: Embassy of Morocco, Canberra

Envoy
- Ambassador Michael Cutts: Ambassador Wassane Zailachi

Diplomatic relations between Australia and Morocco were established in 1976. Morocco has had an embassy in Canberra since 2004 and the Australian Embassy in Rabat was established in May 2017, upgrading the existing Austrade office in Rabat. Previously the Australian Embassy in Paris was accredited to Morocco since 1978.

== Diplomatic relations ==
On 13 July 1976, the Australian Minister for Foreign Affairs, Andrew Peacock, announced the release of a joint statement marking the establishment of diplomatic relations with Morocco as "a mark of the desire of both countries to consolidate and strengthen mutual understanding and to stimulate cultural and commercial links." On 6 October 1978 the acting Minister for Foreign Affairs, Ian Sinclair, announced the appointment of John Rowland, the serving Australian Ambassador to France, as the non-resident accredited Ambassador to Morocco. Rowland presented his credentials as ambassador to King Hassan II of Morocco on 19 February 1981.

The Moroccan Embassy to Indonesia in Jakarta was initially given responsibility for relations with Australia in 1997 with the Ambassador to Indonesia, Omar Hilale, presenting his credentials as the non-resident ambassador to Australia in 1997. In 2004, King Mohammed VI of Morocco announced the establishment of a Moroccan Embassy in Canberra and the first Ambassador, Badre Eddine Allali, presented his credentials to the Governor General of Australia on 24 November 2005. The Moroccan embassy is also accredited to Vanuatu, Kiribati, Fiji, New Zealand, Papua New Guinea and Tuvalu.

=== Australian official visits ===
- The first Australian official visit to Morocco occurred when a Parliamentary Delegation visited the country alongside Tunisia, Lebanon and Syria from 9 November to 3 December 1993. The delegation consisted of Delegation Leader Bob Brown (MP for Charlton), Deputy Leader John Moore (MP for Ryan), Senator Gerry Jones, Senator Baden Teague, Daryl Melham (MP for Banks), and Bruce Scott (MP for Maranoa).
- A more substantial visit occurred from 27 August to 9 September 2006 with an Australian Parliamentary Delegation led by Warren Entsch (MP for Leichhardt). The delegation also consisted of Deputy Leader Simon Crean (MP for Hotham) and Alan Griffin (MP for Bruce).
- Peter Garrett, the Minister for Environment Protection, Heritage and the Arts, visited Morocco to attend the 62nd session of the International Whaling Commission held in Agadir from 21 to 25 June 2010.
- Peter Slipper, Deputy Speaker of the House of Representatives, visited from 15 to 20 April 2011 and John Hogg, Australian Senate President, visited from 18 to 20 July 2011.
- Bob Carr, as Minister for Foreign Affairs, visited Morocco in the first high-level visit to the country in June 2012.
- A Parliamentary Delegation headed by Dr Sharman Stone (MP for Murray) to Morocco occurred from 7 to 14 November 2012.
- Foreign Minister Julie Bishop visited Morocco for the 2016 United Nations Climate Change Conference in Marrakech from 7–18 November 2016, announcing the opening of an Australian Embassy in Rabat at a joint press conference with Foreign Minister Salaheddine Mezouar.

=== Moroccan official visits ===
- First ministerial visit of the Moroccan Minister of Youth and Sports to the 2000 Sydney Olympic Games in September 2000.
- Visit of a Moroccan parliamentary delegation headed by Abdelwahad Radi, Speaker of the House of Representatives from 6–11 August 2007.
- Following Foreign Minister Carr's visit in June 2012, Moroccan Minister for Foreign Affairs and Cooperation, Saadeddine Othmani, visited Australia from 12 to 16 June 2012, the first such visit by a Moroccan Foreign Minister.

=== Australian embassy ===
In February 2012, the Australian Parliament Foreign Affairs Sub-committee of the Joint Standing Committee on Foreign Affairs, Defence and Trade undertook an inquiry into the state of Australia's overseas postings. The Ambassador of Morocco to Australia, Mohamed Mael-Ainin, subsequently made a submission to the inquiry arguing for the establishment of an Australian embassy in Morocco, noting: "An Australian embassy in Rabat, like all other great powers, will give an impetus to our ascending bilateral cooperation as well as facilitate Australia’s interests in neighbouring countries, especially French-speaking countries, in Africa." The Department of Foreign Affairs and Trade also noted to the committee that "an embassy in Morocco would increase Australia’s capacity to engage with a significant player in North Africa, including in the Arab League and the Organisation of Islamic Cooperation."

The subsequent report of the committee, entitled Australia’s Overseas Representation – Punching below our weight?, observed in its recommendations that "there is merit in opening an embassy in Morocco to serve the Maghreb and notes that this is in DFAT’s plans for an expanded network should it receive sufficient funds."

On 12 May 2017, Foreign Minister Julie Bishop announced the establishment of the Australian Embassy in Rabat and Berenice Owen-Jones as the new ambassador (taking up office in June 2017), noting that this appointment would be "an important addition to Australia’s diplomatic presence in Africa and part of the single largest expansion of our diplomatic network in 40 years."

Michael Cutts has been the Australian ambassador to Morocco since 4 September 2020.

== Trade and investment ==
Monthly value of Australian merchandise exports to Morocco (A$ millions) since 1988

Trade between Morocco and Australia is small but growing, with total merchandise trade between the two countries for 2015–16 being AUD$79,307, an increase of 17.2%. Major Australian exports to Morocco includes meat and sugars, honey and molasses, while major Moroccan exports to Australia include crude and processed fertilisers.

On 20 February 2025, the Moroccan government announced that Australia would export up to 100,000 sheep to Morocco, amidst a drought and dwindling herd numbers.

== Defence relations ==
Ties between the Australian Defence Force and the Royal Moroccan Armed Forces are limited. In June 2015, HMAS Anzac visited Casablanca in a rare visit to Morocco by an Australian naval vessel. In May 2011, a delegation from the Royal Moroccan Navy visited Australia to view Armidale-class patrol boats as a potential replacement to their existing patrol boat fleet.

In 1991, Australia sent 45 military personnel to serve as the Force Communications Unit of the United Nations Mission for the Referendum in Western Sahara (MINURSO). The Australian contingent was withdrawn in 1994. On 21 June 1993, Army Doctor Major Susan Felsche, of the Royal Australian Army Medical Corps, was killed in a Medical Unit aircraft crash, while serving in MINURSO.

There is a single Australian war grave in Morocco, maintained by the Commonwealth War Graves Commission: Flying Officer Leo George Hardiman, attached to No. 145 Maintenance Unit RAF, was killed in an accident on active service on 30 November 1944, and was buried at Ben M'Sik European Cemetery in Casablanca.

== Renewable energy cooperation ==
In an event celebrating Australia day in 2024, Australian ambassador, Cutts stressed the partnership between the two countries in green energy. The ambassador spoke about partnership in building a green hydrogen economy.

== Resident diplomatic missions ==
- Australia has an embassy in Rabat.
- Morocco has an embassy in Canberra.

== See also ==
- Foreign relations of Australia
- Foreign relations of Morocco
