= List of ambassadors and high commissioners of Australia =

The following is the list of ambassadors, high commissioners, and other official representatives from Australia. The information below is current as of 6 June 2025.

== Embassies and high commissions ==
Host country	Title	Head of mission
Afghanistan	Special Representative	Amanda McGregor
Argentina^{1}	Ambassador	Simon Twisk
Austria^{2}	Ambassador	Ian Briggs
Bangladesh	High Commissioner	Susan Ryle
Belgium^{3}	Ambassador	Angus Campbell
Brazil	Ambassador	Sophie Davies
Brunei	High Commissioner	Michael Hoy
Cambodia	Ambassador	Derek Yip
Canada	High Commissioner	Kate Logan
Chile^{4}	Ambassador	Andrew Martin
China	Ambassador	Scott Dewar
Colombia	Ambassador	Anna Chrisp
Cook Islands	High Commissioner	Susannah Hodson
Croatia	Ambassador	Richard Rodgers
Cyprus	High Commissioner	Emily Pugin
Denmark^{8}	Ambassador	Kerin Ayyalaraju
Egypt^{5}	Ambassador	Axel Wabenhorst
Estonia	Ambassador	Sridhar Ayyalaraju
Ethiopia^{6}	Ambassador	Peter Hunter
Fiji	High Commissioner	Peter Roberts
France^{9}	Ambassador	Lynette Wood
Germany^{10}	Ambassador	Natasha Smith
Ghana^{11}	High Commissioner	Berenice Owen-Jones
Greece^{12}	Ambassador	Alison Duncan
Holy See	Ambassador	Keith Pitt
India^{13}	High Commissioner	Philip Green
Indonesia	Ambassador	Rod Brazier
Iran	Ambassador	Ian McConville
Iraq	Ambassador	Glenn Miles
Ireland	Ambassador	Chantelle Taylor
Israel	Ambassador	Ralph King
Italy^{14}	Ambassador	Julianne Cowley
Japan	Ambassador	Justin Hayhurst
Jordan	Ambassador	Bernard Lynch
Kenya^{15}	High Commissioner	Jenny Da Rin
Kiribati	High Commissioner	Mark Foxe
Kuwait	Ambassador	Melissa Kelly
Laos	Ambassador	Megan Jones
Lebanon	Ambassador	Andrew Barnes
Malaysia	High Commissioner	Danielle Heinecke
Maldives	High Commissioner	David Jessup
Malta^{17}	High Commissioner	Matt Skelly
Marshall Islands	Ambassador	Paul Wilson
Mauritius^{18}	High Commissioner	Kate Chamley
Mexico^{19}	Ambassador	Rachel Moseley
Micronesia^{7}	Ambassador	Jenny Grant-Curnow
Mongolia	Ambassador	Leo Zeng
Morocco	Ambassador	Michael Cutts
Myanmar	Ambassador	Angela Corcoran
Nauru	High Commissioner	Matthew Barclay
Nepal	Ambassador	Leann Johnston
Netherlands	Ambassador	Greg French
New Zealand^{20}	High Commissioner	Daniel Sloper
Nigeria^{21}	High Commissioner	Leilani Bin-Juda
Pakistan	High Commissioner	Neil Hawkins
Palau	Ambassador	Toby Sharpe
Palestine	Australian Representative	Bethany Randell
Papua New Guinea	High Commissioner	Ewen McDonald
Peru	Ambassador	Maree Ringland
Philippines	Ambassador	Marc Innes-Brown
Poland^{22}	Ambassador	Benjamin Hayes
Portugal^{23}	Ambassador	Indra McCormick
Qatar	Ambassador	Shane Flanagan
Russia^{24}	Ambassador	John Geering
Samoa	High Commissioner	Will Robinson
Saudi Arabia^{25}	Ambassador	Mark Donovan
Serbia^{26}	Ambassador	Peter Truswell
Singapore	High Commissioner	Allaster Cox
Solomon Islands	High Commissioner	Rod Hilton
South Africa^{27}	High Commissioner	Tegan Brink
South Korea^{16}	Ambassador	Jeffrey Robinson
Spain^{28}	Ambassador	Rosemary Morris-Castico
Sri Lanka^{29}	High Commissioner	Paul Stephens
Sweden^{30}	Ambassador	Frances Sagala
Switzerland	Ambassador	Elizabeth Day
Taiwan	Australian Representative	Robert Fergusson
Thailand	Ambassador	Angela Macdonald
Timor-Leste	Ambassador	Caitlin Wilson
Tonga	High Commissioner	Brek Batley
Trinidad and Tobago^{31}	High Commissioner	Sonya Koppe
Turkiye^{32}	Ambassador	Miles Armitage
Tuvalu	High Commissioner	David Charlton
Ukraine^{33}	Ambassador	Paul Lehmann
United Arab Emirates^{34}	Ambassador	Ridwaan Jadat
United Kingdom^{35}	High Commissioner	Stephen Smith
United States of America	Ambassador	Greg Moriaty
Vanuatu	High Commissioner	Max Willis
Vietnam	Ambassador	Gillian Bird
Zimbabwe^{36}	Ambassador	Minoli Perera

== International organisations ==
Delegation to	Title	Head of mission
Asia Pacific Economic Cooperation	Ambassador	Elizabeth Ward
Association of South East Asian Nations	Ambassador	Tiffany McDonald
Organisation for Economic Co-operation and Development	Ambassador and Permanent Representative	Alexander Robson
United Nations	Ambassador and Permanent Representative	James Larsen
World Trade Organization	Ambassador and Permanent Representative	George Mina

== Special interests ==
Special interest	Title	Head of mission
Counterterrorism	Ambassador	Gemma Huggins
Cyber Affairs	Ambassador	Brendan Dowling
People Smuggling and Human Trafficking	Ambassador	Lynn Bell
Regional Health Security	Ambassador	Stephanie Williams
The Environment	Ambassador	Jamie Isbister
Women and Girls	Ambassador	Julie-Ann Guivarra

== Notes ==
- ^Note 1: The Ambassador of Australia to Argentina is also accredited to Paraguay and Uruguay as a non-resident ambassador.
- ^Note 2: The Ambassador of Australia to Austria is also accredited to Bosnia and Herzegovina, Hungary, Kosovo, Slovakia, and Slovenia as a non-resident ambassador. The Ambassador also acts as Australia's Resident Representative and Governor on the Board of Governors of the International Atomic Energy Agency (IAEA), and Permanent Representative to the United Nations Office in Vienna and Permanent Representative to the Comprehensive Test Ban Treaty (CTBTO) Preparatory Commission.
- ^Note 3: The Ambassador of Australia to Belgium is also accredited to Luxembourg as a non-resident ambassador. The Ambassador also acts as Australia's Ambassador to the European Union and NATO.
- ^Note 4: The Ambassador of Australia to Chile is also accredited to Colombia, Ecuador and Venezuela as a non-resident ambassador.
- ^Note 5: The Ambassador of Australia to Egypt is also accredited to Eritrea, Sudan and Syria as a non-resident ambassador.
- ^Note 6: The Ambassador of Australia to Ethiopia is also accredited to Djibouti and South Sudan as a non-resident ambassador. The Ambassador also acts as Australia's Permanent Representative to the African Union.
- ^Note 7: The Ambassador of Australia to the Federated States of Micronesia is also accredited to the Marshall Islands and Palau as a non-resident ambassador. The Ambassador is also the Australian Consul-General to Guam and the Northern Mariana Islands.
- ^Note 8: The Ambassador of Australia to Denmark is also accredited to Norway and Iceland as a non-resident ambassador.
- ^Note 9: The Ambassador of Australia to France is also accredited to Algeria, Chad, Mauritania, Monaco and Morocco as a non-resident ambassador.
- ^Note 10: The Ambassador of Australia to Germany is also accredited to Liechtenstein and Switzerland as a non-resident ambassador.
- ^Note 11: The High Commissioner of Australia to Ghana is also accredited to Burkina Faso, Côte d'Ivoire, Guinea, Liberia, Mali, Senegal, Sierra Leone and Togo as a non-resident ambassador.
- ^Note 12: The Ambassador of Australia to Greece is also accredited to Bulgaria and Romania as a non-resident ambassador.
- ^Note 13: The High Commissioner of Australia to India is also accredited to Bhutan as a non-resident ambassador.
- ^Note 14: The Ambassador of Australia to Italy is also accredited to Albania, Libya and San Marino as a non-resident ambassador, as well as Australia's Permanent Representative to the Food and Agriculture Organization and Representative to the World Food Programme.
- ^Note 15: The High Commissioner of Australia to Kenya is also accredited to Burundi, Rwanda, Somalia, Tanzania and Uganda as a non-resident ambassador. The Australian High Commissioner also acts as Australia's Permanent Representative to the East African Community, United Nations Environment Programme (UNEP) and the United Nations Human Settlements Programme (UN-HABITAT).
- ^Note 16: The Ambassador of Australia to South Korea is also accredited to Mongolia and North Korea as a non-resident ambassador.
- ^Note 17: The High Commissioner of Australia to Malta is also accredited to Tunisia as a non-resident ambassador.
- ^Note 18: The High Commissioner of Australia to Mauritius is also accredited to Comoros, Madagascar and Seychelles as a non-resident ambassador.
- ^Note 19: The Ambassador of Australia to Mexico is also accredited to Costa Rica, Cuba, the Dominican Republic, El Salvador, Guatemala, Honduras, Panama and Nicaragua as a non-resident ambassador.
- ^Note 20: The High Commissioner of Australia to New Zealand is also accredited to the Cook Islands as a non-resident High Commissioner.
- ^Note 21: The High Commissioner of Australia to Nigeria is also accredited to Benin, Republic of the Congo, Cameroon, Gabon, Niger and The Gambia as a non-resident ambassador.
- ^Note 22: The Ambassador of Australia to Poland is also accredited to the Czech Republic and Lithuania, as a non-resident ambassador.
- ^Note 23: The Ambassador of Australia to Portugal is also accredited to Cape Verde and São Tomé and Príncipe as a non-resident ambassador.
- ^Note 24: The Ambassador of Australia to Russia is also accredited to Armenia, Belarus, Kazakhstan, Kyrgyzstan, Moldova, Tajikistan, Turkmenistan and Uzbekistan as a non-resident ambassador.
- ^Note 25: The Ambassador of Australia to Saudi Arabia is also accredited to Bahrain and Oman as a non-resident ambassador.
- ^Note 26: The Ambassador of Australia to Serbia is also accredited to Macedonia and Montenegro as a non-resident ambassador.
- ^Note 27: The High Commissioner of Australia to South Africa is also accredited to Botswana, Lesotho, Mozambique, Namibia and Swaziland as a non-resident High Commissioner, and to Angola as a non-resident ambassador. The High Commissioner also acts as Australia's Ambassador to the Southern African Development Community.
- ^Note 28: The Ambassador of Australia to Spain is also accredited to Andorra and Equatorial Guinea as a non-resident ambassador.
- ^Note 29: The High Commissioner of Australia to Sri Lanka is also accredited to Maldives as a non-resident High Commissioner.
- ^Note 30: The Ambassador of Australia to Sweden is also accredited to Estonia, Finland and Latvia as a non-resident ambassador.
- ^Note 31: The High Commissioner of Australia to Trinidad and Tobago is also accredited to Antigua and Barbuda, the Bahamas, Barbados, Belize, Dominica, Grenada, Guyana, Jamaica, Saint Kitts and Nevis, Saint Lucia and Saint Vincent and the Grenadines as a non-resident High Commissioner, and to Haiti and Suriname as a non-resident ambassador. The High Commissioner also acts as Australia's Ambassador to CARICOM.
- ^Note 32: The Ambassador of Australia to Turkey is also accredited to Azerbaijan and Georgia as a non-resident ambassador.
- ^Note 33: The Ambassador of Australia to Ukraine is also accredited to Moldova as a non-resident ambassador.
- ^Note 34: The Ambassador of Australia to the United Arab Emirates is also accredited to Qatar as a non-resident ambassador.
- ^Note 35: The High Commissioner of Australia to the United Kingdom is also accredited as Permanent Representative of Australia to the International Maritime Organization.
- ^Note 36: The Ambassador of Australia to Zimbabwe is also accredited to Zambia, Malawi, the Democratic Republic of the Congo, and the Republic of the Congo as a non-resident ambassador.
