= List of ambassadors of Australia to Kuwait =

Ambassador of Australia to Kuwait

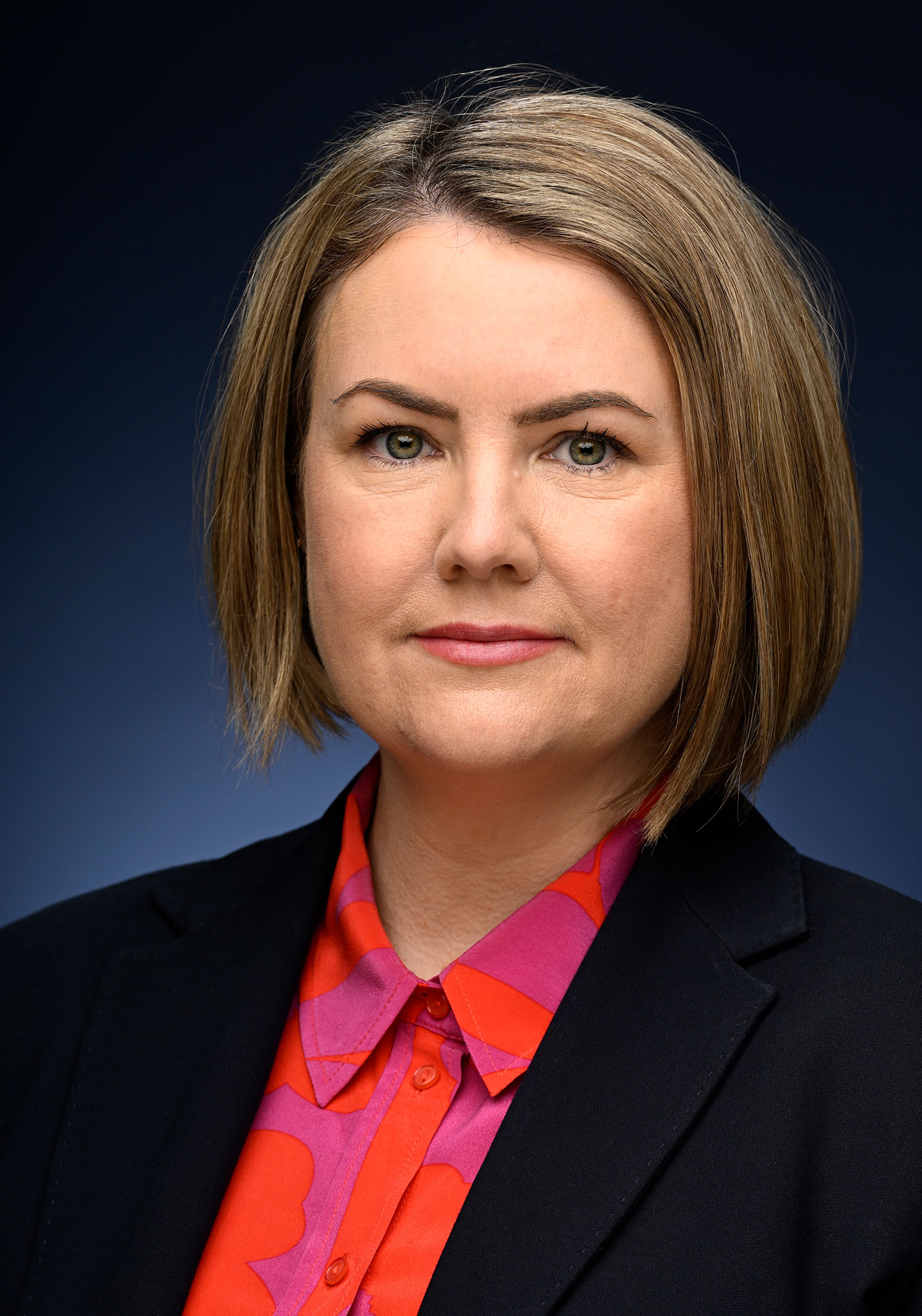
- Incumbent; Melissa Kelly since 30 September 2022
- Department of Foreign Affairs and Trade
- Style: His Excellency
- Reports to: Minister for Foreign Affairs
- Nominator: Prime Minister of Australia
- Appointer: Governor General of Australia
- Inaugural holder: Ian Haig (as the Australian Ambassador to Saudi Arabia received nnon-resident accreditation)
- Formation: 23 December 2004
- Website: Australian Embassy in Kuwait

The ambassador of Australia to Kuwait is the Australian Government's foremost diplomatic representative in Kuwait. The ambassador is an officer of the Australian Department of Foreign Affairs and Trade and the head of the Embassy of the Commonwealth of Australia to the State of Kuwait. The position has the rank and status of an ambassador extraordinary and plenipotentiary. The current ambassador, since 21 November 2017, is Jonathan Gilbert.

While the Australian Embassy in Kuwait City has been open since 23 December 2004, Kuwait and Australia have enjoyed diplomatic relations since 1974, when the inaugural ambassador to Saudi Arabia in Jeddah received non-resident accreditation for Kuwait.

== List of ambassadors ==
Ordinal	Officeholder	Residency	Term start date	Term end date	Time in office	Notes
1	Ian Haig	Jeddah, Saudi Arabia	1974	1976	1–2 years	
2	Donald Kingsmill	Jeddah, Saudi Arabia	1976	1979	2–3 years	
3	Douglas Sturkey	Jeddah, Saudi Arabia	1979	1983	3–4 years	
4	Alan Brown	Jeddah, Saudi Arabia	1983	1984	4–5 years	
4	Alan Brown	Riyadh, Saudi Arabia	1984	1988	4–5 years	
5	Alex McGoldrick	Riyadh, Saudi Arabia	1988	1991	2–3 years	
6	Malcolm Leader	Riyadh, Saudi Arabia	1991	1993	1–2 years	
7	Warwick Weemaes	Riyadh, Saudi Arabia	1993	1996	2–3 years	
8	Philip Knight	Riyadh, Saudi Arabia	1996	1998	1–2 years	
9	George Aitkin	Riyadh, Saudi Arabia	1998	2000	1–2 years	
10	Bob Tyson	Riyadh, Saudi Arabia	2000	23 December 2004	3–4 years	
11	Ralph King	Kuwait City, Kuwait	23 December 2004	December 2007	2 years, 11 months	
12	Glenn Miles	Kuwait City, Kuwait	December 2007	28 November 2011	3 years, 11 months	
(13)	Bob Tyson	Kuwait City, Kuwait	28 November 2011	9 February 2015	3 years, 73 days	
14	Warren Hauck	Kuwait City, Kuwait	9 February 2015	21 December 2017	2 years, 315 days	
15	Jonathan Gilbert	Kuwait City, Kuwait	21 December 2017	1 July 2022	4 years, 192 days	
16	Melissa Kelly	Kuwait City, Kuwait	30 September 2022	incumbent	4 years, 47 days	
