= List of high commissioners of Australia to Malta =

High Commissioner of Australia to Malta

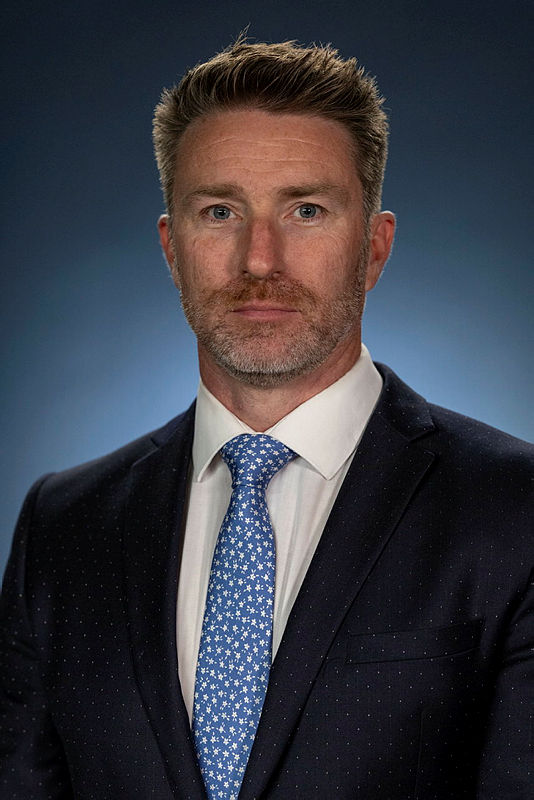
- Incumbent; Matt Skelly since 11 July 2023
- Department of Foreign Affairs and Trade
- Style: His Excellency
- Reports to: Minister for Foreign Affairs
- Seat: Sliema (1967–1992); Ta' Xbiex (since 1993)
- Nominator: Prime Minister of Australia
- Appointer: Governor General of Australia
- Inaugural holder: Douglas Sturkey (Acting)
- Formation: 30 March 1967
- Website: Australian High Commission, Malta

The high commissioner of Australia to Malta is an officer of the Australian Department of Foreign Affairs and Trade and the head of the High Commission of the Commonwealth of Australia in Malta. The position has the rank and status of an ambassador extraordinary and plenipotentiary and is currently held by Matt Skelly since 11 July 2023. The high commissioner also holds non-resident accreditation as ambassador to Tunisia (since 2012). There has been a resident Australian high commissioner in Malta since 1967.

== Posting history ==
Australia first established an official presence in Malta with the establishment of a Migration Office on 4 September 1961, with the primary responsibility of managing the migration of Maltese to Australia, based in the Palazzo Spinola in Valletta until 1963, and then in Airways House in Sliema from 1963. Australia recognised the State of Malta on its independence on 21 September 1964, with a former Commonwealth minister, Alick Downer, and the ambassador of Australia to the Netherlands, Walter Crocker, representing Australia during the independence celebrations on 19–23 September.

On 12 October 1966, the government of Harold Holt approved the establishment of a resident High Commission in Malta, and on 6 November 1966 during an official visit to Melbourne by the Prime Minister of Malta, Borg Olivier, prime ministers Holt and Olivier issued a joint communique indicating that the appointment of a high commissioner was imminent. An officer with the Department of External Affairs, Douglas Sturkey, took up office as acting high commissioner in Malta on 30 March 1967. The first high commissioner, former immigration minister Sir Hubert Opperman, took up office in July 1967 and presented his letters of commission on 24 July 1967.

=== Tunisia ===
The first resident Australian Ambassador to Algeria since 5 April 1976, John Anthony Piper, was accredited to Tunisia as non-resident Ambassador on 22 October 1976, and presented his credentials to the President of Tunisia, Habib Bourguiba, on 23 June 1977. Responsibility for Tunisia was transferred from the Algiers embassy to the Australian Embassy in Amman, Jordan, on 3 January 1989. From 3 January 1989 to 14 April 1999, the Australian Ambassador to Jordan was accredited to Tunisia.

From 14 April 1999 until December 2012, non-resident accreditation for Tunisia was held by the Ambassador of Australia to Egypt in Cairo. The Australian High Commission in Malta has been accredited to Tunisia since the appointment of Jane Lambert in December 2012 as the non-resident ambassador.

== High commissioners ==
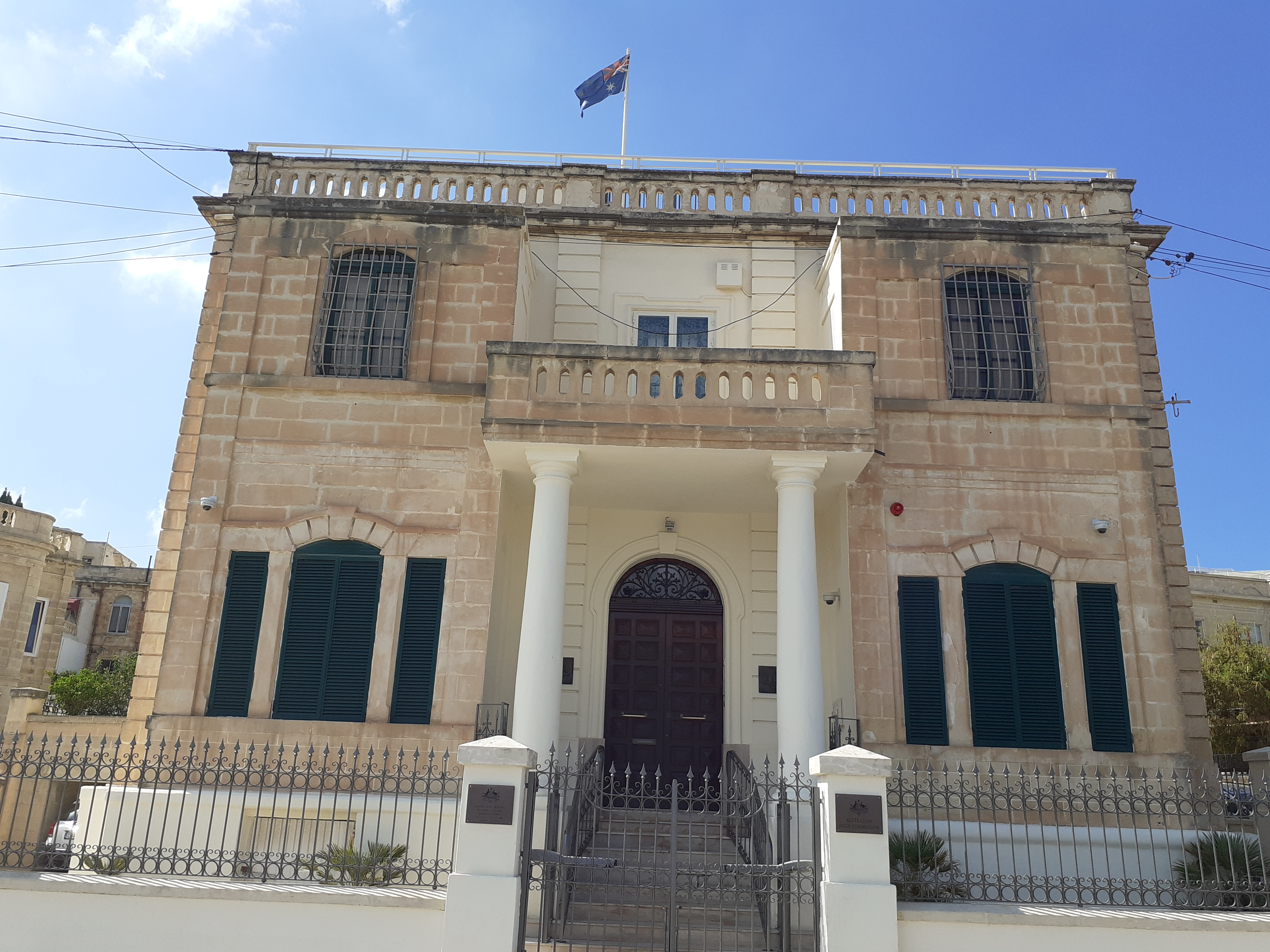
No. 14 Ir-Rampa Ta'Xbiex, chancery of the Australian High Commission since 1993.

#	Officeholder	Residency	Other offices	Term start date	Term end date	Time in office	Notes
−	Douglas Sturkey (Acting)	Sliema	n/a	30 March 1967	July 1967	3 months	
1	Sir Hubert Opperman	Sliema	n/a	July 1967	20 September 1972	5 years, 2 months	
2	Bill Cutts	Sliema	n/a	20 September 1972	June 1975	2 years, 8 months	
3	Ian Nicholson	Sliema	n/a	June 1975	October 1976	1 year, 4 months	
4	John McMillan	Sliema	^{A}	October 1976	22 August 1978	1 year, 10 months	
−	Geoffrey Pretyman (Acting)	Sliema	n/a	22 August 1978	31 August 1981	3 years, 9 days	
5	Guy Cotsell	Sliema	^{B}	31 August 1981	September 1984	3 years	
6	Ross Smith	Sliema	n/a	September 1984	May 1987	2 years, 8 months	
7	Gregory Gibson	Sliema	n/a	May 1987	September 1990	3 years, 4 months	
8	John Mahoney	Sliema	n/a	September 1990	1992	3 years, 2 months	
8	John Mahoney	Ta' Xbiex	n/a	1993	November 1993	3 years, 2 months	
9	Christopher Freeman	Ta' Xbiex	n/a	November 1993	January 1997	3 years, 2 months	
10	Colin Willis	Ta' Xbiex	n/a	January 1997	February 2000	3 years, 1 month	
11	Iain Dickie	Ta' Xbiex	n/a	February 2000	July 2003	3 years, 5 months	
12	Richard Palk	Ta' Xbiex	n/a	July 2003	August 2006	3 years, 1 month	
13	Jurek Juszczyk	Ta' Xbiex	n/a	August 2006	December 2009	3 years, 4 months	
14	Anne Quinane	Ta' Xbiex	n/a	December 2009	December 2012	3 years	
15	Jane Lambert	Ta' Xbiex	^{C}	December 2012	December 2016	4 years	
16	Julienne Hince	Ta' Xbiex	^{C}	December 2016	February 2020	3 years, 2 months	
−	Suzanne McKellar (Acting)	Ta' Xbiex	^{C}	February 2020	20 July 2020	5 months	
17	Jennifer Cartmill	Ta' Xbiex	^{C}	20 July 2020	11 July 2023	6 years, 49 days	
18	Matt Skelly	Ta' Xbiex	^{C}	11 July 2023	Incumbent	3 years, 58 days	

== Notes ==
^A Also non-resident ambassador to the Holy See, 1976–1978.
^B Acting high commissioner until 14 July 1982.
^C Also non-resident ambassador to Tunisia, 2012–present.

== See also ==
- Australia–Malta relations
