= Philip Green (diplomat) =

Australian diplomat

His Excellency Philip Green OAM
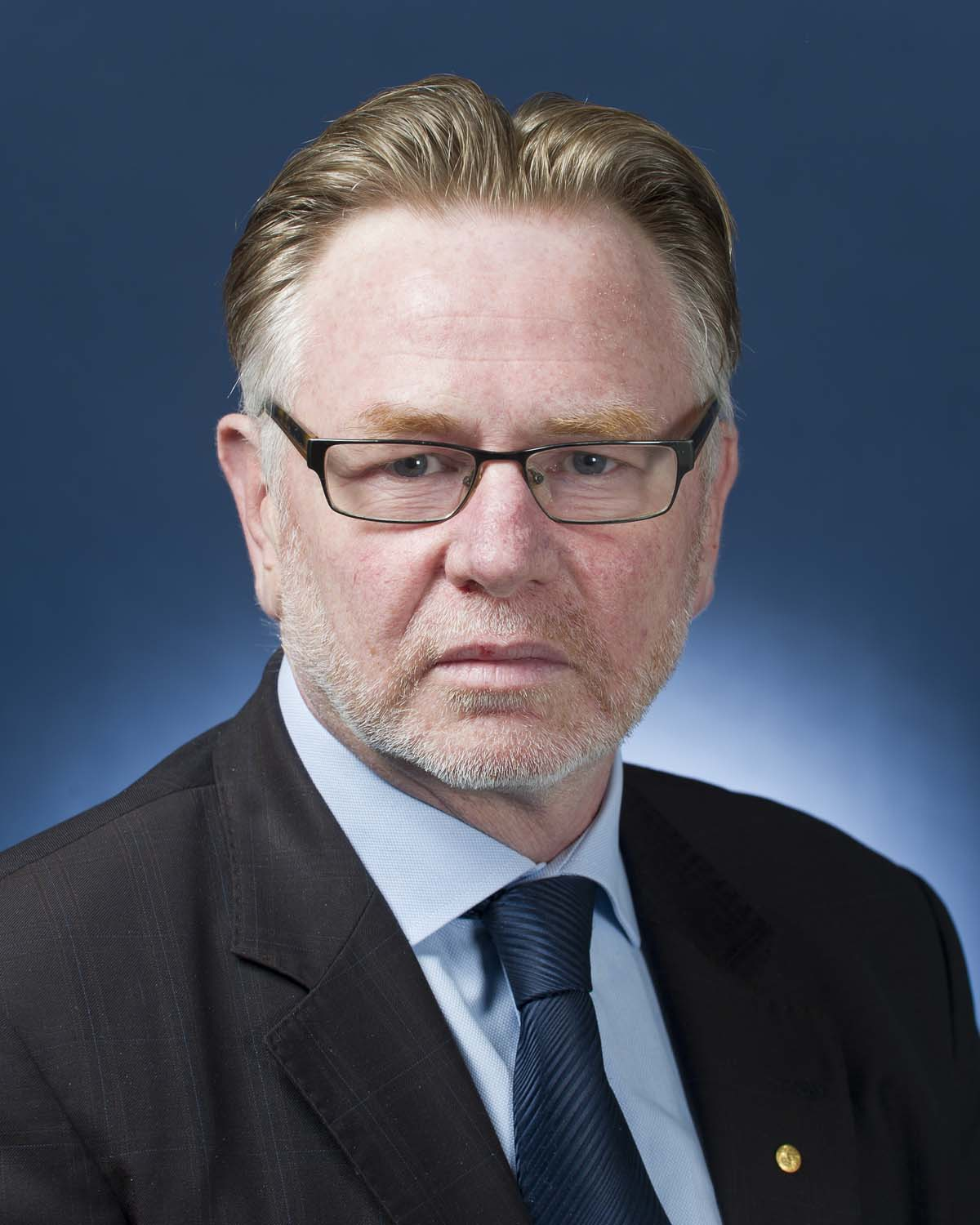

High Commissioner of Australia to India
- Incumbent
- Assumed office 1 July 2023
- Preceded by: Barry O'Farrell

Ambassador of Australia to Germany
- In office 20 October 2020 – 20 June 2023
- Preceded by: Lynette Wood
- Succeeded by: Natasha Smith

High Commissioner of Australia to Singapore
- In office 25 August 2012 – December 2016
- Preceded by: Doug Chester
- Succeeded by: Bruce Gosper

High Commissioner of Australia to South Africa
- In office 10 June 2004 – 25 November 2008
- Preceded by: Ian Wilcock
- Succeeded by: Ann Harrap

Ambassador of Australia to Ethiopia
- In office January 1998 – January 2001
- Preceded by: John Trotter
- Succeeded by: Paul Comfort

High Commissioner of Australia to Kenya
- In office January 1998 – December 2000
- Preceded by: John Trotter
- Succeeded by: Paul Comfort

Personal details
- Born: Philip Victor Green
- Spouse: Susan Marks
- Education: University of Sydney (B.A., LLB)

Philip Green is an Australian diplomat who is currently the High Commissioner of Australia to India. He concurrently serves as the non-resident Ambassador to Bhutan.

== Early life and education ==
He holds a bachelor's in arts and a bachelor's in law from the University of Sydney.

== Career ==
In 2002, he was awarded the OAM for his role in the response to the 2002 Bali Bombings.

He served as the Australian high commissioner in South Africa (2004-2008). While High Commissioner to South Africa, he concurrently served as non-resident High Commissioner to Swaziland, Lesotho, Botswana, Mozambique and Namibia. He served as Australia's High Commissioner to Kenya from 1998 to 2000, and concurrently Ambassador to Ethiopia and non-resident High Commissioner to Uganda, Tanzania and Eritrea.

In 2004 he led the Secretariat for the Review of Australian Intelligence Agencies.

Subsequently, he was appointed International Advisor to Prime Minister Kevin Rudd, and was later appointed the Chief of Staff when Rudd was foreign minister.

He was appointed the Australian Ambassador to Germany in 2020 and later High Commissioner to India in 2023. From 2020 until 2022, Green also served as Australia's chief diplomat in both Liechtenstein and Switzerland.

Green presented his credentials as Australia's High Commissioner to India to India's President Murmu on 21 August 2023. On 6 June 2024 he presented his credentials to The King of Bhutan.

In a keynote address to outline his vision as Australia's High Commissioner to India in December 2023, Green defined the Australia-India relationship as driven by "necessity, opportunity, and affinity". He said his priority was to "get more things done", with his priorities being maritime domain awareness, two-way trade and investment (including a full Comprehensive Economic Cooperation Agreement), and a focused green energy and critical minerals partnership.

In a departure from his predecessors, Green spoke often about "differences" between Australia and India, including on governance, institutions, and society, and India's alleged actions in United States and Canada.

== Personal life ==
He is married to Susan Marks, who is a professor at the London School of Economics. This is Green's second marriage. He has 3 children.

== Awards ==
- OAM
- Honorary degrees from James Cook University and Murdoch University
