= Neil Truscott =

Australian public servant and diplomat (1923–2011)

Neil Truscott AM
- Born: 14 January 1923; Warrnambool, Victoria, Australia
- Died: 23 January 2011 (aged 88); Canberra, Australia
- Occupations: Public servant, diplomat

Horace Neil Truscott AM (14 January 1923 – 23 January 2011) was an Australian public servant and diplomat.

== Life ==
Born in Warrnambool, Victoria on 14 January 1923, Neil Truscott moved to Perth when he was 8. He studied at Wesley College, then at a university for a year (law), before enlisting in the Royal Australian Navy for two years. He was accepted into the Department of External Affairs during World War II, one of 12 accepted into the diplomatic service from 1600 applicants.

His early diplomatic posts were in Washington, Singapore, Jakarta and Bonn. From February 1966 to 1970, Truscott was Australian Consul-General in San Francisco. In the role, Truscott attended several functions each week, often at universities in the Bay Area, and fielded many questions about the White Australia policy which had by that time been abolished.

In 1970, he was posted to Beirut, Lebanon, as ambassador, being also accredited to Syria, Jordan, Iraq, and Saudi Arabia. He left 1973 to various roles in Canberra, before in 1975–1977 being head of the Foreign Affairs office in Melbourne, Victoria.

In 1977, he moved to Baghdad as the first Australian resident ambassador to Iraq. Ahead of the move, he studied Arabic at the Australian National University. He was appointed Australian Ambassador to Syria, Jordan and Lebanon in September 1978.

Truscott was made a Member of the Order of Australia in the 2002 Queen's Birthday Honours, for service through a range of community and social welfare organisations in Canberra, and to international relations through the Australian Diplomatic Service and the Australasian Middle East Studies Association.

Truscott died in Canberra on 23 January 2011.

Diplomatic posts
Preceded by Frederick Homer	Australian Consul-General in San Francisco; 1966–1970	Succeeded by Roger Dean
Preceded by Bill Forsyth	Australian Ambassador to Lebanon; 1970–1973	Succeeded by Pierre Hutton
Preceded by John Starey as Chargé d'affaires	Australian Ambassador to Iraq; 1977–1979	Succeeded by John Starey
Preceded by John McCarthy as Chargé d'affaires	Australian Ambassador to Syria; Australian Ambassador to Jordan; Australian Ambassador to Lebanon; 1979–1981	Succeeded by D.G. Wilson
