= Julienne Hince =

Australian diplomat

Former Australian High Commissioner to Malta
- In office 2016 – February 2020
- Preceded by: Jane Lambert
- Succeeded by: Suzanne McKellar (Acting)

Personal details
- Education: Australian National University, University of Melbourne

Julienne Hince was the Australian High Commissioner to Malta (2016–2020), replacing Jane Lambert. She is also accredited as non-resident Ambassador to Tunisia.

She has a Graduate Diploma in Foreign Affairs from the Australian National University and a Bachelor of Arts from the University of Melbourne.
