= Peter Curtis (diplomat) =

Australian public servant and diplomat (1929–2013)

- Born: Peter Campbell John Curtis; 8 September 1929
- Died: 5 May 2013 (aged 83)
- Education: University of Sydney (BA); University of Oxford (MA)
- Occupations: Public servant, diplomat
- Spouse: Chantal Courant (m. 1954–2013)

Peter Campbell John Curtis (8 September 1929 – 5 May 2013) was an Australian public servant and diplomat.

Curtis was born on 8 September 1929. He grew up in Sydney, attending Riverview College and later the University of Sydney, before going on to study at the University of Oxford in the United Kingdom.

In 1957, Curtis joined the Department of External Affairs.

Curtis' first ambassadorial posting was to Laos in 1969. Returning to Canberra in 1972, Curtis was appointed assistant secretary of the Personnel Branch of the Department of Foreign Affairs (the external affairs department's name had been changed in 1970). In the role he led a property acquisition trip to Hanoi in advance of establishing a mission in Vietnam.

He was appointed Ambassador to Lebanon, Syria, Iraq and Jordan in 1975. The posting was based in Beirut.

From 1976 to 1979, Curtis was Australian High Commissioner to India and Nepal.

In 1982, Curtis was appointed Australian Ambassador to France.

Diplomatic posts
Preceded by John Ryan	Australian Ambassador to Laos; 1969–1972	Succeeded by A.H. Borthwick
Preceded by Pierre Hutton	Australian Ambassador to Iraq; Australian Ambassador to Syria; Australian Ambassador to Jordan; Australian Ambassador to Lebanon; 1975–1976	Succeeded by John Starey as Chargé d'affaires
Preceded by Bruce Grant	Australian High Commissioner to India; Australian Ambassador to Nepal; 1976–1979	Succeeded by Gordon Upton
Preceded by John Rowland	Australian Ambassador to France; 1982–1987	Succeeded by Ted Pocock
Preceded by Harold David Anderson	Australian Ambassador to Belgium; 1987–1991	Succeeded by David Sadleir
Preceded by Chris Hurford	Australian Consul General in New York; 1992–1994	Succeeded by James Humphreys
