= John Lavett =

Australian public servant and diplomat

- Born: John Leslie Lavett; 18 December 1926; Sydney, New South Wales
- Died: 22 October 2006 (aged 79); Canberra
- Education: University of Sydney (BA)
- Occupations: Public servant, diplomat
- Spouses: Lorna Mathie (m. 1955; died 1959): Patricia Louise Scown
- Children: 4
- Parent(s): Alma Myrtle Garling and John Kimpton Rowley Lavett
- Awards: Papua New Guinea Independence Medal

John Leslie Lavett (18 December 1926 – 22 October 2006) was an Australian public servant and diplomat. He was Australian Ambassador to Burma from 1977 to 1980 and Australian High Commissioner to Kenya from 1980 to 1982. Prior to his diplomatic career he was in the Royal Australian Navy.

== Life and career ==
Lavett was born on 18 December 1926 in Sydney to Alma and John Lavett.

After completing his secondary schooling at Scotch College, Melbourne, Lavett joined the Royal Australian Navy and was commissioned in 1945. In 1947 he was a Lieutenant aboard LST 3501. He spent several weeks in December 1947 helping to establish a base on Heard Island, which had just been transferred to Australia from the United Kingdom. On the expedition he also visited Macquarie Island. In 1948, Cape Lavett on Heard Island was named in his honour. In 1964, Cape Lavett was renamed Lavett Bluff.

Lavett joined the Department of External Affairs in 1953. His first overseas posting as an officer of the department began in June 1955 as third secretary at the Australian High Commission in Ottawa. He arrived in Canada as a newly-wed, having just married Lorna Mathie of Auburn. Lavett and his wife returned to Canberra in July 1958. Lorna died suddenly at Melbourne in December 1959.

In 1973, Lavett was appointed as assistant secretary heading the West Asia and Middle East Branch in the Department of Foreign Affairs (the External Affairs Department had been renamed Foreign Affairs in 1970).

From 1974 to 1977, Lavett was Deputy High Commissioner of Australia in Port Moresby. His appointment was shortly after the start of self-government in Papua New Guinea.

Lavett was appointed Ambassador to Burma in 1977 and remained in the role until 1980. Between 1980 and 1982 he was High Commissioner to Kenya.

Diplomatic posts
Preceded by R.C. Whitty as Chargé d'affaires	Australian Ambassador to Burma; 1977–1979	Succeeded by R.K. Gate
Preceded by Hugh Dunn	Australian High Commissioner to Kenya; Australian Ambassador to Ethiopia; 1980–1981	Succeeded by Geoffrey White
