= Heidi Venamore =

Australian diplomat and painter

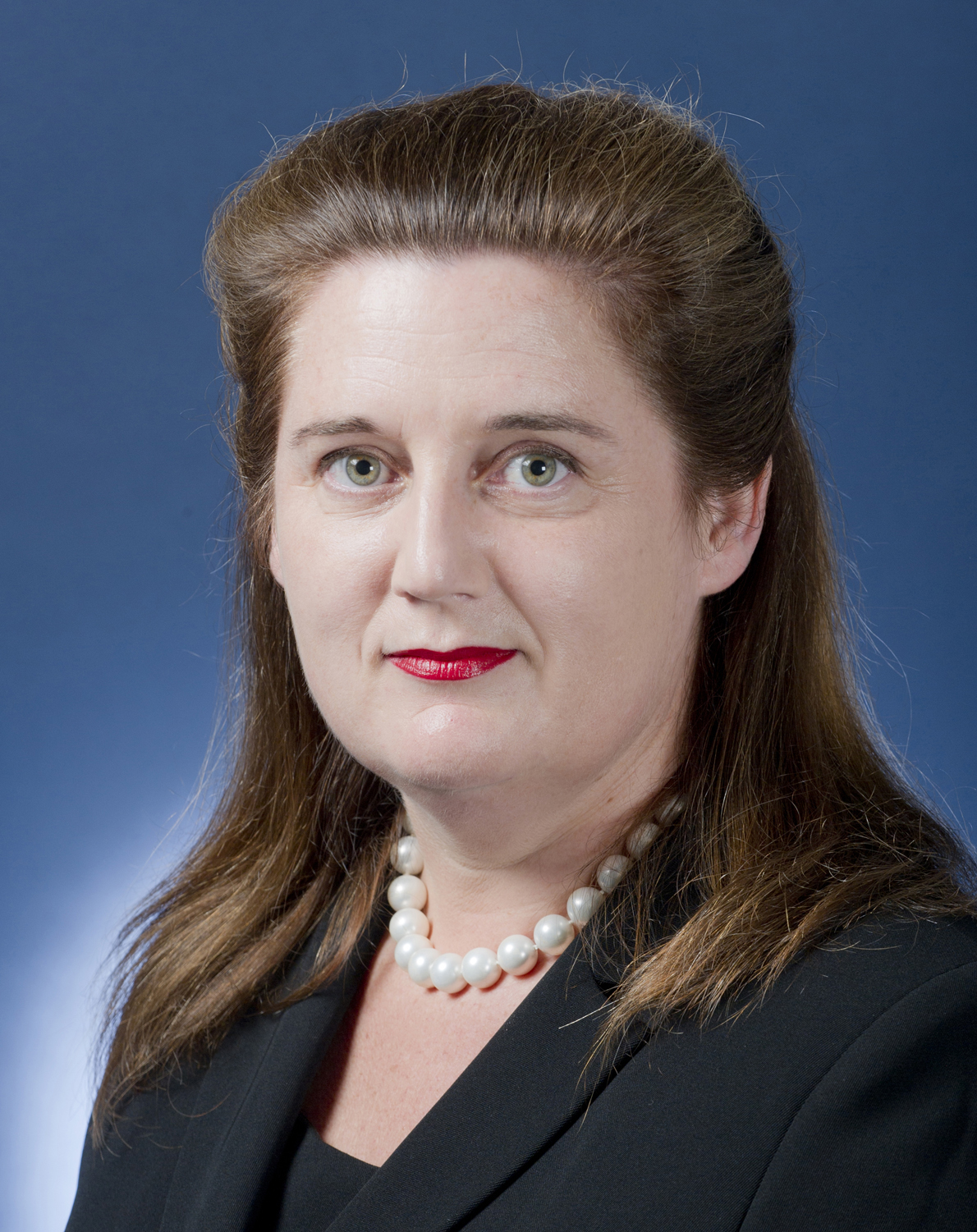

Australian Ambassador to the United Arab Emirates
- Incumbent
- Assumed office 22 January 2020
- Preceded by: Arthur Spyrou

Australian Ambassador to Jordan
- In office 2012 – 2016

Personal details
- Education: University of Queensland; Australian National University; University of Cambridge
- Profession: Diplomat

Heidi Venamore is an Australian diplomat and a painter of botanical art. She was Australia's Ambassador to Jordan from 2012 to 2016 and Australian Ambassador to the United Arab Emirates from 2020 to 2024. Venamore also painted Australia's official gift to Queen Elizabeth II on the occasion of the latter's platinum jubilee. In 2023, Venamore was awarded the Defence Overseas Service Medal. In 2024, she became the chair of the council of England's Marlborough College.

== Early life and education ==
Venamore obtained a bachelor of arts and a bachelor of laws from the University of Queensland. She also obtained a master of laws (LLM) in international law from the University of Cambridge and a graduate diploma in foreign affairs and trade from the Australian National University.

== Career ==
=== Foreign Affairs ===
Venamore began her career at the Department of Foreign Affairs and Trade serving in various roles, including as an executive in the legal branch. Her overseas postings included Deputy Head of Mission in Baghdad, Head of Political and Trade branch in London, and Head of Mission in Amman. She was also the Assistant Secretary of the department responsible for Counter Terrorism.

In 2006, Venamore was in the news when her emails were quoted in the Cole Inquiry into Australia's oil-for-wheat scandal. The same year, she was featured in a DFAT exhibition about women in the foreign service, contrasting the treatment of some of the earlier and later female public servants.

In 2012, she was appointed Australian Ambassador to Jordan, serving in the role until 2016. In 2020, she was made Australian Ambassador to the United Arab Emirates, a role in which she served until 2024. In 2021, Venamore led a delegation of top military brass to improve relations with the UAE, meeting with the Minister of State for Defence Affairs.

In 2024, she became the chair of the council for the prominent English public school, Marlborough College.

=== Artist ===
Venamore is also a painter specialising in botanical art. A painting by Venamore was the top piece in a charity auction in Herefordshire in 2017. She also painted two paintings that Jordan gave to Prince Charles on his 70th birthday. She is a fellow of the Linnaean Society.

Venamore painted a painting of roses, that were named for the Queen Elizabeth II. Her painting was Australia's gift to the Queen for the Queen's platinum jubilee. The Queen had the painting hung in her private study.

== Awards and honours ==
In 2004, Venamore was awarded the Public Service Medal (PSM) for foreign service.

In 2023, she was awarded the Defence Overseas Service Medal for the part she played in the evacuation of 4,000 people from Afghanistan in 2021.
