= Hugh Alexander Dunn =

Australian diplomat

Hugh Dunn AO
- Born: Hugh Alexander Dunn; 20 August 1923; Rockhampton, Queensland
- Died: 5 November 2005 (aged 82); Brisbane, Queensland
- Education: University of Queensland; Oxford University
- Occupations: Public servant, diplomat

Hugh Alexander Dunn AO (20 August 1923 – 5 November 2005) was a career Australian diplomat known for his knowledge of China; namely Taiwan (1969–1972) and of the People's Republic of China (1980–1984).

== Biography ==
Dunn was born in Rockhampton, Queensland on 20 August 1923. After completing school at Brisbane Boys' College, he enlisted in the A.I.F., trained in Signals Intelligence and moved with MacArthur's troops through New Guinea and then to the Philippines where the Japanese surrender took place. Returning to Australia after the War, he studied at the University of Queensland. He was awarded a Rhodes Scholarship to Oxford University where he studied classical Chinese language, history and philosophy.

In a public service career of over 30 years, Dunn served in Japan, South Korea, the United States, India and South Vietnam, and was Australian High Commissioner to Kenya, Uganda, and Seychelles, and Ambassador to Ethiopia (1978–1980); Ambassador to Taiwan (1969–1972); Ambassador to Argentina, Uruguay, Paraguay and Peru (1973–1976), and Ambassador to the People's Republic of China (1980–1984). In the 1985 Queen's Birthday Honours he was appointed an Officer of the Order of Australia for "services to the public service, particularly in the field of international relations and in the development of Australian relations with China".

After retiring from public service in 1985, Dunn served as Chairman of the Brisbane China Committee, in this capacity actively furthering Australia's relationship with China. He was also a Visiting Professor in the School of Modern Asian Studies at Griffith University and adjunct professor in the Department of History at the University of Queensland. He wrote extensively on Sino-Australian relations and the teaching of the Chinese language. Dunn died in Brisbane on 5 November 2005 at the age of 82.

== Published works ==
- "The Shaping of a Sinologue of Sorts". Australian in Asia Series No. 1. Dr. Nancy Viviani (Ed.).Centre for the Study of Australian-Asian Relations. Griffith University, 1988.
- "Conversations on Tibet with His Holiness the Dalai Lama and Tibetan and Chinese Officials". Australian-Asia Papers No. 38. Dr. Nancy Viviani (Ed.) Centre for the Study of Australian-Asian Relations. Griffith University, 1987.
- Cao Zhi: The life of a Princely Chinese Poet. Beijing, China. New World Press, 1983
- Ts'ao Chih: The life of a Princely Chinese Poet. Taipei, Taiwan. China News, 1970.
- Biography: 'Inventory: Items from a Life well travelled' CD (eBook) 2005. 166pp (incomplete.) Published Brisbane, Australia

Diplomatic posts
Preceded by Harry Bullock	Australian Ambassador to Argentina; Australian Ambassador to Uruguay; Australian Ambassador to Paraguay; 1973–1976	Succeeded by Harry Bullock
Preceded by Harry Bullock	Australian Ambassador to Peru; 1973–1974	Succeeded by Allan Loomes
Preceded by Walter Handmer	Australian High Commissioner to Kenya; Australian Ambassador to Ethiopia; 1977–1979	Succeeded by John Lavett
Preceded by Garry Woodard	Australian Ambassador to China; 1980–1984	Succeeded by Dennis Argall
