= List of ambassadors of Australia to Iraq =

Ambassador of Australia to Iraq

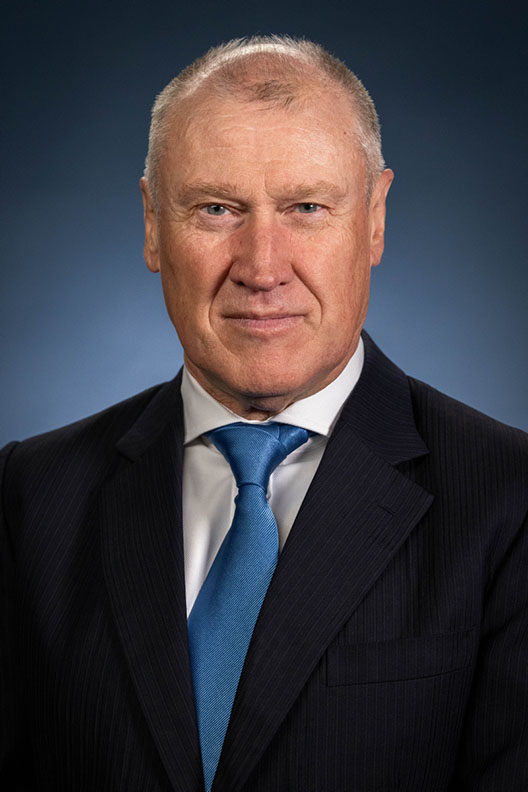
- Incumbent; Glenn Miles since November 2023
- Department of Foreign Affairs and Trade
- Style: His/Her Excellency
- Reports to: Minister for Foreign Affairs
- Residence: Baghdad
- Nominator: Prime Minister of Australia
- Appointer: Governor General of Australia
- Inaugural holder: Pierre Hutton (resident in Beirut)
- Formation: 1974; 52 years ago
- Website: Australian Embassy, Iraq

The ambassador of Australia to Iraq is an officer of the Australian Department of Foreign Affairs and Trade and the head of the Embassy of the Commonwealth of Australia to the Republic of Iraq in Baghdad. The position has the rank and status of an ambassador extraordinary and plenipotentiary and is currently held by Glenn Miles since November 2023.

Iraq and Australia have enjoyed official diplomatic relations since the Australian government of Gough Whitlam recognised the Iraqi Republic in 1973. Contacts between Australia and Iraq however were much earlier, dating back to British Mandatory Iraq and the British Protectorate Kingdom of Iraq from 1935.

On 2 December 1973, Foreign Minister Don Willesee announced that Iraq and Australia would establish diplomatic relations with the Australian Ambassador in Beirut to be accredited to Iraq. A resident Ambassador was not appointed until 1976, with Neil Truscott becoming the first resident Ambassador in early 1977. With the Iraqi invasion of Kuwait starting the First Gulf War in August 1990, relations between the two countries became severely strained and diplomatic relations were severed in January 1991 with the withdrawal of Ambassador Peter Lloyd immediately prior to Operation Desert Storm. Relations remained severed until the overthrow of the regime of Saddam Hussein and the establishment of the Australian Mission in Baghdad on 3 May 2003, immediately following the 2003 invasion of Iraq. This was upgraded to an embassy 29 June 2004 following the transfer of sovereign authority to the Iraqi Interim Government.

== Heads of mission ==
Ordinal	Officeholder	Title	Residency	Term start date	Term end date	Time in office	Notes
1	Pierre Hutton	Ambassador of Australia to Iraq	Beirut, Lebanon	1974	1975	0–1 years	
2	Peter Curtis	Ambassador of Australia to Iraq	Beirut, Lebanon	1975	October 1976	0–1 years	
n/a	J. M. Starey	Chargé d'affaires	Baghdad	October 1976	1977	0–1 years	
3	Neil Truscott	Ambassador of Australia to Iraq	Baghdad	1977	1979	1–2 years	
4	J. M. Starey	Ambassador of Australia to Iraq	Baghdad	1979	1981	1–2 years	
5	A. L. Vincent	Ambassador of Australia to Iraq	Baghdad	1981	1983	1–2 years	
6	Miles Kupa	Ambassador of Australia to Iraq	Baghdad	1983	1986	2–3 years	
7	Rory Steele	Ambassador of Australia to Iraq	Baghdad	1986	1989	2–3 years	
8	Peter Lloyd	Ambassador of Australia to Iraq	Baghdad	1989	January 1991	1–2 years	
Relations suspended
9	Neil Mules	Head of Mission	Baghdad	3 May 2003	29 June 2004	1 year, 5 months	
9	Neil Mules	Ambassador of Australia to Iraq	Baghdad	29 June 2004	October 2004	1 year, 5 months	
10	Howard Brown	Ambassador of Australia to Iraq	Baghdad	October 2004	August 2006	1 year, 10 months	
11	Marc Innes-Brown	Ambassador of Australia to Iraq	Baghdad	August 2006	August 2008	2 years	
12	Robert Tyson	Ambassador of Australia to Iraq	Baghdad	August 2008	August 2011	3 years	
13	Lyndall Sachs	Ambassador of Australia to Iraq	Baghdad	August 2011	20 July 2015	3 years, 11 months	
14	Christopher Langman	Ambassador of Australia to Iraq	Baghdad	20 July 2015	10 January 2018	2 years, 174 days	
15	Dr Joanne Loundes	Ambassador of Australia to Iraq	Baghdad	10 January 2018	16 December 2020	2 years, 341 days	
16	Paula Ganly	Ambassador of Australia to Iraq	Baghdad	16 December 2020	16 November 2023	5 years, 341 days	

== See also ==
- Foreign relations of Australia
