= Pierre Hutton =

Australian diplomat (1928–2014)

- Born: Pierre Norman Bruce Hutton; 16 July 1928; Tasmania
- Died: 20 July 2014 (aged 86)
- Education: University of Tasmania (BComm)
- Occupations: Public servant, diplomat
- Spouse: Judy

Pierre Norman Bruce Hutton (16 July 1928 – 20 July 2014) was an Australian diplomat.

== Personal life ==
Born on 16 July 1928 in Tasmania, Hutton was educated at St Virgil's College and the University of Tasmania. Graduating with a Bachelor of Commerce in 1948, Hutton joined the Commonwealth Public Service in the Department of External Affairs in 1949 as a diplomatic cadet.

Hutton died on 20 July 2014.

== Career ==
Hutton's early overseas posts were to Bangkok, Rangoon, Ottawa and New Caledonia.

After heading the Department's Malaysian/Indonesian section (1962–1964) and a posting as First Secretary to Geneva (1964–1967), in October 1967, Hutton was appointed the Department's public information officer, responsible for assisting Australian media report accurately on foreign affairs, from the Australian angle. He declined to be photographed by The Canberra Times in his first week in the role. He headed a team of three public information officers, all with diplomatic backgrounds. From the role as public information officer, Hutton was appointed High Commissioner to Nigeria in February 1970—his first post as head of mission.

He was Ambassador to Lebanon from 1973 to 1975, in the lead-up to the start of the Lebanese Civil War. Arriving in April 1973, within days Hutton and his family were in the midst of fighting. His wife and four of his five children were forced to hide in the basement of a school for 11 hours, with teachers and other pupils, while Palestinians and units of the Lebanese Army exchanged fire above. During his posting in Beirut, Hutton was also appointed the first non-resident ambassador to Iraq (in 1974) and to Jordan and Syria (in 1975).

Hutton was later an Ambassador to Egypt, the Sudan and finally to Switzerland, where he was also Representative to the UN Human Rights Commission.

== Bibliography ==
- The Legacy of Suez: An Australian diplomat in the Middle East, Macquarie University Middle East Centre, 1996, ISBN 1864082909
- After the Heroic Age and Before Australia's Rediscovery of Southeast Asia, Griffith University Faculty of International Business and Politics, Centre for the Study of Australia-Asia Relations, 1997, ISBN 0868578916

Diplomatic posts
Preceded by John Stanley Cumpston	Australian Consul in Noumea; 1958	Succeeded by R. B. Hodgson
Preceded by H.D. White	Australian High Commissioner to Nigeria; 1970–1972	Succeeded by W.H. Bray
Preceded by Neil Truscott	Australian Ambassador to Lebanon; 1973–1975	Succeeded by Peter Curtis
New title Position established	Australian Ambassador to Iraq; 1974–1975	Succeeded by Peter Curtis
New title Position established	Australian Ambassador to Syria; 1975	Succeeded by Peter Curtis
New title Position established	Australian Ambassador to Jordan; 1975	Succeeded by Peter Curtis
Preceded by Robin Ashwin	Australian Ambassador to Egypt; 1978–1981	Succeeded by Frank Murray
Preceded by Keith Brennan	Australian Ambassador to Switzerland; 1981–1985	Succeeded by Douglas Townsend
