= Jeremy Hearder =

Australian author, historian, diplomat and public servant

- Born: 1936 (age 89–90); Peshawar, Pakistan
- Education: University of Melbourne; Stanford University
- Occupations: Diplomat, public servant, author, historian

Jeremy Victor Roblin Hearder (born 1936) is an Australian author and historian, and former diplomat and public servant.

He held several international postings for the Australian Department of Foreign Affairs, including Laos, Tanzania, Thailand, Kenya, Belgium, Zimbabwe, Fiji, the United States and New Zealand. He was Australia's first High Commissioner to Zimbabwe (1980–84) and is the author of the biography Jim Plim: Ambassador Extraordinary (2015). He also served as the Department's Chief of Protocol.

== Life and career ==
Born in 1936 in Peshawar, India (later Pakistan), Hearder was the son of one of three founders of the Australian Secret Intelligence Service, former British army officer Roblin Hearder. The younger Hearder joined the Department of External Affairs in January 1959.

In 1980, Hearder was appointed the first High Commissioner to Zimbabwe, shortly after Zimbabwe's independence. Retaining his High Commissioner position, in 1981 Hearder was accredited High Commissioner to Botswana, and in 1982 he was accredited also as Australia's first Ambassador to Mozambique. In 1984, after his posting in Harare came to an end, Hearder moved to Suva, Fiji, to take up a second High Commissioner posting.

Hearder was Consul-General in Chicago from 1988 to 1991, responsible for promoting Australian trade and investment to America's mid-west.

In 2015, Hearder launched his book, Jim Plim: Ambassador Extraordinary, a biography of diplomat James Plimsoll whom Hearder had worked with in the late 1970s in Brussels. Reviewing the book, Philip Flood wrote that Hearder had done justice to Plimsoll's career as a great Australian ambassador.

== Works ==
- Jim Plim: Ambassador Extraordinary: A Biography of Sir James Plimsoll, Connor Court Publishing, 2015, ISBN 9781925138498

Diplomatic posts
New title Post established	Australian High Commissioner to Zimbabwe; 1980–1984	Succeeded by Alan Edwards
Preceded by K.R. Douglas-Scott	Australian High Commissioner to Botswana; 1981–1984	Succeeded by Alan Edwards
New title Post established	Australian Ambassador to Mozambique; 1982–1984	Succeeded by Alan Edwards
Preceded by Colin McDonald	Australian High Commissioner to Fiji; 1984–1986	Succeeded by John Piper
Preceded by Terry McCarthy	Australian Consul-General in Chicago; 1988–1990	Succeeded by K.I. Gates
