= Rory Steele =

Australian writer

- Born: 1943 (age 82–83); Western Australia
- Occupations: Author, public servant

Rory Steele is an Australian author and former public servant and diplomat.

Born 1943 in Western Australia. Oxford University 1962–66 (BA Hons Modern Languages). Taught Italian in Naples 1964–65. In 1969 he joined the Australian Diplomatic Service and had overseas postings in Ghana, South Korea, Egypt and Switzerland (Geneva). From 1986 to 1988 he was Australian ambassador to Iraq and from 1997 to 2001 was ambassador to Italy. In 2007 he won the ACT Writing and Publishing Awards fiction category for his book entitled Ghosts in the Helmet Trees.

== Bibliography ==
- Ghosts in the Helmet Trees, Ginninderra Press, Canberra, 2006, ISBN 978-1-74027-383-1
- Obverse and Parallel Lines, Indigo Press, Canberra, 2004, ISBN 978-1-74027-243-8
- Academy of the Superfluous, Ginninderra Press, Canberra, 2006, ISBN 978-1-74027-324-4
- Diaspora Parliaments (co-authored with Bruno Mascitelli and Simone Battiston), Connor Court Publishing, Ballan, Victoria, 2010, ISBN 978-1-921421-88-4
- The Loveliness of Terror, 2012
- The Heart and the Abyss – The Life of Felice Benuzzi, Connor Court, Queensland, 2016, ISBN 9781925501049
- Il cuore e l'abisso – La vita di Felice Benuzzi, Alpine Studio, Lecco, 2017, ISBN 978-88-99340-38-4
- Ben O'Dowd – Hero of Kapyong, Hesperian Press, Perth, Western Australia, 2019, ISBN 978-0-85905-752-3

Diplomatic posts
Preceded by Miles Kupa	Australian Ambassador to Iraq; 1986–1988	Succeeded by P.J. Lloyd
Preceded by Lance Joseph	Australian Ambassador to Italy; 1997–2001	Succeeded by Murray Alexander Cobban
