= Victoria Owen =

Australian public servant and diplomat

- Born: 1949
- Died: 2008 (aged 58)
- Education: University of Melbourne (BA (Hons))
- Occupations: Public servant, diplomat

Victoria Mary Owen (1949–2008) was an Australian public servant and diplomat.

Owen joined the Department of Foreign Affairs in 1972. Her early postings were to Greece and Amman. While her then husband Donald Kingsmill was ambassador to Saudi Arabia (1976–1979), Owen learned Arabic. In the period, she also gave birth to two daughters, in September 1976 and in July 1978. A third child followed, a son, in 1984.

She moved into her first ambassadorial role in 1990, as Australian Ambassador to Syria, with non-resident accreditation to Lebanon, living in Damascus until 1992. She served a second time as an ambassador from 1998 to 2002, this time as Ambassador to Egypt, with non-resident accreditation to Sudan and Algeria. Whilst living in Egypt she was one of only five women ambassadors from 140 embassies in Cairo.

Owen died in 2008 after a battle against cancer.

In 2010, Victoria Owen Circuit, in the Canberra suburb of Casey, was named in her honour.

Diplomatic posts
Preceded by J.E. Rawson as Chargé d'affaires	Australian Ambassador to Syria; Australian Ambassador to Lebanon; 1990–1992	Succeeded by Paul Robilliard
Preceded by Michael Smith	Australian Ambassador to Egypt; Australian Ambassador to Sudan; 1998–2002	Succeeded by Robert Newton
Preceded by John Spender	Australian Ambassador to Algeria; 1998–2002	Succeeded by Robert Newton
Preceded by Janet Gardiner	Australian Ambassador to Syria; 1999–2002	Succeeded by Robert Newton
