= Alison Chartres =

Australian diplomat

Alison Chartres is an Australian diplomat. She was the Australian High Commissioner to Kenya since August 10, 2017 and was also accredited to Burundi, Rwanda, Somalia, Tanzania and Uganda, as well as the East African Community (EAC), the United Nations Environment Programme (UNEP), and the United Nations Human Settlements Programme (UN-Habitat).

Her father worked as an assistant farm manager in Kenya.
