= List of ambassadors of Australia to the United Arab Emirates =

Ambassador of Australia to the United Arab Emirates

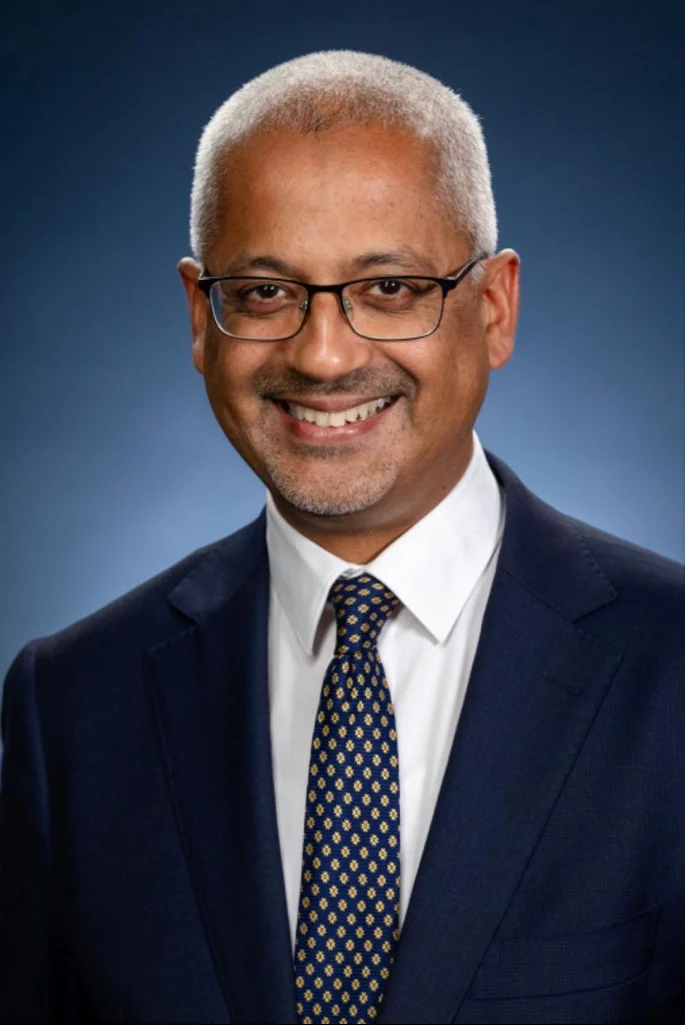
- Incumbent; Ridwaan Jadwat since 29 January 2024
- Department of Foreign Affairs and Trade
- Style: His Excellency
- Reports to: Minister for Foreign Affairs
- Residence: Abu Dhabi
- Nominator: Prime Minister of Australia
- Appointer: Governor General of Australia
- Inaugural holder: Ian Haig (Resident in Saudi Arabia)
- Formation: 1975
- First holder: John Hines (Resident in Abu Dhabi)

The Ambassador of Australia to the United Arab Emirates is an officer of the Australian Department of Foreign Affairs and Trade and the head of the Embassy of the Commonwealth of Australia to the United Arab Emirates. The ambassador resides in Abu Dhabi. The current ambassador, since January 2024, is Ridwaan Jadwat.

== List of ambassadors ==
#	Officeholder	Residency	Term start date	Term end date	Time in office	Notes
1	Ian Haig	Riyadh, Saudi Arabia	1975	1976	0–1 years	
2	Donald Kingsmill	Riyadh, Saudi Arabia	1976	1979	2–3 years	
3	Douglas Sturkey	Riyadh, Saudi Arabia	1979	1984	4–5 years	
4	Alan Brown	Riyadh, Saudi Arabia	1984	1988	3–4 years	
5	Alex McGoldrick	Riyadh, Saudi Arabia	1988	1991	2–3 years	
6	Malcolm Leader	Riyadh, Saudi Arabia	1991	1993	1–2 years	
7	Warwick Weemaes	Riyadh, Saudi Arabia	1993	1996	2–3 years	
8	Philip Knight	Riyadh, Saudi Arabia	1996	1998	1–2 years	
9	George Atkin	Riyadh, Saudi Arabia	1998	1999	0–1 years	
10	John Hines	Abu Dhabi, United Arab Emirates	1999	2002	2–3 years	
11	Noel Campbell	Abu Dhabi, United Arab Emirates	2002	2005	2–3 years	
12	Jeremy Bruer	Abu Dhabi, United Arab Emirates	2005	2009	3–4 years	
13	Doug Trappett	Abu Dhabi, United Arab Emirates	2009	2012	2–3 years	
14	Pablo Kang	Abu Dhabi, United Arab Emirates	2012	2016	3–4 years	
15	Arthur Spyrou	Abu Dhabi, United Arab Emirates	2016	2019	2–3 years	
16	Heidi Venamore	Abu Dhabi, United Arab Emirates	2020	2024	4 years	
17	Ridwaan Jadwat	Abu Dhabi, United Arab Emirates	29 January 2024	Incumbent	2 years, 221 days	
