= Alex McGoldrick =

Australian author and former public servant

- Born: Ballarat
- Education: Australian National University
- Occupation: Diplomat

Alexander J. McGoldrick is an Australian author and a former public servant and diplomat. He was Australian Ambassador to Saudi Arabia from 1988 to 1991, during the Gulf War.

== Life and career ==
McGoldrick was born in Ballarat. He graduated from the Australian National University.

In the late 1970s, McGoldrick was a first assistance secretary in the Department of Overseas Trade. In 1980, McGoldrick was appointed Senior Trade Commissioner in Brussels.

Between 1985 and 1988, McGoldrick was Australia's Ambassador to the Organisation for Economic Co-operation and Development in Paris. He took up an appointment as Ambassador to Saudi Arabia in 1988. His posting in Riyadh until 1991 included the duration of the Gulf War. In 1989 McGoldrick took part in negotiations regarding the live export trade after Saudi Arabia rejected five shiploads of Australian live sheep.

McGoldrick self-published his book A Memoir of Arabia in 2010. The book offers an account of the time he spent in the Middle East during the Gulf War. In 2011 it was highly commended by judges for the ACT Writers Centre awards.

== Literary works ==
- McGoldrick, Alex (2002). Two Families. ISBN 0958022607.
- McGoldrick, A. J. (2010). A Memoir of Arabia. ISBN 9780958022613.

Diplomatic posts
| Preceded by Fred Argy | Australian Ambassador to the OECD in Paris; 1985–1988 | Succeeded by Ed Visbord |
| Preceded by Alan Brown | Australian Ambassador to Saudi Arabia; Australian Ambassador to Bahrain; Australian Ambassador to the United Arab Emirates; Australian Ambassador to Yemen; Australian Ambassador to Oman; 1988–1991 | Succeeded by Malcolm Leader |
