= List of ambassadors of Australia to Zimbabwe =

Ambassador of Australia to Zimbabwe

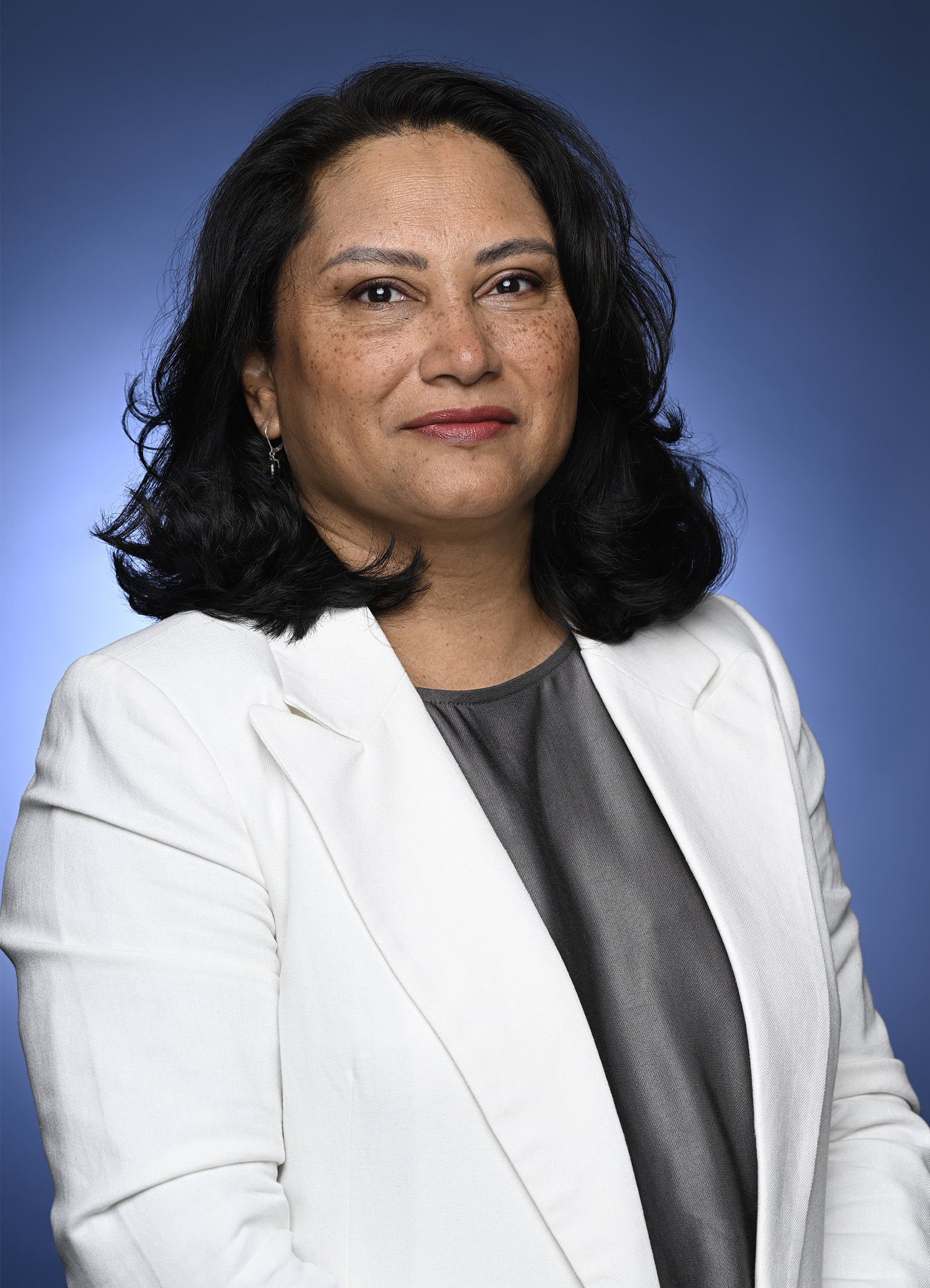
- Incumbent; Minoli Perera since 22 March 2023
- Department of Foreign Affairs and Trade
- Style: Her Excellency
- Reports to: Minister for Foreign Affairs
- Residence: 1 Green Close, Borrowdale, Harare
- Nominator: Prime Minister of Australia
- Appointer: Governor General of Australia
- Inaugural holder: Charles Mott (Special Representative); Jeremy Hearder (High Commissioner)
- Formation: 18 April 1980
- Website: Australian Embassy Zimbabwe

The ambassador of Australia to Zimbabwe, known from 1980 to 2003 as the high commissioner of Australia to Zimbabwe, is an officer of the Australian Department of Foreign Affairs and Trade and the head of the Embassy of the Commonwealth of Australia to the Republic of Zimbabwe. The position has the rank and status of an ambassador extraordinary and plenipotentiary and is currently held by Minoli Perera since 22 March 2023. The ambassador also holds non-resident accreditation as high commissioner to Zambia and Malawi (since 1991), and as ambassador to the Democratic Republic of Congo (since 1998), and the Republic of the Congo (since 2015). Non-resident accreditation has also previously been held for Botswana (1981–2004), Mozambique (1982–2004), Angola (1990–2010), and Namibia (1990–2004).

== Posting history ==
The first official Australian presence in Zimbabwe dates back to December 1954, when an Office of the Australian Trade Commission was established in Salisbury, the capital of the British Colony of Southern Rhodesia and the Federation of Rhodesia and Nyasaland, as a response to increasing Australian business interest and activity in the region. The Assistant Trade Commissioner in South Africa, Gordon Knight, was appointed the first Trade Commissioner to the Federation in Salisbury. The Trade Commission office remained until its closure in December 1965, following Rhodesia's Unilateral Declaration of Independence on 11 November 1965.

Following the conclusion of the Lancaster House Agreement that would allow for the independence of Zimbabwe in December 1979, an Australian Liaison Office (headed by career diplomat Charles Mott as the Special Representative) was established in Salisbury on 23 December 1979, to "assist the Ceasefire Monitoring Contingent and election observers with political support and advice, and to serve as a direct point of contact between the Australian Government and the British Authorities in Salisbury." With the formal independence of Zimbabwe and the election of a new government under Prime Minister Robert Mugabe, the Australian Liaison Office was formally upgraded to the status of High Commission from 18 April 1980. The first Australian high commissioner to Zimbabwe, Jeremy Hearder, presented his letters of commission to the President of Zimbabwe, Canaan Banana, on 15 May 1980. On 13 August 1981, Hearder was appointed as the non-resident high commissioner to Botswana, taking the post over from the Australian Embassy in South Africa. Hearder also received non-resident accreditation as Australia's first ambassador to Mozambique from 7 June 1982.

Relations between the two countries began to sour when the government in Zimbabwe began its controversial land reform programme, occupying farms owned by members of Zimbabwe's white minority, sometimes by force. Following evidence of violence and intimidation in the 2002 Presidential election, Australian Prime Minister John Howard, alongside South African president, Thabo Mbeki, and the Nigerian president, Olusegun Obasanjo, led efforts which resulted in Zimbabwe's suspension from the Commonwealth of Nations in 2002–2003. With the voluntary departure of Zimbabwe from Commonwealth of Nations on 7 December 2003, the High Commission became an Embassy.

=== Zambia high commission ===
The Australian High Commission to Zambia in Lusaka, was opened on 1 August 1980 with the appointment of Michael Potts as the first acting high commissioner. However, from 18 May 1972 until 24 February 1983 the high commissioner resident in Dar-Es-Salaam, Tanzania, remained accredited to the country. When the first resident high commissioner in Zambia, Ian James, was appointed in February 1983, responsibility for relations with Malawi, which had been held by the high commissioner to Tanzania since its independence in 1964, was transferred to the new high commission in Lusaka, and he presented credentials as the first high commissioner to Malawi on 1 July 1983. On 30 May 1988, the high commissioner Edwin Ride presented his credentials as non-resident ambassador to the President of Angola, José Eduardo dos Santos, marking the establishment of diplomatic relations between Angola and Australia. When the high commission was closed for budgetary reasons on 14 June 1991, responsibility for relations with Zambia, alongside non-resident accreditation for Malawi and Angola, was transferred to the High Commission in Harare.

== Heads of mission ==
#	Officeholder	Title	Other offices	Term start date	Term end date	Time in office	Notes
–	Charles Mott	Special Representative		23 December 1979	18 April 1980	117 days	
1	Jeremy Hearder	High Commissioner	^{A}^{B}	18 April 1980	26 February 1984	3 years, 314 days	
2	Alan Edwards	High Commissioner	^{A}^{B}	26 February 1984	15 November 1987	3 years, 262 days	
3	Philip Peters	High Commissioner	^{A}^{B}^{C}	15 November 1987	4 April 1990	2 years, 140 days	
4	Jonathon Thwaites	High Commissioner	^{A}^{B}^{C}^{D}^{E}^{F}	4 April 1990	1 February 1994	3 years, 303 days	
5	Kerry Sibraa	High Commissioner	^{A}^{B}^{C}^{D}^{E}^{F}^{G}	1 February 1994	24 February 1998	4 years, 23 days	
6	Denise Fisher	High Commissioner	^{A}^{B}^{C}^{D}^{E}^{F}^{G}	24 February 1998	2 March 2001	3 years, 6 days	
7	Jonathan Brown	High Commissioner	^{A}^{B}^{C}^{D}^{E}^{F}^{G}	2 March 2001	7 December 2003	3 years, 107 days	
7	Jonathan Brown	Ambassador	^{A}^{B}^{C}^{D}^{E}^{F}^{G}	7 December 2003	17 June 2004	3 years, 107 days	
8	Jon Sheppard	Ambassador	^{D}^{E}^{F}^{G}	17 June 2004	8 August 2007	3 years, 52 days	
9	John Courtney	Ambassador	^{D}^{E}^{F}^{G}	8 August 2007	22 October 2010	3 years, 75 days	
10	Matthew Neuhaus	Ambassador	^{D}^{E}^{G}	22 October 2010	6 March 2015	4 years, 135 days	
11	Suzanne McCourt	Ambassador	^{D}^{E}^{G}^{H}	6 March 2015	8 January 2018	2 years, 308 days	
12	Bronte Moules	Ambassador	^{D}^{E}^{G}^{H}	12 April 2018	January 2023	4 years, 283 days	
13	Minoli Perera	Ambassador	^{D}^{E}^{G}^{H}	22 March 2023	Incumbent	3 years, 232 days	

=== Resident High Commissioners to Zambia ===
#	Officeholder	Other offices	Term start date	Term end date	Time in office	Notes
–	Michael Potts (Acting)		1 August 1980	24 February 1983	2 years, 207 days	
5	Ian James	^{E}	7 January 1983	3 October 1986	3 years, 269 days	
6	Edwin Ride	^{E}^{F}	3 October 1986	29 September 1988	1 year, 362 days	
7	Helen Ware	^{E}^{F}	29 September 1988	May 1991	2 years, 7 months	
8	D. L. Holt	^{E}^{F}	May 1991	14 June 1991	1 month	

=== Notes ===
A. Also non-resident High Commissioner to Botswana, 1981–2004.
B. Also non-resident Ambassador (1982–1995) and High Commissioner (1995–2004) to Mozambique.
C. Also non-resident High Commissioner to Namibia, 1990–2004.
D. Also non-resident High Commissioner to Zambia, 1991–present.
E. Also non-resident High Commissioner to Malawi, 1983–1991 (Lusaka), 1991–present (Harare).
F. Also non-resident Ambassador to Angola, 1988–1991 (Lusaka), 1991–2010 (Harare).
G. Also non-resident Ambassador to the Democratic Republic of the Congo, 1998–present.
H. Also non-resident Ambassador to the Republic of the Congo, 2015–present.

== See also ==
- Australia–Zimbabwe relations
