= List of high commissioners of Australia to Mauritius =

High Commissioner of Australia to Mauritius

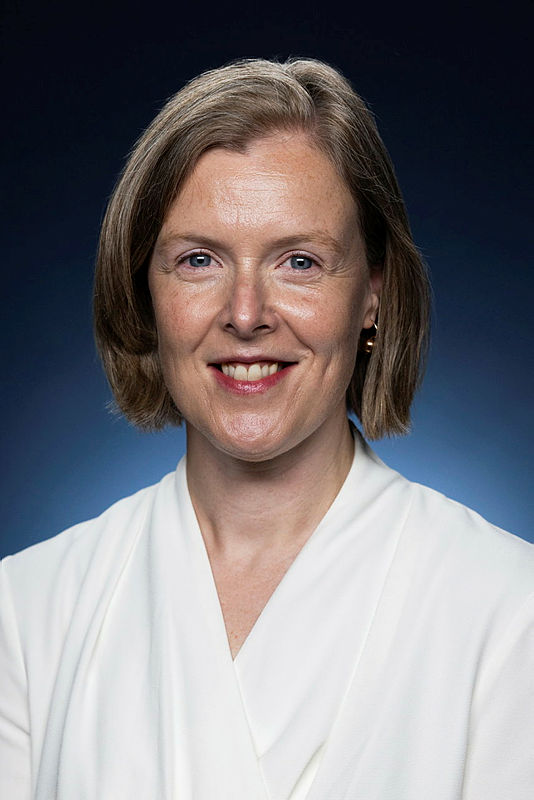
- Incumbent; Kate Chamley since 20 January 2024
- Department of Foreign Affairs and Trade
- Style: Her Excellency
- Reports to: Minister for Foreign Affairs
- Seat: Rogers House, Port Louis
- Nominator: Prime Minister of Australia
- Appointer: Governor General of Australia
- Inaugural holder: Bill Landale
- Formation: 25 September 1971
- Website: Australian High Commission, Mauritius

The high commissioner of Australia to Mauritius is an officer of the Australian Department of Foreign Affairs and Trade and the head of the High Commission of the Commonwealth of Australia to Mauritius in Port Louis. The first non-resident Australian high commissioner to Mauritius was appointed in 1971, located in Tanzania, and resident diplomatic representation was first established in 1984. The position has the rank and status of an ambassador extraordinary and plenipotentiary and also holds non-resident accreditation to Seychelles (since 1984, as high commissioner), Madagascar (since 1984, as ambassador), and Comoros (since 1984, as ambassador), as well as having consular responsibility for the island of Réunion, an overseas department and region of France. The position is currently vacant, with the head of mission being Keara Shaw as acting high commissioner and chargé d’affaires since 1 August 2022. The work of the high commissioner is supported by the Australian Consulate in Antananarivo, Madagascar, led by honorary consul Scott Reid since November 2016.

== Posting history ==
On 25 September 1971, Australia established diplomatic relations with Mauritius, with the high commissioner resident in Dar es Salaam, Tanzania receiving non-resident accreditation until 1984. From 1976 to 1984 the high commissioner in Kenya was accredited to the Seychelles. On 29 April 1976, it was announced that Australia and Madagascar had agreed to establish diplomatic relations, with the Australian high commissioner to Tanzania receiving non-resident accreditation as ambassador. The first ambassador, Frederick Truelove, presented his credentials on 3 May 1976. In 1983, non-resident accreditation was briefly held by the Tanzania high commission for Comoros. With the establishment of the High Commission in Port Louis, the non-resident accreditations for Seychelles, Comoros, and Madagascar, were transferred to the Mauritius post.

In early 1984, the new Australian Government of Bob Hawke undertook a policy of increased engagement with the states of the Indian Ocean. In January 1984 Foreign Minister Bill Hayden noted in a press release that Australia has an important role in "ensuring secure lines of communications for its trade with and civil aviation traffic through the region, and in promoting regional concern for peace and stability. Australia would also become increasingly important to the region as a trading partner and as a source of aid, training, technology and investment." As part of this new policy, in February 1984 it was announced that a resident high commission was to be established in the island state of Mauritius, which had been an independent member of the Commonwealth since 1968. The resident Australian High Commission to Mauritius was opened on 24 March 1984, initially under an acting high commissioner. The first resident high commissioner, Rod Irwin, took up his appointment in September 1984, and presented his letters of commission on 10 September 1984.

In November 2016, the Australian Consulate in Antananarivo, Madagascar, was established, with local Australian-born businessman Scott Reid appointed as honorary consul, and was officially opened by Susan Coles as ambassador to Madagascar on 7 May 2017.

== High commissioners ==
#	Officeholder	Residency	Other offices	Term start date	Term end date	Time in office	Notes
1	Bill Landale	Dar es Salaam, Tanzania	n/a	25 September 1971	December 1972	1 year, 2 months	
2	John Forsythe	Dar es Salaam, Tanzania	n/a	January 1973	August 1975	2 years, 7 months	
3	Frederick Truelove	Dar es Salaam, Tanzania	^{A}	August 1975	December 1978	3 years, 4 months	
4	Edwin Ride	Dar es Salaam, Tanzania	^{A}	January 1979	January 1982	3 years	
5	John Baker	Dar es Salaam, Tanzania	^{A}^{B}	January 19842	24 March 1984	2 years, 2 months	
−	Perry Nolan (Acting)	Port Louis	^{A}^{B}	24 March 1984	September 1984	5 months	
6	Rod Irwin	Port Louis	^{A}^{B}^{C}	September 1984	June 1986	1 year, 9 months	
7	Ian James	Port Louis	^{A}^{B}^{C}	July 1986	May 1990	3 years, 10 months	
8	Gordon Miller	Port Louis	^{A}^{B}^{C}	May 1990	September 1993	3 years, 4 months	
9	Mary McCarter	Port Louis	^{A}^{B}^{C}	September 1993	June 1997	3 years, 9 months	
10	Christopher Marchant	Port Louis	^{A}^{B}^{C}	June 1997	December 2000	3 years, 6 months	
11	Jeffrey Scougall	Port Louis	^{A}^{B}^{C}	January 2001	February 2004	3 years, 1 month	
12	Ian McConville	Port Louis	^{A}^{B}^{C}	February 2004	April 2007	3 years, 2 months	
13	Catherine Johnstone	Port Louis	^{A}^{B}^{C}	April 2007	1 December 2010	3 years, 8 months	
14	Sandra Vegting	Port Louis	^{A}^{B}^{C}	January 2011	March 2014	3 years, 2 months	
15	Susan Coles	Port Louis	^{A}^{B}^{C}	March 2014	July 2017	3 years, 4 months	
16	Jenny Dee	Port Louis	^{A}^{B}^{C}	July 2017	July 2020	3 years	
17	Kate O’Shaughnessy	Port Louis	^{A}^{B}^{C}	August 2020	31 July 2022	1 year, 11 months	
−	Keara Shaw (Acting)	Port Louis	^{A}^{B}^{C}	1 August 2022	Incumbent	4 years, 37 days	

=== Notes ===
^A Also non-resident Ambassador to Madagascar, 1976–1984, 1984–present.
^B Also non-resident Ambassador to Comoros, 1983–1984, 1984–present.
^C Also non-resident High Commissioner to the Seychelles, 1984–present.
