= Ian Haig =

Ian Haig AM
- Born: Ian Maurice Haig; 13 December 1935; Perth, Western Australia
- Died: 10 March 2014 (aged 78)
- Education: University of Adelaide (BA)
- Occupations: Public servant, diplomat
- Spouse: Beverley Dunning (m. 1959–2014)

Ian Maurice Haig AM (13 December 1935 – 10 March 2014) was an Australian public servant and diplomat.

== Life and career ==
Born in Perth on 13 December 1935, Haig moved with his mother and brother to Adelaide as a young boy when his father enlisted to serve in the 2nd AIF. He was educated at Pulteney Grammar School before going on to study for a Bachelor of Arts at the University of Adelaide.

In February 1974, Haig was appointed Australia's first Ambassador to Saudi Arabia. In August 1975, Haig was also appointed non-resident Australian Ambassador to the United Arab Emirates.

In 1978, Haig was one of 20 candidates for Liberal preselection for the casual vacancy caused by the retirement of New South Wales senator Bob Cotton. He was defeated by Chris Puplick by a single vote.

In 1986, Haig was chairman of Power International, a technology company.

Haig was made a Member of the Order of Australia in 1988 for his services to international relations.

Diplomatic posts
| New title Position established | Australian Ambassador to Saudi Arabia; 1974–1976 | Succeeded by Donald Kingsmill |
| New title Position established | Australian Ambassador to the United Arab Emirates; 1975–1976 | Succeeded by Donald Kingsmill |
| Preceded by H.D. White | Australian Commissioner to Hong Kong; 1976–1979 | Succeeded by Ian Nicholson |
