= Joanne Loundes =

Australian economist and diplomat

Joanne Loundes, a public sector economist, is the Australian Ambassador to Iraq (since March 2018).

Loundes earned a Doctor of Philosophy from the University of Melbourne and a Bachelor of Economics from Murdoch University.
