= List of ambassadors of Australia to Egypt =

Ambassador of Australia to Egypt

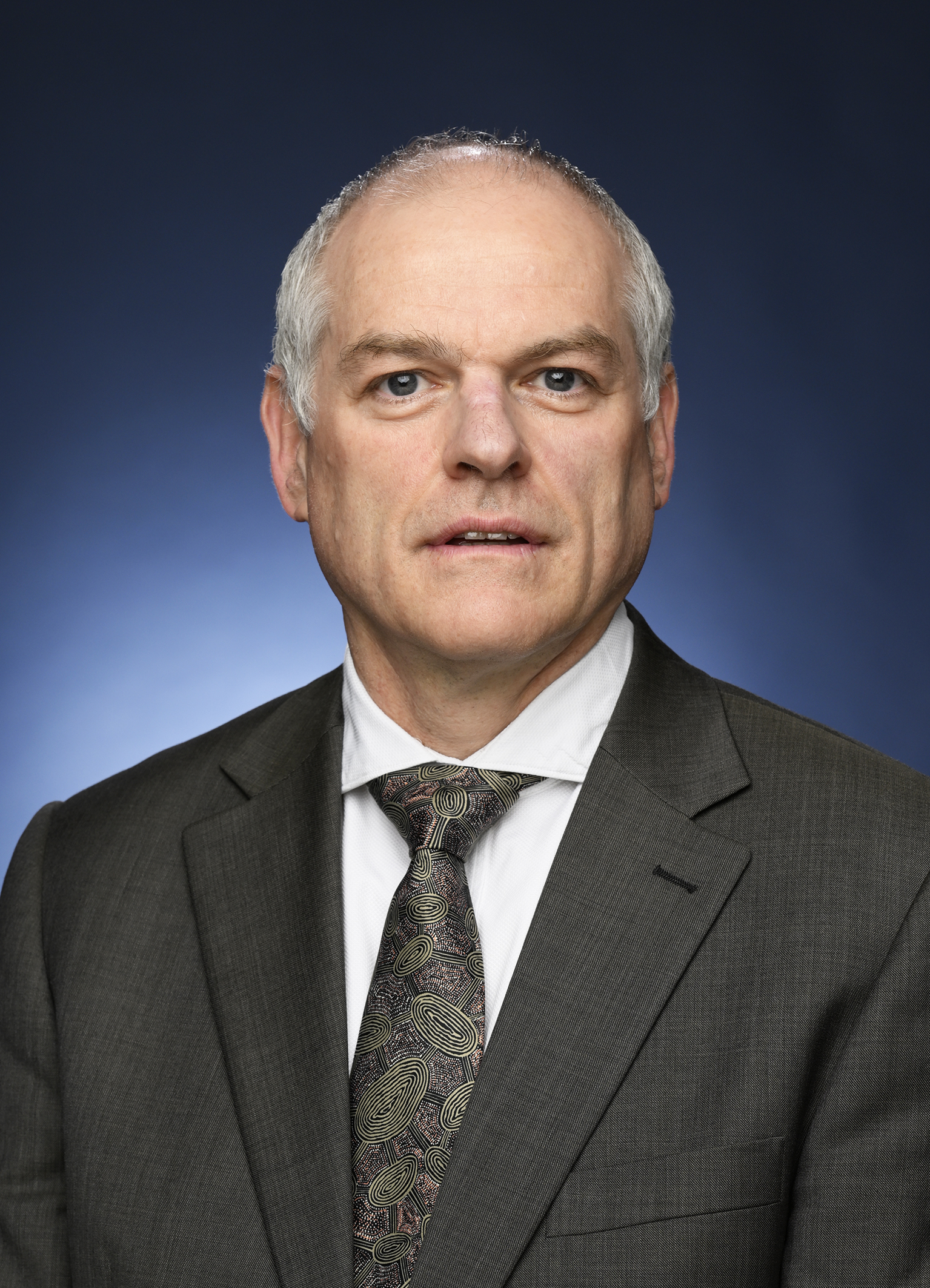
- Incumbent; Axel Wabenhorst since 30 September 2022
- Department of Foreign Affairs and Trade
- Style: His Excellency
- Reports to: Minister for Foreign Affairs
- Residence: Cairo
- Nominator: Prime Minister of Australia
- Appointer: Governor-General of Australia
- Inaugural holder: Claude Massey (as Minister to Egypt)
- Formation: 1950
- Website: Australian Embassy Egypt

The Ambassador of Australia to Egypt is an officer of the Australian Department of Foreign Affairs and Trade and the head of the Embassy of the Commonwealth of Australia to the Arab Republic of Egypt. The current ambassador, since November 2018, is Glenn Miles, who resides in Cairo. The Ambassador also holds non-resident accreditation as Ambassador to Eritrea, Syria and Sudan.

== History ==
The first official Australian representative in Egypt was Cyril E. Hughes, who was appointed as trade commissioner in Cairo by the Lyons government in 1936 as part of its expansion of the trade commissioner scheme. He was also given responsibility for Cyprus, Greece, Iran, Iraq, Palestine, the Sudan, Syria and Turkey. Hughes performed a quasi-diplomatic role, sending briefings to the Department of External Affairs on Middle Eastern politics. His successor James Payne remained in the post throughout World War II.

Australia opened its first embassy in the Arab world in Cairo, in 1950. There existed an embassy in Damascus, Syria from 1977 to 1999. Prior to 1977, accreditation for Syria was held by the embassies in Beirut, Lebanon (1973–1976) and Baghdad, Iraq (1976–1977). In 1991, with its independence, accreditation for Eritrea was held by the High Commission in Nairobi, until it was transferred to the embassy in Cairo in 2006.

After the Australian Government closed its post in Syrian embassy in 1999, the Ambassador to Egypt was named responsible for representing Australian interests in Syria.

== List of heads of mission ==
Ordinal	Officeholder	Title	Other offices	Term start date	Term end date	Time in office	Notes
1	Claude Massey	Minister to Egypt		1950	1953	2–3 years	
2	Hugh McClure Smith	Minister to Egypt		1953	1953	1–2 years	
3	Roden Cutler VC, CBE	Minister to Egypt		1955	1957	1–2 years	
Post withdrawn 9 September 1956
4	John Quinn OBE	Minister to Cairo		November 1960	April 1961	1 year	
4	John Quinn OBE	Ambassador to the United Arab Republic		April 1961	November 1961	1 year	
5	Francis Hamilton Stuart	Ambassador to the United Arab Republic		November 1961	March 1966	4 years, 4 months	
6	L. J. Lawrey	Ambassador to the United Arab Republic		March 1966	January 1969	2 years, 10 months	
7	Brian Clarence Hill	Ambassador to the United Arab Republic		January 1969	1971	2–3 years	
7	Brian Clarence Hill	Ambassador of Australia to Egypt		1971	1972	2–3 years	
8	Keith Douglas Scott	Ambassador of Australia to Egypt		June 1972	January 1975	2 years, 7 months	
9	Robin Ashwin	Ambassador of Australia to Egypt		1975	1978	2–3 years	
10	Pierre Hutton	Ambassador of Australia to Egypt		1978	1981	2–3 years	
11	Frank Murray	Ambassador of Australia to Egypt		1981	1984	2–3 years	
12	Kenneth Rodgers	Ambassador of Australia to Egypt		1984	1987	2–3 years	
13	Ian Hutcheons	Ambassador of Australia to Egypt		1987	1990	2–3 years	
14	John Crighton	Ambassador of Australia to Egypt		1990	1993	2–3 years	
15	Colin McDonald	Ambassador of Australia to Egypt		1993	1998	4–5 years	
16	Michael Smith	Ambassador of Australia to Egypt		1995	1998	2–3 years	
17	Victoria Owen PSM	Ambassador of Australia to Egypt	^{A}^{B}	1998	2002	3–4 years	
18	Robert Newton	Ambassador of Australia to Egypt	^{A}^{B}	2002	2005	2–3 years	
19	Bob Bowker	Ambassador of Australia to Egypt	^{A}^{B}^{C}	2005	2008	2–3 years	
20	Stephanie Shwabsky	Ambassador of Australia to Egypt	^{A}^{B}^{C}	2008	2012	3–4 years	
21	Ralph King	Ambassador of Australia to Egypt	^{A}^{B}^{C}	2012	2015	2–3 years	
22	Neil Hawkins	Ambassador of Australia to Egypt	^{A}^{B}^{C}	2015	2018	2–3 years	
23	Glenn Miles	Ambassador of Australia to Egypt	^{A}^{B}^{C}	November 2018	incumbent	7 years, 10 months	

=== Notes ===
^A Also non-resident Ambassador to the Syrian Arab Republic, since 1999.
^B Also non-resident Ambassador to the Republic of the Sudan, since 1999.
^C Also non-resident Ambassador to the State of Eritrea, since 2006.
