= List of ambassadors of Australia to Ethiopia =

Ambassador of Australia to Ethiopia

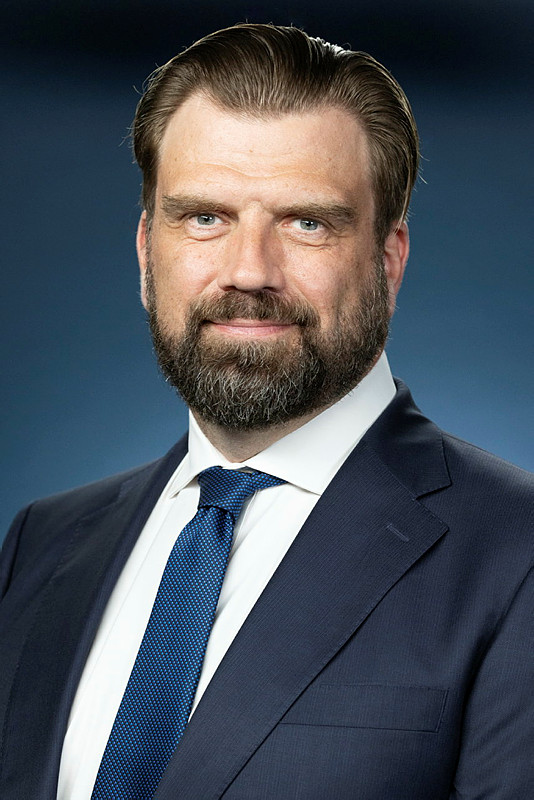
- Incumbent; Peter Hunter since 23 December 2024
- Department of Foreign Affairs and Trade
- Style: Her Excellency
- Reports to: Minister for Foreign Affairs
- Nominator: Prime Minister of Australia
- Appointer: Governor General of Australia
- Inaugural holder: Walter Crocker (Resident in Nairobi, Kenya)
- Formation: September 1965
- Website: Australian Embassy, Ethiopia

The ambassador of Australia to Ethiopia is an officer of the Australian Department of Foreign Affairs and Trade and the head of the Embassy of the Commonwealth of Australia to the Federal Democratic Republic of Ethiopia. The position has the rank and status of an ambassador extraordinary and plenipotentiary, holds non-resident accreditation for Djibouti, South Sudan (since 2011) and the Central African Republic (since 2014), and acts as Australia's representative to the African Union Commission, the United Nations Economic Commission for Africa, and the Intergovernmental Authority on Development.

The ambassador, since October 2021, is Julia Niblett. Ethiopia and Australia have enjoyed diplomatic relations since 1965 when Australia sent Walter Crocker to be High Commissioner to Kenya in Nairobi, with accreditation to Uganda and Ethiopia. Relations with Ethiopia from that time were dealt with by the High Commission in Kenya until 1984 when an embassy was opened in Addis Ababa, with representation to the Organisation of African Unity. This embassy was closed a few years later in 1987 due to budget cuts however and accreditation returned to the High Commission in Nairobi. On 8 September 2010, Lisa Filipetto was appointed as the first resident ambassador to Ethiopia since 1987.

== List of ambassadors ==
| Ordinal | Name | Other offices | Residency | Term start date | Term end date | Time in office | Notes |
|---|---|---|---|---|---|---|---|
| 1 | Walter Crocker | n/a | Nairobi, Kenya | September 1965 | October 1967 | 2 years, 1 month | |
| 2 | Robert Hamilton | n/a | Nairobi, Kenya | November 1967 | December 1970 | 3 years, 1 month | |
| 3 | K. H. Rogers | n/a | Nairobi, Kenya | December 1970 | May 1974 | 3 years, 5 months | |
| 4 | Walter Handmer | n/a | Nairobi, Kenya | May 1974 | November 1977 | 3 years, 6 months | |
| 5 | Hugh Dunn | n/a | Nairobi, Kenya | November 1977 | December 1979 | 2 years, 1 month | |
| 6 | John Lavett | n/a | Nairobi, Kenya | January 1980 | December 1981 | 1 year, 11 months | |
| 7 | Geoffrey White | n/a | Nairobi, Kenya | February 1982 | 11 December 1984 | 2 years, 10 months | |
| (n/a) | Les Luck (Chargée d'affaires) | n/a | Addis Ababa, Ethiopia | 11 December 1984 | May 1985 | 4 months | |
| 8 | Jonathan Sheppard | ^{A} | Addis Ababa, Ethiopia | May 1985 | 1987 | 1–2 years | |
| 9 | Douglas Campbell | n/a | Nairobi, Kenya | 1987 | September 1989 | 1–2 years | |
| 10 | David Goss | n/a | Nairobi, Kenya | September 1989 | January 1993 | 3 years, 4 months | |
| 11 | Lawry Herron | n/a | Nairobi, Kenya | January 1993 | December 1995 | 2 years, 11 months | |
| 12 | John Trotter | n/a | Nairobi, Kenya | January 1996 | January 1998 | 2 years | |
| 13 | Philip Green | n/a | Nairobi, Kenya | January 1998 | January 2001 | 3 years | |
| 14 | Paul Comfort | ^{B} | Nairobi, Kenya | January 2001 | August 2004 | 3 years, 7 months | |
| 15 | George Atkin | ^{B} | Nairobi, Kenya | August 2004 | May 2007 | 2 years, 9 months | |
| 16 | Lisa Filipetto | ^{B} | Nairobi, Kenya | May 2007 | 8 September 2010 | 7 years, 4 months | |
| 16 | Lisa Filipetto | ^{B}^{C}^{E} | Addis Ababa, Ethiopia | 8 September 2010 | 30 September 2014 | 7 years, 4 months | |
| 17 | Mark Sawers | ^{B}^{C}^{D}^{E} | Addis Ababa, Ethiopia | 30 September 2014 | 21 November 2018 | 4 years, 1 month | |
| 18 | Peter Doyle | ^{B}^{C}^{D}^{E} | Addis Ababa, Ethiopia | 21 November 2018 | February 2021 | 2 years, 2 months | |
| (n/a) | Jenny Da Rin (Chargée d’affaires) | n/a | Addis Ababa, Ethiopia | February 2021 | 6 October 2021 | 8 months | |
| 19 | Julia Niblett | ^{B}^{C}^{D}^{E} | Addis Ababa, Ethiopia | 6 October 2021 | incumbent | 5 years, 41 days | |

== Notes ==
^A Also resident Ambassador to the Organisation of African Unity, 1985–1987.
^B Also resident Ambassador to the African Union Commission, since 9 July 2002.
^C Also non-resident Ambassador to the Republic of South Sudan, since 2011.
^D Also non-resident Ambassador to the Central African Republic, since 2014.
^E Also non-resident Ambassador to the Republic of Djibouti, since ????

== See also ==
- Foreign relations of Australia
