= Jane Lambert =

Australian diplomat

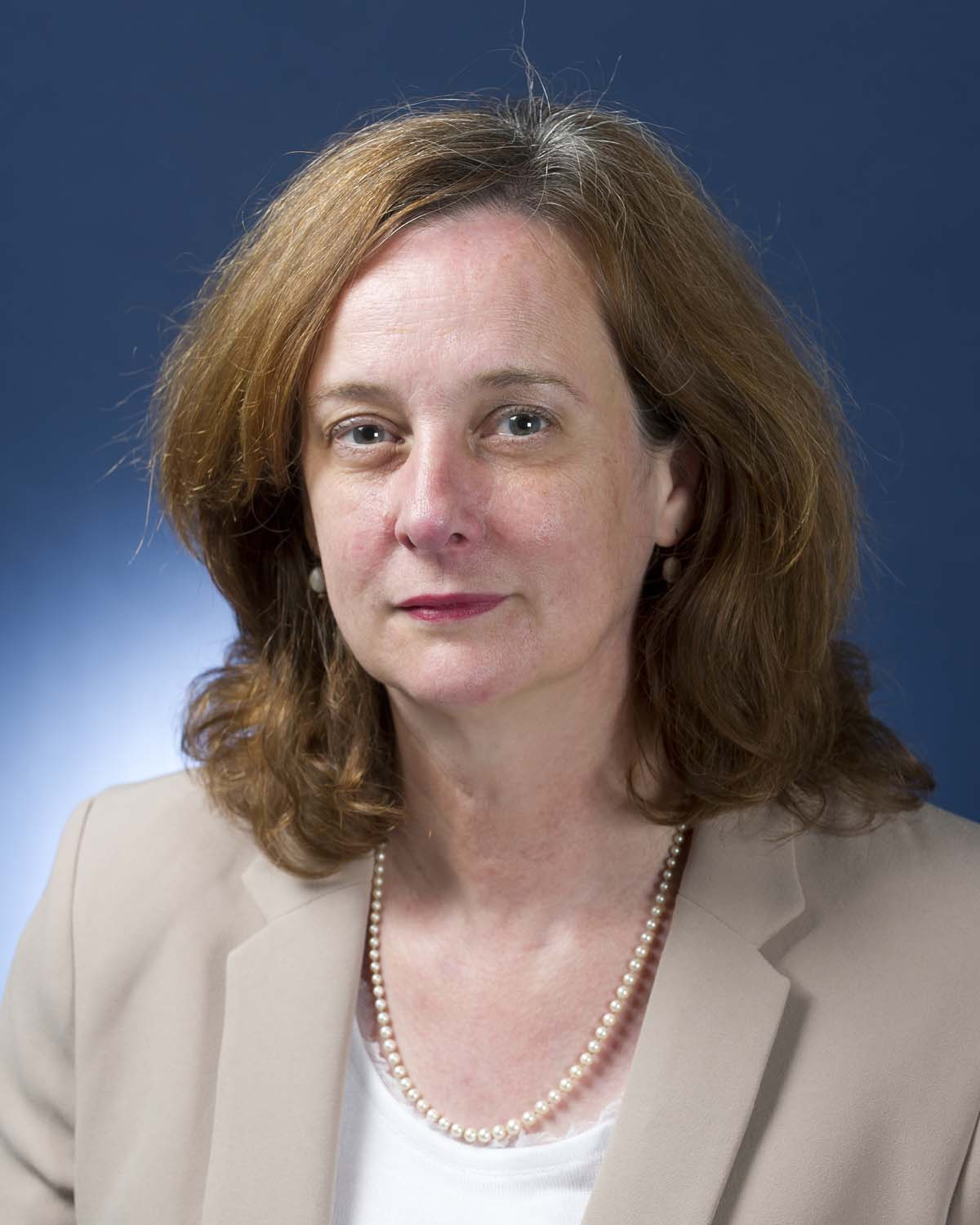
Lambert in 2012

Jane Lambert is the former Australian High Commissioner to Malta with non-resident accreditation as Ambassador to Tunisia (2012–2016). She has also served as Deputy High Commissioner to South Africa, Counselor at the Australian High Commission in Nigeria, and First Secretary at the Australian Embassy to the European Union, Belgium and Luxembourg.

Lambert earned a Bachelor of Arts degree from Flinders University, and a Master of Arts degree in Public Policy from the Australian National University.
