= List of high commissioners of Australia to Kenya =

High Commissioner of Australia to Kenya

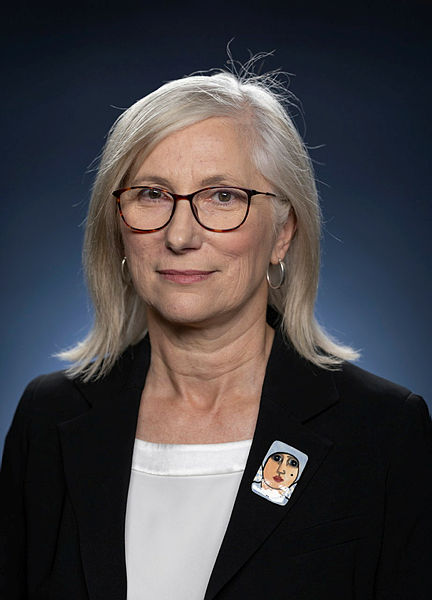
- Incumbent; Jenny Da Rin since 12 November 2023
- Department of Foreign Affairs and Trade
- Style: Her Excellency
- Reports to: Minister for Foreign Affairs
- Residence: Rosslyn, Nairobi
- Seat: Nairobi, Kenya
- Nominator: Prime Minister of Australia
- Appointer: Governor General of Australia
- Inaugural holder: Walter Crocker
- Formation: September 1965
- Website: Australian High Commission, Kenya

The high commissioner of Australia to Kenya is an officer of the Australian Department of Foreign Affairs and Trade and the head of the High Commission of the Commonwealth of Australia to the Republic of Kenya in Nairobi. The position has the rank and status of an ambassador extraordinary and plenipotentiary and also holds non-resident accreditation to Burundi (since 2007), Rwanda (since 2007), Somalia (since 2010), Tanzania (since 1987), and Uganda (since 1965). The high commissioner is also Permanent Representative of Australia to the United Nations Office at Nairobi, including the United Nations Environment Programme and the United Nations Human Settlements Programme, as well as representative to the East African Community and the International Conference on the Great Lakes Region.

The high commissioner is currently Jenny Da Rin since 12 November 2023. The work of the high commissioner is supported by the Australian Consulates in Kampala, Uganda and Dar es Salaam, Tanzania led by honorary consul Patrick Bitature since 2010.

== Posting history ==
With the independence of Uganda on 9 October 1962, Kenya on 12 December 1963, and Zanzibar on 10 December 1963, the responsibility for relations was held by the newly established Australian High Commission in Dar es Salaam, Tanganyika (which merged with Zanzibar to form Tanzania on 22 April 1964), which commenced operations from 17 August 1962. When the High Commission to Tanganyika and the appointment of Anthony Dingle as acting high commissioner was announced on 11 May 1962, the Minister for External Affairs, Sir Garfield Barwick, noted that the opening of the high commission was "an indication of the significance which the Australian Government attached to developing close and cordial relations with the new African countries, especially those within the Commonwealth. In addition to contact with Tanganyika itself, the new Australian mission would offer a means of contact with other important East African territories such as Kenya, Uganda and Zanzibar which were now in a state of rapid political evolution." Australia was represented at the independence celebrations for Uganda (8-10 October 1962) by former cabinet minister Sir Josiah Francis.

On 23 August 1965, the Australian Government announced that a formal agreement on establishing full diplomatic relations had been reached with the Governments of Kenya and Uganda, with Australian High Commission to be established in Nairobi. The first Australian representative was Walter Crocker who was appointed as the resident high commissioner to Kenya, and the non-resident high commissioner to Uganda, and ambassador to Ethiopia.

From 18 May 1972 until 24 February 1983 the high commissioners to Tanganyika/Tanzania was accredited to Zambia. When a resident high commissioner was appointed to Zambia in January 1983, responsibility for relations with Malawi, which had been held by the high commissioner to Tanzania since its independence in 1964, was transferred to the new high commission in Lusaka.

On 25 September 1970, Australia established diplomatic relations with Mauritius, with the high commissioner in Dar es Salaam receiving non-resident accreditation until 1984. From 1976 to 1984 the high commissioner in Kenya was accredited to the Seychelles when it was transferred to the resident High Commission in Mauritius, which was established in March 1984. With the closure of the High Commission in Dar es Salaam on 23 November 1987, accreditation for Tanzania was transferred to the Kenya post. On 29 April 1976, it was announced that Australia and Madagascar had agreed to establish diplomatic relations, with the Australian high commissioner to Tanzania receiving non-resident accreditation as ambassador until it was transferred to the resident high commissioner in Mauritius in 1984. The first ambassador, Frederick Truelove, presented his credentials on 3 May 1976. In 1983, non-resident accreditation was briefly held for Comoros, when it was also transferred to the Mauritius post in 1984.

Although the High Commission in Kenya was originally accredited to Ethiopia on its establishment in 1965, a resident embassy in Addis Ababa was established in December 1984. The embassy was closed in 1987, with accreditation returning to Nairobi until the re-establishment of the Ethiopian embassy in 2010. On 4 May 1993, Australia formally recognised the independence of Eritrea, with non-resident accreditation held by the Nairobi high commission until it was transferred to the Embassy in Cairo in 2006.

In December 2010, the Australian Consulate in Kampala, Uganda, was established, with local businessman Patrick Bitature appointed as honorary consul, and was officially opened by Geoff Tooth as high commissioner to Uganda on 17 August 2011. From 7 March 2012 to 2017, there was an Australian Consulate in Dar es Salaam, headed by local businessman Thierry Murcia as honorary consul.

Following a 2004-05 review of security at Australia's overseas missions, where the Nairobi mission was classified as "high risk", in March 2014 the Joint Parliamentary Standing Committee for Public Works approved construction of a new High Commission chancery on an 11,740-square-metre (126,400 sq ft) greenfield site in the suburb of Rosslyn, Nairobi, designed by Brisbane-based James Cubitt Architects. This replaced the previous High Commission site since 1989 in the Groganville Estate, which no longer met security or amenity requirements.

== High commissioners ==
#	Officeholder	Other offices	Term start date	Term end date	Time in office	Notes
1	Walter Crocker	^{A}^{B}	September 1965	5 November 1967	2 years, 2 months	
−	Richard Gate (Acting)	^{A}^{B}	5 November 1967	4 December 1967	29 days	
2	R. N. Hamilton	^{A}^{B}	4 December 1967	December 1970	2 years, 11 months	
3	Kenneth Rogers	^{A}^{B}	January 1971	May 1974	3 years, 4 months	
4	Walter Handmer	^{A}^{B}^{C}	June 1974	November 1977	3 years, 5 months	
5	Hugh Dunn	^{A}^{B}^{C}	November 1977	December 1979	2 years, 1 month	
6	John Lavett	^{A}^{B}^{C}	January 1980	December 1981	1 year, 11 months	
7	Geoffrey White	^{A}^{B}^{C}	February 1982	May 1986	4 years, 3 months	
8	Douglas Campbell	^{A}^{B}^{D}	May 1986	September 1989	3 years, 4 months	
9	David Goss	^{A}^{B}^{D}	September 1989	January 1993	3 years, 4 months	
10	Lawry Herron	^{A}^{B}^{D}^{L}	January 1993	December 1995	2 years, 11 months	
11	John Trotter	^{A}^{B}^{D}^{L}	January 1996	January 1998	2 years	
12	Philip Green	^{A}^{B}^{D}^{L}	January 1998	January 2001	3 years	
13	Paul Comfort	^{A}^{B}^{D}^{L}	January 2001	August 2004	3 years, 7 months	
14	George Atkin	^{A}^{B}^{D}^{L}	August 2004	May 2007	2 years, 9 months	
15	Lisa Filipetto	^{A}^{B}^{D}^{E}^{F}	May 2007	September 2010	3 years, 4 months	
16	Geoff Tooth	^{A}^{D}^{E}^{F}^{G}	September 2010	December 2014	4 years, 3 months	
17	John Feakes	^{A}^{D}^{E}^{F}^{G}	January 2015	10 August 2017	2 years, 7 months	
18	Alison Chartres	^{A}^{D}^{E}^{F}^{G}	10 August 2017	November 2020	3 years, 2 months	
19	Luke Williams	^{A}^{D}^{E}^{F}^{G}	23 November 2020	12 November 2023	5 years, 288 days	
20	Jenny Da Rin		12 November 2023 -	Incumbent		

=== Resident high commissioners to Tanganyika/Tanzania ===
#	Officeholder	Other offices	Residency	Term start date	Term end date	Time in office	Notes
−	Anthony Dingle (Acting)	n/a	Dar es Salaam, Tanganyika/Tanzania	17 August 1962	12 November 1962	87 days	
1	Hugh Gilchrist	n/a	Dar es Salaam, Tanganyika/Tanzania	12 November 1962	October 1966	3 years, 10 months	
2	Harold Bullock	n/a	Dar es Salaam, Tanganyika/Tanzania	October 1966	February 1970	3 years, 4 months	
3	Bill Landale	^{H}	Dar es Salaam, Tanganyika/Tanzania	February 1970	December 1972	2 years, 10 months	
4	John Forsythe	^{H}^{I}	Dar es Salaam, Tanganyika/Tanzania	January 1973	August 1975	2 years, 7 months	
5	Frederick Truelove	^{H}^{I}^{J}	Dar es Salaam, Tanganyika/Tanzania	August 1975	December 1978	3 years, 4 months	
6	Edwin Ride	^{H}^{I}^{J}	Dar es Salaam, Tanganyika/Tanzania	January 1979	January 1982	3 years	
7	John Baker	^{H}^{I}^{J}^{K}	Dar es Salaam, Tanganyika/Tanzania	January 1982	December 1984	2 years, 11 months	
8	Gordon Miller	n/a	Dar es Salaam, Tanganyika/Tanzania	January 1985	23 November 1987	2 years, 10 months	
Office closed; accreditation transferred to the Nairobi High Commission

=== Notes ===
^A Also non-resident High Commissioner to Uganda, 23 August 1965–present.
^B Also non-resident Ambassador to Ethiopia, 23 August 1965–December 1984 and 1987–2010.
^C Also non-resident High Commissioner to the Seychelles, 1976–March 1984.
^D Also non-resident High Commissioner to Tanzania, 23 November 1987–present.
^E Also non-resident Ambassador to Burundi, 2007–present.
^F Also non-resident Ambassador (2007–2009) and High Commissioner (2009–present) to Rwanda.
^G Also non-resident Ambassador to Somalia, 2010–present.
^H Also non-resident High Commissioner to Mauritius, 25 September 1970–March 1984.
^I Also non-resident High Commissioner to Zambia, 18 May 1972 – 24 February 1983.
^J Also non-resident Ambassador to Madagascar, 3 May 1976–1984.
^K Also non-resident Ambassador to Comoros, 1983–1984.
^L Also non-resident Ambassador to Eritrea, 4 May 1993–2006.

== See also ==
- Australia–Kenya relations
