= List of ambassadors of Australia to Saudi Arabia =

Ambassador of Australia to Saudi Arabia

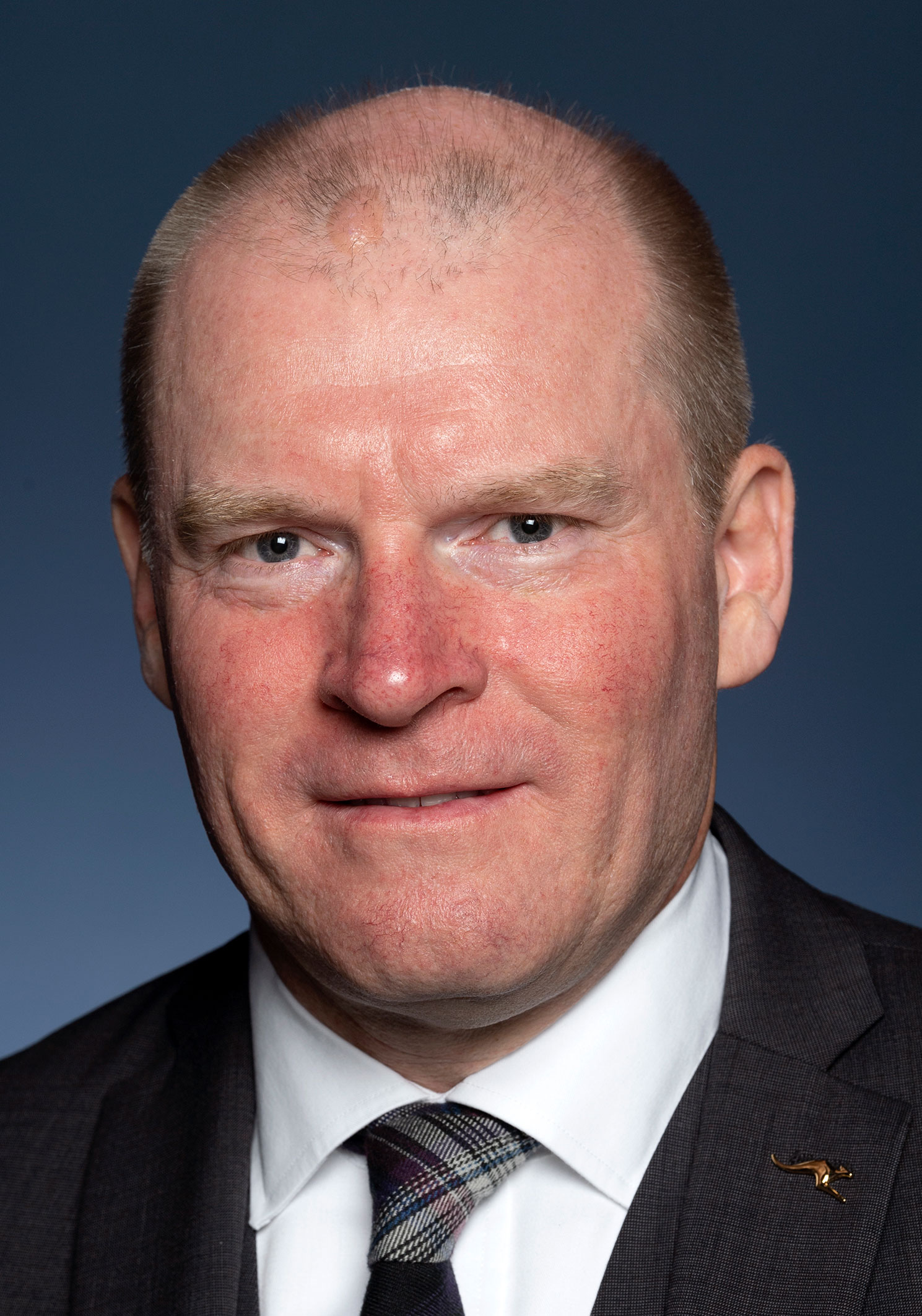
- Incumbent; Mark Donovan since 4 October 2021
- Department of Foreign Affairs and Trade
- Style: His Excellency
- Reports to: Minister for Foreign Affairs
- Residence: Riyadh
- Nominator: Prime Minister of Australia
- Appointer: Governor General of Australia
- Inaugural holder: Ian Haig
- Formation: 1974

The Ambassador of Australia to Saudi Arabia is an officer of the Australian Department of Foreign Affairs and Trade and the head of the Embassy of the Commonwealth of Australia to the Kingdom of Saudi Arabia. The ambassador resides in Riyadh and also holds non-resident accreditation for Bahrain, Oman and Yemen. Australia appointed its first ambassador to Saudi Arabia in 1974.

Initially the embassy was located in Jeddah, and it was moved in 1984 to Riyadh, to comply with a Saudi Government policy directive. The Jeddah post remained open, as a Consulate-General.

The current ambassador, since October 2021, is Mark Donovan.

== List of heads of mission ==
| Ordinal | Officeholder | Other offices | Residency | Term start date | Term end date | Time in office | Notes |
|---|---|---|---|---|---|---|---|
| 1 | Ian Haig | | Jeddah, Saudi Arabia | 1974 | 1976 | 1–2 years | |
| 2 | Donald Kingsmill | | Jeddah, Saudi Arabia | 1976 | 1979 | 2–3 years | |
| 3 | Douglas Sturkey | | Jeddah, Saudi Arabia | 1979 | 1983 | 3–4 years | |
| 4 | Alan Brown | | Jeddah, Saudi Arabia | 1983 | 1984 | 4–5 years | |
| 4 | Alan Brown | | Riyadh, Saudi Arabia | 1984 | 1988 | 4–5 years | |
| 5 | Alex McGoldrick | | Riyadh, Saudi Arabia | 1988 | 1991 | 2–3 years | |
| 6 | Malcolm Leader | | Riyadh, Saudi Arabia | 1991 | 1993 | 1–2 years | |
| 7 | Warwick Weemaes | | Riyadh, Saudi Arabia | 1993 | 1996 | 2–3 years | |
| 8 | Philip Knight | ^{A}^{B}^{C}^{D} | Riyadh, Saudi Arabia | 1996 | 1998 | 1–2 years | |
| 9 | George Aitkin | ^{A}^{B}^{C}^{D} | Riyadh, Saudi Arabia | 1998 | 2000 | 1–2 years | |
| 10 | Bob Tyson | ^{A}^{B}^{C}^{D} | Riyadh, Saudi Arabia | 2000 | 23 December 2004 | 3–4 years | |
| 11 | Ian Biggs | ^{A}^{B} | Riyadh, Saudi Arabia | 2005 | 2008 | 2–3 years | |
| 12 | Kevin Magee | ^{A}^{B}^{C} | Riyadh, Saudi Arabia | 2008 | 2011 | 2–3 years | |
| 13 | Neil Hawkins | ^{A}^{B} | Riyadh, Saudi Arabia | 2011 | 2015 | 3–4 years | |
| 14 | Ralph King | ^{A}^{B}^{C} | Riyadh, Saudi Arabia | 2015 | 25 May 2018 | 2–3 years | |
| 15 | Ridwaan Jadwat | ^{A}^{B}^{C} | Riyadh, Saudi Arabia | 25 May 2018 | 2021 | 2–3 years | |
| 16 | Mark Donovan | ^{A}^{B}^{C} | Riyadh, Saudi Arabia | 4 October 2021 | incumbent | 5 years, 41 days | |

=== Notes ===
^A: Also served as non-resident ambassador of Australia to the Kingdom of Bahrain, since 1996.
^B: Also served as non-resident ambassador of Australia to the Sultanate of Oman, since 1996.
^C: Also served as non-resident ambassador of Australia to the Republic of Yemen, from 1998 to December 2007, and since March 2015.
^D: Also served as non-resident ambassador of Australia to the State of Kuwait, from 1998 to December 2004.
