= List of ambassadors of Australia to Lebanon =

Ambassador of Australia to Lebanon

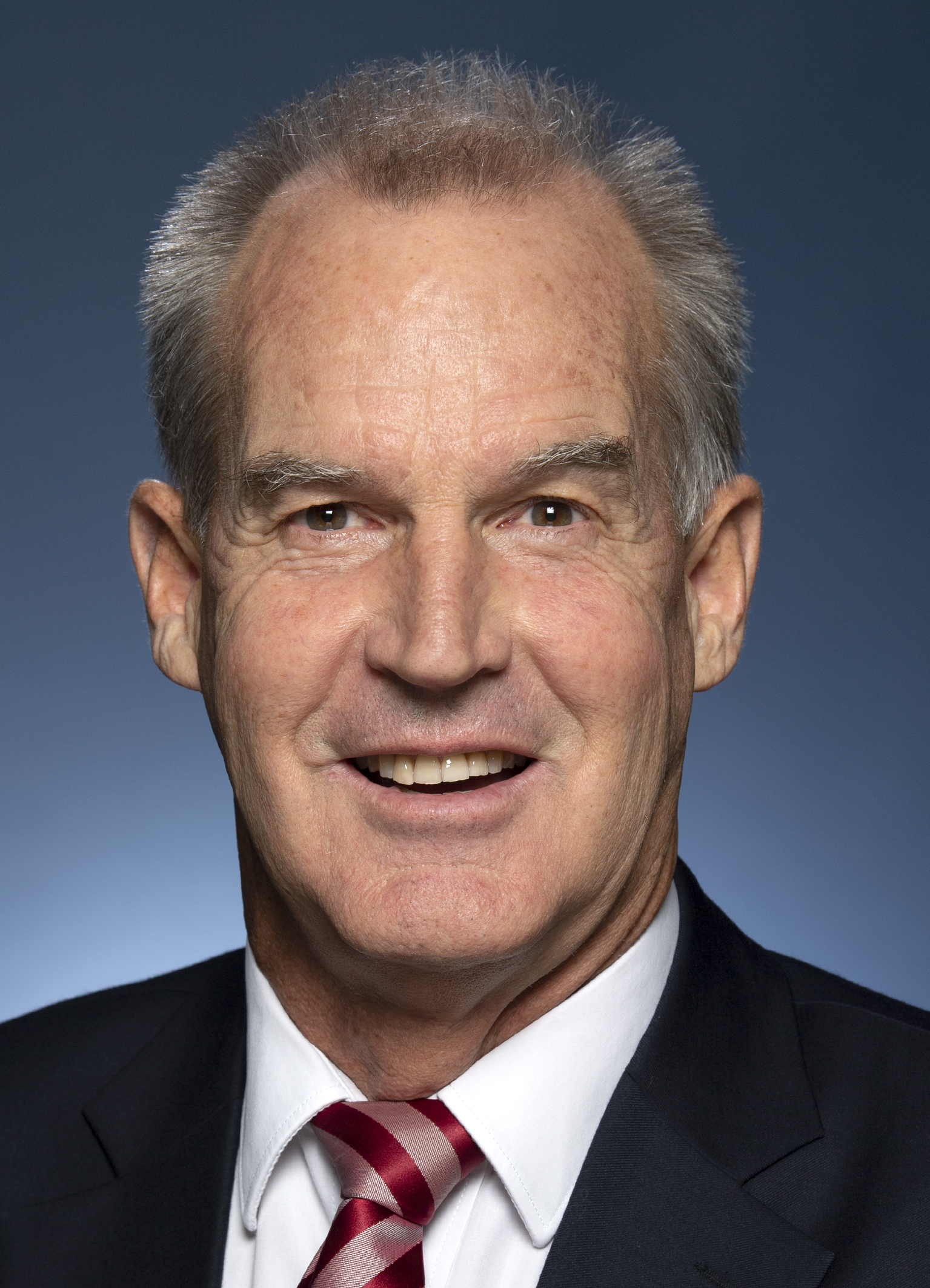
- Incumbent; Andrew Barnes since 13 April 2022
- Department of Foreign Affairs and Trade
- Style: His Excellency
- Reports to: Minister for Foreign Affairs
- Residence: Beirut
- Nominator: Prime Minister of Australia
- Appointer: Governor General of Australia
- Inaugural holder: W. D. Forsyth
- Formation: 1967

The Ambassador of Australia to Lebanon is an officer of the Australian Department of Foreign Affairs and Trade and the head of the Embassy of the Commonwealth of Australia to the Republic of Lebanon. The Ambassador resides in Beirut. The current ambassador, since April 2022, is Andrew Barnes,

== List of heads of mission ==
Ordinal	Officeholder	Title	Other offices	Residency	Term start date	Term end date	Time in office	Notes
(n/a)	D. J. Kingsmill	Chargé d'affaires		Beirut, Lebanon	1967	1967	0 years	
1	Bill Forsyth	Ambassador of Australia to Lebanon		Beirut, Lebanon	1967	1970	2–3 years	
2	Neil Truscott	Ambassador of Australia to Lebanon		Beirut, Lebanon	1970	1973	2–3 years	
3	Pierre Hutton	Ambassador of Australia to Lebanon	^{A}	Beirut, Lebanon	1973	1975	1–2 years	
4	Peter Curtis	Ambassador of Australia to Lebanon	^{A}	Beirut, Lebanon	1975	1976	0–1 years	
(n/a)	J. M. C. Watson	Chargé d'affaires		Damascus, Syria	1977	1978	0–1 years	
(n/a)	D. J. Richardson	Chargé d'affaires		Damascus, Syria	1978	1980	1–2 years	
(2)	Neil Truscott	Ambassador of Australia to Lebanon	^{A}	Damascus, Syria	1978	1983	4–5 years	
5	D. G. Wilson	Ambassador of Australia to Lebanon	^{A}	Damascus, Syria	1983	1984	0–1 years	
6	Ross Burns	Ambassador of Australia to Lebanon		Damascus, Syria	1984	1987	2–3 years	
7	Ray Spurr	Ambassador of Australia to Lebanon		Damascus, Syria	1987	1989	0–1 years	
(n/a)	J. E. Rawson	Chargé d'affaires		Damascus, Syria	1988	1990	1–2 years	
8	Victoria Owen	Ambassador of Australia to Lebanon		Damascus, Syria	1990	1992	1–2 years	
9	Paul Robilliard	Ambassador of Australia to Lebanon		Damascus, Syria	1992	1995	3–4 years	
9	Paul Robilliard	Ambassador of Australia to Lebanon		Beirut, Lebanon	1995	1996	3–4 years	
10	Ian Parmeter	Ambassador of Australia to Lebanon		Beirut, Lebanon	1996	1999	2–3 years	
11	John Fennessy	Ambassador of Australia to Lebanon		Beirut, Lebanon	1999	12002	2–3 years	
12	Stephanie Shwabsky	Ambassador of Australia to Lebanon		Beirut, Lebanon	2002	2006	3–4 years	
13	Lyndall Sachs	Ambassador of Australia to Lebanon		Beirut, Lebanon	2006	2009	2–3 years	
14	Jean Dunn	Ambassador of Australia to Lebanon		Beirut, Lebanon	2009	2010	0–1 years	
15	Lex Bartlem	Ambassador of Australia to Lebanon		Beirut, Lebanon	2010	2014	3–4 years	
16	Glenn Miles	Ambassador of Australia to Lebanon		Beirut, Lebanon	2014	2018	3–4 years	
17	Rebekah Grindlay	Ambassador of Australia to Lebanon		Beirut, Lebanon	October 2018	2022	1–2 years	
18	Andrew Barnes	Ambassador of Australia to Lebanon		Beirut, Lebanon	13 April 2022	incumbent	4 years, 147 days	

=== Notes ===
^A Also served concurrently as non-resident Ambassador of Australia to the Hashemite Kingdom of Jordan, 1979 to 1984.
