= Douglas Sturkey =

Australian diplomat

Robert Douglas Sturkey CVO, AM

7th Official Secretary to the Governor-General of Australia
- In office 1990 – 14 July 1998
- Monarch: Elizabeth II
- Governors-General: Bill Hayden (1990–96); Sir William Deane (1996–98)
- Preceded by: Sir David Smith
- Succeeded by: Martin Bonsey

Personal details
- Born: 7 September 1935 (age 91) Greymouth, New Zealand
- Education: University of Western Australia; Australian National University

Robert Douglas (Doug) Sturkey CVO, AM (born 7 September 1935) is a former Australian diplomat and Official Secretary to the Governor-General of Australia. He is currently a visiting fellow at the Australian National University, Canberra.

== Early life ==
Sturkey was born in Greymouth, New Zealand, on 7 September 1935 to James Robert and Jessie Grace Sturkey. The family emigrated to Australia in 1936, where Douglas was educated at Wesley College, Perth, and the University of Western Australia. He graduated with a Bachelor of Arts degree with Honours in 1956.

== Public service ==
Douglas Sturkey was a member of the diplomatic staff of the Department of Foreign Affairs and Trade from 1957 to 1998, during which time he served at seven Australian missions abroad, and at departmental headquarters in Canberra. Senior appointments held include Deputy Permanent Representative to the United Nations, New York; Ambassador to Saudi Arabia and other states in the Arabian Peninsula; and, in Canberra, Principal Adviser responsible for policy advice to the government on matters relating to Australia's relations with South East Asia.

In 1990 he was appointed to succeed Sir David Smith as Official Secretary to the Governor-General of Australia, a position he held until 14 July 1998.

== Academia ==
On his retirement from the Australian Public Service, Sturkey completed a Master of Arts and Doctor of Philosophy within the Centre for Arab and Islamic Studies at the Australian National University, Canberra. His doctoral dissertation was on the Clinton Administration's attempt to effect a comprehensive settlement of the Arab-Israeli dispute.

Sturkey took up an appointment as visiting fellow at the Australian National University in 2004. His research interests are listed as including Middle East politics, the Arab-Israeli dispute, and Gulf security.

== Honours ==
- In the New Years Honours List of January 1995, Sturkey was made a Commander of the Royal Victorian Order (CVO) for his services as the Official Secretary to the Governor-General.
- In the Queen's Birthday Honours List of June 1999, Sturkey was made a Member of the Order of Australia (AM) for his services as the Official Secretary to the Governor-General, to the Australian Diplomatic Service, and to the Canberra community.
- Dr Sturkey is also a Knight of the Most Venerable Order of the Hospital of St John of Jerusalem and is currently a Priory Officer of the Order in Australia, being the Order's Director of Ceremonies.

== Sources ==
- Australian National University
- Government House Annual Report 1997/98

Government offices
Preceded by Sir David Smith	Official Secretary to the Governor-General of Australia; 1990–1998	Succeeded by Martin Bonsey
Diplomatic posts
New title New title	Australian High Commissioner to Malta (Acting); 1967	Succeeded by Hubert Opperman
Preceded by Donald Kingsmill	Australian Ambassador to Saudi Arabia; 1979–1983	Succeeded by Alan Brown
