= List of ambassadors of Australia to Jordan =

Ambassador of Australia to Jordan
- Incumbent; Paula Ganly
- Department of Foreign Affairs and Trade
- Style: Her Excellency
- Reports to: Minister for Foreign Affairs
- Residence: Amman
- Nominator: Prime Minister of Australia
- Appointer: Governor General of Australia
- Inaugural holder: Pierre Hutton (Resident in Lebanon)
- Formation: 29 April 1975
- Website: www.dfat.gov.au/about-us/our-people/homs/ambassador-to-jordan

The Ambassador of Australia to Jordan is an officer of the Australian Department of Foreign Affairs and Trade and the head of the Embassy of the Commonwealth of Australia to the Hashemite Kingdom of Jordan. The Ambassador resides in Amman.

Australia's diplomatic relations with Jordan began when Pierre Hutton, then Ambassador to Lebanon, was accredited as non-resident Ambassador to Jordan on 29 April 1975. A Jordan post was opened in Amman in 1979 with David Wadham named as Chargé d'Affaires while the then non-resident Ambassador, H.N. Truscott, remained in Lebanon. The first resident Ambassador was appointed in 1982, a move in part to ensure that Australia could be more fully informed about developments in the Middle East.

The current Ambassador to Jordan is Paula Ganly.

== List of ambassadors ==
Ordinal	Officeholder	Residency	Term start date	Term end date	Time in office	Notes
1	Pierre Hutton	Beirut, Lebanon	1975	1975	0 years	
2	Peter Curtis	Beirut, Lebanon	1975	1976	0–1 years	
3	J. M. Starey	Beirut, Lebanon	1976	1977	0–1 years	
4	J. P. McCarthy	Beirut, Lebanon	1977	1978	0–1 years	
5	H. N. Truscott	Beirut, Lebanon	1978	1981	2–3 years	
6	David G. Wilson	Beirut, Lebanon	1981	1982	0–1 years	
7	Richard K. Gate	Amman, Jordan	1982	1986	3–4 years	
8	Terry J. Goggin	Amman, Jordan	1986	1989	2–3 years	
9	G. R. T. Bowker	Amman, Jordan	1989	1992	2–3 years	
10	Jonathan P. C. Sheppard	Amman, Jordan	1992	1995	2–3 years	
11	Merry Wickes	Amman, Jordan	1995	1998	2–3 years	
12	Ian W. Russell	Amman, Jordan	1998	2001	2–3 years	
13	John Tilemann	Amman, Jordan	2001	2005	3–4 years	
14	Trevor Peacock	Amman, Jordan	2005	2009	3–4 years	
15	Glenn White	Amman, Jordan	2009	2012	2–3 years	
16	Heidi Venamore	Amman, Jordan	2012	2016	3–4 years	
17	Miles Armitage	Amman, Jordan	July 2016	2020	3–4 years	
18	Bernard Lynch	Amman, Jordan	10 January 2021		5 years, 240 days	
19	Paula Ganly	Incumbent				
