= Sylvester Tetteh =

Ghanaian politician

Hon. Sylvester Tetteh MP
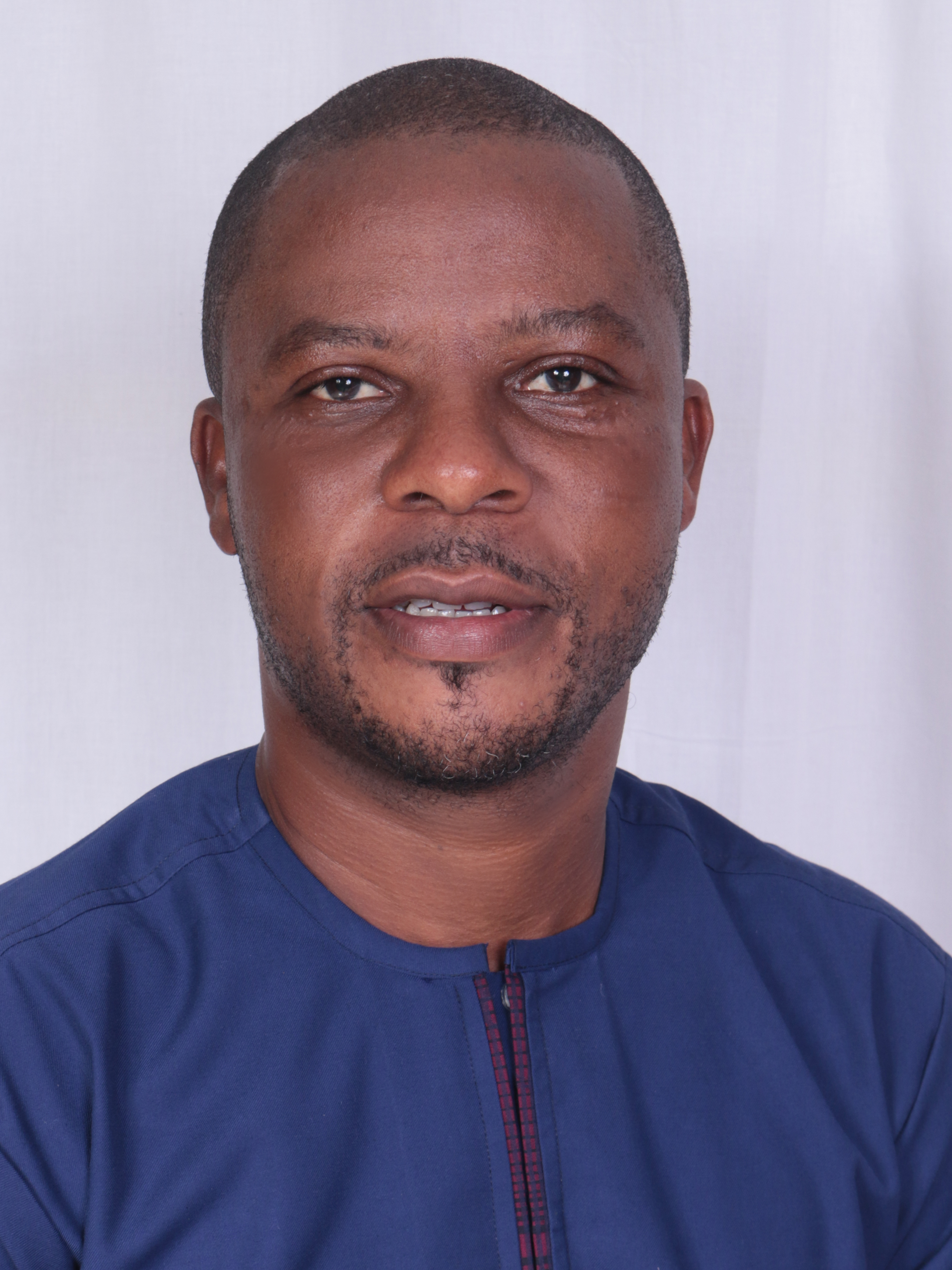

Member of the Ghana Parliament for Bortianor-Ngleshie Amanfro Constituency
- Preceded by: Habib Saad

Personal details
- Born: 7 July 1977 (age 49)
- Party: New Patriotic Party
- Education: Regent University College of Science and Technology

Sylvester Tetteh (born 7 July 1977) is a Ghanaian politician. He is a member of the Eighth Parliament of the Fourth Republic of Ghana representing the Bortianor-Ngleshie Amanfro Constituency in the Ga South Municipal District in the Greater Accra Region of Ghana. He was the former chief executive officer of National Youth Authority (NYA).

== Early life and career ==
Tetteh was born on 7 July 1977. He hails from Old Ningo. He is a graduate of Regent University College of Science and Technology where he was awarded a Bachelor of Science marketing in 2010. In 2019, he was appointed as the chief executive officer of National Youth Authority (NYA) to replace Mr Emmanuel Sin-nyet Asigri, who was sacked because of procurement breaches.

== Politics ==
Tetteh is a member of the New Patriotic party. In the 2012 and 2016 General elections, he contested and lost the Ningo-Prampram constituency seat against Enoch Teye Mensah and Samuel Nartey George of the NDC respectively. In the 2020 NPP parliamentary primaries, Tetteh switch from Ningo-Prampram to contest in Bortianor-Ngleshie Amanfro, where he resides. He won against Habib Saad the incumbent member of parliament. He won the general elections.

=== Committees ===
He serves as the Vice Chairperson and a member of Communication Committee and Local Government and Rural Development Committee respectively in the Eighth Parliament of the Fourth Republic of Ghana.

In September 2021, he was appointed the board chairperson of the board chairman of the Ghana Enterprise Agency by President Nana Akuffo-Addo.

== Personal life ==
He is a Christian.
