= Nartey =

Nartey is a surname. Notable people with the surname include:

- Ebenezer Gilbert Nii Narh Nartey (born 1979), Ghanaian politician
- Eddie Nartey (born 1984), Ghanaian actor, director, and producer
- Emmanuel Nartey (born 1983), Ghanaian judoka
- Emmanuel Ansah Nartey (born 1948), Ghanaian politician
- Felix Nartey, Ghanaian social entrepreneur and open advocate
- Jemima Nartey, Ghanaian volunteer organizer
- Myralyn “Mimi” Nartey (born 1981), also known as Myralyn Osei Agyemang, Ghanaian association football player
- Nii Otu Nartey (born 1952), Ghanaian dental surgeon and professor of oral pathology
- Nikolas Nartey (born 2000), Danish association football player
- Noah Nartey (born 2005), Danish association football player
- Richard Nartey (born 1998), English association football player
- Richard Dornu Nartey (born 1949), Ghanaian politician
- Zuta Mary Nartey (born 1987), Ghanaian javelin thrower

== See also ==
- Nartey Polo (born 1995), Ghanaian association football player
- Sam Nartey George (born 1985), Ghanaian politician
