= Members of the Australian Senate, 2014–2016 =

Members of the Australian Senate, 2014-2016
- ←2011-2014 2016-2019→
- Senate composition at 1 July 2014; Government (33) - (6 seat minority) Liberal (27); National Party (6) Opposition (25); Labor (25) Crossbench (18); Greens (10); Palmer United (3) (Note: Jacqui Lambie resigned from the Palmer United Party to sit as an independent from 24 November 2014. Glenn Lazarus resigned from the Palmer United Party to sit as an independent from 13 March 2015.); Democratic Labour (1) (Note: John Madigan resigned from the DLP on 4 September 2014 and sat thereafter as an independent.); Family First (1); Liberal Democrats (1); Motoring Enthusiast (1); Xenophon (1) Changes in composition

This is a list of members of the Australian Senate between July 2014 and May 2016. Half of the state senators had been elected at the August 2010 election and had terms due to finish on 30 June 2017; the other half of the state senators were elected at the September 2013 election and had terms due to finish on 30 June 2020. The territory senators were elected at the September 2013 election and their terms ended at the dissolution of the House of Representatives, which was May 2016. The new Senate first met in July 2014, with state senators elected in 2013 sworn in on 7 July 2014. Ascertaining the chamber's final composition was complicated by the loss of 1,375 ballot papers in Western Australia, leading to the Court of Disputed Returns voiding the result there, and necessitating a special Senate election in Western Australia (held on 5 April 2014).

All senators' terms were truncated when the double dissolution deadlock provisions were triggered in 2016, leading to the dissolution of all of both houses of parliament on 9 May 2016 which led to a full-senate election, rather than a more common half-senate election, at the 2 July 2016 general election.

Senator	Party	State	Term ending	Years in office
Eric Abetz	Liberal	Tasmania	2017	1994–2022
Chris Back	Liberal	Western Australia	2017	2009–2017
Cory Bernardi	Liberal	South Australia	2020	2006–2020
Catryna Bilyk	Labor	Tasmania	2020	2008–2025
Simon Birmingham	Liberal	South Australia	2020	2007–2025
George Brandis	Liberal (Note: There is no separate LNP party room. Senators Brandis, Lindgren, McGrath and Macdonald sat in the Liberal party room.)	Queensland	2017	2000–2018
Carol Brown	Labor	Tasmania	2020	2005–present
Joe Bullock (Note: Western Australian Senator Joe Bullock resigned from the Senate on 13 April 2016. Pat Dodson was appointed as his replacement on 28 April 2016.)	Labor	Western Australia	2020	2014–2016
David Bushby	Liberal	Tasmania	2020	2007–2019
Doug Cameron	Labor	New South Wales	2020	2008–2019
Matt Canavan	National (Note: There is no separate LNP party room. Senators Canavan and O'Sullivan sat in the National party room.)	Queensland	2020	2014–present
Kim Carr	Labor	Victoria	2017	1993–2022
Michaelia Cash	Liberal	Western Australia	2020	2008–present
Richard Colbeck	Liberal	Tasmania	2020	2002–2016, 2018–present
Jacinta Collins	Labor	Victoria	2020	1995–2005, 2008–2019
Stephen Conroy	Labor	Victoria	2017	1996–2016
Mathias Cormann	Liberal	Western Australia	2017	2007–2020
Sam Dastyari	Labor	New South Wales	2017	2013–2018
Bob Day (Note: On 5 April 2017 the High Court held that South Australian Family First Senator Bob Day had been incapable of sitting as a senator from 26 February 2016 as he had an indirect interest in an agreement with the Commonwealth. The High Court had previously held that the presence of a person who was not validly a senator did not invalidate the proceedings of the Senate.)	Family First	South Australia	2020	2014–2016
Richard Di Natale	Greens	Victoria	2017	2011–2020
Pat Dodson	Labor	Western Australia	2020	2016–2024
Sean Edwards	Liberal	South Australia	2017	2011–2016
John Faulkner (Note: New South Wales Labor Senator John Faulkner resigned from the Senate on 6 February 2015. Jenny McAllister was appointed as his replacement on 6 May 2015.)	Labor	New South Wales	2017	1989–2015
David Fawcett	Liberal	South Australia	2017	2011–2025
Concetta Fierravanti-Wells	Liberal	New South Wales	2017	2005–2022
Mitch Fifield	Liberal	Victoria	2020	2004–2019
Alex Gallacher	Labor	South Australia	2017	2011–2021
Katy Gallagher (Note: Australian Capital Territory Labor Senator Kate Lundy resigned from the Senate on 24 March 2015. Former ACT Chief Minister Katy Gallagher was appointed as her replacement on 25 March 2015.)	Labor	Australian Capital Territory	2016 (Note: The term of a territory senator ends at the dissolution of the House of Representatives, which was July 2016.)	2015–2018, 2019–present
Sarah Hanson-Young	Greens	South Australia	2020	2008–present
Bill Heffernan	Liberal	New South Wales	2017	1996–2016
David Johnston	Liberal	Western Australia	2020	2002–2016
Chris Ketter	Labor	Queensland	2020	2014–2019
Jacqui Lambie	Palmer United/Ind (Note: Tasmanian Senator Jacqui Lambie resigned from the Palmer United Party on 24 November 2014 and sat thereafter as an independent.)	Tasmania	2020	2014–2017
Glenn Lazarus	Palmer United/Ind (Note: Queensland Senator Glenn Lazarus resigned from the Palmer United Party on 13 March 2015 and sat thereafter as an independent.)	Queensland	2020	2014–2016
David Leyonhjelm	Liberal Democrats	New South Wales	2020	2014–2019
Joanna Lindgren (Note: Queensland LNP Senator Brett Mason resigned from the Senate on 26 March 2015. Joanna Lindgren was appointed as his replacement on 21 May 2015.)	Liberal	Queensland	2017	2015–2016
Sue Lines	Labor	Western Australia	2017	2013–present
Scott Ludlam	Greens	Western Australia	2020	2008–2017
Joe Ludwig	Labor	Queensland	2017	1999–2016
Kate Lundy	Labor	Australian Capital Territory	2016	1996–2015
Ian Macdonald	Liberal	Queensland	2020	1990–2019
John Madigan	Democratic Labour/Ind/MFP (Note: Victorian Senator John Madigan resigned from the DLP on 4 September 2014 and sat thereafter as an independent.)	Victoria	2017	2011–2016
Gavin Marshall	Labor	Victoria	2020	2002–2019
Brett Mason	Liberal	Queensland	2017	1999–2015
Jenny McAllister	Labor	New South Wales	2017	2015–present
Anne McEwen	Labor	South Australia	2017	2005–2016
James McGrath	Liberal	Queensland	2020	2014–present
Bridget McKenzie	National	Victoria	2017	2011–present
Nick McKim (Note: Tasmanian Greens Senator Christine Milne resigned from the Senate on 10 August 2015. Nick McKim was appointed as her replacement on 19 August 2015.)	Greens	Tasmania	2017	2015–present
Jan McLucas	Labor	Queensland	2017	1999–2016
Christine Milne	Greens	Tasmania	2017	2005–2015
Claire Moore	Labor	Queensland	2020	2002–2019
Ricky Muir	Motoring Enthusiast	Victoria	2020	2014–2016
Fiona Nash	National	New South Wales	2017	2005–2017
Deborah O'Neill (Note: New South Wales Labor Senator Bob Carr resigned on 24 October 2013, after the election in September 2013, creating two vacancies, the balance of his term & the new term to end on 30 June 2020. On 13 November 2013 Deborah O'Neill, who had lost her House of Representatives seat at the 2013 federal election, was appointed to the vacancy from 24 October 2013 to 30 June 2014. On 2 July 2013 O'Neill was appointed to the vacancy in the new term to 30 June 2020.)	Labor	New South Wales	2020	2013–present
Barry O'Sullivan	National	Queensland	2020	2014–2019
Stephen Parry	Liberal	Tasmania	2017	2005–2017
James Paterson (Note: Victorian Liberal Senator Michael Ronaldson resigned from the Senate on 28 February 2016. James Paterson was appointed as his replacement on 9 March 2016.)	Liberal	Victoria	2017	2016–present
Marise Payne	Liberal	New South Wales	2020	1997–2023
Nova Peris	Labor	Northern Territory	2016	2013–2016
Helen Polley	Labor	Tasmania	2017	2005–present
Linda Reynolds	Liberal	Western Australia	2020	2014–2025
Lee Rhiannon	Greens	New South Wales	2017	2011–2018
Janet Rice	Greens	Victoria	2020	2014–present
Michael Ronaldson	Liberal	Victoria	2017	2005–2016
Anne Ruston	Liberal	South Australia	2017	2012–present
Scott Ryan	Liberal	Victoria	2020	2008–2021
Nigel Scullion	National (Note: Northern Territory Senator Nigel Scullion sat as the sole representative of the Country Liberal Party, the local equivalent of both the National and Liberal parties. He sat in the National party room, and served as the National Party deputy leader in the Senate.)	Northern Territory	2016	2001–2019
Zed Seselja	Liberal	Australian Capital Territory	2016	2013–2022
Rachel Siewert	Greens	Western Australia	2017	2005–2021
Robert Simms (Note: South Australian Greens Senator Penny Wright resigned from the Senate on 10 September 2015. Robert Simms was appointed as her replacement on 22 September 2015.)	Greens	South Australia	2017	2015–2016
Lisa Singh	Labor	Tasmania	2017	2011–2019
Arthur Sinodinos	Liberal	New South Wales	2020	2011–2019
Dean Smith	Liberal	Western Australia	2017	2012–present
Glenn Sterle	Labor	Western Australia	2017	2005–present
Anne Urquhart	Labor	Tasmania	2017	2011–present
Dio Wang	Palmer United	Western Australia	2020	2014–2016
Larissa Waters	Greens	Queensland	2017	2011–2017, 2018–present
Peter Whish-Wilson	Greens	Tasmania	2020	2012–present
John Williams	National	New South Wales	2020	2008–2019
Penny Wong	Labor	South Australia	2020	2002–present
Penny Wright	Greens	South Australia	2017	2011–2015
Nick Xenophon	Nick Xenophon Team	South Australia	2020	2008–2017
