= Gregory Andrews =

Australian civil servant

Australian High Commissioner to Ghana and West Africa
- In office 26 June 2020 – 25 December 2021
- Monarch: Elizabeth II
- Prime Minister: Scott Morrison
- Preceded by: Andrew Barnes
- Succeeded by: Berenice Owen-Jones

Personal details
- Born: 1968 (age 57–58) Sydney, New South Wales, Australia
- Education: University of Newcastle (BEc); Australian National University (MA)
- Occupation: Businessman and environmental activist

Gregory Andrews is an Australian activist, businessman, and former diplomat. He was Australia's first Threatened Species Commissioner, and was the former Australian High Commissioner to Ghana and West Africa.

He gained national attention in 2006 due to his controversial appearance on the Australian Broadcasting Corporation (ABC) program Lateline, where he assumed an anonymous pseudonym and made allegations about child sexual abuse in Indigenous communities in the Northern Territory.

== Early life and education ==
Gregory Andrews was born in Sydney, New South Wales in 1968 and is a Dharawal man of shared Aboriginal and European ancestry.

He holds a Master of Arts (Foreign Affairs and Trade) from the Australian National University and a Bachelor of Economics, majoring in econometrics, with First Class Honours from the University of Newcastle.

== Career ==
Andrews joined the Department of Foreign Affairs and Trade as a graduate in 1992.

In 2014, Andrews was appointed Threatened Species Commissioner, a position created by the incoming Coalition Government. Environment minister Greg Hunt conceded the role lacked statutory powers and would have to liaise with other agencies.

Andrews served as assistant secretary of the International Organisations Branch. He has previously served overseas as first secretary at the Australian Embassy, Beijing. From 2017 to 2019, Andrews was Australia's national focal point for the Responsibility to Protect and represented Australia in United Nations, bilateral and non-government negotiations on atrocity prevention.

In June 2020 Andrews was appointed as Australia's High Commissioner to Ghana to Ghana and West Africa. His appointment was reportedly marred with controversy based on his support for Ghana's LGBT community and bringing an end to 'witch camps'. On 20 December 2021, it is reported that the Australian Government ended Andrews appointment to Ghana, and he returned home.

Andrews served as Australia's deputy chief climate negotiator to the United Nations.

== Controversy ==
Andrews sparked controversy in 2006 when he appeared, along with five other witnesses including Community Elder Mantjatjara Wilson and Community Doctor Geoff Stewart, on ABC's Lateline under the pseudonym "Anonymous Youth Worker" and claimed that paedophiles were engaging in sex slavery within Indigenous communities in the Northern Territory.

Andrews later gave evidence to the NT coroner in 2005. His allegations were later found to be false by an Australian Crime Commission investigation, contributing to the moral panic that justified the Howard government's Northern Territory Intervention.

The Little Children Are Sacred report published by the Human Rights Commission of Australia found that although there was no evidence to support the claims of "paedophile rings", there was enough evidence to conclude a number of non-aboriginal individuals had been infiltrating aboriginal communities to abuse children, and that there was a "significant problem" in Northern Territory communities in relation to sexual abuse of children.

The NPY Women's Council defended the substance of the Lateline witnesses in an opinion piece in The Australian.

In a statement to ABC News, Andrews claimed to have suffered harassment and abuse from his appearance on Lateline, urging those criticising the program to instead "channel their energy into the protection of women and children".

== Climate activism ==
On 2 November 2023, Andrews begun a hunger strike on the lawns of Australian Parliament House in Canberra, Australia, protesting the lack of government action on climate change. Andrews was taken to hospital after a 16-day hunger strike. His petition received over 4,500 signatures.

From August to September 2024, Andrews set out on a community awareness trip, intending to cycle 4,500 km (2,800 mi) across Australia from west to east on an electric bicycle. In addition to promoting the importance and benefits of renewable energy, Andrews encouraged donations made online will be earmarked to specific projects which help to provide more renewable energy for people living regional and remote areas.

In October 2025 Andrews rode an electric bicycle 700 km (430 miles) from Canberra to Melbourne to deliver a keynote at that year's annual Australian Citizen Science Association conference.
