= Emmanuel Ansah Nartey =

Ghanaian politician

Hon. Emmanuel Ansah Nartey

Member of Parliament of the Upper Manya Krobo constituency
- In office 7 January 1993 – 7 January 1997
- President: Jerry John Rawlings
- Succeeded by: Solomon Tettey Terkper

Personal details
- Born: May 4, 1948 (age 78) Eastern Region, Ghana
- Party: National Democratic Congress
- Education: Wesley Grammar
- Occupation: Politician
- Profession: Arms and Ammunition dealer

Emmanuel Ansah Nartey (born 4 May 1948) is a Ghanaian politician and Arms and Ammunition dealer. He served for Upper Manya Krobo constituency as member of the first parliament of the fourth republic of Ghana in the Eastern Region of Ghana.

== Early life and education ==
Emmanuel Ansah Nartey was born on May 4, 1948, in the Eastern Region of Ghana. He attended Wesley Grammar and obtained his General Certificate of Education (GCE) Ordinary Level.

== Politics ==
Emmanuel Ansah Nartey was elected during the 1992 Ghanaian parliamentary election on the ticket of the National Democratic Congress as member of the first parliament of the fourth republic of Ghana. He lost the seat in 1996 Ghanaian general election to Solomon Tettey Terkper of the National Democratic Congress who won with 15,390 votes which represented 43.30% of the share. He defeated Emmanuel Ansah Nartey an Independent who obtained 4,827 votes which represented 13.60% of the share, Charles Kwesi Narh of the National Convention Party(NCP) who obtained 3,173 votes which represented 8.90% of the share, Joe Sam of the New Patriotic Party(NPP) who obtained 2,644 votes which represented 7.40% of the share and Martin Adama Okai of the People's National Convention(PNC) who obtained 587 votes which represented 1.70% of the share.

== Career ==
Nartey is a former member of parliament for Upper Manya Krobo from 7 January 1993 to 7 January 1997, He is a dealer of Arms and ammunition.

== Personal life ==
He is a Christian.
