= Moses Asaga =

Ghanaian politician

Hon. Moses Asaga

Member of Parliament for Nabdam Constituency
- In office 7 January 2009 – 6 January 2013
- President: John Atta Mills; John Mahama

Member of Parliament for Nabdam Constituency
- In office 7 January 2005 – 6 January 2009
- President: John Kufuor

Personal details
- Born: 1 June 1957 (age 69)
- Party: National Democratic Congress
- Education: Durham University, University of Aberdeen, Yonsei University
- Profession: Economist/ Banker

Moses Aduku Asaga is a Ghanaian politician. He was the Member of Parliament for Nabdam in the Upper East Region of Ghana from 1997 to 2013. He lost the seat in the December 2012 elections to Boniface Agambilla of the New Patriotic Party (NPP) who has stood against him in the 2008 election but lost. He was also a Minister for Employment and Social Welfare in Ghana. He was appointed in early 2012 following a cabinet reshuffle by President Mills.

Moses Asaga had been nominated for a ministerial position in 2009 but was withdrawn following a controversy about some ex-gratia awards he had authorised. After John Dramani Mahama won the 2012 General Elections, he replaced Moses Asaga with Nii Armah Ashietey as Minister of Employment and Social Welfare. He was then given the position as the C.E.O of the National Petroleum Authority in 2013 by former president John Dramani Mahama

== Early life and education ==
Moses Asaga holds a BSc in Industrial Chemistry from Kwame Nkrumah University of Science and Technology. He also holds a MSc in Petroleum Engineering from Aberdeen University and MBA, Finance from Yonsei University. In addition to that he has MPhil in Financial Economics from Durham University, United Kingdom.

== Career ==
Asaga is an economist and a banker. He was the manager and project financier of the Ghana National Petroleum Corporation (GNPC) in Tema.

== Political career ==
Asaga is a member of the National Democratic Congress. He became a member of parliament from January 2005 after emerging winner in the General Election in December 2004. He is the MP for Nabdam constituency. He has been elected as the member of parliament for this constituency in fourth and fifth parliament of the fourth Republic of Ghana.

== Elections ==
Asaga was first elected into Parliament on the ticket of the National Democratic Congress with votes representing 8,490 votes out of the 11,348 valid votes cast representing 56.30% over Nicholas Nayembil Nonlant who polled 2,107 votes representing 14.00% and Edward Babah Sampanah who polled 750 votes representing 5.00%.

He was elected as the member of parliament for the Nabdam constituency of the Upper East Region of Ghana in the 2004 Ghanaian general elections. He won on the ticket of the National Democratic Congress. His constituency was a part of the 9 parliamentary seats out of 13 seats won by the National Democratic Congress in that election for the Upper East Region. The National Democratic Congress won a minority total of 94 parliamentary seats out of 230 seats. He was elected with 6,450 votes out of 10,778 total valid votes cast.

This was equivalent to 59.8% of total valid votes cast. He was elected over Somtim Tobiga of the Peoples’ National Convention, Boniface Gambila Adagbila of the New Patriotic Party and Tampure Ayenyeta William of the Convention People's Party. These obtained 1,002, 3,227 and 99 votes respectively of total votes cast. These were equivalent to 9.3%, 29.9% and 0.9% respectively of total valid votes cast.

In 2008, he won the general elections on the ticket of the National Democratic Congress for the same constituency. His constituency was part of the 8 parliamentary seats out of 13 seats won by the National Democratic Congress in that election for the Upper East Region. The National Democratic Congress won a minority total of 114 parliamentary seats out of 230 seats.

He was elected with 5,369 votes out of 11,230 total valid votes cast. This was equivalent to 47.81% of total valid votes cast. He was elected over Boniface Agambila Adagbila of the New Patriotic Party, Somtim Tobiga of the People's National Convention and Tampugre Ayenyeta William of the Convention People's Party. These obtained 45.39%, 6.37% and 0.44% respectively of the total votes cast.

== Personal life ==
Asaga is a Christian Catholic.

== See also ==
- List of Mills government ministers
- Nabdam constituency
- National Democratic Congress

Parliament of Ghana
Preceded by Danzi Paul Kpal	Nabdam; 1997 – Jan 2013	Succeeded by Boniface Agambilla
Political offices
Preceded by Enoch Teye Mensah	Minister for Employment and Social Welfare; 2012 – Jan 2013	Succeeded by Nii Amah Ashietey
