= Habib Saad =

Ghanaian politician (born 1968)

Member of the Ghana Parliament for Bortianor-Ngleshie-Amanfro Constituency

Personal details
- Born: 10 October 1968 (age 57) Antoakrom, Ghana
- Party: New Patriotic Party
- Education: Techno Global University

Habib Saad (born 10 October 1968) is a Ghanaian politician and member of the Seventh Parliament of the Fourth Republic of Ghana representing the Bortianor-Ngleshie-Amanfro Constituency in the Greater Accra Region on the ticket of the New Patriotic Party.

== Early life ==
Saad was born on 10 October 1968, in Antoakrom, in the Ashanti Region. He is a member of the Seventh Parliament of the Fourth Republic of Ghana.

== Education ==
He graduated with a Bachelor of Arts degree from India's Techno Global University. Since 2000, Saad has served as managing director of Go Enterprise.

== Politics ==
Habib Saad is a member of New Patriotic Party and was the member of parliament for Bortianor-Ngleshie-Amanfro constituency in the Greater Accra Region from January 2017 to January 2021.

=== 2016 election ===
Habib Saad contested the Bortianor-Ngleshie-Amanfro constituency parliamentary seat during the 2016 Ghanaian general election on New Patriotic Party ticket and won the election with 26,034 votes representing 53.09% of the total votes. He won the election over Bright Edward Kodzo Demordzi of National Democratic Congress, Adjetey Larbie of the Progressive People's Party, Evans Nii Djambum of the DPP and Peter Adzido of the Convention People's Party. They obtained 19, 405 votes, 2,529 votes, 867 votes and 200 votes respectively, equivalent to 39.57%, 5.16%, 1.77% and 0.41% of the total votes respectively.

Habib Saad lost the NPP 2020 primaries to Sylvester Tetteh.
