= Victor Okuley Nortey =

Ghanaian politician (1958–2024)

Member of Parliament for Ablekuma Central Constituency
- In office 26 March 1999 – 6 January 2009
- Preceded by: Theophilus Tetteh Chaie
- Succeeded by: Clement Samuel Crabbe

Personal details
- Born: 1958 Accra, Dominion of Ghana
- Died: 18 August 2024 (aged 65–66) Ghana
- Party: New Patriotic Party

Victor Okuley Nortey (1958 – 18 August 2024) was a Ghanaian politician and member of the Fourth Parliament of the Fourth Republic of Ghana representing the Ablekuma Central parliamentary constituency in the Greater Accra Region of Ghana. He was a member of New Patriotic Party.

== Early life and education ==
Nortey was born in 1958 in the Greater Accra Region of Ghana. He was a businessman.

== Political career ==
=== Elections ===
==== 1999 by-election ====
Nortey was first elected as member of the parliament for the Ablekuma Central Constituency of the Greater Accra Region of Ghana in the 1999 by-election which took place on 26 March 1999. He won with the majority vote of 4.808 votes with the ticket of the New Patriotic Party.

==== 2004 election ====
Nortey was elected as the member of parliament for the Ablekuma Central constituency of the Greater Accra Region of Ghana in the 2004 Ghanaian general elections. He won on the ticket of the New Patriotic Party. His constituency was a part of the 16 parliamentary seats out of 27 seats won by the New Patriotic Party in that election for the Greater Accra Region. The New Patriotic Party won a majority total of 128 parliamentary seats out of 230 seats. He was elected with 47,731 votes out of 94,969 total valid votes cast. This was equivalent to 50.3% of total valid votes cast. He was elected over Stephen Kwame Aloma of the People's National Convention, Basha Harsey of the National Democratic Congress, Stephen Douglas Annor of the Convention People's Party, Ali Ibrahim of the Democratic People's Party and Abdul Rahman Alim of the National Reformed Party. These obtained 1,465, 44,027, 1,273, 275 and 198 votes respectively of total valid votes cast. These were equivalent to 1.5%, 46.4%, 1.3%, 0.3% and 0.2% respectively of total valid votes cast.

== Personal life and death ==
Nortey was a Christian. He died on 18 August 2024.

== See also ==
- Ghanaian parliamentary election 2000
- Ghanaian parliamentary election 2004
- List of MPs elected in the 1996 Ghanaian parliamentary election
