= Ebenezer Gilbert Nii Narh Nartey =

Ghanaian politician (born 1979)

Member of the Ghana Parliament for Ablekuma Central Constituency
- In office January 2017 – January 2021
- Preceded by: Theophilus Tetteh Chaie

Personal details
- Born: 16 July 1979 (age 46) Ningo, Ghana
- Party: New Patriotic Party

Ebenezer Gilbert Nii Narh Nartey (born 16 July 1979) is a Ghanaian politician and member of the Seventh Parliament of the Fourth Republic of Ghana representing the Ablekuma Central Constituency in the Greater Accra Region on the ticket of the New Patriotic Party.

== Early life and education ==
He hails from Ningo in the Greater Accra Region.

He holds a Diploma in Human Resource Management from the Institute of Commercial Management. A Diploma in Architectural Draftsmanship from the Kwame Nkrumah University of Science and Technology and NVTI Certificate from the Modern School of Draftsmanship.

== Politics ==
He is a member of the New Patriotic Party. He is the member of parliament for Ablekuma Central Constituency in the Greater Accra Region.

=== 2016 election ===
Nartey contested the Alekuma central parliamentary seat on the ticket of New Patriotic Party during the 2016 Ghanaian general election and won the parliamentary seat with 46,884 votes, equivalent to 52.92%. He won the election over the National Democratic Congress parliamentary candidate Halidu Haruna who polled 40,686 votes representing 45.93%, Alfred Nartey Agbo of the PPP had 768 representing 0.86%, Josephine Ataa Oppong of the Convention people's party had 170 votes representing 0.19% and the parliamentary candidate for the NDP Christabel Kye who polled 84 votes, representing 0.09% of the total votes.

==== 2020 election ====
During the 2020 Ghanaian general election, Nartey contested again on the ticket of the New Patriotic Party for the Ablekum central parliamentary seat but lost the election with 46,836 votes out of the total votes (equivalent to 49.48%) to the National Democratic Congress parliamentary candidate Dan Abdul-Latif with 47,040 votes, representing 49.70 of the total votes.

== Employment ==
Nartey taught at Islamic Education Programme from 2004 to 2005. He was also the Executive Secretary for Hands that Care NGO. He was the Deputy Clients Service Manager from 2007 to 2011 at Lands Commission and the managing director of Ednark Limited from 2011 to 2016.

== Religion ==
He is a Christian.
