= List of high commissioners of Australia to Ghana =

High Commissioner of Australia to Ghana

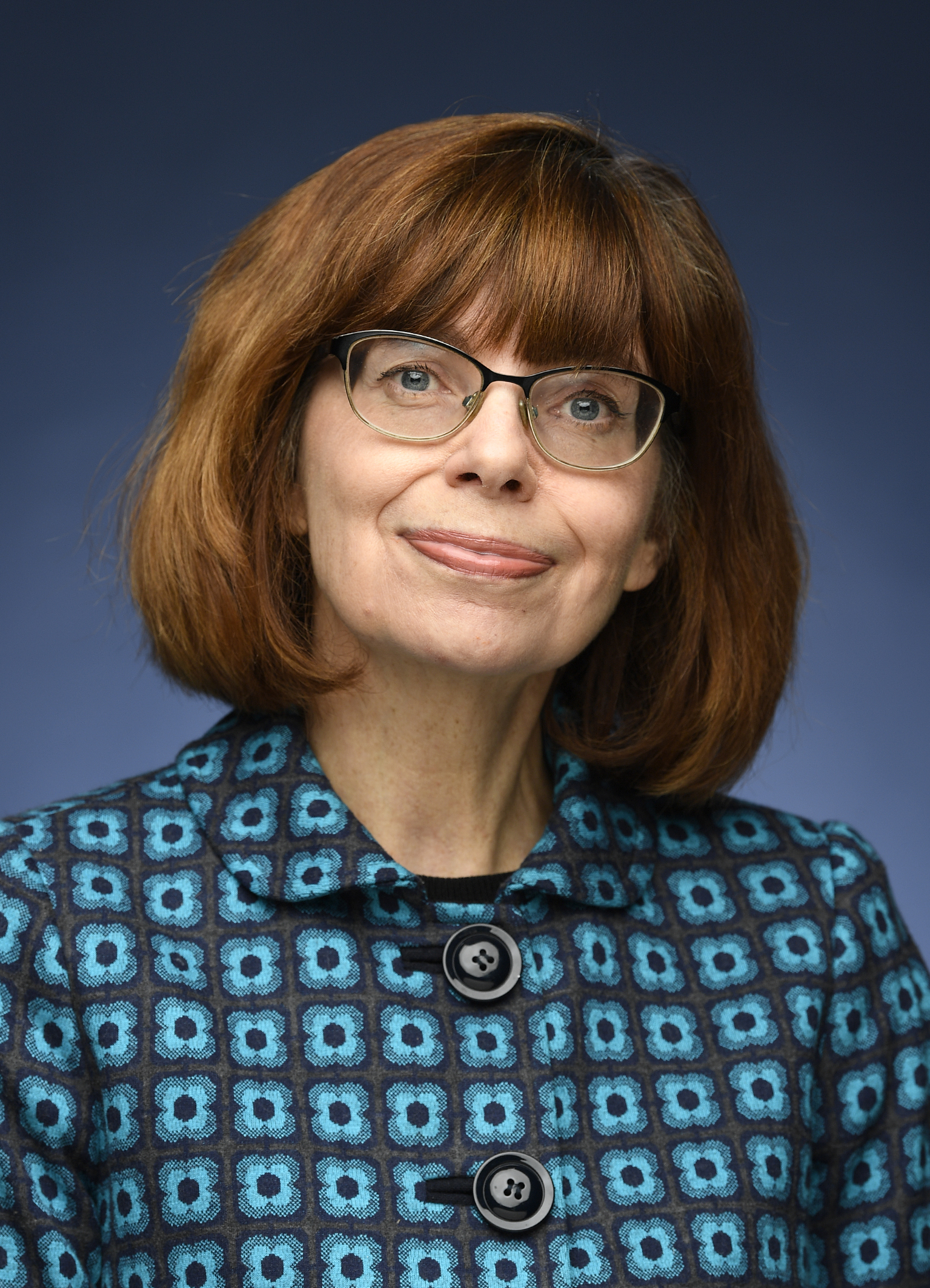
- Incumbent; Berenice Owen-Jones since 6 July 2022
- Department of Foreign Affairs and Trade
- Style: Her Excellency
- Reports to: Minister for Foreign Affairs
- Residence: Accra
- Nominator: Prime Minister of Australia
- Appointer: Governor General of Australia
- Inaugural holder: Stewart Wolfe Jamieson
- Formation: 21 February 1958
- Website: Australian High Commission, Ghana

The high commissioner of Australia to Ghana is an officer of the Australian Department of Foreign Affairs and Trade and the head of the High Commission of the Commonwealth of Australia in Accra, Ghana. The position has the rank and status of an ambassador extraordinary and plenipotentiary and is currently held by Berenice Owen-Jones since 6 July 2022. The ambassador also holds non-resident accreditation as high commissioner to Sierra Leone (1981–1985, since 2004), and Togo (since 2009), and as ambassador to Burkina Faso (since 2008), Côte d'Ivoire (1974–1985, since 2004), Mali (since 2004), Senegal (1974–1985, since 2004), Liberia (since 2008), and Guinea (since 2008). Non-resident accreditation as high commissioner to The Gambia was also held from 1982 to 1985, and from 2004 to 2008. Australia maintained a High Commission in Accra from 1957 to 1985, at which point accreditation was held by the high commissioner in Nigeria. The High Commission was re-established in 2004.

== Posting history ==
Australia was one of the first countries to recognise Ghana on its independence from 6 March 1957. The Australian Government sent Frederick Osborne, the Minister for Air, and Keith Brennan from the Department of External Affairs, as well as three RAAF Lockheed P-2 Neptune aircraft, to attend and participate in the independence celebrations from 2–10 March. On 27 August 1957, the Minister for External Affairs, Richard Casey, announced the establishment of an Australian High Commission in Accra. On 16 October 1957, Stewart Wolfe Jamieson was announced as the first high commissioner, who assumed duty on 21 February 1958 based in the Ambassador Hotel Accra.

On 19 August 1974, the Minister for Foreign Affairs, Don Willesee, announced the appointment of the high commissioner in Ghana, David Evans, as Australia's first ambassador to Senegal and Ivory Coast, marking the establishment of diplomatic relations with these countries. In October 1981, the high commissioner received non-resident accreditation as the first high commissioner to Sierra Leone. In February 1982, high commissioner Anthony Dingle, presented his commission as Australia's first high commissioner to The Gambia. However, in March 1985 the Foreign Minister, Bill Hayden, announced that due to budgetary pressures and as part of a rearrangement of Australian diplomatic representation in Africa, the high commission in Accra would be closed, with accreditation transferred to High Commission in Nigeria. On his decision, Hayden noted the following to the Australian Parliament's Joint Committee on Foreign Affairs and Defence: "The decision to close the High Commission in Accra was not easy. Australia values its good relationship with Ghana and has no wish to give the impression that it is not concerned with or interested in the issues of the area. I have assured the Ghanaian Government that Australia looks forward to maintaining close relations through the accreditation of a non-resident high commissioner."

On 30 June 2004, Foreign Minister Alexander Downer announced the official reopening of the Australian High Commission in Accra, with non-resident accreditation for Cote d'Ivoire, The Gambia, Senegal and Sierra Leone being transferred from the High Commission in Nigeria. In September 2008 the governments of Australia and Liberia agreed to establish diplomatic relations at the ambassador level, with high commissioner Billy Williams becoming Australia's first Ambassador to Liberia from February 2009.

== Heads of mission ==
#	Officeholder	Other offices	Residency	Term start date	Term end date	Time in office	Notes
1	Stewart Wolfe Jamieson	n/a	Accra	21 February 1958	19 February 1960	1 year, 363 days	
−	Murray Bourchier (Acting)	n/a	Accra	19 February 1960	5 May 1960	2 months	
2	Bertram Ballard	n/a	Accra	9 May 1960	17 April 1962	1 year, 343 days	
−	Nick Evers (Acting)	n/a	Accra	17 April 1962	3 March 1963	320 days	
−	Barrie Dexter (Acting)	n/a	Accra	3 March 1963	July 1965	2 years, 3 months	
3	John Ryan	n/a	Accra	July 1965	October 1967	2 years, 3 months	
4	Richard Woolcott	n/a	Accra	31 October 1967	3 October 1970	2 years, 337 days	
5	John McMillan	n/a	Accra	3 October 1970	June 1973	2 years, 7 months	
6	R. J. Percival	n/a	Accra	June 1973	June 1974	1 year	
7	David Evans	^{A}^{B}	Accra	June 1974	August 1977	3 years, 2 months	
8	John McCredie	^{A}^{B}	Accra	August 1977	July 1980	2 years, 11 months	
9	Anthony Dingle	^{A}^{B}^{C}^{D}	Accra	July 1980	July 1983	3 years	
10	Geoffrey Allen	^{A}^{B}^{C}^{D}	Accra	July 1983	20 March 1985	1 year, 8 months	
11	Allan Taylor	n/a	Abuja, Nigeria	20 March 1985	June 1986	1 year, 2 months	
12	Hugh Wyndham	n/a	Abuja, Nigeria	11 June 1986	June 1989	2 years, 11 months	
13	Oliver Cordell	n/a	Abuja, Nigeria	20 June 1989	April 1993	3 years, 9 months	
14	Howard Brown	n/a	Abuja, Nigeria	April 1993	September 1997	4 years, 5 months	
15	Matthew Neuhaus	n/a	Abuja, Nigeria	October 1997	January 2001	3 years, 3 months	
16	Bob Whitty	n/a	Abuja, Nigeria	January 2001	February 2004	3 years, 1 month	
17	Iain Dicke	n/a	Abuja, Nigeria	February 2004	30 June 2004	4 months	
18	Jon Richardson	^{A}^{B}^{C}^{D}^{E}^{F}	Accra	30 June 2004	February 2008	3 years, 7 months	
19	Billy Williams	^{A}^{B}^{C}^{E}^{F}^{G}^{H}^{I}	Accra	February 2008	December 2012	4 years, 10 months	
20	Joanna Adamson	^{A}^{B}^{C}^{E}^{F}^{G}^{H}^{I}	Accra	January 2013	June 2016	3 years, 5 months	
21	Andrew Barnes	^{A}^{B}^{C}^{E}^{F}^{G}^{H}^{I}	Accra	June 2016	June 2020	4 years	
22	Gregory Andrews	^{A}^{B}^{C}^{E}^{F}^{G}^{H}^{I}	Accra	July 2020	20 December 2021	1 year, 5 months	
23	Berenice Owen-Jones	^{A}^{B}^{C}^{E}^{F}^{G}^{H}^{I}	Accra	6 July 2022	Incumbent	4 years, 111 days	

=== Notes ===
^A: Also non-resident Ambassador to Côte d'Ivoire, 1974–1985 and 2004–present.
^B: Also non-resident Ambassador to Senegal, 1974–1985 and 2004–present.
^C: Also non-resident High Commissioner to Sierra Leone, 1981–1985 and 2004–present.
^D: Also non-resident High Commissioner to The Gambia, 1982–1985, 2004–2008.
^E: Also non-resident Ambassador to Mali, 2004–present.
^F: Also non-resident Ambassador (2009–2022) and High Commissioner (2022–present) to Togo.
^G: Also non-resident Ambassador to Burkina Faso, 2008–present.
^H: Also non-resident Ambassador to Liberia, 2008–present.
^I: Also non-resident Ambassador to Guinea, 2008–present.
