= Mark Kurt Nawaane =

Ghanaian politician

Hon Mark Kurt Nawaane
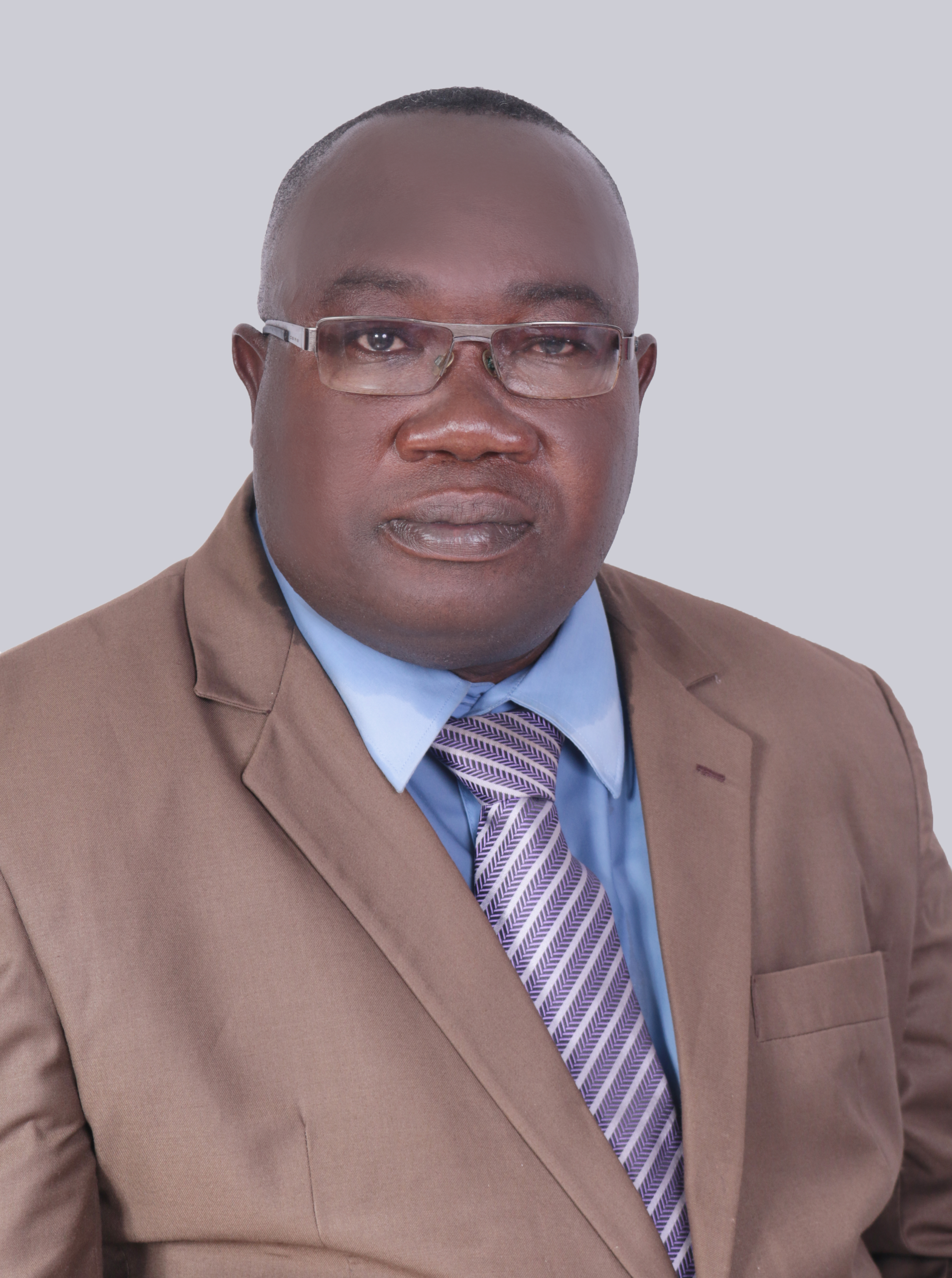

Member of the Ghana Parliament for Nabdam
- Incumbent
- Assumed office 7 January 2021

Personal details
- Born: Mark Kurt Nawaane; 21 April 1966 (age 60) Tizza-Nimbare
- Party: National Democratic Congress
- Occupation: Politician
- Cabinet: Health Committee Member, Subsidiary Legislation Committee

Mark Kurt Nawaane (21 April 1966) is a Ghanaian politician and member of the Seventh Parliament of the Fourth Republic of Ghana representing the Nabdam Constituency in the Upper East Region on the ticket of the National Democratic Congress.

== Early life and education ==
Nawaane hails from Kongo-Nangodi. He holds an M.B.A from Paris Graduate School of Management and an M.D. from the Institute of Medicine and Hygiene, St.Petersburg, Russia.

== Personal life ==
Mark Kurt Nawaane is a christian.
