= List of high commissioners of Australia to Nigeria =

High Commissioner of Australia to Nigeria

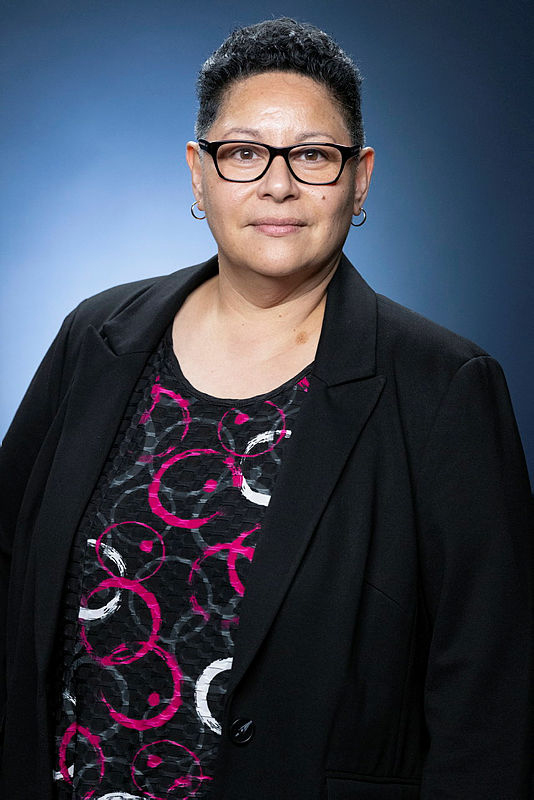
- Incumbent; Leilani Bin-Juda since 12 November 2023
- Department of Foreign Affairs and Trade
- Style: His Excellency
- Reports to: Minister for Foreign Affairs
- Residence: Abuja
- Nominator: Prime Minister of Australia
- Appointer: Governor General of Australia
- Inaugural holder: Lionel Phillips (Acting)
- Formation: 10 September 1960
- Website: Australian High Commission, Nigeria

The high commissioner of Australia to Nigeria is an officer of the Australian Department of Foreign Affairs and Trade and the head of the High Commission of the Commonwealth of Australia in Abuja, Nigeria. The position has the rank and status of an ambassador extraordinary and plenipotentiary and is currently vacant, with the head of mission being Jonathan Ball as acting high commissioner and Chargé d’Affaires since July 2022. The ambassador also holds non-resident accreditation as high commissioner to The Gambia (1985–2004, since 2008), and Gabon (1988–1989; since 2010), and as ambassador to Benin (since 2010), Cameroon (since 2002), and Niger (since 2009), and as representative to the Economic Community of West African States (ECOWAS). Non-resident accreditation was also previously held for Ghana, Côte d'Ivoire, Senegal, and Sierra Leone from 1985 to 2004, Chad (2007–2010), and the Republic of the Congo (2009–2015). The high commissioner also has responsibility for the honorary consulates of Australia in Lagos (since 2012) and Yaoundé (since 2014).

== Posting history ==
Immediately prior to the independence of Nigeria on 1 October 1960, Australia established a diplomatic mission in Lagos on 10 September 1960, with Lionel Phillips as acting commissioner, and then acting high commissioner from 1 October. On 8 November 1960, Robert Furlonger was appointed as the first Australian high commissioner to the Federation of Nigeria, who took up his appointment from 1 February 1961.

== High commissioners ==
#	Officeholder	Other offices	Term start date	Term end date	Time in office	Notes
−	Lionel Phillips (Acting)	n/a	10 September 1960	1 February 1961	144 days	
1	Robert Furlonger	n/a	1 February 1961	23 April 1961	81 days	
−	Thomas Venables Holland (Acting)	n/a	25 April 1961	5 October 1961	163 days	
2	Alan Renouf	n/a	5 October 1961	17 March 1963	1 year, 163 days	
−	Lionel Phillips (Acting)	n/a	22 March 1963	August 1965	2 years, 4 months	
3	James Cumes	n/a	August 1965	December 1967	2 years, 4 months	
4	H. D. White	n/a	December 1967	June 1970	2 years, 6 months	
5	Pierre Hutton	n/a	June 1970	June 1973	3 years	
6	W. H. Bray	n/a	June 1973	June 1976	3 years	
7	W. Kevin Flanagan	n/a	June 1976	November 1979	3 years, 5 months	
8	Charles Mott	n/a	November 1979	March 1983	3 years, 4 months	
9	Allan Taylor	^{A}^{B}^{C}^{D}^{E}	March 1983	June 1986	3 years, 3 months	
10	Hugh Wyndham	^{A}^{B}^{C}^{D}^{E}^{F}	11 June 1986	June 1989	2 years, 11 months	
11	Oliver Cordell	^{A}^{B}^{C}^{D}^{E}	20 June 1989	April 1993	3 years, 9 months	
12	Howard Brown	^{A}^{B}^{C}^{D}^{E}	April 1993	September 1997	4 years, 5 months	
13	Matthew Neuhaus	^{A}^{B}^{C}^{D}^{E}	October 1997	January 2001	3 years, 3 months	
14	Bob Whitty	^{A}^{B}^{C}^{D}^{E}^{G}	January 2001	February 2004	3 years, 1 month	
15	Iain Dicke	^{A}^{B}^{C}^{D}^{E}^{G}	February 2004	February 2007	3 years	
16	Jeffrey Hart	^{E}^{G}^{H}^{I}^{J}	February 2007	February 2010	3 years	
17	Ian McConville	^{E}^{F}^{G}^{I}^{J}^{K}	July 2010	December 2012	2 years, 5 months	
18	Jon Richardson	^{E}^{F}^{G}^{I}^{J}^{K}	January 2013	December 2015	2 years, 11 months	
19	Paul Lehmann	^{E}^{F}^{G}^{I}^{K}	December 2015	June 2019	3 years, 6 months	
20	Claire Ireland	^{E}^{F}^{G}^{I}^{K}	June 2019	January 2021	1 year, 7 months	
21	John Donnelly	^{E}^{F}^{G}^{I}^{K}	January 2021	July 2022	1 year, 6 months	
−	Jonathan Ball (acting)	^{E}^{F}^{G}^{I}^{K}	July 2022	Incumbent	4 years, 2 months	

=== Notes ===
^A Also non-resident high commissioner to Ghana, 1985–2004.
^B Also non-resident ambassador to Côte d'Ivoire, 1985–2004.
^C Also non-resident ambassador to Senegal, 1985–2004.
^D Also non-resident high commissioner to Sierra Leone, 1985–2004.
^E Also non-resident high commissioner to The Gambia, 1985–2004, 2008–present.
^F Also non-resident ambassador (1988–1989, 2010–2022) and high commissioner (2022–present) to Gabon.
^G Also non-resident ambassador to Cameroon, 2002–present.
^H Also non-resident ambassador to Chad, 2007–2010.
^I Also non-resident ambassador to Niger, 2009–present.
^J Also non-resident ambassador to the Republic of the Congo, 2009–2015.
^K Also non-resident ambassador to Benin, 2010–present.
