= Joanna Lindgren =

Australian politician (born 1969)

Senator for Queensland
- In office 21 May 2015 – 2 July 2016
- Preceded by: Brett Mason
- Succeeded by: Malcolm Roberts

Personal details
- Born: 5 November 1969 (age 57) Brisbane, Australia
- Party: Liberal National (to 2018); Conservatives (2018–2019)
- Other political affiliations: Liberal (federal)
- Spouse: Peter Anderson-Barr
- Education: Griffith University
- Profession: Schoolteacher

Joanna Maria Lindgren (born 5 November 1969) is an Australian politician who served as a Senator for Queensland from May 2015 to July 2016.

Lindgren was appointed to the Senate on the nomination of the Liberal National Party of Queensland to fill the casual vacancy caused by Brett Mason's resignation. She sat with the Liberal Party in federal parliament until her defeat at the 2016 federal election. She was the second Indigenous Australian woman to serve in the Senate, after Nova Peris. Lindgren joined the Australian Conservatives in 2018 and was an unsuccessful candidate for the Senate at the 2019 federal election.

== Early life ==
Born in Brisbane, Lindgren attended Brigidine College in Indooroopilly and St Peter Claver College in Riverview, and subsequently went on to Griffith University, receiving a graduate diploma in education after her initial arts degree. Before entering politics, she worked as a high-school teacher in Brisbane, and was also a member of the Australian Army Reserve.

Lindgren is an Aboriginal Australian with Jagera and Mununjali ancestry. Her granduncle, Neville Bonner, was also a senator for Queensland, and was the first Indigenous Australian in the Australian Parliament.

== Politics ==
At the 2012 state election, Lindgren contested the seat of Inala, a safe Labor seat held by Annastacia Palaszczuk (a future premier). She failed to win the seat, but did record a two-party preferred (2PP) swing of 14.63 points towards the LNP, finishing with 43.10% of the final 2PP vote.

Following the resignation of LNP senator Brett Mason in April 2015, Lindgren was one of nine candidates to contest the casual vacancy, with her chief opponent being Bill Glasson, a former president of the Australian Medical Association. She won the vote, and at the same time, was also preselected for the third position on the LNP senate ticket at the 2016 federal election. A sitting of the Queensland Parliament formally appointed Lindgren to fill the vacancy on 21 May 2015. She chose to join the federal Liberal partyroom (rather than the Nationals), as LNP members may choose between the two. The Sydney Morning Herald reported that Lindgren was a "surprise candidate" who "opposes gay marriage, abortion and euthanasia" after the LNP opposed Glasson's support for homosexual activism. She was defeated at the 2016 federal election.

Lindgren joined Cory Bernardi's Australian Conservatives in 2018 and ran on the party's Queensland Senate ticket at the 2019 federal election.

== Personal life ==
Lindgren's husband Peter Anderson-Barr is a policeman, and was briefly an LNP candidate for the seat of Logan at the 2012 state election, but withdrew before the close of nominations.

== See also ==
- List of Indigenous Australian politicians
- Members of the Australian Senate, 2014–2016
