= Ablekuma Central =

Ghana parliament constituency

Coordinates: 5°35′35.5171″N 0°14′45.5590″W

- constituency for the Parliament of Ghana
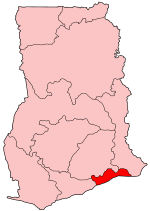
- District: Accra Metropolis District
- Region: Greater Accra Region of Ghana

Current constituency
- Party: National Democratic Congress
- MP: Dan Abdul-latif

Ablekuma Central is one of the constituencies represented in the Parliament of Ghana. It elects one Member of Parliament (MP) by the first past the post system of election. Ablekuma Central is located in the Accra Metropolitan Area of the Greater Accra Region of Ghana.

== Boundaries ==
The seat is located entirely within the Accra Metropolitan Area of the Greater Accra Region of Ghana.

== Members of Parliament ==
First elected	Member	Party
1992	Isma'el Bawa	National Democratic Congress
1996	Clement Samuel Crabbe	New Patriotic Party
1999	Victor Okuley Nortey	New Patriotic Party
2008	Theophilus Tettey Chaie	National Democratic Congress
2016	Ebenezer Gilbert Nii Narh Nartey	New Patriotic Party
2020	Dan Abdul-latif	National Democratic Congress

== Elections ==
2024 Ghanaian general election: Ablekuma Central
Party	Candidate	Votes	%	±%
NDC	Dan Abdul-latif	45,066	57.92	
NPP	Jefferson Kwamina Sackey	32,735	42.08	
Majority		12,331	15.86	
Turnout		78,224	59.33	—
Registered electors		130,852		

2020 Ghanaian general election: Ablekuma Central
Party	Candidate	Votes	%	±%
NDC	Dan Abdul-latif	47,040	49.70	—
NPP	Ebenezer Gilbert Nii Narh Nartey	46,836	49.48	—
Independent	Apea-Danquah Samuel	442	0.47	—
NDP	Christabel A. Kye	333	0.35	—
Ghana Union Movement	Adonu Kwabena Benjamin	0	0.00	—
Majority		2,104	0.22	—
Turnout		—	—	—
Registered electors		—		—

2016 Ghanaian general election: Ablekuma Central
Party	Candidate	Votes	%	±%
NPP	Ebenezer Gilbert Nii Narh Nartey	46,884	52.92	—
NDC	Halidu Haruna	40,686	45.93	—
PPP	Alfred Nartey Agbo	763	0.86	—
CPP	Josephine Ataa Oppong	170	0.19	—
NDP	Christabel Kye	84	0.09	—
Majority				—
Turnout		—	—	—
Registered electors		—		—

2012 Ghanaian general election: Ablekuma Central
Party	Candidate	Votes	%	±%
NDC	Theophilus Tettey Chaie	46,666	49.51	−1.49
NPP	Ebenezer Gilbert Nii Narh Nartey	45,265	48.03	+1.83
PPP	Ishmael Kabore Ahmed	1,009	1.07	—
People's National Convention	Ahmed Rufai Abubakar	698	0.74	−0.66
CPP	Josephine Ataa Oppong	229	0.24	−0.96
NDP	Oumorou Sanda Mouhamed Bingle	228	0.24	—
Independent	Godlove Charles Kwatelai Quartey	110	0.12	—
DPP	Ibrahim Awudu	46	0.05	−0.15
Majority		1,401	1.48	—
Turnout		—	—	—
Registered electors		—		—

2008 Ghanaian parliamentary election: Ablekuma Central
Party	Candidate	Votes	%	±%
NDC	Theophilus Tettey Chaie	43,253	51.01	+4.6
NPP	Robert Sarbah	39,179	46.21	−1.0
People's National Convention	Saeed Abdallah Abdumumin	1,213	+1.43	−0.1
CPP	Winfred Anani Akpabey	999	1.18	−0.1
DPP	Rebecca Ardey	144	0.17	—
Majority		4,074	4.8	−0.1
Turnout				—
Registered electors		—		—

2004 Ghanaian parliamentary election: Ablekuma Central
Party	Candidate	Votes	%	±%
NPP	Victor Okuley Nortey	47,731	50.3	−1.0
NDC	Basha Harsey	44,027	46.4	+7.5
People's National Convention	Stephen Kwame Aloma	1465	1.5	0.0
CPP	Stephen Douglas Annor	1,273	1.3	+0.3
DPP	Ali Ibrahim	275	0.3	—
National Reform Party	Abdul Rahman Alim	198	0.2	—
Majority		3,704	3.9	—
Turnout		95,072	84.7	—
Registered electors		—		—

2000 Ghanaian parliamentary election: Ablekuma Central Source:Adam Carr's Election Archives
Party	Candidate	Votes	%	±%
New Patriotic Party	Victor Okuley Nortey	33,997	51.3	−6.5
National Democratic Congress	A. C. J. Vanderpuye	25,822	38.9	−0.8
National Reform Party	Aramansah Naa N. B. Forjoe	2,906	4.4	—
Independent	Stephen Kwame Aloma	1,107	1.7	—
People's National Convention	Anna Abugzio	1,029	1.5	0.0
Convention People's Party	Stephen A. Douglas Annor	653	1.0	0.0
United Ghana Movement	Edward N. Nettey-Marbell	414	0.6	—
Great Consolidated Popular Party	S. A. Annorbah	377	0.6	—
Majority		8,175	12.4	—

Ablekuma Central by-election, 1999^{[a]} Source:Electoral Commission of Ghana
Party	Candidate	Votes	%	±%
New Patriotic Party	Victor Okuley Nortey	15,303	57.8	25.5
National Democratic Congress	Ishmael Bawa	10,495	39.7	8.7
People's National Convention	Solomon B. Baloro	398	1.5	−5.5
Convention People's Party	Fati Suraja	254	1.0	0.9
Majority		4,808	11.8	10.5
Turnout				—

1996 Ghanaian parliamentary election: Ablekuma Central Source:MyJoyOnline
Party	Candidate	Votes	%	±%
New Patriotic Party	Clement Samuel Crabbe	30,158	32.3	—
National Democratic Congress	Ismail Bawa	28,952	31.0	—
Independent	Cornelius Adablah	7,092	7.6	—
People's National Convention	Ahmed Ramadan	6,569	7.0	—
Convention People's Party	Ellis Quaye	1,773	1.9	—
New Patriotic Party	Victor Okuley Nortey	0	0.0	—
Majority		1,206	1.3	—
Turnout				—

1992 Ghanaian parliamentary election: Ablekuma Central Source:
Party	Candidate	Votes	%	±%
National Democratic Congress	Dr. Victor Agadzi	—	—	—

== See also ==
- List of Ghana Parliament constituencies
