= Sam Nartey George =

Ghanaian politician (born 1985)

The Honourable Samuel Nartey George
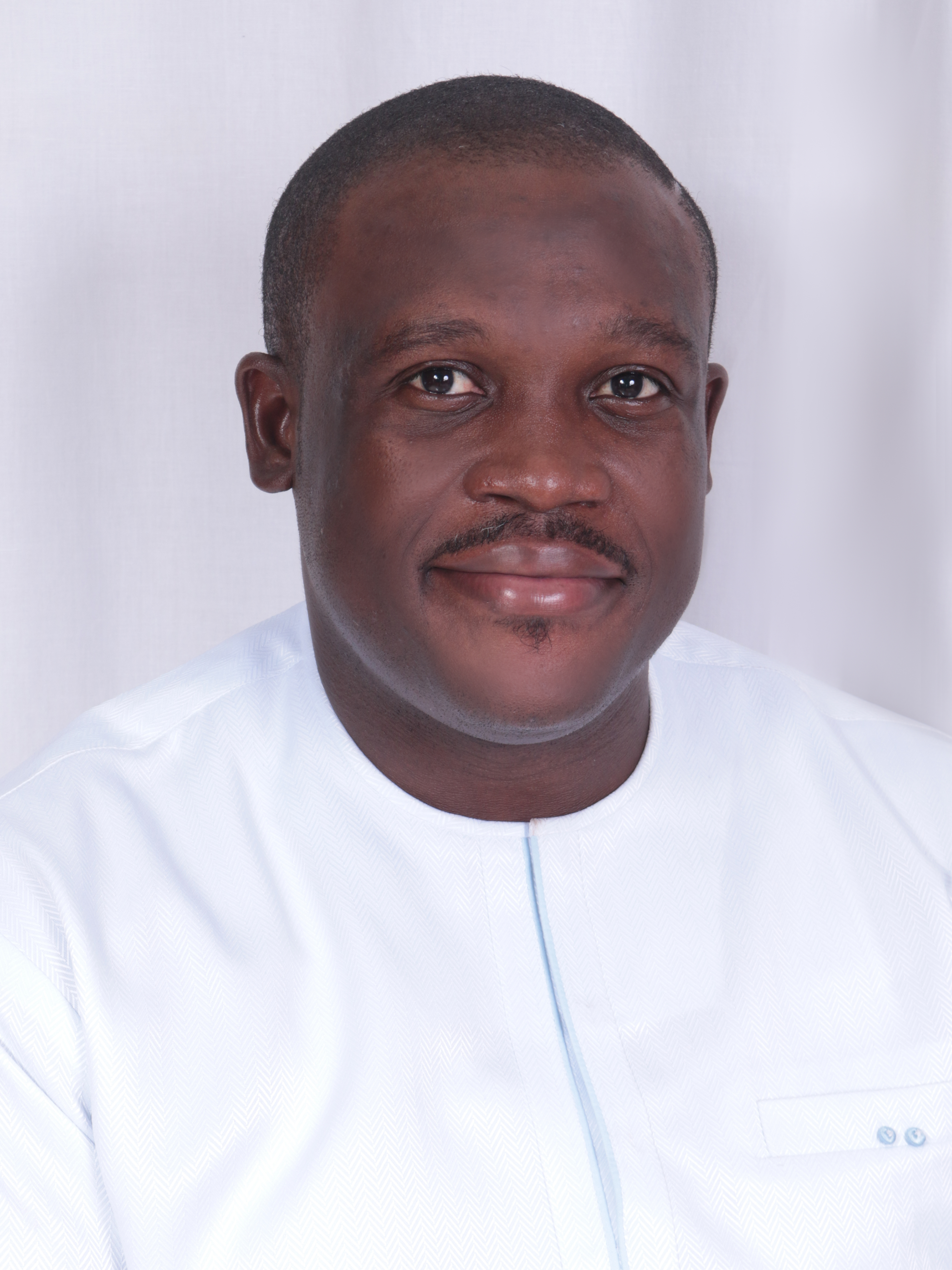
- George in 2021

Member of Parliament for Ningo-Prampram
- Incumbent
- Assumed office January 2017
- President: Nana Akufo-Addo
- Preceded by: Enoch Teye Mensah

Minister of Communications, Digital Technology and Innovations
- Incumbent
- Assumed office January 2017
- President: John Dramani Mahama
- Preceded by: Ursula Owusu
- Incumbent
- Assumed office February 2025

Personal details
- Born: Sam Nartey George; 22 January 1985 (age 41) Somanya
- Party: National Democratic Congress
- Children: 3
- Education: Kwame Nkrumah University of Science and Technology; University of London
- Occupation: politician
- Committees: Public Accounts Committee; Communications Committee

Samuel Nartey George (born 22 January 1985) is a Ghanaian politician and a lawyer. He is a member of the National Democratic Congress (NDC). He defeated E. T. Mensah to represent the party in the 2016 parliamentary elections for the Ningo-Prampram Constituency. He again won the 2020 Ghanaian general election and the 2024 Ghanaian general election and is currently a member of the ninth Parliament of the Fourth Republic of Ghana, representing the Ningo-Prampram constituency. He is from Ahwiam, Old Ningo. He is known for his dedication to national affairs and outspoken nature especially his strong stance against the LGBTQ+ community.

== Early life and education ==
Sam Nartey George was born on 22 January 1985 in Somanya in the Eastern Region of Ghana. He obtained a BSc. in Agricultural Engineering (Soil & Water Engineering) from KNUST and an L.L.B from the University of London (External). He has an Executive Master (Dissertation) in Conflict, Peace, and Security) from the Kofi Annan International Peacekeeping and Training Center (KAIPTC). In December 2022, he graduated with an MSc in International Strategy and Diplomacy from the London School of Economics and Political Science.

== Career ==
Sam Nartey George was an assistant director at the Office of the Head of Civil Service from 2010 to 2014 and a communications specialist at the office of the President from 2014 to 2016. Sam George has been appointed the minister for Communication in the Ministry of Communication, Digital Technology and Innovation.

=== Electoral history ===
==== Elections ====
On 21 November 2015, Sam George defeated the incumbent Member of Parliament for Ningo-Prampram Hon. Enoch Teye Mensah (MP from 1996 to 2015) in the NDC primaries for a chance to represent the party in the 2016 parliamentary elections. He won with 4,910 votes, representing 53.4% of total votes, while E. T. Mensah polled 2,831, representing 38.5%.

In the 2020 election, George was declared the winner of the Ningo-Prampram Constituency parliamentary Elections by polling 23,860 votes representing 63% to defeat his closest contender, Sylvester Tetteh of the NPP, who polled 13,588 votes.

On 13 May 2023, Sam George was retained as National Democratic Congress parliamentary representative for the Member of Parliament for Ningo-Prampram Constituency by beating Michael Kwettey Nettey in the NDC 2023 primaries for a chance to represent the party in the 2024 parliamentary elections. He won with 1,036 votes.

During the 2024 elections, he won again to mark his 3rd term as MP for the Constituency over his opponent Michael Tetteh Eku.

==== Parliamentary committees ====
Sam George is a member of the Public Accounts Committee and the Communications Committee.

=== Anti-LGBTI legislation ===
Alongside seven other Members of Parliament, he submitted a private bill to push for the criminalization of LGBTI activities in the country. He led the eight-member committee and made a presentation to the house terming it as a "landmark legislation". Despite the economic sanctions by other countries, Sam defended the bill, stating that any economic consequence the country may face would be negligible. In 2021, George threatened to assault Australian High Commissioner Gregory Andrews for his support of the LGBTQI community. In 2023, he criticized U.S. Vice President Kamala Harris for supporting the human rights of LGBTQ people.

Kenyan journalist Larry Madowo interviewed Sam George on CNN on October 9 about his proposal for the bill.

== Personal life ==
Sam George is a Christian and married. He is a member of the Perez Chapel International.

== Awards and Professional Recognition ==
Samuel Nartey George, Ghana’s Minister for Communications, Digital Technology & Innovation, was awarded Public Sector Digital Leader of the Year at the 2025 Digital Innovation Awards in recognition of his leadership in expanding digital skills initiatives and improving affordable data access in Ghana.
