= Bismark Tetteh Nyarko =

Ghanaian politician

Hon Bismark Tetteh Nyarko
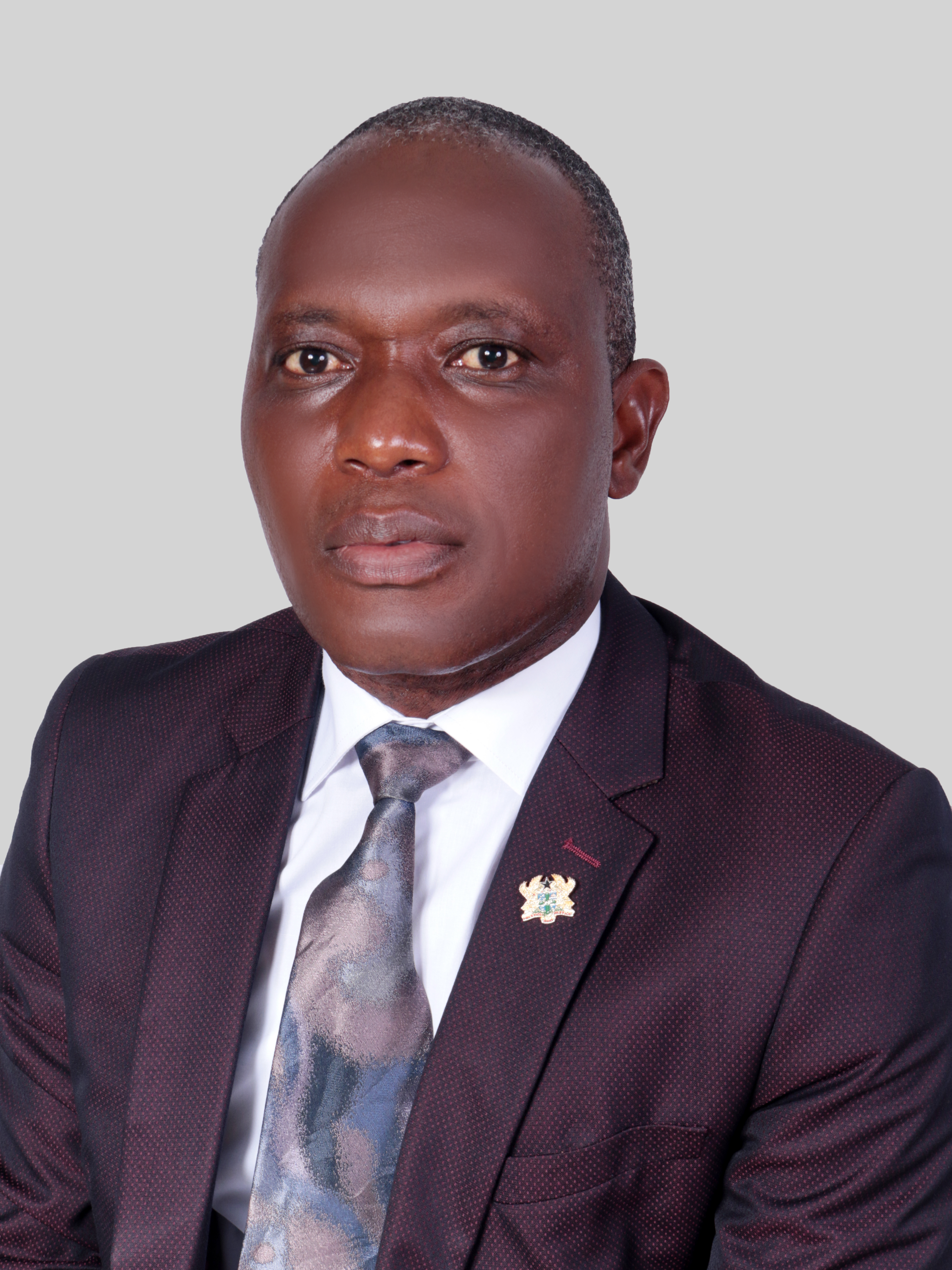

Member of the Ghana Parliament for Upper Manya
- Incumbent
- Assumed office 7 January 2021

Personal details
- Born: Bismark Tetteh Nyarko; 15 December 1973 (age 52) Manya Krobo
- Party: National Democratic Congress
- Occupation: Politician
- Committees: Subsidiary Legislation Committee, Constitutional, Legal and Parliamentary Affairs Committee

Bismark Tetteh Nyarko (born 15 December 1973) is a Ghanaian politician who currently serves as the Member of Parliament for the Upper Manya Krobo Constituency.
