= Dan Abdul-latif =

Ghanaian politician

Hon. Dan Abdul-latif MP
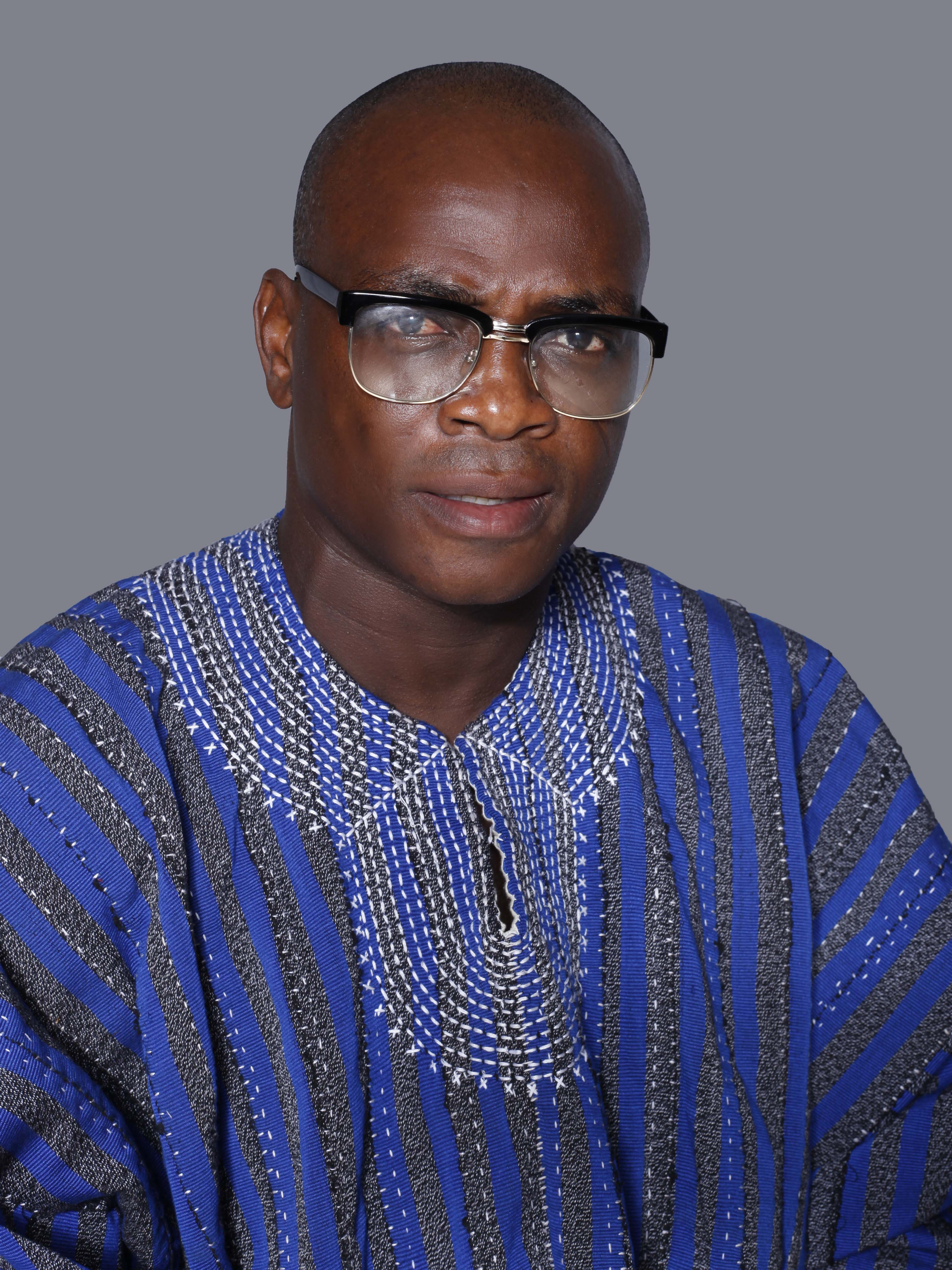

Member of the Ghana Parliament for Ablekuma Central Constituency
- Preceded by: Ebenezer Gilbert Nii Narh Nartey

Personal details
- Born: January 1, 1970 (age 56)
- Party: National Democratic Congress(NDC)
- Education: St. Joseph Middle School, Tamal
- Profession: Politician

Dan Abdul-latif (born 1 January 1970) is a Ghanaian politician. He is a member of the Eighth Parliament of the Fourth Republic of Ghana representing the Ablekuma Central Constituency in the Ablekuma Central Municipal District in the Greater Accra Region of Ghana.

== Early life and career ==
Abdul-latif was born on 1 January 1970. He hails from Tamale in the Northern region of Ghana. He holds Degree in Communication Management (2020). He was the Chief Executive office of Ysan Cevre Isiklan Dirma Malzemeleri S. T. Ltd.

== Politics ==
Abdul-latif is a member of the National Democratic Congress(NDC). In August 2021, he contest and won the NDC Parliamentary Primaries at Ablekuma Central Constituency to become the party's candidate for the December 2020 election. He won the December 2020 parliamentary election with 47,040 votes representing 49.7% of the total votes cast, beating his main opponent and incumbent member of parliament Ebenezer Gilbert Nii Narh Nartey of the New patriotic Party who obtained 46,836 votes representing 49.5% of the total valid votes cast. He was re-elected member of parliament for the same constituency during the 2024 elections.

=== Committees ===
He serves as a member of Communication Committee and House Committee respectively in the Eighth Parliament of the Fourth Republic of Ghana.

== Personal life ==
He is a Muslim.
