= Solomon Tettey Terkper =

Ghanaian politician

Member of parliament for Upper Manya Krobo Constituency
- In office 7 January 1997 – 6 January 2001
- President: John Jerry Rawlings

Personal details
- Born: Upper Manya Krobo, Eastern Region Ghana)
- Party: National Democratic Congress
- Occupation: Politician

Solomon Tettey Terkper is a Ghanaian politician and a member of the Second Parliament of the Fourth republic representing the

Upper Manyo Krobo constituency in the Eastern Region of Ghana.

== Early life ==
Terkper was born in Upper Manyo Krobo in the Eastern Region of Ghana.

== Politics ==
He was first elected into Parliament on the Ticket of the National Democratic Congress for the Upper Manyo Krobo in the Eastern Region of Ghana in the December 1996 Ghanaian general election. He polled 15,390 votes out of the 26,621 valid votes representing 43.30% over his opponents Emmanuel Ansah Nartey who polled 4,827 votes representing 13.60%, Charles Kwesi Narh who polled 3,173 votes representing 8.90%, Joe Sam who polled 2,644 votes representing 7.40% and Martin Adama Okai who polled 587 votes representing 1.70%. He joined the Convention People's Party in 2000 and lost to Stephen Kwao Amoanor of the National Democratic Congress.
