= Stephen Amoanor Kwao =

Ghanaian politician

Hon. Stephen Amoanor Kwao

Member of the Ghana Parliament for Upper Manya
- In office Jan 2001 – 2013
- Preceded by: Solomon Tettey Terkper
- Majority: 7,759

Minister for Employment and Social Welfare
- In office 2009–2010
- President: John Atta Mills
- Succeeded by: Enoch Teye Mensah

Minister at the Presidency
- Incumbent
- Assumed office 2010
- President: John Atta Mills

Personal details
- Born: 12 September 1951 (age 75) Akrusu Saisi, Ghana
- Party: National Democratic Congress
- Children: 4
- Profession: Educationist

Stephen Amoanor Kwao (born 12 September 1951) is a Ghanaian educationist and politician. He a former Member of Parliament for the Upper Manya constituency and a Minister of State at the Office of the President of Ghana. He is also a former deputy director of the Ghana Education service as well as a former national secretary of the National Democratic Congress. He is also a former minister for Employment and Social Welfare.

== Early life and education ==
Stephen Kwao was born on 12 September 1951 at Akrusu Saisi, a town in the Manya Krobo District of the Eastern Region of Ghana. His primary education was at the Akrusu Saisi Roman Catholic Primary School and the Asesewa Roman Catholic Middle School. His secondary education was at the Saint Martin's Secondary School at Adoagyiri-Nsawam where he obtained the General Certificate of Education Ordinary Level in 1971. His basic teacher training was at the Mount Mary Training College at Somanya-Krobo in the Eastern Region. He then attended what is now the University of Education, Winneba between 1992 and 1996, obtaining a diploma in education. He completed a Bachelor of Education degree in 1999 at the same institution.

== Educational work ==
Stephen Kwao was assistant headmaster at various Asesewaa Roman Catholic school between 1977 and 1985. He became the headmaster of the Asesewa Roman Catholic Complex Junior Secondary School between 1987 and 1992. After completing his diploma in education, he taught at the Krobo Girls’ Secondary School for two years. In 1999, he became assistant headmaster of the Dzomoa Roman Catholic Junior Secondary School. He later became a deputy director at the Ghana Education Service.

== Politics ==
Kwao became active in party politics from the onset of the fourth Republic. He was the constituency chairman of the National Democratic Congress (NDC) between 1992 and 1993. He contested in the 2000 Ghanaian parliamentary election on the ticket of the NDC, winning by a margin of 8,644. He successfully retained his seat in the December 2004 election with a total of 15,764 making 60.90% of the total votes cast. He maintained his seat again in the 2008 Ghanaian general elections with a total of 14,398 making 66.87% of the total votes cast. In 2009, President Mills appointed Kwao as Minister for Employment and Social Welfare. He was moved to the Office of the President as a Minister of State in a cabinet reshuffle in January 2010.

== Personal ==
Stephen Kwao is a Christian and is married with four children.

== See also ==
- List of Mills government ministers
- National Democratic Congress

Parliament of Ghana
Preceded by Solomon Tettey Terkper	Upper Manya; 2001 – present	Incumbent
Political offices
Preceded by ?	Minister for Employment and Social Welfare; 2009 – 2010	Succeeded by Enoch Teye Mensah
