= Enoch Teye Mensah =

Ghanaian politician (1946–2023)

Hon. Enoch Teye Mensah

Member of the Ghana Parliament for Ningo-Prampram
- In office January 1997 – January 2017
- Preceded by: Stanley Basil Bade Carboo
- Succeeded by: Sam George
- Majority: 12,143

Minister for Water Resources, Works and Housing
- In office 2012–2012
- President: John Atta Mills
- Preceded by: Alban Bagbin
- Succeeded by: Collins Dauda

Minister for Employment and Social Welfare
- In office January 2010 – January 2012
- President: John Atta Mills
- Preceded by: Stephen Amoanor Kwao
- Succeeded by: Moses Asaga

Minister for Youth and Sports
- In office January 1993 – January 2001
- President: Jerry Rawlings
- Preceded by: Arnold Quainoo
- Succeeded by: Mallam Issah

Personal details
- Born: 17 May 1946 Koforidua, Gold Coast
- Died: 1 October 2023 (aged 77) South Africa
- Party: National Democratic Congress
- Children: 7
- Committees: Public Accounts Committee; House Committee; Finance Committee; Mines and Energy; Trade, Industry and Tourism
- Awards: Companion of the Order of the Volta

Enoch Teye Mensah (17 May 1946 – 1 October 2023), commonly known as E. T. Mensah, was a Ghanaian politician. He was a Member of Parliament for Ningo-Prampram from 7 January 1997 to 7 January 2017 and held ministerial offices in the presidential administrations of Jerry Rawlings from 1993 to 2001 and John Atta Mills from 2010 to 2012 in Ghana.

== Early life and education ==
Mensah was born on 17 May 1946 and came from Prampram in the Greater Accra Region Ghana. He schooled at the SNAPS College of Accountancy, which he completed in 1968. He also had his RSA III in 1970, and he became a fellow of the Institute of Financial Accountants in 1986. He was an Account Officer and worked at the University of Ghana, Legon as Accounting Officer.

== Political career ==
=== As Mayor of Accra ===
During the time of the PNDC military regime in Ghana, he was the long time Chief Executive of the Accra Metropolitan Assembly (AMA), akin to being the Mayor of the City of Accra. He joined the National Democratic Congress when it was formed in 1992.

=== As Member of Parliament ===
Mensah was a Ghanaian politician and stood for the Ghanaian parliamentary election in 1996. He was elected member of Parliament for the Ningo-Prampram constituency, holding the seat for almost a decade. He first went into parliament after he was elected as a member of Parliament of the second parliament of the fourth republic of Ghana during the 1996 Ghanaian General Election. After the NDC lost the 2000 elections, he continued as a member of parliament, winning subsequent elections in 2004, 2008 and 2012, and maintaining his seat until 2016. He once served as the Minority Chief Whip in parliament prior to the Ghanaian parliamentary election in 2008. In January 2009, when the NDC won majority in parliament, he became the Majority Chief Whip in parliament.

On 21 November 2015, Mensah lost the NDC parliamentary primaries to Sam George, bringing an end to his 20 years tenure in parliament.

=== As Minister of State ===
At the beginning of The Fourth Republic, he was appointed Minister for Youth and Sports by President Jerry Rawlings. Mensah held that position through both terms of the Rawlings government. In January 2010, after a cabinet reshuffle, President John Atta Mills appointed him Minister for Employment and Social Welfare.

Mensah was a member of the Pan-African Parliament until January 2009, when he resigned after being appointed a member of state. In January 2011, he was appointed Minister for Education following the resignation of Betty Mould-Iddrisu.

On 12 February 2021, Mensah was unanimously elected as the representative of Council of State for the Greater Accra Region.

== Personal life and death ==
Mensah was married with seven children: Apostle Benjamin Mensah, Humphrey Mensah (deceased), Enoch T Mensah, Dr. Michael T Mensah, MD, MPH, Rev. Mrs. Naomi Antwi, Jerry T Mensah, Bernice Mensah, He died in South Africa on 1 October 2023, at the age of 77.

== Honours ==
Mensah was awarded the Companion of the Order of the Volta by President Kufuor's government.

== See also ==
- Rawlings government
- List of Mills government ministers

Parliament of Ghana
Preceded by	Member of Parliament for Ningo-Prampram; 1997–2017	Succeeded by Sam Nartey George
Political offices
Preceded by Arnold Quainoo	Minister for Youth and Sports; 1993–2001	Succeeded by Mallam Issah
Preceded by Stephen Amoanor Kwao	Minister for Employment and Social Welfare; 2010–2012	Succeeded by Moses Asaga
Preceded by Alban Bagbin	Minister for Water Resources, Works and Housing; 2012	Succeeded by Collins Dauda
