= Brett Mason =

Australian politician (born 1962)

His Excellency The Honourable Brett Mason
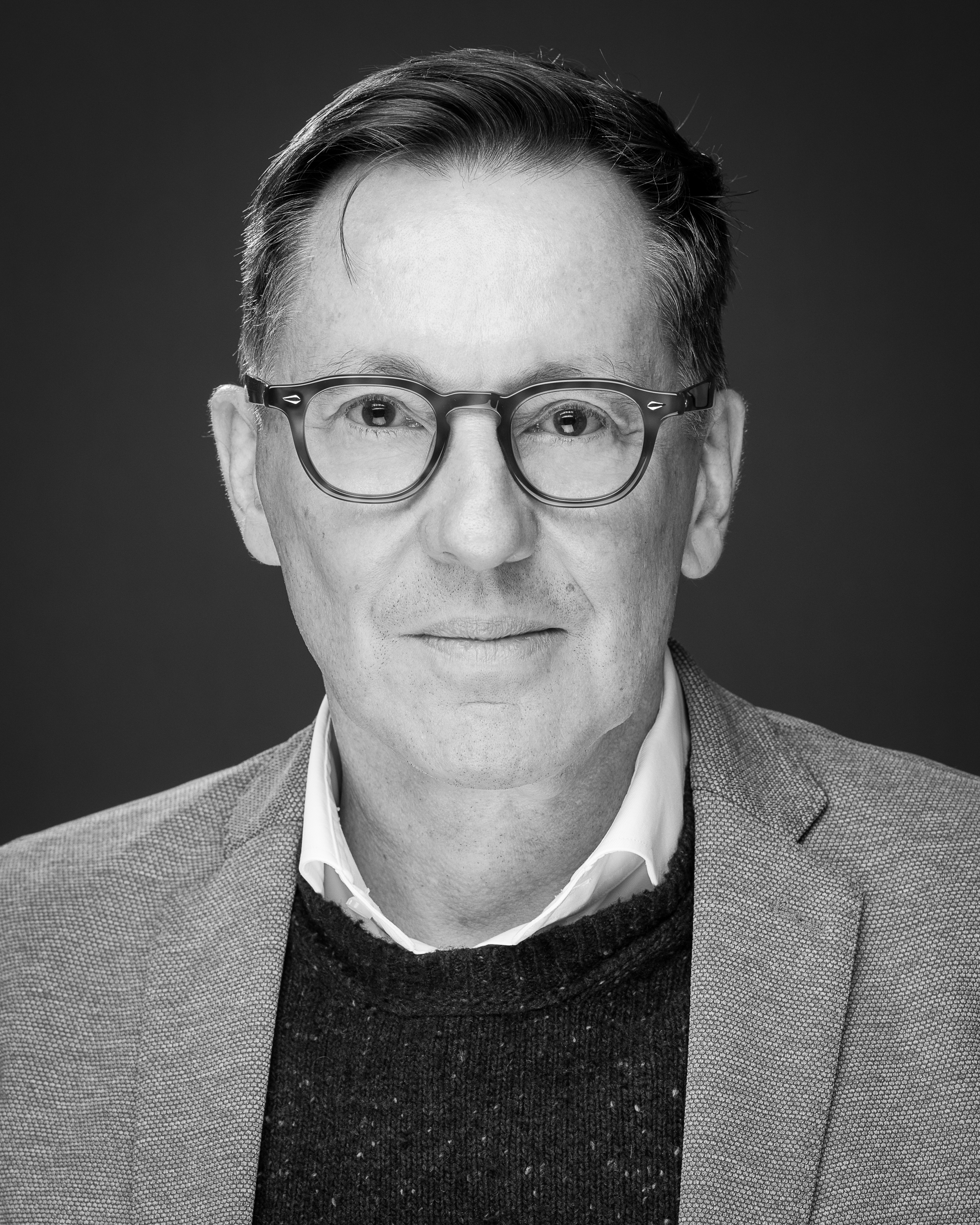

Australian Ambassador to the Netherlands
- In office 2 September 2015 – August 2018
- Preceded by: Neil Mules
- Succeeded by: Matthew Neuhaus

Senator for Queensland
- In office 1 July 1999 – 15 April 2015
- Succeeded by: Joanna Lindgren

Personal details
- Born: 5 March 1962 (age 64) Canberra, Australia
- Party: Liberal National Party of Queensland; Liberal Party of Australia
- Education: Australian National University; University of Cambridge; Griffith University
- Profession: Barrister

Brett John Mason (born 5 March 1962) is an Australian former politician and diplomat. He was a Liberal/Liberal National of Queensland member of the Australian Senate from 1 July 1999 to 15 April 2015, representing the state of Queensland. Mason was the Australian Ambassador to the Netherlands from September 2015 to August 2018.

== Education ==
Mason completed BA and LLB(Hons) degrees at the Australian National University, an MPhil degree in International Relations at Trinity Hall, University of Cambridge, and a PhD degree at Griffith University.

== Parliamentary career ==
Following Mason's entry into the Senate in 1999, he was appointed Parliamentary Secretary to the Minister for Health and Ageing in the Howard government from 21 March 2007 to 3 December 2007, and appointed Parliamentary Secretary to the Minister for Foreign Affairs in the Abbott government from 18 September 2013 to 23 December 2014.

Along with senators Mitch Fifield and Mathias Cormann, Mason was one of the first to resign from the Coalition front bench in 2009 over the Shadow Cabinet's decision to support Kevin Rudd's ETS.

On 24 March 2015, Mason announced he intended to resign from the Senate prior to the parliament's budget sittings in May. He resigned on 15 April 2015. The casual vacancy resulting from his resignation was filled by the appointment of Joanna Lindgren on 21 May 2015.

== Diplomatic career ==
On 21 April 2015, six days after his resignation from the Senate, Foreign Minister Julie Bishop announced that Mason would be appointed as Australia's ambassador to the Netherlands, replacing Neil Mules in mid-2015. Mason presented his credentials in the Netherlands on 2 September 2015. He completed his posting in August 2018.

In June 2018 Mason was appointed the chair of the National Library of Australia's Library Council, commencing on 9 August 2018.

== Honours ==
- Humanitarian Overseas Service Medal, 2003.

== Publications ==
- Mason, Brett (2006). Privacy without principle : the use and abuse of privacy in Australian law and public policy. Melbourne, Vic.: Australian Scholarly Publishing. ISBN 1-74097-111-6. OCLC 70257406.
- Mason, Brett (2013). Wood, Daniel (ed.). Future Proofing Australia : the Right Answers for Our Future. Carlton: Melbourne University Publishing. ISBN 978-0-522-86246-1. OCLC 830167199.
- Mason, Brett (2022). Wizards of Oz : how Oliphant and Florey helped win the war and shape the modern world. Sydney, NSW. ISBN 978-1-74223-854-8. OCLC 1345458814.

Diplomatic posts
Preceded by Neil Mules	Australian Ambassador to the Netherlands; 2015 – 2018	Succeeded by Matthew Neuhaus
