= Antoakrom =

- Town
- Location within Ghana
- Coordinates: 6°27′0″N 1°48′0″W
- Country: Ghana
- Region: Ashanti Region
- District: Amansie West District
- Time zone: GMT
  - Summer (DST): GMT

Antoakrom, also known as Antoakurom and Antobiakrom, is a small town in Manso in the Amansie West District in the Ashanti Region of Ghana. The town is located 12 miles southeast of the district capital Manso Nkwanta, and it is situated at the junction of two roads that link it to Bekwai to the east and Kumasi to the north.

Agriculture is the mainstay of the local economy. Cocoa has been grown in the area for a long time, other crops cultivated here include oil palm, maize, plantain, cassava, cocoyam, yam and rice. Antoakrom was a local administrative centre for the health service and cocoa production in the area since colonial time until its administrative function was moved to Manso Nkwanta. The town has a clinic and several banks. The people in the area are mainly the Akans, some of its inhabitants are Northerners who settled here to farm after prospecting for gold found in nearby regions.
