= Nabdam (Ghana parliament constituency) =

Ghana parliament constituency

- constituency for the Parliament of Ghana
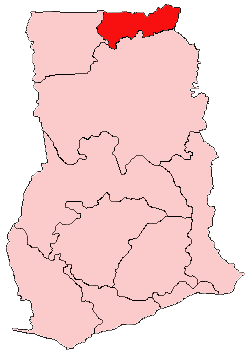
- District: Talensi-Nabdam District
- Region: Upper East Region of Ghana

Current constituency
- Party: National Democratic Congress
- MP: Mark Kurt Nawaane

Nabdam is one of the constituencies represented in the Parliament of Ghana. It elects one Member of Parliament (MP) by the first past the post system of election. Mark Kurt Nawaane is the member of parliament for the constituency. Nabdam is located in the Talensi-Nabdam district of the Upper East Region of Ghana.

== Boundaries ==
The seat is located within the Talensi-Nabdam District in the Upper East Region of Ghana.

== Members of Parliament ==
Election	Member	Party
1992	Danzi Paul Kpal	National Democratic Congress
1996	Moses Aduku Asaga	National Democratic Congress

== Elections ==
Election	Member	Party
1992	Danzi Paul Kpal	National Democratic Congress
1996	Moses Aduku Asaga	National Democratic Congress

== Elections ==
2012 Ghanaian parliamentary election: Nabdam Source:Ghana Home Page
Party	Candidate	Votes	%	±%
New Patriotic Party	Boniface Gambila Adagbila	7,097	50.81	
National Democratic Congress	Moses Aduku Asaga	6,545	46.86	
Progressive People's Party	Ditamina G Emmanuel	175	1.25	
People's National Convention	Kurug David	98	0.70	
Convention People's Party	Tampugre Ayenyeta William	52	0.37	
Majority		552	4.0	
Turnout		13,967		—

2008 Ghanaian parliamentary election: Nabdam Source:Ghana Home Page
Party	Candidate	Votes	%	±%
National Democratic Congress	Moses Aduku Asaga	5,369	47.8	
New Patriotic Party	Boniface Gambila Adagbila	5,097	45.4	
People's National Convention	Dr. Somtim Tobiga	715	6.4	
Convention People's Party	Tampugre Ayenyeta William	49	0.4	
Majority		372	2.4	
Turnout				—

== See also ==
- List of Ghana Parliament constituencies
