= Mankralo =

Term among the Gas in Ghana

Among the Gas of the Greater Accra Region, the mankralo is a person of high authority whose responsibilities include relaying information about happenings in the community to the people. In Teshie, a Ga community, the mankralo is selected by the three ruling houses. The position carries great prestige because of the opportunities that accompany it.
