= Theophilus Tetteh Chaie =

Ghanaian politician

Member of Parliament for Ablekuma Central Constituency
- In office 7 January 2009 – 6 January 2017
- Preceded by: Victor Okuley Nortey
- Succeeded by: Ebenezer Gilbert Nii Narh Nartey

Personal details
- Born: 4 April 1972 (age 54) Osudoku, Greater Accra Region Ghana)
- Party: National Democratic Congress
- Children: 1
- Education: Chartered Institute of Marketing, UK
- Occupation: Politician
- Profession: Educationist

Theophilus Tetteh Chaie (born April 4, 1972) is a Ghanaian politician and member of the Sixth Parliament of the Fourth Republic representing the Ablekuma Central Constituency in the Greater Accra Region of Ghana.

== Personal life ==
Chaie is a Christian and a member of the Methodist Church. He is married with one child.

== Early life and education ==
Chaie was born on April 4, 1972. He hails from Osudoku, a town in the Greater Accra Region of Ghana. He graduated from the Chartered Institute of Marketing, UK, and obtained his Certificate in marketing in 1981.

== Politics ==
Chaie was first elected into Parliament in the ticket of the National Democratic Congress (NDC) representing Ablekuma Central Constituency in January 2009. He polled 43,253 votes representing 51.01%. In 2012, he contested for re-election into the Ablekuma Central parliamentary seat on the ticket of the NDC sixth parliament of the fourth republic and won with 43,253 votes out of the 84,785 valid votes cast in his Constituency.

== Career ==
Chaie was the Headmaster of St. Charles Preparatory School in Accra and an educationist, before taking the appointment as a member of Parliament.
