= Berenice Owen-Jones =

Australian public servant and diplomat

Her Excellency Berenice Owen-Jones
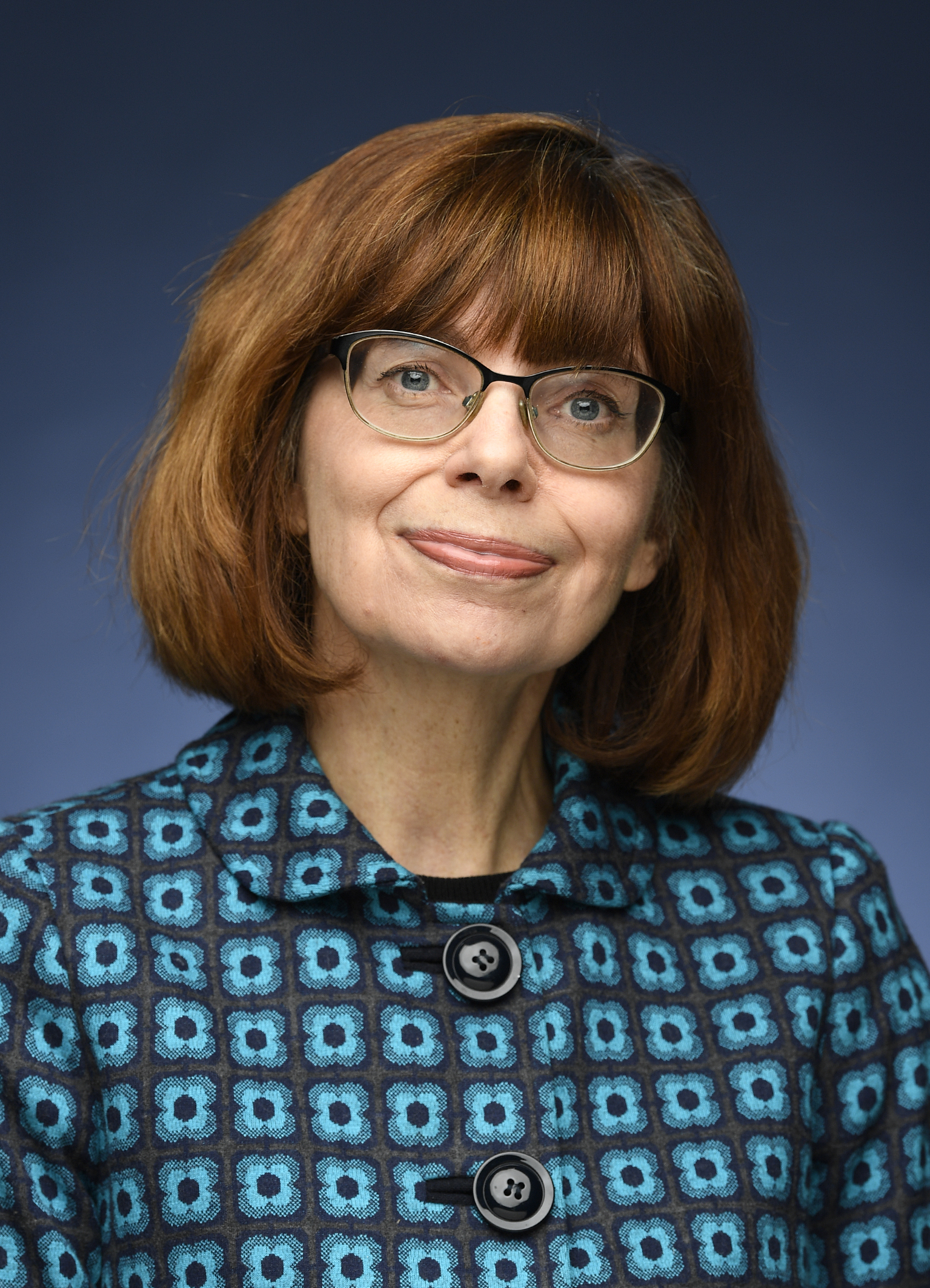
- Official portrait as High Commissioner to Ghana

High Commissioner of Australia to Ghana
- Incumbent
- Assumed office 6 July 2022
- Prime Minister: Anthony Albanese
- Preceded by: Gregory Andrews

Ambassador of Australia to Morocco
- In office 1 June 2017 – 30 October 2020
- Preceded by: Stephen Brady
- Succeeded by: Michael Cutts

Personal details
- Spouse: Robert Owen-Jones
- Children: 3
- Education: Australian National University

Berenice Owen-Jones is an Australian diplomat who is currently Australian High Commissioner to Ghana since July 2022.

== Diplomatic career ==
Owen-Jones earned a Bachelor of Economics, and a Diploma of International Law, from the Australian National University in 1987 and 1988, respectively.

Owen-Jones joined the public service in 1988, and has served in the Department of Trade, the Office of National Assessments, and the Department of Foreign Affairs and Trade. From 1999 to 2001, she was First Secretary at the Australian Embassy in Paris, and was a ministerial speechwriter for the Minister for Foreign Affairs, Alexander Downer and then Stephen Smith, from 2006 to 2008. In 2016-2017, she was Director of Studies of the Diplomatic Academy.

In June 2017, Owen-Jones was appointed as the first resident Australian Ambassador to Morocco, tasked with establishing the new embassy. Serving as ambassador until October 2020, Owen-Jones was awarded the rank of Commander of the Order of Ouissam Alaouite by King Mohammed VI of Morocco, being presented with the award by the Moroccan ambassador to Australia, Karim Medrek, on 22 February 2021.

On 6 July 2022, she was appointed Australian High Commissioner to Ghana, with non-resident accreditation for Burkina Faso, Cote d’Ivoire, Guinea, Liberia, Mali, Senegal, Sierra Leone, and Togo. She presented her letters of commission to the President of Ghana, Nana Akufo-Addo, on 27 September 2022.

Diplomatic posts
Preceded by Stephen Brady (non-resident)	Australian Ambassador to Morocco; 2017–2020	Succeeded by Michael Cutts
Preceded by Gregory Andrews	Australian High Commissioner to Ghana; 2022–present	Incumbent
