= Ningo-Prampram =

Ghana parliament constituency

- constituency for the Parliament of Ghana
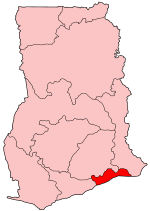
- District: Ningo-Prampram District
- Region: Greater Accra Region of Ghana

Current constituency
- Created: 1992
- Party: National Democratic Congress
- MP: Sam Nartey George

The Ningo-Prampram Constituency is one of the constituencies represented in the Parliament of Ghana. The constituency derives its name from the two towns located within the constituency. The towns are the much larger and older Ningo and the relatively younger Prampram which is much smaller. It elects one Member of Parliament (MP) by the first past the post system of election. Ningo-Prampram is located in the Ningo-Prampram District of the Greater Accra Region of Ghana. Central University College has a campus at Miotso near Prampram and plans are underway to relocate its other campuses to Ningo-Prampram. Hope City which was initially planned to be built at Kasoa has also been relocated here. Plans are also underway to build the new international airport at a location near Ningo.

== Members of Parliament ==
Election	Member	Party	Ref
1992	Stanley Basil Bade Carboo	National Democratic Congress	
1996	Enoch Teye Mensah	National Democratic Congress	
2016	Sam George Nartey	National Democratic Congress	
2020	Sam George Nartey	National Democratic Congress	
2024	Sam George Nartey	National Democratic Congress	

== Elections ==
2008 Ghanaian parliamentary election: Ningo-Prampram Sources: Ghana Home Page
Party	Candidate	Votes	%	±%
National Democratic Congress	Enoch Teye Mensah	18,339	71.5	
New Patriotic Party	Abed Tawiah Okorno	6,196	24.1	
Independent	Christian Chartey Zuttah	639	2.5	
Convention People's Party	Abdulai Nii Martey	487	1.9	
Majority		12,143	47.4	
Turnout				—

== See also ==
- List of Ghana Parliament constituencies
- Parliamentary constituencies in the Greater Accra Region
