= Matthew Neuhaus =

Australian diplomat

Hon Professor Matthew Neuhaus
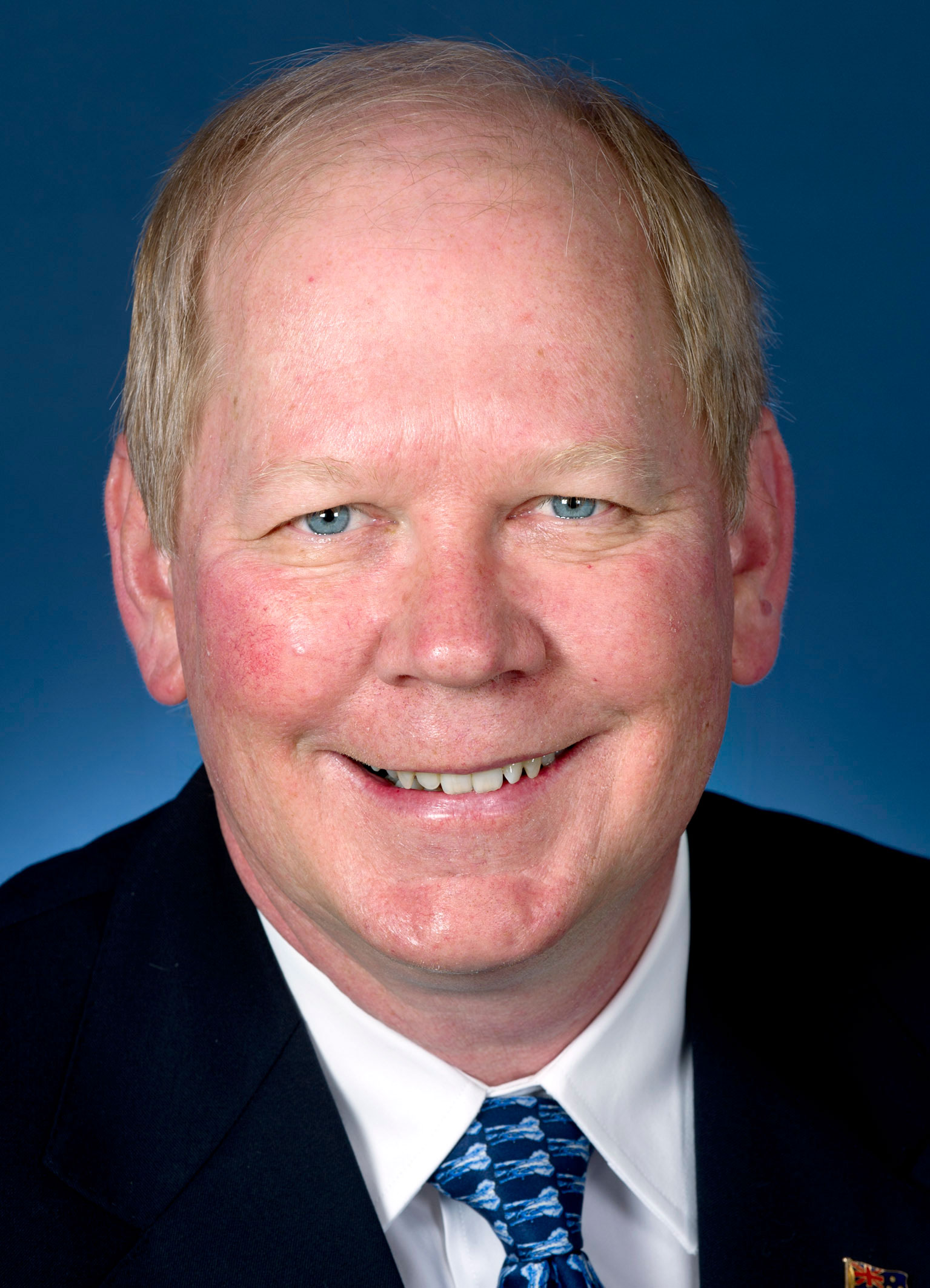

Australian Ambassador to the Netherlands
- In office 29 August 2018 – 28 October 2022
- Preceded by: Brett Mason

Personal details
- Born: 16 August 1958 (age 67) Sydney, Australia
- Spouse: Angela Neuhaus
- Profession: Diplomat

Matthew Ernest Keith Neuhaus (born 16 August 1958) is an Honorary Professor (International Law) at the Australian National University and former Australian diplomat who was appointed as the Australian Ambassador to the Netherlands on 29 August 2018 till October 2022.

== Early life and education ==
Neuhaus was born on August 16, 1958, in Sydney, Australia to Reverend Theodore Neuhaus and Yvonne Neuhaus. He spent much of his childhood (1960–1974) in the central region of Tanzania where his parents worked as Anglican Missionaries.

Neuhaus completed his secondary education at St Andrew's Cathedral School in Sydney (1974–75) before studying a Bachelor of Arts (Honours) and a Bachelor of Laws at the University of Sydney (1976–81). He later completed a Masters of Philosophy in International Relations at the University of Cambridge (1985–86).

In June 2006, he attended the Harvard University Kennedy School Leaders in Development Program, and was a visiting fellow at the University of Cambridge in 1994 and 2015.

== Career ==
Neuhaus joined the Australian Department of Foreign Affairs in 1982 and has held posts both overseas and in Australia. Most recently he has been appointed as the Australian Ambassador to the Netherlands (2018–present) and headed the Middle East and Africa Division (2017–18).

In August 1983, Neuhaus went on his first overseas posting when he was appointed third secretary at the Australian Embassy in Nairobi, Kenya - reporting also on Ethiopia, Somalia, Uganda and Seychelles. Upon finishing this posting, he studied at The University of Cambridge (Trinity Hall) in 1985 with an Australian Public Service Board Scholarship. His MPhil thesis examined the Commonwealth's role in negotiating Zimbabwe's Independence.

In 1991, he was appointed First Secretary, later Counsellor (covering legal, disarmament and Security Council) to Australia's Mission to the United Nations (UN) in New York (1991–1994). He was the Vice Chairman of the Sixth Committee at the UN General Assembly (1993–94) and Vice Chairman of the ad hoc committee on the Indian Ocean Zone of Peace. Later in 1994 he returned to the University of Cambridge as a visiting fellow in the Centre for International Studies where he wrote on the UN Security role.

From 1997 to 2000, Neuhaus was appointed as Australian High Commissioner to Nigeria – accredited also to Ghana, Sierra Leone, Senegal and The Gambia. He presented his credentials to General Sani Abacha and was actively engaged in supporting the return to democracy in 1999 under President Olusegun Obasanjo.

In 2001, on returning from Nigeria, Neuhaus joined the Department of the Prime Minister and Cabinet as a senior advisor to the International Division. He had particular responsibility for the policy advice to Prime Minister John Howard as Chair of the Commonwealth Heads of Government Meeting (CHOGM) held in Coolum, Queensland, Australia in February 2002.

In October 2002, Neuhaus was appointed to the position of Director of the Political Affairs Division of the Commonwealth Secretariat in London, firstly under the Secretary General Sir Don McKinnon of New Zealand and then Kamalesh Sharma of India. In this role he helped organise, and was Conference Secretary to three CHOGM – Nigeria (2003), Malta (2005), Uganda (2007). He also oversaw Commonwealth democracy and election work, and was involved in conflict resolution in Pakistan, Fiji, Kenya, Guyana, Maldives and Tanzania/Zanzibar.

In 2009. following the end of his term at the Commonwealth Secretariat, he returned to DFAT in Canberra. He was appointed firstly as Head of an Africa Policy Taskforce, advising on a re-engagement strategy for the Australian Government with Africa. He was then appointed as Head of the Pacific Engagement Taskforce with responsibility for organising the Pacific Islands Forum (PIF) Summit in Cairns (2009), and support to the Australian Prime Minister Kevin Rudd as PIF Chair 2009–10. He subsequently established the Commonwealth Heads of Government meeting (CHOGM) Policy Task Force (2010), preparing for the Perth Summit in 2011.

In January 2011, Neuhaus was appointed as Australian Ambassador to Zimbabwe (also accredited to Democratic Republic of Congo, Malawi and Zambia). He presented his Credentials to President Robert Mugabe in March 2011 and led Australian engagement with the Zimbabwean power sharing government of national unity under President Mugabe and Prime Minister Morgan Tsvangirai.

In 2015 he returned to the University of Cambridge as a visiting fellow at the Lauterpacht Centre for International Law where he worked on two projects - Reform of the Commonwealth Secretariat and Peace building in Africa.

Neuhaus’ extensive personal, academic and professional experience in foreign affairs, particularly in Africa, led to his next appointment as DFAT's Assistant Secretary, Africa Branch (2015–17) and then First Assistant Secretary and Head of the Middle East and Africa Division (2017–2018).

On June 8, 2018, Australia's Minister for Foreign Affairs Julie Bishop announced the appointment of Matthew Neuhaus as Australia's next Ambassador to the Netherlands, taking over from Brett Mason. Neuhaus presented his credentials in the Netherlands on 29 August 2018 to his Majesty King Willem-Alexander, and as Australia's Permanent Representative to the OPCW, to Director General Fernando Arias the same day.

Following the completion of his posting in October 2022 and retirement Neuhaus was appointed Honorary Professor (International Law) at the Australian National University School of Law.

He has been President of the Royal Commonwealth Society ACT Australia since 2023

== Personal life ==
Mathew Neuhaus married Angela Margaret Low on July 13, 1991. Angela is the eldest Daughter of the late Professor D.A. Low, former Vice Chancellor of Australian National University and President of Clare Hall, University of Cambridge (1987–1994). They have one daughter born in 1992.

== Coat of Arms ==
Coat of arms of Matthew Neuhaus

Adopted
2012
Crest
On a Helm with a Wreath Or and Azure: A demi Horse Sable maned tailed and unguled Or supporting between its forelegs a Long Cross Or voided Sable.
Escutcheon
Azure between two Bars a Lion rampant Or holding a Long Cross Or voided Sable between two Mullets of eight points the whole between two Mullets of eight points in pale Or.

== Key publications ==
- M. Neuhaus and Greg Hammond (1982), Diplomatic privileges and the International Court of Justice – Protection or Platitudes? United States vs Iran, Sydney Law Review. Vol 9 (3) p. 649
- M. Neuhaus (1988) A useful Chogm: Lusaka 1979, Australian Outlook, 42:3, 161–166, DOI: 10.1080/10357718808444978
- M. Neuhaus (1995) The United Nations Security Role at Fifty – The need for Realism, Australian Journal of International Affairs, Vol 49(2) p. 267-282
- M. Neuhaus (1995) Sovereignty, alliances and international responsibility Australia's accession to the 1997 Geneva Protocol. Treaty Making and Australia: Globalisation Versus Sovereignty, p. 141-148, 292–294.
- M. Neuhaus (2015) Renewing the Commonwealth—A Reform Agenda for a New Secretary-General, The Round Table, 104:5, 539–549, DOI: 10.1080/00358533.2015.1090794
