= Upper Manya (Ghana parliament constituency) =

Ghana parliament constituency

- constituency for the Parliament of Ghana
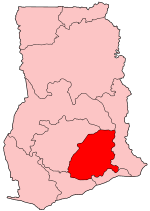
- District: Manya Krobo District
- Region: Eastern Region of Ghana

Current constituency
- Party: National Democratic Congress
- MP: Bismark Tetteh Nyarko

Upper Manya is one of the constituencies represented in the Parliament of Ghana. It elects one Member of Parliament (MP) by the first past the post system of election. Upper Manya is located in the Manya Krobo district of the Eastern Region of Ghana.

== Boundaries ==
The seat is located within the Manya Krobo District of the Eastern Region of Ghana.

== Members of Parliament ==
Election	Member	Party
1992	Charles Tei Sawer	National Convention Party
1996	Solomon Tettey Terkper	National Democratic Congress
2000	Stephen Amoanor Kwao	National Democratic Congress

== Elections ==
2008 Ghanaian parliamentary election: Upper Manya Source:Ghana Home Page
Party	Candidate	Votes	%	±%
National Democratic Congress	Stephen Amoanor Kwao	14,398	66.9	6.0
New Patriotic Party	Gustov Jonathan Narh Dometey	6,639	30.8	−7.5
People's National Convention	Tei Gideon Kpabitey	315	1.5	0.6
Convention People's Party	Francis Teye Kwadjo	178	0.8	—
Majority		7,759	36.1	13.5
Turnout		—	—	—

2004 Ghanaian parliamentary election: Upper Manya Source:Electoral Commission of Ghana & Friedrich Ebert Foundation
Party	Candidate	Votes	%	±%
National Democratic Congress	Stephen Amoanor Kwao	15,764	60.9	0.0
New Patriotic Party	Jonathan Narh-Dometey Gustav	9,912	38.3	22.0
People's National Convention	Ransford Nartey Matey	225	0.9	−1.4
Majority		5,852	22.6	−22.0
Turnout		25,901	84.0	—

2000 Ghanaian parliamentary election: Upper Manya Source:Adam Carr's Election Archives
Party	Candidate	Votes	%	±%
National Democratic Congress	Stephen Amoanor Kwao	11,795	60.9	3.1
New Patriotic Party	Joe Sam	3,151	16.3	6.4
National Reform Party	Charles Kwesi Narh	2,631	13.6	—
Convention People's Party	Solomon Tettey Terkper	1,090	5.6	—
People's National Convention	Martin Adama Okai	452	2.3	0.1
United Ghana Movement	Kwadjo Francis Teye	261	1.3	—
Majority		8,644	44.6	4.9
Turnout		—	—	—

1996 Ghanaian parliamentary election: Upper Manya Source:Electoral Commission of Ghana
Party	Candidate	Votes	%	±%
National Democratic Congress	Solomon Tettey Terkper	15,390	57.8	—
Independent	Emmanuel Ansah Nartey	4,827	18.1	—
National Convention Party	Charles Kwesi Narh	3,173	11.9	—
New Patriotic Party	Joe Sam	2,644	9.9	—
People's National Convention	Martin Adama Okai	587	2.2	—
Majority		10,563	39.7	—
Turnout		26,621	74.9	53.1

1992 Ghanaian parliamentary election: Upper Manya Source:Electoral Commission of Ghana
Party	Candidate	Votes	%	±%
National Convention Party	Charles Tei Sawer	—	—	—
Majority		—	—	—
Turnout		8,574	21.8	—

== See also ==
- List of Ghana Parliament constituencies
