= Old Ningo =

Town in the Greater Accra Region of Ghana

Old Ningo Great Ningo
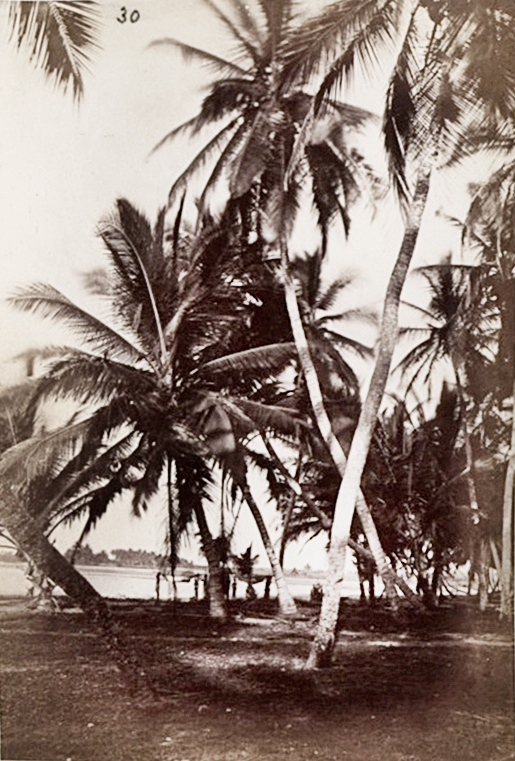
- Old Ningo, 1870s
- Interactive map of Old Ningo
- Coordinates: 5°45′N 0°11′E
- Country: Ghana
- Region: Greater Accra Region

Old Ningo is a town in the Greater Accra Region of Ghana.

== History ==
Also known as Great Ningo, the inhabitants have always been a fishing and farming community. They form part of the Ga-Adangbe people. The name Ningo has a much more widely known and accepted history as derived from the Ga–Dangme words nu meaning water and ngoo meaning salt. However, there is compelling evidence pointing to a more interesting naming origin. The Encyclopædia Metropolitana, published in 1817, has this entry: "Ningo, near which the second Danish castle, Friedensburg, is placed, is 43 miles from Akra. In Krobo, or Krepe, a large Negro State behind it, there is a very high mountain about 20 or 25 miles distant from the sea, and capped with snow." This provides evidence of a voyager's inspired choice of name, since Ningo in Latin means snow, and the mariners would have seen the mountain in the backdrop of the native settlers and named the place Ningo. Many other early writings and references about Ningo also used the term "Ningo Grande" – grande translates from Latin as large or great. The name Great Ningo naturally followed. The people of Ningo refer to themselves as "Nugoli", meaning "People of Nugo" (Nugo being a more locally accepted pronunciation of the name Ningo), and are proud to associate themselves with the name Great Ningo. The history of the people of Ningo is closely linked to that of the Ga-Dangme people.

== Aboriginal name of Ningo ==
The original name for the people of Ningo is Lasibi. This is part of the eight groups of people who are identified as Dangme State: Adaa, Nugo, Gbugbla, Kpom, SƐ, Yilô-Klo, Manya-Klo and Osudoku; anglicised as: Ada, Ningo, Prampram, Kpone, Shai, Yilo Krobo, Manya Krobo and Osudoku respectively.

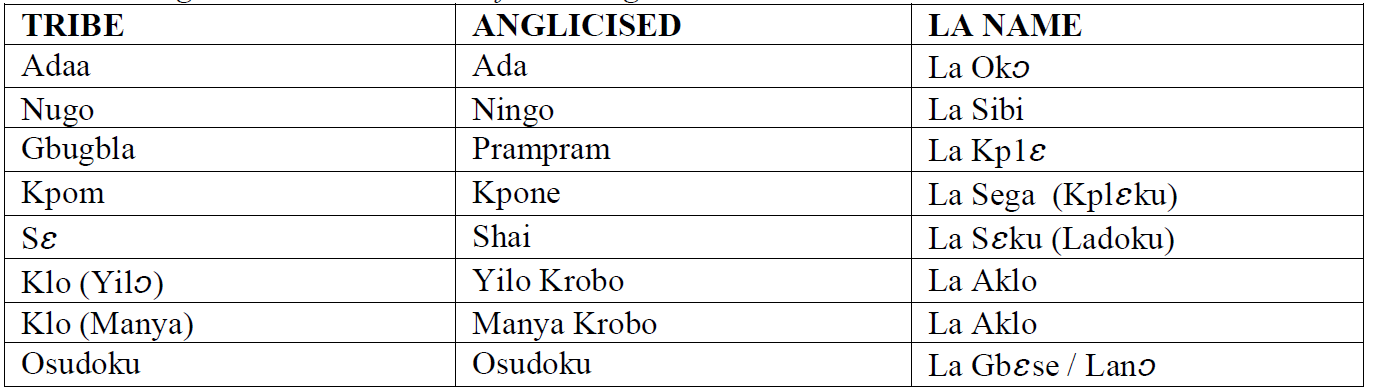

== Fort Fredensborg ==
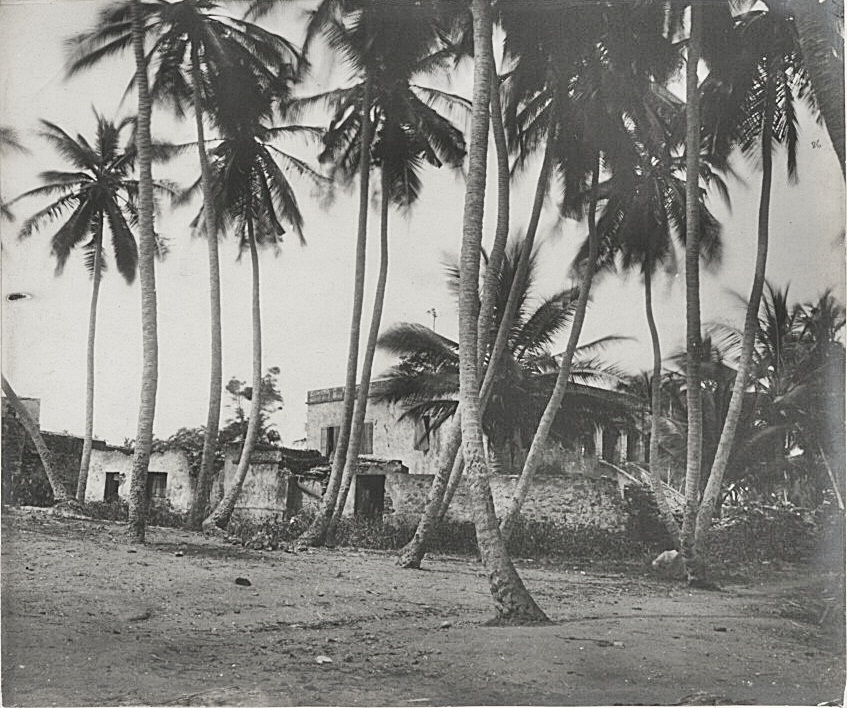
Ruins of Fort Fredensborg, Ningo, 1890s

The Danish were the first European settlers here, establishing Fort Fredensborg in 1734. The town was developed as a slave-trading station as part of Danish Guinea. However, with the abolition of the slave trade the town dwindled in size, with the fort staffed by a single person. The fort was already in ruins when the British took over on 8 March 1850 and incorporated the town into the Gold Coast. Christian Glob Dorf was Commandant from 21 June 1740 to 25 May 1743.

== Ningo clans ==
Ningo has four Divisions and clans under them. First Division:Lower. They hold the paramount chief position and djange wↄnↄ (priest). Clans under LowƐ are:

1. Adainya (Djangma We)
2. Asere
3. We Gobom
4. Ohenease (Ohluase)
5. Saunya
6. Aniamosi
7. Ma Momonor

Second Division: Lower Kponↄ They hold the Dzaase/Dzaas-TsƐ Position. Clans under Lowe Kponor are:

1. Odoi We (Mantse We)
2. Obonu We
3. Huago We
4. Adela We (Salosi)
5. Okubeng We
6. Tsawe - Se Agbla-nya
7. Osabunya

Third Division: Djangmaku They hold divisional chief position. Clans under Djangmaku are:

1. Adade We
2. Djange PiƐse
3. Saunsi
4. Dankyira
5. Kabueku
6. Suↄ Yi - nya
7. Manya Tsu
8. Manya Gↄtsonya (Akamisa wem)

Fourth Division: Kabiawe. They hold mankralo position. Clans under Kabiawe are:

1. LƐ Wem (Kↄↄley Tso sisi)
2. Anarhor
3. Alata (Akwadu-tso nya)
4. Bantama
5. Manya Yum (Mankralo Wem)

== Education ==
The town is also known for the Ningo High and Technical School regarded as having a pleasant environment. The school is a second cycle institution.
