= Despoja =

Despoja is a surname. Notable people with the surname include:

- Mario Despoja, Croatian Australian
- Natasha Stott Despoja (born 1969), Australian politician, diplomat, advocate, and author
- Shirley Stott Despoja (born 1936), Australian journalist
