= List of high commissioners of Australia to Malaysia =

High Commissioner of Australia to Malaysia

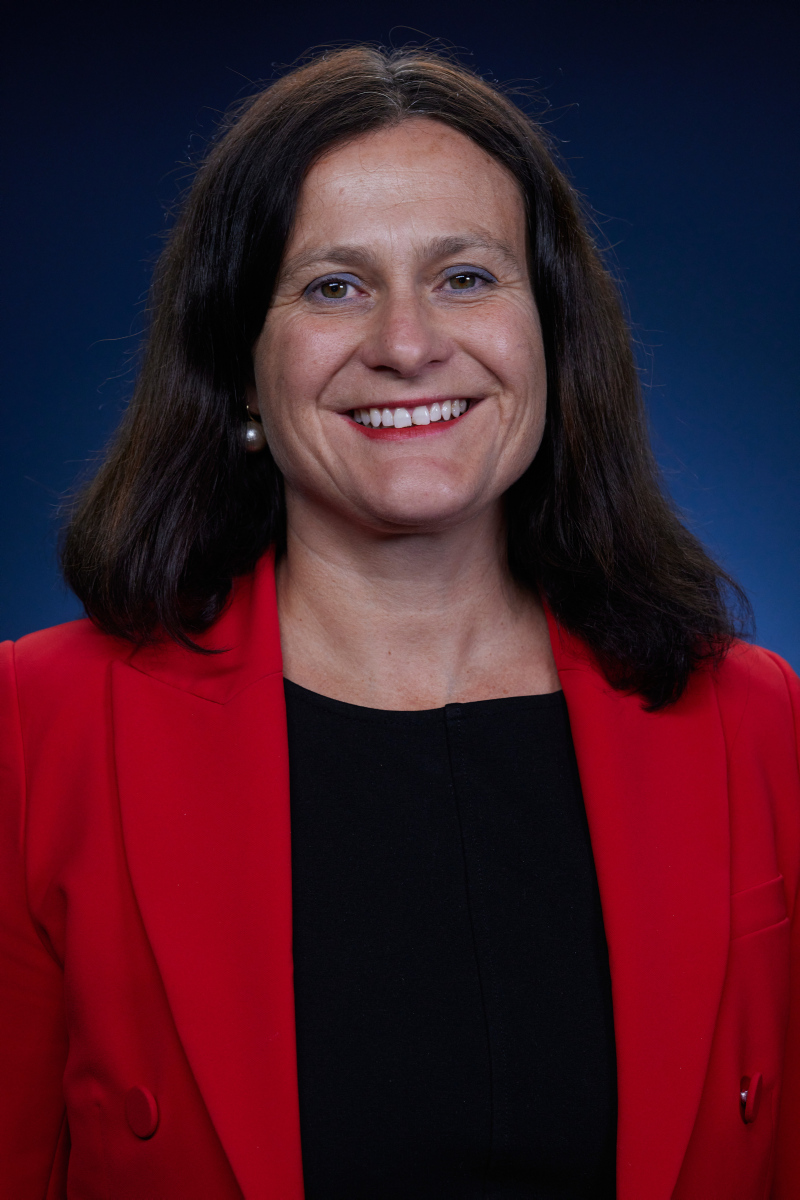
- Incumbent; Danielle Heinecke since 9 December 2023
- Department of Foreign Affairs and Trade
- Style: Her Excellency
- Reports to: Minister for Foreign Affairs
- Residence: 33, Jalan Langgak Golf, Kelab Golf di Raja Selangor, 55000 Kuala Lumpur, Malaysia
- Nominator: Prime Minister of Australia
- Appointer: Governor General of Australia
- Inaugural holder: Tom Critchley (Commissioner)
- Formation: 22 December 1955
- Website: Australian High Commission in Malaysia

The high commissioner of Australia to Malaysia is an officer of the Australian Department of Foreign Affairs and Trade and the head of the high commission of the Commonwealth of Australia to Malaysia based in Kuala Lumpur. The position has the rank and status of an ambassador extraordinary and plenipotentiary and is currently held by Her Excellency Ms Danielle Heinecke since December 2023.

== Posting history ==
On 11 November 1955, the minister for external affairs, Richard Casey, announced that Tom Critchley had been appointed to the newly created position of Australian commissioner to Malaya in Kuala Lumpur, noting that while "relations with the authorities in the Federation of Malaya had been conducted through the Australian Commissioner in Southeast Asia, Sir Alan Watt. The Australian Government believed that it was appropriate for Australia to have a full-time representative in Kuala Lumpur in the Federation of Malaya as important constitutional developments were carrying the Federation of Malaya to self-government."

Australia was one of 15 countries to establish formal diplomatic relations with the Federation of Malaya in 1957 soon after its independence, with the Australian commissioner to Malaya appointed high commissioner from 31 August 1957. With the formation of Malaysia on 16 September 1963, the Australian high commissioner to Malaya in Kuala Lumpur became a high commissioner, with the Australian commissioner for Singapore, Brunei, Sarawak, and North Borneo (resident in Singapore) becoming a subordinate Deputy High Commission to Malaysia until it was replaced by a high commissioner to an independent Singapore from 9 August 1965.

In 1973, as part of an effort to showcase Australian design in overseas diplomatic missions, the Commonwealth Government of Gough Whitlam commissioned Joyce Nankivell Associates, architects of Melbourne, to design the new High Commission chancery at No. 6, Jalan Yap Kwan Seng, Kuala Lumpur. Designed in a bold Brutalist style with an L-shape plan by Bernard Joyce and William Nankivell in association with local architects Leong Thian & Rakan-rakan on 29 January 1974, Australian Prime Minister Whitlam turned the first sod at the construction site during an official visit to Malaysia. The completed building was officially opened on 12 June 1978.

On 30 July 1979, the Australian high commissioner to Malaysia was appointed as the non-resident commissioner to Brunei, with a stated purpose to "facilitate contacts and closer cooperation with the Government of Brunei during the period leading up to Brunei's full independence in 1983". A resident Australian Commission in Brunei was established in March 1983 in anticipation of Brunei's independence on 1 January 1984.

In 2025, the Australian High Commission celebrates 70 years of Australia's diplomatic presence in Malaysia.

== Heads of mission ==
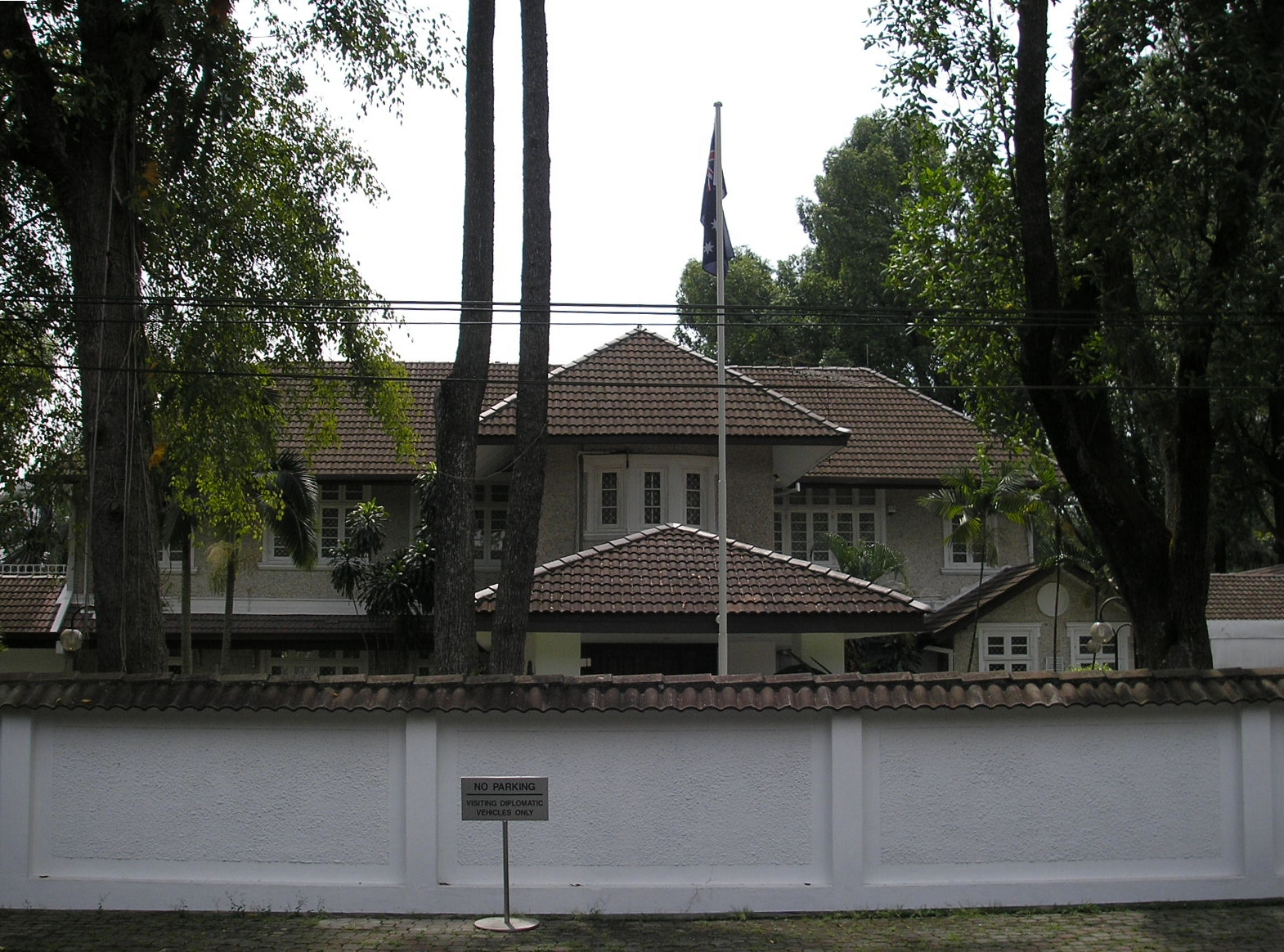
Official Residence of the Australian High Commissioner

#	Officeholder	Title	Other offices	Residency	Term start date	Term end date	Time in office	Notes
1	Claude Massey	Commissioner for Malaya and Southeast Asia	N/A	Singapore	21 March 1946	16 May 1950	4 years, 1 month	
2	Laurence McIntyre (Acting)	Commissioner for Malaya and Southeast Asia	N/A	Singapore	16 May 1950	10 April 1951	10 months	
3	Tom Critchley	Commissioner for Malaya and Southeast Asia	N/A	Singapore	11 April 1951	8 November 1952	1 year, 6 months	
4	Laurence McIntyre	Commissioner for Malaya and Southeast Asia	N/A	Singapore	9 November 1952	23 March 1954	1 year, 4 months	
5	Alan Watt	Commissioner for Malaya and Southeast Asia	N/A	Singapore	23 March 1954	22 December 1955	1 year, 8 months	
(3)	Tom Critchley	High Commissioner	^{A}	Kuala Lumpur	22 December 1955	2 November 1965	9 years, 10 months	
6	Nick Parkinson (Acting)	High Commissioner	N/A	Kuala Lumpur	2 November 1965	December 1965	29 days	
7	Allan Eastman	High Commissioner	N/A	Kuala Lumpur	December 1965	6 June 1969	3 years, 6 months	
8	John Rowland	High Commissioner	N/A	Kuala Lumpur	July 1969	December 1972	3 years, 5 months	
9	Alfred Parsons	High Commissioner	N/A	Kuala Lumpur	January 1973	April 1976	3 years, 3 months	
10	Graham Feakes	High Commissioner	^{B}	Kuala Lumpur	April 1976	April 1980	4 years	
11	Garry Woodard	High Commissioner	^{B}	Kuala Lumpur	April 1980	January 1984	3 years, 9 months	
12	David Evans	High Commissioner	N/A	Kuala Lumpur	January 1984	March 1987	3 years, 2 months	
13	Cavan Hogue	High Commissioner	N/A	Kuala Lumpur	March 1987	May 1990	3 years, 2 months	
14	Frank Murray	High Commissioner	N/A	Kuala Lumpur	May 1990	March 1993	2 years, 10 months	
15	John Dauth	High Commissioner	N/A	Kuala Lumpur	March 1993	March 1996	3 years	
16	Bill Farmer	High Commissioner	N/A	Kuala Lumpur	March 1996	March 1997	1 year	
17	Bob Cotton	High Commissioner	N/A	Kuala Lumpur	March 1997	February 2000	2 years, 11 months	
18	Peter Varghese	High Commissioner	N/A	Kuala Lumpur	February 2000	January 2003	2 years, 11 months	
19	James Wise	High Commissioner	N/A	Kuala Lumpur	January 2003	March 2007	4 years, 2 months	
20	Penny Williams	High Commissioner	N/A	Kuala Lumpur	March 2007	5 May 2010	3 years, 2 months	
21	Miles Kupa	High Commissioner	N/A	Kuala Lumpur	5 May 2010	26 November 2013	3 years, 6 months	
22	Rod Smith	High Commissioner	N/A	Kuala Lumpur	26 November 2013	20 November 2017	3 years, 11 months	
23	Andrew Goledzinowski	High Commissioner	N/A	Kuala Lumpur	20 November 2017	June 2021	3 years, 6 months	
24	Dr Justin Lee	High Commissioner	N/A	Kuala Lumpur	1 July 2021	July 2023	5 years, 2 months	
25	Danielle Heinecke	High Commissioner	N/A	Kuala Lumpur	9 December 2023	Incumbent	2 years, 8 months	

=== Notes ===
^A Commissioner to Malaya until 31 August 1957; High Commissioner to Malaya until 16 September 1963.
^B Also non-resident Commissioner to Brunei, 1979–1983.

== See also ==
- Australia–Malaysia relations
