= Bernard Hesling =

British born, Australian painter & cartoonist

Bernard Hesling

Bernard Hesling OAM (1905–1987) was a British-born muralist and painter who lived and worked in Australia and produced many vitreous enamel artworks and wrote humorous autobiographies.

== Early years ==
Hesling was from a Yorkshire family. He was born in 1905 while the family was temporarily in Wales. They returned to Yorkshire in 1907. He left school at age 15 and was apprenticed to a firm of painters and decorators. He studied art at Halifax night-school, where his teacher was the artist Joseph Mellor Hanson (1900–1963). At age 21 he went to London to try his hand at acting.

In 1960, Hesling reminisced about his 1926 debut as an actor and assistant Stage Manager at London’s Gate Theatre. To augment his meager wages he painted in his spare time and displayed his earthenware jugs and bowls in the theatre’s foyer. Norman Haire bought one and introduced himself. After the show they went to the Cafe Royal and Hesling was horrified because the 34-year-old Haire, ‘famous in Europe as he never was in his native land’, envied him, a 21-year-old, for being an actor. The stage manager worried that ‘a young innocent from the provinces’ had gone off with Haire ‘a professed homosexual’ but joked: ‘watch out for him, he’s a good bloke but never ask his advice about sex or he’ll send you a bill.’

In 1928, out of work in London and promised a job in Sydney, he migrated to Australia (for £16) and worked on Sydney shop-window displays at £6 a week. He had a room at Burdekin House, home to artists and writers. In 1929, he exhibited his abstract paintings but sold only three. He did not paint again seriously until 1943, when he became a part-time cartoonist. He was attracted to Sydney because of the prospect of a job and because his oldest brother, Charles, a gas engineer turner, migrated there in 1912. Charles died in a car accident at Lane Cove in 1931, aged 39, leaving a widow and young child.

Out of work again at the start of the Great Depression Bernard went back to London, where he worked first as a display artist at 9p an hour. In 1933 he married Flo’ (Florence Pickles) and became an art director at Elstree film studios, London, where he worked for three or four years. He returned to Sydney with Flo’ in 1939 with £50. They and other fit passengers served as U-boat spotters on the long voyage. For a short time he worked on accounts at Australia Paper Mills in Sydney.

In 1929, he became friendly with new residents at Sydney’s 'bush suburb’ Castlecrag and came to know its designer Walter Burley Griffin and his wife Marion Mahony Griffin. He described Griffin as "a small, plump atom bomb of a man in a broad-brimmed beaver hat, wearing a flowing Left Bank artist tie like an American in Paris". On returning to Sydney in 1939 Hesling resumed his interest in Castlecrag, where he and Flo’ settled in 1942.

== Draftsman, cartoonist, journalist and critic ==
During the war he did design work at Slazenger’s Munitions Annexe, Botany.(Artist Arthur Murch was there too.) In his spare time he drew daily cartoons for The Daily Telegraph, which caused some tension at Slazenger’s. Transferred later in the war to the Ministry of Munitions, Hesling worked with cartoonist George Molnar, who he said he prodded into becoming a cartoonist and who gave him lessons in drawing in return. Hesling left the Ministry about 1943 to work full-time on The Daily Telegraph and his naive outline-style cartoons on war, food shortages and manpower control became well known.

He later said of his political cartoons: “Had I stuck to comic sketches of American servicemen buying tickets for Il Trovatore on the black market and such like, all would have been well. But my drawing had improved so much by now that I could get passable likenesses of Eddie Ward and Mr. Curtin. Brian Penton [Telegraph editor] saw me as one of those political bores – the scorched-earth boys who draw Russian bears and rising suns using soot instead of ink. What he didn’t like about me, of course, was having to write letters about art to pedantic readers who objected to a Prime Minister with six fingers on the hand instead of five.”

Hesling wrote in 1966 that it was through artist William Dobell, who won the 1943 Archibald Prize, that 'I did my first serious writing: a 10,000 word biography of him in Penton's Daily Telegraph' While watching Dobell paint, Hesling decided to take up 'Art' again, 'not portraits but pussy cats like Bill's father painted and tigers and bush railway stations'. Dobell lent Hesling some of his untutored father's 'primitive' paintings and was soon able to paint in similar style.

The Telegraph sent him to Canberra, which he disliked, and he was fired in 1946. He moved briefly to the Sydney Morning Herald and then to Smith’s Weekly, where he replaced Lennie Lower (died 1947) as humorous writer and remained for four years until it closed in 1950, 'decorating his merry writings with his own curious humorous drawings'. He contributed occasional whimsical cartoons and articles to Australia: National Journal, e.g. May 1947, and to Australia: Week-end Book, Vol. 2 (1943) of the latter has seven cartoons, e.g., couple looking at nudes, satyrs and pirates on beach and saying, “Aren’t those the people we met at Mr. Lindsay’s?”. He illustrated a book for Leon Gellert with simple, whimsical, line drawings.

Out of work in 1950 Hesling did a few recorded talks for the BBC at 30/- a time. He wrote freelance articles for the Sydney Morning Herald at about £8 per 1,000 words, 'and, of course, I did joke drawings. There is a terrific market for these; I remember once Man paying me three guineas for a whole page of them, one of which I later sold to The New Yorker (as an idea) for $40. He drew cartoons and wrote for Nation, Bulletin, Quadrant, Meanjin and The Listener. He wrote light-hearted 'social commentary’ for the Current Affairs Bulletin.

He was art critic for The Observer (Sydney). As critic he was refreshingly cynical about the enthusiasm for abstraction. 'It is, I realise, cheap to say painters knock them off quickly, but it is none the less true that reputable artists who cross the tracks find that, instead of doing ten good small paintings per year, they can now churn out twenty big abstractions, each allegedly as full as an egg with serious perception, human understanding and what-have-you'. Some people took him too seriously:

It was also becoming increasingly difficult for the abstractionists to retain a sense of integrity when the Observer's critic, Bernard Hesling, brought a new low point to Sydney's art discourse by evaluating works according to their price tags and speed of execution. Frank Hodgkinson's Prelude to Conflict and Conflict, he wrote in March 1958: "would not be out of place in an enlightened pub or espresso bar, where the client could make even additional interest by discussing why these two works, which are almost twins, cost 35 guineas and 100 guineas respectively".

=== Hesling and Hughes ===
The Observer's editor Donald Horne fired him in 1958 and replaced him with the young Robert Hughes. Hughes told the story in his 2007 Memoir and described Hesling as 'an elderly immigrant Yorkshireman ... an artist who made his basic living painting garish enamel tea trays’. Hughes understood Hesling was fired because of his critical review of a Blake exhibition he hadn’t seen. But it seems that Horne was desperate to get rid of Hesling because he complained about Horne's low pay and he had a reputation for being 'derriere-garde rather than avant-garde'. There is a postscript to Hughes’ story which Diana Wyndham mentions in Norman Haire and the Study of Sex: in a personal communication Peter Coleman told her he was there and that Hughes’ account was not true: the newspaper proprietor was a friend of the Hughes family and was determined to give Robert a job.

In 1961, after reading Hesling's essay on Dobell in The Bulletin, Hughes fired off a fractious letter to its editor: 'Sir, When I read the article on William Dobell I did not believe that human discourse could sink into such adipose servility. It was one long unperceptive puff, with no attempt at critical reference.'. Art writer Patricia Anderson later wrote: 'In fact Hesling's piece was radiant with perception of the man (if not always his art). It was responsive to the dilemmas of being an artist at that time in Australia and the reader learns something true and lasting about this shy painter. Dobell, suggested Hesling, had won a prize for drawing a still life painting of a banana at the local public school. "Unfortunately, the banana was also the prize, and, as Bill says, it didn't go very far, as he had too many friends to share it with."'

== From murals to enamels ==
Hesling painted numerous murals from 1950 until about 1957 in New South Wales, Victoria, South Australia and North Queensland (Emerald). His first mural was for Qantas' head office, Sydney, and he did more for its overseas offices. Among his clients were Marcus Clark store, ES&A bank and Ambassador Restaurant. He said at the time that 1956 was the most successful year of his life, when he earned £5,000 (average wage then £900) from painting murals in pub lounges that came into existence only when 'six o’clock swill’ was legislated out of existence by reform of hotel licensing hours. That event had an enormous impact on his life, and the extra income financed his swimming pool and his much-loved MG Magnette car.

He took up vitreous enamel painting in 1957 and later wrote 'In the beginning my main interest was in easel painting but, as this is hardly a job for a grown man, I turned to murals and big brush jobs; and then, as I often was asked to quote on exterior murals – and oil paint is no good for this – I read up on vitreous enamel and set about bringing this craft up to date. You’ve probably seen the stuff: tables, saucepans, jugs, kettles …and exterior murals with enamel’. Also, pubs complained that murals became worn and dirty; vitreous-enamel painting lasted indefinitely.

In Art Ruined My Career in Crime he said that: a Sydney department store launched his enamels in 1957; in 1958, 1959 and 1961 he held at David Jones Art Gallery, Sydney, what were probably the world’s first exhibitions of large brush-painted enamelled panels; and that since 1957 he had produced over 4,000 pieces – ashtrays, trays, tables, wall panels etc. He exhibited his work in Sydney, Melbourne, Canberra, Adelaide and Europe.

Bernard and wife Flo’ left their home, White House, The Redoubt, Castlecrag, Sydney, in 1962 and moved to 21 Travers Place, North Adelaide. He was attracted by the Adelaide Festival and easy access to facilities for firing his vitreous enamel paintings on steel plates. Bernard cultivated executives of the Adelaide-based Simpson home-appliance company, who let him bake his enamels with their fridges and stoves (he paid them off in pictures). This gave him the vital entry that no one else had. By the 1970s such white-goods were no longer made from enamelled metal, and this and his advancing age restricted his activities.

At an exhibition of his enamels at Underwood Galleries in Sydney in 1965 Hesling said: 'I have expressed myself in many different ways in order to prove the validity and versatility of vitreous enamel as a painting medium. Painting in enamel is no harder than painting in oils – merely different. Its great advantage as a medium lies in its suitability for exterior mural work and in its durability at all temperatures. It has been suggested that enamel as an art form cannot be entirely controlled. This is nonsense as a glance at the portrait work of any one of the famous enamellers will show.’

His lively designs in vivid colours usually drew favourable comment. But a big exhibition of his plates and panels in Canberra in 1968 did not. Art critic Robin Wallace-Crabbe commented:

In this exhibition he works in a variety of styles…Hesling is obviously capable of handling this medium with skill but he seems to lack the ability to translate witty (though sometimes rather tediously so) ideas into pictures. Apart from the general lack of control in organising his colours and tones and apart from a tendency to be inconsistent in intention within a single work the thing that disturbed me about this show is the failure of the pictures to convey visually the wit of the idea that was their starting point…[etc].

The next day, Hesling was reported as saying that painting should be enjoyed as decorative only and not given complicated meanings and explanations: 'Painting began for decorative purposes – in churches, for example. Only lately has it become a language of its own. I’m sick and tired of serious evaluations of enormous canvasses with stripes on them'.

In 1969 he recorded with Hazel de Berg an entertaining account of his life and family, his varied career and his vitreous enamelling: “I’ve never been very interested in art – I’m interested in me painting – it’s the sort of thing everybody should do” etc.

In 1971, looking back, he wrote

On the eve of drawing the old age pension I find myself more interested in myself painting than in art generally. The world is in a mess. I can do little about this. My painting is in a mess too, but as I can probably do something about this, I escape into it. As a child, Art bored me, but as I drew and sold cartoons at an early age, my parents trundled my stroller into every available gallery. Later in Paris I discovered that all French moderns were wonderful and not like art at all. Back in England I became a futurist, a cubist and finally an out-of-work-ist, painting on the London pavement.

The Sydney Morning Herald in 1971 said that Hesling has often been described as the first man to introduce vitreous enamel work to Australia but he prefers to be known as the man who fostered it here. “There is more vitreous enamel work done by me and my school in Adelaide than in the whole world.”

Hesling had little interest in sport. Donald Bradman’s wife bought for her husband a Hesling painting of a cricket scene that, by oversight, had an extra fielder. Bradman asked Hesling to paint out the extra.

He had a long association with Greenhill Galleries, Adelaide. In 1999, long after his death, Greenhill Galleries offered his 'long lost’ set of four 'Australia Day’ enamel panels for sale at $100,000. They showed the ship Buffalo en route to Australia in 1836, etc. These 1971 panels are reproduced in black and white in his Art Ruined My Career in Crime 1977, pp. 43–45.

=== McCulloch's Encyclopaedia ===
In 1924 Hesling’s friend and art-teacher Joseph Mellor Hanson a won a prize to study art in Paris. Hesling, then a teenager, visited him there for three weeks and met French artists. Years later he wrote:

I had forgotten my Paris period until I read that Alan McCulloch in his Encyclopaedia of Australian Art quotes me as saying “In Paris aged eighteen I was influenced by Le Douanier Henri Rousseau”. I have no doubt I said this but at the time Alan was interviewing me there were art buyers within hearing and as I am quite as interested in the art of selling as in the art of painting, I naturally tied myself to Rousseau (then popular) whereas unbelievably I began as a freak-out modern and only learnt how not to draw when I was over forty.

Hesling has said that the first primitive to influence him was not Rousseau but William Dobell’s father (see above), who painted without training. McCulloch’s encyclopaedia (2006) now says Hesling’s first paintings were similar in style to Rousseau’s naif style. McCulloch also says that: he was born in Yorkshire [Wales]; he worked in Paris [he was there on holidays]; he worked at Elstree Studios, Sydney [London]; he pioneered vitreous enamelling in Australia [he fostered it].

=== The enamelling method ===
Hesling said: 'I do use unusual methods in vitreous enamel painting on metal, but I'm not breaking new ground. At the most there are a dozen people in the world who work on steel and stainless steel and six of them are in Adelaide. Every one of those six has learned from me, but there is nothing really to learn. I just tell people how to prepare it and they do it.' He said that copper plate is unsuitable.

A Hesling catalogue described the method as follows:

Vitreous enamel is almost identical with porcelain glaze, except that it is fired on metal and not on china-clay. It has three forms - Cloisonne, Champleve and Limoge. Bernard Hesling's work is very similar to the technique of Limoge, in that the enamel is painted on and over the entire surface. The word "vitreous" means glass, and these panels etc are painted with coloured ground glass mixed with pine oil in the consistency of thick paint. This remarkable weather and heat resisting surface is not obtained by the use of any over-glaze. It is the glass paint itself which melts when fired in the furnace at 1600°F.

The gold, which is 24 carat, and the genuine platinum used on some of these decorative panels, is similar to that used on the highest quality porcelain. Vitreous enamel, which is no relation to household enamel, is almost as old as the Ceramic Arts, but only since the invention of modern furnaces has it been possible to fire large objects and ferrous metals.

Apart from Le Corbusier in France, and the enamellers Edward Winter and K. Bates of the USA, Bernard Hesling has not heard of any other professional artist outside Australia who has ever painted large sheets of steel, exactly as though it were canvas, and fired the result (as all these panels were fired) alongside enamel baths and cooking stoves, in a huge modern furnace.

His book Art Ruined My Career in Crime 1977 set out more information on his enamelling method and has many colour illustrations of his artwork.

== Author ==
In 1945 Consolidated Press, Sydney, published Hesling's Cartoons: Reprinted from the Daily Telegraph and Sunday Telegraph (96pp).

His first book, an illustrated account of Sydney, Sydney Observed (S.A.Photo-Litho Pty Ltd 1953), was described as a book of 'gentle mockery and wry delight’. It was followed by several humorous illustrated autobiographies that told of his Yorkshire childhood, working in London and his later life in Sydney and Adelaide:

- Little and Orphan Constable, London, 1954 (repub by Ure Smith 1967), which A. D. Hope said 'tapped a vein of pure and natural comedy... It is one of the most engaging books I have read for a long time’. (In Little and Orphan Bernard’s brother Charles is "Holroyd" and his brother James is "Ben".)
- The Dinkumization and Depommification of an Artful English Immigrant Ure Smith 1963 (repub. as The Dinkum Pommie 1964), which Clement Semmler said contained 'the essence of Mr Hesling’s philosophy and observation of his adopted country and countrymen: “Today nobody starves (nobody white). This being so, anyone can paint, write poems or play the fiddle just for the hell of it…”’.
- Stir Up This Stew Ure Smith 1966, praised by Olaf Ruhen.
- My Picture Book. My Life and Art Times. 25 Colour Plates. My Enamels, self-published 1971.
- I Left My Tears in the Fridge, self-published 1972, praised by Clement Semmler: 'the Hesling comic vision is based on shrewd observation’.
- Around the World on an Old Age Pension 1974 (which includes My Picture Book), praised by Clement Semmler.
- Art Ruined My Career in Crime self-published 1977. See above.

== Playwright and performer ==
In his youth in London he sought to be an actor but came to dislike acting because he couldn't remember his lines. In Sydney in 1965, helped by an actor friend who had won the Opera House Lottery, Hesling, with a cast of actors, performed his play My Life, with an Interval for Asperin (sic). In the 1970s, in Adelaide, Canberra etc, it was a one-man stage performance, as was his Bear with Hesling or My Life and Art Times (1977). Among the press notices Stephen Murray-Smith said 'Bernard Hesling is one of the funniest men in Australia and his stories are famous amongst the few who have been privileged to hear them. He did not give us stories, though, but his life – we’re still laughing – and or crying’. In the Hazel de Berg recording cited above he gave background information on his stage productions.

== Order of Australia Medal ==
Hesling was awarded an Order of Australia Medal in June 1985. The citation read: “For contributions to the visual, performing and literary arts. Pioneered in Australia the use of vitreous enamels. Published a number of books illustrated with his own paintings and drawings. His cartoons and writings have also appeared in various newspapers.”

The Advertiser noted the OAM and described Bernard’s varied life in its Monday Profile article “A colorful 80 years, and still making his mark”. Chris Butler’s article “Bernard Hesling: A self-confessed amateur nut-case”, was a one-page biography.

== Personal life ==
The Heslings were a Yorkshire family temporarily in Wales when Bernard was born on 8 June 1905, fourth child of Walter Hesling, woolbuyer, and his wife Louise Ruth (Pickles). In 1907 his father died and the family moved back to Yorkshire and settled at 37 Ripon street, Halifax. His mother’s father was Bradford alderman William Pickles. The Heslings and the Pickles were Methodists until, when Bernard was about 12, his mother took to Christian Science. Bernard had two older brothers: Charles (see above) (also Christian Science) and James, who became a Christian Science prison chaplain. He had an older sister, Hannah. Bernard had no religious beliefs and was left-wing in political views.

Bernard married Flo (Florence May Pickles), aged 20, in 1933 in London. She was from a Yorkshire family (not related to Bernard’s mother) who lived in Montana USA until she was 12. Flo suffered from severe arthritis in the 1950s and 1960s, and Bernard was very attentive to her. Flo's elderly mother Mrs Pickles came from USA to live with Bernard and Flo in the 1950s, each woman thinking that the other would look after her in her poor state of health! Flo died on 21 May 1970. There were no children.

At Castlecrag Bernard was friendly with fellow-residents such as alderman Edgar Deans, music patron Charles Berg, poet A D Hope, artist Edmund Harvey, sculptors Anita Aarons and Bim Hilder, lawyer Edward St John, marxist Guido Baracchi and architect Hugh Buhrich.

It is likely that Bernard became an Australian citizen on 26 January 1949 under the Australian Citizenship Act 1948 as a British subject resident in Australia for the previous five years.

In 1957 Bernard sponsored historian Dr D Roger Hainsworth (born Yorkshire 1931), son of his first-cousin artist Lilian (Pickles) Hainsworth, as an assisted migrant to Australia. A graduate of New College, Oxford, Dr Hainsworth taught at Adelaide University from 1965 until retirement in 1993.

In his last years Hesling lived at the Helping Hand Centre, Adelaide. He died aged 82 on 13 June 1987. He bequeathed his body to the Faculty of Medicine in Adelaide, having told his friends that he always wanted to go to university. Tim Lloyd’s obituary is available at Obituaries Australia.

== Assessment ==
Bernard Hesling is best remembered for his vitreous-enamel plates and wall panels. Examples of his art are held in the Art Gallery of Western Australia, Hamilton Art Gallery, National Gallery of Australia and Art Gallery of South Australia. His style sits between a kind of modern decorativeness and mid-century expressionism. His work is technically very proficient in a medium that few Australians have mastered and his imagery is that of a mature artist, fully resolved and coherent within its own style. His output in the 1960s and 1970s was prolific but each of his artworks was individual and all were vivid and bold. Like his paintings, books, articles, plays and performances, his artwork reflected his extrovert nature and lively imagination. He was a cheerful, witty conversationalist and story-teller who enjoyed publicity and promoted himself as a bon vivant and eccentric artist. He had little formal education and training but he was talented and energetic. His confidence as an entrepreneur and his confessed 'armour-plated ego’ helped him achieve much and he led a happy life in his adopted country.

Thirty-one years after his death he was remembered fondly by journalist Shirley Stott Despoja.
