= Vivian Gordon Bowden =

Australian public servant

Vivian Gordon Bowden CBE
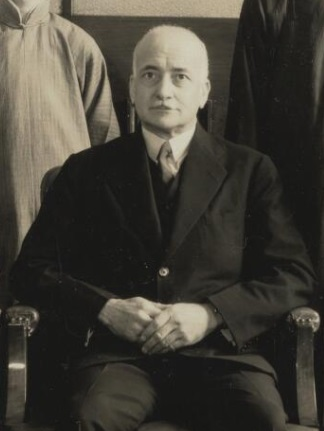
- Bowden as Trade Commissioner in Shanghai, May 1937.
- Born: 28 May 1884; Stanmore, Colony of New South Wales
- Died: 17 February 1942 (aged 57); Muntok, Bangka Island, Dutch East Indies
- Cause of death: Execution by shooting
- Education: Shore School; Bedford Grammar School
- Occupations: Public servant, diplomat
- Spouse: Dorothy Dennis (m. 1917)
- Children: Ivor Gordon Bowden

Vivian Gordon Bowden CBE (28 May 1884 – 17 February 1942) was an Australian public servant and diplomat.

== Early life and career ==
Bowden was born on 28 May 1884 in Stanmore in the Colony of New South Wales, the son of merchant Vivian Rothwell Bowden and Mary Ann Harrison Cazaly. First educated at Sydney Church of England Grammar School, Bowden was sent to England to board at Bedford Grammar School. Upon leaving school, Bowden travelled to Europe to study the silk industry at the Technische Hochschule Darmstadt and spent two years in France undergoing training as a raw silk inspector, subsequently finding employment as a silk inspector at Canton and Tokyo. In 1908 he joined Bowden Bros & Co. Ltd., the mercantile house his father had established, in the raw produce export department in Yokohama.

Back in England, on the outbreak of war Bowden was commissioned in the British Army Service Corps on 4 February 1915. On 3 July 1915 he married Dorothy Dennis at the Savoy Chapel in London. In January 1917 he transferred to the Royal Engineers and towards the end of the war was appointed assistant director of railways and docks in Cherbourg and promoted temporary major in May 1918. After being demobilised on 21 March 1919, Bowden eventually returned to Japan, working in the export business and in 1921 was appointed managing director of A. Cameron and Co. (China), Ltd., in Shanghai, an import firm for which he worked until 1935, when he was obliged to resign to take up the position of Trade Commissioner. While in Shanghai, Bowden initially lived in a house in the French Concession, before moving to a flat in the International Settlement during the great depression, and then back to a house in the French Concession once economic conditions improved. One son, Ivor Gordon Bowden, was born in Shanghai in 1925.

== Trade Commissioner in Shanghai ==
On 30 August 1933 the Minister for Commerce, Frederick Stewart, secured Cabinet approval for the establishment of several Trade Commissions in the East, with Shanghai, Batavia and Hong Kong being the most likely locations. Following the report of Attorney General and Minister for External Affairs John Latham's fact-finding mission to the Far East, which found a dire need for an Australian trade representative to improve mercantile connections in the region, the government agreed to appoint several new Trade Commissioners, and Bowden's appointment to Shanghai, alongside separate appointments to Tokyo and Batavia, being announced on 7 June 1935 by acting Prime Minister Earl Page.

With the outbreak of the Second Sino-Japanese War in July 1937 and the Battle of Shanghai in August 1937, it was decided that Bowden remain in the city (the Trade Commission was located in the HSBC Building, within the relatively safe International Settlement) to keep the government informed on developments in the conflict and to work on "measures for the protection of Australian lives and property". For his work in Shanghai, Bowden was appointed as Commander of the Order of the British Empire (CBE), in the 1941 New Year Honours.

Bowden served in Shanghai until September 1941 when he was appointed Official Representative of the Commonwealth Government in Singapore. It was also confirmed at the same time that Bowden would not be replaced in Shanghai, with all trade and commerce matters now the responsibility of the new Australian Legation in Chungking headed by Minister Sir Frederic Eggleston. On Bowden's time in Shanghai, historian of the Australian Trade Commissioner Service Boris Schevdin noted:

"It would be difficult to argue that Bowden had established his office as an engine of China–Australia trade growth in the six years that he occupied the position; however, in the disrupted circumstances of China at the time, it would have been beyond the capacity of any mortal to have accomplished more. By diligence and intelligence, and extensive Chinese experience, Bowden—together with [Trade Commissioner in Batavia] Critchley and [Trade Commissioner in Tokyo] Longfield Lloyd—established the necessity of direct Australian representation in Asia."

== Official Representative, Singapore ==
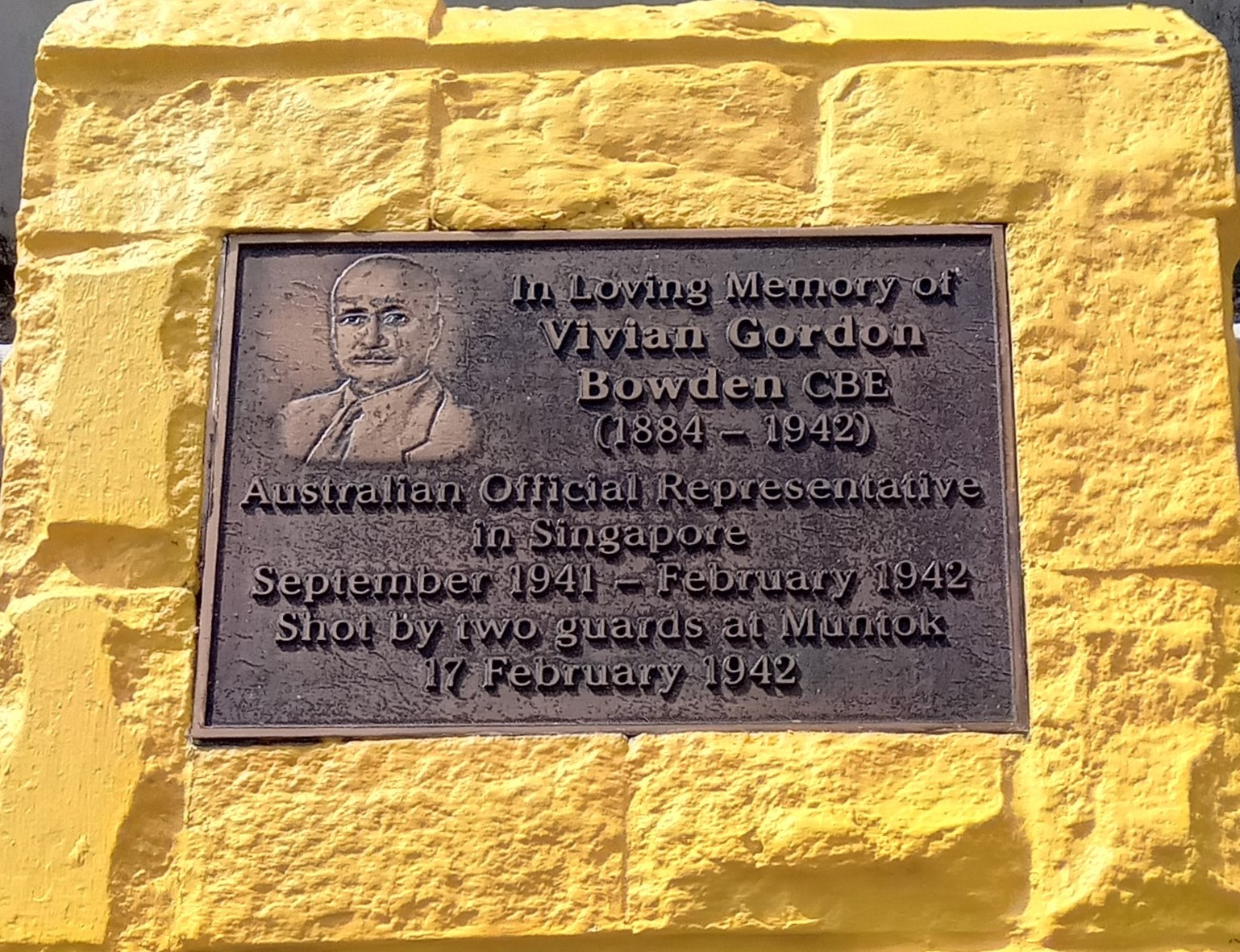
Vivian Gordon Bowden Monument in Mentok Harbor, Bangka Island

On 1 September 1941 the now Minister for External Affairs, Frederick Stewart, announced Bowden's appointment as Australia's Official Representative at Singapore, the capital of the British Straits Settlements, with the aim of being the official intermediary between the Commonwealth Government and the British authorities. Bowden was supported by a Commercial Secretary, Alfred Wootton, and a Third Secretary, John Quinn. In October 1941, Bowden was invested with his CBE by the Governor of the Straits Settlements, Sir Shenton Thomas, at Government House.

On 14 February 1942, the day before the fall of Singapore, Bowden, Wootton and Quinn escaped the city on the insistence of commander Arthur Percival, and attempted a return to Australia on board the 40-foot launch, the Mary Rose under the command of Captain George Mulock. Bowden relayed a final message to Australia before embarking: "Our work completed. We will telegraph from another place at present unknown".

However, the Mary Rose was captured at sea on 17 February by Japanese patrol boats and escorted into Muntok harbour, on Bangka Island in the Dutch East Indies, the day after the Bangka Island massacre had been perpetrated by Japanese forces against unarmed Australian nurses and Australian forces. While held captive in a cinema in Muntok, Bowden attempted to communicate to his captors in Japanese of his diplomatic status and fought attempts by soldiers to take some of his personal possessions. Soldiers beat him and took him outside, where a witness later recalled seeing "an elderly white-haired gentleman" forced to dig a shallow grave and stand at its edge before being shot.

Bowden and his service in Singapore was later summed up by DVA historians Dr John Moremon and Dr Richard Reid, as one who "deserves to be remembered as one who 'stuck to his post' and as the only Australian diplomat executed in the line of duty." In November 2011 a memorial plaque to Bowden was placed near the Muntok Cinema where he was killed. The plaque was unveiled by his son, former Australian ambassador to Iran and Pakistan, Ivor Gordon Bowden, and Agus Tarmidzi, a former Indonesian Ambassador to The Hague and United Nations. In 2018, in his honour the Australian Embassy in Jakarta established the "Vivian Gordon Bowden Education Prize", awarded annually to two education students at the University of Bangka Belitung.

== Honours ==
- 1914–15 Star, British War Medal, Victory Medal, 1919.
- Commander of the Order of the British Empire (CBE), 1941 New Year Honours.

Diplomatic posts
Vacant Title last held by Edward S. Little	Australian Trade Commissioner in Shanghai; 1935–1941	Vacant Title next held by Alfred Wootton
Vacant Title last held by Egbert Sheaf as Trade Commissioner	Australian Official Representative in Singapore; 1941–1942	Vacant Title next held by Claude Massey as Commissioner
