= List of high commissioners of Australia to Brunei =

High Commissioner of Australia to Brunei Darussalam

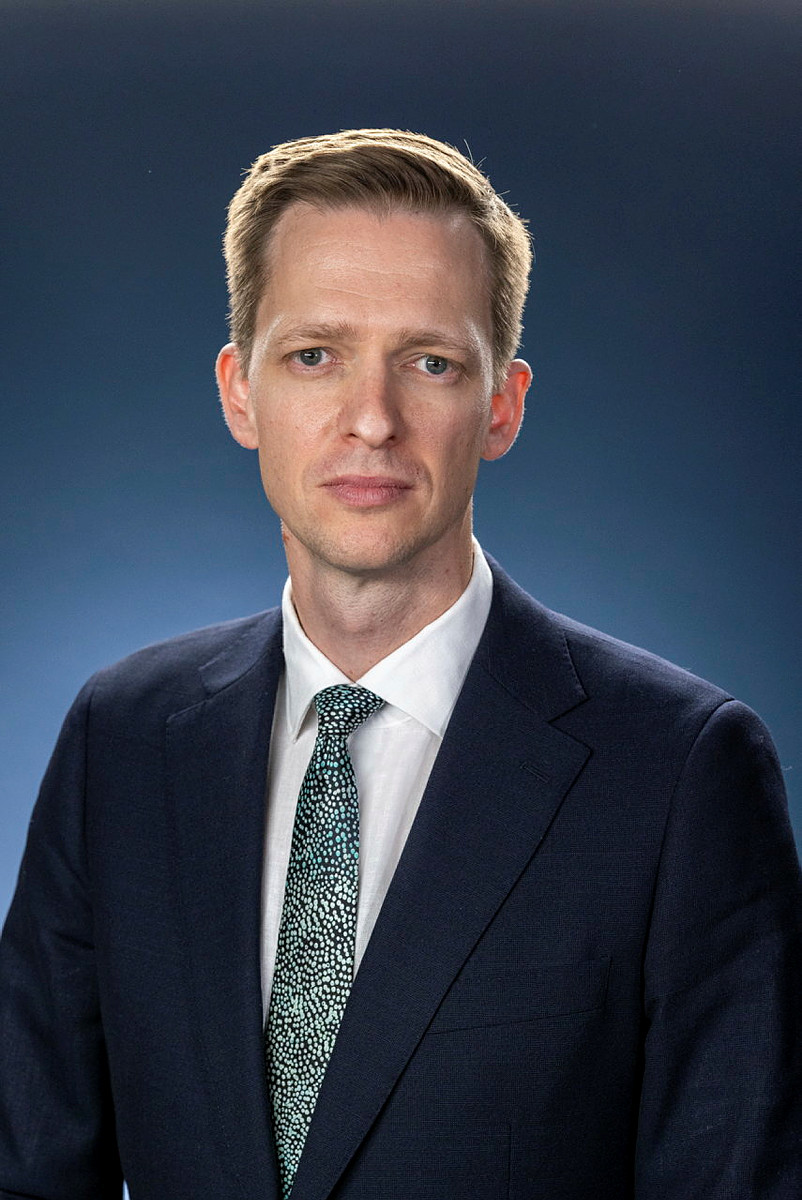
- Incumbent; Michael Hoy since 23 December 2024
- Department of Foreign Affairs and Trade
- Style: His Excellency
- Reports to: Minister for Foreign Affairs
- Residence: Bandar Seri Begawan
- Nominator: Prime Minister of Australia
- Appointer: Governor General of Australia
- Inaugural holder: Graham Feakes (Commissioner)
- Formation: 30 July 1979
- Website: Australian High Commission, Brunei Darussalam

The high commissioner of Australia to Brunei is an officer of the Australian Department of Foreign Affairs and Trade and the head of the High Commission of the Commonwealth of Australia in Brunei. The position has the rank and status of an ambassador extraordinary and plenipotentiary and is currently held by Luke Arnold since January 2022. There has been a resident Australian high commissioner in Brunei since March 1983.

== Posting history ==
The reporting responsibility for the British Protectorate of Brunei was originally held by the Australian office in Singapore, with a "Commissioner for Malaya and South-East Asia" appointed in 1946. On 7 April 1956, Ralph Harry took up his appointment in Singapore as the Australian Commissioner for Singapore, Brunei, Sarawak, and North Borneo. With the formation of the Federation of Malaysia on 16 September 1963, the Australian Commission in Singapore became a subordinate Deputy High Commission to the new High Commission in Kuala Lumpur, and responsibility for Brunei, which remained a British protectorate outside of Malaysia, was transferred to the high commission.

On 30 July 1979, the Australian high commissioner to Malaysia in Kuala Lumpur, was appointed as the non-resident Commissioner to Brunei, with a stated purpose to "facilitate contacts and closer cooperation with the Government of Brunei during the period leading up to Brunei's full independence in 1983". A resident Australian Commission in Brunei was established in March 1983 headed by John Monfries, in anticipation of Brunei's independence on 1 January 1984. When Brunei gained its independence, the Australian mission became a High Commission.

== Heads of mission ==
#	Officeholder	Title	Residency	Term start date	Term end date	Time in office	Notes
1	Graham Feakes	Commissioner	Kuala Lumpur, Malaysia	30 July 1979	April 1980	8 months	
2	Garry Woodard	Commissioner	Kuala Lumpur, Malaysia	April 1980	March 1983	2 years, 11 months	
3	John Monfries	Commissioner	Bandar Seri Begawan	March 1983	31 December 1983	9 months	
4	John Starey	High Commissioner	Bandar Seri Begawan	1 January 1984	August 1988	4 years, 7 months	
5	Philip Knight	High Commissioner	Bandar Seri Begawan	August 1988	June 1992	3 years, 10 months	
6	Frank Milne	High Commissioner	Bandar Seri Begawan	June 1992	September 1995	3 years, 3 months	
7	Neal Davis	High Commissioner	Bandar Seri Begawan	September 1995	October 1999	4 years, 1 month	
8	Doug Chester	High Commissioner	Bandar Seri Begawan	October 1999	January 2001	1 year, 3 months	
9	Allaster Cox	High Commissioner	Bandar Seri Begawan	January 2001	February 2004	3 years, 1 month	
10	Christian Bennett	High Commissioner	Bandar Seri Begawan	February 2004	February 2006	2 years	
11	Ruth Adler	High Commissioner	Bandar Seri Begawan	February 2006	February 2009	3 years	
12	Mark Sawers	High Commissioner	Bandar Seri Begawan	February 2009	August 2012	3 years, 6 months	
13	Todd Mercer	High Commissioner	Bandar Seri Begawan	August 2012	August 2016	4 years	
14	Nicola Rosenblum	High Commissioner	Bandar Seri Begawan	August 2016	October 2020	4 years, 2 months	
15	Tiffany McDonald	High Commissioner	Bandar Seri Begawan	October 2020	December 2021	1 year, 2 months	
16	Luke Arnold	High Commissioner	Bandar Seri Begawan	31 January 2022	Incumbent	4 years, 312 days	
