= UBB =

UBB or Ubb may refer to:

== Education ==
- Babeș-Bolyai University in Cluj-Napoca, Romania
- University of Bangka Belitung in Pangkalpinang, Indonesia
- University of Bío Bío in Chile

== Media ==
- Ultimate Big Brother, British reality television show
- Ultimate Breaks and Beats, a series of compilation albums
- Usage Based Billing (UBB), a Canadian Radio-television and Telecommunications Commission regulation allowing Internet service providers to charge customers per gigabyte transferred

== Science and technology ==
- BBCode text documents formatting ( '[b]bold[/b]' etc.)
- Ubiquitin B gene
- Unbibium, symbol Ubb for '122', a theoretical chemical element

== Other uses ==
- Union Bordeaux Bègles, a French rugby union team
- United Bulgarian Bank
- Usedomer Bäderbahn, a German regional railway serving the spa towns on the German and Polish island of Usedom
- Mabuiag Island Airport, IATA airport code "UBB"
