= Penny Williams (diplomat) =

Australian public servant and diplomat

Penny Williams PSM
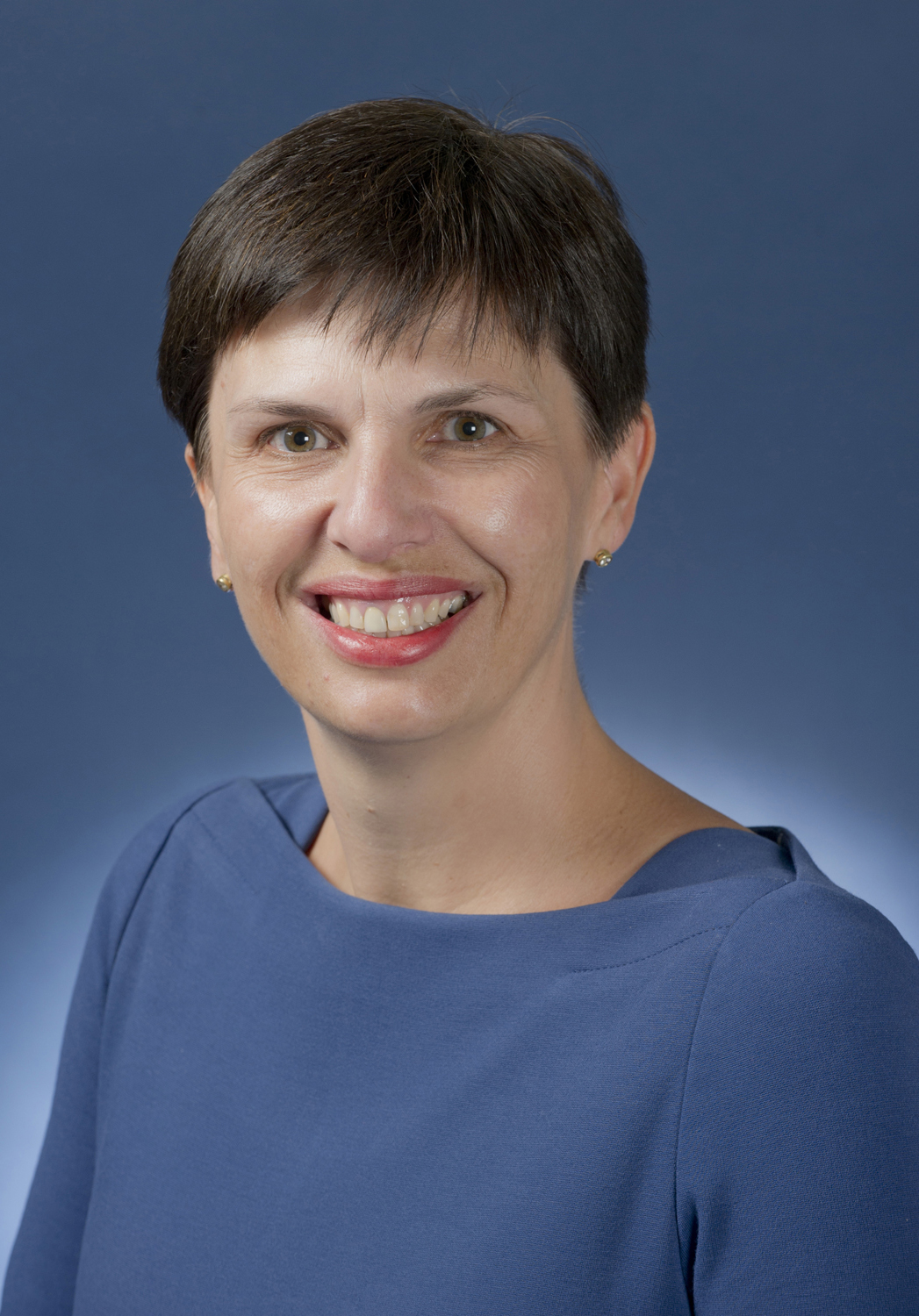

Ambassador of Australia to Indonesia
- In office 1 September 2021 – 23 December 2024
- Prime Minister: Scott Morrison; Anthony Albanese
- Preceded by: Gary Quinlan
- Succeeded by: Rod Brazier

Ambassador of Australia for Women and Girls
- In office 13 September 2011 – 16 December 2013
- Prime Minister: Julia Gillard; Kevin Rudd; Tony Abbott
- Preceded by: Position created
- Succeeded by: Natasha Stott Despoja

High Commissioner of Australia to Malaysia
- In office 1 March 2007 – 5 May 2010
- Prime Minister: John Howard; Kevin Rudd
- Preceded by: James Wise
- Succeeded by: Miles Kupa

Personal details
- Born: 22 January 1964 (age 62) Tasmania, Australia
- Children: 4
- Education: Australian National University
- Occupation: Public servant and diplomat

Penny Williams PSM (born in Wynyard, Tasmania, 22 January 1964) is an Australian public servant and diplomat. She is former Australian Ambassador to Indonesia (2021–24). From 2007 to 2010, Williams was Australian High Commissioner to Malaysia.

== Life and career ==
Born in Tasmania, Williams' mother was a teacher. Penny Williams joined the Department of Foreign Affairs and Trade (DFAT) in 1988 as a graduate of the Australian National University with a Bachelor of Arts in Asian studies and a Masters of applied anthropology and participatory democracy. Earlier, before becoming a student at ANU, in 1981–82 she had spent time in Indonesia as an exchange student at the Sekolah Menengah Atas (SMA) 1 PSKD school (Perkumpulan Sekolah Kristen Djakarta Senior High School No 1) near the University of Indonesia in Salemba in Central Jakarta.

=== Diplomatic career ===
After joining DFAT, Williams had postings to Damascus, Syria (1992–1994) and to Santiago, Chile (1997–2000).

Williams represented Australia as High Commissioner to Malaysia from 2007 to 2010, her first ambassadorial posting. From 2011 to 2013 she was Australia's Global Ambassador for Women and Girls, the first appointee to that position. As Ambassador for Women and Girls, Williams advocated to end domestic violence, empower women and increase representation of women in leadership roles globally. Her first overseas visit as Ambassador for Women and Girls to Southeast Asia in 2012 included a visit to Indonesia. She was also often invited to make public appearances, including on the media, to discuss women's issues. Williams was later appointed a Deputy Secretary in DFAT in February 2017, first in charge of the International Security, Humanitarian and Consular Group, and after April 2018 with responsibilities for the Services Delivery Group in the Department.

Williams was awarded a Public Service Medal in 2015 for "outstanding public service in the role of Australia's inaugural Global Ambassador for Women and Girls".

In April 2021, Williams was appointed Australian ambassador designate to Indonesia replacing Gary Quinlan who had been Australian ambassador in Jakarta since February 2018. She presented credentials to President Joko Widodo on 1 September 2021. She is the first Australian woman ambassador to Indonesia and the first Australian ambassador to Indonesia to be fluent in Indonesian.

Diplomatic posts
Preceded by James Wise	Australian high commissioner to Malaysia; 2007–2010	Succeeded by Miles Kupa
New title	Ambassador of Australia for Women and Girls; 2011–2013	Succeeded by Natasha Stott Despoja
Preceded by Gary Quinlan	Australian Ambassador to Indonesia; 2021–2024	Succeeded by Rod Brazier
