= Gary Quinlan =

Australian diplomat and public servant

His Excellency Gary Quinlan AO
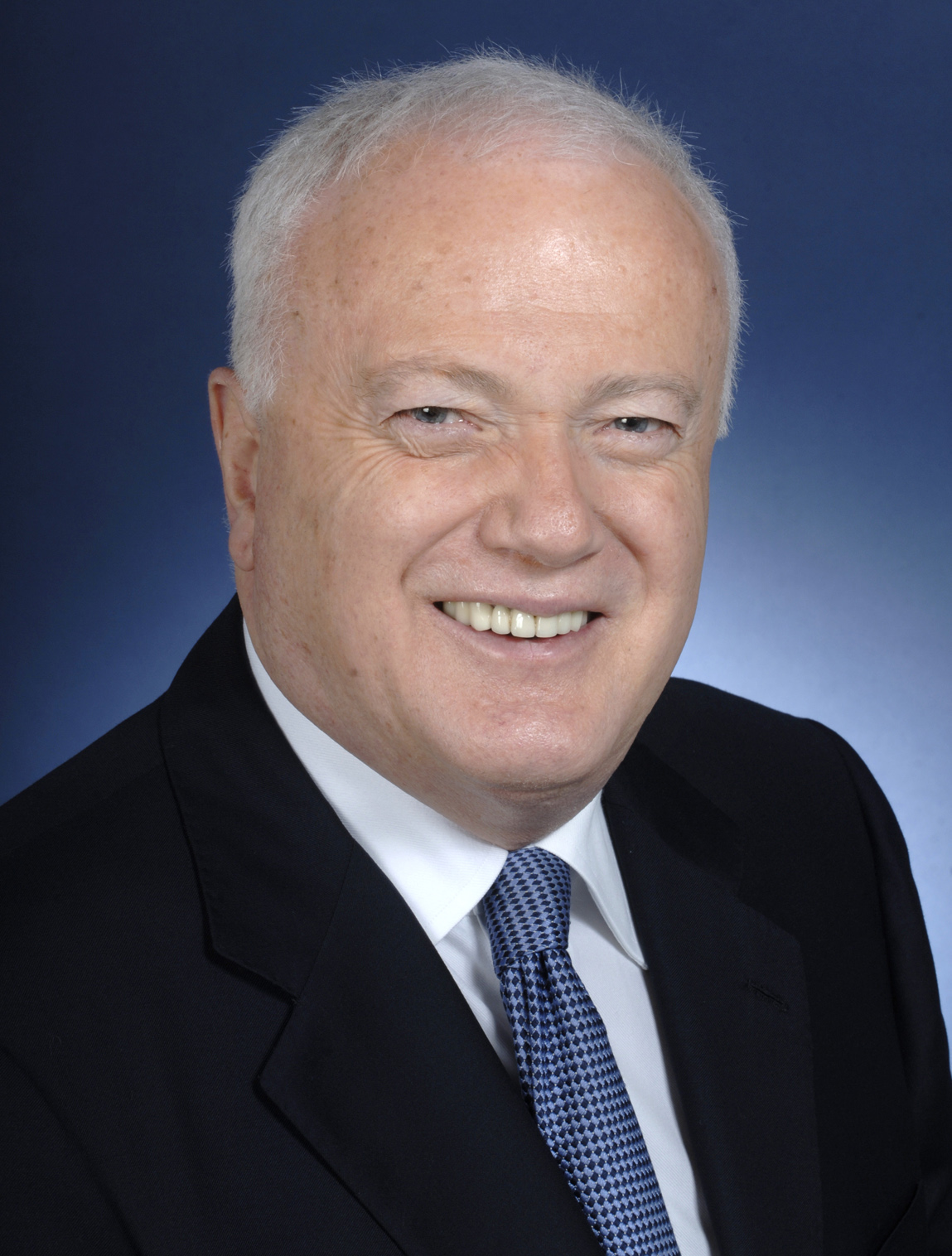

Australian Ambassador to Indonesia
- In office 27 February 2018 – 14 April 2021
- Preceded by: Paul Grigson
- Succeeded by: Penny Williams

Permanent Representative of Australia to the United Nations
- In office 25 February 2009 – January 2015
- Preceded by: Robert Hill
- Succeeded by: Gillian Bird

Australian High Commissioner to Singapore
- In office 6 March 2001 – 15 June 2005
- Preceded by: Murray McLean
- Succeeded by: Miles Kupa

Personal details
- Born: 11 March 1951 (age 75)
- Education: University of Newcastle

Gary Francis Quinlan AO (born 11 March 1951) is an Australian diplomat and public servant, who served as the Australian Ambassador to Indonesia from 2018 to 2021. He has previously served as High Commissioner to Singapore and as the Permanent Representative of Australia to the United Nations, including two terms as President of the United Nations Security Council.

== Early life ==
Born on 9 February 1951, Quinlan was educated at the University of Newcastle and graduated in 1972 with a Bachelor of Arts degree in history with honours.

== Diplomatic career ==
Quinlan joined the then Department of Foreign Affairs in 1973 and served in several senior positions in the Department in Canberra including First Assistant Secretary, Consular, Public Diplomacy and Parliamentary Affairs Division (2007) and First Assistant Secretary, Americas and Europe Division (2000–01). He was Head of the Australian Delegation to the Law of the Sea Preparatory Commission from 1987 until 1988.

Quinlan's overseas assignments have been as Second Secretary in Dublin (1974–77), First Secretary, Australian Mission to the United Nations, New York (1981–85), Australian Deputy Permanent Delegate to UNESCO, Paris (1979–81) and was attached to the Economic Development Institute, World Bank in Washington D.C. (1984). Quinlan served as Chief of Staff to the Minister for Trade (1993–94) and Minister for Industry, Science and Technology (1994–96), Peter Cook, and more recently served as Deputy Head of Mission, Australian Embassy Washington DC (2005–07) and High Commissioner to Singapore (2001–05).

From 2007, until his appointment as Ambassador and Permanent Representative to the United Nations in 2009, Quinlan was the Senior Advisor to the Prime Minister on Foreign Affairs, Defence, and National Security.

Following his return from the United Nations in New York in 2014, Quinlan became Deputy Secretary of the Department of Foreign Affairs and Trade and was tasked with the role of Australia's chief negotiator with Timor-Leste over the East Timor maritime boundary dispute. The two parties reached an amicable agreement in February 2018, immediately before Quinlan was appointed as Australia's Ambassador to Indonesia.

== Honours ==
Quinlan holds the honorary degree of Doctor of Letters (Hon DLitt, 2007) from the University of Newcastle. In the 2016 Queen's Birthday Honours he was made an Officer of the Order of Australia (AO) for "distinguished service to public administration in the field of international relations as a senior diplomat and ambassador, and as an advisor to government on foreign policy."

Diplomatic posts
Preceded by Murray McLean	Australian High Commissioner to Singapore; 2001–2005	Succeeded by Miles Kupa
Preceded by Robert Hill	Permanent Representative of Australia to the United Nations; 2009–2015	Succeeded by Gillian Bird
Preceded by María Perceval	President of the United Nations Security Council; September 2013	Succeeded by Agshin Mehdiyev
Preceded by María Perceval	President of the United Nations Security Council; November 2014	Succeeded by Mahamat Zene Cherif
Preceded by Paul Grigson	Australian Ambassador to Indonesia; 2018-2021	Succeeded by Penny Williams
