= List of ambassadors of Australia to Mongolia =

Ambassador of Australia to Mongolia

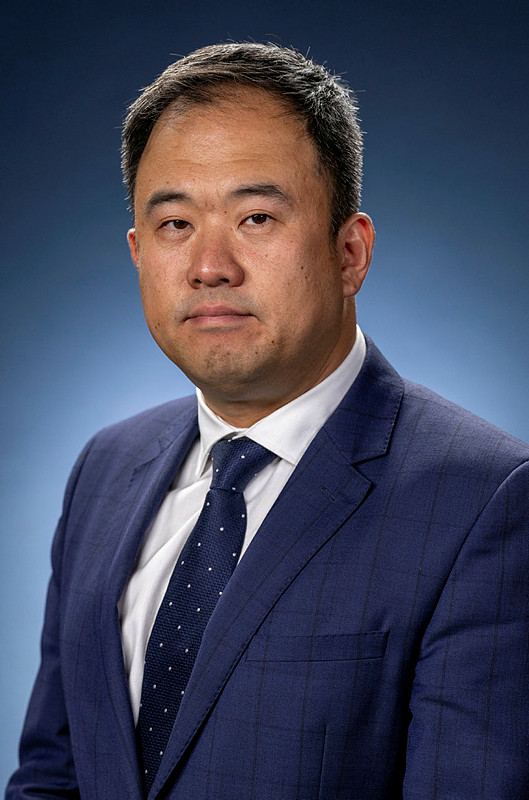
- Incumbent; Leo Zeng since 9 April 2025
- Department of Foreign Affairs and Trade
- Style: His Excellency
- Reports to: Minister for Foreign Affairs
- Nominator: Prime Minister of Australia
- Appointer: Governor General of Australia
- Inaugural holder: Lawrence John Lawrey (resident in Moscow)
- Formation: 5 June 1962

The Ambassador of Australia to Mongolia is an officer of the Australian Department of Foreign Affairs and Trade and the head of the Embassy of the Commonwealth of Australia to Mongolia. The Ambassador resides in Ulaanbaatar. In 2008, Australia moved its diplomatic accreditation to Mongolia from Beijing to Seoul. Australia's first resident Ambassador to Mongolia, John Langtry, was appointed in December 2015. Australia appointed an Honorary Consul in Ulaanbaatar in 2007, and in 2011 an office of Austrade opened in Ulaanbaatar. That office was upgraded to an Australian Consulate-General which opened on 30 March 2012.

== List of officeholders ==
=== Heads of mission ===
Ordinal	Officeholder	Residency	Term start date	Term end date	Time in office	Notes
1	Lawrence John Lawrey	Moscow, Soviet Union	12 June 1972	April 1974	1 year, 9 months	
2	James Plimsoll	Moscow, Soviet Union	23 April 1974	4 August 1977	3 years, 103 days	
3	Murray Bourchier	Moscow, Soviet Union	4 August 1977	August 1980	2 years, 11 months	
4	David Wyke Evans	Moscow, Soviet Union	1 March 1981	March 1984	3 years	
5	Ted Pocock	Moscow, Soviet Union	21 March 1984	September 1987	3 years, 5 months	
6	Robin Ashwin	Moscow, Soviet Union	28 September 1987	May 1991	3 years, 7 months	
7	Cavan Hogue	Moscow, Soviet Union	29 May 1991	26 December 1991	211 days	
8	Michael Lightowler	Beijing, China	1991	1996	4–5 years	
9	Ric Smith	Beijing, China	1996	2000	3–4 years	
10	David Irvine	Beijing, China	2000	2003	2–3 years	
11	Alan Thomas	Beijing, China	2003	2007	3–4 years	
12	Geoff Raby	Beijing, China	2007	August 2008	0–1 years	
13	Peter Brock Rowe	Seoul, South Korea	August 2008	February 2009	6 months	
14	Sam Gerovich	Seoul, South Korea	March 2009	16 March 2013	4 years	
15	Bill Paterson	Seoul, South Korea	16 March 2013	December 2015	2 years, 8 months	
16	John Langtry	Ulaanbaatar, Mongolia	December 2015	January 2019	3 years, 1 month	
17	Dave Vosen	Ulaanbaatar, Mongolia	January 2019	August 2021	2 years, 7 months	
(n/a)	Neil Sanderson (Chargé d’affaires)	Ulaanbaatar, Mongolia	August 2021	6 July 2022	11 months	
18	Katie Smith	Ulaanbaatar, Mongolia	6 July 2022	9 April 2025	2 years, 277 days	
19	Leo Zeng	Ulaanbaatar, Mongolia	9 April 2025	incumbent	1 year, 151 days	

=== Consul-General and Trade Commissioners ===
Name	Start of term	End of term	References
Jargalant Elbegsaikhan (Honorary Consul)	June 2007	April 2011	
David Lawson	April 2011	February 2013	
Tony Burchill	February 2013	May 2015	
Brendan Coyne	May 2015	December 2015	

== See also ==
- Foreign relations of Australia
- Foreign relations of Mongolia
