= Paul Grigson =

Australian diplomat and public servant

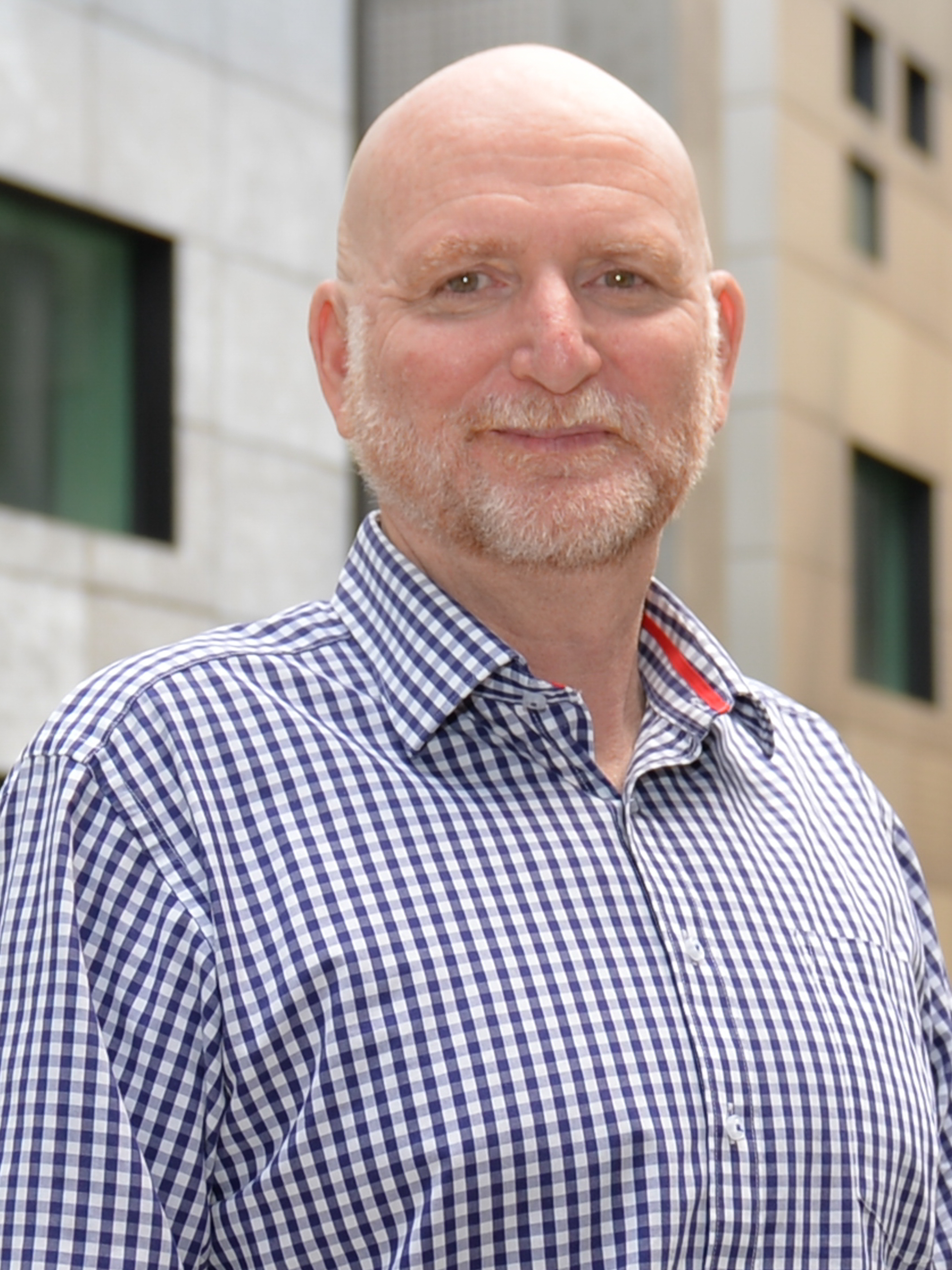

Australian Ambassador to Indonesia
- In office January 2015 – 27 February 2018
- Preceded by: Greg Moriarty
- Succeeded by: Gary Quinlan

Australian Ambassador to Thailand
- In office 17 July 2008 – 21 August 2010
- Preceded by: William Paterson
- Succeeded by: James Wise

Australian Ambassador to Burma
- In office 25 June 2003 – 7 August 2004
- Preceded by: Trevor Wilson
- Succeeded by: Bob Davis

Paul Grigson is an Australian diplomat and public servant. He is currently the deputy secretary of Infrastructure, Transport Security and Customs Group and the deputy comptroller-general of customs. He has served as the Australian ambassador to Indonesia, Thailand and Myanmar.

== Early life ==
Grigson graduated with a B.A. from the University of Queensland, where he studied psychology and journalism. He also holds a B.Litt from Australian National University and a graduate diploma in applied finance from the Securities Institute of Australia (today FINSIA).

== Career ==
Grigson was a journalist at the Australian Associated Press.

In 1991, Grigson became a Media Liaison Officer at the Australian Department of Foreign Affairs and Trade (DFAT), and was appointed as adviser the following year before taking up a position as director of the Parliamentary Liaison and Freedom of Information Section, which he held until 1993. He was then assigned to the Australian Embassy in Phnom Penh, where he worked between 1993 and 1995, becoming its deputy head of mission. Between March and June 2000, he was the Chief Negotiator of the Peace Monitoring Group on Bougainville, before returning to Phnom Penh as chargé d'affaires between July and October that year.

In March 2003, Grigson was appointed as the Australian Ambassador to Burma, replacing Trevor Wilson starting June 2003. He was replaced by Bob Davis in 2005. Between 2004 and 2007, Grigson was also First Assistant Secretary for the Southeast Asia division in DFAT, and then Chief of Staff to the Minister of Foreign Affairs in 2007–2008. He again was appointed Australian Ambassador to Thailand in July 2008, replacing William Paterson. He was replaced by James Wise, who took office in August 2010.

After his time at the Bangkok embassy, Grigson became Deputy Secretary of the DFAT, and he later became Australia's Special Representative to Pakistan and Afghanistan. He left his Deputy Secretary post after being appointed as the Australian Ambassador to Indonesia, a position he took up early 2015. Grigson was recalled on 29 April 2015 following heightened tensions between Indonesia and Australia caused by the execution of Australian drug couriers Andrew Chan and Myuran Sukumaran. After 40 days, Grigson returned to Jakarta on 10 June. Gary Quinlan was appointed to replace Grigson as Ambassador to Indonesia on 27 February 2018.

Grigson started working as the Deputy Secretary of Infrastructure, Transport Security and Customs of the Department of Home Affairs on 19 February 2018. In addition, he also became Deputy Comptroller-General of Customs.

Diplomatic posts
Preceded by Greg Moriarty	Australian Ambassador to Indonesia; 2015–2018	Succeeded by Gary Quinlan
Preceded by William Paterson	Australian Ambassador to Thailand; 2008–2010	Succeeded by James Wise
Preceded by Trevor Wilson	Australian Ambassador to Myanmar; 2003–2004	Succeeded by Bob Davis
