= Murray Bourchier (diplomat) =

Australian public servant and diplomat (1925–81)

Murray Bourchier AO
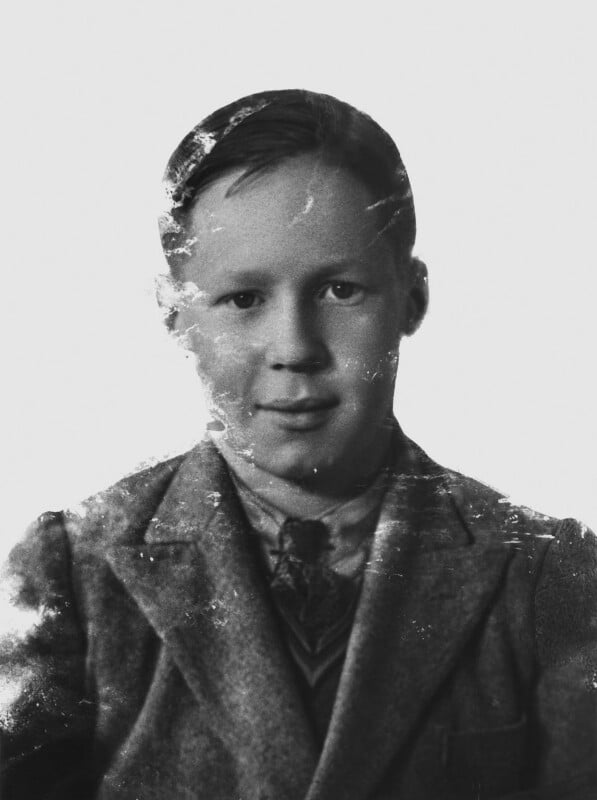
- Bourchier in 1936
- Born: Murray Goulburn Madden Bourchier; 8 March 1925; St Kilda, Victoria, Australia
- Died: 3 July 1981 (aged 56); Deakin, Canberra, Australia
- Education: University of Melbourne (LLB)
- Occupations: Public servant; diplomat
- Spouse: Charlotte Ray Francis (m. 1951)
- Father: Murray Bourchier

Murray Goulburn Madden Bourchier AO (28 March 1925 – 3 July 1981) was an Australian public servant and diplomat.

== Life and career ==
Bourchier joined the Commonwealth Public Service in 1951 as a cadet in the Department of External Affairs.

In August 1971 Bourchier's appointment as Australian Ambassador to the Republic of Korea was announced. He took up his appointment as head of mission in November 1971.

From 1977 to 1980 Bourchier was Australian Ambassador to the Soviet Union. Relationships between the two countries were tense during the period. In 1979 Bourchier was medically evacuated from Moscow to London where he was diagnosed with a cerebral tumour. He stepped down from his post in August 1980.

In June 1981, Bouchier was appointed an Officer in the general division of the Order of Australia in recognition of his services as a diplomatic representative.

Bourchier died at home in Deakin, Canberra, on Friday 3 July 1981.

Diplomatic posts
Preceded by Allan Loomes	Australian Ambassador to South Korea; 1971–1975	Succeeded by John Roger Holdich
Preceded by James Plimsoll	Australian Ambassador to the Soviet Union; Australian Ambassador to Mongolia; 1977–1980	Succeeded by David Evans
