= Piers Akerman =

Australian journalist and editor

- Born: 12 June 1950 (age 76); Wewak, Territory of Papua and New Guinea
- Education: Year 10 Certificate; Guildford Grammar School
- Occupation: Columnist / political commentator
- Spouse: Suzanne

Piers Akerman (born 12 June 1950) is an Australian columnist and conservative commentator for the conservative Sydney newspaper The Daily Telegraph.

== Biography ==
Akerman was born in Wewak, Papua New Guinea, the third son in a family of four children of John, an Australian Government doctor, and Eve Akerman (d. 2003), a newspaper columnist and reviewer. The family left PNG for India in 1951, before returning to Perth, Western Australia.

He attended Guildford Grammar School, where he remained until his expulsion, when he was "asked to leave" following a dispute with the headmaster. He spent the last few months of his schooling at Christ Church Grammar School but did not complete his final exams.

== Career ==
Akerman worked for a time at British national newspaper, The Times, and spent ten years as a foreign correspondent in the United States. On returning to Australia, he was editor of The Advertiser, Adelaide (1988) and The Sunday Herald Sun, Melbourne (1990). During 1990-92 he was editor-in-chief of the Herald & Weekly Times group in Melbourne before becoming a vice-president of Fox News, USA in 1993.

Mark Latham was known to weave complaints about Akerman's writing into his speeches.

Periodically, Akerman was a regular panelist on ABC Television's political commentary program Insiders, until his 16 June 2013 participation. This incident involved unfounded allegations about the then Prime Minister's de facto partner. Akerman had also appeared on the ABC's political program Q&A.

== Controversies ==
=== Climate change denial ===
Akerman is a climate change denier with a history of public opposition to a carbon price. He approvingly quotes the work of the Nongovernmental International Panel on Climate Change (NIPCC), run by Fred Singer.

In a November 2006 article in The Daily Telegraph, Akerman mis-quoted senior IPCC scientist John T. Houghton saying "Unless we announce disasters, no one will listen", attributing the quotation to his 1994 book Global Warming, The Complete Briefing. The mis-quote became widely used among climate change deniers to argue that climate change scientists showed a propensity to exaggerate their case. However, the mis-quote does not appear in any edition of the book. Houghton denied saying any such thing and believes the opposite to be true, commenting "I would never say we should hype up the risk of climate disasters in order to get noticed." In February 2010, Akerman responded by citing a September 1995 article in which Houghton was correctly quoted as saying "If we want a good environmental policy in the future, we'll have to have a disaster", adding that this passage was not much different to the misquotation Houghton had distanced himself from. A subsequent report by Media Watch noted that Houghton's full remark did not carry the same meaning: "If we want a good environmental policy in the future we'll have to have a disaster. It's like safety on public transport. The only way humans will act is if there's been an accident."

=== Sexual harassment ===
Five former employees, three of whom agreed to be named, have said they witnessed Akerman "sexually harass" female members of his staff, according to a 1991 story in The Sunday Age.

=== Assault threat ===
One of the most controversial episodes in Akerman's life was his alleged threat to assault the literary editor of The Advertiser, Shirley Stott Despoja. The dispute ended before a full bench of the Supreme Court where the newspaper appealed against Stott Despoja's successful worker's compensation claim for stress-related sick leave pay. Stott Despoja alleged: "I was physically threatened by the editor while alone with him in an office in a dispute over my work". The appeal by The Advertiser was dismissed and Stott Despoja won her $4,000 claim.

=== Defamation ===
In 2006, former director of NRMA Richard James Talbot was awarded a $200,000 defamation payout plus costs. In regards to one point the judgment read "The inaccuracies of fact by the defendant [Akerman] on this topic are gross".

=== LGBT rights ===
In March 2018 Akerman suggested that gay people need to apologise for child sex abuse.

==== Same-sex marriage ====
In 2017, Akerman wrote that there were more pressing issues worrying Australians than voting on the issue of same-sex marriage.

In 2018 he called the victory of the YES in Australian Marriage Law Postal Survey "a victory for left's hate".
