= Alfred Parsons (diplomat) =

Australian diplomat

Alfred Parsons AO

High Commissioner to the United Kingdom
- In office 22 December 1983 – March 1987
- Preceded by: Victor Garland
- Succeeded by: Doug McClelland

Personal details
- Born: 24 May 1925 Hobart, Tasmania
- Died: 19 June 2010 (aged 85) Canberra, ACT
- Education: University of Tasmania
- Occupation: Public servant, diplomat

Alfred Roy Parsons AO (24 May 1925 – 19 June 2010) was an Australian diplomat from 1947 to 1988. He was the Australian High Commissioner to the United Kingdom from 1983 to 1987, only the second career diplomat to hold the position.

Parsons was born in Hobart and educated at Hobart High School and the University of Tasmania. He joined the Department of External Affairs (now the Department of Foreign Affairs and Trade) in Canberra in 1947. He was posted to Australian missions in Jakarta, Rangoon, Singapore, Kuala Lumpur, Berlin, the United Nations (New York City), and London. His postings to Singapore, Kuala Lumpur and London were as High Commissioner. From 1976 to 1984, he was a Deputy Secretary of the department, responsible for Asian affairs.

He died in Canberra in 2010, aged 85, survived by his wife, Jill, two sons and a daughter.

== Honours ==
- Appointed an Officer of the Order of Australia (AO) on 9 June 1986 for "Public service as a diplomatic representative".
- Awarded the Centenary Medal on 1 January 2001 for "A significant contribution over many years to international relations".

Diplomatic posts
Preceded by Bill Pritchett	Australian High Commissioner to Singapore; 1967–1970	Succeeded by Nick Parkinson
Preceded by John Rowland	Australian High Commissioner to Malaysia; 1972–1976	Succeeded by Graham Feakes
Preceded by Sir Victor Garland	Australian High Commissioner to the United Kingdom; 1983–1987	Succeeded by Doug McClelland
