= Bill Paterson (diplomat) =

Bill Paterson PSM
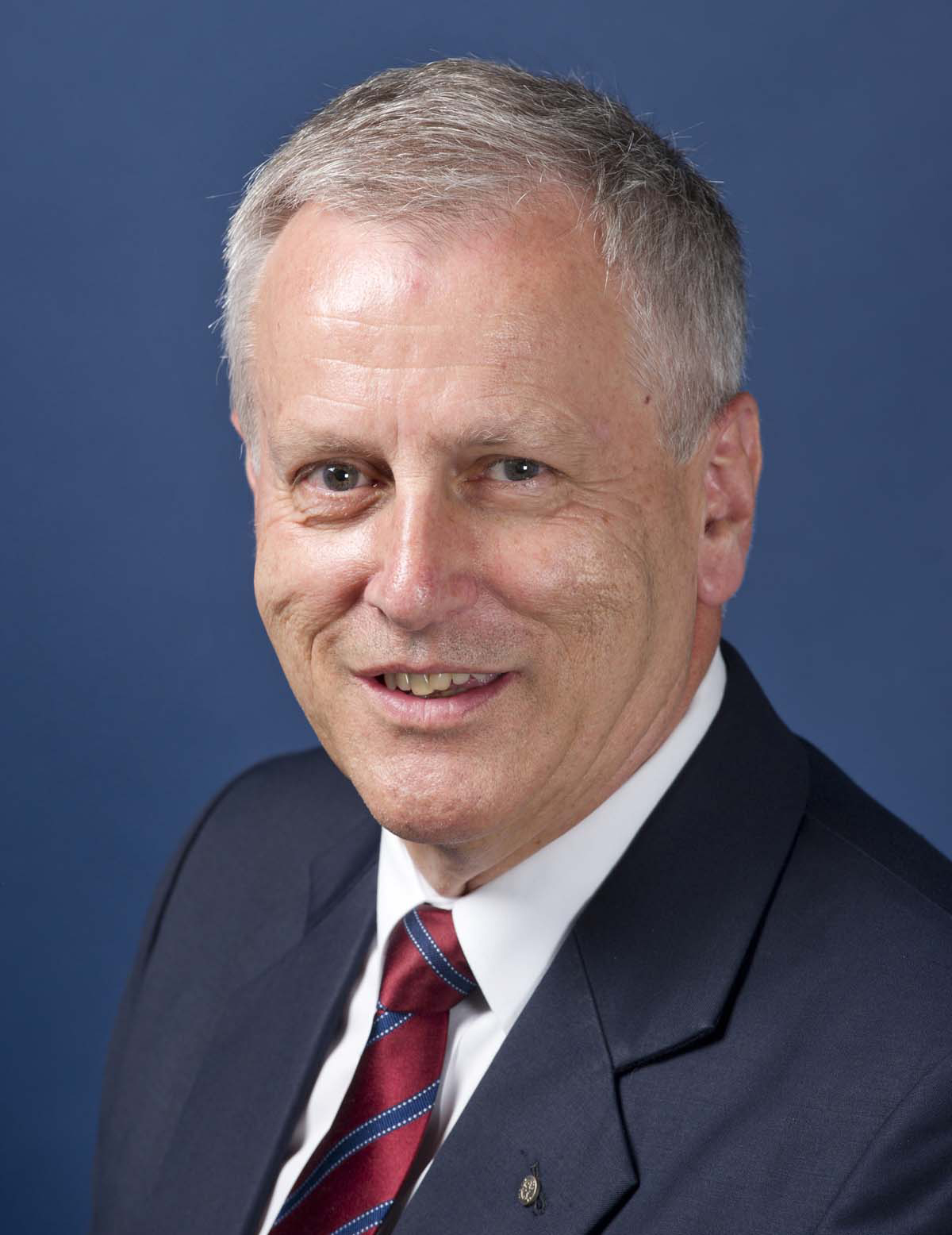
- Born: Ballarat, Victoria
- Education: University of Melbourne (BA)
- Occupations: Diplomat, public servant

William Paterson PSM is a senior career officer with the Department of Foreign Affairs and Trade. He served as the Australian Ambassador to the Republic of Korea until the end of 2016.

== Early life ==
Paterson was born in Ballarat, Victoria. He received a Bachelor of Arts (Honours) from the University of Melbourne.

== Career ==
Before taking up his position in Korea he was First Assistant Secretary, International Security Division in Canberra and Australian Ambassador for Counter-Terrorism. Prior to this, Paterson was the head of the Australian Government's Iraq Task Force and Anti-Terrorism Task Force.

Paterson has previously served as Ambassador to Thailand, Minister at the Australian Embassy in Tokyo, Counsellor at the Australian Embassy in Washington and in earlier postings to Vienna, Baghdad and Dhaka. He was also Chief of Staff to Foreign Minister Alexander Downer in 2000.

Paterson was awarded the Public Service Medal in 2004 and the Humanitarian Overseas Service Medal in 2005.

Diplomatic posts
Preceded by Miles Kupa	Australian Ambassador to Thailand; 2005–2008	Succeeded by Paul Grigson
Preceded by Sam Gerovich	Australian Ambassador to South Korea; 2013–2016	Succeeded by James Choi
Preceded by Sam Gerovich	Australian Ambassador to Mongolia; 2013–2015	Succeeded by John Langtry
