= George Molnar =

Hungarian born, Australian architect and cartoonist (1910–1998)

George Molnar OBE AO
- Born: 25 April 1910; Nagyvárad, Hungary
- Died: 16 November 1998 (aged 88); Sydney
- Education: University of Budapest
- Occupations: Architect; Cartoonist; University Lecturer
- Awards: AO, 1988; OBE, 1971

George Molnar OBE AO (Hungarian: Molnár György) (25 April 1910, Nagyvárad – 16 November 1998, Sydney) was born in Nagyvárad, Austria-Hungary and came to Australia in 1939 as a sponsored migrant, to take up a job as government architect. His talents were such that in Australia he became a much admired cartoonist and an architecture lecturer. Molnar studied architecture and engineering in Budapest, graduating in 1932. He initially worked as a government architect in Canberra. Later he taught architecture at University of New South Wales and University of Sydney School of Architecture, Design and Planning.

His friendship with Bernard Hesling led to his being employed as a cartoonist for the Daily Telegraph from 1945 before moving to the Sydney Morning Herald in 1954.

In 1971, he was awarded an OBE for services to journalism and architecture. and became an officer of the Order of Australia in 1988.

== Articles ==
Molnar, George (Summer 1956–1957). "Good Manners in Street Architecture". Quadrant. 1 (1): 37–45.

== Bibliography ==
- Human scale in architecture: George Molnar's Sydney / Jo Holder, Robert Freestone and Joan Kerr (2003, ISBN 1-877004-29-4)
- – A discussion about Molnar with host Phillip Adams and guests Jo Holder and Joan Kerr for Australian Broadcasting Corporation radio
- Life in Canberra / by Alan Fitzgerald with illustrations by George Molnar (1975, ISBN 0-909278-01-6)
