= Mario Despoja =

Croatian-Australian political activist

Mario Dešpoja
- Born: Croatia
- Years active: 1963-1995
- Known for: "Croatian Embassy" in Australia; 1977-1979

Mario Dešpoja is a Croatian Australian who opened an unofficial Croatian embassy in Australia's capital city, Canberra in 1977. The embassy was on a main road and attracted much publicity until it was closed down two years later.

He is the father of former Australian Democrats leader Natasha Stott Despoja.

== Personal life ==
Despoja arrived in Australia in 1959 without any English. He regarded himself as a political refugee. Four years later, he won the grand prize on a television quiz program, Coles £3000 Question, broadcast around Australia. His special category was Australian history, and he was able to name the five convicts transported to Australia in 1794 now known as the Scottish Martyrs. Despoja said that "their case stuck in (his) mind" because they were political exiles like him.

At the time of his big win, Despoja was working as a press operator at the Chrysler Australia factory in Adelaide. He was earning £12 a week. The prize money enabled him to buy a block of land on which he built a house and to attend university to obtain a bachelor's degree with an honours thesis on Yugoslav history. In addition to operating the unofficial Croatian Embassy, Despoja has worked in the Australian Commonwealth's Department of Aboriginal Affairs and as a real estate agent.

Despoja met his first wife, journalist Shirley Stott, through the quiz show. In their 12 years of marriage they had two children, Natasha and Luke.

He now is married to Wendy Austin, and lives with her in Canberra, as a retired diplomat, quiz champion, public servant and real estate agent.

== Public life ==
Despoja first came to mainstream public notice as a campaigner for Croatian independence in June 1977 when he was nominated as a candidate for an international Croatian National Council. In August, a letter from him headed, "Nationalism in Yugoslavia" appeared in The Canberra Times. It pointed out that a previous anonymous correspondent on Croatian issues probably was a Serb. Then, on 29 November 1977, Yugoslavia's National Day, the Croatian community in Australia opened its "Embassy" on Canberra Avenue, Forrest, with Despoja as the "chargé d'affaires".

A building with external insignia purporting to represent one of the constituent republics of Yugoslavia was a diplomatic embarrassment to Australia, which had long recognised the communist Government of the Socialist Federal Republic of Yugoslavia. On 5 April 1978, the Minister for Foreign Affairs, Andrew Peacock made a statement to the lower house of the Australian Parliament about the "Croatian Embassy", in which he said that, " the so-called Croatian Embassy is damaging to the national interest and that such an establishment cannot therefore be tolerated". In the same statement, he promised legislation to give the force of Australian law to the nation's obligations under the Vienna Convention on Diplomatic Relations. The response of the Croatian community in Australia was a decision to seek official recognition for the "embassy".

The Parliament passed a Diplomatic and Consular Missions Act in August 1978. This was a law "to prevent the improper use of diplomatic and consular signs and titles". Still, the Government did not move against the Croatian Embassy for another nine months. On 6 June 1979, two Commonwealth policemen delivered a letter from the Attorney-General, Peter Durack, warning that the Government would begin legal action in two weeks unless Mario Despoja provided certain undertakings. They were that he stop displaying insignia "that represents in a diplomatic or consular capacity a part of Yugoslavia, namely Croatia, or the people of such part of Yugoslavia" and that he stop publishing or permitting to be made or published "any representation that states or implies or is reasonably capable of being taken to imply that there is located in Australia a mission (other than a diplomatic or consular mission of Yugoslavia) that represents in a diplomatic or consular capacity a part of Yugoslavia, namely Croatia, or the people of such part of Yugoslavia". Despoja's considered response was to hold teleconferences around Australia with other Croatian community leaders over the following weekend before taking the matter to the "Embassy's" lawyers.

The Commonwealth's arguments before the Federal Court of Australia succeeded on 7 August 1979, when Mr Justice Reginald Smithers granted an injunction against Despoja. The injunction forbade Despoja from displaying any signs, insignia or flags giving the impression of an embassy and from publicising the "Embassy" as representing a part of the Socialist Federal Republic of Yugoslavia. Despoja was ordered to pay the court costs. Despoja's response to the court order was to resign as "chargé d'affaires" and commence as the "Embassy's" "special adviser in non-diplomatic and consular matters". The "Embassy's" former secretary, Dinka Sidic took up the "chargé d'affaires" position, becoming the youngest "head of mission" in Canberra at the age of 23.

Three judges of the Federal Court of Australia on 9 October 1979 dismissed Despoja's appeal against the injunction granted by Mr Justice Smithers. Despoja and Sidic closed the doors of their "Embassy" two weeks later. According to Sidic, the legal advice they had received was that an appeal to the High Court could have extended the "Embassy's" life by another eight months but they would have lost the appeal. The flag and insignia at the "Embassy" were to come down under the cover of darkness on 25 October, "to spare the Croatian people the sight of seeing them removed", according to Despoja.

The next election for the Croatian National Council was held about the same time and found Mario Despoja receiving the most votes among the 93 international candidates contesting 30 positions. Dinka Sidic also stood for election but did not receive enough support to be one of the chosen 30. Special precautions were taken to protect Despoja, as his two predecessors as top vote-getters had died, one supposedly at the hands of Yugoslav assassins.

Despoja next appeared before the English-speaking public as Adviser, Foreign Relations Department, to the Croatian National Congress (Australasia) (sic), which conveyed its point of view on Tito's Yugoslavia through an advertisement in The Canberra Times on 1 May 1980. The newly married Dinka Crgic-Sidic, Adviser, Press and Information Department, was a co-signatory.

Members of the governing, conservative Liberal Party of Australia had supported Despoja and the "Embassy" on a number of occasions. Despite this, the Croatian National Congress urged Croats in Australia to vote against the Liberals in the Federal elections to be held on 18 October 1980. Despoja claimed that Croatians were prepared to change their votes for a number of reasons, including closure of the "Embassy". In the event, the Liberal Party lost 13 seats but still won the election.

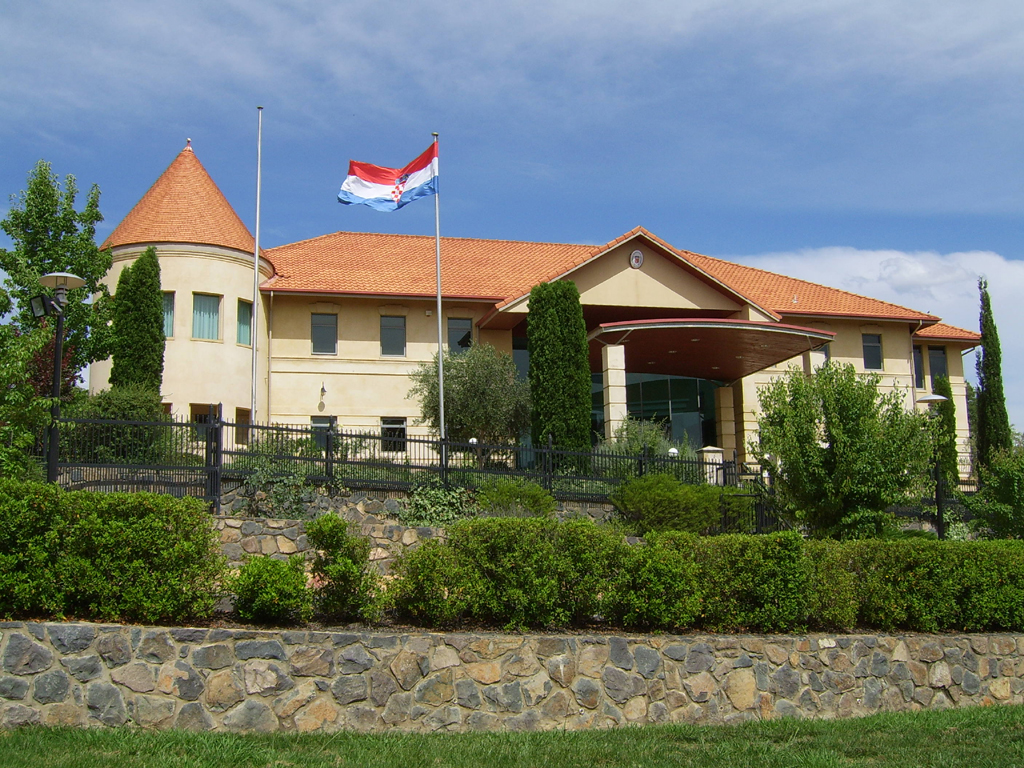
The Recognised Croatian Embassy in Canberra

Despoja's "diplomatic" career had ended by October 1982 when the first of many property advertisements featuring him as the real estate agent appeared in The Canberra Times An admirer summed up his contribution ten years later, when she wrote to the Editor of The Canberra Times that, "People may have short memories, especially in the political arena, but history has already marked the name of Mario Despoja as one of the champions of the 20th century fight for Croatian democracy".

On 21 June 1995, Mario Despoja watched Croatia's first elected president, Franjo Tudjman open his nation's official embassy in Canberra.
