= Claude Massey =

Australian public servant and diplomat

- Born: 1 November 1889; Melbourne, Victoria, Australia
- Died: 21 May 1968 (aged 78); Sydney, New South Wales, Australia
- Education: University of Sydney
- Occupations: Public servant, diplomat

Claude Massey (1 November 1889 – 21 May 1968) was an Australian public servant and diplomat.

Diplomatic posts
Vacant Title last held by Vivian Gordon Bowden as Official Representative	Australian Commissioner to Malaya; 1946	Succeeded by James Payne as Trade Commissioner
New title Position established	Australian Minister to Egypt; 1950–1953	Succeeded by Hugh McClure Smith
