= Natasha Stott Despoja =

Australian politician

Natasha Stott Despoja AC
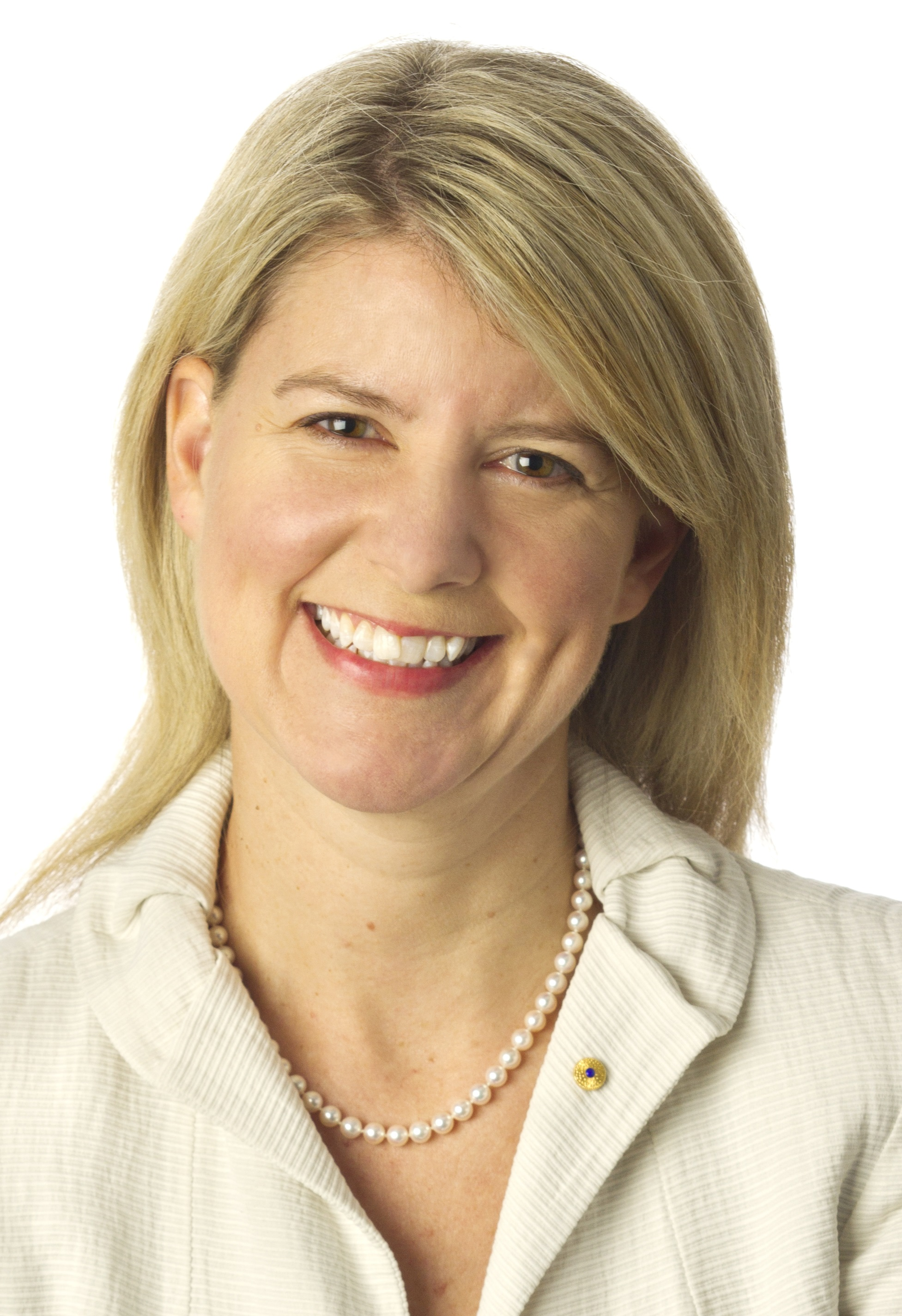
- Stott Despoja in 2012

Australia Ambassador for Women and Girls
- In office 16 December 2013 – 21 November 2016
- Preceded by: Penny Williams
- Succeeded by: Sharman Stone

7th Leader of the Australian Democrats
- In office 6 April 2001 – 21 August 2002
- Deputy: Aden Ridgeway
- Preceded by: Meg Lees
- Succeeded by: Brian Greig

6th Deputy Leader of the Australian Democrats
- In office 15 October 1997 – 6 April 2001
- Leader: Meg Lees
- Preceded by: Meg Lees
- Succeeded by: Aden Ridgeway

Senator for South Australia
- In office 29 November 1995 – 30 June 2008
- Preceded by: John Coulter
- Succeeded by: Sarah Hanson Young

Personal details
- Born: Natasha Jessica Stott Despoja; 9 September 1969 (age 57) Adelaide, South Australia, Australia
- Party: Australian Democrats
- Spouse: Ian Smith (m. 2001; sep. 2024)
- Parents: Mario Despoja (father); Shirley Stott (mother)
- Education: Pembroke School
- Alma mater: University of Adelaide
- Occupation: Policy advisor; Union organiser; Politician

Natasha Jessica Stott Despoja (born 9 September 1969) is an Australian diplomat, gender equality advocate, former Australian of the Year nominee, and former politician. Starting her career in student politics, she became an advisor to the Australian Democrats and was appointed to the Australian Senate in 1995 at the age of 26. At the time, she was the youngest woman to serve in Federal Parliament. She went on to become deputy leader of the Democrats in 1997 and then federal leader from 2001 to 2002. She retired from the Senate in 2008 as the longest-serving senator from her party.

She has remained active in the public sphere, working with government and non-profit organisations. She was appointed Officer of the Order of Australia in 2019 for her work on gender equality. Stott Despoja was the founding chair of Our Watch, a national foundation to prevent violence against women and children, and served as national Ambassador for Women and Girls from 2013 to 2016. She was also a member of the World Bank Gender Advisory Council from 2015 to 2017. She has served in positions at the United Nations, including on the High Level Working Group on the Health and Human Rights of Women, Children, and Adolescents in 2017, and as a member of the Convention on the Elimination of all forms of Discrimination Against Women (CEDAW) since 2020. She has published several books and writes regularly on current topics.

== Early life and education ==
Stott Despoja was born in Adelaide on 9 September 1969. She is the daughter of Shirley Stott Despoja, an Australian-born journalist and Mario Despoja, who was from Croatia (then part of Yugoslavia). She attended Stradbroke Primary and Pembroke School and later graduated from the University of Adelaide in 1991. She was President of the Students' Association of the University of Adelaide (SAUA) and the South Australian Women's Officer for the National Union of Students. She then went on to work as a political advisor to Senator John Coulter and Senator Cheryl Kernot.

== Political career ==
When Democrats Senator John Coulter resigned for health reasons in 1995, Stott Despoja was the successful candidate to fill the resulting vacancy. Her rise to prominence began when she won a full term in the 1996 election the following year, becoming the youngest woman ever elected to the federal Parliament at age 26. Late the following year, following the resignation of Cheryl Kernot and the rise of Meg Lees to the leadership of the Democrats, Stott Despoja was elected deputy leader of the Democrats. During this time, she built her image as spokesperson for Employment, Higher Education, Youth, Science and Information Technology, Consumer Affairs, Trade, and the Republic.

During the passage of the Goods and Services Tax (GST) legislation in 1999, Stott Despoja and Andrew Bartlett split with the party's other senators by opposing the package, which had been negotiated by Lees and prime minister John Howard. She said that she refused to break promises made during the election. The party had stated that they would work with whichever party formed government to improve their tax package. The Australian Democrats traditionally permitted parliamentary representatives to cast a conscience vote on any issue but, on this occasion, close numbers in the Senate placed greater pressure than usual on the dissenters.

=== Leader of the Democrats ===
The passage of the GST was not popular among the Democrats membership. Unlike other parties, the members directly elected the party leader and a spill could be called at any time with 100 signatures. Meg Lees had been subject to such a challenge before but was re-elected unopposed as no other senator opted to run. By early 2001, the party's fortunes were declining. The state election in Western Australia in February, where the Democrats lost both their seats in the upper house, was particularly damaging and prompted another spill campaign against Lees. Stott Despoja, who by this time was widely recognised and popular among voters, decided to run and was successful, winning 69% of votes.

Stott Despoja became the leader of her party on 6 April 2001. From the beginning she faced difficulties in working with Lees, who viewed her run for the leadership as a betrayal. Other senators, including new deputy leader Aden Ridgeway, remained sympathetic to Lees. In the 2001 federal election in November, the Democrats recorded a fall in their Senate vote from 8.5% to 7.3% and returned four of the five senators up for election. The party also saw a marginal lift in its primary vote for the lower house from 5.1% to 5.4%. The substantial rise of the Greens vote to 4.9% in the Senate and their election of a second senator ignited further discussion about the fortunes of the Democrats.

Throughout 2002, Stott Despoja struggled to keep the party together as senators publicly strayed from party positions and privately expressed a lack of confidence in her leadership. After the party bureaucracy opened an investigation into Meg Lees for allegedly damaging party unity, which Lees and her allies saw as part of a campaign by Stott Despoja to silence her, Lees left the party in July 2002. This was followed by a stand-off with Andrew Murray, who threatened to follow. After deciding to stay, Murray proposed a ten-point package to reform party structures and address the issues raised by Lees, designed to shift power from the leader. At a party room meeting on 21 August, all ten measures were passed four votes to three: Murray, Ridgeway, Lyn Allison and John Cherry in favour, with Stott Despoja and her allies Andrew Bartlett and Brian Greig against. Understanding her position to be untenable after this defeat, Stott Despoja announced her resignation to the Senate. She had been leader for 16 and a half months.

=== Post-leadership ===
Stott Despoja remained active in the Senate and the Democrats after resigning as leader. The party's fortunes continued to decline under new leader Andrew Bartlett. In the 2004 election they failed to elect any senators, leaving only the four elected in 2001: Stott Despoja, Andrew Bartlett, Lyn Allison, and Andrew Murray.

In 2004, Stott Despoja took 11 weeks' leave from the Senate following the birth of her first child. She returned to full duties as spokesperson for Higher Education, Science and Biotechnology, Women, Privacy, Territories and Local Government, and Work and Family.

During her career, Stott Despoja introduced 24 private member's bills on issues including paid maternity leave, the Republic, genetic privacy, stem cells, captioning, and same-sex marriage. Stott Despoja regularly attends the Sydney Gay and Lesbian Mardi Gras.

On 22 October 2006, after undergoing emergency surgery for an ectopic pregnancy, she announced that she would not contest the 2007 election and would leave office at the expiration of her term on 30 June 2008. She was the Australian Democrats' longest-serving senator. As in 2004, the Democrats elected no senators in 2007, and Stott Despoja's retirement coincided with the end of her party's federal parliamentary representation.

== Post-political career ==
Stott Despoja has been a casual host on ABC Radio Adelaide, a guest panellist on Channel 10's The Project and a columnist for the Australian business news website Business Spectator. She has also been a columnist for The Advertiser and an honorary visiting research fellow at the University of Adelaide.

She was on the board of the Burnet Institute (Australia's largest virology and communicable disease research institute) from 2008 until December 2013. On 21 July 2015, Stott Despoja returned to the Burnet Institute as a patron. She was no longer a patron by May 2023.

In 2010, she taught a course at winter school at the University of Adelaide with former foreign minister Alexander Downer, called "The Practice of Australian Politics".

She was a board member of non-profit organisations the South Australian Museum from 2009 to 2013; the Museum of Australian Democracy from 2010 to 2013; and the Advertising Standards Board from 2008 to 2013. She was a deputy chair at beyondblue, Australia's national depression initiative.

She has been an ambassador for Ovarian Cancer Australia, The Orangutan Project; Cancer Australia; secondbite; and the HIV/AIDS anti-stigma campaign, ENUF (along with her husband Ian Smith).

In July 2013, Stott Despoja was the founding chair of Our Watch, originally named Foundation to Prevent Violence Against Women and their Children. She left the position in July 2021, and was appointed life patron in August 2022. Our Watch is a joint initiative of the Victorian and Commonwealth Governments, based in Melbourne. It is an independent non-profit organisation that is now jointly funded by all states and territories of Australia, after the New South Wales Government was the last state government to join the organisation in 2019.

Foreign minister Julie Bishop announced the appointment of Stott Despoja as Australia's new Ambassador for Women and Girls in December 2013, a role she held until 2016. This involved visiting some 45 countries to promote women's economic empowerment and leadership and to help reduce violence against women and girls.

Stott Despoja has also been an election observer for the US-based National Democratic Institute in Nigeria (2011); visited Burkina Faso for Oxfam (2012); and went to Laos (2011) and Burma (2013) with The Burnet Institute. She was mentioned in June 2014 as a possible replacement for Kevin Scarce as the next Governor of South Australia, however Hieu Van Le was chosen.

In April 2019 Stott Despoja was on the advisory board of the Australian Privacy Foundation. and the Global Women's Institute Leadership Council.

In November 2020, she was elected to the UN Committee on the Elimination of Discrimination against Women, becoming the first Australian member in 28 years.

In 2022, she delivered the Hugh Stretton Oration at the University of Adelaide. She was also a nominee for South Australia's Australian of the Year.

In March 2024, Stott Despoja was appointed as South Australia's Royal Commissioner into Domestic, Family, and Sexual Violence, after the Royal Commission into Domestic, Family and Sexual Violence had been announced by Premier Peter Malinauskas in December 2023. On 1 July 2024, she began her role as royal commissioner. On 19 August 2025 the Royal Commission published its 600-page report, which included 136 recommendations for changes.

Stott Despoja was announced as the head of an inquiry into sexual violence in the defence in September 2026. The inquiry was recommended by the Royal Commission into Defence and Veteran Suicide. The inquiry will last for one year and Stott Despoja was chosen because she can look at any issues from an independent point of view.

== Writing ==
Stott Despoja has authored a large number of essays, reports, and non-fiction works on a range of topics, both during and since her political career.

In March 2019 she published On Violence, with the publisher's blurb asking "Why is violence against women endemic, and how do we stop it?". Stott Despoja posits that violence against women is "Australia's national emergency", with one woman dying at the hands of her partner or someone she knows every week. This violence is preventable, and that we need to "create a new normal".

== Honours and accolades ==
In 1999, she was appointed a Global Leader for Tomorrow by the World Economic Forum (WEF).

Despoja was awarded a Member of the Order of Australia in June 2011 for her "service to the Parliament of Australia, particularly as a Senator for South Australia, through leadership roles with the Australian Democrats, to education, and as a role model for women".

She is as of April 2019 listed as one of the "Gender Equality Top 100" by the UK organisation Apolitical.

In June 2019 Despoja was appointed as an Officer of the Order of Australia for her "distinguished service to the global community as an advocate for gender equality, and through roles in a range of organisations". She was promoted to Companion of the Order of Australia in the 2026 King's Birthday Honours for "eminent service to the prevention of domestic, family and sexual violence, to gender equity, and to the promotion of human rights and global systemic change".

== Personal life ==
Stott Despoja was married to former Liberal Party advisor Ian Smith, whom she married in a beachside ceremony in Byron Bay in 2003. They have two children. The couple announced their separation in 2024.

== Bibliography ==
=== Books ===
- Giving Generously (Artemis, 1996)
- DIY Feminism (Allen and Unwin, 1996)
- Collective Wisdom: Interviews with Prominent Australians (Clown, 1998)
- Free East Timor: Australia's Culpability in East Timor's Genocide (Random House, 1998)
- Goodbye normal gene: Confronting the Genetic Revolution (Pluto Press, 1999)
- What Women Want (Random House, 2002)
- Time for a Change: Australia in the 21st Century (Hardie Grant, 2006)
- Mother Who? Personal Stories and Insights on Juggling Family, Work and Life (Big Sky, 2007)
- On Violence (Melbourne University Press, March 2019)

=== Essays and reporting ===
- 'Higher Education in Perspective', Current Affairs Bulletin, 1996
- 'Personal and Private', Alternative Law Journal, 1997
- 'Policy forum: the Junior Pay Rates Inquiry', Australian Economic Review, 1999
- 'Leadership', Sydney Papers, 2001
- 'Terror in the USA', The Asia–Australia Papers, 2001
- 'The Human Genome Project: how do we protect Australians?', Medical Journal of Australia, 2000
- 'ANZUS? ANZ who?' (with Senator Andrew Bartlett), Australian Journal of International Affairs, 2001
- 'Towards a National Interest Commissioner', CEDA Bulletin, 2001
- 'If I were Attorney-General', Alternative Law Journal, 2003
- 'The first in human genetics regulation', Australasian Science, 2005
- 'A brief look at the history of privacy', Australian Quarterly, 2007
- Stott Despoja, Natasha (2014). "Women, peace and security : Australia in the UNSC" (PDF). International Humanitarian Law Magazine (2): 14–15.

Party political offices
Preceded by Meg Lees	Leader of the Australian Democrats; 2001–2002	Succeeded by (interim) Brian Greig
Diplomatic posts
Preceded by Penny Williams	Ambassador of Australia for Women and Girls; 2013–2016	Succeeded by Sharman Stone
