= Joseph Mellor Hanson =

British-born modernist painter (1900–1963)

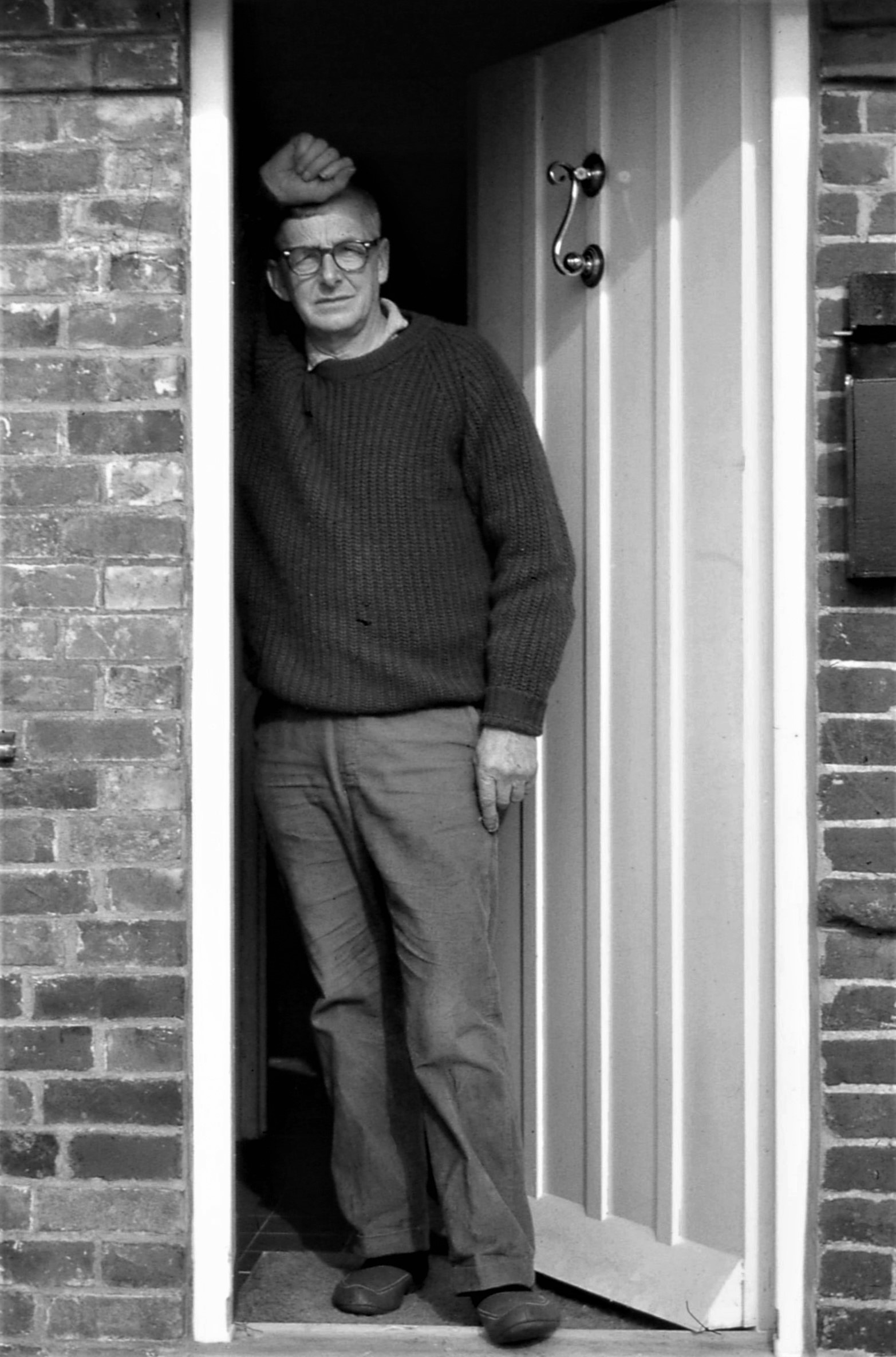
- Artist Joseph Mellor Hanson at his home in Sussex, a few weeks before his death in 1963
- Born: December 10, 1900
- Died: July 2, 1963 (aged 62)
- Education: Halifax Technical College (1917-1924); Training: Paris (1925-1935)
- Spouse: Gudrun Hanson

Signature
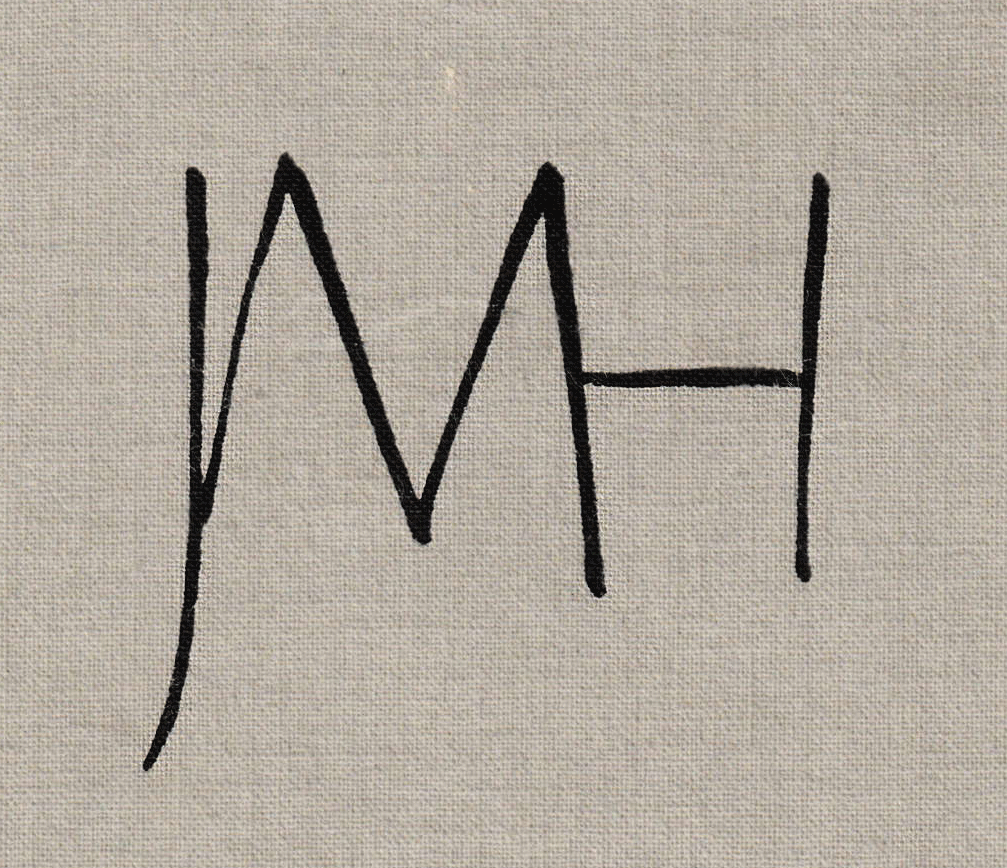

Website
- normandaly.com/biography/joseph-hanson

Joseph Mellor Hanson (1900-1963) was a British-born modernist painter who worked primarily in figure painting, with an abstract approach. His work can be placed in the tradition of geometric abstraction.

== Education ==
Hanson was born on the family farm in the West Riding of Yorkshire, England. He began studying art at fifteen and took evening drawing classes to prepare him for admission to Halifax Technical College. He received a McRae Scholarship at nineteen to support his studies and graduated in 1924.

== Training ==
Hanson studied in Paris from 1925 to 1935 with Othon Friesz and was his first student; he subsequently became Friesz’ assistant in his studio. By 1928, Hanson had progressed far enough to participate in the Salon des Artistes Indépendants and presented a solo exhibition at the Galerie “Mots et Images”. He continued to paint and exhibit throughout his life.

During his years in Paris, Hanson was associated with several influential artists of the period, Andre L’Hôte, Fernand Léger, Jean Hélion, as well as Othon Friesz. He was also closely associated with Amédée Ozenfant, acting from 1927 to 1935 as his assistant in the execution of murals and helping with the instruction of pupils in his private art academy.

== Career ==
In 1935 Hanson returned to England, and after a year in London, he taught until 1938 in a small grammar school in Shropshire. In 1939 he settled in New York City and, in 1945, began teaching at Cornell University. At his retirement he was a professor of art in the College of Architecture, which is now a part of the Cornell University College of Architecture, Art and Planning.

Hanson worked in a highly disciplined style and left behind a relatively small but distinguished body of work. A large portion of his art was donated to the Andrew Dickson White Museum of Art, now the Herbert F. Johnson Museum of Art at Cornell University as a bequest of the artist. His work was explored by Paul Ziff in his 1962 monograph on the artist published by the Cornell University Press.

== Exhibitions ==
- Galerie "Mots et Images," Paris, France 1928
- Société des Artistes Indépendants (a.k.a. Salon des Sur-Indépendants) Paris, France 1928-1929-1930
- Galerie Aubier, Paris, France 1929
- Galerie Jeanne Castel, Paris, France 1935
- Wertheim Gallery, London, England 1937-1938
- Bankfield Museum, Halifax, England 1938
- Passedoit Gallery, New York, New York, U.S. 1941-1957
- The Carnegie Institute, Pittsburgh, Pennsylvania, U.S. 1943-1950
- Art Institute of Chicago, Chicago, Illinois, U.S. 1950
- Toledo Museum of Art, Toledo, Ohio, U.S. 1950
- Cranbrook Academy of Art, Bloomfield Hills, Michigan, U.S. 1953
- Museum of Modern Art, 25th Anniversary, New York, New York, U.S. 1954
- Nebraska Art Association, Lincoln, Nebraska, U.S. 1954
- Corcoran Gallery of Art, Washington, D.C., U.S. 1959
- Herbert F. Johnson Museum of Art (Formerly the A.D. White MuseumW) Ithaca, New York, U.S. 1960

== Museum collections ==
- Bankfield Museum, Halifax, England
- Museum of Modern Art, New York, New York U.S.
- Georgia Museum of Art, Athens, Georgia, U.S.
- National Museum Cardiff, Cardiff, Wales
- The Hepworth Wakefield, Yorkshire, England
- William Rockhill Nelson Gallery of Art, Kansas City, Missouri, U.S.
- Herbert F. Johnson Museum of Art, Ithaca, New York, U.S.
