= Laurence McIntyre =

Australian public servant and diplomat (1912–1981)

Sir Laurence McIntyre AC CBE
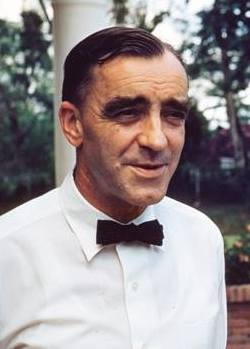
- McIntyre in 1958
- Born: Laurence Rupert McIntyre; 22 June 1912; Hobart, Tasmania
- Died: 21 November 1981 (aged 69); Canberra, Australian Capital Territory
- Education: University of Tasmania; University of Oxford
- Occupations: Public servant, diplomat
- Spouse: Judith Mary Gould (m. 1938)
- Children: Dennis and Colin

Sir Laurence Rupert "Jim" McIntyre AC CBE (22 June 1912 – 21 November 1981) was an Australian public servant and diplomat.

== Career ==
McIntyre joined the Department of External Affairs in 1940.

In September 1952, McIntyre was appointed Australian Commissioner for Malaya, having served as Acting Commissioner in the year before.

In November 1959, McIntyre's appointment as Australian Ambassador to Japan was announced. His term in Japan was extended to take in the 1964 Olympic Games in Tokyo.

He was President of the United Nations Security Council in October 1973, during the 1973 Arab–Israeli War and was lauded for capably handling the situation in the role.

== Awards and honours ==
In 1953, McIntyre was made an Officer of the Order of the British Empire whilst he was Commissioner to Malaya in Singapore. He was promoted to a Commander of the Order in 1960 during his posting as Ambassador to Indonesia. In 1963, McIntyre was appointed a Knight Bachelor, whilst on posting as ambassador in Tokyo.

On Australia Day in 1979, McIntyre was made a Companion of the Order of Australia.

The McIntyre Bluffs in Antarctica are named in honour of McIntyre.

Diplomatic posts
Preceded by A. Jack Day as Trade Commissioner	Australian Commissioner to Malaya; 1952–1954	Succeeded by Alan Watt
Preceded by Walter Crocker	Australian Ambassador to Indonesia; 1957–1960	Succeeded by Patrick Shaw
Preceded by Alan Watt	Australian Ambassador to Japan; 1960–1965	Succeeded by Allen Brown
Preceded by Patrick Shaw	Permanent Representative of Australia to the United Nations; 1970–1975	Succeeded by Ralph Harry
