= List of high commissioners of Australia to Singapore =

High Commissioner of Australia to Singapore

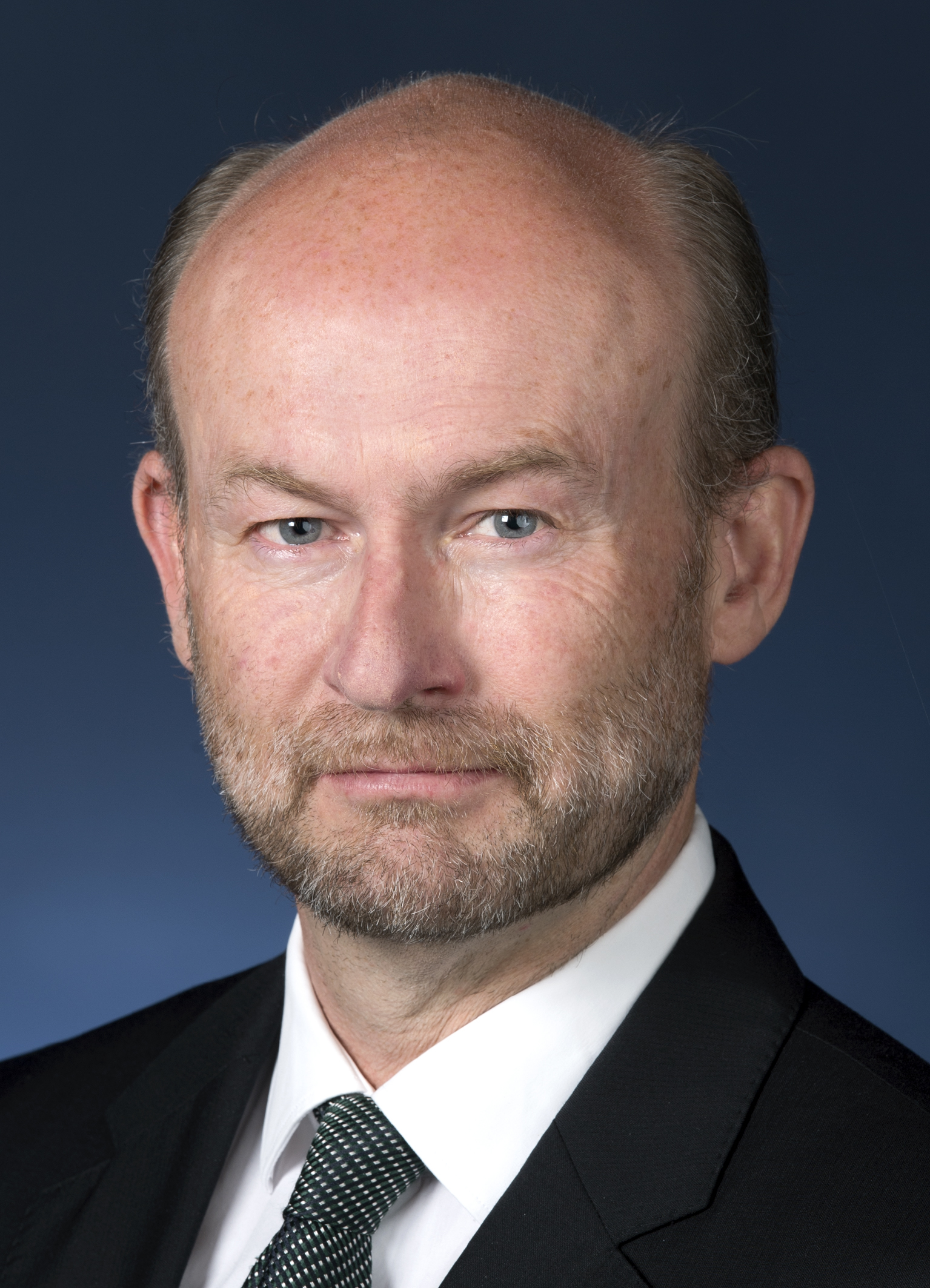
- Incumbent; Allaster Cox since 18 April 2023
- Department of Foreign Affairs and Trade
- Style: His Excellency
- Reports to: Minister for Foreign Affairs
- Residence: 9 White House Park
- Seat: Union Building (1947–55); MacDonald House (1962–67); 25 Napier Road (Since 1977)
- Nominator: Prime Minister of Australia
- Appointer: Governor General of Australia
- Inaugural holder: Bill Pritchett
- Formation: 13 August 1965 (High Commissioner)
- Website: Australian High Commission, Singapore

The high commissioner of Australia to Singapore is an officer of the Australian Department of Foreign Affairs and Trade and the head of the High Commission of the Commonwealth of Australia to the Republic of Singapore. The high commissioner has the rank and status of an ambassador extraordinary and plenipotentiary.

== Posting history ==
The earliest formal diplomatic representation dates from 1922, when Egbert Sheaf was appointed Trade Commissioner for the East based in Singapore, the capital of the British Straits Settlements, who served until January 1925.

On 1 September 1941, the Minister for External Affairs, Sir Frederick Stewart, announced the appointment of Vivian Gordon Bowden as Australia's Official Representative at Singapore, with the aim of being the official intermediary between the Commonwealth Government and the British authorities. Bowden was supported by a Commercial Secretary, Alfred Wootton, and a Third Secretary, John Quinn. Bowden was captured following the Fall of Singapore on 15 February 1942 and was murdered by his Japanese captors two days later, despite his diplomatic status and being a non-combatant prisoner of war. With the end of Japanese occupation, Australia posted a resident Commissioner and Trade Commissioner in post-war Singapore from 1946 representing Australia in British Malaya, North Borneo, Sarawak, as well as Singapore, prior to their federation with Malaysia in 1963, when the post became the Deputy High Commission to Malaysia, reporting to the new High Commission in Kuala Lumpur.

Singapore and Australia have enjoyed official diplomatic relations since 10 August 1965, following Singapore's independence when it was expelled from Malaysia the day before on 9 August. Australia was the first country to recognise Singapore and the serving prime minister at the time of recognition, Sir Robert Menzies, announced "I have informed the Singapore Prime Minister that we will be happy to establish full diplomatic relations with Singapore at the level of high commissioner and that we wish Singapore well in its new sovereignty and look forward to a continuance of close and friendly relations with the new State and with Malaysia." Prime Minister Lee Kuan Yew had made his first visit to Australia in March 1965. Bill Pritchett, who had been serving as deputy high commissioner to Malaysia in Singapore since January 1964, was appointed as the first high commissioner three days after recognition, by Foreign Minister Paul Hasluck.

In 2015, Australia and Singapore celebrated 50 years of diplomatic relations alongside celebrations for 50 years of Singapore's independence.

== Office-holders ==
=== High commissioners ===
#	Officeholder	Term start date	Term end date	Time in office	Notes
1	Bill Pritchett	13 August 1965	February 1967	1 year, 5 months	
2	Alfred Parsons	February 1967	9 June 1970	3 years, 4 months	
3	Nicholas Parkinson	June 1970	December 1973	3 years, 6 months	
4	Robert Birch	December 1973	February 1977	3 years, 2 months	
5	Laurence Corkery	February 1977	January 1978	11 months	
6	Geoffrey Price	January 1978	April 1981	3 years, 3 months	
7	Kenneth McDonald	April 1981	December 1983	2 years, 8 months	
8	Walter Handmer	December 1983	March 1988	4 years, 3 months	
9	Margaret Rosaleen McGovern	March 1988	September 1990	2 years, 6 months	
10	Alan Brown	September 1990	October 1993	3 years, 1 month	
11	Ted Delofski	October 1993	February 1997	3 years, 4 months	
12	Murray McLean	February 1997	August 2001	4 years, 6 months	
13	Gary Quinlan	August 2001	July 2005	3 years, 11 months	
14	Miles Kupa	July 2005	23 October 2008	3 years, 3 months	
15	Doug Chester	23 October 2008	August 2012	3 years, 9 months	
16	Philip Green	25 August 2012	December 2016	4 years, 3 months	
17	Bruce Gosper	January 2017	January 2021	4 years	
18	Will Hodgman	9 February 2021	February 2023	5 years, 210 days	
19	Allaster Cox	18 April 2023	Incumbent	3 years, 142 days	

=== Prior appointments ===
Officeholder	Title	Term start date	Term end date	Time in office	Notes
Egbert Sheaf	Trade Commissioner	25 July 1922	19 January 1925	2 years, 178 days	
Posting abolished
Vivian Gordon Bowden	Official Representative	1 September 1941	14 February 1942	166 days	
Posting closed (due to the Fall of Singapore)
John Charles Rookwood Proud	Political Representative	2 December 1945	21 March 1946	109 days	
Claude Massey	Commissioner for Malaya and South-East Asia	21 March 1946	16 May 1950	4 years, 56 days	
Laurence McIntyre (Acting)	Commissioner for Malaya and South-East Asia	16 May 1950	10 April 1951	329 days	
Tom Critchley	Commissioner for Malaya and South-East Asia	11 April 1951	8 November 1952	1 year, 211 days	
Laurence McIntyre	Commissioner for Malaya and South-East Asia	9 November 1952	23 March 1954	1 year, 134 days	
Alan Watt	Commissioner for Malaya and South-East Asia	23 March 1954	7 April 1956	2 years, 15 days	
Ralph Harry	Commissioner for Singapore, Brunei, Sarawak and North Borneo	7 April 1956	20 September 1957	1 year, 166 days	
Alexander Hay Borthwick (Acting)	Commissioner for Singapore, Brunei, Sarawak and North Borneo	20 September 1957	18 December 1957	89 days	
David McNicol	Commissioner for Singapore, Brunei, Sarawak and North Borneo	18 December 1957	28 September 1960	2 years, 285 days	
John Ryan (Acting)	Commissioner for Singapore, Brunei, Sarawak and North Borneo	28 September 1960	5 November 1960	38 days	
Gordon Jockel	Commissioner for Singapore, Brunei, Sarawak and North Borneo	5 November 1960	20 January 1963	2 years, 76 days	
W. Kevin Flanagan (Acting)	Commissioner for Singapore, Brunei, Sarawak and North Borneo	20 January 1963	12 April 1963	82 days	
Richard Woolcott (Acting)	Commissioner for Singapore, Brunei, Sarawak and North Borneo	12 April 1963	15 September 1963	271 days	
Richard Woolcott (Acting)	Deputy High Commissioner to Malaysia, resident in Singapore	16 September 1963	8 January 1964	271 days	
Bill Pritchett	Deputy High Commissioner to Malaysia, resident in Singapore	8 January 1964	13 August 1965	1 year, 217 days	
High Commissioner appointed

== See also ==
- Australia–Singapore relations
- Foreign relations of Australia
