= University of Bangka Belitung =

- Universitas Bangka Belitung
- Type: Public
- Established: 12 April 2006
- Rector: Dr. Ibrahim, S.Fil., M.Si.
- Location: Pangkalpinang, Bangka Belitung, Indonesia; 2°4′11.8″S 106°4′38.7″E
- Website: ubb.ac.id

University of Bangka Belitung (Indonesian: Universitas Bangka Belitung, abbreviated UBB) is a public university in Bangka Belitung province, Indonesia. Located just outside the provincial capital of Pangkal Pinang in the Merawang subdistrict of Bangka Regency, it is the only public university (Indonesian: Perguruan Tinggi Negeri) in the province.

Formed by a merger of three higher education institutes in 2006 and formally inaugurated on 2010, the university currently hosts around 4,000 students with an annual intake of over 1,000 freshmen. It is the only university in the province which accepts students from the nationally administered SNMPTN system.

== History ==
The province of Bangka Belitung separated from South Sumatra in 2000. Initially, the province had no major state universities, although there were multiple polytechnics and Sekolah Tinggi (Higher Education Institutes). On 12 April 2006, three such institutes: Politeknik Manufaktur Timah (Polman Timah), Sekolah Tinggi Ilmu Pertanian Bangka and Sekolah Tinggi Teknik Pahlawan 12 merged into UBB in accordance with Ministry of Education Decision number 52/D/O/2006. The university started off with multiple locations in Pangkal Pinang and Sungailiat, being effectively operated by the provincial government despite formally being under the authority of the central government. Polman Timah split off from the university in 2009, later becoming the State Manufacturing Polytechnic of Bangka Belitung (Polman Babel). Bustami Rahman acted as the first rector of UBB.

The university was formally inaugurated on 22 November 2010

== Students ==
The university has over 4,000 active students in 2016. The intakes of freshmen were 1,004 from 3,133 applicants in 2014 and 850 from 3,688 applicants in 2015. Of this, management and accounting were the favorite subjects.

The university is the only one in Bangka Belitung to accept students through the national SNMPTN system, accepting 50 percent of its freshmen from the examinationless SNMPTN, 30 percent from the exam-based SBMPTN, and the rest from its own selection and testing.

In 2017, the university was rated 246th out of 3,244 HEIs in Indonesia by the Ministry of Research, Technology and Higher Education. This was an improvement from its 401st rank in 2016 and 770th in 2015.

== See also ==
- Sriwijaya University
- Bangka Island
