= Shirley Stott Despoja =

Australian journalist

Shirley Stott Despoja OAM
- Born: Shirley Margaret Stott; 1936 (age 89–90); Sydney, New South Wales, Australia
- Occupation: Journalist
- Employer: The Advertiser
- Spouse: Mario Despoja
- Children: Natasha Stott Despoja

Shirley Margaret Stott Despoja OAM (born 1936) is an Australian journalist. She was the first female journalist in the general newsroom of The Advertiser newspaper in Adelaide, and was the paper's first arts editor.

== Biography ==
Born Shirley Margaret Stott to a working-class family in Sydney, she studied at St George Girls High School before commencing, but not completing, an art's degree. Stott left university without a degree after being offered a journalism role at The Anglican, a newspaper published by the Anglican Church of Australia, working for editor Francis James.

With limited career prospects in Sydney, Stott moved to The Canberra Times, and then later was offered a position at The Advertiser in Adelaide—she was the first woman to work on general news for the paper, instead of the "women's pages". She returned to Canberra when she married, but when her marriage ended, she was asked back to The Advertiser by editor Don Riddell as the paper's first arts editor, at a time when the arts were flourishing in South Australia under the premiership of Don Dunstan.

In 1988, Stott Despoja took sick leave, and in January 1989 filed a claim for worker's compensation for work-related stress. The Australian Journalists Association took the case to the Industrial Relations Commission seeking her return to work for five days a week on full pay. The AJA's South Australian secretary told an IRC hearing that Stott Despoja's stress was caused by an incident arising over a disagreement with the editor of The Advertiser, Piers Akerman, over the placement of a column, and which the AJA alleged resulted in Akerman threatening Stott Despoja with violence. The dispute went to the Supreme Court of South Australia, where the Advertiser's appeal against the claim was dismissed. Stott Despoja retired from the paper in 1992.

In 2008, Stott Despoja returned to the media, writing a column titled "The Third Age" for the Adelaide Review.

== Awards and honours ==
Stott Despoja was inducted into the South Australian Media Awards Hall of Fame in 2013.

In the 2017 Australia Day Honours, she was awarded the Medal of the Order of Australia (OAM), for service to the print media as a journalist.

In November 2018, she was inducted into the Australian Media Hall of Fame.

== Personal life ==
In 1963, Stott interviewed Croatian migrant Mario Despoja for The Advertiser about his success on the quiz show Coles £3000 Question. They married ten months later, but divorced after twelve years.

Their daughter, Natasha Stott Despoja, was a Senator for South Australia from 1995 to 2008, and leader of the Australian Democrats from 2001 to 2002.
