= James Cumes =

Australian author, economist, former public servant and diplomat

- Born: James William Crawford Cumes; 23 August 1922; Rosewood, Queensland, Australia
- Died: 21 November 2013 (aged 91); Vienna, Austria
- Education: University of Queensland
- Occupations: Diplomat, economist, author
- Spouse: Heide Schulte von Bäuminghaus

James William Crawford Cumes (23 August 1922 – 21 November 2013) was an Australian author and economist and a former public servant and diplomat.

== Life and career ==
Cumes was born in Rosewood, Queensland in August 1922. He was educated at Wooloowin State School and Brisbane Grammar School, before matriculating to the University of Queensland. Cumes attended the London School of Economics, where he produced his PhD thesis Foreign economic policy: a study of the use of economic means to promote foreign-policy objectives since 1918, with special reference to Australia in 1951.

During World War II, Cumes was in the Australian Army, and fought on the Kokoda Track. His selection as a diplomatic staff in cadet in 1944, was reported as being believed to be the first appointment of its kind to a Queenslander.

Early in his diplomatic career, Cumes was posted in Paris, London, Bonn and Berlin. In the early 1960s, he was Charge d'Affaires (Accounting Head of Mission) in Bonn (1955–56) Brussels (1961–65) (prior to Australia having an Ambassador in Berlin). Later, Cumes was High Commissioner to Nigeria (1965–1967), Ambassador to Belgium, Luxembourg and the European Communities (1975–1977), Ambassador to Austria and Hungary (1977–1980), and Ambassador to the Netherlands (1980–1984).

In his 1988 book A Bunch of Amateurs, Cumes critiqued the performance of Australia's foreign ministers, offering an unfavourable assessment of then Minister for Foreign Affairs and Trade Bill Hayden.

In a review of Cumes' 1990 book How to Become a Millionaire Without Really Working that appeared in The Canberra Times, Peter Bowler praised Cumes for his sunny, cheerful, sensible and interesting take on money-making.

Cumes's wife, Heide Schulte von Bauminghaus Cumes was Austrian. He moved between houses in Australia, Austria, Monaco and the South of France. He died in Vienna, Austria in November 2013 at the age of 91.

== Works ==
=== Non-fiction ===
- The Indigent Rich: A Theory of General Equilibrium in a Keynesian System. Pergamon Press Australia. 1971. ISBN 0080175341.
- Inflation! A Study in Stability. Pergamon Press Australia. 1974. ISBN 0080181678.
- Their Chastity Was Not Too Rigid: Leisure Times in Early Australia. Longman Cheshire. 1979. ISBN 0582714567.
- The Reconstruction of the World Economy. Longman Cheshire. 1984. ISBN 0582714966.
- A Bunch of Amateurs: The Tragedy of Government & Administration in Australia. Sun Books. 1988. ISBN 0725105518.
- How to Become a Millionaire Without Really Working. Sun Books. 1990. ISBN 0725105933.

=== Fiction ===
- Haverleigh. Cresscourt. 1994. ISBN 0646212869.
- The Young Bug. Cresscourt. 2010. ISBN 9781452862361.

Diplomatic posts
New title Position established	Australian Chargé d'affaires in Belgium; 1962–1964	Succeeded by Ralph Harry as Ambassador
Preceded by L.E. Phillips	Australian High Commissioner to Nigeria; 1965–1967	Succeeded by H.D. White
Preceded by Allan Eastman	Australian Ambassador to Belgium; 1975–1977	Succeeded by James Plimsoll
Preceded by Bob Furlonger	Australian Ambassador to Austria; Australian Ambassador to Hungary; 1977–1980	Succeeded by Duncan Campbell
Preceded by David Fairbairn	Australian Ambassador to the Netherlands; 1980–1984	Succeeded by Geoffrey Price
