= Permanent Delegate of Australia to UNESCO =

Permanent Delegate of Australia to the United Nations Educational, Scientific and Cultural Organization

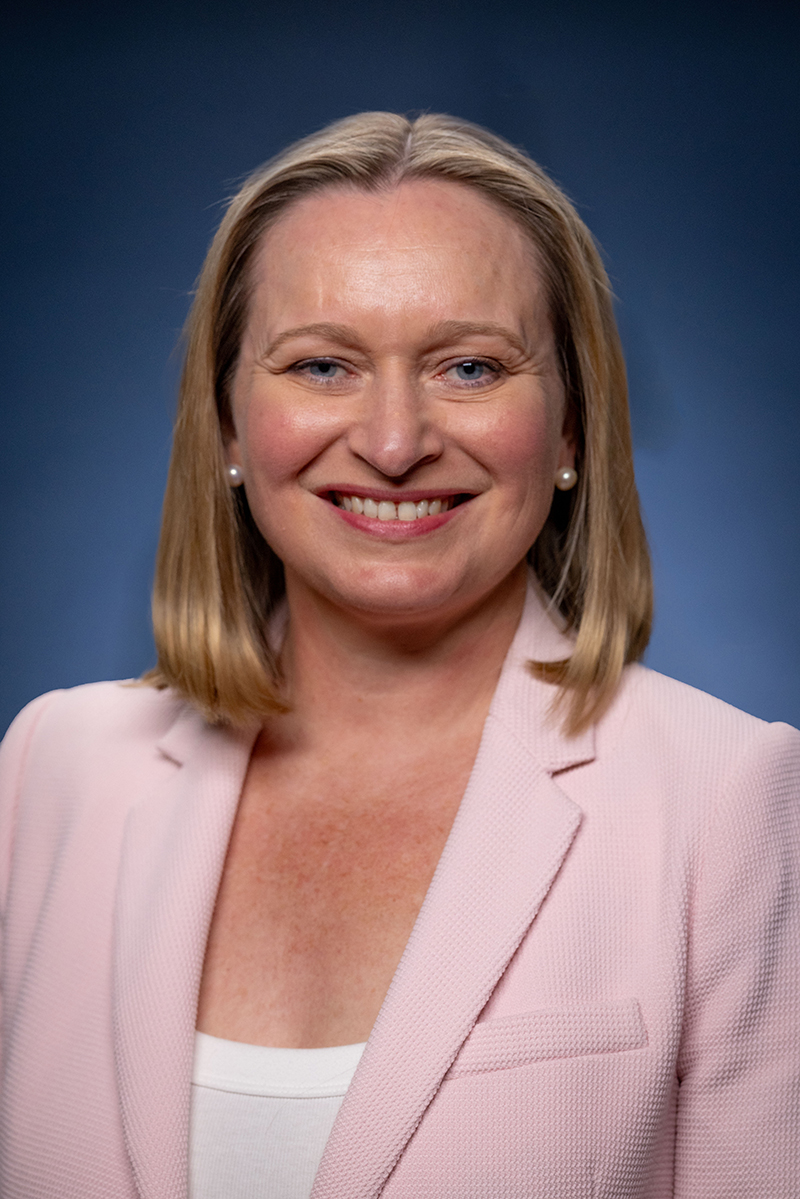
- Incumbent; Greer Alblas since 5 November 2023
- Department of Foreign Affairs and Trade
- Style: His Excellency
- Reports to: Minister for Foreign Affairs
- Nominator: Prime Minister of Australia
- Appointer: Governor General of Australia
- Inaugural holder: Dr William Gardner Davies
- Formation: 4 November 1946
- Website: Australian Permanent Delegation to UNESCO

The permanent delegate of Australia to the United Nations Educational, Scientific and Cultural Organization is an officer of the Australian Department of Foreign Affairs and Trade and the head of the delegation of the Commonwealth of Australia to the United Nations Educational, Scientific and Cultural Organization (UNESCO) in Paris, France. The position has the rank and status of an ambassador extraordinary and plenipotentiary and is but one of Australia's representatives to the United Nations and its other bodies, shared with the representatives present at the United Nations Office in Geneva, the United Nations Office in Vienna, the United Nations Office at Nairobi, and the delegation to the United Nations Agencies in Rome.

The permanent delegate, since January 2020, isMegan Anderson.

== Posting history ==
Australia has been a member of UNESCO since its establishment on 4 November 1946, with the permanent delegation based in the Australian Embassy in Paris. In 1977, Prime Minister Malcolm Fraser offered the position of Permanent Delegate to UNESCO to Sir John Kerr, who as Governor-General had been responsible for the dismissal of Gough Whitlam's government in the 1975 Australian constitutional crisis, but considerable public pressure prompted Fraser to withdraw the offer to Kerr, and offer the post to Professor Ralph Slatyer instead. At various periods of the office's history the Australian Permanent Delegate has been held by the Australian Ambassador to France. Since 1990 the Permanent Delegate has been typically held by the Deputy Head of Mission in Paris, who also serves since 2010 as Australia's non-resident Ambassador to the Republic of Chad.

== List of permanent delegates ==
#	Officeholder	Other offices	Term start date	Term end date	Time in office	Notes
1	Dr William Gardner Davies	n/a	4 November 1946	1972	25–26 years	
2	Alan Renouf	^{A}	October 1972	December 1973	1 year, 2 months	
3	Harold David Anderson	^{A}	January 1974	August 1975	1 year, 7 months	
4	James Oswin	n/a	September 1975	September 1976	1 year	
(3)	Harold David Anderson	^{A}	October 1976	August 1978	1 year, 10 months	
5	Prof. Ralph Slatyer	n/a	September 1978	September 1981	3 years	
6	Prof. Owen Harries	n/a	February 1982	August 1983	1 year, 6 months	
7	Gough Whitlam	n/a	August 1983	October 1986	3 years, 2 months	
8	Charles Mott	n/a	November 1986	January 1988	1 year, 2 months	
10	Ted Pocock	^{A}	January 1988	September 1990	2 years, 8 months	
11	John Lander	n/a	September 1990	January 1991	4 months	
12	Dr Malcolm Leader	n/a	February 1991	April 1991	2 months	
13	Dr Robert Merrillees	n/a	May 1991	August 1991	3 months	
14	Ross Burns	n/a	September 1991	September 1992	1 year	
15	Mark Pierce	n/a	September 1992	March 1994	1 year, 6 months	
16	Alan Brown	^{A}	March 1994	September 1996	2 years, 6 months	
17	Peter Shannon	n/a	October 1996	January 1999	2 years, 3 months	
18	Matthew Peek	n/a	January 1999	January 2003	4 years	
19	Jane Madden	n/a	January 2003	January 2007	4 years	
20	Sally Mansfield	^{B}	January 2007	20 April 2010	3 years, 3 months	
21	Gita Kamath	^{B}	20 April 2010	26 June 2013	3 years, 67 days	
22	George Mina	^{B}	9 September 2013	20 January 2017	3 years, 133 days	
23	Angus Mackenzie	^{B}	20 January 2017	13 January 2020	2 years, 358 days	
24	Megan Anderson	^{B}	13 January 2020	Incumbent	6 years, 237 days	

== Notes ==
^A Also Ambassador to France.
^B Also non-resident Ambassador to Chad, 2010–present.

== See also ==
- Australia and the United Nations
