= Duncan Lewis =

Australian military officer, diplomat and intelligence chief

Major General Duncan Lewis AO, DSC, CSC
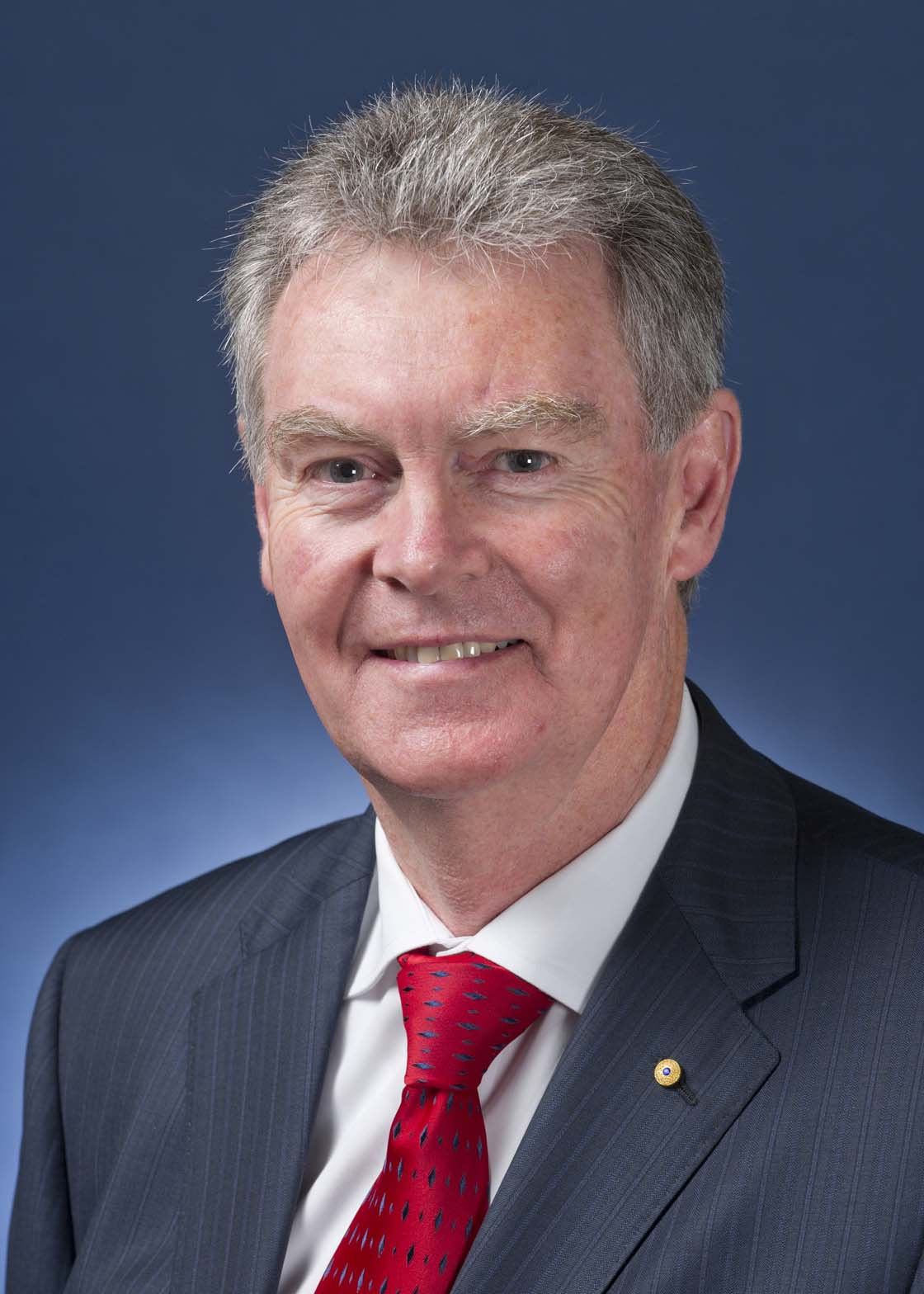

13th Director-General of Security
- In office 15 September 2014 – 15 September 2019
- Prime Minister: Tony Abbott; Malcolm Turnbull; Scott Morrison
- Preceded by: David Irvine
- Succeeded by: Mike Burgess

Australian Ambassador to Belgium, Luxembourg, European Union and NATO
- In office 18 October 2012 – 2014
- Monarch: Elizabeth II
- Preceded by: Dr Brendan Nelson
- Succeeded by: Mark Higgie

18th Secretary of the Department of Defence
- In office 5 September 2011 – 18 October 2012
- Monarch: Elizabeth II
- Preceded by: Dr Ian Watt
- Succeeded by: Dennis Richardson

1st National Security Adviser
- In office 2008–2011
- Monarch: Elizabeth II
- Preceded by: New Creation
- Succeeded by: Dr Margot McCarthy

Personal details
- Profession: Military

Military service
- Allegiance: Australia
- Branch/service: Australian Army
- Years of service: 1975–2005
- Rank: Major General
- Commands: Special Operations Command (2002–04); Sector West UNTAET (2000); Special Air Service Regiment (1990–91)
- Battles/wars: 1982 Lebanon War; International Force for East Timor; East Timor (UNTAET)
- Awards: Officer of the Order of Australia; Distinguished Service Cross; Conspicuous Service Cross

Major General Duncan Edward Lewis AO, DSC, CSC is an Australian military officer, diplomat and intelligence chief. From 2014 to 2019, he was the Director-General of Security of the Australian Security Intelligence Organisation (ASIO). Prior to that appointment, he held the post of Australian Ambassador to the Kingdom of Belgium, the Grand Duchy of Luxembourg, the European Union and the North Atlantic Treaty Organization. He is a retired Australian Army officer, and formerly Special Operations Commander Australia (2002–2004), National Security Adviser, and Secretary of the Department of Defence.

== Military career ==
Duncan Lewis graduated from the Royal Military College, Duntroon in 1975. Following graduation, he was assigned to the Royal Australian Infantry Corps. He holds a Bachelor of Arts degree from the University of New South Wales and a Graduate Diploma in Defence Studies and Management from Deakin University. He attended the British Army Staff College, Camberley and the US Army War College.

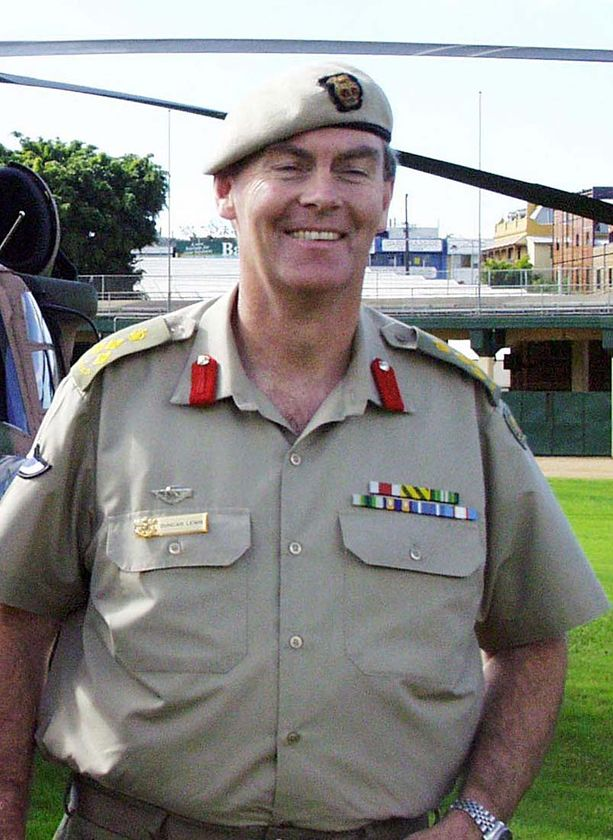
Lewis in 2001.

During his military career, Lewis served three postings with the Special Air Service Regiment, later commanding the Regiment from 1990 to 1991. For this service, Lewis was decorated with the Conspicuous Service Cross (CSC).

From 1994 to 1996, Lewis was Australian Army Attaché in Jakarta, and during the INTERFET period he was appointed the Australian Defence Force (ADF) spokesman on East Timor.

Lewis was promoted to brigadier in January 2000 and appointed Commander Sector West UNTAET in East Timor, where he commanded Australian and New Zealand forces. He was awarded the Distinguished Service Cross (DSC) for his accomplishments with the unit.

Lewis assumed his appointment as Commander Special Forces in January 2001, and was promoted to the rank of major general on 19 December 2002. In the Australia Day Honours of 2005, Lewis was appointed an Officer of the Order of Australia.

== Post-military career ==
Subsequent to his retirement from the army in 2005, Lewis joined the Australian Public Service and was appointed to the position of First Assistant Secretary of the National Security Division in the Department of the Prime Minister and Cabinet. In December 2008 he began serving as National Security Adviser to the Rudd Labor Government. On 5 August 2011 it was announced that he would be appointed the Secretary of the Australian Department of Defence, (SECDEF), effective early September. Lewis was the first former military officer to be appointed to this position.

== Diplomatic career ==
On 17 September 2012, it was announced that Lewis had been appointed Australia's ambassador to Belgium, the European Union, Luxembourg and NATO, and would leave the Department of Defence on 10 October. While newspaper reports suggested that Lewis was unhappy with the government's cuts to defence spending, he stated that "notwithstanding media reporting, I have not been forced out of my current position and I am not departing defence for any reason other than to take up this ambassadorial posting at the request of the prime minister".

== Director-General of Security ==
On 15 May 2014, Foreign Minister Julie Bishop and Attorney-General George Brandis issued a joint media release announcing that Lewis was to stand down as Ambassador to Belgium, the EU, Luxembourg and NATO, and would be appointed as Director-General of Security (the head of the Australian Security Intelligence Organisation, Australia's domestic intelligence agency) following the retirement of David Irvine in September 2014.

In this role he was one of the architects of a new "Push Back" policy to counter Chinese influence in Australia.

Lewis retired on 15 September 2019, and was replaced by Mike Burgess, the former director-general of the Australian Signals Directorate.

== Honours and awards ==

Officer of the Order of Australia (AO)	26 January 2005
Distinguished Service Cross (DSC)	11 June 2001
Conspicuous Service Cross (CSC)	14 June 1993
Australian Active Service Medal	
Australian Service Medal	
Defence Force Service Medal with four rosettes	for 35–39 years of service
Australian Defence Medal	
United Nations Medal with UNTSO ribbon	For United Nations Truce Supervision Organization
United Nations Medal with UNTAET ribbon	For United Nations Transitional Administration in East Timor

Military offices
New title	Special Operations Commander; 2002–2004	Succeeded by Major General Mike Hindmarsh
Government offices
Preceded by David Irvine	Director-General of Security; 2014–2019	Succeeded by Mike Burgess
Preceded by Dr Ian Watt	Secretary of the Department of Defence; 2011–2012	Succeeded by Dennis Richardson
New title	National Security Adviser; 2008–2011	Succeeded by Dr Margot McCarthy
Diplomatic posts
Preceded by Dr Brendan Nelson	Australian Ambassador to Belgium; 2012–2014	Succeeded by Mark Higgie
