= Peter Shannon =

Australian diplomat

- Born: Peter James Shannon; 1949 (age 76–77); Melbourne, Australia
- Education: University of Sydney
- Occupations: Australian public servant and diplomat
- Children: 1 son

Peter James Shannon (born 1949 in Melbourne, Australia) was Australian Ambassador to Austria between 2006 and 2009.

Peter holds a Bachelor of Laws and a Bachelor of Arts degree from the University of Sydney. He is married and has one son. Apart from English, he speaks French and Bislama, a Melanesian creole language.

Prior to his appointment as ambassador to Austria in 2006, Peter was Assistant Secretary, Arms Control and Counter-Proliferation Branch, Department of Foreign Affairs and Trade (2002–2005). Among the other positions Peter has held in the Australian Department of Foreign Affairs and Trade are Assistant Secretary, Americas Branch (1999–2002), Deputy Legal Adviser, Legal Branch (1991–1992), Director, Multilateral Law Section (1989–1990) and Director, Law of the Sea Section (1984–1986).

Peter has held a number of position overseas, including Permanent Delegate to UNESCO, Australian Embassy and Permanent Mission to UNESCO, Paris (1996–1999) and High Commissioner to the Republic of Vanuatu (1992–1996).

Diplomatic posts
Preceded by Alan Brown	Permanent Delegate of Australia to UNESCO; 1996–1999	Succeeded by Matthew Peek
Preceded by David Ambrose	Australian High Commissioner to Vanuatu; 1992–1996	Succeeded by Alan Edwards
Preceded by Deborah Stokes	Australian Ambassador to Austria; 2006–2009	Succeeded by Michael Potts
