= Ralph Slatyer =

Australian ecologist

Ralph Owen Slatyer AC FAA (16 April 1929 – 26 July 2012) was an Australian ecologist, and the first Chief Scientist of Australia from 1989 to 1992.

He was born in Perth, Western Australia in 1929, and was educated at Perth Modern School and Wesley College, Perth, then the University of Western Australia from which he graduated with Bachelor’s (1951) Master’s (1955) and Doctoral (1960) degrees in agricultural science.

In 1951, he joined the Division of Land Research at the Commonwealth Scientific and Industrial Research Organisation (CSIRO), becoming Associate Chief of that division in 1966. In 1967, he left the CSIRO and became a Professor of Biology at the Australian National University in Canberra. While at ANU, Slatyer travelled twice to the United States where he worked as a Visiting Professor at Duke University (1963–64) and the University of California (1973–74). In the United States, he was appointed a Senior Fellow of both the National Science Foundation and the Ford Foundation. In March 1975 he was elected a Fellow of the Royal Society

In 1977, Prime Minister Malcolm Fraser offered the position of Australia's Ambassador to UNESCO to Dr. Slatyer. Fraser had originally offered the post to Sir John Kerr, who as Governor-General had been responsible for the dismissal of Gough Whitlam's government in the 1975 Australian constitutional crisis, but considerable public pressure prompted Fraser to withdraw the offer to Kerr, and offer the post to Slatyer instead.

Slatyer returned to Australia in 1982, after four years in Paris, and resumed his professorship at ANU. Later that year, the Fraser government appointed him the chair of the Australian Science and Technology Council (ASTEC), a body set up in 1978 by Fraser as a government "think tank" on science and technology. In Slatyer's five years as chair, ASTEC was instrumental in lobbying for tax concessions for research and development in Australia, and conducting a review of the CSIRO. In 1989, Slatyer was made the first Chief Scientist of Australia, advising the Prime Minister of the day on matters relating to science and technology. He was also largely responsible during his tenure for the establishment of Cooperative Research Centres in Australia, a program designed to facilitate collaboration between business and researchers.

Slatyer was made an Officer of the Order of Australia in 1982 and in 1993 was promoted to Companion for "service to science and technology and its application to industry development".

== See also ==
- Connell–Slatyer model of ecological succession

== Ralph Slatyer Medal ==
- 2017 Mark Westoby
- 2018 Rana Munns
- 2019 Geoff McFadden
- 2020 Jane Elith
- 2021 Edward Holmes
- 2022 Belinda Medlyn
- 2023 Jennifer Martin
- 2024 Stephen Simpson

Diplomatic posts
Preceded by Harold David Anderson	Permanent Delegate of Australia to UNESCO; 1978–1981	Succeeded by Owen Harries
Government offices
New title	Chief Scientist of Australia; 1989–1992	Succeeded by Michael Pitman
