= John Rowland (diplomat) =

Australian public servant, diplomat and poet

John Rowland AO
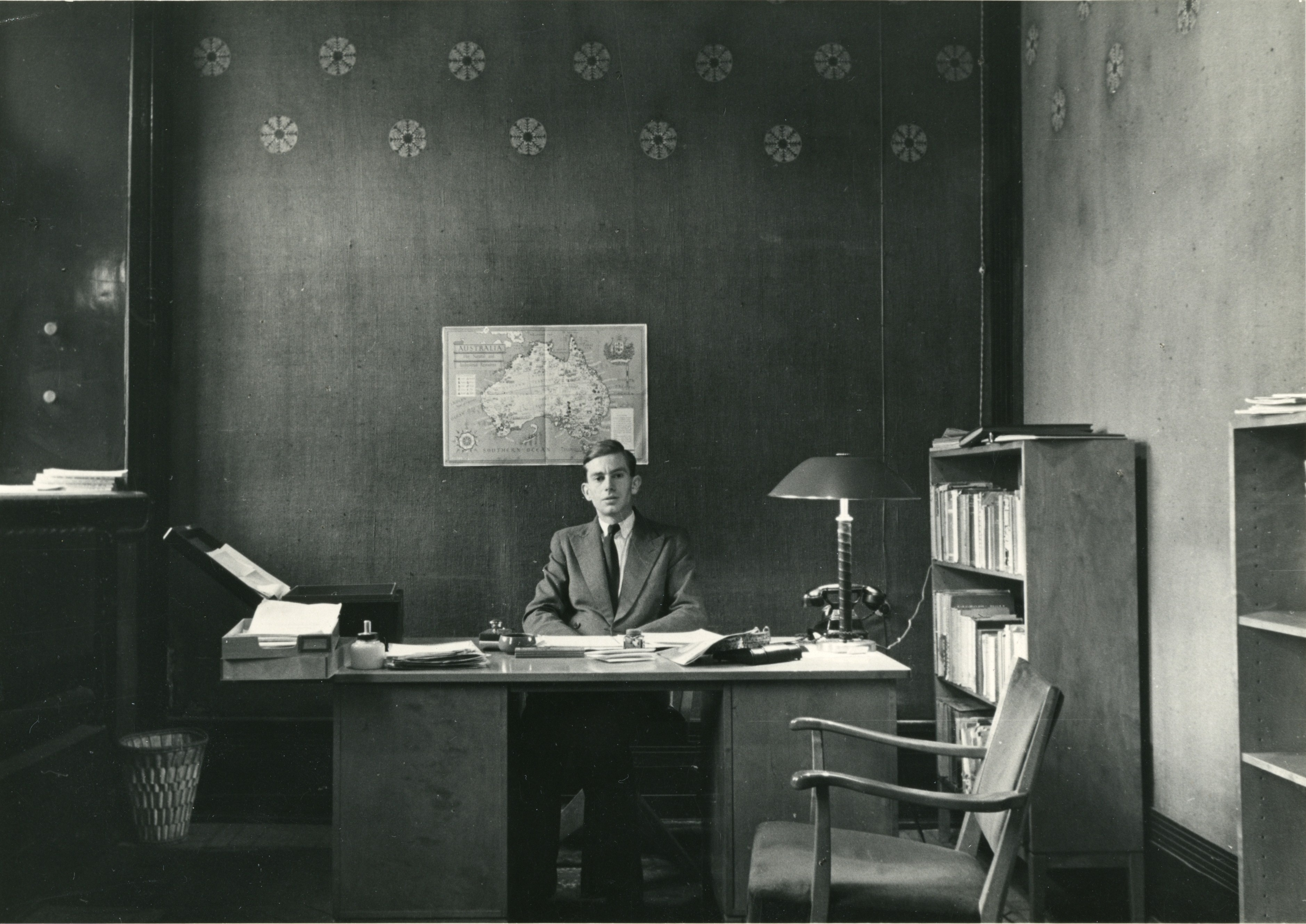
- Rowland in his office as 3rd Secretary, Australian Legation in Moscow.
- Born: John Russell Rowland; 10 February 1925; Armidale, New South Wales
- Died: 31 December 1996 (aged 71); Canberra, Australian Capital Territory
- Occupations: Public servant, diplomat, poet

John Russell Rowland AO (10 February 1925 – 31 December 1996) was an Australian public servant, diplomat and poet.

Rowland was appointed an Officer of the Order of Australia on 26 January 1981, while serving as Australian Ambassador to France.

Diplomatic posts
New title Legation established	Australian Charge d'Affaires to Vietnam; 1952	Succeeded by John Quinn as Minister
Preceded by Stewart Wolfe Jamieson	Australian Ambassador to Sweden; 1965–1966	Succeeded by Frederick Blakeney
Preceded by Stewart Wolfe Jamieson	Australian Ambassador to the Soviet Union; 1965–1968	Succeeded by Bertram Ballard
Preceded by Allan Eastman	Australian High Commissioner to Malaysia; 1969–1972	Succeeded by Alfred Parsons
Preceded by Lawrence Corkery	Australian Ambassador to Austria; Australian Ambassador to Switzerland; 1972–1974	Succeeded by Robert Furlonger
New title Position established	Australian Ambassador to Hungary; 1972–1974	Succeeded by Robert Furlonger
Preceded by Harold Anderson	Australian Ambassador to France; 1978–1982	Succeeded by Peter Curtis
