= List of ambassadors of Australia to Belgium =

Ambassador to Belgium Ambassador to Luxembourg Ambassador to the European Union Ambassador to the North Atlantic Treaty Organization

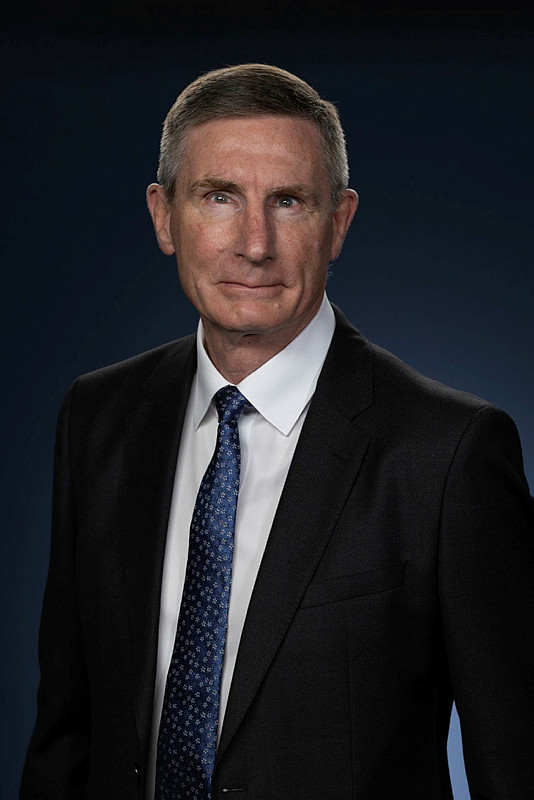
- Incumbent; Angus Campbell since March 2025
- Department of Foreign Affairs and Trade
- Style: His Excellency
- Reports to: Minister for Foreign Affairs
- Seat: Avenue Des Arts 56, Brussels
- Nominator: Prime Minister of Australia
- Appointer: Governor-General of Australia
- Inaugural holder: Edwin McCarthy (resident in the Hague); James Cumes (Chargé d'affaires)
- Formation: 1 May 1959
- Website: Australian Embassy

The ambassador of Australia to Belgium is an officer of the Australian Department of Foreign Affairs and Trade and the head of the Embassy of the Commonwealth of Australia to the Kingdom of Belgium in Brussels. The position has the rank and status of an ambassador extraordinary and plenipotentiary and holds non-resident accreditation for the Grand Duchy of Luxembourg (since 1970). The ambassador also acts as Australia's ambassador to the European Union (EU), since 1962, and ambassador to the North Atlantic Treaty Organization (NATO) since 2012. The current ambassador is Angus Campbell since March 2025.

== Posting history ==
Belgium and Australia have enjoyed official diplomatic relations since 1 May 1959 when Australia appointed Edwin McCarthy, ambassador to the Netherlands in The Hague, as the non-resident ambassador to Belgium. McCarthy also served as Australia's first ambassador to the European Communities, when he was appointed in March 1962, just before he left his post in the Netherlands and Belgium, until he retired in 1964. When McCarthy retired, Ralph Harry succeeded him as both ambassador to Belgium and the European Communities (became the EU in 1993).

On 18 September 1970, the governments of Australia and Luxembourg announced the establishment of diplomatic relations at ambassador level, with ambassador Owen Davis receiving dual accreditation while resident in Brussels.

Australia has been involved on an official level (as a 'global partner') with NATO since 2005 and the first Australian ambassador to NATO was Brendan Nelson, appointed on 20 January 2012 following the signing of a memorandum of understanding between NATO and Australia.

== List of ambassadors ==
#	Officeholder	Image	Other offices	Residency	Term start	Term end	Time in office	Notes
1	Edwin McCarthy		(subsequently appointed as Ambassador to the European Communities)	The Hague, Netherlands	1 May 1959	7 March 1962	2 years, 310 days	
2	Walter Crocker CBE			The Hague, Netherlands	13 June 1962	January 1965	2 years, 202 days	
–	James Cumes (Chargé d'affaires)			Brussels, Belgium	25 September 1961	January 1965	3 years, 98 days	
3	Ralph Harry CBE		^{A}	Brussels, Belgium	January 1965	28 January 1969	4 years, 27 days	
4	Owen Davis		^{A}	Brussels, Belgium	28 January 1969	27 January 1972	2 years, 364 days	
–	Bruce Woodberry (Chargé d'affaires)			Brussels, Belgium	27 January 1972	1972	309 days	
5	Allan Eastman CBE		^{A}	Brussels, Belgium	1972	February 1975	2–3 years	
6	James Cumes		^{A}	Brussels, Belgium	February 1975	September 1977	2 years, 7 months	
7	James Plimsoll		^{A}	Brussels, Belgium	September 1977	May 1980	2 years, 8 months	
8	Roy Fernandez		^{A}	Brussels, Belgium	May 1980	January 1983	2 years, 8 months	
9	Harold David Anderson AO, OBE		^{A}^{C}	Brussels, Belgium	January 1983	August 1987	4 years, 7 months	
10	Peter Curtis		^{A}^{C}	Brussels, Belgium	August 1987	October 1991	4 years, 2 months	
11	David Sadleir		^{A}^{C}	Brussels, Belgium	October 1991	27 April 1992	6 months	
12	Ted Pocock		^{A}^{C}	Brussels, Belgium	June 1992	January 1997	4 years, 7 months	
13	Donald Kenyon		^{A}^{C}	Brussels, Belgium	January 1997	May 2000	3 years, 4 months	
14	Joanna Hewitt		^{A}^{C}	Brussels, Belgium	May 2000	November 2003	3 years, 6 months	
15	Peter Grey		^{A}^{C}	Brussels, Belgium	November 2003	January 2007	3 years, 2 months	
16	Alan Thomas		^{A}^{C}	Brussels, Belgium	January 2007	January 2010	3 years	
17	Brendan Nelson		^{A}^{B}^{C}	Brussels, Belgium	January 2010	October 2012	2 years, 9 months	
18	Major General Duncan Lewis AO, DSC, CSC		^{A}^{B}^{C}	Brussels, Belgium	18 October 2012	September 2014	2 years	
19	Mark Higgie		^{A}^{B}^{C}	Brussels, Belgium	September 2014	6 February 2018	3 years, 5 months	
20	Justin Brown PSM		^{A}^{B}^{C}	Brussels, Belgium	6 February 2018	11 January 2021	2 years, 340 days	
–	Trudy Witbreuk (Chargé d'affaires)			Brussels, Belgium	11 January 2021	November 2021	294 days	
21	Caroline Millar		^{A}^{B}^{C}	Brussels, Belgium	November 2021	January 2025	3 years, 61 days	
22	General Angus Campbell AO		^{A}^{B}^{C}	Brussels, Belgium	March 2025	incumbent	1 year, 7 months	

=== Ambassador to the European Communities ===
#	Officeholder	Image	Term start	Term end	Time in office	Notes
(1)	Edwin McCarthy		7 March 1962	17 March 1964	2 years, 10 days	
Subsequent appointments concurrently held by the Ambassador to Belgium

=== Notes ===
^A Served concurrently as the Australian ambassador to the European Union, formerly the European Economic Community, 17 March 1964-present.
^B Served concurrently as the Australian ambassador to the North Atlantic Treaty Organization, 20 January 2012-present.
^C Served concurrently as the Australian ambassador to the Grand Duchy of Luxembourg, ????-present.

== See also ==
- Australia–European Union relations
- Foreign relations of Australia
- Foreign relations of NATO#Australia
