= Harold David Anderson =

Australian public servant and diplomat (1923–2020)

Harold David Anderson AO OBE
- Born: 6 September 1923; Semaphore, South Australia, Australia
- Died: 17 June 2020 (aged 96); Sydney, Australia
- Education: University of Adelaide (LLB)
- Occupations: Public servant, diplomat

Harold David Anderson AO OBE (6 September 1923 – 17 June 2020) was an Australian public servant and diplomat.

== Early life and career ==
Anderson was born in the North Adelaide suburb of Semaphore on 6 September 1923, the son of A. H. Anderson of Mount Gambier. He spent his early years and education in Largs Bay and later Mount Gambier, where he attended Mount Gambier High School. At Mount Gambier High School he was dux of his Intermediate year and won the Vansittart Scholarship, which entitled him to three years at St Peter's College, Adelaide. In his final year at the college he won a Bursary to study law at the University of Adelaide. At the end of his first year he gained first position in Latin, receiving the Andrew Scott Prize, and was articled to Charles Abbott KC, who later rose to be Attorney-General of South Australia.

During his second year at university, Andserson enlisted as a Private into the Australian Army on 7 October 1942. While serving in New Guinea in 1944, Anderson sat for the cadetship examination for the new Australian diplomatic service, and was the only South Australian selected, being discharged on 3 June 1944.

== Honours ==
- Officer of the Order of Australia (AO), 1980 Australia Day Honours.
- Officer of the Order of the British Empire (OBE), 1966 Queen's Birthday Honours.

Diplomatic posts
Preceded by Lawrence John Lawrey	Australian Consul in Noumea; 1951–1952	Succeeded by H. E. Holland as Vice Consul
Preceded by Brian Clarence Hill	Australian Ambassador to Vietnam; 1964–1966	Succeeded by Lew Border
Preceded by Alan Renouf	Australian Ambassador to France; 1973–1978	Succeeded by John Rowland
Preceded by Alan Renouf	Permanent Delegate of Australia to UNESCO; 1974–1975	Succeeded by James Oswin
Preceded by James Oswin	Permanent Delegate of Australia to UNESCO; 1976–1978	Succeeded by Ralph Slatyer
Preceded by Ralph Harry	Permanent Representative of Australia to the United Nations; 1978–1982	Succeeded by Richard Woolcott
Preceded by Roy Fernandez	Australian Ambassador to Belgium and Luxembourg; Australian Ambassador to the European Communities; 1983–1986	Succeeded by Peter Curtis
