= Justin Brown (diplomat) =

Australian diplomat

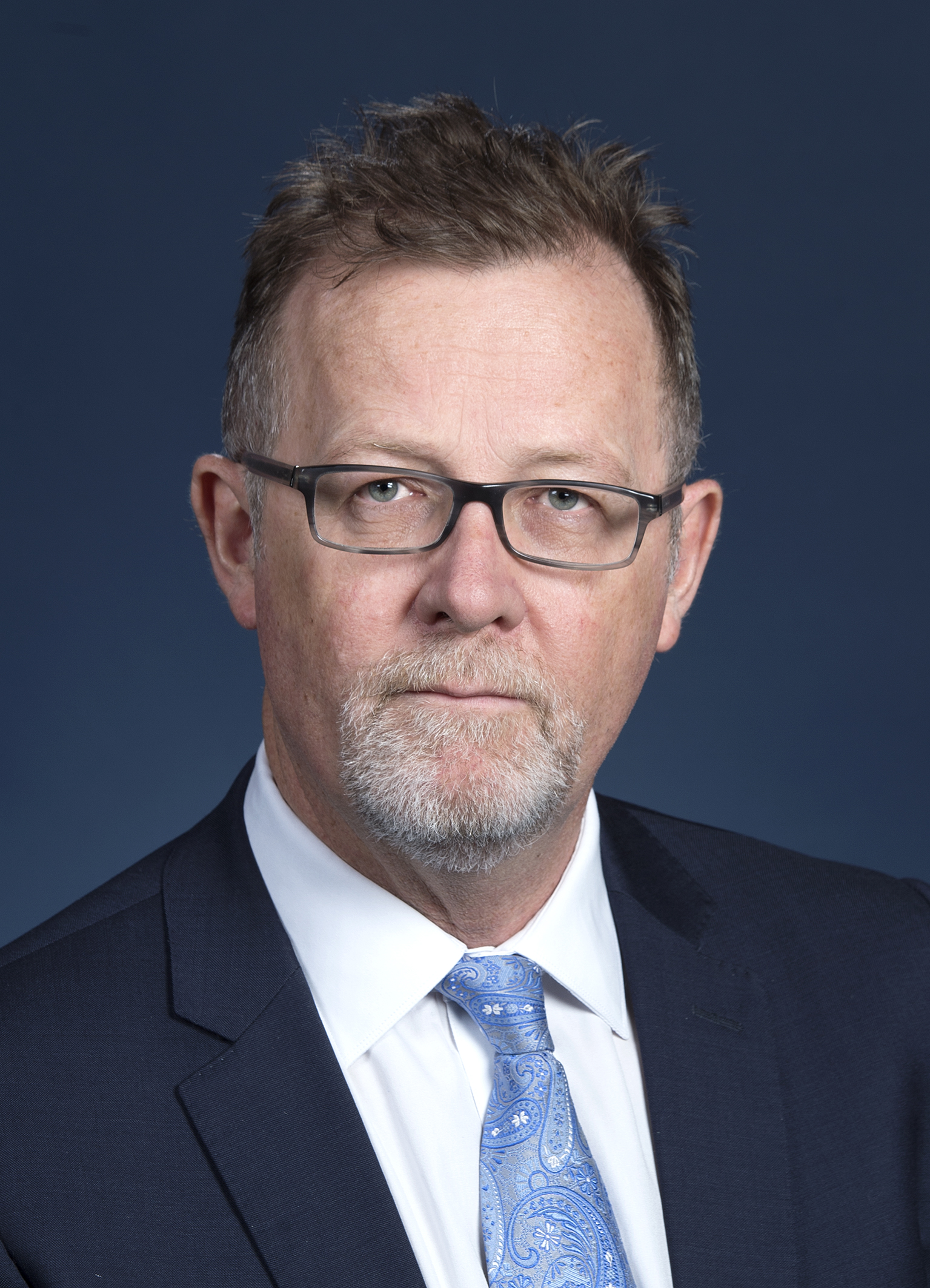

Justin Hugh Brown PSM is a senior Australian public servant and former officer with the Australian Department of Foreign Affairs and Trade. Brown is currently a non-executive director of Wine Australia, a statutory corporation that promotes and regulates the Australian wine industry.

== Diplomatic career ==
First educated at Marist College Canberra, Brown earned a Bachelor of Economics from the University of New England.

From 2004 to 2006, Brown held the post of Ambassador for the Environment and Chief Negotiator on Climate Change.

Brown's posts have included First Assistant Secretary, Office of Trade Negotiations; First Assistant Secretary, Consular and Crisis Management Division; High Commissioner to Canada (2008-2011); and Deputy Head of Mission, Australian Embassy, Brussels (1999–2001).

In July 2015, Brown was awarded the Public Service Medal (PSM) for "outstanding public service in leading the Department of Foreign Affairs and Trade's Canberra-based crisis response to the downing of Malaysia Airlines flight MH17."

He held the post of Ambassador to Belgium, Luxembourg, the European Union and NATO from February 2018 to January 2021.

Diplomatic posts
Preceded by Christopher Langman	Australian Ambassador for the Environment; 2004–2006	Succeeded by Jan Adams
Preceded by William Fisher	Australian High Commissioner to Canada; 2008–2011	Succeeded by Louise Hand
Preceded by Mark Higgie	Australian Ambassador to Belgium, Luxembourg, the EU, and NATO; 2018–2021	Succeeded by Trudy Witbreuk as Chargé d'affaires
