= Mark Higgie =

Australian diplomat and columnist (born 1957)

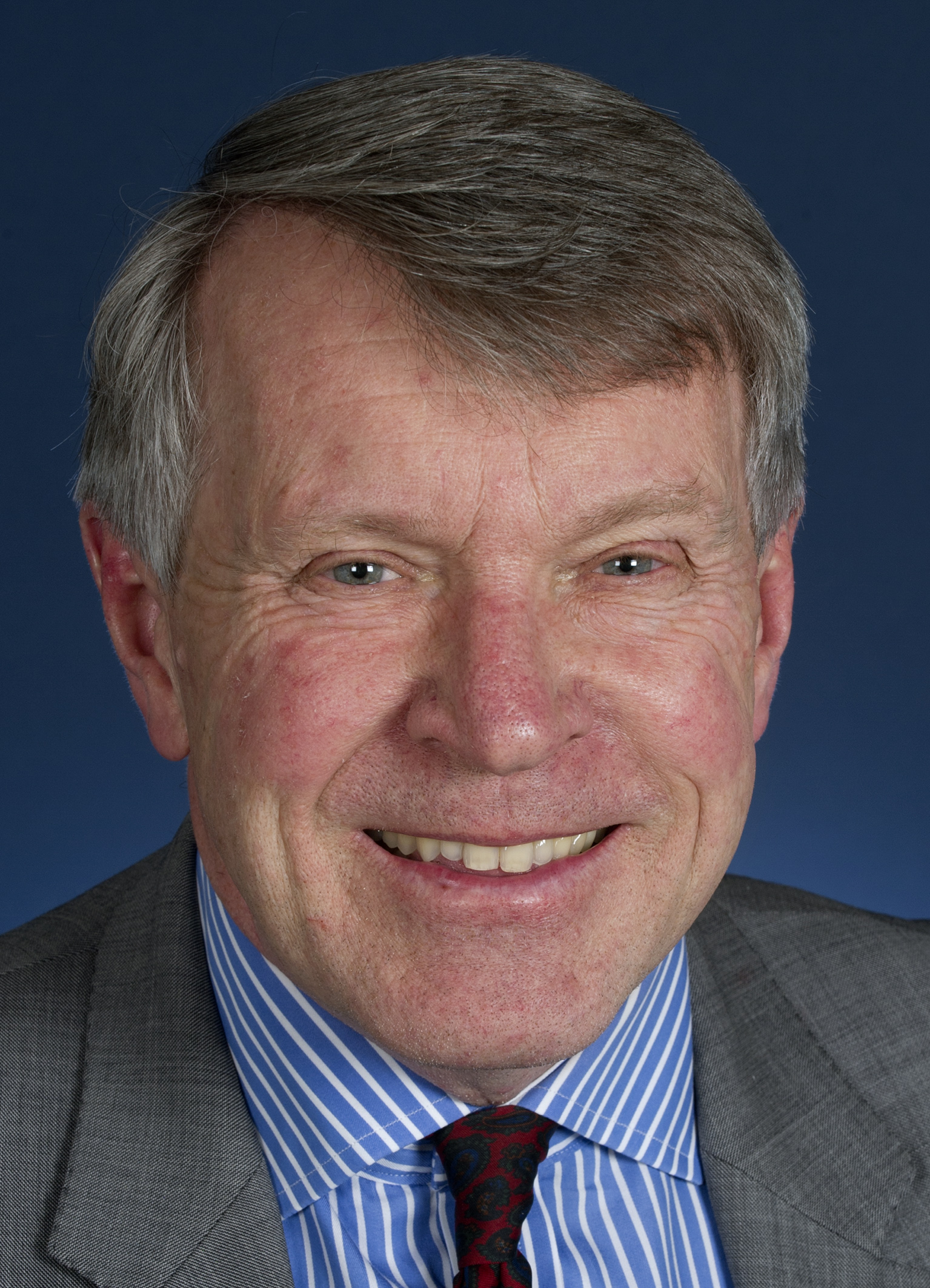

Australian Ambassador to the European Union and NATO Australian Ambassador to Belgium Australian Ambassador to Luxembourg
- In office 2014–2017
- Preceded by: Duncan Lewis
- Succeeded by: Justin Brown

International Advisor to the Hon. Tony Abbott MP
- In office 2010–2014
- Succeeded by: Craig MacLachlan

Personal details
- Born: 26 July 1957 (age 69) Canberra, Australia
- Spouse(s): Zoë Colvin, daughter of MI6 agent, ambassador and writer John Horace Ragnar Colvin and Anne Manifold, later Lady Synnot, widow of the late Admiral Sir Anthony Synnot, Australia’s Chief of the Defence Force 1979–82
- Children: Anna, Lucinda
- Parent(s): William and Jean Higgie
- Education: Australian National University

Mark William Christopher Higgie (born 26 July 1957) is a former Australian diplomat, political advisor, and intelligence analyst. Higgie is now a regular columnist on European affairs, mainly in the Australian edition of The Spectator. He was the Australian Ambassador to the European Union and NATO, Belgium, and Luxembourg between 2014 and 2017. He previously served as international advisor to the Hon Tony Abbott MP, both when Abbott was Leader of the Opposition (2010–2013) and when he was Prime Minister (2013–2014).

== Background and career ==
Higgie graduated from the Australian National University in 1981 with a BA (Hons) in Russian and Political Science; and in 1987 was awarded a PhD from the same institution for a thesis on Soviet and East European politics. While doing research for his PhD in 1982, he undertook an internship at Radio Free Europe/Radio Liberty at its then Munich headquarters.

Higgie joined the Department of Foreign Affairs and initially served in Belgrade (1985–87) and Vienna (1992–95). In 1988–89 he also served as policy advisor to shadow foreign minister, John Spender QC.

He served as Australia’s ambassador in Budapest 1998–2001. At the conclusion of his posting then Hungarian president Ferenc Mádl awarded him the Commander's Cross of the Order of Merit of the Republic of Hungary, the country's second-highest honour, for services to Hungary-Australia relations.

Higgie served 2006–09 as the representative in London of the Office of National Assessments, the Australian Government’s intelligence assessment agency on international affairs. In this role, he was the Australian representative on the UK Joint Intelligence Committee.

He was international advisor to the Hon Tony Abbott MP, both when Abbott was Leader of the Opposition (2010–2013) and when he was Prime Minister (2013–2014). Together with the relevant shadow ministers and their staff, he coordinated the Liberal-National coalition's international, defence and immigration policies (including foreign affairs, trade, veterans' affairs and ethnic affairs) at its campaign headquarters in Melbourne at both the 2010 and 2013 federal elections.

In the 2013 national power survey of the Financial Review, Higgie was listed fourth on its Defence Strategies sectoral list. Greg Sheridan, foreign editor at The Australian, to whom Higgie has been seen as close, described Higgie as a 'highly regarded professional' with good connections among Coalition politicians.

He was Australia’s ambassador in Brussels (to the EU, NATO, Belgium and Luxembourg) between 2014 and 2017. Since concluding his posting in Brussels, he has been a regular columnist on international affairs issues for the Australian edition of The Spectator, which designated him as its Europe Correspondent in 2019. He has also contributed articles to the British edition of The Spectator, The Australian, The Telegraph, Hungarian Review, the Royal United Services Institute (London) newsletter and XpatLoop Budapest. Higgie was Senior Fellow at the Budapest think-tank the Danube Institute 2018-21. He resigned in protest over what he saw as its mismanagement.

In 2019 he wrote an article published in The Australian revealing his discovery that he was partly of aboriginal ancestry on his father’s side

Diplomatic posts
Preceded by Patrick Robertson	Australian Ambassador to Hungary; 1998–2001	Succeeded by Leo Cruise
Preceded by Duncan Lewis	Australian Ambassador to the European Union and NATO; Australian Ambassador to Belgium; Australian Ambassador to Luxembourg; 2014–2017	Succeeded by Justin Brown
