= Superior Person's Book of Words =

Dictionary book by Peter Bowler

- Author: Peter Bowler
- Language: English
- Genre: Non-fiction
- Published: 1979, David R. Godine, Publisher
- Media type: Print
- Pages: 118 pages
- ISBN: 0-87923-556-X
- Followed by: What a Way to Go!

The Superior Person's Book of Words is a non-fiction book by Australian lexicographer Peter Bowler. It was first published in Australia as The Superior Person's Little Book of Words in 1979 and subsequently re-published under its current title. The work collects several bizarre, obsolete and supposedly very useful words from the English language. Bowler followed the book up with five companion books, including the 2009 work The Completely Superior Person's Book of Words which included his original book and two others. Godine has reported that the work is one of their bestselling titles and sells between "25,000 to 30,000" copies a year.
