= Allan Eastman (diplomat) =

Australian public servant and diplomat (1912–1987)

Allan Eastman CBE
- Born: Allan James Eastman; 21 January 1912
- Died: 2 November 1987 (aged 75); Drummoyne, New South Wales
- Occupations: Public servant, diplomat
- Children: David Eastman

Allan James Eastman CBE (21 January 1912 – 2 November 1987) was an Australian public servant and diplomat.

== Life and career ==
In 1938, Eastman became a captain in the Army Legal Department. He was seconded to the 1st AIF in 1941. He was promoted to Lieutenant-Colonel in January 1943.

In 1946, Eastman joined the Commonwealth Public Service in the Department of External Affairs. His first appointment was as Australian Consul to Siam, where he negotiated the Australian–Thai Peace Treaty.

Eastman was appointed the Australian High Commissioner to Ceylon (later Sri Lanka) in 1956.

In 1962, Eastman was appointed Senior External Affairs representative in London. From London, Eastman went to Malaysia to take up an appointment as the Australian High Commissioner to Malaysia from 1965 to 1969. During his posting, Malaysia signed up to the ASEAN Declaration and Australia pledged to provide defence support for the Malaysia-Singapore area.

Returning to Canberra, Eastman was appointed head of the Department of Foreign Affairs defence division. His posting to Brussels as Ambassador to Belgium was announced in November 1971.

Whilst Australian Ambassador to Mexico (1975–1977), Eastman oversaw an office of nine staff, including Penelope Wensley who was threatened with kidnapping during her posting.

Eastman retired from public service in 1977. He died on 2 November 1987.

== Awards ==
Eastman was made an Officer of the Order of the British Empire (OBE) in 1961 for distinguished public service, while serving as the Australian external affairs representative at the London High Commission. He was promoted to Commander of the Order (CBE) in 1965.

Diplomatic posts
| Preceded by Roden Cutler | Australian High Commissioner to Ceylon; 1956–1958 | Succeeded by Charles Kevin |
| Preceded by Tom Critchley | Australian High Commissioner to Malaysia; 1965–1969 | Succeeded by John Rowland |
| Preceded by Owen Davis | Australian Ambassador to Belgium; 1972–1974 | Succeeded by James Cumes |
| Preceded by Owen Davis | Australian Ambassador to Mexico; 1975–1977 | Succeeded by Kenneth Rogers |
