= Clare Birgin =

Australian diplomat

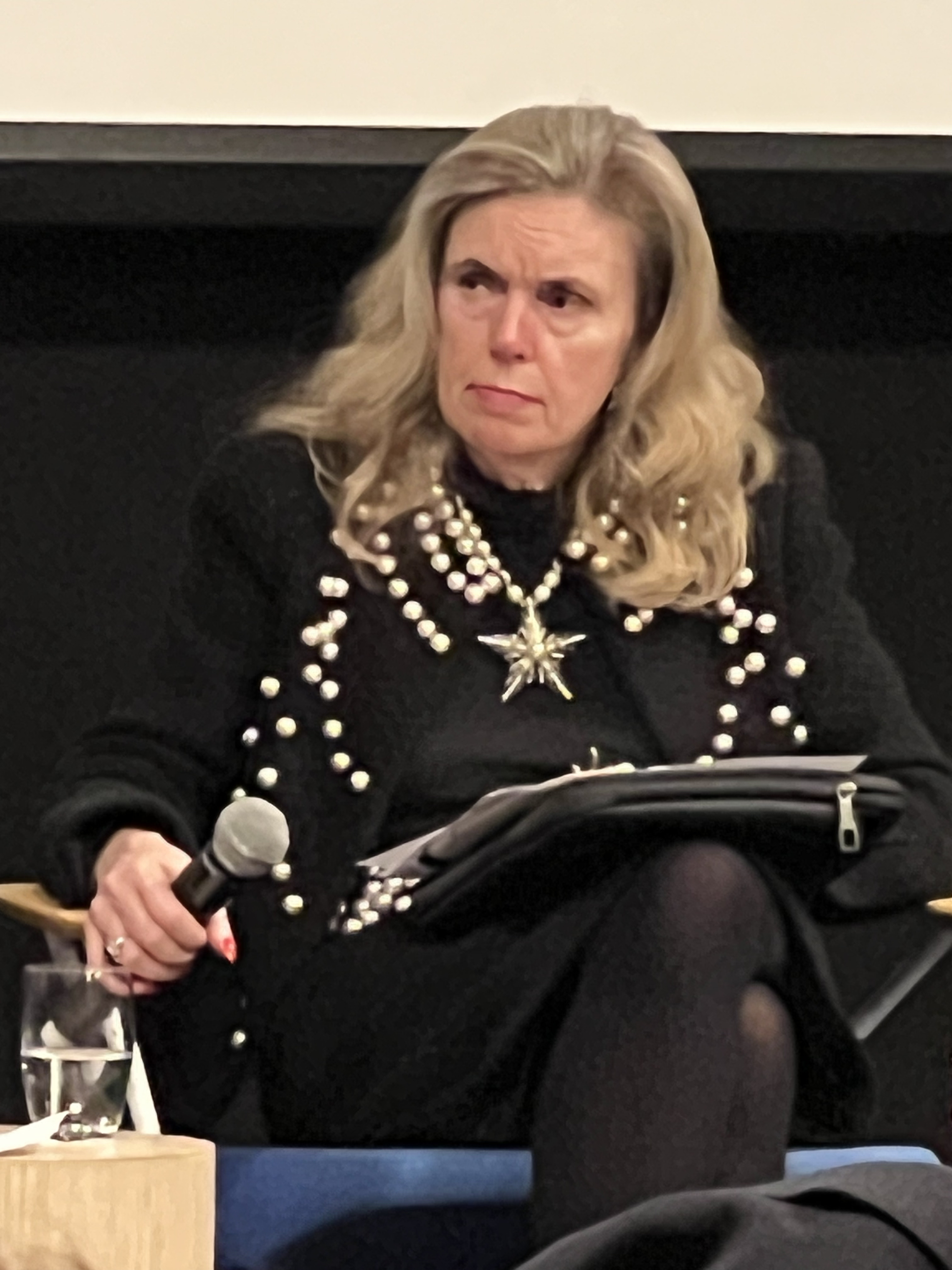
Clare Birgin at the Australian National University

Clare Birgin is an Australian diplomat who was the Ambassador to Serbia from May 2007 until June 2010. She had concurrent accreditation to Montenegro, Macedonia and Romania. Birgin was also Ambassador to Hungary from 2004 until 2007.

Damir Dokić was sentenced to jail time after threatening Birgin with a hand grenade “if she didn't stop negative articles about him from being published in Australia.”

Birgin earned a Bachelor of Arts degree and a master's degree in international law from the Australian National University, where she was a Visiting Fellow.

== Publications ==
- Ignore the Polish election result at your peril
