= Jelena Dokic =

Australian tennis player (born 1983)

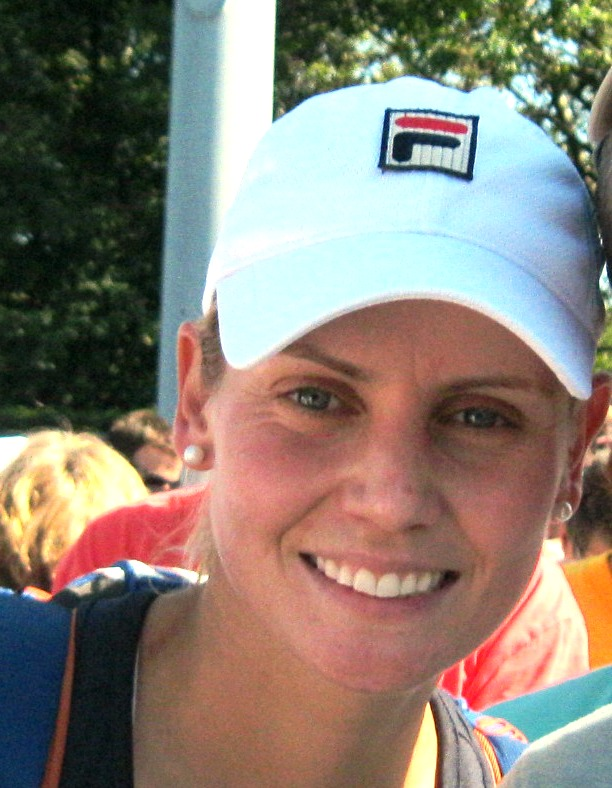
- Dokic at the 2011 US Open
- Country (sports): Australia (1998–2000, 2006–2014); FR Yugoslavia (2001–2003); Serbia and Montenegro (2003–2005)
- Born: 12 April 1983 (age 43) Osijek, SR Croatia, Yugoslavia
- Height: 1.76 m (5 ft 9 in)
- Turned pro: 1998
- Retired: 2014
- Plays: Right-handed (two-handed backhand)
- Prize money: $4,481,044

Singles
- Career record: 348–221
- Career titles: 6
- Highest ranking: No. 4 (19 August 2002)

Grand Slam singles results
- Australian Open: QF (2009)
- French Open: QF (2002)
- Wimbledon: SF (2000)
- US Open: 4R (2000, 2001)

Other tournaments
- Tour Finals: QF (2001, 2002)
- Olympic Games: SF – 4th (2000)

Doubles
- Career record: 118–100
- Career titles: 4
- Highest ranking: No. 10 (4 February 2002)

Grand Slam doubles results
- Australian Open: 3R (1999, 2000)
- French Open: F (2001)
- Wimbledon: 3R (1999, 2000, 2001)
- US Open: 2R (2000, 2001)

Other doubles tournaments
- Olympic Games: 2R (2000)

Mixed doubles
- Career record: 4–9

Grand Slam mixed doubles results
- Australian Open: QF (2001)
- French Open: 2R (2000)
- Wimbledon: 3R (2001)
- US Open: 1R (2001, 2003)

Team competitions
- Fed Cup: Australia (total 14–3); Serbia and Montenegro (2–0)
- Hopman Cup: Australia; W (1999)

Jelena Dokic (Serbian: Јелена Докић, romanized: Jelena Dokić; pronounced [jɛ̌lɛna dokit͡ɕ]; born 12 April 1983) is an Australian broadcaster, tennis analyst, former professional player and public speaker. Her highest ranking as a tennis player was world No. 4, in August 2002. She won WTA Tour events on all surfaces during her career.

In the 1999 Wimbledon Championships the 16-year-old Dokic achieved one of the biggest upsets in tennis history, beating Martina Hingis 6–2, 6–0 in the first round. This remains the only time the women's world No. 1 has ever lost to a qualifier at Wimbledon. Dokic went on to reach the quarterfinals of that competition, only her second Grand Slam championship.

Dokic rapidly ascended through the rankings after her Wimbledon breakthrough, but her time in the world elite was beset by off-court struggles. Her relationship with her outspoken father and coach Damir Dokić, on whose advice she switched allegiance to the Federal Republic of Yugoslavia in November 2000, was the subject of much media speculation over many years. She switched back to Australia in 2005. Dokic made a serious return to tennis in 2008 and finished 2009 back in the WTA top 100, but thereafter struggled badly with form and injuries, and ceased playing professionally in 2014.

She wrote of physical and mental abuse by her father in her 2017 autobiography Unbreakable. In November 2024, a feature-length documentary film based on the book, titled Unbreakable: The Jelena Dokic Story, was released in Australian cinemas.

== Early life and education ==
Jelena Dokić was born on 12 April 1983 in Osijek, SR Croatia, SFR Yugoslavia, to a Serb father, Damir Dokić, and a Croat mother, Ljiljana (née Podnar). She has a younger brother, Savo, eight years her junior.

Her family lived in Osijek until June 1991 when, due to the instability of the breakup of Yugoslavia, they settled in Sombor, Serbia, for a short time before emigrating to Australia in 1994 when Dokić was 11 years of age. She has spoken of growing up in poverty, and at one time (after the family left Croatia for Serbia) they lived in a shed infested with rats.

Upon arrival in Australia they lived in Fairfield, a suburb of Sydney, where Dokić (later Dokic) attended Fairfield Public School without knowing any English when she started, and then Fairfield High School.

From the time she first picked up a tennis racket as a young child, through becoming a tennis champion as a teenager, and then through most of her career, her father was violent and abusive towards her, taking all of her winnings, and beating her frequently.

== Tennis career ==
=== Juniors ===
In 1998, she won the US Open girls' singles title and the French Open doubles with Kim Clijsters, ending the season ranked world No. 1 in the junior singles rankings and world No. 7 in doubles. She was an Australian Institute of Sport scholarship holder.

=== 1999–2000: Major breakthrough ===
Dokic started the year by teaming up with Mark Philippoussis to win the Hopman Cup title. Until 2016, it was Australia's lone victory at the event. She then received a wildcard into the Australian Open, losing to world No. 1, Martina Hingis, in two sets. At Wimbledon, Dokic had her breakthrough: As a qualifier, she caused an upset, defeating world No. 1 Hingis in the first round, in straight sets. Ranked No. 129 at the time, she was the lowest-ranked player to have defeated the top seed in a Grand Slam tournament in the Open era. She also defeated ninth-seeded Mary Pierce in straight sets, before losing in three to Alexandra Stevenson in the quarterfinals. Dokic also reached her first WTA Tour doubles final with Amanda Coetzer in Tokyo. During 1999, she jumped 298 spots, finishing the year at world No. 43.

Dokic was defeated in the first round of the 2000 Australian Open by Rita Kuti-Kis of Hungary. After the match, Dokic said, "I lost to a player who has never been a player and, I guess, probably never will be." During the spring clay court season, Dokic reached the quarterfinals of the Tier I events in Hilton Head, South Carolina and Rome (upsetting Venus Williams en route), as well as earning Fed Cup victories over Kim Clijsters, Anna Kournikova and Sandrine Testud, respectively. However, Dokic lost in the second round at the French Open.

Her successes at Wimbledon continued; she advanced to the semifinals where she lost to Lindsay Davenport. She reached the fourth round of the US Open and lost to Serena Williams, after holding two set points in the first-set tiebreaker. At the 2000 Summer Olympics, representing Australia, she lost to Monica Seles in the bronze medal match. In doubles, she teamed with Rennae Stubbs, but lost in the second round. Dokic finished the year at world No. 26.

=== 2001: First career titles and top 10 ===
Beginning with the Australian Open, she began playing for Yugoslavia. Her father, Damir, claimed irregularities in the draw after her first-round loss to Lindsay Davenport and was banned from the tournament due to abusive behaviour. Damir later said, "I think the draw is fixed just for her". This resulted in intense media speculation then and over the years.

After the Australian Open, her family moved to the United States. In May, she won her first singles title in the Rome Masters, defeating Amélie Mauresmo in the final 7–6, 6–1. Later that year in doubles, she teamed with Conchita Martínez to reach the final of the French Open, where they were defeated by Virginia Ruano Pascual and Paola Suárez, in straight sets.

Later that year in singles, she reached five finals, winning two titles, in Tokyo (defeating former world No. 1 Arantxa Sánchez Vicario), and the Kremlin Cup (defeating Elena Dementieva). She also won her second title in doubles in Linz, with Nadia Petrova, and qualified for the WTA Tour Championships in singles, reaching the quarterfinals. She finished the year as the world No. 8. The Yugoslav Olympic Committee declared her its Athlete of the Year for 2001.

=== 2002: Highest ranking ===
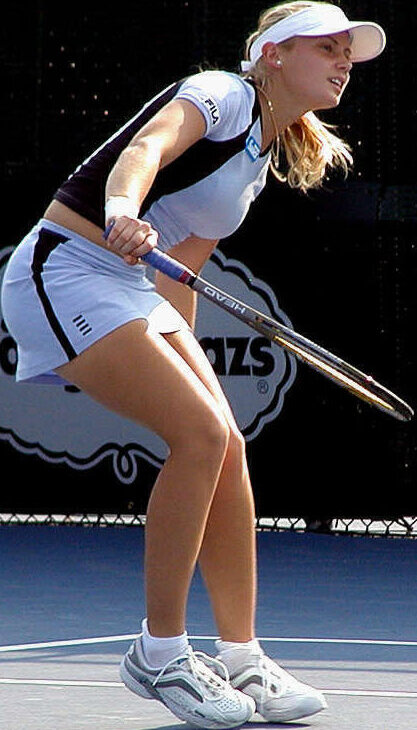
Dokic in 2002

Dokic reached the final of the Open Gaz de France, where she was forced to hand a walkover to Venus Williams, after her first victory over Monica Seles a day earlier, due to a right thigh strain suffered in her win. In April, she won her fourth singles title in Sarasota, Florida, defeating Tatiana Panova in the final. At the Hamburg event, Dokic collected a straight-set win over Justine Henin, before having to retire in the semifinals. Dokic was unable to defend her Italian Open title, losing to 11th-seeded Anastasia Myskina in the third round.

In Strasbourg, she reached her fifth final, losing to Silvia Farina Elia. At the French Open, she was defeated by top-seeded Jennifer Capriati in the quarterfinals. Dokic then won her fifth career singles title in Birmingham, defeating Myskina in the final in two sets. She then lost in the fourth round at Wimbledon to Daniela Hantuchová.

After Wimbledon, Dokic reached the final of the Acura Classic in San Diego, scoring her first win over Jennifer Capriati in a three-set match. In the final, she was defeated by Venus Williams. She also reached the semifinals of Los Angeles, losing to Chanda Rubin, and Montreal, notching a victory over Martina Hingis, before retiring hurt against Capriati. Despite a loss to Elena Bovina in the second round of the US Open, Dokic reached her career-high singles ranking of world No. 4. She then reached the semifinals in Salvador, Bahia and Tokyo. Dokic again qualified for the WTA Tour Championships, losing in the quarterfinals to Serena Williams. She finished the year ranked world No. 9 in singles.

In doubles, Dokic won titles in Sarasota (with Elena Likhovtseva), Los Angeles (with Kim Clijsters) and Linz (with Nadia Petrova), as well as reaching the finals of Moscow and Zürich (both with Petrova). This success resulted in her career-high doubles ranking of world No. 10.

=== 2003–2005: Out of top 10 ===
In 2003, Dokic hired Borna Bikić from Croatia to replace her father as her trainer whom she accused of "wrecking her career", after several outbursts and volatile behavior at tennis tournaments. By this time, she had also been estranged from her family due to a brief relationship with Brazilian racing driver Enrique Bernoldi. She played 30 events, reaching one final, one semifinal and seven quarterfinals. At Wimbledon she narrowly lost in the third round 4–6, 4–6 to a 16-year-old Maria Sharapova. At Zürich, she beat the then-world No. 1 player Clijsters, but lost to Henin in the final. She and Petrova also reached a final in doubles in Rome. She played in the 2004 Fed Cup for the Serbia and Montenegro team and achieved two wins.

In mid-2004, Dokic returned to her family in Serbia to attempt a reconciliation. In November 2005, after a turbulent period of 4–5 months during which she cancelled all her tennis commitments and not even her family knew her whereabouts, she returned to Australia proclaiming, "I am an Australian, I feel like an Australian and I want to play for Australia again." She later identified her switch to Yugoslavia as the biggest regret of her career, saying that her father was subjecting her to extreme physical and mental abuse at the time and he made the decision for him.

=== 2006–2008: ITF Circuit ===
Representing Australia for the first time in five years, Dokic received a wildcard into the Auckland Open in Auckland, but lost her first-round match to Julia Schruff, hitting 51 unforced errors and 28 double faults. Dokic then earned a wildcard berth at the Australian Open after winning the wildcard playoff. She held a match point on her opponent Virginie Razzano's serve and hit a forehand winner that caught the line, only to have the umpire rule the ball out. She went on to lose the match, hitting over 70 unforced errors.

Later that year, Dokic played in the qualifying tournament for Wimbledon, where she received a wildcard but suffered a three-set loss to Alexandra Stevenson. Under the guidance of new coach Nikola Pilić, after over three months away from the tour due to injury, Dokic qualified for a $10k tournament and reached the semifinals of the main draw before losing to Astrid Besser. In November 2006, Dokic denied reports from her father that she had been kidnapped by her boyfriend, Tin Bikić.

In her interview, she said she would not play in the 2007 Australian Open because she was not ready and her aim was to get back into the top 30. Shortly after, Dokic left the Nikola Pilić Tennis Academy. She was due to sign a contract to be in the academy for a year, but instead returned to Borna Bikić, her coach. Dokic said she was not satisfied with the contract Pilić's academy offered her. After withdrawing from several ITF events in the early 2007, Dokic lost in the early rounds of two $10k events in Rome. She then continued to withdraw from events. Back in Australia on 17 October, Dokic released a statement through Tennis Australia that she would use their facilities in an attempt to make a comeback.

Dokic said she had not felt "within herself" to play during 2007 but was now ready to put in the hard work necessary to get back to the top. She cited Mary Pierce, Jennifer Capriati and Andre Agassi as inspirational figures for her goal of reaching the highest echelons of tennis once more. Dokic's long-awaited return to tennis came during the Australian Open Wildcard Playoff, where she was hoping to earn a place in the first major of 2008. She emerged from the round-robin stage with a 3–0 record before retiring in her quarterfinal match while trailing 6–3, 3–1 due to a thigh strain.

Dokic received a wildcard for the qualifications of the 2008 Hobart International and won four matches to reach the second round of the main draw, where she retired in her match against Flavia Pennetta due to an ankle injury. She received a qualifying wildcard into the Australian Open but lost in the second round. After a three-month layoff, Dokic finally returned to action at the Morocco Open in Fes, where she qualified but lost in the first round to Gréta Arn. She then entered the following week in a $25k tournament in Florence, Italy, and won saving two match points against Mirjana Lučić in the quarterfinals, and defeating seventh-seeded Lucie Hradecká in the final. A week later, Dokic continued her winning streak by capturing the $25k tournament in Caserta, Italy.

She was then offered a wildcard to the Internationaux de Strasbourg, where she lost in the first round to Swiss Timea Bacsinszky. In July, she won her third $25k in Darmstadt. Following a period with less successful results, Dokic took a temporary break, withdrawing from all ITF tournaments during September and early October. She returned in mid-October after being awarded a wildcard for qualifying into the Tier II Linz tournament. There, she won her first round match against Petra Martić before losing to world No. 63, Jill Craybas, in the second round.

In December, Dokic again played the Australian Open Wildcard Playoff event, where she emerged from the round-robin stage with a 2–1 record, subsequently winning through to the final playoff, in which she had a tough match against Monika Wejnert, coming out a victor and earning a wildcard into the 2009 Australian Open. After the match, Dokic said:

"Some players just don't have it mentally to go through all that hard work, which I find is not a problem with me."

During the play-offs, Dokic said in a press conference that she had ambitions to play in the Fed Cup for Australia in 2009. Subsequently, she was awarded a main-draw entry into the inaugural Brisbane International event.

=== 2009: Comeback ===
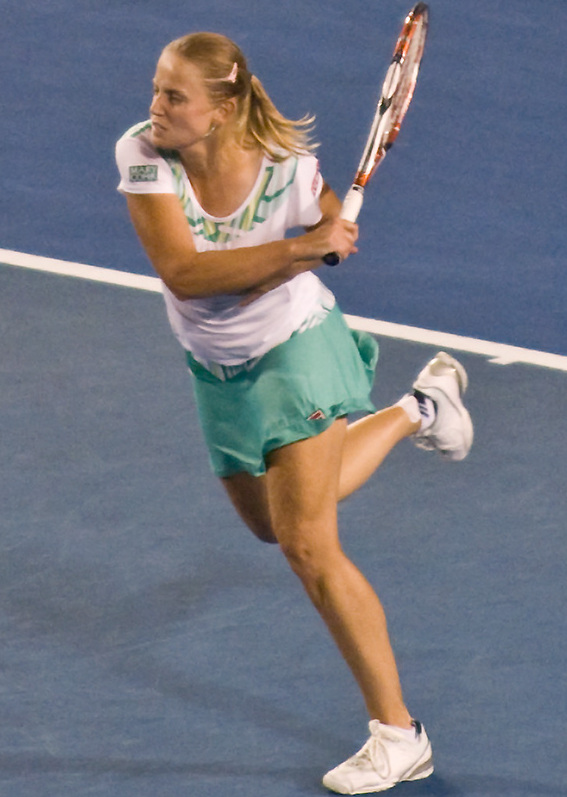
At 2009 Australian Open

Dokic was knocked out of the Brisbane International by Amélie Mauresmo in straight sets in the first round. Dokic was up 5–3 in the first set before Mauresmo came back to win the tiebreak 11–9. In the second set, Dokic was down 3–5 but rallied to lead 6–5 before Mauresmo won the set in a tiebreak, 7–5. Dokic then received a qualification wildcard into the Hobart International but withdrew before her first match because of an Achilles tendon injury.

Dokic won her first round match at the Australian Open against Tamira Paszek of Austria. It was her first major match win since 2003. She then defeated world No. 17, Anna Chakvetadze, in the second round, 6–4, 6–7, 6–3 and 11th-seeded Caroline Wozniacki in the third round. This was the first time she had reached the fourth round of the Australian Open. Dokic then advanced to the quarterfinals of a Grand Slam tournament for the first time since 2002, after defeating 29th-seeded Alisa Kleybanova. Dokic's run ended when she was defeated by Dinara Safina in a three-sets quarterfinal. Because of this tournament, her ranking improved to world No. 91.

In an interview after her first-round win at the Australian Open, Dokic said that she still had no contact with her father, but was building relationships again with her mother and younger brother, and that she had been dating her boyfriend, Tin Bikić, for five years.

In Fed Cup, Australia was in the Fed Cup Asia/Oceania Zone Group I. Dokic defeated all three of her opponents in straight sets, Lee Jin-a of Korea, Suchanun Viratprasert of Thailand, and Diane Hollands of New Zealand. Australia advanced into the World Group II Playoffs in April. At the Cellular South Cup in Memphis, Tennessee, she won two qualifying matches to reach the main draw, where she lost in the first round to top-seeded Wozniacki 1–6, 2–6 in 48 minutes.

Her next tournament was the Indian Wells Open, a Premier Mandatory event, where she lost to American Jill Craybas in the first round. Dokic received a wildcard for the main draw of another Premier Mandatory event, the Miami Open in Key Biscayne. She defeated Romanian Edina Gallovits in the first round before losing to 13th-seeded Wozniacki in the second round. Dokic withdrew from the MPS Group Championships in Ponte Vedra Beach, Florida and the Family Circle Cup in Charleston, citing fatigue. Dokic then won the second singles rubber of Australia's World Group II Fed Cup quarterfinal tie against Switzerland in Mildura, Australia.

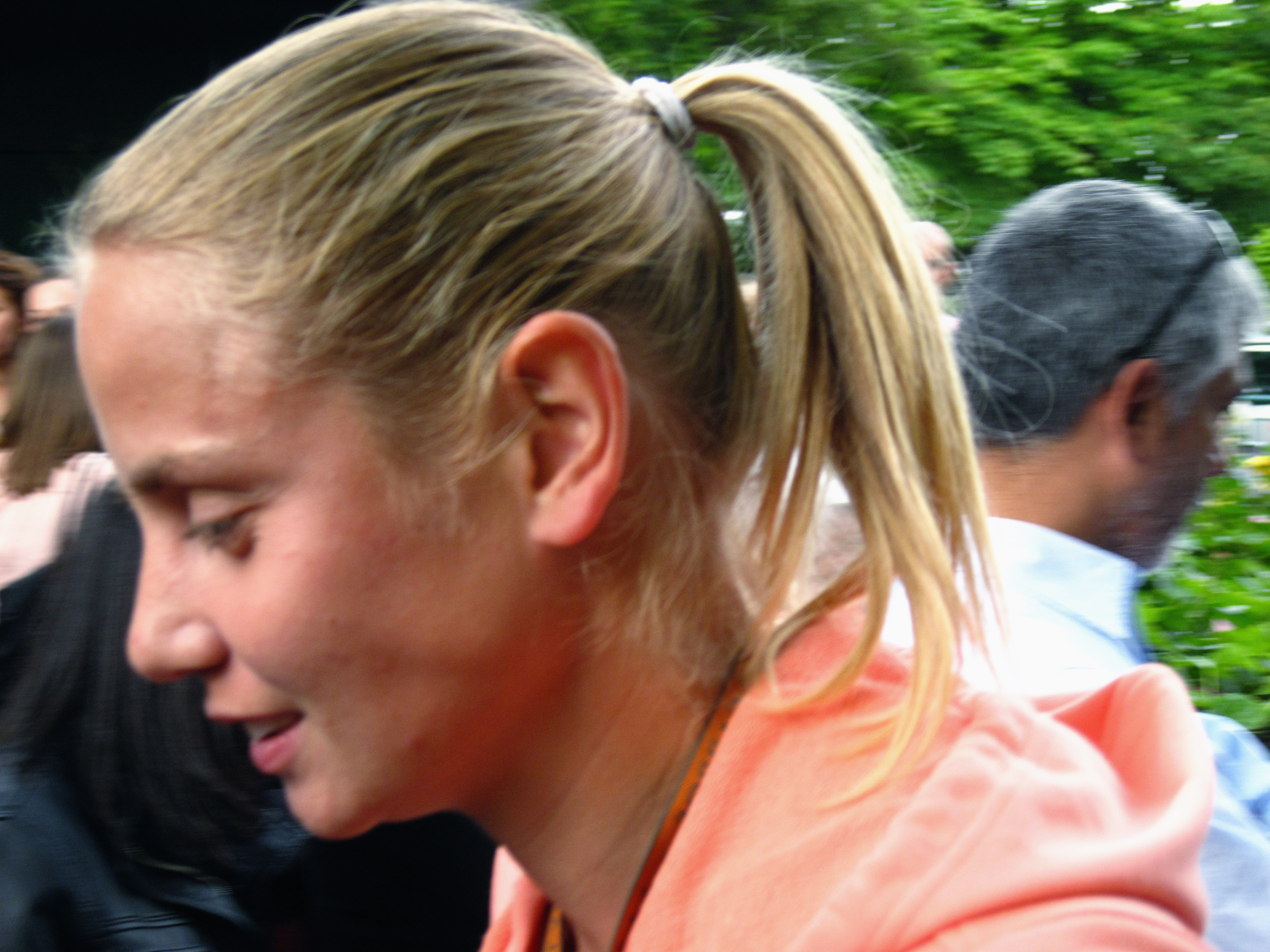
Dokic at the 2009 French Open

Originally scheduled to play in the Italian Open in early May, she instead appeared as the No. 1 seed in the $100k event at Bucharest but lost in the semifinals to Andrea Petkovic. She then participated on the Warsaw Open, which was the last WTA Premier event before the French Open but lost in the first round to qualifier Raluca Olaru. She then played the French Open. In the first round, she beat Karolina Šprem, her first win in the French Open since 2003. In the second round she played world No. 4, Elena Dementieva. She led by 6–2, 4–3, before retiring due to a lower back injury. She also played doubles, partnering with Alisa Kleybanova, they defeated Petra Cetkovská and Carla Suárez Navarro in the first round. They were scheduled to play world number ones in doubles, Cara Black and Liezel Huber, in the second round but withdrew because of the injury.

Her injury forced her to miss Wimbledon warming up tournaments, but Dokic still appeared at Wimbledon. She lost against qualifier Tatjana Malek in the first round 6–3, 5–7, 2–6, after serving 16 double faults. Dokic was then diagnosed as suffering from glandular fever and had to withdraw from the Swedish Open in Båstad. She was ordered to rest for another fortnight and planned to get back on court on hard-court tournaments leading up to US Open. However, she did not make any appearance at the 2009 US Open Series.

She competed at the US Open but lost to Kirsten Flipkens in the first round. The week later, she played at the $100k event at Biella where she is seeded fourth, but lost to Petra Martić in the second round. She then played at another $100k tournament at Sofia but again lost in the second round to Andrea Hlaváčková in straight sets. Two weeks later she played at another $100k+H tournament at Athens, Greece. She won the tournament by beating Eleni Daniilidou 6–2, 6–1 in the final. This was her first title in 2009 and her most significant title since 2002.

Dokic then travelled to France to play ITF level tournaments, started with Joué-lès-Tours, a $50k event where she was the top seed. She advanced to her second final of the year but lost to Sofia Arvidsson by 2–6, 6–7. She then played at Poitiers, a $100k event, as the fourth seed. She made it to her third consecutive final and faced Sofia Arvidsson again. This time, she won 6–4, 6–4, clinching her second title in 2009. Dokic finished 2009 ranked world No. 56, her best showing since 2004.

=== 2010: Out of top 100 ===
Prior to the first Grand Slam event, Dokic participated in two Australian Open warm-up tournaments. She opened the season at the Brisbane International, where she lost to former world No. 1, Ana Ivanovic, in three sets in the first round. She then travelled to Hobart to play the Hobart International where she defeated Elena Baltacha in the first round but lost to second seed, Shahar Pe'er, in a disappointing second-round match, 2–6, 2–6 with Dokic making over 40 unforced errors. She was seen breaking down on court as well as crying after this match. As well as the singles, Dokic also participated in the doubles event at this tournament, trying to start a new combination with compatriot Alicia Molik. However, the pair lost in the first round to Chan Yung-jan and Monica Niculescu.

She then travelled to Melbourne to compete at the Australian Open. Dokic was defeated there in the first round by 27th seed Alisa Kleybanova. The loss caused her rank to drop to world No. 96. She also played doubles, partnering with Petra Kvitová, but the pair lost in the first round.

Dokic withdrew from the Pattaya Open in Thailand and Malaysian Open due to a mysterious illness. She lost in the qualifying rounds of Monterrey Open and the first round of the Indian Wells Open. She was then offered a wildcard into Miami Open but declined it due to another injury. Jelena then continued to withdraw from WTA Tour events in Marbella and Barcelona, Spain, and Fes, Morocco, still troubled by injuries.

Her clay season started in May, where she played at a $50k tournament at Prague where she was seeded third. She lost in the quarterfinals to Corinna Dentoni. Her next tournament was the French Open, but she lost in the first round to 24th seed Lucie Šafářová. She then travelled to Rome to participate at a $50k tournament but lost to Anna Tatishvili in the first round. The following week, she participated at a $100k tournament at Marseille, France. She reached the quarterfinals but lost to eventual champion Klára Zakopalová.

She then played the qualification for Wimbledon but lost in the second round to Julie Ditty in three sets, after committing 24 double faults, including five in the fifth game of the final set. Dokic then withdrew from a $100k tournament in Cuneo, Italy, with a wrist injury. The following week she withdrew from another one in Biarritz, France. She competed at a $50k tournament in Contrexéville, France winning the singles over Olivia Sanchez, thus claiming her first title in 2010. Partnering with Sharon Fichman, she lost in the doubles finals. She then won her second straight title, in Bucharest at the $75k Ruxandra Dragomir Open defeating Zuzana Ondrášková in the final. With this win, Dokic was back in the top 100, ranked 96. The next week, she participated at a $75k tournament in Vancouver, where she won her third straight title after defeating Virginie Razzano in a two-sets final, capping a 15-match winning streak. Dokic has the most $50k or more titles in the ITF Circuit.

Though she returned to the top 100 after winning three tournaments and 15 matches in a row, Dokic lost in the first round qualifying draw of the US Open to Laura Robson. Jelena then travelled to Asia to participate at two ITF tournaments but had disappointing result as she both lost in the first round of the 100k+H tournament in Ningbo, China, and 100k+H tournament in Tokyo, Japan. She then travelled back to Europe and participated at a 50k tournament in Joué-lès-Tours. She double-bageled Eirini Georgatou in the first round and she beat Karolína Plíšková in the second round. In the quarterfinals, Jelena beat Elitsa Kostova. Dokic was beaten in the semifinal by Vesna Manasieva.

Dokic won her first-round match in the $50k tournament in Saint-Raphael, France by beating Eva Birnerová. Jelena retired in her second-round match against Urszula Radwańska leading 7–5, 0–2, with a suspected thigh injury. Dokic revealed that she had an elbow injury in the beginning of the year (possibly the reason she withdrew in tournaments such as Miami). Also, she explained that she did not take part in a lot of tournaments in the second half of the year to recover from injury and to deal with her coaching situations.

In December, Dokic participated in the Australian Open Wildcard Playoff tournament. In the round-robin stage, she won all three of her matches and a spot in the semifinal round where she defeated Alicia Molik. However, Dokic lost to Olivia Rogowska in the final. Despite missing out on a wildcard spot, the organisers awarded her a wildcard for the Australian Open main draw. Dokic finished the year ranked 138.

=== 2011: First WTA Tour trophy after eight years ===
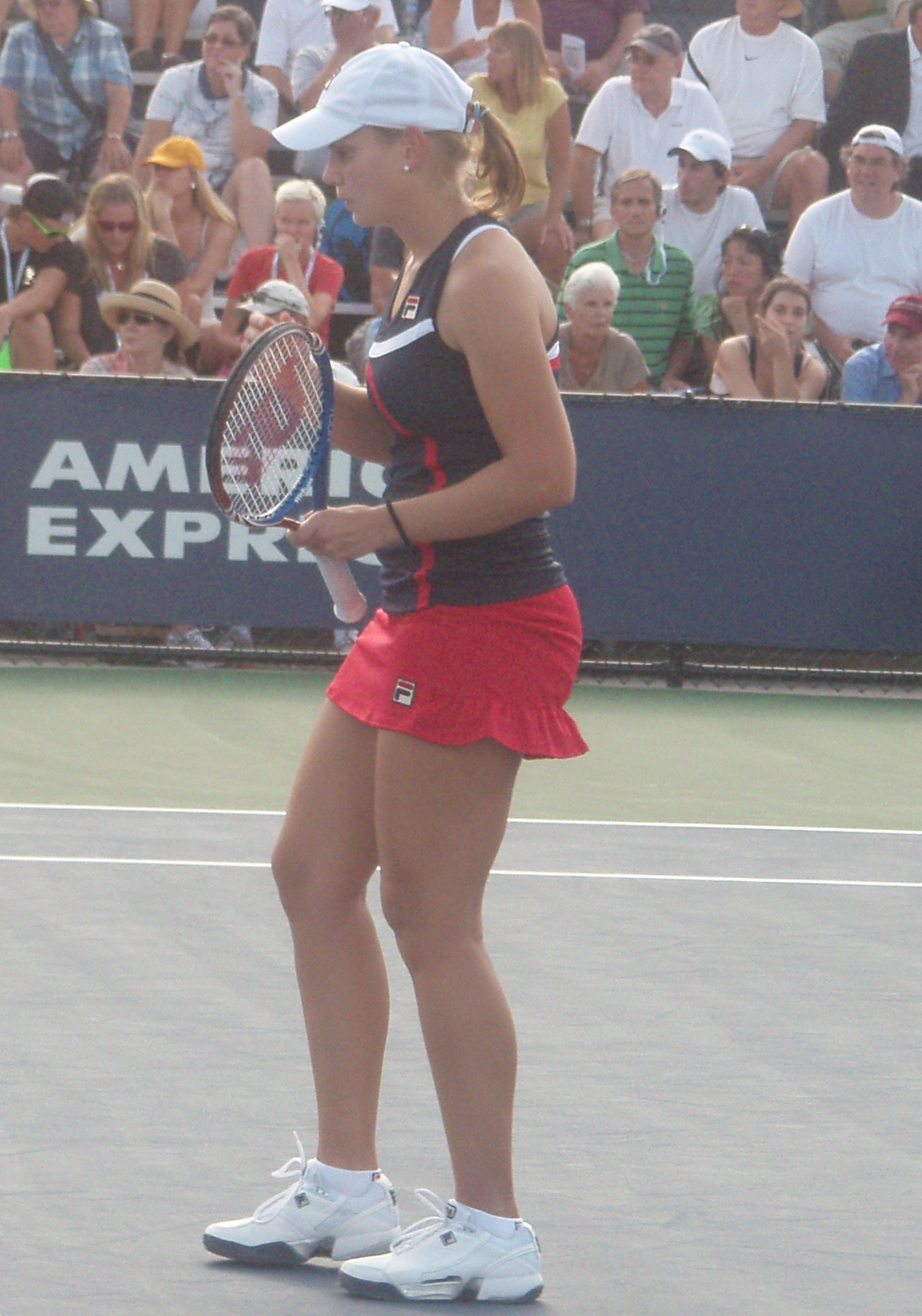
Jelena Dokic at 2011 US Open

Dokic started her 2011 campaign by receiving three main-draw wildcards during the Australian summer, in Brisbane, Sydney and Melbourne. She comfortably won her first match in Brisbane against qualifier Anastasia Pivovarova but then lost to in-form, eventual finalist, Andrea Petkovic. After the match Dokic cited a stomach virus as the reason to the loss. In Sydney, she lost to Svetlana Kuznetsova in the first round.

In the Australian Open, Dokic easily dispatched Zuzana Ondrášková in the first round, but fell to Barbora Záhlavová-Strýcová in the second round. She also received a wildcard to participate in doubles, partnering with Sally Peers where they faced 16th seed, Timea Bacsinszky and Tathiana Garbin, in the first round. The pair lost in two sets.

At the Open GdF Suez in Paris, Dokic won all three qualifying matches for a spot in the main draw. Dokic then upset the 30th-ranked Lucie Šafářová, a 2010 finalist, for a spot in the second round. This victory was Dokic's first victory over a top-30 player since the 2009 Australian Open. She backed up her strong performance by defeating fifth seed and former doubles partner, Nadia Petrova in straight sets in the second round to advance to her first WTA quarterfinals appearance since the 2009 Australian Open. However, her run ended after Kim Clijsters beat her despite leading 3–0 in the first set, in a victory that brought Clijsters back to world No. 1. Nevertheless, Dokic's strong performance in the Premier event brought Dokic back to the top 100, at No. 91, and a main-draw wildcard of the Dubai Tennis Championships.

In the first round of Dubai, Dokic, hindered by illness, committed 41 unforced errors and 11 double faults to give victory to an in-form Flavia Pennetta losing. Following the loss, Dokic travelled to Doha to participate at the qualifying draw of Qatar Open. She comfortably won her first match but lost in the second match to fellow Australian, Jarmila Groth.

Dokic traveled to Kuala Lumpur where she scored her biggest win of the year by upsetting world No. 5, 2010 French Open champion, and top seed Francesca Schiavone in the first round, despite serving 15 double faults. This is her first win against a top-5 player since 2003, where she defeated then world number one player Kim Clijsters in Zurich. She then defeated Japan's Kurumi Nara in the second round, to advance to her second WTA quarterfinal this year. She reinforced this win by upsetting an in-form Bojana Jovanovski, the eighth seed, in straight sets. This victory saw Dokic advance to her first WTA semifinals since Pan Pacific Open in Japan in February 2004. Dokic faced a resurgent Michaëlla Krajicek of the Netherlands, who had defeated defending champion Alisa Kleybanova in the second round and prevailed to advance to her first WTA Tour singles final since the Zürich Open in October 2003. She concluded the tournament by beating Lucie Šafářová in the final, after saving two championships points in the second set tiebreak and being down 1–3 in the final set. This was Dokic's first career title under Australian flag and first since June 2002 where she won the Birmingham Classic. Her strong performance rose her ranking to world No. 61.

Originally electing to strategically skip the qualifying stage of Indian Wells to compete in a $100k tournament in the Bahamas, Dokic then withdrew from the $100k tournament. Dokic's next tournament was Miami where she had to play the qualifying round. Dokic won both of her matches against Tatjana Malek and Christina McHale to advance to the main draw, where she fell to a resurgent former world No. 1, Dinara Safina in two sets.

Dokic then started her clay season campaign by participating at Charleston, where she was upset in the first round by qualifier Anna Tatishvili, in three close sets. She then participated at Fes as the sixth seed but was forced to withdraw due to a viral illness. This also subsequently forced Dokic to withdraw from Estoril and missed both Madrid and Rome. She finalised her preparation for the French Open by playing at Strasbourg. She defeated Fes finalist Simona Halep in the first round in just 48 minutes, dropping only one point on serve in the second set. Dokic then fell to resurgent former child prodigy Mirjana Lučić. Despite this, Dokic's victory over Halep will ensure that she will reach the top 60 for the first time since 2009, with a year-high ranking of 59. In Roland Garros, Dokic lost to Vera Dushevina in the first round. She also participated in doubles partnering with Melanie Oudin but the pair lost in the first round to Alexandra Dulgheru and Magdaléna Rybáriková. In spite of an early exit from the clay Grand Slam, Dokic's ranking rose to No. 57.

After Roland Garros, Dokic participated at Copenhagen as the seventh seed but lost to a qualifier, Galina Voskoboeva, in the first round. Dokic then rebounded with a victory over Alla Kudryavtseva at 's-Hertogenbosch in two sets. She then upset fourth seed Flavia Pennetta in the second round to avenge her loss in Dubai, ensuring her third quarterfinal appearance of the year. In the quarterfinals, Dokic faced Swedish player Johanna Larsson whom she dispatched, setting up a semifinal berth against Romina Oprandi, who had upset world No. 2, Kim Clijsters, in the second round. She won the match 6–4, 2–0 (ret.) to ensure her second final appearance of the year against Roberta Vinci. Dokic was edged out in three close sets. Despite the loss, Dokic's run to the final ensured that for the first time since October 2004, she will be ranked in the top 50—at world No. 45.

Dokic's next tournament was Wimbledon where she lost to sixth seed Francesca Schiavone in the first round. despite being a favourite to upset. She also participated in doubles, partnering with Bojana Jovanovski but fell to third seed Liezel Huber and Lisa Raymond in the first round.

Dokic's next scheduled tournament was Budapest, but she decided to withdraw to recover from a hamstring injury. The same injury forced her to withdraw from the tournament in Bad Gastein and Baku as well. Dokic then participated in Washington as the fourth seed, but her lack of match play saw her fall in the first round to China's Zhang Shuai. She played in San Diego, but was defeated in three tight sets to Ayumi Morita with her 15 double faults being highlighted as the main concern for the match. Since then, Dokic did not play any further matches due to a shoulder injury. Despite this setback, Dokic took part in the main draw of the US Open. She reached the second round but lost to Jelena Janković, in straight sets.

On 27 September, Dokic went back to Belgrade, Serbia, and reconciled with her father. Dokic then participated in the qualifying round of Linz in October but retired, after losing the first set 3–6 in the first qualifying match to Evgeniya Rodina due to the shoulder injury that had been bothering her since July. This turned out to be Dokic's last match in 2011.

=== 2012–2014: Struggles with form, injury ===
Dokic began her 2012 season in Auckland where she lost in the first round to Mona Barthel. Then, she received a wildcard to compete in Sydney. In the first round, she defeated fellow Australian Isabella Holland to set up a clash against eight seeded Marion Bartoli in the second round where she lost in two sets. She also played doubles with Sofia Arvidsson where she reached the quarterfinals before losing to Raquel Kops-Jones and Abigail Spears. One week later, Dokic took part in the Australian Open. She began her campaign by defeating Anna Chakvetadze in the first round. In the second round, she met Bartoli for the second time in two weeks. Dokic's nine double faults (some at crucial points) cost her and she lost in straight sets. She also participated in doubles and mixed doubles competitions, partnering with Kateryna Bondarenko and Paul Hanley, respectively, but lost in the first rounds of both.

Dokic travelled to Bogotá where she was the fourth seed, but lost to Paula Ormaechea. In Monterrey, she lost to eventual runner up Alexandra Cadanțu. As the defending champion and seventh seed at the Malaysian Open in Kuala Lumpur, Dokic started her campaign successfully, defeating Kristina Mladenovic but then lost against fellow Australian Olivia Rogowska, 6–3, 4–6, 6–7. Since she had failed to defend her points, she dropped out of the top 100.

She then suffered three consecutive first round losses at Indian Wells, Miami and Charleston, losing to Gisela Dulko, Ekaterina Makarova and Galina Voskoboeva. It was later revealed, Dokic had suffered from a continuing right wrist injury since the beginning of the year, explaining her poor results and retirements. Dokic was set to return to tournament play at the ITF Challenger tour in September, but was forced to cancel all commitments due to continuing problems with her wrist. In November 2012, it was announced Dokic had undergone wrist surgery and would miss the Australian summer of events.

In May 2013, Dokic said in an interview that she was training for a comeback attempt at smaller tournaments using an injury protected ranking. Again, in October 2013, she said that after a wrist operation she was training with Todd Woodbridge to try for a wildcard entry into the 2014 Australian Open. Dokic entered the Australian Open Wildcard Playoff in December 2013 but lost in the first round to Jarmila Gajdošová. She received a wildcard to play alongside Storm Sanders at the doubles competition; in the first round, the team lost to Magdaléna Rybáriková/Stefanie Vögele in what was Dokic's final appearance in a rating event.

== Post-retirement career ==
After keeping a low profile for a few years following her retirement, Dokic steadily increased her work in the Australian tennis media in the late 2010s, and became a well-known face in tennis coverage in Australia.

She was engaged by Tennis Australia as a coach in 2014, and was pictured coaching rising Australian star Daria Gavrilova at a training camp in Italy in June 2014. She also wrote for Australian Tennis Magazine in 2014.

During the 2013-2014 Australian summer, Dokic was a special expert commentator for the Seven Network, including at Melbourne Park.

In January 2017, she was a commentator for Fox Sports at the Australian Open.

In 2018 the Nine Network signed Jelena Dokic for their newly acquired Tennis Australia broadcast agreement, where she has been a part of every Australian Open since their first in 2019 and regularly provides analysis on key women's and men's feature matches for the network's primary channel in prime time. She has received widespread critical acclaim for her work and also saw her profile further heightened.

Dokic also commentates on the other Grand Slam tournaments for Nine and appears on several magazine programs and topical shows.

In 2021 while commentating on Wimbledon for Channel Nine, Dokic praised the support Ashleigh Barty had received from her parents, prompting Dokic to become so emotional she worried she would ''fall apart'' live on air.

During the 2024 Australian Open, in a post-match interview, Dokic asked Aryna Sabalenka for one of her extra towels after her quarterfinal win. She did so again after her semifinal win, this time asking Sabalenka to sign it so that it could be auctioned off for kids and women affected by domestic violence. This coincided with ATP and Australian Open organisers allowing Alexander Zverev to continue competing in the Men's Draw while facing domestic violence trials in Germany.

Jelena has presented on Nine's lifestyle and travel program Postcards.

In August 2025, Dokic received the Silver Logie Award for Best Factual or Documentary Program at the 65th Annual TV Week Logie Awards, for her work on Unbreakable: The Jelena Dokic Story.

== Books and film ==
Dokic's autobiography, Unbreakable (ISBN 9780143784227), co-written with sports journalist Jess Halloran, in which she relates the story of her life, career, and the years of physical and mental abuse by her father, was published on 13 November 2017. It topped the Australian book charts within the first day of release, and was published in Europe in January 2018.

In 2023, again co-written with Halloran, she published Fearless: Finding the power to thrive, which tells of how she has survived poverty, trauma, and family violence.

A documentary film based on her autobiography, called Unbreakable: The Jelena Dokic Story, co-directed by Halloran and Ivan O'Mahoney, was released in Australian cinemas on 7 November 2024. Luke Buckmaster of The Guardian praised the film, giving it 4 out of 5 stars, as did Garry Maddox of The Sydney Morning Herald. Dokic was interviewed on ABC Radio National about her life, the book, and the film, on 8 November 2024.

== Personal life ==
By the age of 21, Dokic suffered from depression, anxiety, PTSD, and an eating disorder.

In 2023, Dokic waged a public campaign calling out online trolls who targeted her about her weight and fat-shamed her. Dokic has stated that the comments made about her looks and weight have affected her mental health over the years. After appearing on the Australian Open coverage, Dokic stated that she received an uptick of abusive and harassing online comments from trolls.

In 2021, Dokic separated from her partner of 19 years, Tin Bikic.

== Career statistics ==
=== Grand Slam performance timelines ===
Key
W	F	SF	QF	#R	RR	Q#	P#	DNQ	A	Z#	PO	G	S	B	NMS	NTI	P	NH

(W) winner; (F) finalist; (SF) semifinalist; (QF) quarterfinalist; (#R) rounds 4, 3, 2, 1; (RR) round-robin stage; (Q#) qualification round; (P#) preliminary round; (DNQ) did not qualify; (A) absent; (Z#) Davis/Fed Cup Zonal Group (with number indication) or (PO) play-off; (G) gold, (S) silver or (B) bronze Olympic/Paralympic medal; (NMS) not a Masters tournament; (NTI) not a Tier I tournament; (P) postponed; (NH) not held; (SR) strike rate (events won / competed); (W–L) win–loss record.

==== Singles ====
	Australia		FR Yugoslavia / Serbia & Mtn					Australia								
Tournament	1999	2000	2001	2002	2003	2004	2005	2006	2007	2008	2009	2010	2011	2012	SR	W–L
Australian Open	3R	1R	1R	A	A	A	A	1R	A	Q2	QF	1R	2R	2R	0 / 8	8–8
French Open	1R	2R	3R	QF	2R	1R	A	A	A	A	2R	1R	1R	A	0 / 9	9–9
Wimbledon	QF	SF	4R	4R	3R	1R	A	Q1	A	A	1R	Q2	1R	A	0 / 8	17–8
US Open	1R	4R	4R	2R	2R	1R	A	A	A	A	1R	Q1	2R	A	0 / 8	9–8
Win–loss	6–4	9–4	8–4	8–3	4–3	0–3	0–0	0–1	0–0	0–0	5–4	0–2	2–4	1–1	0 / 33	43–33

==== Doubles ====
	Australia		FR Yugoslavia / Serbia & Mtn					Australia										
Tournament	1999	2000	2001	2002	2003	2004	2005	2006	2007	2008	2009	2010	2011	2012	2013	2014	SR	W–L
Australian Open	3R	3R	2R	A	A	A	A	A	A	A	A	1R	1R	1R	A	1R	0 / 7	5–7
French Open	A	3R	F	A	3R	A	A	A	A	A	2R	A	1R	A	A	A	0 / 5	10–5
Wimbledon	3R	3R	3R	A	2R	A	A	A	A	A	A	A	1R	A	A	A	0 / 5	7–5
US Open	1R	2R	2R	A	1R	A	A	A	A	A	A	A	1R	A	A	A	0 / 5	2–5
Win–loss	4–3	7–4	9–4	0–0	3–3	0–0	0–0	0–0	0–0	0–0	1–1	0–1	0–4	0–1	0–0	0–1	0 / 22	24–22

=== Grand Slam tournament finals ===
==== Doubles: 1 (runner–up) ====
Result	Year	Championship	Surface	Partner	Opponents	Score
Loss	2001	French Open	Clay	(Spain) Conchita Martínez	(Spain) Virginia Ruano Pascual (Argentina) Paola Suárez	2–6, 1–6

== Awards ==
1998

- ITF World Junior Champions

2001

- Sportswoman of The Year by Olympic Committee of Yugoslavia

2025

- Silver Logie Award for Best Factual or Documentary Program, 65th Annual TV Week Logie Awards

Awards and achievements
Preceded by (Zimbabwe) Cara Black	ITF Junior World Champion; 1998	Succeeded by (Russia) Lina Krasnoroutskaya
