= Michael Potts (diplomat) =

Australian diplomat

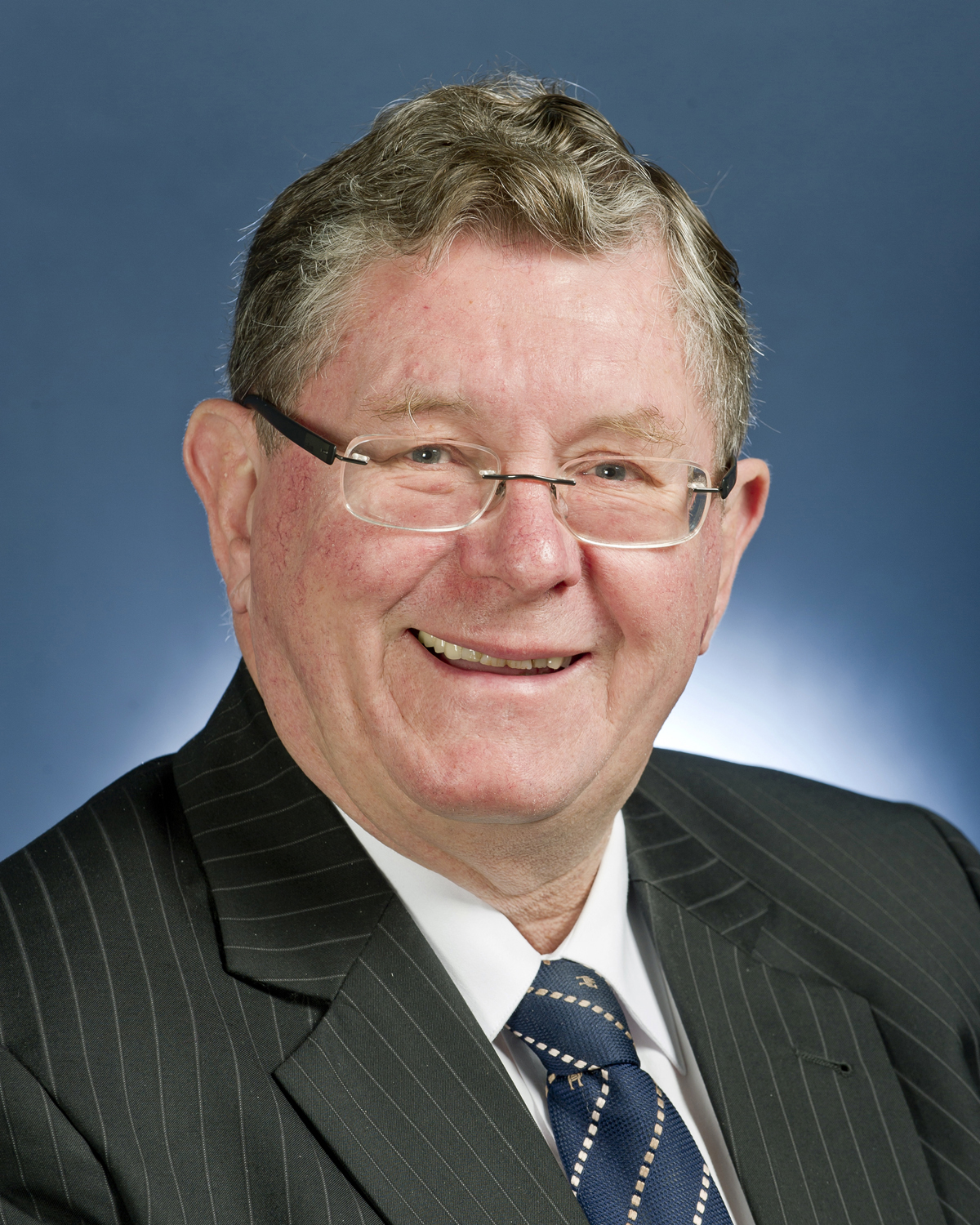
- Born: 7 September 1949 (age 77); Sydney, New South Wales, Australia
- Education: University of Sydney (BA)
- Occupations: Australian public servant and diplomat
- Spouse: Lynda Spiller (m. 1987)

Michael Potts is a retired Australian diplomat and a former Australian High Commissioner to New Zealand.

== Early life and education ==
Potts earned his Bachelor of Arts degree in history from the University of Sydney in 1972.

== Career ==
Potts began his diplomatic career in Madrid, Spain, as Third and Second Secretary from 1973 to 1975. At his next posting in Vientiane, Laos, he served as Second and First Secretary from 1977 to 1979. Following his posting as First Secretary in Dar es Salaam, Tanzania, in 1980, he served as Acting High Commissioner in Lusaka, Zambia, from 1980 to 1983.

Potts returned to the Australian Department of Foreign Affairs and Trade in Canberra in 1984. He held several positions through 2002. He was also an Australian Ambassador to Hanoi, Vietnam, from 1991 to 1994.

Described by The Australian journalist Paul Cleary as a "veteran diplomat" with the characteristics of a "colonial official from a bygone era", Potts is credited with leading efforts to negotiate the Timor Sea Treaty, initially proposing a direct replacement for the Timor Gap Treaty and later provisions of the new treaty when the initial proposal was rejected by the new East Timorese Government.

Potts was appointed Australian High Commissioner to Papua New Guinea in 2003. Potts was High Commissioner in 2005 during the "shoe episode" when hundreds of protesters demonstrated outside the High Commission in Port Moresby, with Potts and his staff inside. The protesters passed a petition to Potts through the gates of the High Commission demanding an apology from the Australian Government.

In 2006, Potts was replaced by Chris Moraitis and was appointed First Assistant Secretary in the International Organisations and Legal Division of the Department of Foreign Affairs and Trade, a position he held until 2009.

In 2009, Potts was appointed as Australian Ambassador to Austria and as Permanent Representative, Australian Permanent Mission to the United Nations in Vienna. Shortly after his appointment, Potts was given responsibility for taking delivery of 1,200 Austrian-made off-road vehicles for the Australian Army, part of a $7.5 billion Project Overlander program to purchase 7,500 new vehicles for the Army. Potts was also responsible for Australia's relationships with a range of Eastern European countries including Ukraine.

In 2012, then-Foreign Minister of Australia Bob Carr, announced that Potts had been appointed as Australian High Commissioner to New Zealand, replacing Paul O'Sullivan (Sullivan was later appointed Chief of Staff to Australia's Attorney General). Potts was charged with managing the relationship with one of Australia's closest neighbours, and was also posted to the Cook Islands. Potts represented Australia at official functions, including the annual Māori Koroneihana at Tūrangawaewae, at the invitation of King Tuheitia.

When he retired in 2016, Potts chose to remain in New Zealand.

Diplomatic posts
New title	Australian High Commissioner to Zambia (Acting); 1980–1983	Succeeded by Ian James
Preceded by Graham Alliband	Australian Ambassador to Vietnam; 1991–1994	Succeeded by Susan Boyd
Preceded by Nick Warner	Australian High Commissioner to Papua New Guinea; 2003–2006	Succeeded by Chris Moraitis
Preceded by Lydia Morton	Australian Ambassador for People Smuggling Issues; 2007–2009	Succeeded by Peter Woolcott
Preceded by Peter Shannon	Australian Ambassador to Austria; 2009–2012	Succeeded by David Stuart
Preceded by Paul O'Sullivan	Australian High Commissioner to New Zealand; 2012–2016	Succeeded by Peter Woolcott
