= List of ambassadors of Australia to Hungary =

Ambassador of Australia to Hungary
- Incumbent; Richard Sadleir since 2019
- Department of Foreign Affairs and Trade
- Style: His Excellency
- Reports to: Minister for Foreign Affairs
- Residence: Vienna, Austria
- Nominator: Prime Minister of Australia
- Appointer: Governor-General of Australia
- Inaugural holder: John Rowland (resident in Vienna)

The Ambassador of Australia to Hungary is an officer of the Australian Department of Foreign Affairs and Trade and the head of the Embassy of the Commonwealth of Australia in Hungary. The Australian Government established an embassy in Budapest in October 1984, and appointed its first resident Ambassador, Oliver Cordell. Previously, responsibility for Australian diplomatic representation in Hungary was held in Austria (1971–1985). At the time, Bill Hayden, then Australian Minister for Foreign Affairs, said that closer ties with Hungary could help Australia to encourage dialogue between the United States and the Soviet Union on matters such as disarmament.

The Australian Embassy in Budapest closed in July 2013. The Government at the time said the closure was because of budget constraints. Currently, the Australian Ambassador to Hungary is accredited from Vienna. The current ambassador, since 2019, is Richard Sadleir.

== List of ambassadors ==
Ordinal	Officeholder	Residency	Term start date	Term end date	Time in office	Notes
1	John Rowland	Vienna, Austria	1972	1974	1–2 years	
2	Robert Furlonger	Vienna, Austria	1974	1977	2–3 years	
3	James Cumes	Vienna, Austria	1977	1980	2–3 years	
4	Duncan Campbell	Vienna, Austria	1980	1984	3–4 years	
5	John Kelso	Vienna, Austria	1984	1985	0–1 years	
6	Oliver Cordell	Budapest, Hungary	1985	1988	2–3 years	
7	Doug Townsend	Budapest, Hungary	1988	1991	2–3 years	
8	Donald Kingsmill	Budapest, Hungary	1992	1995	2–3 years	
9	Patrick Robertson	Budapest, Hungary	1995	1998	2–3 years	
10	Mark Higgie	Budapest, Hungary	1998	2001	2–3 years	
11	Leo Cruise	Budapest, Hungary	2001	2004	2–3 years	
12	Clare Birgin	Budapest, Hungary	2004	2007	2–3 years	
13	Alex Brooking	Budapest, Hungary	2007	2011	3–4 years	
14	John Griffin	Budapest, Hungary	2011	2013	1–2 years	
15	David Stuart	Vienna, Austria	2013	2016	2–3 years	
16	Brendon Hammer	Vienna, Austria	October 2016	2019	2–3 years	
17	Richard Sadleir	Vienna, Austria	2019	incumbent	6–7 years	
