= List of ambassadors of Australia to Austria =

Ambassador of Australia to Austria Permanent Representative of Australia to the United Nations Office in Vienna

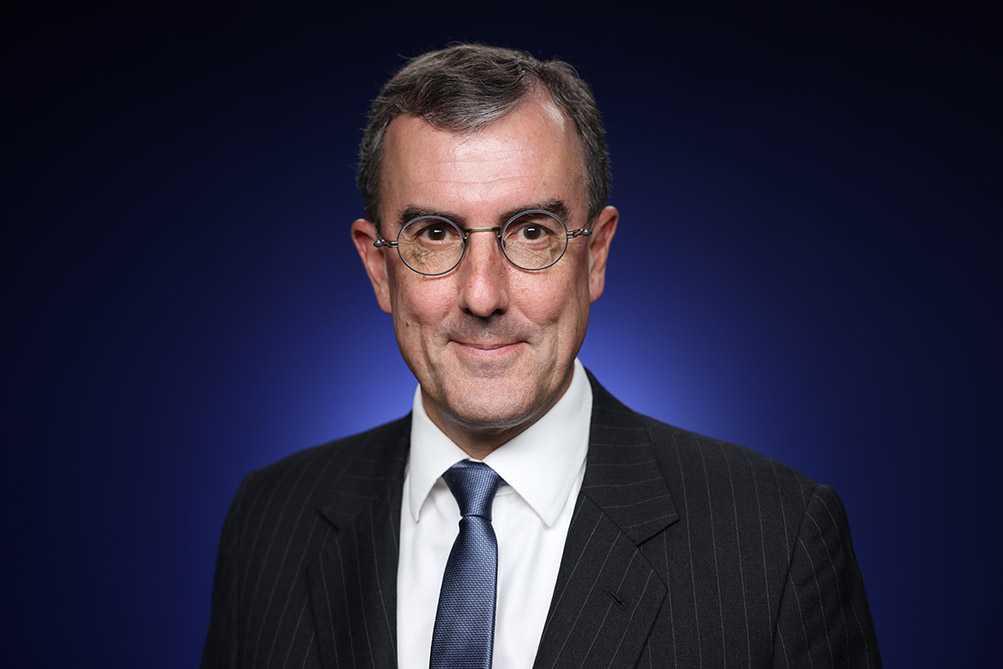
- Incumbent; Ian Biggs since 22 May 2023
- Department of Foreign Affairs and Trade
- Style: His Excellency
- Reports to: Minister for Foreign Affairs
- Nominator: Prime Minister of Australia
- Appointer: Governor General of Australia
- Inaugural holder: Malcolm Morris
- Formation: 1966
- Website: Australian Embassy and Permanent Mission to the United Nations, Austria

The ambassador of Australia to Austria and permanent representative of Australia to the United Nations Office in Vienna is an officer of the Australian Department of Foreign Affairs and Trade and the head of the Embassy of the Commonwealth of Australia to the Republic of Austria in Vienna. The position has the rank and status of an ambassador extraordinary and plenipotentiary and holds non-resident accreditation for Bosnia and Herzegovina (since November 1995), Hungary (since 2013), Kosovo (since 21 May 2008), Slovakia (since 1993), and Slovenia (since 5 February 1992) as a non-resident ambassador. From 1968 to 1974 the ambassador held accreditation for Switzerland until it was transferred to a newly opened Australian embassy in Bern. An Australian embassy existed in Budapest, Hungary, from 1972 until its closure in July 2013. From February 1992 to October 1999, the ambassador in Vienna also held accreditation to Croatia. From 1973 to 1978, responsibility for Czechoslovakia was held by the ambassador resident in Vienna, after which it was transferred to the Australian Embassy in Warsaw.

The ambassador is currently Ian Biggs. Austria and Australia have enjoyed official diplomatic relations since 1966. The ambassador also acts as Australia's permanent representative to the United Nations Office in Vienna since its establishment on 1 January 1980, including as the representative and governor on the Board of Governors of the International Atomic Energy Agency (IAEA) and the Comprehensive Test Ban Treaty (CTBTO) Preparatory Commission.

== List of ambassadors ==
Ordinal	Officeholder	Other offices	Term start date	Term end date	Time in office	Notes
1	Malcolm Morris	^{A}	1966	1970	1–2 years	
2	Lawrence Corkery	^{A}	1970	1972	1–2 years	
3	John Rowland	^{A}^{B}^{I}	1972	1974	1–2 years	
4	Robert Furlonger	^{B}^{I}	February 1975	1977	1–2 years	
5	James Cumes	^{B}^{I}	1977	1980	2–3 years	
6	Duncan Campbell	^{C}^{I}	1980	1984	3–4 years	
7	John Kelso	^{C}^{I}	1984	1988	3–4 years	
8	Michael Wilson	^{C}^{D}^{E}	1988	1993	4–5 years	
9	Ronald Walker	^{C}^{D}^{E}^{F}^{G}	1993	1996	2–3 years	
10	Lance Joseph	^{C}^{D}^{E}^{F}^{G}	1996	2000	3–4 years	
11	Max Hughes	^{C}^{E}^{F}^{G}	2000	2003	2–3 years	
12	Deborah Stokes	^{C}^{E}^{F}^{G}	2003	2006	2–3 years	
13	Peter Shannon	^{C}^{E}^{F}^{G}^{H}	2006	2009	2–3 years	
14	Michael Potts	^{C}^{E}^{F}^{G}^{H}	2009	2012	2–3 years	
15	David Stuart	^{C}^{E}^{F}^{G}^{H}^{I}	12 September 2012	2016	3–4 years	
16	Brendon Hammer	^{C}^{E}^{F}^{G}^{H}^{I}	October 2016	September 2019	2 years, 11 months	
17	Richard Sadleir	^{C}^{E}^{F}^{G}^{H}^{I}	September 2019	incumbent	7 years	

=== Notes ===
^A Also non-resident Ambassador to the Swiss Confederation, 28 August 1968–1974.
^B Also non-resident Ambassador to Czechoslovakia, 1973–1978.
^C Permanent Representative to the United Nations in Vienna, 1 January 1980–present.
^D Also non-resident Ambassador to the Republic of Croatia, 13 February 1992–October 1999.
^E Also non-resident Ambassador to the Republic of Slovenia, 13 February 1992–present.
^F Also non-resident Ambassador to the Slovak Republic, 1995–present.
^G Also non-resident Ambassador to Bosnia and Herzegovina, November 1995–present.
^H Also non-resident Ambassador to the Republic of Kosovo, 21 May 2008–present.
^I Also non-resident Ambassador to Hungary, 1972–1985, and July 2013–present.
