= Robert Furlonger =

Australian public servant and diplomat (1921–2019)

Bob Furlonger CB
- Born: Robert William Furlonger; 28 April 1921; Balgowlah, New South Wales
- Died: 19 January 2019 (aged 97); Canberra, Australia
- Occupations: Public servant, diplomat

Robert William Furlonger CB (28 April 1921 – 19 January 2019) was an Australian public servant and diplomat. He was an Australian Ambassador to Indonesia (1972–1975), Australian Ambassador to Austria and Hungary (1975–1977) and the first Director-General of the Office of National Assessments (1977–1981).

== Career ==
Furlonger joined the Commonwealth Public Service in the Department of External Affairs in 1945 as a cadet. His cadetship was for two-years and included him being given a project researching the Free France movement.

In December 1961 Furlonger was appointed the Australian Consul-General at Geneva and the Permanent Representative of Australia to the United Nations Office in Geneva.

From 1972 to 1975 Furlonger was Australian Ambassador to Indonesia. During his post to Indonesia, he hosted the Prime Minister of Australia, William McMahon in Jakarta, Indonesia. .

Between 1975 and 1977 Furlonger was Ambassador to Austria. He was the first Director-General of the Office of National Assessments, from 1977 to 1981.

Furlonger retired in 1981.

== Awards ==
Furlonger was made a Companion of the Order of the Bath in the 1981 Birthday Honours for his public service including as Director-General of the Office of National Assessments.

Diplomatic posts
Preceded by Lawrence Arnott	Permanent Representative of Australia to the United Nations Office in Geneva; Australian Consul-General at Geneva; 1961–1964	Succeeded by Brian Hill
Preceded by Gordon Jockel	Australian Ambassador to Indonesia; 1972–1975	Succeeded by Richard Woolcott
Preceded by John Rowland	Australian Ambassador to Austria; Australian Ambassador to Hungary; 1975–1977	Succeeded by James Cumes
Government offices
New title Office established	Director-General of the Office of National Assessments; 1977–1981	Succeeded by Michael Cook
