= Damir Dokić =

Serbian tennis coach (1959–2025)

Damir Dokić (Serbian: Дамир Докић; 1959 – 16 May 2025) was a Serbian tennis coach. He was the father and first coach of former professional tennis player Jelena Dokic. He gained notoriety for being involved in various violent incidents in which he was verbally and physically abusive.

== Early life and education ==
Damir Dokić, a Serb, and his wife Ljiljana (née Podnar), a Croat, lived in Osijek where they had two children, Jelena born in 1983 and her younger brother, Savo.

Dokić was a self-proclaimed veteran of the Croatian War of Independence, in which he fought on the side of the Serbs. Due to the instability of the breakup of Yugoslavia, the family settled in Sombor, Serbia for a short time before immigrating to Australia in 1994.

Upon arrival in Australia they lived in Fairfield, a suburb of Sydney.

== Coaching career ==
Dokić coached his daughter Jelena from a young age until 2002.

In 1999, Jelena, a qualifier at Wimbledon and ranked no 129 at the time, caused an upset when she defeated world No. 1 Martina Hingis in straight sets in the first round. Jelena rapidly ascended through the rankings after her Wimbledon breakthrough but her time in the world elite was beset by off-court struggles. Jelena has stated that her father had abused her verbally, emotionally, and physically on a regular basis throughout her childhood and during her career.

On the advice of her outspoken father and coach, Jelena switched allegiance to the Federal Republic of Yugoslavia in November 2000. In 2002, Jelena dropped her father as coach and, in 2003, hired Borna Bikić to replace him. She switched her allegiance back to Australia in 2005.

For a time, after he ceased being his daughter's coach, Dokić returned to Serbia where he manufactured plum and pear "Eagle Brandy".

== Incidents ==
In 2000, Dokić threw a piece of fish at a cafeteria worker at the US Open after complaining about paying $10 for it. He was then banned from the tournament.

At the 2001 Australian Open, after Jelena Dokić's first-round loss to Lindsay Davenport, Dokić said that there were irregularities in the draw and that he was banned from the tournament due to abusive behavior. He later said "I think the draw is fixed just for her."

During the 2002 Australian Open, he was featured in a series of advertisements for Kia Motors, the title sponsor of the event, poking fun at his past misconduct. Kia defended the choice, citing 98 percent recognition of him and saying that he would not be too expensive.

In June 2009, after Dokić threatened the Australian ambassador to Serbia, Clare Birgin, with a hand grenade, Dokić was sentenced to 15 months in prison for causing public danger and for the illegal possession of weapons. He appealed against the sentence but it was upheld in September 2009. Following a further appeal, the sentence was reduced to 12 months and Dokić was released from jail in April 2010.

== Death ==
Dokić died on 16 May 2025.
