= Owen Harries =

Australian academic (1930–2020)

Australian Ambassador to UNESCO
- In office 1982–1983

Editor-in-chief, The National Interest
- In office 1985–2001

Personal details
- Born: Owen Harries; 29 March 1930 Garnant, Wales
- Died: 25 June 2020 (aged 90)
- Spouse: Dorothy Richards
- Parent(s): David Harries and Maud Jones
- Education: University of Wales; Lincoln College, University of Oxford
- Occupation: Academic and writer

Owen Harries (23 March 1930 – 25 June 2020) was an Australian foreign-policy intellectual and founding editor of The National Interest magazine in Washington, DC.

== Early life and education ==
Harries was born in Wales in 1930 and educated at Oxford University, where his tutor was political theorist John Plamenatz and his lecturers included philosopher Sir Isaiah Berlin.

== Career ==
After two years in the Royal Air Force in the early 1950s, he and his wife Dorothy moved to Sydney. From 1955 to 1975, he was a senior lecturer in government at the University of Sydney and then an associate professor of politics at the University of New South Wales, before a sojourn teaching at the Australian National University in Canberra.

From 1976 to 1983, he served the Australian centre-right coalition government of prime minister Malcolm Fraser in several senior posts, including head of policy planning in the Australian Department of Foreign Affairs, senior adviser to both Foreign Minister Andrew Peacock and Fraser, as well as Australian Ambassador to UNESCO in Paris.

During this period, he was widely credited for principally drafting Australia's foreign policy in the post-Vietnam period as well as shaping and articulating the conservative and liberal ideas which formed the philosophical basis of the then Liberal government. After the defeat of the Fraser government in 1983, he moved to Washington, DC, where he served as senior fellow at The Heritage Foundation. He played a leading role in encouraging the Reagan administration to withdraw from UNESCO.

== The National Interest (1985–2001) ==
He was co-founder with Irving Kristol and co-editor with Robert W. Tucker of The National Interest, a Washington, D.C.–based foreign policy magazine, which they turned into one of America's most influential political publications. Over the years, they published essays by Francis Fukuyama, Samuel P. Huntington, Henry Kissinger, Fareed Zakaria, Irving Kristol, and others. According to The Bulletin, during his co-editorship from 1985 to 2001 he was "known as probably the most famous Australian in Washington".

After returning to Sydney in 2001, Harries remained editor emeritus at The National Interest while serving on its editorial board. He was a senior fellow at the Centre for Independent Studies and a visiting fellow at the Lowy Institute for International Policy. In his last years, he collaborated with the Australian conservative writer Tom Switzer.

=== Ideas and writings ===
Harries was influential in policy debates, especially US-Australia relations. While being among the strongest supporters of the US-Australia alliance, he did not shy away from criticism of the United States.

In the 1960s, he was a prominent supporter of Australia's involvement in the Vietnam War. Four decades later, he was a trenchant critic of the Iraq War, of the leading intellectual architects of that war, and of Australia's involvement in it. In 2003, in the heat of the Iraq debate, he delivered the ABC’s Boyer Lectures, which have been published under the title.

Harries was a member of the Australian Association for Cultural Freedom, a group that produced Quadrant magazine, on whose editorial board he sat. Harries met with Australian federal treasurer William McMahon in June 1967 to request that Quadrant receive the same amount of support from the Commonwealth Literary Fund as literary journal Meanjin, a request McMahon passed, with his own recommendation, to prime minister Harold Holt.

Over the years, he edited and contributed to several books on culture, politics and international relations. He was also a regular contributor to several newspapers around the world, including the New York Times, Washington Post, Wall Street Journal, The Times, as well as magazines Commentary, Foreign Affairs, National Review and The New Republic.

In 2011, Harries was presented for admission to the degree of Doctor of Letters (honoris causa) at the University of Sydney.

== Death ==
Harries died in Sydney on 25 June 2020, at age 90.

== Articles ==
- Harries, Owen (1 September 1984). "A Primer for Polemicists". Commentary.
- Harries, Owen; Switzer, Tom (Summer 2006). "Loyal to a Fault". The American Interest. Archived from the original on 30 November 2010.
- Harries, Owen; Switzer, Tom (3 October 2006). "Little magazine leaves big mark". The Australian.
- Harries, Owen; Switzer, Tom (21 January 2011). "US strikes the right balance on China". The Australian. Archived from the original on 4 March 2016.
- Harries, Owen; Switzer, Tom (May–June 2013). "Leading from Behind: Third Time a Charm?". The American Interest. Archived from the original on 19 April 2013.

Diplomatic posts
Preceded by Ralph Slatyer	Permanent Delegate of Australia to UNESCO; 1982–1983	Succeeded by Gough Whitlam
