= Peter Bowler (lexicographer) =

Australian lexicographer (1934–2020)

Peter John Bowler
- Born: 25 May 1934; Dubbo, NSW, Australia
- Died: 25 July 2020 (aged 86); Caboolture, QLD, Australia
- Known for: Author/lexicographer

Peter Bowler was an Australian lexicographer and author of The Superior Person's Book of Words, The Superior Person's Second Book of Weird and Wondrous Words, and The Superior Person's Third Book of Well-Bred Words. He specialized in esoteric, arcane, archaic, and otherwise unusual words, which he catalogued humorously in his three books, along with "real-life" situations in which such words might come in handy

A spare-time author, his main work lay in his forty years in education policy and management, in both public and private sectors. He was at various times: leader of Australian delegations to the Unesco/IBM World Conference on Public Education in Geneva and the Conference of Directors of Education in the South Pacific; member of Australian delegations to Commonwealth of Nations Education and Medical Conferences, Chairman of the Commonwealth of Nations Book Development Committee; member of the National Training Council and Australian Apprenticeship Advisory Committee; member of the Australian Council for Educational Research; member of Interim Councils for the Royal Military College and the National Maritime College; Australian representative on the OECD Education Committee and the International Council for Educational Media; Director of Further Education in the Australian Capital Territory; Director of the National Office of Youth Affairs; Deputy Principal of City International College, Sydney; Deputy CEO of St John Ambulance in Australia (he was an Officer of the Order of St John); and vice-president of the Abbey Museum of Art and Archaeology in Brisbane.

His books about words are published in the US by David R Godine of Boston and in the UK by Bloomsbury of London. His other books have included: The True Believers (about the world of lunatic cults and sects); The Pan paperback What a Way to Go; the crime novel Human Remains; The Creepy-Crawly (a book of verse for children) and Your Child From One to Ten (a manual for parents on child development). He also wrote and edited books on emergency care and its theoretical medical foundations. One or another book in the Superior Person's series has been in print at all times since 1979.

In his later years Bowler suffered from Parkinson's disease. He died at Caboolture Hospital on 25 July 2020 and is survived by his second wife Diane, and his two sons Denis and Ross.

== Selected passages ==
- "Circumambagious, a. – Employing a roundabout or indirect manner of speech. Not as effective, perhaps, on the whole, as an aid to obfuscation, as the sesquipedalianism fostered by this book, always assuming, if you will forgive a somewhat Jamesian digression (Henry, that is to say, in contradistinction to P.D.), that obfuscation is in fact the objective, and having in mind also that, setting aside the relative merits of the two different approaches toward that end, vis-a-vis each other, it can hardly be doubted that the employment of both together, as distinct from one or the other, must have a still greater obfuscatory, or perhaps more precisely, obscurantist, impact, a point well evidenced by the fact that this particular instance of circumambagiousness has, as I believe you will discover, successfully diverted your attention from the fact that nowhere in this admittedly now somewhat overlong sentence is there, despite its superabundance of subsidiary clauses, a principal subject or verb."

== Works ==
Year	Title	Notes
1979	The Superior Person's Little Book of Words; published in the US (1985) as The Superior Person's Book of Words	
1983	What a Way to Go!	
1984	The Annotated Onomasticon	
1986	The True Believers	
1986	Farvel & Tak!	Danish edition of What a Way to Go!
1989	Your Child From One to Ten	
1991	The Superior Person's Second Little Book of Words	
1996	The Superior Person's Great Big Book of Words	
1998	Human Remains	fiction
2001	The Superior Person's Third Book of Well-bred Words	
2005	The Creepy-Crawly	verse
2008	The Superior Person's Field Guide to Deceitful, Deceptive and Downright Dangerous Language	
2009	The Completely Superior Person's Book of Words	
2010	The De Reszke Record	fiction
