= David Stuart (diplomat) =

Australian diplomat

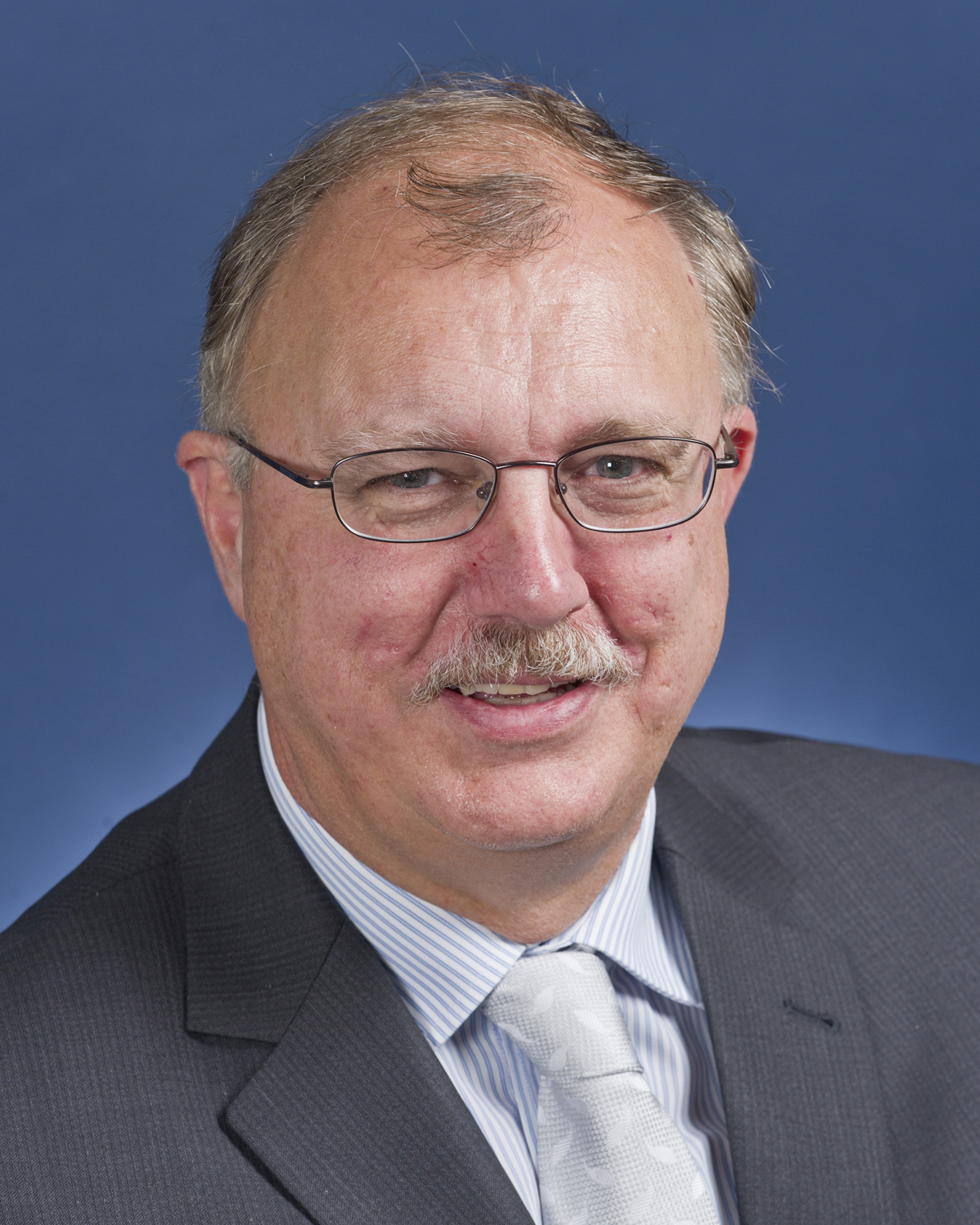
- David Stuart
- Education: Macquarie University; Australian National University
- Occupations: Public servant, diplomat

David Stuart was the Ambassador of Australia to Austria from 2012 to 2016. Prior, he was the Deputy Chief of Mission at the Embassy of Australia in Washington, D.C., between 2007 and 2010. Stuart was appointed to the position in July 2007. Before his role as Deputy Chief of Mission, Stuart served in the Department of Foreign Affairs and Trade (1981), was the Third Secretary at the Embassy of Australia in Madrid (1981–1984), a member of the Australian delegation to the United Nations Human Rights Council (1988–1992), Counsellor for Political Affairs at the Embassy of Australia in Jakarta (1997–1999), Australian ambassador and Deputy Permanent Representative to the United Nations (1999–2002), and the First Assistant Secretary at the International Security Division in Canberra.

Additional positions held by Stuart include Western Bureau representative and vice-chairman of the UN Commission on Sustainable Development, a member of Australia's Mission to the United Nations as delegate on the UN General Assembly's Third Committee, Assistant Secretary of the Strategic Affairs Branch, and Assistant Secretary of the Strategic Policy and Intelligence Branch.

On 5 July 2012, Stuart was appointed Australian ambassador to Austria, and presented his credentials to the Austrian President on 15 September 2012.

Stuart attended Macquarie University and Australian National University where he obtained degrees in Arts and Economics. In 1995, he graduated from the Joint Australian Services Staff College. Stuart is married with three children, and speaks Spanish and Indonesian.

== See also ==
- Australia-United States relations
- Foreign relations of Australia

Diplomatic posts
Preceded by Michael Potts	Australian Ambassador to Austria; 2012–2016	Succeeded by Brendon Hammer
