= Permanent Representative of Australia to the United Nations =

Ambassador and Permanent Representative of Australia to the United Nations

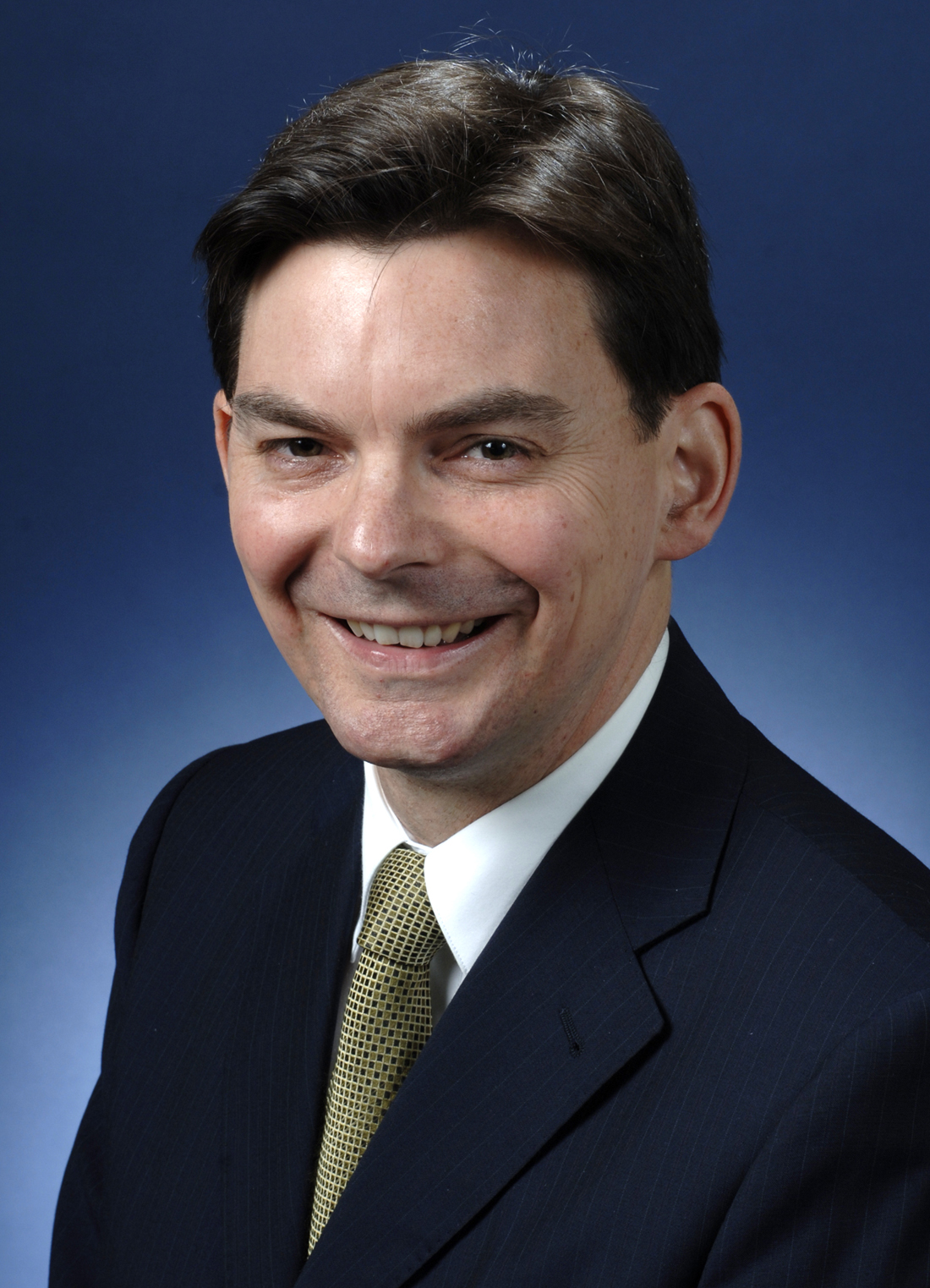
- Incumbent; James Larsen since 26 July 2023
- Department of Foreign Affairs and Trade
- Style: His Excellency
- Reports to: Minister for Foreign Affairs
- Residence: New York
- Nominator: Prime Minister of Australia
- Appointer: Governor-General of Australia
- Inaugural holder: Norman Makin (as Head of Delegation)
- Formation: 1946
- Website: Permanent Representative

The ambassador and permanent representative of Australia to the United Nations is an officer of the Australian Department of Foreign Affairs and Trade and the head of the Permanent Mission of the Commonwealth of Australia to the United Nations in New York. The position has the rank and status of an ambassador extraordinary and plenipotentiary and is the lead Australian representative to the UN, although that role is also shared with representatives present at the United Nations Office in Geneva, the United Nations Office in Vienna and the United Nations Office at Nairobi, and the delegations to UNESCO and the United Nations Agencies in Rome. Australia is a charter member of the United Nations and has sent representatives to New York since 1946.

The permanent representative, currently James Larsen, is charged with representing Australia during plenary meetings of the General Assembly and, when Australia holds a non-permanent seat or by invitation, the Security Council, except in the rare situation in which a more senior officer (such as the Minister for Foreign Affairs or the Prime Minister of Australia) is present. The post is appointed by the Governor-General of Australia in the name of the monarch, and nominated by the prime minister.

== List of permanent representatives ==
#	Officeholder	Image	Term start date	Term end date	Time in office	Notes
1	Norman Makin (Head of Delegation)		1945	1946	0–1 years	
2	Paul Hasluck		1946	1947	0–1 years	
3	John Hood		1947	1950	2–3 years	
−	Mick Shann (Acting)		1950	1951	0–1 years	
4	Bill Forsyth		1951	1956	4–5 years	
5	Edward Ronald Walker		1956	1959	2–3 years	
6	James Plimsoll		1959	1963	3–4 years	
7	David Hay		1964	1965	0–1 years	
8	Patrick Shaw		1965	1970	4–5 years	
9	Laurence McIntyre		1970	1975	4–5 years	
10	Ralph Harry		1975	1978	2–3 years	
11	Harold David Anderson		1978	1982	3–4 years	
12	Richard Woolcott		1982	1988	5–6 years	
−	Michael Costello (Acting)		1988	1989	0–1 years	
13	Peter Wilenski		1989	1992	2–3 years	
14	Richard Butler		1992	1996	3–4 years	
15	Penelope Wensley		1997	2001	3–4 years	
16	John Dauth		2001	2006	4–5 years	
−	Caroline Millar (Acting)		2006	2006	0 years	
17	Robert Hill		2006	2009	2–3 years	
18	Gary Quinlan		2009	2014	4–5 years	
19	Gillian Bird		2015	2019	3–4 years	
20	Mitch Fifield		17 October 2019	1 July 2023	3 years, 257 days	
21	James Larsen		26 July 2023	Incumbent	3 years, 112 days	

== See also ==
- Australia and the United Nations
- List of ambassadors and high commissioners of Australia
