= Caroline Millar =

Australian diplomat and public servant

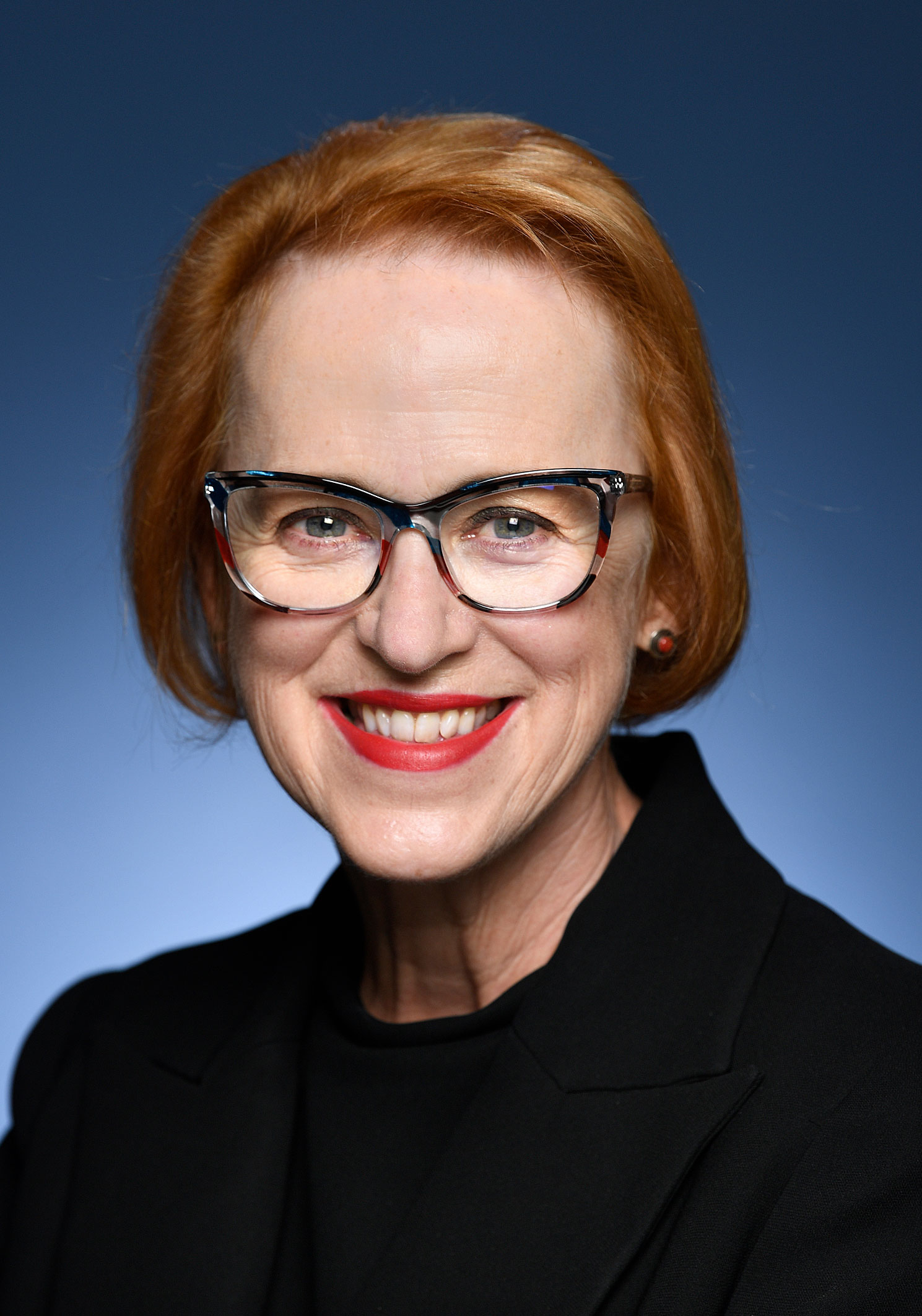

Australian Ambassador to Belgium, Luxembourg, the European Union and NATO
- In office November 2021 – March 2025
- Monarchs: Elizabeth II; Charles III
- Prime Minister: Scott Morrison; Anthony Albanese
- Minister: Marise Payne; Penny Wong
- Preceded by: Justin Brown; Trudy Witbreuk (Chargé d'affaires)
- Succeeded by: Angus Campbell

Permanent Representative of Australia to the United Nations Office in Geneva
- In office May 2006 – February 2010
- Monarch: Elizabeth II
- Prime Minister: John Howard; Kevin Rudd
- Minister: Alexander Downer; Stephen Smith
- Preceded by: Michael Smith
- Succeeded by: Peter Woolcott

Australian Ambassador for People Smuggling and Human Trafficking
- In office 30 July 2003 – 19 December 2005
- Monarch: Elizabeth II
- Prime Minister: John Howard
- Minister: Alexander Downer
- Preceded by: John Buckley
- Succeeded by: Lydia Morton

Personal details
- Born: 1958 (age 67–68) Melbourne, Victoria, Australia
- Education: University of Cambridge (BA, MA)

Caroline Millar (born 1958) is an Australian diplomat and public servant who served as Ambassador to Belgium, Luxembourg, the European Union and NATO. She has previously served as the Deputy Secretary for National Security of the Department of the Prime Minister and Cabinet, Deputy Head of Mission of the Australian Embassy in Washington, D.C., the Permanent Representative to the United Nations in Geneva, and was briefly the acting-Head of Mission of the Australian Permanent Mission to the United Nations in New York.

== Early career ==
Born in Melbourne, Victoria in 1958, Millar received her tertiary education at the University of Cambridge, from which she graduated with a Bachelor of Arts (Honours) and a Master of Arts in History. Millar's first posting after joining the Australian Department of Foreign Affairs and Trade was as Second Secretary to the embassy in Hanoi, Vietnam (1985–1987). In 1989 Millar became First Secretary to the Australian embassy in Washington and in 1991 was also seconded to the Australian Office of National Assessments as a Senior Americas Analyst. In 1995, Millar was sent to New York to be a Counsellor in the Permanent Mission to the United Nations, serving until 1998.

== Later career ==
After holding various administrative positions in Canberra, Millar was appointed the Ambassador for People Smuggling Issues in 2003. Serving until 2005, between February and April 2006 Millar acted as Head of Mission to the Permanent Mission to the UN in New York and was thereafter appointed to succeed Michael Smith as Permanent Representative of Australia to the United Nations Office in Geneva. In 2006, Millar was elected as President of the Anti-Personnel Mine Ban Convention's Seventh Meeting of the States Parties (7MSP), or Ottawa Treaty. Ambassador Millar was only the second woman to lead the treaty.

In 2008 Millar represented Australia during the Oslo Process that resulted in the 2008 adoption of the Convention on Cluster Munitions. While in Geneva Millar served as President of the Conference on Disarmament, but found the deadlock over the disarmament issue very frustrating: "To those unfamiliar with the arcane workings of this chamber, this is neither understandable nor acceptable. To those within it, it is all too familiar and dispiriting."

Returning to Australia from Geneva in 2010, Millar was appointed Head of the United Nations Security Council Taskforce dealing with Australia's bid for a non-permanent seat on the council (2013–2014) and then was made First Assistant Secretary of the International Security Division. In January 2014 Millar was appointed Deputy Head of Mission to Ambassador Kim Beazley in Washington.

In November 2021 Millar took up her appointment as Ambassador to Belgium, Luxembourg, the European Union and NATO. She was recalled from this position in January 2025.

Diplomatic posts
Preceded by John Buckley	Australian Ambassador for People Smuggling Issues; 2003–2005	Succeeded by Lydia Morton
Preceded by John Dauth	Permanent Representative of Australia to the United Nations (acting); 2006	Succeeded by Robert Hill
Preceded by Michael Smith	Permanent Representative of Australia to the UN Office in Geneva; 2006–2010	Succeeded by Peter Woolcott
Preceded by Justin Brown	Australian Ambassador to Belgium, Luxembourg, the EU, and NATO; 2021–date	Incumbent
