= Justin Lee =

Justin Lee may refer to:

- Justin Lee (activist) (born 1977), founder of the Gay Christian Network, now known as Q Christian Fellowship
- Justin Lee (actor) (born 1989), Korean-American actor
- Justin Lee (diplomat), Australian High Commissioner to Bangladesh
- Justin Lee (footballer) (born 1990), Guamanian football player
- Justin Lee Collins (born 1974), English media personality
- Changjoon Justin Lee, neuroscientist specializing in glioscience

== See also ==
- Justin Lee sex scandal (born 1985), sexual assaults in Taiwan
