= Robert Hill (Australian politician) =

Australian politician (born 1946)

The Honourable Robert Hill AC
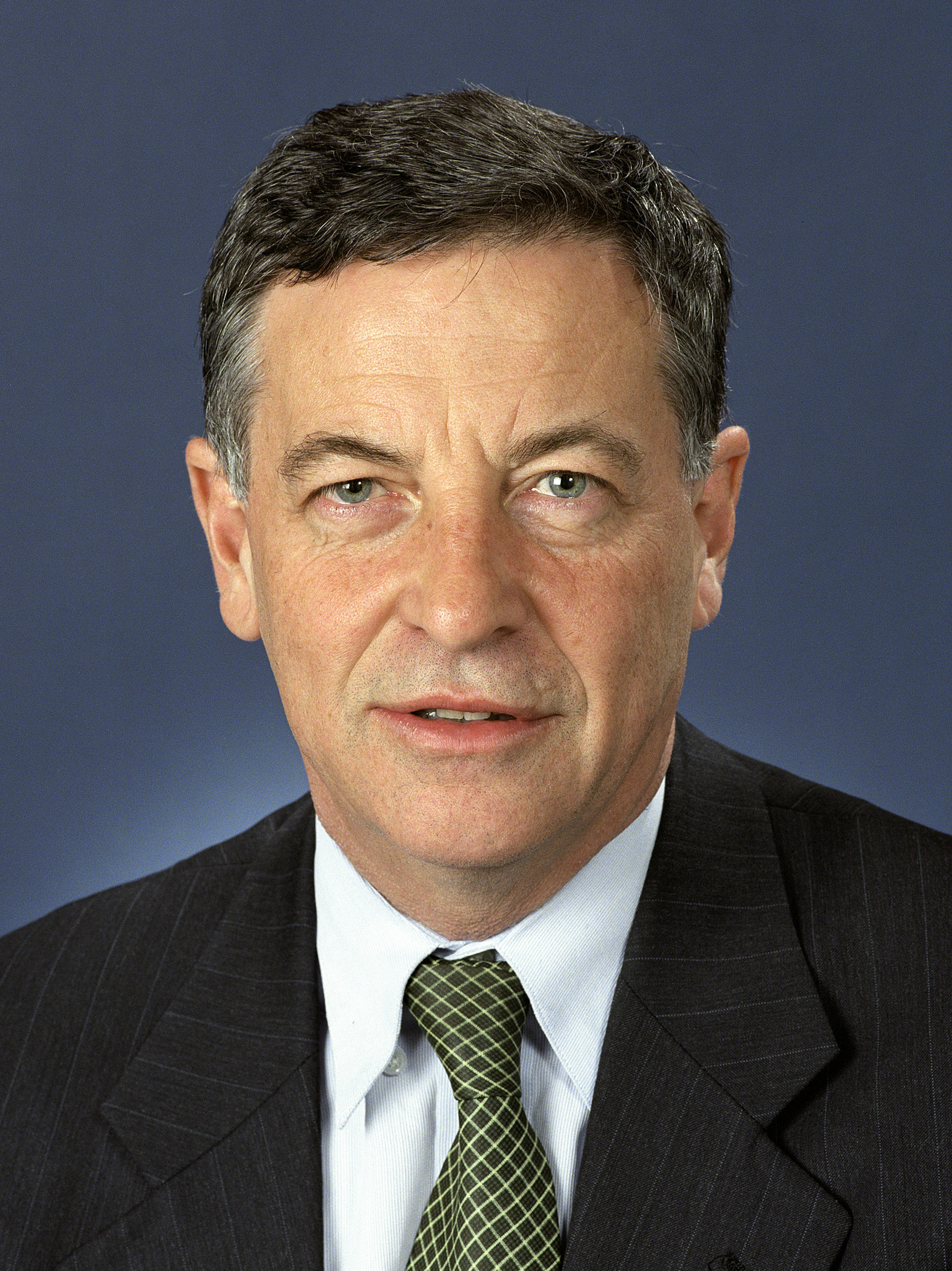
- Official portrait, 2006

15th Chancellor of the University of Adelaide
- In office 26 July 2010 – 25 July 2014
- Deputy: Pamela Martin; Di Davidson
- Preceded by: John von Doussa
- Succeeded by: Di Davidson (acting); Kevin Scarce

Permanent Representative of Australia to the United Nations
- In office 27 March 2006 – May 2009
- Preceded by: Caroline Millar (acting)
- Succeeded by: Gary Quinlan

Minister for Defence
- In office 12 November 2001 – 27 January 2006
- Prime Minister: John Howard
- Preceded by: Peter Reith
- Succeeded by: Brendan Nelson

Minister for the Environment
- In office 11 March 1996 – 12 November 2001
- Prime Minister: John Howard
- Preceded by: John Faulkner (Note: Preceded as Minister for Environment, Sport and Territories)
- Succeeded by: David Kemp

Leader of the Government in the Senate
- In office 11 March 1996 – 20 January 2006
- Preceded by: Gareth Evans
- Succeeded by: Nick Minchin

Leader of the Opposition in the Senate
- In office 3 April 1990 – 11 March 1996
- Preceded by: Fred Chaney
- Succeeded by: John Faulkner

Senator for South Australia
- In office 1 July 1981 – 15 March 2006
- Preceded by: Condor Laucke
- Succeeded by: Cory Bernardi

Personal details
- Born: 25 September 1946 (age 80) Adelaide, South Australia
- Party: Liberal
- Spouse: Diana Marie
- Children: 4, including Victoria Hill
- Parent: Murray Hill (father)
- Education: Scotch College, Adelaide
- Alma mater: University of Adelaide (BA; LLB); London School of Economics (LLM)
- Occupation: Barrister; diplomat; politician
- Robert Hill's voice Hill speaking about environmentalism Recorded 4 September 2025

Robert Murray Hill (born 25 September 1946) is an Australian former barrister, diplomat, and politician who served as a Senator for South Australia from 1981 to 2006, representing the Liberal Party. He served as Minister for the Environment from 1996 to 2001 and as Minister for Defence from 2001 to 2006 in the Howard government.

Born in Adelaide, South Australia, to Murray Hill, a politician and real estate professional, Hill was educated at Scotch College and the University of Adelaide, where he earned bachelor's degrees in arts and law, before completing a Master of Laws at the London School of Economics. After returning to Adelaide in 1970, he practised as a barrister and solicitor and became actively involved in the Liberal Party, holding senior state positions including chair of the South Australian Liberal Party Campaign Committee, vice-president of the South Australian Liberal Party, and chair of the Liberal Party Constitution Committee. Early in his legal career, he also contributed to drafting the first bill introduced in South Australia to decriminalise homosexuality between consenting adult men.

Hill held multiple committee and party positions throughout his career in the Australian Senate. During his early Senate years, he served on committees including Constitutional and Legal Affairs, Foreign Affairs and Defence, and the Parliamentary Library, and held party roles such as President of the South Australian Liberal Party and member of the Federal Executive. Re-elected in 1987 and 1990, he held shadow ministerial roles covering justice, foreign affairs, defence, public administration, and education, and served as Leader of the Opposition in the Senate from 1990 to 1996. Following the 1996 election, Hill became Leader of the Government in the Senate and was appointed Minister for the Environment, representing the environment, sport and territories portfolio, and led Australia's climate negotiations at Kyoto. In 2001, he became Minister for Defence, overseeing Australia's involvement in Afghanistan, the Iraq War, and regional peacekeeping, while reassessing national defence strategy and engaging with international partners. Hill resigned from Parliament in 2006 after nearly 25 years of service, with his final acts including supporting the transfer of regulatory control over the drug RU486.

After resigning, Hill was appointed permanent representative of Australia to the United Nations (UN), serving from 2006 to 2009. Following his UN tenure, he chaired the Carbon Trust, contributed as an adjunct professor at the United States Studies Centre, and led the Dow Sustainability Program at the University of Sydney. In 2010, Hill became the 15th chancellor of the University of Adelaide, serving two terms until 2014, and during this period joined the advisory board of United Against Nuclear Iran, the board of Climateworks Australia, and chaired the Cooperative Research Centre for Low Carbon Living. From 2013 onwards, he held multiple leadership roles, including chair of Re.Group, board member of North Harbour Clean Energy, member of the Oversight Board for the Australian Defence Force First Principles Review, and non-executive director of Rheinmetall Defence Australia. He also chaired the NSW Biodiversity Conservation Trust Board, served on the Asia Pacific Board of The Nature Conservancy, and was a governor of WWF-Australia, while heading the Antarctic Science Foundation and joining the board of Viva Energy in 2018. Hill concluded his term at the Australian Strategic Policy Institute in 2021–22.

== Early life and education ==
Robert Murray Hill was born on 25 September 1946 in Adelaide, South Australia, the son of Murray Hill, a politician who served as a minister in Steele Hall's government and was a member of the Liberal Reform Party. His father also worked in real estate, which provided him with financial independence and a politically liberal upbringing. Hill was educated at Scotch College, Adelaide, and later at the University of Adelaide, where he completed a Bachelor of Arts and a Bachelor of Laws.

In September 1966, Hill's birthdate was selected in the national service ballot. He received a deferral while studying law, and after graduation he reported to the authorities but was exempted from service on health grounds. (Note: Hill's exemption was later the subject of political scrutiny during his tenure as Minister for Defence, particularly during the Iraq War.) From 1968 he studied at the London School of Economics, where he obtained a Master of Laws, before returning to Adelaide in 1970 to practise law. National service in Australia ended in December 1972.

== Political career ==
=== Early career ===
Upon returning to South Australia, Hill practised as a barrister and solicitor. Early in his legal career, he assisted in drafting the first bill introduced into the South Australian Parliament to decriminalise homosexuality between consenting adult men. He also held a few positions within the Liberal Party, serving as chair of the South Australian Liberal Party Campaign Committee from 1975 to 1977, vice-president of the South Australian Liberal Party from 1977 to 1979, and chair of the Liberal Party Constitution Committee from 1977 to 1981.

=== Senator for South Australia (1980–1989) ===
Hill was elected to the Senate for South Australia following the 1980 Australian federal election and took his seat on 1 July 1981, succeeding Condor Laucke. During his time in the Senate, he served on several committees, including the Legislative and General Purpose Standing Committee on Constitutional and Legal Affairs from 25 August 1981 to 5 June 1987, the Standing Committee on the Parliamentary Library from 25 August 1981 to 4 February 1983, Estimates Group E from 26 August 1981 to 10 September 1982, the Joint Standing Committee on Foreign Affairs and Defence from 23 September 1981 to 5 June 1987, the Select Committee on South West Tasmania from 24 September 1981 to 20 April 1983, the Standing Committee on the Scrutiny of Bills from 19 November 1981 to 4 February 1983, and Estimates Group A from 9 September 1982 to 21 August 1986.

Hill was re-elected during the 1983 Australian federal election. He served as a delegate to the South Pacific Conference in the Northern Mariana Islands from September to October 1983 and to the 30th Commonwealth Parliamentary Association Conference in the Isle of Man from September to October 1984. He was a member of the Joint Statutory Committee on the National Crime Authority from 11 October 1984 to 26 October 1984. Hill held party positions as President of the Liberal Party in South Australia from 1985 to 1987 and as a member of the Liberal Party Federal Executive from 1985 to 1987. He was also a member of the National Library of Australia Council from 22 February 1985 to 21 November 1989 and served as a delegate to the United Nations General Assembly in the United States from September to December 1986. Additionally, he served on Senate Estimates committees, including Estimates Group E from 24 March 1987 to 3 April 1987 and Estimates Group C from 31 March 1987 to 29 April 1987.

Following the release of the election results, Hill was one of four senators to be re-elected in the 1987 Australian federal election and given a three-year term. He served on several Senate and joint committees, including the Legislative and General Purpose Standing Committee on Legal and Constitutional Affairs from 24 September 1987 to 7 May 1990, the Standing Committee on the Parliamentary Library from 24 September 1987 to 6 September 1989, the Joint Standing Committee on Foreign Affairs, Defence and Trade from 9 October 1987 to 19 February 1990, the Joint Statutory Committee on the National Crime Authority from 9 October 1987 to 19 February 1990, Estimates Group D from 29 September 1988 to 6 September 1989, the Joint Standing Committee on the Australian Capital Territory from 31 May 1989 to 6 September 1989, and Estimates Group B from 6 September 1989 to 7 May 1990. He held shadow ministerial roles as Shadow Minister for Justice, the Australian Capital Territory and the Status of Women from 16 September 1988 to 14 June 1989, and as Shadow Minister for Foreign Affairs from 14 June 1989 to 7 April 1993, serving in the Peacock shadow ministry from 14 June 1989 to 11 March 1996.

=== Leader of the Opposition in the Senate (1990–1996) ===
Following the 1990 Australian federal election, Hill served as a member of the Liberal Party Federal Executive from 1990 to 1993 and as Leader of the Opposition in the Senate from 11 April 1990 to 11 March 1996. He held positions on several Senate committees, including the Standing Committee on Appropriations and Staffing from 8 May 1990 to 27 January 2006, the Standing Committee on Procedure from 8 May 1990 to 20 January 2006, Estimates Group B from 24 August 1990 to 3 December 1992, and as a substitute member of Estimates Group E from 20 August 1992 to 8 February 1993. Hill held shadow ministerial roles as Shadow Minister for Defence and Public Administration from 7 April 1993 to 17 January 1994, Shadow Minister for Public Administration from 17 January 1994 to 26 May 1994, and Shadow Minister for Education, Science and Technology from 26 May 1994 to 11 March 1996. In April 1993, he served as an official observer to the Eritrean independence referendum.

In 1994, Hill was unsuccessful in seeking Liberal preselection for the House of Representatives seat of Boothby; the preselected candidate was Andrew Southcott, who subsequently won the seat. The attempt drew criticism from Liberal backbencher Rod Atkinson, who cited internal party leaks, campaigning in preselections, and shadow ministers speaking outside their portfolios as undermining trust within the party. Opposition Leader Alexander Downer, associated with the conservative wing, did not actively support Hill, a moderate, but denied any cabinet leaks had occurred and defended ministers speaking to journalists about their portfolios.

=== Minister for the Environment (1996–2001) ===
Hill was re-elected during the 1996 Australian federal election and served as Leader of the Government in the Senate from 11 March to 20 January 2006. In the first Howard ministry sworn in on 11 March, he was appointed Minister for the Environment, representing the environment, sport and territories portfolio in cabinet. Between 1996 and 1997, Hill led Australia's climate negotiations at Geneva and Kyoto, reporting to cabinet that the country faced rising emissions and international criticism; he defended Australia's position against legally binding targets while promoting domestic measures and task forces to manage greenhouse gas reductions. At the 1997 Kyoto climate conference, Hill led Australia's delegation to secure special concessions, including the "Australia clause" allowing land-use emissions to be counted, which enabled the country to meet its Kyoto target despite fossil fuel emissions rising 25–30%, a move criticised internationally for undermining climate negotiations. He was a delegate to the Australian Constitutional Convention in Canberra in February and stated in November 1998 that Australia's ratification of the Kyoto Protocol depended on the United States and major developing countries joining, while noting that Australia was on track to limit emissions growth.

=== Minister for Defence (2001–2006) ===
Hill was re-elected during the 2001 Australian federal election and, in the third Howard ministry sworn in on 26 November 2001, was appointed Minister for Defence. Later that year, on 2 December, he confirmed that Australia had contributed to the war in Afghanistan, with an advance party already deployed and the remainder of a 150-strong force arriving shortly after. Hill stated that Special Air Service Regiment (SASR) would operate under Australian command while coordinating with coalition forces, emphasising their preparedness for the mission to defeat the Taliban and disrupt al-Qaeda operations. In May 2002, he visited Bagram Airbase to oversee Australian operations and announced that Australia might maintain its deployment until the end of the year, outlining plans for additional SASR rotations and potential support for the Afghan Interim Administration. In June 2002, Hill delivered a speech reassessing Australia's defence strategy, challenging the "concentric circles" model and highlighting the likelihood of Australian Defence Force (ADF) deployments beyond national borders. In January 2003, he confirmed that plans to outsource all defence warehousing and logistics had stalled due to failed negotiations with Tenix Toll.

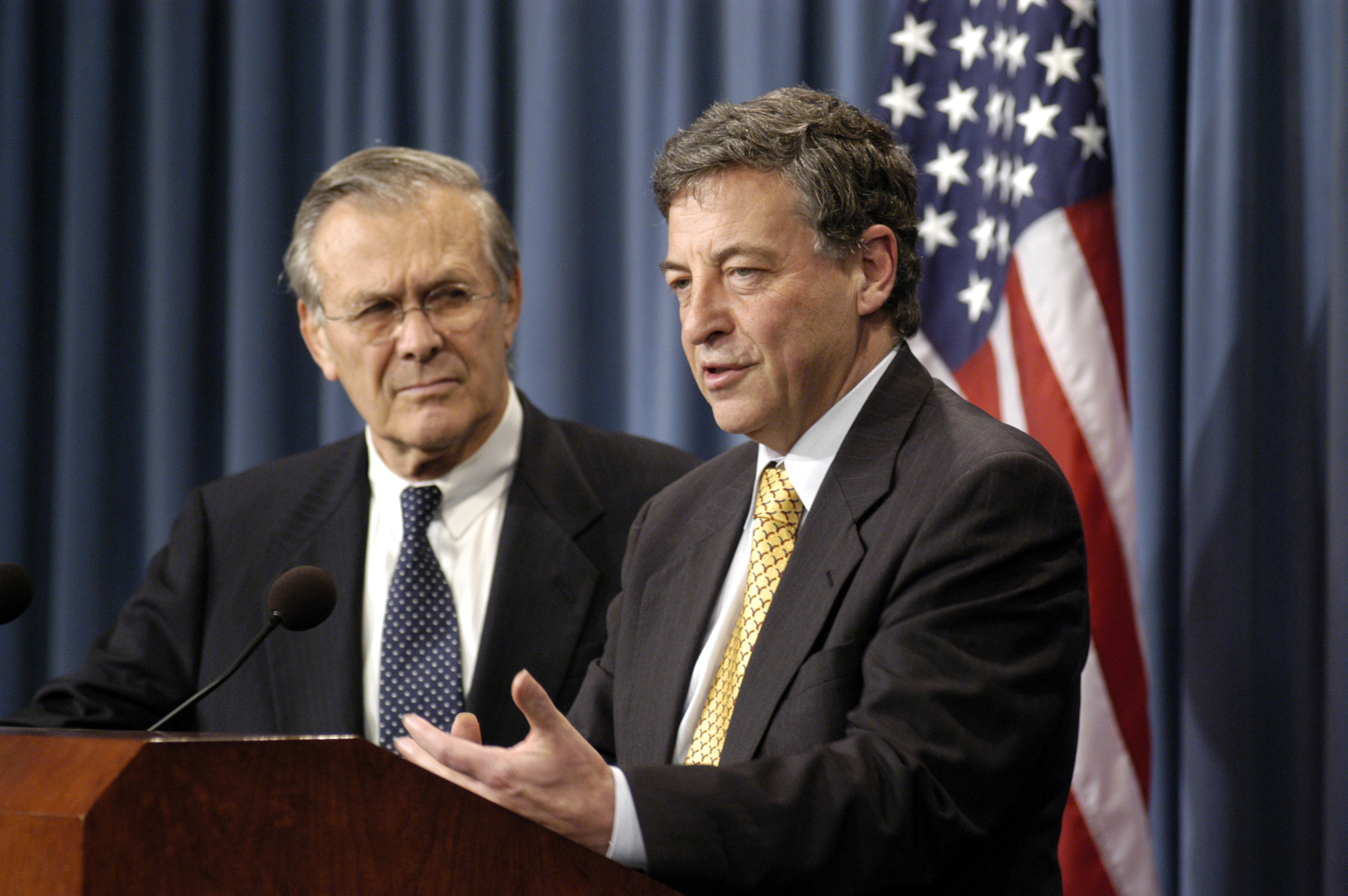
Hill (right) answering a reporter's question alongside Rumsfeld (left) at the Pentagon, 19 November 2003

In 2003, Hill supported Australia's involvement in the Iraq War based on the intelligence available at the time and advocated for transparency on cabinet deliberations, working closely with Defence officials including Chief of the Defence Force Peter Cosgrove. He later acknowledged government errors on Indigenous issues such as the Aboriginal and Torres Strait Islander Commission and the Stolen Generations. During the same period, Hill commented on the improving security situation in the Solomon Islands ahead of an Australian-led peacekeeping deployment. By 2004 and 2005, Hill faced speculation over his future, but he continued in the role, addressing operational issues in Afghanistan and reserving judgment on allegations of SASR misconduct while awaiting further information from Cosgrove. His tenure involved engagement with international partners, including United States Secretary of Defense Donald Rumsfeld, regarding coalition operations.

Hill announced his resignation from Parliament on 20 January 2006 after nearly 25 years of service, expressing gratitude to his family, staff, and Senate colleagues. Prime Minister John Howard described his departure as a "huge loss" to the government. Among his final acts in the Senate, Hill supported a bill transferring control of the abortion-inducing drug RU486 to the Therapeutic Goods Administration.

As Liberal Government Senate leader Hill had expressed the importance of the transition of the Prime Ministership from Howard to his Liberal deputy and heir apparent Peter Costello be smooth.

It was a transition that never eventuated when Howard lost government at the 2007 election and Costello refused to succeed Howard as Liberal leader.

== Later life ==
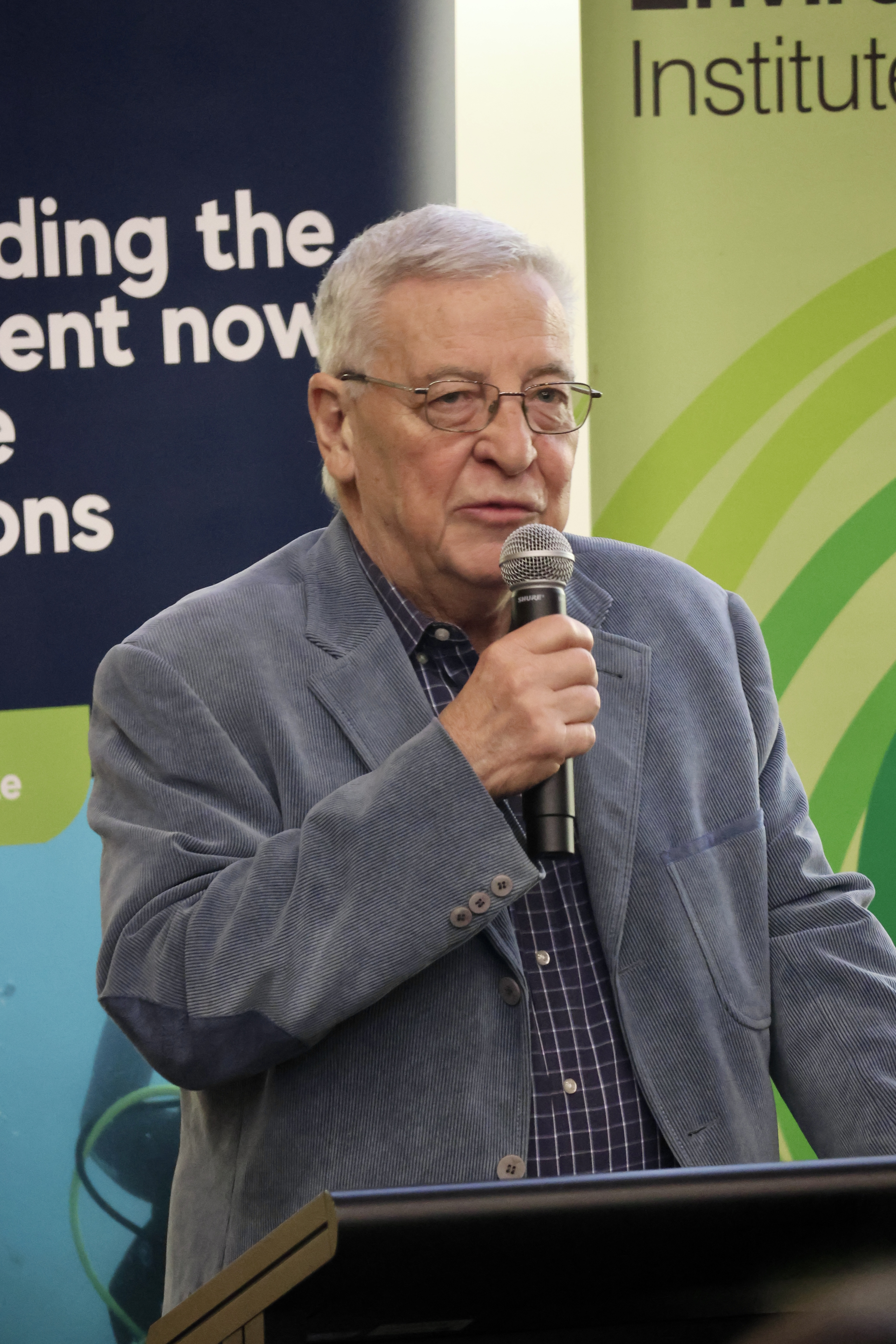
Hill delivering closing remarks at the 2025 Biodiversity Matters event

On 15 March 2006, he resigned from the Senate and, two days later, was appointed Permanent Representative of Australia to the United Nations (UN), replacing Caroline Millar. He presented his credentials in the UN headquarters on 1 May 2006 and served until May 2009. Hill's diplomatic appointment had been criticised by then Shadow Foreign Minister and future Prime Minister Kevin Rudd who had doubts about Hill's diplomatic skills and said that the Howard Government had used the diplomatic service as "a Liberal Party employment agency" and this had left diplomats without the capacity to realise their ambitions.

Hill's diplomatic appointment made upon his retirement was arranged by Foreign Minister and former Liberal leader Alexander Downer. Hill and Downer were factional rivals in South Australia, their home state and Downer was keen to see Hill out of Parliament as part of Downer's long-term plan to return to the Liberal Party leadership which never eventuated.

Despite earlier criticism from now Prime Minister Kevin Rudd regarding Hill's diplomatic skills, Hill was appointed in 2009 to chair the Carbon Trust, reflecting recognition of his international experience and expertise in energy efficiency and climate change. At the time, he was also an adjunct professor at the United States Studies Centre, contributing to research and teaching on sustainability, climate change, and environmental policy. Hill led the development of the Dow Sustainability Program at the University of Sydney, launched in February 2010 with US$2 million from The Dow Chemical Company Foundation to tackle sustainability challenges across energy, water, food, and biodiversity. He served in as the chair until January 2012.

On 9 April 2010, Hill was appointed the 15th chancellor of the University of Adelaide, with his two-year term beginning on 26 July. He was reappointed for a further two-year term on 21 February 2012, extending his leadership to July 2014. During this period, Hill joined the Advisory Board of United Against Nuclear Iran in August 2012, where CEO Mark Wallace noted his expertise in diplomatic and military matters. That year, he also joined the board of Climateworks Australia in August and attended the launch of the Cooperative Research Centre for Low Carbon Living at the University of New South Wales in December as chairman.

In 2013, Hill was appointed chair of Re.Group and served on the board of North Harbour Clean Energy, a company developing pumped hydro and vanadium battery projects to support Australia's renewable energy transition. On 11 May 2015, he was appointed to the Oversight Board monitoring the implementation of the First Principles Review recommendations for the ADF. On 28 June 2016, Hill joined the inaugural Supervisory Board of Rheinmetall Defence Australia as a non-executive director alongside John Caligari. In 2017, he became chairman of the NSW Biodiversity Conservation Trust Board and also served on the Asia Pacific Board of The Nature Conservancy and as a governor of WWF-Australia. In 2018, Hill was reported as a member of a high-level group examining Commonwealth reform, and he was appointed to head the Antarctic Science Foundation, a public–private partnership focused on research, conservation, and education, while also joining the board of Viva Energy as an Independent non-executive director and chairman in June 2018.

Hill stepped down as chair of the Antarctic Science Foundation in 2019, succeeded by Katherine Woodthorpe. He concluded his term on the Australian Strategic Policy Institute Council during 2021–22, where he had contributed to governance and strategic oversight. In November 2023, Hill joined a campaign led by Sophie Scamps calling for a national ban on native forest logging in Australia, arguing for the conservation of remaining native forests to protect biodiversity and emphasising that those affected by the ban should receive support.

== Personal life ==
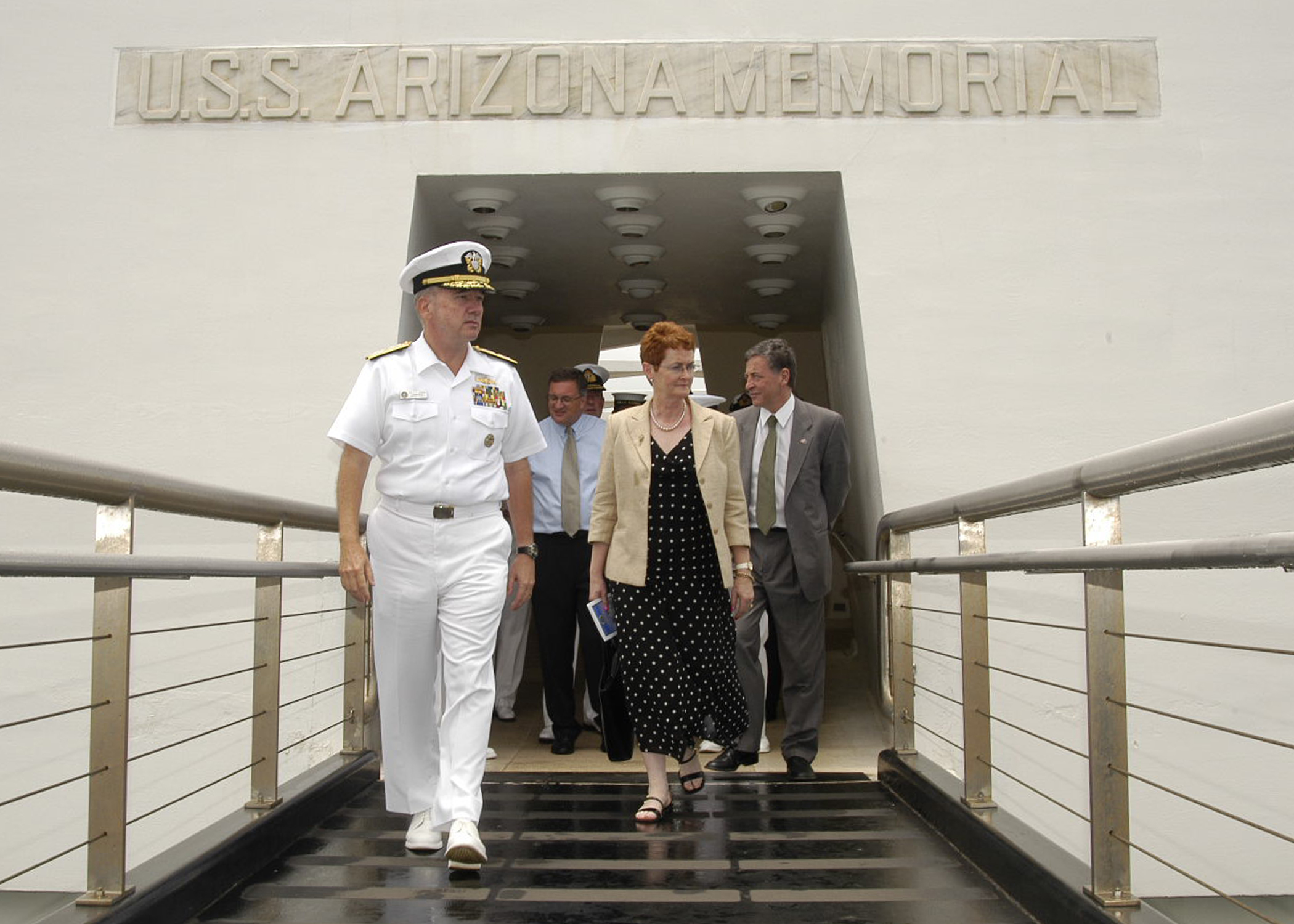
Hill (right) and his wife Diana (middle) tour the USS Arizona Memorial with Walter Doran in Pearl Harbor during RIMPAC 2004

Hill is married to Diana Marie Jacka, who has served as president of UNICEF Australia and is a psychologist with experience working with children in juvenile detention and with intellectual or physical disabilities. They have four children, two sons and two daughters, including their daughter Victoria, an Adelaide-based actress. Outside politics, Hill has pursued interests in history and winemaking.

== Honours ==
Hill has received several honours in recognition of his public service. On 1 January 2001, he was awarded the Centenary Medal for service as Minister for Defence. On 11 June 2012, he was named a Companion of the Order of Australia for eminent service to the Parliament of Australia, particularly through policy reform in the environment and defence portfolios, and for his contributions to Australia's international relations through senior diplomatic representation to the UN. He was awarded a Doctor of Laws honoris causa by the University of Adelaide on 29 April 2015 and a Doctor of Political Science honoris causa by the University of Queensland in 2017.

== Notes ==
Parliament of Australia
Preceded by Sir Condor Laucke	Senator for South Australia; 1986–2006	Succeeded by Cory Bernardi
Party political offices
Preceded by Fred Chaney	Leader of the Liberal Party in the Senate; 1990–2006	Succeeded by Nick Minchin
Political offices
Preceded by John Faulkner as Minister for the Environment, Sport and Territories	Minister for the Environment; 1996–1998	Succeeded by Himself
Preceded by Himself as Minister for the Environment	Minister for the Environment and Heritage; 1998–2001	Succeeded by David Kemp
Preceded by Richard Alston as Minister for the Arts	Minister for the Environment and Heritage; 1998–2001	Succeeded by David Kemp
Preceded by Peter Reith	Minister for Defence; 2001–2006	Succeeded by Brendan Nelson
Diplomatic posts
Preceded by Caroline Millar (acting)	Permanent Representative of Australia to the United Nations; 2006–2009	Succeeded by Gary Quinlan
Academic offices
Preceded by John von Doussa	15th Chancellor of the University of Adelaide; 2010–2014	Succeeded by Kevin Scarce
