= James Larsen =

Australian diplomat and bureaucrat (born 1965)

His Excellency James Larsen
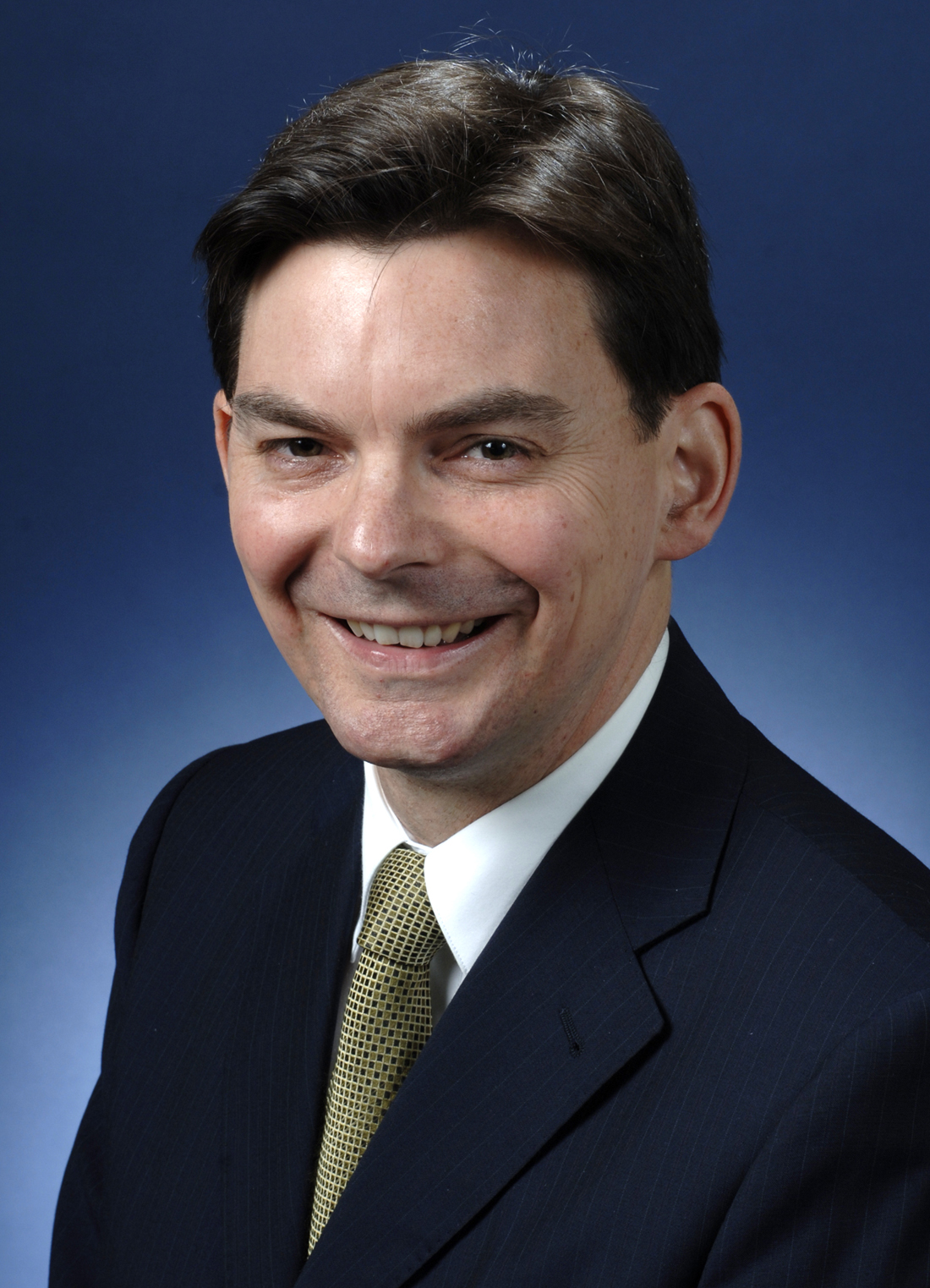
- Larsen in 2006

Ambassador and Permanent Representative of Australia to the United Nations
- Incumbent
- Assumed office 26 July 2023
- Nominated by: Anthony Albanese
- Appointed by: David Hurley
- Prime Minister: Anthony Albanese
- Preceded by: Mitch Fifield

Ambassador of Australia to Turkey
- In office 27 November 2013 – 21 June 2017
- Prime Minister: Tony Abbott; Malcolm Turnbull
- Preceded by: Ian Biggs
- Succeeded by: Marc Innes-Brown

Australian Ambassador for People Smuggling and Human Trafficking
- In office 1 March 2010 – 27 May 2012
- Prime Minister: Kevin Rudd; Julia Gillard
- Preceded by: Peter Woolcott
- Succeeded by: Craig Chittick

Ambassador of Australia to Israel
- In office 1 September 2006 – 28 February 2010
- Prime Minister: John Howard; Kevin Rudd
- Preceded by: Tim George
- Succeeded by: Andrea Faulkner

Personal details
- Born: James Martin Larsen; March 1965 (age 61) Geelong, Victoria
- Children: 3
- Education: University of Melbourne (BA, LLB)
- Occupation: Diplomat, lawyer

James Larsen (born March 1965) is an Australian diplomat and bureaucrat currently serving as the Ambassador and Permanent Representative of Australia to the United Nations. He has previously worked as the Ambassador to Turkey and the Ambassador to Israel.

== Early life and education ==
Larsen was born in Geelong, and later studied at the University of Melbourne, attaining a Bachelor of Arts and a Bachelor of Laws.

== Career ==
Before joining the Department of Foreign Affairs and Trade, Larsen worked as a commercial solicitor for MinterEllison from 1988 to 1991. He joined DFAT in 1992, and worked as second secretary at the Australian embassy in Thailand from 1994 to 1997. Larsen was then appointed as director of the Administrative and Domestic Law Group from 1998 to 2000, before joining the Australian embassy in Belgium as counsellor. From 2004 to 2006 he was legal adviser and assistant secretary in the legal branch of DFAT. In 2006 he was appointed Ambassador to Israel. In this post, he oversaw the relocation of the Australian embassy from Europe House to South Tel Aviv. His next appointment was as Ambassador for People Smuggling Issues. He then became principal advisor to Foreign Minister Bob Carr. He served as the Ambassador to Turkey from 2014 to 2017. Larsen was only 20 m (66 ft) from the blast in the March 2016 Ankara bombing.

In 2020, he was appointed Deputy Secretary of the Department of Agriculture, Water and the Environment, and managed the industrial relations working group of the National COVID-19 Coordination Commission. In 2021, Larsen was appointed Deputy Secretary of the Department of Climate Change, Energy, the Environment and Water and climate coordinator to manage the work undertaken by DFAT and the Department of Industry, Science, Energy and Resources. Larsen's appointment as permanent representative to the UN was announced on 11 July 2023. He presented his credentials to the Secretary-General of the United Nations on 26 July 2023.

In 2023, amidst the Gaza war, Australia abstained from voting on Resolution ES-10/L.25. Larsen explained that Australia believed the resolution to be incomplete, as it did not recognise Hamas as the perpetrators of the 7 October attacks on Israel, although Australia did "agree with the central proposition, that the humanitarian situation in Gaza is dire and human suffering is widespread and unacceptable."

== Personal life ==
Larsen is married to Antoinette Merrillees, daughter of Robert Merrillees, who are also both career diplomats. They have three children.

Diplomatic posts
Preceded by Mitch Fifield	Permanent Representative of Australia to the United Nations; 2023–present	Incumbent
