= Permanent Representative of Australia to the World Trade Organization =

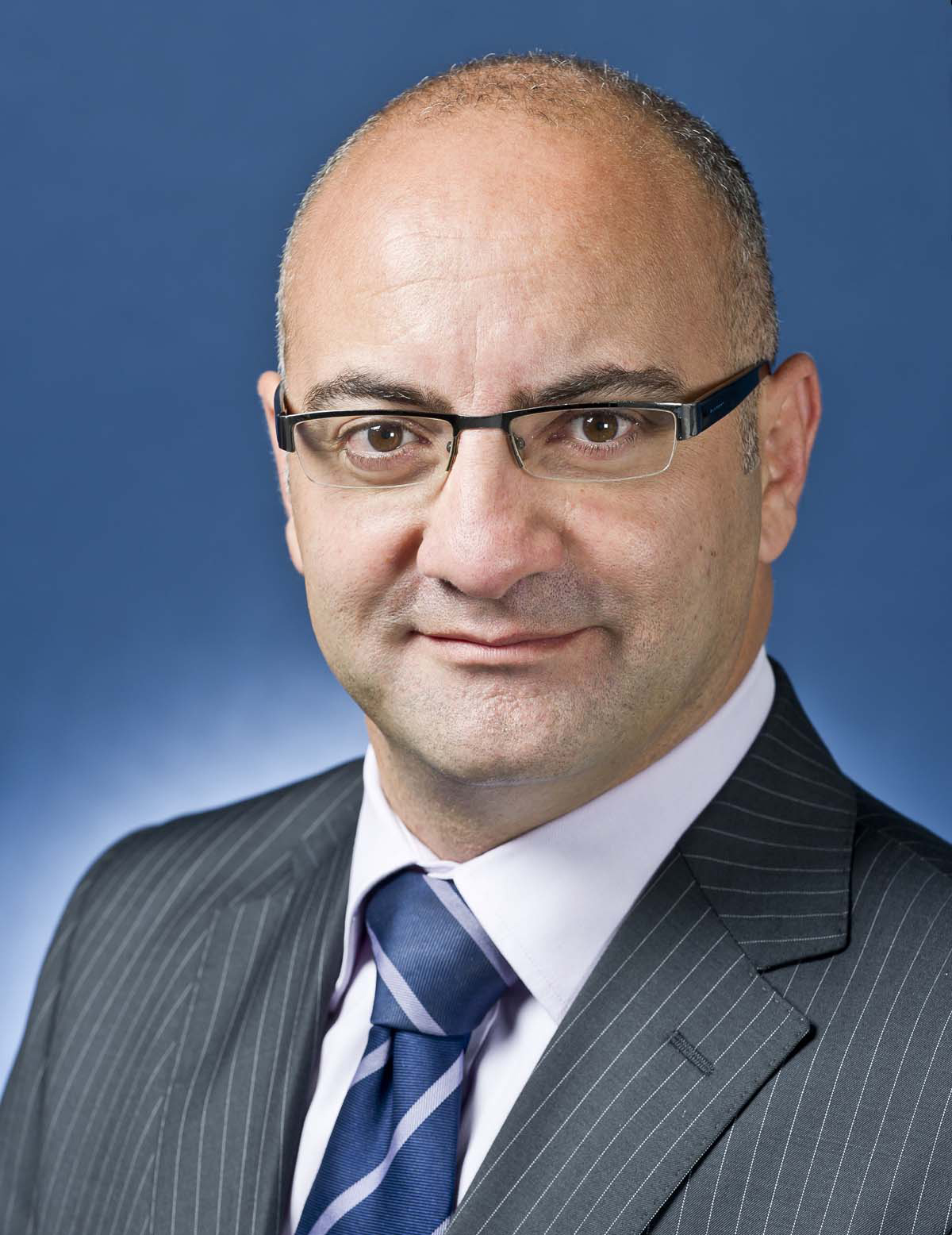
- Incumbent; George Mina since 27 October 2020
- Department of Foreign Affairs and Trade
- Style: His Excellency
- Reports to: Minister for Foreign Affairs; Minister for Trade and Tourism
- Seat: Geneva, Switzerland
- Nominator: Prime Minister of Australia
- Appointer: Governor General of Australia
- Inaugural holder: Alan Oxley (GATT); Donald Kenyon (WTO)
- Formation: 1 August 1988 (GATT); 1 November 1995 (WTO)
- Website: Australian Permanent Mission and Consulate-General, Geneva, Switzerland

The ambassador and permanent representative of Australia to the World Trade Organization is an officer of the Australian Department of Foreign Affairs and Trade and the head of the Permanent Mission of the Commonwealth of Australia to the World Trade Organization (WTO) in Geneva, Switzerland. The position has the rank and status of an ambassador extraordinary and plenipotentiary and continues Australia's representation to the General Agreement on Tariffs and Trade (GATT; 1948–1995), as a charter member joining the WTO to replace the GATT on 1 January 1995. The Permanent Mission to the WTO is based with the Australian Permanent Mission and Consulate-General in Geneva. Prior to 1973, the role of Australia's representative on the GATT was filled by the Permanent Representative of Australia to the United Nations Office in Geneva.

== Office holders ==
#	Officeholder	Title	Term start date	Term end date	Time in office	Notes
1	George Warwick Smith	Special Trade Representative, Geneva	16 January 1973	20 April 1976	3 years, 95 days	
2	J. T. Fogarty	Special Trade Representative, Geneva	January 1977	1980	2–3 years	
3	Francis Patrick Donovan	Special Trade Representative, Geneva	1980	30 August 1982	1–2 years	
4	Peter Stewart Field	Special Trade Representative, Geneva	30 August 1982	March 1985	2 years, 6 months	
5	Alan Oxley	Special Trade Representative, Geneva	March 1985	1 August 1988	4 years, 4 months	
5	Alan Oxley	Permanent Representative of Australia to the General Agreement on Tariffs and Trade	1 August 1988	July 1989	4 years, 4 months	
6	David Hawes	Permanent Representative of Australia to the General Agreement on Tariffs and Trade	July 1989	March 1993	3 years, 8 months	
7	Donald Kenyon	Permanent Representative of Australia to the General Agreement on Tariffs and Trade	March 1993	1 January 1995	3 years, 9 months	
7	Donald Kenyon	Permanent Representative of Australia to the World Trade Organization	1 January 1995	December 1996	3 years, 9 months	
8	Ted Delofski	Permanent Representative of Australia to the World Trade Organization	11 December 1996	December 1997	11 months	
9	Geoff Raby	Permanent Representative of Australia to the World Trade Organization	January 1998	August 2001	3 years, 7 months	
10	David Spencer	Permanent Representative of Australia to the World Trade Organization	August 2001	August 2005	4 years	
11	Bruce Gosper	Permanent Representative of Australia to the World Trade Organization	August 2005	19 December 2008	3 years, 4 months	
12	Peter Grey	Permanent Representative of Australia to the World Trade Organization	19 December 2008	1 March 2010	1 year, 2 months	
13	Tim Yeend	Permanent Representative of Australia to the World Trade Organization	1 March 2010	June 2013	3 years, 3 months	
14	Hamish McCormick	Permanent Representative of Australia to the World Trade Organization	25 June 2013	December 2016	3 years, 5 months	
15	Frances Lisson	Permanent Representative of Australia to the World Trade Organization	January 2017	27 October 2020	3 years, 9 months	
16	George Mina	Permanent Representative of Australia to the World Trade Organization	27 October 2020	Incumbent	6 years, 20 days	
