= Koala (company) =

Australian furniture company

- Type: Public
- Traded as: ASX: KOA
- Industry: Furniture
- Founded: November 2015 in Australia
- Founder: Dany Milham; Mitch Taylor
- Headquarters: Sydney, Australia
- Area served: Australia; Japan; United States
- Products: Bed in a box
- Website: koala.com

Koala is an Australian company selling mattresses and other furniture under a direct-to-consumer model. It was founded in November 2015 by Dany Milham and Mitch Taylor with a "mattress‑in‑a‑box" model that sold compressed foam mattresses online and delivered them directly to customers.

Koala is headquartered in Sydney, and operates primarily as an online retailer. The company later expanded beyond mattresses into products including sofas, sofa beds, and bases.

Koala has promoted sustainability initiatives and wildlife conservation partnerships, including a partnership with the World Wildlife Fund (Australia), with the company donating to adopt a symbolic koala for every mattress sold.

== History ==
Koala was founded in 2015 by Dany Milham and Mitch Taylor, who launched the business with a focus on online mattress sales and simplified delivery. The founders introduced a mattress compressed into a box that could be shipped directly to customers under a "bed‑in‑a‑box" retail model.

Early marketing campaigns for the mattress included demonstrations designed to show reduced motion transfer between sleepers. The company later expanded its product range beyond mattresses to include living‑room and bedroom furniture products, although it continued to be best known for its mattresses. In 2020, some manufacturing was controversially moved to China.

Co‑founder Dany Milham left the company in 2021 to start the grocery delivery startup Milkrun before returning as chief executive in 2024. Koala has expanded beyond Australia into international markets. The company launched in Japan in 2017. The company has since launched in the United States, garnering attention with its social media marketing.

In 2022, Koala was reported to be preparing for an IPO on the Australian Securities Exchange, but that effort was later abandoned. As of 2026, the company was reportedly again preparing a ASX IPO, targeting an April listing with an estimated valuation of about $300 million.

The company debuted on the Australian Securities Exchange on March 31, 2026, the float was priced at $3.40 and gained almost 12% on the first day of trading leaving the company with a market capitalisation of $340 million.

== ESG initiatives ==
The company has partnered with WWF-Australia since 2017, with a focus on koala conservation and turtle conservation in the Great Barrier Reef. The company donates 1 per cent of revenue to environmental causes, according to the Sydney Morning Herald, totaling $1,000,594 as of 2019.

== See also ==
- Direct-to-consumer
