= Cory Bernardi =

Australian politician (born 1969)

The Honourable Cory Bernardi MLC
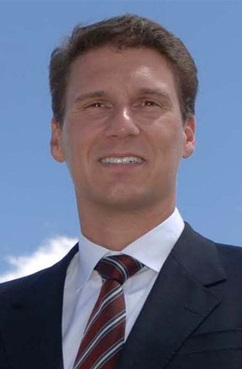
- Bernardi in 2008

Leader of One Nation South Australia
- Incumbent
- Assumed office 2 February 2026
- Preceded by: Jennifer Game

Member of the South Australian Legislative Council
- Incumbent
- Assumed office 21 March 2026
Former party offices
Leader of the Australian Conservatives
In office 7 February 2017 – 25 June 2019
Preceded by	Party established
Succeeded by	Party abolished
President of the South Australian Liberal Party
In office 1998–2000
Preceded by	Robert Lawson
Succeeded by	Alexander Downer

Senator for South Australia
- In office 4 May 2006 – 20 January 2020
- Preceded by: Robert Hill
- Succeeded by: Andrew McLachlan

Personal details
- Born: 6 November 1969 (age 57) Adelaide, South Australia
- Party: One Nation (since 2026)
- Other political affiliations: Liberal (until 2017); Australian Conservatives (2017–2019); Independent (2019–2026)
- Education: South Australian Institute of Technology; Australian Institute of Sport; Heriot-Watt University; Edinburgh Business School
- Profession: Businessman; Politician

Cory Bernardi (born 6 November 1969) is an Australian politician who has been the leader of One Nation South Australia and a member of the South Australian Legislative Council (MLC) since March 2026. Formerly a member of the Liberal Party, he served as a federal senator for South Australia from 2006 to 2020. Bernardi left the Liberal Party in 2017 to found and lead the Australian Conservatives, a minor political party which was disbanded in 2019. He led One Nation into the 2026 South Australian state election, winning a seat in the Legislative Council as the party achieved its best result in the state.

A social and economic conservative, Bernardi opposes same-sex marriage, abortion, and the Australian Broadcasting Corporation, holds anti-Islam views, denies the scientific consensus on climate change, and has advocated for nuclear power. He attracted controversy in 2012 for suggesting that legalising same-sex marriage could lead to polygamy and bestiality.

== Early life and education ==
Cory Bernardi was born in Adelaide, South Australia, on 6 November 1969. His father was an Italian immigrant who migrated to Australia in 1958. His maternal grandfather was a trade unionist and Labor supporter.

Bernardi was educated at Prince Alfred College, where he was introduced to rowing. After leaving school, he took a business and management course at the South Australian Institute of Technology, an on-campus pathway provider for the University of South Australia.

After a back injury ended his rowing career, Bernardi travelled through Europe and Africa, working as a labourer. Returning to Australia, he managed the family's hotel before spending four months in a hospital with tuberculosis. He subsequently worked as a stockbroker and financial adviser before entering politics.

== Rowing career ==
Bernardi made state representative appearances for South Australia in the State Youth VIII at the Australian Rowing Championships in 1987 and 1988. In 1988, as part of a Mercantile Rowing Club eight, he won the Ladies' Challenge Plate at the Henley Royal Regatta in England.

In 1989, Bernardi was selected for the seventh seat of the South Australian Men's Senior VIII. However, the national interstate events that year were cancelled when a cyclone hit the Wellington Dam course in Western Australia, part-way through the program of events. Three weeks later at Carrum in Victoria, Bernardi's South Australian crew placed second in an unofficial men's eight race attended by the Victorian, Western Australian, and South Australian crews who raced for the Patten Cup. That same year Bernardi became an Australian national representative when he was selected in the three-seat of the coxless four. He competed at the 1989 World Rowing Championships in Bled, Yugoslavia (now the Republic of Slovenia). He and the crew placed tenth. Later that year, Bernardi suffered a back injury that effectively ended his rowing career.

== Career ==
=== Liberal Party ===
Bernardi entered politics in 2006 when he was selected by the Liberal Party to fill a Senate seat vacancy for South Australia, left by the resignation of Robert Hill. During his time in Parliament, Bernardi attracted controversy over several statements and views.

==== Elections to the Senate ====
After South Australian Senator Robert Hill resigned from the Senate to become Ambassador to the United Nations in March 2006, Bernardi was selected by the Liberal Party to fill the vacancy, officially commencing his Senate term on 4 May 2006. On 17 February 2007, Bernardi was pre-selected ahead of Simon Birmingham and Senator Grant Chapman by the State Council of the South Australian Liberal Party to the top position on the South Australian Liberal Senate ticket for the federal election to be held in late 2007. At the election, Bernardi was elected to a full six-year term. He was again given the first place on the Liberal ticket at the 2013 federal election and was re-elected. Following a double dissolution of Parliament at the 2016 federal election, Bernardi was re-elected from the second place on the Liberal ticket. He was elected for a term of six years, ending on 30 June 2022.

==== Opposition under Brendan Nelson: 2007–2008 ====
In December 2007, Bernardi was appointed the federal Coalition's Shadow Parliamentary Secretary for Families and Community Services. On 19 March 2008, Bernardi was named in a story published in The Australian newspaper as having been linked to a scheme that sold financial advice on how divorcees could hide money from their former spouses. In a media statement released shortly after the article was published, Bernardi described the story as "a rehash of a factually incorrect story that first appeared in 2006 before my appointment to the Senate." Bernardi claimed that he had been "made aware that a colleague [had] been approaching numerous journalists in an attempt to 'push' this matter as a means of personally attacking me." In a statement, he went on to say, "I find it disappointing that there are people who clearly pine to background journalists with half-truths and mischievous suggestions in an attempt to smear others. The people who creep out of their darkened closets to resurrect previously discredited accusations do no service to themselves or the community. Politics is a battle of ideas, not a battle of smears."

On 20 March 2008, Bernardi introduced a motion calling for a Senate inquiry into swearing on television and the effectiveness of the Code of Practice after a television show was broadcast at 8.30 pm containing the word "fuck" eighty times in 40 minutes. The Senate supported the motion. Then in June, Bernardi stated his personal view on onlineopinion.com.au regarding a proposed reform relating to same-sex relationships. He stated, "Same-sex relationships are not the same as marital relationships and to treat them the same is to suspend common sense". A month later, Bernardi questioned the ethics of granting human rights to great apes while ignoring the rights of the unborn child on the ABC "Unleashed" website.

In August 2008, the Herald Sun newspaper reported that the Federal Parliamentary Library had, following a request from Bernardi, identified a loophole in government legislation that allowed some women who aborted their pregnancies to claim a $5,000 "baby bonus". The Government later stated that the bonus was not available for aborted pregnancies and was committed to following up on any such occurrences.

==== Opposition under Malcolm Turnbull: 2008–2009 ====
In September 2008, new federal Liberal leader Malcolm Turnbull appointed Bernardi the Coalition Spokesman for Disabilities, Carers and the Voluntary Sector. In October, Bernardi caused a stir with a speech to the Senate against the Same-Sex Relationships (Equal Treatment in Commonwealth Laws-Superannuation) Bill 2008 supported by the Liberal Party. The bill led to discontent within the party's conservative faction—of which Bernardi was a key figure. Turnbull was "unhappy that Party authority was being challenged" by Bernardi. In Bernardi's speech, he complained that society should not "throw open the doors and welcome into the fold those whose relationships are uncharacteristic of the most basic elements of a marital union." The next morning, Turnbull rang Bernardi to "chip him", having felt the speech was intemperate in tone and that it went against the party line and Turnbull's own leadership.

Bernardi was removed from the Shadow Ministry by Turnbull in February 2009 after reportedly making unsubstantiated and damaging claims regarding an unidentified fellow Liberal MP in his weekly blog. The MP involved was thought to be Christopher Pyne, who denied the allegations as "preposterous".

==== Opposition under Tony Abbott: 2009–2013 ====
Following the election of Tony Abbott as the leader of the federal Liberal Party in late 2009, Bernardi was appointed Shadow Parliamentary Secretary Assisting the Leader of the Opposition and Shadow Parliamentary Secretary for Infrastructure and Population Policy, and in August 2012 was appointed Deputy Manager of Opposition Business in the Senate. In September 2012, Bernardi resigned from his position as parliamentary secretary as a result of statements he had made the day before, when he argued that permitting same-sex marriages would lead to legalised polygamy and bestiality.

==== Abbott and Turnbull governments: 2013–2017 ====
In January 2014, Prime Minister Tony Abbott again distanced himself from Bernardi after the latter called for a new debate on abortion, called for more flexible industrial relations laws, stated his belief in the primacy of the traditional family and claimed that non-traditional families may cause negative social outcomes, linked a secular polity with Australia having lost its way, and claimed that Christianity was under siege from both the political Greens and Islam.

Bernardi was re-elected for a six-year term in the Senate at the July 2016 election.

In September 2016, Bernardi spoke in favour of the repeal of section 18C of the Racial Discrimination Act, which prohibits speech that is reasonably likely to "offend, insult, humiliate or intimidate on the basis of race, colour or national or ethnic origin". In December 2016, Bernardi had a public disagreement with former Prime Minister Tony Abbott over reports that Bernardi may start his own party.

In the same month, it was reported that Bernardi had in 2009 set up an entity called the Conservative Leadership Foundation, "a fundraising entity that inhabits a grey area in the political donations system and permits gifts from foreign donors." and that "it has never made a disclosure to the Australian Electoral Commission as an associated entity, nor disclosed any political expenditure."

=== Australian Conservatives ===
On 7 February 2017, seven months after the 2016 election, Bernardi left the Liberal Party to form a separate party, the Australian Conservatives, which was born out of Bernardi's Australian Conservatives movement. The Australian Conservatives movement was formed by Bernardi in July 2016 to "unite conservatives", and by August claimed 50,000 members.

In June 2019, Bernardi announced that he was disbanding the Australian Conservatives and the party was voluntarily deregistered by the Australian Electoral Commission on 25 June 2019. He cited a poor result in the 2019 Australian federal election, and said that the removal of Turnbull as prime minister meant that his supporters would return to the Liberal Party.

Bernardi announced his resignation from politics on 19 November 2019, and on 20 January 2020, he resigned from the Senate with immediate effect. Because he was elected as a member of the Liberal Party, a member of that party would fill the vacancy caused by his resignation. The former President of the South Australian Legislative Council, Andrew McLachlan, filled Bernardi's vacancy on 6 February 2020.

After leaving the Senate, Bernardi became a commentator and podcaster with Sky News Australia.

=== One Nation ===
In February 2026, Bernardi joined One Nation and announced that he would run for a Legislative Council seat in the 2026 South Australian state election in the lead position.

On 3 March 2026 he posted a video to social media expressing frustration over a sign at Adelaide University reading "Niina Marni", which means "hello, how are you?" in the language of the Kaurna people, the original inhabitants and traditional owners of Adelaide and the Adelaide Plains. Bernardi said he did not know what the phrase meant, and suggested that few others did either, calling the sign "empty symbolism... trying to erase our history". He also reiterated his view that same-sex marriage leads to bestiality.

At the 2026 state election, Bernardi was elected to the Legislative Council, and will serve an eight-year term. One of his stated policies is to abolish the South Australian Voice to Parliament, which was established in 2023.

== Political views ==
Prior to forming the Australian Conservatives, Bernardi was a member of the right-wing National Right faction of the Liberal Party.

=== Global warming ===
On 21 April 2007, Bernardi published an essay questioning whether global warming was caused by human activities. Environment Minister Malcolm Turnbull and other Liberal parliamentarians promptly distanced themselves from his views.

=== Islam ===
Bernardi has been publicly critical of Islam. In 2010, he wrote an opinion piece calling for a ban on wearing the burqa in public.

In 2011, Bernardi termed it "wrong" for the government to pay for funeral expenses for asylum-seekers. He also said that "Islam itself is the problem—it's not Muslims", and that multiculturalism had failed. He later clarified his view, saying that it was "the fundamentalist Islamic approach of changing laws and values does not have my support". Liberal leader Tony Abbott distanced himself from the comments.

Bernardi has shared values with Dutch anti-Islam politician Geert Wilders, whom he met while on a trip to Europe. Bernardi offered to assist Wilders in a visit to Australia but, in February 2013, when Wilders did come, Bernardi did not meet with him. Wilders stated in an interview that Bernardi's decision not to meet him was a "sad but true" reflection on politics, particularly in an election year.

In September 2016, Bernardi proposed that the Turnbull government take up a modified version of the immigration policy of Pauline Hanson's One Nation, aiming to mollify people fearing Muslim immigration, as he felt soft immigration policies were to blame for a fall in government support. In February 2017, he attracted criticism for speaking at the Q Society of Australia.The event received protesters who called the event "racist".

=== Publicly funded broadcasting ===
In 2013 Bernardi expressed his concern over the effect of Australia's public broadcaster, the Australian Broadcasting Corporation, on commercial operators. His view was that the ABC had grown beyond its initial charter and its size was unjustifiably encroaching into the online news sphere at the expense of commercial operators and media diversity. However, he supported the continued existence of ABC iView and ABC podcasting services, and agreed that the ABC provides useful services to regional areas often under-serviced by commercial operators.

=== Same-sex marriage ===
Bernardi has said that permitting same-sex marriages would lead to legalised polygamy and bestiality, and said that the "safe schools program" designed to make homosexual children feel safer at school "bullies" heterosexual children. Several of his colleagues from the Liberal Party at the time distanced themselves from Bernardi's comments, including Tony Abbott, who also opposes same-sex marriage. Bernardi was one of twelve senators who voted against what became the Marriage Amendment (Definition and Religious Freedoms) Act 2017.

=== Abortion ===
Bernardi is anti-abortion, saying those who support it are "pro death". On 16 November 2017, Bernardi moved a motion in the Senate to ban abortion on gender grounds. He was one of the 10 senators who voted in favour of the motion, which was defeated 10 votes to 36.

=== Nuclear industrial development ===
Bernardi supports the legalisation of nuclear fuel cycle activities in Australia which, as of November 2017, are prohibited under the Environment Protection and Biodiversity Conservation Act 1999 and the Australian Radiation Protection and Nuclear Safety Act 1998. In November 2017, he presented the Nuclear Fuel Cycle (Facilitation) Bill in the Senate to repeal these prohibitions, effectively enabling future proposals for activities such as: nuclear waste importation, storage and disposal, nuclear power generation, further processing of uranium and the reprocessing of spent nuclear fuel.

== Publications ==
Bernardi is the author of The Conservative Revolution, published in 2013.

== Criticism ==
On 28 September 2015, Tony Jones, host of the television program Q&A on ABC, referred to "Cory Bernardi's Golden Dawn or something" in the context of the prospect of Bernardi forming his own political party. The Greek political party Golden Dawn has been characterised as neo-fascist. ABC later stated that the words were intended only as shorthand for a new conservative party and not to suggest that Bernardi shared the views of Golden Dawn.

In February 2016, Labor Opposition Leader Bill Shorten labelled Bernardi a "homophobe". In March, student protesters trashed Bernardi's Adelaide office and wrote slogans such as "stop homophobia" after Bernardi raised concerns about the content of the Safe Schools Program. Bernardi claimed the program was indoctrinating minors.

Bernardi was criticised for comments regarding the role of women in the military. Liberal Senator Linda Reynolds called Bernardi a "disgrace" in response to Bernardi's condemnation of women seeking combat roles in the military.

== Personal life ==
Bernardi and his Irish-born wife Sinéad, an economics graduate, have two sons.
