= John Dauth =

Australian public servant and diplomat

John Dauth AO, LVO, OBE
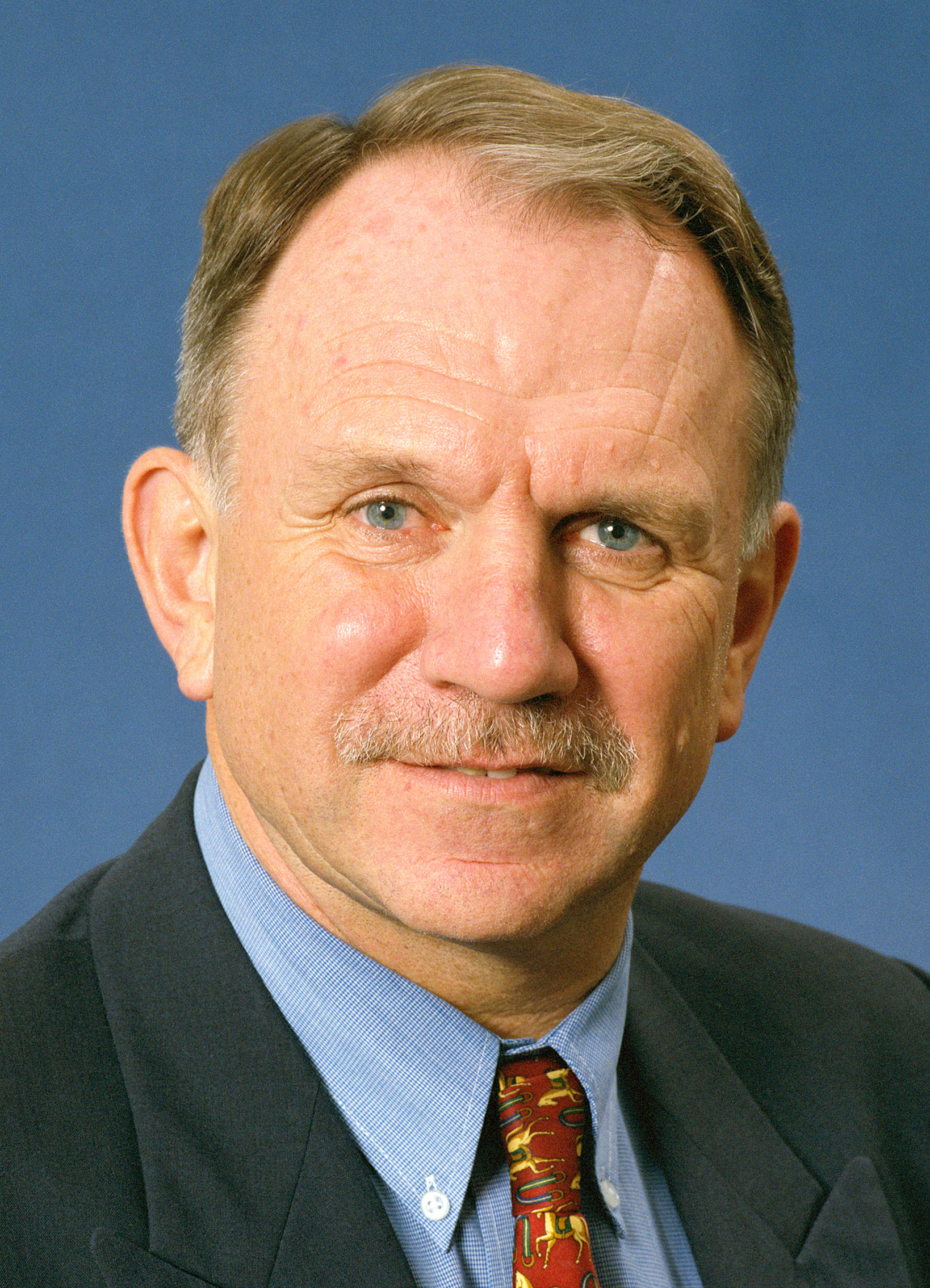

Australian High Commissioner to the United Kingdom
- In office September 2008 – 23 August 2012
- Preceded by: Richard Alston
- Succeeded by: Mike Rann

Personal details
- Born: John Cecil Dauth; 9 April 1947 (age 79) Brisbane, Queensland, Australia
- Domestic partner: Richard Glynn
- Education: The University of Sydney
- Occupation: Public servant, diplomat

John Cecil Dauth, AO, LVO, OBE (born 9 April 1947) is an Australian public servant and diplomat. He was the Australian High Commissioner to the United Kingdom from 2008 to 2013.

== Career ==
Dauth was born in Brisbane, Queensland. Graduating from the University of Sydney with a Bachelor of Arts degree, he joined the Australian Public Service in the Department of External Affairs in 1969, and was seconded to Buckingham Palace between 1977 and 1980, serving in the Press Office of the Royal Household as Assistant Press Secretary to Queen Elizabeth II and Press Secretary to the Prince of Wales.

Dauth has served in a number of positions overseas including: Nigeria (Second Secretary, 1970–1972); Tutor in Residence at Burgmann College, Australian National University (1974–1975); Iran (Chargé d'affaires, 1983–1985); and New Caledonia (Consul-General, 1986–1987). He later served as High Commissioner to New Zealand (2006–2008). Prior to this he was Permanent Representative to the United Nations (2001–2006) and High Commissioner to Malaysia (1993–1996). He was the Consul-General in New Caledonia from 1986 to 1987 before being declared persona non-grata by the French government after Paris complained that he was too close to the Kanak pro-independence movement. In 2008, the then Prime Minister of Australia, Kevin Rudd, appointed Dauth as Australian High Commissioner to the United Kingdom, succeeding Richard Alston. Mike Rann succeeded Dauth on 1 February 2013.

== Personal life ==
Dauth is in a same-sex relationship with his partner, Richard Glynn.

== Honours ==
Dauth was appointed Lieutenant of the Royal Victorian Order (LVO) in 1980 for service as Australian Press Secretary to the Queen during the 1980 Royal Visit to Australia, Officer of the Order of Australia (AO) in 2011 for distinguished service to international relations through the advancement of Australia's diplomatic, trade and cultural relationships, particularly with the United Kingdom and New Zealand, and through contributions to the United Nations, and Officer of the Order of the British Empire (OBE) in the 2022 Birthday Honours for voluntary service to the British Red Cross.

Diplomatic posts
Preceded by William Fisher as Charge d’Affaires ad interim	Australian Charge d’Affaires ad interim to Iran; 1983–1985	Succeeded by John Lander as Ambassador
Preceded by Stuart Hume	Australian Consul-General in Noumea; 1986–1987	Succeeded by Malcolm Leader (acting)
Preceded by Frank Murray	Australian High Commissioner to Malaysia; 1993–1996	Succeeded by Bill Farmer
Preceded by Penelope Wensley	Permanent Representative of Australia to the United Nations; 2001–2006	Succeeded by Caroline Millar (acting)
Preceded by Allan Hawke	Australian High Commissioner to New Zealand; 2006–2008	Succeeded by Paul O'Sullivan
Preceded by Richard Alston	Australian High Commissioner to the United Kingdom; 2008–2013	Succeeded by Mike Rann
