= Mitch Fifield =

Australian politician (born 1967)

The Honourable Mitch Fifield
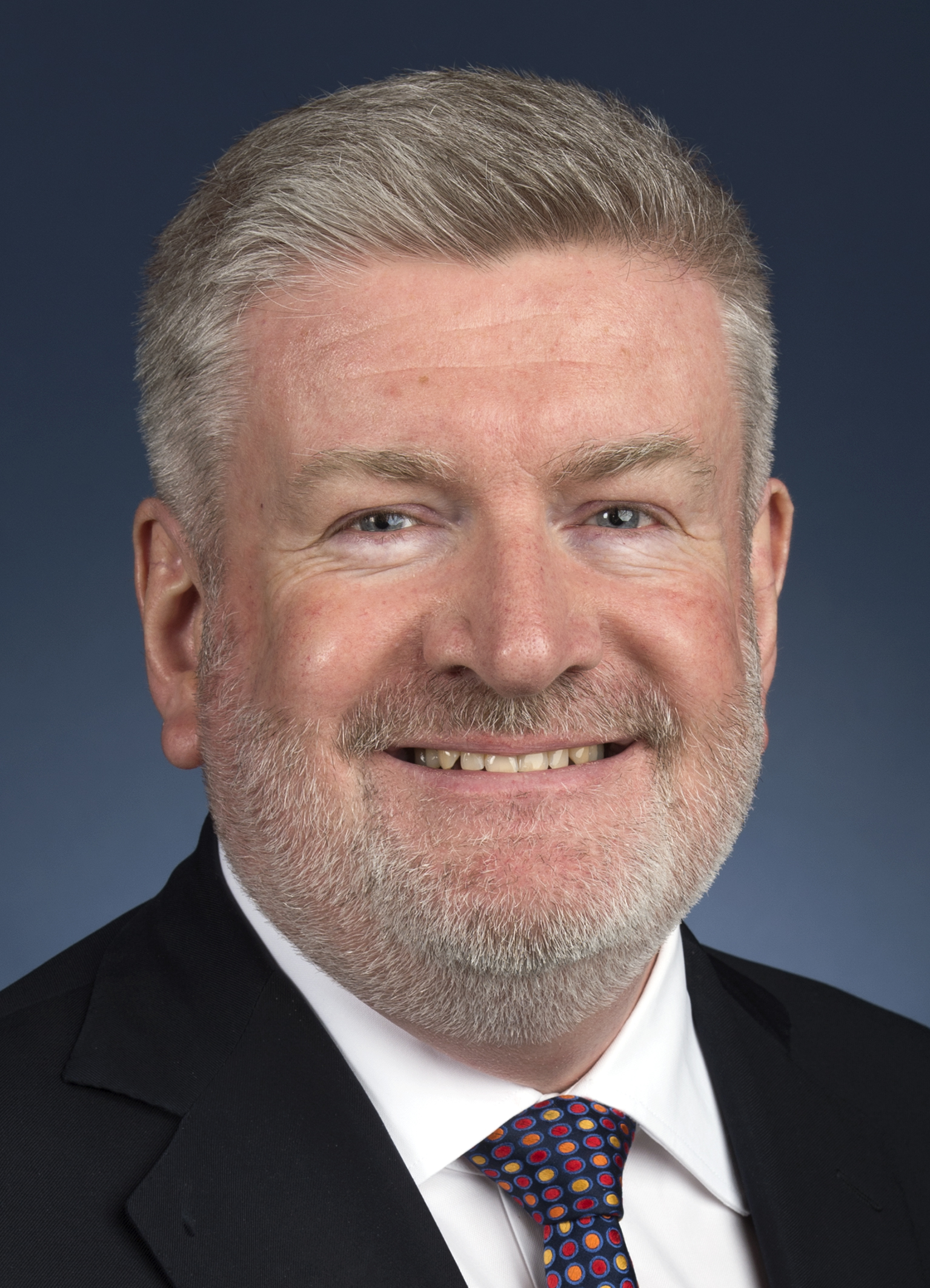

Permanent Representative of Australia to the United Nations
- In office 17 October 2019 – 1 July 2023
- Nominated by: Scott Morrison
- Appointed by: David Hurley
- Preceded by: Gillian Bird
- Succeeded by: James Larsen

Minister for Communications
- In office 21 September 2015 – 29 May 2019
- Prime Minister: Malcolm Turnbull; Scott Morrison
- Preceded by: Malcolm Turnbull
- Succeeded by: Paul Fletcher

Minister for the Arts
- In office 21 September 2015 – 29 May 2019
- Prime Minister: Malcolm Turnbull; Scott Morrison
- Preceded by: George Brandis
- Succeeded by: Paul Fletcher

Deputy Government Senate Leader
- In office 20 December 2017 – 23 August 2018
- Prime Minister: Malcolm Turnbull
- Leader: Mathias Cormann
- Preceded by: Mathias Cormann
- Succeeded by: Simon Birmingham

Manager of Government Business in the Senate
- In office 18 September 2013 – 20 December 2017
- Prime Minister: Tony Abbott; Malcolm Turnbull
- Preceded by: Jacinta Collins
- Succeeded by: Simon Birmingham

Senator for Victoria
- In office 31 March 2004 – 16 August 2019
- Preceded by: Richard Alston
- Succeeded by: Sarah Henderson

Personal details
- Born: Mitchell Peter Fifield; 16 January 1967 (age 59) Sydney, New South Wales, Australia
- Party: Liberal
- Profession: Policy advisor
- Website: www.mitchfifield.com

Mitchell Peter Fifield (born 16 January 1967) is an Australian politician and diplomat who last served as the Permanent Representative of Australia to the United Nations. He previously served as a Senator for Victoria from 2004 to 2019, representing the Liberal Party. He was a government minister in the Abbott, Turnbull, and Morrison governments, serving as Assistant Minister for Social Services (2013–2015), Manager of Government Business in the Senate (2013–2015), Minister for Communications (2015–2019), and Minister for the Arts (2015–2019).

== Early life and education ==
Fifield was born in Sydney, the son of two bank employees, and was educated at Barker College and the University of Sydney, where he graduated with a Bachelor of Arts. Between 1985 and 1987, Fifield served for three years in the Australian Army Reserve Psychology Corps.

Between 1988 and 1992, Fifield was a Senior Research Officer for the NSW Minister for Transport and Sydney's Olympic Bid, Bruce Baird; a Shadow Parliamentary Secretary for Industrial Relations' Policy Adviser, National's MP John Anderson during 1992; a Senior Policy Adviser to the Victorian Minister for Transport, Alan Brown from 1992 to 1996; and Senior Political Adviser to the Federal Treasurer, Peter Costello, from 1996 to 2003.

Since 1996, Fifield held a number of Liberal Party positions, including being a delegate to the Liberal Party Victorian State Council, since 1996; a delegate to the Liberal Party Policy Assembly, in 1996 and since 2004; a delegate to the Liberal Party Goldstein Electorate Council, between 1995 and 2003.

== Parliamentary career ==
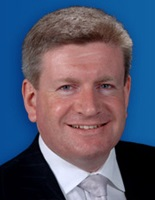
Fifield during his parliamentary career

On 31 March 2004, Fifield was appointed by the Parliament of Victoria under section 15 of the Australian Constitution to fill the casual vacancy in the Australian Senate caused by the resignation in February 2004 of Richard Alston. Fifield was re-elected at the 2007 federal election. After the 2010 election, Fifield was appointed the Shadow Minister for Disabilities, Carers and the Voluntary Sector and Manager of Opposition Business in the Senate.

Throughout his political career, Fifield has been an advocate of voluntary student unionism, as well as allowing women to serve on the front lines of the Australian Defence Force. Along with Andrew Robb, he is the co-publisher of The Party Room, a journal designed to promote new policy discussion within the Federal Coalition. Fifield has opposed federal money being spent on cycling infrastructure, and objected to part of the Rudd government's $42 billion stimulus package being used for new cycleways and home insulation: "I don't think Bradford batts and bike paths is serious economic infrastructure. Call me crazy, but I don't think it is."

Following the 2013 federal election Fifield was appointed to the Abbott Ministry as the Assistant Minister for Social Services and the Manager of Government Business in the Senate.

Fifield replaced the 29th Australian Prime Minister, Malcolm Turnbull, as Minister for Communications, in September 2015.

Fifield offered his resignation from the frontbench on 22 August 2018, during the events of the Liberal Party of Australia leadership spill. On 28 August he was reappointed to the same portfolio by Turnbull's successor, Scott Morrison.

== Permanent Representative to the United Nations ==
In May 2019, following the Coalition's victory at the 2019 federal election, it was announced that Fifield would be appointed to succeed Gillian Bird as Permanent Representative of Australia to the United Nations. He stepped down from cabinet as a result, and resigned from the Senate on 16 August 2019. On 8 September, the Liberal Party preselected Sarah Henderson, the former MP for Corangamite to be appointed to fill the casual vacancy.

Fifield was appointed on 17 October 2019, replacing Gillian Bird as the new Permanent Representative of Australia to the UN, and presented his credentials to the UN Secretary‑General António Guterres on 22 October 2019.

== Controversy ==
Fifield was accused of "mansplaining" by the Australian senator Katy Gallagher during a debate in a Senate committee hearing regarding social services legislation, which subsequently went viral. Fifield responded, claiming it was hypocritical and sexist to reduce an opponent's statement based on gender. The resulting argument lasted several minutes with both parties accusing the other of inappropriate language unfit for public office. Ultimately, Fifield posited the use of a phrase "womansplaining" in the same context, to which Gallagher replied that mansplaining was "a term that's used".

Parliament of Australia
Preceded by Richard Alston	Senator for Victoria; 2004–2019	Succeeded by Sarah Henderson
Political offices
New ministry	Assistant Minister for Social Services; 2013–2015	Ministry abolished
Preceded by George Brandis	Minister for the Arts; 2015–2019	Succeeded by Paul Fletcher
Preceded by Malcolm Turnbull	Minister for Communications; 2015–2019	Succeeded by Paul Fletcher
Diplomatic posts
Preceded by Gillian Bird	Permanent Representative of Australia to the United Nations; 2019–2023	Succeeded by James Larsen
