= List of Australian envoys =

Australian special interests ambassadors and envoys are specially-appointed officers of Australia's Department of Foreign Affairs and Trade to represent the interests of the Commonwealth of Australia abroad on a larger scale (such as by continent) or through representing the Commonwealth's approach to various international issues. While the special interest Ambassadors-at-Large are appointed in the same manner as would a normal Ambassador Extraordinary and Plenipotentiary, they are not credentialed to any state and thus have no treaty-making powers. Special Envoys are typically appointed by the prime minister of Australia.

== Special interests ambassadors ==
=== Ambassadors for Counter-Terrorism ===
#	Officeholder	Term start date	Term end date	Time in office	Notes
1	Nick Warner	20 March 2003	14 August 2003	147 days	
2	Les Luck	14 August 2003	20 July 2006	2 years, 340 days	
3	Mike Smith	20 July 2006	5 September 2008	2 years, 47 days	
4	Bill Paterson	5 September 2008	14 March 2013	4 years, 190 days	
5	Bill Fisher	14 March 2013	18 May 2014	1 year, 65 days	
6	Miles Armitage	18 May 2014	21 July 2016	2 years, 64 days	
7	Paul Foley	21 July 2016	18 February 2021	4 years, 212 days	
8	Roger Noble	18 February 2021	9 February 2023	1 year, 356 days	
9	Richard Feakes	22 May 2023	Incumbent	3 years, 178 days	

=== Ambassadors for the Environment ===
#	Officeholder	Term start date	Term end date	Time in office	Notes
1	Sir Ninian Stephen	1989	1992	2–3 years	
2	Penelope Wensley	1992	January 1996	3–4 years	
3	Howard Bamsey	January 1996	September 1997	1 year, 8 months	
4	Meg McDonald	September 1997	November 1998	1 year, 2 months	
5	Ralph Hillman	November 1998	March 2002	3 years, 4 months	
6	Christopher Langman	March 2002	February 2004	1 year, 11 months	
7	Justin Brown	October 2004	January 2005	3 months	
8	Jan Adams	January 2005	2007	1–2 years	
Role merged with the Ambassador for Climate Change
9	Peter Woolcott	November 2014	29 February 2016	1 year, 3 months	
10	Patrick Suckling	29 February 2016	18 November 2019	3 years, 263 days	
11	Jamie Isbister	18 November 2019	Incumbent	6 years, 363 days	

=== Ambassadors for Climate Change ===
#	Officeholder	Term start date	Term end date	Time in office	Notes
1	Jan Elizabeth Adams	2007	February 2009	1–2 years	
2	Louise Hand	February 2009	13 May 2012	3 years, 3 months	
3	Justin Lee	13 May 2012	1 November 2014	2 years, 172 days	
Role merged with the Ambassador for the Environment
4	Kristin Tilley	9 November 2022	Incumbent	4 years, 7 days	

=== Ambassadors for Cyber Affairs and Critical Technology ===
#	Officeholder	Title	Term start date	Term end date	Time in office	Notes
1	Tobias Feakin	Ambassador for Cyber Affairs	10 November 2016	January 2020	10 years, 6 days	
1	Tobias Feakin	Ambassador for Cyber Affairs and Critical Technology	January 2020	December 2022	10 years, 6 days	
2	Jessica Hunter					

=== Ambassadors for Regional Health Security ===
#	Officeholder	Title	Term start date	Term end date	Time in office	Notes
1	Murray Proctor	Ambassador for HIV/AIDS	December 2007	May 2012	4 years, 5 months	
2	James Gilling	Ambassador for HIV/AIDS, Tuberculosis and Malaria	3 October 2012	13 June 2017	4 years, 253 days	
3	Blair Exell	Ambassador for Regional Health Security	13 June 2017	3 March 2020	2 years, 264 days	
4	Stephanie Williams	Ambassador for Regional Health Security	3 March 2020	Incumbent	6 years, 258 days	

=== Ambassador for People Smuggling and Human Trafficking ===
#	Officeholder	Title	Term start date	Term end date	Time in office	Notes
1	John Buckley	Ambassador for People Smuggling Issues	April 2002	30 July 2003	1 year, 3 months	
2	Caroline Millar	Ambassador for People Smuggling Issues	30 July 2003	19 December 2005	2 years, 142 days	
3	Lydia Morton	Ambassador for People Smuggling Issues	19 December 2005	January 2007	1 year	
4	Michael Potts	Ambassador for People Smuggling Issues	January 2007	June 2009	2 years, 5 months	
5	Peter Woolcott	Ambassador for People Smuggling Issues	June 2009	February 2010	8 months	
6	James Larsen	Ambassador for People Smuggling Issues	February 2010	27 May 2012	2 years, 3 months	
7	Craig Chittick	Ambassador for People Smuggling Issues	27 May 2012	December 2014	2 years, 188 days	
8	Andrew Goledzinowski	Ambassador for People Smuggling Issues	December 2014	19 October 2017	2 years, 10 months	
9	Geoffrey Shaw	Ambassador for People Smuggling and Human Trafficking	19 October 2017	22 May 2020	2 years, 216 days	
10	Lucienne Manton	Ambassador for People Smuggling and Human Trafficking	22 May 2020	Incumbent	6 years, 178 days	

=== Ambassadors for Gender Equality ===
#	Officeholder	Title	Term start date	Term end date	Time in office	Notes
1	Penny Williams	Ambassador for Women and Girls	13 September 2011	16 December 2013	2 years, 94 days	
2	Natasha Stott Despoja	Ambassador for Women and Girls	16 December 2013	21 November 2016	2 years, 341 days	
3	Sharman Stone	Ambassador for Women and Girls	21 November 2016	8 March 2020	3 years, 108 days	
4	Julie-Ann Guivarra	Ambassador for Gender Equality	8 March 2020	1 October 2021	1 year, 207 days	
5	Christine Clarke	Ambassador for Women and Girls	31 January 2022	20 December 2022	323 days	
6	Stephanie Copus-Campbell	Ambassador for Gender Equality	20 December 2022	Incumbent	3 years, 331 days	

=== Ambassadors for Human Rights ===
#	Officeholder	Title	Term start date	Term end date	Time in office	Notes
1	Phillip Ruddock	Special Envoy for Human Rights	8 February 2016	October 2017	1 year, 7 months	
Post abolished
2	Bronte Moules	Ambassador for Human Rights	TBD	Incoming		

== Special Envoys ==
=== Parliamentarians ===
==== Special Envoy for the Arts ====
#	Officeholder	Party	Term start date	Term end date	Time in office	Ref
1	Susan Templeman MP	Labor	1 June 2022	Incumbent	4 years, 168 days	

==== Special Envoy for Citizenship and Community Engagement ====
#	Officeholder	Party	Term start date	Term end date	Time in office	Ref
1	Philip Ruddock MP	Liberal	28 May 2015	9 May 2016	347 days	

==== Special Envoy for Cyber Security and Digital Resilience ====
#	Officeholder	Party	Term start date	Term end date	Time in office	Ref
1	Andrew Charlton MP	Labor	29 July 2024	Incumbent	2 years, 110 days	

==== Special Envoy for Defence and Veterans' Affairs ====
#	Officeholder	Party	Title	Term start date	Term end date	Time in office	Ref
1	Luke Gosling MP	Labor	Special Envoy for Defence, Veterans' Affairs and Northern Australia	29 July 2024	Incumbent	2 years, 110 days	

==== Special Envoy for Disaster Recovery ====
#	Officeholder	Party	Term start date	Term end date	Time in office	Ref
1	Senator Tony Sheldon	Labor	24 July 2022	Incumbent	4 years, 115 days	

==== Special Envoy for Drought Assistance and Recovery ====
#	Officeholder	Party	Term start date	Term end date	Time in office	Ref
1	Barnaby Joyce MP	National	11 September 2018	29 May 2019	260 days	

==== Special Envoy for the Great Barrier Reef ====
#	Officeholder	Party	Term start date	Term end date	Time in office	Ref
1	Warren Entsch MP	Liberal National (Note: Entsch sat in the Liberal party room.)	29 May 2019	11 April 2022	2 years, 317 days	
2	Senator Nita Green	Labor	1 June 2022	Incumbent	4 years, 168 days	

==== Special Envoy for Indigenous Affairs ====
#	Officeholder	Party	Title	Term start date	Term end date	Time in office	Ref
1	Tony Abbott MP	Liberal	Special Envoy for Indigenous Affairs	29 August 2018	18 May 2019	262 days	
2	Senator Pat Dodson	Labor	Special Envoy for Reconciliation and Implementation of the Uluru Statement from the Heart	1 June 2022	26 January 2024	1 year, 239 days	

==== Special Envoy for Northern Australia ====
#	Officeholder	Party	Title	Term start date	Term end date	Time in office	Ref
1	Senator Susan McDonald	Liberal National (Note: McDonald sat in the National party room.)	Special Envoy for Northern Australia	27 June 2021	23 May 2022	330 days	
2	Luke Gosling MP	Labor	Special Envoy for Defence, Veterans' Affairs and Northern Australia	29 July 2024	Incumbent	2 years, 110 days	

==== Special Envoy for Social Cohesion ====
#	Officeholder	Party	Term start date	Term end date	Time in office	Ref
1	Peter Khalil MP	Labor	29 July 2024	Incumbent	2 years, 110 days	

==== Special Envoy for Trade ====
#	Officeholder	Party	Term start date	Term end date	Time in office	Ref
1	Andrew Robb MP	Liberal	18 February 2016	9 May 2016	81 days	

=== Others ===
==== Diplomatic ====
===== Special Envoy to Africa =====
#	Officeholder	Term start date	Term end date	Time in office	Ref
1	Malcolm Fraser	1996	1999	2–3 years	
2	Bob McMullan	2010	2012	1–2 years	
3	Joanna Hewitt	2012	2012	Unknown	

===== Special Envoy for the Asia Pacific Community =====
#	Officeholder	Term start date	Term end date	Time in office	Ref
1	Richard Woolcott	2008	Unknown	Unknown	

===== Special Envoy to Bhutan =====
#	Officeholder	Term start date	Term end date	Time in office	Ref
1	Tim Fischer	c. 2011	Unknown	Unknown	

===== Special Envoy to Central Asia =====
#	Officeholder	Term start date	Term end date	Time in office	Ref
1	Peter Tesch	2010	2012	1–2 years	

===== Special Envoy to Eastern Europe, the Balkans and the Caucasus =====
#	Officeholder	Title	Term start date	Term end date	Time in office	Ref
1	Malcolm Fraser	Special Envoy to Yugoslavia	19 April 1999	1999	Unknown	
2	Russell Trood	Special Envoy to Eastern Europe, the Balkans and the Caucasus	31 July 2011	2012	0–1 years	
3	Angus Houston	Special Envoy to Ukraine	21 July 2014	2014	Unknown	

===== Special Envoy to Eritrea, Rwanda and South Sudan =====
#	Officeholder	Term start date	Term end date	Time in office	Ref
1	Tim Fischer	c. 2011	Unknown	Unknown	

===== Special Envoy to Francophone countries and La Francophonie =====
#	Officeholder	Term start date	Term end date	Time in office	Ref
1	Bill Fisher	2010	2013	2–3 years	

===== Special Envoy to Latin America and the Caribbean =====
#	Officeholder	Term start date	Term end date	Time in office	Ref
1	John McCarthy	c. 2011	2012	Unknown	

===== Special Envoy to Lusophone countries =====
#	Officeholder	Term start date	Term end date	Time in office	Ref
1	Neil Mules	c. 2011	2012	Unknown	

===== Special Envoy to the Organisation of Islamic Cooperation =====
#	Officeholder	Term start date	Term end date	Time in office	Ref
1	Ahmed Fahour	29 June 2011	Unknown	Unknown	

===== Special Envoy for the Pacific and Regional Affairs =====
#	Officeholder	Term start date	Term end date	Time in office	Ref
1	Ewen McDonald	3 July 2023	Incumbent	3 years, 136 days	

===== Special Envoy for Southeast Asia =====
#	Officeholder	Term start date	Term end date	Time in office	Ref
1	Nicholas Moore	12 November 2022	Incumbent	4 years, 4 days	

===== Special Envoy to Sri Lanka =====
#	Officeholder	Term start date	Term end date	Time in office	Ref
1	John McCarthy	2 November 2009	Unknown	Unknown	

==== Issues ====
===== Special Envoy to Combat Antisemitism =====
#	Officeholder	Term start date	Term end date	Time in office	Ref
1	Jillian Segal	9 July 2024	Incumbent	2 years, 130 days	

===== Special Envoy to Combat Islamophobia =====
#	Officeholder	Term start date	Term end date	Time in office	Ref
1	Aftab Malik	14 October 2024	Incumbent	2 years, 33 days	

===== Special Envoy for the Kokoda Track =====
#	Officeholder	Term start date	Term end date	Time in office	Ref
1	Sandy Hollway	2008	Unknown	Unknown	

===== Special Envoy for Operation Sovereign Borders =====
#	Officeholder	Term start date	Term end date	Time in office	Ref
1	Jim Molan	27 September 2013	15 August 2014	322 days	

===== Special Envoy on Whale Conservation =====
#	Officeholder	Term start date	Term end date	Time in office	Ref
1	Sandy Hollway	2008	2009	0–1 years	

== See also ==
- Foreign relations of Australia
