= Permanent Representative of Australia to the United Nations Office in Geneva =

- Incumbent; Clare Walsh since 8 July 2025
- Department of Foreign Affairs and Trade
- Style: His/Her Excellency
- Reports to: Minister for Foreign Affairs
- Nominator: Prime Minister of Australia
- Appointer: Governor General of Australia
- Inaugural holder: Bertram Ballard (as Permanent Delegate)
- Formation: 14 December 1949
- Website: Australian Permanent Mission and Consulate-General Geneva, Switzerland

The ambassador and permanent representative of Australia to the United Nations Office in Geneva is an officer of the Australian Department of Foreign Affairs and Trade and the head of the delegation of the Commonwealth of Australia to the United Nations Office in Geneva, Switzerland, and also as permanent representative of Australia to the Conference on Disarmament.

The position has the rank and status of an ambassador extraordinary and plenipotentiary and has been sent since the establishment of the European Office of the United Nations in Geneva on 14 December 1949. The United Nations Office in Geneva includes the headquarters of various international organisations including the World Health Organization, the United Nations Human Rights Council, the United Nations High Commissioner for Refugees and the International Labour Organization. From 1949 to 1973 the role was titled 'Permanent Delegate'. Since 1973, Australia's representation to the General Agreement on Tariffs and Trade, and its successor the World Trade Organization, have been undertaken by a separate ambassador. From 1983 to 1997 there was a separate Permanent Representative to the Conference on Disarmament, but from its establishment in 1979 to 1983 and from 1997 to present it has been held by the present office.

== List of office holders ==
#	Officeholder	Title	Term start date	Term end date	Time in office	Notes
1	Bertram Ballard	Permanent Delegate	14 December 1949	April 1951	1 year, 3 months	
2	Patrick Shaw	Permanent Delegate	April 1951	August 1953	2 years, 4 months	
3	Ralph Harry	Permanent Delegate	August 1953	March 1956	2 years, 7 months	
4	Gordon Jockel	Permanent Delegate	March 1956	February 1959	2 years, 11 months	
5	Lawrence Arnott	Permanent Delegate	February 1959	December 1961	2 years, 10 months	
6	Robert Furlonger	Permanent Delegate	December 1961	July 1964	2 years, 7 months	
7	Brian Hill	Permanent Delegate	July 1964	May 1969	4 years, 10 months	
8	Harold Maxwell Loveday	Permanent Delegate	May 1969	February 1973	3 years, 9 months	
9	Laurence Corkery	Permanent Representative	February 1973	December 1974	1 year, 10 months	
10	Owen Davis	Permanent Representative	December 1974	April 1977	2 years, 4 months	
11	Frederick Blakeney	Permanent Representative	April 1977	July 1978	1 year, 3 months	
12	Lloyd Thomson	Permanent Representative	July 1978	August 1981	3 years, 1 month	
13	David Sadleir	Permanent Representative	August 1981	October 1984	3 years, 2 months	
14	Robert Robertson	Permanent Representative	October 1984	December 1988	4 years, 2 months	
15	Edward Ronald Walker	Permanent Representative	December 1988	January 1993	4 years, 1 month	
16	Penelope Wensley	Permanent Representative	January 1993	July 1995	2 years, 6 months	
17	Howard Bamsey	Permanent Representative	July 1995	October 1996	1 year, 3 months	
18	John Campbell	Permanent Representative	October 1996	March 1999	2 years, 5 months	
19	Les Luck	Permanent Representative	March 1999	April 2002	3 years, 1 month	
20	Michael Smith	Permanent Representative	April 2002	May 2006	4 years, 1 month	
21	Caroline Millar	Permanent Representative	May 2006	February 2010	3 years, 9 months	
22	Peter Woolcott	Permanent Representative	February 2010	September 2014	4 years, 7 months	
23	John Quinn	Permanent Representative	September 2014	29 March 2018	3 years, 6 months	
24	Sally Mansfield	Permanent Representative	29 March 2018	Incumbent	8 years, 162 days	

=== Permanent representatives to the Conference on Disarmament ===
#	Officeholder	Term start date	Term end date	Time in office	Notes
1	Richard Butler	September 1983	January 1989	5 years, 4 months	
2	David Reese	January 1989	December 1990	1 year, 11 months	
3	Paul O'Sullivan	December 1990	March 1994	3 years, 3 months	
4	Richard Starr	March 1994	1997	2–3 years	
Functions assumed by the Permanent Representative of Australia to the United Nations Office in Geneva
