= Peter Woolcott =

Australian public servant and diplomat

Peter Woolcott AO
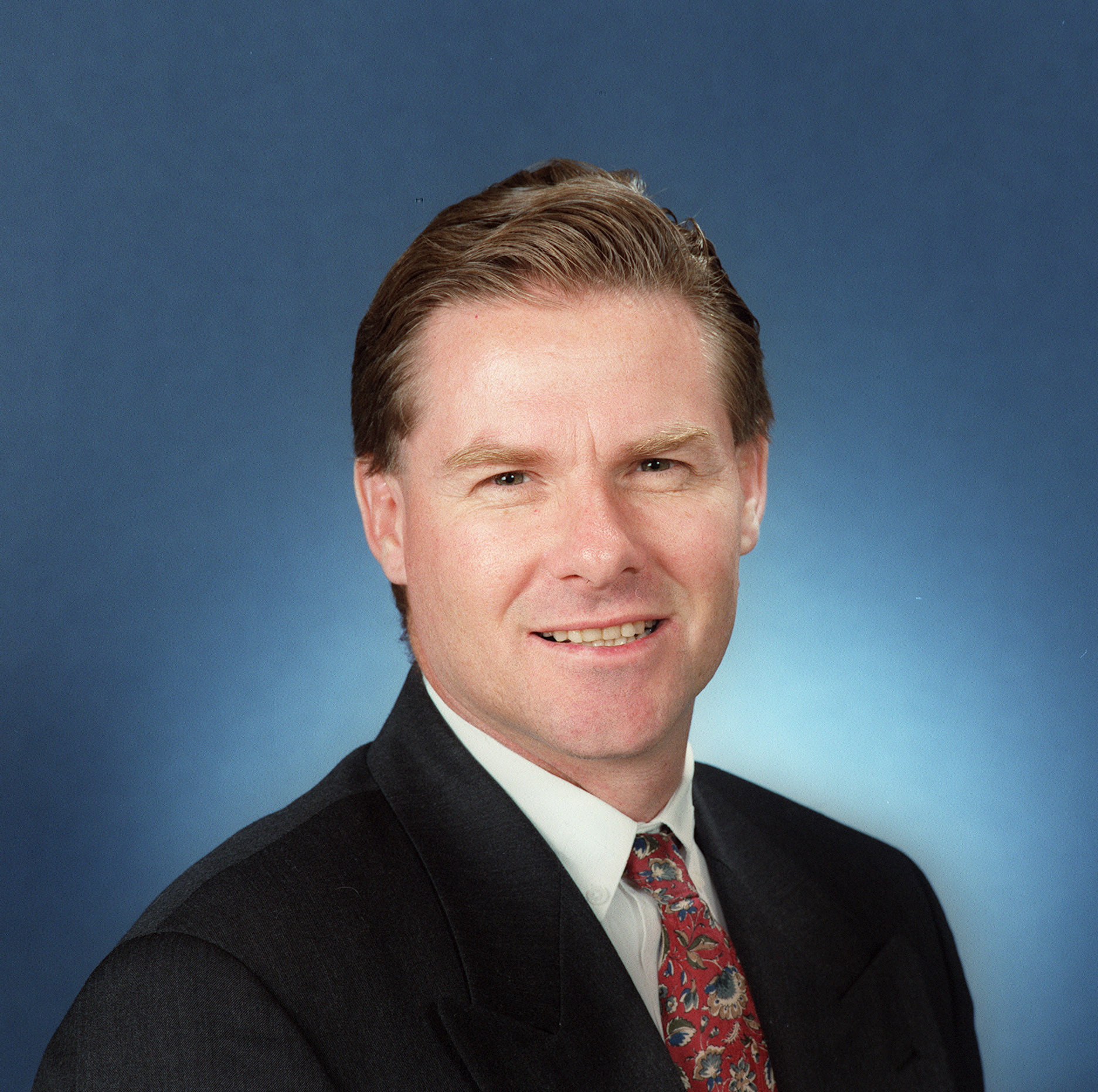
- Portrait of Peter Woolcott

Australian Public Service Commissioner
- In office 9 August 2018 – 10 May 2023
- Preceded by: John Lloyd
- Succeeded by: Gordon de Brouwer

Australia's High Commissioner to New Zealand
- In office 28 January 2016 – 1 August 2017
- Preceded by: Michael Potts
- Succeeded by: Andrew Cumpston (acting)

Personal details
- Born: 19 October 1953 (age 73) West Berlin, West Germany
- Spouse: Tanya Hollows
- Children: Three
- Parent(s): Birgit and Richard Woolcott
- Education: Australian National University; The Fletcher School of Law and Diplomacy
- Occupation: Public servant and diplomat

Peter Richard Woolcott AO (born 19 October 1953) is an Australian public servant, diplomat and the former Australian Public Service Commissioner. He was previously the Chief of Staff to Prime Minister Malcolm Turnbull. Woolcott has served as the Australia's High Commissioner to New Zealand, the Australian Ambassador for the Environment, the Australian Permanent Representative to the United Nations in Geneva, the Australian Ambassador to Italy, the Deputy Head of Mission in Jakarta, and the Consul-General in Honolulu.

== Background and early life ==
Woolcott was born in West Berlin in 1953, the son of Richard Woolcott, a former Australian diplomat public servant. He spent October 1953 to May 1954 in Moscow, while his father was Third Secretary at the Australian Embassy in the city.

Peter Woolcott graduated with a Bachelor of Laws and Bachelor of Arts from the Australian National University and a Master of Arts degree from The Fletcher School of Law and Diplomacy.

== Career ==
After practising as a barrister in Sydney for a number of years, Woolcott joined the Department of Foreign Affairs in 1981. He served in Australian diplomatic missions in Jamaica (1981–83), Argentina (1987–88), the Philippines as deputy head of mission (1994–97), consul-general in Honolulu and representative to United States Pacific Command (1998–2001), deputy head of mission in Jakarta (2001–2002), chief of staff to the minister for foreign affairs (2002–04), and Australian ambassador to Italy (2004–07).

In October 2008, Woolcott was one of several senior officials involved in Australia-US political-military talks. At the talks, Woolcott praised China's diplomatic efforts in south-east Asia, but said there were significant problems in the Philippines, Thailand, Malaysia, Vietnam and Burma.

Woolcott also sat on the Executive Board of the World Food Programme (2004–07). Between 2007 and 2009 he was first assistant secretary of the South East Asia division in the Department of Foreign Affairs and Trade. Woolcott was appointed as the People Smuggling envoy in 2009, leaving the job after just eight months to take up a position as Australia's ambassador to the United Nations in Geneva in 2010. In 2014 he was appointed as Australia's Ambassador for the Environment.

Woolcott was a Director for the Sea Law and Ocean Policy Group (1990–91), the Human Rights Section (1992–94) and the India and Indian Ocean Section. Woolcott has also worked as the international adviser to Bond Corporation (1989–90) and as the Executive Manager International Bid Relations, Sydney Olympic Bid 2000 Bid (1991–92).

In April 2013, under the presidency of Woolcott, the Arms Trade Treaty was adopted by the UN general assembly in New York by an overwhelming majority. This internationally commemorated success will assist in establishing internationally agreed common standards for the national regulation of the conventional arms trade and reducing the flow of unregulated arms. In 2015, Woolcott spearheaded Australia's negotiating teams at climate talks in the United Nations. He emphasized the pertinent issues of climate change: “Left unchecked, it will magnify existing problems and increase pressure on resources including land, water, energy, food and fish stocks. It has the potential to erode development gains, undermine economic growth and compound human security challenges.”

In 2017 Woolcott was appointed an Officer of the Order of Australia for distinguished service to public administration in the field of international relations through senior diplomatic roles, and as a lead negotiator in the non-proliferation and arms control fields.

Diplomatic posts
Preceded by Colin McDonald	Australian Consul-General in Honolulu; 1998–2001	Succeeded by Paul Robilliard
Preceded by Murray Cobban	Australian Ambassador to Italy; 2004–2007	Succeeded by Amanda Vanstone
Preceded by Michael Potts	Australian Ambassador for People Smuggling Issues; 2009–2010	Succeeded by James Larsen
Preceded by Caroline Millar	Permanent Representative of Australia to the United Nations Office in Geneva; 2010–2014	Succeeded by John Quinn
Preceded by Justin Lee as Ambassador for Climate Change	Australian Ambassador for the Environment; 2014–2016	Succeeded by Patrick Suckling
Preceded by Michael Potts	Australian High Commissioner to New Zealand; 2016–2017	Succeeded by Andrew Cumpston (acting)
Preceded by John Lloyd	Australian Public Service Commissioner; 2018–2023	Succeeded by Gordon de Brouwer
