= Penelope Wensley =

Australian public servant and diplomat

The Honourable Penelope Wensley AC
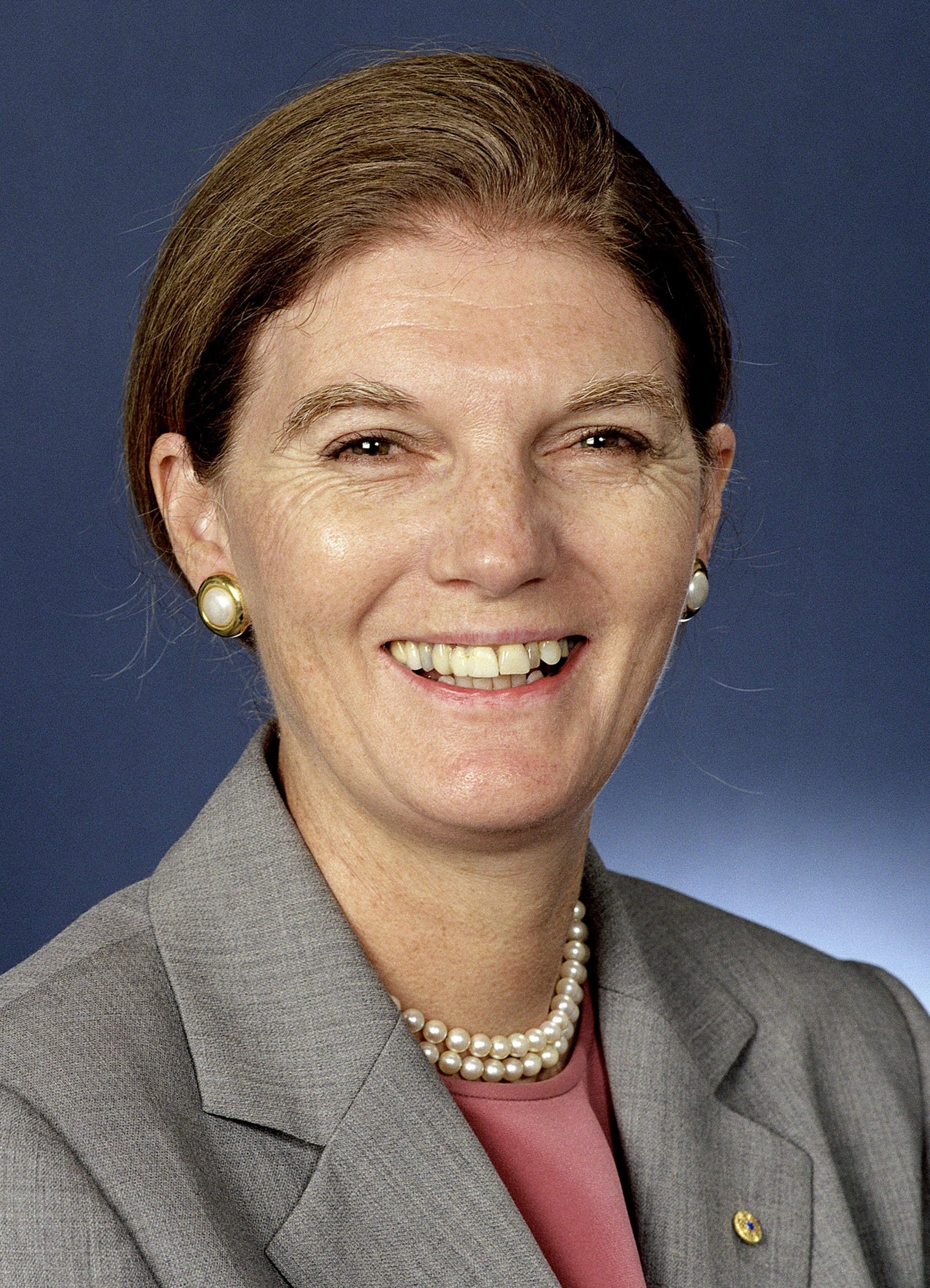

25th Governor of Queensland
- In office 29 July 2008 – 29 July 2014
- Monarch: Elizabeth II
- Premier: Anna Bligh; Campbell Newman
- Preceded by: Quentin Bryce
- Succeeded by: Paul de Jersey

Ambassador of Australia to France
- In office January 2005 – January 2008
- Preceded by: Bill Fisher
- Succeeded by: David Ritchie

High Commissioner of Australia to India
- In office 28 August 2001 – 9 August 2004
- Preceded by: Rob Laurie
- Succeeded by: John McCarthy

Permanent Representative of Australia to the United Nations
- In office 1997–2001
- Preceded by: Richard Butler
- Succeeded by: John Dauth

Personal details
- Born: 18 October 1946 (age 80) Toowoomba, Queensland
- Spouse: Stuart McCosker
- Education: University of Queensland
- Occupation: Diplomat

Penelope Anne Wensley, AC (born 18 October 1946) is an Australian former public servant and diplomat who served as the 25th Governor of Queensland from 2008 to 2014. She was previously High Commissioner to India from 2001 to 2004 and Ambassador to France from 2005 to 2008.

== Early life ==
Penelope Anne Wensley was born in Toowoomba, Queensland, to Neil Wensley and his wife Doris McCulloch. She was educated at Penrith High School in New South Wales, the Rosa Bassett School in London (UK), and the University of Queensland, where she graduated with a first class Honours degree in English and French literature. She was a resident of the Women's College there. Her brothers, Robert Wensley and Bill Wensley, also attended the University of Queensland, as had her parents.

== Diplomatic career ==
Wensley joined the Australian Public Service in 1967, working in the Department of External Affairs in 1967. She was posted to Paris (1969–1972), returned to work in Australia, and was then given a posting in Mexico (1975–1977). During this posting Wensley was threatened with kidnapping. She and her husband, Stuart McCosker, a veterinary surgeon, had a daughter while in Mexico.

Wensley's next diplomatic appointment was in Wellington, New Zealand (1982–1985). She was consul general in Hong Kong from 1986 to 1988. From 1991 to 1992, she was head of the International Organisations Division of the Department of Foreign Affairs and Trade. In 1994, Wensley was awarded an honorary Doctorate of Philosophy by the University of Queensland. She was Ambassador for the Environment from 1992 to 1996. She then became the first woman to be Permanent Representative of Australia to the United Nations in New York between 1997 and 2001.

Wensley was then appointed as the first female Australian High Commissioner to India, a role she held until 2004. When Australia established diplomatic relations with Bhutan in September 2002, Wensley, as High Commissioner in India, was appointed as Australia's first ambassador there from May 2003. From 2005 to 2008, she was Australian Ambassador to France, and non-resident Ambassador to Algeria, Mauritania and Morocco.

== Governor of Queensland ==
On 6 July 2008, the Premier of Queensland, Anna Bligh, announced that Queen Elizabeth II had approved Wensley's appointment as the next Governor of Queensland, in succession to Quentin Bryce, who was relinquishing the office prior to being sworn in as Governor-General of Australia. Wensley was sworn in on 29 July 2008. On 24 January 2013, Wensley's term was extended to July 2014.

== Post-governorship ==
Since 2015, Wensley has served as chair of the Australian Institute of Marine Science Council. She is also chair of the advisory committee for Reef 2050, an advisory body working with the Australian and Queensland governments on a plan to protect and improve the Great Barrier Reef. She also serves on the board of the Lowy Institute. Wensley has been long-term patron of Soil Science Australia and is currently the National Soils Advocate of Australia.

== Honours ==
Wensley was appointed an Officer of the Order of Australia in 2001, a Dame of the Order of St John in 2008, a Grand Officer of the National Order of Merit by the French government in 2009, and was advanced to Companion of the Order of Australia in 2011.

In 2016, the Department of Foreign Affairs and Trade named one of its 16 meeting rooms in honour of Wensley, in recognition of her work as a pioneering female diplomat.

Diplomatic posts
Preceded by Donald Horne as Commissioner	Australian Consul-General in Hong Kong; 1986–1989	Succeeded by Geoff Bentley
Preceded by Sir Ninian Stephen	Australian Ambassador for the Environment; 1992–1996	Succeeded by Howard Bamsey
Preceded by Richard Butler	Permanent Representative of Australia to the United Nations; 1997–2001	Succeeded by John Dauth
Preceded by Rob Laurie	Australian High Commissioner to India; 2001–2004	Succeeded by John McCarthy
Preceded by Bill Fisher	Australian Ambassador to France; 2005–2008	Succeeded by David Ritchie
Government offices
Preceded by Quentin Bryce	Governor of Queensland; 2008–2014	Succeeded by Paul de Jersey
