= WWF-Australia =

Branch of the World Wildlife Fund

World Wildlife Fund – Australia
- Type: NGO
- Industry: Wildlife conservation
- Area served: Australia
- Website: wwf.org.au

WWF-Australia is the Australian national office of the World Wide Fund for Nature (WWF), formerly known as the World Wildlife Fund, an international non-governmental organisation focused on environmental conservation. Established in 1978, WWF-Australia works on biodiversity protection, climate change, and sustainable resource management across Australia and the Oceania region.

== History ==
WWF-Australia was established on 29 June 1978 in Sydney with three staff members and an initial budget of approximately A$80,000, including funding from the Australian Government and corporate donations.

In 1990, WWF-Australia co-founded the Threatened Species Network in partnership with the Australian Government, which operated until 2009. In 1999, the organisation contributed to the development of the Environment Protection and Biodiversity Conservation Act, a key piece of national environmental legislation.

In the early 2000s, WWF-Australia was involved in advocacy efforts to increase protection for major ecosystems, including the Great Barrier Reef and the Ningaloo Reef.

== Activities and programs ==
WWF-Australia conducts conservation programs focused on:

- protecting threatened species
- restoring ecosystems
- addressing climate change impacts
- promoting sustainable agriculture and fisheries

The organisation works in collaboration with givernments, Indigenous communities, businesses, and local stakeholders.

WWF-Australia has supported conservation initiatives such as species recovery programs, habitat restoration, and marine protection efforts. It has also been involved in reintroduction projects for threatened species, including rock wallabies in Western Australia.

== Conservation focus ==
WWF-Australia’s work includes:

- protection of marine ecosystems, including coral reefs
- conservation of terrestrial habitats
- climate mitigation and adaptation initiatives
- biodiversity monitoring and research

The organisation operates projects throughout Australia and contributes to regional conservation efforts in Oceania.

== Funding and structure ==
WWF-Australia is funded primarily through donations from individuals, as well as government grants and partnerships with corporate and institutional donors. The organisation works with range of corporate partners across sectors to support conservation and sustainability initiatives.

Corporate partnerships have included collaborations with companies such as Australia Post, HP, Woolworths Group, and Koala. These partnerships support activities including habitat restoration, sustainable resource management, and environmental awareness initiatives.

== See also ==
- World Wide Fund for Nature
- Environment Protection and Biodiversity Conservation Act 1999
- Great Barrier Reef
