= Justin Lee (diplomat) =

Australian public servant

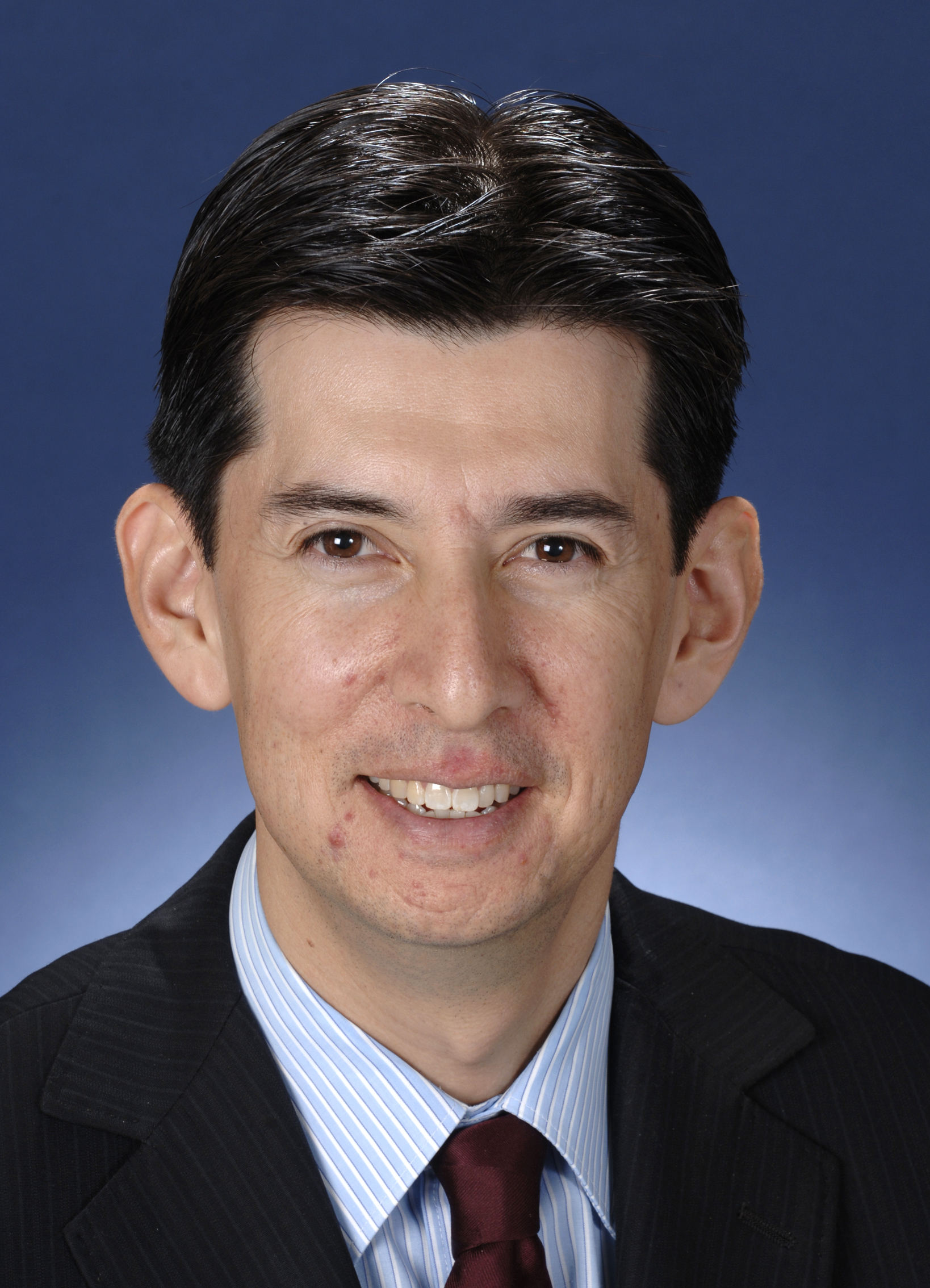
- Justin Lee in 2008
- Born: Justin Lance Lee
- Occupations: Public servant and diplomat

Justin Lance Lee is an Australian public servant, currently serving as First Assistant Secretary under Pacific Melanesia Division at Australia's Department of Foreign Affairs and Trade. Lee was the Australian Ambassador for Climate Change between 2012 and 2014. after having served as Australia's High Commissioner to Bangladesh between 2008 and 2012. Lee served as deputy head of mission to Indonesia from 2015 to 2017, and subsequently served as the High Commissioner to Malaysia from July 2021 to July 2023.

Lee joined the Australian Department of Foreign Affairs and Trade (DFAT) in 1995 and is a career foreign service officer. His positions in DFAT include Assistant Secretary of the Consular Policy Branch and he has previously been posted to Australia's diplomatic missions in Jakarta (2005–08) and Port Moresby (1999–2001).

Lee represented Australia at the 2013 United Nations Climate Change Conference.

Lee holds a BA (Jur.) (Hons) and was awarded a PhD in Development Geography from the University of Adelaide for research on the Sumba Island of Indonesia.

Diplomatic posts
Preceded by Douglas Foskett	Australian High Commissioner to Bangladesh; 2009–2012	Succeeded by Greg Wilcock
Preceded by Louise Hand	Australian Ambassador for Climate Change; 2012–2014	Succeeded by Peter Woolcott as Ambassador for the Environment
Preceded by Andrew Goledzinowski	Australian High Commissioner to Malaysia; 2021 – present	Incumbent
