= Michael Smith (diplomat) =

Diplomat and trade negotiator (1936–2021)

- Born: June 16, 1936; Marblehead, Massachusetts, U.S.
- Died: November 8, 2021 (aged 85); Aldie, Virginia, U.S.
- Occupation(s): Diplomat and trade negotiator

Michael Brackett Smith (June 16, 1936 – November 8, 2021) was an American diplomat and trade negotiator who served as the deputy US Trade Representative in the administrations of presidents Jimmy Carter and Ronald Reagan. In a career spanning three decades, he led the U.S. side in global negotiations on open markets, elimination of trade tariffs, and extension of trade agreements to include intellectual property and services.

== Early life ==
Michael Smith was born on June 16, 1936, in Marblehead, Massachusetts. His mother worked in a travel agency while his father owned a construction company. Growing up in Marblehead, Smith took part in ocean sailing and also participated in bicycle races as far out as in the Scandinavian countries.

He graduated from Harvard University in 1958 with a degree in Scandinavian affairs and international relations. He applied for a job with the U.S. Foreign Service, but was rejected under the rationale that his operations might be impacted by a spleen removal as a child. He later received the job when his mother protested with a letter to the State Department noting that Smith was active in sports at Harvard including playing lacrosse and football.

== Career ==
Smith started his career with the Foreign Service in 1960, when he was deployed to the U.S. Embassy in Tehran. He ran a commissary at the embassy and also installed a Lionel model train that was given to the Shah of Iran's family. He later served at American embassies in Chad, and had other postings that took him to Washington and later to France. Smith was posted in the early 1970s to the White House as an aide to President Richard Nixon, and was responsible for answering letters that were addressed to the president. He would later say that most of the letters were people talking about their taxes and other economic troubles, but, some would also include cookies and other eatables.

Smith was made a part of a team that was negotiating textile-trade agreements in 1973 and in 1975 he was made the chief textile negotiator of the United States, negotiating with states including Hong Kong, Philippines, Malaysia, Thailand, and Japan. He later went on to lead other U.S. trade delegations as deputy Trade Representative in President Jimmy Carter's and President Ronald Reagan's administrations aiming to open markets, eliminate trade tariffs, and extend trade agreements to include intellectual property and services. He served in this role from the mid-1970s through his retirement in 1988. Facing hard negotiations he was described by Susan Schwab, Trade Representative under President George W. Bush, as a "blunt" and "hard-ass" negotiator. His negotiations included textiles, aircraft, automobiles, and semiconductors. One of his negotiating tactics was waving a return flight ticket at the negotiating table implying that he would return at an earlier flight; another was to bring out a bottle of Johnnie Walker Black whiskey to drive late night debates and negotiations. A sign on his office door summarized his bargaining style, "This is not Burger King. You either get it my way, or you don’t get it at all."

Smith retired as a trade representative in 1988 and set up his own international trade consulting firm advising companies trying to access protected foreign markets.

== Personal life ==
Smith married Deborah (née Wince), a fellow White House employee, in 1988. The couple had met in 1986 and went on to have two children. He had been married previously to Nancy Hodgson, a marriage that had ended in a divorce. He had two children from this marriage.

Smith died on November 8, 2021, from pneumonia at a hospital in Aldie, Virginia. He was aged 85.
