= Children's Day (India) =

Day of celebration for children and children related causes in India

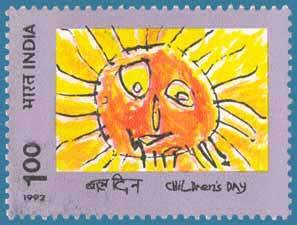
- Indian stamp on Children's Day, based on a child's drawing
- Observed by: India
- Type: National
- Significance: To raise awareness about the rights, education, and welfare of children
- Date: 14 November
- Next time: 14 November 2027
- Frequency: Annual

Children's Day is celebrated in India to raise awareness about the rights, education, and welfare of children. It is celebrated on 14 November every year on the birthday of the first prime minister of India Jawaharlal Nehru, who was known to have been fond of children. On this day, many educational and motivational programs for children are held all over India. Some schools in India make it a holiday to their students on Children's Day while private schools organize a fair for their students.

== History ==
On 5 November 1954, the first Children's Day was observed as "Flower Day" by the predecessor of Indian Council of the Child Welfare (ICCW) to collect funds for United Nations Appeal for Children (UNAC) through the sale of "flower tokens". On 30 July 1949, "Children's Day" was widely celebrated and publicized through radio, articles, cinema, etc.

In 1951, V. M. Kulkarni, a United Nations Social Welfare Fellow, while carrying out a study on the rehabilitation of juvenile delinquents in the UK, realized that there was no system to look after underprivileged children of India. Inspired by the Flag Day observed in England on the birthday of Queen Elizabeth II to raise money for "Save the Child Fund", Kulkarni presented a report recommending that Pandit Nehru's birthday could be marked as Flag Day for collecting funds for NGOs working for child welfare in India. When Nehru's consent was sought, he was at first embarrassed but then conceded reluctantly.

While Nehru's birthday (14 November) had publicly been celebrated all over India and among overseas Indians, since the 1940s, with public meetings being organized to pay tribute to him and games for children being held; it was only in 1954 that the day was first celebrated as "Children's Day". More than 50,000 schoolchildren attended the celebrations in National Stadium in Delhi.

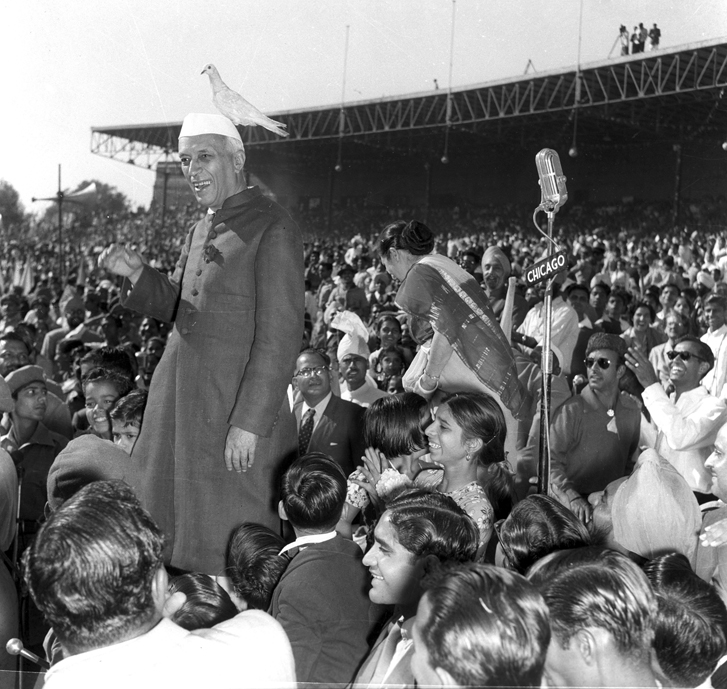
On 14 November 1957, a number of white pigeons were released during the function in the National Stadium. One of the pigeons came back and sat on Nehru's head.

In 1957, 14 November was officially declared Children's Day in India by a special government edict. The Government of India's Department of Posts and Telegraphs issued first day covers and three commemorative stamps on the occasion of Bal Din ("Children's Day").

== Nehru and children ==
Jawaharlal Nehru was affectionately called Chacha Nehru ("Uncle Nehru") by children, and their faith in him was a constant source of happiness for him. As the Prime Minister, Nehru wanted to "create an atmosphere in the country where the attention is constantly focused on children and their welfare". He had also established Children's Film Society India in 1955 so that Indian children could see themselves represented.

Regarding Nehru's concern for children and their welfare, M. O. Mathai wrote in his book My Days With Nehru (1979), "Nehru saw in their innocent faces and sparkling eyes the future of India. He was convinced that no amount of money spent on children and their mothers was too much, and that it was a sound investment for the future." When asked by Ram Narayan Chaudhary in an interview in 1958, if he was fond of children because the future of the country depended on the children, Nehru had replied, "I have always felt that the children of today will make the India of tomorrow, and, the way we bring them up will determine the future of the country."

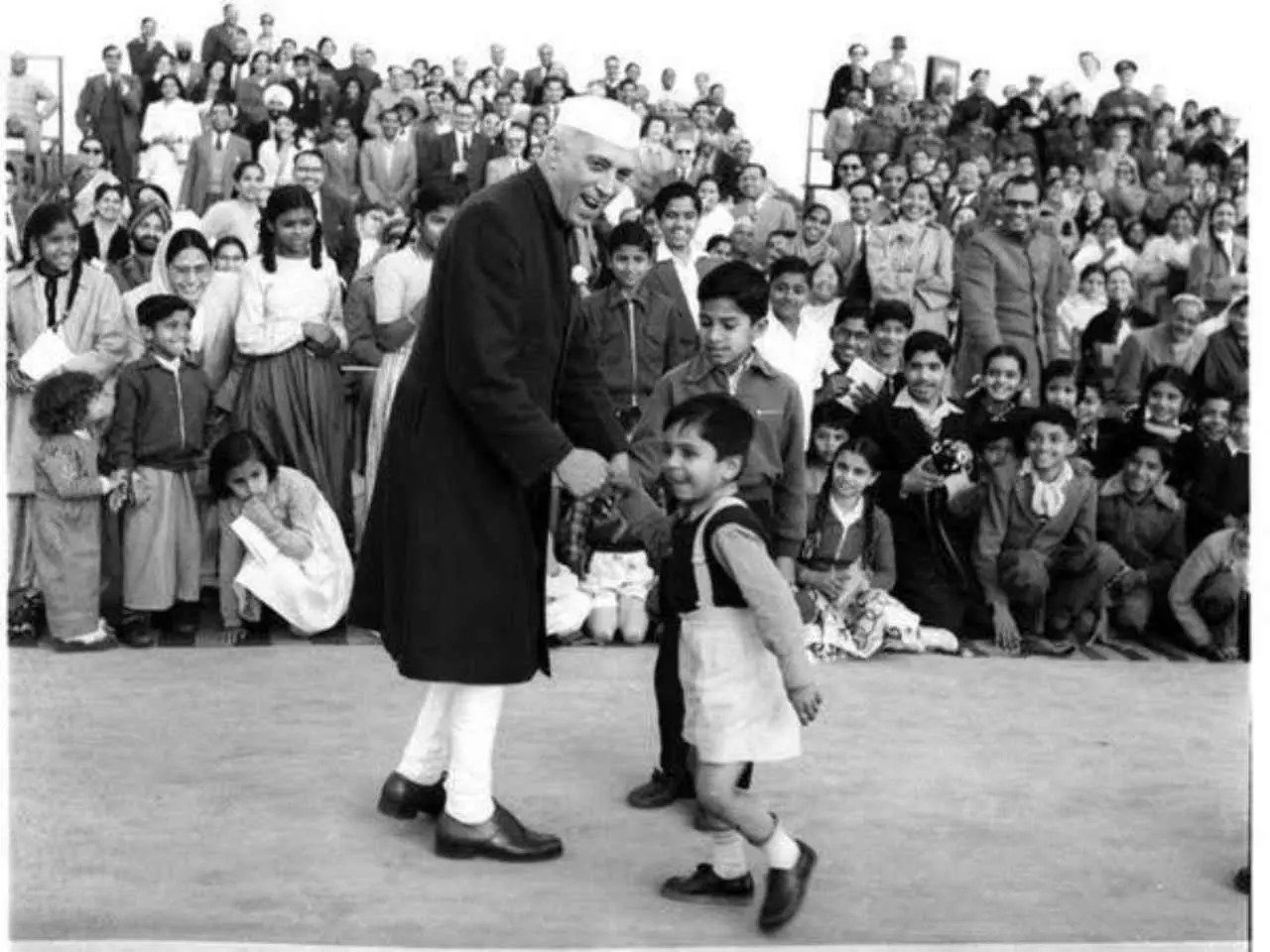
Jawaharlal Nehru shaking hands with one of the children who had come to see the Beating of the Retreat on 29 January 1957.

This philosophy is expressed in the letters written by him to Indira Gandhi, his daughter, when she was a young girl. The letters were also published as books. Letters from a Father to His Daughter (1929) and Glimpses of World History (1934) have gained fame as children's non-fiction because, as Deepa Agarwal writes, "any child can respond to their warm, affectionate tone and his lucid and spontaneous style. The wealth of information woven into them and his unique approach to historical facts is an added bonus... communicating humanist values".

Sir Walter Crocker, however, mentioned in Nehru's biography Nehru: A Contemporary's Estimate (1966) that Nehru did not really have time for or enjoyed the company of children. He wrote, "Nehru certainly did some acting on public occasions and before the TV cameras; but never much. The acting was never worse than the pose of Cha Cha (Uncle) Nehru with the children. This was at its worst on his birthday for a few years when sycophants organized groups of children, with flowers and copious photographing, to parade with him. It was out of character; his interest in children was slender. But his acting was on the periphery of his personality. He did not fake."

== Demand to change date ==
In 2018, sixty MPs of BJP requested the Prime Minister Narendra Modi to designate 26 December as Children's Day. They suggested that 26 December, the day of martyrdom of Chhote Sahibzaade (younger sons of Guru Gobind Singh) be observed as Children's Day, while 14 November be celebrated as "Chacha Diwas" in memory of Nehru.
