= An Autobiography (Nehru) =

Autobiography of Jawaharlal Nehru

- Cover of the 2004 edition
- Author: Jawaharlal Nehru
- Language: English
- Genre: Autobiography
- Publisher: The Bodley Head
- Publication date: 1936
- Publication place: India
- Media type: Print
- Pages: 672
- ISBN: 978-0-19-562361-1
- OCLC: 19285819

An Autobiography, also known as Toward Freedom (1936), is an autobiographical book written by Jawaharlal Nehru while he was in prison between June 1934 and February 1935, and before he became the first Prime Minister of India.

The first edition was published in 1936 by John Lane, The Bodley Head Ltd, London, and has since been through more than 12 editions and translated into more than 30 languages. It has 68 chapters over 672 pages and is published by Penguin Books India.

== Publication ==
Besides the postscript and a few small changes, Nehru wrote the biography between June 1934 and February 1935, and while entirely in prison.

The first edition was published in 1936 and has since been through more than 12 editions and translated into more than 30 languages.

An additional chapter titled 'Five years later', was included in a reprint in 1942 and these early editions were published by John Lane, The Bodley Head Ltd, London. The 2004 edition was published by Penguin Books India, with Sonia Gandhi holding the copyright. She also wrote the foreword to this edition, in which she encourages the reader to combine its content with Nehru's other works, Glimpses of World History and The Discovery of India, in order to understand "the ideas and personalities that have shaped India through the ages".

== Content ==
Nehru clarifies his aims and objectives in the preface to the first edition, as to occupy his time constructively, review past events in India and to begin the job of "self-questioning" in what is his "personal account". He states "my object was...primarily for my own benefit, to trace my own mental growth". He did not target any particular audience but wrote "if I thought of an audience, it was one of my own countrymen and countrywomen. For foreign readers I would have probably written differently". The book includes 68 chapters, with the first titled 'Descent from Kashmir'. Nehru begins with explaining his ancestors migration to Delhi from Kashmir in 1716 and the subsequent settling of his family in Agra after the revolt of 1857.

Chapter four is devoted to "Harrow and Cambridge" and the English influence on Nehru. Written during the long illness of his wife, Kamala, Nehru's autobiography is closely centred around his marriage.

In the book, he describes nationalism as "essentially an anti-feeling, and it feeds and fattens on hatred against other national groups, and especially against the foreign rulers of a subject country". He is self-critical and writes “I have become a queer mixture of the East and the West, out of place everywhere, at home nowhere. Perhaps my thoughts and approach to life are more akin to what is called Western than Eastern, but India clings to me, as she does to all her children, in innumerable ways.” He then writes that “I am a stranger and alien in the West. I cannot be of it. But in my own country also, sometimes I have an exile’s feeling”.

He includes an epilogue on 14 February 1935. On 4 September 1935, five and a half months before the completion of his sentence, he was released from Almora District jail due to his wife's deteriorating health, and the following month he added a postscript whilst at Badenweiler, Schwarzwald, where she was receiving treatment.

== Responses ==
M.G. Hallet, working for the Home department of the Government of India at the time, was appointed to review the book, with a view to judging if the book should be banned. In his review, he reported that Nehru's inclusion of a chapter on animals in prison, was "very human", and he strongly opposed any ban of the book.

According to Walter Crocker, had Nehru not been well known as India's first prime minister, he would have been famous for his autobiography.

== See also ==
- Nehru: A Contemporary's Estimate
