= Malcolm Lyon =

Malcolm Lyon may refer to:

- Dar Lyon (Malcolm Douglas Lyon, 1898–1964), English cricketer
- Malcolm Lyon (diplomat) (1930–2007), Australian public servant and diplomat
