= Peter Heydon =

Australian public servant, policymaker, and diplomat

Sir Peter Heydon CBE

Secretary of the Department of Immigration
- In office 6 November 1961 – 15 May 1971

Personal details
- Born: Peter Richard Heydon; 9 September 1913 Croydon, Sydney
- Died: 15 May 1971 (aged 57) Canberra
- Spouse: Muriel Naomi Slater (m. 1942)
- Education: University of Sydney
- Occupation: Public servant

Sir Peter Richard Heydon CBE (9 September 1913 – 15 May 1971) was an Australian public servant, policymaker, and diplomat. From 1961 to 1971 he was Secretary of the Department of Immigration.

== Life and career ==
Peter Heydon was born in Croydon, Sydney, on 9 September 1913. He was educated at Fort Street Boys' High School, and in 1936 joined the Commonwealth Public Service in the Department of External Affairs, soon after having been admitted to the NSW bar.

In 1942, Heydon married Muriel Naomi Slater, a Canadian who had been his personal assistant during his appointment to the staff of Richard Casey in Washington. In a eulogy after Heydon's death in 1971, Finlay Crisp described the couple's relationship as having "a tempo, a temper and a tone".

From 1943 to 1944, Heydon served with the Australian legation to the Soviet Union which had just opened at the wartime capital of Kuibyshev. Between May and September 1950, Heydon was chargé d'affaires in charge of the Australian Embassy in the Netherlands. He was soon after appointed Minister to Brazil, serving until 1953. Between 1953 and 1955, Heydon was High Commissioner to New Zealand. He was subsequently appointed High Commissioner to India, serving in that position until 1958.

From 1961 until his death in 1971, Heydon was Secretary of the Department of Immigration. He died of a heart attack on 15 May 1971, and was remembered by the prime minister, William McMahon, as one of the best-liked and respected public servants in Canberra. He was survived by his wife, Lady Heydon, and three children – two daughters and a son, John Dyson Heydon, who was later made a judge of the High Court of Australia.

== Awards ==
Heydon was appointed a Commander of the Order of the British Empire in 1959 for service as High Commissioner to India. He was made a Knight Bachelor in June 1970, for his service as Secretary of the Department of Immigration.

Government offices
| Preceded by Tasman Heyes | Secretary of the Department of Immigration; 1961–1971 | Succeeded by Bob Armstrong |
Diplomatic posts
| Preceded by John Quinn as Chargé d'affaires | Australian Ambassador to the Netherlands (as Chargé d'affaires); 1950 | Succeeded by Alfred Stirling as Ambassador |
| Preceded by Torrence Doig as Chargé d'affaires | Australian Minister to Brazil; 1951–1953 | Succeeded by John Ryan as Chargé d'affaires |
| Preceded by Roden Cutler | Australian High Commissioner to New Zealand; 1953–1955 | Succeeded by John Augustine Collins |
| Preceded by Walter Crocker | Australian High Commissioner to India; 1955–1958 | Succeeded by Walter Crocker |
