= Gita Kamath =

Australian Diplomat

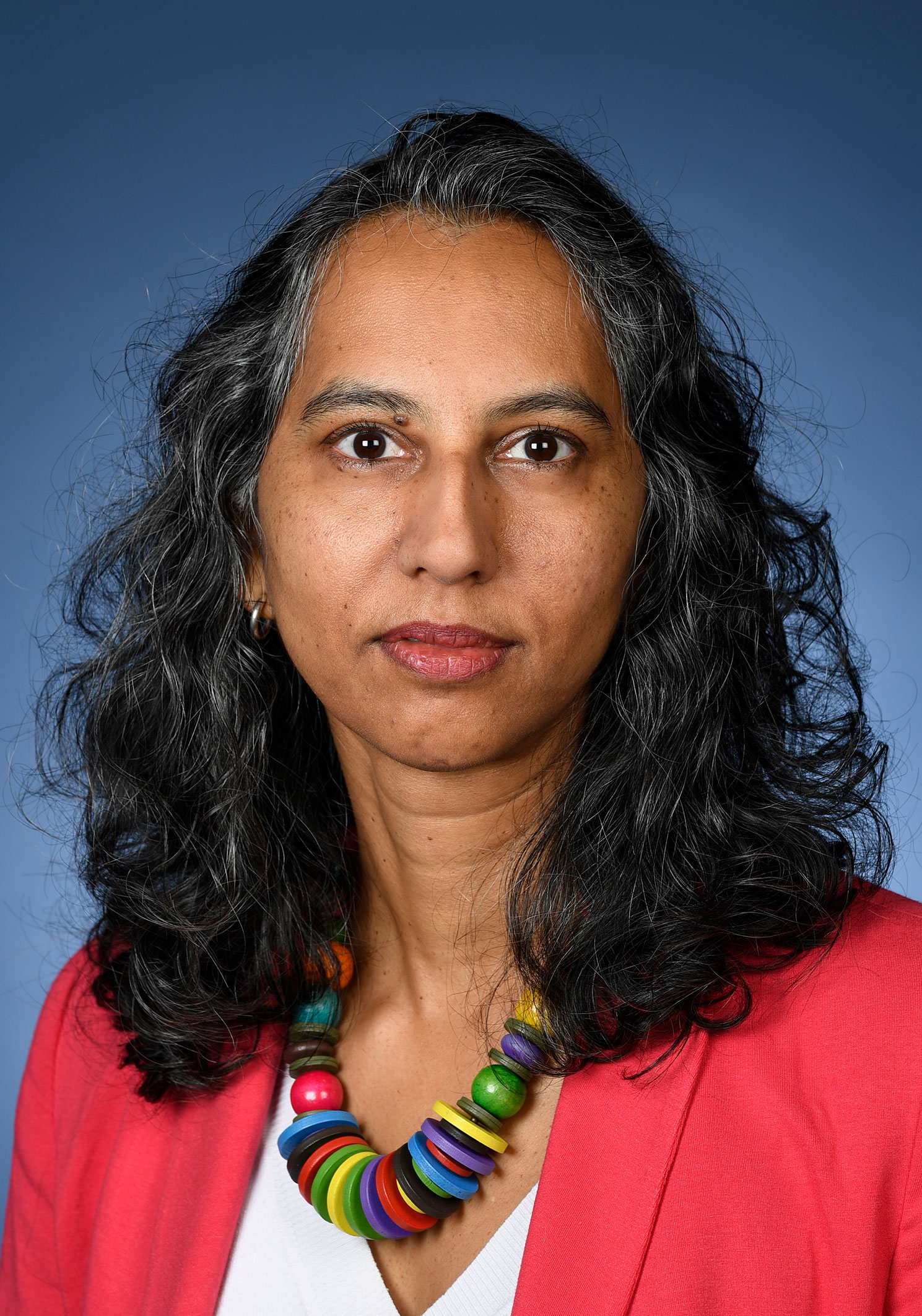
- Kamath, pictured in 2019

High Commissioner of Australia to South Africa
- Incumbent
- Assumed office 2 March 2019
- Preceded by: Adam McCarthy

Personal details
- Education: Australian National University; University of New South Wales; University of Technology Sydney
- Occupation: Diplomat
- Profession: Lawyer

Gita Kamath, an Australian diplomat, is the High Commissioner of Australia to South Africa, since March 2019.

== Background and career ==
Kamath graduated with a Bachelor of Arts and a Bachelor of Laws, University of New South Wales; a Graduate Diploma in Legal Practice, University of Technology Sydney; and a Master of Arts (Foreign Affairs and Trade), from the Australian National University. She commenced her career practicing as a lawyer with Clayton Utz.

Kamath is a senior career officer with the Department of Foreign Affairs and Trade.

Diplomatic posts
Preceded by Adam McCarthy	Australian High Commissioner to South Africa; 2019 – present	Incumbent
