= Bill Pritchett =

Australian public servant

Bill Pritchett AO

Secretary of the Department of Defence
- In office 16 August 1979 – 6 February 1984

Personal details
- Born: William Beal Pritchett; 31 January 1921 Sydney
- Died: 28 January 2014 (aged 92)
- Spouse: Elvira "De" Voorstad
- Children: 2
- Education: University of Sydney (BA)
- Occupation: Public servant

William Beal Pritchett AO (31 January 1921 – 28 January 2014) was a senior Australian public servant. He was Secretary of the Department of Defence between 1979 and 1984.

== Early life and education ==
Bill Pritchett was born on 31 January 1921. He attended the Sydney Church of England Grammar School. Pritchett studied for a Bachelor of Arts degree at Sydney University, studying in history and anthropology.

== Career ==
Pritchett served in World War II and then before joining the Commonwealth Public Service in 1945 as a cadet in the Department of External Affairs. His first overseas post was to Indonesia, during the country's struggle for independence from the Netherlands.

In 1965, Pritchett was appointed Australia High Commissioner to newly independent Singapore. In 1973, Pritchett was recruited to the Defence Department by his former boss in External Affairs, Arthur Tange.

From 1978 to 1979, Pritchett was the Deputy Secretary for Strategy and Intelligence. He was later appointed Secretary of the Defence Department when Tange retired in 1979. During his time as departmental head, Pritchett worked to improve the departmental culture.

Pritchett retired from the public service in 1984.

== Awards and honours ==
In January 1984 Pritchett was made an Officer of the Order of Australia for his public service.

Diplomatic posts
Preceded by Walter Crocker as High Commissioner	Australian High Commissioner to India (Acting); 1962–1963	Succeeded by James Plimsoll as High Commissioner
Preceded by Tom Critchley as High Commissioner to Malaysia	Australian High Commissioner to Singapore; 1965–1967	Succeeded by Alfred Parsons
Government offices
Preceded by Arthur Tange	Secretary of the Department of Defence; 1979–1984	Succeeded by William Cole
