= William Roy Hodgson =

Australian soldier, public servant and diplomat (1892–1958)

Lieutenant Colonel William Hodgson CMG, OBE
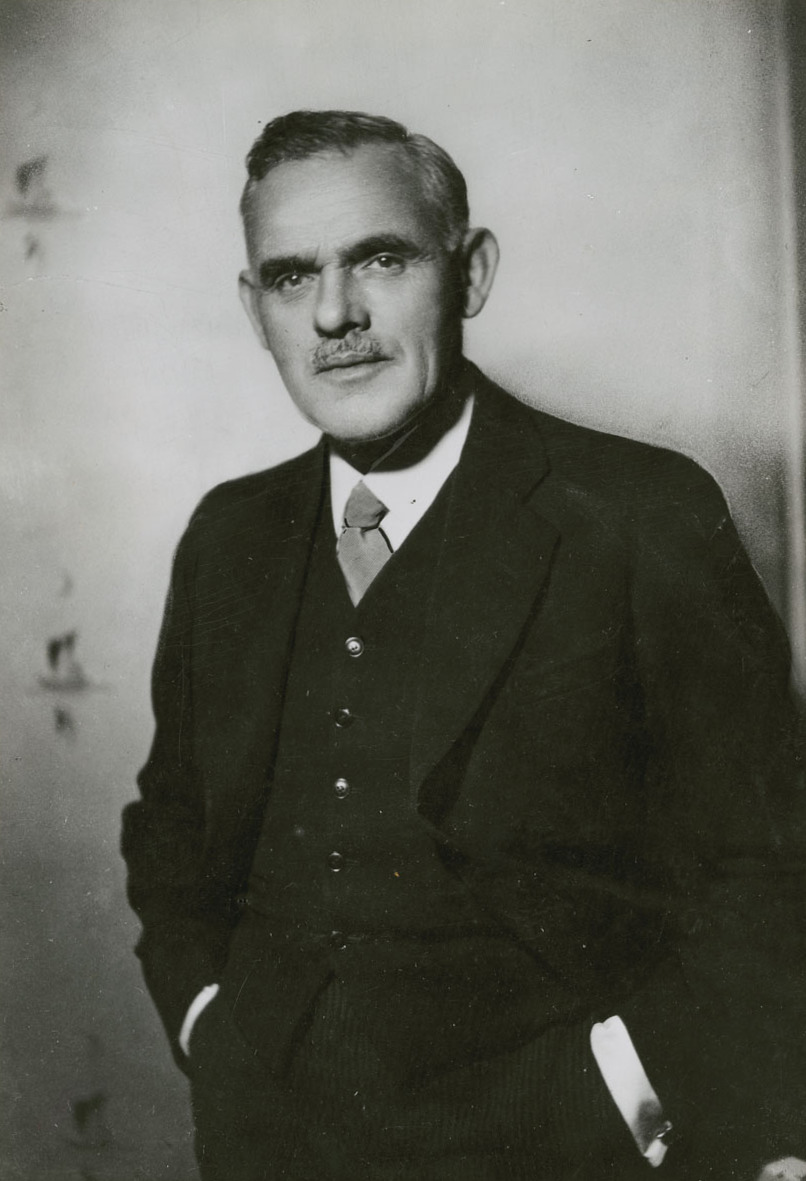
- Hodgson c. 1945

Australian High Commissioner to South Africa
- In office 1952–1957
- Preceded by: John Quinn (acting)
- Succeeded by: Hugh Gilchrist (acting)

Australian Minister to Japan
- In office 1949–1952
- Preceded by: Patrick Shaw
- Succeeded by: Edward Ronald Walker

Australian Ambassador to France
- In office 1945–1949
- Succeeded by: Keith Officer

Secretary of the Department of External Affairs
- In office 19 November 1935 – 21 June 1945
- Preceded by: John Henry Starling
- Succeeded by: William Dunk

Personal details
- Born: 22 May 1892 Kingston, Victoria
- Died: 24 January 1958 (aged 65) Sydney, New South Wales
- Spouse: Muriel Daisy McDowell
- Education: University of Melbourne (LLB); Royal Military College, Duntroon
- Occupation: Army officer, public servant and diplomat
- Civilian awards: Companion of the Order of St Michael and St George
- Nickname: "Hoddy"

Military service
- Allegiance: Australia
- Branch/service: Australian Army
- Years of service: 1911–1934
- Rank: Lieutenant Colonel
- Battles/wars: First World War
- Military awards: Officer of the Order of the British Empire; Mentioned in Despatches; Croix de guerre (France)

Lieutenant Colonel William Roy Hodgson, CMG, OBE (22 May 1892 – 24 January 1958) was an Australian soldier, public servant and diplomat. His significant achievements were being involved in the formation of the United Nations General Assembly and representing Australia internationally at many diplomatic conferences during the Second World War, and being a member of the drafting committee of the UN Universal Declaration of Human Rights.

== Background ==
Born on 22 May 1892 in Kingston, Victoria, William Hodgson was educated at the School of Mines, Ballarat, and, as a member of the original class of 1911, at the Royal Military College, Duntroon, Australian Capital Territory. He graduated in 1914, was appointed to the First Australian Imperial Force and posted to Egypt before fighting in the Gallipoli Campaign. He was wounded by a Turkish sniper and was believed dead. He returned to Australia in 1917 after being awarded the Croix de Guerre avec palme.

He had married Muriel Daisy McDowell on 18 October 1919 at Christ Church, South Yarra, Melbourne. He was attached to the A.M.F. General Staff, Army Headquarters, in Melbourne in 1918 and became head of military intelligence in 1925. He was promoted major on 1 January 1926.

In his spare time Hodgson had acquired accountancy qualifications and studied law at the University of Melbourne, graduating with a Bachelor of Laws in 1929. That year he was seconded for six months to the Development and Migration Commission.

He resigned from defence force service in 1934 and was granted the honorary rank of lieutenant colonel, continuing his involvement with military intelligence until 1936. In 1934 he became assistant secretary supervising that branch of the Prime Minister's Department which dealt with external affairs. In 1935 Hodgson was made Secretary of the Department of External Affairs. As adviser on foreign affairs he attended the 1937 Imperial Conference in London. By the time of his resignation as head of the department in 1945 he had contributed substantially to the development of a professional diplomatic service.

== Diplomacy and United Nations involvement ==
In 1945 Hodgson served as Acting High Commissioner to Canada and was then appointed ambassador to France. In that year he also attended the UN Conference on International Organisation in San Francisco and was leader of the Australian Delegation to the UN Preparatory Commission in London. He was also an Australian delegate to the first General Assembly, held in London in 1945–46, and Australian representative on the Security Council and the Human Rights Commission. He was also an Australian delegate to the Paris Peace Treaties, 1947.

In 1946 the UN established the Commission on human rights (see United Nations Human Rights Committee), and Colonel Hodgson made a significant contribution. Eleanor Roosevelt took on the role of chairing the Commission and took up the task of drafting the Universal Declaration of Human rights, with Hodgson being involved in this committee. He was particularly interested in the enforcement of human rights and pushed for an international tribunal for the filing of complaints. As an alternative, Hodgson proposed that the declaration be legally enforceable, which was not a priority for other members of the committee.

In 1947, Hodgson was appointed head of the Australian Mission to the UN in New York and also represented Australia on the United Nations Atomic Energy Commission. And in 1948 he was a representative on the UN Commission on the Balkans as well as being a representative on the Economic and Social Council and a delegate to the UN General Assembly. He continued to serve on commissions and delegations until his appointment to head the Australian Mission to Japan and as the British Commonwealth Representative on the Allied Council for Japan.

In 1949 he was appointed High Commissioner to South Africa and remained there until 1956, returning to Australia to retire in 1957.

Hodgson was appointed an Officer of the Order of the British Empire in 1934 and a Companion of the Order of St Michael and St George in 1951.

Government offices
Preceded by John Henry Starling	Secretary of the Department of External Affairs; 1935–1945	Succeeded by William Dunk
Diplomatic posts
New title Post established	Australian Minister to France; 1945–1948	Succeeded by Himself as Ambassador to France
Preceded by Himself as Minister to France	Australian Ambassador to France; 1948–1949	Succeeded by Keith Officer
Preceded by Patrick Shaw	Australian Minister to Japan; 1949–1952	Succeeded by Edward Ronald Walker
Preceded by John Quinn (Acting)	Australian High Commissioner to South Africa; 1952–1957	Succeeded by Hugh Gilchrist (Acting)
