= Roy Gollan =

- Born: Herbert Roy Pollock Gollan; 29 August 1892; Gawler, South Australia
- Died: 28 March 1968 (aged 75); Emerald, Victoria, Australia
- Occupations: Public servant, diplomat
- Spouse: Muriel May Hyett (m. 1920)

Herbert Roy Pollock Gollan (29 August 1892 – 28 March 1968) was an Australian public servant and diplomat.

From 1939 to 1948, Gollan was senior Australian Government Trade Commissioner in Bombay (now Mumbai).

He was Australia's High Commissioner to India from 1948 to 1952.

Diplomatic posts
Preceded by Charles Kevin as Charge d'affaires	Australian High Commissioner to India; 1948–1952	Succeeded by Walter Crocker
