= The Discovery of India =

Book by Jawaharlal Nehru

- First edition
- Author: Jawaharlal Nehru
- Language: English, Hindi
- Subject: Indian history, Indian culture, Politics of India, Religion in India, Indian philosophy
- Publisher: John Day (US); Meridian Books (UK)
- Publication date: 14 November 1946; 76 years ago (at Signet Press, Kolkata, India)
- Publication place: India
- Media type: Print (paperback)
- Pages: 595
- ISBN: 978-0-19-562359-8
- LC Class: DS436 .N42 1989

The Discovery of India is a book written by the Indian statesman Jawaharlal Nehru (later India's first Prime Minister) during his imprisonment from 1942 to 1945 at Ahmednagar Fort in the present-day state of Maharashtra by British colonial authorities, prior to India's independence. The book was first published in India in 1946, and it remains a bestseller to this day.

== Synopsis ==
The Discovery of India traces the journey of India from ancient history to the final years of the British Raj. Nehru draws on his knowledge of the Upanishads, Vedas, and textbooks on ancient history to present the development of India, beginning with the Indus Valley Civilization and continuing through socio-political transformations introduced by successive foreign invaders, culminating in the contemporary period of his time.

Imprisoned for his role in the Quit India Movement alongside other Indian leaders, Nehru used this period to document his reflections and understanding of India's past. The book provides a broad overview of Indian history, philosophy, and culture from the perspective of an Indian striving for independence.

== Other contributors ==
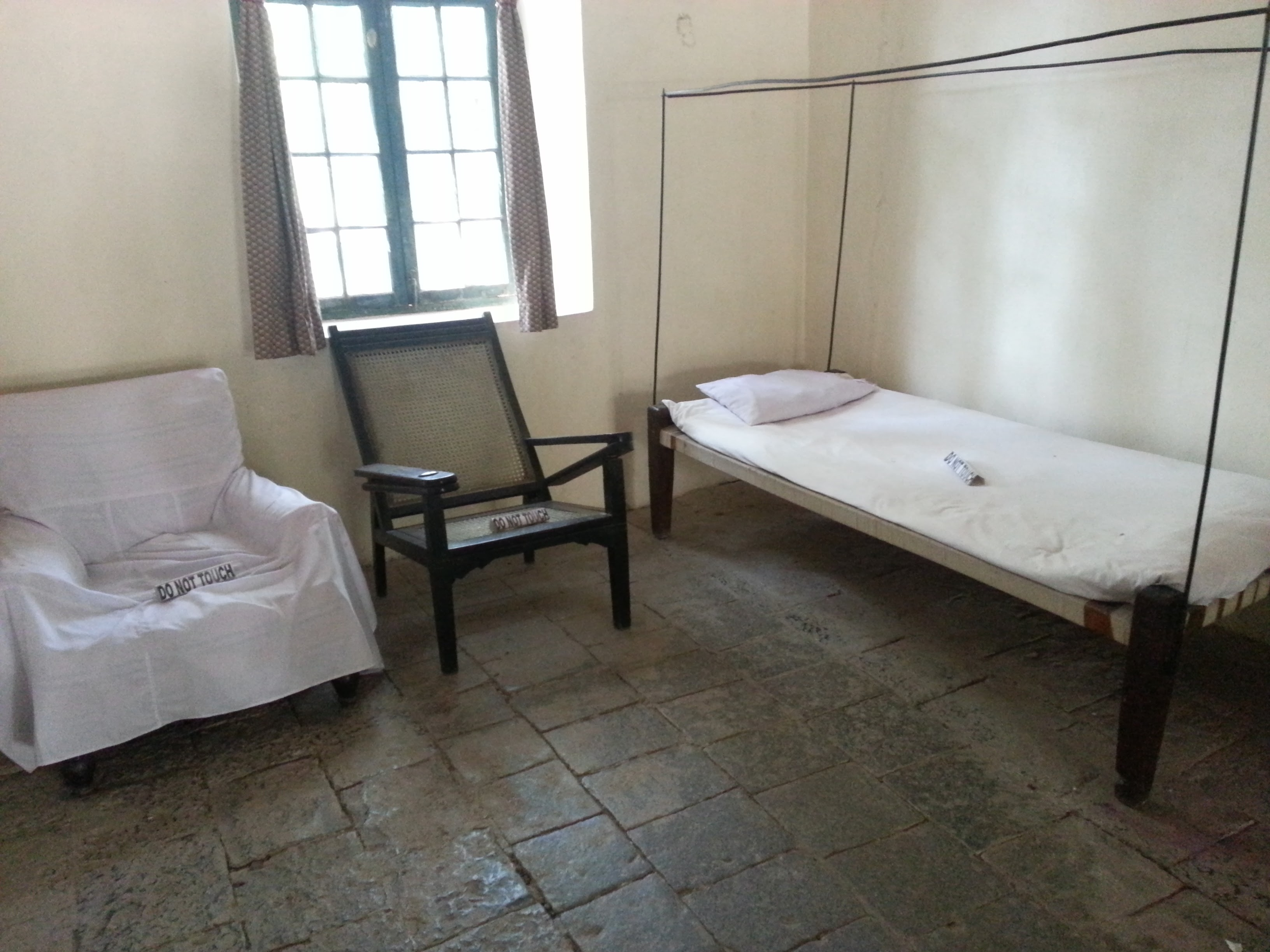
Jawaharlal Nehru's room at Ahmednagar Fort during his incarceration

Nehru acknowledges that some content was influenced by his fellow prisoners at Ahmednagar Fort. He gives special mention to Maulana Abul Kalam Azad, Govind Ballabh Pant, Narendra Deva, and Asaf Ali. All eleven of his fellow prisoners were political detainees from across India with deep knowledge of the subjects discussed in the book. They also assisted in proofreading Nehru's work and offered creative suggestions.

== Edition ==
The book was first published by Signet Press in Calcutta (now Kolkata), India, in March 1946. It is currently published by the Jawaharlal Nehru Memorial Fund, with copyright held by his granddaughter-in-law Sonia Gandhi.

- The Discovery of India by Pandit Jawaharlal Nehru, ISBN 0-670-05801-7
- The Discovery of India by Jawaharlal Nehru (paperback, thirteenth edition), ISBN 0-19-562359-2

== Adaptations ==
The book served as the basis for the 53-episode Indian television series Bharat Ek Khoj (1988), directed by Shyam Benegal and first broadcast on the state-run Doordarshan channel. A modified version of the book is taught as a Hindi supplementary text in the 8th grade in some Indian schools as part of the CBSE NCERT curriculum.

== See also ==
- Letters from a Father to His Daughter (1929)
- An Autobiography (1936)
- Glimpses of World History (1934)
