= Tasman Heyes =

Australian public servant

Sir Tasman Heyes CBE

Secretary of the Department of Immigration
- In office 17 May 1946 – 6 November 1961

Personal details
- Born: Tasman Hudson Eastwood Heyes; 6 November 1896 Kent Town, Adelaide, South Australia
- Died: 25 June 1980 (aged 83) Windsor, Melbourne
- Spouse: Ethel Brettell Causer
- Occupation: Public servant

Sir Tasman Hudson Eastwood "Tas" Heyes CBE (6 November 1896 – 25 June 1980) was a senior Australian public servant and policymaker. He was Secretary of the Department of Immigration between May 1946 and November 1961.

== Life and career ==
Tasman Heyes joined the Commonwealth Public Service in 1912 as a messenger in the Department of Defence.

In 1941, he was acting director of the Australian War Memorial, and oversaw the opening of the institution.

Between 1946 and 1961, Heyes was Secretary of the Department of Immigration under minister Arthur Calwell. He defended the White Australia policy, preferring British and Northern European immigrants, and people of "Aryan" stock.

Heyes died on 25 June 1980 and was cremated.

== Awards ==
Heyes was made a Commander of the Order of the British Empire in June 1953. He was appointed a Knight Bachelor in January 1960 for service as Secretary of the Department of Immigration.

In 1962, Heyes was awarded the Nansen Refugee Award by the UN Refugee Agency, for his work as head of the Department of Immigration.

Government offices
New title Department established	Secretary of the Department of Immigration; 1946–1961	Succeeded by Peter Heydon
