= Graeme Wilson (diplomat) =

Australian rules footballer

Personal information
- Full name: Graeme Wilson
- Born: 15 December 1953
- Died: 2 September 2014 (aged 60); Pretoria, South Africa
- Original team: University Blues
- Height: 184 cm (6 ft 0 in)
- Weight: 75 kg (165 lb)

Playing career^{1}
Years	Club	Games (Goals)
1974–76	South Melbourne	14 (14)
- ^{1} Playing statistics correct to the end of 1976.

Graeme Wilson (15 December 1953 – 2 September 2014) was an Australian diplomat and public servant. He served in the Department of Foreign Affairs and Trade in Canberra, Central America, the Solomon Islands, Nouméa, Paris and Vanuatu. At the time of his death he was Australia's High Commissioner to South Africa.

He was also an Australian rules footballer who played with South Melbourne in the Victorian Football League (VFL).

When working in France, he used to play cricket for the Paris University Club.
