= John Quinn (diplomat) =

Australian public servant and diplomat

John Quinn OBE
- Born: John Paul Quinn; 26 February 1919; Paddington, New South Wales
- Died: 12 September 1961 (aged 42); Rabat district, Morocco
- Occupations: Public servant, diplomat
- Spouse: Josephine Margaret Paton (m. 1949–1961)

John Paul Quinn OBE (26 February 1919 – 12 September 1961) was an Australian public servant and diplomat.

His early career included stints serving in Singapore, The Hague, London and in South Africa, where he served as Acting High Commissioner for a time between 1951 and 1952. Quinn was named Australia's first Minister to the associated States of Indo-China in 1952.

In April 1961, Quinn was appointed Australia's first Ambassador to the United Arab Republic.

On 12 September 1961, Quinn died while in office as Australian Minister to Cairo, he had been a passenger on Air France Flight 2005 when it crashed.

Diplomatic posts
Preceded by Keith Officer as Minister	Australian Chargé d'Affaires at the Netherlands; 1948–1950	Succeeded by Peter Heydon as Chargé d'Affaires
Preceded by Alfred Stirling	Australian High Commissioner to South Africa (Acting); 1951–1952	Succeeded by William Roy Hodgson
Preceded by John Rowland as Charge d'Affaires	Australian Minister to Vietnam; 1952–1954	Succeeded by David McNicol
Vacant Title last held by Roden Cutler as Minister	Australian Minister to Egypt; 1960–1961	Succeeded by Himself as Ambassador
Preceded by Himself as Minister	Australian Ambassador to the United Arab Republic; 1961	Succeeded by Francis Hamilton Stuart
