= Hugh McClure Smith =

Australian public servant and diplomat

- Born: Hugh Alexander McClure Smith; 14 April 1902; Melbourne, Victoria, Australia
- Died: 8 October 1961 (aged 59); Florence, Tuscany, Italy
- Education: University of Geneva
- Occupations: Public servant, diplomat
- Spouse: Margaret Vincent Buddy

Hugh Alexander McClure Smith (14 April 1902 – 8 October 1961) was an Australian public servant and diplomat.

McClure Smith died in October 1961 whilst on posting in Rome, Italy.

Diplomatic posts
Preceded by Claude Massey	Australian Minister to Egypt; 1953–1955	Succeeded by Roden Cutler
Preceded by Alfred Stirling	Australian Ambassador to the Netherlands; 1955–1958	Succeeded by Edwin McCarthy
Preceded by Paul McGuire	Australian Ambassador to Italy; 1958–1961	Succeeded by Alfred Stirling
