= List of ambassadors of Australia to the Netherlands =

Ambassador of Australia to the Netherlands

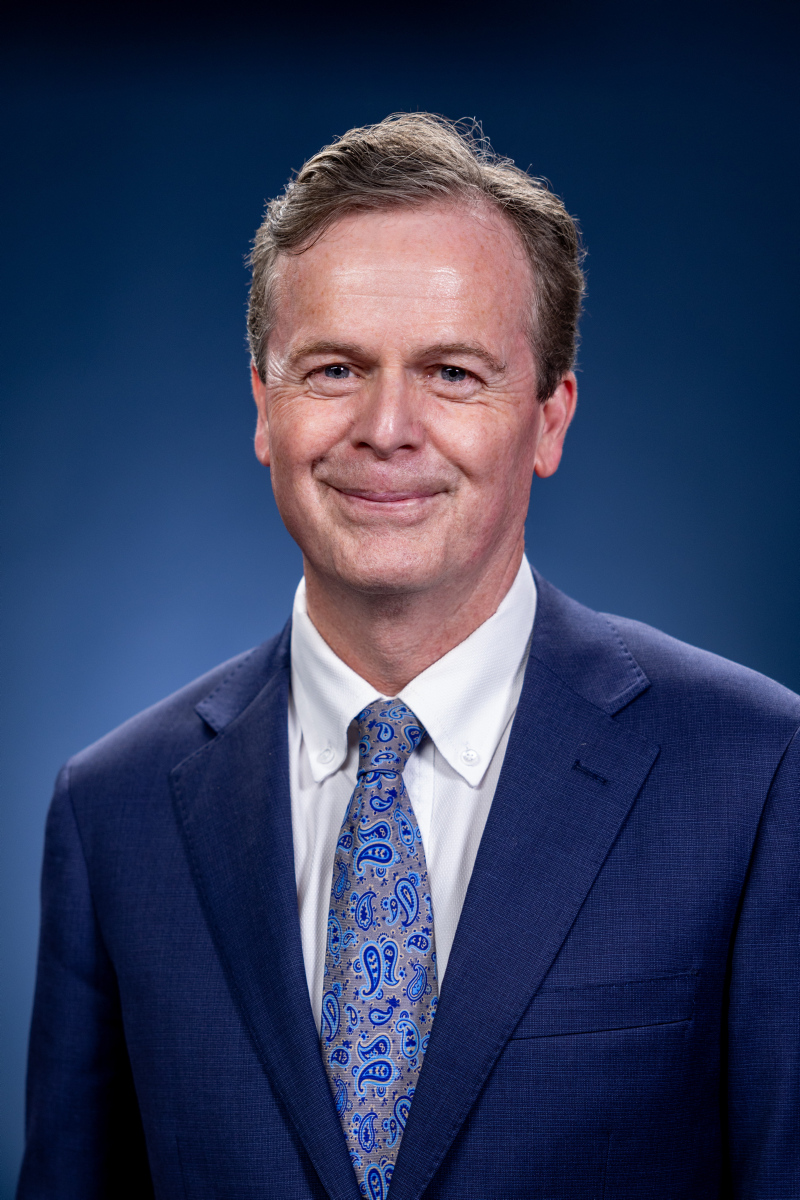
- Incumbent; Greg French since April 2023
- Department of Foreign Affairs and Trade
- Style: His Excellency
- Reports to: Minister for Foreign Affairs
- Residence: The Hague
- Nominator: Prime Minister of Australia
- Appointer: Governor General of Australia
- Inaugural holder: Stanley Bruce (as Minister)
- Formation: 1942

The ambassador of Australia to the Netherlands is an officer of the Australian Department of Foreign Affairs and Trade and the head of the Embassy of the Commonwealth of Australia to the Kingdom of the Netherlands. The ambassador resides in The Hague. The current ambassador, since April 2023, is Greg French.

== List of heads of mission ==
Ordinal	Officeholder	Title	Term start date	Term end date	Time in office	Notes
1	Stanley Bruce CH	Minister to the Netherlands^{[note a]}	1942	1945	2–3 years	
(n/a)	John Hood	Chargé d'affaires	1945	1946	0–1 years	
2	Keith Officer OBE, MC	Minister to the Netherlands	1946	1948	1–2 years	
(n/a)	John Quinn	Chargé d'affaires	1948	1950	1–2 years	
(n/a)	Peter Heydon	Chargé d'affaires	1950	1950	0 years	
3	Alfred Stirling CBE	Ambassador of Australia to the Netherlands	1950	1955	4–5 years	
4	Hugh McClure Smith	Ambassador of Australia to the Netherlands	1955	1958	2–3 years	
5	Sir Edwin McCarthy CBE	Ambassador of Australia to the Netherlands	1958	1962	3–4 years	
6	Walter Crocker CBE	Ambassador of Australia to the Netherlands	1962	1965	2–3 years	
7	Sir Roden Cutler VC, KCMG, CBE	Ambassador of Australia to the Netherlands	1965	1966	0–1 years	
8	Colin Moodie	Ambassador of Australia to the Netherlands	1966	1970	3–4 years	
9	Lloyd Thomson	Ambassador of Australia to the Netherlands	1970	1974	3–4 years	
10	Frederick Blakeney CBE	Ambassador of Australia to the Netherlands	1974	1977	2–3 years	
11	David Fairbairn KBE, DFC	Ambassador of Australia to the Netherlands	1977	1980	2–3 years	
12	James Cumes	Ambassador of Australia to the Netherlands	1980	1984	3–4 years	
13	Geoffrey Price	Ambassador of Australia to the Netherlands	1984	1987	2–3 years	
14	Don Grimes	Ambassador of Australia to the Netherlands	1987	1991	3–4 years	
15	Warwick Weemaes	Ambassador of Australia to the Netherlands	1991	1993	1–2 years	
16	Michael Tate^{[note b]}	Ambassador of Australia to the Netherlands	1993	1996	2–3 years	
17	Ted Delofski	Ambassador of Australia to the Netherlands	1997	2001	3–4 years	
18	Peter Hussin	Ambassador of Australia to the Netherlands	2001	2004	2–3 years	
19	Stephen Brady	Ambassador of Australia to the Netherlands	2004	2008	3–4 years	
20	Lydia Morton	Ambassador of Australia to the Netherlands	2008	2011	2–3 year	
21	Neil Mules	Ambassador of Australia to the Netherlands	2011	2015	3–4 years	
22	Brett Mason	Ambassador of Australia to the Netherlands	21 April 2015	August 2018	3 years, 3 months	
23	Matthew Neuhaus	Ambassador of Australia to the Netherlands	August 2018	April 2023	4 years, 8 months	
24	Dr Greg French	Ambassador of Australia to the Netherlands	April 2023	incumbent	3 years, 5 months	

^[note a]: Non-resident minister; served concurrently as Australian High Commissioner to the United Kingdom.
^[note b]: Tate served concurrently as the Australian ambassador to the Holy See.
