= Keith Officer =

Australian public servant and diplomat

Sir Keith Officer OBE, MC
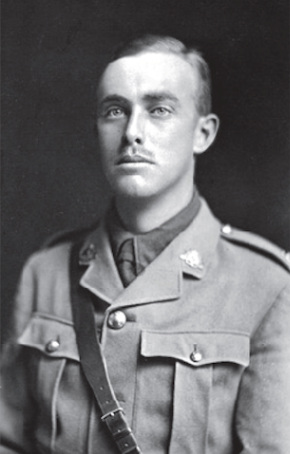

Australian Ambassador to France
- In office 18 April 1950 – March 1955
- Preceded by: William Hodgson
- Succeeded by: Alfred Stirling

Australian Ambassador to China
- In office 15 November 1948 – 17 October 1949
- Preceded by: Douglas Copland
- Succeeded by: Vacant

Australian Minister to the Netherlands
- In office 1946–1948
- Preceded by: John Hood
- Succeeded by: John Quinn

Personal details
- Born: 2 October 1889 Toorak, Victoria, Australia
- Died: 21 June 1969 (aged 79) Southampton, England
- Education: University of Melbourne (LLB)
- Occupation: Public servant and diplomat
- Civilian awards: Knight Bachelor

Military service
- Allegiance: Australia
- Branch/service: Australian Imperial Force
- Years of service: 1914–1919
- Rank: Major
- Battles/wars: First World War
- Military awards: Officer of the Order of the British Empire; Military Cross; Mentioned in Despatches (3)

Sir Frank Keith Officer, OBE, MC (2 October 1889 – 21 June 1969) was an Australian public servant and diplomat, best known for his postings in ambassadorial positions around the world.

== Life and career ==
Keith Officer was born on 2 October 1889 in Toorak, Melbourne. He was educated at Melbourne Grammar School and Melbourne University where he was resident at Ormond College.

Between 1914 and 1918, Officer served with the First Australian Imperial Force in Egypt, Gallipoli, France and Belgium.

From 1919 to 1923, Officer was a political officer of the British Colonial Service in Nigeria.

He joined the Australian Department of External Affairs in 1927.

In 1940, Officer was appointed counsellor to the Australian legation in Japan, second in command to Sir John Latham. He was Charge d'Affaires in Tokyo when the Pacific War broke out.

Between 1946 and 1948, Officer was Australian Minister to the Netherlands. Officer was offered the post of Australian Minister to Moscow in 1947.

In 1948, Officer was appointed Australian Ambassador to the Republic of China. He was recalled from Nanjing in November 1949 to consult with the Department of External Affairs on the recognition by the United Kingdom of the Communist Government in China.

Between 1950 and 1955 Officer was Australian Ambassador to France. He retired from the Commonwealth Public Service at the end of March 1950. His retirement prompted External Affairs Minister Richard Casey to write a letter touching on Officer's work, in which he said: "you can properly regard yourself not only as one of the founders of the Australian Foreign Service but as a model which men of succeeding generations can seek to emulate."

== Awards ==
In 1917, Officer was awarded the Military Cross. He was appointed an Officer of the Order of the British Empire in 1919. In the 1950 Birthday Honours he was made a Knight Bachelor, for services as ambassador in Paris.

Diplomatic posts
| Preceded by John Hood as Chargé d'affaires | Australian Minister to the Netherlands; 1946–1948 | Succeeded by John Quinn as Chargé d'affaires |
| Preceded by Douglas Copland as Minister to China | Australian Ambassador to China; 1948–1949 | Vacant Proclamation of the People's Republic of China Title next held by Stephen FitzGerald |
| Preceded by William Hodgson | Australian Ambassador to France; 1950–1955 | Succeeded by Alfred Stirling |
