= List of high commissioners of Australia to India =

Diplomats of Australia to India

High Commissioner of Australia to India

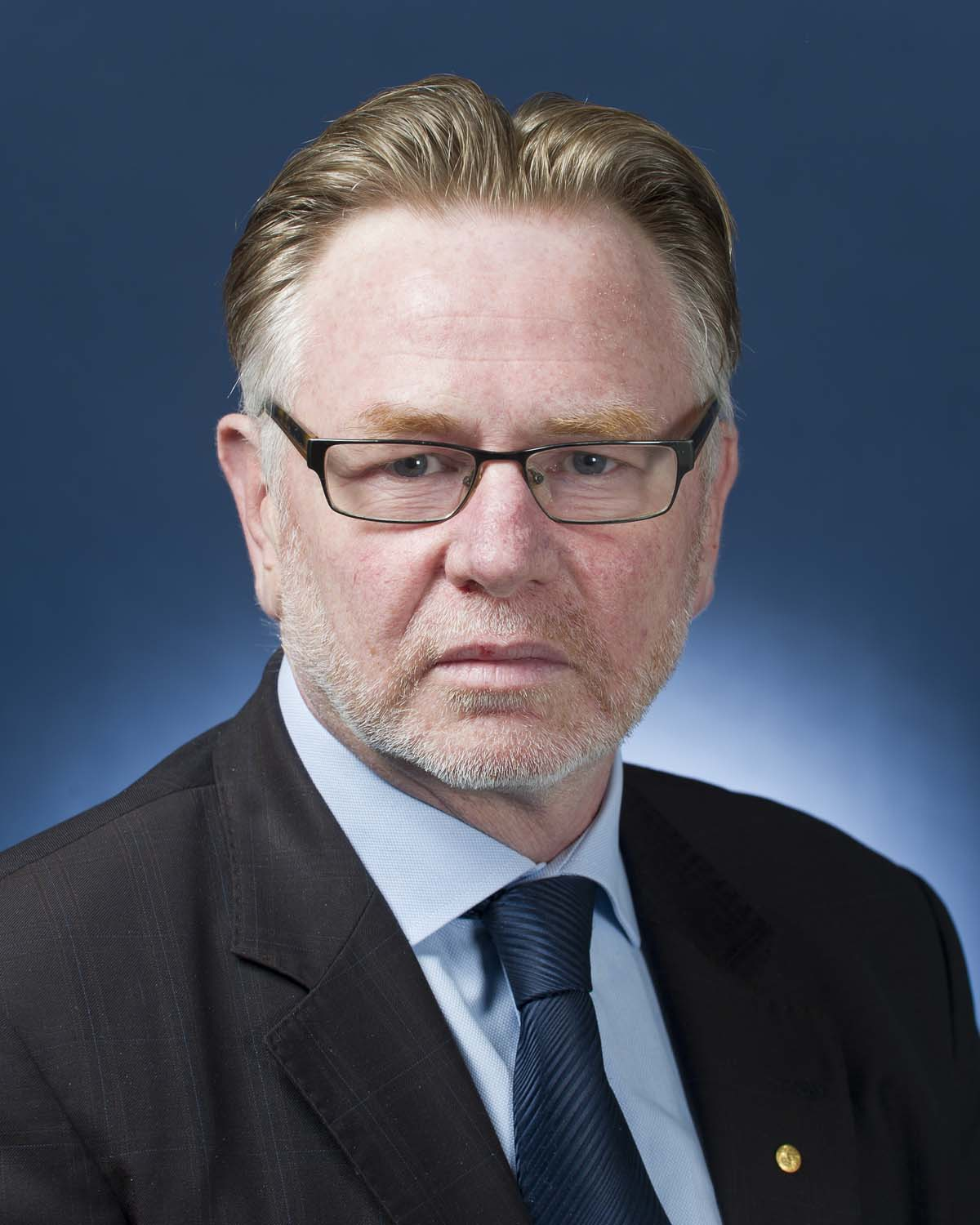
- Incumbent; Philip Green since 1 July 2023
- Department of Foreign Affairs and Trade
- Style: His Excellency
- Reports to: Minister for Foreign Affairs
- Seat: New Delhi
- Nominator: Prime Minister of Australia
- Appointer: Governor General of Australia
- Inaugural holder: Iven Mackay
- Formation: 2 November 1943
- Website: Australian High Commission, New Delhi – India, Bhutan

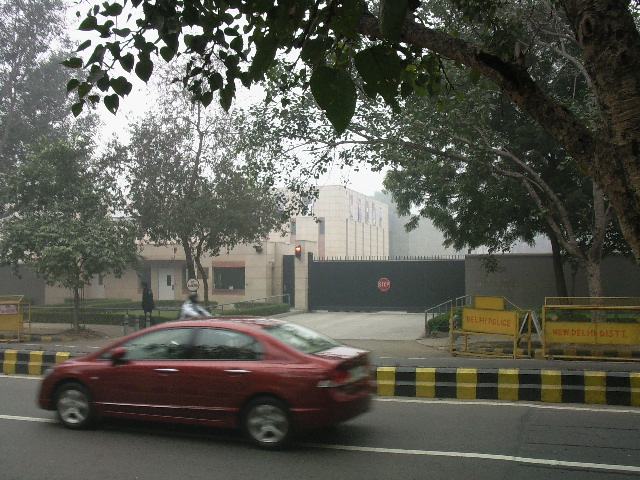
The Australian High Commission in New Delhi

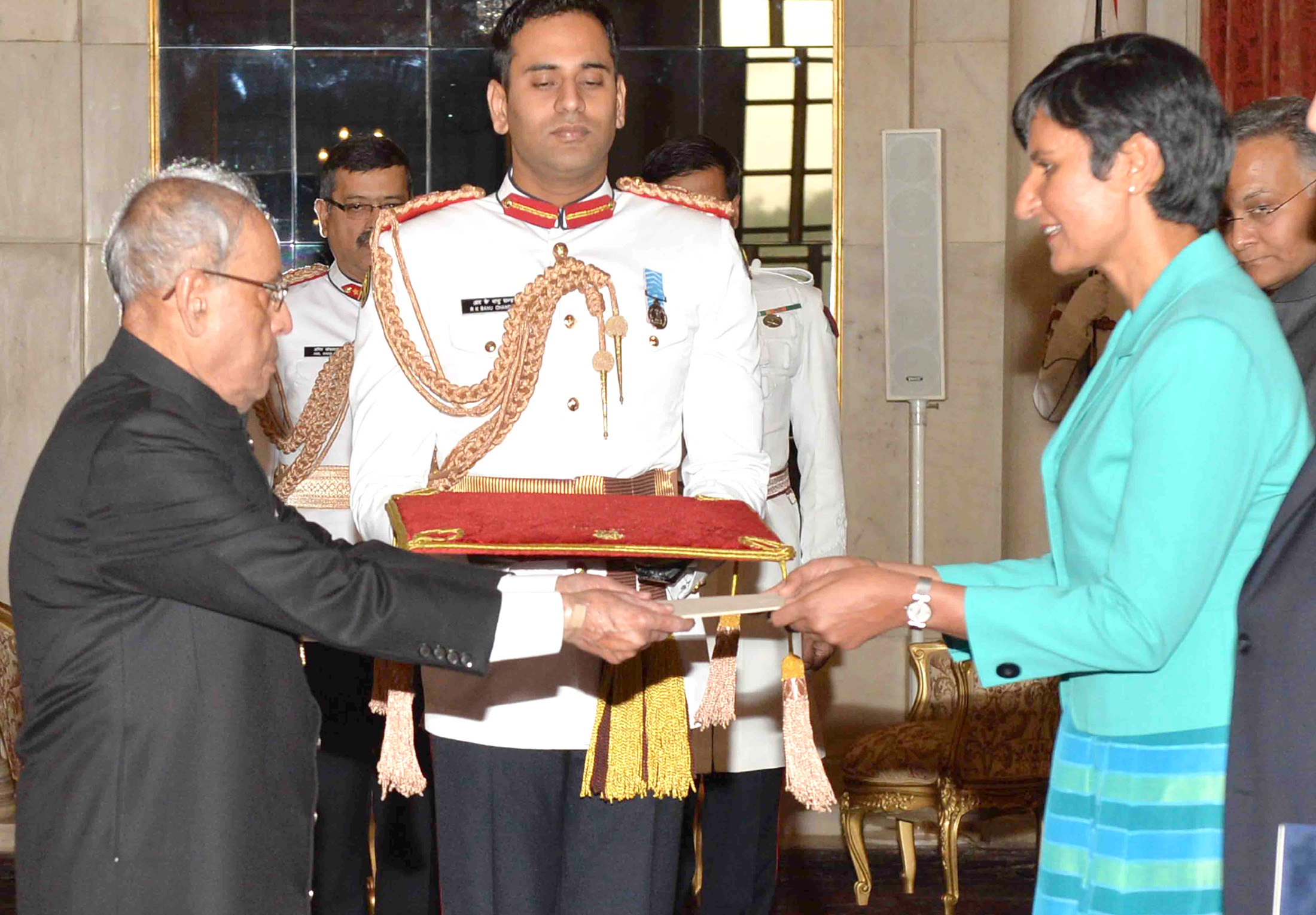
High Commissioner Harinder Sidhu presenting her commission to the President of India, Pranab Mukherjee, on 4 April 2016.

The high commissioner of Australia to India is an officer of the Australian Department of Foreign Affairs and Trade and the head of the High Commission of the Commonwealth of Australia to India in New Delhi. The position has the rank and status of an ambassador extraordinary and plenipotentiary and is currently held by Philip Green, since 1 July 2023. The high commissioner also holds non-resident accreditation as Ambassador to Bhutan since diplomatic relations were established on 14 September 2002.

== History ==
In December 1939, the federal government appointed Roy Gollan as its first official trade representative in India, based in Calcutta. An assistant trade commissioner was later appointed in New Delhi, while Australian interests were also represented on the Eastern Group Supply Council during World War II, establishing "a firm Australian presence in India in the 1940s".

The Australian Government has offered diplomatic representation in India since 1943. Between 1960 and 1986, the high commissioner also had non-resident accreditation as Ambassador to Nepal. A resident Australian Embassy in Nepal was opened on 27 April 1984, but the first resident ambassador was not appointed until 4 May 1986. The high commission's work is assisted by multiple consulates throughout the country that have visiting and reporting responsibilities, as well as handling consular and trade matters for the high commission.

On 21 May 2020, High Commissioner Barry O'Farrell presented his commission to the President of India, Ram Nath Kovind, in India's first-ever virtual credentials ceremony. On 7 October 2022, O'Farrell presented his credentials as ambassador to the King of Bhutan, Jigme Khesar Namgyel Wangchuck, at Tashichho Dzong in Thimphu.

== List of high commissioners ==
#	Officeholder	Other offices	Term start date	Term end date	Time in office	Notes
1	Iven Mackay	n/a	2 November 1943	29 May 1948	4 years, 209 days	
−	Charles Kevin (Acting)	n/a	29 May 1948	15 January 1949	231 days	
2	Roy Gollan	n/a	15 January 1949	March 1952	3 years, 1 month	
3	Walter Crocker	n/a	March 1952	19 March 1955	3 years	
−	D. J. Munro (Acting)	n/a	19 March 1955	22 April 1955	34 days	
4	Peter Heydon	n/a	22 April 1955	13 November 1958	3 years, 205 days	
5	Walter Crocker	^{A}	13 November 1958	15 March 1962	3 years, 122 days	
−	Kevin Thomas Kelly (Acting)	^{A}	15 March 1962	10 June 1962	87 days	
−	Bill Pritchett (Acting)	^{A}	10 June 1962	21 February 1963	256 days	
6	James Plimsoll	^{A}	21 February 1963	28 January 1965	1 year, 342 days	
7	Arthur Tange	^{A}	28 January 1965	25 January 1970	4 years, 362 days	
−	Rob Laurie (Acting)	^{A}	25 January 1970	1 March 1970	35 days	
8	Patrick Shaw	^{A}	1 March 1970	26 September 1973	3 years, 209 days	
9	Bruce Grant	^{A}	26 September 1973	15 December 1975	2 years, 80 days	
10	Peter Curtis	^{A}	26 February 1976	5 December 1979	3 years, 282 days	
11	Gordon Upton	^{A}	5 December 1979	31 May 1984	4 years, 178 days	
12	Graham Feakes	^{A}	31 May 1984	November 1990	6 years, 5 months	
13	David Evans	n/a	November 1990	February 1994	3 years, 3 months	
14	Darren Gribble	n/a	February 1994	25 July 1997	3 years, 5 months	
15	Rob Laurie	n/a	25 July 1997	28 August 2001	4 years, 34 days	
16	Penny Wensley	^{B}	28 August 2001	9 August 2004	2 years, 347 days	
17	John McCarthy	^{B}	9 August 2004	8 June 2009	4 years, 303 days	
18	Peter Varghese	^{B}	8 June 2009	30 December 2012	3 years, 205 days	
19	Patrick Suckling	^{B}	30 December 2012	11 February 2016	3 years, 43 days	
20	Harinder Sidhu	^{B}	11 February 2016	18 February 2020	4 years, 7 days	
21	Barry O'Farrell	^{B}	21 May 2020	30 June 2023	6 years, 179 days	
22	Philip Green		1 July 2023		3 years, 138 days	

=== Notes ===
^A: Also non-resident Ambassador to Nepal, 1960–1986.
^B: Also non-resident Ambassador to Bhutan, 2002–present.

== Consuls-general ==
Location	Open	Consular district
Consulate-General, Mumbai	1967/1979	Maharashtra, Gujarat, Goa
Consulate-General, Chennai	2007	Andhra Pradesh, Karnataka, Kerala, Tamil Nadu, Telangana, Andaman and Nicobar Islands, Lakshadweep, Puducherry
Consulate-General, Kolkata	1970/2019	West Bengal, Arunachal Pradesh, Assam, Bihar, Chhattisgarh, Jharkhand, Manipur, Meghalaya, Mizoram, Nagaland, Odisha, Sikkim, Tripura
Consulate-General, Bengaluru	TBD	

=== Mumbai ===
The consulate-general was first opened in Bombay on the 21 August 1967, initially with a Deputy High Commissioner in charge until 1973, but was closed on the 30 April 1976 due to financial constraints, before being reopened on 6 February 1979. An Australian Trade Commission had been located in the city since 1939, with Roy Gollan (later high commissioner) serving as trade commissioner from 1939 to 1948.

Name	Start of term	End of term	References
John Melhuish (DHC)	21 August 1967	24 February 1973	
Thomas Venables Holland (DHC)	24 February 1973	13 May 1973	
C. A. Bromwich (DHC)	13 May 1973	6 March 1975	
Eric Hanfield	6 March 1975	30 April 1976	
Consulate closed
Robert Jolly (acting)	6 February 1979	4 October 1979	
John Dalrymple Colquhoun-Denvers	4 October 1979	15 April 1982	
Ian Tricks	15 April 1982	13 December 1984	
G. R. Hawker	13 December 1984	12 December 1986	
Gavan Bromilow	12 December 1986	14 December 1989	
Stephanie Daly	14 December 1989	10 January 1992	
J. N. Elliot	10 January 1992	May 1993	
Christopher Quirk	June 1993	1997	
	1997	2006	
Peter Forby	July 2006	6 July 2010	
Stephen Waters	6 July 2010	September 2013	
Mark Pierce	September 2013	19 August 2016	
Tony Huber	19 August 2016	25 February 2020	
Greg Wilcock	25 February 2020	14 April 2021	
Peter Truswell	14 April 2021	date	

=== Kolkata ===
On 18 June 1970, the post was originally opened as the Deputy High Commission, Calcutta, to replace the Trade Commission which had existed in the city since 1939. Like the Bombay post, the Deputy High Commission was downgraded to a consulate-general on 13 May 1973, before being closed in April 1976 due to budget constraints.

Name	Start of term	End of term	References
Douglas Sturkey (DHC)	18 June 1970	6 June 1972	
Brian Meade (DHC/CG)	6 June 1972	12 February 1975	
Rodney Hodgson	12 February 1975	30 April 1976	
Consulate closed
Andrew Ford	10 January 2019	April 2021	
Rowan Ainsworth	14 April 2021	January 2024	
Hugh Boylan	January 2024	Current	

=== Chennai ===
In 2023 Chennai received a new Consul General (name TBC). The departure of Sarah Kirlew was seen as a sad day.

Name	Start of term	End of term	References
Aminur Rahman	January 2007	July 2010	
David Holly	July 2010	January 2014	
Sean Kelly	January 2014	November 2017	
Susan Grace	November 2017	March 2021	
Sarah Kirlew	March 2021	date	
