= Bob Armstrong (public servant) =

Australian public servant

Bob Armstrong OBE

Secretary of the Department of Immigration
- In office 25 May 1971 – 12 June 1974

Personal details
- Born: 24 July 1911 Erskineville, Sydney
- Died: 19 February 1988 (aged 76) Canberra
- Spouse: Gwen Isabel Jobson
- Occupation: Public servant

Robert Edward Armstrong (24 July 1911 – 19 February 1988) was a senior Australian public servant and policy maker. Between May 1971 and June 1974 he was Secretary of the Department of Immigration.

== Life and career ==
Bob Armstrong was born on 24 July 1911 in Erskineville, Sydney.

In 1940, Armstrong enlisted in the Australian Imperial Force. Posted to the 7th Division headquarters as a clerk, he served in Egypt, Palestine, Africa, Syria and Java.

Between 1971 and 1974, he was secretary of the Department of Immigration.

Armstrong died in Canberra on 19 February 1988.

== Awards ==
In 1967, Armstrong was made an Officer of the Order of the British Empire while Assistant Secretary of the Immigration Department.

Government offices
Preceded by Peter Heydon	Secretary of the Department of Immigration; 1971 – 1974	Succeeded by Ian Sharp as Secretary of the Department of Labor and Immigration
