= Letters from a Father to His Daughter =

Collection of letters written by Jawaharlal Nehru

- Book cover from the 2004 Puffin edition
- Author: Jawaharlal Nehru
- Translator: To Hindi by Munshi Premchand
- Illustrator: Puffin Books
- Language: English (original), Hindi, Spanish
- Publisher: Allahabad Law Journal Press
- Publication date: 1929
- Publication place: India
- OCLC: 47215515

Letters from a Father to His Daughter is a collection of letters written by Jawaharlal Nehru to his daughter Indira Nehru. The collection was originally published in 1929 by Allahabad Law Journal Press, at Nehru's request, and consists of 30 letters sent in the summer of 1928, when Indira was ten years old. Nehru arranged a second edition in 1931, and subsequent reprints and editions have been published.

The letters were primarily educational, covering subjects of natural and human history. At the time of writing, Nehru was in Allahabad while Indira resided in Mussoorie. The original letters in English were translated into Hindi by the novelist Munshi Premchand under the title Pita Ke Patra Putri Ke Naam.

In 2014, a Spanish translation, Cartas a mi hija Indira (Letters to my daughter Indira), was released by Rodolfo Zamora, including five additional letters. An amplified edition was released in Cuba in 2018, commemorating the 100th anniversary of correspondence between Jawaharlal Nehru and Indira Gandhi. On the same year, the book was published in China by CITIC Press under the title My Father Nehru's World History (Chinese: 爸爸尼赫鲁写给我的世界史; pinyin: Bàbà níhèlǔ xiě gěi wǒde shì jièshǐ), with translation done by Liang Benbin.

== See also ==
- Glimpses of World History (1934)
- An Autobiography (1936)
- The Discovery of India (1942–1946)
