= Charles Kevin =

Australian public servant and diplomat (1909–1968)

Charles Kevin CBE
- Born: John Charles George Kevin; 9 October 1909; Forbes, New South Wales
- Died: 13 February 1968 (aged 58); Pretoria, South Africa
- Resting place: Zanderfontein Cemetery
- Education: University of Sydney
- Occupations: Public servant, diplomat
- Spouses: Hermine Schick (m. 1939; div. 1962) Mary Therese Wilson (m. 1963)

John Charles George Kevin CBE (9 October 1909 – 13 February 1968) was an Australian public servant and diplomat.

== Life and career ==
Charles Kevin, as he was known, graduated from the University of Sydney law school.

In June 1945, Kevin joined the Department of External Affairs.

In 1948, Kevin was acting High Commissioner of Australia to India. Kevin and his wife Hermine separated in 1949. In 1951 Kevin's wife Hermine petitioned for divorce and was granted an order for restitution of conjugal rights; when Charles Kevin petitioned for divorce in January 1952 the request was rejected.

Kevin was posted Minister to Indonesia in 1953, an appointment that then Minister for external affairs Richard Casey, Baron Casey said was part of a planned policy to build up diplomatic relations in Asia's south east. While he was Minister, Australia and Indonesia signed a new trade agreement for the trade of goods worth over £5 million.

After his Indonesia posting, from 1955 to 1959, Kevin was an assistant secretary in the external affairs department in Canberra. He arrived for his next posting as High Commissioner to Ceylon in 1959, serving in that capacity until 1961. In Ceylon, Kevin met Mary Therese Wilson, an Englishwoman and began a new relationship, whilst still married to Hermine.

Kevin was appointed High Commissioner to Pakistan, in 1961 he arrived in the country in September that year.

His divorce was finally granted in 1962, while he was Ambassador-designate to South Africa. On 6 May 1963, Kevin married Mary Therese Wilson.

His appointment as Ambassador to Sweden was announced in September 1967, with the intention for the posting to take effect on the retirement of Bertram Ballard. Before he could leave for Sweden, on 13 February 1968, Kevin died of cancer while still in office in Pretoria. Kevin's body was buried at the Zanderfontein Cemetery near Pretoria in South Africa.

== Awards ==
In the 1964 Queen's Birthday Honours (Australia), Kevin was made a Commander of the Order of the British Empire during his time as Australian Ambassador in Cape Town.

Diplomatic posts
Preceded by Iven Mackay as High Commissioner	Australian High Commissioner to India (Acting); 1948	Succeeded by Roy Gollan as High Commissioner
Preceded by John Hood	Australian Minister to Indonesia; 1953–1955	Succeeded by Walter Crocker
Preceded by Allan Eastman	Australian High Commissioner to Ceylon; 1959–1961	Succeeded by Bertram Ballard
Preceded by Roden Cutler	Australian High Commissioner to Pakistan; 1961–1962	Succeeded by David McNicol
Preceded by Owen Davis (diplomat)	Australian Ambassador to South Africa; 1962–1968	Succeeded by Bill Cutts
