= John Hood (diplomat) =

Australian diplomat

John Hood CBE
- Born: John Douglas Lloyd Hood; 31 May 1904; Adelaide, South Australia
- Died: 3 October 1991 (aged 87); France
- Education: University of Tasmania; University of Oxford
- Occupations: Public servant and diplomat

John Douglas Lloyd Hood CBE (31 May 1904 – 3 October 1991) was an Australian diplomat who served as Australia's second permanent representative to the United Nations and ambassador to Germany.

== Early life and education ==
John Hood was born in Adelaide on 31 May 1904, the son of William Percy Hood and Alexandrina Douglas. His father was the head of the Tasmanian branch of the Australian Mutual Provident Society and Hood was educated at Kyne College in Adelaide (1915–1917) and The Hutchins School in Sandy Bay, Tasmania (1918–1921). After taking a Bachelor of Arts at the University of Tasmania, at age 21 Hood's academic success was recognised in 1926 with the award of being Tasmania's recipient of the Rhodes Scholarship to study at the University of Oxford. Resident at Magdalen College, Oxford, Hood studied under C. S. Lewis and took a First in Philosophy, Politics and Economics in 1929 and a Bachelor of Arts in 1930.

== Diplomatic career ==
On graduating, Hood aspired to a career in Journalism and took a position with The Times of London, where within a few years he was promoted to the post of a sub-editor. His work in the area of politics gained the attention of the Australian Department of External Affairs, which he joined in 1936 and took the role of liaison officer for the Department at the High Commission in London. In 1939 he was posted to Canberra and served in various posts in the department, including periods acting as secretary of the department.

Hood's first high-level posting was on 16 October 1945 when he was sent to The Hague in the Netherlands to set up a new resident legation as chargé d'affaires. After completing this posting by 1946, Hood acted as political adviser to the Australian Military Mission in Berlin and in 1947 was appointed to succeed Paul Hasluck as the second Permanent Representative of Australia to the United Nations in New York City. As Australia served as a non-permanent member of the first United Nations Security Council, Hood served on the council and as president of that body in December 1947. In January 1947, Hood served on the United Nations Commission for Investigation of Greek Frontier Incidents (also first chairman) and later in May 1947 as Australia's representative on the United Nations Special Committee on Palestine. During his time in Mandate Palestine with the committee, his conduct was criticized by other members of the delegation, among them Ralph Bunche, for going out drinking at night, raising a ruckus and failing to show up for meetings in the morning.

On 22 April 1950, Hood was appointed by Foreign Minister Percy Spender as Australia's first Ambassador to Indonesia. The post was considered an important one, with The Advocate opining that Australia should be offer advice and technical assistance to the Sukarno Government as Indonesia was "suffering the growing pains of nationhood". Hood was recalled to Australia briefly in May 1950 to discuss matters relating to Indonesia's claim to western New Guinea and the death of an Australian pilot, John Doderick, who was fatally shot in Jakarta that month.

Serving in Indonesia until 1952, Hood was appointed in September 1952 as Ambassador to Germany, on 4 September he presented to President Theodor Heuss. As ambassador in Bonn, Hood also became the head of Australia's Military Mission in Berlin. In January 1955 Hood was awarded with the Commander of the Order of the British Empire (CBE). In 1956 Foreign Minister Richard Casey recalled Hood from Bonn to advise him on Cold War matters. In 1957 he was elected President of the United Nations Trusteeship Council. In March 1963 Hood was appointed as Ambassador to Israel, serving until his retirement from foreign service September 1964.

== Later life and death ==
After his retirement, Hood spent his last years at Le Bar-sur-Loup in the south of France. Hood died in France on 3 October 1991.

Diplomatic posts
Preceded by Stanley Bruce as Minister	Chargé d'affaires of Australia in the Netherlands; 1945 – 1946	Succeeded by Keith Officer as Minister
Preceded by Paul Hasluck	Permanent Representative of Australia to the United Nations; 1947 – 1950	Succeeded by Keith Shann (acting)
Preceded by Warren Austin	President of the United Nations Security Council; December 1947	Succeeded by Fernand van Langenhove
Preceded by Charles Eaton as Consul-General	Ambassador of Australia to Indonesia; 1950 – 1952	Succeeded by Charles Kevin
Preceded by Noël Deschamps as Chargé d'affaires	Ambassador of Australia to Germany; 1952 – 1956	Succeeded by Patrick Shaw
Preceded by Mason Sears	President of the United Nations Trusteeship Council; 1957	Succeeded by Emilio Arenales
Preceded by John McMillan	Ambassador of Australia to Israel; 1963 – 1964	Succeeded by William Landale
