= Patrick Shaw (diplomat) =

Australian public servant and diplomat

Sir Patrick Shaw CBE
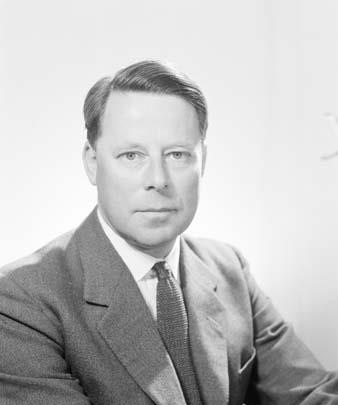

9th Ambassador of Australia to the United States
- In office 21 February 1974 – 27 December 1975
- Preceded by: James Plimsoll (Ambassador to the United States of America)
- Succeeded by: Gordon Upton

Personal details
- Born: Patrick Shaw; 18 September 1913 Kew, Victoria Australia
- Died: 27 December 1975 (aged 62) Washington, D.C. United States
- Spouse: Catherine Helen Jeffree (m. 1938)
- Children: Karina, Janet
- Occupation: Public servant, diplomat

Sir Patrick Shaw CBE (18 September 1913 – 27 December 1975) was an Australian public servant and diplomat.

Shaw joined the Department of External Affairs in 1939. He worked in the department's political section until 1941 when he was sent on his first overseas posting as third secretary in Australia's Tokyo legation. Shaw and other legation staff were taken as prisoners of war when war broke out.

In 1973, Prime Minister Gough Whitlam announced Shaw's appointment as Ambassador to the United States. While in the role, Shaw suffered a fatal heart attack. He died on 27 December 1975. Ambassador Shaw's wife, Lady Shaw, was a victim of a street attack in Washington, D.C., for which she received ex gratia remuneration from the United States Government.

Shaw's daughter, Karina Campbell (née Shaw) followed her father in working in the Australian diplomatic service. Karina Campbell joined the then-Department of External Affairs in 1963 and later held a range of senior positions in the department.

Diplomatic posts
Preceded by William Macmahon Ball	Australian Ambassador to Japan; 1947–1949	Succeeded by William Roy Hodgson
Preceded by Bertram Ballard	Permanent Representative of Australia to the United Nations Office in Geneva; 1951–1953	Succeeded by Ralph Harry
Preceded by John Hood	Australian Ambassador to the Federal Republic of Germany; 1956–1959	Succeeded by Alan Watt
Preceded by Laurence McIntyre	Australian Ambassador to Indonesia; 1960–1962	Succeeded by Mick Shann
Preceded by David Hay	Permanent Representative of Australia to the United Nations; 1965–1970	Succeeded by Laurence McIntyre
Preceded by Arthur Tange	Australian High Commissioner to India; Australian Ambassador to Nepal; 1970–1973	Succeeded by Bruce Grant
Preceded by James Plimsoll	Australian Ambassador to the United States; 1974–1975	Succeeded by Gordon Upton as Charge d'Affaires
