= List of high commissioners of Australia to South Africa =

High Commissioner of Australia to South Africa

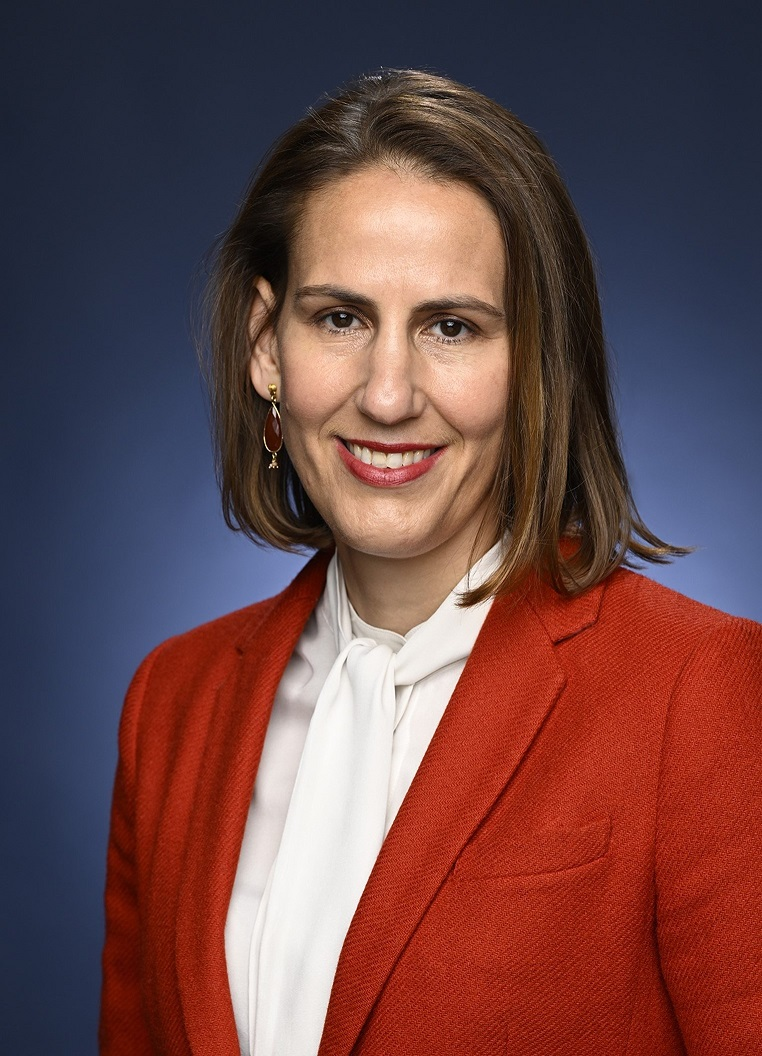
- Incumbent; Tegan Brink since 28 January 2023
- Department of Foreign Affairs and Trade
- Style: Her Excellency
- Reports to: Minister for Foreign Affairs
- Seat: Arcadia, Pretoria
- Nominator: Prime Minister of Australia
- Appointer: Governor General of Australia
- Inaugural holder: George Knowles
- Formation: 21 August 1946
- Website: Australian High Commission Pretoria

The high commissioner of Australia to South Africa, known from 1961 to 1994 as the ambassador of Australia to South Africa, is an officer of the Australian Department of Foreign Affairs and Trade and the head of the high commission of the Commonwealth of Australia to South Africa in Pretoria. The position has the rank and status of an ambassador extraordinary and plenipotentiary and is currently held by Tegan Brink since 28 January 2023.

The ambassador also holds non-resident accreditation as high commissioner to Botswana (1973–1981, since 2004), Eswatini (since 1973), Lesotho (since 1973), Mozambique (since 2004), and Namibia (since 2010); and as Ambassador to Angola (since 2010), and the representative to the Southern African Development Community. The high commission also has oversight for Honorary Consulates in Luanda, Angola, and Maputo, Mozambique.

== Posting history ==
The Australian Government has offered diplomatic representation in Pretoria, South Africa since 1946. Between 1961 and 1994 the designation of the Australian representative in South Africa changed from high commissioner to ambassador. On 9 July 1973, ambassador Colin Moodie received non-resident accreditation as Australia's first high commissioner to Botswana, Lesotho and Swaziland.

== Heads of mission ==
| # | Officeholder | Title | Other offices | Term start date | Term end date | Time in office | Notes |
|---|---|---|---|---|---|---|---|
| 1 | George Knowles | High Commissioner | | 21 August 1946 | August 1948 | 1 year, 11 months | |
| 2 | Alfred Stirling | High Commissioner | | August 1948 | 29 March 1951 | 2 years, 7 months | |
| − | John Quinn (Acting) | High Commissioner | | 29 March 1951 | 22 July 1952 | 1 year, 115 days | |
| 3 | William Hodgson | High Commissioner | | 22 July 1952 | 3 July 1957 | 4 years, 346 days | |
| − | Hugh Gilchrist (Acting) | High Commissioner | | 3 July 1957 | 7 January 1959 | 1 year, 188 days | |
| 4 | Owen Davis | High Commissioner | | 7 January 1959 | 31 May 1961 | 3 years, 7 months | |
| 4 | Owen Davis | Ambassador | | 31 May 1961 | September 1962 | 3 years, 7 months | |
| 5 | Charles Kevin | Ambassador | | September 1962 | September 1968 | 6 years | |
| 6 | Bill Cutts | Ambassador | | September 1968 | September 1972 | 4 years | |
| 7 | Colin Moodie | Ambassador | ^{A}^{B}^{C} | September 1972 | August 1975 | 2 years, 11 months | |
| 8 | David McNicol | Ambassador | ^{A}^{B}^{C} | August 1975 | November 1977 | 2 years, 3 months | |
| 9 | Keith Douglas-Scott | Ambassador | ^{A}^{B}^{C} | November 1977 | October 1981 | 3 years, 11 months | |
| 10 | Malcolm Lyon | Ambassador | ^{A}^{B} | October 1981 | December 1984 | 3 years, 2 months | |
| 11 | Robert Birch | Ambassador | ^{A}^{B} | December 1984 | July 1988 | 3 years, 7 months | |
| 12 | Colin McDonald | Ambassador | ^{A}^{B} | July 1988 | August 1992 | 4 years, 1 month | |
| 13 | Ross Burns | Ambassador | ^{A}^{B} | August 1992 | 1 June 1994 | 3 years, 2 months | |
| 13 | Ross Burns | High Commissioner | ^{A}^{B} | 1 June 1994 | October 1995 | 3 years, 2 months | |
| 14 | Ian Porter | High Commissioner | ^{A}^{B} | October 1995 | 5 May 1998 | 2 years, 7 months | |
| 15 | David Connolly | High Commissioner | ^{A}^{B} | 5 May 1998 | 13 March 2002 | 3 years, 312 days | |
| 16 | Ian Wilcock | High Commissioner | ^{A}^{B} | 13 March 2002 | 10 June 2004 | 2 years, 89 days | |
| 17 | Philip Green | High Commissioner | ^{A}^{B}^{C}^{D}^{E} | 10 June 2004 | 25 November 2008 | 4 years, 168 days | |
| 18 | Ann Harrap | High Commissioner | ^{A}^{B}^{C}^{D}^{E}^{F} | 25 November 2008 | 11 February 2014 | 5 years, 78 days | |
| 19 | Graeme Wilson | High Commissioner | ^{A}^{B}^{C}^{D}^{E}^{F} | 11 February 2014 | 2 September 2014 | 203 days | |
| − | Chris Munn (Acting) | High Commissioner | ^{A}^{B}^{C}^{D}^{E}^{F} | 2 September 2014 | 1 April 2015 | 211 days | |
| 20 | Adam McCarthy | High Commissioner | ^{A}^{B}^{C}^{D}^{E}^{F} | 1 April 2015 | 2 March 2019 | 3 years, 335 days | |
| 21 | Gita Kamath | High Commissioner | ^{A}^{B}^{C}^{D}^{E}^{F} | 2 March 2019 | 18 November 2022 | 7 years, 180 days | |
| 22 | Tegan Brink | High Commissioner | ^{A}^{B}^{C}^{D}^{E}^{F} | 28 January 2023 | Incumbent | 2 years, 1 day | |

=== Notes ===
^A Also non-resident high commissioner to Eswatini (Swaziland before 2018), 1973–present.
^B Also non-resident high commissioner to Lesotho, 1973–present.
^C Also non-resident high commissioner to Botswana, 1973–1981, 2004–present.
^D Also non-resident high commissioner to Mozambique, 2004–present.
^E Also non-resident high commissioner to Namibia, 2004–present.
^F Also non-resident ambassador to Angola, 2010–present.

== See also ==
- Australia–South Africa relations
- Foreign relations of Australia
- Foreign relations of South Africa
