= James Plimsoll =

Australian diplomat and public servant

The Honourable Sir James Plimsoll AC, CBE
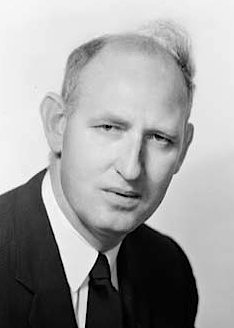
- Plimsoll in 1958

22nd Governor of Tasmania
- In office 1 October 1982 – 8 May 1987
- Monarch: Elizabeth II
- Premier: Doug Lowe (1981); Harry Holgate (1981–82); Robin Gray (1982–87)
- Preceded by: Sir Stanley Burbury
- Succeeded by: Sir Phillip Bennett

Secretary of the Department of External Affairs
- In office 5 April 1965 – April 1970
- Preceded by: Sir Arthur Tange
- Succeeded by: Sir John Waller

Permanent Representative of Australia to the United Nations
- In office 1959–1963
- Preceded by: Sir Edward Ronald Walker
- Succeeded by: Sir David Hay

8th Ambassador of Australia to the United States
- In office 8 June 1970 – 1 January 1973
- Preceded by: Keith Waller
- Succeeded by: Patrick Shaw

High Commissioner to the United Kingdom
- In office March 1980 – 25 March 1981
- Preceded by: Gordon Freeth
- Succeeded by: Victor Garland

Personal details
- Born: 25 April 1917 Sydney, New South Wales
- Died: 8 May 1987 (aged 70) Hobart, Tasmania
- Education: University of Sydney

Military service
- Allegiance: Australia
- Branch/service: Second Australian Imperial Force
- Years of service: 1942–1947
- Rank: Major
- Battles/wars: Second World War

Sir James Plimsoll, AC, CBE (25 April 1917 – 8 May 1987) was an Australian diplomat and public servant. He served variously as Permanent Representative to the United Nations (1959–1963), High Commissioner to India (1963–1965), Secretary of the Department of External Affairs (1965–1970), Ambassador to the United States (1970–1973), Ambassador to the Soviet Union (1974–1977), Ambassador to Belgium and the European Economic Community (1977–1980), High Commissioner to the United Kingdom (1980–1981), Ambassador to Japan (1981–1982), and Governor of Tasmania (1982–1987).

== Early life ==
Plimsoll was born in Sydney, New South Wales, and educated at Sydney Boys High School from 1929 to 1933. He graduated from the University of Sydney with a Bachelor of Economics in 1938 and a Bachelor of Arts in 1941. He was then appointed to the Bank of New South Wales as an economist.

With the outbreak of the Second World War, Plimsoll enlisted in the Second Australian Imperial Force in 1942. During the war he was attached to the Directorate of Research and Civil Affairs. In 1945 he was a member of the Australian delegation to the Far Eastern Commission, established to oversee the Allied Council for Japan, which was responsible for the occupation of Japan. At the end of the war, he was on the staff of the Australian School of Pacific Administration, then with the rank of major. He was appointed a First Secretary of the Department of External Affairs in 1948.

== Korean War ==
Plimsoll was appointed the Australian representative on the United Nations Commission for Unification and Rehabilitation of Korea (UNCURK) in 1950, during the Korean War.

Plimsoll had a considerable influence on President Syngman Rhee, to whom he conveyed the views of the United Nations and the troop-contributing nations. He also expressed the Western nations' concerns about Rhee's undemocratic behaviour and abuse of human rights.

== Diplomatic career ==
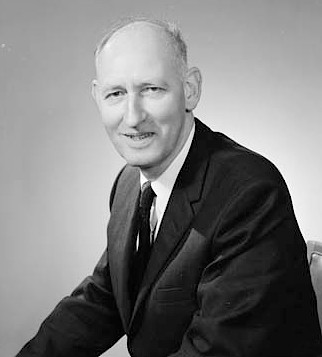
Plimsoll in 1965

In 1953, Plimsoll returned to Department of External Affairs. He was appointed as Australia's Permanent Representative to the United Nations in 1959 and he became Australia's High Commissioner to India and Ambassador to Nepal in 1962. In 1965, he became head of the Department of External Affairs.

In 1970, Plimsoll was appointed as Ambassador to the United States of America, a job normally reserved in Australia for senior ex-politicians. In 1974, he became Ambassador to the Union of Soviet Socialist Republics. He was appointed as Ambassador to Belgium, Luxembourg and the European Economic Community in 1977.

In February 1980, Plimsoll was named High Commissioner to the United Kingdom, replacing political appointee Gordon Freeth. He was the first career diplomat appointed to the position. However, in November 1980 the government announced that his term would be cut short in order to appoint another political appointee, Vic Garland. This decision proved controversial in both Australia and the UK. It was reported that the British foreign secretary Lord Carrington told a public function that Plimsoll had been "treated very shabbily", and that both Queen Elizabeth II and Prime Minister Margaret Thatcher had expressed their surprise at the shortness of his term. The Administrative and Clerical Officers Association, a leading public-sector union, described the appointment as "another example of the Fraser government's shoddy disregard for the career Public Service". Plimsoll left London in March 1981 and took up his final diplomatic post as Ambassador to Japan.

Plimsoll was described by the Minister for Foreign Affairs, Alexander Downer, in 2006 as Australia's "greatest Ambassador".

== Governor of Tasmania ==
In November 1981, it was announced that Plimsoll would succeed Stanley Burbury as Governor of Tasmania. His nomination as governor was one of Doug Lowe's last actions as premier. Plimsoll was sworn in as governor on 1 October 1982. He had no previous connections with Tasmania but had visited it a number of times. He was only the second bachelor to serve in the office, and he took on all the patronages normally held by the governor's spouse. He was popular in the state and his appointment was extended at the end of five years.

Plimsoll suffered a mild heart attack in May 1985. He died on 8 May 1987 following another heart attack, hours after attending a ceremony marking the anniversary of the Battle of the Coral Sea. His death came in the middle of a constitutional crisis relating to the Liberal Party's unwillingness to allow John Devereux to fill the casual vacancy caused by the resignation of Australian Labor Party senator Don Grimes. Plimsoll was accorded a state memorial service at St David's Cathedral in Hobart, attended by the Governor-General of Australia and four other state governors. His remains were transported to Sydney for interment.

== Awards and honours ==
- 1956 — awarded Commander of the Order of the British Empire
- 1962 — created a Knight Bachelor
- 1978 — appointed a Companion of the Order of Australia
- 1982 — appointed a Knight of the Order of St John
- 1984 — Admitted to degree of Doctor of Science in Economics at the University of Sydney
- 1987 — Admitted to degree of Doctor of Laws at the University of Tasmania
- 2009 — A street in the Canberra suburb of Casey was named Plimsoll Drive in Sir James' honour.

== Footnotes ==
Diplomatic posts
Preceded by Sir Edward Ronald Walker	Permanent Representative of Australia to the United Nations; 1959–1963	Succeeded by David Hay
Preceded by Bill Pritchett as Acting High Commissioner	Australian High Commissioner to India; 1963–1965	Succeeded by Arthur Tange
Preceded by Sir Keith Waller	Australian Ambassador to the United States; 1970–1973	Succeeded by Patrick Shaw
Preceded by Lawrence John Lawrey	Australian Ambassador to the Soviet Union; 1974–1977	Succeeded by Murray Bourchier
Preceded by James Cumes	Australian Ambassador to Belgium; 1977–1980	Succeeded by Roy Fernandez
Preceded by Sir Gordon Freeth	Australian High Commissioner to the United Kingdom; 1980–1981	Succeeded by Sir Victor Garland
Preceded by John Menadue	Australian Ambassador to Japan; 1981–1982	Succeeded by Neil Currie
Government offices
Preceded by Sir Stanley Burbury	Governor of Tasmania; 1982–1987	Succeeded by Sir Phillip Bennett
Preceded by Arthur Tange	Secretary of the Department of External Affairs; 1965–1970	Succeeded by Keith Waller
