= Department of Immigration =

Australian government department, 1945–1974

Department overview
- Formed: 13 July 1945
- Preceding Department: Department of the Interior (II)
- Dissolved: 12 June 1974
- Superseding Department: Department of Labor and Immigration – for immigration Department of Foreign Affairs – for visa functions
- Jurisdiction: Commonwealth of Australia
- Department executives: Tasman Heyes, Secretary (1946–1961); Peter Heydon, Secretary (1961–1971); Bob Armstrong, Secretary (1971–1974)

The Department of Immigration was an Australian government department that existed between July 1945 and June 1974.

== Scope ==
Information about the department's functions and government funding allocation could be found in the Administrative Arrangements Orders, the annual Portfolio Budget Statements and in the Department's annual reports.

At its creation, the Department's functions were:

- Admission of contract immigrants
- Deportation and Registration of Aliens
- Emigration of Children and Aboriginals
- Encouraged migration
- Immigration
- Indentured coloured labor
- Nationality and Naturalization
- Passports
- Publication of Newspapers in foreign languages
- Repatriation of destitute Australians

== Structure ==
The Department was a Commonwealth Public Service department, staffed by officials who were responsible to the Minister for Immigration.
