= Arthur Tange =

Australian public servant

Sir Arthur Tange AC, CBE
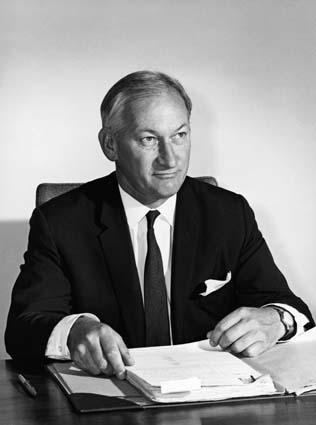
- Arthur Tange, 1965

Secretary of the Department of Defence
- In office 2 March 1970 – 16 August 1979
- Preceded by: Sir Henry Bland
- Succeeded by: Bill Pritchett

Australian High Commissioner to India
- In office 1965–1969
- Preceded by: Sir James Plimsoll
- Succeeded by: Sir Patrick Shaw

Secretary of the Department of External Affairs
- In office 25 January 1954 – 4 April 1965
- Preceded by: Alan Watt
- Succeeded by: Sir James Plimsoll

Personal details
- Born: 18 August 1914 Gosford, New South Wales
- Died: 10 May 2001 (aged 86) Canberra, Australian Capital Territory
- Spouse: Marjorie
- Occupation: Public servant

Sir Arthur Harold Tange AC, CBE (18 August 1914 – 10 May 2001) was a prominent Australian senior public servant of the middle to late 20th century.

Tange was considered one of the most influential people in the government of Australia for nearly 30 years, earning him respect and disdain in equal measure. He was best known for his controversial role in reforming the organisation of the administration of the Australian Department of Defence in the 1970s. He is also less well known for having laid the foundations of the modern Department of Foreign Affairs and Trade (DFAT) in his time at the then Department of External Affairs.

== Early life ==
Arthur Tange was of Danish descent; his grandfather Anton Tange emigrated in 1854 from Odense. Anton Tange & Sons became a major Sydney trading house, mainly in the tea trade. However, lack of business acumen in the following generation and the circumstances of the Depression greatly diminished the family fortune. Arthur attended Gosford High School, and later the University of Western Australia. He played rugby for Western Australia.

== Department of External Affairs ==
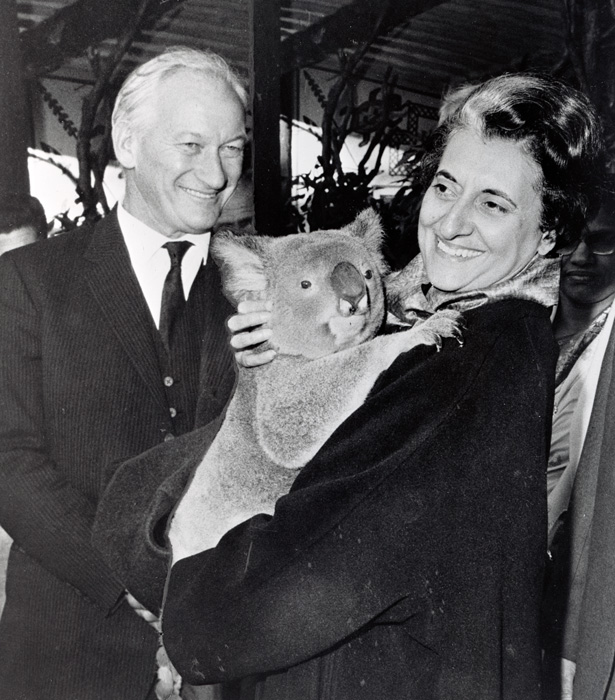
Indian Prime Minister Indira Gandhi holding a koala at Taronga Zoo in 1968, with Arthur Tange, Australian High Commissioner to India, in the background.

Tange joined the public service during World War II, having previously worked for the Bank of New South Wales 1931–42. He was a member of the small Australian contingent at the Bretton Woods Conference in 1944. Having rapidly risen from research assistant to departmental secretary in the Department of External Affairs (forerunner to the modern Department of Foreign Affairs and Trade) from 1954 to 1965, he then took up the position of High Commissioner to India from 1965 to 1969.

== Secretary, Department of Defence ==
In 1970, he returned to Australia to become Secretary of the Department of Defence – the most senior public servant therein, and effective executive head of the civilian side of the Department of Defence, reporting to the Minister, then John Gorton.

At that time the Department of Defence was of relatively little consequence in the Commonwealth government; each service (Navy, Army and Air Force) had its own separate department with its own minister. Further, the Ministry of Supply, responsible for military logistics, was also a separate portfolio with yet another minister. The respective services and departments were in competition, each group jealously guarding its own budget and powers against the others.

=== Rationalising departments ===
With his career background in diplomacy and international affairs, Tange felt that a co-ordinated administration of the Defence of Australia, integrating strictly military matters, supply and material acquisition, intelligence, defence-related economic affairs and international relations was needed. To this end he spent the bulk of his time as Secretary of the Department of Defence (1970 to his retirement in 1979) working towards the merging of the departments of the Army, Navy, Air, Supply and Defence into one. He advocated a wider view of defence policy than the civilian members of the Defence department and the uniformed members of the armed services.

His work culminated in a 1973 report, formally titled "Australian Defence: Report on the Reorganisation of the Defence Group of Departments", but widely known in the press and in government circles as "the Tange Report". With the support of the Whitlam Labor government, the proposed changes were enacted and since then the uniformed services have been known as the Australian Defence Force (ADF), the civilian arms as the Department of Defence, and the whole as the Australian Defence Organisation (ADO). The Prime Minister and Minister for Defence are now advised by both the uniformed Chief of the Defence Force (CDF) and the civilian Secretary of the Department of Defence (SECDEF), in a unique (in Australia) arrangement known as "the diarchy", with overall defence policy being developed and enacted co-operatively between the uniformed and civilian staffs.

=== Tri-service co-operation ===
Another aspect of Tange's work was a desire that the three services should work together in the Defence of Australia at all levels, rather than as feuding tribes.

To this end he was instrumental in the decision to set up a primary tri-service college for the joint training, academic and military, of all officer recruits in the services, known as the Australian Defence Force Academy. A further motive for developing the academy (which is an affiliated academic college of the University of New South Wales) was to equip the future leaders of the defence forces with a broader humanistic perspective, as well as a technical education, to enable them to eventually make the wider contributions to defence policy that Tange felt was lacking in the senior uniformed officers of his generation. The Australian Defence Force Academy (ADFA) was opened in 1983, in Canberra, and most military officers since then have received their tertiary education and basic military training in its tri-service environment.

=== Reputation ===
Neither of these reforms was easy and they were both accompanied by enormous resistance and press clamour. Tradition within the old service departments led to fights over these issues in the press, the ministries and the parliament in the 1970s. Tange's role in the changes saw him regarded as both a forward-looking visionary, and as displaying arrogance and ignorance and being zealously committed to secrecy. The conservative forces in the military and coalition parties in Australia often regarded him as a man bent on destroying the sensible and time-honoured traditions of the individual services, whilst the political left in the universities, unions and labour movement saw him as a prime example of the old public service 'mandarin' who told his ministers what to do and pursued a conservative agenda no matter who was in government at the time.

== Retirement and legacy ==
Tange retired in 1979 and lived until 2001, when he died of leukaemia. His wife of 60 years, Marjorie, died two months later after a series of strokes.

In 2002, the Department of Defence, in conjunction with the Strategic and Defence Studies Centre (SDSC) at the Australian National University (ANU), established an ongoing PhD scholarship in honour of Tange. The first of these scholarships was awarded in 2003, and another in 2007.

The first independent biography of Tange, Arthur Tange: Last of the Mandarins by Peter Edwards, was published in 2006. Edwards has also edited and published Tange's personal memoirs in Defence Policy-Making: A Close-up View, 1950–1980, released in 2008.

In 2009, a street in the Canberra suburb of Casey was named Arthur Tange Street in Tange's honour.

== Further reading and external links ==
- Downer, Alexander (24 May 2001), Speech at the memorial service for the late Sir Arthur Tange, Parliament House, Canberra: Department of Foreign Affairs and Trade, archived from the original on 20 June 2001
- Sir John Kerr conferring Companion of Order of Australia on Sir Arthur Tange, National Library of Australia, 31 August 1977
- Edwards, Peter (2006). Arthur Tange: Last of the Mandarins. Allen & Unwin. ISBN 978-1-74114-642-4.
- Tange, Arthur (2008). Edwards, Peter (ed.). Defence Policy-Making: A Close-Up View, 1950–1980. A Personal Memoir. Canberra Papers on Strategy and Defence No. 169. Canberra: ANU E-Press. ISBN 978-1-921313-86-8.
- Howard, John (10 May 2001). "Sir Arthur Tange AC CBE" (Press release). Archived from the original on 8 May 2014.

Government offices
| Preceded by Alan Watt | Secretary of the Department of External Affairs; 1954–1965 | Succeeded by Sir James Plimsoll |
| Preceded by Sir Henry Bland | Secretary of the Department of Defence; 1970–1979 | Succeeded by Bill Pritchett |
Diplomatic posts
| Preceded by Sir James Plimsoll | Australian High Commissioner to India; 1965–1969 | Succeeded by Sir Patrick Shaw |
