= Walter Crocker =

Australian diplomat, writer and war veteran

The Honourable Sir Walter Crocker KBE
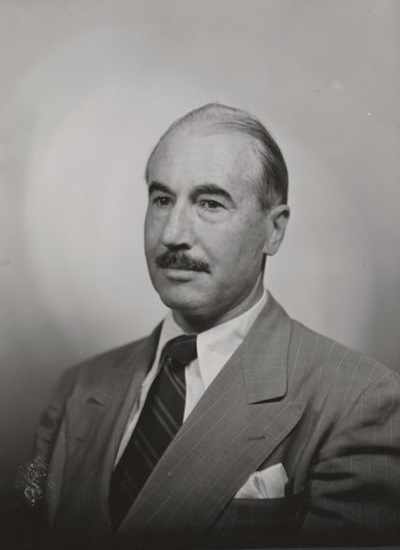
- Sir Walter Crocker in 1953

Administrator of South Australia
- In office 30 April 1977 – 1 September 1977
- Preceded by: Douglas Nicholls (as Governor)
- Succeeded by: Keith Seaman (as Governor)

Lieutenant-Governor of South Australia
- In office 3 September 1973 – 27 June 1982
- Governor: Mark Oliphant (1973–1976); Douglas Nicholls (1976–1977); Keith Seaman (1977–1982); Donald Dunstan (1982)
- Preceded by: Mellis Napier
- Succeeded by: Condor Laucke

Personal details
- Born: Walter Russell Crocker; 25 March 1902 Broken Hill, New South Wales
- Died: 14 November 2002 (aged 100) Henley Beach, South Australia
- Spouse: Claire Ward (m. 1951)
- Occupation: Public servant, diplomat

Sir Walter Russell Crocker KBE (25 March 1902 – 14 November 2002) was an Australian diplomat, writer and war veteran.

== Life and career ==
Crocker was born in Broken Hill, New South Wales, the eldest son of Robert Crocker and Alma Bray. He served in World War II with the British Army, becoming a lieutenant colonel.

He was ambassador or high commissioner to eleven countries, including India (twice), Indonesia, Canada, Italy, Belgium, Nepal, the Netherlands, Ethiopia, Kenya and Uganda. He headed the Department of International Relations at the Research School of Pacific (and Asian) Studies, Australian National University, 1949–1954.

Crocker was a Lieutenant-Governor of South Australia for more than nine years. He and his wife, Claire, had two sons, Robert and Christopher.

Crocker was interviewed in 1977, by T.B. Miller. The interview can be found at the National Library of Australia.

== Books ==
Crocker authored a well-received biography of Jawaharlal Nehru titled Nehru: A Contemporary's Estimate (1966).

== Awards ==
Crocker was made a Commander of the Order of the British Empire in 1955 while Australian Ambassador to Indonesia. He was later promoted to Knight Commander of the Order of the British Empire (KBE) in 1977, in recognition of his service to the public.

Diplomatic posts
Preceded by Roy Gollan	Australian High Commissioner to India; 1952 – 1955	Succeeded by Peter Heydon
Preceded by Charles Kevin	Australian Ambassador to Indonesia; 1955 – 1957	Succeeded by Laurence McIntyre
Preceded by Douglas Copland	Australian High Commissioner to Canada; 1957 – 1958	Succeeded by Walter Cawthorn
Preceded by Peter Heydon	Australian High Commissioner to India; 1958 – 1962	Succeeded by Bill Pritchett as Acting High Commissioner
Preceded by Edwin McCarthy	Australian Ambassador to the Netherlands; 1962 – 1965	Succeeded by Roden Cutler
New title	Australian High Commissioners to Kenya; 1965 – 1967	Succeeded by Robert Hamilton
Preceded by Alfred Stirling	Australian Ambassador to Italy; 1967 – 1970	Succeeded by Malcolm Booker
Government offices
Preceded by John Jefferson Bray	Lieutenant-Governor of South Australia; 1973–1982	Succeeded by Sir Condor Laucke
