= Glimpses of World History =

Book by Jawaharlal Nehru

- Author: Jawaharlal Nehru
- Genre: History
- Publisher: Penguin Books
- Publication date: 1934
- Pages: 1192
- ISBN: 978-0-19-562360-4
- OCLC: 21227307

Glimpses of World History is a book published by Jawaharlal Nehru in 1934. The book is subtitled Being further letters to his daughter, written in prison, and containing a rambling account of history for young people.

== Context ==
It is a collection of 196 letters on world history written between 1930 and 1933 in various prisons in British India: Naini and Bareilly prisons as well as at Dehradun; two letters were written aboard an Italian steamer in the Arabian sea.

The letters were addressed to his young daughter Indira and were meant to introduce her to world history. They were a continuation of the letters he sent to her in 1928, which were published as Letters from a Father to His Daughter.

The letters start off with one he sends to his daughter on her birthday. He says he is sad about not being able to send her any "material" gift from prison, so he would try to give her something he can "afford", a series of letters from his heart.

As it was written in different prisons, he had little recourse to reference books or a library but his personal notes.

The letters were not actually sent to his daughter and he kept them until his release from prison in 1933.

== Content ==
The letters on history are sprinkled with contemporary and personal events, things that happened to himself or his friends, colleagues or family members. At times the style is that of an intimate conversation with his daughter, who is at Anand Bhavan, in which he also anticipates her reactions and the feelings she might have when reading it. At other times he "provided a profoundly philosophical interpretation of world history".

Some letters are written on a daily basis and some have gaps in between of weeks and even months. Nehru stated in his preface that The Outline of History by English writer H. G. Wells was a major influence on the work. The book contains important aspects of the history of humankind from Ancient Greece (letter 6) to the time of writing the book, when Nehru anticipated a new major conflict arising (letter 195). In later editions, Nehru added notes at the end of some letters on 20th century events, with updates made in November 1938, as well as a postscript. According to an article by Arun Sharma for the National Herald, "Nehru’s books reveal the thinker, philosopher and a historian in him", with Glimpses of World History advocating for "a composite world view of history." Sharma writes that Nehru believed "history should be taught and understood as the story of human civilization as it developed in various parts of the world."

It could be considered as one of the first attempts at historiography from a non-Eurocentric angle. In particular, his letters on Genghis Khan and Mongol conquests ran counter to predominant European conceptions of the period. Prefacing his introduction to the Mongol Empire, which Nehru notes was larger than the British Empire and lasted as long, he wrote that "It would be foolish not to recognize the greatness of Europe. But it would be equally foolish to forget the greatness of Asia." And he goes on to state: "Genghis is, without doubt, the greatest military genius and leader in history.... Alexander and Caesar seem petty before him." According to American historian Jack Weatherford, this was possibly the first re-evaluation of the Mongol Empire since the 18th century. Editions from 1939 onwards included 50 maps designed by British cartoonist J. F. Horrabin.

== Reception ==
The New York Times described it as: "[...] one of the most remarkable books ever written [...]. Nehru makes even H.G. Wells seem singularly insular [...]. One is awed by the breadth of Nehru's culture."

A review by International Affairs describes it as "pleasant chatty", including "reflections on philosophy and politics" that make it an "extraordinarily agreeable book". In 1960, Saul K. Padover created an abridged version of the book, called Nehru on World History, which was published by John Day Company.

== Sources ==
- Nehru, Jawaharlal. Glimpses of World History. Penguin Books India. ISBN 0-670-05818-1

== See also ==
- Letters from a Father to His Daughter (1928)

Also written during Nehru's imprisonments:

- An Autobiography (1936)
- The Discovery of India (1942–46)
