= Alfred Stirling =

Australian diplomat (1902–1981)

Alfred Stirling CBE
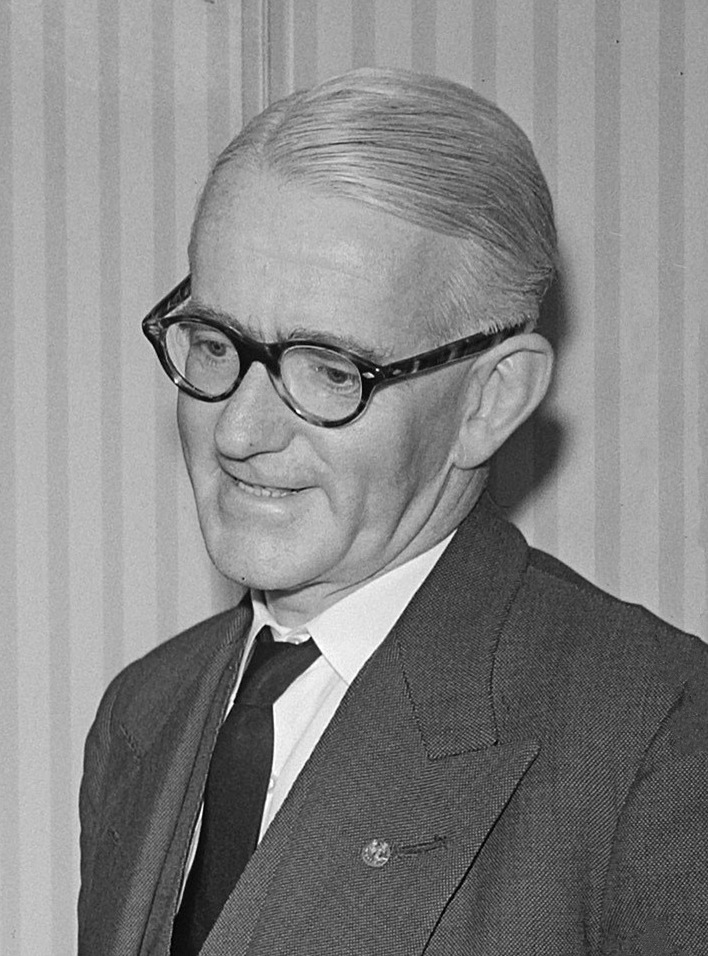
- Born: 8 September 1902; Melbourne, Australia
- Died: 3 July 1981 (aged 78); Melbourne, Australia
- Resting place: Melbourne General Cemetery
- Education: University of Melbourne (BA, MA, LLB)
- Occupation: Diplomat
- Spouse: Never married

Alfred Thorp Stirling CBE (8 September 1902 – 3 July 1981) was an Australian diplomat.

Stirling was the eldest of three children of Australian surgeon Robert Andrew Stirling and his second wife Isabella Jessie Matilda Oades-Thorp, a nurse from England. He graduated from the University of Melbourne (BA, 1922; MA, LL.B, 1924) where he excelled in French and won a W. T. Mollison scholarship for studying at University College, Oxford. He received his bachelor's degree there in 1927 and then worked as assistant to Robert Menzies in Melbourne. The two eventually became lifelong friends, and when Menzies became attorney-general he appointed Stirling as his secretary (1934–36).

Stirling joined the Department of External Affairs in Canberra, where he headed the political section for a year. In 1937 he was sent to London as a liaison officer with the United Kingdom, and stayed there through World War II. In the meantime he was appointed an Officer of the Order of the British Empire in 1941. After the war (1945–46) he became high commissioner in Ottawa, where he fully employed his knowledge of French. In 1947–1948, he was for fifteen months the minister in Washington, United States, and in 1948 appointed as high commissioner to South Africa.

After becoming prime minister in 1949, Menzies sent Stirling to the Netherlands, where he served as Australian ambassador from 1950 to 1955. While staying there Stirling helped soften the Dutch position to the territorial claims of Indonesia, and was appointed Commander of the Order of the British Empire in 1953. After that he was ambassador to France (1955–59), Philippines (1959–62), Italy (1962–67) and Greece (1964–65). For his diplomatic services he received Knight Grand Cross of the Order of St. Gregory the Great (1963) and Order of George I of Greece (1964). He retired in 1967, declined a knighthood, and returned to Melbourne, where he wrote seven books in the 1970s. He died in 1981 in East Melbourne and was buried in the Melbourne General Cemetery.

Stirling never married, and in his early diplomatic assignments was accompanied by his mother and sister Dorothy.

== Publications ==
- Alfred Thorp Stirling (1970). Joseph Bosisto. Hawthorn Press. ISBN 9780725600143.
- Alfred Thorp Stirling (1971). The Italian diplomat: and, Italy and Scotland. Hawthorn Press.
- Alfred Thorp Stirling (1972). Gang Forward: A Stirling Note-book. Hawthorn Press. ISBN 978-0-7256-0082-2.
- Alfred Thorp Stirling (1973). On the fringe of diplomacy. Hawthorn Press.
- Alfred Stirling (1974). Lord Bruce. Hawthorn Press. ISBN 978-0-7256-0125-6.
- Alfred Thorp Stirling (1975). A Distant View of the Vatican. Hawthorn Press. ISBN 978-0-7256-0159-1.
- Alfred Thorp Stirling (1979). Old Richmond. Hawthorn Press. ISBN 978-0-7256-0251-2.

Diplomatic posts
Preceded by Thomas Glasgow	Australian High Commissioners to Canada; 1945–1946	Succeeded by Frank Forde
Preceded by George Knowles	Australian High Commissioner to South Africa; 1948–1950	Succeeded by John Quinn as Acting High Commissioner
Preceded by Keith Officer as Minister to the Netherlands	Australian Ambassador to the Netherlands; 1950–1955	Succeeded by Hugh McClure Smith
Preceded by Keith Officer	Australian Ambassador to France; 1955–1959	Succeeded by Edward Ronald Walker
Preceded by Mick Shann	Australian Ambassador to the Philippines; 1959–1962	Succeeded by Bill Cutts
Preceded by Hugh McClure Smith	Australian Ambassador to Italy; 1962–1967	Succeeded by Walter Crocker
New title Australian embassy established in Athens	Australian Ambassador to Greece; 1964–1965	Succeeded by Jo Gullett
