= Malcolm Lyon (diplomat) =

Australian public servant and diplomat

Malcolm Lyon OBE
- Born: Malcolm Elliott Lyon; 18 September 1930; London, England
- Died: September 2007 (aged 77)
- Education: University of Adelaide (BA (Hons))
- Occupations: Public servant, diplomat
- Spouses: Robin Carne (m. 1955; died 1982) Diana Cole (m. 1984–2007)

Malcolm Elliott Lyon OBE (18 September 1930 – September 2007) was an Australian public servant and diplomat.

Born in London in 1930, Lyon moved to South Australia in 1940 when he and his mother emigrated from England. He studied at St Peter's College, Adelaide, before transferring as a boarder to Geelong College for his later schooling. He graduated with Bachelor of Arts degree from the University of Adelaide, where he was at St. Mark's College. In the middle of his degree he moved to France to study for a year at the Britannia Institute in Paris. Returning to Australia, he travelled with his mother and two friends overland from London to Mombasa before boarding a ship. Along the journey they encountered lions and crocodiles and had to dig themselves out of sand more than a dozen times, and met Tuareg people. Lyon described the 500 mile stretch south of Tamanrasset as the worst section of the trip.

Joining the Department of External Affairs as a cadet in 1954, his early assignments were to Germany, India, Sweden, New Zealand and Singapore. Whilst still a cadet, Lyon married Robin Marjorie Carne at St John the Baptist Church, Reid on 3 December 1955.

In the 1970s, Lyon spent a year in Papua New Guinea as deputy head of mission in the High Commission. He was a key player negotiating the 1978 Torres Strait Treaty, which defined the border between Papua New Guinea and Australia. It was for this work that in the 1979 Birthday Honours he was made an Officer of the Order of the British Empire.

From 1979 to 1981, Lyon was head of the South-East Asia and South Pacific division in the Department of Foreign Affairs. He was Australian Ambassador to South Africa from 1981 to 1984, during apartheid. The posting was not comfortable—the Australian Government opposed apartheid and Lyon had to make this point to South African officials continually, making diplomacy difficult. His wife Robin died during the posting, after a short and unexpected illness. Towards the end of his posting in South Africa, Lyon re-married, to Diana Cole, with whom he spent the rest of his life.

Retiring in 1987, Lyon suffered cardiac problems and had Alzheimer's in later life. He died in September 2007, aged 77.

Diplomatic posts
Preceded by Keith Douglas-Scott	Australian Ambassador to South Africa; Australian High Commissioner to Lesotho; Australian High Commissioner to Swaziland; 1981–1984	Succeeded by Robert Birch
