= Douglas Copland =

Australian academic and economist

Sir Douglas Copland KBE, CMG
- Born: Douglas Berry Copland; 24 February 1894; Otaio, South Canterbury, New Zealand
- Died: 27 September 1971 (aged 77); Kyneton, Victoria, Australia
- Known for: 1st Vice-Chancellor of the Australian National University; Founder of the Committee for Economic Development of Australia (CEDA)
- Spouse: Ruth Victoria Jones (m. 1919)
- Scientific career
- Fields: Economics
- Institutions: University of Tasmania; University of Melbourne; Australian National University

Sir Douglas Berry Copland KBE, CMG (24 February 1894 – 27 September 1971) was an Australian academic and economist.

== Biography ==
Douglas Copland was born in Otaio, New Zealand in 1894, the thirteenth of sixteen children. He was raised there and lived there till he was 21. In 1920, at the age of 26, he became Professor of Economics at the University of Tasmania. In 1924 Copland was appointed the Professor of Commerce (a post he held until 1944) and first Dean of the Faculty of Economics and Commerce at the University of Melbourne. He was also the Truby Williams Professor of Economics at the University of Melbourne 1944–45.

He is remembered for his interest in the application of economic analysis to practical problems. Copland helped found the Economic Society of Australia and New Zealand and was the first president of the Victorian Branch of the society and the first Editor in Chief of its journal The Economic Record. It is said of him that he "pioneered the development of the economics profession in Australia".

Amongst other things he was Commonwealth Prices Commissioner during the Second World War and Australian Minister to China (1946–48). He was appointed the first Vice-Chancellor of the Australian National University in 1948, a post he held until 1953 when he became Australian High Commissioner to Canada. He was a member of the Australian Delegation at the first United Nations General Assembly. He was Vice President of the United Nations Economic and Social Council (ECOSOC) during its 18th Session (June–August 1954) and President for the 19th and 20th Sessions (March–June, July–October 1955).

Copland is acknowledged as the founder of the Committee for Economic Development of Australia. In 1960 CEDA was established as one of Australia's first independent think tanks. CEDA's work fostering economic development, public debate and research and policy continues. Copland's legacy is acknowledged through the Copland leadership program run by CEDA in each Australian state and through the CEDA annual Copland lecture.

Copland died in 1971.

== Honours ==
Douglas Copland was appointed a Companion of the Order of St Michael and St George (CMG) in 1933.

He was elected to the American Philosophical Society in 1948.

He was knighted as a Knight Commander of the Order of the British Empire (KBE) in 1950.

The Copland Lecture Theatre in the Economics and Commerce Building at the University of Melbourne is named after Sir Douglas Copland. It is one of the largest lecture theatres in the University, seating approximately 450 people.

In 2011, the Faculty of Business and Economics offered fifteen scholarships to high-achieving students commencing the Bachelor of Commerce. These students are called the Copland Scholars in recognition of Sir Douglas Copland.

Diplomatic posts
Preceded by Keith Officer as Chargé d'affaires	Australian Minister to China; 1946–1948	Succeeded by Keith Officer
Academic offices
New title	1st Vice-Chancellor of the Australian National University; 1948–1953	Succeeded by Sir Leslie Melville
