= Nehru: A Contemporary's Estimate =

Book by Walter Crocker

- Author: Walter Crocker
- Language: English
- Subject: Jawaharlal Nehru
- Genre: Non-fiction (Biography)
- Publisher: Oxford University Press
- Publication date: 1966
- Publication place: United Kingdom/Australia

Nehru: A Contemporary's Estimate is a 1966 book written by Walter Crocker and published by Oxford University Press. It is a biography of Jawaharlal Nehru. The book was originally published with a foreword by Arnold Toynbee. It has been reprinted in 2009 by Random House India with a new foreword by Ramachandra Guha.

== Crocker ==
Crocker had served as the Australian High Commissioner to India between 1952 and 1955 and again from 1958 to 1962. This gave him a privileged opportunity to study Nehru, according to Arnold Toynbee, who declares in his foreword that this book will continue to be of interest to posterity because of Crocker's "first hand knowledge" which makes the book "priceless" and "irreplaceable". Historian Madhavan Palat, the series editor of Oxford University Press's Selected Works of Jawaharlal Nehru, notes that Crocker "was no blind admirer of the Prime Minister of the country he was accredited to. In fact, he rather admired some of Nehru’s democratic opponents more — like, for instance, C. Rajagopalachari and Jayaprakash Narayan. And yet he was drawn to Nehru’s intellect and to his politics sufficiently to go beyond the call of diplomatic duty to analyse Nehru’s impact on his times, with disinterested interest."

Crocker himself wrote in his introduction that "had my job in Delhi been anything else I would still have watched him, out of interest, almost helpless interest. He was interesting because of his political importance but still more interesting because of himself. Mostly I admired him; occasionally he was disappointing; but always he fascinated me".

== View of Nehru ==
Ramachandra Guha, who calls the book "the best single-volume study" of Nehru, with "arguments and conclusions [that] speak directly to the present", wrote in 2006 that in his opinion the following excerpts taken from Crocker's book provide for the best summing up of Nehru as an individual and as a leader:

His first concern was to see that India did not fall apart. To this end he encouraged a nationalism that would make Indians feel that they were Indians instead of feeling that they were Tamils or Punjabis or Dogras or Assamese or Brahmans or Kshatriyas or this or that caste, as they are apt. He gave special consideration to the Muslims as to induce them to feel Indian. For the same reason Christians and other minorities could always be sure of Nehru's unflinching protection. The "Secular State", that is to say a non-Hindu and all-Indian State, was fundamental to this concern.The great bulk of the people of India sensed, and they never lost the sense, that Nehru only wanted to help them and wanted nothing for himself; and that he was a ruler who had pity and kindness....Nehru had conflicts with other [Indian] leaders, such as Rajagopalachari, Rajendra Prasad and Patel, over Socialism; with Subas Chandra Bose over the Fascist approach; and with Jinnah over the status of the Muslims. Nehru's contests were always over ideas, never over any personal interests of his own, although he waged them without quarter and provoked a good deal of personal enmity. Nehru might have been ignorant or misguided about some matters, and about some persons, but he was always disinterested, always concerned with what he thought would help Indians or mankind. We can be certain that there will be no revelations to make about him of the kind which are often made about celebrities; not even revelations like those of Churchill's disagreeableness. Nehru's private face differed scarcely at all from his public face.

== Difference between 1966 and 2009 versions of the book ==
The 2009 reprint removed Toynbee's foreword and an introductory chapter on Indian society and history and added annotations to contextualize material for modern readers that would likely have been familiar to the original audience of Crocker's book.

== Books ==
- Nehru:A Contemporary's Estimate by Walter Crocker with a Foreword by Arnold Toynbee(1966).New York: Oxford University Press.
- Nehru: A Contemporary's Estimate by Walter Crocker with a Foreword by Ramachandra Guha(2009). Random House India.
