= 2016 Australian census =

17th Australian census

2016 Census
- 9 August 2016; 10 years ago

General information
- Country: Australia
- Authority: Australian Bureau of Statistics
- Website: abs.gov.au (2016)

Results
- Total population: 23,401,892 (▲8.8%)
- Most populous state/territory: New South Wales (7,480,228)
- Least populous state/territory: Jervis Bay (391)

The 2016 Australian census was the 17th national population census held in Australia. The census was officially conducted with effect on Tuesday, 9 August 2016. The total population of the Commonwealth of Australia was counted as 23,401,892 – an increase of 8.8 per cent or 1,894,175 people over the 2011 census. Norfolk Island joined the census for the first time in 2016, adding 1,748 to the population.

The ABS annual report revealed that $24 million in additional expenses accrued due to the outage on the census website.

Results from the 2016 census were available to the public on 11 April 2017, from the Australian Bureau of Statistics website, two months earlier than for any previous census. The second release of data occurred on 27 June 2017 and a third data release was from 17 October 2017. Australia's next census took place in 2021.

== Scope ==
The Australian Bureau of Statistics (ABS) states the aim of the 2016 Australian census is "to count every person who spent Census night, 9 August 2016, in Australia".

The census covers every Australian state and mainland territory, as well as the external territories of Christmas Island, Cocos (Keeling) Islands, and Norfolk Island. It does not include the other external territories of Australia. People who leave Australia but do not go through migration formalities are included, counted as part of an "Off-Shore Statistical Areas Level 1" in Tasmania. This includes those on oil and gas rigs near Australia and those at the Australian bases of the Australian Antarctic Territory. Visitors to Australia are included, regardless of how long they are staying for, however those who have been in the country less than a year answer fewer questions on the census. People who enter Australia but do not go through migration formalities are excluded. This includes those on ships in Australian waters that remain on the ship at port. Foreign diplomats and their families or those who travel on a diplomatic passport are excluded, as per the Vienna Convention on Diplomatic Relations. Those on vessels between Australian ports, or planes between Australian airports are included.

All private dwellings are counted. Caravans in caravan parks and manufactured homes in manufactured home estates are counted if they are occupied. Non-private dwellings are included if they are occupied. This includes hotels, hospitals and prisons. Non occupied residences of owners, managers or caretakers are included and unoccupied, self contained residences in retirement villages are included.

== Collection methods ==
The 2016 census had a response rate of 95.1% and a net undercount of 1.0%, with 63% of people completing the Census online.

In the period leading up to census date the Australian Government decided that the retention period for names and addresses would be increased to up to four years, from 18 months in the 2006 and 2011 censuses, leading to concerns about privacy and data security. As such, some Australian Senate crossbenchers (from the Greens, Nick Xenophon Team and Jacqui Lambie Network) said they would not complete those specific sections of the census, despite the fines associated with incorrect completion of the census.

According to the Australian Bureau of Statistics the first release of census data became available to the public on the ABS website on 11 April 2017, two months earlier than for any previous census. The second release of data occurred on 27 June 2017 and a third data release was from 17 October 2017.

=== Online ===
ABS website message after the 2016 online census was shut down

For the first time, the ABS significantly favoured internet submission of census forms over the traditional paper forms, claiming it expected more than 65% of Australians would complete the census online. Reflecting this new preference, the tagline of the ad campaign for the census was the rhyming slogan "Get online on August 9". Across many regions, paper forms were no longer delivered by default to homes, and households that wished to complete a paper census had to order such forms via an automated hotline. Letters were sent to each dwelling with unique code numbers that people would need to either login to the census website, or order a paper form if they preferred. By census night, many households had still not received such a letter. Contrary to previous years where censuses were both delivered and retrieved from households by dedicated census employees, in 2016 most of the paperwork relating to the census was delivered from and to the ABS by Australia Post.

The 2016 census was met by a significant controversy, which meant that many Australians could not complete the census online on the designated census day. The ABS census website shut down at about 7:30 pm AEST on the night the census was to be completed. According to the ABS, throughout 9 August the census website received four denial-of-service attacks. At 7:30 pm, when the site was being heavily used, a software failure meant that the ABS was unable to keep blocking the denial-of-service attacks, leading to the failure of a router. As a result, the ABS decided to close down the system as a precaution. The 15th Chief Statistician, David Kalisch stated that no census data were compromised. The Australian Signals Directorate assisted the ABS to bring the infrastructure back online more than 24 hours after the closure. The census website was restored at 2:30 pm on 11 August.

On the same day Australian Prime Minister Malcolm Turnbull stated his unhappiness over the event, which had "been a failure of the ABS", with his expectation that "heads will roll" once a review was complete. Leader of the opposition Bill Shorten said that the 2016 census had been the "worst-run ... in the history of Australia". The ABS blamed service provider IBM for the failure in the online census, saying that IBM had advised on the preparedness and resilience to DDoS attacks and had not offered any further protections that could be employed. On 31 August, Parliament initiated an inquiry into the 2016 census. It released its findings on 24 November and found that no individual party was responsible but it was shared between the government, IBM, and the sub-contractors. Prime Minister Malcolm Turnbull has confirmed that IBM made a "very substantial financial settlement" with the Commonwealth as compensation for the failure of the 2016 online Census.

The census forms were able to be submitted online until 23 September. Once collection was complete, the ABS issued an announcement which confirmed that in spite of the initial online problems, there was a preliminary response rate of more than 96%. This consisted of 4.9 million (over 58%) online submissions and 3.5 million paper forms. The preliminary response rate was similar to the previous two census response rates of 95.8% in 2006 and 96.5% in 2011.

An independent panel established by the Australian Statistician to quality assure the data from the 2016 census found it was fit for purpose, comparable to previous Australian and international censuses and can be used with confidence.

The Independent Assurance Panel I established to provide extra assurance and transparency of Census data quality concluded that the 2016 Census data can be used with confidence.

— David Kalisch, Chief Statistician.

== Census questions ==
The Census form had 51 questions relating to the characteristics of individuals, plus an extra nine questions relating to households. Of the sixty questions, the following two questions were optional:

- What is the person's religion?
- Does each person agree to his/her name and address and other information on this form being kept by the National Archives of Australia and then made publicly available after 99 years?

== Population and dwellings ==
The population counts for Australian states and territories were that New South Wales remains the most populous state, with 7,480,228 people counted, ahead of Victoria (5,926,624) and Queensland (4,703,193). Australian Capital Territory (ACT) experienced the largest population growth of any state or territory over the past five years, with an increase of 11.2% while Tasmania had the smallest growth at 3.0% since the last census in 2011. Persons count based on place of usual residence on Census night.

States and territories		Male	Female	Total	% change
Flag of New South Wales	New South Wales	3,686,014	3,794,217	7,480,228	▲8.1%
Flag of Victoria (state)	Victoria	2,908,077	3,018,549	5,926,624	▲10.7%
Flag of Queensland	Queensland	2,321,889	2,381,308	4,703,193	▲8.6%
Flag of Western Australia	Western Australia	1,238,419	1,235,994	2,474,410	▲10.5%
Flag of South Australia	South Australia	825,997	850,652	1,676,653	▲5.0%
Flag of Tasmania	Tasmania	249,478	260,482	509,965	▲3.0%
Flag of Australian Capital Territory	Australian Capital Territory	195,739	201,653	397,397	▲11.2%
Flag of Northern Territory	Northern Territory	118,570	110,266	228,833	▲8.0%
External Territories					
Flag of Christmas Island	Christmas Island	1,130	712	1,843	▼
Flag of Norfolk Island	Norfolk Island	819	930	1,748	▼
Flag of the Cocos (Keeling) Islands	Cocos (Keeling) Islands	268	273	544	▼
Flag of Jervis Bay Territory	Jervis Bay Territory	216	172	391	▲
Commonwealth of Australia		11,546,638	11,855,248	23,401,892	▲8.8%
Source: External territories

=== "Other Territories" ===
The inclusion of Norfolk Island in Other Territories was new for 2016, following an amendment to the Acts Interpretation Act, 1901. In the 2016 Census, there were 1,748 people, compared with a population of 1,796 in 2011 (Norfolk Island Government Census). Of these 46.8% were male and 53.2% were female. The enumeration of Norfolk Island was an area of special attention for the ABS.

=== Age ===
Age	2016 Census	
Age	Number	Percentage
Median age	38	–
0–4 years	1,464,779	6.3%
5–9 years	1,502,646	6.4%
10–14 years	1,397,183	6.0%
15–19 years	1,421,595	6.1%
20–24 years	1,566,793	6.7%
25–29 years	1,664,602	7.1%
30–34 years	1,703,847	7.3%
35–39 years	1,561,679	6.7%
40–44 years	1,583,257	6.8%
45–49 years	1,581,455	6.8%
50–54 years	1,523,551	6.5%
55–59 years	1,454,332	6.2%
60–64 years	1,299,397	5.6%
65–69 years	1,188,999	5.1%
70–74 years	887,716	3.8%
75–79 years	652,657	2.8%
80–84 years	460,549	2.0%
85 years and over	486,842	2.1%
Source: Australian Bureau of Statistics

== Country of birth ==
Of all residents over two-thirds (66.7% or 15,614,835) were born in Australia. Over a quarter of the population (26.3% or 6,163,667 persons) said they were born overseas, plus 1.6 million did not state any response. The proportion of overseas-born people from Asia has increased from 33% in 2011 to 40%, while Europe has declined from 40% in 2011 to 34% in 2016.

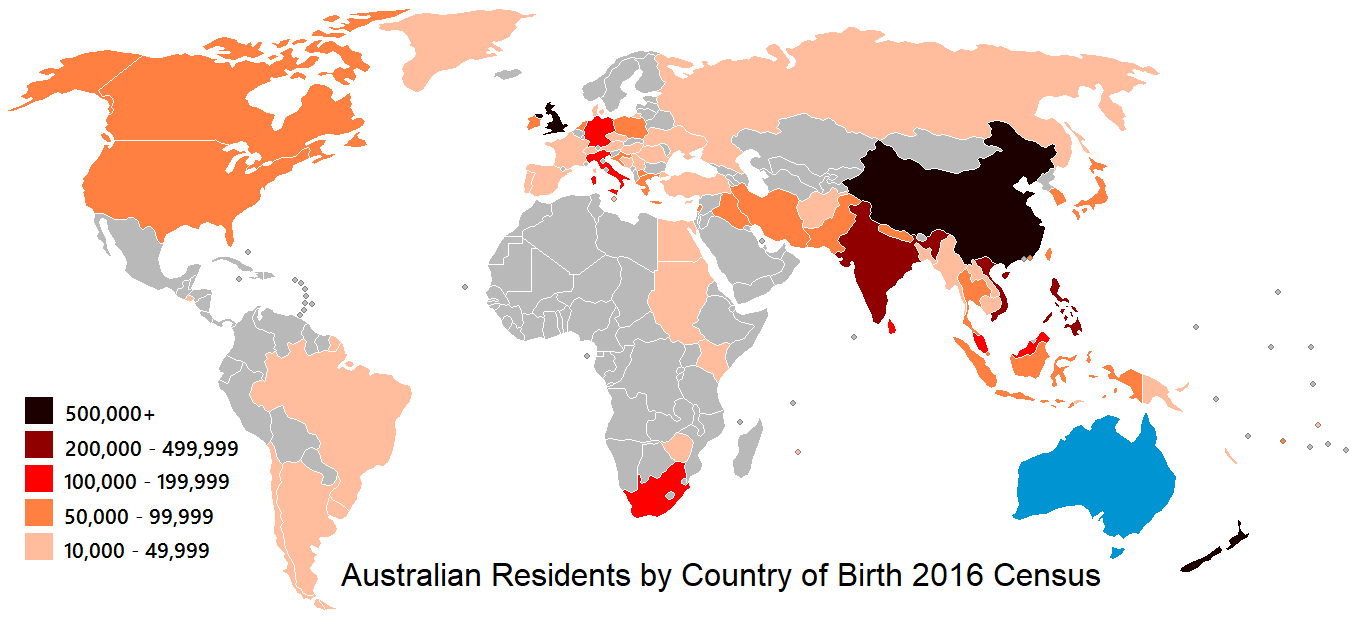
Country of birth of Australian residents at 2016 census

However, England (907,572 or 3.9% of Australia's population) remains the most common country of birth, followed by New Zealand (518,466 or 2.2%). It was question 12 on the 2016 Census Household Paper Form.

Proportion of overseas-born population.
1. England (14.7%)
2. New Zealand (8.40%)
3. China (8.30%)
4. India (7.40%)
5. Philippines (3.80%)
6. Vietnam (3.60%)
7. Italy (2.80%)
8. South Africa (2.60%)
9. Malaysia (2.20%)
10. Scotland (1.90%)
11. Others (44.3%)

Country of Birth		Population	Percent of population	Ref(s)
(Australia)	Australia	15,614,835	66.7%	
New South Wales		4,899,090	65.5%	
Victoria		3,845,493	64.9%	
Queensland		3,343,657	71.1%	
South Australia		1,192,546	71.1%	
Western Australia		1,492,842	60.3%	
Tasmania		411,490	80.7%	
Northern Territory		157,531	68.8%	
Australian Capital Territory		269,682	68.0%	
Total, Overseas-born		6,163,667	26.3%	
Oceania				
(New Zealand)	New Zealand	518,462	2.2%	
Europe				
(England)	England	907,572	3.9%	
(Scotland)	Scotland	119,420	0.4%	
(Wales)	Wales	28,047	0.1%	
	Northern Ireland	23,025	0.1%	
(Italy)	Italy	174,044	0.7%	
(Germany)	Germany	102,595	0.4%	
(Greece)	Greece	93,745	0.4%	
(Republic of Ireland)	Republic of Ireland	74,895	0.4%	
(Netherlands)	Netherlands	70,174	0.3%	
(Poland)	Poland	45,365	0.2%	
(Croatia)	Croatia	43,681	0.2%	
(France)	France	31,124	0.1%	
(Portugal)	Portugal	15,809	0.1%	
(Spain)	Spain	15,396	0.1%	
Other European Countries			–	
Asia				
(China)	China (Note: (excluding Special administrative regions of China (SARs) and Taiwan).)	509,557	2.2%	
(India)	India	455,388	1.9%	
(Philippines)	Philippines	232,384	1.0%	
(Vietnam)	Vietnam	219,357	0.9%	
(Malaysia)	Malaysia	138,365	–	
(Sri Lanka)	Sri Lanka	109,853		
(South Korea)	South Korea	98,775	0.4%	
(Hong Kong)	Hong Kong	86,888	-	
(Lebanon)	Lebanon	78,651	-	
(Indonesia)	Indonesia	73,217	–	
(Iraq)	Iraq	67,355	–	
(Thailand)	Thailand	66,231	–	
(Pakistan)	Pakistan	61,915	–	
(Iran)	Iran	58,106	–	
Africa				
(South Africa)	South Africa	162,448	0.7%	
America		–	–	
(United States)	United States	86,133	0.4%	
(Canada)	Canada	43,049	–	
Polynesia		–	–	
(Fiji)	Fiji	61,473	–	
Not stated		1,636,000	7.0%	
Totals, Australia		23,401,892	100.0%	–
Source: Bureau of Statistics

== Culture, ancestry and language ==
=== Ancestry ===
The highest reported ancestries in Australia and for the external territory of Norfolk Island as a percentage of population. Results of the ABS Census of Population and Housing, 2016 are as follows.

Ancestry	Number	Percent
English	7,852,224	36.1
Australian (Note: The Australian Bureau of Statistics has stated that most who nominate "Australian" as their ancestry have at least partial Anglo-Celtic ancestry.)	7,298,243	33.5
Irish	2,388,058	11.0
Scottish	2,023,470	9.3
Chinese	1,213,903	5.6
Australian Bureau of Statistics

=== External territories ===
Norfolk Island
Ancestry	Number	Percentage
Australian	553	22.8%
English	543	22.4%
Pitcairn	484	20.0%
Scottish	145	6.0%
Irish	125	5.2%

Australian Aboriginals and Torres Strait Islanders

There were 649,171 Indigenous Australians, who made up 2.8% of Australia's population.

== Religion ==
Religious affiliation	2016 census			
Religious affiliation	Number		Percentage	
Christian	▼	12,201,600	▼	52.1%
Anglican	▼	3,101,191	▼	13.3%
Baptist	▲	345,142	▲	1.5%
Catholic (Roman)	▲	5,291,830	▲	22.6%
Christianity (defined and not defined)	▲	768,649	▲	6.3%
Eastern Orthodox, Oriental Orthodoxy, and Assyrian Apostolic	▲	567,680	▲	2.1%
Jehovah's Witnesses	▼	82,510	▼	0.4%
Latter-day Saints	▲	61,639	▲	0.3%
Lutheran	▼	174,019	▼	0.7%
Pentecostal	▲	260,560	▲	1.1%
Presbyterian and Reformed	▼	524,338	▼	2.3%
Salvation Army	▼	48,939	▼	0.2%
Seventh-day Adventist	▲	62,945	▲	0.3%
Uniting Church in Australia	▼	870,183	▼	3.7%
Non-Christian		1,464,162		6.3%
Buddhism		563,674		2.4%
Hinduism		440,330		1.9%
Islam		604,420		2.6%
Judaism		91,022		0.4%
Sikhism		125,901		0.5%
No Religion	▲	7,040,717	▲	30.1%
Not stated or unclear	▲	2,238,735	▲	9.6%
Australia	▲	23,401,892	Steady	100%
Source: Australian Bureau of Statistics.

=== Language ===
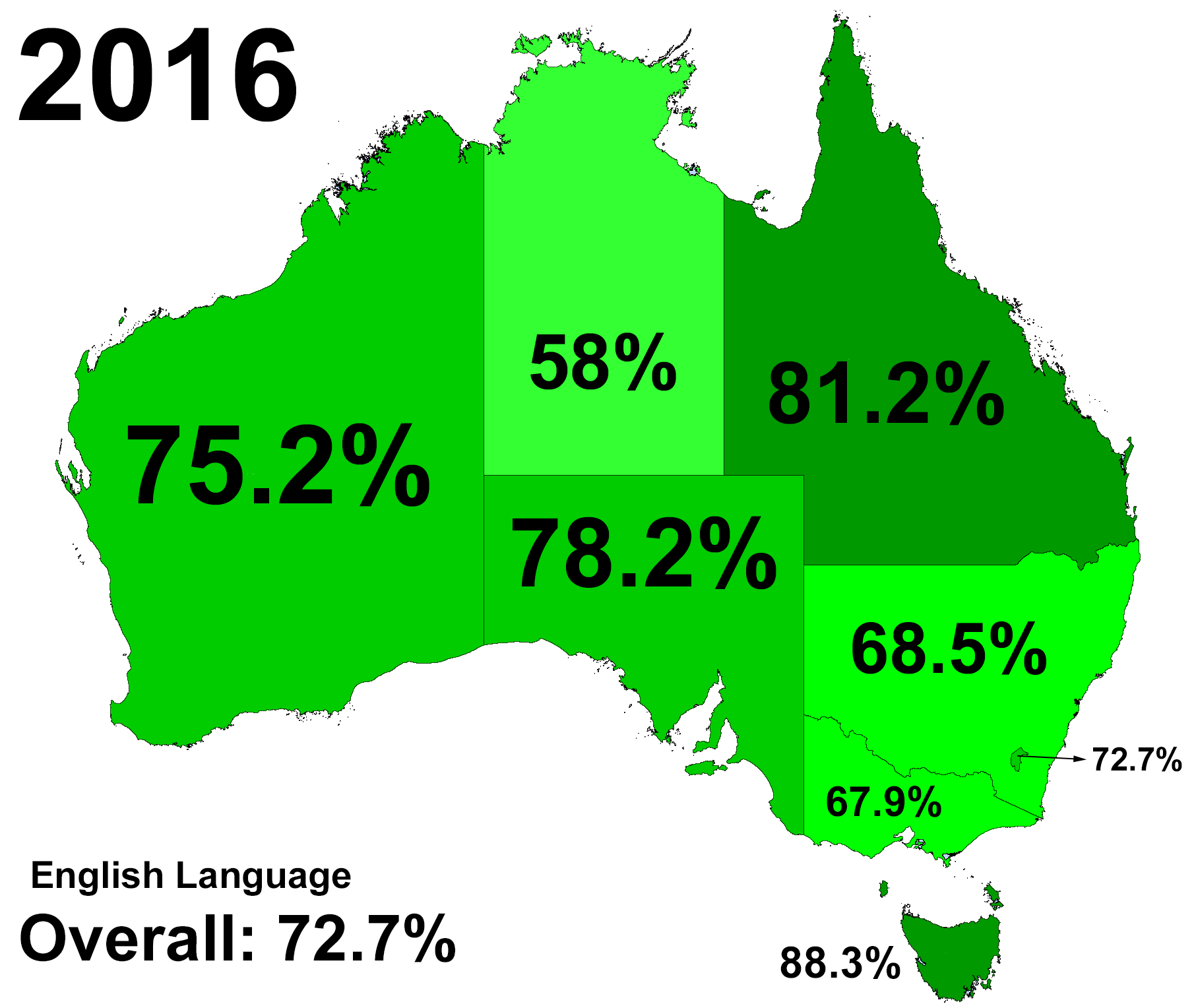
Percentage of people who speak the English language at home in 2016

- 72.7% spoke only English at home.
- 22.2% spoke a language other than English at home. The most common of these were:
  - Mandarin
  - Arabic
  - Cantonese
  - Vietnamese
  - Italian
- 2% of the population could not speak English at all.

== Homelessness ==
The number of homeless people in Australia jumped by more than 14,000 – or 14 per cent – in the five years to 2016, according to census data. The Australian Bureau of Statistics (ABS) said 116,000 people were homeless on census night in 2016, representing 50 homeless people per 10,000. The majority of homeless people in Australia were male. In addition, Indigenous Australians and recent migrants were over-represented among the homeless.

== Gender ==
The 2016 census was the first to offer an option other than "male" or "female", however, this option was only available on a special version of the online form. Some trans people criticised the difficulty in accessing this alternative form. The online nature of the census also prevented transmasculine people who checked the "male" box from answering questions about pregnancy and having children, as it would automatically skip those questions.

== See also ==
- 2016 in Australia
- 1911 Australian census
- 1966 Australian census
- Census in Australia
