= Nicholas Gruen =

Australian economist

Nicholas Gruen (born 1957) is an Australian economist and commentator on economic reform, innovation and the CEO of Lateral Economics. He is a visiting professor at King's College London's Policy Institute. He was formerly chair of the Australian Centre for Social Innovation, the Australian Government's Innovation Australia and Kaggle. Former Australian Finance Minister Lindsay Tanner called him "Australia's foremost public intellectual" while Martin Wolf described him as "an absolutely brilliant economist … the most brilliant economist you've never heard of".

== Education ==
Gruen graduated from the University of Melbourne Law School and has a Bachelor of Arts with first class honours in history from the Australian National University. He has a PhD from the Australian National University.

== Career ==
Gruen worked as adviser to Senator and Federal Industry Minister John Button from the early 1980s and was regarded as the architect of the Button car plan, which freed up automotive trade, eliminated quotas, reduced tariffs and assisted exports during the transition. From 1990 to 1993 he was economic adviser to Treasurer John Dawkins. He was appointed to the Productivity Commission on which he served until the late 1990s when he joined the Business Council of Australia directing its New Directions project. In 2000 he founded economic consultancy Lateral Economics and a discount finance broker Peach Home Loans. In this period he has advised Federal and State Governments both as a consultant and when appointed as member or chair of various official committees. He was a member of the Council of the National Library of Australia. In 2011 he was appointed to the board of Innovation Australia and was subsequently appointed as its chair. He also chaired the Open Knowledge Foundation (Australia).

Gruen has become prominent in public economic discussion. He had a regular economic column for the Courier Mail and later wrote regularly for the Australian Financial Review. He contributes regularly to the popular group blog Club Troppo and has a weekly substack.

He built the Herald/Age Lateral Economics (HALE) Index of Wellbeing, which augments official national income measures to take account of the implications of changes in inequality, human capital, natural capital, and major health issues such as life expectancy, mental illness, and obesity.

He has mounted the public case for various reforms including

- Gruen has advocated for Citizens' assemblies to help fix democracy.
- Advocated that governments invest in low-cost, high-value digital public goods like open source software, Wikipedia and public media
- Advocated focusing on metrics around employee morale as a better metric that also boost productivity.
- Argued that governments should focus more taxation on 'bads' (externalities) like pollution and congestion.
- Gruen also submitted a report on January 1, 2025 to the government on a proposed stadium in Tasmania arguing that the costs to the public had been significantly underestimated, while the benefits significantly overestimated.
- refashioning government fiscal institutions in the image of monetary policy to inject greater independence and flexibility into government capital expenditure and fiscal policy as a macro-economic instrument.
- allowing people to access their superannuation savings (pension plan) to help raise a house deposit.
- improving information flows in a range of markets such as labour markets (on relative safety and job quality) and markets for professional services (on service quality and likely outcomes).
- building digital public private partnerships to enable services such as 23andMe to be provided as free public goods rather than private goods by subscription and for the resulting data to be maximally open (subject to opting in and privacy constraints).
- giving citizens and business presumptive access to government provided services on competitive neutrality grounds. This would apply to the wealth management governments provide for their public servants and citizens would be able to bank with the central bank to level the playing field between them and commercial banks and to capture substantial seigniorage revenue for government. This policy was taken to the 2019 election by the Greens.
- building evidence-based policy and programs with an Evaluator General providing independent evaluation of government programs. This policy was taken to the 2019 election by the Australian Labor Party.
- In 2014 Gruen suggested a radical bank reform that would solve a range of problems. According to Gruen, ordinary people should be able to use central banks' services as commercial banks can. For big commercial banks get high margins or fees but don't add much value to those services. Due to the internet, the Bank of England, for instance, could easily extend its services to everyone in the UK. For one thing it should offer deposit and savings account to all.

More recently he's written of the way government initiatives focus on things they aspire to do, without focusing on what matters — which is learning how to do them. These observations apply in areas like 'resilience', 'social inclusion' and 'wellbeing' each being a deus ex machina, or fad diet taken up by government hoping it will save it from itself. Each comes and goes, like the themes of an annual ball, building little before the next fad diet is taken up.

Gruen was a member of the Federal Government's Review of the Australian Innovation System in 2008 and chaired the Government 2.0 Taskforce for the Australian Government. The Government subsequently accepted all of the major recommendations of the Taskforce.

Gruen was also the first investor in Kaggle (a Melbourne-based data analytics company founded in 2010) serving as its first chairman. He was an early investor in HealthKit and its first chairman and has invested in a range of other Australian and international start-ups.

A recent venture has been the release of The Shared Centre: Awakening our Better Angels, a video series detailing our institutional decline and how we can address it by what Gruen calls "representation by sampling" and "bottom-up meritocracy". Featuring original music by Brian Eno, the videos seek to "bring a book-sized vision to life through 20 bite-sized explainer videos".

== Family ==
Gruen is the son of Australian economist Fred Gruen and the brother of former Federal Treasury official and current Australian Statistician David Gruen.
