= David Kalisch (economist) =

Australian economist and public servant

David Kalisch FASSA
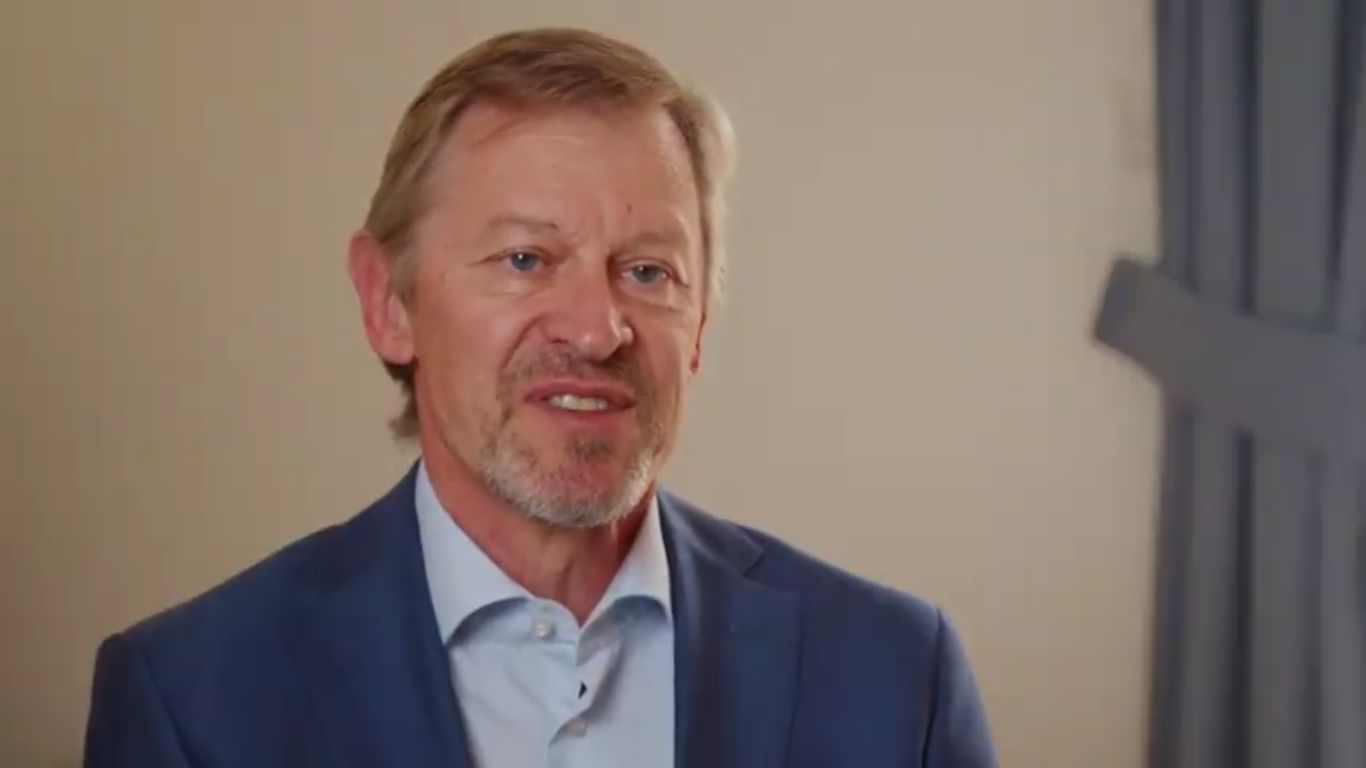
- in 2021 in an Academy of the Social Sciences in Australia video

15th Australian Statistician
- In office 15 December 2014 – 10 December 2019
- Preceded by: Brian Pink
- Succeeded by: David Gruen

Personal details
- Born: David Wayne Kalisch; 9 August 1960 (age 66) Adelaide, South Australia
- Education: University of Adelaide
- Occupation: Consultant
- Profession: Economist

David Wayne Kalisch FASSA (born 9 August 1960) is an Australian economist and public servant. From 2014 to 2019, he was the Australian Statistician in charge of the Australian Bureau of Statistics (ABS).

== Early life and education ==
Kalisch was born in Adelaide, South Australia, and was educated at Brighton High School before studying for a Bachelor of Economics degree at the University of Adelaide.

== Public service ==
Kalisch joined the Australian Public Service in 1982, holding various positions including senior executive roles from 1991. In 2006, he was appointed Deputy Secretary of the Department of Health and Ageing. From 2009 to 2010, he served as a commissioner on the Productivity Commission. In 2010, he was appointed as chief executive officer of the Australian Institute of Health and Welfare, a statutory agency responsible for gathering statistics on health and welfare in Australia. Following his term as Australian Statistician, Kalisch continues to contribute to public service as a consultant undertaking a range of work for public service agencies.

=== Australian statistician ===
In December 2014, Kalisch was appointed as the Australian Statistician, the senior bureaucrat in charge of the national statistics agency, the Australian Bureau of Statistics. The position had been vacant for nearly a year when Kalisch's appointment was confirmed by Treasurer Joe Hockey.

In February 2015, Kalisch spoke to The Australian newspaper, where he stated that the ABS needed more funding to upgrade its computer systems and software. While lobbying the federal government for the funds, he also outlined the possibility of charging businesses for statistical data, and developing data linkages between the census or social statistical surveys, and government data such as benefits, Medicare and taxation records. In December 2015, the ABS announced it would be retaining names and addresses from the census indefinitely "for the purpose of richer and more-dynamic statistics". Former Australian Statistician Bill McLennan called the decision "the most significant invasion of privacy ever perpetrated on Australians by the ABS", and questioned the legality of enforcing name collection. Kalisch wrote an opinion column in Fairfax newspapers, saying he had made the decision to enable the ABS to produce better statistics on economic and social outcomes.

Kalisch led the ABS' efforts to improve its gender diversity, almost doubling the number of female senior leaders in a few months and became a Male Champion of Change (to support gender equality) in 2016.

On the night of the census, 9 August 2016, the census website was taken down and was not restored for nearly two days. Kalisch apologised on behalf of the Bureau for the outage, stating that the site had been subject to a "malicious" denial-of-service attack and had been taken down to prevent exfiltration of census data. Later investigations revealed a misconfigured Internet router that had not been tested was the underlying cause, and that no data had been stolen. IBM paid significant compensation for its role in the outage

As Australian Statistician, on 15 November 2017 Kalisch announced the result of the Australian Marriage Law Postal Survey which had been conducted by the ABS. The innovative approach taken including learnings from the 2016 Census lead the ABS to win the 2018 IPAA ACT Citizen-Centred Innovation Award and be named a finalist in the Prime Minister's Excellence awards for the Postal Survey.

At the end of his term on Thursday 28 November IPAA ACT hosted an event where Kalisch delivered a keynote presentation called Leadership Learnings from the ABS: The Lows, The Highs and Everything in Between.

Kalisch was elected Fellow of the Academy of the Social Sciences in Australia in November 2021 together with 36 others including the medical historian Catharine Coleborne, Nisvan Erkal, the linguist I Wayan Arka, and the anthropologist Lyn Parker.

Government offices
Preceded by Brian Pink	Australian Statistician; 2014–2019	Succeeded by David Gruen
