= Philippidis =

Philippidis or Filippidis (Greek: Φιλιππίδης) is a Greek surname. The female version of the name is Philippidou or Filippidou. Philippidis is a patronymic surname which literally means "the son of Philippos (Filippos)". Notable examples include:

== Men ==
- Daniel Philippidis (c.1750–1832), scholar, figure of the modern Greek Enlightenment
- George Philippidis, Greek American cleantech leader (renewable fuels and power)
- Konstadinos Filippidis, Greek pole vaulter
- Petros Filipidis, Greek actor and director
- George Apostolos Filippides, Greek/American Chairman, President & CEO (High-Tech & Green Energy Executive)

== Women ==
- Sophia Philippidou, Greek actress

== See also ==
For more information about the history of the name, see Philippides.
