= Dennis Trewin =

Australian statistician

Dennis Trewin AO
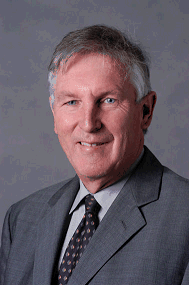

13th [[Australian Statistician]]
- In office July 2000 – January 2007
- Preceded by: Bill McLennan
- Succeeded by: Brian Pink

Personal details
- Born: Dennis John Trewin Melbourne, Victoria, Australia
- Education: University of Melbourne; Australian National University; London School of Economics
- Occupation: Public Servant
- Profession: Statistician

Dennis John Trewin AO FASSA is an Australian former public servant, who was the Australian Statistician, the head of the Australian Bureau of Statistics, between July 2000 and January 2007.

Trewin joined the ABS in 1966 as a statistics cadet. Between 1992 and 1995 he was the Deputy Government Statistician in Statistics New Zealand and a Deputy Australian Statistician from 1995 to 2000, when he was appointed as the Australian Statistician.

Trewin was the driving force behind the ABS's pioneering 'Measures of Australia's Progress' (MAP), a new system of integrated national progress measurement, linking economic, social, environmental and governance dimensions of progress, a project which gained wide respect among other national statistical offices and helped bring about the OECD's global project, 'Measuring the Progress of Societies'.

He held other senior appointments in Australia such as non-judicial member of the Australian Electoral Commission, a director of the Australian Institute for Health and Welfare, a Commissioner for an Inquiry into the Not-for-Profit sector for the Productivity Commission, a Council member of the University of Canberra, a trustee and board member for ARIA (the superannuation funds for Commonwealth Government employees, Chair of the Australian Mathematics Trust and an adjunct professor at Swinburne University and the University of Canberra. He has held the office of president of the Statistical Society of Australia. He was elected a Life Member.

Internationally, in 2003 he completed a term as president of the International Statistical Institute having previously been vice-president and president of the International Association of Survey Statisticians. He is a past editor of the International Statistical Review.

He was chairman of the global executive board at the World Bank, chairman of the Asia/Pacific Committee of Statistics, and chairman of the advisory board of Swinburne University of Technology's Swinburne Institute for Social Research.

Trewin holds honorary life memberships of the International Statistical Institute and the Statistical Society of Australia. He was listed as one of Australia's Smart 100 in a 2003 poll run by the Australian magazine The Bulletin. He received an Honorary Doctorate from James Cook University in 2015.

He was elected as a Fellow of the Academy of Social Sciences and was chair of its Policy and Advocacy Committee. In 2007, he was appointed an Officer of the Order of Australia (AO) and received a Centenary Medal in Recognition of his services to Australian and international statistics. He was elected to the Alumni Hall of Fame at the ANU School of Economics and Finance.

== References and further reading ==
- Trewin, Dennis (2012), "Chapter 5: The last count—the importance of official statistics to the democratic process", in Wanna, John; Vincent, Sam; Podger, Andrew Stuart (eds.), With the benefit of hindsight: Valedictory reflections from departmental secretaries, 2004–11 (PDF), Canberra, Australia: Australian National University, pp. 43–49, ISBN 9781921862731, archived from the original (PDF) on 5 February 2014

Government offices
Preceded by Bill McLennan	Australian Statistician; 2000–2007	Succeeded by Brian Pink
