= Constant elasticity of transformation =

Constant Elasticity of Transformation (CET) was first advanced by Alan Powell and Fred Gruen in a 1968 publication. It is a new form of production-possibility frontier. Following on that early work, George Philippidis made a detailed introduction of the CET function in 1999. The CET is the corollary CES function, where the production possibilities of the firm (industry) are a function of different combination of supply activities.
