= 1911 Australian census =

First Australian national population census

First commonwealth census
- 3 April 1911; 115 years ago

General information
- Country: Commonwealth of Australia
- Authority: Bureau of Census and Statistics
- Website: abs.gov.au (1911)

Results
- Total population: 4,455,005 (▲18.05%)
- Most populous state or territory: New South Wales (1,646,734)
- Least populous state or territory: Federal Territory (1,714)

The 1911 Australian census was the first national population census held in Australia and was conducted by the Bureau of Census and Statistics. The day used for the census, was taken for the night between 2 and 3 April 1911. The total population of the Commonwealth of Australia was counted as 4,455,005 – an increase of 681,204 people, 18.05% over the 1901 "Federation" census. (Note: (Excluding the Dwellings occupied solely by Full-blooded Aboriginals).)

The Census Volumes II and III were published on 30 September 1914. At that time it was intended to issue shortly thereafter Volume 1.

== Collection method ==
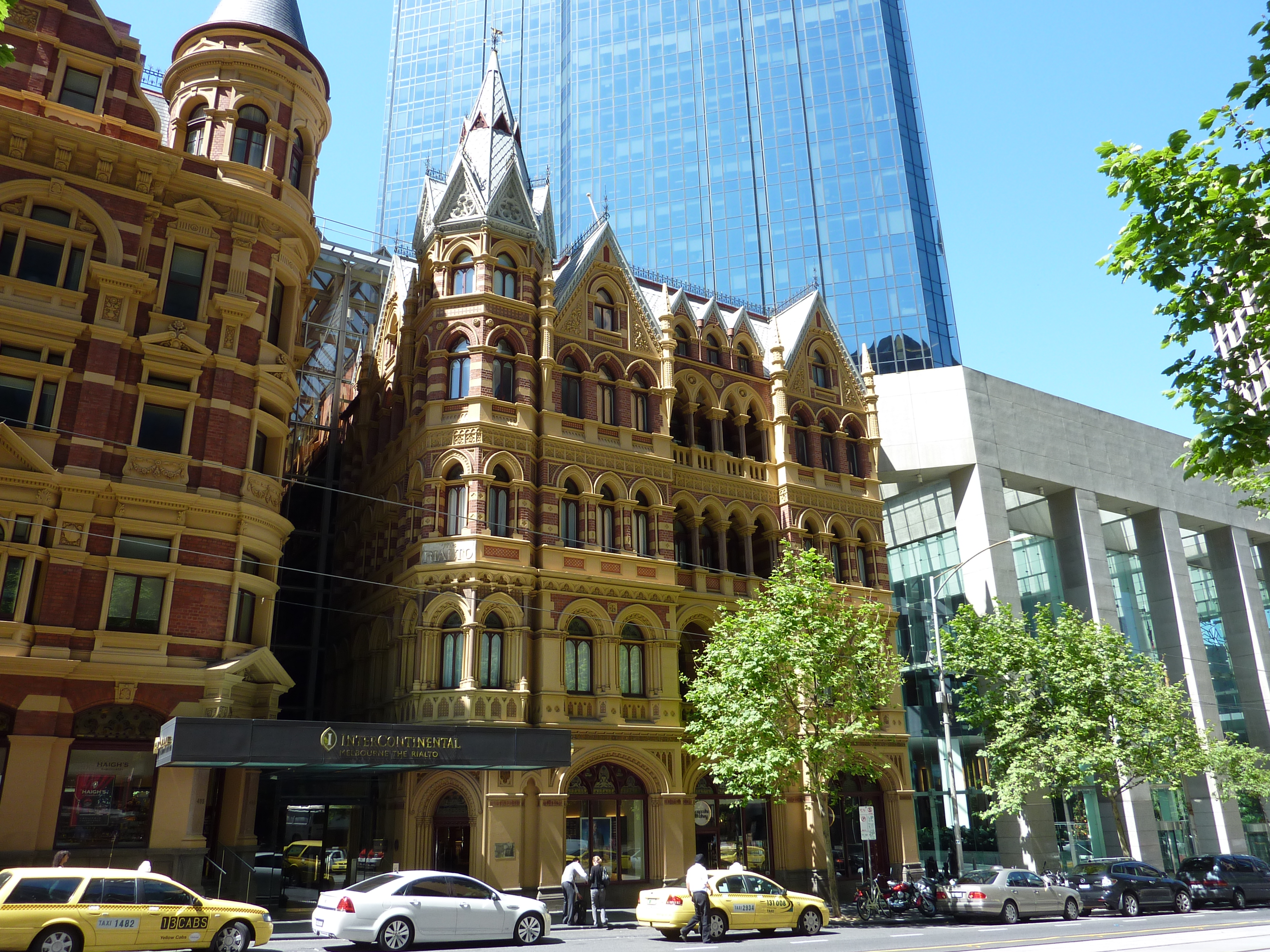
The Rialto building, 497–503 Collins Street, where Knibbs and staff occupied during the census.

The first Commonwealth Statistician was George Handley Knibbs. He began his career as a licensed surveyor in government service. On Monday 3 April 1911, census collectors set out all over Australia under mostly clear skies to begin gathering in Australia's first national census forms. They covered suburbs to rural towns and the outback. They travelled by bike or horse where they had the transport that was needed to cover large areas, however, most travelled by foot. Some in Northern Queensland had to find their way through a flooded landscape while others in South Australia had difficulties finding water and fodder for their horses due to droughts. They had distributed the forms prior to the census day.

There was a permanent staff of the 'Bureau of Census and Statistics' which consisted of the Statistician (Knibbs) and many assistants, some young men working as clerks as well as a couple of messenger boys. A female typist had joined soon after. The bureau was located in the old Rialto Building in Collins Street, Melbourne which at that time the temporary seat of federal government, by 1928, the bureau relocated to Canberra.

Collectors had to supply their own transport and cover any associated costs such as fodder and petrol. They were paid according to their method of transport. Collectors on foot were paid ten shilling a day, those on bicycle fifteens shillings a day and those on horse 20 shillings a day. Police were used in the days immediately following the census to get travellers, swagmen and campers to provide their information. Train conductors and ships' captains were also used as collectors in the 1911 census and several subsequent censuses, to cover people travelling overnight on census night.

== Census questions ==
"For Every Person present in the Night from 2 to 3 April 1911, or returning on 3rd April (if not included elsewhere).
1. Name in full (Underline Surname.)
2. Sex – {Write M for Male}, {Write F for Female}
3. Date of Birth: Day, Month, Year
(a) Where exact date of birth is unknown, age at last birthday____years
4. If married, write M. If widowed, write W. If divorced, write D. If never married, write N. M.
5. Date of existing Marriage: Year...........
6. Number of Children (living and dead) from existing Marriage...........

- (a) Number of Children (living and dead) from previous Marriage............

7. Relation to Head of Household
8. State if Blind or Deaf and Dumb ..............
9. Country (or Australian State) where born
10. If a British subject by parentage. write P.

- If a British subject by Naturalization. write N.
- Race –

11. If born outside Commonwealth, state length of residence therein

  - (a) Date of Arrival in Commonwealth, Day, Month, Year, .

12. Religion

13. Education

  - (a) At present receiving Education

14. Profession or Occupation
(If engaged in more than one occupation. underline principal occupation.)

  - (a) State if Employer or Employee, &c
  - (b) If out of work, state period
  - (c) Occupation of Employer (if any).

== Population and dwellings ==
Population counts for Australian states and territories had 4,455,005 and 19,939 full-Aboriginals (counted separately) for a total population of 4,474,944.

Note: All figures are for the census usually resident population count.

States and Territories	Males	Females	Total
New South Wales	857,698	789,036	1,646,734
Victoria	655,591	659,960	1,315,551
Queensland	329,506	276,307	605,813
South Australia	207,358	201,200	408,558
Western Australia	161,565	120,549	282,114
Tasmania	97,591	93,620	191,211
Territories			
Northern Territory	2,734	576	3,310
Federal Territory	992	722	1,714
Commonwealth of Australia	2,313,035	2,141,970	4,455,005
Source: Australian Bureau of Statistics (Note: At the Census of 3 April 1911 (Full-blooded Aboriginals not included).)

=== Aboriginal population ===
States and Territories	Males	Females	Total
New South Wales	1,152	860	2,012
Victoria	103	93	196
Queensland	5,145	3,542	8,687
South Australia	802	637	1,439
Western Australia	3,433	2,936	6,369
Tasmania	2	1	3
Territories			
Northern Territory	743	480	1,223
Federal Territory	5	5	10
Commonwealth of Australia	11,385	8,554	19,939

== Birthplace ==
At the Census of 3 April 1911, each person was asked to state on a "personal" card, the "Country or Australian State where born," and to state on a "personal" card, and from the replies to this query, taken in conjunction with the other data furnished, the tables contained in Part II. Results show that those born in Europe (673,006) represent 88% of the total overseas-born population.

% of the overseas-born
1. England (50.0%)
2. Ireland (20.0%)
3. Scotland (13.0%)
4. Germany (5.00%)
5. New Zealand (5.00%)
6. China (3.00%)
7. Wales (2.00%)
8. Italy (1.00%)
9. British India (1.00%)
10. United States (0.00%)

Country of birth	Population	Percent (%)
Australia	3,667,670	82.90
New South Wales	1,315,030	–
Victoria	1,181,787	–
Queensland	415,064	–
South Australia	394,768	–
Western Australia	114,550	–
Tasmania	193,770	–
Northern Territory	710	–
Australia (undefined)	51,991	–
Australasia	3,721,052	83.52
Overseas-born	766,070	16.48
New Zealand	32,117	0.72
Europe	673,006	15.11
England	346,030	7.75
Scotland	93,083	–
Isle of Man	1,007	–
Ireland	139,434	–
Wales	12,175	–
(United Kingdom) Other European British pos.	2,378	–
Austria-Hungary	2,774	–
Belgium	339	–
Denmark	5,663	–
France	2,876	–
Germany	32,990	–
Greece	1,798	–
Italy	6,719	–
Netherlands	745	–
Norway	3,451	–
Portugal	173	–
Russia	4,456	–
Spain	658	–
Sweden	5,586	–
Switzerland	1,736	–
Other European Countries	600	–
Asia	36,822	0.83
China	20,775	–
Africa	4,995	0.11
South Africa (undefined)	2,525	–
America	11,402	0.25
United States of America	6,642	–
Canada	2,944	–
Polynesia	3,439	0.08
Fiji	852	–
At sea	4,289	0.10
Unspecified	30,470	–
Total Commonwealth	4,455,005	100.0

== Ethnic origin and religion ==
=== Race ===
At the first Australian census in 1911 only those "aboriginal natives" living near European settlements were enumerated, and the main population tables included only those of half or less Aboriginal descent. Details of those "full-blood" Aborigines enumerated were included in separate tables.

Race	Population	Percent (%)
European	4,402,662	98.83
Non-European
Aboriginals (Half)	10,113	0.23
Asiatic	38,690	0.87
Chinese	25,772	0.57
Hindus	3,698	0.08
Japanese	3,576	0.08
African	693	0.01
American	89	0.00
American Indians	51	0.00
West Indies (so described)	35	0.00
Mexicans	2	0.00
Bermudans	1	0.00
Polynesian	2,751	0.06
Polynesians (so described)	2,197	0.04
Papuans	375	0.00
Māori	134	0.00
Fijians	45	0.00
Indefinite	7	0.0
Totals Non-European	52,343	1.17
Grand Total	4,455,005	100.0
Aboriginal (Full)	19,939	NA
Total	4,474,944	100.0

Results showed 19,939 Aboriginals recorded for all of Australia in settled areas.

=== Religion ===
According to these figures it appears that of the 4,455,005 people in Australia on census day (3 April 1911) 4,274,414 were Christians, 36,785 non-Christians, 14,673 are described as indefinite, 10,016 were of no religion, 83,003 objected to state to what faith, if any, they belonged, and the remaining 36,114 were unspecified.

Religion	1911 census	
Religion	Number	Percent (%)
Christian	4,274,414	95.95
Church of England	1,710,443	38.4
Presbyterians	558,336	12.5
Methodists	547,806	12.3
Baptist	97,074	2.2
Congregational	74,046	1.6
Lutheran	72,395	1.6
Church of Christ	38,748	0.9
Salvation Army	26,665	0.6
Seventh-day Adventist	6,095	0.1
Unitarian	2,175	0.0
Protestant (undefined)	109,861	2.46
Roman Catholic	921,425	20.7
Greek Catholic	2,646	0.0
Catholic (undefined)	75,379	1.7
Others	31,320	0.7
Non-Christian	36,785	0.8
Hebrew	17,287	0.4
Confucian	5,194	0.1
Mohammedan	3,908	0.08
Buddhist	3,269	0.07
Pagan	1,447	0.0
Others	5,680	0.1
Indefinite	14,673	0.3
Freethinker	3,254	0.07
Agnostic	3,084	0.0
No Denomination	2,688	0.06
Others	5,647	0.0
No Religion	10,016	0.2
No Religion	9,251	0.2
Atheist	579	0.0
Others	186	0.0
Object to state	83,003	1.8
Unspecified	36,114	0.8
Grand total	4,455,005	100.0

== Blindness and deaf-mutism ==
The 1911 Australian Census recorded 3,112 people as blind. As the first national census, it included a specific question. In 1911 the census asked about deaf-mutism. This question was also asked in the next two censuses of 1921 and 1933. Deaf-mutism was found to be very high among 10- to 14-year-olds, with the same pattern existing in the 1921 census among 20 to 24-year-olds. The statisticians report on the 1921 census noted that it was "a reasonable assumption therefore that the abnormal number of deaf-mutes . . . was the result of the extensive epidemic of infectious diseases which occurred soon after many in those age groups were born".

=== Rubella discovery ===
Rubella was not known to be a possible contributor. During World War II, the ophthalmologist Norman McAllister Gregg began to investigate the connection between birth defects and the infection of mothers early in their pregnancy. In 1951, prompted by Gregg's work, Australian statistician Oliver Lancaster examined the census figures of 1911, 1921 and 1933. He found a peak in the level of deaf-mutism in the age cohort born in 1898 and 1899 and that this matched with a known outbreak of rubella in those years. "This was the first time in the world that the link between rubella and congenital problems with unborn children was firmly established."

== See also ==
- 1911 in Australia
- Census in Australia
- Australian Bureau of Statistics
