= Fred Gruen =

Australian economist

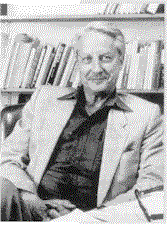
Fred Henry George Gruen

Fred Henry George Gruen AO (14 June 1921 – 29 October 1997) was an Australian economist, an early and influential voice in favour of free trade and tariff reductions in the 1960s and 1970s.

== Early life and education ==
Grün was born in Vienna, Austria, and known as 'Heinzie' during his boyhood. He left Vienna in 1936 on the £200 legacy of an uncle to receive an English education at Herne Bay College. It was a good time for someone of Jewish descent to be leaving Austria. His father Willy, a heavy smoker, died of lung cancer while he was at school in England and his mother Marianne (née Zwack) was engulfed in The Holocaust being taken first to Theresienstadt and thence to Auschwitz after which she was not seen again.

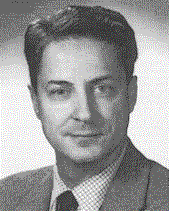
The younger Gruen

Gruen was unsure of what to do with himself after leaving high school. With consequences that would ramify at the end of his life, he worked for some time for a printer. In the same speech in which he promised to "fight on the beaches" Churchill announced widespread internment. "I know there are a great many people affected by the orders which we have made who are the passionate enemies of Nazi Germany. I am very sorry for them, but we cannot, at the present time and under the present stress, draw all the distinctions which we should like to do." Gruen was one such.

He was interned and shipped to Australia in the HMT Dunera, a boat that became famous for the talent it brought to Australia and for the unpleasantness with which its human cargo was treated. They encountered a more relaxed attitude in Australia – one guard summing up the character of the 'friendly enemy aliens' and famously asking one of them to hold his rifle while he lit a cigarette. Still, they were transported to a camp in Hay, a remote town in NSW. Both on the boat trip to Australia and thence at Hay, Gruen benefited from the ubiquity of highly educated fellow inmates from musicians to philosophers of considerable standing in Europe. These people became mentors, and Miss Margaret Read (later Mrs Margaret Holmes) of the Student Christian Movement assisted Gruen and others in accessing books and other University resources for study.

Gruen graduated from the University of Melbourne, though, given the difficulty he experienced studying – either in the camp or in war service (on one occasion not knowing if he would receive permission to sit the exam until two months before it was held) – Gruen described the results he achieved as mediocre.

After the war he married Ann Margaret Darvall in May 1947. He commenced work as a graduate at the NSW Department of Agriculture, but it became clear to him that he could not get adequate training in Australia. So the couple went to the United States. He studied there for two years, first at the University of Wisconsin–Madison and then at the University of Chicago; five members of that university's economics department present at the time would go on to win the Nobel Prize in Economics. Though he completed the examinations for his PhD, Gruen did not finish the degree as the intensity of his study led to a serious thyroid condition. Without drugs that had been developed shortly before then, the condition would have been life-threatening. However, it was successfully treated and its only legacy for the rest of his life was the exemplary balance Gruen kept in his life. He worked hard and productively, but not obsessively for the rest of his life.

== Career beginnings ==
Returning to Australia he worked for 12 years in the NSW Department of Agriculture where he met, assisted and was assisted by many young people who later made their marks in agricultural and other areas of economics. His sons David and Nicholas were born in August 1954 and April 1957 respectively. In 1959 he moved to a research position at the Australian National University (ANU) in Canberra for five years under T. W. Swan (of Solow–Swan growth model fame) and thence to Monash University in Melbourne to become Professor of Agricultural Economics in 1964.

Gruen's achievements in nine years at Monash include leading a major long range forecasting study on Australian agriculture funded by the US Department of Agriculture. Though John Freebairn subsequently tested its price projections for 1970 and found them "neither significantly more or less accurate than the naïve model price forecasts" the study achieved worthwhile technical advances which later contributed to the building of Australia's ORANI model mostly at Monash University.

== Contribution to the tariff debate ==
Probably the most influential paper Gruen wrote during this period was never published. It set-off the Australian 'tariff compensation' debate in the late 1960s. The arguments were taken up in the 1970s generating considerable professional interest and controversy. Gruen pointed to the way in which tariffs for manufactures imposed costs on export industries, particularly agricultural industries. As an early and strong advocate of lower levels of industry assistance, Gruen's point was not to advocate additional assistance for farmers so much as to challenge the idea that farmers might have low levels of assistance removed before manufactures had higher levels of assistance removed. He caviled at the "attitude ... that anything any farm pressure group asked for was ipso facto unjustifiable". Gruen then commissioned Professor Peter Lloyd to write the survey of Australian economics of protection which would survey the tariff compensation debate. Lloyd had been one of Gruen's main opponents in the tariff compensation debate and his survey argued that the case for tariff compensation had been overstated – including in a Green Paper on Rural Policy in 1974 of which Gruen was a co-signatory. Gruen later agreed with Lloyd's analysis on the point.

Gruen also published a theoretical curiosity with Max Corden in 1970 "A tariff that worsens the terms of trade", though it was focused on a specific policy problem.

In response to growing unease at Monash University, Gruen attempted to engage with the more reasonable student radicals and set up complaints mechanisms. When those mechanisms sometimes found against his colleagues, his faculty became – unsurprisingly – less congenial to him and so, when he was offered a chair at the ANU in late 1971, he "accepted with alacrity".

Shortly afterward, following the election of the first Labor Government in 23 years under the leadership of Gough Whitlam, Gruen was approached by the Secretary of the Department of the Prime Minister and Cabinet to become a special consultant to the department to enable it to provide economic advice that was independent of the Federal Treasury. He accepted the position, though did so on a part-time basis to enable him to also fulfill duties at the ANU.

In 1973 with Australia experiencing sharply rising inflation and strong current account surpluses, Gruen proposed a 25 percent across the board tariff cut, which was adopted by the Whitlam government. Gruen regarded this as his greatest achievement and it is probably the policy he is best known for.

== Post-advisory career ==
In August 1975 he informed the Prime Minister's Department of his desire to return to the ANU full-time and he made the move in March 1976, remaining at the ANU as professor and then as professor emeritus for the rest of his life.

Gruen was an academic entrepreneur initiating projects such as a series of reviews of Australian economics, a survey of the Australian economy by the Brookings Institution and the foundation of the Centre for Economic Policy Research. As an administrator, he was responsible for hiring and encouraging many of Australia's best-known academic economists. Many were somewhat to the left of centre, though few trenchantly so, but for Gruen one's position on the political spectrum was never a pre-requisite. Indeed, he was a great believer in people having their ideological world view challenged. He hired Bob Gregory, Bruce Chapman, John Quiggin, Steve Dowrick and Cathy Baird.

The Hawke Government sought informal advice from Gruen from time to time and asked him to participate in several inquiries into economic policy matters. His greatest achievement was the unanimity of purpose he brought to a large group of people from very different walks of life comprising a committee to advise Government on the design of the assets test for government benefits. Under Gruen's chairmanship, the committee unanimously recommended that the test not exempt the family home from the assets test, though this advice proved too radical for the Government and the family home has been exempted from the assets test ever since.

== Retirement and legacy ==
At Gruen's testimonial dinner in 1986, former Prime Minister Gough Whitlam joked about Gruen's retirement, about the improved stature of economics in response to recent economic difficulties, and about the resignation of John Stone from his position as Secretary to the Federal Treasury to become a politician with the right of centre National Party. "When I first entered public life in Australia no one particularly noticed if economists retired, and still less, no one particularly cared how they spent their retirement. Now of course, everybody notices and everybody cares".

In the 1986 Queen's Birthday Honours Gruen was appointed an Officer of the Order of Australia (AO) "for service to education, particularly in the field of economics".

Gruen remained at the ANU in an emeritus position and continued working at his usual pace, writing many articles and helping others with their work.

In 1996 he was diagnosed with bladder cancer. His doctor asked if he had ever worked with aniline dyes. Though his time in England had saved him from the Nazis, his brief stint at the printers was probably responsible for the cancer. Despite surgery and chemotherapy, he died at the age of 76 in the John James Hospital in Canberra.

As a memorial to celebrate his life, his son Nicholas pointed to the following passage. In describing Gruen's fellow Austrian – composer Joseph Haydn – it uncannily summarised Gruen's qualities and even his two minor physical ailments.

(H)e must have been a very nice man to know. A person of singularly sweet, kind disposition, he made virtually no enemies. ... He was even-tempered, industrious, generous, had a good sense of humour ... enjoyed good health except for some eye trouble and rheumatism ... He [had] good common sense. He had integrity and intellectual honesty – the kind of honesty that could allow him to say, when Mozart's name came up, 'My friends often flatter me about my talent, but he was far above me'. He liked to dress well.

Gruen's final legacy to Australian economics is probably his two sons. Dr David Gruen has forged a successful career as a professional economist at the Reserve Bank of Australia and then as a senior official at the Federal Treasury, where he headed the Macroeconomic Group. He is now Australian Statistician. Dr Nicholas Gruen was an architect in the 1980s of the widely admired Button Car Plan – a plan for the transition of Australia's car industry to a regime of lower tariffs and higher export orientation – and has since advised the Business Council of Australia and the Productivity Commission as well as authoring reports for the Committee for Economic Development of Australia.

== See also ==
- Constant elasticity of transformation
