= Brian Pink =

Australian statistician

Australian Statistician
- In office 5 March 2007 – 12 January 2014
- Preceded by: Dennis Trewin
- Succeeded by: David Kalisch

Personal details
- Spouse(s): Sandra (first); Elizabeth (second)
- Children: Two
- Occupation: Public servant

Brian Pink is an Australian statistician, and was the Australian Statistician, the head of the Australian Bureau of Statistics (ABS), between 5 March 2007 and 12 January 2014.

Prior to September 1999, Brian Pink was the ABS's Statistical Support Group Manager, when he was appointed as the Government Statistician for New Zealand and Chief Executive of Statistics New Zealand.

== Biography ==
Pink's career in official statistics began in Australia with the then Commonwealth Bureau of Census and Statistics in Sydney in 1966, followed by postings to various state offices of its successor, the Australian Bureau of Statistics. He was Government Statistician and Chief Executive of Statistics New Zealand from late October 2000 to March 2007.

As well as his duties as ex officio member of the Australian Statistics Advisory Council, Pink is Vice Chairman of the OECD Committee on Statistics, and Australia's Head of Delegation to the United Nations Statistical Commission. He was President of the International Association for Official Statistics from 2005 to 2007.

Brian Pink professes strong views about the importance of the role of official statistics in society, beyond necessary government use.

== Controversy ==
Brian Pink has been involved in a number of controversies relating to employees of the ABS.

=== Bulletin ===
In April 2008, the distribution of a staff bulletin by union employees led Brian Pink to issue a letter which advised employees that continued distribution of bulletins would be in breach of the Australian Public Service Code of Conduct. This led to Federal Court action which was settled in mediation.

=== Sackings ===
In April 2009, the ABS was taken to the Australian Industrial Relations Commission by the Community and Public Sector Union for the manner in which staff were terminated, which resulted in a decision against the ABS.

Government offices
Preceded by Len Cook	Government Statistician, New Zealand; 2000–2007	Succeeded by Geoff Bascand
Preceded by Dennis Trewin	Australian Statistician; 2007–2014	Succeeded by David Kalisch
