= Census and Statistics Act 1905 =

Act of the Parliament of Australia

Parliament of Australia
- Long title: An Act relating to the Census and Statistics of the Commonwealth.
- Citation: No. 15 of 1905 or No. 15, 1905 as amended
- Territorial extent: States and territories of Australia
- Royal assent: 8 December 1905
- Commenced: 8 December 1905
- Status: Amended

The Census and Statistics Act 1905 (Cth) is an Act of the Parliament of Australia, that was passed in 1905, and provides the power to the Australian Statistician to collect statistical information in the form of a census. The Act also mandates that the Australian Bureau of Statistics must publish the information collected in the census whilst maintaining the privacy of participant's personal information. On 8 December 1905, the Act received royal assent whilst simultaneously beginning its initial commencement, and it has since been amended 19 times.

== Amendments ==
=== Privacy ===
Prior to 2001, all name-identified information relating the census' participants was destroyed once the statistical information was processed. After a trial period, this law was then changed to allow for name-identified information to be stored with the statistical information in the national archives for its public release after 99 years granted that the individuals consented.

== See also ==
- Census in Australia
