= Census in Australia =

National census of Australia, held every five years

Census of Population and Housing

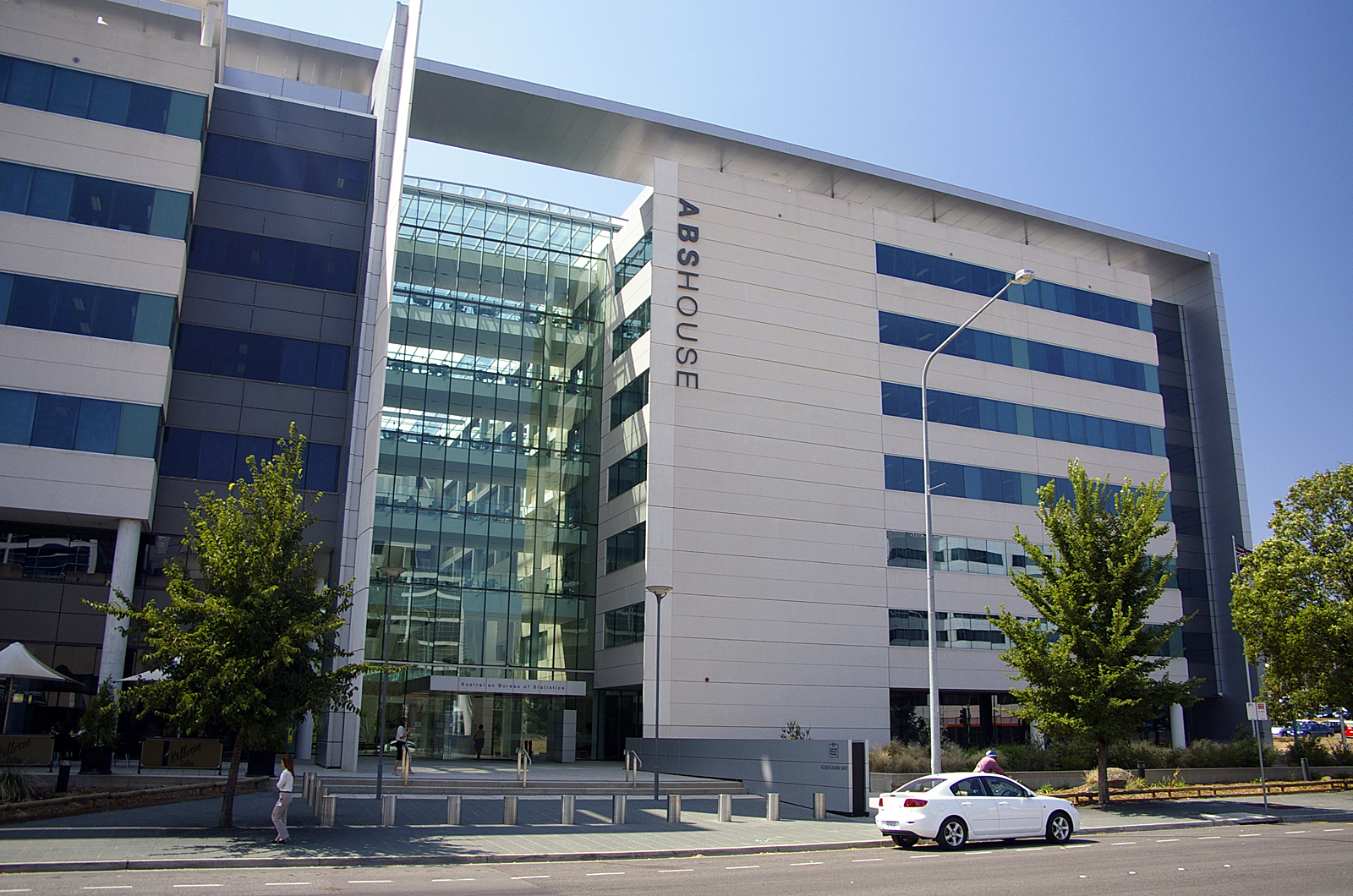
- ABS House, the headquarters for the Australian Bureau of Statistics

General information
- Country: Australia
- Website: census.gov.au

Results
- Total population: 25,956,142
- Most populous region: New South Wales (8,095,400)
- Least populous region: Jervis Bay Territory (313)

The Census in Australia, officially the Census of Population and Housing, is the national census in Australia that occurs every five years. The census collects key demographic, social and economic data from all people in Australia on census night, including overseas visitors and residents of Australian external territories, only excluding foreign diplomats. The census is the largest and most significant statistical event in Australia and is run by the Australian Bureau of Statistics (ABS). Every person must complete the census, although some personal questions are not compulsory. The penalty for failing to complete the census after being directed to by the Australian Statistician is A$220. The Australian Bureau of Statistics Act 1975 and Census and Statistics Act 1905 authorise the ABS to collect, store, and share anonymised data.

The first Australian census was held on 2 April 1911, but census data had been previously collected by individual states.

The most recent census was held on 11 August 2026. The next census is being held in 2031.

== Geographical divisions ==
The census, like all ABS data, is collected and published in geographical divisions as defined by the Australian Statistical Geography Standard (ASGS). The ASGS was released in 2011, replacing the former Australian Standard Geographical Classification. The Standard is reviewed and updated every five years to align with the census. The ABS also releases data divided into areas not managed by the Bureau, such as postcodes (managed by Australia Post) and Local Government Areas (managed by state and territory governments).

== Privacy ==
The Census and Statistics Act 1905 and Privacy Act 1988 prohibit the ABS from releasing any personally identifiable census data to any government, private or individual entity.

In 1979, the Australian Law Reform Commission released Privacy and the Census, a report detailing legislative privacy measures related to the census. One of the key elements under question was the inclusion of names and addresses in census data. It was found that excluding names reduced the accuracy of the data; individuals were more likely to leave questions blank. Not collecting this data would also impair the ability of the ABS to ensure that all participants have responded.

The ABS protects personal information primarily through anonymisation of data. Personal information is stored separately from other census data, and separately from each other. Names are mutated into anonymised codes, which are then used to link data.

=== Destruction of personal information ===
Historically, the ABS has destroyed census forms or other census-related personal information after the census data processing period, roughly 18 months after the census.

Following a public consultation process before the 2016 census, it was found that Australians expected the ABS to hold their information for as long as there is a benefit to the community, and should be destroyed as soon as that need no longer exists. Following this process, the ABS has revised the retention period to four years after census, instead of 18 months. Concurrently, the ABS also improved their anonymisation techniques and limits access to addresses and anonymised names to when only necessary.

=== Census Time Capsule ===
Since 2001, the ABS and National Archives of Australia have given respondents the option to have their complete census data, including name and address, stored in the Census Time Capsule. The capsule is stored securely at the National Archives for 99 years after each census and is released publicly at the end of that period. The first capsule opening will be on 7 August 2100.

== Counting of Indigenous Australians ==
Indigenous Australians in contact with the colonists were enumerated at many of the colonial censuses. When the Federation of Australia occurred in 1901, the new Constitution contained a provision (section 127), which said: "In reckoning the numbers of the people of the Commonwealth, or of a State or other part of the Commonwealth, Aboriginal [persons ...] shall not be counted." In 1967, a referendum was held which approved two amendments to the Australian constitution relating to Indigenous Australians. The second of the two amendments deleted section 127 from the Constitution. It was widely believed at the time of the referendum, and is still often said, that section 127 meant that Aboriginal persons were not counted in Commonwealth censuses before 1967. In fact section 127 related to calculating the population of the states and territories for the purpose of allocating seats in Parliament and per capita Commonwealth grants. Its purpose was to prevent Queensland and Western Australia using their large Aboriginal populations to gain extra seats or extra funds. Thus the Commonwealth Bureau of Census and Statistics interpreted section 127 as meaning that they may enumerate Aboriginal persons but that they must be excluded from published tabulations of population. Aboriginal persons living in settled areas were counted to a greater or lesser extent in all censuses before 1967.

George Handley Knibbs, the first Commonwealth Statistician, obtained a legal opinion at the time that persons of 50 percent or more non-Aboriginal descent were not Aboriginal persons for the purposes of the Constitution. (Note: This could have been considered offensive because no consideration was given to (1) how the person themself identified, nor (2) whether or not the person was accepted as such by the community in which they lived. When the person does not identify, or the community does not accept the person, as such, it is also a violation of article 20 of the Universal Declaration of Human Rights.) At the first Australian census in 1911 only those Aboriginal persons living near white settlements were enumerated, and the main population tables included only those of 50 percent or more non-Aboriginal descent. Details of Aboriginal persons of 50 percent or more non-Aboriginal descent were included in separate tables to Aboriginal persons of more than 50 percent Aboriginal descent. This practice was followed in all subsequent censuses up to 1966.

Since 1967, the ABS has considered Torres Strait Islanders a separate Indigenous people. Prior to 1947, Torres Strait Islanders were regarded as Aboriginal and excluded when not of 50 percent or more non-Aboriginal descent. In 1947, Torres Strait Islanders were considered to be Polynesian and in 1954 and 1961 were considered to be Pacific Islanders. In 1966, Torres Strait Islanders were again regarded as Aboriginal and excluded when not of 50 percent or more non-Aboriginal descent.

== Australian Standard Classification of Cultural and Ethnic Groups ==
Ancestry data was included in the 1986 census. It was found when the data was evaluated that people who filled in the census were not sure what the question meant and there were inconsistent results, particularly for those people whose families had been in Australia for many generations. There were no ancestry related questions in 1991 or 1996. For 2001 it was decided that development of Government policies did need information about people who were either born overseas, or whose parents were born overseas. The questions were to mark the ancestries most closely identified with and to consider ancestry back as far as three generations. Respondents had the option of reporting more than one ancestry but only the first two ancestries they reported were coded for the census.

The results for 2001 were coded using the Australian Standard Classification of Cultural and Ethnic Groups (ASCCEG). This classification of cultural and ethnic groups is based on the geographic area in which a group originated or developed; and the similarity of cultural and ethnic groups in terms of social and cultural characteristics. The classification is specific to Australian needs and was developed by the Australian Bureau of Statistics. The classification is based on the self-perceived group identification approach, using a self assessed response to a direct question. This approach measures the extent to which individuals associate with particular cultural or ethnic groups.

== History ==
=== 1828 ===
Australia's first census was held in November 1828 in New South Wales, a British colony at the time. Previous government statistical reports had been taken from "musters" where white immigrants were brought together for counting. In 1828, the white population was 36,598: 20,870 settlers and 15,728 convicts. 23.8% of the population were born in the colony and 24.5% were women. There were 25,248 Protestants and 11,236 Catholics. Indigenous Australians were not counted.

Of the 36,598 people, 638 were living in what is now Queensland. There were also 18,128 people in Tasmania.

=== 1881 ===
In the mid-19th century the colonial statisticians encouraged compatibility between the colonies in their respective censuses, and in 1881 a census was held simultaneously in each of the colonies. This was part of a census of the British Empire. The questions posed in the colonies were not uniform and Henry Heylyn Hayter, who conducted the Victorian census, found that this caused difficulties in dealing with Australia-wide data.

The population of Australia counted in the census was 2,231,531.

1881 census population results
New South Wales	Victoria	Queensland	Tasmania	South Australia*	Western Australia	Australia
741,412	858,605	211,040	114,790	276,393	29,561	2,231,531

At the time, the Northern Territory was part of South Australia and had 3,451 white people plus 6,346 Aboriginals in settled districts. Including the Northern Territory, South Australia had a total counted population of 286,211 people. The reported population of Western Australia did not include Aboriginal persons of more than 50 percent Aboriginal descent. The population of greater Melbourne was 282,947 and of Sydney was 224,939.

=== 1891 ===
1891 census population results
New South Wales	Victoria	Queensland	Tasmania	South Australia*	Western Australia	Australia
1,153,170	1,158,372	400,395	151,150	324,721	53,177	3,240,985

=== 1901 ===
In 1901, there were 3,773,801 people (1,977,928 males and 1,795,873 females) counted in Australia.

Prior to federation, each colony had been responsible for its own census collection. The census held during the first year of Federation, 1901, was again collected by each state separately. When planning for the 1901 census it was clear that federation was soon to occur, and a uniform census schedule was adopted.

=== 1911 ===
The first national census was developed by the Commonwealth Bureau of Census and Statistics. The census occurred at midnight between 2 and 3 April 1911. Tabulation was carried out almost entirely by hand; over 4 million cards were sorted and physically counted for each tabulation. Results from the 1911 census took a long time to be released, with delays increased by World War I. The Australian population was counted in the census as 4,455,005, exclusive of Aboriginal persons of more than 50 percent Aboriginal descent.

In the 1911 census, many collectors used horses. A drought in Western Australia meant that some collectors were unable to find feed for their horses. Flooding and bogs stranded some collectors in Queensland.

==== Rubella research ====
In 1911 the census asked about deaf-mutism. This question was also asked in the next two censuses of 1921 and 1933. Deaf-mutism was found to be very high among 10- to 14-year-olds, with the same pattern existing in the 1921 census among 20- to 24-year-olds. The statisticians report on the 1921 census noted that it was "a reasonable assumption therefore that the abnormal number of deaf-mutes . . . was the result of the extensive epidemic of infectious diseases which occurred soon after many in those age groups were born". Rubella was not known to be a possible contributor. During World War II, the ophthalmologist Norman McAllister Gregg began to investigate the connection between birth defects and the infection of mothers early in their pregnancy. In 1951, prompted by Gregg's work, Australian statistician Oliver Lancaster examined the census figures of 1911, 1921 and 1933. He found a peak in the level of deaf-mutism in the age cohort born in 1898 and 1899 and that this matched with a known outbreak of rubella in those years. "This was the first time in the world that the link between rubella and congenital problems with unborn children was firmly established."

=== 1921–1961 ===
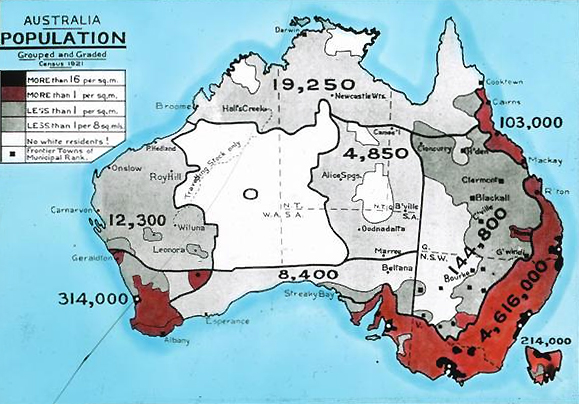
Lantern slide produced for the Australian Inland Mission based on the 1921 census. It shows the Australian population enumerated in the census graded for population density.

Australia's population counted in April 1921 was 5,435,700, exclusive of Aboriginal persons of more than 50 percent Aboriginal descent. The Statistician independently estimated the number of Aboriginal persons, both those of more than 50 percent Aboriginal descent and those of 50 percent or more non-Aboriginal descent, by obtaining figures from police and protectors of Aboriginal persons throughout the country.

One of the significant findings of the 1921 census was the low rate of males to females in the 20–30 age group, showing the impact of World War I on the population.

The 1921 census introduced automatic machine tabulation equipment, hired from England for the census. Three punched cards were used to store individual, dwelling, and family information. The cards were processed using an electric sorting machine prior to final totalling with an electric tabulator machine, devised by Herman Hollerith.

The census was subsequently conducted in 1933, 1947, 1954, and every five years from 1961 onwards.

=== 1966 ===
The 1966 Australian census was the seventh national population census conducted on 30 June 1966. The total population of the Commonwealth of Australia was counted as 11,550,462 – an increase of 1,042,276 people or 9.92%. Results were released under statistician J. P. O'Neill in a series of three publications beginning in April 1967.

=== 1971 ===
Following the 1967 referendum removing section 127 from the Constitution, the "race" question was re-designed for the 1971 census and methods for remote area collection examined to improve identification of Indigenous Australian groups.

There were 12,755,638 people counted.

=== 1976 ===
The 1976 census was the largest undertaken to date, with 53 questions. Due to budgetary restraints, the ABS was not able to complete normal processing of the data and a 50% sample was processed. There were 13,548,450 people counted.

=== 1981 ===
The 1981 census was held on 30 June 1981. Scanned data of the 1981 Census is available on the ABS website.

=== 1986 ===
The 1986 census was held on 30 June 1986. Scanned data of the 1986 Census is available on the ABS website.

=== 1991 ===
The 1991 census was held on 6 August 1991.

=== 1996 ===
The 1996 census was held on 6 August. There were 16,892,423 people counted in Australia. Of these, 342,864 people identified themselves as Indigenous Australians. There were 139,594 overseas visitors.

=== 2001 ===
The 2001 census was held on 7 August. There were 18,769,249 people counted in Australia. Of these, 410,003 people identified as Indigenous Australians. There were 203,101 overseas visitors.

=== 2006 ===
The 2006 census was conducted on the night of 8 August. There were 19,855,288 people counted in Australia. Of those, 455,031 people identified as Indigenous Australians. There were 206,358 overseas visitors. For the first time, the territories of Cocos (Keeling) Islands were included in the 2006 census, following the enactment of the Territories Law Reform Act 1992.

The 2006 census contained 60 questions, all of which were compulsory except those relating to religion and household census data retention. The census cost around A$300 million to conduct.

==== eCensus ====
For the first time, respondents were given the option of completing an online "eCensus" as opposed to the traditional paper-based version. By 17 August, more than 720,000 households had completed the census online.

Across Australia, 8.4% of estimated dwellings lodged online. The highest percentage of internet lodgements was in the Australian Capital Territory with 14.8% of households using eCensus. This was a markedly different proportion of households than elsewhere in Australia, with the other states and territory ranging from 5.9% in the Northern Territory to 8.9% in Western Australia.

The peak lodgement was between 8pm and 9pm on census night, when more than 72,000 online forms were received. The eCensus remained available throughout the entire census period. During the 24-hour period of 8 August (census night), eCensus delivered more than 12.5 million page views and at 8:47 pm, more than 55,000 households were logged on simultaneously. IBM assisted with the development of the eCensus, having provided similar infrastructure and technology for the Canadian census earlier that year.

=== 2011 ===
The 2011 census was held on the night of 9 August, using both paper and electronic "eCensus" forms. Minimal changes were made from the 2006 census due to financial constraints on the ABS during development. The 2011 census was the largest logistical peacetime operation ever undertaken in Australia, employing over 43,000 field staff to ensure approximately 14.2 million forms were delivered to 9.8 million households.

The first results of the census were released in June 2012 on the Australian Bureau of Statistics website.

The cost of the 2011 census was A$440 million.

=== 2016 ===
ABS website message after the 2016 online census was shut down

The census occurred on 9 August 2016. For the first time, the ABS the census was by default filled out online, claiming it expected more than 65% of Australians would be completing the census online. Reflecting this new preference, the tagline of the ad campaign for the census was the rhyming slogan "Get online on August 9". Across many regions, paper forms were no longer delivered by default to homes, and households that wished to complete a paper census had to order such forms via an automated hotline. Letters were sent to each dwelling with unique code numbers that people would need to either login to the census website or order a paper form if they preferred. By census night, many households had still not received such a letter. Contrary to previous years where censuses were both delivered and retrieved from households by dedicated census employees, in 2016 most of the paperwork relating to the census was delivered from and to the ABS by Australia Post.

The 2016 census was met by two controversies. The first was that the retention of names and addresses increased to up to 4 years, from 18 months in the 2006 and 2011 censuses, leading to concerns about privacy and data security. Some Australian Senate crossbenchers (from the Greens, Nick Xenophon Team and Jacqui Lambie Network) said they would not complete those specific sections of the census, despite the fines associated with incorrect completion of the census. The second was that many Australians could not complete the census online on the designated day. While a paper census form was also available on request, for 2016 the ABS was aiming for two-thirds online. However, the online census website shut down at about 7:30 pm AEST on the night it was to be completed.

According to the ABS, throughout 9 August the census website received four denial-of-service attacks. At 7:30 pm, when the site was being heavily used, a software failure meant that the ABS was unable to keep blocking the denial-of-service attacks, leading to the failure of a router. As a result, the ABS decided to close down the system as a precaution. The ABS reported that no census data were compromised. The Australian Signals Directorate was assisting the ABS to bring the infrastructure back online more than 24 hours after the closure.

The census website was restored at 2:30 pm on 11 August. On the same day, Prime Minister Malcolm Turnbull stated his displeasure over the event, which had "been a failure of the ABS", with his expectation that "heads will roll" once a review was complete. Leader of the opposition Bill Shorten said that the 2016 census had been the "worst-run ... in the history of Australia". The ABS blamed service provider IBM for the failure in the online census, saying that IBM had advised on the preparedness and resilience to DDoS attacks and had not offered any further protections that could be employed. On 31 August, the Parliament of Australia initiated an inquiry into the 2016 census. It released its findings on 24 November: no individual party was found to be responsible but it was shared between the government, IBM, and other sub-contractors.

The census forms were able to be submitted online until 23 September. Once collection was complete, the ABS issued an announcement which confirmed that in spite of the initial online problems, there was a preliminary response rate of more than 96%. This consisted of 4.9 million (over 58%) online submissions and 3.5 million paper forms. The preliminary response rate was similar to the previous two census response rates of 95.8% in 2006 and 96.5% in 2011.

According to the ABS, the preliminary release of census data became available to the public on the ABS website on 11 April 2017, two months earlier than for any previous census. The main release of data occurred on 27 June 2017 and a final data release on 17 October 2017.

=== 2021 ===
The 2021 Census occurred on 10 August 2021, and was run by the Australian Bureau of Statistics (ABS). It was Australia's 18th Census.

The 2021 Census achieved a response rate above the Australian Bureau of Statistics target, obtaining data from 10 million (10,852,208) dwellings. The dwelling response rate was 96.1 per cent, up from 95.1 per cent in 2016.

The Statistical Independent Assurance Panel, established by the Australian Statistician to provide assurance of Census data quality, concluded that the 2021 Census data is fit-for-purpose, is of comparable quality to the 2011 and 2016 Censuses, and can be used with confidence.

The first release of the Census data was published on 28 June 2022. Census data can be accessed using a number of Census data tools.

=== 2026 ===
The 2026 Census occurred on 11 August 2026, and was run by the Australian Bureau of Statistics (ABS). It was Australia's 19th Census.

The 2026 Census was the first to include questions regarding gender identity and sexual orientation, with citizens aged 16 and over given the option to identify themselves or to choose not to answer. There were also updates surrounding ancestry, sex at birth, and country of parental birth questions.

== See also ==
- Census and Statistics Act 1905
- Demography of Australia
- List of cities in Australia by population
