= National Aboriginal and Torres Strait Islander Social Survey =

The National Aboriginal and Torres Strait Islander Social Survey (NATSISS) is a statistical survey administered by the Australian Bureau of Statistics which collects information on the social situation of Indigenous Australians (who are either Aboriginal Australians or Torres Strait Islanders), including on health, education, culture and labour force participation. The surveys are carried out every six years, starting in 2002. It succeeded the National Aboriginal and Torres Strait Islander Survey (NATSIS), the last survey of which was carried out in 1994.

The 2008 survey was carried out from August 2008 to April 2009 and involved about 13,300 Indigenous Australians.
