= Bill McLennan =

Australian statistician (1942–2022)

William Patrick McLennan AM CBE (26 January 1942 – 19 March 2022) was an Australian statistician who was Director of the Central Statistical Office (CSO) of the United Kingdom and Australian Statistician, head of the Australian Bureau of Statistics.

== Early years ==
Bill McLennan was born on 26 January 1942 in Grafton, New South Wales. He joined the Australian Bureau of Statistics (ABS) on 29 February 1960 as a statistics cadet and by 1964 had completed a degree in Statistics and Economics from the Australian National University and started working at the ABS full-time.

== Australian Bureau of Statistics ==
McLennan spent almost all his career at the ABS. Initially, he worked on sampling and methodology, then was promoted to Assistant Statistician in 1973. He left the ABS in 1979 to become Victorian Deputy Commonwealth Statistician in Melbourne but shortly afterwards, he was promoted to First Assistant Statistician and returned to the ABS as the head of Coordination and Management Division, where he led a review of the Census and Statistics Act in the early 1980s. He oversaw the establishment of the corporate planning system and the production of the ABS's first Corporate Plan in 1987. He championed the adoption of PC and Internet technologies to reduce the cost structure in the ABS and improved the readability of statistical output. In 1986, he became Deputy Australian Statistician. In 1992 McLennan was appointed a Member of the Order of Australia.

== Central Statistical Office, United Kingdom ==
In 1992, McLennan was appointed Director of the Central Statistical Office (CSO) and head of the Government Statistical Service of the United Kingdom. He was the first person from outside the UK to be appointed to that post.

During his tenure, he proposed the merger of the OPCS and the CSO in August 1994, which was subsequently announced by Prime Minister John Major in September 1995 following a consultation period and took place on 1 April 1996 when the Office for National Statistics was launched. He persuaded the Chancellor of the Exchequer, Norman Lamont, to reduce ministerial access to economic statistics in advance of publication and to permit statistics to be released independently of ministers. He produced the Official Statistics Code of Practice, first published in April 1995, which set good practice and principles for statisticians producing official statistics with the aim of promoting high standards and maintaining public confidence in official statistics. He led the CSO through its early years as a 'Next Steps Agency' with demanding and quantified targets for the accuracy of statistics.

== United Nations Statistical Commission ==
McLennan was Chairman of the United Nations Statistical Commission from 1994 to 1995.

== Australian Statistician ==
McLennan became the Australian Statistician and head of the Australian Bureau of Statistics from 1995. During this period, he developed the work and direction of the ABS; placed great emphasis on the professional development of the staff; and provided a focus for the international activities of the Bureau, with a special emphasis on Asia. He retired on 30 June 2000.

Government offices
Preceded by Jack Hibbert	Director of the Central Statistical Office, UK; 1992–1994	Succeeded by Tim Holt
Preceded by Ian Castles	Australian Statistician; 1995–2000	Succeeded by Dennis Trewin
