= George Handley Knibbs =

Australian scientist

Sir George Knibbs CMG FRSN
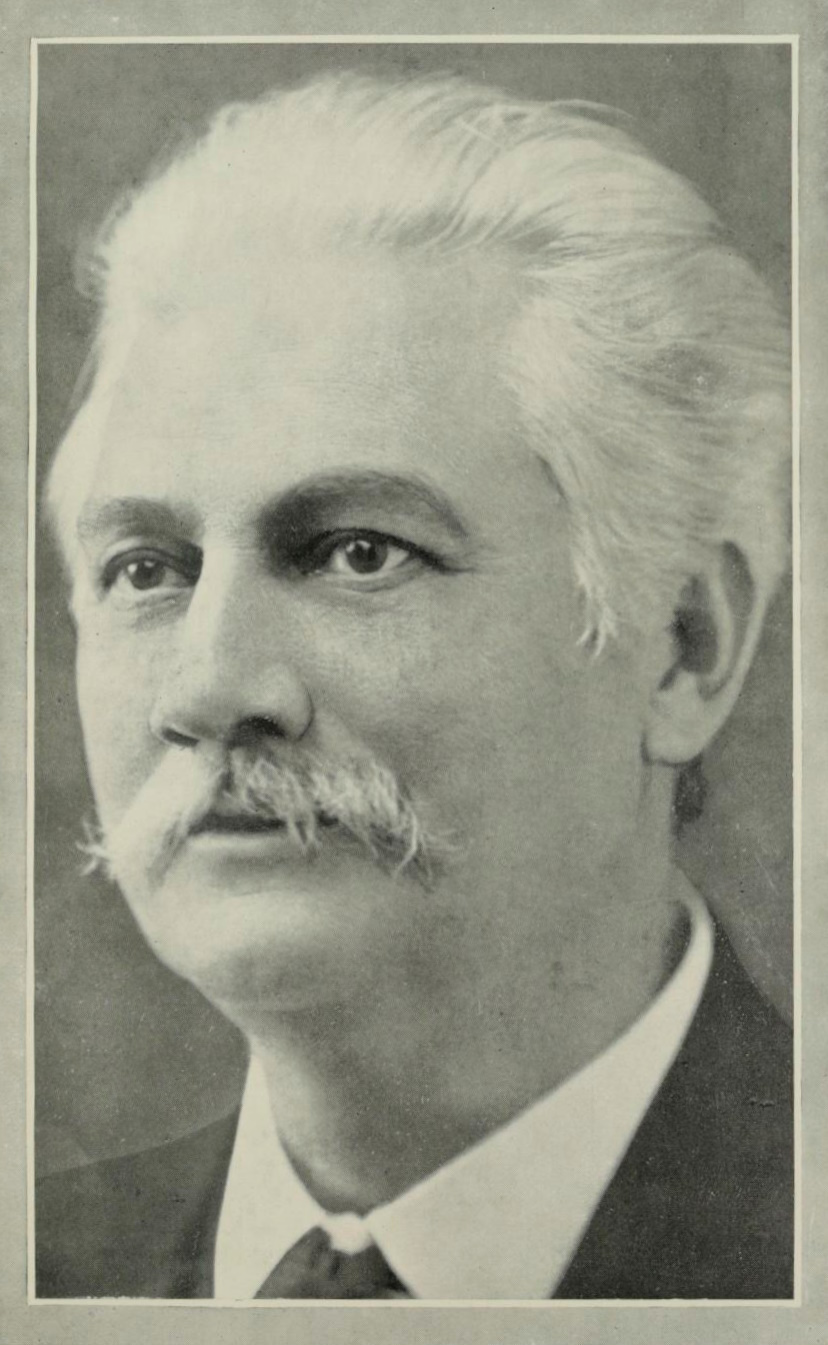
- Photograph of George H. Knibbs (1911)
- Born: George Handley Knibbs; 13 June 1858; Sydney, Australia
- Died: 30 March 1929 (aged 70); Camberwell, Victoria, Australia
- Known for: Australian Statistician
- Spouse: Susan Keele James
- Parent(s): John Handley Knibbs, Ellen Curthoys

Sir George Handley Knibbs CMG FRSN (13 June 1858 – 30 March 1929) was a respected Australian statistician and public servant. He was the first Commonwealth Statistician, appointed to lead the Commonwealth Bureau of Census and Statistics after the federation of Australian colonies. Knibbs held the position from May 1906 until early 1921, after which he was appointed as the first director of the Commonwealth Institute of Science and Industry (the predecessor of the CSIRO), a position he held for five years.

Knibbs began his working life as a surveyor, in government service as well as in private practice. From 1890 he lectured in surveying and related fields at Sydney University. From 1902 until early 1905 Knibbs was employed by the New South Wales Department of Public Instruction, including a period as an education commissioner, investigating and reporting on the latest educational methods of Britain, Europe and America.

After Knibbs was appointed to lead the newly formed Commonwealth Bureau of Census and Statistics in 1906, he began the task of establishing procedures to ensure the uniformity of data collection from the offices of statistics of the Australian states, including preparations for the first federal census. He supervised the publication of the Commonwealth Year Book in 1908, the first of an annual series of authoritative and highly regarded compilations of national statistical and historic information. Under Knibbs' direction the first commonwealth census was carried out in 1911, followed by a 'war census' in 1915. Knibbs developed an international reputation for his competency as a statistician. The ability and confidence that marked his leadership as the federal statistician greatly elevated the standing of the Commonwealth Bureau of Census and Statistics.

In early 1921 Knibbs was appointed director of the newly established Institute of Science and Industry, on a five year contract. Despite government expenditure reductions the institute initiated measures to increase pastoral production and the eradication of pest species. Knibbs resigned at the end of his period of employment due to ill health.

== Biography ==
=== Early life ===
George Handley Knibbs was born on 13 June 1858 the family home at Frederick Place in inner-city Sydney, the eldest of five children of John Handley Knibbs and Ellen (née Curthoys). His father's occupation was recorded as a foreman. The family lived in inner Sydney, after about 1865 in Petersham.

=== Surveyor ===
In December 1877 Knibbs was appointed to the New South Wales Department of Lands after being found to be competent as a candidate "for license to survey under the Crown Lands Acts". In January 1878 he was appointed a licensed surveyor, on the staff of the Trigonometrical and General Survey of New South Wales. Knibbs resigned from the Survey Department in 1879 to take up private practice as a surveyor.

George Knibbs and Susan Keele James were married on 2 January 1883 at Petersham.

In May 1883 Knibbs was specially licensed as a surveyor under the Real Property Act. In June 1883 he was appointed to the permanent staff of the General Survey section of the Department of Lands as a licensed surveyor. In the course of his work Knibbs was known as a government surveyor.

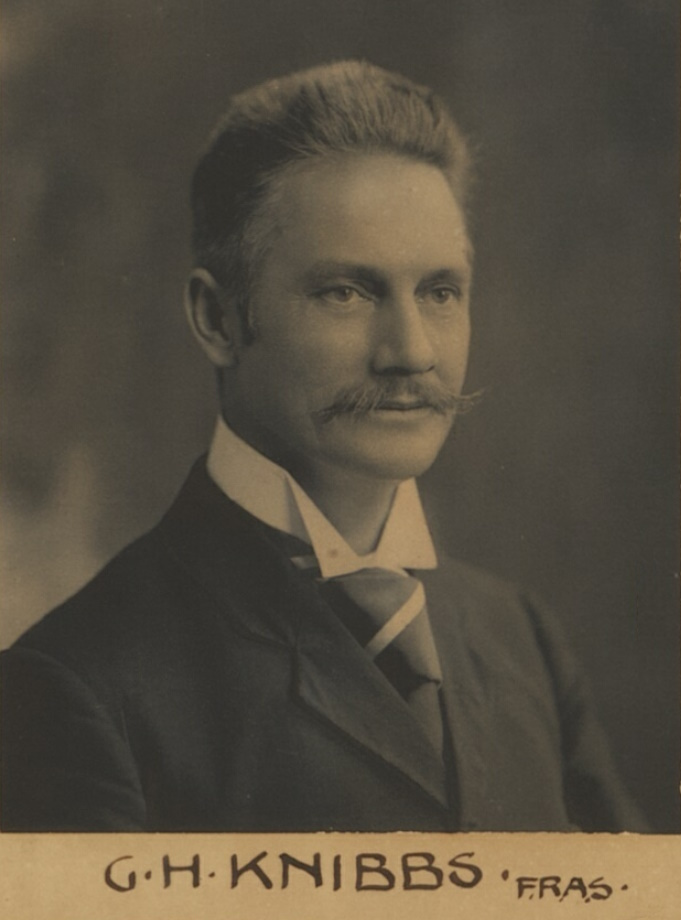
Photograph of George H. Knibbs (1898).

=== University lecturer ===
In May 1890 Knibbs was appointed as a lecturer on surveying in the engineering department at Sydney University. His position at the university was as an 'independent lecturer', "responsible directly for his teaching to the University Senate".

Knibbs contributed scientific articles to a large number of Australian and international journals. He had joined the Royal Society of New South Wales in 1881 and was honorary secretary and editor of its Journal and Proceedings for nine years. He served as president of the Society in 1899-1900. Knibbs was elected president of the Institute of Surveyors in 1892. He served in that role for a total of four years. In 1897 and 1898 Knibbs was elected president of the New South Wales branch of the British Astronomical Society.

In 1899 Alexander Oliver, president of the New South Wales Land Court, was appointed by the then-colonial government to examine and report on suggested sites for a federal capital, in respect of desirable characteristics, locations and the probable cost of constructing public buildings. Knibbs was one of four experts selected to advise Oliver. The three others on the expert panel were G. Allen Mansfield (chairman), Walter L. Vernon (government architect) and John Barlow (president of the Institute of Architects). In September and October 1901 Knibbs and Barlow presented papers and led discussions on the subject of 'The Federal Capital' at combined meetings of the Institute of Architects and the Institute of Surveyors in Sydney.

During his fifteen years as a lecturer at Sydney University Knibbs lectured in subjects such as geodesy, astronomy and hydraulics. In 1905 he served as the acting professor of physics.

=== Education commissioner ===
In about April 1902 Knibbs and John W. Turner were appointed to the Education Commission, with instructions to visit Great Britain, Europe and America "for the purpose of inquiring into the all-important question of primary and technical education" and to report upon "the latest educational methods".^{[A]}

In July 1902 a conference was held in the Colonial Office in London between representatives of Australian and New Zealand universities and Oxford University authorities. The Australian delegation was led by the prime minister Sir Edmund Barton (who was in London to attend the coronation of King Edward VII). The University of Sydney was represented at the conference by the education commissioners, Knibbs and Turner, who had arrived in England on the first stage of their tour investigating international education methods and institutions. During the meeting the Oxford University authorities expressed a desire to establish "closer connection with the colonial universities" and "as far us possible, pay attention to the requirements of students destined for professions or the higher ranks of the civil service of the colonies, and also of students who are holders of the colonial Oxford scholarships founded by the late Cecil Rhodes in his international education bequest".

The education commissioners, Turner and Knibbs, arrived back in Sydney in February 1903 aboard the R.M.S. Ventura from San Francisco, after an absence of about ten months. Knibbs served as the first president of the Society for Child Study during the period from December 1903 to 1905.

In about February 1905 Knibbs was appointed as the Director of Technical Education within the New South Wales Department of Public Instruction.

=== Commonwealth Statistician ===
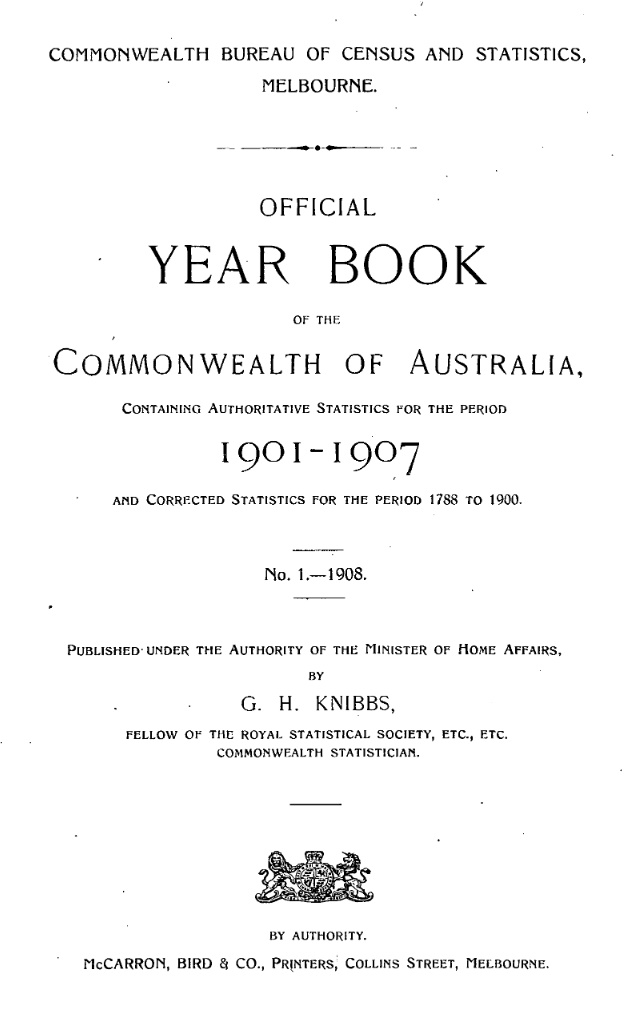
Title page of Official Year Book of the Commonwealth of Australia: No. 1 – 1908.

The 'Census and Statistics Act 1905' was passed by the federal parliament in 1905 and received royal assent in December that year. The Act enabled the government to establish a central bureau of statistics under a Commonwealth Statistician, in order to collect statistical information in the form of a census, collate information "as to the progress of Australia" and publish returns "with respect to matters under its special jurisdiction". In February 1906 the position of Commonwealth Statistician was offered to Timothy Coghlan, who had been the New South Wales statistician since 1886. Coghlan was in London at the time, having been appointed acting Agent-General for New South Wales in February 1905. He declined the post of federal statistician in favour of a counter offer by the state government of Agent-General for a three-year term.

George H. Knibbs was appointed as the federal statistician in May 1906. He began his duties in a temporary office at the Department of Home Affairs in Russell Street, Melbourne. Soon afterwards the offices of the Commonwealth Bureau of Census and Statistics (as it became known) were relocated to the Rialto building in Collins Street. After his appointment Knibbs visited state statisticians to ascertain the methods by which statistics were compiled in the various Australian states. He then suggested to the Minister for Home Affairs, Littleton Groom, "the desirability of all the statistical authorities co-operating for the purpose of arriving at a unification of methods". A conference of statistical officers of the Australian commonwealth and individual states and New Zealand opened on 30 November 1906 in Melbourne.

In 1906 Knibbs was elected a fellow of the Royal Statistical Society of England (and was later made an honorary fellow). He was also made a member of the International Institute of Statistics, a life member of the British Science Guild, an honorary member of the American Statistical Association and an honorary member of the Statistical Society of Paris.

In 1908 Knibbs supervised the publication by the Bureau of Census and Statistics of the first of a series of official year books of the commonwealth of Australia. The introductory publication covered the period 1901 to 1907 and represented an authoritative and comprehensive historical and statistical survey of the period from the federation of Australia. In its 931 pages the Official Year Book of the Commonwealth of Australia: No. 1 – 1908 also included "corrected statistics" and historical information for the period 1788 to 1900.

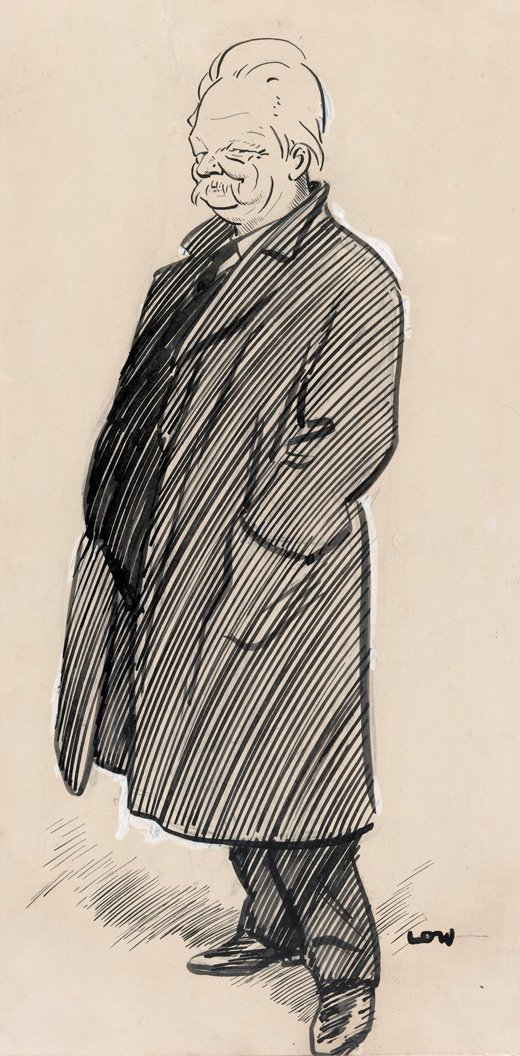
Caricature of George Knibbs by David Low, 1919.

In November 1908 Joseph H. Hood, a judge of the Victorian Supreme Court, was appointed as a royal commissioner to inquire into the law and operations of all types of insurance in Australia (to report by June 1909). Knibbs, as the federal statistician, was appointed as technical advisor to the royal commission. Knibbs considered his official duties as extending beyond the boundaries of statistical collection, seeing his role as "assisting the administrative statesman with his counsel and advice".

In late-April 1909 Knibbs travelled to England aboard the R.M.S. Marmora in order to attend international congresses in Europe, with the principal object of investigating efficient means of gathering census data and to enquire into the organisation of the statistical departments of other countries. Knibbs was the delegate representing the Australian government at the International Insurance Congress held in Vienna. In Paris he attended a Special Committee for the Revision of the Nomenclature of Diseases and a meeting of the International Institute of Statistics. He also attended the International Congress on the Scientific Testing of Materials at Copenhagen. The last conference Knibbs attended was the Congress of the International Geodetical Institute held in London. In December 1909 he returned to Australia aboard the R.M.S. Morea.

In early 1910 Knibbs travelled to England to finalise arrangements with the English Registrar-General to co-ordinate the collecting of census data in Australia with the British census, both to be carried out on 2 April 1911. By June 1910 the logistics for carrying out the 1911 census in Australia had been decided upon. Under the scheme each state would appoint a "supervisor of Commonwealth census" (the state statistician in each state except Western Australia), with powers delegated to them by the federal statistician, George Knibbs. Each state was to be divided into census districts supervised by an "enumerator", under whom would be a staff of men to deliver census forms to each household and collect them after completion. In each census district the enumerator would "make a rough count" and forward the papers to state headquarters. The state supervisor would then conduct another count and "send the result to the Commonwealth Statistician".

In January 1911 Knibbs was created a Companion of the Order of St. Michael and St. George (CMG) in the British royal birthday honours. Knibbs wrote many articles for the annual year books and other statistical publications, and also wrote monographs on population and mathematics. In December 1913 two books of verse by Knibbs, contained within a single volume, were published by the London publishing firm of Alston Rivers Ltd.. Voices of the North, inspired by Finland, the country and its poetry, included original verse and "paraphrases, rather than strict translations, of poems by Finnish authors". Echoes of Hellas was inspired by Greece and Hellenic culture and included both original poems and translations. Knibbs was an inaugural member of the Eugenics Education Society of Melbourne, formed in July 1914 (affiliated with the London Eugenics Education Society).

In August 1914, after the outbreak of World War I, Knibbs was appointed to a commission to inquire and report upon "the supplies of various foodstuffs in Australia" and the amounts available for export, with attention to "matters relating to trade and industry arising out of the war". The other commissioners were Alfred Deakin (formerly Australian prime minister) and Dugald Thomson (formerly the federal member for North Sydney).

In July 1915 the federal parliament passed legislation to conduct a collection of information that became known as the 'war census', to be supervised by Knibbs as the government statistician. The information to be collected was detailed in two schedules incorporated in the legislation. The first, to be completed by all males aged from eighteen to fifty-nine, requested personal information about each individual including health and occupation details, as well as whether any military training had been undertaken and details of any firearms and ammunition the person may possess. The second schedule, to be completed by both sexes aged eighteen and upwards who were possessed of property or in receipt of income, required the monetary values of such property and income. Those required to complete the census were instructed to obtain forms from post offices and railway stations and the collection of completed forms took place in the first half of September 1915. In November 1915 Knibbs prepared a report for the Federal Parliamentary War Committee of Australian men (aged from eighteen to forty-four) who were fit for military service, based on the data collected in the war census. It was estimated there were approximately six hundred thousand eligible men in Australia. Based on Knibbs' report the committee decided to attempt to bolster recruitment efforts in order to increase the strength of the Australian Imperial Force (AIF) to three hundred thousand by June 1916. In December 1917 Knibbs chaired a conference dealing with the question of training and employment of returned soldiers who had been blinded in the war.

In 1919 Knibbs chaired a royal commission to investigate the federal taxation of leasehold estates in crown lands. The other appointed commissioners were Harris A. G. Curry (president of the Land Appeal Court of New South Wales) and H. O. Allan (an official in the Victorian Lands Department).

Knibbs left Melbourne for London in early August 1919 to attend the Imperial Statisticians' Conference. Prior to the conference he held talks with various British government officials on subjects such as the double taxation of income and the distribution of war profits. The Imperial Statisticians' Conference was held in London in January and February 1920, during which it was proposed to establish a statistical bureau for the entire British Empire. In October 1920 it was announced that Knibbs had been nominated as vice-president of the Second International Eugenics Congress, to be held in New York in September 1921.

The publication of the Official Year Book of the Commonwealth of Australia by the Bureau of Census and Statistics became a regular annual feature after the initial volume was issued in 1908. The publications became renowned for their quality and were so closely associated with the oversight and guidance of the commonwealth statistician that the annual series of information and statistics on Australia became colloquially known as 'Knibbs'. The last publication prepared entirely under Knibbs' management was the 1920 Official Year Book, the thirteenth in the series released in November 1920.^{[B]}

=== Institute of Science and Industry ===
In March 1921 Knibbs was appointed director of the newly established Institute of Science and Industry. The appointment by the federal government was for a period of five years at an annual salary of two thousand pounds, thus becoming one of the highest-paid public servants in Australia. His appointment as director "had come as a surprise to many people", not only because he seemed firmly entrenched as Commonwealth Statistician, but also because he was sixty-two years of age. Knibbs exercised oversight of the industrial research work of the institute, including measures to increase pastoral production and the eradication of pest species.

Under Knibbs' direction the Institute of Science and Industry began the work of national standardisation of materials, especially of engineering materials. In July 1921 Knibbs announced the adoption of Australian standards for steel sections and rails and fishplates for tramways and railways. From 1922 to 1926 Knibbs was chairman of the board of the Australian Commonwealth Engineering Standards Association.

In 1921 Knibbs presided over the social and statistical section of the conference of the Australasian Association for the Advancement of Science. In 1923 and 1924 he served as president of the Australasian Association for the Advancement of Science.

Knibbs was conferred as a Knight Bachelor in the 1923 Birthday Honours.

Knibbs joined the board of directors of The Colonial Mutual Life Assurance Society Ltd. in February 1926.

In February 1926 Knibbs tendered his resignation as director of the Institute of Science and Industry and retired on 17 March 1926 after a period of leave. He had been suffering from ill-health prior to his resignation. In a statement made when his retirement was announced, Knibbs stated that the Institute of Science and Industry, although hampered by a paucity of government funding, had achieved much: "The investigation and research work which we have been able to accomplish with the limited funds available have already saved Australia many millions of pounds". He cited as examples the successful control measures for prickly pear and advances in the manufacture of paper pulp.

=== Later years ===
In October 1928 Knibbs published The Shadow of the World's Future, published by Ernest Benn Ltd. in London. In his later years Knibbs had embraced a doctrine which he called the "new Malthusianism" which postulated that, at prevailing growth rates, the world would reach human capacity in about two hundred and fifty years. Although he advocated an increased population for Australia as necessary for self-preservation, but warned against indiscriminate immigration.

Sir George H. Knibbs died on 30 March 1929 at his home in Sunnyside Avenue, in the inner Melbourne suburb of Camberwell, aged 70. He had been ill for several weeks prior to his death.

== Publications ==
George Handley Knibbs (author)

- Book I: Voices of the North and Book II: Echoes of Hellas (1913), London: Alston Rivers Ltd.
- The Shadow of the World's Future, or the Earth's Population Possibilities & the Consequences of the Present Rate of Increase of the Earth's Inhabitants (1928), London: Ernest Benn Ltd.

Government publications

- G. H. Knibbs & J. W. Turner (1903) Interim Report of the Commissioners on Certain Parts of Primary Education, Commission on Primary, Secondary, Technical, and Other Branches of Education, Sydney: William Applegate Gullick, Government Printer.
- G. H. Knibbs & J. W. Turner (1905) Report of the Commissioners on Agricultural, Commercial, Industrial, and other forms of Technical Education, Commission on Primary, Secondary, Technical, and Other Branches of Education, Sydney: William Applegate Gullick, Government Printer.
- G. H. Knibbs (September 1910), Social Insurance (Report by the Commonwealth Statistician, G. H. Knibbs to the Honourable F. G. Tudor, M.P., Minister of State for Trade and Customs), Commonwealth Bureau of Census and Statistics, Melbourne: J. Kemp, Government Printer.
- G. H. Knibbs (October 1910), Superannuation (Report by G. H. Knibbs, Commonwealth Statistician), Melbourne: J. Kemp, Government Printer.
- G. H. Knibbs (December 1911), Inquiry into the Cost of Living in Australia 1910-11, Commonwealth Bureau of Census and Statistics, Melbourne: McCarron, Bird & Co.
- G. H. Knibbs (April 1913), Trade Unionism, Unemployment, Wages, Prices, and Cost of Living in Australia, 1891 to 1912 (Prepared under Instructions from the Hon. King O'Malley, M.P., Minister of State for Home Affairs, by G. H. Knibbs, Commonwealth Statistician), Commonwealth Bureau of Census and Statistics, Melbourne: McCarron, Bird & Co.
- G. H. Knibbs (1913), Old-Age and Invalid Pension (Report on the extent of granting of in Australia by G. H. Knibbs, Commonwealth Statistician), Melbourne: Albert J. Mullett, Government Printer.
- G. H. Knibbs (1915), The Australian Commonwealth: Its Resources and Production (Published under the authority of the Minister of State for External Affairs, by G. H. Knibbs, Commonwealth Statistician), Commonwealth Bureau of Census and Statistics, Melbourne: McCarron, Bird & Co.
- G. H. Knibbs (February 1918), The Private Wealth of Australia and Its Growth as ascertained by various methods, together with A Report of the War Census of 1915 (Prepared under instructions from the Minister of State for Home and Territories by G. H. Knibbs, Commonwealth Statistician), Commonwealth Bureau of Census and Statistics, Melbourne: McCarron, Bird & Co.
- G. H. Knibbs (December 1918), Price-Indexes, their Nature and Limitations, the Technique of Computing them, and their Application in Ascertaining the Purchasing-Power of Money (Prepared under instructions from the Minister of State for Home and Territories by G. H. Knibbs, Commonwealth Statistician), Commonwealth Bureau of Census and Statistics, Melbourne: McCarron, Bird & Co.

== See also ==
- Australian Statistician
- 1911 Australian census

== Notes ==
A.John William Turner (14 May 1849 – 24 July 1913) was a teacher, headmaster and administrator in the Department of Public Instruction. He was headmaster for fifteen years of the Fort Street Model Public School at Millers Point, Sydney, from 1889 to 1905. In 1902 and 1903 he and George Knibbs were Education Commissioners, sent to Europe and America "to report as to the latest educational methods". In 1905 and 1906 Turner was an assistant under-secretary in the Department of Public Instruction and from 1907 until his death in 1913 he held the position of Superintendent of Technical Education.

B.The compiling of the fourteenth Official Year Book of the Commonwealth of Australia, for publication in late 1921, was commenced under Knibbs' guidance, but after his appointment in March 1921 as director of the Institute of Science and Industry the editorial task was completed by John Stonham. The fifteen volume, released in late 1922, was prepared under the oversight of Knibbs' successor as federal statistician, Charles H. Wickens, and edited by Stonham.
