= I Wayan Arka =

Indonesian-Balinese linguist

- ᬇᬯᬬᬦ᭄ᬅᬃᬓ
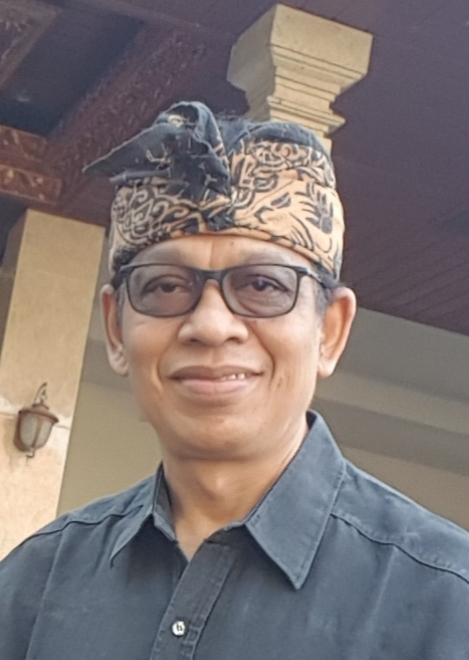
- Born: 1962 (age 63–64); Bali, Indonesia
- Citizenship: Indonesian
- Occupation: Linguist
- Awards: Fellow of the Academy of the Social Sciences in Australia; Fellow of the Australian Academy of the Humanities

Academic background
- Education: English linguistics; TESOL; Linguistics
- Thesis: From morphosyntax to pragmatics in Balinese
- Doctoral advisor: William A. Foley; Jane Simpson

Academic work
- Discipline: Linguistics
- Sub-discipline: Linguistic description, Language documentation, Linguistic typology, Theoretical linguistics, Formal linguistics, Computational linguistics.
- Institutions: The Australian National University / Udayana University
- Website: https://researchers.anu.edu.au/researchers/arka-iww

I Wayan Arka (Balinese: ᬇᬯᬬᬦ᭄ᬅᬃᬓ) FASSA FAHA (born 1962) is an Indonesian-Balinese linguist, lecturer, scholar and researcher at Udayana University (UNUD) in Bali, Indonesia and the Australian National University (ANU) in Canberra, Australia.

Arka completed his Bachelor of Arts with a major in English Linguistics at Udayana University in Bali, Indonesia in 1985 before completing his Master of Arts in Teaching English as a second or foreign language (TESOL) / Applied Linguistics at Hasanuddin University, Indonesia in 1990. He moved to Sydney, Australia in 1995 to complete his Master of Philosophy with a specialisation in linguistics. Arka obtained his Doctor of Philosophy at the University of Sydney in 1999.

Arka is currently a professor of linguistics at the School of Culture, History & Language (CHL) of the College of Asia & the Pacific (CAP), ANU (2007–present), a lecturer at UNUD (1985–present) and invited visiting scholar at the Faculty of Linguistics, Philology and Phonetics, University of Oxford (2019–present).

== Research Interests ==
Arka specialises in Austronesian and Papuan languages of Indonesia. His research spans various sub-disciplines of linguistics, including linguistic description, language documentation, linguistic typology, theoretical linguistics, formal linguistics and computational linguistics.

Arka works with indigenous minority communities across Indonesia, including Papua, to explore new ways of documenting languages, gain an understanding of the complexity of language endangerment and produce insights into linguistics and related disciplines to advance the new and emerging field of language documentation or documentary linguistics. His contribution to this field includes a new model of language management that can account for complex issues of language policy affecting the maintenance of indigenous minority languages in Indonesia.

Arka has carried out language documentation in Merauke, Indonesia and is currently working on the Enggano language, an endangered language on the island of Enggano, southwest of Bengkulu, Sumatra based on a grant from the Endangered Language Fund and an AHRC grant.

== Awards and honors ==
In 2021, Arka was elected a fellow of the Academy of the Social Sciences in Australia.

In 2022, Arka was elected a fellow of the Australian Academy of Humanities.

== Selected works ==
- Arka, I Wayan, Ash Asudeh and Tracy Holloway-King (eds). 2021. Modular Design of Grammar: linguistics on the edge. Oxford: Oxford University Press.
- Arka, I Wayan. 2017. The core-oblique distinction in some Austronesian languages of Indonesia and beyond. Linguistik Indonesia 35(2): 100–142
- Arka, I Wayan, and Mary Dalrymple. 2017. Nominal, pronominal, and verbal number in Balinese. Linguistic Typology. 21(2): 261–331
- Arka, I W. 2014. Locatives and the argument-adjunct distinction in Balinese. Linguistic Discovery no. 12(2): 56-84
- Arka, I W. 2013. Language management and minority language maintenance in Indonesia: Strategic issues. Language Documentation Conservation, 7:74-105
- Arka, I W. 2011. Constructive number systems in Marori and beyond. In Butt, M. and King, T.H. (eds), Proceedings of the International Lexical Functional Grammar (LFG2011) conference, 5-25. The University of Hong Kong, Hong Kong, 19 July 2011: CSLI
- Arka, I W. 2003. Balinese morphosyntax: a lexical-functional approach. Canberra: Pacific Linguistics
