= David Gruen (economist) =

Australian statistician

David Gruen AO FASSA
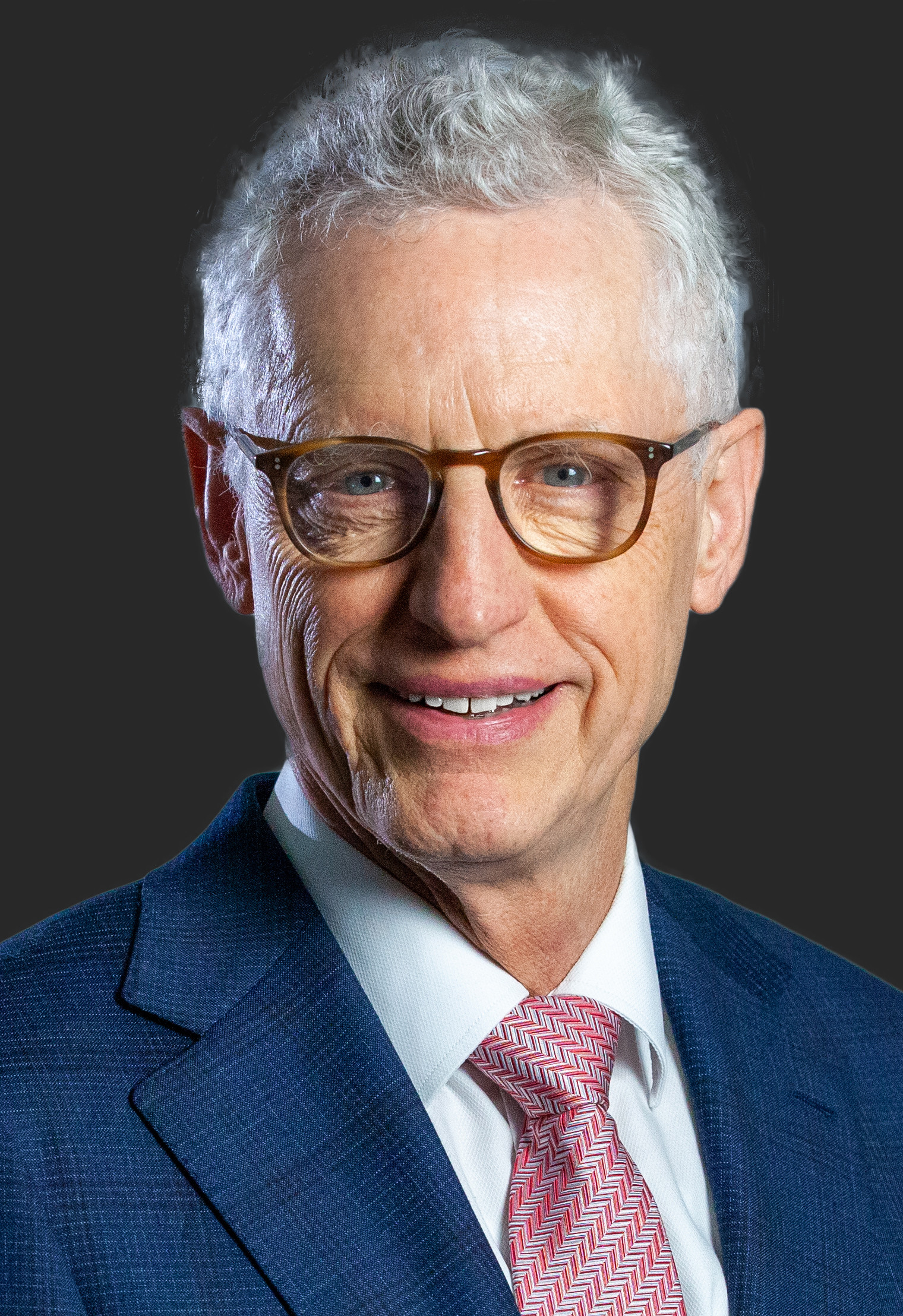

15th Australian Statistician
- Incumbent
- Assumed office 11 December 2019
- Appointed by: Scott Morrison
- Monarchs: Elizabeth II; Charles III
- Preceded by: David Kalisch

Personal details
- Born: David William Gruen; 31 August 1954 (age 71) Sydney, Australia
- Children: 1
- Parent: Fred Gruen
- Education: Monash University (BSc), University of Cambridge (PhD), The Australian National University (PhD)
- Profession: Statistician, mathematician

David William Gruen AO FASSA (born 31 August 1954) is an Australian statistician and mathematician. He is the current Australian Statistician at the Australian Bureau of Statistics serving since 11 December 2019. He previously served as Deputy Secretary, Economic and Australia's G20 Sherpa at the Department of the Prime Minister and Cabinet. He previously held office as the executive director of the Macroeconomic group of Australian Treasury and was the head of the Economic Research Department of the Reserve Bank of Australia from 1998 to 2002.

Gruen was appointed an Officer of the Order of Australia in the 2022 Australia Day Honours. He was elected a Fellow of the Academy of the Social Sciences in Australia in 2023.

Government offices
Preceded by David Kalisch	Australian Statistician; 2019–present	Incumbent
