= George Philippidis =

American renewable energy researcher

Dr. George Philippidis
- Education: B.S. Chemical Engineering; Ph.D. Chemical Engineering; MBA
- Occupation(s): Associate Dean and Associate Professor

Dr. George Philippidis is a renewable energy and sustainability leader, who has published and spoken extensively about the global need for renewable energy as the foundation of a green economy and a sustainable society. He advocates the development of renewable power and fuels to enhance energy security, combat climate change, and secure sustainable economic growth. He has authored 11 cleantech patents, written numerous articles, and spoken nationally and internationally emphasizing that renewable energy can initially supplement and augment current resources and progressively replace fossil energy based on its own merits rather than on government policy.

== Biography ==
Dr. Philippidis is a Fulbright Specialist Scholar. He received a B.S. in Chemical Engineering from the Aristotle University of Thessaloniki in Macedonia, Greece and a Ph.D. in Chemical Engineering from the University of Minnesota in Minneapolis-St. Paul. He also obtained a Master's in Business Administration (MBA) from the University of Denver. He led strategic business units at the National Renewable Energy Laboratory (NREL) of the US Department of Energy in Denver and at a subsidiary of Thermo Fisher Scientific in Boston before becoming Energy Director of the Applied Research Center, the business arm of Florida International University in Miami. Presently, he is Associate Dean for Research and Associate Professor and Director of the Biofuels & Bioproducts Lab at the Patel College of Global Sustainability at the University of South Florida in Tampa, where he directs applied research, partners with companies and venture capital firms to commercialize renewable energy technologies, and educates students and professionals in energy sustainability.

He has been advising the federal and state governments on energy policy and transition to a bioeconomy, venture capital and private equity firms on investment in cleantech, and the private sector in the United States, Latin America, and Europe on the establishment of renewable power and fuel industries.
