= Australian Bureau of Statistics =

Australian statistics and census agency

Agency overview
- Formed: 8 December 1905; 120 years ago
- Preceding agency: Commonwealth Bureau of Census and Statistics
- Jurisdiction: Australian Government
- Headquarters: Canberra, Australian Capital Territory
- Employees: 3663 (at 30 June 2024)
- Annual budget: AU$172.7 million (over four years from 2023–24)
- Minister responsible: Jim Chalmers, Treasurer
- Agency executives: David Gruen, Australian Statistician; Brenton Goldsworthy, Deputy Australian Statistician, Insights and Statistics Group; Phillip Gould, Deputy Australian Statistician, Data and Statistical Practices Group; Kylie Bryant, Deputy Australian Statistician, Enterprise Services Group
- Parent department: Treasury
- Website: abs.gov.au

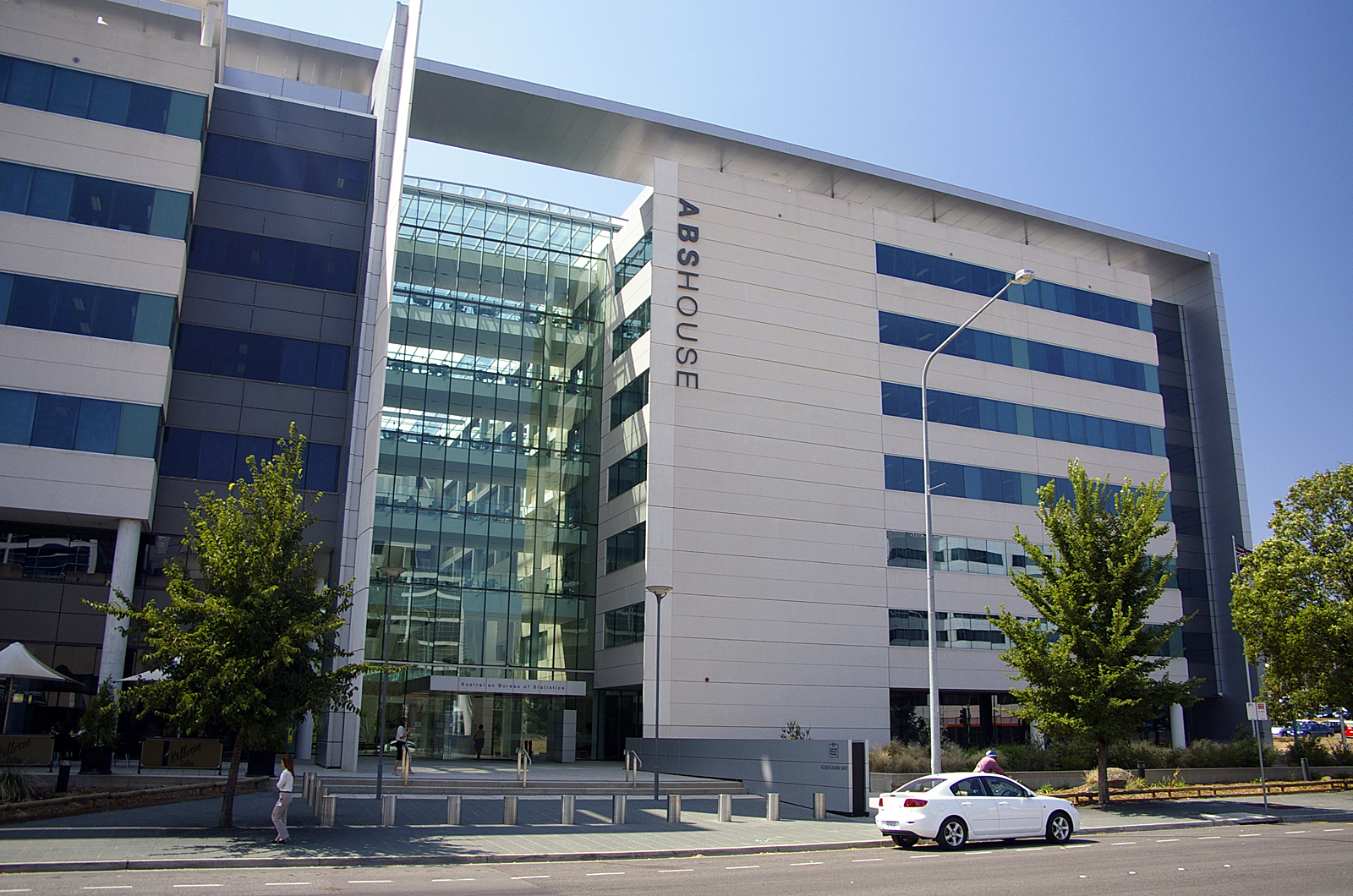
The ABS House in Canberra

The Australian Bureau of Statistics (ABS) is an agency of the Australian Government that collates and analyses statistical data on economic, demographic, environmental and social issues to support policy research and development.

The bureau's function originated in the Commonwealth Bureau of Census and Statistics, established in 1905, four years after the Federation of Australia. The organisation took on its present name in 1975. The ABS conducts Australia's Census of Population and Housing every five years and publishes its findings online.

== History ==
Efforts to count the population of Australia started in 1795 with "musters" that involved physically gathering a community to be counted, a practice that continued until 1825. The first colonial censuses were conducted in New South Wales in 1828; in Tasmania in 1841; South Australia in 1844; Western Australia in 1848; and Victoria in 1854. Each colony continued to collect statistics separately despite attempts to coordinate collections through an annual Conference of Statisticians. The first simultaneous census across all the Australian colonies occurred in 1881. A national statistical office was subsequently proposed to develop comparable statistics.

The Commonwealth Bureau of Census and Statistics (CBCS) was established under the Census and Statistics Act 1905. Sir George Handley Knibbs was appointed as the first Commonwealth Statistician. The bureau was located in Melbourne – at that time the temporary seat of federal government – attached to the Department of Home Affairs. In 1928, the bureau relocated to Canberra, where in 1932 it was subsumed within the Department of the Treasury.

The first national census, which deployed about 7300 collectors, occurred in 1911. Although coordination and data sharing were facilitated by CBCS, each state in Australia initially had its own statistical office and worked with the CBCS to produce national data. Some states faced challenges in providing a satisfactory statistical service through their own offices, resulting in mergers with the CBCS. The Tasmanian Statistical Office was transferred to the CBCS in 1924, and the New South Wales Bureau of Statistics amalgamated into it in 1957. The final unification of all state statistical offices with the CBCS occurred in the late 1950s under the guidance of Sir Stanley Carver, who was the New South Wales Statistician acting as the Commonwealth Statistician.

In 1974, the CBCS was abolished and replaced by the Australian Bureau of Statistics (ABS). The Australian Bureau of Statistics Act 1975 established the ABS as a statutory authority headed by the Australian Statistician, who reported to the federal Treasurer.

In 2015, the Australian Government announced a $250 million five-year investment in the ABS to modernise its systems and processes.

== Census of population and housing ==
Once every 5 years, the ABS conducts the Australian Census of Population and Housing as stipulated under federal law in the Constitution of Australia. The most recent was conducted on 10 August 2021. Statistics from the census were published on the ABS website in June 2022.

The census aims to accurately measure the population, number of dwellings in Australia, and a range of their key characteristics. Census data is used for defining electoral boundaries, planning infrastructure, establishing community services, and formulating public policy.

=== 2016 census ===
In 2016, the ABS conducted its census largely online through its website and logins rather than through paper forms. The bureau took the form offline for 43 hours from 8:09 pm on 9 August until 2:29 pm on 11 August. On 10 August, the Australian Statistician, David Kalisch, stated that the website was closed after denial-of-service attacks from an overseas source targeted the online form; "the first three were successfully repelled and the fourth one caused the difficulty that then led us to bring the system down as a precaution". A comprehensive review by Alastair MacGibbon, Special Adviser to the Prime Minister on Cyber Security, tabled in October, concluded that five distributed denial-of-service attacks – in which incoming traffic from many different sources "floods" the site – had occurred. They had been much smaller than attacks experienced by other Australian Government websites and the preventable outages had resulted from a failed geoblocking strategy, compounded by a hardware failure when the contractor, IBM, attempted to reboot the system after the fourth attack. There was no indication that the census data was insecure or was compromised. Many recommendations of the review included that the ABS should strengthen its approach to managing the performance of outsourced ICT suppliers and that the ABS "should draw upon the lessons it takes from the Census experience to help to guide and to advocate for the cultural change path it is following".

A Senate inquiry was held into the 2016 census, reporting in November and making 16 recommendations including externally conducted privacy impact assessments, engagement with the non-government sector, reporting breaches of census-related data, open tendering, and stability in funding the bureau. An independent panel was also established by the Australian Statistician to help to ensure the quality of the 2016 census.

=== 2021 census ===
The 2021 census was conducted during the height of the global COVID-19 pandemic. In obtaining data from 10,852,208 dwellings, it exceeded the ABS target. The dwelling response rate was 96.1%, an increase from 95.1% in 2016.

== Publications ==
The ABS publishes monthly and quarterly economic information spanning interest rates, property prices, employment, the value of the Australian dollar, and commodity prices. Publications include things such as: the Key Economic Indicators, Consumer Price Index, Australian National Accounts, Average Weekly Earnings, and Labour Force.

=== Other major publications ===
Outside the main economic indicators, the ABS has several other major publications covering topics including:

- Health: The 2011–12 Australian Health Survey was a survey on health and wellbeing conducted in Australia. The survey included a biomedical component with respondents having the option of providing biomedical samples such as blood and urine for testing. This allowed the survey to capture detailed health information about health conditions in the community. A secondary component of the Australian Health Survey asked respondents to keep a food diary, which was used to obtain a view of the nutritional intake and dietary preferences of the nation.
- Crime: The ABS publishes crime statistics such as individual releases covering offenders, victims of crime, the corrections system and prisons. The Australian crime rate statistic for 2021 was 0.74, a 13.51% decline from 2020.
- Demography: The ABS publishes many demographic releases including data on population, population growth and projections, interstate and overseas migration, births, deaths and overseas arrivals and departures.
- Aboriginal and Torres Strait Islander statistics: The National Aboriginal and Torres Strait Islander Social Survey (NATSISS) collects information on the social situation of Indigenous Australians, including data on health, education, culture, and labour force participation. The ABS also collects data related to Aboriginal and Torres Strait Islanders through the Australian Health Survey as well as in many other regular publications in the areas of demography, education, employment, and more.
- Education: The major education publications are Childhood Education and Care, Schools, and Education and Work. They look at all aspects of education in Australia from preschool up to undergraduate and postgraduate study.
- Environment: The ABS has publications on environmental topics covering energy and water use, conservation activities undertaken by households, land management, farming, and more.
- Research and Innovation: The ABS has been undertaking surveys to collect estimates from Australian organisations regarding expenditure on and human resources devoted to research and development (R&D) in Australia since 1978. The results allow the nature and distribution of Australia's R&D activity to be monitored by government policy analysts and advisers to government, businesses, and economists.

In August 2017, the Treasurer issued a directive to the ABS to undertake a statistical collection into the views of Australians on the electoral roll about same-sex marriage. This is now referred to as the Australian Marriage Law Postal Survey.

The ABS previously published the Yearbook Australia, from 1908 to 2012 under various ISSNs and titles (Commonwealth yearbook, Official yearbook of the Commonwealth of Australia).

The ABS publishes an annual report with a detailed description of the bureau's activities during the preceding year, accounting for its use of public resources and performance against planned outcomes.

== The Australian Statistical Geography Standard ==
The ABS maintains the Australian Statistical Geography Standard (ASGS), a system of geographic statistical areas in Australia. The ASGS includes geographic structures created and maintained by the ABS, as well as structures defined by other bodies but which the ABS uses for reporting statistical information.

The ABS structures within the ASGS include a Main Structure, which is a nested hierarchy of geographic areas ranging from very small units to the whole of Australia.

There are other ABS structures that are schemes with specific uses. They are built from units of the Main Structure, or smaller units in the same structure. Examples include the Indigenous Structure, a structure for urban areas, and the Remoteness Structure.

For all the ABS structures, all geographic units at a given level of the structure cover the whole of Australia without gaps or overlaps, though this sometimes involves defining units, such as 'Remainder of State/Territory (<state>)' in the Urban Centres and Localities level of the Urban Areas structure, to ensure complete geographic coverage.

The non-ABS structures within the ASGS have geographical units whose boundaries are defined by bodies such as state governments, and that may or may not cover the whole of Australia without gaps or overlaps. Examples include electoral divisions, Postal Areas, and Suburbs and Localities. The boundaries of these units are approximated in the ASGS so they match boundaries in the ABS Main Structure.

The current version of the ASGS is Version 4 of 2026.

=== ABS Structures ===
These structures within the ASGS are defined by the ABS.

	Abbreviation	Description	Built from	Geographically Complete
Main Structure
Mesh Block	MB	Mesh Blocks are the smallest defined areas in the ASGS, and reflect a single dominant land use where possible. All other ASGS areas are built up from mesh blocks. Residential and similar mesh blocks where possible contain between 30 and 60 dwellings. Non-residential mesh blocks (e.g.: commercial, parkland, transport, agriculture) generally have a zero or close-to-zero population count. The only statistics the ABS provides for mesh blocks are the total population and the total dwelling count.		Yes
Statistical Area 1	SA1	Populated SA1s generally have a population of 200 to 800 people, and are designed to maximise the spatial detail of census data without compromising confidentiality. Urban SA1s have a population density of more than 200 inhabitants per square kilometre (520/sq mi), or built infrastructure and other land uses surrounded by urban area. Rural SA1s have less than 200 inhabitants per square kilometre (520/sq mi), or contain other rural or natural areas, and are generally internally connected by road transport.	MB	Yes
Statistical Area 2	SA2	SA2s are designed to represent a single community. They generally have a population of between 3,000 and 25,000 - though populations may be smaller in sparse, geographically diverse areas, or larger in order to contain all of a large suburb or regional town. They are the smallest units for which the ABS reports non-census data, and are also the smallest areas (in the Main Structure) that are named.	SA1	Yes
Statistical Area 3	SA3	SA3s are designed to represent meaningful regional areas, either the functional area (Note: Functional Areas include populations of and around cities and larger regional towns who travel to the town for work, socialising or services.) around a city or town, or related suburbs clustered around urban commercial or transport hubs. They generally have populations between 30,000 and 130,000.	SA2	Yes
Statistical Area 4	SA4	SA4s represent labour markets, including areas around employment hubs within (or sub-divisions of) the larger capital cities, and the travel to work patterns around larger regional towns. Outer regional and remote SA4s represent aggregations of smaller labour markets. SA4s are the largest sub-state regions in the Main Structure, and are intended to be stable over time, to allow accurate time series in labour force data. They generally have populations of about 100,000 to 300,000 in regional areas, and between 300,000 and 500,000 in cities.	SA3	Yes
States and Territories	S/T	The States and Territories represent the legal entities, with the Other Territories (Jervis Bay Territory, and the Territories of Christmas Island, Cocos (Keeling) Islands and Norfolk Island) included as a single area.	SA4	Yes
Australia	AUS	Statistics for the whole of the geographic definition of Australia are reported at this level.	S/T	Yes
Greater Capital City Statistical Area	GCCSA	GCCSAs represent the functional areas of each of the capital cities, as well as regions for the rest of each state or territory (except the ACT, which is a single GCCSA), and a region for the Other Territories.	SA4	Yes
Indigenous Structure
Indigenous Location	ILOC	ILOCs represent small indigenous communities who share location, language, traditional borders or Native Title. With a minimum of about 90 people, they are designed to allow analysis of small areas without losing individual confidentiality. ILOCS may also represent larger areas with a more dispersed indigenous population.	SA1	Yes
Indigenous Area	IARE	IAREs are medium-sized geographic areas that represent larger indigenous populations than ILOCs, and therefore allow the release of more detailed economic and population statistics.	ILOC	Yes
Indigenous Region	IREG	IREGs combine one or more IAREs, with boundaries based originally on the former Aboriginal and Torres Strait Islander Commission boundaries (no longer maintained). Jervis Bay and Norfolk Island are each represented by individual Indigenous Regions, while Christmas Island and Cocos (Keeling) Islands are combined into a single IREG.	IARE	Yes
Urban Areas Structure (referred to in the ASGS as 'Significant Urban Areas, Urban Centres and Localities, Section of State')
Urban Centres and Localities	UCL	UCLs are areas of concentrated urban development, consisting of adjoining Mesh Blocks that meet population density criteria or contain urban infrastructure. Urban Centres have a 'core population' of 1,000 or more, while Urban Localities (Note: The distinction between Localities in UCLs and Localities in the SAL structure needs to be recognised. In UCLs, an (urban) locality is an area of urban character (ie: meeting certain population- or dwelling-density criteria, or containing urban infrastructure). In the SAL structure a locality is any SAL unit that is not within a city or large town - SAL localities may be partly or entirely rural in character.) generally have a population between 200 and 999. There is also a single UCL in each state or territory called 'Remainder of State/Territory (<S/T name>)' which combines all rural areas.	MB	Yes
Section of State Range	SOSR	SOSR categorises UCLS based on their population size. There are 11 categories, ranging from UCLs with a population of 1 million or more, down to UCLS with 499 or less, and a category containing the Remainder of State/Territory UCLs.	UCL	Yes
Section of State	SOS	SOS categorises UCLS based on their UCL class (Urban Centre or Locality) and population size. There are only 4 categories: Major Urban - Urban Centres with population 100,000 or more; Other Urban - Urban Centres with population 99,999 or less; Bounded Locality - all UCL Localities; Rural Balance - the Remainder of State/Territory UCLs.	UCL	Yes
Significant Urban Areas	SUA	SUAs are Urban Centres (or combinations of Urban Centres) that contain a population of 10,000 or more. SUAs may cross state and territory boundaries, and those that are combinations of Urban Centres are named after either those centres or have a region name. All SA2s are either included in an SUA, or combined into a Not in any Significant Urban Area region for each state and territory.	SA2	Yes
Remoteness Structure
Remoteness Structure	RA	The Remoteness Structure defines Remoteness Areas with various classes of remoteness for the whole of Australia. The five defined remoteness classes are: Major Cities, Inner Regional, Outer Regional, Remote, and Very Remote.	SA1	Yes

=== Non-ABS Structures ===
These structures are defined by bodies other than the ABS, though the ABS commits to providing a range of statistics for them. Where the legal or other boundaries of the geographical units within these structures don't exactly match mesh blocks boundaries, the ABS uses mesh block boundaries to approximate them; therefore the ASGS units should only be used for statistical purposes.

	Abbreviation	Description	Built from	Complete
Local Government Areas	LGA	LGAs are defined by state or territory governments. Areas outside incorporated local government bodies are consolidated into a single region in each state or territory.	MB	Yes
Postal Areas	POA	POAs are mesh block approximations of the postcode areas used by Australia Post (though Australia Post does not release detailed boundaries for its postcodes). Not all geographic postcodes have equivalent Postal Areas.	MB	Yes
Suburbs and Localities	SAL	SALs are mesh block approximations of the suburbs (in larger urban areas) and localities (outside these areas) which are defined and named by state & territory governments. Not all legally designated suburbs & localities have an equivalent SAL. SALs were known as State Suburbs (SSC) in the ASGS prior to version 3 (2021). (Note: The ABS explicitly does not define towns. It suggests using UCLs for urban areas with populations greater than 200 people, or SALs for smaller settlements.)	MB	Yes
State Electoral Divisions	SED	SEDs are mesh block approximations of state electoral districts defined by state or territory electoral commissions. For Victoria and Western Australia, lower house SEDs are named and coded with the upper house region they are in. For Tasmania, SEDs are defined for each combination of lower house region and upper house region that occurs.	MB	Yes
Commonwealth Electoral Divisions	CED	CEDs are mesh block approximations of Federal electoral divisions as defined by the Australian Electoral Commission (AEC). The Other Territories are included in electoral divisions in the states or territories that the AEC allocates them to.	MB	Yes
Destination Zones	DZN	DZNs are sub-divisions of SA2s designed for the analysis of Place of Work data from the census, and of commuting patterns. Although built from whole mesh blocks, and combined into SA2s, they do not necessarily align with SA1s.	MB	Yes

=== Editions ===
The ASGS was introduced by the ABS in 2011 as a replacement for the Australian Standard Geographical Classification (ASGC).

New editions essentially coincide with the 5-yearly ABS censuses, though boundary changes made to Non-ABS structures may be updated as often as annually.

The significant changes for Edition 2 (2016) included:

- addition of a boundary and code for the whole of Australia, and the inclusion of Norfolk Island
- non-ABS structures now primarily approximated by mesh blocks

The significant changes for Edition 3 (2021) included:

- introduction of Destination Zones to the Non-ABS structures
- removal of Natural Resource Management Regions
- electoral divisions, both commonwealth and state, are now approximated by mesh blocks
- the previous State Suburbs (SSCs) now called Suburbs and Localities (SALs)

The significant changes for Edition 4 (2026) included:

- Urban Centres and Localities are designed using Mesh Blocks (rather than Statistical Area Level 1 areas)
- removal of Australian Drainage Divisions and Tourism Regions from the Non ABS Structures
- digital boundary files will be released using the Geocentric Datum of Australia 2020 (GDA2020) - use of the Geocentric Datum of Australia 1994 (GDA94) has been discontinued

== International engagement ==
The ABS engages in international and regional statistical forums including the United Nations Statistical Commission (UNSC), the Organisation for Economic Cooperation and Development (OECD) Committee on Statistics and Statistical Policy (CSSP), and the United Nations Economic Commission for Europe (UNECE) Conference for European Statisticians (CES).

The ABS has a partnership with DFAT to deliver statistical and institutional capability building programs for the Indo-Pacific region, both in-country and by hosting development visits. The ABS has also hosted international development and study visits from countries including China, Japan, Canada, Korea, and Nepal.

== Australian Statistician ==
Since 1975, the head of the ABS has been known as the "Australian Statistician". The title has been previously known as the "Commonwealth Statistician".

The incumbent since 11 December 2019 is David Gruen. Previous incumbents have included David Kalisch and Brian Pink. Pink retired in January 2014. Ian Ewing acted in the role from 13 January to 14 February 2014, and Jonathan Palmer acted from 17 February to 12 December 2014.

== See also ==
- ANZSIC – Australian and New Zealand standard industrial classification, an industry classification developed jointly with Statistics New Zealand
- Demography of Australia
- SEIFA – Socio-economic indexes for areas, the Australian indexes of social advantage and disadvantage, created by the Australian Bureau of Statistics
- Census and Statistics Act 1905
