= Australian Statistician =

Head of the Australian Bureau of Statistics

The Australian Statistician is the head of the Australian Bureau of Statistics.

On 18 June 1906, the first Statistician of the Commonwealth of Australia was appointed to carry out the provisions of the Census and Statistics Act 1905. Later in the same year the Commonwealth Bureau of Census and Statistics was formed (renamed the Australian Bureau of Statistics in 1975).

Timothy Augustine Coghlan was offered the position in December 1905, but had to decline due to his obligations to the New South Wales government.

== Commonwealth Statisticians ==
- George Handley Knibbs (1906–1921)
- Charles Henry Wickens (August 1922 – April 1932, although Lyndhurst Falkiner Giblin was appointed acting Commonwealth Statistician following Wickens' stroke in 1931)
- Edward Tannock McPhee (1933–1936)
- Sir Roland Wilson (1936–1940; 1946–1951)
- Sir Stanley Roy Carver (acting from 1940 to 1946, and again from 1948 to 1951. Formally appointed Commonwealth Statistician from 20 August 1957 to 1961 or 6 February 1962)
- Keith Archer (1962–1970)
- Jack O'Neill (acting from 1969–1972. Commonwealth Statistician from 1972–1975)

== Australian Statisticians ==
- Robert William Cole 1976
- Roy James Cameron (1977 – 1985)
- Ian Castles (1986 – 1994)
- Bill McLennan (1995 – July 2000)
- Dennis Trewin (July 2000 – January 2007)
- Brian Pink (March 2007 – January 2014)
- David Kalisch (December 2014 – December 2019)
- David Gruen (December 2019 – present)
