= Statistics House =

Office building in Wellington, New Zealand

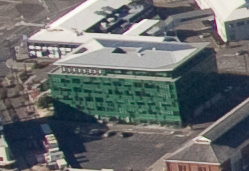
- Statistics house in 2010
- Interactive map of the Statistics House area

General information
- Location: Wellington, New Zealand
- Coordinates: 41°16′41″S 174°47′04″E
- Opened: 2005
- Demolished: 2018
- Owner: CentrePort Wellington

Statistics House was an office building on the waterfront of Wellington, New Zealand. It was built in 2005 as part of CentrePort's Harbour Quays Project and was the headquarters of Statistics New Zealand. The 2016 Kaikōura earthquake damaged the building and caused a partial collapse, which resulted in the building being demolished in 2018.

== Building ==
Statistics House, on the waterfront in Wellington, was built by the port company CentrePort as part of its Harbour Quays project. The Harbour Quays project was launched in July 2005 with the aim of developing CentrePort's land along Waterloo Quay, between Bunny St and the Sky Stadium, into a business park with office buildings, retail and recreational spaces. CentrePort said there was space for up to 12 multi-storey buildings to house 4000 workers. The first new building in the project was Statistics House, completed in 2005, followed by BNZ Harbour Quays in 2009.

The six-storey building was the headquarters of Statistics New Zealand, and housed a few other government departments as well as a cafe. About 500 people worked at the building for Statistics New Zealand.

== Earthquake, investigations and demolition ==
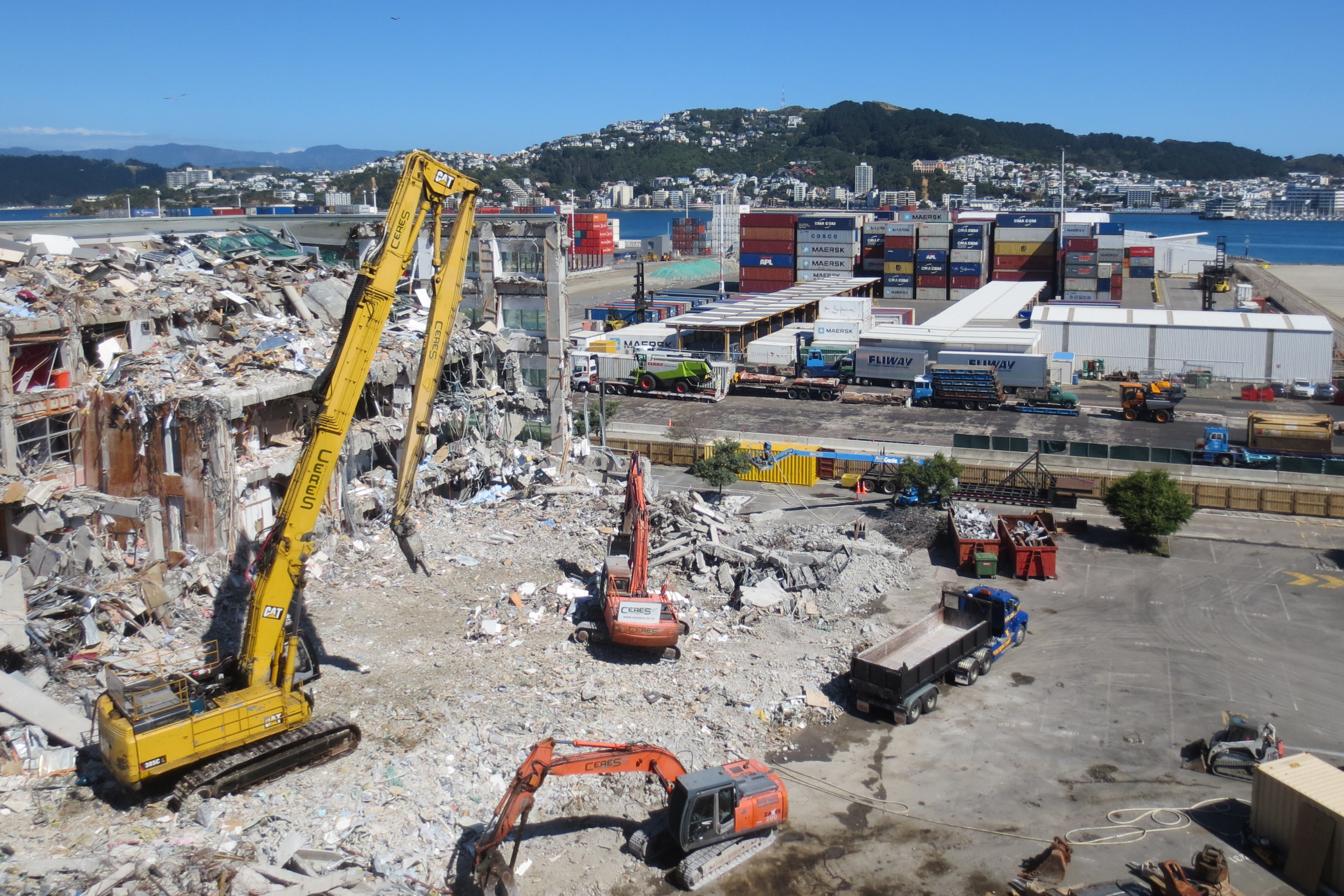
Statistics House being demolished in 2018

External image
- Result of the partial collapse on the ground floor

The 2013 Seddon earthquake caused water damage at Statistics House from burst and leaking pipes, but all of the building's floors were reopened within two weeks. The 2016 Kaikōura earthquake caused two concrete beams to disconnect from the building's outside wall, which caused a partial collapse of some of the ceilings. One "large beam" collapsed onto the ground floor. Nobody was inside the building when the earthquake struck, as the earthquake occurred two minutes past midnight. Statistics New Zealand chief executive Liz MacPherson was thankful for this, and questioned how such a new building could suffer damage to that extent. In 2017 Nick Smith, the Minister for Building and Construction, said that the damage was "unacceptable and could have caused fatalities".

A 2013 report made after the 2013 Seddon earthquake found that the building was 90 per cent of the new building standard, indicating that it was not earthquake prone as the percentage was above 34. 'Earthquake prone' is a term used to describe buildings that would be a hazard to people or other buildings in the event of a moderate earthquake. A Ministry of Business, Innovation and Employment inquiry into the building released in March 2017 also found that the building met the building code when it was built. However, the 2013 report found a flaw in the building: "The seating of floor units at the four corners of the building were identified as a critical element". Work to fix this problem started in September 2016, but it was not finished by the time the quake struck. Where the work was done, including partly, the earthquake did not cause any problems, but a partial collapse occurred where the upgrades had not been done. MacPherson said that she had not seen the 2013 report before the earthquake, and if she had, she might have ordered the upgrades to speed up.

After the earthquake occurred, the building was kept empty. In October 2017 insurers of the building decided to demolish it because a repair would not be economically feasible, and demolition started in late December 2017, with the expectation that it would be finished within two to three months. In April, the ministry started its engineering investigation again because during demolition, demolition engineers discovered that "the seating provided for some of the precast concrete floor units was less than what was shown on the original design documents", meaning that the building had not been built entirely to plan. The building standard required that this gap be at least 60mm, but the overlap in the actual building ranged from 38mm to 120mm, meaning that it did not meet the building code.

The 2017 inquiry resulted in four recommendations:

1. "Investigation of existing buildings in the Wellington region with a similar design that may have been damaged by the Kaikōura earthquake"
2. "Notify the industry about issues with existing buildings with pre-cast floor systems and frames that may be affected by beam elongation"
3. "Access technical expertise to consider the implications for this type of design for new buildings"
4. "Review and undertake research into the provisions in the Earthquake Actions standard to ensure they reflect current knowledge of earthquake engineering practise"

=== Effects on other buildings ===
In 2017, the Ministry of Business, Innovation and Employment started public consultation on a proposed ban on the type of floor supports used in the building that failed, known as loopbar floor supports or pigtails. In April 2018 the ministry warned engineers not to use this type of floor supports, and said that buildings with them would probably fail the building code. The Structural Engineers Society had also warned against using them in 2008. Wellington City Council later created a list of buildings that may have had a similar flaw to that of Statistics House. This list started out at 155 buildings but was reduced to "tens". One building that was closed due to this was the Wellington Central Library.

== See also ==
- 61 Molesworth Street, a Wellington building demolished after the 2016 earthquake
- BNZ Harbour Quays, a Wellington building demolished after the 2016 earthquake
