= 61 Molesworth Street =

Office building in Wellington, New Zealand

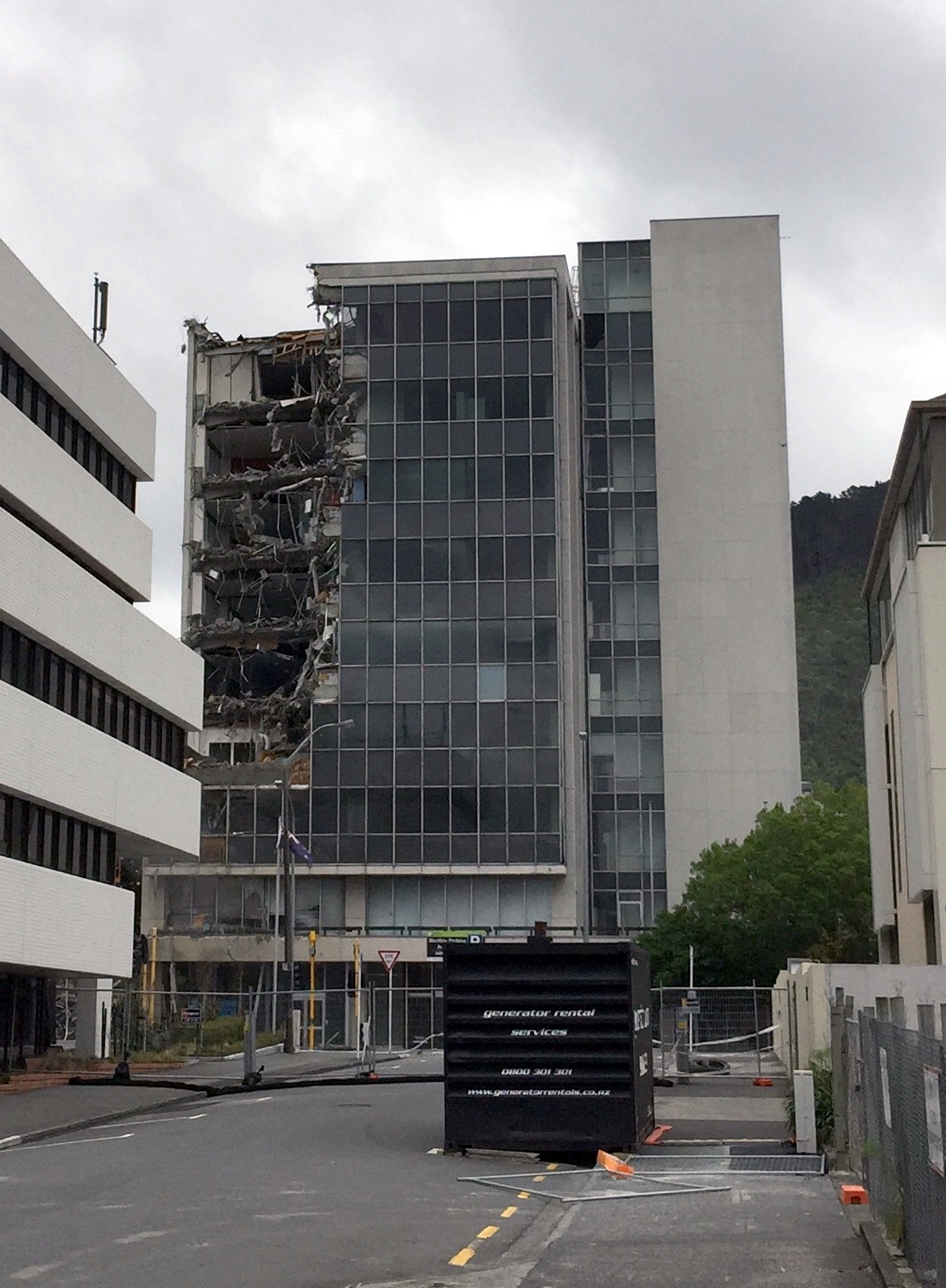
- The partially-demolished building in November 2016
- Interactive map of the 61 Molesworth Street area
- Former names: Deloitte House
- Alternative names: ICI House

General information
- Type: Office
- Architectural style: Modernist
- Location: 61 Molesworth Street, Wellington, New Zealand
- Coordinates: 41.2756°S 174.7775°E
- Year built: 1965
- Demolished: 2016–2017

Height
- Height: 40.5 metres (133 ft)

Technical details
- Floor count: 9–10

The former building at 61 Molesworth Street in Wellington, New Zealand, known as ICI House and later Deloitte House, was built in 1964 for the British chemical company Imperial Chemical Industries (ICI). It was made of two separate structures joined together with flexible joints and notable as an example of modernist architecture. The main structure was 9 storeys tall or 35 metres (115 ft) and the other, a service tower, was 10 storeys tall or 40.5 metres (133 ft). It was mainly used as an office building but also had shops at the bottom. It was damaged in the November 2016 Kaikōura earthquake and, due to concerns that it would collapse, was demolished from November 2016 to early 2017.

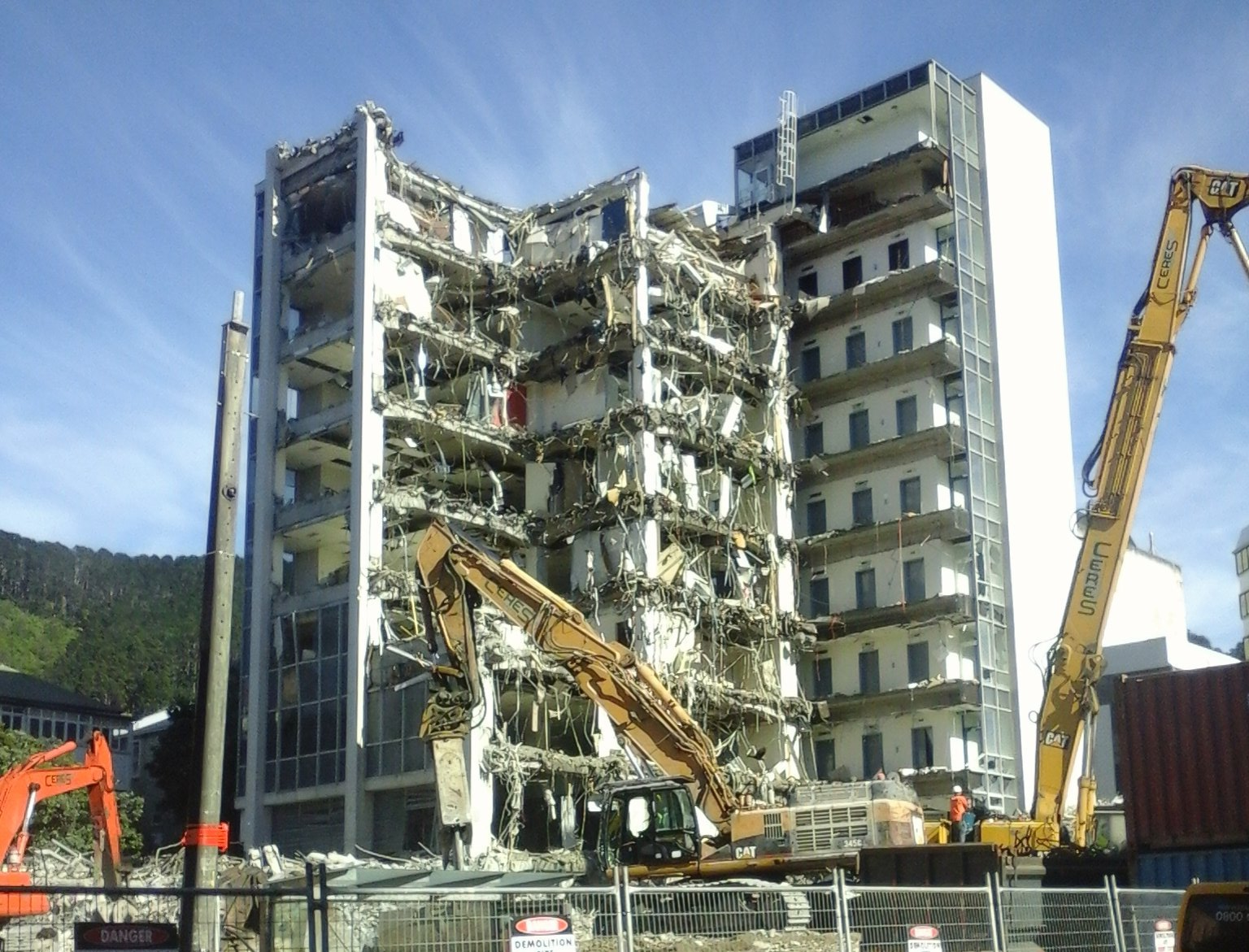
The building being demolished in December 2016

== Building ==
The building was designed by Stephenson & Turner and constructed by Fletcher Building for Imperial Chemical Industries (ICI) during 1962–1964. It was officially opened as ICI House on 4 December 1964. The office building in the modernist style was made of reinforced concrete with curtain walling, which allowed a lot of natural light into the interior and good views out over the city. It consisted of two separate structures with flexible joints between them. The main structure had 9 storeys and was 35 metres (115 ft) tall; the other, a service tower, had 10 storeys and was 40.5 metres (133 ft) tall.

During the design phase there was a lot of discussion between the Ministry of Works and Wellington City Council about the appearance of the future building, with concerns that it would overpower the neighbouring Wellington Cathedral of St Paul. Eventually they agreed to change the orientation of the building, making it seem narrower and making its glass walls reflect the cathedral. The building was higher than Wellington's height limit of 25.6 metres (84 ft) at the time of its construction, but Wellington City Council permitted an exemption to height limits because the building was carefully sited to prevent obstruction of sun and views from other buildings as much as possible.

On the ground floor of the main tower there were shops, and parking for six cars. The first floor contained parking for another 25 cars, accessed by a ramp, as well as a staff cafeteria with an outdoor terrace.

One wall in the foyer held a 7-metre-long concrete mural, titled Copper Crystals, made by Jim Allen. Allen has said that it was "inspired by the micro-structure of naturally occurring copper crystals, building blocks of the chemical industry". There were four shops at the bottom of the building before it was demolished. The service tower held three passenger lifts, stairs, toilets, machinery rooms and service ducts, and an enclosed observation gallery.

== History ==
Apart from the ICI offices, the first tenants in the building included two High Commissions and part of the Department of External Affairs. The building was promoted as being close to Parliament and the government administrative centre developed around Molesworth Street.

The building was known as Deloitte House from 1990 to 2005 after Deloitte Touche Tohmatsu leased the building in 1990. Deloittes moved out in 2005 and by 2007 the Inland Revenue Department leased all floors in the building. At this time it was announced that the building would have two floors added and be extended over a neighbouring carpark once the IRD lease ran out in 2009, but the project was later cancelled. In 2011, the building was bought by the property developer Eyal Aharoni.

=== 2016 Kaikōura earthquake ===
After the building, which had not been deemed earthquake-prone, was damaged in the 14 November 2016 Kaikōura earthquake, it was marked for demolition due to concerns that it would collapse in an aftershock. This was because a vertical support beam had been damaged and was reported to have an appearance "somewhat like a broken bone in the leg". Due to concerns about a collapse, the neighbouring buildings and homes were evacuated and a cordon was placed around the building. Wellington City Council managed the demolition, which was supposed to start a week later on 21 November but was delayed. Demolition was then set to start on 27 November, but could not proceed due to gale force winds. It instead began the next day. It was scheduled to be completed within two weeks, but more wind caused further delays.

At the time of the earthquake, at least six people were living illegally in the building, which was in a non-residential zone. The residents evacuated the building and left their personal belongings inside after the earthquake but were not allowed to retrieve them. While the rooms that had been lived in were being demolished, the belongings became visible from the outside. The council said during this time that they might attempt to remove some of the items using the demolition equipment, without entering the building. The residents said that they did not know that they were living in the building illegally. The owner of the building, Primeproperty Group, said that they had let the family live there in June 2016 because their previous residence had experienced water damage. Their tenancy was only temporary and the family was due to move out by 13 October. The group agreed that they should not have let the family live in the building. In June 2017 the Tenancy Tribunal of the Ministry of Business, Innovation and Employment required that Primeproperty return $6900 of rent and a $20 filing fee to the tenants and pay $600 worth of exemplary damages.

A timelapse video was made of the demolition. The site was returned to the owner in early February 2017.

Allen's Copper Crystals mural was saved during the demolition of the building. The mural was protected during the demolition process by a row of shipping containers and a reinforced concrete arch. It was then removed from the site and put into storage at Wellington City Council. As of May 2025, the mural was still in storage.

=== Replacement building ===
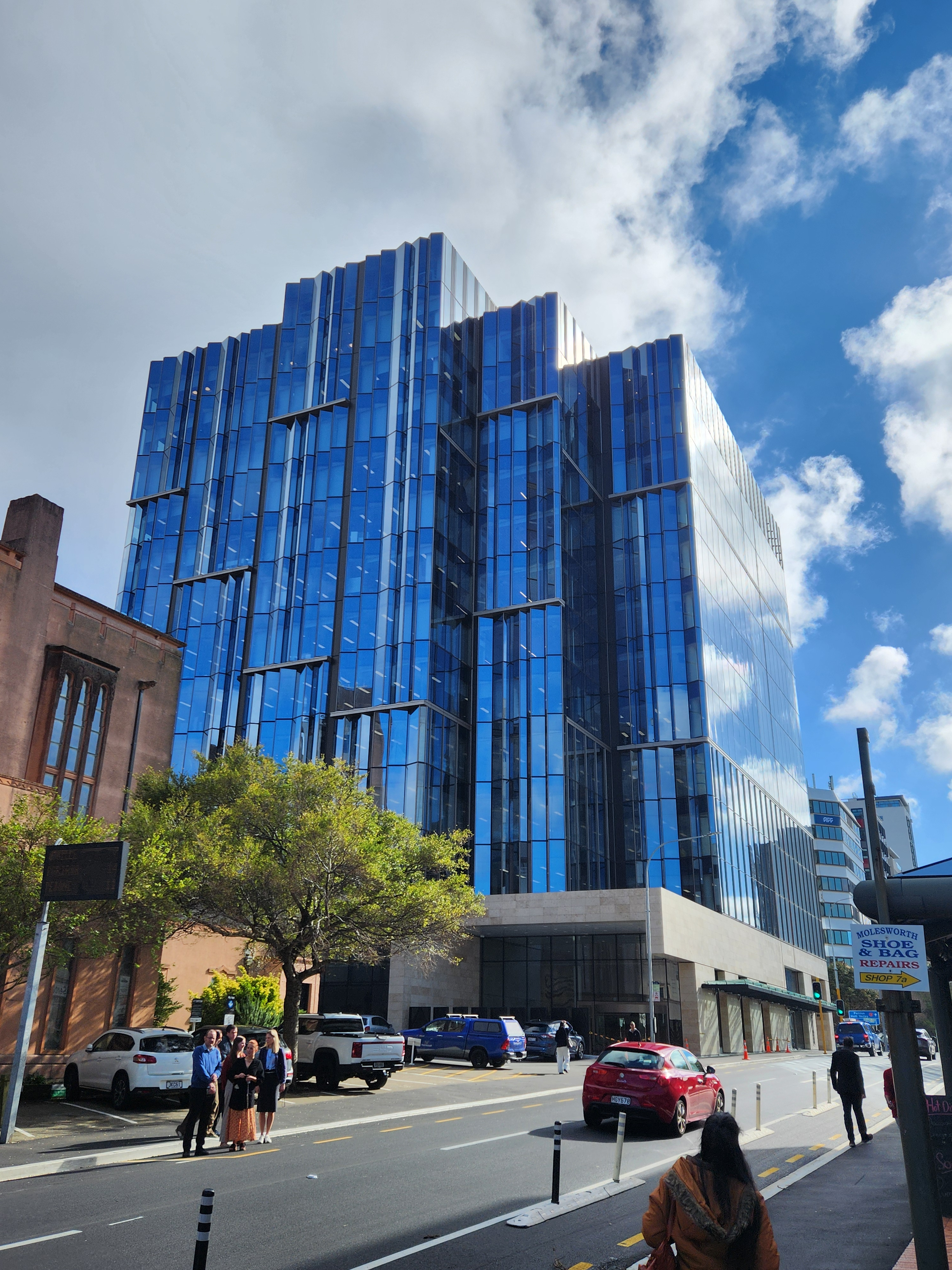
The replacement building in April 2026

After the building was demolished, the site was used as a car park. In November 2022, Precinct Properties New Zealand Limited announced that it had bought the property and would construct a new building on the site. The new building was completed in 2025 and as of 2026 houses the Ministry of Foreign Affairs and Trade, MetService, and Beca. The new building uses the address 55 Molesworth Street and is advertised as being "seismically resilient" and "environmentally-focused".

== See also ==
- Pringle House, an earthquake-damaged Wellington building that has also housed illegal occupants
- Statistics House, a Wellington building demolished after the 2016 earthquake
- BNZ Harbour Quays, a Wellington building demolished after the 2016 earthquake
