= Pringle House (New Zealand) =

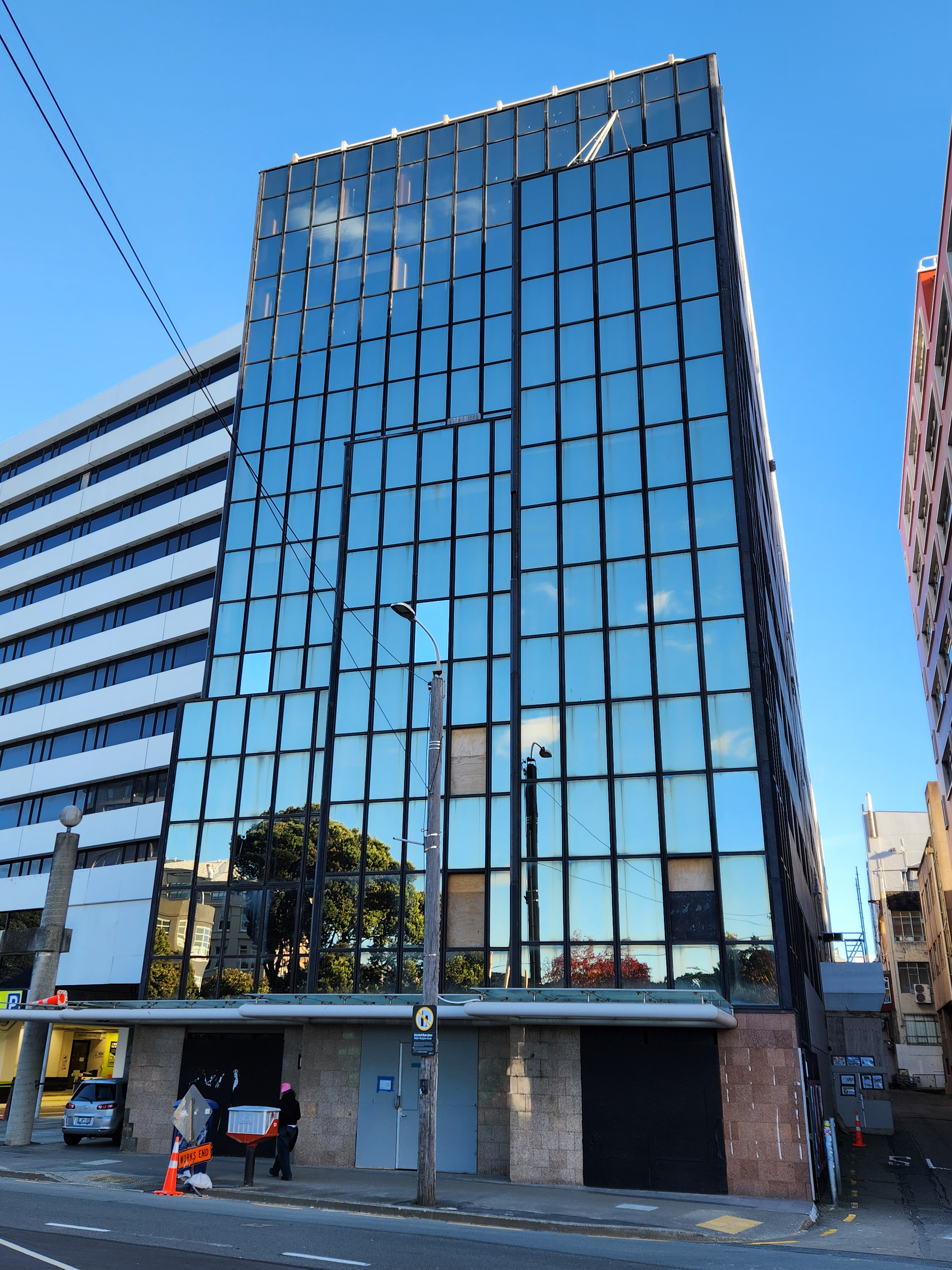
- Pringle House in May 2026
- Interactive map of the Pringle House area

General information
- Location: 142 Wakefield Street, Wellington, New Zealand
- Coordinates: 41°17′26″S 174°46′41″E
- Owner: Eyal Aharoni

Technical details
- Floor count: 10

Pringle House is a vacant building in Wellington, New Zealand. An earthquake-prone building, it was damaged in the 2013 Seddon earthquake and has since been empty. Pringle House was built in the late 1980s and bought by the Greater Wellington Regional Council bought it in 1987. The council sold it in 2015 to Eyal Aharoni.

== Building ==
Pringle House is ten storeys tall and is located at 142 Wakefield Street. As of 2025 the building is blocked off to prevent people from entering the building.

== History ==
Pringle House was built in the late 1980s. In 1987, the Greater Wellington Regional Council bought the building for $22 million ($45.2 million in 2014 dollars). After the collapse of the CTV Building in the 2011 Christchurch earthquake led to 115 deaths, buildings throughout the country were checked for non-ductile columns (i.e. columns that will not bend but only break), a feature that led to the CTV Building collapse. Pringle House was found to have non-ductile columns, as well as other flaws that inspectors considered serious, including foundations that were not designed to respond well to soil liquefaction (the soil under the building has "high potential" for liquefaction), piles that were lightly reinforced and, according to The Dominion Post, its "concrete floors were liable to fail in a major quake". This information led the regional council to decide in late 2012 that it would vacate the building. The council, however, was still using the building when the 2013 Seddon earthquake occurred, which damaged it. Damage included cracked shear walls and burst pipes, which led to five floors being flooded. The council then vacated the building and moved to Shed 39 on the waterfront.

In 2014, the earthquake-prone building was valued at $2.3 million, which would have represented a loss by the regional council of 95 per cent of its investment. In 2015, the property was valued at $3.2 million, which was no more than the value of the land. It was estimated that it would cost $5.2 million to bring the building up to 40 per cent of the New Building Standard (below 34% is considered earthquake-prone) and $32 million to bring it up to 100 per cent of the standard.

In 2015, the building was listed for sale by the regional council and it was bought by Eyal Aharoni, who also owned 61 Molesworth Street. After the November 2016 Kaikōura earthquake, the Wellington City Council reported that they had found evidence that Pringle House was being lived in about two months before the earthquake, despite it being condemned. In September the council received complaints about people living in the building, and people reported to The Dominion Post seeing what appeared to be about ten secondary school drop-outs living in the top floor and using it for parties. The council said, however, that it believed that no one was in the building when the earthquake struck.

Because people have been illegally entering the building, several methods have been used to prevent people from continuing to do so, including adding barricades. In June 2024, an employee of the building's owner said that they had removed 18 trespassers from Pringle House in the preceding 90 days. That month, a man was critically injured after falling three floors down an earthquake-damaged stairwell.
