= Geoff Bascand =

New Zealand statistician

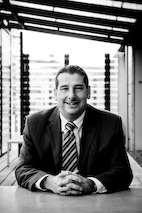
Geoff Bascand

Geoff Bascand is a New Zealand statistician, who was the Deputy Governor and Head of Operations at the Reserve Bank of New Zealand. He was Government Statistician and the Chief Executive of Statistics New Zealand until May 2013. Bascand is a graduate of the University of Otago and the Australian National University with a BA (Honours) degree in Geography and a master's degree in Economics.

== Career ==
Bascand has worked for the New Zealand Treasury, the International Monetary Fund in Washington, and the New Zealand Department of Labour. He was appointed one of three Deputy Government Statisticians for Statistics New Zealand in July 2004 and was responsible for Macro-Economic, Environment, Regional and Geography Statistics. He was appointed Government Statistician and Chief Executive of Statistics New Zealand on 22 May 2007. He started his career in 1981 at the Treasury as an economic analyst and later became Director of Forecasting. From 1998 until 2004, Bascand was the General Manager of the Labour Market Policy Group at the Department of Labour. As well as holding senior policy and management positions at the Treasury and the Department of Labour, Bascand has been a Research Fellow at the Centre of Policy Studies at Monash University in Australia, and from 1996 until 1997 he was a staff economist at the International Monetary Fund in Washington DC. In February 2005, he was a recipient of a Leadership Development Centre Fellowship award. On 12 February 2013 Bascand announced his resignation at Statistics New Zealand, finishing there on 24 May 2013. He has accepted a position at the Reserve Bank as Deputy Governor and Head of Operations.

Preceded by Brian Pink	Government Statistician, New Zealand; 2007–2013	Succeeded by Liz MacPherson
