= John Darwin (statistician) =

New Zealand statistician (1923–2008)

John Haddrick Darwin (17 December 1923 – 29 October 2008) was a New Zealand statistician. He was Government Statistician of New Zealand from 1980 to 1984 and a member of the 1985–1986 Royal Commission on the Electoral System which recommended mixed-member proportional (MMP) representation. He was awarded Honorary Life Membership of the New Zealand Statistical Association in 2005.

== Early life ==
He was born in Christchurch, Canterbury, and died in Wellington. He attended Christ's College, Christchurch, where he was dux, and graduated from the University of Canterbury with a Masters of Science degree with first class honours. He worked for the Department of Scientific and Industrial Research from 1944 to 1947, when he left to study overseas at the Cambridge University and the University of Manchester; he had double doctorates in English and Mathematics. He rejoined the DSIR on his return to New Zealand, working in the Applied Mathematics Division. He took charge of its mathematical statistics section in 1963.

== Career in Department of Statistics ==
Darwin joined the Department of Statistics (later to become Statistics New Zealand) as Deputy Government Statistician in 1978. He was appointed Government Statistician and head of the Department of Statistics in 1980. He retired in 1984.

Preceded by E. A. Harris	Government Statistician, New Zealand; 1980–1984	Succeeded by Steve Kuzmicich
