= Steve Kuzmicich =

New Zealand statistician

Stjepan Slavo Raphael Kuzmicich (2 November 1931 – 14 June 2018), was a New Zealand statistician. He served as the New Zealand government statistician from 1984 to 1992.

Preceded by John Darwin	Government Statistician, New Zealand; 1984–1992	Succeeded by Len Cook
