= Statistics New Zealand =

National statistical service of New Zealand

- Tatauranga Aotearoa (Māori)

Agency overview
- Formed: 1956
- Jurisdiction: New Zealand
- Headquarters: 8 Willis Street, Wellington, 6011
- Employees: 1155 (2020)
- Annual budget: Vote Statistics; Total budget for 2019/20 ▼$166,385,000
- Minister responsible: Hon Scott Simpson, Minister of Statistics
- Agency executive: Colin Lynch, Government Statistician
- Website: www.stats.govt.nz

Statistics New Zealand (Māori: Tatauranga Aotearoa), branded as Stats NZ, is the public service department of New Zealand charged with the collection of statistics related to the economy, population and society of New Zealand. To this end, Stats NZ produces censuses and surveys.

== Organisation ==
The organisation's staff includes statisticians, mathematicians, computer science specialists, accountants, economists, demographers, sociologists, geographers, social psychologists, and marketers.

Stats NZ is divided into seven organisational subgroups, each managed by a Deputy Government Statistician:

- Macro-economic and Environment Statistics studies prices, and national accounts, develops macro-economic statistics, does government and international accounts, and ANZSIC 06 implementation (facilitating changeover to new classification code developed jointly with Australian statistics officials.)
- Social and Population Statistics studies population, social conditions, standard of living, and census, and has a census planning manager as well as statisticians helping to develop new social statistics measures.
- Standards and Methods studies statistical methods, statistical education, and research, solutions and capabilities, information management, and develops new methodologies.
- Collections and Dissemination services clients. There is one general manager in Christchurch and one in Auckland. It develops products and services and manages publishing and customer services.
- Organisation Direction maintains contacts with key government officials, does internal audits and business planning, manages international relations and the Official Statistics System (OSS), and advises on Māori affairs.
- Industry and Labour Statistics studies business indicators, finance and performance, agriculture, energy and work knowledge and skills.
- Organisation Development focuses on services for the agency itself, including information technology management, quality assurance, application development and support, finances, corporate support, and human resources.

Many of the agency's powers, duties, and responsibilities are governed by acts of the New Zealand Parliament. The agency is a state sector organisation of New Zealand operating under the authority of the Statistics Act 1975.

== Responsibilities and activities ==
The department conducts the New Zealand census every five years. The census is officially done on one day. The most recent released census was in 2018 (the first data from the 2023 census is due for release on 29 May 2024). The count of usual residents (excluding visitors from overseas) from the 2018 census was 4,699,755. they lived in 1,664,313 occupied dwellings; their median age was 37.4 years (half older, half younger); 775,836 identified themselves as "Māori" (16.5% of the population); people had a median income of $31,800. This is a main source of information, and data collected from this census is often used for further purposes within the department as well as serving as benchmark information for numerous reports and surveys. For example, the census asks about the main means of travel to work, but by combining this with data from transport surveys, the department can issue detailed reports such as "Commuting Patterns in New Zealand: 1996–2006", with specific inferences such as "Over half of people who walked or jogged to work lived within 2km of their workplace." This information is helpful for business purposes, government decision-making, media purposes, foreign policy, journalism, public information, planning, and for many other uses. For example, the Federal Reserve Bank of New Zealand uses statistics from this agency about prices and wages to help develop economic indicators, exchange rate information, and the official cash rate.

The department supplies a wide variety of information. It reports on labour costs, incomes, civil unions and marriages, employment, electronic card transactions, food prices, retail trade, births and deaths, prices of capital goods, overseas trade, screen industry, international visitor arrivals, overseas merchandise, agriculture and fish stocks, water resources, building consents, electronic card transactions, English language providers, wholesale trade, local authority information, balance of payments data, manufacturing surveys, commuting patterns, mapping trends, culture and identity statistics, housing trends, work stoppages, gross domestic product, industrial energy use, and the list goes on and on. In addition, it analyses trends and publishes forecasts. The agency does not involve itself with political polling generally.

The agency provides information to the public. Many surveys and reports are available free of charge on its website; users can download spreadsheets electronically. In addition, some private market research firms use the agency's vast database information as source material, combining it with value-added presentation software (such as sophisticated mapping programmes), and then sell the re-packaged information.

Information from demographers is used as source material by journalists for articles. Sometimes statistics can influence public policy. For example, Stats NZ demographers in 2008 spotted a trend of fewer women having children and wrote: "Deciding not to have children happens as a consequence of other life events.... Education, career, mortgages, changes in family and partners for many couples, childlessness is what happens while they are making other plans." Their report was picked up by journalists at the Sunday Star-Times to form the basis of an article with the headline "New Zealand women stop having babies". The article discussed ramifications, such as possible workforce shortages and increased cost of elderly care, as well as possible policy actions such as a "Working for Families" programme. Newspaper headlines can influence public opinion which may impact policy decisions. Stats NZ information is used by government to explore tough problems; a research paper dated April 2009 used agency statistics when exploring how to handle gang violence.

Agency data is quoted by a wide variety of sources, even in the footnotes of books. For example, in "Connecting the Clouds – the Internet in New Zealand", author Keith Newman cites agency statistics regarding telecommunications cost decreases (the Stats NZ report said "New Zealand average residential phone call pricing plummeted 50% between 1987 and 1993") and national finances (the Stats NZ report said "The current account deficit for the year ended March 2007 was $13.9 billion (8.5 percent of GDP)"). Data is used to help retailers spot trends and act accordingly. A newspaper article on decreased do-it-yourself (DIY) retail spending in 2008 quoted an agency source: "Figures from Statistics New Zealand show DIY spend has been tracking down with the retail sector." This information helps businesses adjust to new realities. Radio programmes such as "Radio New Zealand National" have quoted agency data.

Some agency policies result in controversy. One gay activist felt Stats NZ was "breaking the law" by omitting a question on the 2006 census regarding sexual orientation; the article in the New Zealand Herald elaborated "Mr. van Wetering and the Office of Human Rights Proceedings, the independent legal branch of the commission, expect to discuss the inclusion of the (sexual orientation) question in the 2011 Census with lawyers for Statistics New Zealand later this year." There were some indications that the agency was seriously considering including a question on sexual orientation. The agency did focus groups exploring this possibility. Sometimes controversies involve disputes over whether agency data was cited properly. One blogger, claiming to be a former Wellingtonian journalist who identifies himself or herself as "Poneke", accused the Sunday Star-Times of publishing misleading data about crime statistics. Poneke noted that "Statistics New Zealand now provide(s) the ability to query the New Zealand Police Statistics – allowing you to gather detailed crime information about your local area since 1994." The blogger felt the agency was "impeccably impartial", but distrusted various media sources.

One way the agency makes data available to the public is by offering a Table Builder tool. It lets users access specific information from past surveys, and collect it into a customised set of data.

The following counts were derived by using Statistics New Zealand's Table Builder tool:

New Zealand population by sex
Census year	Men	Women
1996	1,809,309	1,872,237
2001	1,863,306	1,957,443
2006	2,021,277	2,122,005

Statistics New Zealand develops statistical classifications and standards and works with the corresponding national statistical offices with such nations as Australia, the United States, and Canada. It conducts ongoing research regarding the viability of these standards. Since the early 2000s, it has begun using the Australian and New Zealand Standard Classification of Occupation to describe a wide variety of jobs; for example, the code 111111 describes a chief executive or managing director, while the code 531111 describes a general clerk. By using standardised codes, high speed computers can sift and sort through large databases to produce summary reports.

It also provides technical assistance to developing countries in the Pacific rim, with a special focus on Pacific Island nations.

Statistics New Zealand is acknowledged as the statistical authority within government. While other branches of government generate statistics, Statistics New Zealand works with them to expedite the information as well as provide consulting services when appropriate. It is responsible for the first integrated programme of Official Social Statistics. It provides assistance, guidance and oversight to other government agencies regarding statistics when appropriate. For example, it works with the New Zealand Health Information Service regarding their management of statistical information – a downloaded spreadsheet showed there were 65,120 live births registered in 2007 in the nation, and the table listed Statistics New Zealand as a source of this information. It worked with the Ministry for Culture and Heritage to collect and publish cultural data.

== Vision ==
The department's "aim is that New Zealand increasingly gets the statistical information it needs to grow and prosper".

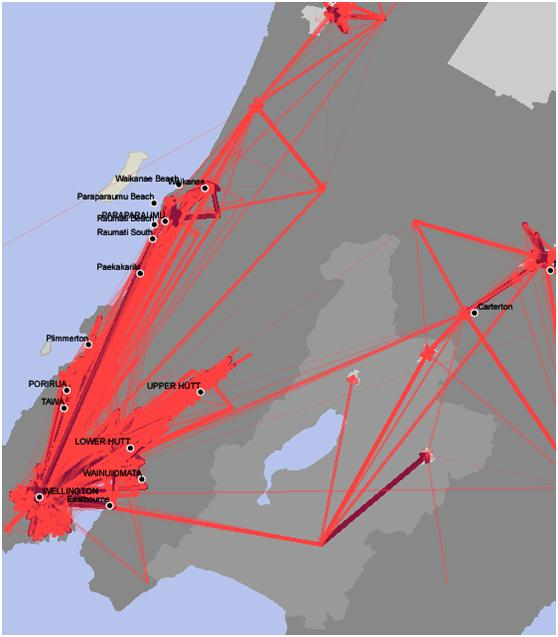
Commuting patterns in the Wellington region are shown; darker red lines indicate greater traffic. Source: Commuter view New Zealand, 2006 Census of Population and Dwellings.

The organisation's stated values are statistical excellence, integrity, confidentiality and data security, leading, connecting, and communicating. It says on its website: "By following these values, we aim to deliver accessible, relevant, and timely statistics for all New Zealanders. Confidentiality is not only a policy chosen by the department but required by law. A section of the Statistics Act 1975 reads "No information from an individual schedule is to be separately published or disclosed [Section 37(3)], except as authorised by the Statistics Act (the act permits others to see information from an individual schedule, but only when it is in a form that prevents identification of the respondent concerned, and then only under strict security conditions). This means government cannot abuse personal information from a census by revealing (or threatening to reveal it) for dubious purposes. For example, a particular person's income responses cannot be handed over to a tax collection agency.

The agency maintains an open copyright policy stating that, apart from images and content with specific copyright statement, users are free to use the work provided that Statistics New Zealand is attributed.

== Methods ==
Statistics New Zealand uses many methods to collect, process, analyse, and publish data. The agency has statisticians and mathematicians and survey experts whose chief duty is to examine how the agency approaches various projects and to suggest ways to improve efficiency, speed, and accuracy.

Some projects require advanced statistical tools to make sense of misleading data. For example, sometimes seasonality distorts data. "For example, in retail trade, December is a very high month due to Christmas sales. If we compare November sales with December sales, we will report an increase in sales. But this increase is largely due to seasonal fluctuations and is not an informative measure" according to a description from their website. To prevent seasonal variables from distorting data, statisticians sometimes use complex programmes, including X-12-ARIMA (derived from census bureaus from the US and Canada), to remove seasonal distortions. So, with the December sales bump removed, the seasonally adjusted retail sales data can reveal the true underlying trend—are sales going up, holding steady, or declining? This is important information for retailers.

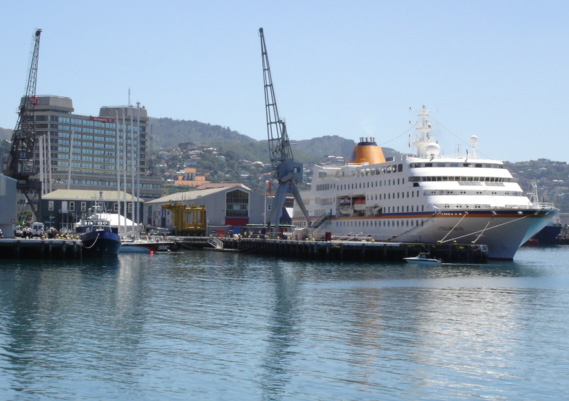
Statistics New Zealand publishes trade information, export and import data, tourism, and so forth. This information assists government planners as well as business activity.

While the census counts every person, the department also conducts surveys based on only a small sample of people. These samples are scientifically selected to represent the larger group. For example, the General Social Survey chooses a select number of households, approximately 8,000, which represent the nation as a whole, and surveys them every two years. Interviewers with laptops conduct face-to-face interviews, and the result is information about "social wellbeing" including "housing, health, paid work, social connectedness, and human rights. It sometimes conducts specialty surveys about a specific industry or topic. For example, it published a biotechnology survey, based on a 10-page questionnaire developed by the agency, using scientific samples to choose respondents; the 2007 results can be downloaded to computers via the Internet. This particular report uses a long list of variables, such as "total exports" and "biotechnology exports to Asia" and "stage of development of biotechnology processes".

Statistical techniques such as sampling and weighting can reduce data gathering expenses while surveying, although it requires careful attention by statisticians. For example, census counts are rather straightforward in a statistical sense since it is a straight count of bodies, purchases, opinions, actions. But it is expensive to interview everybody. And there are many non-census topics requiring further study which the agency is asked to do. One way to reduce costs is by selecting smaller samples which hopefully represent the population being studied. This is a highly cost-effective way to get accurate information. Choosing a good sample sometimes requires complex statistical work to make sure the sample is, indeed, truly representative of the population under study. If conditions do not permit representative sampling but known benchmark statistics are known (possibly from earlier census data), it is still possible to generate accurate information by weighting the data to distort it back, so to speak, to compensate for the distortion caused by the unrepresentative sample. For example, suppose an area of Wellington has a known percentage of women—say 53% – which is believed to be accurate from a previous census count; a study is done a few years later; a sample is chosen; questionnaires are processed; but of the returning questionnaires, 57% are women. It is possible statistically to give men slightly greater weight to account for the discrepancy, and the result is more accurate data. The agency discusses different methodologies on its website. A statement explains why weighting is sometimes necessary: "Statistics New Zealand is improving the methodology used for the 2001 Household Economic Survey through the use of integrated weighting. This is a relatively recently developed method of adjusting the statistical output of a survey to match population benchmarks. In particular, it takes account of under coverage in the survey of specified population groups. Integrated weighting improves the robustness and accuracy of survey estimates. It also reduces the effect of bias in estimates resulting from under coverage, as well as reducing the level of sampling error for benchmark variables."

Statistics New Zealand publishes data in a wide variety of formats, including tables, charts, graphs, and maps like this one, which details religious affiliations (2013).

All statistical work presents opportunities for error, but it is possible to reduce error to manageable amounts. A statement reads: "An important aim of our ongoing work is to understand, manage, control and report on all known sources of error... which simply reflect the inherent variability that exists among the units we are seeking to measure... This variability manifests itself in sampling error when we use samples for cost-effectiveness reasons to estimate characteristics about a population. Sampling errors are relatively easy to measure.... Other sources reflect process, measurement and inference errors, and are referred to as non-sampling error. It is not possible to eliminate all sources of error. However, our continued efforts at understanding and managing variability and error ensure we are exercising a high level of control on all known sources of error."

What greatly facilitates statistical accuracy by reducing non-response bias is that answering questions is sometimes required by law. Some surveys must be answered. This requirement lessens agency expense, practically eliminates non-response bias (a perennial headache for most private market researchers) and improves accuracy. For example, for the General Social Survey, people are selected randomly for 10-minute phone interviews which sometimes ask personal questions such as wage and salary information. But people must answer these questions and will not be paid for their time. It is required by the Statistics Act 1975. This policy is substantially different from countries such as the United States, where answering official surveys is rarely compulsory, including responding to its census which is done every ten years. Further, if a person does not get a census survey for any reason, he or she is still obligated to visit a local census bureau, get one, fill it out, and return it; the government cannot be held accountable for mixing up an address. Questionnaires can be downloaded from the Internet via the Statistics New Zealand website.

Legislation states census forms must be "filled in and signed within a stated time" and returned "within a stated time to the Department".

Extensive use is made of the Internet to publish key information. Users can sift through vast databases to learn about a wide variety of topics. A user can learn that "89% of businesses use broadband to connect to the Internet" or that "145 babies were born on Mother's Day in 2008". Entire reports can be downloaded as .pdf files and printed on one's computer.

== History ==
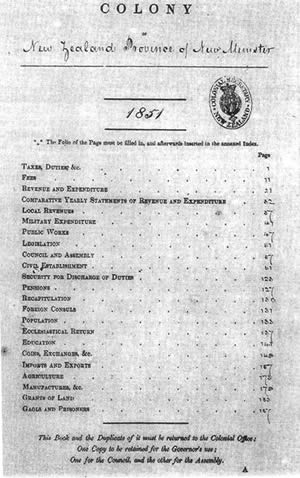
In colonial times, there was a "Blue Book" of official statistics, compiled by various magistrates. Here is a photo of the table of contents dated 1851 for the southern island, then called "New Munster". Source = Statistics New Zealand (National Archives).

In the nation's early days, with a small population and before the advent of powered transportation and modern telecommunications, there was little need for statistics nor ability to create them. In the colonial years, sometimes magistrates and police officials collected data as part of their work. After about the 1890s, the official information source presented to the public was called the New Zealand Official Yearbook compiled from various departments. Sometimes data about animals were collected (a census of poultry ceased in 1971); one census taker on horseback drowned while crossing a river. In 1956, the newly created Department of Statistics had 164 employees. Tabulating techniques improved. One source writes: "As both New Zealand's population and the complexity of the information sought grew, so did the size of the army of temporary clerks that was employed every five years by the Census and Statistics Office to process it. Sitting at long tables, they added, subtracted and calculated percentages. From the 1890s census data was written on cards which were sorted by hand.

The drudgery of statistical work was gradually eased as adding and calculating machines and typewriters came into use, operated mostly by women. Tabulating machines were imported from the United States in the 1920s to process punched cards; this too was women's work," according to a book written by David Green in 2002. The agency grew in size. Tabulating machines were replaced by mainframe computers, then microcomputers, then the Internet. "Since the early 1980s computing has been done in-house, and in the 1990s personal computers and the Internet revolutionised the day-to-day experience of work at Statistics New Zealand," according to Green's book.

Management positions have changed over time as well. The post of Government Statistician was created in 1910 within the Registrar-General's Office, before a separate Census and Statistics Office was set up in 1913. Before 1910 most statistics for the colony or dominion as a whole were the responsibility of the Registrar-General himself.

The well-regarded economist J.B. Condliffe worked at the agency after First World War, but no fully qualified mathematicians until after the Second, when in-house training in statistical methods also began. Since 1910, the post of Government Statistician has been held by different persons. From 1955 until 1994 the agency was known as the Department of Statistics until the name was changed to the current one.

=== Government statisticians ===
- 1910–1911: William Marcus Wright
- 1911–1932: Malcolm Fraser
- 1932–1946: Jim Butcher
- 1946–1958: George Wood
- 1958–1969: John V.T. Baker
- 1969–1973: Jack Lewin
- 1973–1980: Ernie Harris
- 1980–1984: John Darwin
- 1984–1992: Steve Kuzmicich
- 1992–1999: Len Cook
- 1999–2007: Brian Pink
- 2007–2013: Geoff Bascand
- 2013–2020: Liz MacPherson
- 2020–2025: Mark Sowden
- 2025: Mary Craig (acting)

The agency has grown in size and sophistication from its early beginnings. As times change, information needs change accordingly. For example, in the late 1990s and early 2000s, politicians became interested in the concept of sustainable development. The agency found ways to measure these trends to provide helpful information for planners. In August 2002, it published its first report on Sustainable Development Indicators, which measured variables such as water quality, energy usage, sustainability of cities, and youth development. Environment Minister Marian Hobbs said in 2003 "...the growth we have must be sustained over a number of generations. Therefore, we need to plan for that growth so that we don't add to our problems." As the department moves into the future, and if the past is an indication of the future, it is likely to continue its trajectory of larger size, more responsibility, increased technical sophistication via Internet and broadband tools.

The 2011 national census was cancelled due to the disruption and displacement of people caused by the February 2011 Christchurch earthquake. The census was rescheduled and took place on 5 March 2013.

On 13 August 2019, the Chief Statistician Liz MacPherson resigned following the release of a report criticising the department's handling of the 2018 New Zealand census. Due to a decision to conduct the census solely online, the 2018 Census only attracted an 83% response rate, well short of the 94% Census percent target and a nine percent drop from the previous 2013 Census.

On 21 May 2024, Statistics New Zealand announced that it would not renew the lease for its Auckland office at Greys Avenue building due to staff safety concerns in the Auckland CBD. Key issues including anti-social behaviour around the building's entrance and surrounding street.
