= 2018 New Zealand census =

Thirty-fourth national census of New Zealand

Thirty-fourth census of New Zealand
- 6 March 2018; 8 years ago

General information
- Country: New Zealand

Results
- Total population: 4,699,755 (▲10.79%)
- Most populous region: Auckland (1,571,718)
- Least populous region: West Coast (31,575)

The 2018 New Zealand census, which took place on Tuesday 6 March 2018, was the thirty-fourth national census in New Zealand. The population of New Zealand was counted as 4,699,755 – an increase of 457,707 (10.79%) over the 2013 census.

Results from the 2018 census were released to the public on 23 September 2019, from the Statistics New Zealand website. The most recent New Zealand census was held in March 2023.

== History ==
=== Background ===
The Census Act 1877 required censuses to be held every fifth year and is well embedded in legislation and government systems. Since 1881, censuses have been held every five years, with the exceptions of those in 1931 and 1941 and the one in 2011 which was cancelled due to the February 2011 earthquake in Christchurch, which displaced many Canterbury residents from their homes only a few weeks before census day. It was rescheduled for March 2013, so the 2013 census is the previous census completed before this one.

=== Issues and controversies ===
In July 2018, it was estimated that the 2018 census had a "full or partial" response for 90 percent of individuals, down from 94.5 percent in the 2013 census and the planned release date for census information was changed from October of the same year to March 2019. This drop, which already amounted to the lowest census response rate for fifty years, was blamed on a 'digital-first' policy for the census. An independent review was initiated by the Government Statistician in October 2019, and in November Statistics NZ announced that release of census data would be pushed back to at least April 2019 due to "the complex nature of the task".

In early April 2019, the Government Statistician, Liz MacPherson was facing possible charges of contempt of parliament. She had twice refused, on 13 February and in early April, to disclose the number of partially and fully completed responses. On 9 April, she reported that one in seven New Zealanders, 700,000 people, failed to complete the census.

In July 2019 the independent inquiry returned its findings to the Government Statistician, the Minister of Statistics and the State Services Commissioner, reporting that too little attention had been paid to the non-digital aspects of the census, but also blamed operational complexity and flaws in management. Due to a decision to conduct the census primarily online, the census attracted only an 83% response rate, even lower than the 90% earlier reported, and well short of the 94% census percent target and a nine percent drop from the previous 2013 New Zealand census.

On 13 August 2019 the report was released to the public and Liz MacPherson offered her resignation, taking ultimate responsibility for the results, stating "I'm sorry, the buck stops with me." State Services Commissioner Peter Hughes agreed with her assessment, and asked MacPherson to remain in her role until Christmas of 2019, noting that "she is the best person to finish the remediation work".

== Topics ==
The 2018 census collected data on the following topics:

Population structure

- Absentees
- Age (Note: Required to be included under the Statistics Act 1975 or the Electoral Act 1993.)
- Legally registered relationship status
- Name
- Number of children born
- Partnership status in current relationship
- Number of occupants on census night
- Sex

Location

- Dwelling address
- Census night address
- Usual residence
- Usual residence one year ago (Note: Topic not included in 2013 census.)
- Years at usual residence

Culture and identity

- Birthplace
- Ethnicity
- Iwi affiliation
- Languages spoken
- Māori descent
- Religious affiliation
- Years since arrival in New Zealand

Education and training

- Field of study
- Highest qualification
- Highest secondary school qualification
- Level of post-school qualification
- Study participation

Work

- Hours worked in employment per week
- Industry
- Occupation
- Sector of ownership
- Status in employment
- Unpaid activities
- Work and labour force status
- Workplace address

Income

- Sources of personal income
- Total personal income

Families and households

- Child dependency status
- Extended families
- Family type
- Household composition

Housing

- Access to basic amenities
- Access to telecommunication systems
- Dwelling counts (occupied, unoccupied, under construction)
- Dwelling dampness indicator
- Dwelling mould indicator
- Individual home ownership
- Main types of heating
- Number of rooms
- Number of bedrooms
- Occupied dwelling type
- Sector of landlord
- Tenure of household
- Weekly rent paid by households

Transport

- Education institution address
- Main means of travel to education
- Main means of travel to work
- Number of motor vehicles

Health and disability
- Cigarette smoking behaviour
- Disability/activity limitations

== Projections ==
Statistics New Zealand annually conducts population projections for New Zealand as a whole, which are based on data from the previous census (in this case, the 2013 census) and calculated using a cohort-component method. Population projections also take into consideration births, deaths, and net migration.

In 2016, New Zealand's population at the time of the 2018 census was projected to be between 4,807,000 and 4,944,000.

== Results ==
Data uses fixed random rounding to protect confidentiality; each data point is rounded either to the nearest multiple of 3 (2/3 chance) or the next-nearest multiple of 3 (1/3 chance).

The census usually-resident population count of New Zealand is a count of all people who usually live in and were present in the country on census night (6 March 2018), and excludes overseas visitors and New Zealand residents who are temporarily overseas.

Due to the high rate of non-response in the census, the published results combine answers from census forms with data from the 2013 Census and from government administrative data. Reports from an External Data Quality Review Panel include quality ratings for each variable, taking the added data into account.

=== Population and dwellings ===
Population counts for regions of New Zealand. All figures are for the census usually-resident population count.

Region	Population		Change	
Region	2013 census	2018 census	Change	pp
Northland	151,689	179,076	▲27,387	▲18.05
Auckland	1,415,550	1,571,718	▲156,168	▲11.03
Waikato	403,638	458,202	▲54,564	▲13.52
Bay of Plenty	267,744	308,499	▲40,755	▲15.22
Gisborne	43,656	47,517	▲3,861	▲8.84
Hawke's Bay	151,179	166,368	▲15,189	▲10.05
Taranaki	109,608	117,561	▲7,953	▲7.26
Manawatū-Whanganui	222,672	238,797	▲16,125	▲7.24
Wellington	471,315	506,814	▲35,499	▲7.53
North Island	3,237,048	3,594,552	▲357,504	▲11.0
Tasman	47,154	52,389	▲5,235	▲11.10
Nelson	46,437	50,880	▲4,443	▲9.57
Marlborough	43,416	47,340	▲4,014	▲9.25
West Coast	32,148	31,575	▼573	▼1.78
Canterbury	539,436	599,694	▲60,258	▲11.17
Otago	202,467	225,186	▲22,719	▲11.22
Southland	93,342	97,467	▲4,125	▲4.42
South Island	1,004,397	1,104,537	▲100,140	▲9.97
Area outside region	600	669	▲69	▲11.50
New Zealand	4,242,048	4,699,755	▲457,707	▲10.79

- Resident population count was 4,699,755, up 457,707 from the 2013 Census.
  - There are 2,319,558 males in New Zealand (49.35% of the population) and 2,380,197 females (50.65% of the population).
- On average, the population grew by around 2.1% per year since the 2013 Census – significantly higher than the annual average growth between 2006 and 2013, which was 0.7%.
  - The higher growth rate is consistent with higher net migration of 259,000 in the five years ended 30 June 2018 compared with 59,000 in the seven years ended 30 June 2013.
- Among children (under 15 years), males outnumbered females, with around 105 males for every 100 females. The ratio declined with age: there were 104 males for every 100 females in the age group of 15–29, 95 males for every 100 females at ages 30–64 years, and 87 males for every 100 females at age 65 or above.
- There was a total of 1,855,962 occupied and unoccupied private dwellings, 108,558 more than in 2013.
  - Ten percent of private dwellings were unoccupied.

=== Birthplace ===
In 2018, 3,370,122 people (71.7%) were born in New Zealand, with 1,329,633 (28.3%) born overseas.

Data is for the census's usually-resident population.

Birthplace of New Zealanders
1. New Zealand (71.7%)
2. England (4.49%)
3. China (2.83%)
4. India (2.50%)
5. Australia (1.61%)
6. South Africa (1.52%)
7. Philippines (1.44%)
8. Fiji (1.33%)
9. Samoa (1.18%)
10. Unspecified (1.22%)
11. Other (10.2%)

Birthplace	Responses		Change from 2013	
Birthplace	Number	%	Number	pp
New Zealand	3,370,122	71.71	▲389,298	▼1.44
Overseas	1,329,633	28.29	▲327,846	▲4.68
England	210,915	4.49	▼4,674	▼0.92
China, Mainland	132,906	2.83	▲43,785	▲0.73
India	117,348	2.50	▲50,172	▲0.91
Australia	75,696	1.61	▲12,984	▲0.04
South Africa	71,382	1.52	▲17,104	▲0.61
Philippines	67,632	1.44	▲30,333	▲0.50
Fiji	62,310	1.33	▲9,555	▼0.01
Samoa	55,512	1.18	▲4,851	▼0.09
South Korea	30,975	0.66	▲4,374	▼0.01
United States	27,678	0.59	▲6,216	▲0.05
Tonga	26,856	0.57	▲4,443	▲0.04
Scotland	26,136	0.56	▲183	▼0.09
Total people stated	4,641,897	98.77	–	–
Inadequately described	432	0.01	–	–
Not stated	57,426	1.22	–	–
Total	4,699,755	100	▲457,707	▲9.74

=== Ethnicity ===
There was no change in the top five ethnicities between the 2013 and 2018 censuses, which are New Zealand European (64.1%), Māori (16.5%), Chinese (4.9%), Indian (4.7%), and Samoan (3.9%).

Data is for the census usually-resident population count.

Results add up to over 100% due to people declaring multiple ethnicities.

Ethnicity of New Zealanders
Ethnicity	Percent
European	71.76
Māori	16.51
Asian	15.30
Pasifika	9.00
MELAA	1.54
Other	1.24

Ethnic group	Population	%
European	3,372,708	71.76
New Zealand European	3,013,440	64.12
English	72,204	1.54
South African European	37,155	0.79
Australian	29,349	0.62
European nfd	34,632	0.74
Dutch	29,820	0.63
Scottish	18,627	0.40
Irish	17,835	0.38
German	16,818	0.36
American European	16,245	0.35
Other European	86,583	1.84
Māori	775,836	16.51
Asian	718,995	15.30
Chinese nfd	231,387	4.92
Indian nfd	221,916	4.72
Filipino	72,612	1.55
Korean	35,664	0.76
Japanese	18,141	0.39
Fijian Indian	15,132	0.32
Asian nfd	11,811	0.25
Thai	10,623	0.23
Vietnamese	10,086	0.21
Other Asian	91,623	1.95
Pasifika	423,036	9.00
Samoan	182,721	3.89
Tongan	82,389	1.75
Cook Islands Maori	80,532	1.71
Niuean	30,867	0.66
Fijian	19,722	0.42
MELAA	72,231	1.54
Latin American	27,756	0.59
Middle Eastern	28,626	0.61
African	15,849	0.34
Other	58,104	1.24
New Zealander nfd	45,330	0.96
Other	8,757	0.19
Not listed	4,017	0.09
Total	4,699,755	100

=== Religion ===
Most New Zealanders, 48.5% of the population, identify as being irreligious. Data is for the census usually-resident population count.

Religious affiliation	Population	%
Irreligious	2,278,185	48.47
No Religion nfd	2,264,601	48.19
Atheism	7,068	0.15
Agnosticism	6,516	0.14
Christian	1,738,638	37.00
Anglican	314,913	6.70
Christian nfd	307,926	6.55
Roman Catholic	295,743	6.29
Presbyterian	221,199	4.71
Catholicism nfd	173,016	3.68
Latter-day Saints	54,123	1.15
Methodist nfd	52,734	1.12
Baptist nfd	35,967	0.77
Born Again	33,486	0.71
Pentecostal nfd	22,296	0.47
Jehovah's Witnesses	20,061	0.43
Christian Fellowship	18,042	0.38
Seventh-day Adventist	17,799	0.38
Assemblies of God	14,883	0.32
Tongan Methodist	11,169	0.24
Other Christian	145,281	3.09
Hinduism	123,504	2.63
Hinduism nfd	121,644	2.59
Other Hinduism	1,890	0.04
Islam	61,455	1.31
Islam nfd	57,276	1.22
Sunni	2,961	0.06
Other Islam	1,218	0.03
Buddhism	52,779	1.12
Buddhism nfd	44,355	0.94
Theravada Buddhism	4,851	0.10
Zen Buddhism	1,401	0.03
Mahayana Buddhism	1,026	0.02
Other Buddhism	1,144	0.02
Judaism	5,274	0.11
Judaism nfd	3,348	0.07
Other Judaism	1,926	0.04
Māori Religions	62,634	1.33
Rātana	43,821	0.93
Ringatū	12,336	0.26
Māori Religions, Beliefs and Philosophies nfd/nec	5,283	0.11
Pai Mārire	1,194	0.03
New Age	19,011	0.40
Spiritualist	8,262	0.18
Pagan	2,730	0.06
Rastafari	1,707	0.04
Wiccan	1,482	0.03
Other New Age Religions nec	1,311	0.03
Satanism	1,149	0.02
Other	91,239	1.94
Sikhism	40,908	0.87
Jedi	20,409	0.43
Church of the Flying Spaghetti Monster	4,248	0.09
Baháʼí	2,925	0.06
Taoism	1,098	0.02
Zoroastrian	1,068	0.02
Other	20,583	0.44
Object to answering	312,795	6.66
Total people stated	4,699,755	100
Total responses	4,732,641	N/A

=== Language ===
The vast majority of New Zealanders, 95.4%, speak English; in second place is Māori, with 4.0% of the population being able to speak it. Data is for the census usually-resident population count.

Language	Population	%
English	4,482,135	95.37
Māori	185,955	3.96
Samoan	101,937	2.17
No language (e.g., too young to talk)	101,751	2.17
Northern Chinese	95,253	2.03
Hindi	69,471	1.48
French	55,116	1.17
Yue	52,767	1.12
Sinitic (not further defined)	51,501	1.10
Tagalog	43,278	0.92
German	41,385	0.88
Spanish	38,823	0.83
Afrikaans	36,966	0.79
Tongan	35,820	0.76
Panjabi	34,227	0.73
Korean	31,323	0.67
Fiji Hindi	26,805	0.57
Japanese	24,885	0.53
Dutch	23,343	0.50
New Zealand Sign Language	22,986	0.49
Gujarati	22,200	0.47
Other	256,275	5.45
Total people	4,699,755	100
Total responses	5,834,166	N/A

=== Māori descent ===
New Zealanders who declare Māori descent.
1. Some descent (18.5%)
2. No descent (79.0%)
3. Unknown descent (2.44%)

18.5% of New Zealanders have at least some Māori descent. Data is for the census usually-resident population count.

Māori descent indicator	Population	%
Māori descent	869,850	18.51
No Māori descent	3,715,050	79.04
Do not know	114,855	2.44
Total	4,699,755	100

=== Age ===
The largest age group is people aged 25 to 29, who comprise 7.3% of the population. Data is the census usually-resident population count.

Ages	Population	%
0–4	294,921	6.28
5–9	322,632	6.86
10–14	305,847	6.51
15–19	301,821	6.42
20–24	317,400	6.75
25–29	344,466	7.33
30–34	317,034	6.75
35–39	295,395	6.29
40–44	291,345	6.20
45–49	321,483	6.84
50–54	308,589	6.57
55–59	302,759	6.44
60–64	260,901	5.55
65–69	229,032	4.87
70–74	183,636	3.91
75–79	132,792	2.83
80–89	85,362	1.82
85–89	53,979	1.15
90–94	23,817	0.59
95–99	5,910	0.13
100–104	606	0.01
105–109	39	0.00
110+	0	0.00
Minors (0–17)	1,104,240	23.50
Working-age adults (18–64)	2,880,345	61.29
Seniors (65+)	715,173	15.22
Total	4,699,755	100

=== Sex ===
Data is the census usually-resident population count.

Declared sex of New Zealanders
1. Male (49.4%)
2. Female (50.6%)

Sex	Population
Male	2,319,558
Female	2,380,197

=== Income ===
Data is for the census usually-resident population count of people aged 15 years and over.

Income (NZD)	Population	%
Loss	20,625	0.55
Zero income	257,310	6.81
$1–$5,000	210,705	5.58
$5,001–$10,000	177,423	4.70
$10,001–$15,000	262,197	6.94
$15,001–$20,000	375,282	9.94
$20,001–$25,000	306,639	8.12
$25,001–$30,000	210,132	5.56
$30,001–$35,000	186,087	4.93
$35,001–$40,000	212,724	5.63
$40,001–$50,000	364,719	9.66
$50,001–$60,000	309,375	8.19
$60,001–$70,000	234,606	6.21
$70,001–$100,000	361,317	9.57
$100,001–$150,000	176,310	4.67
$150,001 or more	110,910	2.94
Total	3,776,355	100

=== Industry of employment ===
Data is for the census usually-resident population count of employed people aged 15 years and over.

Industry (ANZSIC division)	Population	%
Agriculture, forestry and fishing	143,127	5.85
Mining	6,054	0.25
Manufacturing	238,413	9.75
Electricity, gas, water and waste services	18,006	0.74
Construction	226,161	9.25
Wholesale trade	119,928	4.90
Retail trade	219,132	8.96
Accommodation and food services	159,753	6.53
Transport, postal and warehousing	105,150	4.30
Information media and telecommunications	38,889	1.59
Financial and insurance services	64,941	2.66
Rental, hiring and real estate services	49,122	2.01
Professional, scientific and technical services	242,619	9.92
Administrative and support services	111,648	4.57
Public administration and safety	132,279	5.41
Education and training	198,018	8.10
Health care and social assistance	232,119	9.49
Arts and recreation services	44,466	1.82
Other services	95,292	3.90
Total	2,445,141	100.00

=== Home ownership ===
Home ownership among New Zealanders.
1. Own or partly own (34.7%)
2. Does not own (41.0%)
3. Held in trust (9.27%)
4. Other (15.0%)

Data is for the census usually-resident population count of people aged 15 years and over.

Individual home ownership	Population	%
Hold in a family trust	350,136	9.27
Own or partly own	1,310,925	34.71
Do not own and do not hold in a family trust	1,548,078	40.99
Other	567,213	15.02
Total	3,776,355	100

=== Marriage status ===
Marriage among New Zealanders.
1. Unmarried (29.1%)
2. Married (40.1%)
3. Separated (2.47%)
4. Divorced (6.48%)
5. Widowed (4.42%)
6. Other (17.4%)

Data is for the census usually-resident population count of people aged 15 years and over.

Legally-registered relationship status	Population	%
Married (not separated)	1,515,261	40.12
Separated	93,408	2.47
Divorced or dissolved	244,857	6.48
Widowed or surviving civil union partner	166,869	4.42
Never married and never in a civil union	1,099,722	29.12
Other	656,234	17.38
Total	3,776,355	100
