= CentrePort Wellington =

Port operating company in New Zealand

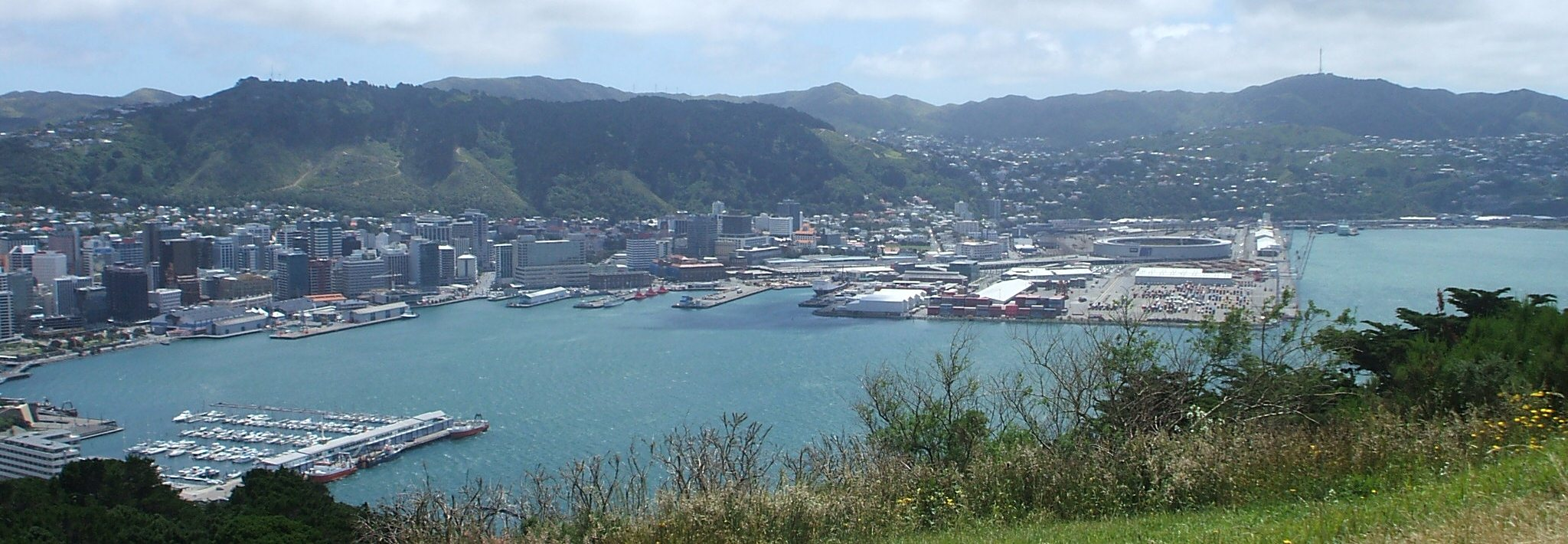
- Wellington wharves viewed from Mount Victoria
- Interactive map of CentrePort Wellington
- Location within New Zealand

Location
- Country: New Zealand
- Location: Wellington Harbour
- Coordinates: 41.276°S 174.787°E
- UN/LOCODE: NZWLG

Details
- Type of Harbor: Natural
- Land area: 75 hectares (190 acres)
- Draft depth: 11.1 metres (36 ft)

CentrePort Limited
- Trade name: CentrePort Wellington
- Formerly: Port Wellington Limited, Port of Wellington Limited.
- Industry: Port
- Founded: 28 September 1988
- Headquarters: Wellington, New Zealand
- Key people: Anthony Delaney (CEO); Lachie Johnstone (Chairman)
- Owners: Greater Wellington Regional Council and Horizons Regional Council
- Website: www.centreport.co.nz

CentrePort Wellington (CentrePort) provides land and sea infrastructure and manages port facilities in Wellington Harbour in New Zealand. The company is the successor to the Wellington Harbour Board, and was formed as one of the outcomes of the 1989 local government reforms. This article is about both the company and the port.

CentrePort manages cargo passing through the port of Wellington. This includes containers, logs, vehicles and other bulk cargo. Fuel imports are managed at wharves at Seaview and Miramar. The company leases wharf facilities to the Interislander and StraitNZ ferry services which operate across Cook Strait between Wellington and Picton in the South Island, and it provides support for cruise ships that visit Wellington each year.

When the new port company was formed, it owned approximately 72 hectares (180 acres) of Wellington waterfront property including wharves. The remainder of the Wellington waterfront area from Shed 21 to Clyde Quay Wharf, including all the buildings, was transferred to Wellington City Council. CentrePort is local government-owned. As of 2023, the shareholdings in the company are Greater Wellington Regional Council (77%), and Horizons Regional Council (23%).

== Background ==
The Wellington Harbour Board was disestablished after the passing of the Port Companies Act 1988 and the Local Government Act 1989, as part of the 1989 local government reforms. Operational port assets were transferred to a new company called Port of Wellington in 1989. Ownership of the Port of Wellington company was vested in Greater Wellington Regional Council and Horizons Regional Council. When the port company was formed, it owned approximately 72 hectares (180 acres) of Wellington waterfront property including wharves. The remainder of the Wellington waterfront area, from Shed 21 to Clyde Quay Wharf, including all the buildings, was transferred to Wellington City Council.

In 1989, over 50% of business through the port was with the European Economic Community and Japan. Australia, North America and other parts of Asia also accounted for a large portion of the trade through Port of Wellington. Port of Wellington changed its name to Port Wellington in 1997 and then to CentrePort in May 1999, to emphasise the fact that the port is in the centre of New Zealand and able to serve a large geographical area.

In July 1999, CentrePort announced that it would spend up to $50 million in a ten-year plan to improve facilities on 47 hectares (120 acres) of its land between Waterloo Quay, opposite Wellington railway station, and the Kaiwharawhara reclamation. This would include moving port offices and log storage facilities, and building a new wharf at Kaiwharawhara, new sheds and a fishing jetty. The company stated that it would lease out 4 hectares (9.9 acres) of underused land along Waterloo Quay for a hotel, apartments or other commercial activities. This evolved into the Harbour Quays project, launched in July 2005.

As of 2023, the shareholdings in CentrePort are Greater Wellington Regional Council (77%), and Horizons Regional Council (23%). In 2024, as part of its long-term plan process, Greater Wellington Regional Council undertook public consultation on a proposal to purchase the remaining shares of CentrePort, if they became available.

=== Harbour Quays ===
CentrePort's Harbour Quays project aimed at developing CentrePort's land along Waterloo Quay, between Bunny St and the Sky Stadium, into a business park with office buildings, retail and recreational spaces. CentrePort said there was space for up to 12 multi-storey buildings to house 4,000 workers. A group of Wellington business and property owners known as Vibrant Wellington opposed the Harbour Quays project, fearing that it would take thousands of workers out of the city centre. Spokesman Ian Cassels did acknowledge that Harbour Quays "could be positive and really contribute to Wellington's future if it manages to adopt some of those mixed-use alternatives". The first new building in the project was Statistics House, completed in 2005. BNZ Harbour Quays was built in 2009, and the Customhouse was built in 2010.

== Operations ==
CentrePort manages cargo passing through the port of Wellington. This includes containers, logs, vehicles and other bulk cargo. Fuel imports are managed at wharves at Seaview and Miramar. The company leases wharf facilities to the Interislander and StraitNZ ferry services which operate across Cook Strait between Wellington and Picton in the South Island, and it provides support for cruise ships that visit Wellington each year.

=== Containers ===
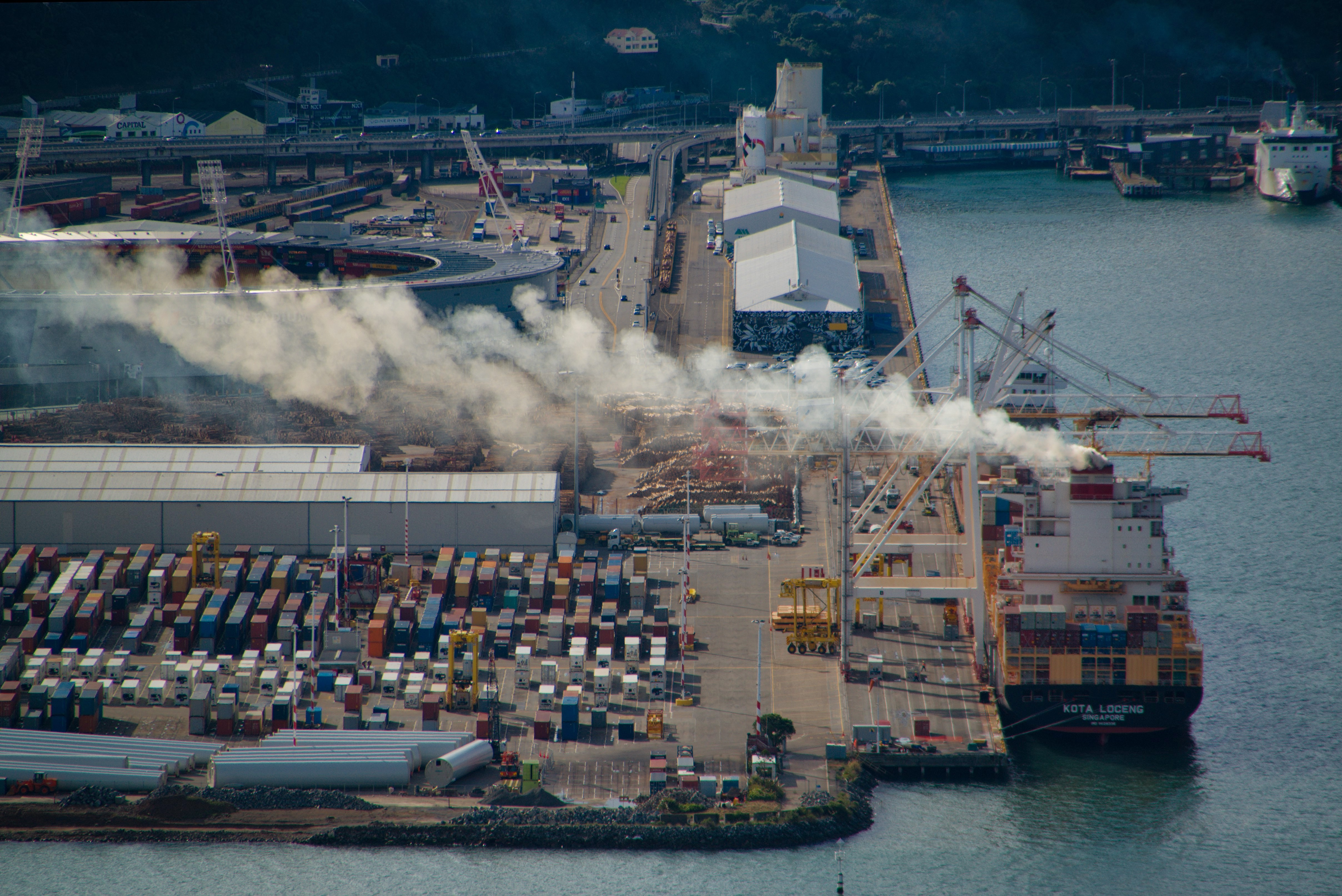
Container terminal at CentrePort, 2015. The Interislander ferry terminal is at top right.

The container terminal was developed by Wellington Harbour Board in the early 1970s, and by 1979 there were three container cranes in service. In 2006, two new container cranes were commissioned, to replace the three cranes originally installed in the 1970s. The new cranes have greater capacity because they are twin-lift, capable of lifting two containers at a time. In 2011, the last of the original three container cranes was removed from service.

Container operations at CentrePort were severely disrupted by the 2016 Kaikōura earthquake. There was damage to wharves and facilities and the large container cranes were disabled for 10 months. While the cranes were out of action, only ships with their own cranes on board could unload containers at CentrePort. Following the completion of repairs to the earthquake damage to the Thorndon container wharf in 2022, the operational length of the wharf was increased from 125m to 262m.

The COVID-19 pandemic significantly disrupted trade and led to a world-wide shortage of containers. Internationally, trade decreased and containers were stuck at ports around the world.

Increasingly larger container ships have been introduced internationally over the last 20 years. The proportion of ships of 4,000–5,999 TEU (twenty-foot-equivalent unit containers) arriving in New Zealand almost doubled from 34% to 62% between 2014 and 2020. By 2020, approximately 50% of containers moved through CentrePort were on cargo ships of 4,000 or more TEU. In 2023, CentrePort ranked seventh out of eleven container ports in New Zealand, by container TEU throughput.

=== Bulk cargo ===
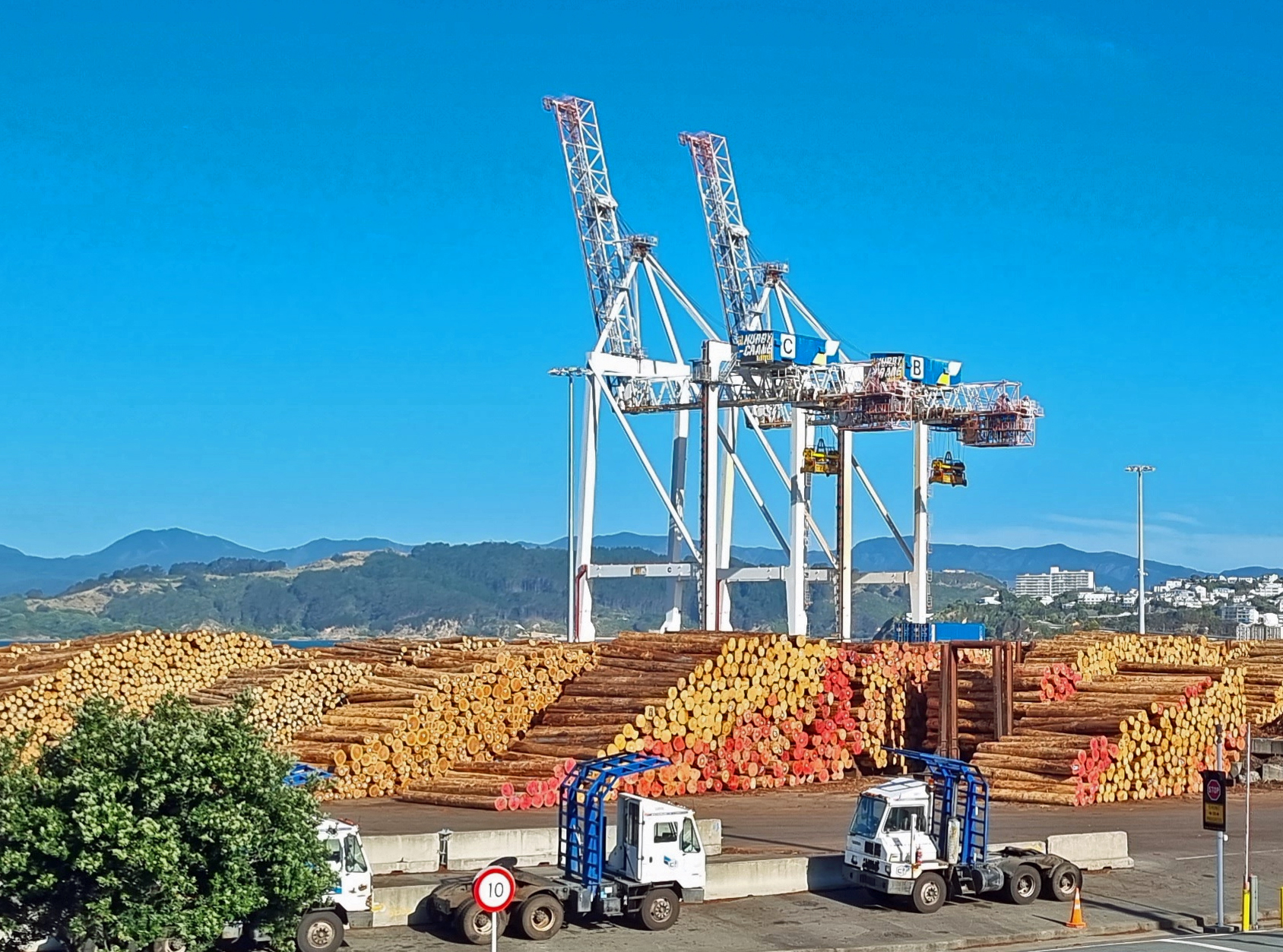
Logs awaiting export, at CentrePort 2024.

The port handles a diverse range of bulk materials including vehicles, petroleum, logs, cement and other bulk cargo. In 2021, the port handled 2.6 million tonnes of bulk cargo, ranking sixth by volume amongst New Zealand ports.

The volume of logs handled by CentrePort almost doubled in the five years between 2011 and 2016. In 2016 an existing rail hub at Waingawa in the Wairarapa was expanded for log transportation. The rail hub results from a collaboration between CentrePort, Forest Enterprises Limited, Farman Turkington Forestry and KiwiRail. It enables companies to send logs to CentrePort by rail rather than road, which has benefits for profitability, traffic and the environment. Logs can also be stored at the hub, relieving pressure on space at CentrePort.

In 2021, rail transport to the port carried 29% of bulk cargo exports.

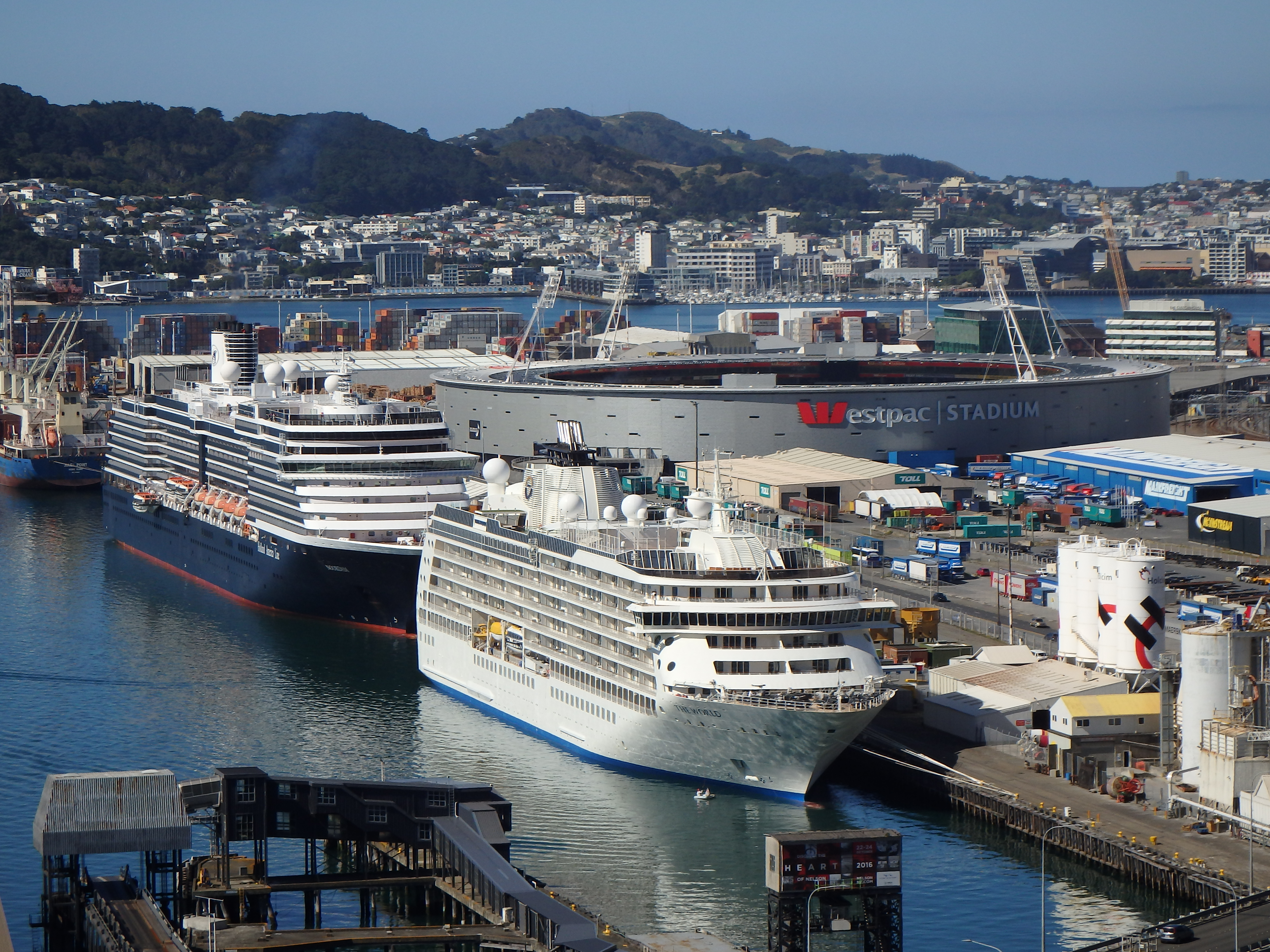
Cruise ships berthed at Aotea Quay, 2017

=== Cruise ships ===
In the 1996/97 summer season, nine cruise ships visited Wellington. The following season there were 20 visits, and by the 2022/23 season there were over 100 visits annually, with some ships returning several times during the season. Cruise ships berthed at the Overseas Passenger Terminal in the 1990s, but as ships got bigger the terminal became unsuitable since it could only handle vessels up to 240m long. From the late 1990s, cruise ships berthed at either Queens Wharf or Aotea Quay. In 2009 Wellington City Council built a sheltered walkway along the one-kilometre stretch of road between the cruise ship base at Aotea Quay and Wellington Railway Station so that cruise ship passengers could walk to the city if they wished. CentrePort changed the layout of its site after the 2016 Kaikōura earthquake. Cruise ships berthed at Aotea Quay in the same area as cargo ships, which meant that for safety reasons cruise passengers are no longer allowed to walk through the wharf area to the city. Cruise ships stopped visiting for three years due to the COVID-19 pandemic, returning in the 2022/23 season. In 2023, CentrePort ranked third highest port by number of cruise ship visits, with 89 ships calling.

=== Tugs ===
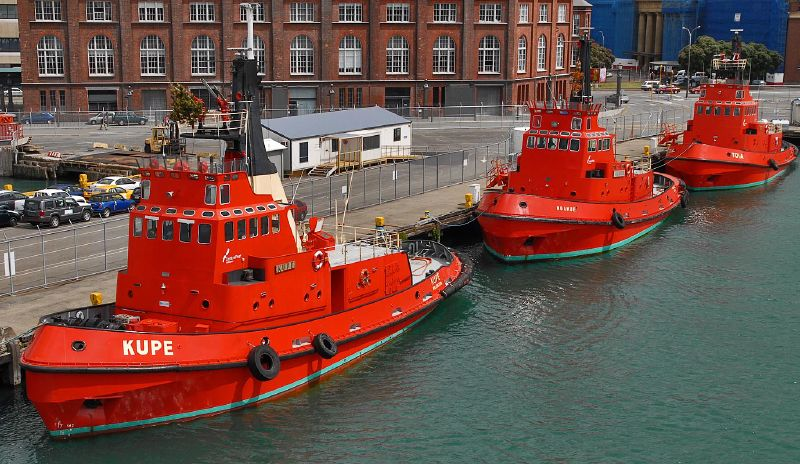
CentrePort's long-serving tugs Kupe, Ngahue and Toia in 2007. These have since been replaced.

In 1968 the passenger ferry Wahine ran aground at the entrance to Wellington Harbour and 51 people died on the day, with two more passengers dying later from their injuries. The Union Steam Ship Company's tug Tapuhi was not strong enough to assist the Wahine. Responding to the disaster, the Harbour Board bought new, bigger tugs: Kupe, which went into service in 1971, Toia (1972) and Ngahue (1977). CentrePort sold Kupe in 2009, and Toia and Ngahue in 2014. These were replaced by Tiaki and Tapuhi. Tiaki and Tapuhi have a stronger bollard pull than the previous tugs, and are designed to operate with large cruise ships and container ships within the harbour. They are acknowledged to be not as suited to salvage work or work in open water as the previous tugs. In 2023 there were two instances of large ships drifting without power in Cook Strait, and in both cases CentrePort's tugs were not suited to assist them effectively. This has raised concerns that another Wahine disaster could happen if a ship gets into trouble outside the harbour. After a third incident in November 2023, when a cargo ship had engine trouble off Cape Palliser and had to be towed to Wellington Harbour by a tug working on a project within the harbour, Wellington's harbour master stated that "we are relying on luck to avoid shipping incidents around the coast".

In June 2024, the government announced that it would allocate $600,000 for a study looking into the feasibility of providing an ocean-going tug for Cook Strait. The decision was welcomed by Wellington Regional Council and Marlborough District Council.

=== Wharves ===
As of 2023, there are 20 wharves situated around Wellington Harbour. This includes large commercial wharves in the inner harbour and port area, smaller wharves in seaside suburbs and the fuel wharves at Seaview and Evans Bay. The first wharves were built from 1840 by newly arrived European settlers, to enable them to move goods from ship to shore. The first publicly owned wharf built in Wellington Harbour was Queens Wharf, completed in 1862. In 1880 the Wellington Harbour Board was created and took control of most wharves in the harbour until its disestablishment in the 1989 New Zealand local government reforms.

CentrePort owns and operates the commercial wharves in the inner harbour area and the fuel wharves at Seaview and Evans Bay. Other wharves around the harbour are owned by local councils.

==== Seaview wharf ====
CentrePort owns and maintains a wharf at Seaview that serves a fuel terminal. The Seaview fuel terminal is the main point of supply for liquid fuels for the lower North Island, and is also a backup point of supply for other parts of the North Island. The landward end of the wharf is at Point Howard and it is approximately 600 metres (2,000 ft) long. Fuel pipelines along the wharf connect with bulk fuel storage facilities in Seaview. The fuel terminal handles approximately one million tonnes of fuel annually.

Planning for the construction of the existing fuel terminal wharf began in the mid-1960s, with empowering legislation introduced in 1967. Tenders were called for the construction of the oil loading arms on the new wharf in 1973. In 2001, the wharf was equipped with an impressed current cathodic protection scheme to help prolong its life. The wharf was damaged in the 2016 Kaikōura earthquake, but was able to continue operating. In 2021 a $60m project commenced to improve the earthquake resistance of the wharf.

==== Burnham wharf ====
CentrePort owns Burnham wharf in Evans Bay, near the Miramar cutting. This wharf was built as a fuel terminal for the British Imperial Oil Company and opened in 1927. The wharf is currently used for receiving bulk aviation fuel for Wellington Airport. Fuel is piped from the wharf to storage tanks in Miramar, and then to the airport. The 2019 Wellington Lifelines Project reported that the wharf and the fuel infrastructure were reaching the end of their design lives, and were both vulnerable in an earthquake.

=== Harbour dredging ===
In 2015, CentrePort announced plans to dredge the entrance to the harbour, deepening the channel so that large container ships could use the port. A seven-kilometre-long trench would be dug, and the spoil dumped just outside the harbour entrance. Dredging would also be carried out at the Thorndon container wharf. The proposal would have changed the wave pattern at Eastbourne, and might have affected the Waiwhetu aquifer which lies under the harbour and supplies 40% of Wellington's fresh water. Concern was expressed that the project was not economically viable, and by 2019 it had been cancelled. However, dredging is sometimes carried out around CentrePort's wharves to remove sand build-up. In 2021 CentrePort dredged the shipping channel at the harbour entrance to remove sand build-up caused by propeller wash. This was the first time since 1968 that maintenance dredging had taken place in that area.

=== Health and safety record ===
CentrePort is a member of the Business Leaders Health and Safety Forum. The company has also contributed submissions for improvements to the regulatory framework for health and safety in New Zealand. However, there were fatal accidents at the port in 2013 and again in 2017.

== Economic significance of the port ==
An economic assessment of the impact of the port on the economy of central New Zealand conducted for the 2015 year reported a total of direct and indirect economic impact of $2.5 billion of GDP. The regions assessed for this study included Marlborough, Nelson and Tasman in the South Island, and Taranaki, Hawke's Bay, Manawatu-Whanganui and the Wellington Region in the North Island. The study found that the impact of the port supported over 9,000 direct full-time-equivalent positions across multiple sectors of the economy.

The Cook Strait ferries transport 4–5 million tonnes of cargo across Cook Strait each year, with an estimated value of $15–20 billion, representing around 30–40% of the total value of New Zealand's exports. There are over 1 million passenger journeys each year, and around a third of those are international tourists.

Cruise ship expenditure in Wellington increased from $35 million in 2016 to $53 million in the year to June 2020. This figure includes spending by both the vessel (on fuel, produce, fees) and visitors. The 2020 figure was lower than the previous year, because New Zealand shut its borders in March 2020 due to the COVID-19 pandemic.

== 2013 and 2016 earthquake damage and recovery ==
A big part of CentrePort's land is an area reclaimed between 1965 and 1975 for construction of the container terminal and Thorndon Wharf. In addition, earlier reclamation covered the remains of older wharves and a sea wall. Reclaimed areas were filled in with gravelly soil or dredged sand, then the surface was compacted and covered with asphalt.

The 2013 Seddon earthquake caused some damage at the port. An access road and a sea wall at the south end of the container area collapsed into the harbour, taking a container with them. Statistics House and BNZ Harbour Quays suffered minor damage including burst pipes and falling ceiling panels.

Due to the soft and mostly uncompacted nature of the land, the Kaikōura earthquake in November 2016 caused extensive damage to CentrePort's buildings and facilities. The earthquake caused widespread liquefaction at the container terminal, with sand and gravel appearing on the surface. Some of the filled-in area moved up to a metre sideways. Some areas settled or slumped, and cracks and buckling appeared in the asphalt. The lateral movement of the fill pushed the piles of Thorndon Wharf towards the sea, causing the wharf to tilt. King's Wharf was also pushed sideways. Over a dozen CentrePort buildings had to be demolished, including Shed 35, Shed 37, the Dimond building, the MSC building and the former NZ Rugby Union building. Shed 35 was a heritage-listed brick building built in 1915. In 2012, CentrePort had announced plans to turn it into a market and pub, but earthquake damage made this infeasible.

Two large gantry cranes used for moving shipping containers were put out of action for ten months after they jumped off their rails. This had a significant effect on the movement of freight in and out of Wellington. Transport costs for businesses increased as freight had to be diverted to other ports then shipped by road or rail to Wellington.

In the Harbour Quays area, floors in Statistics House partially collapsed. It was demolished in 2018. BNZ Harbour Quays had already been damaged in the 2013 Seddon earthquake. The 2016 earthquake caused structural damage that made the building unsafe, and it was demolished in 2019. The Customhouse suffered cracking to beams but it was repaired and some months after the earthquake was able to be reoccupied.

CentrePort received a $667 million insurance payout for earthquake damage. Repairs to Thorndon Container Wharf, including ground strengthening, cost $39 million. CentrePort drove almost 200 steel piles 40m into the soil to strengthen the area. More than 10,000 columns of stone were created by drilling into the ground around the perimeter of the site and filling the holes with crushed stone from buildings on site that had been demolished, and a grid reinforcing system was also laid down. These measures are expected to reduce liquefaction, strengthen the ground and stop it slipping sideways. The wharf repairs were completed in 2022 and allowed the company to increase the length of the wharf, from 125 m to 262 m.

== Ferry terminal and waterfront development ==
In 2020, following two years of discussion with stakeholders, Greater Wellington Regional Council announced that it had chosen Kaiwharawhara as its preferred site for a new ferry terminal. The terminal will be built on land owned by KiwiRail, CentrePort and the NZ Transport Agency. Interislander plans to introduce new hybrid electric ferries that are 30 metres (98 ft) longer than those currently in operation. The new terminal will be able to accommodate the larger ferries and will replace the two separate terminals currently used by StraitNZ and the Interislander. In addition, CentrePort will be able to make changes to the layout of its other port operations. The plan includes a wharf about 250 metres (820 ft) long, a ferry terminal building, changes to road, rail and pedestrian access, and marshalling and loading areas. The panel that approved the project called it the biggest rail capital project since World War 2.

Also in 2020, CentrePort announced that it wanted to create a new development in the area between the Thorndon container port and Waterloo Quay, the area it had previously called Harbour Quays. Development in this area would probably include low-rise residential, retail or office buildings, and public access to green spaces. CentrePort stated that ideas were still in the planning stage as a 'medium-term vision' and any development would probably be 10 years away.

== See also ==
- Reclamation of Wellington Harbour
- Wharves in Wellington Harbour
