= 2013 Seddon earthquake =

Earthquake in New Zealand

- Location within New Zealand
- UTC time: 2013-07-21 05:09:31
- ISC event: 603306074
- USGS-ANSS: ComCat
- Local date: 21 July 2013
- Local time: 5:09:30 pm NZST
- Magnitude: 6.5 M_{ww}
- Depth: 13 kilometres (8 mi)
- Epicentre: 41.61°S 174.33°E
- Areas affected: New Zealand
- Max. intensity: MMI VII (Very strong)
- Tsunami: None
- Casualties: 4 people injured

The 2013 Seddon earthquake measured 6.5 on the M_{ww} scale and was centred in New Zealand's Cook Strait, around 20 kilometres (12 mi) east of the town of Seddon in Marlborough. The earthquake struck at 5:09 pm on Sunday 21 July 2013 (05:09 UTC) at a depth of 13 kilometres (8 mi), according to GeoNet. The United States Geological Survey also measured the quake at 6.5, at a depth of 17 kilometres (11 mi). The quake caused moderate damage in the wider Marlborough area and Wellington, the nation's capital city 55 kilometres (34 mi) north of the epicentre. Only minor injuries were reported. Several aftershocks occurred during 21–29 July.

The Seddon earthquake is considered the first of an earthquake doublet, with a second earthquake of similar magnitude occurring on 16 August 2013.

== Earthquake ==
The earthquake occurred on a previously unknown fault.

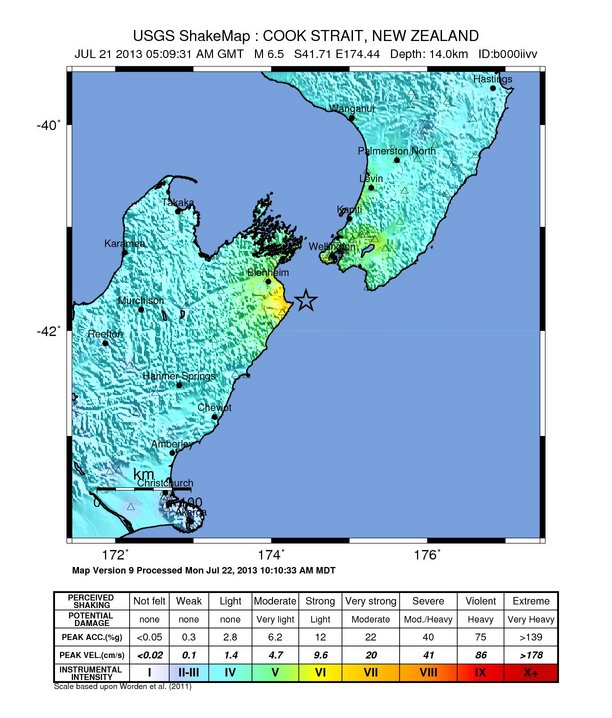
USGS Shakemap

=== Foreshocks ===
The earthquake was preceded by a series of foreshocks, the largest of which had a magnitude of 5.7.

Below is a list of all foreshocks magnitudes 5.0 and above that occurred in the region between 19 July 2013 and 21 July 2013.

Date (NZST)	Time (NZST)	Magnitude (M_{W})	Magnitude (M_{b})	Magnitude (M_{L})	Epicentre	Depth
19 July 2013	9:06:39 am	5.5	5.7	5.7	30 km east of Seddon	17 km
21 July 2013	7:17:10 am	5.9	5.8	5.8	30 km east of Seddon	20 km

=== Aftershocks ===
The earthquake generated a series of aftershocks, the largest of which had a magnitude of 5.4.

Below is a list of all aftershocks magnitudes 5.0 and above that occurred in the region between 21 July 2013 and 2 August 2013.

Date (NZST)	Time (NZST)	Magnitude (M_{W})	Magnitude (M_{b})	Magnitude (M_{L})	Epicentre	Depth
21 July 2013	5:09:30 pm	6.5	6.1	6.5	25 km east of Seddon	13 km
21 July 2013	5:13:50 pm		5.3	5.2	30 km east of Seddon	13 km
29 July 2013	1:07:14 am		4.9	5.4	20 km east of Seddon	12 km
2 August 2013	12:56:13 am		4.7	5.2	20 km east of Seddon	6 km

== Damage ==
The quake resulted in varying degrees of damage to 35 buildings within the Wellington CBD with glass from broken windows falling onto the main thoroughfares of Lambton Quay, Featherston Street, and Willis Street. Damage was also caused in Paraparaumu, Wainuiomata, Porirua and the Hutt Valley in the North Island. The earthquake caused some damage at the port of CentrePort Wellington. An access road and a sea wall at the south end of the container area collapsed into the harbour, taking a container with them. Statistics House and BNZ Harbour Quays suffered minor damage including burst pipes and falling ceiling panels. In December 2013, the Insurance Council of New Zealand (ICNZ) claimed that the insurance loss of this earthquake reached NZ$14.9 million (US$11.8 million).

The Wellington Region Emergency Management Office was activated on the evening of 21 July, as were those in the lower part of the North Island. On 22 July parts of Wellington's central business district were closed to the public to allow for inspections to buildings with damaged and potentially dangerous façades.

Four people were injured in the quake, which lasted for 20 seconds, blowing out windows, cracking concrete and swaying buildings.

To clean up the mess, a Facebook group of over 300 Wellington students was created, named Student Volunteer Army Wellington. It was inspired by the Student Volunteer Army in Christchurch, created in response to the 2011 Christchurch earthquake.

== Response ==
After the earthquake, the Wellington Region Emergency Management Office started organising a Long Walk Home event, where people walk 30 kilometres from central Wellington to Mana, to simulate a scenario in which roads and public transport are unusable. NIWA started a seabed survey three days after the earthquake.

== See also ==
- List of earthquakes in 2013
- List of earthquakes in New Zealand
- Marlborough fault system
- 1848 Marlborough earthquake
- 2013 Lake Grassmere earthquake
- 2016 Kaikōura earthquake
