= Liz MacPherson =

New Zealand statistician

Liz MacPherson was the Government Statistician and the Chief Executive of Statistics New Zealand from 2013 to 2019. She had previously served as Acting Chief Executive of the Ministry of Economic Development and Deputy Chief Executive Strategy and Governance at the Ministry of Business, Innovation and Employment.

She announced her resignation on 13 August 2019 following criticism of the 2018 New Zealand Census, and was asked by the Minister of Statistics to stay in the position 'until Christmas'.

In 2020 she joined the Office of the Privacy Commissioner as Deputy Commissioner.

Government offices
Preceded by Geoff Bascand	Government Statistician, New Zealand; 2013 – 2019	Succeeded by Mark Sowden
