= BNZ Harbour Quays =

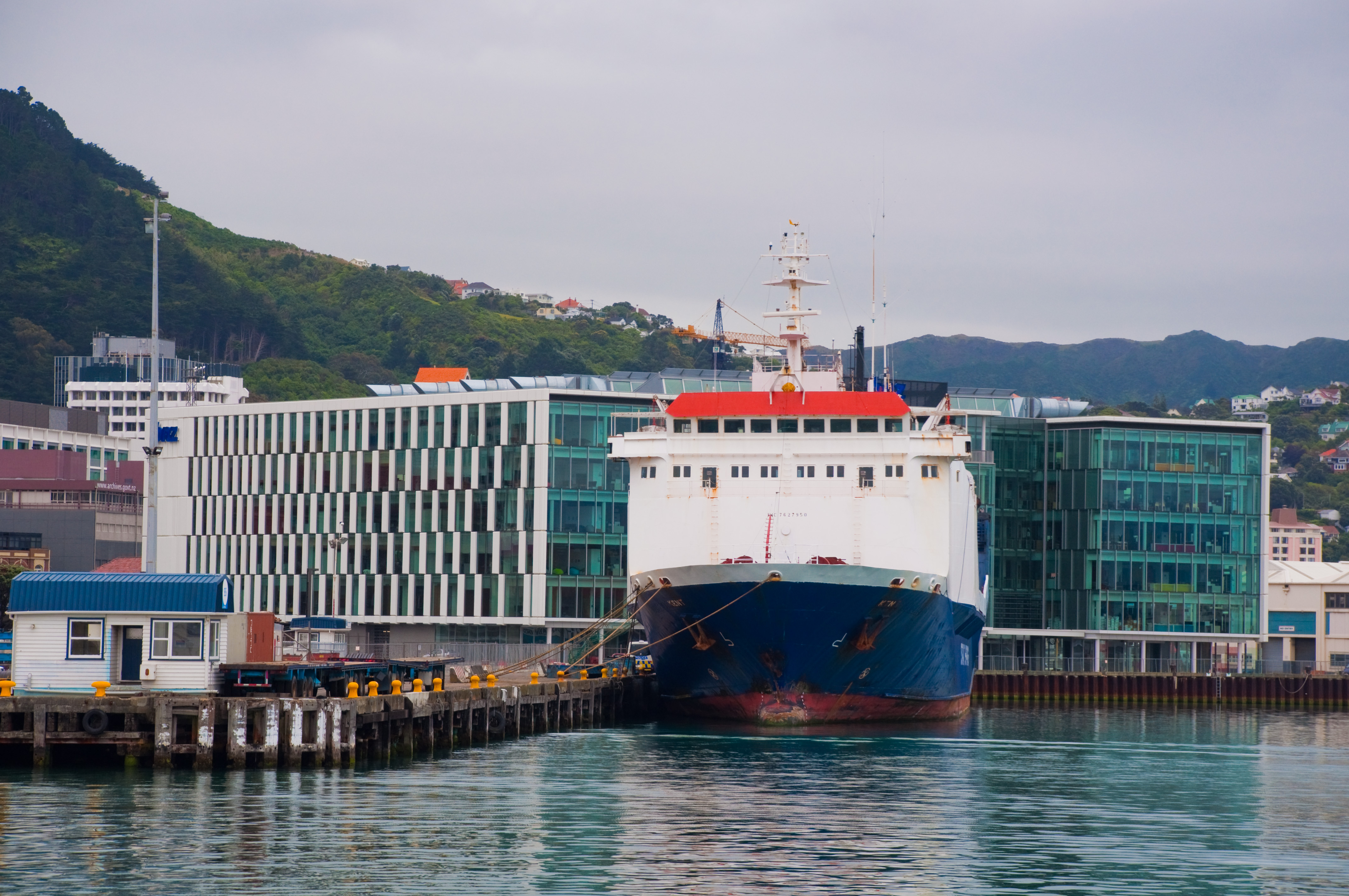
- The BNZ Harbour Quays building as seen in 2009, behind the ship in the foreground.
- Interactive map of the BNZ Harbour Quays area

General information
- Type: Office
- Architectural style: Modernism
- Location: 60 Waterloo Quay, Wellington, New Zealand
- Coordinates: 41°16′45″S 174°46′55″E
- Construction started: 2007
- Completed: 2009
- Demolished: 2019
- Owner: CentrePort

Height
- Height: 29 metres (95 ft)

Technical details
- Floor count: 6

Design and construction
- Architect: Jasmax
- Structural engineer: Beca Group
- Main contractor: Fletcher Construction
- Awards and prizes: NZIA Wellington Architecture Awards 2009

BNZ Harbour Quays was a large, award-winning office building on the waterfront in Wellington, New Zealand. It was built in 2009 and leased to the Bank of New Zealand, but suffered earthquake damage in the 2013 Seddon earthquake and the 2016 Kaikōura earthquake. The building was demolished in 2019.

== Harbour Quays project ==
The BNZ Harbour Quays building on the waterfront in Wellington was built by the port company, CentrePort, as part of its Harbour Quays project. The Harbour Quays project was launched in July 2005 with the aim of developing CentrePort's land along Waterloo Quay, between Bunny St and the Sky Stadium, into a business park with office buildings, retail and recreational spaces. CentrePort said there was space for up to 12 multi-storey buildings to house 4000 workers. The first new building in the project was Statistics House, completed in 2005 and demolished in 2018 following earthquake damage.

On 31 October 2006, Bank of New Zealand (BNZ) chairman Kerry McDonald signed a property development agreement with CentrePort, who would construct a large office building at 60 Waterloo Quay and lease it to the BNZ. The bank needed Overseas Investment Office approval for the lease because BNZ was owned by the National Australia Bank, and the Overseas Investment Office had jurisdiction on leases to foreigners of foreshore land lasting longer than three years. McDonald said that the BNZ was attracted to the location, the large floor plate and the focus on environmental sustainability that the building would offer and said the premium working conditions would attract good staff. CentrePort chairman Nigel Gould stated that "the building will transform what is currently largely a utility area into an integral part of the city's business centre and will help link it with the sea" and that the building would be a symbol of modern cultured Wellington. A group of Wellington business and property owners known as Vibrant Wellington opposed the Harbour Quays project, fearing that it would take thousands of workers out of the city centre. The group threatened court action over the resource consent issued for the BNZ building, but ultimately backed down. Spokesman Ian Cassels acknowledged that Harbour Quays "could be positive and really contribute to Wellington's future if it manages to adopt some of those mixed-use alternatives".

== Design and construction ==
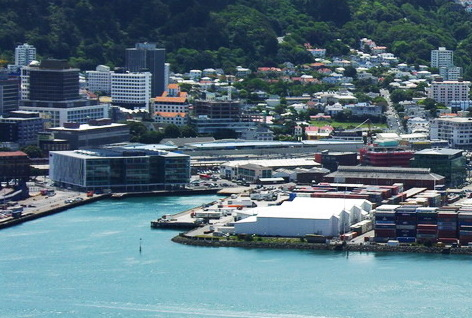
The BNZ Harbour Quays building (centre left) on Wellington's waterfront, 2009.

BNZ Harbour Quays was designed by Jasmax Ltd and constructed by Fletcher Construction on CentrePort land, with building largely completed by 2009. Beca were the engineers for the building, which was 29 metres (95 ft) high with foundations going down 15 metres (49 ft). It had 20,500 square metres (221,000 sq ft) of lettable space, of which 18,700 square metres (201,000 sq ft) was leased to the BNZ. About 1,100 BNZ staff were relocated to Harbour Quays from five separate locations in the city centre. Jasmax architect John Dennehy said the building was a Modernist design shaped by its location on reclaimed land, its purpose and environmental requirements. It consisted of three blocks six storeys high, separated by two atriums. The atriums had stairs and bridges to link the three blocks, and were designed "to create a greater sense of connection and increased opportunities for interaction by building users". The atriums were part of the building's ventilation system and allowed more natural light into office spaces. The building was designed so that it would gain a five-star Green Building Council certified status, and ultimately gained a six-star Office Interiors rating, the first building in New Zealand to do so.

The front of the building had façades with aluminium fins that created a wavy pattern, with lighting that dimmed and brightened every minute to suggest the ebb and flow of the tide. The façade on the north side was covered in aluminium panels to stop heat getting in, and the cladding on the south side was designed to reduce heat loss. The building had water tanks to collect rainwater, waterless urinals and a lighting system that would reduce lighting use in daylight and turn off lights when a room was not being used. There were 30 car parks and 75 parking spaces for bicycles. BNZ Harbour Quays won awards in three categories — commercial, sustainable and interior — at the New Zealand Institute of Architects Wellington Architecture Awards in 2009. Jurors praised its ecological and social considerations and strong sculptural elements, with the convenor saying it was "like a mini city".

== 2013 earthquake damage ==
On 21 July 2013 the building was damaged by the Seddon earthquake. The top floor of the central building was topped by a concrete pad but the two outer buildings were steel-framed and had higher roof cavities which meant they moved more in the earthquake. This caused ceilings on the top floors of the outer buildings to collapse under the weight of air conditioning ducts and sprinkler pipes. The pipes burst, causing extensive flooding through the buildings and damaging cabling. Though extensive, the damage was non-structural. CentrePort's then chairman Warren Larsen declared that the building had not failed, saying: "That building was built to the highest possible standards and, structurally, it delivered exactly in the way the engineer said it would, but it's these internal fitting issues that have caused the damage". The building was unusable for nine months while engineers worked out how to install and brace building services, and cables and carpets also had to be replaced. The cost of repairs was estimated to be about $10 million. Most staff had moved back into the building by April 2014.

== 2016 earthquake damage ==
BNZ Harbour Quays was damaged again in the 14 November 2016 Kaikōura earthquake. CentrePort and BNZ were initially reticent about the exact nature of the damage to the building, and staff entering to fetch belongings were required to give up their phones so that they couldn't take photos. Media reported "extensive damage": windows and doors had broken or popped out of their frames and ceiling panels were damaged. Later investigation found cracks and spalling in beams and columns which in some cases exposed the reinforcing within the beams, sagging concrete floor slabs, and major damage to the curtain walling on the façades. BNZ stated for months that staff would return to Harbour Quays, but on 26 March 2018 announced that it would not return to the building and was exiting its lease. Some BNZ employees said they were glad to be out of the building due to its location far from the CBD and ongoing concerns about earthquake resilience.

== Demolition ==
In October 2018 CentrePort announced that BNZ Harbour Quays would be demolished. The company considered imploding the building but decided that would be dangerous for nearby businesses. Instead, the company opted to deconstruct and recycle the building, which took over a year. This cost more and took longer than ordinary demolition, but offered safety for public access near the site and for the Bluebridge ferry company nearby. CentrePort said that 30,000 tonnes of concrete in the building would be crushed for use as gravel fill at the port, glass panels and exterior panels would be reused in other buildings and other material would be salvaged or recycled.

== Aftermath ==
In 2018, Radio New Zealand asked Wellington City Council if they had obtained any engineering advice about the design of BNZ Harbour Quays before its construction. The Council responded that it had hired structural engineers Spencer Holmes to review Beca's design, and that Spencer Holmes' concerns had been addressed. Spencer Holmes refuted the Council's statement, saying they had questions about structural steel calculations, thickness of the concrete floors and how they were held up, and how the building's frame would perform in an earthquake. Spencer Holmes said that in 2007 they had withdrawn from reviewing Beca's design because their questions were not answered fully. Professor John Mander had then peer-reviewed the design.

In 2019, BNZ sued the Wellington City Council for over $100 million for negligence, for granting building consents and issuing code compliance certificates when there were concerns about the building's design. The City Council then filed a claim against Beca, but Beca denied any liability. The High Court would not dismiss the claim against Beca, so Beca appealed to the Court of Appeal, but that Court upheld the High Court's decision. The dispute between Beca and Wellington City Council was heard by the Supreme Court in 2024, with the court dismissing Beca's legal defence that the Building Act limited civil proceedings arising from building work to only be heard within 10 years of the work being undertaken. The Supreme Court ruled that if Wellington City Council loses its case against the BNZ, it may still ask Beca for a contribution towards BNZ's claim.

The failure of BNZ Harbour Quays, Statistics House and other Wellington buildings that were damaged in the 2016 Kaikōura earthquake led to revision of seismic assessment guidelines. The Ministry of Business, Industry and Employment (MBIE) released The Seismic Assessment of Existing Buildings, commonly known as the Red Book, in July 2017. These guidelines provide "a technical basis for engineers to carry out seismic assessments of existing buildings". Section C5 deals with assessment of multi-storey concrete buildings. In 2018, section C5 was revised because understanding of building performance in the Kaikōura earthquake had changed. The revised section is known as the Yellow Book or Yellow Chapter. Assessment using the Yellow Book can lead to different results from assessment using the Red Book, but only the Red Book has legal standing. The differences in the two versions of the guidelines have led to confusion and frustration for building owners and engineers and contributed to a shortage of commercial rental properties in Wellington, as renters demand seismically safe buildings.
