= Keith Newman (writer) =

New Zealand author, freelance writer and producer

- Born: 6 June 1954 (age 72); Palmerston North, New Zealand
- Occupations: Author, freelance writer and producer
- Spouse: Paula Newman
- Children: 2
- Writing career
- Genre: Non-fiction
- Notable works: Bible & Treaty: Missionaries Among the Maori
- Website: www.bibleandtreaty.co.nz

Keith Newman (born 6 June 1954) is a New Zealand author, freelance writer and producer. He has had five non-fiction titles published dealing with historical subjects including Māori prophet T. W. Ratana and the movement he founded, the early missionaries and their relationships with the Māori people and a history of the Internet in New Zealand.

== Early life and career ==
Newman was raised in Feilding in the central North Island of New Zealand. He lived in Auckland for 25 years before moving to Hawke's Bay in 2009. He has worked in newspapers, magazines and radio for over 30 years, winning awards for journalism and feature writing.

== Author ==
After 20 years of research, in 2006 Reed published Newman's book Ratana Revisited – An Unfinished Legacy. Two years later he was asked by Penguin, which took over Reed Publishing, to write a condensed and more focused version which was published as Ratana – The Prophet in 2009. Newman also wrote the article in Te Ara, the New Zealand Government online encyclopaedia, about the Ratana movement.

In between he was commissioned by InternetNZ to write the history of the Internet in New Zealand. The resulting book Connecting the Clouds – The Internet in New Zealand (Activity Press 2008) is also published as a wiki and available free under a Creative Commons license.

In 2009 Penguin published his book Bible & Treaty: Missionaries Among the Maori, and have since released a second edition. The follow-up companion title Beyond Betrayal: Trouble in the Promised Land was published in September 2013.

In 2018 he received a New Zealand History Award to support the writing of Hidden Heritage of the Cape Coast, which focuses on the Māori, colonial and more recent history of the coastal Hawke's Bay settlements of Haumoana, Te Awanga and Clifton.

== Radio journalism ==
Newman has written, produced and narrated over 20 programmes for Radio New Zealand National's Musical Chairs series, mainly dealing with pop and rock musicians from the period of the 1960s and 1970s, predominantly those who had recording success locally and toured offshore.

== Environmental action ==
Newman is the chairman of the WOW (Walking on Water) lobby group, which is particularly concerned with coastal erosion in the Haumoana beach area where he lives.

== Awards ==
- New Zealand History Award, Ministry for Culture and Heritage, 2018
- The Swaytech Journalist Award, PricewaterhouseCoopers Hi-Tech Awards 2009
- New Zealand Radio Awards: Blerta Years, Radio New Zealand National, Best Produced Music Feature, 2007
- Best Magazine Feature Writer, IC&T, Qantas Media Awards 2004
- Journalist of the Year 2004, Telecommunications Users Association of New Zealand (TUANZ)

== Publications ==
- Ratana Revisited – An Unfinished Legacy (Raupo/Reed 2006) ISBN 9780790010571
- Connecting the Clouds – the Internet in New Zealand (Activity Press / InternetNZ 2008) ISBN 0958263442
- Ratana the Prophet (Raupo-Penguin 2009) ISBN 9780143010975
- Bible & Treaty: Missionaries Among the Maori (Penguin 2010) ISBN 978-0143204084
- Beyond Betrayal: Trouble in the Promised Land (Penguin 2013) ISBN 9780143570516
