= List of Nudgee College Old Boys =

This is a List of Nudgee College Old Boys, who are notable former students of St Joseph's College, Nudgee in Brisbane, Queensland, Australia.

Alumni of St Joseph's Nudgee College are known as Old Boys, and automatically become members of the school's alumni association, the Nudgee College Old Boys Association (NCOBA).

== Academia, medicine and science ==
- Dr Prof John Boldeman – nuclear scientist, best known for his work on the ANTARES Tandem Accelerator and the Australian synchrotron
- Francis Patrick Donovan AM – 1946 Rhodes scholar
- Neal Macrossan – 1907 Rhodes scholar
- Dr Harry Windsor – Australia's first heart transplant surgeon

== Arts, entertainment and music ==
- Jacob Elordi – artist
- Ron Grainer – composer
- Pete Murray – singer-songwriter

== Business ==
- Ian Rice – property developer and former president of Carlton Blues

== Politics, public service and the law ==
- Archbishop John Bathersby – former Catholic Archbishop of Brisbane, 1991–2011
- Kevin Byrne – former Mayor of Cairns, 2000–2008
- Cameron Caldwell – Federal Member for Fadden
- The Hon Hugh Denis Macrossan – former State MLA, 1912–1915 and Chief Justice of Queensland, 1940
- Neal Macrossan – former Chief Justice of Queensland, 1946–1955
- The Hon John Muir – former Justice of Appeal, Supreme Court of Queensland (retired 27 December 2014)
- Ted O'Brien – Federal Member for Fairfax
- Neil O'Sullivan – former Leader of the Liberal Party in the Senate, 1950–1958
- The Hon Warwick Parer – former Senator and Minister, 1984–2000
- Tom Quilty – former pastoralist, philanthropist, and bush poet
- The Hon Mark Ryan – State Member for Morayfield, 2009–2012, 2015–current; Minister for Police 2016–2024
- Mick Veivers – former coalition government minister, and rugby league football player
- Terry White – former Liberal Party leader in Queensland and founder of Terry White Chemists
- Ivan Orola – prominent partner at HWLE

== Sport ==
- Jason Akermanis – Australian rules football player
- Leith Brodie – swimmer, bronze medallist at the 2008 Beijing Olympics
- Joe Burns – cricket player
- Lionel Cox – cyclist, gold and silver medallist at the 1952 Helsinki Olympics
- Michael Cresswell – basketball player for Cairns Marlins
- Rocky Elsom – rugby union football player
- Elton Flatley – rugby union football player
- Josh Flook – rugby union football player
- Nicholas Hall – jockey
- Sean Hardman – rugby union football player
- Nathan Hauritz – cricket player
- Peter Hewat – rugby union football player
- Damian Istria – gymnast, gold and silver medallist at the 2006 Commonwealth Games
- Mark Loane – rugby union football player
- Chris Lynn – cricket player
- Paul McLean – rugby union football player
- Jack McLoughlin – 1500m Freestyle, 2016 Rio Olympics
- Sean McMahon – rugby union football player
- Hugh McMeniman – rugby union football player
- Nathan McSweeney – cricket player
- Jimmy Maher – cricket player
- James O'Connor – rugby union football player for the Australian Wallabies
- Brenton Rickard – swimmer, silver medallist at the 2008 Beijing Olympics
- Dom Shipperley – rugby union football player
- Mitchell Swepson – cricket player
- William Martin – Paralympic Swimmer
- Ethan Bullemor – rugby league football player
- Robert Toia – rugby league football player
- Daniel Atkinson – rugby league football player

== See also ==
- Catholic education in Australia
