= Roy Cameron =

Roy Cameron may refer to:

- Sir Roy Cameron (pathologist), Australian pathologist
- Sir Roy Cameron (police officer), Scottish police officer
- Roy Cameron (statistician), Australian public servant and diplomat
