= Edward Ronald Walker =

Australian diplomat and economist (1907–1988)

Sir Edward Ronald Walker CBE
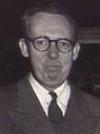
- Walker in 1952
- Born: 26 January 1907; Cobar, New South Wales, Australia
- Died: 28 November 1988 (aged 81); Paris, France
- Education: University of Sydney (BA, MA); University of Cambridge (PhD, LittD)
- Occupations: Diplomat and economist
- Spouse: Louise Clementine Donckers

Sir Edward Ronald Walker CBE (26 January 1907 – 28 November 1988) was an Australian diplomat and economist who served as Australia's Permanent Representative to the United Nations and Ambassador to Germany, Japan, and France.

== Early life and education ==
Walker was born on 26 January 1907 in Cobar, New South Wales the, eldest child of Frederick Thomas Walker, a Methodist minister, and Mary Melvina Annie Walker, née King. Born into a prominent family in the Methodist movement, Walker's mother was also the daughter of a Methodist minister and his paternal cousin was the Methodist minister and social activist Sir Alan Walker. Nevertheless, Walker, on account of his family circumstances, had to leave school at an early age and later matriculated to Fort Street Boys’ High School. After finishing high school, in 1924 Walker won a Teachers College scholarship to the University of Sydney, graduating with a Bachelor of Arts (BA) in 1927 and then a Master of Arts (MA) in 1930 in economics and psychology. In 1927 Walker was given a lecturing position in economics by Sydney University and in 1930 was appointed acting-Dean of the Faculty of Economics.

After graduating with first class honours from his master's degree, Walker worked with Robert Madgwick to publish an economics textbook "An Outline of Australian Economics" (published 1932). On account of his academic success, Walker was also awarded a Rockefeller Foundation scholarship in 1931 and entered St John’s College, Cambridge, studying for a doctorate in economics. While at Cambridge Walker joined the Political Economy Club, which included amongst its founders John Maynard Keynes, and he became a firm adherent to Keynes' ideas on economics throughout his life. His doctoral dissertation, entitled "Australia in the World Depression", was supervised by Dennis Robertson and Arthur Cecil Pigou and at award in 1933 was the second PhD in economics at Cambridge. On 8 April 1933, at Beaumont, Belgium, Walker married Louise Clementine Donckers, a schoolteacher.

== Academic career ==
On his return to Australia, Walker resumed his position as a lecturer in economics at the University of Sydney from 1933. Walker later made an appearance before the 1936-37 Royal Commission on Monetary and Banking Systems, which was established by the Federal Government of Joseph Lyons to examine potential changes to the banking sector. At the royal commission, Walker argued that monetary policy should have two objectives: "the avoidance or mitigation of depressions" and "the stabilization of the purchasing power of money". Impressed by his submissions, the Commonwealth Government sent Walker to Geneva as a delegate to the League of Nations in 1937 and on his return to Australia in 1938 he was appointed an economic adviser to the New South Wales Treasury.

He served the NSW Treasury in this capacity until in March 1939, he was appointed to succeed Frank Mauldon as Professor of Economics at the University of Tasmania and also as an economic adviser to the Tasmanian Government. With the outbreak of war, Walker studied many aspects of Australia's economy under wartime conditions and regulation. In December 1941 he was appointed chief economic adviser and later deputy director-general of the newly established Department of War Organization of Industry in Melbourne. Walker was also appointed a member of the Commonwealth Advisory Committee on Finance and Economic Policy. In office as Professor of Economics until 1946, in 1949 Walker was awarded the degree of Doctor of Letters (Litt.D) by Cambridge University in recognition of his prolific publications on the Australian war economy.

== Diplomatic career ==
With the end of the war, Walker's government position was abolished, and was sent by the Commonwealth to be chief of the country programs branch of the United Nations Relief and Rehabilitation Administration in Washington, DC. With the abolition of that body however in 1947, Walker joined the Department of External Affairs and was sent to be a counsellor at the Australian legation in Paris, with special responsibility for economic matters at the Paris Peace Conference. While in Paris, Walker was involved in the establishment of the United Nations Educational, Scientific and Cultural Organization (UNESCO), serving as chairman on the first executive board (1948–1950) and was elected to serve as chairman of the UNESCO finance committee in 1949–1950. In 1948 he was also appointed as Australia's representative on the United Nations Economic and Social Council until 1950. He remained in Paris until 1950, when he returned to Australia to take up an appointment as an Executive member of the National Security Resources Board, which had been established following the outbreak of the Korean War.

Walker served on the board until mid-1952 when he was appointed Australia’s first Ambassador of Australia to Japan, charged with rebuilding Australia's relations with Japan since the war. Serving until 1956, Walker's next posting was to New York as Australia’s Permanent Representative to the United Nations. On 12 January 1956 he presented his credentials to UN Secretary-General Dag Hammarskjöld. During his time at the UN, Australia held a non-permanent seat on the United Nations Security Council (1956–1957) and during Australia's term the council dealt with such matters as the Suez Crisis and the Soviet invasion of Hungary. Walker himself served as President of the Council twice, in June 1956 and June 1957. Walker also served as Australia's representative on the United Nations Trusteeship Council (1956–1958).

Walker's next posting was back to Paris in 1959 as Ambassador to France, and while there was appointed again to represent Australia on the United Nations Economic and Social Council (1962–1964) and was elected president of that body in 1964. While serving as ambassador in Paris until 1968, Walker's UN work increased, leading technical missions to Tunisia and Pakistan in 1965 and 1968 respectively. From 1964 to 1975, Walker was a member of the UN Advisory Committee on the Application of Science and Technology for Development (which later became the Commission on Science and Technology for Development), and was its chairman in 1970. In August 1968 Walker was sent to Bonn to be Ambassador to the Federal Republic of Germany, serving until June 1971, when he was sent back to Paris as Australia's first Permanent Representative to the Organisation for Economic Co-operation and Development (OECD). He served in this last posting until his retirement in 1973.

== Later life and death ==
In his retirement Walker continued to live with his wife Louise in France, occasionally writing articles on economic matters for the Canberra Times. Survived by his wife, son, and daughter Walker died aged 81 on 28 November 1988 in Paris and was buried in Hellenvilliers cemetery, Normandy. His obituary in the Canberra Times on 1 December noted that he was "a jovial man, not given to ambition but with a talent for tackling demanding jobs with an air of good-natured charm. He enjoyed the diplomatic life with style."

== Awards and honours ==
In May 1956 Walker was appointed a Commander of the Order of the British Empire (CBE). In June 1963 Walker became a Knight Bachelor.

On 2 October 1973 Walker was awarded the honorary degree of Doctor of Science in Economics (Hon.D.Sc.) by the University of Sydney.

In March 2010, Ronald Walker Street in Casey, Canberra, was named in his honour.

== Publications ==
- Edward Ronald Walker; Robert Bowden Madgwick (1932). An Outline of Australian Economics. Sydney & Melbourne: Whitcombe & Tombs. p. 248.
- Edward Ronald Walker (1933). Australia in the World Depression (Thesis). London: King. p. 219.
- Edward Ronald Walker; Richard Charles Mills (1935). Money. Sydney: Angus and Robertson. p. 219.
- Edward Ronald Walker (1936). Unemployment policy: with special reference to Australia. Sydney: Angus & Robertson. p. 258.
- Edward Ronald Walker; Roy Maitland Beecroft (1941). New developments in Australia's war economy. Melbourne: Melbourne University Press. p. 20.
- R. G. Osborne; Edward Ronald Walker (1941). Federalism in Canada : a review of the report of the Royal Commission on Dominion-Provincial Relations, 1940. Melbourne: Melbourne University Press. p. 15.
- Edward Ronald Walker (December 1941). Total war-with reservations: Australia's war economy, May to October, 1941. Melbourne: Melbourne University Press. p. 16.
- Edward Ronald Walker; Roy Maitland Beecroft (1942). Changes in the stock of Australian money. Melbourne: Melbourne University Press. p. 8. OCLC 225930703.
- Edward Ronald Walker (1943). The transformation of war-time controls. Realities of reconstruction. Melbourne: Melbourne University Press in association with Oxford University Press. p. 24.
- Edward Ronald Walker (1943). From economic theory to policy. Chicago: University of Chicago Press. p. 273.
- Edward Ronald Walker (1947). The Australian economy in war and reconstruction. New York: Oxford University Press. p. 426.

Academic offices
Preceded by Prof. Frank Mauldon	Professor of Economics at the University of Tasmania; 1939 – 1946	Succeeded by Prof. Kenneth Dallas (acting)
Diplomatic posts
Preceded by William Roy Hodgson as Minister to Japan	Ambassador of Australia to Japan; 1952 – 1955	Succeeded by Alan Watt
Preceded by Bill Forsyth	Permanent Representative of Australia to the United Nations; 1956 – 1959	Succeeded by James Plimsoll
Preceded by Jože Brilej	President of the United Nations Security Council; June 1956	Succeeded by Josef Nisot
Preceded by Henry Cabot Lodge Jr.	President of the United Nations Security Council; June 1957	Succeeded by Tsiang Tingfu
Preceded by Alfred Stirling	Ambassador of Australia to France; 1959 – 1968	Succeeded by Alan Renouf
Preceded by Alfonso Patino	President of the United Nations Economic and Social Council; 1964	Succeeded by Akira Matsui
Preceded by Frederick Blakeney	Ambassador of Australia to Germany; 1968 – 1971	Succeeded by Ralph Harry
New title	Permanent Representative of Australia to the OECD; 1971 – 1973	Succeeded by Roy Cameron
