= 1966 Australian census =

First Australian national population census

Seventh commonwealth census
- 30 June 1966; 60 years ago

General information
- Country: Commonwealth of Australia
- Authority: Bureau of Census and Statistics
- Website: abs.gov.au (1966)

Results
- Total population: 11,550,462 (▲9.9%)
- Most populous state or territory: New South Wales (4,233,822)
- Least populous state or territory: Northern Territory (37,433)

The 1966 Australian census was the seventh national population census held in Australia and was conducted by the Bureau of Census and Statistics. The day used for the census, was taken on 30 June 1966. The total population of the Commonwealth of Australia was counted as 11,550,462 – an increase of 1,042,276 people or 9.92% over the 1961 census.

Census results were released under statistician J. P. O'Neill in a series of three publications beginning in April 1967 with a summary of the population.

== Topics ==
Key topics in 1966 included:

- Age
- Marital status
- Birthplace
- Religion
- Race/Origin
- Education (highest level of schooling)
- Occupation
- Industry
- Housing details (dwelling type, material, and motor vehicles.)
- Location

== Population and dwellings ==
The population counts for Australian states and territories were that New South Wales remains the most populous state, with 4,233,822 people counted, ahead of Victoria (3,219,526) and Queensland (1,663,685). Australian Capital Territory (ACT) experienced the largest average annual growth rate of any state or territory over the past five years, with an average annual increase of 10.29% while Tasmania had the smallest growth at 1.18% since the 1961 census. Persons count based on place of usual residence on Census night.

States and territories		Males	Females	Total	% change since 1961
Flag of New South Wales	New South Wales	2,124,462	2,109,360	4,233,822	▲8.1%
Flag of Victoria (state)	Victoria	1,613,904	1,605,622	3,219,526	▲9.8%
Flag of Queensland	Queensland	843,897	819,788	1,663,685	▲9.6%
Flag of Western Australia	Western Australia	426,691	409,982	836,673	▲12.0%
Flag of South Australia	South Australia	548,530	543,345	1,091,875	▲12.2%
Flag of Tasmania	Tasmania	187,390	184,045	371,435	▲6.0%
Flag of Australian Capital Territory	Australian Capital Territory	49,977	46,036	96,013	▲63.2%
Flag of Australia	Northern Territory (Note: The Northern Territory since 1911 used the Australian National Flag (the Blue Ensign) and did not adopt its own flag until 1978.)	21,508	15,925	37,433	▲33.3%
Australia		5,816,359	5,734,103	11,550,462	▲9.9%

=== Age ===
Age	1966
Age	Number
0–4 years	1,143,144
5–9 years	1,162,896
10–14 years	1,086,448
15–19 years	1,048,226
20–24 years	853,941
25–29 years	746,065
30–34 years	687,354
35–39 years	764,562
40–44 years	773,751
45–49 years	677,672
50–54 years	641,634
55–59 years	543,016
60–64 years	435,349
65–69 years	356,396
70–74 years	275,971
75–79 years	196,387
80–84 years	102,864
85–89 years	41,621
90–94 years	10,976
95–99 years	2005
100 and over	184
Total	11,550,462

== Single characteristics ==
=== Race ===
At the seventh Australian census in 1966 the population was self-enumeration. In the official sense, the Commonwealth Bureau of Census and Statistics, which collected demographic data, defined the term "European" to "cover those ethnic or racial groups (e.g. Caucasian, Slavonic, Celtic, Latin) which have their origins in the countries of Europe while terms such as "Afghan", "Filipino", etc. cover those ethnic groups normally to be found in the countries of Afghanistan and the Philippines, etc.". The 1966 census enumeration of Aboriginals (full-blood) progressively made significant effort for those in contact and out of contact with population centres.

Race	Population	Percent (%)
European (Note: Persons of over 50 per cent European race.)	11,453,375	98.74
Non-European (Note: Persons of more than 50 per cent of the race specified, or of 50 per cent of the race specified and 50 per cent European.)		
Afghan	89	0.00
Arab, Persian	1321	0.01
Asiatic Jew	243	0.00
Asiatic	2636	0.02
African	601	0.00
Australian Aboriginal (Note: The figures in this bulletin relate to those persons who described themselves in the 1966 Census as being 50 per cent or more Aboriginal or simply as "Aboriginal"."CENSUS OF THE COMMONWEALTH OF AUSTRALIA 30 JUNE 1966 THE ABORIGINAL POPULATION OF AUSTRALIA" (PDF). COMMONWEALTH BUREAU OF CENSUS AND STATISTICS.)	80,207	0.69
Chinese	26,723	0.23
Sinhalese, Burgher, Tamil	1,679	0.01
Egyptian	425	0.00
Fijian	257	0.00
Filipino	765	0.00
Indian, Pakistani	4,411	0.03
Indonesian, Javanese, Timorese, etc.	818	0.00
Japanese	3,573	0.03
Malay	1,749	0.01
Māori	862	0.00
Negro	102	0.00
Pacific Islander	3,005	0.02
Papuan, New Guinean	502	0.00
Siamese, Thailander	562	0.00
Syrian, Lebanese, New Guinean	4,855	0.04
Torres Strait Islander	5,403	0.04
Other and indefinite	523	0.00
Mixed blood (Note: Persons of three or more races where no race represents more than 50 per cent or persons of two non- European races each of which represents 50 per cent.)	4,812	0.04
Total non-European (Note: Persons of more than 50 per cent of the race specified, or of 50 per cent of the race specified and 50 per cent European.)	146,123	1.26
Grand total	11,599,498	100.0

=== Religion ===
Population by religious affiliation according to the 1966 census results.

Religion	1966 census	
Religion	Number	Percent (%)
Christian	10,205,038	88.35
Church of England	3,877,473	33.57
Presbyterians	1,043,570	9.03
Methodists	1,124,310	9.73
Baptist	165,487	1.43
Congregational	76,588	0.66
Lutheran	177,324	1.53
Church of Christ	102,545	0.88
Orthodox	255,493	2.21
Brethren	15,516	0.13
Salvation Army	56,501	0.48
Seventh-day Adventist	37,617	0.32
Protestant (undefined)	105,223	0.91
Roman Catholic	1,103,969	9.56
Catholic	1,932,161	16.73
Other (including Christian undefined)	131,261	1.14
Non-Christian	76,383	0.66
Hebrew	63,271	0.54
Others	13,112	0.11
Indefinite	36,050	0.31
No religion	94,091	0.81
No reply	1,138,900	9.86
Grand total	11,550,462	100.0

== See also ==
- 2026 Australian census
- 2021 Australian census
- 2016 Australian census
- 1911 Australian census
- Census in Australia
