= William Cole (public servant) =

Australian public servant (1926–2019)

Sir William Cole

Secretary of the Department of Defence
- In office 6 February 1984 – 15 October 1986
- Preceded by: Bill Pritchett
- Succeeded by: Alan Woods

Secretary of the Department of Finance
- In office 7 December 1976 – 2 November 1978
- Preceded by: New department
- Succeeded by: Ian Castles

Personal details
- Born: Robert William Cole; 16 September 1926 Melbourne, Victoria, Australia
- Died: 8 January 2019 (aged 92) Perth, Western Australia
- Education: University of Melbourne
- Occupation: Public servant

Sir Robert William Cole (16 September 1926 – 8 January 2019) was a senior Australian public servant. He held secretary-level positions in four departments or agencies during the Fraser government and Hawke government years.

== Background ==
Cole was born in 1926 in Melbourne. His parents were James Cole and Rita Tassie. He had two younger siblings, Geoff and Barbara. He attended Northcote High School but left school in 1941. He began his public-service career at the age of 15 as a telegraph messenger. In 1944, he was conscripted in and served in the Royal Australian Air Force during World War II ending in service's postal division. After being demobilised, he returned to his previous work at the Department of Supply in Melbourne.

In 1948, taking advantage of the Labor government's Commonwealth Reconstruction Training Scheme, he completed his high school years 11 and 12. This allowed him to attend and completed a commerce degree at the University of Melbourne.

After graduating, Cole briefly worked in the Department of Supply, and then in 1952 moved to Canberra to work as a research officer in the Department of the Treasury. He was seconded to the International Monetary Fund in 1957 and worked in Washington, D.C., until 1959, when he returned to the Treasury. He was director of the Bureau of Transport Economics from 1970 to 1972, and then took on various senior roles:

- first Assistant Secretary to the Treasury (1972–76)
- Australian Statistician (1976)
- Secretary of the Department of Finance (1976–78)
- Chairman of the Public Service Board (1978–83) and
- Secretary of the Department of Defence (1984–87).

== Marriage ==
He met his wife Margaret Martin in Canberra; they were married in November 1956. They had two children.

== Honours ==
Cole was knighted in the 1981 New Year Honours.

Government offices
| Preceded by Jack O'Neill | Australian Statistician; 1976 | Succeeded by Roy Cameron |
| New title Department established | Secretary of the Department of Finance; 1976–1978 | Succeeded by Ian Castles |
| Preceded by Mick Shann | Chairman of the Public Service Board; 1978–1983 | Succeeded by Peter Wilenski |
| Preceded by Bill Pritchett | Secretary of the Department of Defence; 1984–1986 | Succeeded by Alan Woods |
