= 2021 Australian census =

Eighteenth Australian national Census of Population and Housing

2021 Census
- 10 August 2021; 5 years ago

General information
- Country: Australia
- Topics: Census topics: Location; Sex and gender; Households and families; Indigenous Australians; Income and work; Unpaid work and care; Education and training; Disability and carers; Cultural diversity; Religion
- Trial census: 27 October 2020
- Authority: Australian Bureau of Statistics
- Website: census.abs.gov.au

Results
- Total population: 25,422,788 (▲8.6%)
- Most populous state or territory: New South Wales (8,072,163)
- Least populous state or territory: Jervis Bay Territory (310)

The 2021 Australian census was the eighteenth national Census of Population and Housing in Australia. The 2021 Census took place on 10 August 2021, and was conducted by the Australian Bureau of Statistics (ABS). It had a response rate of 96.1%, up from the 95.1% at the 2016 census. The total population of the Commonwealth of Australia was counted as 25,422,788, an increase of 8.6 per cent or 2,020,896 people over the previous 2016 census.

Results from the 2021 census were released to the public on 28 June 2022 from the Australian Bureau of Statistics website. A small amount of additional 2021 census data was released in October 2022 and in 2023. Australia's next census took place on 11 August 2026.

The census was undertaken during the COVID-19 pandemic. It therefore provided a clear snapshot of how the pandemic impacted Australian society.

== Overview ==
In Australia, completing the census is compulsory for all people in Australia on census night, only excluding foreign diplomats and their families. Census data is used to "help governments, businesses, not-for-profit and community organisations across the country make informed decisions", including helping governments to plan the provision of services. An independent report from Lateral Economics found that for every $1 of investment on the census, $6 of benefits are created in the Australian economy.

Since the 2001 Census, all households have the option of allowing their census data, including personal information such as names and addresses, to be stored by the National Archives of Australia (NAA) for 99 years. 99 years after Census Night, the NAA will release that data to the public in a Census Time Capsule. Censuses stored by the NAA cannot by accessed, amended, or retrieved by anyone, including courts and tribunal, until their release, the first of which will occur in 2100.

The 2020 Census Test occurred on 27 October 2020 with around 100,000 households from Sydney, Adelaide, Darwin, and Canberra, as well as communities in Karratha, Warrnambool, and Alice Springs Town Camps.

== Topics ==
Every census, the ABS makes a recommendation to the Australian Government on the topics to be included, based on the benefit that data would provide to Australia. Through the Census and Statistics Amendment (Statistical Information) Regulations 2020, the federal parliament approves topics that may be included. For the 2021 census, the ABS had been authorised to include questions relating to long-term health conditions and service in the Australian Defence Force, and would not continue asking questions about home internet access considering the rise of mobile devices. This represented the first significant change to census topics since 2006.

Alongside these two new topics, the 2021 Census continued to ask questions related to:

- Population
- Sex and gender
- Households and families
- Aboriginal and Torres Strait Islander peoples
- Income and work
- Unpaid work and care
- Education and training
- Disability and carers
- Housing
- Location
- Transport
- Cultural diversity
- Religion

=== Consultations ===
Through late 2017, the ABS began discussions with major census data users on what was needed. From 3 April to 30 June 2018, a formal consultation process occurred on the online "ABS Consultation Hub", with the ABS receiving 450 submissions, 315 of which were published with consent.

== Collection ==
Since 2006, the ABS has allowed the census to be completed online, moving in 2016 to be digital-first. Like 2016, the 2021 Census was primarily collected online, with paper census forms being available on request for any household. In 2016, around a third of all households requested and completed their census using the paper form.

== Population and dwellings ==
The population counts for Australian states and territories were that New South Wales remains the most populous state, with 8,072,163 people counted, ahead of Victoria (6,503,491) and Queensland (5,156,138). The total population of Australian as counted in the 2021 census by state and external territories are:

States and territories		Male	Female	Total	% change
Flag of New South Wales	New South Wales	3,984,166	4,087,995	8,072,163	▲7.9%
Flag of Victoria (state)	Victoria	3,200,963	3,302,528	6,503,491	▲9.7%
Flag of Queensland	Queensland	2,540,404	2,615,736	5,156,138	▲9.6%
Flag of Western Australia	Western Australia	1,322,855	1,337,171	2,660,026	▲7.5%
Flag of South Australia	South Australia	878,592	902,924	1,781,516	▲6.3%
Flag of Tasmania	Tasmania	273,765	283,804	557,571	▲9.3%
Flag of Australian Capital Territory	Australian Capital Territory	224,361	230,140	454,499	▲14.4%
Flag of Northern Territory	Northern Territory	117,526	115,075	232,605	▲9.7%
Flag of Jervis Bay Territory	Jervis Bay Territory	149	158	310	▼20.7%
External Territories					
Flag of Christmas Island	Christmas Island	1,006	685	1,692	▼8.2%
Flag of Norfolk Island	Norfolk Island	1,060	1,130	2,188	▲25.2%
Flag of the Cocos (Keeling) Islands	Cocos (Keeling) Islands	302	292	593	▲9.0%
Australia		12,545,154	12,877,635	25,422,788	▲8.7%

== Country of birth ==
Country of birth of Australian residents at 2021 census

Of all residents over two-thirds (72.4% or 18,235,690) were born in Australia. Over a quarter of the population (27.6% or 7,502,450 persons) said they were born overseas. After Australia, England is the most common birthplace with 927,490 people. (Note: The Australian Bureau of Statistics source lists England, Scotland, Wales and Northern Ireland separately although they are all part of the United Kingdom. These should not be combined as they are not combined in the source.) India became the third-largest country of birth, surpassing China and New Zealand.

== Language ==
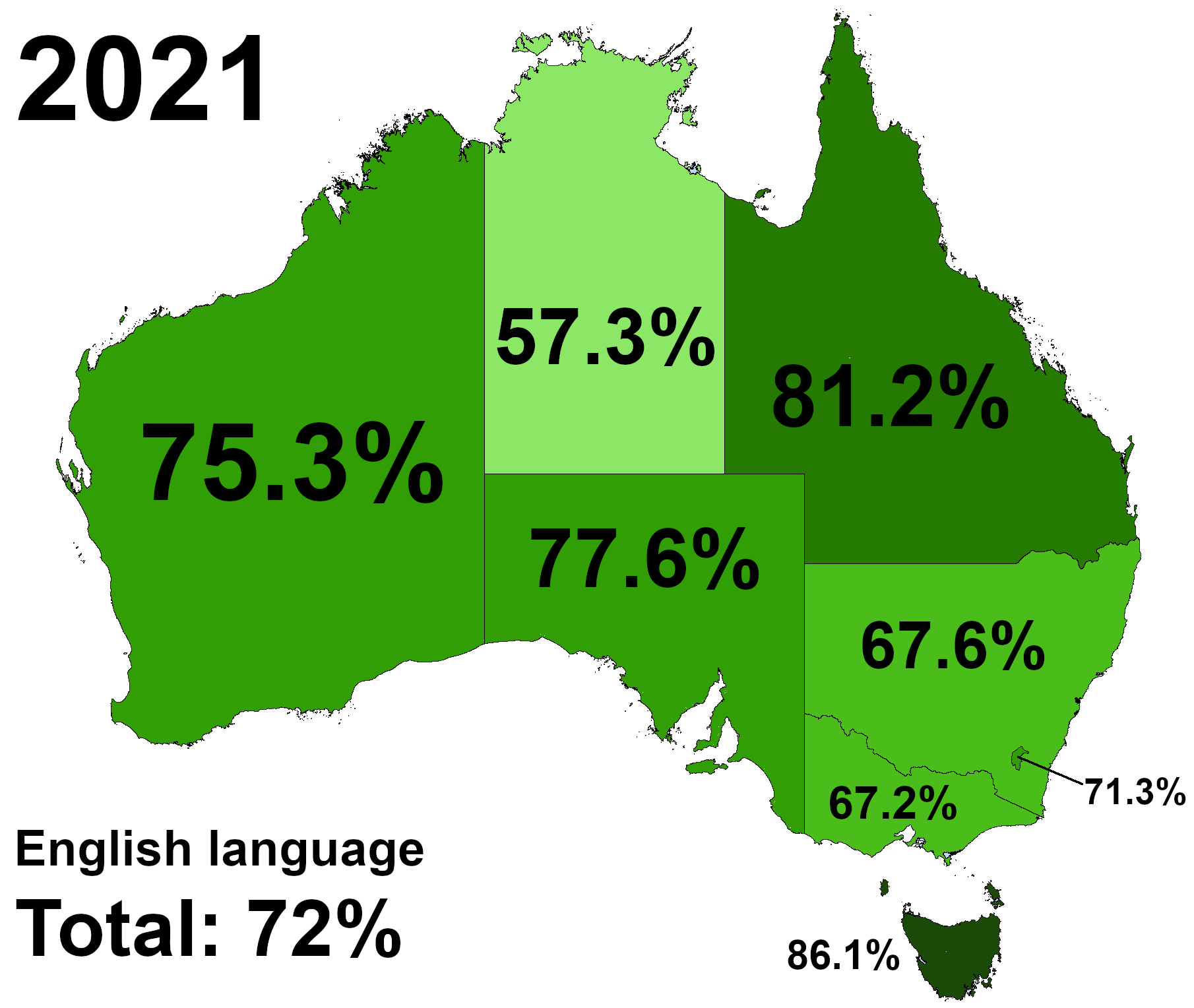
Population who speaks only English at home in 2021

- 72.0% spoke only English at home.
- 24.8% spoke a language other than English at home. The most common of these were:
  - Mandarin
  - Arabic
  - Vietnamese
  - Cantonese
  - Punjabi
- 2% of the population could not speak English at all.

== See also ==
- 2021 in Australia
- 1966 Australian census
