= Roy Cameron (statistician) =

Australian statistician

Roy Cameron CB
- Born: Roy James Cameron; 11 March 1923; Port Pirie, South Australia
- Died: 3 October 2006 (aged 83)
- Education: University of Adelaide (BEc (Hons), MEc); Harvard University (PhD)
- Occupations: Public servant, diplomat

Roy James Cameron CB (11 March 1923 – 3 October 2006) was an Australian public servant and diplomat. He was the Australian Statistician from 1977 to 1985.

== Life and career ==
Cameron was born in Port Pirie, South Australia on 11 March 1923. He studied at the University of Adelaide, graduating with first class honours from a Bachelor of Economics course in 1948. He graduated a Master of Economics from the university in 1951, with the topic "Standard hours and the basic wage: an analysis of two aspects of the work of the Commonwealth Court of Conciliation and Arbitration." He was awarded a Fulbright scholarship to study for his doctorate at Harvard University, starting in 1951. He completed his PhD in 1956.

From 1973 to 1977 Cameron was Australia's Ambassador to the Organisation for Economic Co-operation and Development in Paris. His appointment announcement, which was issued by Gough Whitlam in 1973, noted Cameron's broad experience in economic and financial matters.

In 1977 Cameron returned to Australia to take up his appointment as Australian Statistician. He served in the role until his retirement in August 1985.

Cameron died on 3 October 2006.

== Awards ==
Cameron was made a Companion of the Order of the Bath in the 1982 Birthday Honours.

Diplomatic posts
Preceded by Edward Ronald Walker	Australian Ambassador to the OECD; 1973–1977	Succeeded by Francis Patrick Donovan
Government offices
Preceded by William Cole	Australian Statistician; 1977–1985	Succeeded by Ian Castles
