= Permanent Representative of Australia to the Organisation for Economic Co-operation and Development =

Ambassador and Permanent Representative of Australia to the Organisation for Economic Co-operation and Development

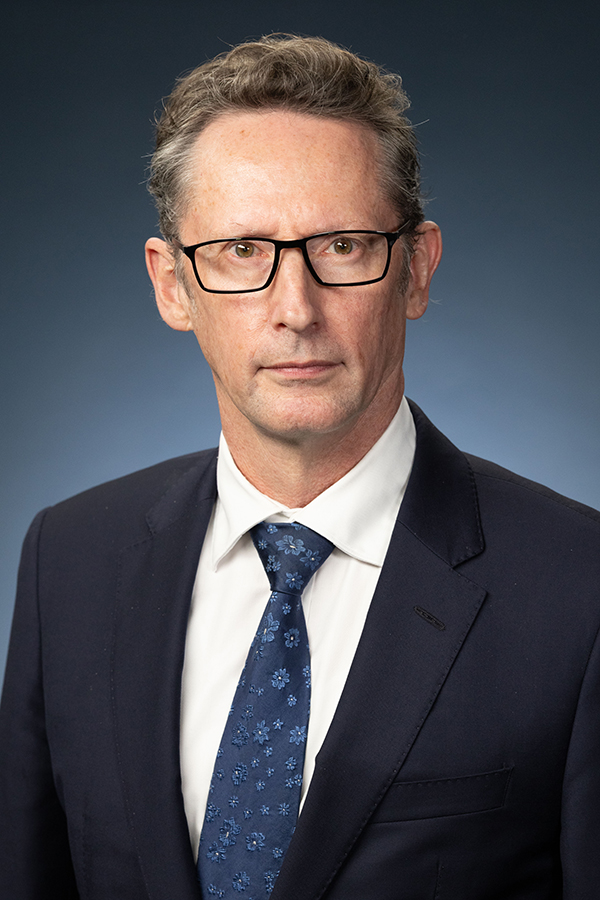
- Incumbent; Stephen Jones since 6 July 2025
- Department of Foreign Affairs and Trade
- Style: His Excellency
- Reports to: Minister for Foreign Affairs
- Seat: Embassy of Australia, Paris
- Nominator: Prime Minister of Australia
- Appointer: Governor General of Australia
- Inaugural holder: Sir Edward Ronald Walker
- Formation: 7 June 1971
- Website: Australian Embassy, France – OECD Delegation

The ambassador and permanent representative of Australia to the Organisation for Economic Co-operation and Development is an officer of the Australian Department of Foreign Affairs and Trade and the head of the delegation of the Commonwealth of Australia to the Organisation for Economic Co-operation and Development (OECD) in Paris, France. The position has the rank and status of an ambassador extraordinary and plenipotentiary and has been sent since Australia, represented by Deputy Prime Minister Doug Anthony and Ambassador to France Alan Renouf, acceded to the OECD on 7 June 1971. The delegation to the OECD is based with the Australian Embassy in Paris and the ambassador has resided in the embassy since its opening in 1978.

== List of permanent representatives ==
#	Officeholder	Term start date	Term end date	Time in office	Notes
1	Sir Edward Ronald Walker	7 June 1971	August 1973	2 years, 1 month	
2	Dr Roy Cameron	August 1973	1977	3–4 years	
3	Francis Patrick Donovan	1977	1980	2–3 years	
4	James Humphreys	1980	May 1983	2–3 years	
5	Fred Argy	28 May 1983	1985	1–2 years	
6	Alex McGoldrick	1985	1988	2–3 years	
7	Ed Visbord	1988	March 1991	2–3 years	
8	David Borthwick	March 1991	1993	1–2 years	
9	Trevor Boucher	1993	1995	1–2 years	
10	Ralph Hillman	April 1995	June 1998	3 years, 2 months	
11	Tony Hinton	June 1998	2001	2–3 years	
12	Ian Forsyth	September 2001	January 2005	3 years, 4 months	
13	Veronique Ingram	January 2005	January 2008	3 years	
14	Chris Langman	January 2008	July 2011	3 years, 6 months	
15	Chris Barrett	July 2011	1 April 2015	3 years, 9 months	
16	Brian Pontifex	1 April 2015	22 March 2019	3 years, 355 days	
17	Alexander Robson	22 March 2019	17 September 2021	2 years, 179 days	
18	Brendan Pearson	17 September 2021	11 September 2025	3 years, 359 days	
18	Stephen Jones	11 September 2025	Incumbent	361 days	
