= Richard Charles Mills =

Australian economist (1886–1952)

Richard Mills OBE
- Born: Richard Charles Mills; 8 March 1886; Ardmona, Victoria
- Died: 6 June 1952 (aged 66)
- Education: University High School, Melbourne
- Spouse: Helen Elizabeth Crawford
- Military career
- Allegiance: United Kingdom
- Branch: United Kingdom
- Service years: December 1915 – April 1918
- Rank: Captain (acting)
- Unit: 61st Siege Battery, Royal Garrison Artillery
- Scientific career
- Education: University of Melbourne; London School of Economics and Political Science
- Fields: Economics
- Workplaces: Queen's College, Melbourne; University of Sydney
- Thesis: The Colonization of Australia 1829–42 (1915)

Richard Charles Mills OBE (8 March 1886 – 6 August 1952) was an Australian economist and academic. He was head of the Faculty of Economics at the University of Sydney for 23 years, and a key member of several Australian government instrumentalities.

== Early years and background ==
Mills was born in Ardmona, Victoria near Shepparton or Mooroopna to schoolteacher Samuel Mills (c. 1860 – 8 June 1931) and his wife Sarah Mills, née Bray (died 20 October 1935), later of Heyfield, Victoria, where Samuel was head teacher for 25 years, then Coppin Street, East Malvern.

He was educated at Melbourne's University High School, Melbourne and the University of Melbourne, where he studied law, history and political economy, gaining his Bachelor of Laws in 1909 and Masters in 1910. Mills was, in 1907, the first president of the Students' Representative Council, Melbourne University.

In 1912 he entered the London School of Economics and Political Science, and graduated with a D.Sc. in 1915. His thesis, on the Wakefield scheme for developing South Australia, was later published as The Colonization of Australia 1829–42.

== Career ==
=== Military ===
He enlisted with the British Army in December 1915, and after officer training served in France and Belgium with the 61st Siege Battery, Royal Garrison Artillery, and suffered from a gas attack at Armentières in April 1918, when he was mentioned in dispatches.

=== Academia ===
After the war he returned to Melbourne, and for a few years tutored in history at Queen's College. In 1921 Mills lectured in economics and commerce at the University of Sydney, then in 1922 was appointed Professor of Economics and head of the faculty. He appointed Frederic Benham as a lecturer. Under his deanship the University of Sydney could claim to have the leading economics school in Australia.

In 1930 he was awarded a Carnegie visiting professorship and spent several years with his family in America. In 1932 he was appointed to a committee to tasked with prepare a preliminary survey of Australia's Depression-induced economic problems and in the same year appointed by the New South Wales Government as consultant to the NSW Treasury and adviser to Premier Bertram Stevens. Along with Ben Chifley and others, he was a member of the 1935 royal commission into the banking system, the recommendations of which were mostly implemented. He gained the friendship and trust of Chifley, and was increasingly drawn into public service. Mills resigned from the university in 1945 to become full-time chairman of the Universities Commission and director of the new Commonwealth Office of Education. In 1949 he persuaded Chifley of the value of financial assistance to university students, which ushered in the Commonwealth scholarships scheme.

Mills served as a professor of economics at the University of Sydney from 1922 to 1945. He was the chairman of the professorial board of the University of Sydney from 1934 to 1941; and was a member of the University of Sydney Senate in from 1934 to 1946.

=== Government and other roles ===
He was instrumental in the negotiations that resulted in reformed Commonwealth taxes and simultaneously abolished state income taxes, replacing them with grants from the Commonwealth Grants Commission. In 1950 he was chairman of the committee on financing of universities which recommended a grants system, which resulted in expanded teaching and research capabilities and higher academic standards, an achievement of which Prime Minister Robert Menzies proudly pointed to as an achievement of his government.

As director of the newly formed Commonwealth Office of Education, Mills was responsible also for schools in the ACT and the Northern Territory, the Australian involvement with UNESCO, and other forms of overseas educational aid.

Mills served as a commissioner for the Victorian royal commission on high prices in 1919; on the economic commission on the Queensland basic wage in 1925; he was a member of the 1939 Royal Commission into the banking industry. Other members were Judge John M. Napier, Edwin V. Nixon, C.M.G., Joseph B. Chifley, Henry A. Pitt, C.M.G., and Joseph P. Abbott. Mills served as the Chairman of the Commonwealth Grants Commission from 1941 to 1945, succeeding Sir Frederic William Eggleston; and Chairman of the Commonwealth Committee on Uniform Taxation in 1942. Mills was appointed chairman of the Universities Commission and director of the new Commonwealth Office of Education in 1945 and was chairman of the Interim Council of the Australian National University between 1946 and 1951; when the first University Council was formed. Mills was appointed a member of its Governing Council in 1947.

Mills was a member of the NSW Branch of the League of Nations Union, serving on academic committees to improve public opinion about the League.

In 1924 he help to found the Economic Society of Australia and New Zealand.

Mills was appointed an Officer of the Order of the British Empire in 1936. In 1957, the first R.C. Mills memorial lecture was held in his honour. In 1949, the University of Sydney named the first permanent building for the Faculty of Economics 'The R.C. Mills Building' in 1949. It remains to this day; and the Australian National University has named a boardroom in the Chancelry Building in Mills' honour.

== Other interests ==
Mills was a keen sportsman; he excelled at Australian Rules football, tennis and cricket, and played the latter two well into middle age. He was a vice-president of the University of Sydney Athletics Club in 1928.

Mills enjoyed poetry, the theatre and reading. He was the author of several anonymously published short stories, and was an expert bridge player. In the 1930s The Sunday Sun published a humorous column, Diary of a Doctor who was Told, a spoof on Diary of a Doctor who Tells, also in The Sunday Sun.

== Family and later life ==
Mills married Irishwoman Helen Elizabeth Crawford at Ballymena, Ireland on 14 October 1916. They had two sons and two daughters, and lived most of their lives in the Sydney suburb of Mosman.

Mills, who suffered from chronic nephritis and arteriosclerosis, died in a hospital on 6 August 1952 and was cremated.

== Selected publications ==
- Mills, R. C.; Benham, Frederic C. (1925) Principles of Money, Banking and Foreign Exchange Applied to Australia. Workers' Educational Association, Sydney.
- He wrote the introduction to the Everyman edition of Wakefield's A Letter from Sydney (London, 1929).
- He wrote the entry on William Hearn for the Encyclopedia of the Social Sciences (New York, 1932).
- He contributed many articles to the Economic Record, journal of the Economic Society of Australia and New Zealand.
- Mills, R. C.; Sir Walker, Ronald. Money (1935), underwent 13 editions.

Academic offices
New title	Chair of the Interim Council of the Australian National University; 1946 – 1951	Succeeded by 1st Viscount Bruce of Melbourne as Chancellor
