= Buildings of St Joseph's College, Nudgee =

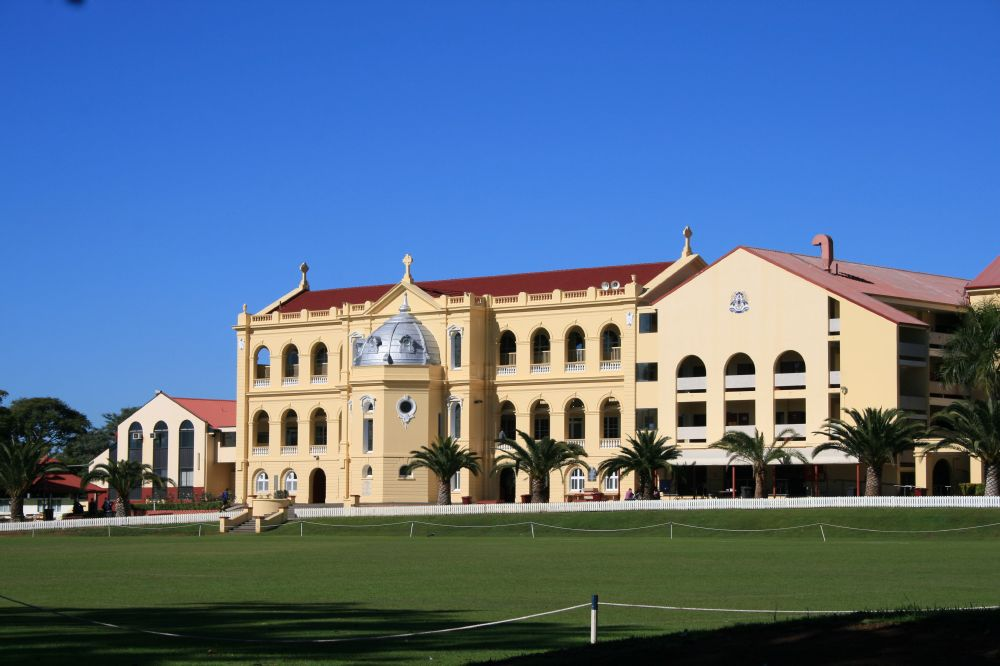
- Main Building, 2009

- Location within Queensland
- 27.3577°S 153.0625°E
- Location: 2199 Sandgate Road, Boondall, City of Brisbane, Queensland, Australia

History
- Design period: 1870s–1890s (late 19th century)
- Built: 1891–c. 1960

Queensland Heritage Register
- Official name: St Joseph's Nudgee College, Nudgee College
- Type: state heritage (landscape, built)
- Designated: 6 November 2006
- Reference no.: 601771
- Significant period: 1890s–c. 1960 (fabric); 1890s– (historical, social)
- Significant components: lawn/s, grandstand, service wing, fence/wall - perimeter, tower – observation/lookout, tower – stair, chapel, dormitory, verandahs – arcaded, furniture/fittings, statue, trees/plantings, garden/grounds, wall/s – retaining, gate – entrance, carriage way/drive, dome, clock, sports field/oval/playing field, classroom/classroom block/teaching area, courtyard, memorial – honour board/ roll of honour, memorial – plaque

The Buildings of St Joseph's College, Nudgee is a heritage-listed group of school buildings at St Joseph's College, Nudgee at 2199 Sandgate Road, Boondall, City of Brisbane, Queensland, Australia. They were built from 1891 to c. 1960. The school is also known as Nudgee College and St Joseph's Nudgee College. The buildings added to the Queensland Heritage Register on 6 November 2006.

== History ==
St. Joseph's Nudgee College was established in 1891 to serve the needs of rural Roman Catholic boys. It was the first purpose-built boarding college erected in Queensland for the Christian Brothers, who were the first Catholic order to provide secondary education for boys in Queensland, decades before the Marists or other orders. Offering affordable Catholic education through to senior and university entrance, St Joseph's Nudgee College has been important in fostering Catholic upward mobility (social, cultural, economic and political) in Queensland. During the 20th century St Joseph's Nudgee College developed into a large educational complex. Most of the major structures were designed by prominent Queensland architects and illustrate the evolution of Catholic educational architecture in Queensland. The college remains a boys-only school and the property of the Christian Brothers.

The former Main Building, containing the oldest structures on the site, remains the core of the college. From here radiate 20th century developments constructed in response to school growth. The college has rarely had the luxury of building in anticipation of growth; a policy of keeping fees affordable has meant that funds for extensions have seldom been easy to raise.

Although Roman Catholics comprised approximately 23.5% of the Queensland population in 1891 when St Joseph's College at Nudgee was opened, Queensland Government policy disadvantaged Catholic schools. The Grammar Schools Act of 1860 provided government support to Grammar Schools, but not to denominational schools. Although the Education Act of 1860, which established a system of primary schools in Queensland, provided some assistance to non-vested schools, The Education Act (1875) halted government aid to denominational primary schools. Committed to providing access to a Catholic education for all Roman Catholic children in Queensland, the Catholic Church responded by accelerating the development of a network of parochial schools from the mid-1870s.

The Christian Brothers, a teaching order founded in Ireland by Edmund Ignatius Rice in the early 19th century, were invited to Queensland by Bishop of Brisbane James O'Quinn to assist in the development of Catholic secondary education in Queensland. The Order had established a permanent presence in Australia when Brothers Patrick Ambrose Treacy, John Barnabas Lynch and Dominic Fursey Bodkin immigrated to Melbourne in 1868. When Bishop O'Quinn's wrote of the urgent need for a teaching order of men in Queensland, Brother Patrick Ambrose Treacy, considered the founder of the Christian Brothers in Australia, responded by establishing a Christian Brothers school in Brisbane in 1875. The Brothers chose land on Gregory Terrace as the site for their school but while awaiting its construction, commenced teaching in 1875 at St Stephen's Catholic Church in Elizabeth Street. The school relocated to Gregory Terrace in 1880.

St Joseph's College on Gregory Terrace functioned initially as a day school, but Bishop O'Quinn successfully pressured the Brothers to admit boarders to Gregory Terrace. Archbishop Robert Dunne, who succeeded O'Quinn in 1881, continued to press the Brothers to increase accommodation for boarders. The establishment of Catholic boarding schools was not traditional in Ireland, where boarding schools were seen as the province of the elite. In Queensland, O'Quinn and Dunne promoted boarding schools as a solution to the vastness of Queensland which had a small population scattered over huge areas far distant from principal urban centres. Boarding schools were a logical choice for rural Catholic boys but southern boarding schools (as in Sydney) were expensive and O'Quinn and Dunne wanted to reach the poorer rural Catholics who comprised the bulk of the Catholic congregation. It was essential that Catholic boarding schools with moderate fees be established in Queensland.

Despite the construction of a new dormitory wing at the Gregory Terrace school in 1888, accommodation proved inadequate for the increasing number of boarders. In response, Brother Treacy decided to establish a second school specifically to accommodate St Joseph's boarders, on land at Nudgee owned by the Order. The site comprised 258 acres (104 ha) situated between Nundah Creek and Cabbage Tree Creek, about 9 miles (14 km) from the Brisbane central business district, accessed via Sandgate Road and the Sandgate railway line. In addition to this, Treacy purchased 50 acres (20 ha) of adjacent land from Reverend Holme, a Presbyterian minister, obtaining title in May 1890. This included the "Nudgee Mound", which became the site of the Main Building at St Joseph's College. In the late 1880s Nudgee was a rural district, convenient to the city but sufficiently isolated and removed from the distractions of town. Proximity to the city had been one of the perceived problems with Gregory Terrace.

=== Main Building (1890) ===
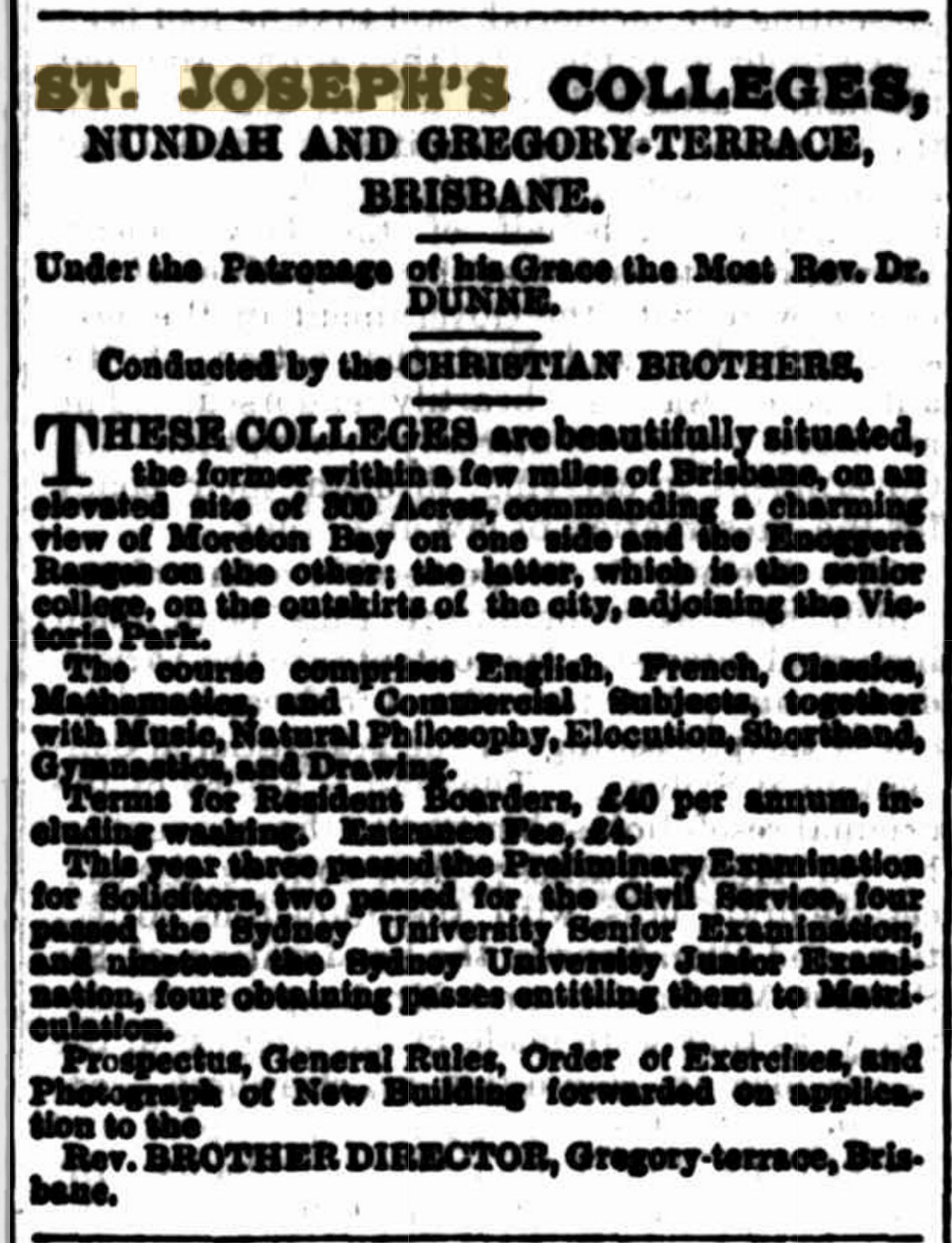
Advertisement for St Joseph's College at Nudgee and Gregory Terrace, 1891

The oldest structure in the school is the southern half of the Main Building facing Sandgate Road. Construction commenced in 1890 and the first pupils occupied the building in February 1891.

Stombuco and Son were engaged as architects. Andrea Stombuco was a flamboyant Italian sculptor, monumental mason, builder and architect who had travelled extensively as a youth before settling in the Cape Colony, where he owned and operated a stone quarry. He joined briefly in the Victorian gold rush in 1851 before practising as a sculptor, contractor and architect in Victoria. The Catholic Church became his principal patron. In 1869 he was appointed Diocesan Architect for Goulburn in New South Wales, then in 1875 moved to Queensland, possibly at the invitation of Bishop O'Quinn. His commissions for the Catholic Church in Queensland included St Joseph's Christian Brothers College on Gregory Terrace, Spring Hill (1875–1876 with additions by Stombuco and Son in 1886–1887); St Mary's Roman Catholic Presbytery, Ipswich (1876); a church at Laidley (1878); a church at Pine Mountain (1878); St Francis Xavier Church at Goodna (1880–1881); a church at Sandgate (1880–1881); All Hallows' Convent School, Petrie Bight (1880–1882); St Patrick's Church, Fortitude Valley (1880–1882); and St Vincent's Convent and Church, Nudgee (1883–1884). In 1886, he entered into partnership with his eldest son, Giovanni. Churches at Wooloowin (1886) and Kangaroo Point (1887–1888) and a number of prominent private residences were among the buildings designed by the father and son partnership. St Joseph's College, Nudgee (1889–1890) was amongst the last of their work in Brisbane. In 1891, experiencing financial difficulty, Andrea Stombuco moved to Perth, where he died in poverty in 1907. His family remained in Queensland. On Andrea's departure for Western Australia, his son Giovanni Stombuco took up farming at Kuraby, South of Brisbane.

Of the building designed by Stombuco and Son, only part was initially constructed: the tower and a section of the South Wing. The ground floor contained a classroom and the upper two floors held a chapel and dormitories. A temporary galvanised iron building containing four classrooms was erected close to the Main Building, but was removed in 1904. The front grounds appear to have been laid out early in the history of the college. By 1897, and probably much earlier, the heart-shaped lawn with its surrounding carriage way and statue of St Joseph had been established, ornamental trees had been planted and a picket fence had been erected along the Sandgate Road boundary in front of the Main Building.

The school accepted its first pupils – 41 junior school boarders relocated from Gregory Terrace – in February 1891. The first principal was Brother Dominic Fursey Bodkin who had come to Australia with Brother Treacy in 1868. Archbishop Dunne was overseas at the time, but after his return he officially opened the college on 8 May 1891. By this time £12,776 had been spent on constructing and setting up the school.

=== Dormitory Block (1900) ===
In 1892 the remaining Gregory Terrace boarders were moved to Nudgee. Enrolments grew rapidly and between 1895 and 1900 the school population almost doubled. To accommodate increasing enrolments a two-storeyed building was constructed behind the Main Building in 1900. This was aligned east–west behind the South Wing of the Main Building and was eventually joined to the South Wing in 1937. The new building provided dormitory accommodation, which then enabled an upper dormitory in the South Wing to be converted into a chapel.

By 1903 the principal declared that Nudgee was "the largest boarding institution of its kind in the Commonwealth", evidence of a sizeable Catholic rural population that set Queensland apart from other Australian states.

=== Main Building (1904) ===
The northern half of the Main Building, including a section of the North Wing, was finished in 1904. This completed Stombuco and Son's design and the symmetry of the Main Building around the central tower. An arcade across the front of the building, which faced west into the strong afternoon sun, was added to the initial design and the tower was heightened and topped with a dome. The architect for this work was James Percy Cowlishaw (1867–1925), son of one of Brisbane's earliest private architects, James Cowlishaw. The ground floor contained senior classrooms and a students' hall, now known as Ryan Hall. The first floor held a library and both the first and second floors contained dormitories with bathrooms. This wing was opened officially by Queensland Governor Sir Herbert Chermside on 24 June 1904.

In the early 20th century St Joseph's College continued to grow and by 1913 enrolments had reached 209. Overcrowding made further extensions a necessity but the college remained heavily in debt. In 1911, the Golden Jubilee celebration for Brother Barrett, a longstanding Christian Brother who had taught for many years at both Gregory Terrace and Nudgee, was made the occasion for the beginning of a fundraising campaign. An appeal was made to the Queensland Catholic community and funds raised by this campaign made it possible to commence work on further extensions including the present chapel, new servants' quarters, laundry, kitchen, storerooms and infirmary, as well as the fitting up of science rooms. The new buildings, with the exception of the chapel, were probably located immediately to the south of the Main Building.

=== Chapel (1914–1916) ===
Archbishop James Duhig of Brisbane laid the foundation stone for a new chapel on 5 October 1913 as part of the fund raising campaign. Construction commenced late in 1914 and the building was dedicated by Duhig on 25 March 1916.

Prominent Catholic architect Thomas Ramsay Hall (later one of the designers of Brisbane City Hall in 1919) was commissioned to design the new chapel. Hall was a Queensland-trained architect, a cadet in the Queensland Public Works Department before joining the architectural firm of FR Hall and RS Dods c. 1904 and then establishing his own practice in 1907. Hall was one of Brisbane's most successful architects of the early 20th century. His collaborations with GG Prentice as Hall and Prentice (1919–1929) and with LB Phillips as Hall and Phillips (from 1929 to 1948) produced some of Queensland's most important commercial buildings of the first half of the 20th century. His early work included Sandgate Town Hall (1911) and numerous public works designs.

Hall designed the new chapel at St Joseph's College in the Renaissance revival style, to harmonise with the Main Building. Internally he created a light and airy space, with white walls and light stained woodwork. The sanctuary was flanked by Ionic columns of dark red marble and the altar was of grey marble.

=== Additions (1917–1919) ===
With the death of Archbishop Dunne in 1917, St Joseph's College received an unexpected windfall. Dunne bequeathed £30,000 of Church funds to the Brothers, of which £15,000 was allocated to Nudgee. This financed further building, again made necessary by overcrowding: 285 boys were enrolled in 1917 and even the library was being used as a dormitory. The block constructed in 1900 was extended to include 12 music rooms, teachers' rooms, a dentist's room, a men's dining room, and a new toilet block. The Dunne Memorial Block (later the Duhig Building) was a substantial two-storeyed structure containing 8 classrooms. Located close to the North Wing of the Main Building, it remained detached until 1975. TR Hall was again engaged as architect. The block was completed in 1919 but no public opening was held due to an influenza epidemic.

"Big Ben" is the name applied to a college icon, a large freestanding clock of English manufacture located in a lawn to the east of the Quadrangle. It was reputedly obtained by the Queensland Government in 1895 and exhibited in Brisbane at the Queensland International Exhibition of 1897. Heindorff and Company of Queen Street then purchased the clock, which stood on the Queen Street footpath until the college acquired it in 1917.

=== Front wall (1930) ===
In 1930 a substantial front wall with imposing entrance gates was constructed, funded by Brisbane Catholic businessman TC Beirne.

=== Extensions to the South Wing (1937) ===
In 1937 the Main Building was linked to the dormitory block constructed in 1900, by three-storeyed extensions to the South Wing. The extension was principally a service block, providing two new locker rooms, new bathroom and lavatory accommodation and on the ground floor, serveries and an extension to the kitchen.

=== Extensions (late 1950s) ===
By the late 1950s, overcrowding yet again led to a renewed building program. Contributing to the overcrowding was the increased numbers of boys who were returning after Junior - a reflection of changed social expectations and economic circumstances. Expansion in the senior school was accommodated by further extensions to the Main Building. Two dormitories with shower blocks and new Brothers' rooms were constructed over pre-existing refectory extensions. In addition to these extensions, three new classrooms to the rear of the tennis courts were constructed.

The architect for this work was Frank Cullen, a nephew of Archbishop Duhig, who had commenced his career in 1928 as an articled pupil of Hennessy, Hennessy and Co, Brisbane. He established his own practice in 1936. Cullen undertook many works for the Catholic Church in Queensland.

=== New Senior Secondary School (1965–67) ===
The largest and most significant structure away from the Main Building is the Senior Secondary School, erected in the mid-1960s. Its construction reflected a statewide rise in secondary school attendance combined with educational reform. In the 1950s Queensland had experienced a rapid growth in secondary student numbers, the outcome of the post-war "baby boom" and increased immigration (including significant numbers of Catholics) combined with national economic growth. These changes together with the educational reforms brought about by the Committee of Inquiry on Secondary Education in 1961, led to increased numbers in the Senior School at St Joseph's Nudgee College and pressures on the senior curriculum. Improved funding for Catholic Schools from the Federal Government aided the expansion necessary to accommodate these changes.

As early as 1959 it was clear that better senior facilities would be needed. Plans for a self-contained complex for the senior school were completed in 1964. It was the largest single building project since construction of the Main Building in 1890 and was estimated to cost £1,000,000. Construction commenced in August 1965. The complex was opened and blessed on 21 May 1967 and the accommodation section was occupied in July 1967.

The original building included the Senior Residence and School but not the Year Eleven Residence. Designed to provide for all senior school requirements, it included accommodation, laundries, classrooms, science laboratories and refreshment facilities. Professor Neville Anderson of the School of Architecture of the University of New South Wales was asked to consult on the project. He had worked for the Christian Brothers at Waverley College in Sydney and spent several days at the school developing the brief. Designing architects were Cullen, Fagg, Hargraves and Mooney, a practice that had carried out many commissions for the Catholic Church. The new Senior School, although similar in scale to the older buildings, was the first major building in the college grounds to depart from the Italianate architectural style adopted by Stombuco and Son in the late 1880s.

=== Extensions and alterations (mid-1970s) ===
During a mid-1970s building program the Dunne Memorial Block was joined to the North Wing by the construction of the Junior Sciences Block (now the Gallagher Building) in 1975. The original wooden verandahs on the northern facade of the 1900 South Wing were replaced in concrete and the South Wing was extended east to provide a new infirmary. Construction was plagued by industrial unrest and the main contractor went into liquidation.

=== Extensions (mid-1980s) ===
The Main Building reached its current form during a development program that commenced in the mid-1980s. At the beginning of the 1980s, the ever-increasing size of the school and the perennial problem of inadequate funding led to the remodelling of the administration of the school. A business manager was appointed and an advisory board established. In 1984, Civil & Civic commenced work on a Campus Development Strategy and a Foundation was established to raise funds for the proposed developments.

Work began on implementing this strategy in 1985. The Quadrangle was refurbished and the following year an administration block was erected to the east of the Dunne Memorial Block. A Manual Arts Block was built in 1987 south of the South Wing. During the summer vacation of 1988–89 the Dunne Memorial Block was converted from two storeys to its present three storeys. The interior was gutted, but the form of the building and the principal facades were retained. A year eleven dormitory designed by Queensland architect Ian Ferrier was added to the Senior School during 1986.

=== Ancillary Buildings ===
Most of the ancillary buildings at the college post-date 1975. A range of smaller buildings such as the laundry, storerooms, boiler house and servants quarters were constructed, probably to the south of the Main Building, in the early days of the college. These have been removed or absorbed into the South Wing extensions. The largest and most significant ancillary buildings presently occupying the site include the Library, Tierney Hall, the McKennariey Centre, the Parents and Friends Multipurpose Hall and the Junior Residence.

Tierney Hall was constructed in 1975 in response to the need for a gymnasium and large hall in which to hold school functions. The architect for this work was William Douglas and the engineer was John Cavanagh.

The Library, named after Monsignor Vincent Cleary, was also built at this time. Monsignor Cleary was an old boy of the college and foundation director of nearby Pius XII Seminary. He died on 8 August 1975, a few days after the library designed by Ian Ferrier was opened.

The McKennariey Centre, opened in 1990, contained a range of indoor sporting facilities, health and physical education classrooms, a manager's office and a canteen. The centre was named after Brother Leonard Bede McKennariey, son of the college's first pupil and a Christian Brother who had spent many years teaching at Nudgee.

The Parents and Friends Multipurpose Hall and the Junior Residence designed by architect Laurie Bertoldi, were opened in February 1995 by Archbishop John Bathersby.

=== Sporting Facilities ===
Sport has been a significant focus in St Joseph's curriculum from its establishment. The college prospectus for 1890 made reference to play- grounds and a gymnasium and by 1896 the main sports field contained about ten acres, with football facilities and cricket pitch. One of the original sports areas was located in the northwest corner of the grounds, north of the Main Building and adjacent to the 1914–16 chapel, in the area now occupied by Ross Oval. A second playing area, down on the flat, was in use by 1927, although it was some distance from the main buildings and flooded during the rainy season.

In 1927 the Main Oval near the chapel was levelled, a grandstand was erected and the concrete wicket was replaced by two turf pitches. The name of the oval was changed from Main Oval to Ross Oval in 1978 at the request of the Old Boys Association. John (Jack) Ross (1894–1973) was a prominent and much loved sportsman who had attended Nudgee as a student from 1908 to 1912 and had then taught at the college from 1914 almost to his death.

The college's second oval, Wilkes Oval, located to the east of Ross Oval, was developed between 1934 and 1935 under the Queensland Government's Unemployment Relief Scheme implemented during the 1930s' economic depression, to provide day work for the long-term unemployed.

A swimming pool was also constructed under this scheme. For many years Nudgee Creek had served as the college swimming facility, with a corrugated iron shed and diving platform erected there. In 1935 a 25-metre (82 ft) swimming pool was built in the grounds, close to the southeast corner of Wilkes Oval. The pool remained in use until 1981 when deterioration forced its closure. The present 50-metre (160 ft) McKennariey pool was opened in 1982.

The school's first tennis courts were built in 1907, on the site of the present Edmund Rice Mall. They were dismantled in 1918 and four new courts were erected in 1922 some distance behind the South Wing, in the location of what is now a car park. These were removed in 1991 when the present courts were built.

== Description ==
=== Setting ===
Clustered on the highest part of a sprawling 148 hectares (370 acres) site, St Joseph's Nudgee College is a complex of educational and associated residential buildings constructed from the 1890s to the present. The extensive grounds are located in what is now the suburb of Boondall, a residential area fringed with light industrial and commercial development. The grounds contain, in addition to the school buildings, extensive areas of native wetlands, agricultural plots, pastures, playing fields and other sporting facilities. Despite the intensive development that has taken place around the school since it was first established, parts of the site retain the qualities of the earlier rural setting.

The school buildings are concentrated in the most elevated part of the site, an area bounded by Sandgate Road on the west and Northumbria Road to the north. In the most prominent position on the site, adjacent to the intersection, is a sporting field, Ross Oval. Mature trees, including a double row of camphor laurels along Sandgate Road, line the road frontages and contribute to the school's established garden setting. Located to the south of Ross Oval are the earliest college buildings including the Main Building, the Chapel and the Dunne Building. Substantial masonry edifices in an imposing Italianate style, these buildings are prominent landmarks and the most visible part of the school from the surrounding streets. Initially building work was concentrated in this area but over time has spread to the south and east of the main group of buildings.

=== Main Building (Cotter and O'Brien Residences) ===
Facing west towards Sandgate Road, the Main Building is a large three- storey rendered masonry building linked by a colonnade to the adjoining Chapel. Through its size, prominent position and imposing Renaissance Revival style architecture the Main Building dominates the built landscape of the school.

The formal entrance to the school, the TC Beirne Memorial Gate, is located directly in front of the Main Building. Consisting of stone pillars surmounted by crosses and fitted with wrought iron gates, it leads to a circular drive that divides the lawn in front of the Main Building. The fence adjoining the TC Beirne Memorial Gate has a stone base and wrought iron panels above. A stone statue of St Joseph is positioned in the lawn in front of the entrance to the Main Building.

Originally designed as a symmetrical building, U-shaped in plan and arranged around an east-facing courtyard, the Main Building was built in stages and has had several additions to the original design including the two-storey colonnade on the western front and a substantial L-shaped extension on the south side of the original building. The Main Building has a painted hipped corrugated iron roof with masonry chimneys projecting through the roof. Timber joinery is used throughout the building with the majority of the windows being large double-hung windows.

==== Western Facade ====
The original front facade is divided into five bays with the walls and roof of the central and end bays projecting beyond the line of the adjoining structure. The most striking feature of the facade is the two-storey masonry arcade with round arches and pilasters. The arcade elaborates the Renaissance theme of the original design, connects the Main Building to the chapel and protects it from the western sun. The roof of the arcade forms a terrace to the upper level of the Main Building and the parapet, which acts as a balustrade to the roof terrace, incorporates classical balusters.

The front entrance and the stair tower are located on the principal axis of the building, in the centre of the original facade. The entrance is emphasised by the projection of the central bay of the arcade, the use of arched and triangular pediments and a gable roof on the upper storey. The tower is situated on the eastern or rear side of the building but an ornamental belvedere on top of the tower is visible from Sandgate Road, above the roofline. The belvedere is an open observatory roofed by a dome on a square base and supported by columns. It now houses a marble statue.

The northern facade of the Main Building faces onto a small courtyard that overlooks Ross Oval. The major features of the northern facade are regular rows of double hung timber windows with arched pediments and decorative plaster friezes between each level. The brick-paved courtyard is bounded by the chapel on the west and a modern classroom block on the east. The classroom block (Gallagher), which abuts the North Wing and a modern colonnade attached to the North Wing are not considered of cultural heritage significance.

==== Rear Elevations ====
The rear of the main building faces onto the eastern courtyard. Heavy three storey concrete verandahs, built to replace the narrower original timber verandahs, incorporate the original cast iron panels. The contrasting style and proportion of the concrete verandahs detracts from the original architecture and blocks light out of the stairwell.

A two-storey masonry block built in 1900, originally dormitories and now finance offices, adjoins the original southern wing and is connected to it by a two-storey concrete verandah. An extension at the eastern end of the 1900 block serves as the infirmary.

The 1960s' extension at the southern end of the Main Building is the same height and materials as the original building but has fewer decorative features. Arched ornament similar to that used on the original building is found over the windows on one bay of the western facade and one bay of the southern facade. The ground floor of the southern extension contains kitchen and dining facilities.

==== Interior ====
The floor of the front entry porch, under the arcade, is raised several steps above the surrounding level. From the entry porch, a pair of timber panelled doors with a decorative glass and timber surround open into an entry vestibule. The vestibule is tiled with multi-coloured tessellated tiles and decorative mouldings including cornice, picture rail and skirting. A set of timber-framed doors at the rear of the vestibule has side panels and a fanlight, all of which are glazed with decorative leadlight. These doors open onto a corridor that runs north–south through the building and a stairwell that leads to the upper floors. The corridor, which terminates at the entrance to the former senior classroom at the northern end and at the dining room in the southern extension, leads past a series of smaller rooms on either side of it, including former offices and parlours. In the stairwell opposite the vestibule is a grand marble and timber staircase, square in plan and wrapped around a central void.

The stairwell occupies the tower that terminates in the roof top belvedere. A primarily timber structure, the stair has ornamental balusters, carved stringers and marble treads and risers on the flights between ground and first floor. Painted cast iron panels are incorporated into the stair balustrade. Beyond the first floor the stair treads and risers are timber. A narrower stair connects the second floor to a room at the top of the tower under the belvedere.

The upper floor levels are similar in plan to the ground floor with rows of rooms accessed from a central corridor. Some larger rooms, such as a former library on the first floor level, occupy the full width of the building and open onto both the arcade on the western side and the eastern verandah. Interior walls are generally masonry with a plaster finish. Some ceilings in larger rooms are pressed metal. The first floor level of the arcade provides access to the choir loft of the chapel.

=== Chapel ===
The chapel, located adjacent to Ross Oval and abutting the northwest corner of the Main Building, is a rendered masonry structure, with a tiled gable roof. Positioned to the side and in front of the Main Building, the chapel is the closest, in the group of older buildings, to Sandgate Road. Designed in an Italianate style to complement the existing architecture, the chapel is connected by the two-storey arcade to the Main Building.

The chapel is basically rectangular in plan, with the long axis running east–west. Projecting beyond the main walls are three bays, clustered around the western end of the chapel. These bays consist of a single storey rectilinear bay on each side of the chapel and a taller semicircular apse on the Sandgate Road or western end. The domed apse, the main decorative feature of the Sandgate Road facade, has a zinc roof incorporating ornamental vents and rendered and banded walls decorated with festoons.

Although the Chapel consists principally of a single large double-height space, the facades are divided by the use of classical motifs into two levels. The ornament and detailing of the facades is based on the design of the arcade, which forms the east facade of the chapel. On the lower level of the north and south facades is a blind arcade of round arches supported on pilasters. The upper level contains a row of tall narrow round arched windows separated by pilasters with Corinthian capitals. The parapet above repeats the classical balusters used on the arcade. An ornate cupola supported by diminutive columns and surmounted with an elaborate metal cross is located in the centre of the ridge of the tiled roof.

The main entry to the chapel, in the centre of the east front, is from the ground level of the arcade. Displayed in the arcade are several memorial plaques including an ornate marble WW1 honour tablet with marble pilasters, modillions, arched top and brass nameplates and a brass WW2 honour board.

The entry vestibule is single storey space located under the choir mezzanine. Small rooms, one of which functions as a vestry, open off either side of the vestibule. An arch supported on paired red marble Ionic columns frames the opening from the entry vestibule into the main space of the chapel. A simple double-height space, the interior of the chapel is symmetrical with a central aisle leading between rows of timber pews, to the high altar.

The double-height walls and coffered ceiling are decorated with classical motifs in plaster relief and a multi-coloured paint scheme. Pilasters on the lower part of the wall have Ionic capitals while those on the upper part have Corinthian capitals. High leadlight windows, positioned between pilasters, light the space from above. The choir mezzanine, located at the eastern end overlooking the main space and accessed from the upper level of the arcade, is a curved cantilevered balcony with an ornate timber balustrade.

At the western end of the main space a chancel arch, similar to but grander than the entry arch, frames the high altar. The domed semi-circular niche which houses the marble high altar is painted various shades of blue. Single storey bays are attached to the sides of the main space adjacent to the western end. The northern bay contains a marble altar and opens onto the main space through two arches located between pilasters. The southern bay contains a room accessed via timber doors.

=== Former Dunne (Duhig) Building ===
The Former Dunne building, a rectangular masonry building with a tiled gable roof, consists of an undercroft with three storeys of classrooms above. Located to the east of, but in line with, the chapel, it faces Northumbria Road across Ross Oval. Continuing the architectural style established by the Main Building and the chapel, the Dunne Building has an arched arcade on either side of a projecting central bay and an attached semi-octagonal stair tower as the principal features of its main or northern facade.

The rendered masonry walls of the arcade are detailed with simple plaster mouldings. Classical balusters form the balustrade between the arches of the arcade. The base of the building is rendered in a banded pattern with arches opening to the undercroft. The bay in the centre of the symmetrical facade is ornamented with pilasters and narrow stained glass arched windows with decorative pediments. A large pediment with a cross mounted on its apex surmounts the central bay. Adjoining the pediment is a parapet with classical balusters that conceal the edge of the gable roof. The stair tower, which protrudes from the centre of the central bay, has an ornate zinc roof with small arched dormer windows and decorative round and arched stained glass windows. The symmetry of the facade is further emphasized by a set of wide masonry stairs positioned on axis with the stair tower that lead down to Ross Oval.

The southern facade of the building is much plainer than the northern facade and overlooks the Former Quadrangle (Edmund Rice Mall), an extension of the courtyard space at the rear of the Main Building. With the exception of the banded base, the walls are simply rendered and painted. The original timber windows have been replaced with aluminium to suit the new floor levels. The gable roof has dormers on its southern face. The tall narrow eastern facade has arched openings and other arched motifs, two storey banded pilasters and a parapet, in the form of a pediment topped with urns and a cross, concealing the gable end. The western facade, which was probably similar to the eastern facade, has been completely obscured by the adjoining Gallagher building.

The undercroft can be entered from either the Quadrangle on the south or a terrace overlooking Ross Oval on the north. Toilets and service rooms are located at the eastern and western ends. The main stair is accessed from the undercroft. It has been modified to suit new internal levels but the lower flights remain substantially intact. Slate stair treads are worn and damaged in some areas.

The upper floors contain classrooms accessed via a concrete verandah. The interiors of this building, including the verandahs, have been largely rebuilt. Although much of the external wall remains intact, the original classrooms have been removed, floor levels altered and doors and windows replaced. The concrete verandah is set back behind the line of the colonnade with which it no longer aligns. The alterations are not considered to be of cultural heritage significance.

=== Former Quadrangle (Edmund Rice Mall) and Big Ben ===
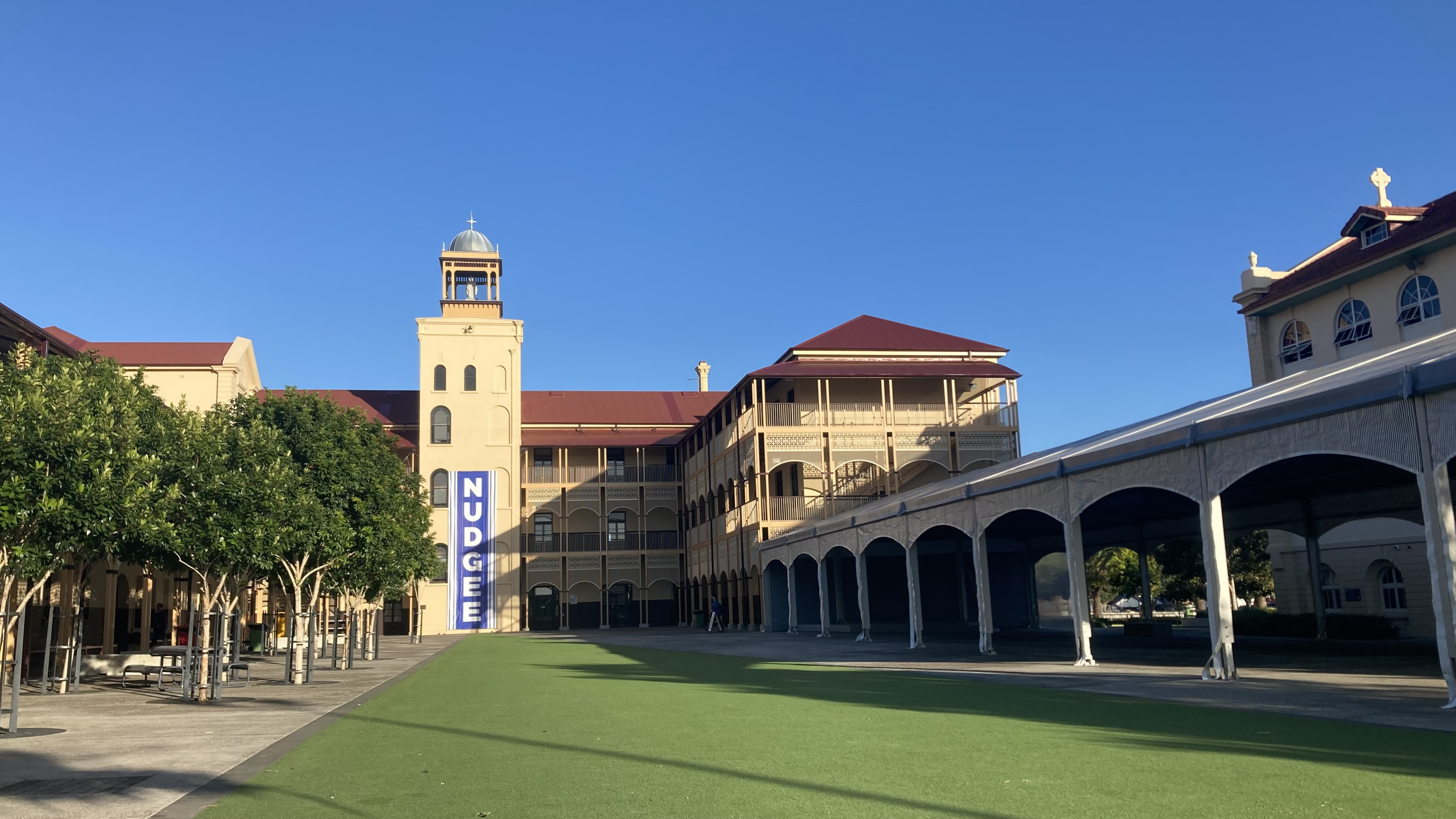
Back of the main building / Edmund rice mall

The original east-facing courtyard created by the construction of the Main Building has been further enclosed and extended by later buildings constructed on its northern and southern sides. Surrounded by the Dunne (Duhig) Building and the Gallagher Building on the north, the Main Building on the west, the South Wing and the Infirmary (Health Centre) on the south and the single storey Administration Building on the east, the Edmund Rice Mall is a focus within the school. It is a heavily used and centrally located outdoor space. The irregular shape of the mall and the variety of buildings surrounding it, together with the mixed planting, brick paving and planter boxes and bitumen play areas create an informal atmosphere.

Located at the eastern end of the mall is a freestanding metal clock mounted on a pillar. Known as "Big Ben", the clock has a round face enclosed in a cylindrical case that rests on a fluted column with a Corinthian style capital. Elevated on a rectangular stone base, Big Ben is now situated on the lawn in front of the Administration Building.

=== Ross Oval ===
Ross Oval, the principal sporting field at the college occupies a very prominent position on the college site adjacent to the intersection of Sandgate Road and Northumbria Road. A single grassed football field, it forms the setting for the northern facades of the Chapel and the Duhig Buildings, which are set on an embankment above the level of the oval. Masonry stairs are set into the embankment in front of the Duhig Building and near the entrance to the chapel. There is a row of palm trees along the top of the embankment in front of the buildings.

The oval is surrounded by a low timber picket fence. A small grandstand is located on the northern side of the oval. The grandstand is a simple timber-framed structure with stepped timber seating and a corrugated iron roof.

=== Wilkes Oval ===
Wilkes Oval, located on the eastern slope below Ross Oval, is the second most important sporting field at Nudgee College. The number two oval was named the Wilkes oval in 1982. The sign on the oval read: "This oval is dedicated to the memory of Bill Wilkes (Nudgee 1918-1921) Died 20-03-1977. For many years the Wilkes Bursary perpetuated Bill's memory but with its abolition some other tangible memorial was sought. Because of his position in the Forestry Department, Bill was in an ideal position to offer advice and assistance in beautifying the grounds of Nudgee College. This labour of love continued for fifteen years during which he came weekly to Nudgee to tend the trees around the College and to plan further development." The original slope has been cut and filled and retaining walls constructed to create the level playing field. Overlooked by the Dunne Building and the Administration Building, Wilkes Oval is bounded by Northumbria Road on the north, various accommodation buildings on the east and a car park and classrooms on the south. A grassy expanse mostly used for playing soccer, it is rimmed by mature trees on the north, east and west.

=== Former Senior School (Hodda Building) ===
A predominantly three-storey brick and concrete building, the former Senior School is located to the southeast of the Main Building on a sloping site. Originally consisting of three connected blocks arranged in a zigzag pattern around two landscaped courtyards, the former Senior School was notable for its clear functional layout and abstract facades. The three original blocks consist of a northeast dormitory block, a central dormitory block and a southwest classroom block. Major alterations and additions including a substantial extension to the classroom wing and the addition of a dormitory wing for Year 11 students have obscured the original design.

The original facades of the building are composed of a rigorous arrangement of cream brick walls and piers, aluminium framed strip windows, exposed concrete floor structure and flat roofs.

The interiors of the building have also been extensively altered.

Spaces that retain their original architectural character include the entrance foyers and staircases. The stairs have polished concrete treads and wide timber handrails. The dormitory in the northeast wing retains original roomettes, individual cubicles for sleeping and studying, enclosed by door height brick partition walls.

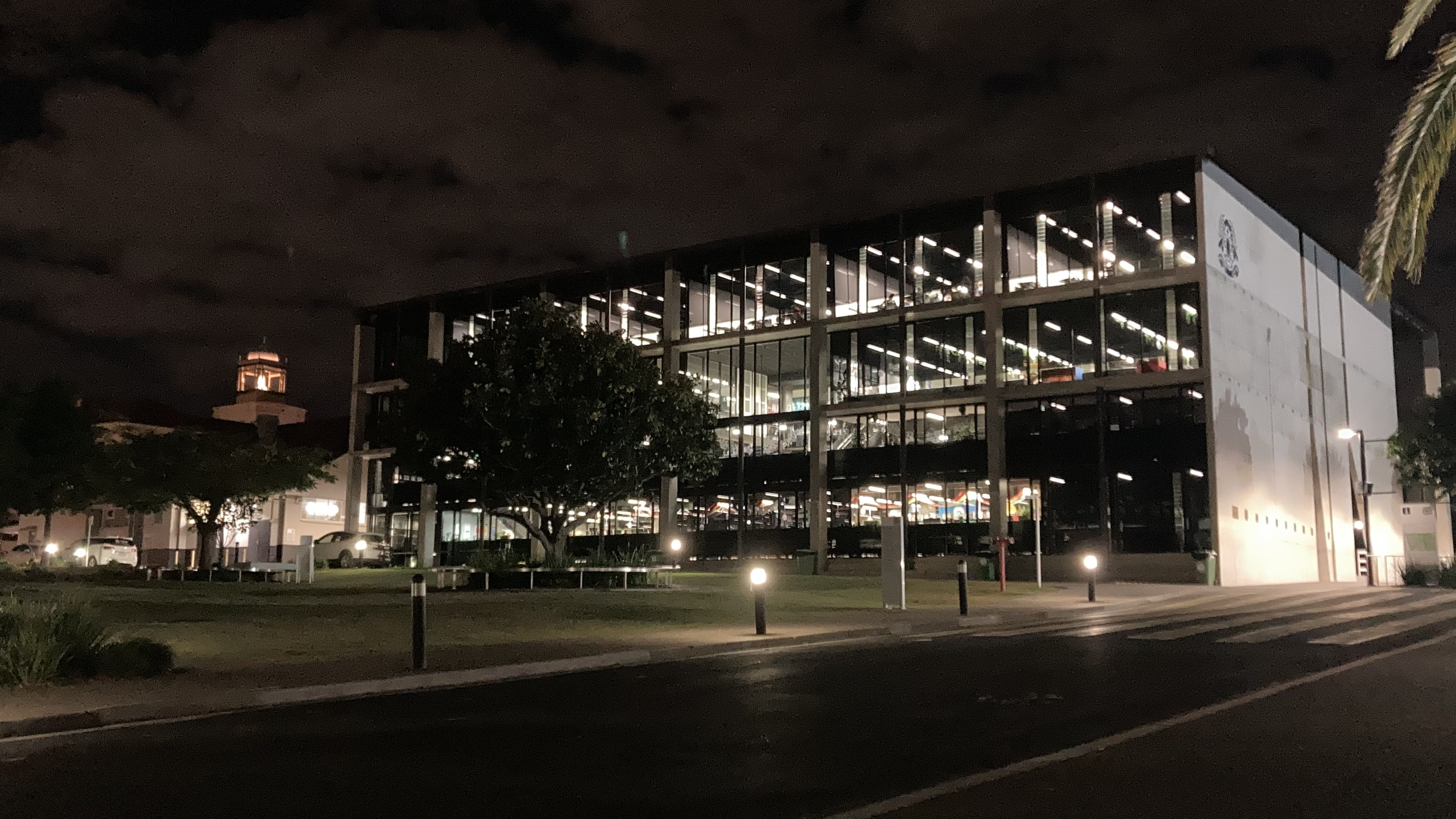
Front of the D.J Halny Learning Centre (library)

=== Remainder of the college grounds ===
Various ancillary buildings including a library, a number of halls, and staff and maintenance facilities are located around the grounds. Sports facilities in addition to Ross and Wilkes ovals include several sports fields ("the Flats"), tennis and basketball courts, golf course, swimming pool, rifle range and athletics field.

== Heritage listing ==
Significant structures for heritage listing include:

- Former Main Building:
  - Original 1890 building (south wing and central portion including tower)
  - Extensions to South Wing including 1900 building (Finance Department) and 1937 link
  - North Wing including Ryan Hall (1903–1904)
  - Southern extension
- Chapel (1914–1916)
- Former Dunne Building (1917–1919)
- Former Quadrangle
- "Big Ben" (1917)
- Ross Oval and grandstand (1927)
- Wilkes Oval (1934–35)

Structures not of cultural heritage significance include:

- Gallagher Building (1973)
- Infirmary (1975)
- Administration Building (1986)
- Kitchen extension to Main building (1950s)

The Buildings of St Joseph's Nudgee College were listed on the Queensland Heritage Register on 6 November 2006 having satisfied the following criteria.

The place is important in demonstrating the evolution or pattern of Queensland's history.

St Joseph's Nudgee College, opened in 1891, is the oldest purpose-built Catholic boys' boarding school in Queensland. Initially established to accommodate the increasing number of boarders enrolling at St Joseph's College, Gregory Terrace, the school provides important evidence of the development of residential education in Queensland. The emergence of Nudgee College as a boarding school in the late 19th century is evidence of the size and character of the rural Catholic population of the time. The college remains the premier Catholic boys' boarding school in Queensland and is significant for its important contribution to the upward social, cultural, economic and political mobility of Catholics in the Queensland community during the 20th century. The imposing and coherent architectural vision is part of a recognisable style of building (Italianate architecture in an elevated setting) favoured by the Catholic Church in Queensland, especially under Archbishops Robert Dunne and James Duhig, as an expression of Catholic aspirations in an Anglican and Protestant dominated society. Historically, St Joseph's Nudgee College belongs to a period of major Catholic building with widespread effects on the Queensland landscape and the Brisbane townscape in particular, and is important in illustrating this trend.

The place is important in demonstrating the principal characteristics of a particular class of cultural places.

St Joseph's Nudgee College has developed continuously on a large site and retains most of the original permanent buildings including the former Main Building. The imposing facades, prominent chapel, wide variety of classroom and residential buildings and significant outdoor areas such as the former Quadrangle and Ross and Wilkes ovals are important in demonstrating the principal characteristics of a large denominational boarding school in Queensland. The complex is an excellent representation of the evolution of Catholic educational architecture in Queensland over a period of almost one hundred years. The historic core contains the work of several prominent Queensland architects including Andrea Stombuco, James Percy Cowlishaw and Thomas Ramsay Hall, yet remains remarkably cohesive in form, style, materials and scale.

The place is important because of its aesthetic significance.

Situated on the "Nudgee Mound", the most prominent and elevated part of the site, the older buildings of the college with their sweeping facades and architecturally cohesive design form a landmark in the northeastern suburbs of Brisbane. The rendered Renaissance revival architecture set in extensive grounds and bounded by established trees is valued for its aesthetic qualities and contribution to the historical character of the area. Ross Oval has been used for sport and recreation from the earliest days of the college and became the primary sports ground for the college after it was leveled and the grandstand built in 1927. The oval is an integral part of the main building complex and makes a significant contribution to its aesthetic appeal.

The place has a strong or special association with a particular community or cultural group for social, cultural or spiritual reasons.

St Joseph's Nudgee College, has a special association for generations of Catholic families who have sent their sons to this school since 1891. The college is considered the premier Catholic boys' boarding school in Queensland, and has a special role in Catholic education in this state.

The place has a special association with the life or work of a particular person, group or organisation of importance in Queensland's history.

The college has a strong and special association with the Christian Brothers, the order which founded the college in the late 1880s and who continue their association with the school. Prominent Queensland Catholic churchmen including Brisbane archbishops have had a special association with the development of the college. The Dunne Memorial Block (now Duhig Building) was built from funds bequeathed by Robert Dunne, Brisbane's first Archbishop. Brisbane Archbishop Bathersby is a graduate of the college.
