= Department of Finance (1976–1997) =

Australian government department, 1976–1997

Department overview
- Formed: 7 December 1976
- Preceding Department: Department of the Treasury
- Dissolved: 9 October 1997
- Superseding Department: Department of Finance and Administration
- Jurisdiction: Commonwealth of Australia
- Headquarters: Canberra
- Employees: 587 (at 30 June 1997)
- Department executives: William Cole, Secretary (1976–1978); Ian Castles, Secretary (1978–1986); Michael Keating, Secretary (1986–1991); Steve Sedgwick, Secretary (1992–1996); Peter Boxall, Secretary (1997)

The Department of Finance (also called DoF) was an Australian government department with the mission to support and promote excellence in Commonwealth financial management and budgeting, and in program performance throughout the public sector. The department existed between December 1976 and October 1997.

== History ==
The department was split from the Department of the Treasury in 1976 with the aim to separate financial oversight functions from economic policy functions generally, emulating changes Canadian Prime Minister Pierre Trudeau had introduced to his government.

== Outcomes and scope ==
The department's mission was to support and promote excellence in Commonwealth financial management and budgeting, and in program performance throughout the public sector.

Information about the department's functions and government funding allocation could be found in the Administrative Arrangements Orders, the annual Portfolio Budget Statements, in the department's annual reports and on the department's website.

At its creation, the department dealt with:

- Examination, review and evaluation of governmental expenditure proposals and programs
- Collection and analysis of forward estimates of expenditure
- Administration of the Public Account

== Structure ==
The department was an Australian Public Service department, staffed by officials responsible to the Minister for Finance.

== References and further reading ==
- Department of Finance (October 1997), Department of Finance Annual Report 1996-97 (PDF), Department of Finance, archived from the original (PDF) on 13 November 1997
