= Ian Castles =

Ian Castles AO OBE

Secretary of the Department of Finance
- In office 2 January 1979 – 10 April 1986

Australian Statistician
- In office 10 April 1986 – 1994

Personal details
- Born: 20 February 1935 Kyneton, Victoria
- Died: 2 August 2010 (aged 75)
- Education: University of Melbourne
- Occupation: Public servant

Ian Castles AO OBE (20 February 1935 – 2 August 2010) was Secretary of the Australian Government Department of Finance (1979–86), the Australian Statistician (1986–94), and a Visiting Fellow at the Asia Pacific School of Economics and Government at the Australian National University, Canberra.

== Life and career ==
Castles was born in Kyneton, Victoria and educated at state schools in Sale, Wesley College, Melbourne and Melbourne University. In 1954, he joined the Australian Public Service in the archives division of the National Library of Australia, then located in Melbourne, and moved to Canberra in 1957. He joined the Treasury in 1958. He was appointed Secretary of the Department of Finance commencing from 2 January 1979. In 1986 he was appointed Australian Statistician.

Between 1995 and 2000, he was Executive Director and Vice President and of the Academy of the Social Sciences in Australia and he was also President of the International Association of Official Statistics.

He was a contributor to Online Opinion, appeared at events hosted by the Institute of Public Affairs and Centre for Independent Studies, and published papers with The Lavoisier Group. Ian Castles was known for his criticism of the Intergovernmental Panel on Climate Change, particularly its Special Report on Emissions Scenarios.

His interests included research into the information requirements for public policy (especially at the international level) and the history of economic thought.

Ian Castles died on 2 August 2010, aged 75. His death was in Canberra Hospital, from complications following a heart attack.

== Honours ==
Ian Castles was appointed an Officer of the Order of the British Empire in June 1978, and an Officer of the Order of Australia in June 1987.

== Publications ==
His publications include:

- Ian Castles and David Henderson (2003) The IPCC emission scenarios: An economic-statistical critique, Energy & Environment, vol. 14: nos.2–3.
- Ian Castles and David Henderson (2003) Economics, emissions scenarios and the work of the IPCC, Energy & Environment, vol. 14, no. 4.
- Castles, Ian (2000) 'Reporting on Human Development: Lies, Damned Lies and Statistics', In Facts and Fancies of Human Development. Castles, Ian (eds.). Canberra: Academy of the Social Sciences in Australia.

Government offices
Preceded by Roy Cameron	Australian Statistician; 1986–1994	Succeeded by William McLennan
Preceded by William Cole	Secretary of the Department of Finance; 1978–1986	Succeeded by Michael Keating
