= Jack O'Neill (statistician) =

Australian public servant

John Patrick O'Neill (1910 – 11 October 1998) was an Australian public servant, who served as Australia's Commonwealth Statistician (head of the Bureau of Statistics) from 1970 to 1975, and Australian Statistician from 1975 to 1976.

O'Neill was born in Wynyard, Tasmania where he attended primary school, later boarding at St Virgil's College in Hobart. In 1927, he began working at the Hobart office of the Commonwealth Bureau of Census and Statistics, and began studying for a Bachelor of Commerce degree at the University of Tasmania which he discontinued due to illness. In 1937, he transferred to the Bureau's Canberra office working under Roland Wilson, with secondments to the Bureau of Meteorology and Department of Commerce and Agriculture during World War II.

When the Commonwealth Statistician—his friend and colleague, fellow Tasmanian Keith Archer—took sick leave in 1970, O'Neill acted as Commonwealth Statistician until he was officially appointed in 1972, then continued as the Australian Statistician when the role and the Bureau were renamed in 1975, until he retired due to invalidity in August that year.

Government offices
| Preceded by Keith Archer | Commonwealth/Australian Statistician; 1972–1975 | Succeeded by William Cole |
