= Tasmanian School of Business and Economics =

Tasmanian School of Business and Economics (TSBE)
- Type: Public
- Established: 2013 as the College; 1890 as the Faculty of Business
- Chancellor: Alison Watkins
- Vice-Chancellor: Rufus Black
- Dean: Mark Bowles
- Location: Hobart, Launceston and Burnie, Tasmania and Sydney, NSW, Australia
- Campus: Urban
- Website: www.utas.edu.au

The Tasmanian School of Business and Economics (TSBE), formerly known as the Faculty of Business, was founded in 1890 and first offered degrees in Economics and is the business and economics school of the University of Tasmania. It offers the undergraduate Bachelor of Business and Bachelor of Economics degrees, as well as postgraduate degrees and a Master of Business Administration program. The School is also associated with the Australian Innovation Research Centre, as well as the Australian Institute of Health Service Management.

== History ==
The School was established in 1919 as the Faculty of Commerce offering Accounting and Corporate Governance education as a three-year Certificate and the Bachelor of Commerce, a four-year degree equivalent to an honours degree. Economic Geography and Economic History was later introduced as first-year year-long subjects. In 1949 the Bachelor of Economics was introduced alongside the Bachelor of Commerce, and Econometrics introduced as a third-year full year subject. In a short period of time in the 1990s, Tasmanian School of Business & Economics and a part of the College of Arts & Law were a single organisation as the Faculty of Commerce and Law. In 1997 the Faculty of Commerce creates three schools: Economics, Accounting and Finance and Management and in the early 2000 a finance major was introduced to the BBus and BEc degrees. In 2013 the three schools merged within the Faculty of Business to become the Tasmanian School of Business and Economics.

== Faculty and services ==
In addition to its academic programme, the school has several co-curricular activities including corporate internships for its undergraduate students.

The Tasmanian School of Business and Economics and the Australian Maritime College conduct Maritime and Logistics Management courses including the Bachelor of Business and Master of Business Administration programs.

== Partnerships and Professional Associations ==
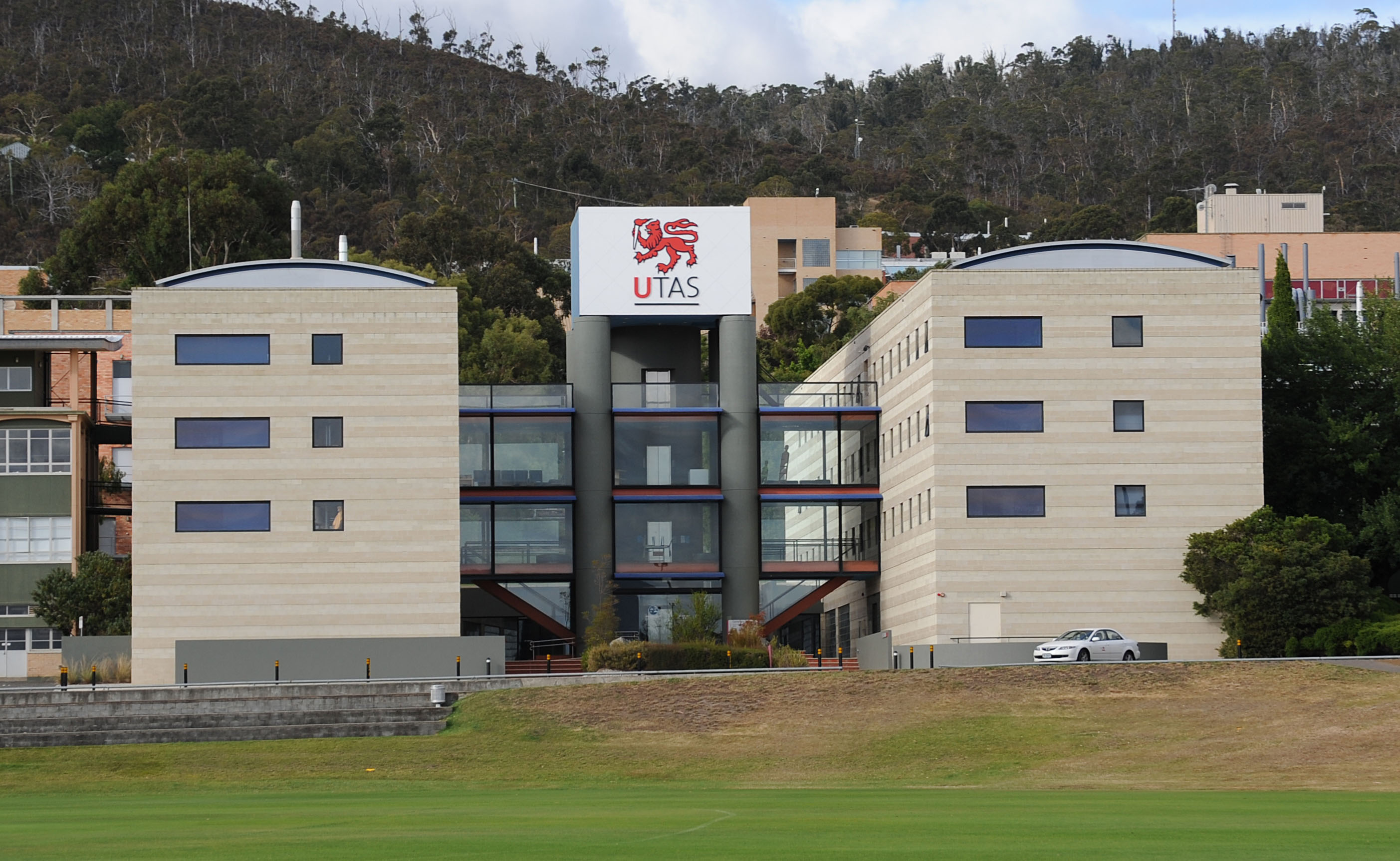
The Centenary Building, home to the School on the Hobart Campus

=== Professional associations ===
- Association to Advance Collegiate Schools of Business (AACSB)
- Association for Data-driven Marketing and Advertising (ADMA)
- Australian Human Resources Institute (AHRI)
- Australian Institute of Management (AIM)
- Australian Marketing Institute (AMI)
- Australian & New Zealand Academy of Management (ANZAM)
- Australia & New Zealand Marketing Academy (ANZMAC)
- Certified Practising Accountant Australia (CPA Australia)
- Chartered Accountants Australia and New Zealand
- Institute of Public Accountants
- The Council for Australasian University Tourism and Hospitality Education (CAUTHE)

=== Partnerships ===
- CFA Institute University Affiliation Program
- Financial Integrity Research Network
- Principles for Responsible Education (PRME)
- GARP Partnership for Risk Education
- National Centre for Econometric Research
- The Accounting and Finance Association of Australia and New Zealand
- Tasmanian Department of Treasury and Finance
- Economics Society of Australia – TPAS Branch
