= St Joseph's College, Nudgee =

School in Brisbane, Australia

St Joseph's Nudgee College
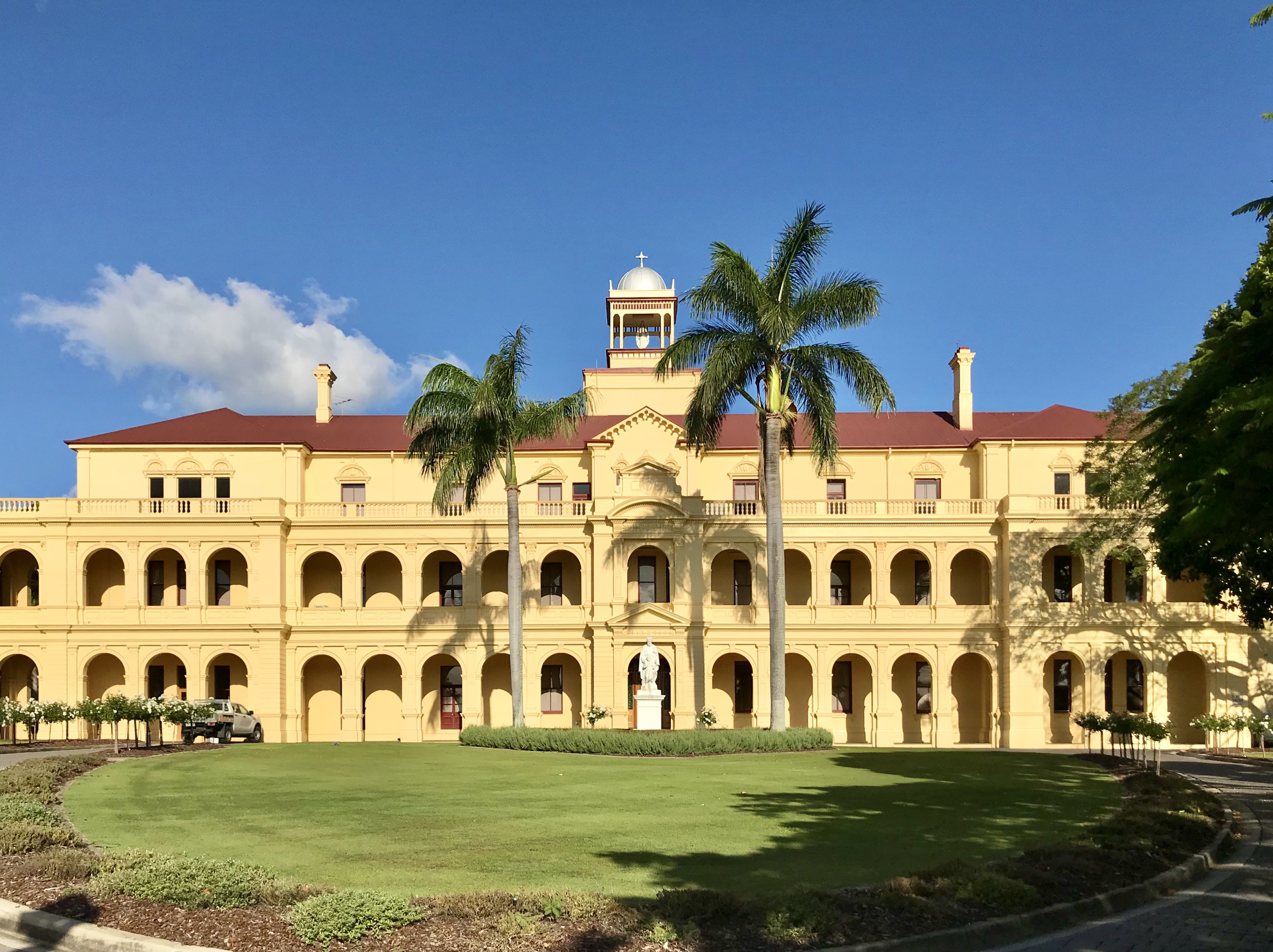
- St Joseph's College, Nudgee, pictured in 2017

Location
- Boondall, Queensland; Australia; 27°21′34.5″S 153°03′45.3″E

Information
- Other name: St. Joseph's Nudgee College
- Type: Independent primary and secondary day and boarding school
- Motto: Latin: Signum Fidei (A Sign of Faith)
- Religious affiliation: Catholicism
- Denomination: Congregation of Christian Brothers
- Established: 1891; 135 years ago
- Founder: Rev. Br. Patrick Ambrose Treacy
- Trust: Edmund Rice Education Australia
- Principal: Scott Thomson
- Years offered: 5 to 12
- Gender: Boys
- Enrolment: c. 1,700 (2026)
- Language: Australian
- Campus size: 136 hectares
- Colours: Blue and white
- Yearbook: Annual (2025)
- Affiliations: Australian Boarding Schools Association; Association of Heads of Independent Schools of Australia; Junior School Heads Association of Australia; Great Public Schools Association of Queensland
- Alumni: Nudgee College Old Boys
- Website: www.nudgee.com

St Joseph's Nudgee College (commonly referred to as Nudgee College or simply Nudgee) is an independent Catholic primary and secondary day and boarding school for boys, located in Boondall, a northern suburb of Brisbane, Queensland, Australia.

The school was founded by the Congregation of Christian Brothers in 1891 as a result of the large numbers of boarders at St Joseph's College, Gregory Terrace, also operated by the Christian Brothers, and insufficient room to house the boarders. Both schools share St. Joseph's College as part of their name and follow the Edmund Rice tradition, administered via Edmund Rice Education Australia. Nudgee currently caters for approximately 1,700 students from Year 5 to Year 12, including 300 boarders.

In 2006, some of the buildings of the school were listed in the Queensland Heritage Register.

St Joseph's is affiliated with the Australian Boarding Schools Association (ABSA), the Association of Heads of Independent Schools of Australia (AHISA), the Junior School Heads Association of Australia (JSHAA), and is a founding member of the Great Public Schools Association of Queensland (GPS).

== History ==
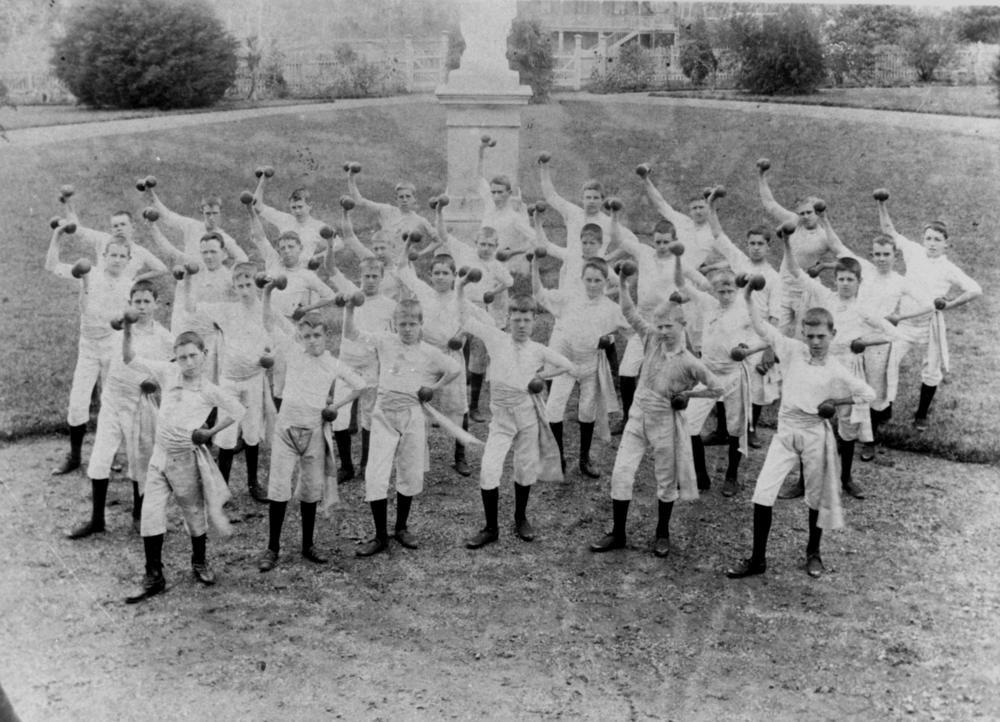
Dumbbell drill on the front lawn of Nudgee College, 1898

The college was established in 1891, as the boarding campus for St Joseph's College, Gregory Terrace. Its location was selected by Brother Patrick Ambrose Treacy, founder of the Australian Province of the Christian Brothers, at the request of the Archbishop of Brisbane at the time, Robert Dunne. Brother D. F. Bodkin was appointed first Headmaster.

At the time of Nudgee College's Golden Jubilee in 1941, the late Archbishop Sir James Duhig described the college as being "the jewel in the crown of the Christian Brothers' Schools in Queensland".

=== School buildings ===
The main building was completed in 1891; the architect was Andrea Stombuco. The façade of this building was used in the movie Phar Lap. The matching chapel was completed in 1916 and is used for weddings and funerals in addition to school celebrations. In 1993, after refurbishment, it won Royal Australian Institute of Architects Conservation Award and Regional Commendation. A second school building was completed in 1919. All three buildings were completed in the Italian Renaissance style.

In 1938, Nudgee Junior College was opened in Indooroopilly as a separate boarding and day school campus for younger boys. In 2015, the boarding facilities at Nudgee Junior were relocated to Nudgee and the Nudgee Junior site became a primary and secondary boys day school called Ambrose Treacy College.

Building has continued at Boondall, and the campus now has sporting and academic facilities including technologically advanced classrooms throughout the school, an award-winning multi-level learning centre, science laboratories, a vocational education centre, a 400-seat auditorium, 13 playing fields for cricket, rugby and football, 12 tennis courts, indoor and outdoor basketball and volleyball courts, a multi-purpose gymnasium, an Olympic grade athletics track, a weights room, Olympic 50-metre and 25-metre heated swimming pools, a sound-proofed, digital recording studio, art workshops, and cattle yards.

== Controversies ==
In July 1967, a 17-year-old student of the college, John Frances Treacy, was murdered outside the chapel by a 29-year-old man, John Martin Heywood. Heywood had befriended Treacy while in hospital in August 1966. Heywood, who had a long criminal history, was convicted of the murder, and spent the remainder of his life in prison or in mental hospitals.

In September 1996, Brother Stephen David McLaughlin, Nudgee College headmaster from 1988 to 1993, wrote an article in The Courier-Mail in which he claimed to have personally cared for more than 40 foster children in conjunction with Nudgee College and the Queensland Families Department. Subsequently, in August 2022, the Queensland State Government Children's Department confirmed McLaughlin was given "caring responsibilities" for foster children in the 1990s despite having never been "formally assessed" as a foster carer. Children's Department Minister Leanne Linard said she had ordered a review of the arrangement involving foster children being placed at the Nudgee College.

On 30 October 1997, McLaughlin delivered a speech at the Nudgee College annual speech night in which he defended the Christians Brothers against accusations of child sexual abuse claiming there is an "orchestrated campaign where few individuals are systematically targeting and attempting to destroy the hard-won reputations of brother after brother" and McLaughlin asked the Nudgee community to "fight for the Christian Brothers because we need you to support us in this time of real need." The entire speech was submitted to Parliament by Senator Herron on 11 November 1997.

In August 2008, a 59-year-old man from Richmond, Victoria, accused a priest from the college of abusing him and four other students who have since committed suicide due to the abuse. The college was unable to locate any records of the man attending the school and denied any wrongdoing.

On 30 April 2013, two students at St Joseph's Nudgee College, aged 16 and 17, were arrested on Tuesday on charges of possession and supply of steroids. Both were expelled.

In July 2017, the school's Nth Degree magazine published a photo of McLaughlin attending a birthday celebration at the college that took place on 31 May 2017 despite being under police investigation for child sexual abuse of a 12-year-old boy in 2015. Subsequently, in July 2022, a spokesman for Nudgee College said due to separation between the college and the Christian Brothers, they were not aware of any discussions in 2017 related to claims made against McLaughlin.

In March 2018 at the schools annual St Joseph's Feast Day Mass, current principal Peter Fullagar offered a public apology on behalf of the current St Joseph's Nudgee College community for abuse committed by religious and past staff at the school.

In March 2022, after several failed police investigations related to child abuse allegations in the late 1990s and early 2000s including allegedly taking children to stay with him in motels, McLaughlin was found guilty on two counts of abusing a 12-year-old child he had been babysitting in 2015.

In March 2022, The Courier Mail reported that Queensland police were looking into an alleged incident between a Nudgee student and a man believed to a bus driver after students shared details in TikTok videos. Nudgee Principal, Mr Peter Fullagar said "There is no proof of the identity of persons in the video. Nudgee College is working with the Child Protection Unit and relevant police authorities."

On 24 July 2022, ABC News Australia published a comprehensive report into McLaughlin and his relationship with Nudgee Old Boy and convicted child molester Dennis Norman Douglas. The report described Queensland Police Task Force Argos attempts to convict McLaughlin over a 25-year period including allegations he took children for overnight stays at popular motels and lavished money on his alleged victims and their families.

In October 2022, Nudgee College issued a statement to say it was conducting a review into the naming of one of its boarding houses after the school's former boarding master and deputy principal Brother Darcy Fidelis Murphy following the ABC News report into historical child sexual abuse allegations made against him.

=== Battle of the Colours ===
In 1991, the following was printed in the Centennial Rugby Program, dubbed "The Battle of The Colours", for the 100th anniversary of the annual Nudgee v Terrace rugby match:

Before Nudgee existed, St. Joseph's College, Gregory Terrace wore the colours Nudgee wears today – blue and white. A popular story, especially at Nudgee, is that when Nudgee began and had to choose it colours, there was a great debate as to whether the original school, Terrace, or its "extension" school, Nudgee, should have the blue and white. No amount of debate could solve the dispute so it was decided to rest the colour dispute on the first ever Nudgee-Terrace rugby match. Nudgee won and Terrace then chose colours diametrically opposed. The blue became red and the white became black.

— B. D. Honan in Nudgee College Centenary Rugby Programme, The Battle of the Colours, 1991.

The result of the Centennial Nudgee v Terrace rugby match was a 15-all draw.

== Academic ==
Nudgee College's teaching and learning ethos aligns with Art Costa's Habits of Mind framework.

In addition to a wide range of subject offerings, Nudgee offers students access to learning support, an enrichment and extension program and a vocational education and training program. The school is also a pioneer in the field of flipped learning.

== Co-curricular ==
As a member school of the GPS Association, Nudgee students are able to take part in cricket, rowing, volleyball, debating, swimming, football, tennis, cross country (athletics), rugby, basketball, chess, and track and field (athletics). The school also offers students access to an extensive music program, Theatresports, a robotics and steam club, and a cattle club, Art Club.

=== The Season ===
In 2017, Nudgee College was featured in series one of Onion TV's production of The Season. The series followed the school's first XV as they progressed through the 2017 GPS season, which ultimately ended with a tied Premiership with The Southport School. The Season aired on Fox Sports 3 in Australia and Sky Sports in New Zealand. The episodes are now available to watch on the school's YouTube channel.

== Nudgee International College ==
While Nudgee International College sat within the grounds of St Joseph's Nudgee College at Boondall, Nudgee International College was a completely separate entity and was not part of St Joseph's Nudgee College. In early 2012 it was announced that the Nudgee International College would close. The site has ceased to function as a separate college since late 2012. The building and facilities were turned over to the St Joseph's Nudgee College and the site was repurposed by the school for planned redevelopment.

== See also ==
- Catholic education in Australia
- List of schools in Queensland
- List of boarding schools
- Great Public Schools Association of Queensland Inc.
