= Francis Patrick Donovan =

Australian diplomat and legal professor

Professor Francis Patrick Donovan AM
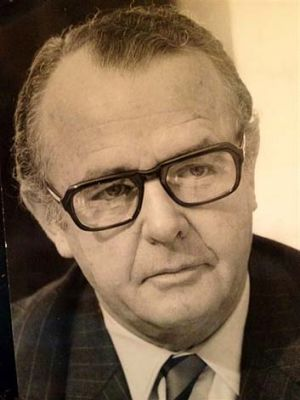

Australian Ambassador to the United Nations Office at Geneva
- In office 1980–1982

Australian Ambassador to the Organisation for Economic Co-operation and Development
- In office 1977–1980

Personal details
- Born: 1 February 1922 Ingham, Queensland, Australia
- Died: 3 February 2012 (aged 90) Paris, France
- Spouse: Maria Kozslik
- Children: Patrick and Cristiane
- Education: Melbourne Law School; Magdalen College, Oxford; University of Queensland
- Occupation: Diplomat
- Profession: Legal professor

Francis Patrick Donovan, AM (1 February 1922 − 3 February 2012) was an Australian academic, lawyer, and diplomat. He served as Australian Ambassador and Permanent Representative to the OECD, and Ambassador and Special Trade Delegate to the United Nations Office at Geneva. After retirement from the Diplomatic Service, he became a vice-chairman of the International Court of Arbitration.

== Early life ==
Donovan was born in Ingham, Queensland on 1 February 1922 to a Roman Catholic family. His father John was a Clerk of the Peace and Petty Sessions. He was educated at St Joseph's College, Nudgee and the University of Queensland. During his time at Queensland, Donovan became friends and edited the university newspaper with future Governor of Queensland Walter Campbell. After joining the Australian Militia at the beginning of World War II whilst at University, he then served in the 2nd Australian Imperial Force, where he was commissioned into the 55th/53rd Battalion and served as the battalion's Adjutant later in the war. Donovan then went as a Rhodes Scholar to Magdalen College, Oxford, where he graduated as a Bachelor of Civil Law. In 1950, in Chicago he met and married Maria Kozslik, a Hungarian, who later became an author and journalist.

== Educational career ==
On returning from the United States, Donovan became a Reader in Law at the University of Adelaide. In 1952, he was appointed Chair of Commercial Law at Melbourne University by his friend Zelman Cowen, who would later serve as 19th Governor General of Australia. During this time, he was a visiting professor at Columbia Law School and was President of the Melbourne University Staff Association. In 1953, the university granted him a Master of Laws degree. Whilst at Melbourne, Donovan published key case books for Australian Commercial law, and one publication 'Signed, Sealed, and Delivered: An Introduction to Australian Commercial Principles' was printed six times. Throughout his life he was also a Barrister of the Supreme Courts of Victoria and Queensland.

== Diplomatic career ==
In 1961, Donovan resigned from his chair in the Melbourne Law School to join the diplomatic service, specialising as a trade representative. His appointments began as a Commercial Counsellor at the Australian Embassy in Rome, and then becoming a Minister (Commercial) in the Department of Foreign Trade, Commercial Adviser to the Australian High Commission, London, and Deputy Head of the Australian mission to the European Economic Community.

After leaving the mission at the EEC, he was appointed Ambassador and Permanent Representative from Australia to the OECD, serving from 1977 to 1980. After leaving Paris, Donovan was made Special Trade Delegate to the United Nations Office at Geneva from 1980 to 1982 whilst retaining his honorific title of Ambassador. In Geneva, and in retirement, he remained a consulted expert on the GATT.

On Australia Day 1976, Francis Patrick Donovan was created a Member of the Order of Australia for his contributions to the Diplomatic Service, and in 1980 was inducted as a Knight of Magistral Grace into the Australian branch of the Sovereign Military Order of Malta.

== Later life and death ==
After retiring from the Diplomatic Service, Donovan retired to Paris, France and became a member of the International Court of Arbitration. In 1994, he became a vice-chairman of the Court, and for this service was created a Chevalier in the Legion d'Honneur in 1998.

His son, Patrick Donovan married author Tessa Dahl, daughter of Roald Dahl and Patricia Neal, and his daughter Cristiane was employed by the OECD.

Donovan died on 3 February 2012, aged 90, in Paris, France, and was buried in the grounds of Magdalen College, Oxford.

== Awards and decorations ==
Member of the Order of Australia (AM)	1976
1939-45 Star	1945
Pacific Star	1945
Defence Medal	1945
War Medal 1939-1945	1945
Australia Service Medal 1939–45	1945
Knight of Magistral Grace of the Sovereign Military Order of Malta	1980
Chevalier of the Legion d'Honneur	1998

Diplomatic posts
Preceded by Roy Cameron	Australian Ambassador to the OECD in Paris; 1985–1988	Succeeded by James Humphreys
