= World energy resources =

Estimated maximum capacity for energy production on Earth

World energy resources are the estimated maximum capacity for energy production given all available resources on Earth. They can be divided by type into fossil fuel, nuclear fuel and renewable resources.

== Fossil fuel ==
Remaining reserves of fossil fuel are estimated as:

Fuel	Proven energy reserves in zettajoule (ZJ) as of the end of 2009
Coal	19.8
Gas	36.4
Oil	8.9

These are the proven energy reserves; real reserves may be four or more times larger. These numbers are very uncertain. Estimating the remaining fossil fuels on the planet depends on a detailed understanding of Earth's crust. With modern drilling technology, wells can be drilled in up to 3 km of water to verify the exact composition of the geology; but half of the ocean is deeper than 3 km, leaving about a third of the planet beyond the reach of detailed analysis.

There is uncertainty in the total amount of reserves, but also in how much of these can be recovered gainfully, for technological, economic and political reasons, such as the accessibility of fossil deposits, the levels of sulfur and other pollutants in the oil and the coal, transportation costs, and societal instability in producing regions. In general the easiest to reach deposits are the first extracted.

=== Coal ===
Coal is the most abundant and burned fossil fuel. This was the fuel that launched the industrial revolution and continued to grow in use; China, which already has many of the world's most polluted cities, was in 2007 building about two coal-fired power plants every week. Coal's large reserves would make it a popular candidate to meet the energy demand of the global community, short of global warming concerns and other pollutants.

=== Natural gas ===
Countries by natural gas proven reserves (2014), based on data from The World Factbook.

Natural gas is a widely available fossil fuel with estimated 850 000 km^{3} in recoverable reserves and at least that much more using enhanced methods to release shale gas. Improvements in technology and wide exploration led to a major increase in recoverable natural gas reserves as shale fracking methods were developed. At present usage rates, natural gas could supply most of the world's energy needs for between 100 and 250 years, depending on increase in consumption over time.

=== Oil ===
Remaining oil: Breakdown of the remaining 57 zettajoule (ZJ) of oil on the planet. The annual oil consumption was 0.18 ZJ in 2005. There is significant uncertainty surrounding these numbers. The 11 ZJ of future additions to the recoverable reserves could be optimistic.

It is estimated that there may be 57 zettajoule (ZJ) of oil reserves on Earth (although estimates vary from a low of 8 ZJ, consisting of currently proven and recoverable reserves, to a maximum of 110 ZJ) consisting of available, but not necessarily recoverable reserves, and including optimistic estimates for unconventional sources such as oil sands and oil shale. Current consensus among the 18 recognized estimates of supply profiles is that the peak of extraction will occur in 2020 at the rate of 93-million barrels per day (mbd). Current oil consumption is at the rate of 0.18 ZJ per year (31.1 billion barrels) or 85 mbd.

There is growing concern that peak oil production may be reached in the near future, resulting in severe oil price increases. A 2005 French Economics, Industry and Finance Ministry report suggested a worst-case scenario that could occur as early as 2013. There are also theories that peak of the global oil production may occur in as little as 2–3 years. The ASPO predicts peak year to be in 2010. Some other theories present the view that it has already taken place in 2005. World crude oil production (including lease condensates) according to US EIA data decreased from a peak of 73.720 mbd in 2005 to 73.437 in 2006, 72.981 in 2007, and 73.697 in 2008. According to peak oil theory, increasing production will lead to a more rapid collapse of production in the future, while decreasing production will lead to a slower decrease, as the bell-shaped curve will be spread out over more years.

In a stated goal of increasing oil prices to $75/barrel, which had fallen from a high of $147 to a low of $40, OPEC announced decreasing production by 2.2 mbd beginning 1 January 2009.

=== Sustainability ===
Political considerations over the security of supplies, environmental concerns related to global warming and sustainability are expected to move the world's energy consumption away from fossil fuels. The concept of peak oil shows that about half of the available petroleum resources have been produced, and predicts a decrease of production.

A government moving away from fossil fuels would most likely create economic pressure through carbon emissions and green taxation. Some countries are taking action as a result of the Kyoto Protocol, and further steps in this direction are proposed. For example, the European Commission has proposed that the energy policy of the European Union should set a binding target of increasing the level of renewable energy in the EU's overall mix from less than 7% in 2007 to 20% by 2020.

The antithesis of sustainability is a disregard for limits, commonly referred to as the Easter Island Effect, which is the concept of being unable to develop sustainability, resulting in the depletion of natural resources. Some estimate that, assuming current consumption rates, current oil reserves could be completely depleted by 2050.

== Nuclear energy ==
=== Nuclear energy ===
The International Atomic Energy Agency estimates the remaining uranium resources to be equal to 2500 zettajoule (ZJ). This assumes the use of breeder reactors, which are able to create more fissile material than they consume. IPCC estimated currently proved economically recoverable uranium deposits for once-through fuel cycles reactors to be only 2 ZJ. The ultimately recoverable uranium is estimated to be 17 ZJ for once-through reactors and 1000 ZJ with reprocessing and fast breeder reactors.

Resources and technology do not constrain the capacity of nuclear power to contribute to meeting the energy demand for the 21st century. However, political and environmental concerns about nuclear safety and radioactive waste started to limit the growth of this energy supply at the end of last century, particularly due to a number of nuclear accidents. Concerns about nuclear proliferation (especially with plutonium produced by breeder reactors) mean that the development of nuclear power by countries such as Iran and Syria is being actively discouraged by the international community.

Although at the beginning of the 21st century uranium is the primary nuclear fuel worldwide, others such as thorium and hydrogen had been under investigation since the middle of the 20th century.

Thorium reserves significantly exceed those of uranium, and of course hydrogen is abundant. It is also considered by many to be easier to obtain than uranium. While uranium mines are enclosed underground and thus very dangerous for the miners, thorium is taken from open pits, and is estimated to be roughly three times as abundant as uranium in the Earth's crust.

Since the 1960s, numerous facilities throughout the world have burned Thorium.

=== Nuclear fusion ===
Alternatives for energy production through fusion of hydrogen have been under investigation since the 1950s. No materials can withstand the temperatures required to ignite the fuel, so it must be confined by methods which use no materials. Magnetic and inertial confinement are the main alternatives (Cadarache, Inertial confinement fusion) both of which are hot research topics in the early years of the 21st century.

Nuclear fusion is the process powering the sun and other stars. It generates large quantities of heat by fusing the nuclei of hydrogen or helium isotopes, which may be derived from seawater. The heat can theoretically be harnessed to generate electricity. The temperatures and pressures needed to sustain fusion make it a very difficult process to control. Fusion is theoretically able to supply vast quantities of energy, with relatively little pollution. Although both the United States and the European Union, along with other countries, are supporting fusion research (such as investing in the ITER facility), according to one report, inadequate research has stalled progress in fusion research for the past 20 years.

== Renewable resources ==
Renewable resources are available each year, unlike non-renewable resources, which are eventually depleted. A simple comparison is a coal mine and a forest. While the forest could be depleted, if it is managed it represents a continuous supply of energy, vs. the coal mine, which once has been exhausted is gone. Most of earth's available energy resources are renewable resources. Renewable resources account for more than 93 percent of total U.S. energy reserves. Annual renewable resources were multiplied times thirty years for comparison with non-renewable resources. In other words, if all non-renewable resources were uniformly exhausted in 30 years, they would only account for 7 percent of available resources each year, if all available renewable resources were developed.

=== Biomass ===
Production of biomass and biofuels are growing industries as interest in sustainable fuel sources is growing. Utilizing waste products avoids a food vs. fuel trade-off, and burning methane gas reduces greenhouse gas emissions, because even though it releases carbon dioxide, carbon dioxide is 23 times less of a greenhouse gas than is methane. Biofuels represent a sustainable partial replacement for fossil fuels, but their net impact on greenhouse gas emissions depends on the agricultural practices used to grow the plants used as feedstock to create the fuels. While it is widely believed that biofuels can be carbon neutral, there is evidence that biofuels produced by current farming methods are substantial net carbon emitters. Geothermal and biomass are the only two renewable energy sources that require careful management to avoid local depletion.

=== Geothermal ===
Estimates of exploitable worldwide geothermal energy resources vary considerably, depending on assumed investments in technology and exploration and guesses about geological formations. According to a 1998 study, this might amount to between 65 and 138 GW of electrical generation capacity 'using enhanced technology'. Other estimates range from 35 to 2000 GW of electrical generation capacity, with a further potential for 140 EJ/year of direct use.

A 2006 report by the MIT that took into account the use of Enhanced Geothermal Systems (EGS) concluded that it would be affordable to generate 100 GWe (gigawatts of electricity) or more by 2050, just in the United States, for a maximum investment of 1 billion US dollars in research and development over 15 years. The MIT report calculated the world's total EGS resources to be over 13 YJ, of which over 0.2 YJ would be extractable, with the potential to increase this to over 2 YJ with technology improvements – sufficient to provide all the world's energy needs for several thousand years. The total heat content of the Earth is 13,000,000 YJ.

=== Hydropower ===
In 2005, hydroelectric power supplied 16.4% of world electricity, down from 21.0% in 1973, but only 2.2% of the world's energy.

=== Solar energy ===
Renewable energy sources are even larger than the traditional fossil fuels and in theory can easily supply the world's energy needs. 89 PW of solar power falls on the planet's surface. While it is not possible to capture all, or even most, of this energy, capturing less than 0.02% would be enough to meet the current energy needs. Barriers to further solar generation include the high price of making solar cells and reliance on weather patterns to generate electricity. Also, current solar generation does not produce electricity at night, which is a particular problem in high northern and southern latitude countries; energy demand is highest in winter, while availability of solar energy is lowest. This could be overcome by buying power from countries closer to the equator during winter months, and may also be addressed with technological developments such as the development of inexpensive energy storage. Globally, solar generation is the fastest growing source of energy, seeing an annual average growth of 35% over the past few years. China, Europe, India, Japan, and the United States are the major growing investors in solar energy. Solar power's share of worldwide electricity usage at the end of 2014 was 1%.

=== Wave and tidal power ===
At the end of 2005, 0.3 GW of electricity was produced by tidal power. Due to the tidal forces created by the Moon (68%) and the Sun (32%), and Earth's relative rotation with respect to Moon and Sun, there are fluctuating tides. These tidal fluctuations result in dissipation at an average rate of about 3.7 TW.

Another physical limitation is the energy available in the tidal fluctuations of the oceans, which is about 0.6 EJ (exajoule). Note this is only a tiny fraction of the total rotational energy of Earth. Without forcing, this energy would be dissipated (at a dissipation rate of 3.7 TW) in about four semi-diurnal tide periods. So, dissipation plays a significant role in the tidal dynamics of the oceans. Therefore, this limits the available tidal energy to around 0.8 TW (20% of the dissipation rate) in order not to disturb the tidal dynamics too much.

Waves are derived from wind, which is in turn derived from solar energy, and at each conversion there is a drop of about two orders of magnitude in available energy. The total power of waves that wash against Earth's shores adds up to 3 TW.

=== Wind power ===
The available wind energy estimates range from 300 TW to 870 TW. Using the lower estimate, just 5% of the available wind energy would supply the current worldwide energy needs. Most of this wind energy is available over the open ocean. The oceans cover 71% of the planet and wind tends to blow more strongly over open water because there are fewer obstructions.
