= Renewable resource =

Natural resource that is replenished relatively quickly

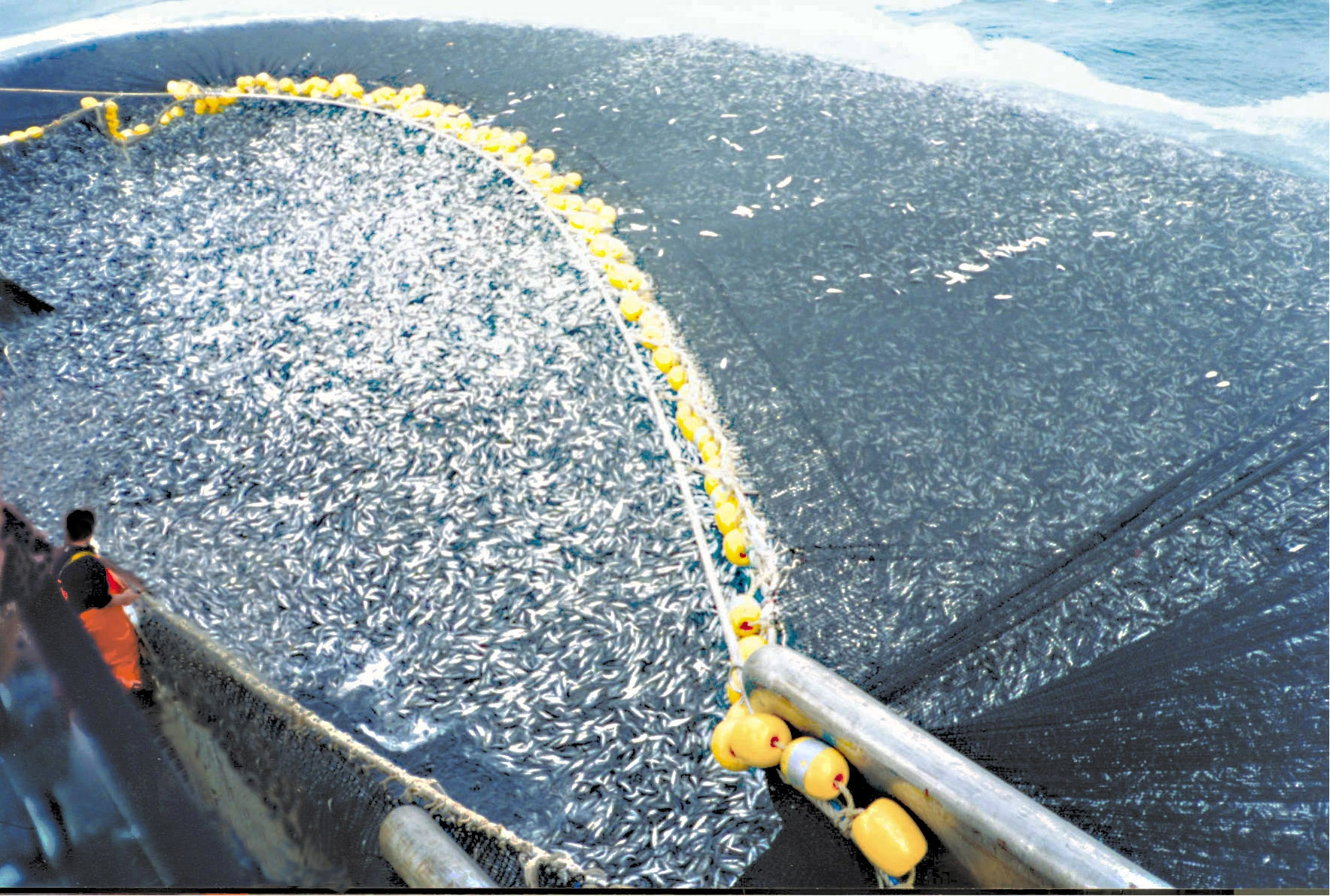
Oceans often act as renewable resources.

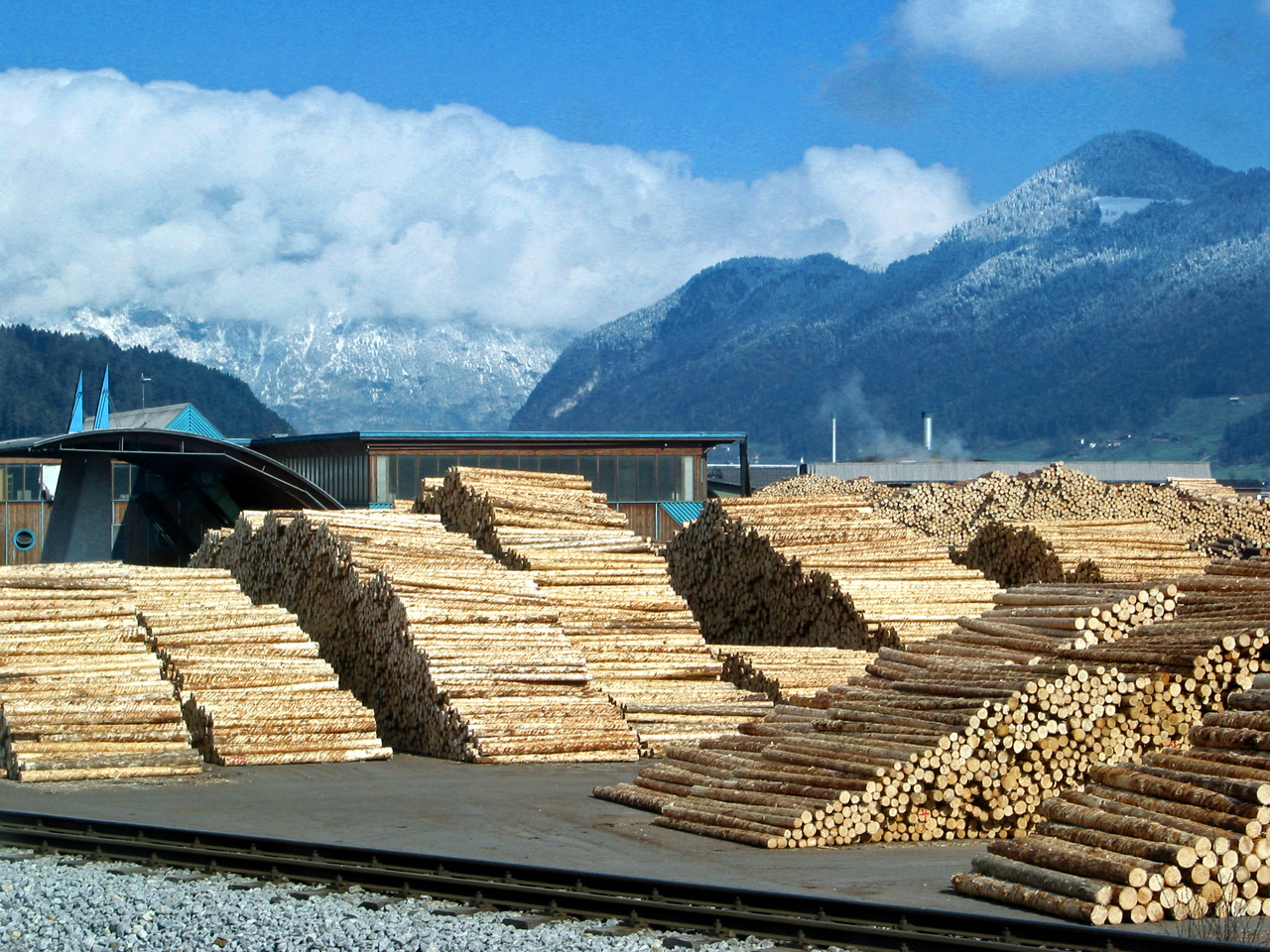
Sawmill near Fügen, Zillertal, Austria

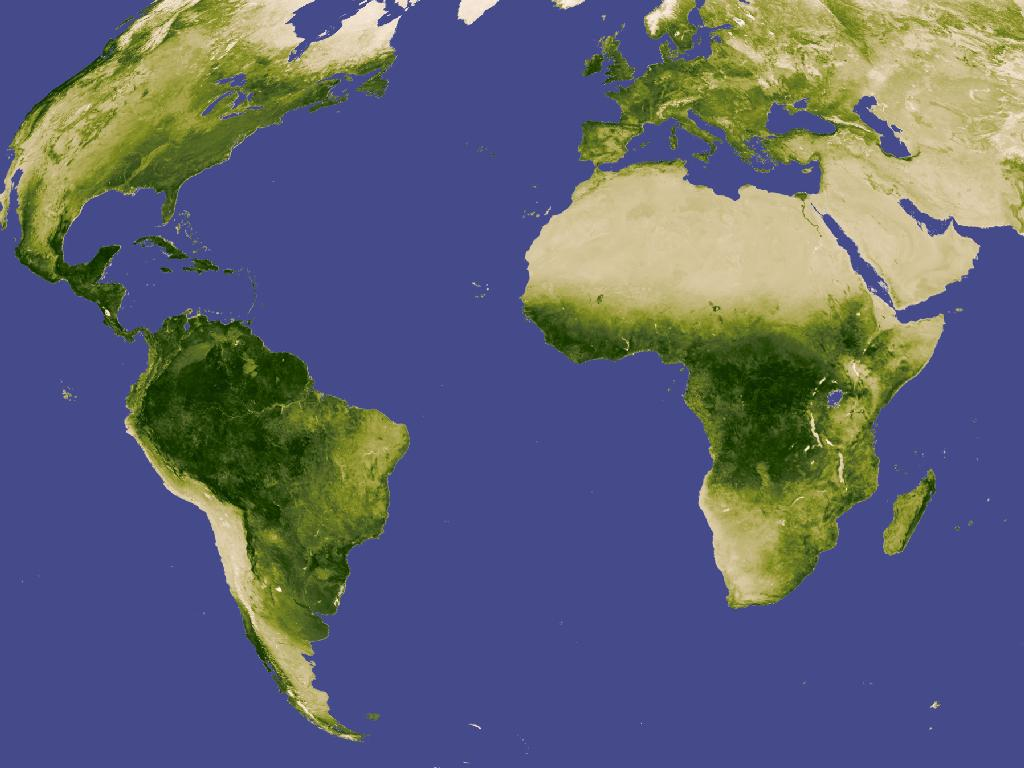
Global vegetation

A renewable resource (also known as a flow resource (Note: especially when emphasizing perpetual resources as well.)) is a natural resource which will replenish to replace the portion depleted by usage and consumption, either through natural reproduction or other recurring processes in a finite amount of time in a human time scale. It is also known as non conventional energy resources. When the recovery rate of resources is unlikely to ever exceed a human time scale, these are called perpetual resources. Renewable resources are a part of Earth's natural environment and the largest components of its ecosphere. A positive life-cycle assessment applies to the production of agricultural products and, to an extent, water resources. In 1962, Paul Alfred Weiss defined renewable resources as: "The total range of living organisms providing man with life, fibres, etc...". Another type of renewable resources is renewable energy resources. Common sources of renewable energy include solar, geothermal and wind power, which are all categorized as renewable resources. Fresh water is an example of a renewable resource.

== Air, food and water ==
=== Water resources ===
Water can be considered a renewable material when usage, temperature, treatment, and release are carefully controlled. Otherwise, it becomes a non-renewable resource at that location. For example, as groundwater is usually removed from an aquifer at a rate much greater than its very slow natural recharge, it is considered a non-renewable resource. Removal of water from the pore spaces in aquifers may cause permanent compaction (subsidence) that cannot be renewed. 97.5% of Earth's water is salt water, and 3% is fresh water; slightly over two-thirds of this is frozen in glaciers and polar ice caps. The remaining unfrozen freshwater is found mainly as groundwater, with only a small fraction (0.008%) present above ground or in the air.

Water pollution is one of the main concerns regarding water resources. It is estimated that industry uses 22% of global water. Major industrial users include hydroelectric dams, thermoelectric power plants (which use water for cooling), ore and oil refineries (which use water in chemical processes) and manufacturing plants (which use water as a solvent), it is also used for dumping garbage.

Desalination of seawater is considered a renewable water source, although it needs to reduce its dependence on fossil-fuel energy to be fully renewable.

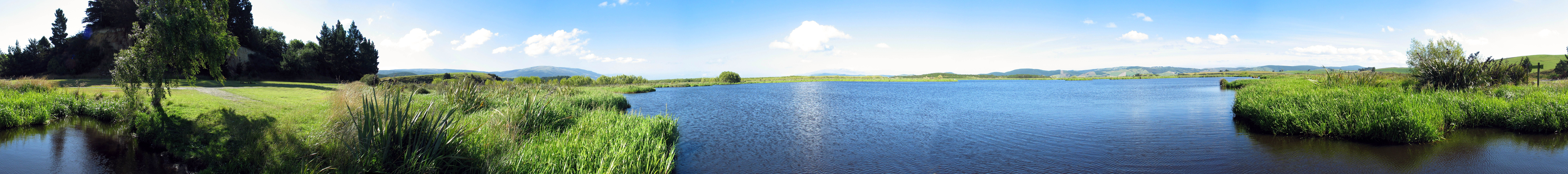
Panorama of a natural wetland (Sinclair Wetlands, New Zealand)

=== Non agricultural food ===
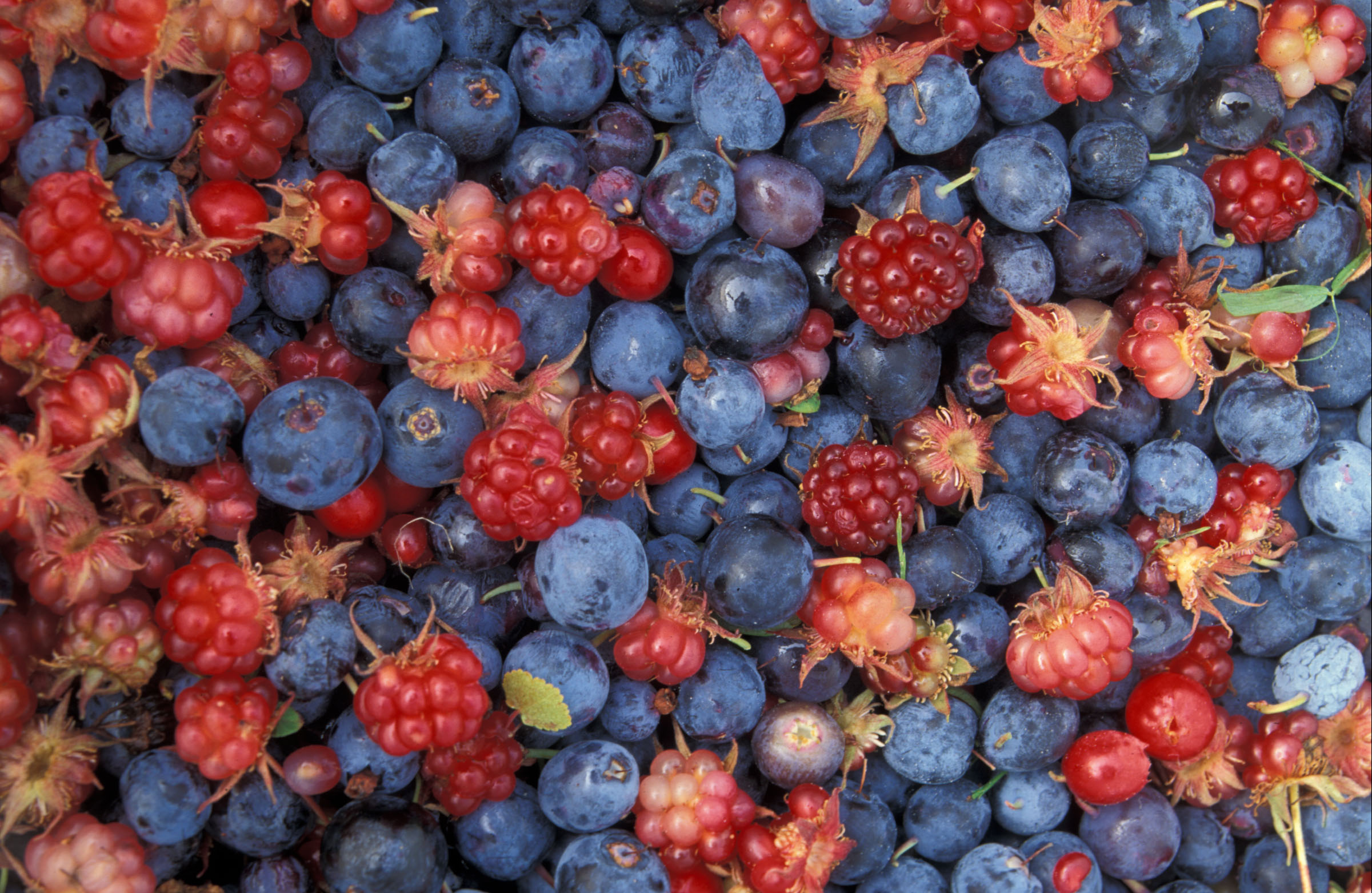
Alaska wild "berries" from the Innoko National Wildlife Refuge - renewable resources

Food is any substance consumed to provide nutritional support for the body. Most food has its origin in renewable resources. Food is obtained directly from plants and animals.

Hunting may not be the first source of meat in the modernised world, but it is still an important and essential source for many rural and remote groups. It is also the sole food source for wild carnivores.

=== Sustainable agriculture ===
The phrase sustainable agriculture was coined by Australian agricultural scientist Gordon McClymont. It has been defined as "an integrated system of plant and animal production practices having a site-specific application that will last over the long term". Expansion of agricultural land reduces biodiversity and contributes to deforestation. The Food and Agriculture Organization of the United Nations estimates that in coming decades, cropland will continue to be lost to industrial and urban development, along with reclamation of wetlands, and conversion of forest to cultivation, resulting in the loss of biodiversity and increased soil erosion.

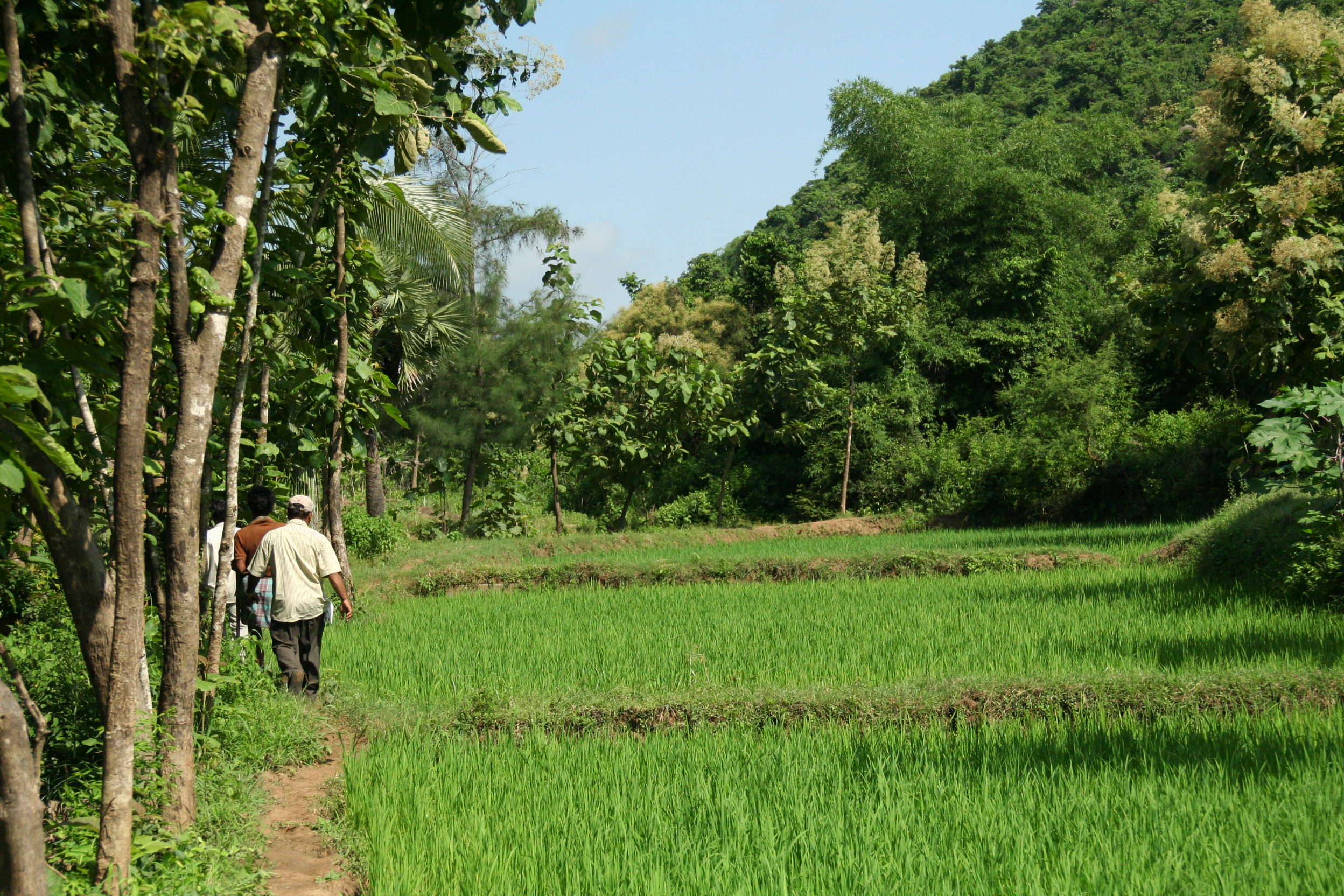
Polyculture practices in Andhra Pradesh

Although air and sunlight are available everywhere on Earth, crops also depend on soil nutrients and the availability of water. Monoculture is a method of growing only one crop at a time in a given field, which can damage land and make it unusable or reduce yields. Monoculture can also cause the build-up of pathogens and pests that target one specific species. The Great Irish Famine (1845–1849) is a well-known example of the dangers of monoculture.

Crop rotation and long-term crop rotations confer the replenishment of nitrogen through the use of green manure in sequence with cereals and other crops, and can improve soil structure and fertility by alternating deep-rooted and shallow-rooted plants. Other methods to combat lost soil nutrients are returning to natural cycles that annually flood cultivated lands (returning lost nutrients indefinitely), such as the Flooding of the Nile, the long-term use of biochar, and use of crop and livestock landraces that are adapted to less than ideal conditions such as pests, drought, or lack of nutrients.

Poor tillage practices can increase soil erosion rates. It is estimated that "more than a thousand million tonnes of southern Africa's soil are eroded every year. Experts predict that crop yields will be halved within thirty to fifty years if erosion continues at present rates." The Dust Bowl phenomenon in the 1930s was caused by severe drought combined with farming methods that did not include crop rotation, fallow fields, cover crops, soil terracing and wind-breaking trees to prevent wind erosion.

The tillage of agricultural lands is one of the primary contributing factors to erosion, due to mechanised agricultural equipment that allows for deep plowing, which severely increases the amount of soil that is available for transport by water erosion. The phenomenon called peak soil describes how large-scale factory farming techniques are affecting humanity's ability to grow food in the future. Without efforts to improve soil management practices, the availability of arable soil may become increasingly problematic.

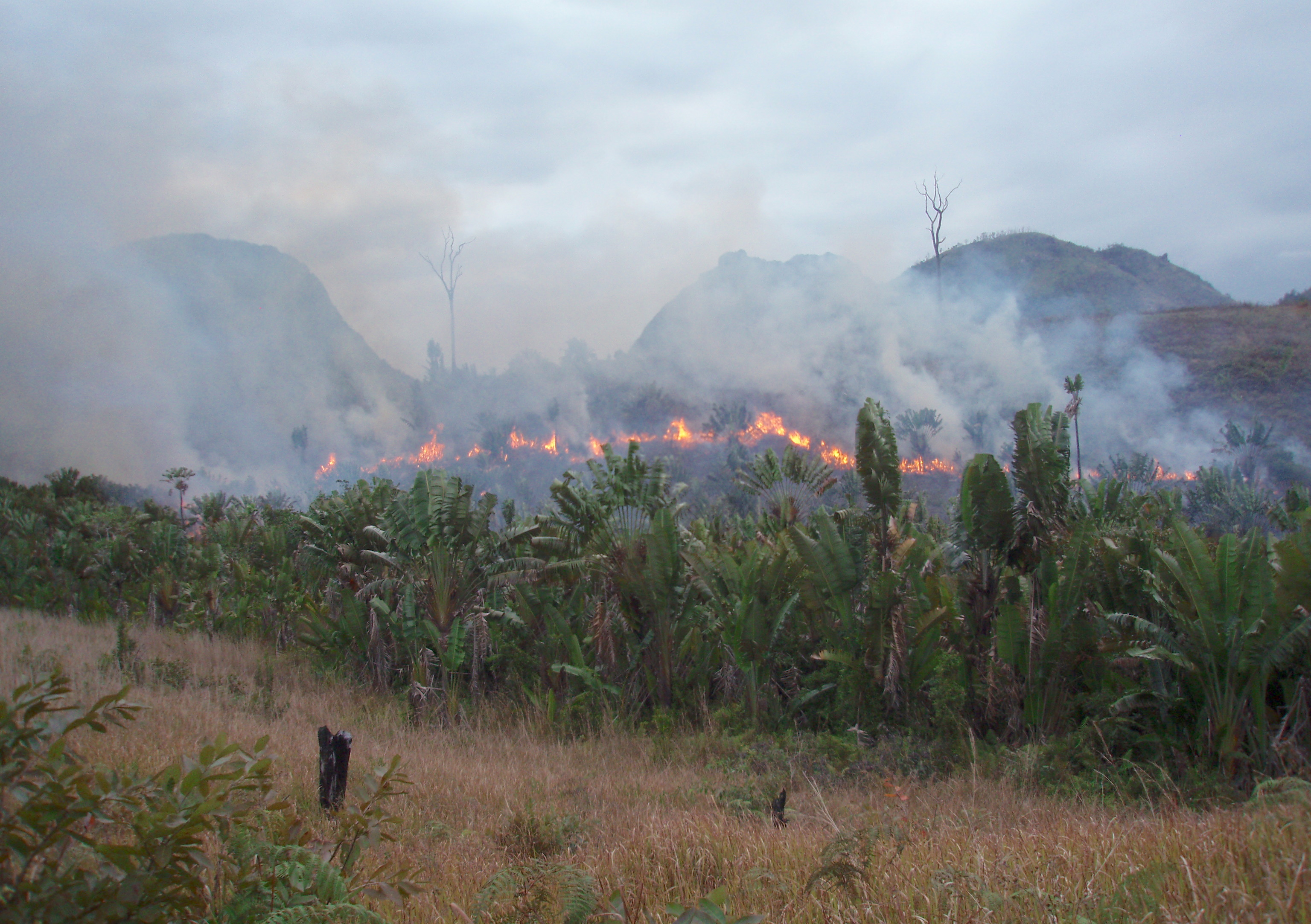
Illegal slash and burn practice in Madagascar, 2010

Methods to combat erosion include no-till farming, using a keyline design, growing wind breaks to hold the soil, and widespread use of compost. Fertilizers and pesticides can also have an effect of soil erosion, which can contribute to soil salinity and prevent other species from growing. Phosphate is a primary component in the chemical fertiliser applied most commonly in modern agricultural production. However, scientists estimate that rock phosphate reserves will be depleted in 50–100 years and that Peak Phosphate will occur in about 2030.

Industrial processing and logistics also have an effect on agriculture's sustainability. The way and locations crops are sold requires energy for transportation, as well as the energy cost for materials, labour, and transport. Food sold at a local location, such a farmers' market, have reduced energy overheads.

=== Air ===
Air is a renewable resource. All living organisms need oxygen, nitrogen (directly or indirectly), carbon (directly or indirectly) and many other gases in small quantities for their survival.

== Non-food resources ==
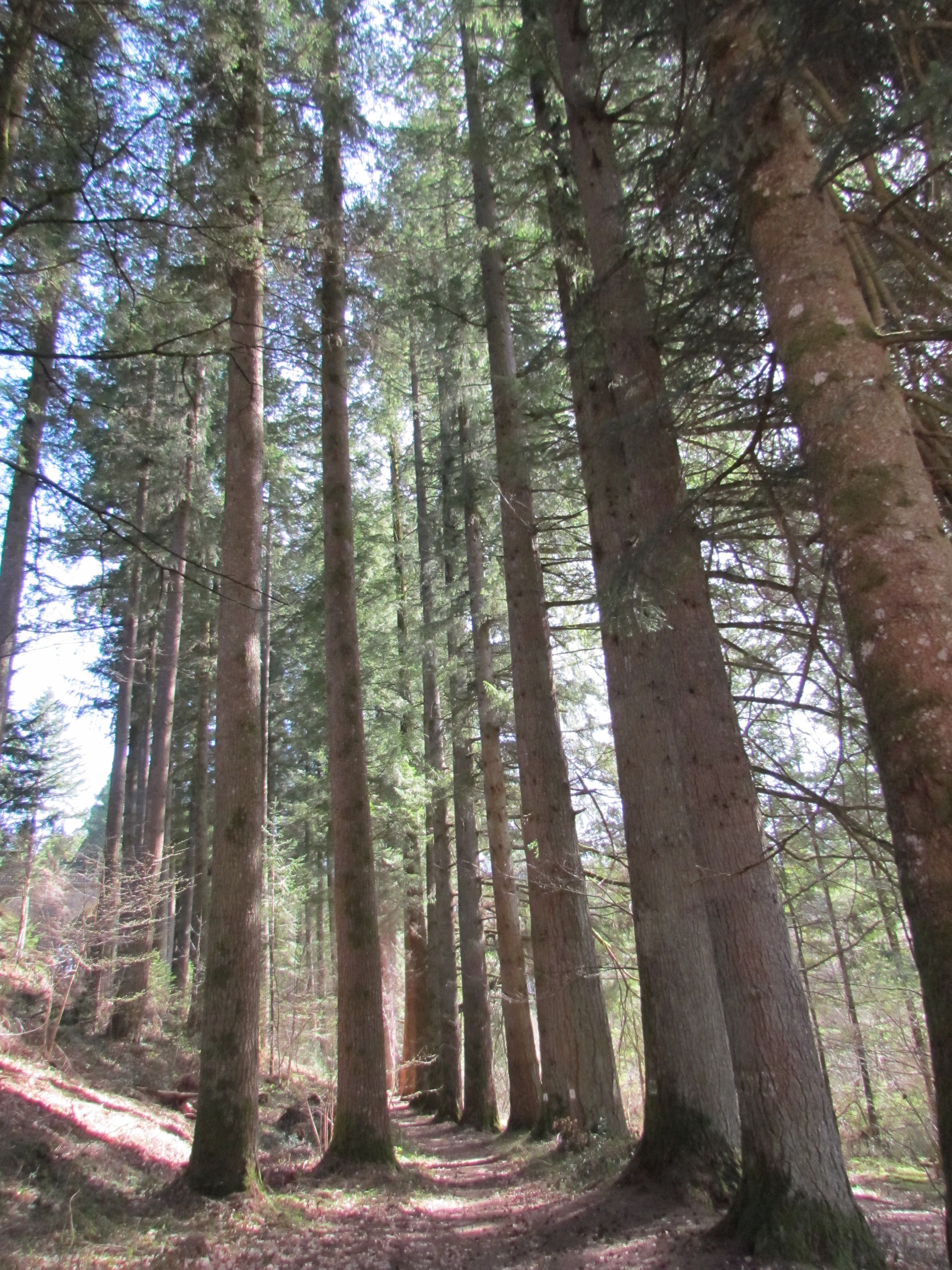
Douglas fir forest created in 1850, Meymac (Corrèze), France

An important renewable resource is wood, provided by means of forestry, which has been used for construction, housing, and firewood since ancient times. Plants provide the main sources for renewable resources, the main distinction is between energy crops and non-food crops. A large variety of lubricants, industrially used vegetable oils, textiles and fibre made e.g. of cotton, copra or hemp, paper derived from wood, rags or grasses, bioplastic are based on plant renewable resources. A large variety of chemical based products like latex, ethanol, resin, sugar and starch can be provided with plant renewables. Animal based renewables include fur, leather, technical fat and lubricants and further derived products, as e.g. animal glue, tendons, casings or in historical times ambra and baleen provided by whaling.

With regard to pharmacy ingredients and legal and illegal drugs, plants are important sources, however e.g. venom of snakes, frogs and insects has been a valuable renewable source of pharmacological ingredients. Before GMO production set in, insulin and important hormones were based on animal sources. Feathers, an important byproduct of poultry farming for food, is still being used as filler and as base for keratin in general. Same applies for the chitin produced in farming Crustaceans which may be used as base of chitosan. The most important part of the human body used for non-medical purposes is human hair as for artificial hair integrations, which is being traded worldwide.

=== Historical role ===
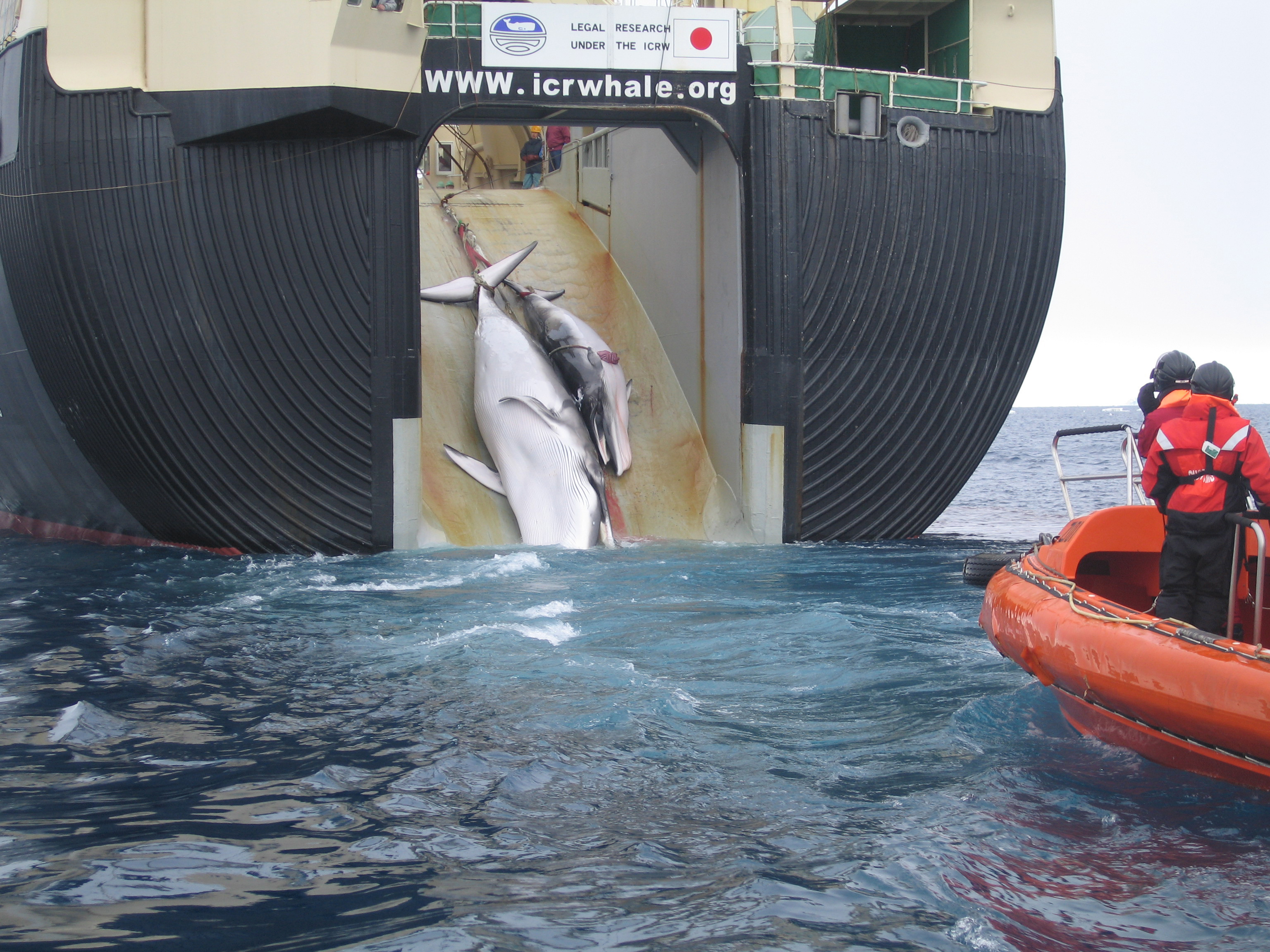
An adult and sub-adult Minke whale are dragged aboard the Nisshin Maru, a Japanese whaling vessel.

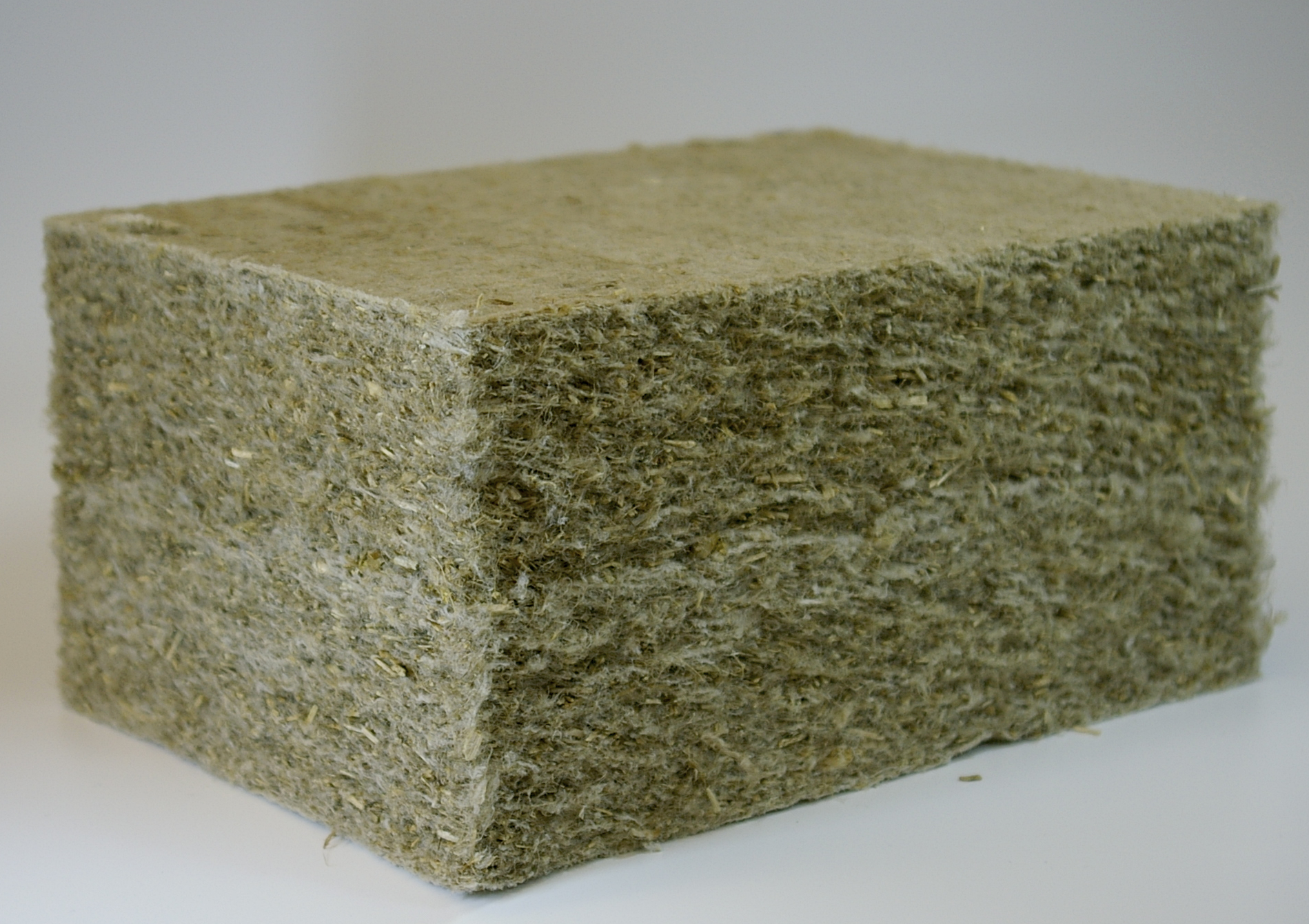
Hemp insulation, a renewable resource used as building material

Historically, renewable resources like firewood, latex, guano, charcoal, wood ash, plant colors as indigo, and whale products have been crucial for human needs but failed to supply demand in the beginning of the industrial era. Early modern times faced large problems with overuse of renewable resources as in deforestation, overgrazing or overfishing.

In addition to fresh meat and milk, which as food items are not the topic of this section, livestock farmers and artisans used further animal ingredients as tendons, horn, bones, bladders. Complex technical constructions as the composite bow were based on combination of animal and plant based materials. The current distribution conflict between biofuel and food production is being described as Food vs. fuel. Conflicts between food needs and usage, as supposed by fief obligations were in so far common in historical times as well. However, a significant percentage of (middle European) farmers yields went into livestock, which provides as well organic fertiliser. Oxen and horses were important for transportation purposes, drove engines as e.g. in treadmills.

Other regions solved the transportation problem with terracing, urban and garden agriculture. Further conflicts as between forestry and herding, or (sheep) herders and cattle farmers led to various solutions. Some confined wool production and sheep to large state and nobility domains or outsourced to professional shepherds with larger wandering herds.

The British Agricultural Revolution was mainly based on a new system of crop rotation, the four-field rotation. British agriculturist Charles Townshend recognised the invention in Dutch Waasland and popularised it in the 18th century UK, George Washington Carver in the USA. The system used wheat, turnips and barley and introduced as well clover. Clover is able to fix nitrogen from air, a practically non exhaustive renewable resource, into fertilizing compounds to the soil and allowed to increase yields by large. Farmers opened up a fodder crop and grazing crop. Thus livestock could to be bred year-round and winter culling was avoided. The amount of manure rose and allowed more crops but to refrain from wood pasture.

Early modern times and the 19th century saw the previous resource base partially replaced respectively supplemented by large scale chemical synthesis and by the use of fossil and mineral resources respectively. Besides the still central role of wood, there is a sort of renaissance of renewable products based on modern agriculture, genetic research and extraction technology. Besides fears about an upcoming global shortage of fossil fuels, local shortages due to boycotts, war and blockades or just transportation problems in remote regions have contributed to different methods of replacing or substituting fossil resources based on renewables.

=== Challenges ===
The use of certain basically renewable products as in TCM endangers various species. Just the black market in rhinoceros horn reduced the world's rhino population by more than 90 percent over the past 40 years.

=== Renewables used for self sufficiency ===
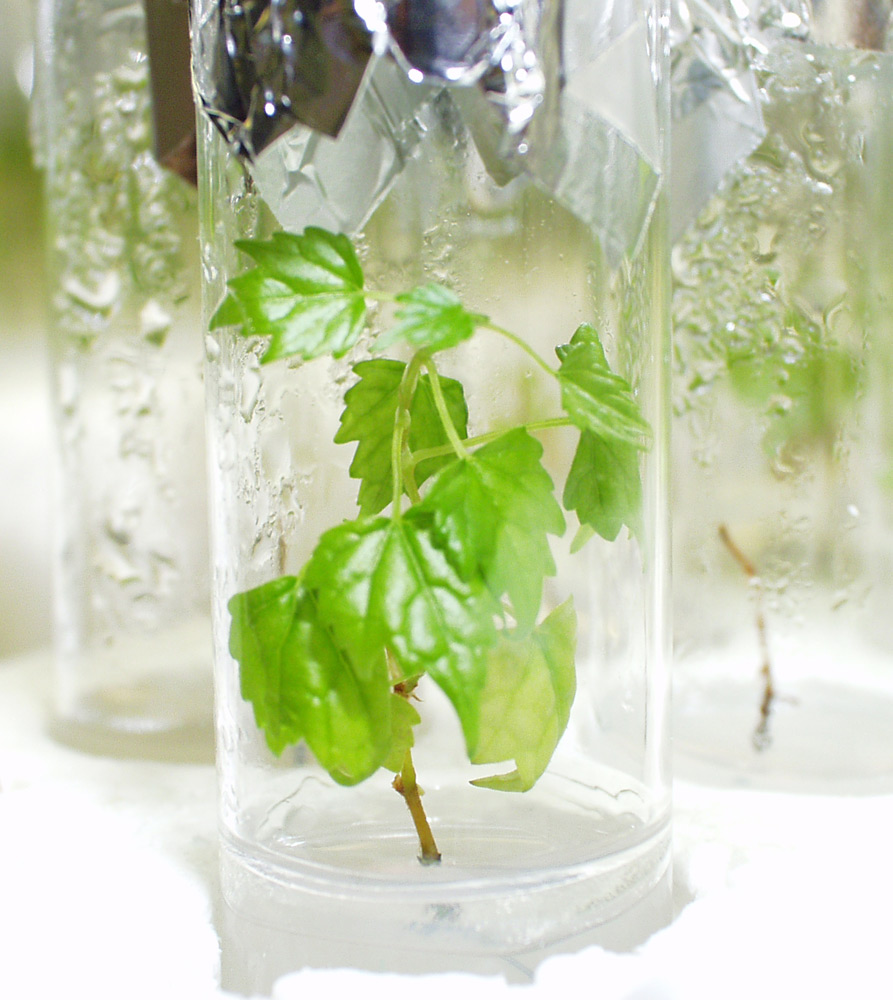
In vitro-culture of Vitis (grapevine), Geisenheim Grape Breeding Institute

The success of the German chemical industry till World War I was based on the replacement of colonial products. The predecessors of IG Farben dominated the world market for synthetic dyes at the beginning of the 20th century and had an important role in artificial pharmaceuticals, photographic film, agricultural chemicals and electrochemicals.

However the former Plant breeding research institutes took a different approach. After the loss of the German colonial empire, important players in the field as Erwin Baur and Konrad Meyer switched to using local crops as base for economic autarky. Meyer as a key agricultural scientist and spatial planner of the Nazi era managed and lead Deutsche Forschungsgemeinschaft resources and focused about a third of the complete research grants in Nazi Germany on agricultural and genetic research and especially on resources needed in case of a further German war effort. A wide array of agrarian research institutes still existing today and having importance in the field was founded or enlarged in the time.

There were some major failures as trying to e.g. grow frost resistant olive species, but some success in the case of hemp, flax, rapeseed, which are still of current importance. During World War 2, German scientists tried to use Russian Taraxacum (dandelion) species to manufacture natural rubber. Rubber dandelions are still of interest, as scientists in the Fraunhofer Institute for Molecular Biology and Applied Ecology (IME) announced 2013 to have developed a cultivar that is suitable for commercial production of natural rubber.

== Legal situation and subsidies ==
Several legal and economic means have been used to enhance the market share of renewables. The UK uses Non-Fossil Fuel Obligations (NFFO), a collection of orders requiring the electricity distribution network operators in England and Wales to purchase electricity from the nuclear power and renewable energy sectors. Similar mechanisms operate in Scotland (the Scottish Renewable Orders under the Scottish Renewables Obligation) and Northern Ireland (the Northern Ireland Non-Fossil Fuel Obligation). In the US, Renewable Energy Certificates (RECs), use a similar approach. German Energiewende is using feed-in tariffs. An unexpected outcome of the subsidies was the quick increase of pellet byfiring in conventional fossil fuel plants (compare Tilbury power stations) and cement works, making wood respectively biomass accounting for about half of Europe's renewable-energy consumption.

== Examples of industrial use ==
=== Biorenewable chemicals ===
Biorenewable chemicals are chemicals created by biological organisms that provide feedstocks for the chemical industry. Biorenewable chemicals can provide solar-energy-powered substitutes for the petroleum-based carbon feedstocks that currently supply the chemical industry. The tremendous diversity of enzymes in biological organisms, and the potential for synthetic biology to alter these enzymes to create yet new chemical functionalities, can drive the chemical industry. A major platform for creation of new chemicals is the polyketide biosynthetic pathway, which generates chemicals containing repeated alkyl chain units with potential for a wide variety of functional groups at the different carbon atoms. Polyurethane research is ongoing that specifically uses renewable resources.

=== Bioplastics ===
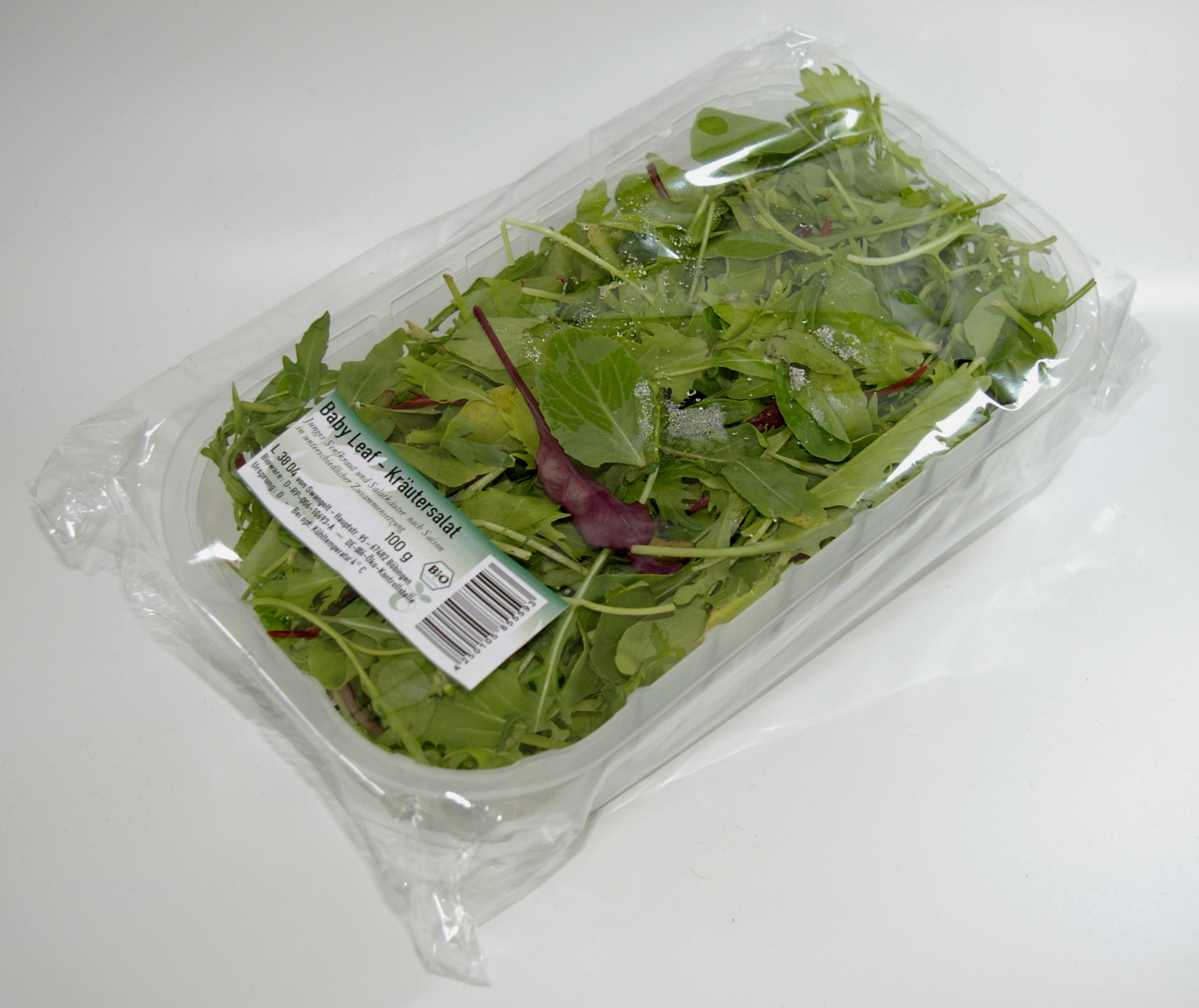
A packaging blister made from cellulose acetate, a bioplastic

Bioplastics are a form of plastics derived from renewable biomass sources, such as vegetable fats and oils, lignin, corn starch, pea starch or microbiota. The most common form of bioplastic is thermoplastic starch. Other forms include Cellulose bioplastics, biopolyester, Polylactic acid, and bio-derived polyethylene.

The production and use of bioplastics is generally regarded as a more sustainable activity when compared to plastic production from petroleum (petroplastic); however, manufacturing of bioplastic materials is often still reliant upon petroleum as an energy and materials source. Because of the fragmentation in the market and ambiguous definitions it is difficult to describe the total market size for bioplastics, but the global production capacity is estimated at 327,000 tonnes. In contrast, global consumption of all flexible packaging is estimated at 12.3 million tonnes.

=== Bioasphalt ===
Bioasphalt is an asphalt alternative made from non-petroleum based renewable resources. Manufacturing sources of bioasphalt include sugar, molasses and rice, corn and potato starches, and vegetable oil based waste. Asphalt made with vegetable oil based binders was patented by Colas SA in France in 2004.

=== Renewable energy ===
Renewable energy refers to the provision of energy via renewable resources which are naturally replenished as fast as they are being used. Examples are sunlight, wind, biomass, rain, tides, waves and geothermal heat. Renewable energy may replace conventional fuels in four distinct markets, namely electricity generation, hot water/space heating, motor fuels, and rural (off-grid) energy services. Manufacturing of renewable energy devices uses non-renewable resources such as mined metals and land surface.

=== Biomass ===
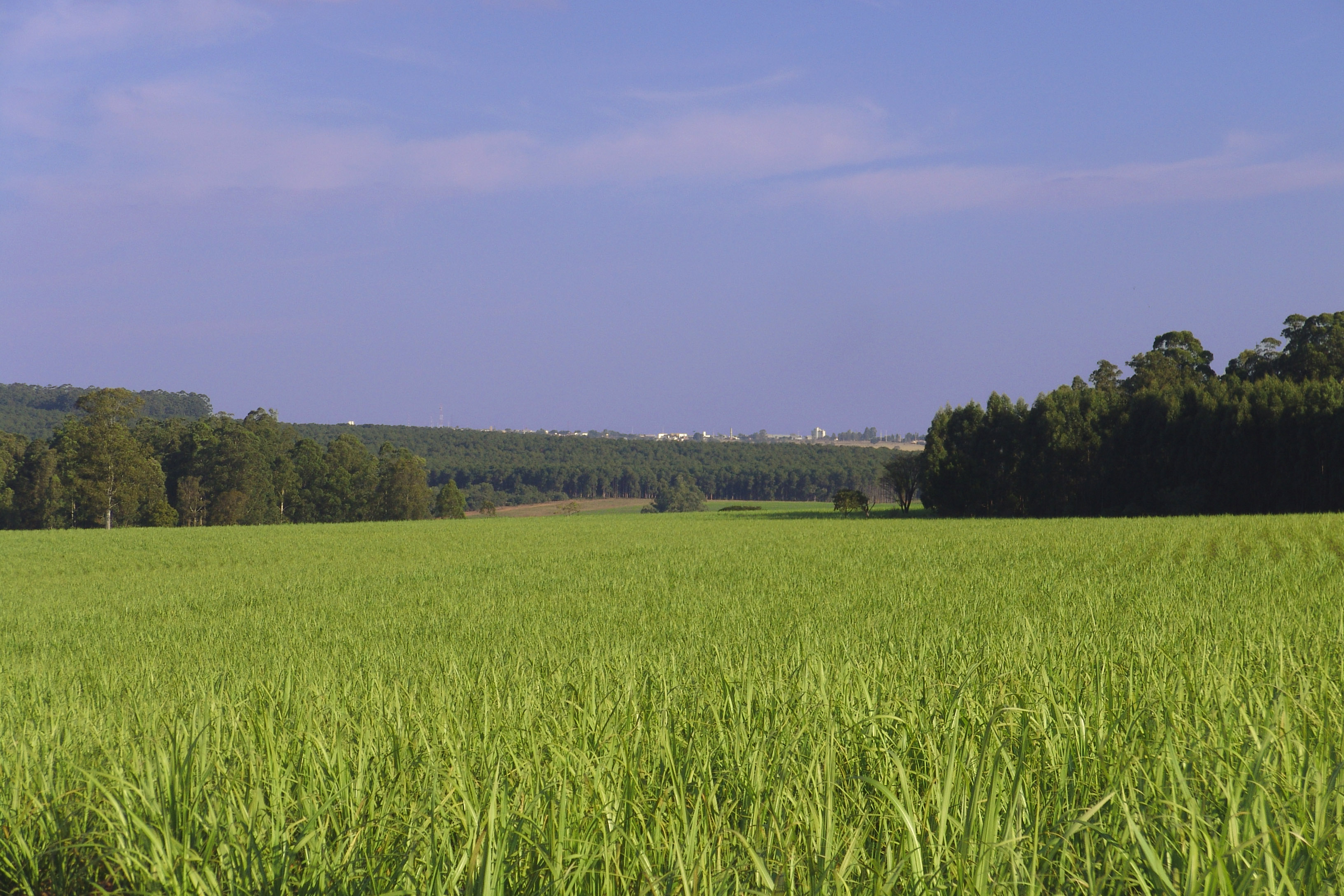
A sugarcane plantation in Brazil (State of São Paulo). Cane is used for biomass energy.

Biomass is referring to biological material from living, or recently living organisms, most often referring to plants or plant-derived materials.

Sustainable harvesting and use of renewable resources (i.e., maintaining a positive renewal rate) can reduce air pollution, soil contamination, habitat destruction and land degradation. Biomass energy is derived from six distinct energy sources: garbage, wood, plants, waste, landfill gases, and alcohol fuels. Historically, humans have harnessed biomass-derived energy since the advent of burning wood to make fire, and wood remains the largest biomass energy source today.

However, low tech use of biomass, which still amounts for more than 10% of world energy needs may induce indoor air pollution in developing nations and results in between 1.5 million and 2 million deaths in 2000.

The biomass used for electricity generation varies by region. Forest by-products, such as wood residues, are common in the United States. Agricultural waste is common in Mauritius (sugar cane residue) and Southeast Asia (rice husks). Animal husbandry residues, such as poultry litter, are common in the UK. The biomass power generating industry in the United States, which consists of approximately 11,000 MW of summer operating capacity actively supplying power to the grid, produces about 1.4 percent of the U.S. electricity supply.

=== Biofuel ===
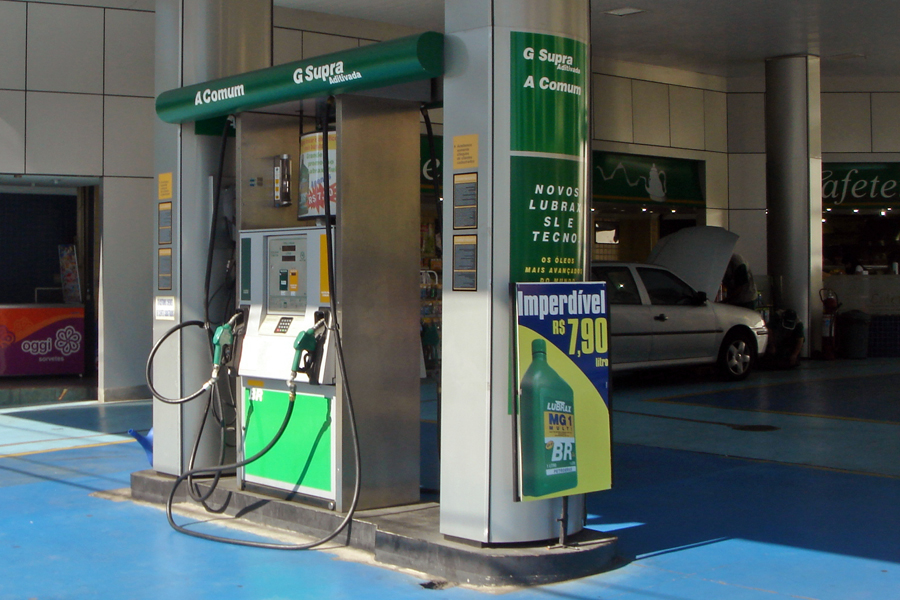
Brazil has bioethanol made from sugarcane available throughout the country. Shown a typical Petrobras gas station at São Paulo with dual fuel service, marked A for alcohol (ethanol) and G for gasoline.

A biofuel is a type of fuel whose energy is derived from biological carbon fixation. Biofuels include fuels derived from biomass conversion, as well as solid biomass, liquid fuels and various biogases.

Bioethanol is an alcohol made by fermentation, mostly from carbohydrates produced in sugar or starch crops such as corn, sugarcane or switchgrass.

Biodiesel is made from vegetable oils and animal fats. Biodiesel is produced from oils or fats using transesterification and is the most common biofuel in Europe.

Biogas is methane produced by the process of anaerobic digestion of organic material by anaerobes., etc. is also a renewable source of energy.

=== Biogas ===
Biogas typically refers to a mixture of gases produced by the breakdown of organic matter in the absence of oxygen. Biogas is produced by anaerobic digestion with anaerobic bacteria or fermentation of biodegradable materials such as manure, sewage, municipal waste, green waste, plant material, and crops. It is primarily methane (CH_{4}) and carbon dioxide (CO_{2}) and may have small amounts of hydrogen sulphide (H_{2}S), moisture and siloxanes.

=== Natural fibre ===
Natural fibres are a class of hair-like materials that are continuous filaments or are in discrete elongated pieces, similar to pieces of thread. They can be used as a component of composite materials. They can also be matted into sheets to make products such as paper or felt. Fibres are of two types: natural fibre which consists of animal and plant fibres, and man made fibre which consists of synthetic fibres and regenerated fibres.

== Threats to renewable resources ==
Renewable resources are endangered by non-regulated industrial developments and growth. They must be carefully managed to avoid exceeding the natural world's capacity to replenish them. A life cycle assessment provides a systematic means of evaluating renewability. This is a matter of sustainability in the natural environment.

=== Overfishing ===
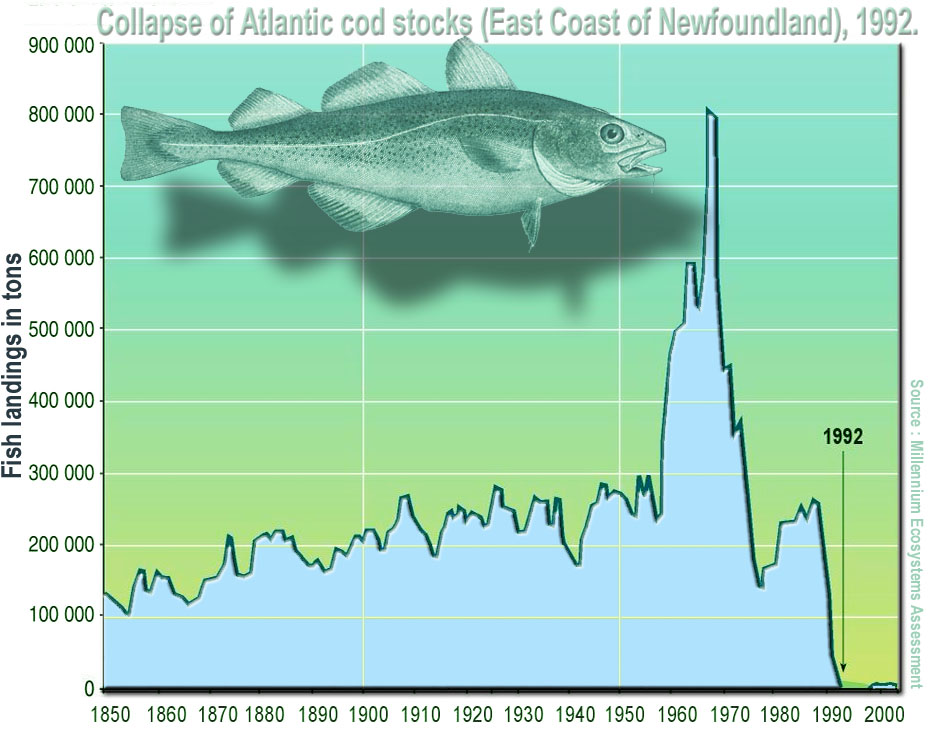
Atlantic cod stocks severely overfished leading to abrupt collapse

National Geographic has described ocean over fishing as "simply the taking of wildlife from the sea at rates too high for fished species to replace themselves."

Tuna meat is driving overfishing as to endanger some species like the bluefin tuna. The European Community and other organisations are trying to regulate fishery as to protect species and to prevent their extinctions. The United Nations Convention on the Law of the Sea treaty deals with aspects of overfishing in articles 61, 62, and 65.

Examples of overfishing exist in areas such as the North Sea of Europe, the Grand Banks of North America and the East China Sea of Asia.

The decline of penguin population is caused in part by overfishing, caused by human competition over the same renewable resources

=== Deforestation ===
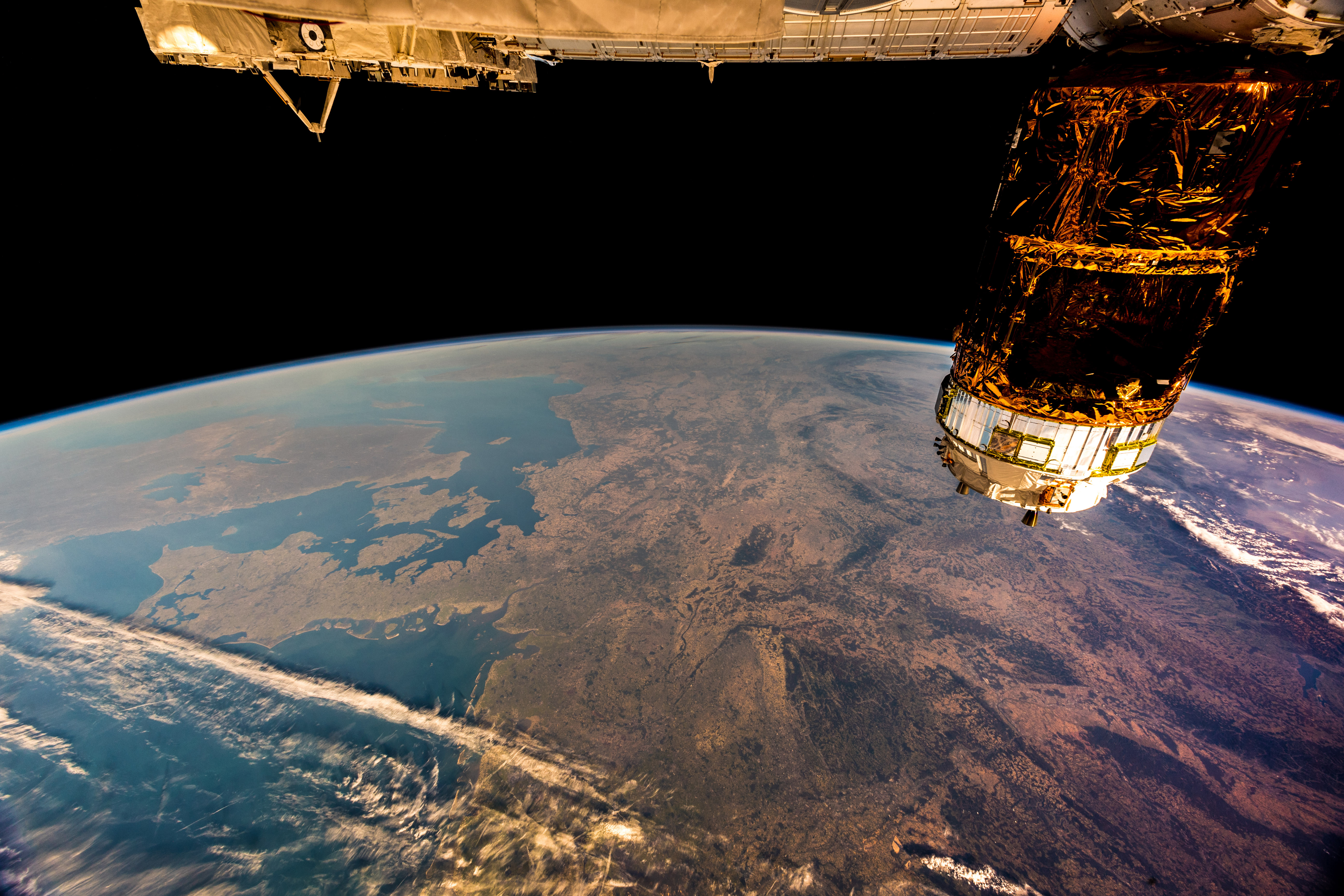
Deforestation in Europe in 2018

Besides their role as a resource for fuel and building material, trees protect the environment by absorbing carbon dioxide and by creating oxygen. The destruction of rain forests is one of the critical causes of climate change. Deforestation causes carbon dioxide to linger in the atmosphere. As carbon dioxide accrues, it produces a layer in the atmosphere that traps radiation from the sun. The radiation converts to heat which causes global warming, which is better known as the greenhouse effect.

Deforestation also affects the water cycle. It reduces the content of water in the soil and groundwater as well as atmospheric moisture. Deforestation reduces soil cohesion, so that erosion, flooding and landslides ensue.

Rain forests house many species and organisms providing people with food and other commodities. In this way biofuels may well be unsustainable if their production contributes to deforestation.

=== Endangered species ===
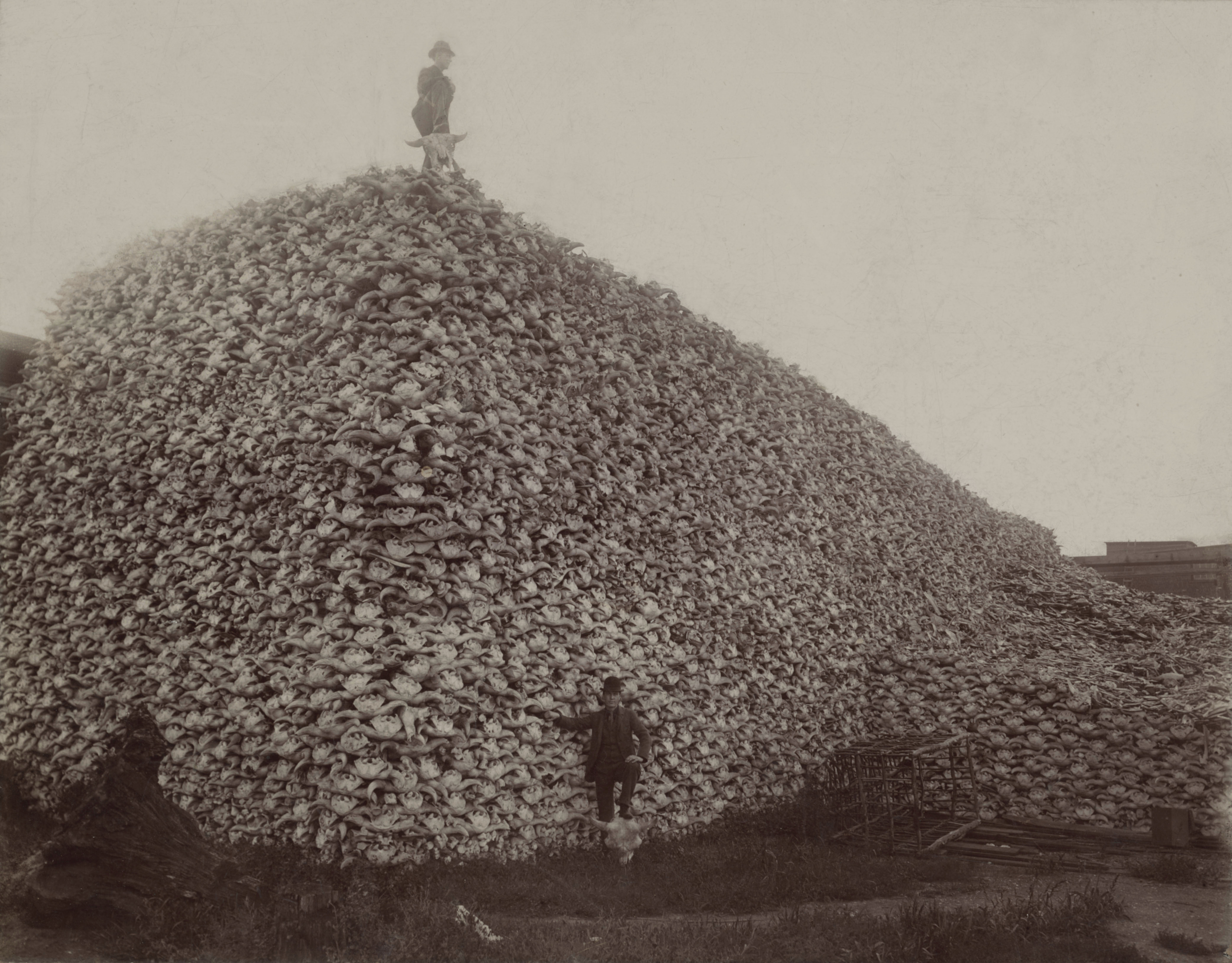
Over-hunting of American bison

Some renewable resources, species and organisms are facing a very high risk of extinction caused by growing human population and over-consumption. It has been estimated that over 40% of all living species on Earth are at risk of going extinct. Many nations have laws to protect hunted species and to restrict the practice of hunting. Other conservation methods include restricting land development or creating preserves. The IUCN Red List of Threatened Species is the best-known worldwide conservation status listing and ranking system. Internationally, 199 countries have signed an accord agreeing to create Biodiversity Action Plans to protect endangered and other threatened species.

== See also ==
- Exploitation of natural resources
- Habitat conservation
- List of renewable resources produced and traded by the United Kingdom
- Natural capital
- Natural resource
- Non-renewable resource
- Recycling
- Resource
- Seed tree
- Stewardship
- Sustainable development
- Scarcity
