= Royal Australian Army Educational Corps =

Administrative corps of the Australian Army

- Badge
- Active: 1949–present
- Country: Australia
- Branch: Australian Army
- Type: Military education

Commanders
- Current commander: Colonel Karina Jones
- Colonel-in-Chief: Birgitte, Duchess of Gloucester

The Royal Australian Army Educational Corps (RAAEC) is a specialist corps within the Australian Army. Formed in 1949, the corps had its genesis in other services that existed within the Australian forces during World War I and World War II. It is currently made up entirely of commissioned officers and is responsible for the provision of education-related services within the Army.

== History ==
The RAAEC was established in September 1949 as the Australian Army Educational Corps and was granted Royal assent in 1960. Consisting of the Crown and a boomerang upon which the corps' initials are inscribed superimposed over a "fluted flambeau of flames", the current RAAEC corps badge was adopted in 1964. It is the only corps badge in the Australian Army where the crown does not appear at the top and is based on the badge devised for the Royal Army Educational Corps by King George VI in 1949.

The corps grew out of the Australian Army Education Service (AAES), which was established on 29 October 1943 during World War II, under the command of Colonel Robert Madgwick. Through the AAES, the corps draws its lineage from the Australian Army Education Scheme, which was established under Madgwick on 5 March 1941. That scheme itself was based loosely upon a vocational education scheme that had been established during World War I within the Australian Imperial Force in 1918 under George Merrick Long, as part of the demobilisation and repatriation process.

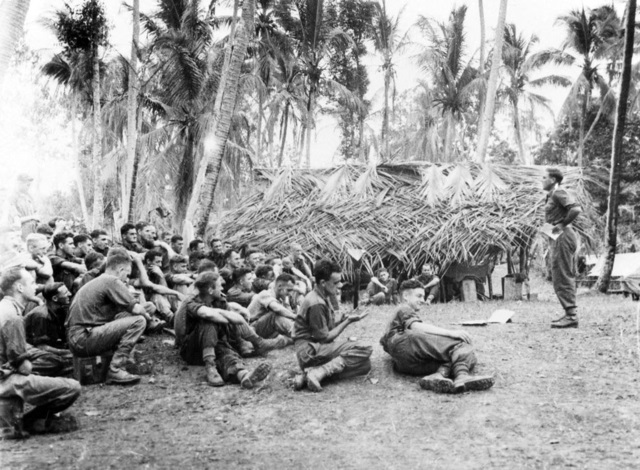
An Australian Education Officer lectures soldiers from the 6th Division, Maprik, July 1945

Throughout its history, the corps has deployed members to support Australian forces deployed on operations. Initially, they deployed to Japan as part of the British Commonwealth Occupation Force, where they provided education support for service personnel and their children. Later, members of the corps were sent to Korea during the Korean War, where they were attached at battalion level to provide soldiers with training in the field. During the Vietnam War, RAAEC personnel were deployed to support the 1st Australian Task Force at Nui Dat.

Throughout its history, the corps has also provided short and long-term courses to enlisted soldiers. In Australia during the 1960s and 1970s, many education courses were provided to soldiers as a requirement for promotion to a higher rank. At the same time, in the (former) Territory of Papua New Guinea, Australian National Servicemen in the education corps provided courses in literacy, numeracy, and citizenship to non-commissioned ranks at various army barracks.

== Current role and structure ==
The RAAEC is responsible for providing educational expertise to optimise learning solutions and systems in Army and the wider Defence environment. This involves applying contemporary theories and practices to enable:

- Instructor development
- Core skills development to increase employability of Defence personnel (includes literacy and numeracy)
- Learning product design, including online learning
- Quality assurance and evaluation of learning solutions, programs and outcomes
- Performance and workforce analysis
- Learning governance (doctrine, policies and procedures)
- Learning technologies and innovations
- International engagement and English language development.

RAAEC Officers are specialist service commissioned officers in a professionally qualified stream that includes lawyers, doctors and other trained professionals. Potential candidates for RAAEC are expected to have an initial teacher education qualification.

RAAEC officers work in all Army Training Centres across Australia and a variety of other Army and Defence organisations, such as the Defence Education, Learning Training Authority and Headquarters Forces Command. RAAEC officers are occasionally deployed on operations to provide training support, and there are some overseas postings available to those with specific skills and Defence experience in teaching English as an Additional Language (EAL).

The current Colonel-in-Chief of the RAAEC is The Duchess of Gloucester. The current Head of the Corps is Colonel Karina Jones.

== Order of precedence ==
Preceded by Royal Australian Electrical and Mechanical Engineers	Australian Army Order of Precedence	Succeeded by Australian Army Public Relations Service
