= One half =

Irreducible fraction

← −0.5	0.5	1.5 →
- −1 0 1 2 3 4 5 6 7 8 9 →: List of numbers; Integers; ← 0 10 20 30 40 50 60 70 80 90 →
- Cardinal: one half
- Ordinal: 1/2th (halfth)
- Binary: 0.1_{2}
- Ternary: 0.1111111111_{3}
- Senary: 0.3_{6}
- Octal: 0.4_{8}
- Duodecimal: 0.6_{12}
- Hexadecimal: 0.8_{16}
- Greek: ∠
- Roman numerals: S
- Egyptian hieroglyph: 𓐛
- Hebrew: חֵצִ
- Malayalam: ൴
- Chinese: 半
- Tibetan: ༪

One half is the multiplicative inverse of 2. It is an irreducible fraction with a numerator of 1 and a denominator of 2. It often appears in mathematical equations, recipes and measurements.

== As a word ==
One half is one of the few fractions which are commonly expressed in natural languages by suppletion rather than regular derivation: the word for "half" in various languages is etymologically unrelated to their word for "two". In English, for example, other small fractions, such as "sixth" and "eleventh", are derived from the corresponding number word.

A half can also be said to be one part of something divided into two equal parts. It is acceptable to write one half as a hyphenated word, one-half.

== Mathematics ==
One half is the rational number that lies midway between 0 and 1 on the number line. Multiplication by one half is equivalent to division by two, or "halving"; conversely, division by one half is equivalent to multiplication by two, or "doubling".

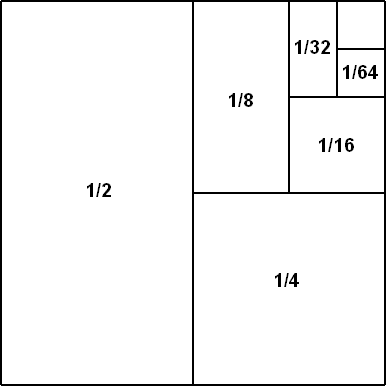
A square of side length one, here dissected into rectangles whose areas are successive powers of one half

A number raised to the power of one half is equal to its square root. This follows from the fact that when multiplying powers, the exponents add. So, $a^{1/2}$ times itself is $a^{1/2 + 1/2}$ which is $a^1$, which equals $a$.

The area of a triangle is one half its base and its height, also known as its altitude.

Fundamental region of the modular j-invariant in the upper half-plane (shaded gray), with modular discriminant $|\tau| \ge 1$ and $-\tfrac{1}{2} < \mathfrak{R}(\tau) \le \tfrac{1}{2}$, where $-\tfrac{1}{2} < \mathfrak{R}(\tau) < 0 \Rightarrow |\tau| > 1$

The gamma function evaluated at one half is the square root of pi.

It has two different decimal representations in base ten, the familiar $0.5$ and the recurring $0.4\overline{9}$, with a similar pair of expansions in any even base; while in odd bases, one half has no terminating representation.

The Bernoulli number $B_{1}$ has the value $\pm \tfrac {1}{2}$ (its sign depending on competing conventions).

The Riemann hypothesis is the conjecture that every nontrivial complex root of the Riemann zeta function has a real part equal to $\tfrac {1}{2}$.

== Computer characters ==
½o

vulgar fraction one half
- In Unicode: U+00BD ½ VULGAR FRACTION ONE HALF

Related
- See also: U+00BC ¼ VULGAR FRACTION ONE QUARTER; U+00BE ¾ VULGAR FRACTION THREE QUARTERS

The "one-half" symbol has its own code point as a precomposed character in the Latin-1 Supplement block of Unicode, rendering as ½.

The reduced size of this symbol may make it illegible to readers with relatively mild visual impairment; consequently the decomposed forms 1/2 or 1/2 may be more appropriate.

== See also ==
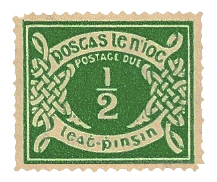
Postal stamp, Ireland, 1940: one halfpenny postage due

- Division by two.
