= Australian Army Public Relations Service =

- Active: 1994–present
- Country: Australia
- Branch: Army
- Type: Corps
- Role: Public Relations
- Motto(s): Defende et Doce (Defend and Inform)

Insignia
- Abbreviation: AAPRS

The Australian Army Public Relations Service (AAPRS) was formed in 1994 from personnel of the Royal Australian Army Educational Corps (Public Relations), a separate corps to RAAEC. Personnel employed in the AAPRS include photographers, reporters and public relations officers.

== Role ==
The service provides public relations support to Australian Defence Force (ADF) operations, exercises and other activities, in Australia and overseas. It is tasked with supporting regional community relations activities through to the production of public relations product, such as video, still photography and text, in areas of operation for release in support of ADF strategic communications objectives.

== Order of precedence ==
Preceded by Royal Australian Army Educational Corps	Australian Army Order of Precedence	Succeeded by Australian Army Catering Corps
