= Robert Madgwick =

Australian educationist (1979-1905)

Sir Robert Madgwick OBE
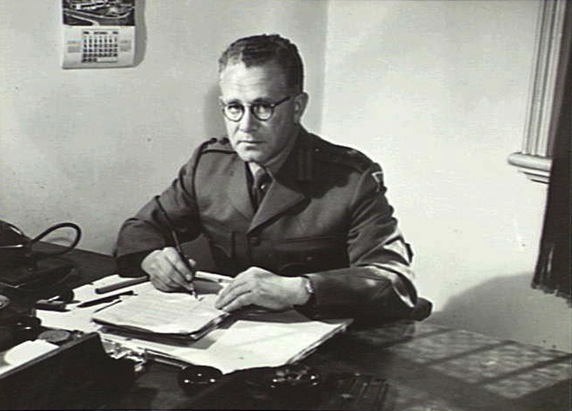
- Colonel Robert Madgwick as Director of Army Education, Melbourne, 1944

Warden of the New England University College
- In office 1946–1953
- Preceded by: Edgar Booth
- Succeeded by: Office abolished

1st Vice-Chancellor of the University of New England
- In office 1954–1966
- Preceded by: Office established
- Succeeded by: Sir Zelman Cowen

Chairman of the Australian Broadcasting Commission
- In office 1967–1973
- Preceded by: James Ralph Darling
- Succeeded by: Richard Downing

Personal details
- Born: Robert Bowden Madgwick; 10 May 1905 North Sydney, New South Wales (NSW)
- Died: 25 March 1979 (aged 73) Hornsby, NSW
- Education: University of Sydney
- Profession: Educationalist

Military service
- Allegiance: Commonwealth of Australia
- Branch/service: Australian Army
- Years of service: 1941–46 (Active duty)
- Rank: Colonel
- Commands: Australian Army Education Service
- Battles/wars: World War II

Sir Robert Bowden Madgwick OBE (10 May 1905 – 25 March 1979) was an Australian educationist. He was the first Vice-Chancellor of the University of New England and served two terms as Chairman of the Australian Broadcasting Commission. Madgwick was an influential proponent of adult learning and extension studies in tertiary education. At the University of New England, he directed the development of several degree programs, including rural science, agricultural economics, and educational administration which were the first of their kind in Australia. In recognition of his contributions to education, Madgwick was appointed to the Order of British Empire in 1962 and knighted in 1966.

Born in North Sydney, New South Wales, Madgwick trained as a schoolteacher before attaining degrees in economics and economic history from the University of Sydney and University of Oxford. Appointed as a lecturer at the University of Sydney, Madgwick worked in the school's extension program which gave him experience and interest in adult education. With the onset of World War II, Madgwick and his colleagues proposed an adult education plan for the Australian Army. The government accepted the plan and, from 1941 to 1946, Madgwick served on active duty as Director of the Australian Army Education Service, which provided adult education services to the Army's 250,000 members during the conflict.

After his release from active duty in 1946, Madgwick was selected as Warden of the New England University College in Armidale, New South Wales. Assuming the position in 1947, Madgwick guided the school, then a college of the University of Sydney, to independence as the University of New England in 1954. Until his retirement in 1966, Madgwick presided over the school's expansion of its curriculum and facilities while promoting closer ties with the local community. Under Madgwick's leadership, the university took an early and leading role in adult education, extension degree programs, and agricultural research. After his retirement, Madgwick served from 1967 to 1973 as Chairman of the Australian Broadcasting Commission.

== Early life and education ==
Madgwick was born on 10 May 1905 in North Sydney, New South Wales, Australia. He was the second of three sons of Australian-born parents Richard Charlton Madgwick and Annie Jane Elston. (Note: Madgwick's older brother, George, became a schoolteacher and headmaster and his younger brother, Richard, became a carpenter.) Madgwick's father was a tram-driver in Sydney and his mother a dressmaker. Both were active members of an Anglican church. Madgwick stated later that his parents taught him that, "all men and women were sacred, and poverty and injustice were in some way contrary to God's teaching." Madgwick described the most important things in his young life as family, church, and school.

Madgwick attended public school in Naremburn and North Sydney Boys High School. After graduating, he entered the University of Sydney in 1923 on a Sydney Teachers College scholarship. Madgwick graduated with a bachelor's degree in economics with first class honours in 1927 and shared the award of the first Sydney University Medal in Economics with (Sir) Hermann Black.

== Teacher and lecturer ==
After receiving his degree, Madgwick obtained employment as a schoolteacher, first at Nowra High School in 1927, then at Parkes High School from 1927 to 1928. He later stated that his short stint as a secondary schoolteacher provided him invaluable experience because it taught, "that all young people are not equal either in ability or motivation, but that each one was a worthy object of my endeavours because each one was interesting in himself and because he had a right to be helped to achieve his potential."

In February 1929, he was appointed to a temporary position as a lecturer in economics at the University of Sydney. In this position, Madgwick participated in the university's adult education (called "tutorial") program, teaching several evening tutorial classes at the main Sydney campus as well as in Bondi and Manly. Madgwick said that this experience in adult education, "was to have a profound influence on my later career and on my attitude to education." In 1931, Madgwick and former classmate (Sir) Ronald Walker published a textbook titled An Outline of Australian Economics. The following year, Madgwick received a master's degree in economics from the University of Sydney. Madgwick's colleagues during this time included H. C. Coombs, who joined the faculty in 1932, Stephen Henry Roberts, and Ian Clunies Ross.

With assistance from economist R.C. Mills, in 1933 Madgwick was awarded a Rockefeller Foundation Fellowship. Beginning that year, he attended Balliol College, Oxford, returning to Australia in 1935. In 1936 Oxford accorded Madgwick a doctor of philosophy. His thesis, published in London in 1937, was titled Immigration into Eastern Australia 1788–1851 and was one of the few scholarly works on Australian history to appear in print before World War II.

In 1936 Madgwick was a visiting Harbison-Higginbotham Scholar at the University of Melbourne. The same year, Madgwick took an appointment as a senior lecturer in economic history at the University of Sydney. (Note: Spaull and Ryan differ on the month that Madgwick began the appointment. Spaull says it was January; Ryan says it was March 1936.) In this capacity, Madgwick frequently worked with the university's department of tutorial classes and helped found the Sydney University Lecturers' Association. In 1937, he accepted appointment as Secretary of the Sydney University Extension Board (SUEB), which focused on adult education in surrounding communities, including lectures, tutorial classes, and study circles. Madgwick held the position until 1940, often travelling to rural communities in the Northern Rivers and New England areas of New South Wales to present lectures. Many of the lectures took place at the New England University College (later to become the University of New England) campus in Armidale.

Madgwick disapproved of the SUEB's approach to its education program, finding it too rigid and conservative to appeal to a community of people with many different backgrounds and goals. Madgwick felt it was better to provide adults the education that they wanted, not what the university thought "they needed or should have." He described his goal as "genuine liberal adult education." Based on his observations, Madgwick, as secretary of the program, helped implement a plan to redevelop the university's adult education program. The changes included following-up tutorial classes with extension lectures, widening the SUEB board membership, developing contacts to involve the local business community with the program, and more lectures on international affairs. Later, Madgwick explained more on his thoughts on adult education, saying,

If adult education were to succeed it must start by finding out what people were interested in, and then starting out to satisfy their interests. There is nothing at all wrong about this, providing adequate standards are maintained in both the lectures and the subject matter, for it can be established easily enough that the satisfaction of one interest or felt need will inevitably produce others, and the educational process continues.

In 1938, as a member of the Australian Institute of International Affairs Madgwick attended the British Commonwealth Relations Conference in Lapstone, New South Wales. From 1931 to 1940 he participated in the Round Table movement.

Madgwick married Ailsa Margaret Aspinall, daughter of H. J. Aspinall, at St Stephen's Presbyterian Church in Sydney on 19 May 1937. The marriage produced three daughters. Margaret Ann was born in March 1938, Ailsa Mary in June 1940, and Helen Millicent was born in June 1943.

== Army Education Service ==
From September 1939 to March 1940, Madgwick designed and managed an adult education scheme for the Sydney University Regiment, commanded by Victor Windeyer, based at Menangle. As Australia in 1940 became increasingly involved in World War II and expanded its military forces, Madgwick and colleagues David Drummond, C.E.W. Bean, (Sir) Robert W. Wallace (Vice-Chancellor of the University of Sydney), Richard Charles Mills, W. G. K. Duncan, Alf A.J. Conlon, and others began to publicly call for the Australian Army to install an adult education program to combat illiteracy among its members and educate them in the political history of Australia. Beginning in May 1940 and culminating in a special conference on 20 August 1940, Madgwick and the others cooperatively drafted an adult education scheme for the Army.

Early in November 1940, Army Minister Percy Spender solicited ideas from Australia's universities for an adult education program for the Army and suggestions on who should lead the program. In response, the University of Sydney submitted and recommended the plan prepared by Madgwick and his colleagues. The Army accepted the plan and on 1 March 1941 the Army Education Service (AES) was established. Madgwick was selected as its commander, titled "Assistant Adjutant General (Education)", and commissioned with the temporary rank of lieutenant colonel. The plan was given final approval by the Australian War Cabinet in May 1941. As implemented, the program covered the 250,000 Army troops stationed in Australia and Australian territories or protectorates in the East Asia/South Pacific area. The goals of the program included improving morale, fostering civic responsibility, providing diversion from the tedium of military life, and preparing servicemen and women to enter the workforce after demobilisation. At least initially, the program consisted of extension lectures, tutorial classes, and discussion groups.

"Education should be an adventure, something that we undertake because it is interesting as well as instructive. Democracy cannot survive if decisions are to be made by the people and the people do not understand what they are asked to decide. To me the success of our scheme will be measured by the number of men who become more tolerant of the other man's opinion."
Robert Madgwick, editorial in the first issue of Salt, 29 September 1941

Based at the Army's headquarters in Melbourne, the AES started out with 43 assigned personnel, 14 officers and 29 non-commissioned officers and typists, but expanded as the war progressed. By 1944 the unit comprised 963 staff, including instructors, teachers, and administrators and had established offices down to the regimental level. Each brigade usually contained an AES officer and a sergeant who maintained a library, gave lectures on current affairs, supervised correspondence courses, wrote newsletters, and ensured that Salt and Current Affairs Bulletin were distributed. Each Army base usually also had a larger reference library. In 1943 the AES established two schools, one in Western Australia and the other in New South Wales, to provide education in basic education skills to illiterate Army recruits.

In its first year, the AES counted 1 million attendees at its lectures and classes held throughout Australia and vicinity. By the end of the war, 10 million had attended its classes and 64,000 had enrolled in correspondence courses. The AES staff had given 150,000 lectures, presented 31,000 recitals, and shown 3,200 films. Libraries established by the service held 750,000 books. Circulation of the service's journal, Salt, reached 250,000. The service also published a second periodical, the Current Affairs Bulletin, which was distributed to officers for use as a source for lectures on current affairs. Beginning in June 1943, Salt was often censored by the Army's Director-General of Public Relations for ideas "damaging to morale", content of "questionable taste", and information which might affect security.

Madgwick travelled extensively supporting the AES's efforts, especially in the Northern Territory and New Guinea. He also contributed a series of articles and editorials to Salt. In July 1943, he was promoted to temporary colonel and given the title of Director of Army Education.

The AES had its share of detractors who accused Madgwick and the service of attempting to politicise the Army's membership and harbouring left-wing, "subversive" instructors. Robert Menzies criticised the AES leadership of being biased towards the Australian Labor Party. Madgwick denied the allegations, asserting that the service's goal was, "education, not propaganda."

Beginning in 1943, Madgwick participated in government educational planning for the post-war years. He played a major role in the establishment of the Commonwealth Reconstruction Training Scheme to provide government assistance to ex-servicemembers to complete or undertake university education. In 1944 Madgwick and colleagues began drafting their vision for post-war adult education and articulated their vision at the Workers Education Association of New South Wales Conference, held 10–11 March 1944 in Sydney. They followed-up the conference with a formal, published paper, which called for heavy Commonwealth government involvement and expenditures on adult education. Their proposed plan, however, was rejected by the Prime Minister's office, which, to Madgwick's disappointment selected a more modest program drafted by W.G.K. Duncan, which Madgwick then implemented in part at the University of New England in 1948. Madgwick's active duty service ended in March 1946 and he was transferred to reserve officer status on 19 April 1946. (Note: Madgwick was placed on the Army's retired list in 1961. Until his retirement, he was designated with the official title of "Colonel Commandant of the Royal Australian Education Corps")

Upon his release from active duty, Madgwick spent the rest of 1946 as Executive Officer for the Commonwealth Inter-Departmental Committee on Education in Canberra. In this role, he helped plan and establish the Australian National University, acting as secretary on the new university's interim council. At the same time he served as Secretary to the first Commonwealth Committee which allocated federal funds to universities for research. Madgwick later explained that these experiences at the federal government level influenced his belief that adult education programs should be decentralised to the state level. He helped keep the AES's journal Current Affairs Bulletin alive by persuading the Commonwealth Office of Education to take over management of the journal and added that the experience with Australian National University helped him in later establishing the University of New England as an independent school.

== University of New England ==
=== Independence ===
After Edgar Booth resigned as Warden of New England University College in Armidale on 1 July 1945, Madgwick was selected by the University of Sydney in December 1946 to replace acting Warden James Belshaw. Madgwick then assumed the office on 17 February 1947

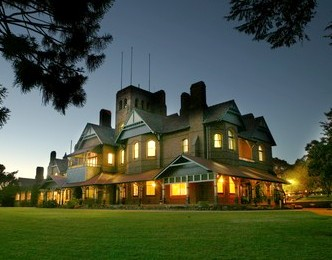
Booloominbah, original facility of the University of New England, as seen in 2009

New England University College, established in 1938 under the University of Sydney, was still a small, fledgling institution. At the time of Madgwick's appointment, the college had 202 full-time students, two faculties – arts and science – and no professors, only lecturers. Most of the school's activities and facilities were contained in a single building- Booloominbah. The New South Wales State Government Act, which created the college, stipulated that it would become independent as soon as it was considered ready. (Note: Enrolment in the college reached almost 250 students in 1948 and remained at this number until 1956) The school, however, had made little progress towards official autonomy. A formal request for funding and support to go independent submitted to the state by the school in September 1944 had gone unanswered. In May 1945, the University of Sydney Senate mandated that the college be emancipated within seven years, but had thereafter taken no further action to ensure that its order was accomplished. Among Madgwick's most pressing concerns upon assuming the office of warden was to resolve the question of independence for the school. (Note: In the late 1940s, Madgwick supervised upgrades to the school's facilities and expansion of its faculties and staff. A temporary laboratory building, five temporary dormitories, and a new dining room and kitchen were completed in 1949. Fourteen full-time lecturers were hired.)

In response to the post–World War II baby boom, the New South Wales Department of Education, under Bob Heffron, queried the University of Sydney in 1951 on its thoughts about training and certifying schoolteachers by external studies and/or correspondence courses. The university rejected the idea, stating that external degree or certification programs would be significantly inferior to residence education. Undeterred, Heffron asked New England about its willingness to conduct external studies. Madgwick enthusiastically supported the idea and instructed his college's staff to begin preparing an external studies program. Heffron asked the University of Sydney if it had any objection to New England being granted independence to operate the state's external education program. The university replied that it had no objection.

Heffron introduced the University of New England Act to the state parliament in early December 1953. The governor signed the act into law on 16 December 1953 and the college became the independent University of New England on 1 February 1954. Madgwick assumed the office of first Vice-Chancellor. (Note: Before the act was passed, there was some controversy over the external studies plan when the state opposition party learned that New England would not be prepared to begin its extension program until 1955. As a compromise, the University of Technology, Sydney's Newcastle college agreed to begin external instruction in 1954 under New England's supervision.)

=== Curriculum expansion ===
Among Madgwick's priorities, in addition to the mandated extension program, was the expansion of the university's curriculum while orienting it to meet the needs and culture of the New England community. As the first Australian university located in a rural area, Madgwick focused the university's development in the areas of adult education, agriculture, and ranching. These programs would help define the new university.

==== Extension ====
The primary goal of the planned University of New England extension program was to provide opportunities for people to obtain a university degree who could not easily travel to attend lectures, often because they lived in rural areas. At this time, most Australian universities were opposed to external degree programs because, among other reasons, they considered that they diluted academic standards and provided a sub-standard education. Madgwick felt that these potential issues could be overcome by careful administration and appropriate financial support from the government. In setting up the program, Madgwick directed that the program's instructors also participate in internal education and should be considered on a par with their internal colleagues. The examinations given to external students would be the same as those given to internal attendees. External students were required to attend some residential courses as part of their degree programs.

Classes in the program began in 1955. The program's long-time director, Howard Sheath, beginning in March 1956, instituted several innovations to the program which proved popular with external students. These included sending lecturers to rural communities to give weekend seminars and establishing University Centres throughout New South Wales for students to assemble for lectures and discussion groups, and take examinations.

350 students enrolled in the program in its first year, 746 were enrolled in 1957, and 1,512 in 1960. By 1965 there were 2,500 external students and they outnumbered the university's internal students by more than two to one. Eighty to ninety percent of the external students were schoolteachers. Between 1955 and 1964, the average graduation rate for external students was 78%.

==== Adult education ====
While at New England, Madgwick continued his strong support for adult education (AE). The main differences between AE and external studies were that AE focused on classroom courses and the classes were not usually part of a degree program. In 1948, Madgwick secured a government grant to expand the school's adult education program. In June of that year, Arnold Walter Eberle was appointed adult education officer, officially Senior Staff Tutor, Department of Tutorial Services, University of Sydney, for the college, a position he held until his death in 1954. Eberle, with Madgwick's support, selected courses based on feedback from the local populace as to what they wanted to study, rather than adhering to the University of Sydney's established curriculum. The program, the first adult program based outside of Australia's capital cities, focused on functional, practical courses rather than formal, abstract, and theoretical instruction. As a result, "effective" enrolments (students who completed the class) in 1948 for New England adult courses were 88.8% compared with 66% for metropolitan Sydney adult classes. By 1949, 4% of the population of the New England area had attended one of the college's classes.

A. J. A. Nelson, who succeeded Eberle as director of the adult education program, recalled in 1987 the conversation he had with Madgwick when Nelson arrived at the university in 1955. Said Madgwick to Nelson, "I see your job as the most important in the University. It is the one I would like to have if I were not Vice-Chancellor. The future of the whole University will depend on how well you do it."

There was a major cash infusion into the AE program in 1958 as a result of large government grants. Over time, the university continued to provide classes and educational activities in topics popular with the local community, including arts, crafts, agricultural topics, animal husbandry, and local history. In 1958, for example, two AE-sponsored travelling expositions on Australian artists and Aboriginal culture were viewed by an estimated 12,000 people in the New England area. The success of the program helped further Madgwick's goal of providing tertiary education opportunities to enrich the lives of the local populace.

In 1964, Peter Wright, chairman of a local development association, said of the effect of the university's AE classes in agricultural and related education on the New England area, "In the short time the University of New England has been here it has achieved a tremendous amount [in increasing local prosperity and stopping the drift to the cities] ... It has boosted the morale of the Tablelands. People have come to realise that the expertise and knowledge of the university can be used for the benefit of the surrounding area."

==== Rural science ====
As the college prepared for independence in 1953, Madgwick and his staff discussed establishing a farm-related degree program distinctive from the veterinary science degree offered at the University of Sydney. Madgwick journeyed to England and the United States to consult with agriculturalists, veterinarians, and specialists in animal husbandry. While Madgwick was gone, his deputy warden, James Belshaw, read a letter in the Australian Veterinary Journal from Gordon McClymont, a researcher in animal nutrition for the New South Wales Department of Agriculture, which advocated the establishment of a multi-disciplinary approach to farm science combining animal husbandry and agronomy.

With approval from the college, Belshaw asked McClymont to prepare a paper explaining his ideas on the topic. His paper, submitted later that year, was titled, "Planning Rural Science and Possible Curriculum". In the paper, McClymont, as his title indicated, suggested that the name for the prospective faculty should be "rural science." Madgwick reviewed McClymont's paper when he returned to Armidale in February 1954. Convinced by McClymont's reasoning, Madgwick recommended to the university council the establishment of the faculty. On 16 October 1954 the college offered McClymont the position of chair of the soon-to-be established Faculty of Rural Science.

The faculty, under which classes began in March 1956, was the first of its kind in Australian higher education and became one of New England's signature programs. Under McClymont's leadership the university became a prominent international centre in ruminant research.

==== Agricultural economics ====
Agricultural economics was another discipline in which Madgwick hoped to differentiate New England, as no other university in Australia offered such a degree. Madgwick also felt that the program would be applicable to issues facing the New England community. Said Madgwick of the proposed program, "The reputation of the university may well depend on the success it achieves in finding solutions to problems of primary production as they affect this region."

The proposed degree would consist of courses not only in agricultural economics, but also agriculture, land economics, farm management, rural sociology, statistics, mathematics, economic history, and economic policy. After a delay spent obtaining funding for the new program, the faculty was established and began instruction in March 1958. Between 1960 and 1985, 450 students graduated from the program. In 1980, the Commonwealth government named New England as a Key Centre for Advanced Training in Agricultural Economics. (Note: In 1970 the faculty merged with the Faculty of Economics. One of the graduates, Geoff Miller, became director of the Australian Bureau of Agricultural and Resource Economics in the late 1970s.)

=== Additional expansion and activities ===
The university established the Department of Education in 1959, under the Faculty of Arts, which awarded degrees in Educational Administration. The diploma combined teaching, research, development, professional experience, and service and was the first degree of its kind in Australia. So many students from all across Australia applied for the program that a quota had to be instituted. In 1984 the program was considered the largest and best known postgraduate educational administration program in Australia. (Note: The department became the Faculty of Education in 1969 with masters and doctoral programs.)

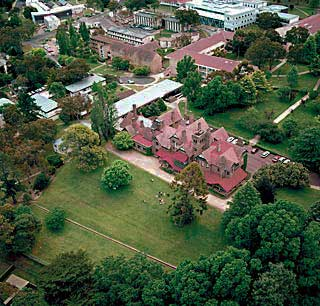
Aerial view of the University of New England in 2006. Several of the buildings in the upper portion of the photograph were constructed under Madgwick's administration in the early 1960s.

Between 1954 and 1960, the student body at New England more than doubled to over 500 students with a corresponding increase in staff and faculty, forcing the school to erect temporary, weatherboard huts to accommodate its expanded facilities and classrooms. In 1958, the university received £900,000 in government grants for facilities improvements and Madgwick presided over the planning and construction of over ten permanent buildings on the main campus, some of which were completed after Madgwick retired in 1966. (Note: The grant was the result of the Murray Committee's, led by Keith Murray, Baron Murray of Newhaven, report in 1957 which advised the Australian central government to greatly increase its spending and involvement with the nation's tertiary education system. The committee's work resulted in the Australian Universities Grants Committee, under the office of the Prime Minister, which from 1959 greatly increased the number and amounts of government grants provided to Australia's universities. See Ryan (2008), p. 114 for a complete list of major construction projects begun under Madgwick's direction.)

Throughout Madgwick's tenure with the university, he promoted closer ties between the school and the Armidale community by participating in committees and activities with local organisations. At varying times he served as president of the local branches of Legacy and Rotary, vice-president of the Rugby Union Club and New England Association, and member or patron of the Armidale High School Parent's and Citizen's Association, Armidale Demonstration School Parent's and Citizen's Association, Boy Scouts, Council of the New England Girls' School, Council of The Armidale School, Council of Armidale High School, the Anglican Diocese of Armidale, the New England Cricket Association, and the Australian Broadcasting Commission's Tamworth Advisory Committee. Madgwick also made numerous public appearances, speaking at or attending university matriculation ceremonies, university services held at cathedrals in Armidale, annual commemoration of benefactors ceremonies, bestowals of honorary degrees on local figures, and Albert Joseph Memorial orations. From 1954 to 1959 he served as an alderman on the Armidale city council.

Madgwick frequently reached-out to the broader university and northern New South Wales region by giving speeches on local radio stations and submitting a series of articles and reports to the university newsletter UNE Bulletin. In September 1956 Madgwick visited communities along the Clarence River which were experiencing difficulties with agricultural economic downturns, damaging floods, and population erosion, and promised, "the full force of the University" to assist in the region's community development.

In 1961, Madgwick was elected first president of the Australian Association of Adult Education. That same year, he received honorary doctorates from the Universities of Sydney and Queensland.

Madgwick was frequently absent from his official duties from 1963 to 1966 due to ill health. Nevertheless, from 1964 to 1966, he served as chairman of the Australian Vice-Chancellors' Committee. In this capacity, he successfully fended off a decision from the Australian Universities Commission, headed by Leslie H. Martin, that distance (extension) education should not be a university function. Internal student enrolment had increased to 1396 in 1965, a year before Madgwick's retirement. The academic staff had grown from 65 in 1953 to 360 in 1966 and the general staff had increased from 100 in 1954 to 693 in 1966. Research expenditures in 1954 had amounted to £5,286. In 1965 £180,834 was spent on research with £51,328 coming from university funds and the rest from other sources.

In recognition of his contributions to education and community improvement, Madgwick was bestowed the honour of Knight Bachelor on 1 January 1966. He retired from the University of New England in December 1966. Armidale presented Madgwick with its Freedom of the City in 1966, named an approach road to the university as "Madgwick Drive" in August 1971, and in 2003 designated the postal code for a western portion of the city as "Madgwick 2350."

== Australian Broadcasting Commission ==
=== Appointment and management style ===
In retirement, Madgwick moved to Canberra and worked as a consultant for John Gorton, Minister of Education, advising on grants to teachers colleges. He also continued as a Fellow of the Australian College of Educators, council member of Australian National University, a member of the Development Corporation of New South Wales, member of the University Club in Sydney, chaired the New South Wales Advisory Committee on Cultural Grants from 1968 to 1975, and acted as Director of Longmans (Australia), Pty., Ltd.

In May 1967, Madgwick was chosen to replace James Darling as chairman of the Australian Broadcasting Commission (ABC). Darling learned that Harold Holt's government intended to replace him in an article in The Age. According to insiders, Holt's government was unhappy with the ABC's current events shows which appeared to take a contrary position on their policies. Madgwick was chosen as Darling's replacement, reportedly because he was considered unidentified with any political party and was widely respected. Gorton approached Madgwick in late May 1967, offered him the position, and gave him one day to reply to the offer. Madgwick asked the advice of Louis Matheson and Philip Baxter of the Vice-Chancellor's Committee. Then, he checked with his daughter Mary, who worked in the ABC's education department, if she would be "embarrassed" to have her father as chairman. The next day Madgwick informed Gorton and Alan Hulme, the Postmaster-General who governed the ABC, that he would accept the position.

Madgwick officially took office on 1 July 1967. As chairman, Madgwick took a somewhat hands-off approach to directing the organisation, preferring to provide his opinion as to how things should operate, then deferring to his administrators to decide what to do. Madgwick considered his position as similar to a university president, with managers and producers equivalent to professors and researchers. He bought a home in Mosman to be closer to the ABC's main Broadcast House in Sydney. Madgwick tried to make himself available by walking around the offices and facilities and amiably conversing with all ABC employees. He was subsequently described as the most popular chairman in the history of the organisation. Madgwick was given a second term as chairman in 1970.

=== Issues addressed ===
Madgwick was usually on good terms with Hulme, although like with Darling they sometimes disagreed on the content of ABC's current affairs shows, especially This Day Tonight (TDT). Hulme frequently passed-on complaints of bias in TDT's coverage from Holt's government in Canberra, each of which Madgwick dutifully investigated. Said Madgwick, "On no occasion did I find that the programme had been consciously biased one way or another."

On 13 May 1970, Hulme sent Madgwick a letter saying that he (Hulme) would, for the 1970–71 budget, be asking the Treasurer to cut ABC's budget by $500,000 and that at least half that cut would be applied to current affairs programming. The letter caused anger and consternation among the ABC's administrators, who felt that the threat undermined the ABC's independence and authority to decide its own programming. Because Madgwick was temporarily unavailable due to illness, ABC's board of commissioners met with Hulme to protest his intentions. The contents of the letter were leaked by someone in the ABC and received widespread coverage throughout Australia's media. On 27 May 1970, Hulme retracted the letter. That same day, Madgwick and his administrators drafted a letter in response, saying that Hulme's proposal would have been "completely unacceptable" to the ABC. Madgwick followed it up that evening by giving an interview on ABC's 7 o'clock news in which he explained his views on the proper relation between the government and the ABC.

One of Madgwick's primary responsibilities as chairman was to answer questions and inquiries from the Commonwealth government and its committees. In 1968 the Joint Parliamentary Committee of Public Accounts investigated the ABC's finances. In late 1971, the Estimates Committee investigated a concern about ABC employees sometimes refusing to disclose internal ABC information to government overseers. In August 1971 the Senate Standing Committees on Education, Science and the Arts conducted a general inquiry into radio and television. On every occasion, Madgwick, accompanied by ABC general manager Talbot Duckmanton, travelled to Canberra to answer each committee's questions. Under Madgwick, the ABC's annual budget grew from $50 million in 1969 to $90 million in 1973.

On 2 December 1972, Holt's government was voted out as the Labor Party took the majority in Canberra. The new prime minister was Gough Whitlam and new postmaster-general was Doug McClelland. In early 1973, in an effort to foster a more independent organisation, Madgwick asked Whitlam if the ABC's employees could be removed from the Public Service Board, which administered the Commonwealth government employment system. Although Whitlam had supported the idea in the past, he now opposed it as prime minister and did not act on Madgwick's request.

Madgwick's second term as chairman expired on 30 June 1973 and he hoped to be extended for a third. McClelland, however, told Madgwick in early 1973 that Whitlam was concerned about Madgwick's age and therefore planned to replace him. Privately, Madgwick felt that Whitlam wanted him replaced because Whitlam suspected Madgwick and his vice-chairman of being biased in favour of the previous government. Madgwick, as with Darling, was not officially informed that would be replaced as chairman until shortly before his term expired. The new chairman was Richard Downing, Assistant Vice-Chancellor of the University of Melbourne and a Labor supporter.

== Other work, memberships, and family life ==
After leaving the ABC, from 1974 to 1976, Madgwick chaired the Australian Frontier Commission. He was a member of the Killara Golf Club, Commonwealth Club of Canberra, and the University Club of Sydney.

Early in Madgwick's first term as chairman of the ABC, on 26 October 1967, Madgwick's wife died in Canberra. Madgwick married widow Eileen Hilda McGrath, née Wall at St Andrew's Anglican Church, Wahroonga on 12 January 1971. (Note: Foster, p. 223 gives her name as Nance McGrath.) He established his main residence in St Ives.

== Death ==
Madgwick died on 25 March 1979 at Hornsby, New South Wales, and was cremated. He was survived by his wife and three daughters from his first marriage.

Lady Madgwick died in 2004.

== Awards and honours ==
- 1927 University of Sydney Medal in Economics
- 1933 Rockefeller Foundation Fellowship
- 1936 Harbison-Higginbotham Scholarship
- 1961 Doctor of Letters, University of Sydney
- 1961 Doctor of Laws, Honoris Causa, University of Queensland
- 1962 Officer of the Order of the British Empire
- 1966 Knight Bachelor
- 1966 Freedom of the City of Armidale, New South Wales
- 1969 Doctor of Letters, University of New England

== Selected publications ==
- Walker, E. Ronald; R. B. Madgwick (1953) [1931]. An Outline of Australian Economics. Sydney: Whitcombe and Tombs Ltd. p. 317. ISBN 9780424059105. OCLC 254879979.
- Madgwick, Robert Bowden (1969) [1937]. Immigration into Eastern Australia, 1788–1851. Sydney: Sydney University Press. p. 270. ISBN 978-0-424-05910-5. OCLC 152484540.

== Notes ==
Military offices
New title Corps raised	Commander of the Australian Army Education Service; 1941–1945	Unknown
Academic offices
Preceded by Edgar Booth	Warden of the New England University College; 1946–1953	Office abolished
New title University established	Vice-Chancellor of the University of New England; 1954–1966	Succeeded by Sir Zelman Cowen
Media offices
Preceded by Sir James Darling	Chairman of the Australian Broadcasting Commission; 1967–1973	Succeeded by Richard Downing
