= Threequarters =

Threequarters may refer to several playing positions in the sport of rugby:

- Threequarters (rugby league)
- Three-quarters (rugby union)

== See also ==
- The fraction (mathematics) 3/4 (three quarters)
