= Gordon McClymont =

Australian agricultural scientist

- Born: Gordon Lee McClymont; 8 May 1920
- Died: 6 May 2000 (aged 79); Sydney, Australia
- Other name: Bill
- Education: Bachelor of Veterinary Science (1941); Doctor of Philosophy (1949)
- Alma mater: University of Sydney; University of Cambridge
- Occupations: Agricultural scientist, ecologist, and educationist
- Organization: University of New England (UNE)
- Known for: Foundation Dean of the Faculty of Rural Science, UNE; Originated the term "sustainable agriculture"
- Awards: University of Sydney Medal; Australian Poultry Award; Order of Australia; Honorary Doctor of Rural Science, UNE

Gordon Lee McClymont AO (8 May 1920 – 6 May 2000) was an Australian agricultural scientist, ecologist, and educationist. The originator of the term "sustainable agriculture", McClymont is known for his multidisciplinary approach to farm ecology. McClymont was the foundation chair of the Faculty of Rural Science at the University of New England, the first degree program of its kind to integrate animal husbandry, veterinary science, agronomy, and other disciplines into the field of livestock and agricultural production. In 1978, in recognition of his work and contributions to his field, he was appointed Officer of the Order of Australia.

Born in Australia, McClymont entered the University of Sydney under the sponsorship of the New South Wales Department of Agriculture. After graduating with a bachelor's degree in veterinary science from Sydney and a PhD from the University of Cambridge, he worked as an animal nutrition researcher for the state of New South Wales. Believing that his education had not adequately prepared him for his work, McClymont designed a broader, multi-disciplinary educational approach to the field of livestock and agricultural production. Impressed with his ideas, the University of New England hired McClymont in 1955 to chair its new department of rural science.

While at the university, McClymont championed his approach to farm and livestock production and sustainability of agricultural ecosystems. Under his direction, the University of New England became a leader in ruminant research. The Australian poultry industry recognized McClymont's contributions to poultry production with a special award in 1967. After his retirement in 1980, McClymont continued to work with the agricultural industry in Australia and consulted with the United Nations and the World Bank on farm issues. In 1996, he expounded his approach to livestock and farm production in the book Rural Science: Philosophy and Application.

== Early life and undergraduate education ==
McClymont was born on 8 May 1920. His father was one of seven sons of a Scottish immigrant to Australia. McClymont's father greeted him as a newborn with, "G'day Bill" and Bill stuck with him as a nickname for the rest of his life. McClymont's father's brothers resided in rural areas, including in the Orange, New South Wales, region. Thus, although McClymont grew up in the Sydney metropolitan area, he spent much holiday time as a youth in a rural environment. His activities at his relatives' farms included lamb marking, fruit picking, horse breaking, and pig shooting. McClymont also became familiar with the local animals and plants.

McClymont attended Chatswood Intermediate High School, where he became interested in science. In his fourth year, he transferred to North Sydney Boys High School. In his Leaving Certificate Exam, taken in 1936, McClymont earned First Class Honours in physics and chemistry, which placed him third and fourth respectively on the New South Wales state honours list. While in high school, he participated in the Australian Army Cadets in a horse-drawn field artillery unit.

Lacking funds to attend university, a family friend who worked for the New South Wales Department of Agriculture suggested that McClymont apply for a department traineeship. In spite of his lack of formal agricultural training, McClymont passed the exam and interview and was assigned to the University of Sydney's veterinary science program. Provided with a salary of £110 a year, he entered the university in 1937.

When World War II began in 1939, McClymont joined the Australian Army Veterinary Corps in the 2nd Cavalry Mobile Veterinary Section assigned to his university. His unit volunteered for overseas duty, but was refused. McClymont joined the Royal Australian Air Force as an aircrew reservist, but was again denied an overseas assignment and ordered to complete his education at Sydney while serving the military in a scientific advisory role. He joined the Volunteer Defence Corps at the rank of sergeant and served weekend duty during the war years at anti-aircraft and radar installations in Australia.

Because of the war, McClymont's final two years of undergraduate study were compressed into 16 months. He graduated in 1941 with a bachelor of veterinary science, First Class Honours, and a gold university medal.

== New South Wales Department of Agriculture ==
=== Early career ===
Immediately after graduation in 1941, McClymont was appointed as a specialist in animal nutrition at the New South Wales Department of Agriculture. In that position, he was responsible for all extension, advisory work, and policy advice on animal nutrition for the state government. In one instance during the war, McClymont had to respond to a swine influenza outbreak caused by pig meat imported by American troops stationed in Australia. While participating in an operation to kill and burn potentially infected suidae in a local piggery, he met his future wife, Vivienne Pecover, sister of the farmer whose pigs were being slaughtered. The two married in 1946.

From 1947 to 1949, under a Walter and Eliza Hall Veterinary Research Fellowship, he attended the University of Cambridge from which he earned a doctor of philosophy. His thesis, called Interrelationships between the digestive and mammary physiology of ruminants, was based on research he had conducted in 1947 in which he discovered that green oat consumption by dairy cows produced milk with less butterfat. In the thesis, he explained how the complex interaction between environment, climate, soil, plant, and animal physiology and metabolism had combined to produce the lowered milkfat.

After completion of his term at Cambridge, McClymont toured agricultural research centres and colleges in the United States. While in the US, he gave 15 lectures on his doctoral research. A number of American agricultural scientists told him later that his lectures had caused them to change their fields of research. McClymont was not impressed by the agricultural education he observed in Britain or the US, saying that the British focused on estate management while the Americans concentrated on descriptive evaluations of livestock quality.

Upon his return to Australia in 1950, McClymont was reassigned as Officer in Charge of the department's Animal Nutrition Research Laboratory at Glenfield Veterinary Research Station. At Glenfield, he developed research programs on drought feeding and pregnancy toxaemia in sheep and established a nutritional diagnostic service.

Between 1945 and 1953, McClymont participated in adult education activities to rural areas around New South Wales for the Sydney University Extension Board and New England University College. New England University College was an extension college of the University of Sydney located in Armidale, New South Wales. The activities included holding seminars on animal husbandry and agriculture for farmers and graziers. From 1951 to 1953, McClymont helped New England University College establish facilities and adult classes in animal husbandry and agricultural economics in Walcha, Tamworth, Moree, and Dubbo.

=== Ideas on education ===
McClymont's work experiences caused him to feel dissatisfied with the quality of education he had received in his degree program at Sydney. He felt the veterinary science specialization was too narrow, especially in the area of animal husbandry and livestock production. Moreover, he felt the specialization of the discipline did not provide sufficient knowledge in how the overall farm animal production process worked. For example, as an undergraduate, he received only three lectures on statistics, a skill he had to teach himself during his first few years as an animal nutritionist advisor. As a result, he took an interest in education and curriculum development. McClymont later said that he had "seen the educational deficiencies of narrow specialization, whether of veterinary graduates as specialists in animal health and disease or of agricultural science graduates as specialists in aspects of soil and plants. I had seen the problems created by such specialized knowledge when exercised without overall understanding."

In June 1952, two lecturers in veterinary science at the University of Sydney, Doug Blood and Jim Steel, wrote a letter to the Australian Veterinary Journal complaining of their university's placement of animal husbandry as a subordinate topic within veterinary science. They argued that the field of animal husbandry included "the procurement of maximum production from the available animals, compatible with their continued health and the maintenance of the natural resources of the land on which they live" and was worthy of its own profession. McClymont saw the letter and responded with his own missive to the journal in June 1953. In his letter, McClymont opined that the field in question should instead be called "animal production" and that it should, "be defined as the integration of animal husbandry and agronomy (the science of pasture and crop production), or in more general terms, manipulation of the soil-plant-animal complex, for the purpose of economic production of animal products". He added that the university-level training in the field should include, "extension work, research, and commercial applications". McClymont concluded that university graduates in such a field of study would be prepared to blend veterinary (animal) and agricultural (plant) production sciences to optimize farm animal output.

James Belshaw, Deputy Warden of New England University College, saw the letter and brought it to the attention of the school's advisory council's Special Committee on Animal Husbandry. At that time, the college was preparing to become an independent university and was looking to differentiate itself with a farm-based degree program that was different from what the University of Sydney had to offer, but which would also be applicable and beneficial to the rural New England area.

With approval from the committee, Belshaw asked McClymont in July 1953 to prepare a paper further explaining his ideas on the topic of educational curricula related to farm animal production. McClymont's paper, submitted on 8 September 1953, was titled, "Planning Rural Science and Possible Curriculum". In the paper, McClymont further expounded his views and, as the title indicated, suggested that a better name for the prospective faculty would be "rural science". In February 1954, Robert Madgwick, vice-chancellor of the newly independent university, reviewed McClymont's paper. Convinced by McClymont's reasoning, Madgwick recommended to the university council the establishment of a faculty of rural science. On 16 October 1954 the University of New England offered McClymont the position of Chair of the soon-to-be established Department of Rural Science.

== University of New England ==
=== Rural science ===
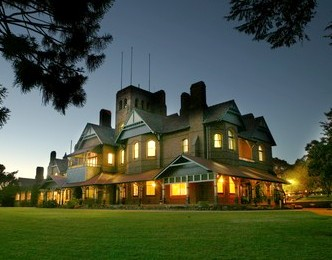
Booloominbah, the original facility of the University of New England, photographed in 2009

McClymont's appointment to the University of New England Faculty of Rural Science took effect in March 1955, one year after the university's independence. Upon arrival, McClymont was surprised by the school's humble facilities. He had to borrow a chair since his office did not have one. Madgwick had assumed that it would take at least two years to get the new department up and running. McClymont, however, pointed out to Madgwick that the program could begin accepting enrolments in 1956 because the existing faculty of science could already offer first-year courses in several basic science topics needed for the degree program.

On 11 July 1955, McClymont gave the degree program's inaugural address in the auditorium of nearby Armidale Teachers' College, titled "All Flesh is Grass" after a passage in the Biblical Book of Isaiah. In the speech, McClymont explained his vision for the goals of the rural science program, saying, "The economic health of this country, and so the standard of civilization which it will support, rests on the fertility of its soils and on the resultant productivity of its pastures, livestock and crops."

The degree program was the first of its kind to implement a multi-disciplinary approach to farm animal production science. It combined elements of agronomy, biochemistry, physiology, veterinary science, soil and agricultural ecology (agricultural science), biology, economics, social sciences, and animal nutrition and husbandry to teach students how all these elements interacted to create a productive agricultural ecosystem. Graduates from the new program were more generalists than specialists in order to help them find and implement original solutions to varied problems with Australia's livestock production, then still struggling with output and sustainability issues. The impact of the resulting improvements in Australia's livestock production was seen in Australians becoming among the world's biggest per capita meat consumers.

Classes in the degree program began in March 1956 with an initial enrolment of 17 students. Five hundred students had graduated with bachelors in rural science by the early 1980s. One hundred sixty graduated with honours. Seventy had attained master's degrees in the discipline. Graduates included Bridget Ogilvie, director of the Wellcome Trust, Hugh Beggs, Life Governor of the Australian Sheep Breeders Association and Chair of both the Australian Wool Corporation and the International Wool Secretariat, I Made Nits, Professor of Nutrition and Tropical Forage at Udayana University, and Robert Clements, Director of the Australian Centre for International Agricultural Research. As of 2005, approximately 1,700 students had passed through the rural science program.

As chair of the department, McClymont advocated and helped establish functionally autonomous agricultural education community centres around the New England area. The centres, supported by both the Departments of Rural Science and Agricultural Economics, were patterned after university external agricultural centres in the United States. The centres were financially independent and so avoided control by the university's central administration.

McClymont's writings and lectures while at the university emphasized the importance of sustainability in agricultural ecosystems. He is considered to be the originator of the term "sustainable agriculture". McClymont diagrammed the key elements of agricultural ecosystems into a series of flowcharts which were often used by other agricultural instructors. He alerted the agricultural community to the issues involved with feeding grain to livestock while the world was experiencing a shortage of grain.

=== Further activities ===
During the 1960s and 1970s, the University of New England became a prominent international centre in ruminant research. McClymont published a series of articles in academic journals on biochemistry and animal nutrition, including pregnancy toxaemia in sheep, poultry nutrition, and mineral deficiencies in dairy cattle. He promoted an original approach to researching metabolic diseases in livestock, utilizing radioactive tracer methods to identify "the quantitative importance of various metabolites including glucose, volatile fatty acids, B-hydroxybutyrate and long chain fatty acids in ruminant metabolism, and the metabolic interactions between these materials".

McClymont and Professor R. B. Cumming established the Poultry Research Fund Group at the Tamworth Adult Education Centre to facilitate the exchange of ideas between the university's rural science and agricultural economics departments and the poultry industry. The group first met on 1 July 1963. In 1967 McClymont was awarded the Australian Poultry Award for his work in poultry nutrition and with the poultry industry, particularly in the Namoi River region.

In 1967, McClymont proposed the establishment of a School of Biological Sciences at the university because of expansion of the topic within the Department of Rural Science. The school was founded the next year.

McClymont served on the advisory standing committee of eight for the independent but university-affiliated Kellogg Rural Adjustment Unit. The formal commencement for the unit was on 1 July 1976, with operations beginning the next year. The name of the organization was later changed to Rural Development Centre. The purpose of the centre, among other objectives, was to provide education on rural issues and policies, play a role in the development of rural policies, and assist rural communities in adjusting to changes in their cultural and economic environments.

Ribbon awarded to civilian recipients of the Order of Australia

While at the university, McClymont consulted to the Food and Agriculture Organization of the United Nations. In 1975 the organization published a booklet he authored, titled Formal Education and Rural Development. On 26 January 1978, citing his "service to veterinary science and to agricultural research", the Commonwealth of Australia designated McClymont an Officer in the Order of Australia.

McClymont retired from the university in 1980 and was appointed an emeritus professor. Professor J. S. Ryan said, "Fifty years on, he is widely recognized – and acclaimed – as being so far ahead of his time in recognizing the vital interaction between animal and plant production and in the importance of a healthy ecosystem."

== Retirement ==
In retirement, McClymont continued to consult with the Food and Agriculture Organization of the United Nations in its Department of Agricultural Education, Research, and Rural Matters. In addition, he consulted on agricultural issues with the World Bank.

As an emeritus professor, McClymont observed and commented on issues with the rural science curriculum at New England. An external review, began in 1979 by the university with help from an independent committee of agricultural specialists from the Australian Academy of Science, recommended curriculum changes, which were implemented in 1982. The most significant change was increased freedom given to students to choose electives in the fourth year of study, allowing limited specialization in certain subject areas. McClymont lamented the changes, feeling that they damaged the quality and standing of the rural science degree program.

In 1994, McClymont and New England professor J. S. Ryan began work on the book Rural Science: Philosophy and Application. In 1996 a special conference was held at the University of New England to commemorate the 40th anniversary of the establishment of the rural science curriculum. Although he was in failing health, McClymont attended as a guest of honour. Rural Science was formally presented at the conference. Said Ryan of the book, "This work is less of a respective chronicle, but is one arising from a more reflective, forward-looking, questioning, and nationally and globally focused essays".

== Death ==
After years of struggling with Parkinson's disease, McClymont died on 6 May 2000. A building on New England's Armidale campus was named after him. He was survived by his wife, Vivienne, and their four children, daughter Vicky and sons Kim, Glen, and Rod.

== Personality ==
McClymont believed in challenging dogma, which sometimes earned him enmity from colleagues and associates. J. S. Ryan described McClymont as "devastatingly honest", but "always likeable and compassionate". He reportedly placed emphasis on the welfare of his students. For example, McClymont criticized the 1963 decision by the University Council to abolish room-visiting between female and male students.

McClymont's personal interests included acting, singing, and landscape gardening. He sang bass in New England's University Choir.

== Awards and honours ==
- 1941 University of Sydney Medal and First Class Honours
- 1947 Walter and Eliza Hall Veterinary Research Fellowship
- 1967 Australian Poultry Award
- 1978 Officer of the Order of Australia
- 1986 Honorary Doctor of Rural Science, University of New England

== Selected publications ==
- McClymont, G. L. (1949). Interrelations of the Digestive and Mammary Physiology of Ruminants (Dissertation report to the University of Sydney and Walter and Eliza Hall Trust on research work carried out during tenure of the Walter and Eliza Hall Veterinary Research Fellowship Dec. 1947-Dec. 1949). University of Cambridge. OCLC 220646122.
- McClymont, G. L. (1953). Raising Dairy Calves. Sydney: New South Wales Department of Agriculture. p. 32. OCLC 21349663.
- McClymont, G. L.; Peter J. Mylrea; G. M. D. Carse; New South Wales Department of Agriculture, Division of Animal Industry (1955). Feeding Pigs for Profit. Sydney: Pettifer. p. 24. OCLC 71108668.
- Elkin, Adolphus Peter (editor); Gordon McClymont (1962). "Chapter No. 8, Plant and Animal Nutrition". A Goodly Heritage: ANZAAS Jubilee: Science in New South Wales. Organizing Committee of the Thirty-Sixth Meeting of the Australian and New Zealand Association for the Advancement of Science. Sydney: ANZAAS. OCLC 154164960.
- McClymont, G. L. (1975). Formal Education and Rural Development. Occasional paper - Agricultural Education and Extension Service of the Human Resources, Institutions and Agrarian Reform Division. Rome: Food and Agriculture Organization of the United Nations. p. 23. OCLC 2454354.
- Ryan, J. S. (Editor); G. L. McClymont (1996). Rural Science: Philosophy and Application. Armidale, New South Wales: School of Rural Science, University of New England. p. 548. ISBN 978-1-86389-386-2. OCLC 39839079.
