= List of Old Falconians =

This is a list of notable Old Falconians, alumni of North Sydney Boys High School. The Old Falconians Union is the alumni body of the school. The name "Old Falconians" is derived from Falcon Street which is the address of the school. All pupils who once attended the school are considered a part of the union, even if they were only on the roll for a short amount of time.

== Politics ==
- Mark Aarons – former political adviser to NSW Labor Premier Bob Carr, journalist, author and activist
- John Armitage OAM – Deputy Speaker of the Australian Parliament, Federal Member for Mitchell (1961–63) and Chifley (1969–83)
- Michael Baume AO – Federal Member for Macarthur (1975–1983), NSW Senator (1985–1996)
- Professor Peter Baume AC – NSW Senator (1974–1991), Federal Minister for Aboriginal Affairs (1980-1982), Federal Health Minister (1982), Federal Education Minister (1982-1983), Chancellor of Australian National University (1994–2005)
- Sir Vernon Christie – Victorian Member for Ivanhoe (1955-1973), Speaker of Victorian Parliament (1967–73)
- Peter Coleman AO – NSW Member for Fuller (1968–1978), Leader of the NSW Opposition (1977–1978), Federal Member for Wentworth (1981–1987), editor of The Bulletin
- Alan Hulme KBE – Federal Member for Petrie (1949-1961, 1963-1972), Federal Vice-President of the Executive Council (1966-1972), Postmaster-General of Australia (1963-1972)
- Frederick Osborne CMG DSC – Federal Member for Evans (1949-1961
- Michael Richardson – NSW Member for The Hills (1993-2007), NSW Member for Castle Hill (2007-2011)
- Tom Roper – Victorian Member for Brunswick West (1973-1976), Victorian Member for Brunswick (1976-1992), Victorian Member for Coburg (1992-1994), Victorian Treasurer (1990–1992)
- Kerry Sibraa – NSW Senator (1975–1994), President of Australian Senate (1987–1994)

== Law ==
- Justice Colin Begg QC – Judge of NSW Supreme Court (1964-1984), Chief Judge at Common Law (1983–84), also attended Sydney Grammar School
- Justice Richard Conti QC – Judge of Federal Court of Australia (2000-2007)
- Justice Arthur Emmett AO KC – Judge of the Federal Court of Australia (1997-2013), Judge of the New South Wales Court of Appeal (2013-2015)
- The Right Honourable Sir Frank Kitto AC KBE QC – Justice of the High Court of Australia (1950–1970), Chancellor of University of New England (1970-1981), inaugural Chairman of the Australian Press Council (1976-1982)
- Professor Ted McWhinney QC – Canadian lawyer specialising in Canadian constitution law and international law, Professor of International Law at Simon Fraser University, Canadian Member for Vancouver Quadra (1993-2000)
- Justice Athol Moffitt AM CMG QC – Judge of NSW Supreme Court (1959, 1962-1984), President of NSW Court of Appeal (1974-1984), known for the Moffitt Royal Commission
- Justice Sir John Moore AC – President of Commonwealth Conciliation and Arbitration Commission (1973-1985)

== Religion ==
- Eric Austin Gowing – Anglican Bishop of Auckland, New Zealand (1960-1978)
- Rupert Grove – solicitor and a prominent Methodist and Uniting Church layman
- Clive Kerle – Anglican Bishop coadjutor of Sydney (1956-1965), Anglican Bishop of Armidale (1965-1976)
- Sir Marcus Loane KBE – debut native-born Anglican Archbishop of Sydney (1966–1982), Anglican Primate of Australia (1978–1981) (also attended King's School)
- Rev Winston O'Reilly OBE – President-General of the Methodist Church of Australasia (1972–74), former Principal of Methodist Ladies' College, Burwood (1960-1965)
- Most Rev Donald Robinson AO – Anglican Archbishop of Sydney (1982-1992) (also attended SCEGS)
- James Udy OAM – an Australian Uniting Church minister, Master of Wesley College, University of Sydney and author

== Public service ==
- John Brew AM RFD, CEO of State Rail Authority of NSW (1992–1995), MD of State Transit Authority of NSW (1988–1992), President of Baptist Unions of NSW & ACT (2011–2012)
- Chris Conybeare, former secretary of Department of Immigration and Ethnic Affairs (1993–1996) and secretary of Department of Immigration, Local Government and Ethnic Affairs (1990–1993)
- Dr Michael Fullilove AM (Captain and Dux of School 1989) – adviser to Prime Minister Paul Keating, Director of Global Issues Program at Lowy Institute for International Policy, columnist for various publications
- Ian Lawrence CBE, former Deputy Mayor of Wellington, New Zealand (1974-1983), Mayor of Wellington, New Zealand (1983–86), Chairman of National Housing Commission of New Zealand
- David Rosalky, secretary of Department of Industrial Relations (1995-1997), secretary of Department of Workplace Relations and Small Business (1997-1998), secretary of Department of Social Security (1998), secretary of Department of Family and Community Services (1998–2001)
- Rae Taylor AO, secretary of Department of Employment and Youth Affairs (1978-1982), secretary of Department of Transport and Construction (1982-1983), secretary of Department of Transport (1983-1986), secretary of Department of Aviation (1986-1987), secretary of Department of Industrial Relations (1987-1989)

== Business and industry ==
- Arthur Ernest Bishop, inventor with over 300 patents in 17 countries, one in five of the world's cars use his power and variable-ratio rack-and-pinion steering technology
- Alexander Boden AO, FAA Hon DSc, Philanthropist, industrialist and publisher, founder of Boden Chair of Human Nutrition at Sydney University, founder of Bioclone Australia, Hardman Chemicals and Science Press, awarded Leighton Medal of Royal Australian Chemical Institute 1986, author of A Handbook of Chemistry 1937 (11 editions)
- David M. Morgan, Chancellor of Deakin University, former President of Ford Motor Company Australia
- Maurice Newman AC, Chairman of ABC, Chairman of Australian Stock Exchange, Chairman of Deutsche Bank, Chancellor of Macquarie University

== Academia ==
- Emeritus Professor Noel Beadle, Professor of Botany at University of New England 1955–79, Clarke Medal of Royal Society of NSW 1982, author of Vegetation of Australia (1981)
- Professor Richard Bryant AC, Scientia Professor of Psychology at the University of New South Wales and Director of the Traumatic Stress Clinic, Appointed Companion of the Order of Australia for his work in Indigenous and refugee mental health, and as an adviser to government and international organisations
- Rev Arthur Capell Hon D Litt FAAH, linguist and anthropologist, Reader in Linguistics at Sydney University, authority on Australian Aboriginal and Oceanic languages, author of A New Approach to Australian Linguistics
- Professor Raewyn Connell, polled the most influential contemporary Australian sociologist, former Visiting Professor of Australian Studies at Harvard, known for research on large-scale class dynamics ("Ruling Class, Ruling Culture", 1977 and "Class Structure in Australian History", 1980), and the ways class and gender hierarchies are re-made in the everyday life of schools ("Making the Difference", 1982), advisor to UNESCO and UNO initiatives relating men, boys and masculinities to gender equality and peacemaking, her work is translated into 13 languages
- Professor John J. Furedy, Professor of Psychology at the University of Toronto (1975–2005), President of the Society for Academic Freedom and Scholarship, co-author of Theories and Applications in the Detection of Deception: A Psychophysiological and International Perspective
- Professor Charles Hamblin, philosopher and pioneer computer scientist. In philosophy, he advanced the classical logical fallacies, using the formal dialogue games first studied by Aristotle. In computer science, he was the originator of the recursive stack (or last-in, first-out store), an idea implemented in 1957. Also, inventor of Reverse Polish Notation
- Professor Wallace Kirsop FAHA, the debut Australian to be a member of the École Normale Supérieure in Paris, in 1980–81 held the appointment of Sandars Reader in Bibliography at Cambridge
- Dr Robert Madgwick, educationist. Madgwick was commander of the Australian Army Education Service during World War II, then inaugural Vice-Chancellor of the University of New England. From 1967 to 1973 he was chairman of the Australian Broadcasting Corporation
- Dr David Makinson, Professor in Department of Computer Science at King's College, London University, authority on mathematical logic
- Professor Raymond Martin AO, FAA, FTSE, FRACI, former Vice-Chancellor of Monash University
- Dr Milton Osborne, authority on Southeast Asia and the French role there; Visiting Professor at Yale 1974–75; First Director of the British Institute in Southeast Asia 1975–79; Author of numerous books on Asian issues including Before Kampuchea: Preludes to Tragedy
- Dr David G. Peterson, scholar of the New Testament
- Dr Michael Taussig, Class of 1933 Professor of Anthropology at Columbia University and also Professor at European Graduate School in Switzerland, acclaimed for his commentaries on Karl Marx and Walter Benjamin, especially in relation to the idea of commodity fetishism, winner of a Berlin Prize 2007 from the American Academy in Berlin, author of The Devil and Commodity Fetishism in South America (1980) and Shamanism, Colonialism and the Wild Man: A Study in Terror and Healing (1987)

== Science and medicine ==
- Dr Andrew Vern-Barnett AM, MBE, the pioneer in Australia of the care and treatment of autistic children, the Autistic Children's Association which he chaired at its beginning in 1966 has grown to over 600 staff and claims to be the largest single autism specific school system in the world with 800 students
- Emeritus Professor Robert Clancy AM, Professor of Discipline of Immunology & Microbiology, University of Newcastle, Inventor of vaccine against bronchitis, author of The Mapping of Terra Australis
- Professor Richard Hunstead, former Head of the Astrophysics Group at Sydney University, one of 33 Australian Science Citation Laureates, the minor planet 171429 Hunstead is named in his honour
- Emeritus Professor Alan Mackay-Sim, 2017 Australian of the Year
- Sir John Kempson Maddox, cardiologist and co-founder of the National Heart Foundation of Australia
- Gordon McClymont, agricultural scientist, Foundation Chair of the Faculty of Rural Science at the University of New England, and originator of the term "sustainable agriculture"
- Dr Leo Radom AC FAA, Professor of Chemistry at Sydney University, Professor in Research School of Chemistry at Australian National University, specialist in computational quantum chemistry, awarded Schrödinger Medal 1994, H G Smith Medal 1988 and Rennie Medal 1977

== Arts and media ==
- Hartley 'Hart' Amos, an influential and prolific early Australian comic book artist
- Richard Appleton, poet, raconteur and editor who became editor-in-chief of the Australian Encyclopaedia
- Leigh Blackmore, horror writer, critic, editor and occultist
- Tom Cashman (comedian), comedian and television presenter
- Aaron Chen, comedian and actor
- Paul Chester Jerome Brickhill, author of The Dam Busters, Reach for the Sky, The Great Escape
- Robert Dessaix, novelist, essayist and journalist, his first fictional work, Night Letters, was published in 1996 and translated into German, French, Italian, Dutch, Finnish and Portuguese
- Gordon Gostelow, English actor often cast in villainous roles; he appeared notably as Barkis in David Copperfield (1966) and as Newman Noggs in Nicholas Nickleby (1968)
- Ken G. Hall AO, OBE, first Australian to win an Oscar, awarded in 1942 for documentary Kokoda Front Line, his life is honoured by the Ken G. Hall Award for film preservation from the National Film and Sound Archive
- George Houvardas, actor well known for his role as Nick "Carbo" Karadonis in Packed to the Rafters, contestant on Dancing with the Stars 2010
- Alexander Francis "Lex" Marinos OAM, deputy chairperson of Australia Council, actor, writer, director, host of Late Night Legends on ABC Digital 2
- Chris Neal, musician, songwriter, record producer and screen composer
- Chris Noonan, director of the 1995 movie Babe
- Peter Overton, Television Journalist
- Ben Oxenbould, actor and comedian, best known for his role in the television series Hey Dad..!
- John Polson, actor and film director, founded Tropfest in 1994, the biggest short-film festival in the world, directed Hide and Seek in 2005, directed US television series including Flash Forward, Without a Trace, Fringe, The Mentalist, The Good Wife and Happy Town (expelled after completing Year 7, also attended Glenaeon)
- Greedy Smith, keyboardist/vocalist with Mental As Anything. Born Andrew McArthur Smith
- Nathan Waks, cellist in Sydney Symphony Orchestra, former director of Music at ABC, composer of score for My Brilliant Career
- Daniel Wyllie, actor

== Sport ==
- Allan Border, Australian Test Cricket Captain; holder of the world record for the number of consecutive Test appearances of 153 until it was surpassed by Alastair Cook in June 2018 and the number of Tests as captain, Australian of the Year in 1989, the Allan Border Medal, awarded to the leading Australian player each year, is named in his honour
- Ian Craig, the youngest Australian to play Test cricket (17 years 239 days) and the youngest Australian Test cricket captain (22 years)
- Tom Craig, field hockey player who represented Australia in the Olympic and Commonwealth Games.
- Jim Cross, rugby union (Northern Suburbs, NSW, Australia). Played three Tests for Australia in 1955
- Greg Florimo, Rugby League (North Sydney Bears, NSW and Australia)
- Colonel David Hanlin AM Represented New South Wales in cricket, Chief of Works RAE
- Emeritus Professor David Hawkins, 220 yards breaststroke gold medallist at 1950 Empire Games, 1952 Olympian at Helsinki, Lovett-Learned Professor of Business Administration at Harvard Business School
- Clarrie Davis, rugby union player
- Rob Heming, rugby union (Manly, New South Wales, Australia). He played 21s Tests for Australian between 1961 and 1967
- Ben Hinshelwood, Scottish Rugby international, as a Full Back won 19 Caps from 2002 to 2005, previously a centre with Sydney University Premiership XV 2001
- Graeme Hole, cricketer for New South Wales, South Australia (Captain) and Australia. Also played baseball for South Australia
- Alan Murray (golfer), Winner of 1961 Australian PGA Championship, 1962 French Open Golf Championship, Australian Wills Masters Champion 1967
- Jack Pettiford, Sheffield Shield cricketer for New South Wales who played over 200 first class matches in his career making 7077 runs, played for Australian Services in the 1945 'Victory Tests' against England and India and scored two centuries in the latter
- Rod Phelps, rugby union (Sydney University, Northern Suburbs, Parramatta, New South Wales, Australia). Played 23 Tests for Australia between 1955 and 1962, and captained the 1960 Shute Shield winning Northern Suburbs side
- Peter Philpott (Captain of School First XI 1950, including Ian Craig), Australian Test Cricketer, later coached widely including Sri Lanka, in the Sydney Grade Cricket Competition the Manly-Warringah and Mosman Clubs compete each year for the Peter Philpott Cup
- Justice John Purdy of the Family Court, Australian Chess Champion 1955, 1963; whilst at NSBH, he became Australian Junior Chess Champion
- Tony Steele, Australian international cricketer, selected to tour NZ with Australia 'B' in 1970
- Andy Stewart, rugby union player
- John Treloar AM, the debut Australian to run in Final of 1952 Olympic Summer Games 100 Metres Sprint in Helsinki. He is memorialized in the dedication of the gymnasium at North Sydney Boys High School in his name
- Rugby League Internationals Herman Peters (later Coach of Kangaroos 'The Invincibles' on their historic unbeaten tour of England and France in 1982), and Don McKinnon

== Foreign affairs ==
- Dato Tom Critchley AO CBE – Malaysian Knight, High Commissioner to Malaysia (1955–1965), Ambassador to Thailand (1965–1973), High Commissioner to Papua New Guinea (1974–1978), Ambassador to Indonesia (1978–1981)
- HE Gerry Nutter, Australian Ambassador to the Philippines (1975–1978), Australian High Commissioner to Papua New Guinea(1978–1981), Australian Ambassador to Italy (1985–1987)

== Armed forces ==
- Admiral Chris Barrie AC – Chief of the Australian Defence Force
- Brigadier Adrian d'Hage MC – author of The Omega Scroll
- Admiral Michael Hudson AC – Chief of Naval Staff
- Vice Admiral Stuart Mayer AO CSC & Bar – Deputy Commander United Nations Command, based in South Korea, from July 2019. Commander of Australian Fleet from June 2014, Commander from 2009 of the International Stabilisation Force (ISF), former Commander of HMAS Canberra
- Rear-Admiral Peter Sinclair AC – Governor of NSW (1990–1996), Flag Officer Commanding the Australian Fleet
- Air Commodore Gordon Steege DSO, DFC – senior RAAF officer and fighter ace of World War II
- Major-General Arthur Wilson CBE, DSO – Commander BCOF Japan

== Miscellaneous ==
- Professor John Hamilton Andrews AO, architect, designer of Scarborough College Toronto, Harvard Graduate School of Design, Cameron Offices Canberra, American Express Tower Sydney (original form), Intelsat HQ Building Washington, D.C. and the CN Tower in Toronto, Ontario, Canada. Completed in 1976, it became the world's tallest free-standing structure and world's tallest tower at the time. It held both records for 34 years. In 1995, the CN Tower was declared one of the modern Seven Wonders of the World by the American Society of Civil Engineers
- Raymond Hoser, wildlife activist and authority, has published numerous articles in journals worldwide, author of Australian Reptiles and Frogs
- Dorjee Sun, a social entrepreneur, is the CEO of Carbon Conservation. His work for Carbon Conservation was a subject of the international feature documentary The Burning Season in 2008. In 2009 a newly discovered species of blue spotted chameleon from the rainforests of Tanzania was named after Sun. In 2009 Time Magazine recognised Sun as a Hero of the Environment
- Sir Anthony Trollope, 16th Baronet of Casewick. and Sir Anthony Trollope, 17th Baronet of Casewick (direct descendants of English novelist Anthony Trollope)
- Bill Waterhouse, barrister, in May 2010 retired from the betting ring at the age of 88 years, once known as the world's biggest bookmaker, famous for his betting duels with the big punters of the past, he took what is believed to be the debut $1 million bet on a horse race when the "Filipino Fireball" Felipe Ysmael challenged him to a wager in 1968, Ysmael won the bet, but was still left owing money to Waterhouse at the end of the day, former Consul General for Tonga

== Bibliography ==
- Who's Who in Australia 1985, ed. W. J. Draper, The Herald and Weekly Times Limited, Melbourne, 1985, ISSN 0810-8226.
- Monash Biographical Dictionary of 20th Century Australia, eds. John Arnold and Deirdre Morris, Reed Reference Publishing, Port Melbourne, 1994, ISBN 1-875589-19-8.
- Who's Who in Australia 1965, ed. Joseph A. Alexander, Colorgravure Publications, 1965.
- Pollard, Jack, Australian Rugby: The Game and the Players
