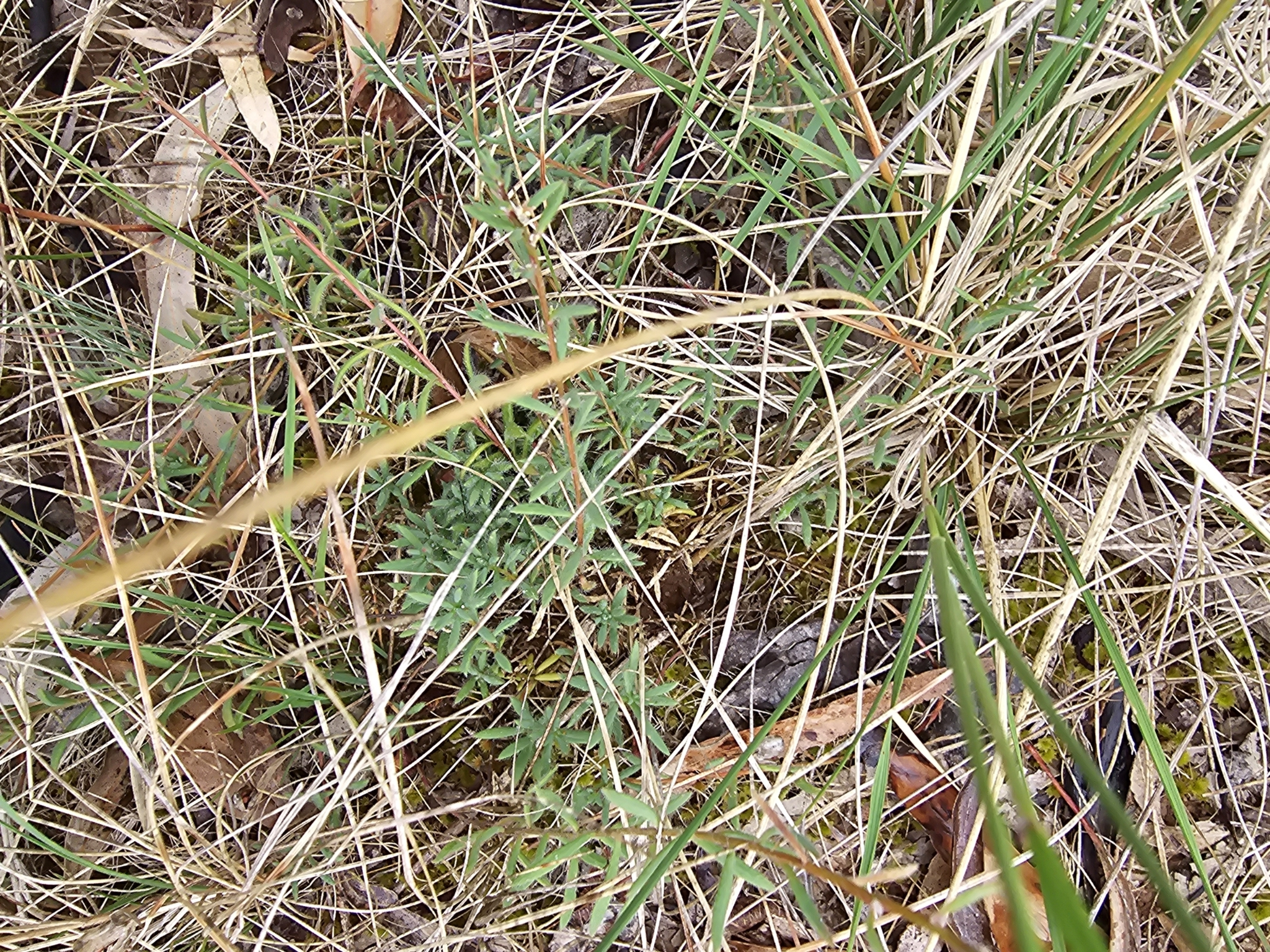

Scientific classification
- Kingdom: Plantae
- Clade: Tracheophytes
- Clade: Angiosperms
- Clade: Eudicots
- Order: Caryophyllales
- Family: Amaranthaceae
- Genus: Maireana
- Species: M. enchylaenoides

Binomial name
- Maireana enchylaenoides (F.Muell.) Paul G.Wilson

Synonyms
- Bassia enchylaenoides F.Muell.; Chenolea enchylaenoides F.Muell. nom. illeg.; Chenolea villosa (F.Muell.) Ewart; Duriala crassiloba N.C.W.Beadle nom. inval.; Duriala villosa (F.Muell.) Ulbr.; Enchylaena villosa F.Muell.; Heterochlamys villosa F.Muell. nom. inval., nom. nud.; Heterochlamys villosa J.M.Black nom. inval., pro syn.; Kochia crassiloba R.H.Anderson nom. illeg.

= Maireana enchylaenoides =

Species of plant

Maireana enchylaenoides, commonly known as wingless bluebush or wingless fissure-weed, is a species of flowering plant in the family Amaranthaceae and is endemic to Australia. It is a perennial herb with scattered, slightly fleshy, narrowly oblong leaves, bisexual flowers arranged singly, and a fruiting perianth with a thin-walled tube with 5 leathery wings.

== Description ==
Maireana enchylaenoides is a low-lying or weakly erect perennial plant that grows to a height of up to 30 cm (12 in). Its branches are about 30 cm (12 in) long and covered with soft hairs. Its leaves are linear to narrowly egg-shaped, 5–20 mm (0.20–0.79 in) long, and covered with soft or silky hairs. The flowers are bisexual and arranged singly in leaf axils. The fruiting perianth is thin-walled, about 3 mm (0.12 in) in diameter, with 5 leathery wings about 4 mm (0.16 in) in diameter.

== Taxonomy ==
This species was first described in 1876 by Ferdinand von Mueller who gave it the name Chenolea enchylaenoides in his Fragmenta Phytographiae Australiae, but the name was illegitimate In 1882, von Mueller changed the name to Bassia enchylaenoides in his Systematic Census of Australian Plants, and in 1975, Paul G. Wilson transferred the species to Maireana as M. enchylaenoides in the journal Nuytsia. The specific epithet (enchylaenoides) means 'Encelia-like'.

== Distribution and habitat ==
Maireana enchylaenoides usually grows in woodland in loamy soils and is found in southern Queensland, on the slopes and plains of New South Wales, north-western Victoria, the south of South Australia, the Avon Wheatbelt, Esperance Plains, Jarrah Forest and Mallee bioregions of south-western Western Australia.
