= Alexander Boden =

Australian philanthropist, industrialist, publisher

Alexander Boden AO FAA
- Born: Alexander Boden; 28 May 1913; Sydney, Australia
- Died: 18 December 1993 (aged 80); Sydney, Australia
- Other names: Aga, Alex
- Notable work: A Handbook of Chemistry
- Spouse: Elizabeth McVicar
- Relatives: (Son) Bill. (Daughters) Dr Alexandra, Dr Diana BSc(Hons) PhD ATCL, Elissa, Helena

Alexander Boden AO FAA (28 May 1913 – 18 December 1993) was a philanthropist, industrialist (manufacturing chemist), publisher (including education author and researcher), founder of the Boden Chair of Human Nutrition at the University of Sydney, a Fellow Australian Academy of Science 1982, a founder of Bioclone Australia, Hardman Chemicals and Science Press and was awarded Leighton Medal of Royal Australian Chemical Institute in 1986. He was educated at the University of Sydney (BSc 1933, Hon DSc 1984) and received an Order of Australia (AO) and he was also the author of A Handbook of Chemistry, initially published by the Shakespeare Head Press and later by his own Science Press. After he graduated, he joined a research laboratory, which he soon took over, and renamed it Hardman Australia. Hardman Australia was turned into a manufacturing company producing in particular DDT. In 1981 he formed Bioclone Australia, which exports diagnostic products. Alex was elected to the Australian Academy of Science on the nomination of Professor John Swan, upon nomination Professor Swan said:

"Alex Boden was a man of remarkable talents, concealed by a modest, even humble, exterior. I never saw him angry. He was greatly admired as a man who had achieved much in life but whose ambition was to contribute to family, social and community welfare, to give rather than take, to be supportive of others, and above all to foster the advancement of science."

== Early years ==
Alexander Boden was born on 28 May 1913, shortly after his parents William and Helena Boden arrived in Australia from Ireland. His parents established a drapery business in the main shopping centre of the Sydney suburb of Chatswood. Alex was the middle child between his two sisters.

His father, William Boden, was born in Ballinasloe on the border of counties Galway and Roscommon. In Williams youth, he went to join his uncle in the latter's evidently prosperous drapery story in Magherafelt, County Londonderry. A surviving photograph of the staff of the store is impressive: some fifty men and women in starched collars and prim blouses stand in well-ordered ranks. The move to Australia in 1913 followed the emigration of William's two brothers and a sister. His mother, formerly Helena Isabella Hutchinson, a schoolteacher, came from Knockboy, near Broughshane, County Antrim, of a family of schoolteachers and clerics.

Alex Boden's education was at Willoughby Public School and North Sydney Boys High School. His father's premises were owned by the pharmacists Washington H. Soul, Pattinson and Co. and one day, while the young Alex was still at school, his father asked his landlord what was the best career for a boy. ' Buyin' and sellin' ' was Dr. Pattinson's counsel. In a greatly expanded sense it could be said that Alex Boden followed this advice.

== Student years ==
In 1929 Alex passed the Leaving Certificate with honours in Mathematics and Chemistry. An exhibition took him to the University of Sydney, where he enrolled in science. He was drawn to this area due to chemical experiments he undertook while at school.

I can trace my interest in chemistry to my first chemical experiment in school, changing the colour of litmus paper. I took some paper home and spent an exciting afternoon changing it from pink to blue with vinegar and washing soda. This was something I could do without instruction or interference from others.

The last sentence revealing the hallmark of his life – self-reliance.

During his university years, Alex underwent extracurricular activity and set a possible record in ecumenism through his simultaneous membership of: the Student Christian Movement (he had been a Sunday school teacher at Willoughby Presbyterian church), of Professor John Anderson's notoriously subversive Freethought Society, and the Sydney University Regiment (Corporal 1931). He became a highly qualified Boy Scout leader. He spoke at the Sydney University Union's parliamentary-style Union Night debates and engaged in hockey and wrestling.

Alex recorded in his notebooks with carefully marshalled tables of the books he had read and his opinions of them. In his first university year, he records reading, wholly or in part, about a hundred books. Representative entries from that year include Better Ballroom Dancing by Scott (75% read) with a note 'Correction of mistakes etc.'; Goodbye to All That by Robert Graves (all read) 'Good realistic. No censoring of language'; Handbook of Photography by Sinclair (most read) 'Pretty good but a bit old-fashioned'; Religion and Science by Draper (all read) 'V. readable'; English Regal Copper Coins, by Bamah (most read); 'Coins 16721860. No pics. may be good for reference'; La Vie des Abeilles by Maeterlinck (2/3 read) 'V.g. Hard French. Interesting and novel'; Communist Manifesto by Marx and Engels (all read) 'Quite fair. Rather old but still interesting'. Alex continued, with unabated assiduity and eclecticism, right through to the end of his fourth year – 400 titles, all similarly noted.

He graduated with honours in the year 1933. While this account must shortly take up his business career, it will be convenient here to carry on with one of his subsequent extra-professional interests – the theatre. He joined The Playmakers and in 1934 made his debut in Crime Made Legal. Advance publicity noted that 'Alex Boden is a newcomer to the Society and is making his first appearance in the important part of Inspector Burke. His fine speaking voice and confident bearing are sure to find favour.' It must be assumed that they did, for he made at least a dozen subsequent appearances, mostly with Sydney's oldest repertory company, The Sydney Players. His notices were generally flattering, as in A Midsummer Night's Dream: 'As Theseus, Alex Boden was easily the most competent of last night's performers. He alone gave real dignity to his lines.'

After 1936, however, the store of programmes and press clippings stops. Life had acquired other dimensions. He wrote in his notebook:

Aged twenty-four and watching now the last grains of 1937 run through our fingers. A book [his Handbook of Chemistry] was born in January. Perhaps it will be worthy of rebirth. Almost a beginning on another. Finances are dull but they have been smoothed sufficiently to give a little takeoff for 1938. Sentiments not entirely controlled and showing no practical advance.

== See also ==
- List of Old Falconians (The notable alumni of North Sydney Boys High School)
- List of Fellows of the Australian Academy of Science
- Sydney University Regiment
