= Robert Clancy =

Robert Clancy may refer to:

- Robert H. Clancy (1882–1962), politician from the U.S. state of Michigan
- Robert Clancy (doctor), Australian developer of Broncostat which reduces attacks of bronchitis
