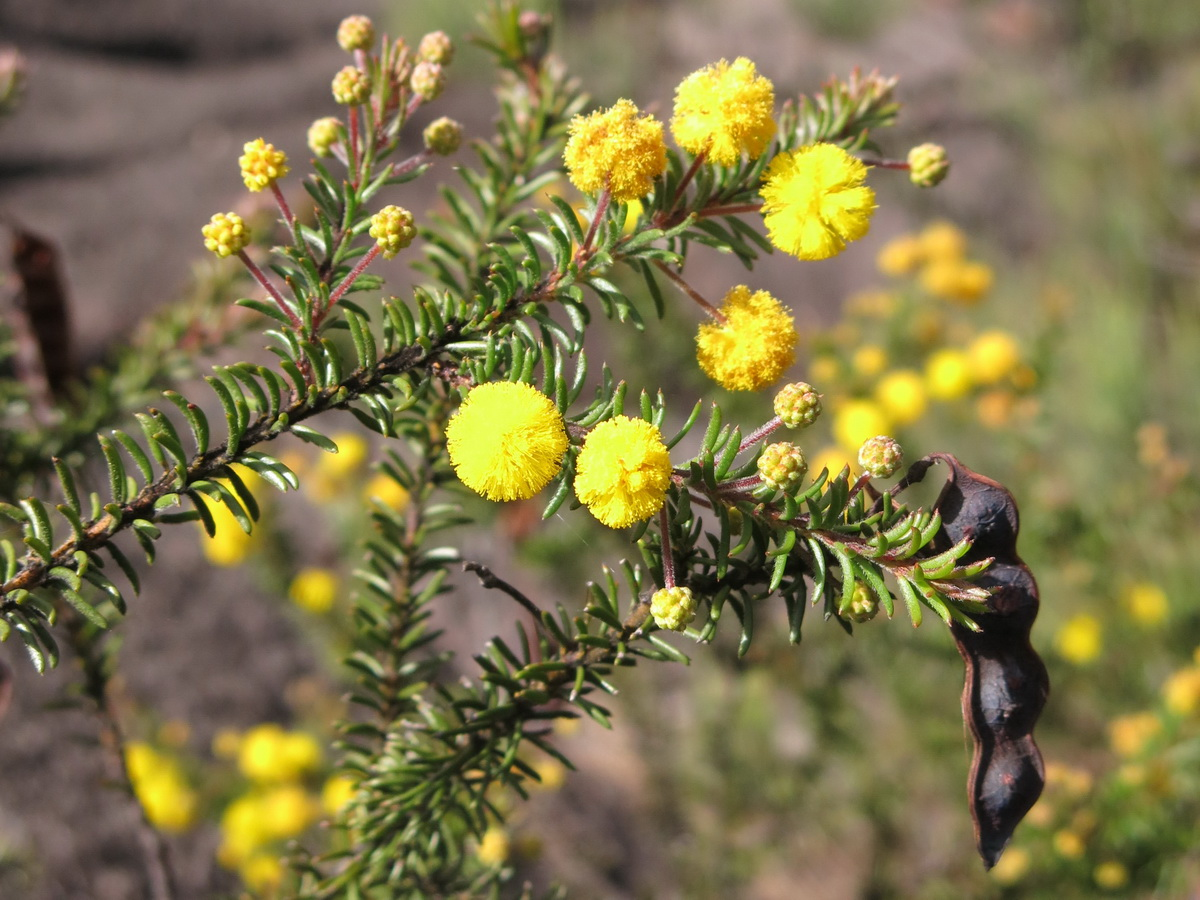
- In Gibraltar Range National Park

Scientific classification
- Kingdom: Plantae
- Clade: Tracheophytes
- Clade: Angiosperms
- Clade: Eudicots
- Clade: Rosids
- Order: Fabales
- Family: Fabaceae
- Subfamily: Caesalpinioideae
- Clade: Mimosoid clade
- Genus: Acacia
- Species: A. beadleana

Binomial name
- Acacia beadleana R.H.Jones & J.J.Bruhl
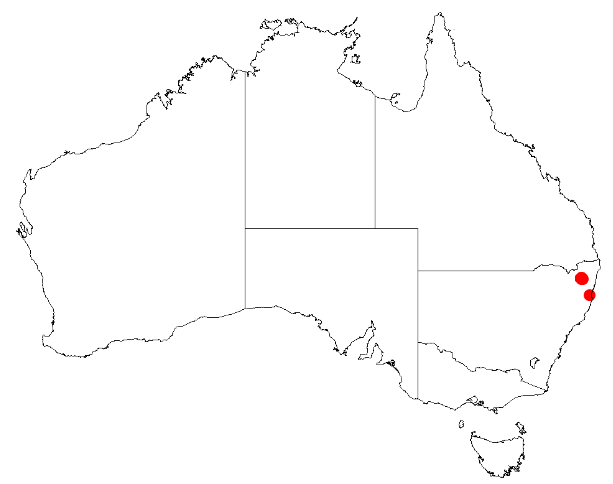
- Occurrence data from Australasian Virtual Herbarium

= Acacia beadleana =

Species of shrub

Acacia beadleana is a species of flowering plant in the family Fabaceae and is endemic to the Gibraltar Range National Park in northern New South Wales. It is a spreading shrub with hairy branchlets and straight to curved, flat phyllodes, spherical or oblong heads of flowers arranged singly in axils, and leathery oblong pods up to 60 mm (2.4 in) long.

== Description ==
Acacia beadleana is a spreading, lignotuberous shrub that typically grows to a height of 0.4–2.5 m (1 ft 4 in – 8 ft 2 in) and has hairy branchlets. Its phyllodes are often crowded, flat, straight to curved, 5–13 mm (0.20–0.51 in) long and 0.6–1.4 mm (0.024–0.055 in) wide with a hooked tip on the end. The flowers are borne in a spherical head in axils on a peduncle 6–16 mm (0.24–0.63 in) long, each head with 32 to 46 bright golden-yellow flowers. Flowering occurs most months with a peak from December to January, and the pods are oblong, leathery, dark brown and glabrous, 20–60 mm (0.79–2.36 in) long and mostly 7–10.5 mm (0.28–0.41 in) wide. The seeds are oblong or egg-shaped, 4–5 mm (0.16–0.20 in) long with a short aril on the end.

== Taxonomy ==
Acacia beadleana was first formally described in 2006 by the botanists Rodney H.Jones and Jeremy James Bruhl in the Proceedings of the Linnean Society of New South Wales from specimens collected by Bruhl, near the Gwydir Highway in the Gibraltar Range National Park in 1996. The specific epithet (beadleana) honours Noel Beadle the first Professor of Botany at the University of New England and a noted taxonomist and ecologist.

== Distribution and habitat ==
This species of wattle is only found in the Gibraltar Range in north western New South Wales where it grows along granite ridges and rocky slopes among granite outcrops in sandy soils in heath or open Eucalyptus woodland communities. The species has only a few known populations with only around 100 plants mostly found within the Gibraltar Range National Park.

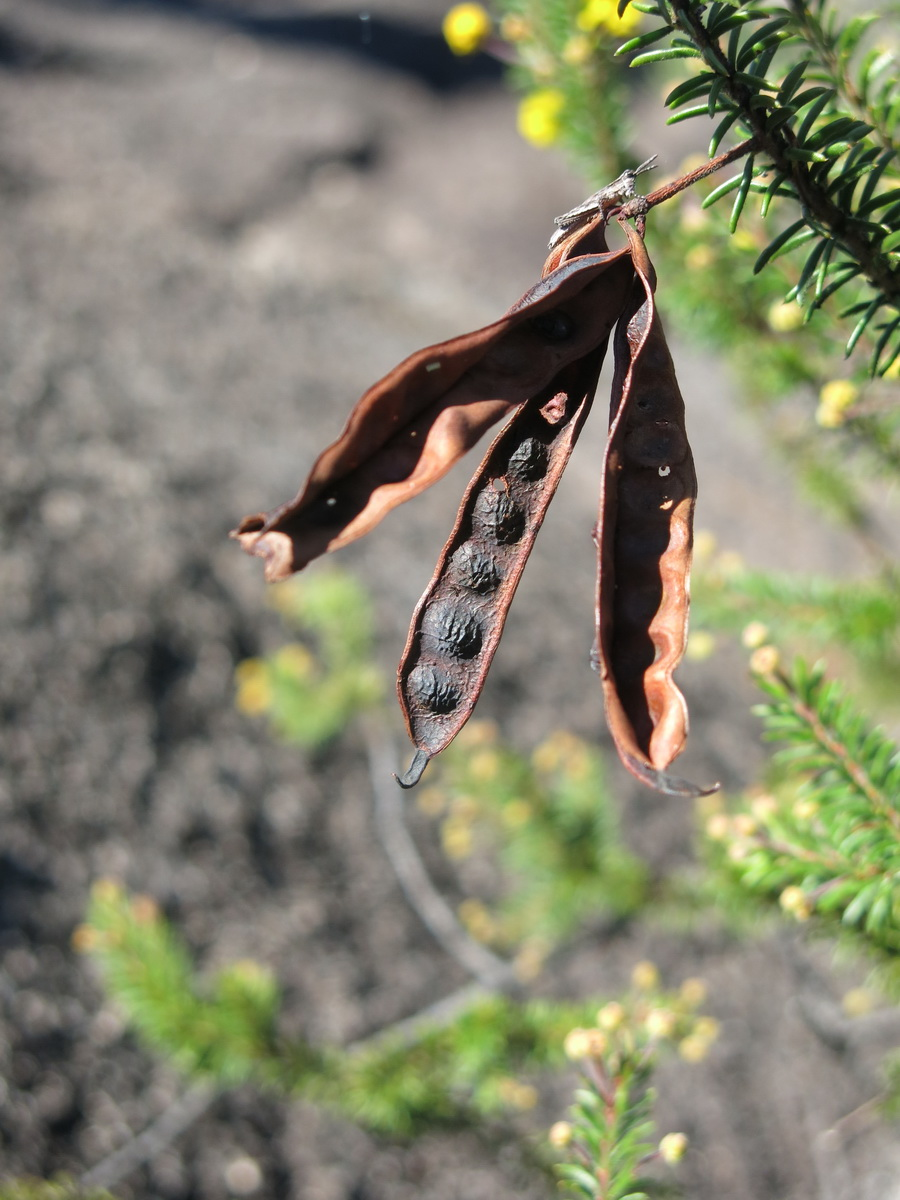
Seed pods

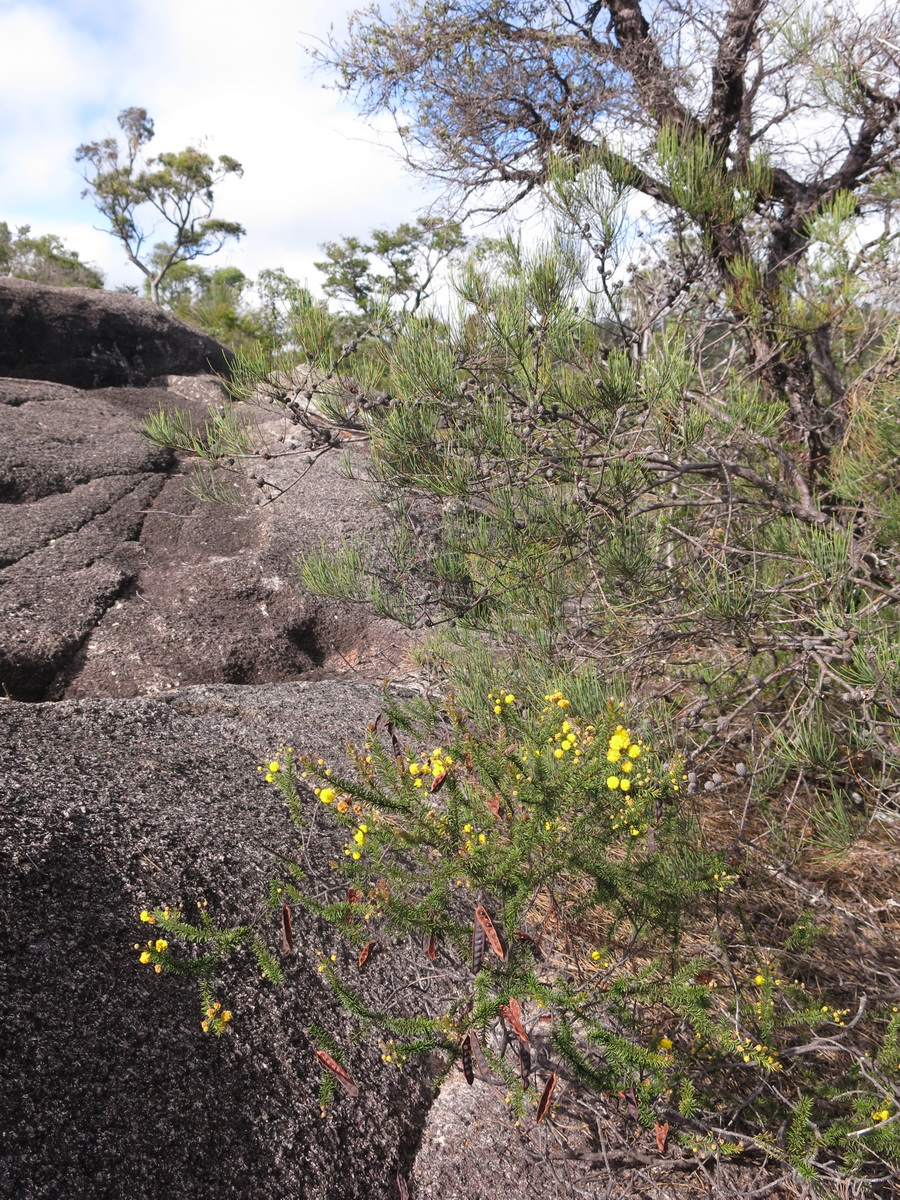
Habitat

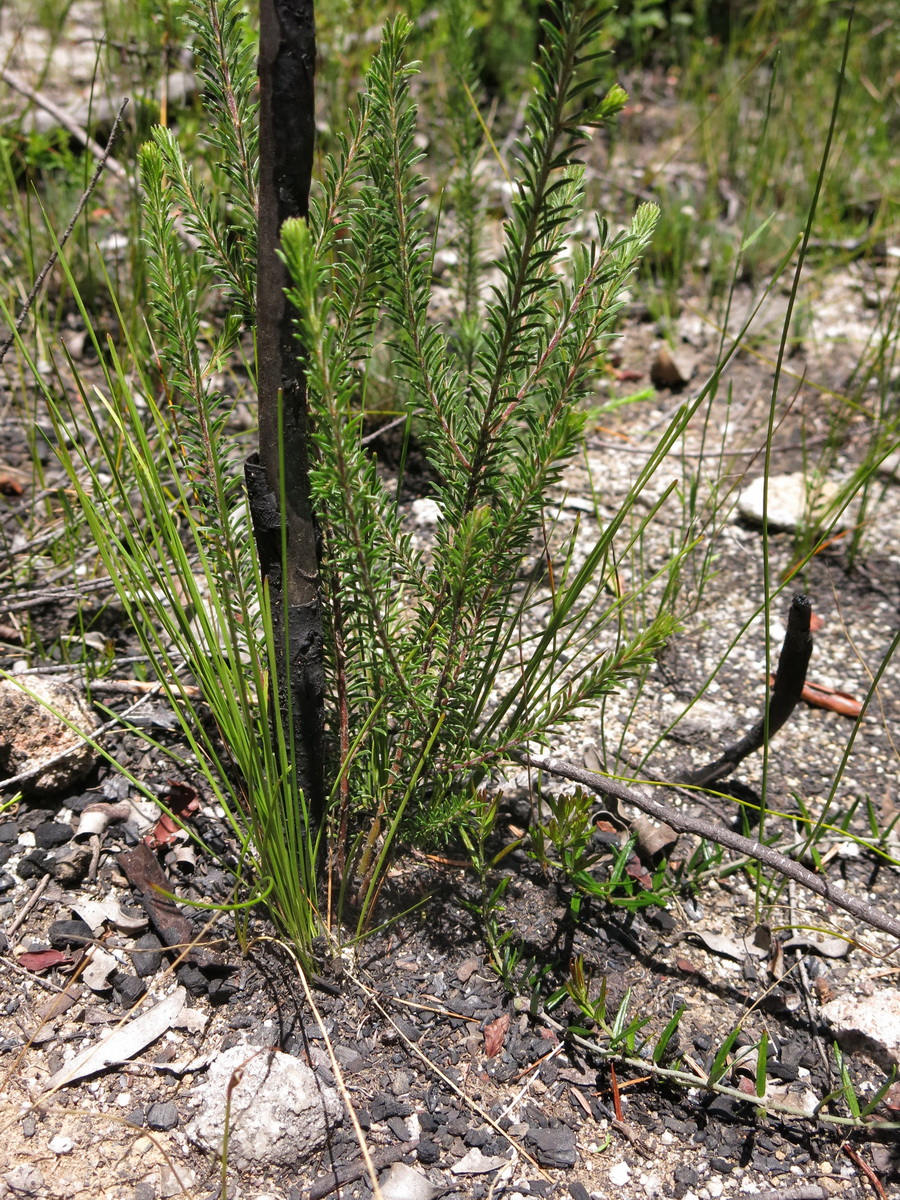
Regrowth and burnt trunk

== See also ==
- List of Acacia species
