= Charles Rattray Smith =

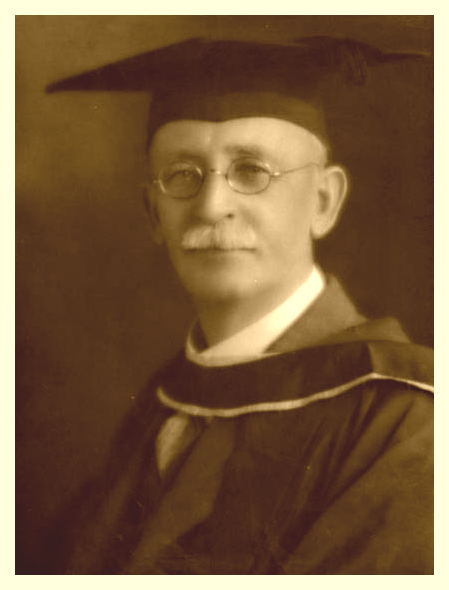
- "Caesar" Smith in academic dress
- Born: 29 December 1859; Rendall, Orkney Islands
- Died: 10 June 1941 (aged 81); Willoughby, New South Wales, Australia
- Resting place: Macquarie Park Cemetery, North Ryde
- Education: MA (Aberdeen)
- Occupations: teacher, headmaster
- Years active: 1880-1924

Charles Rattray Smith (1859–1941) taught in Britain before emigrating to New South Wales, where he taught classics and languages at various public schools. He was the inaugural headmaster of Newcastle High School from 1906. In 1915, he became headmaster at North Sydney; in 1919, he transferred to Sydney High School, where he was headmaster until taking long service leave in 1924 before his retirement in 1926.

== Early years ==
Charles Rattray Smith was born on 29 December 1859 in the Congregational Manse for the Parish of Rendall, Orkney, Orkney Islands, Scotland where his father, Alexander Smith, was the Congregational Minister; his mother was Clementina née Cobban.

== Education ==
He attended Aberdeen University and was graduated M.A. in 1880.

== Schoolmaster ==
Smith returned to Orkney as a schoolmaster: the 1881 Census finds him living in the Stronsay Schoolhouse with one of his elder sisters, Frances, as his housekeeper.

== Emigration to and early career in New South Wales ==
In 1883, he emigrated to New South Wales to take up his career as a teacher in public schools. His first appointment was as assistant teacher, Bathurst High School on its opening in October 1883 but soon after took up his first of three appointments at Sydney Boys High School. From March 1885, he acted as temporary headmaster of Goulburn High. Other appointments followed including to Fort-street Model School and Leichhardt Superior Public School, where he was first assistant master from 1897. In 1902, he returned to Sydney Boys High School as classics master under J. Waterhouse.

== Foundation Headmaster, Newcastle High School ==
He was tasked with the establishment of the new High School at Newcastle in 1906. He led the "School on the Hill" until 1915.

One of the school houses is named "Smith" in his honour.

== North Sydney Boys High ==
He became Headmaster, North Sydney Boys High in 1915, the second to hold the post, succeeding Nimrod Greenwood. When he arrived, he brought the nickname "Caesar" with him from Newcastle. The history of the early years of North Sydney Boys' High described him as a disciplinarian who favoured detention and would travel the classrooms in the afternoon in academic cap and gown announcing the names of those who would join him for an extra half-hour after school; nevertheless, he was described as "a man of great personal charm and is still remembered with affection by those who were at North Sydney during his time."

== Sydney Boys High ==
Following the sudden death of Robert John Hinder, Smith returned to Sydney High School (Mary Ann Street, Ultimo) in his final appointment as headmaster. He was introduced to the students at the 1918 Speech Day, where he received three cheers.

== Family life ==
On 24 December 1884, Charles married Alice Lydia Hartley at "Glencoe", Cadia, near Orange, New South Wales. A son, Alexander Gordon, was born in 1886 when Charles was posted to Goulburn; two daughters, Rosa Constance in 1889 and Olive Frances in 1891 were born during his tenure at metropolitan schools; the youngest, Adolphus Charles Cobban, was born in 1897, passing away in his 15th year at the family home, "Corio", Mayfield on 16 August 1912 and was buried 18 August 1912 in Sandgate Cemetery.

Charles Rattray Smith M.A. (Aberdeen) died at his residence "Tremenheere", 16 McClelland Street, Willoughby on 10 June 1941 aged 81 years. He was survived by his wife, Alice, and children (Alexander) Gordon, (Rosa) Constance (Mrs Frederick Joseph Harris) and Olive (Mrs Milton D. Hunter). He was buried in the Congregational Cemetery, Northern Suburbs (now Macquarie Park Cemetery, North Ryde) on 11 June 1941; his short obituary in the Sydney Morning Herald noted: "Many former pupils and colleagues attended his funeral."

Alice died on 31 January 1942 and was buried on 2 February 1942 with Charles.
