= John Kempson Maddox =

Sir John Kempson Maddox VRD FRCP (20 September 1901 – 27 July 1990) was an Australian cardiologist. He was a physician at Royal Prince Alfred Hospital in Sydney, and was involved in the establishment of several cardiology societies, including the National Heart Foundation of Australia.

== Life and career ==
Maddox was born in 1901 in St Clair, New Zealand, to English-born parents, and moved to Sydney with his family at the age of three. He attended North Sydney Boys High School before studying medicine at the University of Sydney and graduating in 1924. He began his medical career as a resident at Royal Prince Alfred Hospital in 1924–25 and then the Royal Alexandra Hospital for Children in 1926–27. He completed postgraduate training in London, where he gained membership of the Royal College of Physicians in 1928, before returning to Sydney in 1930.

Maddox was appointed an honorary assistant physician at Royal Prince Alfred Hospital in 1930 and was awarded a Doctor of Medicine the same year. Although he practiced general medicine, Maddox developed an interest in cardiology and founded the electrocardiography department at Royal Prince Alfred in 1932, as well as clinics for diabetes and rheumatology.

He served in the Royal Australian Navy during the Second World War as a surgeon lieutenant and later as a surgeon commander; he was demobilised in 1945 and resigned from the navy in 1950. In 1946, he brought one of the first cardiac catheters to Australia after visiting the United States on a Carnegie Fellowship. He persuaded his friend, the philanthropist Edward Hallstrom, to fund a cardiology institute at Royal Prince Alfred Hospital. He in 1951 he co-founded the Australasian Cardiac Society and he later helped to establish the Asian-Pacific Society of Cardiology. He also played a key role in the establishment of the National Heart Foundation of Australia in 1959 and was an active member of the foundation's national board and scientific advisory committee until 1966.

Maddox became an honorary consulting physician at Royal Prince Alfred Hospital upon reaching the mandatory retirement age of 60. He died in 1990 in Darlinghurst, New South Wales.

== Honours ==
Maddox was knighted in 1964. He served as president of the International Society of Cardiology in 1966, and became a Fellow of the Royal Australasian College of Physicians in 1938, a Fellow of the Royal College of Physicians in 1956, and a Fellow of the American College of Physicians in 1975. He received the inaugural Sir John Loewenthal Award of the Heart Foundation in 1982. In 1995, the Heart Foundation of Australia established the Kempson Maddox Award.
