= David Hanlin =

Australian cricketer (1928–2001)

Personal information
- Born: 8 December 1928; Sydney, Australia
- Died: 6 June 2001 (aged 72); Chester, Cheshire, England
- Source: ESPNcricinfo, 30 December 2016

Colonel David Hanlin AM (8 December 1928 – 6 June 2001) was an Australian cricketer. He was educated at North Sydney Boys High School, Royal Military College Duntroon and Sydney University. In the Royal Australia Engineers he became Chief of Works. His club cricket was with Sydney University. He played three first-class matches for New South Wales between 1948/49 and 1949/50.

== See also ==
- List of New South Wales representative cricketers
