= Andrew Vern-Barnett =

Australian autism activist

Andrew Elgar Vern-Barnett
- Born: 30 March 1923; Sydney, Australia
- Died: 15 July 2011 (aged 88)
- Occupation: Dentist
- Employer: Autistic Children's Association
- Known for: pioneer in Australia in the care and treatment of autistic children
- Spouse: Margaret Mary Cust
- Parent: George Vern Barnett

Andrew Elgar Vern-Barnett AM MBE (30 March 1923 – 15 July 2011) was a pioneer in Australia in the care and treatment of autistic children.

== Early life and education ==
Andrew Elgar Vern-Barnett was born in Sydney on 30 March 1923. He was the son of George Vern Barnett, organist and choir master, and his wife Doris Kathleen (née Gartrell). Andrew was educated at North Sydney Boys High School and studied dentistry at the University of Sydney, graduating BDS in 1944.

He returned to study at the same institution gaining a master's degree in dentistry in 1955 and a doctorate in dental science in 1959.

== Career ==
Vern-Barnett enlisted in the Australian Army on 12 December 1944 and served as a captain in 2MD Dental Unit until his discharge on 15 April 1947.

== Personal life ==
He married Margaret Mary Cust on 16 February 1946 at St Stephen's Presbyterian Church, Macquarie Street, Sydney. The youngest of their four children, Susan, was diagnosed with autism.

=== Philanthropy ===
In 1966, Andrew and Margaret joined with five other families to form the Autistic Children's Association of NSW. By 1969, the Association had raised $200,000 to establish the first school to provide autism-specific education programmes, now known as the Aspect Vern Barnett School.

Vern-Barnett chaired the board of the Autistic Children's Association from its beginning in 1966 until 1981, and then came back for a second stint in the mid-1980s. The organisation, now renamed Autism Spectrum Australia (Aspect), is in contact with 10,000 people with autism and their families each year, operates in 58 locations across NSW, ACT and Victoria, has over 600 staff, and claims to be the largest single autism specific school system in the world with 800 students.

In 1973, Andrew and Margaret were both appointed members of the Order of the British Empire (MBE). In 1985, Andrew was appointed a member of the Order of Australia (AM) while, in 1993, Margaret was awarded a medal of the Order of Australia (OAM). Margaret Vern-Barnett died in November 2005, and Andrew died on 15 July 2011.
