= Arthur Gillespie Wilson =

Australian army officer (1900–1982)

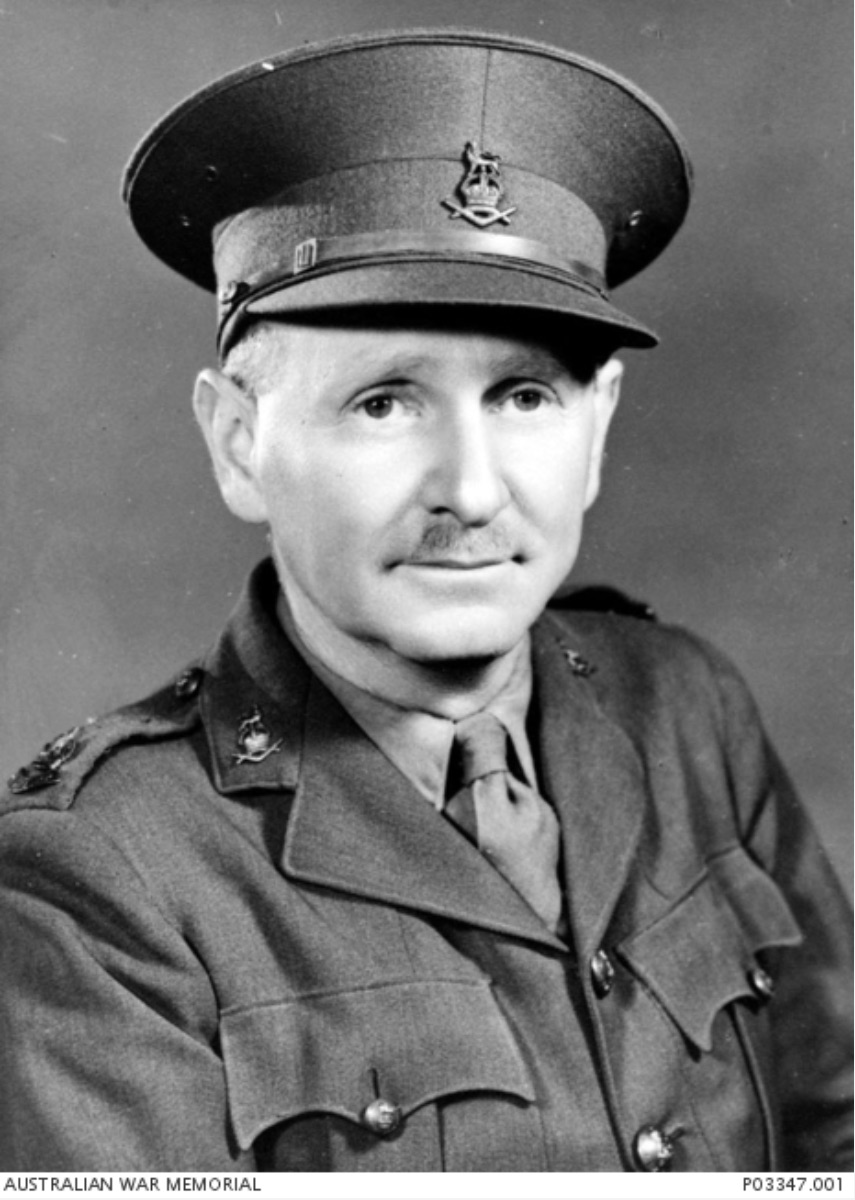
- Major Wilson in c. 1942
- Born: 29 September 1900; Sydney, New South Wales
- Died: 15 February 1982 (aged 81); Stirling, South Australia
- Burial place: Centennial Park Cemetery
- Military career
- Allegiance: Australia
- Branch: Australian Army
- Service years: 1918–1957
- Rank: Major General
- Service number: 343 (VX12398)
- Conflicts: Second World War
- Awards: Commander of the Order of the British Empire; Distinguished Service Order

Major General Arthur Gillespie Wilson, CBE, DSO (29 September 1900 – 15 February 1982) was an Australian Army officer.

He was educated at North Sydney Boys High School (where he was a classmate of another future major general, Albert Hellstrom) and the Royal Military College, Duntroon.

Wilson was awarded a Distinguished Service Order on 6 March 1947 for his services during the Second World War. He was appointed to the British Commonwealth Occupation Force in Japan. He was appointed a Commander of the Order of the British Empire in the 1955 New Year Honours.
