= Richard Conti =

Former judge of the Federal Court of Australia (1937-2016)

Richard Alan Conti QC (1937-2016) was a Judge of the Federal Court of Australia from August 2000 until his retirement in August 2007.

== Early life and background ==
Richard "Dick" Conti, QC was second of four children to Edwin Harold Davidson Conti, who worked in insurance, and Dorothy Elizabeth Conti (née Pritchard). He was born in 1937 and grew up on the North Shore during the war years. He attended North Sydney Boys High School, played cricket for Lindfield and Roseville and rugby for Gordon. When his father died in 1960, Conti became the breadwinner for his mother and much younger brothers.

He studied at Sydney University Law School in the 1950s and did so part time for he was also working as an articled clerk at his uncle's firm Arthur Pritchard and Co.

Richard married Betsy Conti (née Cahill) in 1962 and had four children whom they raised in Manly.

Conti was greatly involved in his local and regional communities throughout his life. This included his interest in rugby league: he appeared against New South Wales Rugby League bosses John Quayle and Colin Love in 1985, successfully advocating to keep embattled club Western Suburbs Magpies in the competition. He was later appointed the chairman of the NSWRL Judiciary. The Conti's also had a 40-year association with the Tamworth district, when Richard purchased Mount View in 1974 and later Keringal and Yaraan. Both him and Betsy were greatly involved with the community at the nearby town of Bendemeer and owned the local pub for some of this time.

== Career ==
Following his studies he was admitted as a solicitor in 1960 and became a partner in the firm of Arthur Pritchard and Co. until 1967. He was admitted to the Bar in 1967 and joined the eleventh floor of Wentworth Chambers, where he remained until his appointment to the Bench. He was appointed to the position of a Queen's Counsel in 1977. On 15 August 2000 he was appointed as a judge of the Federal Court. In a 2005 case involving architectural drawings, Conti was criticised and his verdict overturned by an appeals court because of concerns that his views had prejudiced the case. However, on appeal, the High Court overturned the decision of the Full Federal Court and held that no reasonable apprehension of bias on the part of Justice Conti was established.

Since the beginning of his career, he engaged in a diverse practice of tax, trade practices, intellectual property and corporations law which took him to the Privy Council and many courts in Australia. He has been described as having had profound knowledge of the law, cross examining skills and acute sense of tactics, and absolute integrity. A motto of his was: "Barristers are briefed to fight their client's cause, not to fight each other." He supported and mentored many junior barristers, advising them: "Don’t try to learn all the law. Just know where to look for it".
