= George Vern Barnett =

Australian organist, choir master and accompanist

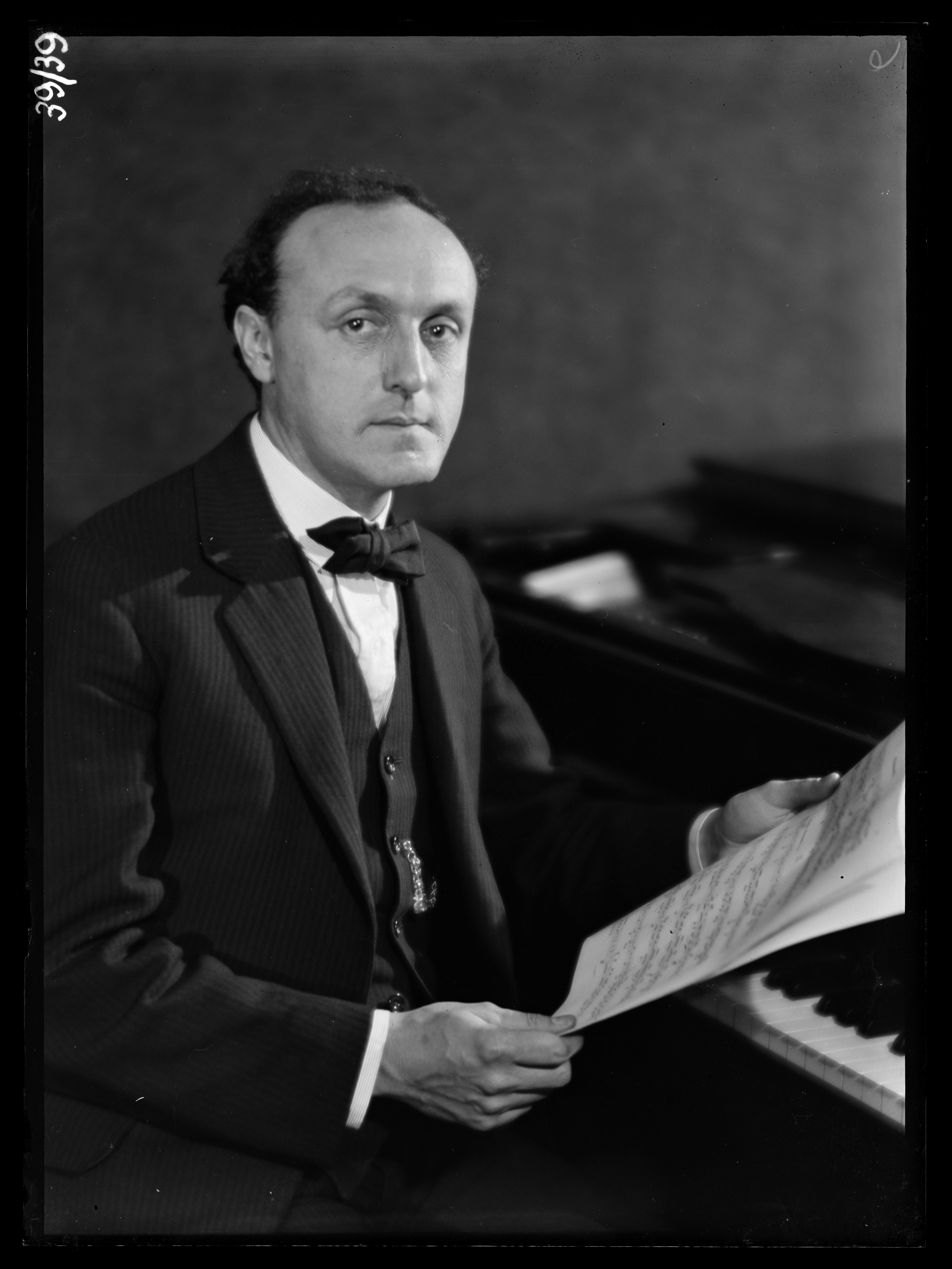
- George Vern Barnett, c. 1926, by H. P. Cazneaux
- Born: 31 January 1891; Carlton, Melbourne, Australia
- Died: 15 April 1946 (aged 55); Goulburn, New South Wales
- Occupations: organist, choir master
- Employer(s): St Stephen's Presbyterian Church, Macquarie Street, Sydney
- Known for: performances on the Sydney Town Hall Grand Organ; conductor Sydney Radio Choir
- Spouse: Doris Kathleen Trevor-Jones
- Parent(s): George and Margaret Vern Barnett

George Vern Barnett (31 January 1891 – 15 April 1946) was an Australian organist, choir master and accompanist. He was an important figure in the musical and cultural life of Sydney for many years in the early twentieth century.

== Early life and career ==
Barnett, usually known as Vern, was born in Carlton, a suburb of Melbourne. He was the son of George Vern Barnett, a dental surgeon, and his wife Margaret Sophia (née Woodward). The Barnetts lived in England and India before moving to Sydney in 1897.

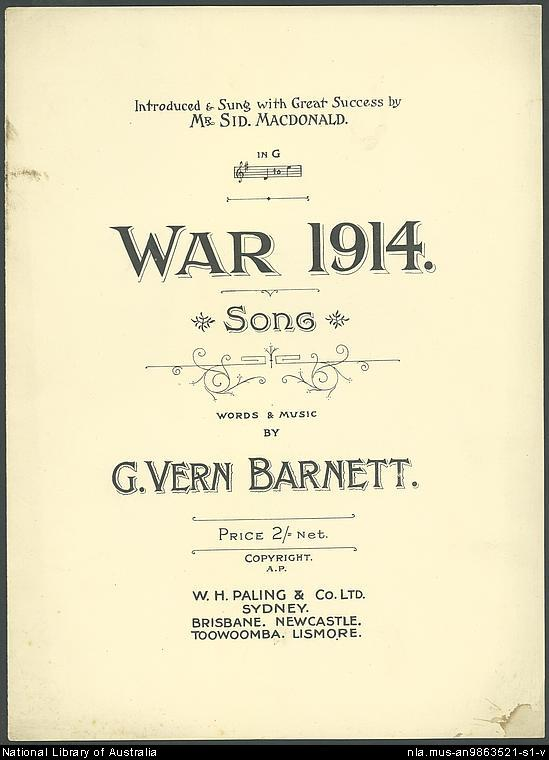
Sheet music to "War 1914"

Barnett studied music under Edward Sykes and Edward Goll and became prominent on the Sydney musical scene as "the boy wonder pianist". Due to poor health he was rejected for service in World War I, but expressed his patriotism by writing a popular song entitled "War 1914". He was choir master and organist at Sydney churches including Petersham Congregational Church (1913–1919), St Andrew's Summer Hill (1919–1922), and St Peter's Neutral Bay (1922–1932) and gave performances on the Sydney Town Hall Grand Organ from the age of eighteen.

As an organist, Barnett was held in the highest regard. His expertise was such that he was often asked to advise on and test new and rebuilt organs throughout New South Wales. He was organist and choirmaster at the new St Stephen's Presbyterian Church, Macquarie Street, Sydney, following its reconstruction in 1932. It was considered that he had one of the best libraries of organ music in Australia, which after his death was donated to the Organ Music Society of Sydney.

Barnett was also celebrated as an accompanist. He worked with many great overseas and local artists including Andrew Black, Henri Verbrugghen, Florence Austral, Elsa Stralia, Lillian Nordica, John McCormack and Dame Nellie Melba. Melba was so impressed that she wanted him to go back to England as her permanent accompanist, but he preferred to stay in Australia. Newspaper reviewers frequently made special note of his contribution to performances with comments such as "a great deal of the success of the performance was due to the fine work of G. Vern Barnett at the piano" and "Mr G. Vern Barnett likewise did his part of the work with consummate taste and feeling, and gave the requisite help to the melodies without any attempt to secure undue prominence for himself, although his accomplishments in this capacity are undeniable."

In the 1920s, Barnett embraced the new medium of radio, becoming the official pianist at radio station 2BL in 1925 and the station's musical director from 1927. In 1932, on the formation of the Australian Broadcasting Commission (ABC), the station became part of their network, and Barnett also became leader of the Broadcasters Instrumental Trio and director of the Broadcasters Dinner Orchestra. He continued as musical adviser and performer after relinquishing the musical director post in 1936.

== Later years ==
G. Vern Barnett

In 1932 under the auspices of the ABC, Barnett established the Sydney Radio Choir and remained its conductor for six years. This arose from the decision to perform on national radio Constant Lambert's choral work The Rio Grande. Within a week he succeeded in collecting some 80 singers, from whom 60 were selected. Under his baton the Sydney Radio Choir went on to give the first performances in Australia of works by composers such as Percy Grainger, Sir Granville Bantock, Gustav Holst and Sir Charles Villiers Stanford. Other successful performances of major works were settings of the Stabat Mater by Rossini and Pergolesi, Gounod's Gallia, An Australian Symphony by Lindley Evans and the first performance of Alfred Hill's setting of Psalm 3.

Barnett was deputy conductor of the Royal Philharmonic Society of Sydney from 1915 to 1926 and 1936 to 1939, and conductor from 1939 to 1946. He also prepared choirs for visiting conductors such as Sir Malcolm Sargent, Sir Hamilton Harty, and Sir Richard Runciman Terry. Sargent in particular expressed his appreciation and admiration for Barnett's preparation of a 250-voice choir in three weeks for a performance of Verdi's Requiem in 1936. The choristers were drawn from the Sydney Radio Choir, Conservatorium Select Choir, Royal Philharmonic Society, Sydney Male Choir and Hurlstone Park Choral Society. Sargent considered the choir "very fine indeed", adding that "I would be glad to have it at my disposal in any part of the world."'

Throughout his career, Barnett was invited to adjudicate at vocal and choral competitions and eisteddfods around Australia and New Zealand, including the prestigious The Sun Aria competition. He also taught piano and voice at the Sydney Conservatorium of Music for many years, and was at various times pianist of the Royal Apollo Club, organist and accompanist of the Welsh Choral Society, the Madrigal Society, and the Presbyterian Combined Choirs.

Barnett married Doris Kathleen Trevor-Jones (née Gartrell) on 20 October 1920. They had three children, Andrew, Brian and Judith, and lived in Chatswood on Sydney's North Shore. Barnett died suddenly on 15 April 1946 in Goulburn, New South Wales, where he had just completed adjudicating at the Goulburn Eisteddfod. His widow was also a pianist, music teacher and in her younger days a performer. She was the musical director of the Chatswood-Artarmon Music Club in the late 1940s and early 1950s. She died in 1987.

== Tribute ==
Following his death at the age of 55 a memorial concert was organised by the Sydney musical community in Barnett's honour in Sydney Town Hall. On that occasion one of many tributes came from Australia's first woman architect Florence Taylor CBE: "He was the greatest contributor to life I have ever known. He never counted the cost in his services to mankind."
