= Adrian d'Hagé =

Australian military officer and novelist

- Born: circa 1946; Sydney, New South Wales
- Military career
- Allegiance: Australia
- Branch: Australian Army
- Service years: 1964–2000
- Rank: Brigadier
- Commands: 6th Battalion, Royal Australian Regiment (1984–85)
- Conflicts: Vietnam War
- Awards: Member of the Order of Australia; Military Cross
- Other work: Novelist

Brigadier Adrian Stuart d'Hagé, AM, MC is a former Australian military officer and a novelist.

== Military career ==
d'Hagé was born in Sydney, New South Wales, and educated at North Sydney Boys High School and the Royal Military College, Duntroon. He graduated into the Australian Army Intelligence Corps in 1967, and was later transferred to Infantry and served in Vietnam as a platoon commander, where he was awarded the Military Cross. His service in the Australian Army included command of the 6th Battalion, Royal Australian Regiment and appointment as Director of Joint Operations for Defence. In 1980 he was awarded the National Medal. In 1990 he was promoted to brigadier as Head of Defence Public Relations.

In 1993 d'Hagé was made a Member of the Order of Australia in recognition of service to the army and the Defence Force in the fields of operational planning and public information. His last appointment was Head of Defence Planning for security of the 2000 Sydney Olympics, including defence against chemical, biological, radiological and nuclear threats (CBRN).

== Later career ==
In October 2000 d'Hagé left the army to pursue a writing career, moving to Italy to complete The Omega Scroll, a fictional thriller centred on the Catholic Church. He holds an honours degree in theology. He began his studies believing in Christianity and graduated with "no fixed religion." He has a Bachelor of Applied Science (Dean's Award) in oenology from Charles Sturt University.

On 13 July 2016, d'Hage graduated from the Australian National University with a Doctor of Philosophy on 'The Christian Right in American Politics and Support for Israel'.

== Novels ==
- The Omega Scroll (2006, Penguin: ISBN 9780143003236)
- The Beijing Conspiracy (2008)
- The Maya Codex (2011)
- The Inca Prophecy (2012)
- The Alexandria Connection (2014)
- The Russian Affair (2018)
