= Sydney University Regiment =

Australian Army Reserve officer training unit

- Cap badge of the Sydney University Regiment
- Active: 1900 – present
- Country: Australia
- Branch: Army Reserve
- Type: Officer training
- Role: Army Reserve officer training
- Size: Regiment
- Part of: 8 Brigade
- Garrison/HQ: Sydney (Holsworthy)
- Colours: Blue & gold and black & red
- March: Men of Harlech
- Anniversaries: 17 November 1900

Commanders
- Honorary Colonel: General David Hurley

Insignia
- Unit colour patch

Sydney University Regiment (SUR) is an officer-training regiment of the Australian Army Reserve. Its predecessor, the University Volunteer Rifle Corps, was raised in 1900 as a unit of the colonial New South Wales Defence Force. During the 20th century, several changes of name and role occurred. Sydney University Regiment is headquartered in Holsworthy Barracks and has detachments in Sydney, Canberra and Wollongong.

== History ==
=== Early years ===
The University Volunteer Rifle Corps (UVRC) was raised on 17 November 1900, as part of the colonial military forces of New South Wales. The University of Sydney was the colony's only university at the time, and two of its professors, T. W. Edgeworth-David and J. T. Wilson. VD, a former officer of the East Surrey Regiment, and employed as a teacher of physics at the university, encouraged the formation of a volunteer military unit.

Military training commenced in early 1901 with one hundred volunteers. The volunteers held their first parade in uniform later that year, when visited by the Duke of York, later to become George V. The UVRC appeared in public for the first time at a review ceremony in Centennial Park on the occasion of the coronation of Edward VII.

In 1903, the UVRC changed its name to the Sydney University Scouts (SUS) and the establishment had by then doubled to two rifle companies. When "universal" boyhood conscription was introduced in 1911, the Scouts' numbers increased, since all eligible undergraduates of the university were drafted into it and it became a militia battalion. At this time it also became responsible for the training of boy soldiers, the forerunner of today's Australian Cadet Corps, during their attendance at camps.

=== World War I ===
On the outbreak of the World War I, over sixty percent of the Scouts enlisted in the Australian Imperial Force (AIF). Members of the Scouts served widely within the AIF. In mid-1918 a university company was recruited from students at the University of Sydney for active service in the AIF. The war ended before it mobilised for service.

=== 1920s ===
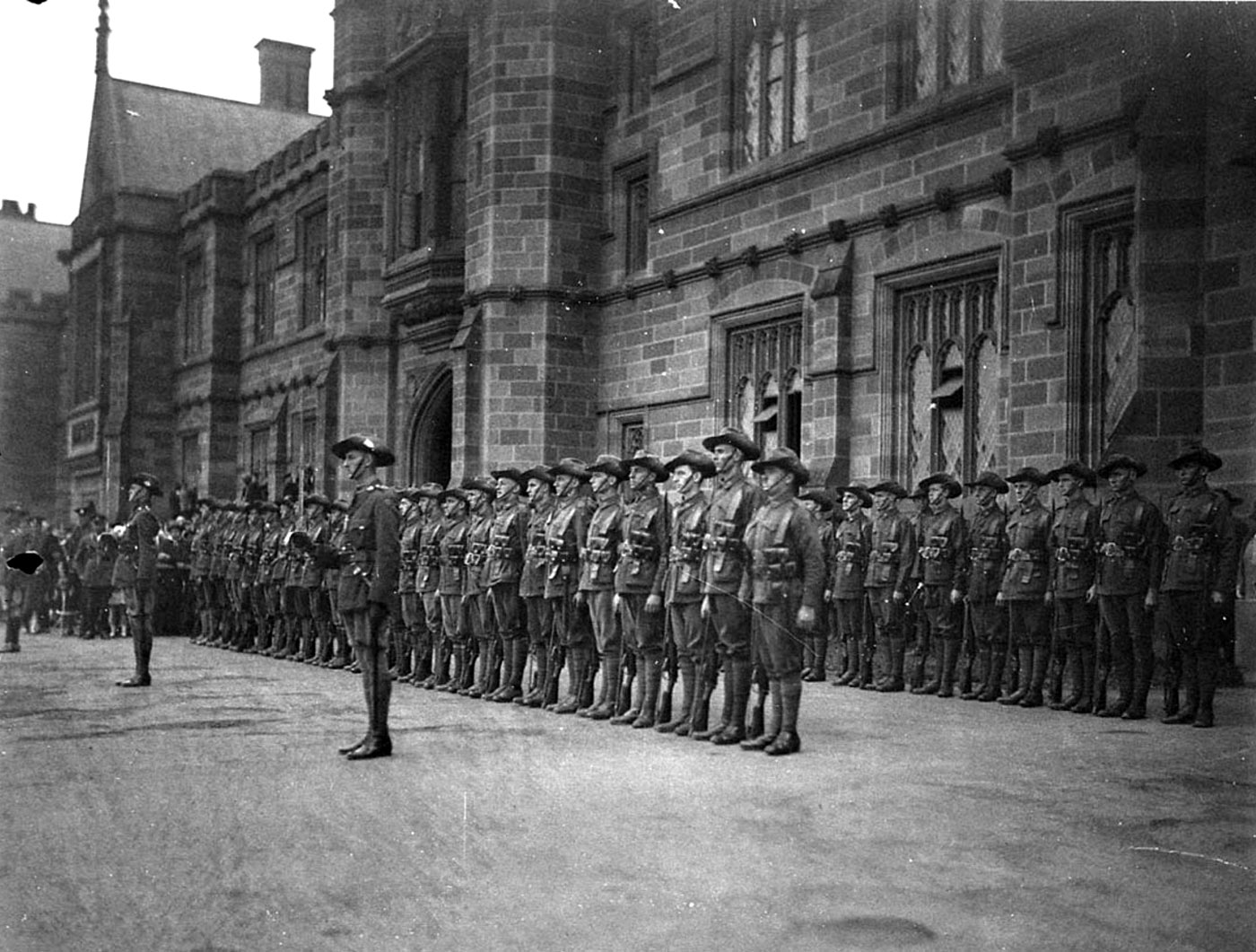
The Sydney University Regiment forms a guard of honour at the University of Sydney for the visiting Duke of York, 1927.

A regimental band of pipes and drums was formed in 1925. In 1927 the University Scouts were renamed the Sydney University Regiment (SUR). In recognition of its members' service in the Great War, Lieutenant-General Sir Harry Chauvel presented the regiment with its first King's and regimental colours. A display was presented by the regiment's artillery unit.

In 1929, King George V approved the SUR's affiliation with the 60th Regiment, The King's Royal Rifle Corps (KRRC) and consequently the regiment's embellishments and badges of rank became black with a red felt backing. These distinctive arrangements continue and are unique in the Australian Army. This alliance was maintained with The Royal Green Jackets of the British Army, the successor regiment to the KRRC until its amalgamation.

=== World War II ===
The regiment per se was not mobilised; but, as in the World War I, many serving and former members of the SUR enlisted in the Second AIF and served with distinction in all theatres of war. A notable example was Sir Arthur Roden Cutler, who had enlisted in the SUR Transport Platoon in 1936. He enlisted in the Second AIF and was awarded the Victoria Cross on 28 November 1941 "for most conspicuous and sustained gallantry, and for outstanding bravery from 19th June to 16th July in Syria."

Two other officers, Brigadier (later, Major General Sir) Victor Windeyer and Brigadier (later, Major General Sir) Ivan Dougherty distinguished themselves in battalion and brigade commands in the Near-East and the Pacific, prior to returning successfully to civilian life.

=== 1960s ===
In 1960, the regiment's campus HQ was destroyed by fire. (The regiment was subsequently rehoused at a new facility on university-owned land at Darlington.)

National Service (conscription of 20-year-olds by ballot) was introduced by the Menzies government in November 1964 and operated until December 1972. During this period, the regiment provided an alternative form of military service for university students. SUR during this period consisted of four rifle companies, a recruit-training company and an HQ and support company. The support company provided mortar, signal, pioneer and transport platoons. This was a period of increasing student activism and, in particular, protests against conscription and Australia's participation in the Vietnam War. In May 1969, protesting students confronted a guard of honour for Sir Roden Cutler VC, who was honorary colonel of the regiment and governor of NSW.

=== 1990s ===
The regiment received new colours in 1994, from the state governor, Rear Admiral Peter Sinclair. In 1997, the regiment came under command of the Royal Military College, Duntroon, tasked with conducting training that prepares part-time officer cadets for their final attendance at the college.

=== Today ===
The Sydney University Regiment provides a series of training block (TB) courses to qualify officer cadets to graduate from the Royal Military College - Duntroon as a lieutenant in the Australian Army Reserve. An officer cadet must complete a total of five training blocks to graduate. In between training blocks officer cadets undertake a range of other training on Tuesday nights and over weekends. Officer cadets are also required to undertake fitness training in their personal time to meet the conditioning required for military courses.

Sydney University Regiment also provides the opportunity for trainees to elect to undertake their Army Reserve Officer Training within a one-year time frame. Participants undertake their training block modules in close succession and then after graduation as a lieutenant will move into an allocated Australian Regular Army unit for the remainder of a year long full-time contract. During this time they are provided with exposure to a range of military experiences that will enhance their future Army Reserve service. At the conclusion of the one-year period participants will be fully qualified and posted to an Army Reserve unit.

In June 2021, the Sydney University Regiment was referred to the Inspector-General of the Australian Defence Force (IGADF) by the Chief of Army, LTGEN Rick Burr, over concerns of a toxic culture at the regiment that saw widespread unacceptable behaviour, bullying, sexual harassment, illegal room searches, racial discrimination and other poor treatment of the cadets at the regiment by the regiment's training staff and commanders. Comcare, the federal work health and safety watchdog, also announced an investigation into the regiment's alleged abuse of its cadets. In July 2021, Senator Jacqui Lambie urged parents not to send their children to the regiment as they would not be safe at the Regiment. As of November 2021, the investigation is on going and is believed to be investigating complaints from over 50 cadets from the regiment.

== Notable graduates ==
Political

- The Hon. Gough Whitlam, AC, QC
- The Hon. John Aquilina, AM

Military

- Major General The Rt. Hon. Sir Victor Windeyer, KBE, CB, DSO & Bar, ED, QC
- Major General Sir Ivan Dougherty, CBE, DSO & Bar, ED
- Major General John Broadbent, CBE, DSO, ED
- Major General Paul Cullen, AC, CBE, DSO & Bar, ED
- Major General The Hon. Paul Brereton, AM, RFD
- Brigadier Sir Frederick Chilton, CBE, DSO & Bar
- Brigadier The Hon. Max Willis, RFD, ED
- Captain The Hon. Peter Collins, AM, RFD, QC, RANR
- Professor Major Errol Solomon Meyers
- Lieutenant Sir Roden Cutler, VC, AK, KCMG, KCVO, CBE

Other

- Sir Douglas Mawson, OBE, FRS, FAA
- Sir Errol Knox, MBE
- Alexander Boden, AO, FAA
- Justice Roderick Howie, QC
- W A (Tiger) O'Reilly

== See also ==
- Officers' Training Corps (UK equivalent)
- Reserve Officers' Training Corps (US equivalent)
