= Noel Beadle =

Australian botanist and plant ecologist

Noel Charles William Beadle
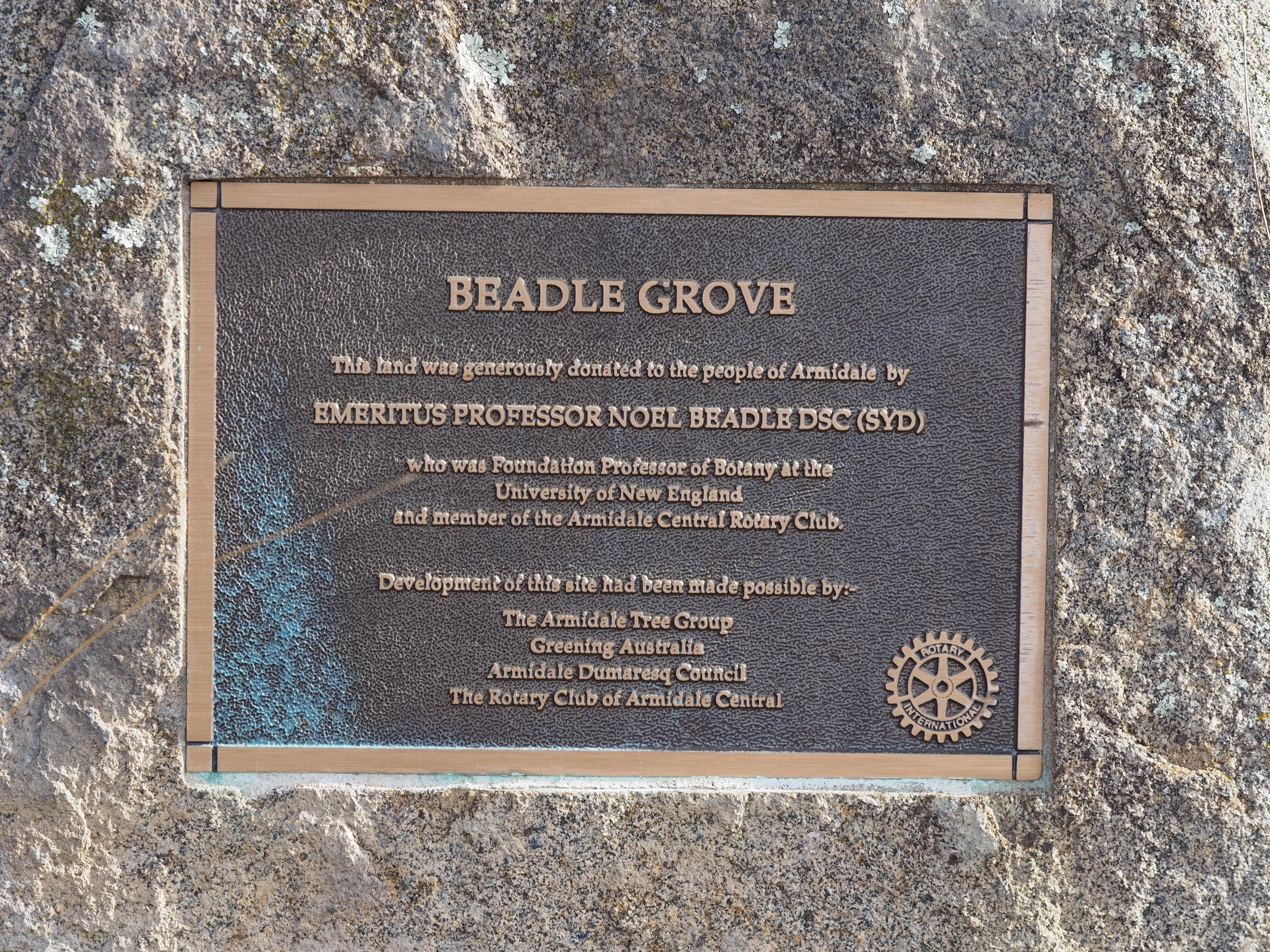
- Memorial to N.C.W. Beadle
- Born: 20 December 1914; Sydney, New South Wales
- Died: 31 October 1998 (aged 83); Armidale, New South Wales
- Education: Sydney University
- Scientific career
- Fields: botany
- Workplaces: University of New England
- Author abbrev. (botany): N.C.W.Beadle

Noel Charles William Beadle (20 December 1914 – 13 October 1998) was an Australian botanist and plant ecologist who spent most of his working life at the University of New England in Armidale.

== Early life ==
Noel Beadle was born in Sydney to parents Emma and Arthur Beadle and spent his early life in the suburb of Chatswood. Living close to bushland, he enjoyed exploring the bush. He developed an appreciation for horticulture in his boyhood, learning the Latin names of plants from his horticulturally trained father.

== Education ==
Beadle was educated at North Sydney Boys’ High School. He then attended the University of Sydney, studying chemistry with the aim of becoming an industrial chemist. Botany was an elective subject that captured Beadle’s imagination. It led to studying the biochemistry of tomatoes both in his honours year and in the Master of Science degree that followed.

== Career ==
Employed as a demonstrator in the University of Sydney’s Department of Botany, Beadle was recruited for a plant collecting trip organised by the Linnean Society of New South Wales in 1939. The trip collected botanical specimens from Broken Hill, Milparinka, Tibooburra, Wanaaring and Bourke. Beadle gained experience in drying, pressing and identifying plant specimens from the trip. This led to his employment as a research officer and botanist with the Soil Conservation Service, a newly-established New South Wales Government agency, in late 1939. Based in Condobolin, Beadle was commissioned to conduct a soil survey of the region. This project evolved into a detailed survey of the vegetation of the western region, resulting in the publication of Beadle’s map, Vegetation Map of Western New South Wales. The Soil Conservation Service published Beadle’s report in 1948.

In 1946, Beadle left the Soil Conservation Service to begin teaching botany at the University of Sydney. Having reached the position of senior lecturer there, he was appointed Foundation Professor of Botany at the University of New England in late 1954. This position he held until his retirement in 1979. Beadle was appointed Emeritus Professor at the University of New England in 1980, and was elected a Fellow of the University in 1993.

== Death ==
Beadle died at Armidale Hospital on 13 October 1998, aged 83. Beadle’s funeral service was held at St Mark’s Chapel at the University of New England on 16 October 1998. He was interred at Armidale City Lawn Cemetery.

== Legacy ==
A large block of land that Beadle donated to Armidale City Council, now Armidale Regional Council, is named Beadle Grove in his honour. It is a public park that contains native plants representative of that region.

The NCW Beadle Herbarium at the University of New England is a research collection of approximately 100,000 vascular plant specimens.

Grevillea beadleana was named in honour of Beadle by Donald McGillivray.

== Awards ==
- Royal Society of New South Wales, 1982 Clarke Medal
- Ecological Society of Australia, 1985 medal
- Soil Conservation Service (NSW), 1988 50th Centenary Award

== Works ==
=== Books ===
- Beadle, N. C. W. (1948). The Vegetation and Pastures of Western New South Wales, with Special Reference to Soil Erosion. New South Wales Soil Conservation Service, Sydney.
- Beadle, N. C. W., Carolin, R. C., and Evans, O. D (1962). Handbook of the Vascular Plants of the Sydney District and Blue Mountains. Brown Gem Print, Armidale.
- Beadle, N. C. W. (1981). The Vegetation of Australia. Cambridge University Press, Cambridge.
- Beadle, N. C. W., Carolin, R. C., and Evans, O. D. (1986 [1972]). Flora of the Sydney Region. Reed, Frenchs Forest.
- Beadle, N. C. W. (1989 [1971-1987]). Students Flora of North Eastern New South Wales. University of New England Dept. of Botany, Armidale. 6 vols.
- Beadle, N. C. W. (White, Gordon J., editor) (1995). Botany in the Backblocks: From 1939. University of New England Dept. of Botany, Armidale.

=== Maps ===
- Beadle, N. C. W. (1945). Vegetation Map of Western New South Wales. New South Wales Soil Conservation Service, Sydney.

== See also ==
- Clarke Medal
- List of Old Falconians

Awards
Preceded by W. Stephenson	Clarke Medal; 1982	Succeeded by Keith Crook
