= Robert Clancy (doctor) =

Australian immunologist

Robert Llewellyn Clancy AM is an Australian clinical immunologist in the field of mucosal immunology. He is known for his research and development of therapies for chronic obstructive pulmonary disease (COPD), commonly known as emphysema. In his role as senior clinical immunologist he overseas the assessment of immune disorders. Clancy developed the vaccine Broncostat at the University of Newcastle in 1985. He co-authored the 2025 book "Covid Through Our Eyes".

Clancy is an emeritus professor at the University of Newcastle's School of Biomedical Sciences and Pharmacy. He was previously Foundation Chair of Pathology at the University of Newcastle. Earlier in his career he was the first clinical immunologist at the Royal Prince Alfred Hospital, Sydney. He was educated at North Sydney Boys High School. He holds a BS.Med (Hons) and a MBBS (Hons) from the University of Sydney and a PhD from Monash University. He is a fellow of the Royal Australasian College of Physicians (FRACP) and the Royal College of Pathologists of Australia (FRCPA). He was admitted as a Member of the Order of Australia (AM, Order of Australia) in 2005 for service to cartography as a collector of early maps of Australia and to the field of immunology. As a senior clinical immunologist he assesses immune disorders at The University of Newcastle.

During the COVID-19 pandemic Clancy was involved in controversy when he was quoted by Australian MP Craig Kelly in support of unverified information about claimed benefits of the drugs hydroxychloroquine and ivermectin. Newcastle University issued a statement in which it distanced itself from Clancy's views, mentioning also that the vice-chancellor had said the university did "not consider Robert Clancy a subject matter expert on COVID-19".

On November 16, 2022 he claimed in "Quadrant" (The Problem with the COVID Narrative) that the medical establishment had ignored the importance of the mucosal immune response to COVID-19 in favour of a high risk focus on stimulating systemic immunity by means of an experimental genetic treatment.
