= North Sydney Boys High School =

North Sydney Boys' High School

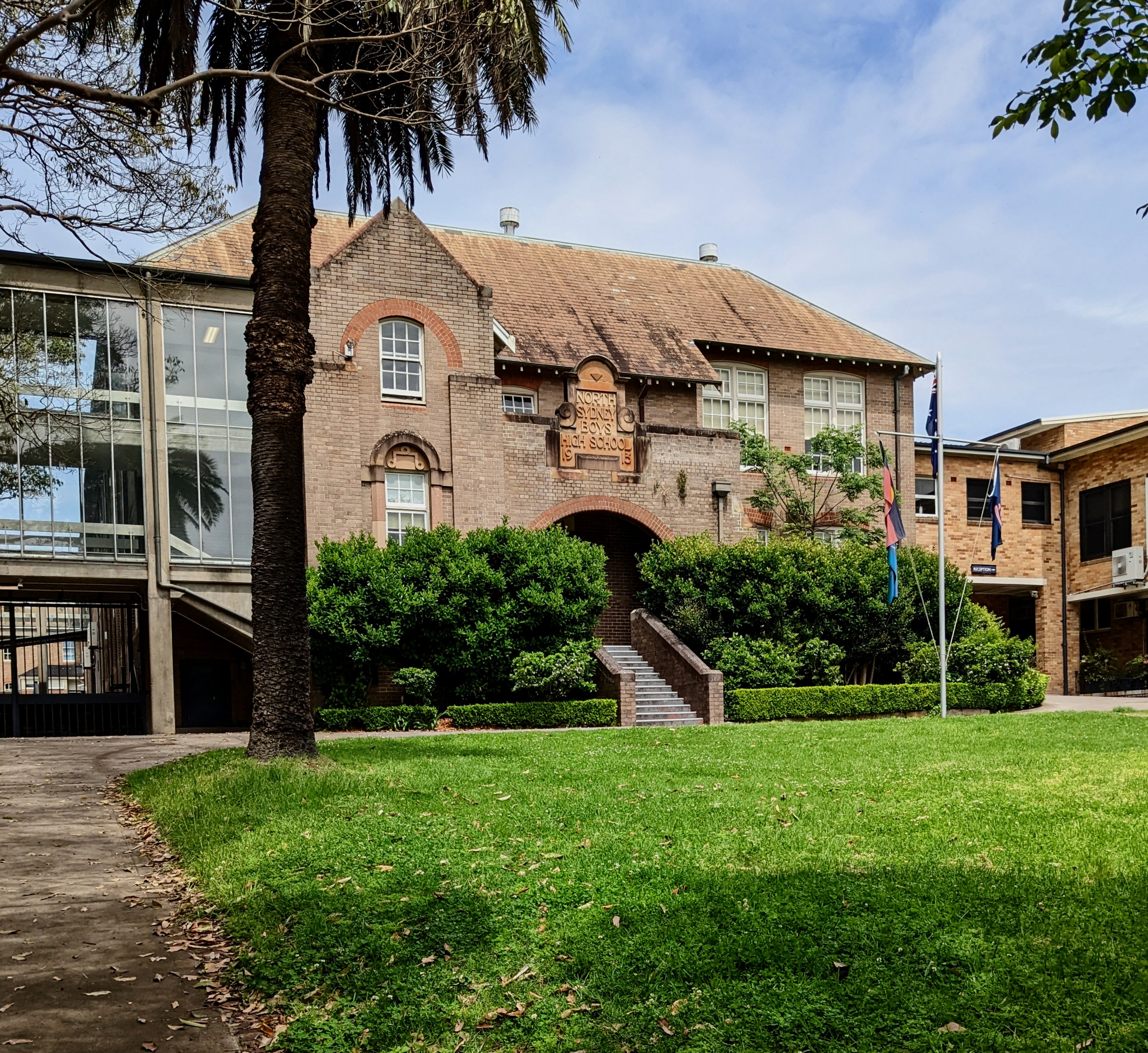
- North Sydney Boys' High School front entrance

Location
- 127 Falcon Street, Crows Nest, Lower North Shore, Sydney; Australia; 33°49′46″S 151°12′27″E

Information
- Type: Government-funded, single-sex, academically selective secondary day school
- Motto: Latin: Vincit qui se vincit (He conquers who conquers himself)
- Established: 1912; 114 years ago
- Sister school: North Sydney Girls' High School
- Principal: Brian Ferguson
- Teaching staff: 66 (2025)
- Years: 7–12
- Gender: Male
- Enrolment: 933 (2025)
- Campus type: Suburban
- Colours: Bismark, coral and gold
- Mascot: Don the Falcon
- Alumni: Old Falconians
- Website: northsydbo-h.schools.nsw.gov.au

North Sydney Boys' High School (abbreviated as NSBHS or NSB) is a government-funded, single-sex, academically selective secondary day school for boys, located at North Sydney, on the Lower North Shore of Sydney, New South Wales, Australia. Since 2023, North Sydney Boys' High School has ranked 1st in the state based on HSC results, overtaking James Ruse Agricultural High School which had held the position since 1996. In 2025, approximately 95% of the student population came from a language background other than English. The school has an Index of Community Socio-Educational Advantage (ICESA) of 1195, with the school sitting in the 99th percentile compared to the national average of 1000.

== History ==
North Sydney Boys' began off-site in temporary classes in 1912, as North Sydney Intermediate High School, which was located in Blue Street. At the beginning of 1915, the new school on the corner of Falcon Street and Miller Street, Crows Nest was opened to 214 students. In 1932, the school subsequently chose the Falcon as its mascot, as well as its logo according to the location of the school on Falcon Street, the Old Boys' Union adopting the name Old Falconians' Union in 1933. After years of controversy in relation to the appropriate start date for the school, it was decided to celebrate the centenary in 2012.

The first headmaster was Nimrod Greenwood. He had been headmaster of the North Sydney Superior School before the establishment of the High School and had 33 years of service as Headmaster of the two schools. On his retirement in 1915, he was succeeded by Charles Rattray Smith who had founded Newcastle High School and was to go to head Sydney High School in 1918. Smith was succeeded by the headmaster who had replaced him at Newcastle High School, William Williams, who guided the school for the next 13 years. On his promotion to Inspector, Williams was succeeded by the then Headmaster of Newcastle Boys' High School, Robert F. Harvey, in 1932; Harvey was head until his death in 1947.

Following its closure in 1969, students from North Sydney Technical High School were transferred to NSBHS.

In 2010, a teacher at the school called for students to stop attending and over-relying on coaching services, due to a lack of attention in class stemming from "overconfidence" and ignoring topics taught in class, with the principal speaking out against this "ongoing" issue in school assemblies. Students were encouraged to engage in extra-curricular activities rather than a wholistic focus on academics.

In 2022, North Sydney Boys was one of the several schools that launched an investigation into student involvement in a private online Discord chatroom run by senior students at Knox Grammar School, with accounts linked to students by their student emails used to send "racist, anti-Semitic and homophobic videos, messages and rantings on violent misogyny".

In 2023, North Sydney Boys became the top HSC ranked school in NSW, surpassing James Ruse Agricultural High School, a position that it retained in 2024 and 2025.

== Academic Results ==
North Sydney Boys' has ranked within the top 5 schools in New South Wales by the percentage of examinations sat that achieved a distinguished achievers for the past decade. Additionally, the school regularly places within the third standard deviation against all Australian Students, as well as students from similar socio-economic backgrounds, in the National Assessment Program Literacy and Numeracy (NAPLAN) and Higher School Certificate (HSC) assessments.

=== HSC ===
The table below shows the school's HSC ranking relative to other schools in NSW.

Year	Ranking
2006	3
2007	2
2008	3
2009	2
2010	3
2011	2
2012	2
2013	4
2014	2
2015	4
2016	3
2017	3
2018	2
2019	3
2020	3
2021	2
2022	2
2023	1
2024	1
2025	1

== Crows Nest campus ==
The campus of North Sydney Boys' High School consists of a number of one- to three-storey buildings on an minimally irregular-shaped site over 2.53 hectares (6.3 acres) and situated on the southwestern corner of Falcon and Miller Streets, Crows Nest. It also borders residential and commercial retail properties on West Street and Falcon Street. There are a number of mature native and exotic trees with some shrubs. The built environment comprises classrooms, library, amenities, assembly hall, administration and gymnasium, various courtyards, playground areas, tennis courts, car parking, cricket practice nets and an open waste storage area.

=== History ===
Construction began on the first building on the Crows Nest campus in 1913 on contract by John Brown whose tender price was £7770 "on much the same lines" as North Sydney Girls' High School, whose construction was then underway. In August 1914, the Sydney Morning Herald reported that the "Girls' High School at North Sydney has been completed and occupied, while the buildings for the Boys' High School are being erected ... on the most modern lines, while the accommodation and fittings will be ample, and up to date." By the end of December 1914, Sydney Morning Herald could report that the "Boys' High School at North Sydney is being erected by day labour at an estimated cost of £7900. It consists of a two-story brick building, with stone facings, and provides eight classrooms and staff rooms. The science and manual training rooms are detached."

Around 1920, the site expanded and the Arts/TAS building dates from this time. The assembly hall (later named in honour of Arthur Henry) was completed in 1936. In 1959 a new library and administration block were erected. Between 1967 and 1969, science and classroom blocks were added. The gymnasium dates from 1962. A government grant totalling $50,000 (Adjusted for Inflation) was provided in 1980 by the NSW state, allowing for expansion of the TAS Facilities to undergo construction of a temporary food technology kitchen that has since undergone iterations of upgrades including the recent 2022-2023 complete renovation of the kitchen facilities. In more recent times, the school has undergone cosmetic upgrades through general usage classrooms in the school, alongside a newly installed gym within the John Treloar Gymnasium, and a series of outdoor court upgrades including a volleyball court and interchangeable outdoor basketball/tennis courts.

=== Recent building works ===
Under DA1, completed in about 2003, the Keele Street Lawn area was acquired and refurbished. In DA2, completed in 2005, new tennis courts and other building works were carried out. A new building, named J Block, that includes music rehearsal spaces, visual art classrooms and design and technology workshops was completed in 2006. A dedicated music computer lab is also available in the building.

The school community also completed a major upgrade of the AF Henry Hall in 2005, including the addition of a mezzanine, new ceiling, lighting, stage and stage curtains. In 2007–2009, six science labs were completely refurbished, costing over $1million.

In 2011, the school named the recently refurbished gymnasium in honour of Old Falconian John Treloar.

Construction of a new library was completed at the end of 2013, students having use if it from the start of 2014.

A completely parent and donation funded development of new outdoor tennis, basketball and futsal courts was completed and opened to students at the end of 2017. The project aimed to resolve shortages in adequate dedicated sporting facilities in the school, and replaced the worn out grass playing fields. Currently, requests have been made to increase the height of the fence surrounding the new facilities due to the frequency of sports equipment such as soccer balls clearing the fence ending up in the residencies adjacent.

Further refurbishment of the school gymnasium commenced in December 2019. The gymnasium was finished in 2020 and was made available in 2021 to students.

== Old Falconians ==
Former students of North Sydney Boys' High School are known as 'Old Boys' or 'Old Falconians' and may elect to join the schools' alumni association, known as the 'Old Falconians' Union' (OFU). The original Old Boys' Union, founded in 1917 and renamed the Old Falconians' Union in 1933, was created as a way to "promote goodwill fellowship amongst former students of and to provide financial and other support to the School". Old Falconians can join the official OFU website to stay connected with colleagues and the school.

In 2010 The Age reported that North Sydney Boys' High School alumni ranked equal seventh among Australian secondary school alumni based on the number of alumni who had received a "top" Order of Australia.

Sir Ralph Darling, Headmaster of Geelong High School, paid a tribute to the school in 1988 in the following terms: "... Melbourne High, North Sydney High, is just as good or better than any private school."

== Gallery ==
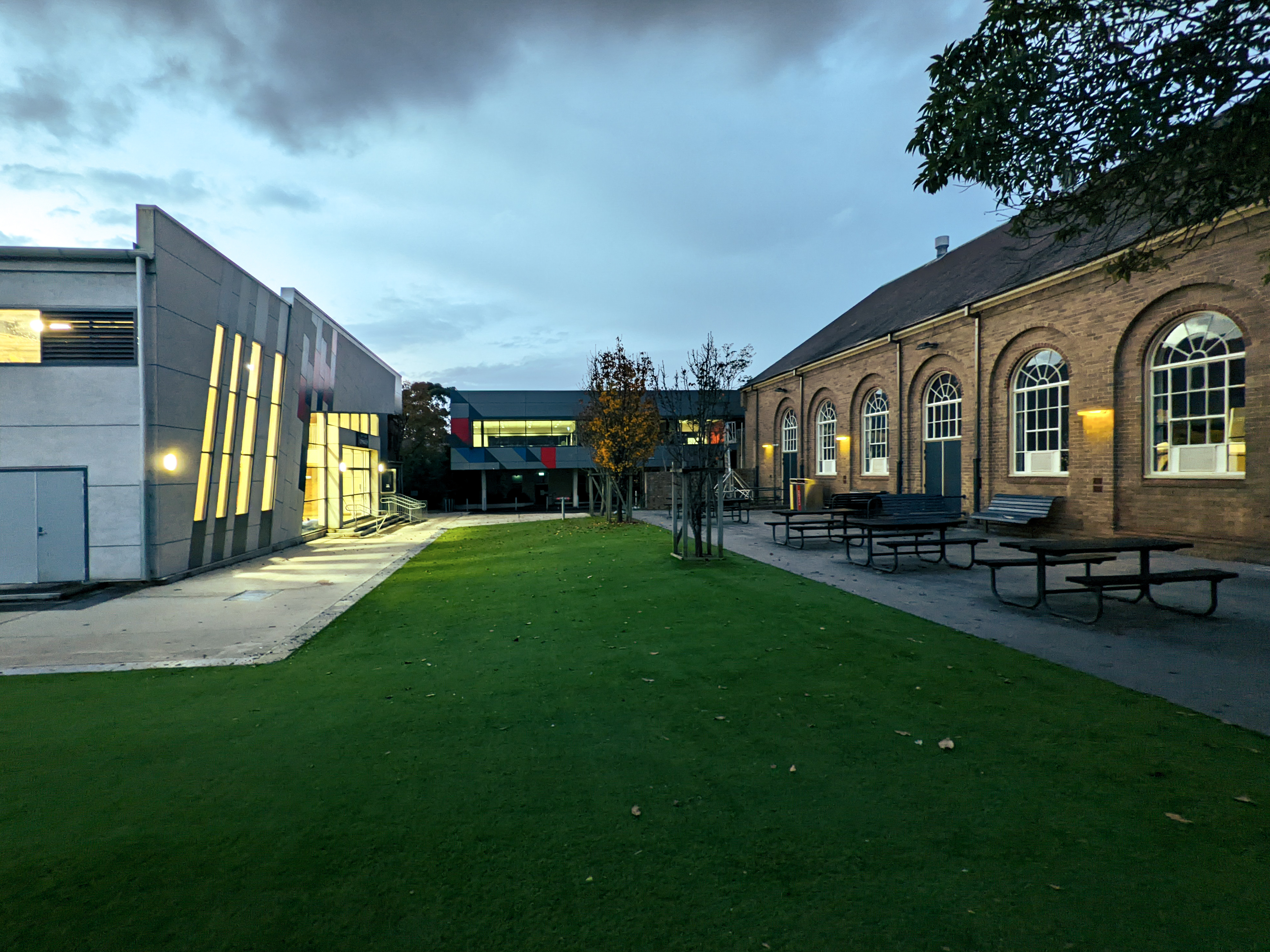
NSBHS Outdoor development

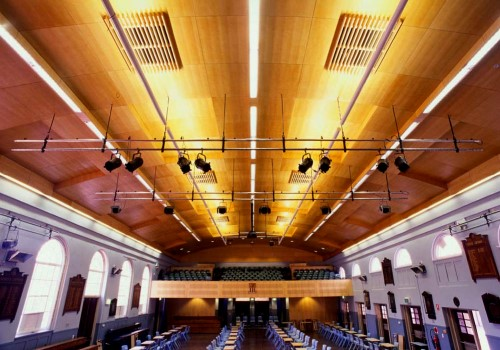
Interior of the AF Henry Hall

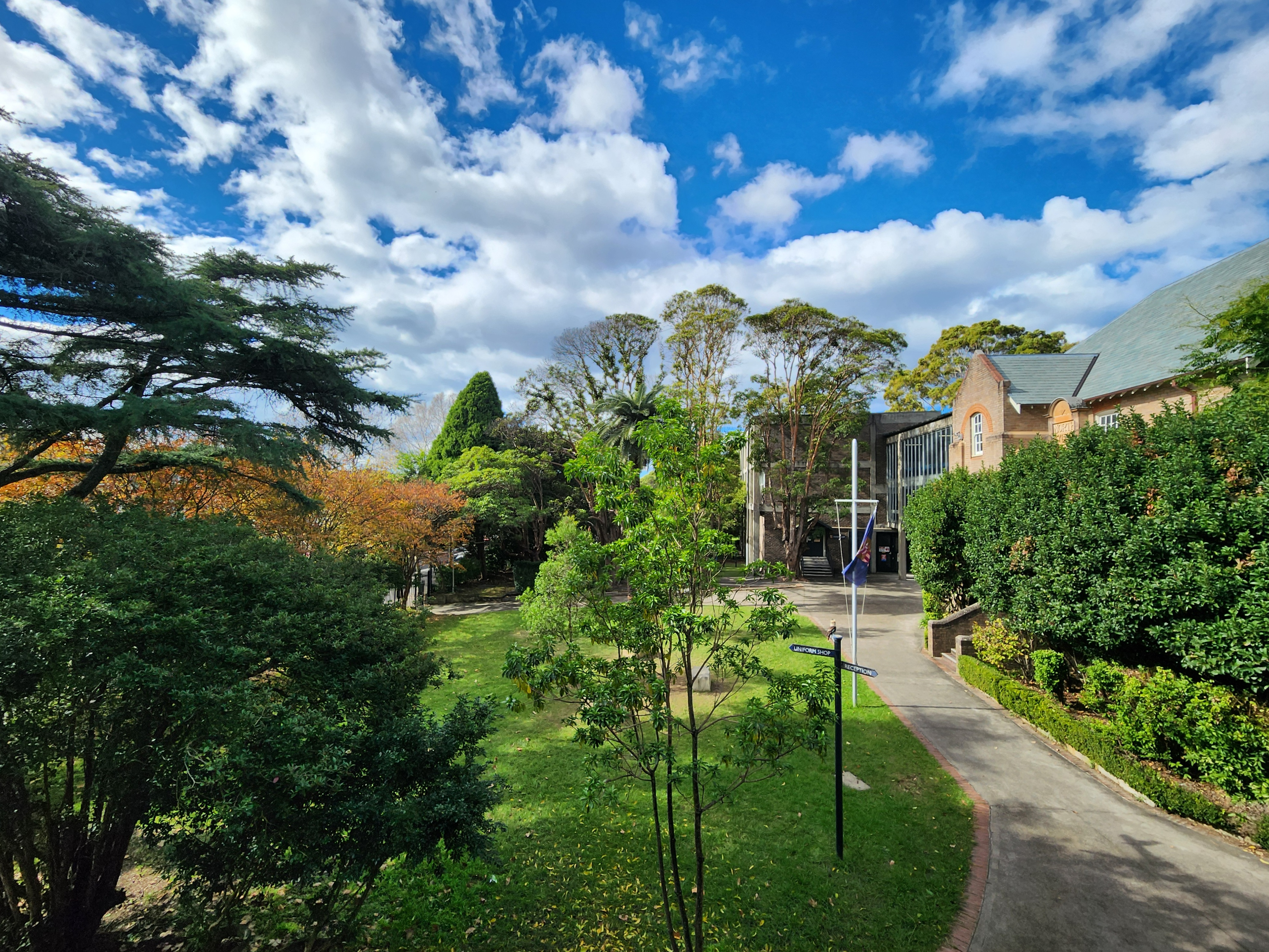
NSBHS Miller St Lawn

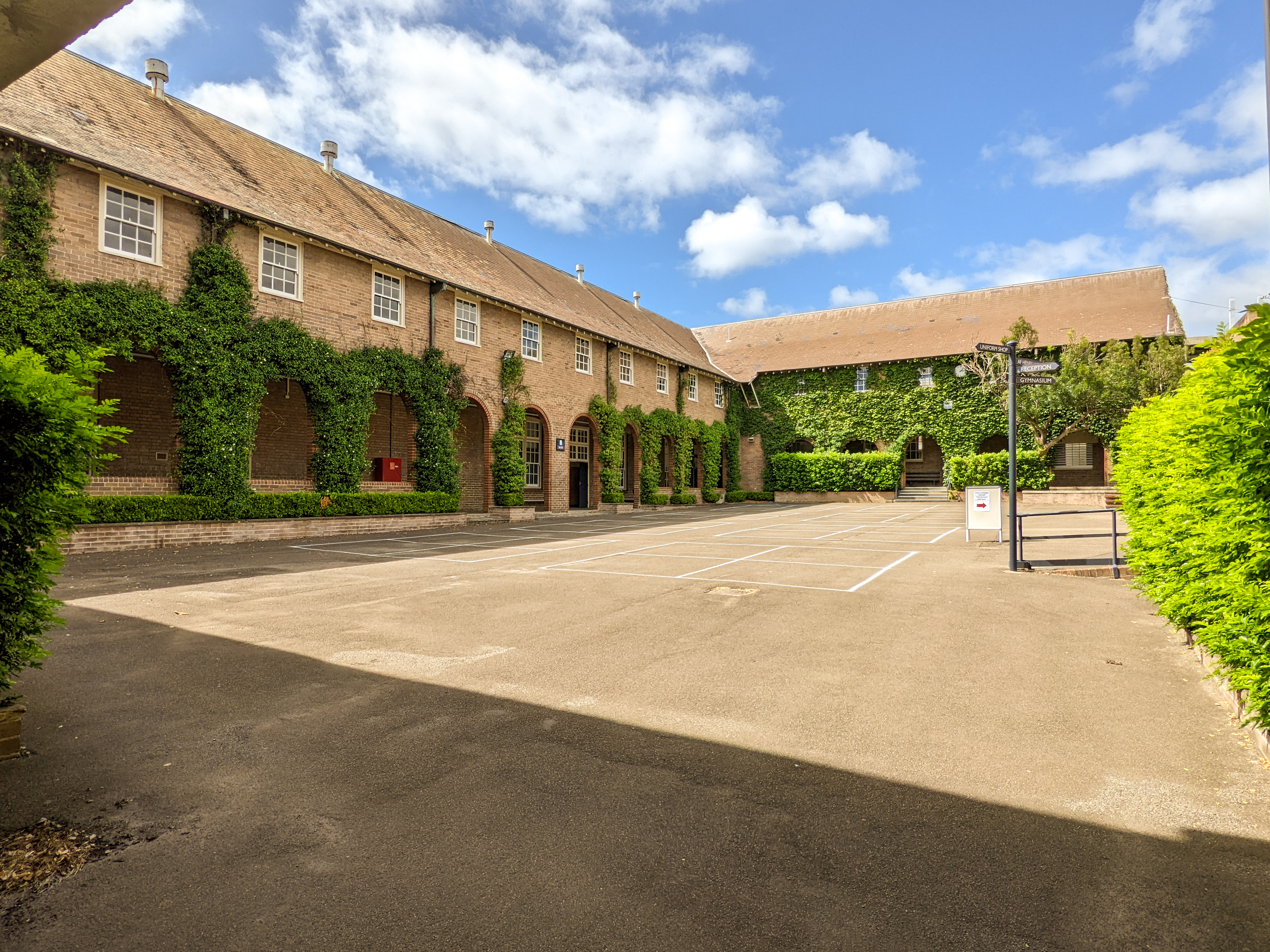
NSBHS B Quad

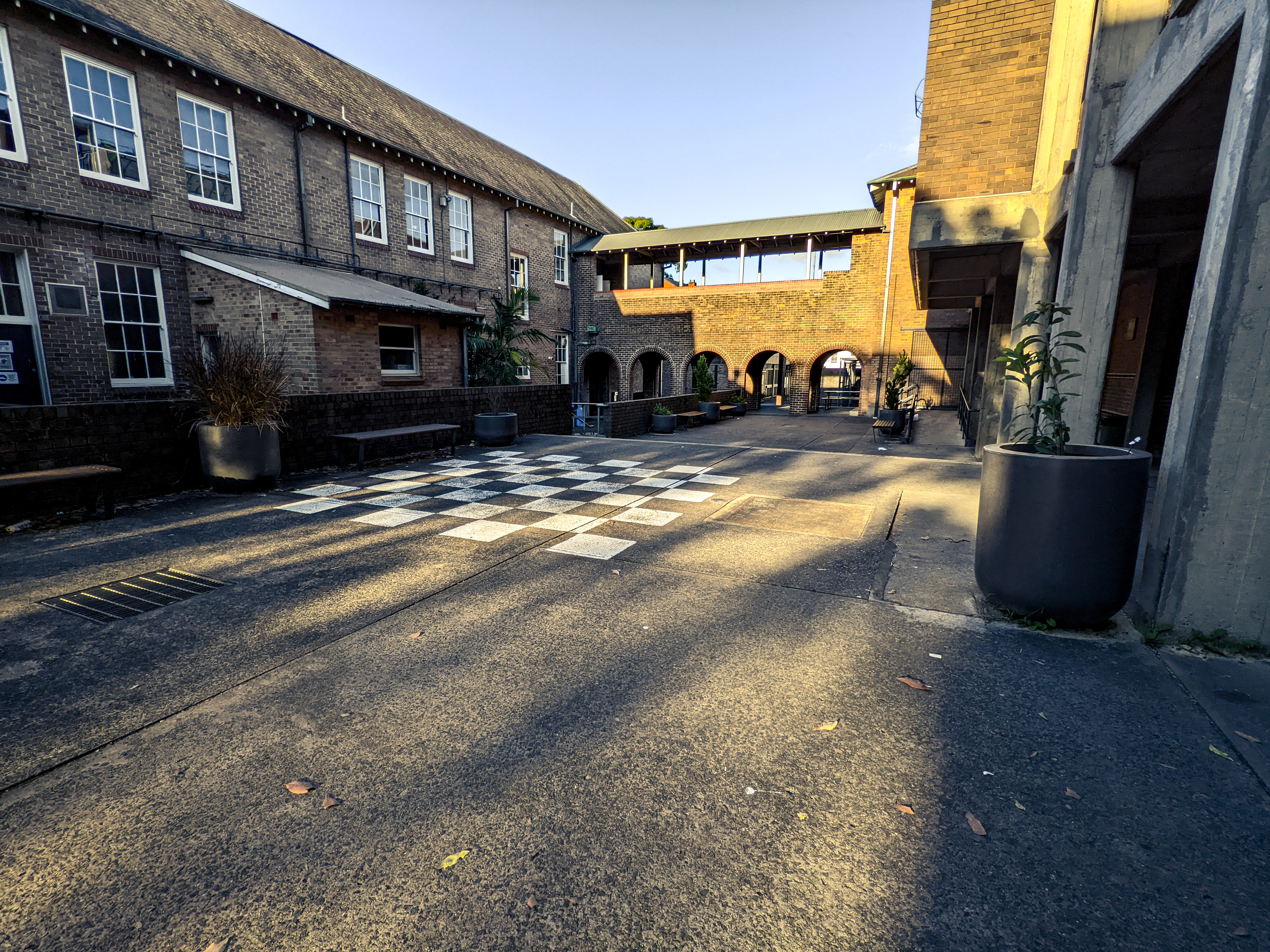
NSBHS Science Quad

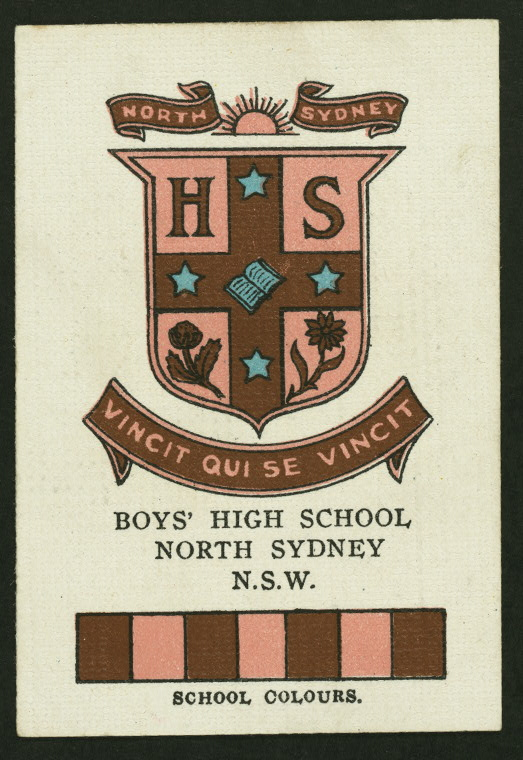
NSBHS cigarette card, c. 1920s

== See also ==
- North Sydney Girls High School
- List of government schools in New South Wales
- List of selective high schools in New South Wales

== Notes ==
- Who's Who of boys' school rankings: 1. North Sydney Boys High School, 2.Melbourne Grammar School, 3. Melbourne High School, 4. Geelong Grammar School, 5. Sydney Boys High School, 6. Wesley College, 7. Shore, 8. Fort Street Boys' High, 9. The King's School, 10. Sydney Grammar School
