= List of ambassadors of Australia to Norway =

Ambassador of Australia to Norway

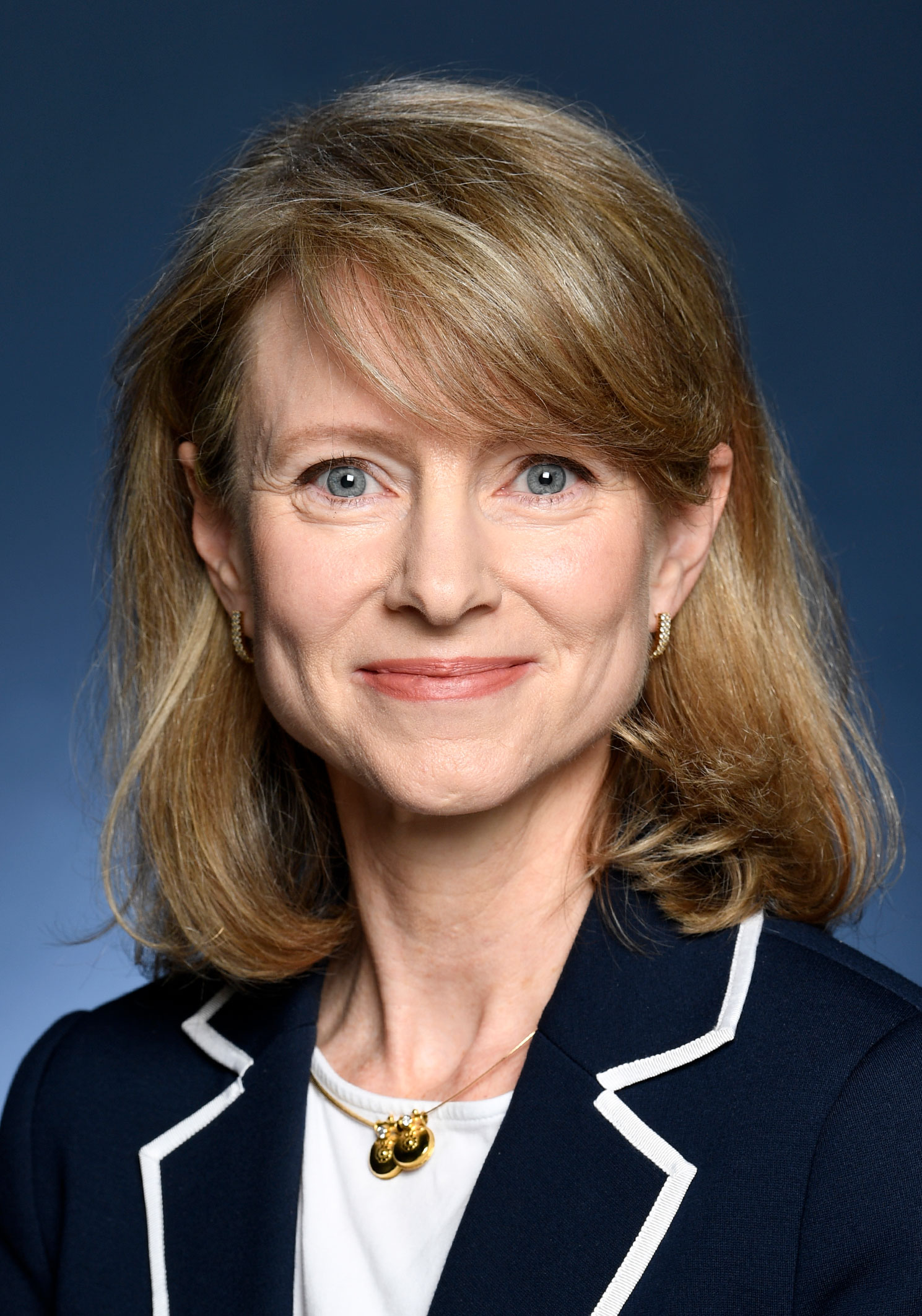
- Incumbent; Kerin Ayyalaraju since 4 August 2021
- Department of Foreign Affairs and Trade
- Style: Her Excellency
- Reports to: Minister for Foreign Affairs
- Seat: Copenhagen, Denmark
- Nominator: Prime Minister of Australia
- Appointer: Governor General of Australia
- Inaugural holder: Roy Peachey (Ambassador resident in Stockholm, Sweden)
- Formation: 1970
- Website: Australian Embassy, Norway

The Ambassador of Australia to Norway is an officer of the Australian Department of Foreign Affairs and Trade and the head of the Embassy of the Commonwealth of Australia to the Kingdom of Norway. The Ambassador resides in Copenhagen, Denmark. The current ambassador, since May 2017, is MaryEllen Miller.

== List of ambassadors ==
Ordinal	Officeholder	Residency	Term start date	Term end date	Time in office	Notes
1	Roy Peachey	Stockholm, Sweden	1970	May 1972	1–2 years	
2	John Petherbridge	Stockholm, Sweden	May 1972	September 1975	3 years, 4 months	
3	Lance Barnard	Stockholm, Sweden	September 1975	June 1978	2 years, 9 months	
4	Brian Hill	Stockholm, Sweden	June 1978	January 1980	1 year, 7 months	
5	Kevin Flanagan	Stockholm, Sweden	January 1980	December 1983	3 years, 11 months	
6	Judith P. Pead	Stockholm, Sweden	1997	January 1999	1–2 years	
7	Stephen Brady	Stockholm, Sweden	January 1999	January 2003	4 years	
8	Matthew Peek	Copenhagen, Denmark	2003	2006	2–3 years	
9	Sharyn Minahan	Copenhagen, Denmark	2006	2010	3–4 years	
10	James Choi	Copenhagen, Denmark	2010	2013	2–3 years	
11	Damien Miller	Copenhagen, Denmark	2013	May 2017	3–4 years	
12	MaryEllen Miller	Copenhagen, Denmark	May 2017	incumbent	9 years, 4 months	

== See also ==
- Australia–Norway relations
