= Brian Hill (diplomat) =

Australian diplomat (1919–1998)

- Born: Brian Clarence Hill; 24 October 1919
- Died: 7 May 1998 (aged 78)
- Education: Canberra University College
- Occupations: Public servant, diplomat

Brian Clarence Hill (24 October 1919 – 7 May 1998) was an Australian diplomat. He held senior diplomatic postings from the early 1950s through to the late 1970s, including as head of mission in Moscow (1953–1954), Ambassador to South Vietnam (1961–1964), Permanent Representative to the UN Office in Geneva (1964–1969), Ambassador to Egypt (1969–1972), High Commissioner to New Zealand (1974–1977), Ambassador to Ireland (1977–1978), and Ambassador to Sweden (1978–1980).

== Life and career ==
Hill was born on 24 October 1919. He began working for the Department of External Affairs in 1946. He had attended the School of Diplomatic Studies at Canberra University College.

In October 1953 Hill succeeded John McMillan as chargé d'affaires and head of mission in Moscow, in the absence of an official ambassador to the Soviet Union. As a result of the Petrov Affair of 1954, diplomatic relations between Australia and the Soviet Union were severed and the Australian embassy was closed. Hill and his colleagues were ordered to leave the country within three days, and spent seven hours burning documents. However, their departure was delayed by the Soviet foreign ministry's refusal to grant them exit visas. Hill remained in Europe after his expulsion, as chargé d'affaires in Bonn, West Germany.

In 1961 Hill was appointed Ambassador to the Republic of Vietnam (South Vietnam), replacing Bill Forsyth. In 1964 he was appointed to succeed Robert Furlonger as Australia's consul-general in Geneva, Switzerland, and Permanent Representative of Australia to the United Nations Office in Geneva, with the rank of ambassador.

In 1974 Hill was appointed High Commissioner to New Zealand, replacing Annabelle Rankin. In 1976 he was announced as the new Ambassador to Ireland, following the recall of Vince Gair. In 1978 he succeeded Lance Barnard as resident Ambassador to Sweden, with accreditation also to Norway and Finland. He was also accredited as non-resident Ambassador to the Holy See in 1979. He retired from the Department of Foreign Affairs in 1980 with the rank of first assistant secretary.

Hill died on 7 May 1998, at the age of 78.

Diplomatic posts
Preceded by John McMillan as Chargé d'affaires	Head of Mission, Australian Embassy in Moscow; 1953–1954	Vacant Embassy closed
Preceded by Bill Forsyth	Australian Ambassador to the Republic of Vietnam; 1961–1964	Succeeded by Harold Anderson
Preceded by Robert Furlonger	Australian Permanent Representative to the UN Office in Geneva; 1964–1969	Succeeded by Harold Loveday
Preceded by L. J. Lawrey	Australian Ambassador to the United Arab Republic / Egypt; 1969–1972	Succeeded by Keith Scott
Preceded by Annabelle Rankin	Australian High Commissioner to New Zealand; 1974–1977	Succeeded by Colin Moodie
Preceded by Vince Gair	Australian Ambassador to Ireland; 1977–1978	Succeeded by Ruth Dobson
Preceded by Lance Barnard	Australian Ambassador to Sweden, Norway and Finland; 1978–1980	Succeeded by Kevin Flanagan
Preceded by John McMillan	Australian Ambassador to the Holy See; 1979–1980	Succeeded by Lloyd Thomson
