= List of ambassadors of Australia to the Holy See =

Ambassador of Australia to the Holy See

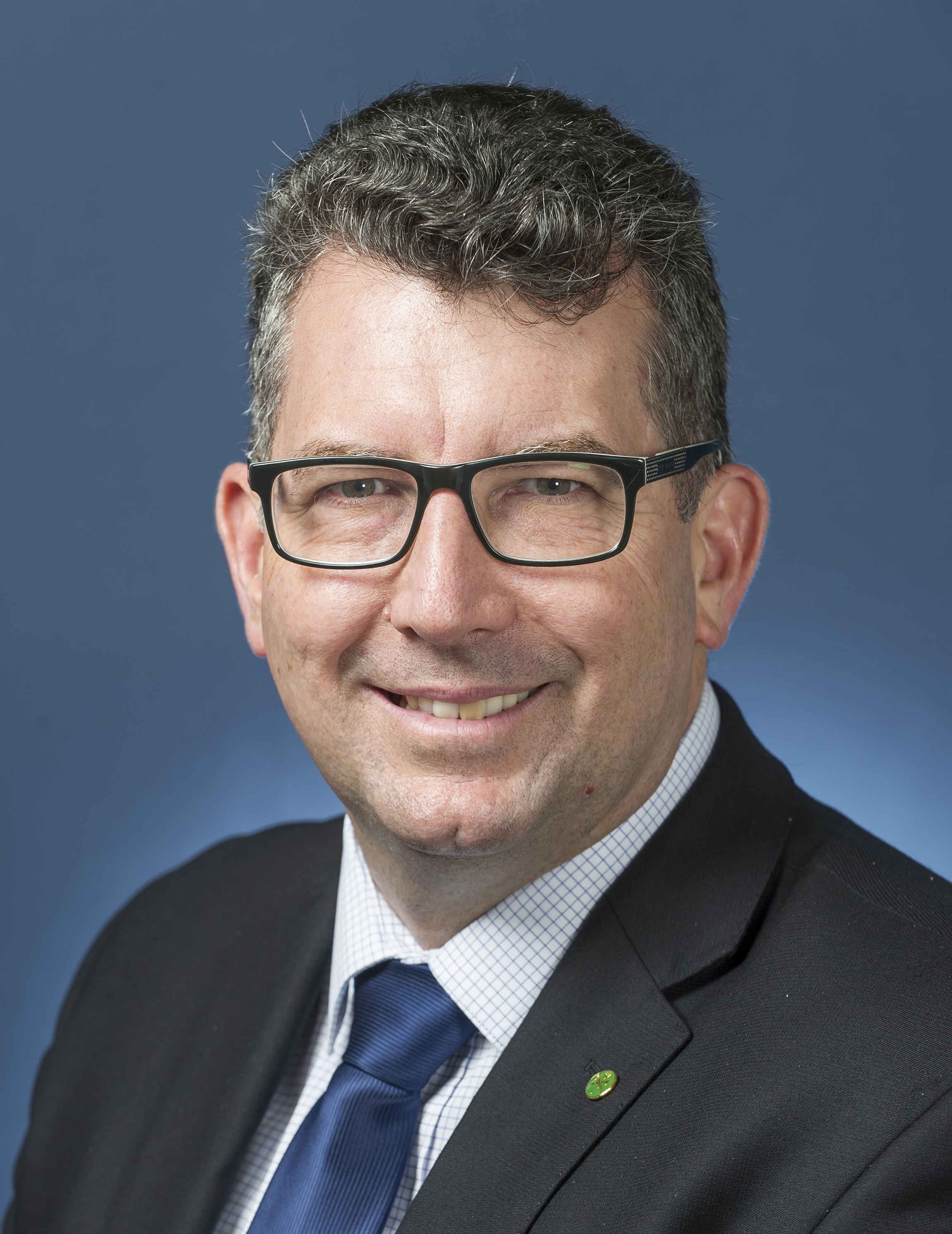
- Incumbent; Keith Pitt since 3 June 2025
- Department of Foreign Affairs and Trade
- Style: His Excellency
- Reports to: Minister for Foreign Affairs
- Residence: Vatican City
- Nominator: Prime Minister of Australia
- Appointer: Governor General of Australia
- Inaugural holder: Lloyd Thomson
- Formation: 1973

The Ambassador of Australia to the Holy See is an officer of the Australian Department of Foreign Affairs and Trade and the head of the Embassy of the Commonwealth of Australia to the Holy See. The first nominee for this position was Dudley McCarthy, appointed in 1973, who was also the ambassador to Spain, but the Vatican refused to accept the nomination on the grounds that McCarthy had been divorced. The appointment was subsequently attached to the office of the Ambassador to the Netherlands, Denmark, Turkey, Ireland, Malta, Sweden and Switzerland. In 2008 Tim Fischer was appointed as the first permanent resident ambassador to the Holy See. In 1986, Sir Peter Lawler had been appointed resident ambassador for four months prior to Pope John Paul II's visit to Australia. Keith Pitt is the current ambassador, having presented his credentials on 3 June 2025.

== List of heads of mission ==
| Ordinal | Officeholder | Title | Residency | Term start date | Term end date | Time in office | Notes |
|---|---|---|---|---|---|---|---|
| 1 | Lloyd Thomson LVO | Ambassador of Australia to the Holy See | The Hague, Netherlands | 1973 | 1974 | 0–1 years | |
| 2 | John McMillan | Ambassador of Australia to the Holy See | Turkey | 1974 | 1978 | 3–4 years | |
| (n/a) | John Mitchell Kirtley | Chargé d'affaires | | 1978 | 1979 | 0–1 years | |
| 3 | Brian Clarence Hill | Ambassador of Australia to the Holy See | Sweden | 1979 | 1980 | 0–1 years | |
| (1) | Lloyd Thomson | Ambassador of Australia to the Holy See | Dublin, Ireland (Note: Lawler was resident ambassador in the Vatican City for four months prior to Pope John Paul II's visit to Australia.) | 1980 | 1983 | 2–3 years | |
| 4 | Sir Peter Lawler OBE | Ambassador of Australia to the Holy See | Dublin, Ireland | 1983 | 1986 | 2–3 years | |
| (n/a) | Christopher Stephen Knott | Chargé d'affaires | | 1986 | 1987 | 0–1 years | |
| 5 | Frank Milne | Ambassador of Australia to the Holy See | | 1987 | 1988 | 0–1 years | |
| 6 | Brian Burke AO (Note: In April 1991, it was announced that Burke had resigned from his post with effect from July 1991 in order to face a royal commission and was eventually jailed. Burke was asked to hand back his appointment as an Officer of the Order of Australia.) | Ambassador of Australia to the Holy See | Dublin, Ireland | 5 June 1988 | 31 July 1991 | 3 years, 56 days | |
| 7 | Terence McCarthy | Ambassador of Australia to the Holy See | | 1991 | 1993 | 1–2 years | |
| 8 | Michael Tate | Ambassador of Australia to the Holy See | The Hague, Netherlands | 1993 | 1996 | 2–3 years | |
| 9 | Edward Stevens | Ambassador of Australia to the Holy See | Dublin, Ireland | 1996 | 1998 | 1–2 years | |
| 10 | Bob Halverson OBE | Ambassador of Australia to the Holy See | Dublin, Ireland | 1998 | 2003 | 4–5 years | |
| 11 | John Herron | Ambassador of Australia to the Holy See | Dublin, Ireland | 2003 | 2006 | 2–3 years | |
| 12 | Anne Plunkett | Ambassador of Australia to the Holy See | Dublin, Ireland | 2006 | 2008 | 1–2 years | |
| 13 | Tim Fischer AC | Ambassador of Australia to the Holy See | Vatican City | 2008 | 2012 | 3–4 years | |
| 14 | John McCarthy , QC | Ambassador of Australia to the Holy See | Vatican City | August 2012 | 29 January 2016 | 3 years, 5 months | |
| 15 | Melissa Hitchman | Ambassador of Australia to the Holy See | Vatican City | 2016 | 2020 | 3–4 years | |
| 16 | Chiara Porro | Ambassador of Australia to the Holy See | Vatican City | 27 August 2020 | 29 November 2024 | 4 years, 94 days | |
| (n/a) | Marcus Wu | Chargé d'affaires | Vatican City | 29 November 2024 | 3 June 2025 | 186 days | |
| 17 | Keith Pitt | Ambassador of Australia to the Holy See | Vatican City | 3 June 2025 | incumbent | 1 year, 166 days | |
