= List of ambassadors of Australia to Ukraine =

Ambassador of Australia to Ukraine
- Incumbent; Geoff Bowan since 7 April 2026
- Department of Foreign Affairs and Trade
- Style: His Excellency
- Reports to: Minister for Foreign Affairs
- Residence: Moscow (1992–2009); Vienna (2009–2013); Warsaw (2013–2014, 2023–2025); Kyiv (2014–2022, 2025–present); Lviv (2022)
- Seat: 13 Kostelna Street, Kyiv
- Nominator: Prime Minister of Australia
- Appointer: Governor General of Australia
- Inaugural holder: Cavan Hogue (resident in Moscow)
- Formation: 10 January 1992
- Website: Australian Embassy, Ukraine

The ambassador of Australia to Ukraine is an officer of the Australian Department of Foreign Affairs and Trade and the head of the Embassy of the Commonwealth of Australia to Ukraine. The position has the rank and status of an ambassador extraordinary and plenipotentiary and is currently held by Geoff Bowan since April 2026. The embassy is co-located with the Canadian Embassy in Kyiv, but was closed from February 2022 to January 2025 due to the 2022 Russian invasion of Ukraine, with Australian officials based during that time in eastern Poland and Romania. Since 2020, the ambassador also holds non-resident accreditation for Moldova.

== Posting history ==
Ukraine and Australia have enjoyed diplomatic relations since 1942 when Australia opened channels with the Soviet Union (which included the Ukrainian Soviet Socialist Republic), although independent relations did not occur until the collapse of the Soviet Union and the establishment of a fully independent Ukraine in late 1991. With the dissolution of the Soviet Union in late 1991, Australia acted to recognise the new states of the Commonwealth of Independent States on 26 December 1991. Non-resident accreditation to Ukraine, based with the Australian Embassy in Moscow, was later established from 10 January 1992, with the Australian Ambassador in Moscow, Cavan Hogue, presenting his credentials to the President of Ukraine, Leonid Kravchuk on 9 March 1992. Accreditation was transferred to the new interim embassy established in Kyiv in November 2014 following the 2014 pro-Russian unrest in Ukraine. From 5 November 1992 to the opening of a resident embassy in 2014, Australia maintained a Consulate in Kyiv headed by an Honorary Consul, Serhiy Mykolayovych Berezovenko, a prominent economist and businessman based in the city.

The first resident ambassador, Doug Trappett, who was previously Deputy Head of Mission in Rome, had been sent to Kyiv in December 2014 to deal with matters relating to the controversial downing of Malaysia Airlines Flight 17, which led to the deaths of 27 Australian citizens. Trappett presented his credentials on 14 January 2015.

Although initially considered an interim measure for 12 months, pending the resolution of the conflicts in the region, with the stalemating of various issues and the hardening of Ukrainian-Russian relations, the embassy's term of existence was extended in February 2016 to September 2016. In September 2016, the decision was taken by foreign minister Julie Bishop to extend the embassy's term for a further two years, noting that a continued resident diplomatic presence would allow Australia: "to work alongside their Ukrainian partners in close cooperation and further develop bilateral ties between the two countries."

On 13 February 2022, amid increasing tensions immediately prior to the Russian invasion of Ukraine, the Australian Embassy was relocated from the capital Kyiv to the western Ukrainian city of Lviv. However, on 22 February 2022, a day before the Russian invasion, Foreign Minister Marise Payne directed that all Australian officials were to leave the country and operate from eastern Poland and Romania.

On 9 December 2023, Paul Lehmann was announced as the new ambassador to Ukraine, replacing Bruce Edwards. Lehmann is also accredited to Moldova. He presented his credentials to the Ukrainian Minister of Foreign Affairs, Andrii Sybiha, on 22 April 2024. On 18 December, Penny Wong, the Australian Minister for Foreign Affairs, announced that Australia will reopen its embassy in Kyiv in January 2025, and the embassy reopened from 28 January 2025. On 8 February 2026, Foreign Minister Penny Wong announced that Geoff Bowan would be appointed as Ambassador to Ukraine and non-resident Ambassador to the Republic of Moldova.[16] On 7 April 2026, Geoff Bowan formally assumed his duties as Ambassador of Australia to Ukraine on 7 April 2026, when he presented his credentials to President Volodymyr Zelenskyy. [17]

#	Officeholder	Residency	Term start date	Term end date	Time in office	Notes
1	Cavan Hogue	Moscow, Russia	10 January 1992	November 1994	2 years, 9 months	
2	Geoffrey Bentley	Moscow, Russia	November 1994	November 1998	4 years	
3	Ruth Pearce	Moscow, Russia	18 November 1998	29 January 2002	3 years, 72 days	
4	Leslie Rowe	Moscow, Russia	18 December 2002	February 2005	2 years, 1 month	
5	Bob Tyson	Moscow, Russia	28 February 2005	June 2009	4 years, 3 months	
6	Margaret Twomey	Moscow, Russia	June 2008	2009	0 years	
7	Michael Potts	Vienna, Austria	2009	2013	3–4 years	
8	Jean Dunn	Warsaw, Poland	2013	2014	0–1 years	
9	Doug Trappett	Kyiv, Ukraine	12 December 2014	March 2016	1 year, 2 months	
–	Bruce Edwards (Chargé d'Affaires)	Kyiv, Ukraine	March 2016	30 May 2017	1 year, 2 months	
10	Melissa O'Rourke	Kyiv, Ukraine	30 May 2017	4 October 2020	3 years, 127 days	
11	Bruce Edwards	Kyiv, Ukraine	4 October 2020	13 February 2022	3 years, 65 days	
11	Bruce Edwards	Lviv, Ukraine	13 February 2022	22 February 2022	3 years, 65 days	
11	Bruce Edwards	Poland/Romania	22 February 2022	8 December 2023	3 years, 65 days	
12	Paul Lehmann	Warsaw, Poland	9 December 2023	28 January 2025	2 years, 114 days	
12	Paul Lehmann	Kyiv, Ukraine	28 January 2025	2 April 2026	2 years, 114 days	
13	Geoff Bowan	Kyiv, Ukraine	7 April 2026	incumbent		[16]

== See also ==
- Foreign relations of Ukraine
- Foreign relations of Australia
