= List of ambassadors of Australia to Russia =

Ambassador of Australia to the Russian Federation

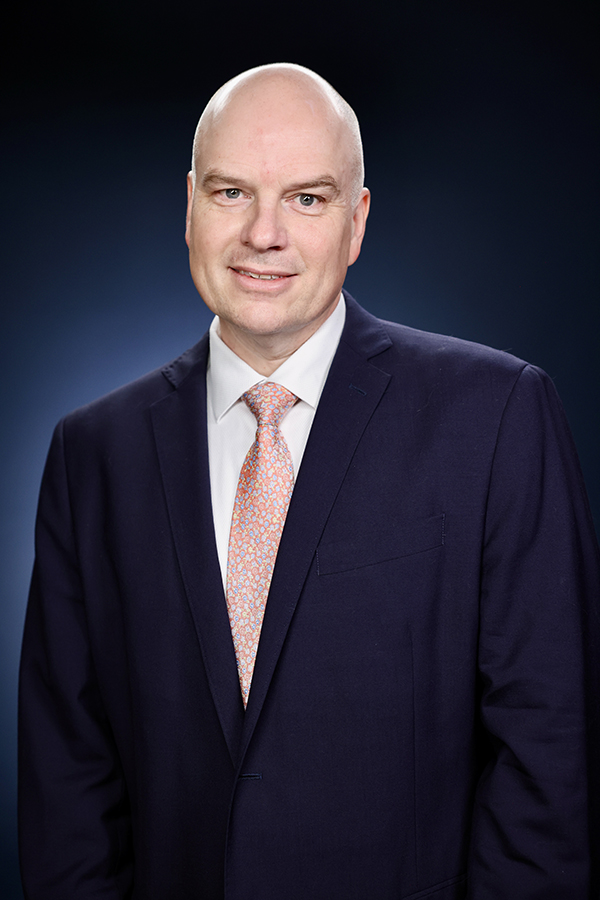
- Incumbent; John Geering since 14 November 2023
- Department of Foreign Affairs and Trade
- Style: His Excellency
- Reports to: Minister for Foreign Affairs
- Nominator: Prime Minister of Australia
- Appointer: Governor-General of Australia
- Inaugural holder: Bill Slater
- Formation: 2 January 1943
- Website: Australian Embassy, Russian Federation

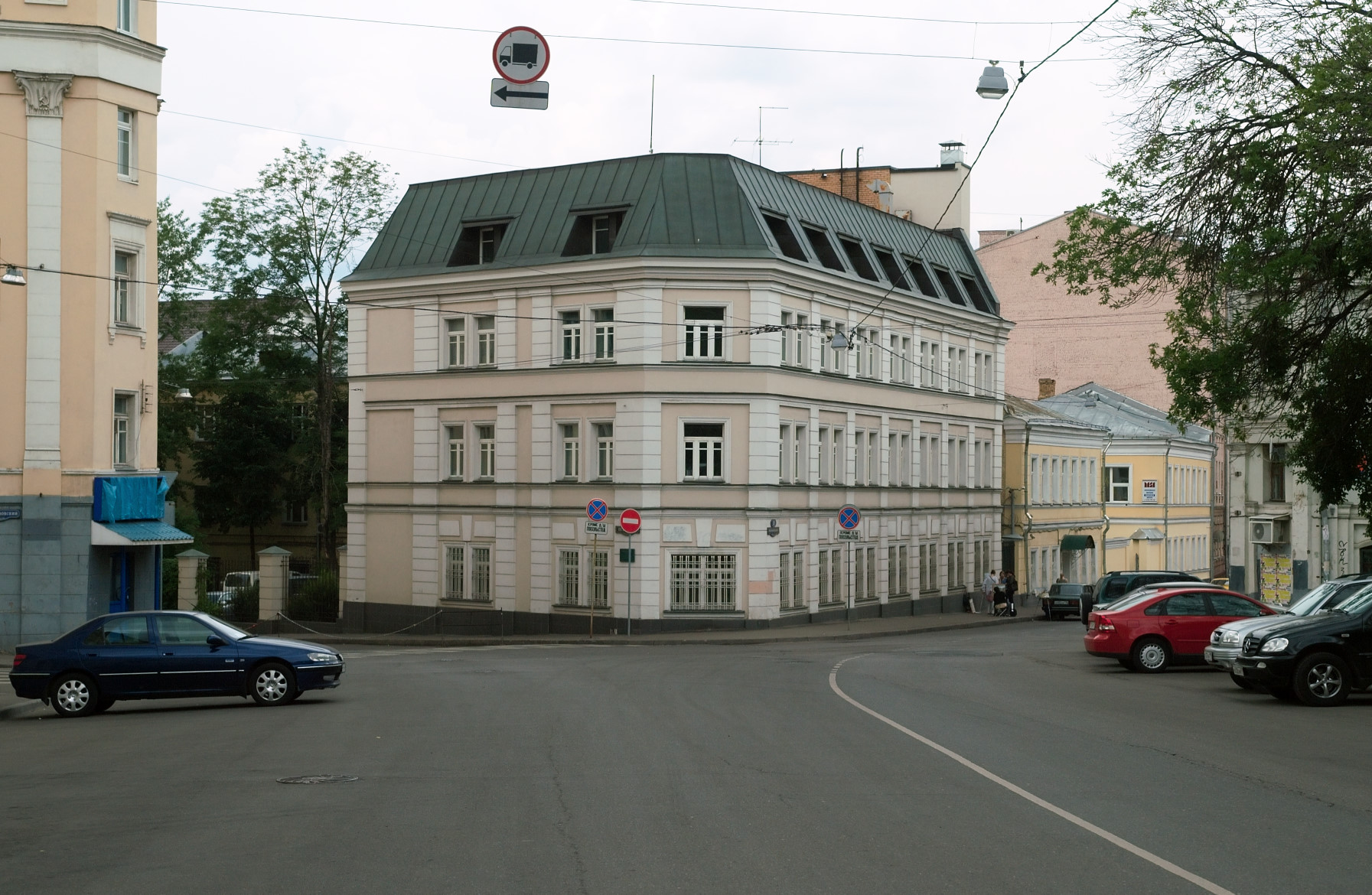
The Australian Embassy, Podkolokolny Pereulok 11, Moscow.

The ambassador of Australia to the Russian Federation is an officer of the Australian Department of Foreign Affairs and Trade and the head of the Embassy of the Commonwealth of Australia to the Russian Federation. The position has the rank and status of an ambassador extraordinary and plenipotentiary and holds non-resident accreditation for Kazakhstan, Uzbekistan, Kyrgyzstan, Turkmenistan, Tajikistan, Armenia and Belarus. The current ambassador since November 2023 is John Geering.

== Posting history ==
Australia's first diplomatic presence in Russia was established in 1942. This occurred on 13 October 1942 with the conclusion of negotiations between Foreign Ministers Herbert Evatt and Vyacheslav Molotov. The Australian legation opened in January 1943 (the first Minister, Bill Slater was appointed in October 1942) in the temporary Russian capital of Kuybyshev and the Soviet embassy in Canberra also opened in March 1943.

By the war's end the legation moved to Moscow and on 16 February 1948 was upgraded to an embassy. In February 1950 the ambassador Alan Watt was recalled by the Australian government and was not replaced. In April 1954 with the scandal of the Petrov Affair the embassy in Moscow was closed, but later reopened in 1959. Between 1964 and 1966, the ambassador in Moscow held accreditation as Ambassador to Sweden. Between June 1972 and September 1973, the ambassador in Moscow was accredited to Warsaw. With the dissolution of the Soviet Union in late 1991, Australia acted to recognise the new states of the Commonwealth of Independent States on 26 December 1991. As a result, the embassy's accreditation was transferred to the Russian Federation, while non-resident accreditation to many of the new former Soviet republics was acquired. Non-resident accreditation with Ukraine was consequently included from 10 January 1992, but was transferred to the new embassy established in Kyiv in February 2015 following the Euromaidan protests across Ukraine. From 12 June 1973 to 29 May 1991, accreditation to Mongolia was also held by the embassy in Moscow until it was transferred to the Embassy in Beijing. Accreditation for Azerbaijan (since 1991) and Georgia (since 1992) was transferred to the Embassy in Ankara, Turkey in 2011. Accreditation for Moldova was transferred to the embassy in Kyiv, Ukraine in 2019.

The Australian Government established an embassy in Almaty, Kazakhstan in 1995 and appointed its first resident ambassador, Douglas Townsend. The Australian Government announced plans to close its embassy in Kazakhstan in August 1999. According to the Department of Foreign Affairs and Trade, the closure was due to resource constraints.

== Officeholders ==
=== Heads of mission ===
Ordinal	Officeholder	Title	Other offices	Term start date	Term end date	Time in office	Notes
1	Bill Slater	Minister to the Soviet Union		12 October 1942	June 1943	7 months	
2	James Maloney	Minister to the Soviet Union		5 November 1943	12 August 1946	2 years, 280 days	
(n/a)	Noël Deschamps	Chargé d'affaires		12 August 1946	1947	0–1 years	
3	Alan Watt	Minister to the Soviet Union		June 1947	16 February 1948	2 years, 8 months	
3	Alan Watt	Ambassador to the Soviet Union		16 February 1948	10 February 1950	2 years, 8 months	
(n/a)	Frederick Blakeney	Chargé d'affaires		10 February 1950	September 1951	1 year, 6 months	
(n/a)	John McMillan	Chargé d'affaires		September 1951	14 October 1953	2 years, 1 month	
(n/a)	Brian Hill	Chargé d'affaires		14 October 1953	24 February 1954	133 days	
Embassy closed
(n/a)	Bill Cutts	Chargé d'affaires		22 July 1959	28 July 1960	1 year, 6 days	
4	Keith Waller	Ambassador to the Soviet Union		28 July 1960	1962	1–2 years	
5	Stewart Wolfe Jamieson	Ambassador to the Soviet Union	^{A}	1962	1965	2–3 years	
6	John Rowland	Ambassador to the Soviet Union	^{A}	February 1965	1968	2–3 years	
7	Frederick Blakeney	Ambassador to the Soviet Union		1968	June 1972	3–4 years	
8	Lawrence John Lawrey	Ambassador to the Soviet Union	^{B}^{D}	12 June 1972	April 1974	1 year, 9 months	
9	James Plimsoll	Ambassador to the Soviet Union	^{D}	23 April 1974	4 August 1977	3 years, 103 days	
10	Murray Bourchier	Ambassador to the Soviet Union	^{D}	4 August 1977	August 1980	2 years, 11 months	
11	David Wyke Evans	Ambassador to the Soviet Union	^{D}	1 March 1981	March 1984	3 years	
12	Ted Pocock	Ambassador to the Soviet Union	^{D}	21 March 1984	September 1987	3 years, 5 months	
13	Robin Ashwin	Ambassador to the Soviet Union	^{D}	28 September 1987	May 1991	3 years, 7 months	
14	Cavan Hogue	Ambassador to the Soviet Union		29 May 1991	26 December 1991	3 years, 5 months	
14	Cavan Hogue	Ambassador to the Russian Federation	^{C}^{E}^{F}^{G}^{H}^{I}^{J}^{K}^{L}^{M}	26 December 1991	November 1994	3 years, 5 months	
15	Geoffrey Bentley	Ambassador to the Russian Federation	^{C}^{E}^{F}^{G}^{I}^{J}^{K}^{L}^{M}	2 November 1994	19 December 1998	4 years, 47 days	
16	Ruth Pearce	Ambassador to the Russian Federation	^{C}^{E}^{F}^{G}^{H}^{I}^{J}^{K}^{L}^{M}	18 November 1998	29 January 2002	3 years, 72 days	
17	Leslie Rowe	Ambassador to the Russian Federation	^{C}^{E}^{F}^{G}^{H}^{I}^{J}^{K}^{L}^{M}	18 December 2002	February 2005	2 years, 1 month	
18	Bob Tyson	Ambassador to the Russian Federation	^{C}^{E}^{F}^{G}^{H}^{I}^{J}^{K}^{L}^{M}	28 February 2005	June 2008	3 years, 3 months	
19	Margaret Twomey	Ambassador to the Russian Federation	^{C}^{E}^{F}^{G}^{H}^{I}^{J}^{K}^{L}^{M}	June 2008	October 2013	5 years, 4 months	
20	Paul Myler	Ambassador to the Russian Federation	^{C}^{G}^{H}^{I}^{J}^{K}^{L}^{M}	24 October 2013	December 2015	2 years, 1 month	
21	Peter Tesch	Ambassador to the Russian Federation	^{G}^{H}^{I}^{J}^{K}^{L}^{M}	January 2016	April 2019	3 years, 3 months	
22	Graeme Meehan	Ambassador to the Russian Federation	^{G}^{H}^{I}^{J}^{K}^{L}^{M}	5 February 2020	14 November 2023	3 years, 282 days	
23	John Geering	Ambassador to the Russian Federation	^{G}^{H}^{I}^{J}^{K}^{L}^{M}	14 November 2023	incumbent	2 years, 297 days	

== Notes ==
^A: Also served as non-resident Ambassador of Australia to Sweden, between 1964 and 1966.
^B: Also served as non-resident Ambassador of Australia to Poland, between June 1972 and September 1973.
^C: Also served as non-resident Ambassador of Australia to Ukraine, between 10 January 1992 and February 2015.
^D: Also served as non-resident Ambassador of Australia to Mongolia, between 12 June 1973 to 29 May 1991.
^E: Also served as non-resident Ambassador of Australia to the Republic of Azerbaijan between 26 December 1991 and 2011.
^F: Also served as non-resident Ambassador of Australia to Georgia, between 1992 and 2011.
^G: Also served as non-resident Ambassador of Australia to the Republic of Uzbekistan, since 26 December 1991.
^H: Also served as non-resident Ambassador of Australia to the Republic of Kazakhstan, between 26 December 1991 and June 1995, and since 1999.
^I: Also served as non-resident Ambassador of Australia to the Kyrgyz Republic, since 26 December 1991.
^J: Also served as non-resident Ambassador of Australia to Turkmenistan, since 26 December 1991.
^K: Also served as non-resident Ambassador of Australia to the Republic of Tajikistan, since 26 December 1991.
^L: Also served as non-resident Ambassador of Australia to the Republic of Armenia, since 26 December 1991.
^M: Also served as non-resident Ambassador of Australia to the Republic of Belarus, since 26 December 1991.

=== Ambassadors to Kazakhstan ===
Ordinal	Officeholder	Term start date	Term end date	Time in office	Notes
1	Douglas Townsend	June 1995	November 1997	2 years, 5 months	
2	Peter Tesch	November 1997	1999	1–2 years	

== See also ==
- Russia-Australia relations
- Foreign relations of Australia
