= Frederick Blakeney =

Australian public servant and diplomat

Frederick Blakeney CBE
- Born: Frederick Joseph Blakeney; 2 July 1913; Chatswood, New South Wales
- Died: 19 June 1990 (aged 76); Darlinghurst, New South Wales
- Education: University of Sydney (BA (Hons))
- Occupations: Public servant, diplomat
- Spouse: Marjorie Grosmont Martin (m. 1943–1990)

Frederick Joseph Blakeney CBE (2 July 1913 – 16 June 1990) was an Australian public servant and diplomat.

Blakeney joined the Commonwealth Public Service in the Department of External Affairs in 1946. His first post as head of mission at an overseas posting was as Minister to Cambodia, Laos and Vietnam.

In March 1974, Blakeney was appointed Australian Ambassador to the Netherlands. In 1977 he completed his post in The Hague and was appointed the Australian Ambassador to the European Office of the United Nations in Geneva.

Blakeney retired from the public service in 1978.

Diplomatic posts
Preceded by Alan Watt as Ambassador	Australian Ambassador to the Soviet Union (Chargé d'Affaires); 1950–1951	Succeeded by John McMillan as Chargé d'Affaires
Preceded by David McNicol	Australian Minister to Cambodia; 1957	Succeeded by Francis Hamilton Stuart
Preceded by David McNicol	Australian Minister to Vietnam; Australian Minister to Laos; 1957–1959	Succeeded by Bill Forsyth
Preceded by Alan Watt	Australian Ambassador to the Federal Republic of Germany; 1962–1968	Succeeded by Edward Ronald Walker
Preceded by John Rowland	Australian Ambassador to the Soviet Union; 1968–1972	Succeeded by Lawrence John Lawrey
Preceded by Lloyd Thomson	Australian Ambassador to the Netherlands; 1974–1977	Succeeded by David Fairbairn
Preceded by Owen Davis	Permanent Representative of Australia to the United Nations Office in Geneva; 1977–1978	Succeeded by Lloyd Thomson
