= Bill Forsyth (diplomat) =

Australian public servant and diplomat

Bill Forsyth OBE
- Born: William Douglass Forsyth; 1909; Casterton, Victoria
- Died: 3 March 1993 (aged 84)
- Education: University of Melbourne (BA (Hons)
- Occupations: Public servant, diplomat

William Douglass Forsyth OBE (5 January1909 – 3 March 1993) was an Australian public servant and diplomat. Over the course of his tenure, he was noted for his work both within the United Nations, and in promoting Southern Pacific countries internationally. In 1959, Forsyth was appointed Australian Ambassador to Vietnam, a role which he served in until 1961. During his appointment, he was also appointed Minister to Laos.

Forsyth died on 3 March 1993, aged 84, in Canberra.

== Early life ==
Forsyth was born in Casterton, Victoria where he spent his childhood. He attended Ballarat High School in 1921 and graduated in 1924. He then became a student teacher and received a Melbourne Teachers' College studentship in 1927, which allows him to study and obtain his degree in political science and history at the University of Melbourne.

== Oral History ==
An oral history interviewed by Mel Pratt, can be found at the National Library of Australia.

Diplomatic posts
Preceded by Mick Shann as Acting Representative	Permanent Representative of Australia to the United Nations; 1951–1956	Succeeded by Edward Ronald Walker
Preceded by Frederick Blakeney as Australian Minister to Vietnam and Laos	Australian Ambassador to Vietnam; 1959–1961	Succeeded by Brian Hill
Preceded by Frederick Blakeney as Australian Minister to Vietnam and Laos	Australian Minister to Laos; 1959–1960	Succeeded by Arthur Morris
Preceded by D.J. Kingsmill as Chargé d'affaires	Australian Ambassador to Lebanon; 1967–1970	Succeeded by Neil Truscott
