= List of ambassadors of Australia to Vietnam =

Ambassador of Australia to Vietnam

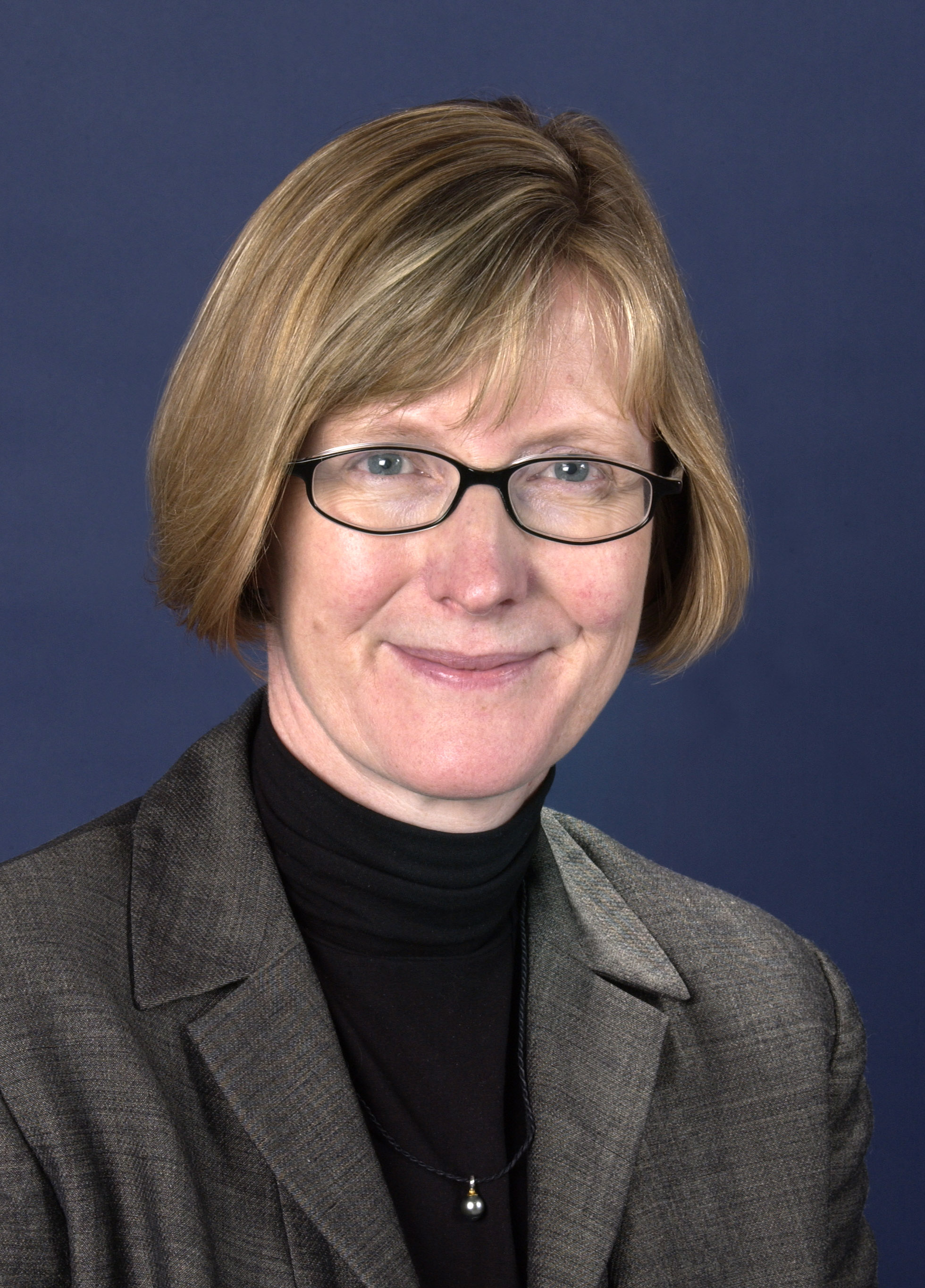
- Incumbent; Gillian Bird since 9 March 2025
- Department of Foreign Affairs and Trade
- Style: Her Excellency
- Reports to: Minister for Foreign Affairs
- Residence: Hanoi
- Nominator: Prime Minister of Australia
- Appointer: Governor General of Australia
- Inaugural holder: John Rowland
- Formation: 23 March 1952
- Website: Australian Embassy, Vietnam

The ambassador of Australia to Vietnam is an officer of the Australian Department of Foreign Affairs and Trade and the head of the Embassy of the Commonwealth of Australia to the Socialist Republic of Vietnam. The position has the rank and status of an ambassador extraordinary and plenipotentiary and has resided exclusively in Hanoi since 1975. The current ambassador, since March 2025, is Gillian Bird.

The ambassador's work has been assisted since 1994 by a Consulate-General in Ho Chi Minh City.

== Posting history ==
In 1949, the three constituent states of French Indochina, the State of Vietnam and the protectorates of Cambodia and Laos were granted the status of an associated state within the French Union, with gradual limited independence from 1950 including in foreign affairs. On 12 January 1952, the Australian Minister for External Affairs, Richard Casey, announced the establishment of diplomatic relations between Australia and the Associated States of Vietnam, Laos, and Cambodia, and that a legation would be established in Saigon. The legation opened on 23 March 1952, with John Rowland as charge d'affaires, and the first minister, John Quinn, took office from November 1952. Quin presented his credentials to the Chief of State of Vietnam, Bảo Đại, on 29 December 1952, to the King of Cambodia, Norodom Sihanouk, on 7 February 1953, and to the King of Laos, Sisavang Vong, on 2 April 1953.

On 20 January 1955, External Affairs Minister Casey announced that a separate Australian Legation to Cambodia would shortly be established in Phnom Penh, with the minister resident in Saigon continuing to be accredited to Cambodia. The Cambodia office opened on 29 October 1955 with Harold David Anderson as charge d'affaires, and the Saigon-resident ministers would continue to represent Cambodia until 1957, when a separate minister was appointed. A separate legation office for Laos was established in Vientiane on 12 October 1959, and on 30 December 1960 Arthur Morris was appointed as the first separate minister to Laos. On 21 August 1959, with the appointment of the first ambassador to Vietnam, Bill Forsyth, the Saigon legation was raised to the status of embassy. The Australian Embassy to the Republic of Vietnam, based from 1962 to 1975 in the Caravelle Hotel, was evacuated in the days before the Fall of Saigon.

On 26 February 1973, Australia established diplomatic relations with the Democratic Republic of Vietnam (North Vietnam) and opened its embassy in Hanoi on 28 July 1973. David Wilson was appointed the first ambassador on 7 November 1973. On 22 August 1975, with the collapse of the government of the Republic of Vietnam on 30 April 1975, Australia established diplomatic relations with the Provisional Revolutionary Government of the Republic of South Vietnam, with ambassador Wilson in Hanoi holding non-resident accreditation to the provisional government from 8 August 1975. On 22 January 1976 Wilson presented his credentials in Saigon. On 2 July 1976, it was announced that North and South Vietnam had merged to form the Socialist Republic of Vietnam, with Hanoi as the capital, and the Australian Embassy continued its representation there. A Consulate-General opened in Ho Chi Minh City in November 1994 as part of an Australian Government expansion of trade-focused diplomatic posts.

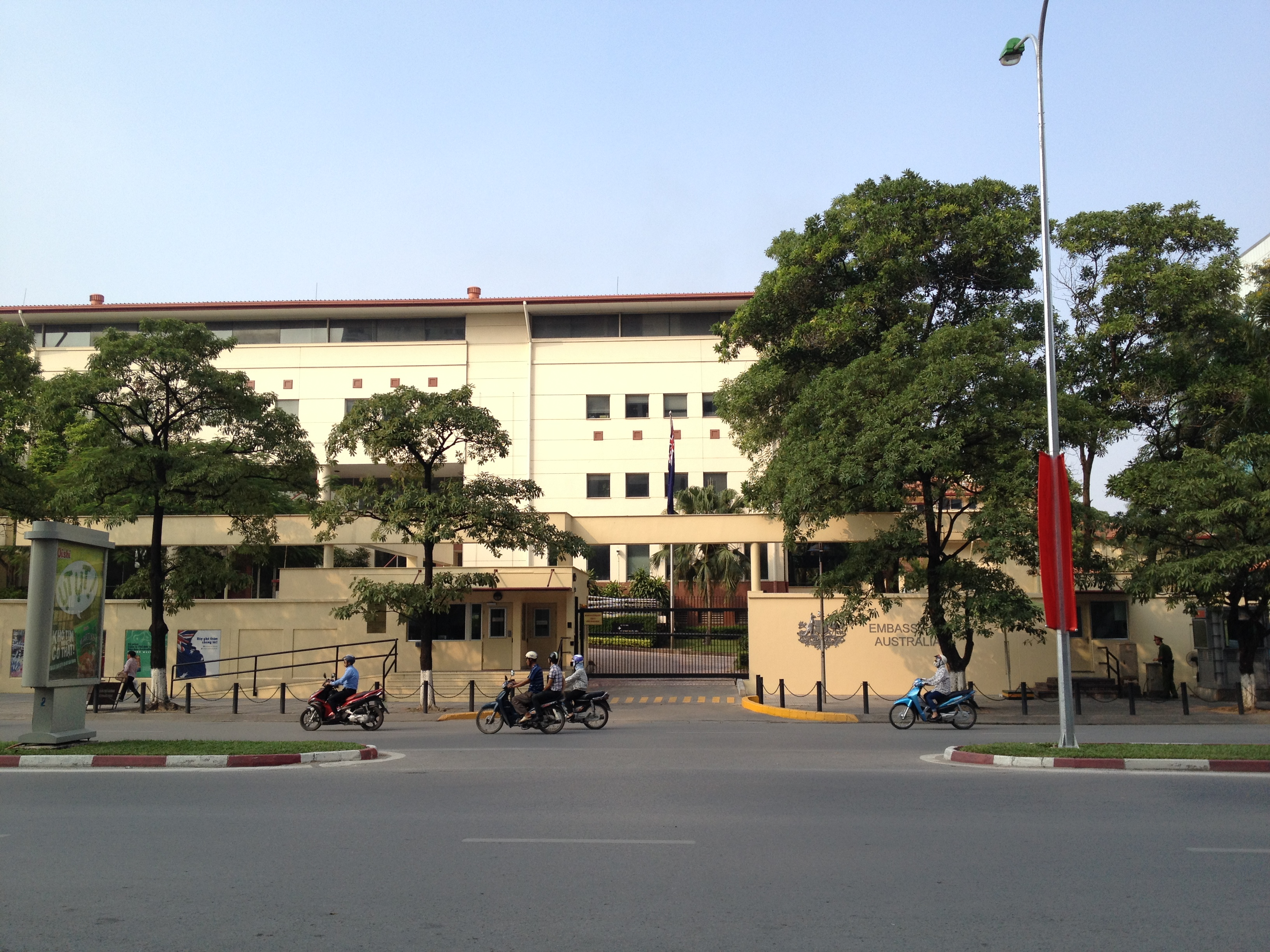
The Embassy of Australia, located on 8 Dao Tan Street, Ba Đình district, Hanoi, since 1995.

== Heads of mission ==
=== Ministers to Vietnam ===
Name	Start of term	End of term	References
John Rowland (Charge d'Affaires)	23 March 1952	12 November 1952	
John Quinn	12 November 1952	1955	
David McNicol	1955	1956	
Frederick Blakeney	1957	21 August 1959	

=== Ambassadors to the Republic of Vietnam (South Vietnam) ===
Name	Start of term	End of term	References
Bill Forsyth	21 August 1959	15 December 1961	
Brian Clarence Hill	15 December 1961	1 March 1964	
Harold David Anderson	1 March 1964	7 July 1966	
Lew Border	7 July 1966	9 August 1968	
Ralph Harry	9 August 1968	29 December 1970	
Arthur Morris	29 December 1970	26 July 1973	
Michael Cook	26 July 1973	22 March 1974	
Geoffrey John Price	22 March 1974	25 April 1975	
Republic replaced by Provisional Revolutionary Government
David Wilson (resident in Hanoi)	8 August 1975	2 July 1976	

=== Ambassador to the Democratic Republic of Vietnam (North Vietnam) ===
Name	Start of term	End of term	References
Bruce Woodberry (Charge d'affaires)	28 July 1973	2 October 1974	
Graeme Lewis (Charge d'affaires)	2 October 1974	12 March 1975	
David Wilson	12 March 1975	2 July 1976	

=== Ambassadors to the Socialist Republic of Vietnam ===
Name	Start of term	End of term	References
David Wilson	2 July 1976	September 1976	
John Brook	September 1976	January 1979	
Philip Knight	January 1979	April 1981	
John McCarthy	April 1981	September 1983	
Richard Broinowski	September 1983	January 1986	
Ian Lincoln	January 1986	September 1988	
Graham Alliband	September 1988	August 1991	
Michael Potts	August 1991	October 1994	
Susan Boyd	October 1994	June 1998	
Michael Mann	June 1998	August 2002	
Joe Thwaites	August 2002	22 April 2005	
Bill Tweddell	22 April 2005	30 July 2008	
Allaster Cox	30 July 2008	5 May 2012	
Hugh Borrowman	5 May 2012	4 May 2016	
Craig Chittick	4 May 2016	22 March 2019	
Robyn Mudie	22 March 2019	30 September 2022	
Andrew Goledzinowski	30 September 2022	December 2024	
Gillian Bird	24 April 2025	Incumbent	

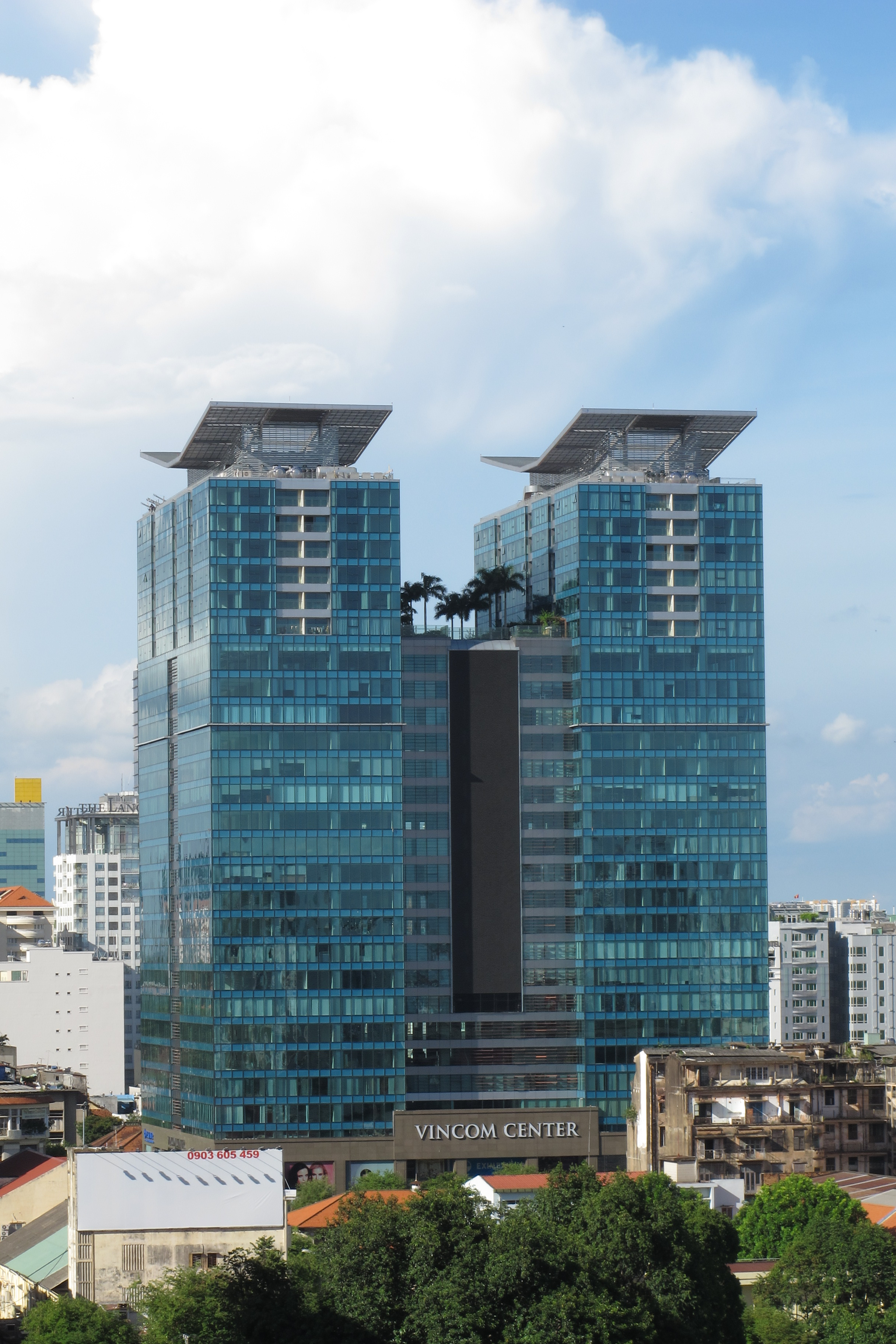
The Vincom Centre in central Ho Chi Minh City, home to the consulate-general since 2011.

== Consuls-General in Ho Chi Minh City ==
Name	Start of term	End of term	References
Peter Baxter	November 1994	June 1997	
Lisa Filipetto	June 1997	August 2001	
Dr Stephen Henningham	August 2001	August 2005	
Malcolm Skelly	August 2005	September 2008	
Graeme Swift	September 2008	11 December 2011	
John James McAnulty	11 December 2011	15 December 2015	
Karen Lanyon	15 December 2015	30 October 2018	
Julianne Cowley	30 October 2018	20 December 2021	
Sarah Hooper	20 December 2021	06 May 2026	
Kate Wallace	07 May 2026	present	

== See also ==
- Australia–Vietnam relations
