= Gary Gray (politician) =

Australian former politician (born 1958)

The Honourable Gary Gray AO
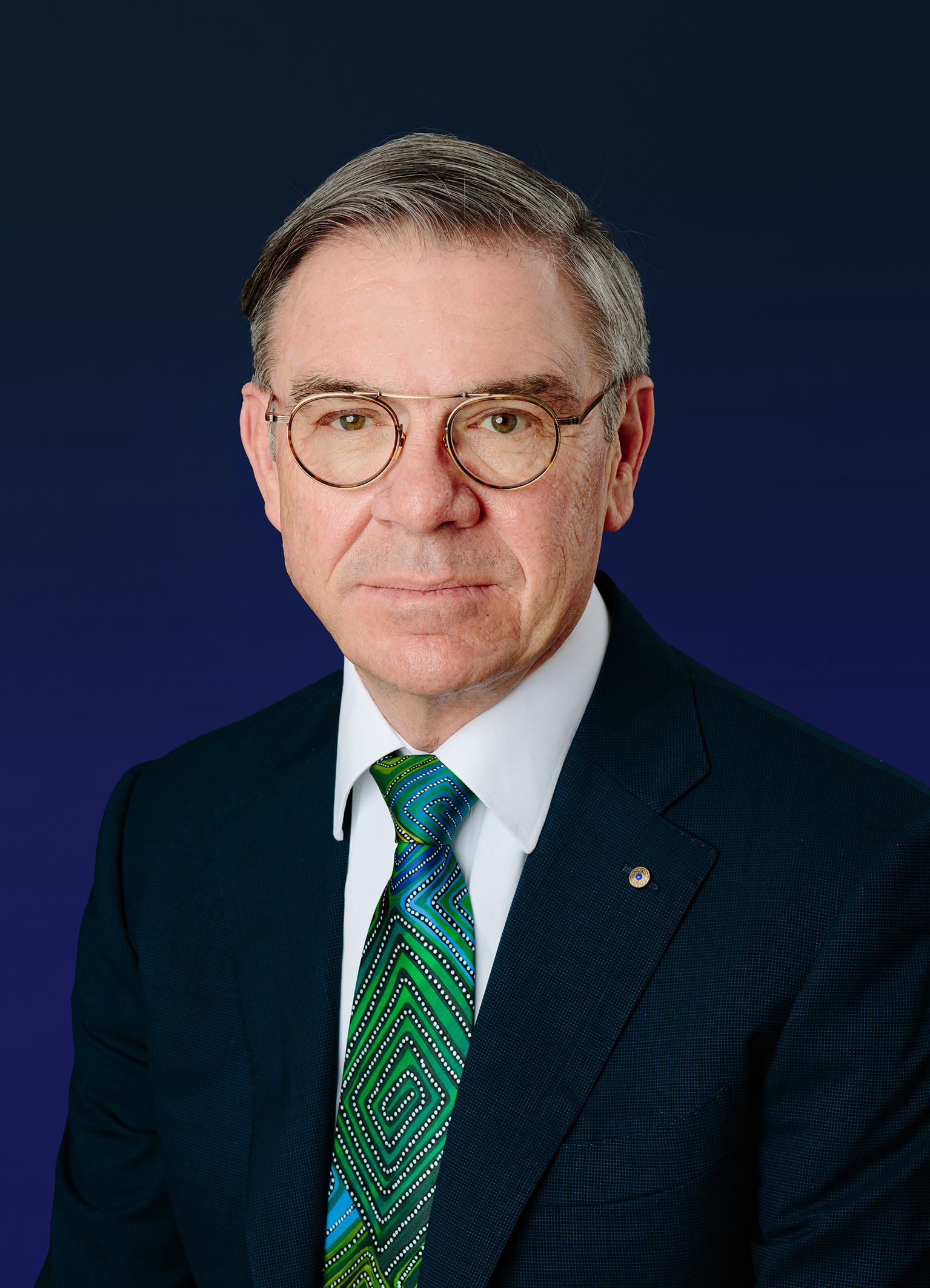

Australian Ambassador to Ireland
- In office 1 August 2020 – September 2024
- Preceded by: Robert Owen-Jones (Chargé d'affaires)
- Succeeded by: Lachlan Crews (Chargé d'affaires)

Minister for Resources and Energy
- In office 25 March 2013 – 18 September 2013
- Prime Minister: Julia Gillard; Kevin Rudd
- Preceded by: Martin Ferguson
- Succeeded by: Josh Frydenberg (2015)

Minister for Tourism
- In office 25 March 2013 – 18 September 2013
- Prime Minister: Julia Gillard; Kevin Rudd
- Preceded by: Martin Ferguson
- Succeeded by: Richard Colbeck (2015)

Minister for Small Business
- In office 25 March 2013 – 18 September 2013
- Prime Minister: Julia Gillard; Kevin Rudd
- Preceded by: Chris Bowen
- Succeeded by: Bruce Billson

Special Minister of State
- In office 14 September 2010 – 25 March 2013
- Prime Minister: Julia Gillard
- Preceded by: Joe Ludwig
- Succeeded by: Mark Dreyfus

Member of the Australian Parliament for Brand
- In office 24 November 2007 – 9 May 2016
- Preceded by: Kim Beazley
- Succeeded by: Madeleine King

National Secretary of the Labor Party
- In office 1993–2000
- Leader: Paul Keating; Kim Beazley
- Preceded by: Bob Hogg
- Succeeded by: Geoff Walsh

Personal details
- Born: 30 April 1958 (age 68) Rotherham, Yorkshire, UK
- Party: Australian Labor Party
- Spouse: Deborah Walsh (died 2017)
- Relations: Peter Walsh (father-in-law)
- Children: 3
- Education: Australian National University

Gary Gray AO (born 30 April 1958) is an Australian former politician who was the Australian Labor Party (ALP) representative for the Division of Brand in Western Australia in the House of Representatives from 2007 to 2016. On 25 March 2013, Gray was appointed to the Australian Cabinet as the Minister for Resources and Energy, the Minister for Tourism and the Minister for Small Business. From 2010 until 2013, Gray served as the Special Minister of State for the Public Service and Integrity.

Before entering Parliament in 2007 Gray spent 16 years as an official of the Australian Labor Party, rising to national secretary (1993–2000). He also held senior executive positions, before entering Parliament and again following his retirement from politics in 2016, at some of Australia's largest resources companies. In 1981, Gray graduated with a degree in economics from Australian National University in Canberra. He was awarded the Centenary Medal in 2001 and made an Officer of the Order of Australia in 2003.

From 2020 to 2024, Gray was Australia's Ambassador to Ireland.

== Early life and career ==
=== Early life ===
Gray was born in Rotherham, Yorkshire, England, and emigrated to Australia with his family in 1966, settling in state housing in Whyalla, South Australia. "In June 1966, Mum and Dad packed our bags and a trunk and, along with my brother, David, and sister, Carol, we sailed from Southampton, England, on the ship Fairsea. I was eight years old. Our destination was Adelaide. We were a family of £10 Poms," Gray would later recall, in a nod to a period of significant post-war European migration to Australia.

He attended Whyalla High School, where he was the dux of his graduating year in 1976. After finishing high school he worked at the local BHP steelworks in Whyalla, where his father Gordon had also worked, and then at the Savings Bank of South Australia. He joined the Labor Party in 1974, graduated from the Australian National University with a degree in economics in 1981 and moved to Darwin in 1982.

=== Early political career ===
From then until May 1985, Gray was the assistant to Northern Territory opposition leader Bob Collins. On a private visit to the UK in 1985, he worked for the British Labour Party for a year and inspecting the campaign organisation of other social democratic parties in France, Austria and Sweden. He became one of three national organisers for the ALP in March 1986, in which capacity he worked on the every state and federal ALP campaign between 1986 and 1993. As assistant national secretary during the successful 1987 and 1990 re-election campaigns by the Federal Labor government led by Prime Minister Bob Hawke, he initiated the party's marginal ("swing") seats campaign, pioneering the targeting of direct mail to voters in key seats. He was also responsible for fundraising, helping rectify a long-standing imbalance which had seen corporate funding disproportionately directed to the conservative parties. During this time he met and married his wife Deborah, the daughter of former Labor finance minister Peter Walsh.

On 30 April 1993, just after Paul Keating won the 1993 election, Gray became National Secretary of the ALP and served as campaign director for the 1996 and 1998 election campaigns. He was one of the few National Secretaries never to have served as a state party secretary, and his ascendancy represented a high-water mark for the influence of the national office in the party's political management.

In 1994 Gray led the initiative to create a web presence for the ALP, the first time a political party in Australia had taken its presence online. It matched the then-Labor government's policy on the internet as a tool for communication. Labor's use of the internet during the 1996 federal election was highlighted in a parliamentary research paper by Paula Williams alongside her assessment of the internet's use in the 1996 US presidential and 1997 United Kingdom elections.

One of Gray's early achievements was to establish the organisational capacity within the ALP to allow it to formally support the democracy movement in South Africa. This aligned the ALP's international activities with the policy position of the Hawke and Keating governments, led by Foreign Minister Gareth Evans. It also created a practical process for implementing the ALP's enduring position to oppose apartheid. The ALP's history of opposition to apartheid and cooperation with the African National Congress are documented in Peter Limb's book A Shared History: The ALP, the ANC and the Australian Anti-Apartheid.

On 10 November 1999 Gray announced his intention to resign as National Secretary. He left the post in April 2000, having served seven years in the role. At the time Gray was the youngest and longest-serving National Secretary in ALP history. Following his departure, Gray and his young family moved to Perth, Western Australia.

Keating, in 2007, blamed Gray for the loss of the 1996 and 1998 elections, a view that was not shared by the leadership of the ALP at the time.

One of the enduring political campaign strategies driven by Gray was the introduction of sausage sizzles at pre-election events. One such "free family sausage sizzle", often also referred to as Democracy Sausage, was arranged for an Australia Day event at Whiteman Park in Perth's north a week before the 1989 state election. The event was attended by Western Australia Labor Premier Peter Dowding and Prime Minister Bob Hawke and deemed a success by Labor. However, it attracted the ire of the WA Liberal Party, which complained to police that Labor may have breached the Electoral Act. Dowding denied the Act had been breached and was later vindicated by the Electoral Commission, which found that the "dissemination of sausages" was not a bribe under the Act.

In 2001, Gray was awarded the Commonwealth Government's Centenary Medal for "services to the political life of Australia as National Secretary of the Australian Labor Party". He was appointed an Officer of the Order of Australia in the Australia Day honours of 2003 for "service to the Australian Labor Party and to politics through the introduction of modern campaign techniques, fundraising protocols for all political parties, affirmative action guidelines, and by strengthening the party's organisational and financial structure." Gray's work on affirmative action guidelines is credited with the significant increase in female representation in all subsequent Labor State and Federal parliaments.

=== Corporate career ===
In April 2000, he quit working for the party hierarchy entirely and took up a role with Wesfarmers as the executive director of the Western Australian Institute of Medical Research, now known as the Harry Perkins Institute of Medical Research. Within a year, he was engaged by Woodside Petroleum as an adviser on the Perth oil and gas company's ultimately successful bid to repel a hostile takeover by the Shell Oil Company. Gray was then asked to join Woodside, becoming the Director of Corporate Affairs on the company's executive board. During his time at Woodside, Gray represented the company before governments on four continents in the roles of negotiator, advocate and leader. He is one of a number of federal parliamentarians who are subject to allegations of conflict of interest over their service to Woodside, including participation in the Australia–East Timor spying scandal of 2004.

== Federal parliamentary career ==
Gray left Woodside to contest pre-selection for the seat of Brand in Western Australia, to replace the retiring MP Kim Beazley, ahead of the 2007 federal election. Gray renounced his British citizenship at that time. The Brand electorate covers the City of Kwinana and the City of Rockingham, the southern areas of the Perth metropolitan area. Gray won the seat on a 0.97-point swing and was appointed Parliamentary Secretary for Regional Development and Northern Australia and later Parliamentary Secretary for Western and Northern Australia in the First Rudd Ministry.

During the 2010 leadership change in the Labor Party, Gray declared his support for Julia Gillard and has maintained support for Gillard since. At the 2010 federal election, he was re-elected as the Member for Brand and in the ensuing reshuffle appointed Special Minister of State (located in the Department of Finance and Deregulation) and Special Minister of State for the Public Service and Integrity in the Second Gillard Ministry. His latter role was restyled as Minister for the Public Service and Integrity following the December 2011 reshuffle with no apparent change in responsibility. In a reconfiguration of the Ministry in March 2013, Gray was elevated to the Cabinet and promoted as the Minister for Resources and Energy, the Minister for Tourism and the Minister for Small Business.

Gray's appointment as Minister for Resources and Energy was welcomed by the mining sector and business ("Miners welcome Gary Gray into resources job" Australian Financial Review 25 March 2013). The Australian Mines and Metals Association's Chief Executive Steve Knott issued a statement welcoming the appointment, saying Gray was "highly regarded" by the resources sector.

Following the 2013 election that delivered defeat for the Rudd government and the election of Tony Abbott as Prime Minister, Gray remained on the Opposition front bench under the leadership of Bill Shorten as Shadow Minister for Northern Australia, Shadow Minister for Resources and Shadow Special Minister of State.

In 2014, Japanese Prime Minister Shinzo Abe, addressing the Federal Parliament in Canberra for the first time, highlighted Gray's role in driving an exchange program with representatives of the National Diet, Japan's bicameral legislature, as a key plank of deepening ties between the two countries.

=== Foreign worker EMAs ===
As a parliamentary secretary in the Rudd government, Gray was asked to chair the National Resources Sector Employment Taskforce comprising employment and training agencies, unions and employers to examine ways of dealing with the expected shortage of workers on major resource projects. In July 2010, the taskforce put recommendations to the Federal Government, including a proposed enterprise migration agreement (EMA). After consideration by the Government, the Minister for Immigration and Citizenship, Chris Bowen, and the Minister for Resources and Energy, Martin Ferguson, announced on 25 May 2012 that the first EMA would be for the proposed $US10 billion Roy Hill world-scale iron ore mine, being developed in Western Australia's Pilbara region by businesswoman Gina Rinehart and her partners Marubeni Corporation, POSCO and China Steel Corporation. The announcement said more than 8000 workers would be required for the construction phase and to meet labour demand, the Government would allow up to 1715 skilled workers or 457 visas for overseas workers for the three-year construction phase. Roy Hill's construction coincided with an acute skills shortage in Western Australia's North West, driven by the concurrent investment of more than $100 billion in resources projects including Chevron's Gorgon and Wheatstone LNG plants, Woodside Petroleum's Pluto LNG project and Fortescue Metals Group's Solomon iron ore hub.

The day after the Government's EMA announcement, Australian Workers Union secretary Paul Howes, who was a member of the original taskforce, declared it "sheer lunacy" and an "ideal Christmas present" for Gina Rinehart. Later, five West Australian unions launched an advertising campaign against Gray in his electorate of Brand, linking his support of the EMA policy and the 26% youth unemployment rate in the electorate areas of Kwinana and Rockingham. The advertisements called for a protest outside Gray's electorate office on Saturday, 16 June 2012. Unionists also attacked Gray personally and Prime Minister Gillard issued a statement of her support for Gray, published in The Australian on 2 June, in which she described him as a "valuable member of the Government" who was a "dedicated, hard-working and effective minister". Ms Gillard also told Parliament "the Roy Hill agreement will go ahead (because) it supports Australian jobs and I support Australian jobs". Later, the WA unions cancelled their planned "community protest". Despite the PM's support, Opposition Leader Tony Abbott claimed "we have a prime minister who is not prepared to defend one of her most capable ministers" and went on to criticise the involvement of the unions in the Labor Party, referring to them as "the faceless men".

The Roy Hill consortium secured $US7.2 billion in debt finance to construct the 55Mtpa mine, 344 km rail and port operation. Roy Hill heralded the size of the debt financing as the "largest ever ... for the development of a land-based mining project worldwide". Up to 6000 workers were employed during the construction phase. First iron ore was shipped from Port Hedland in December 2015. The mine is one of the world's largest single sources of iron ore and has created permanent employment for about 2000 workers in the Pilbara and in Perth.

== Career after parliament ==
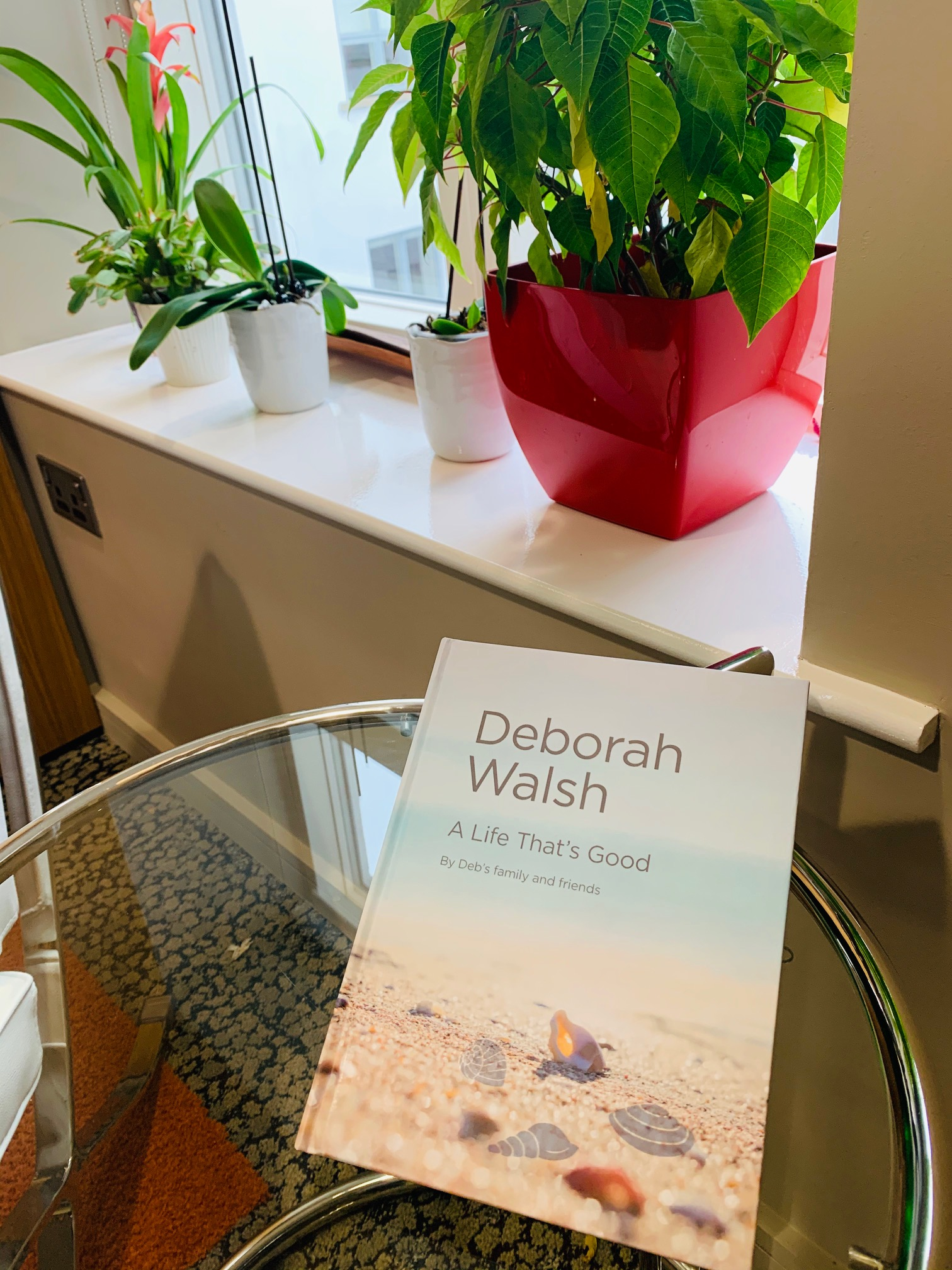
Deborah Walsh - A life That's Good by Deb's family and friends

In February 2016, Gray announced that he would not be contesting the upcoming election on 2 July, citing a need for Labor to enable the next generation to step up. He cited his late father-in-law Peter Walsh, a former finance minister in the Hawke government, who died in 2015. "Pete had a big career in Federal politics but he retired by the time he was 58", Gray told ABC radio. He was succeeded by Madeleine King.

Soon after the 2016 election Gray, who had maintained strong connections in Western Australia with both sides of politics and was well regarded for his pragmatic approach to working with the resources sector, returned to the corporate fold as general manager of external affairs for Mineral Resources.

In addition to his full-time role with Mineral Resources, Gray has served on the board of the Federal Government's navy shipbuilder ASC Shipbuilding, formerly the Australian Submarine Corporation, as a non-executive director since 2017 and is one of 13 trustees of the Channel 7 Telethon Trust, which is chaired by Richard Goyder.

Gray, who has had a lifelong passion for astronomy, is on the board of the Perth Observatory, Western Australia's oldest observatory, which is located 35 km east of Perth in Bickley. He also co-edited the book Not Just for Life: Gough Whitlam, a salute and tribute to former Prime Minister Gough Whitlam launched in 2016 to commemorate what would have been his 100th birthday.

Gray was married to Walsh's daughter Deborah, with whom he had three sons, Riley Walsh Gray, Darcy Walsh Gray and Toby Walsh Gray. Deborah died on 20 October 2017 following an 18-month battle with metastatic breast cancer.^{[32]} Gray asked those attending the funeral not to bring flowers but instead donate to the Peter MacCallum Cancer Centre in Melbourne, where his wife was taking part in its BROCADE research program to better understand how and why some breast cancers become resistant to therapies.

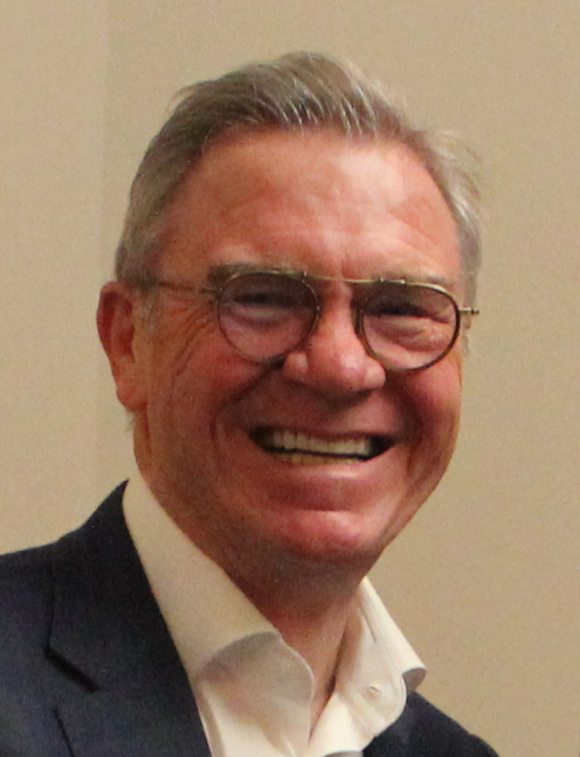
Gray in 2024

In June 2020, Gray self-published a book about Deborah. The book is entitled Deborah Walsh A life that’s Good. Its purpose was to tell her story through her family, friends and her food. Only 130 high quality copies were printed and were gifts to close family and friends. The Book was provided to the Parliamentary of Western Australia, the library of the Federal Parliament in Canberra and is in the Battye Library in Perth. Upon Gray's meeting with President of Ireland, Michael D Higgins, in September 2020, Gray gifted a copy for the Presidential library in Ireland.

=== Ambassador to Ireland ===
On 26 June 2020, the Commonwealth Government of Australia announced the appointment of Gray as Australia's next ambassador to Ireland. Gray succeeded Richard Andrews, who left Ireland in 2020 having held the Dublin-based role since late 2016. Gray's ambassadorship triggered his resignation at Mineral Resources Limited and the boards of ASC Shipbuilding, Channel 7 Telethon Trust and the Perth Observatory. Gary took up his new role in Dublin in August 2020 and presented his credentials to President Michael D. Higgins in September 2020. Gray was Ambassador from August 2020 to September 2024.

In 2021, Gray ensured that the Embassy in Dublin became the first Australian embassy in the world to permanently fly the Australian Aboriginal flag alongside the Australian flag.

== See also ==
- Second Gillard Ministry

Party political offices
Preceded by Bob Hogg	National Secretary of the Australian Labor Party; 1993–1999	Succeeded by Geoff Walsh
Parliament of Australia
Preceded by Kim Beazley	Member for Brand; 2007–2016	Succeeded by Madeleine King
Political offices
Preceded by Joe Ludwig	Special Minister of State; 2010–2013	Succeeded by Mark Dreyfus
Preceded by Martin Ferguson	Minister for Resources and Energy; 2013	Vacant Title next held by Josh Frydenberg
Preceded by Martin Ferguson	Minister for Tourism; 2013	Vacant Title next held by Richard Colbeck
Preceded by Martin Ferguson	Minister for Small Business; 2013	Succeeded by Bruce Billson
Diplomatic posts
Preceded by Robert Owen-Jones as Chargé d'affaires	Australian Ambassador to Ireland; 2020–2024	Succeeded by Lachlan Crews as Chargé d'affaires
