= Embassy of Australia, Dublin =

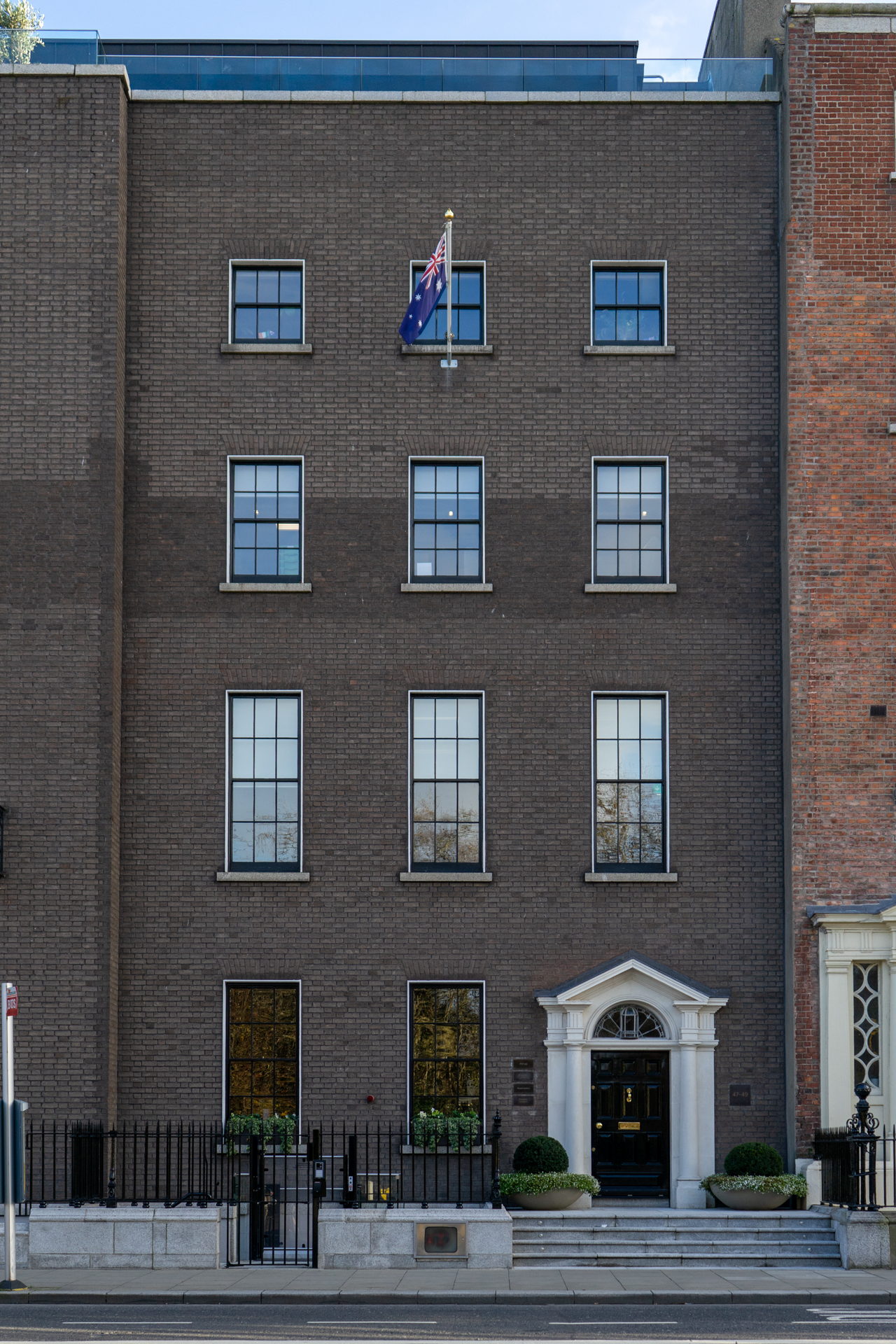
- The building containing the Australian Embassy.
- Location: (Republic of Ireland) St. Stephen's Green, Dublin
- Address: 3rd Floor, 47/49 St Stephen's Green, Dublin 2
- Coordinates: 53.337667°N 6.255781°W
- Ambassador: Gary Gray
- Website: Australian Embassy, Ireland

The Embassy of Australia in Ireland is the diplomatic mission of the Commonwealth of Australia in Ireland. The embassy is located in the capital city of Ireland, Dublin.

On 26 June 2020, the Australian Government announced the appointment of former Australian politician Gary Gray as Australia's ambassador to Ireland. Gray presented his credentials to the President of Ireland in September 2020.

In 2021, the embassy became the first Australian embassy in the world to permanently fly the Australian Aboriginal flag alongside the Australian flag.

== History ==
The Australian Government established diplomatic relations with Ireland in 1946, and a full embassy was established in 1964.

The first Australian representative (as High Commissioner), William Dignam, arrived in Ireland in December 1946 and established the Australian High Commission at 62 Merrion Square in Dublin, which remained the primary Australian Embassy location until 1955.

In 1955, the embassy moved to 33 Fitzwilliam Square, and in 1970 moved again to Fitzwilton House on Wilton Terrace. Since 2016, the embassy has been in its current location of St Stephen's Green.

== Ambassador's residence ==
"Abbey Lea" in Killiney, south of Dublin, has been the primary residence of all Australian ambassadors since 1965. In 1964, ahead of the formal appointment of the first Australia ambassador to Ireland, the Australian Government purchased "Abbey Lea" for IR£18,000, as substantial Arts and Crafts style mansion on Killiney Hill Road, Killiney, to serve as the ambassador's residence. Built in 1909 by prominent businessman Laurence Ambrose Waldron and designed by architect Laurence Aloysius McDonnell, the house was originally named "Marino" and features stained-glass windows by prominent artist in the arts and crafts movement, Harry Clarke.

== See also ==
- Australia–Ireland relations
- Foreign relations of Ireland
- List of diplomatic missions in Ireland
- List of ambassadors of Australia to Ireland
