= John Herron (Australian politician) =

Australian politician (1932–2019)

The Honourable John Herron AO
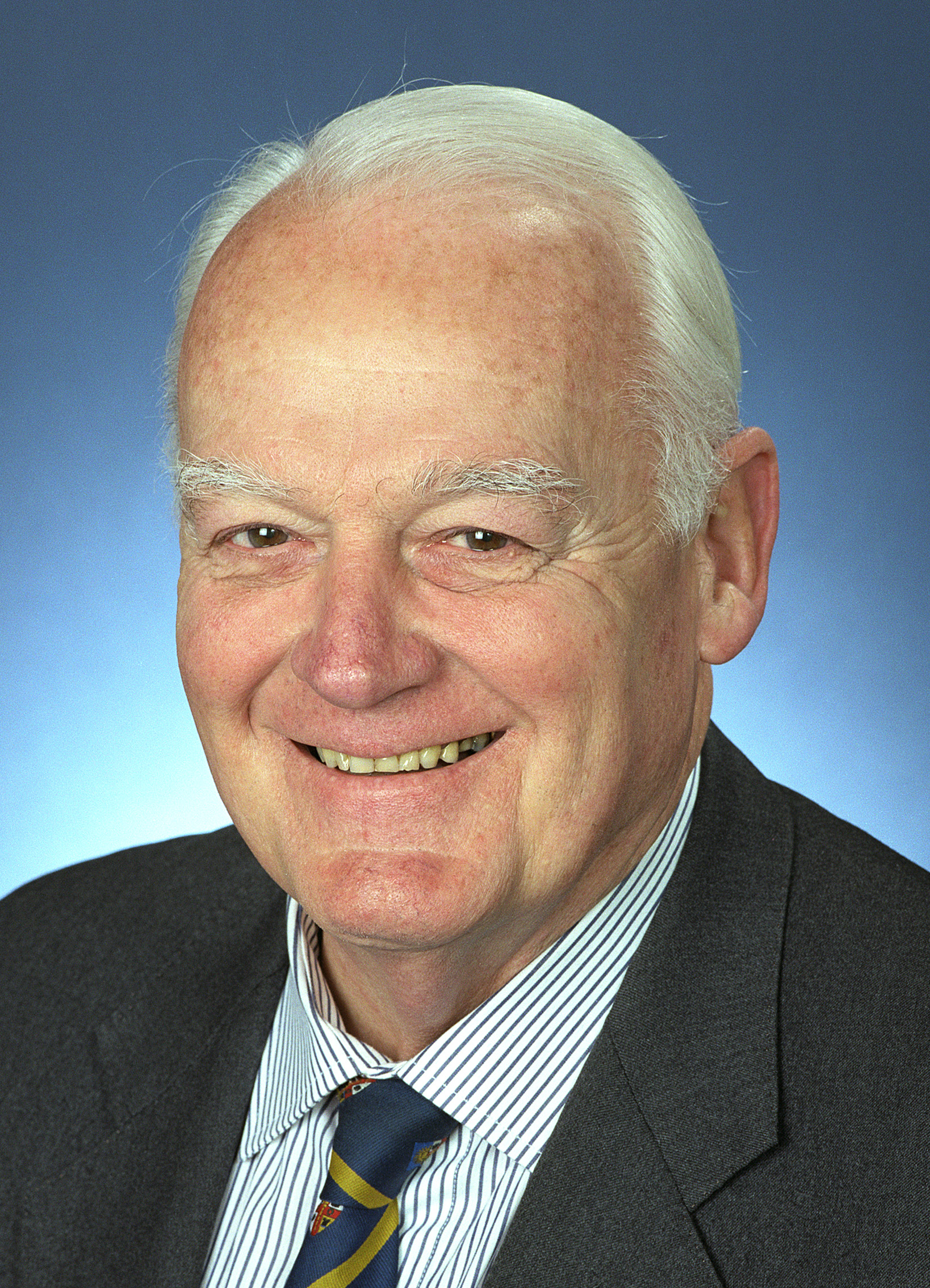

Minister for Aboriginal and Torres Strait Islander Affairs
- In office 11 March 1996 – 30 January 2001
- Prime Minister: John Howard
- Preceded by: Robert Tickner
- Succeeded by: Philip Ruddock

Senator for Queensland
- In office 1 July 1990 – 5 September 2002
- Succeeded by: Santo Santoro

Personal details
- Born: 4 September 1932 Home Hill, Queensland, Australia
- Died: 25 February 2019 (aged 86)
- Party: Liberal
- Spouse: Jan Herron
- Education: University of Queensland
- Occupation: Medical doctor

John Joseph Herron AO (4 September 1932 – 25 February 2019) was an Australian politician, ambassador and surgeon who was a Liberal member of the Australian Senate from 1990 to 2002, representing Queensland. From 1996 to 2001 he was the Minister for Aboriginal and Torres Strait Islander Affairs. From 2002 to 2006 he was the Australian Ambassador to Ireland and the Holy See.

== Medical career ==
Herron was educated at the University of Queensland where he graduated in medicine and surgery. He received registrar training at Royal Brisbane Hospital and Princess Alexandra Hospital. He was a Fellow of the Royal Australasian College of Surgeons, The Royal College of Surgeons England, The Royal College of Surgeons of Edinburgh and the Australian Medical Association. He was also chief surgeon at Mater Misericordiae Hospital in Brisbane, before embarking on his political career.

In 1989, Herron was appointed the Queensland branch President of the Australian Medical Association. He has also been Chairman of the Royal Australasian College of Surgeons and Chairman of the Australian Association of Surgeons of Queensland. He was an officer in the Royal Australian Army Medical Corps and a squadron leader in the Royal Australian Air Force.

== Politics ==
Herron was president of the Queensland branch of the Liberal Party from 1980 to 1984. In 1990, he ran for the Senate, successfully gaining a Queensland seat. He was one of a group of Coalition members of parliament who founded the Lyons Forum, a conservative ginger group. In 1994, he became Parliamentary Secretary to the Shadow Minister for Health and Chairman of the Senate Community Affairs References Committee. When the Coalition government was elected in 1996, Herron was appointed as Minister for Aboriginal and Torres Strait Islander Affairs, until he was replaced by Philip Ruddock in a January 2001 ministerial reshuffle.

In April 2000 a scandal occurred while he was Aboriginal Affairs Minister in the Howard Government. Herron tabled a report in the Australian Parliament that questioned whether or not there ever actually had been a "Stolen Generation", on the semantic distinction that as "at the most only 10% of Aboriginal children" has been removed, they did not constitute an entire "generation".

The Stolen Generation affair was soon parodied in a web-based game that invited users to virtually steal his ten children, and in reply Herron threatened the producers of the game (Russ Weakley and Peter Firminger) with legal action in the Supreme Court of Queensland.

This is to formally let you know that I am instituting proceedings against you for defamation in the Supreme Court of Queensland. The Federal Police will be involved to track this website if I do not receive a response within 24 hours. – John Herron Minister for A.T.S.I. Affairs

Herron was admonished by Electronic Frontiers Australia: "In a free society, it is completely unacceptable for politicians to use threats of legal action to silence their critics," said EFA Board member, Dale Clapperton. "Senator Herron has completely overreacted to a humorous parody of his handling of the 'Stolen Generation' issue."

Herron had no further response or action regarding the legal threat; the affair remained a significant moment in his political career.

Herron became president of the Queensland Liberals again between 2001 and 2002.

Herron successfully recontested his Senate seat in the 2001 election, but resigned a year later to be appointed to a diplomatic posting to Ireland as the Australian Ambassador to Ireland and the Holy See.

On his return to Australia, Herron was appointed chairman of the Australian National Council on Drugs, and The Royal Brisbane and Women's Hospital Foundation.

== Honours and awards ==
Herron was a Knight Commander of the Order of the Holy Sepulchre of Jerusalem, and during his tenure as Australian Ambassador to Ireland and the Holy See was made a Papal Knight of St Gregory.

On 11 June 2012, he was named an Officer of the Order of Australia for "distinguished service to the Parliament of Australia, to international relations through diplomatic and humanitarian roles, to professional medical associations, and to the community." Herron was awarded the Bancroft Medal of the A.M.A. (QLD), the Justin Fleming Medal of the Australian Association of Surgeons, and a Citation by the Royal Australasian College of Surgeons.

In 1994, he worked as a volunteer doctor in Rwanda, where he saw the aftermath of some of the atrocities committed there, an experience that would lead him to push strongly for Australia's support for the creation of the International Criminal Court. On 2 May 2000 he received the Humanitarian Overseas Medal for his service as a Care Australia medical officer during the Rwandan crisis and the Australian Service Medal.

On 4 May 2012, he was awarded Australian Catholic University's highest honour, Doctor of the University.

== Death ==
Herron died on 25 February 2019, aged 86. A State Funeral was held at the Cathedral of St Stephen in Brisbane on 1 March.

Political offices
Preceded by Robert Tickner	Minister for Aboriginal and Torres Strait Islander Affairs; 1996–2001	Succeeded by Philip Ruddock
Diplomatic posts
Preceded by Bob Halverson	Australian Ambassador to the Holy See and Australian Ambassador to Ireland; 2003–06	Succeeded by Anne Plunkett
