= Patricia Holmes (diplomat) =

Australian diplomat

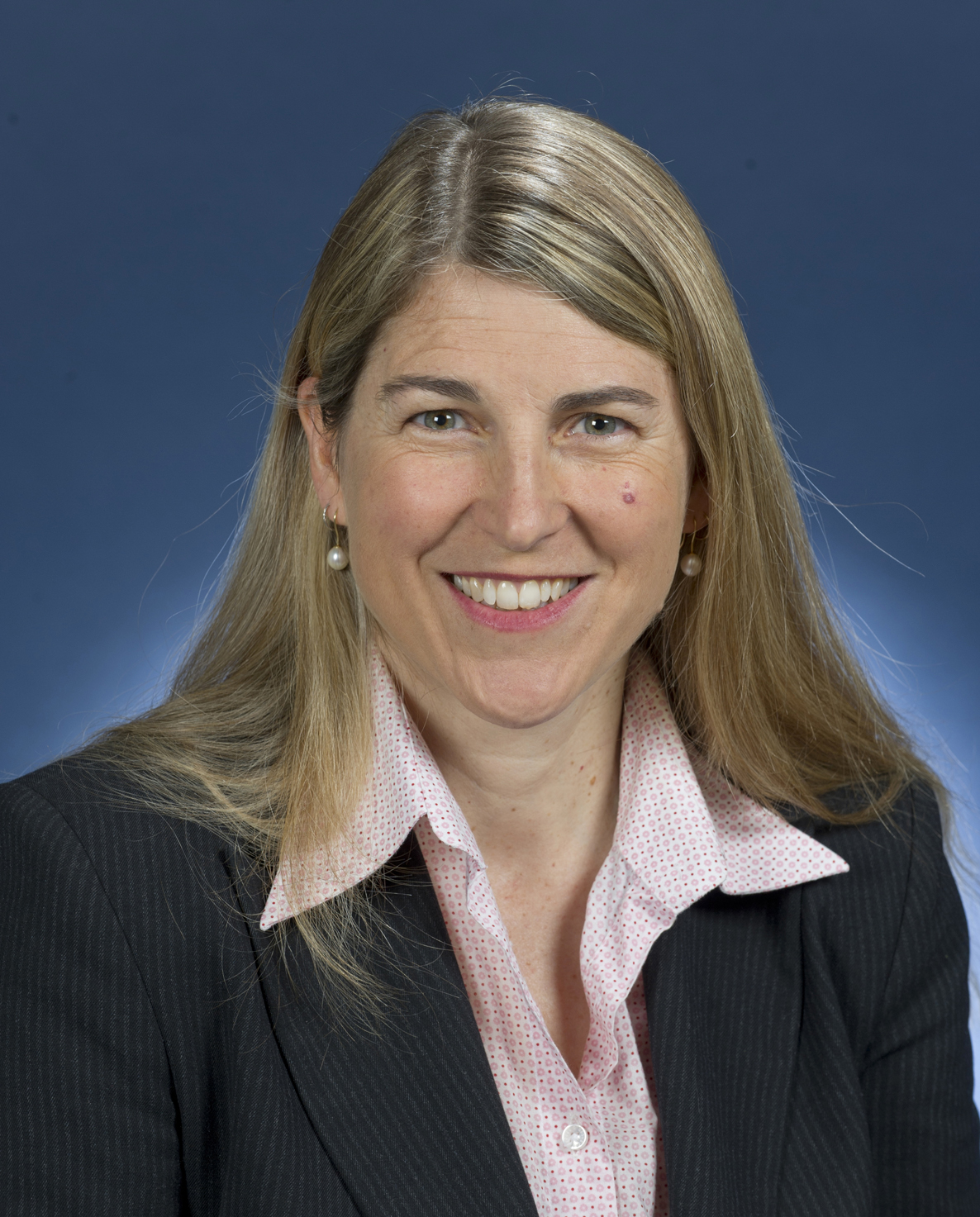
- Patricia Holmes (2011)
- Education: Macquarie University
- Occupations: Public servant and diplomat

Patricia Ann Holmes is an Australian diplomat and is an officer with the Department of Foreign Affairs and Trade.

On 13 September 2011, Acting Foreign Minister Craig Emerson announced the appointment of Holmes as Australia's ambassador to Argentina; with concurrent non-resident accreditation to Paraguay and Uruguay. She presented her credentials to President of Argentina Cristina Fernández de Kirchner on 10 April 2012.

Prior to her appointment to Argentina, Holmes was assistant secretary, Legal Counsel Branch, a position she held since April 2010. Holmes has served previously in Geneva WTO (counsellor 2006-2009), Papua New Guinea (first secretary 1998-2000) and Vanuatu (third, later second, secretary 1994-1996).

Holmes holds a Bachelor of Science with a Bachelor of Law degree from Macquarie University; a Graduate Diploma in legal studies from the University of Technology, Sydney; a Masters of Arts in foreign affairs and trade and a Master of Laws in environmental law from the Australian National University. Holmes was admitted to the Bar of New South Wales and the Australian Capital Territory in 1992. Holmes speaks Spanish. She has a partner and three children.

Diplomatic posts
Preceded by John Richardson	Australian Ambassador to Argentina; 2011 – 2014	Succeeded by Noel Campbell
