= List of ambassadors of Australia to Argentina =

Ambassador of Australia to Argentina

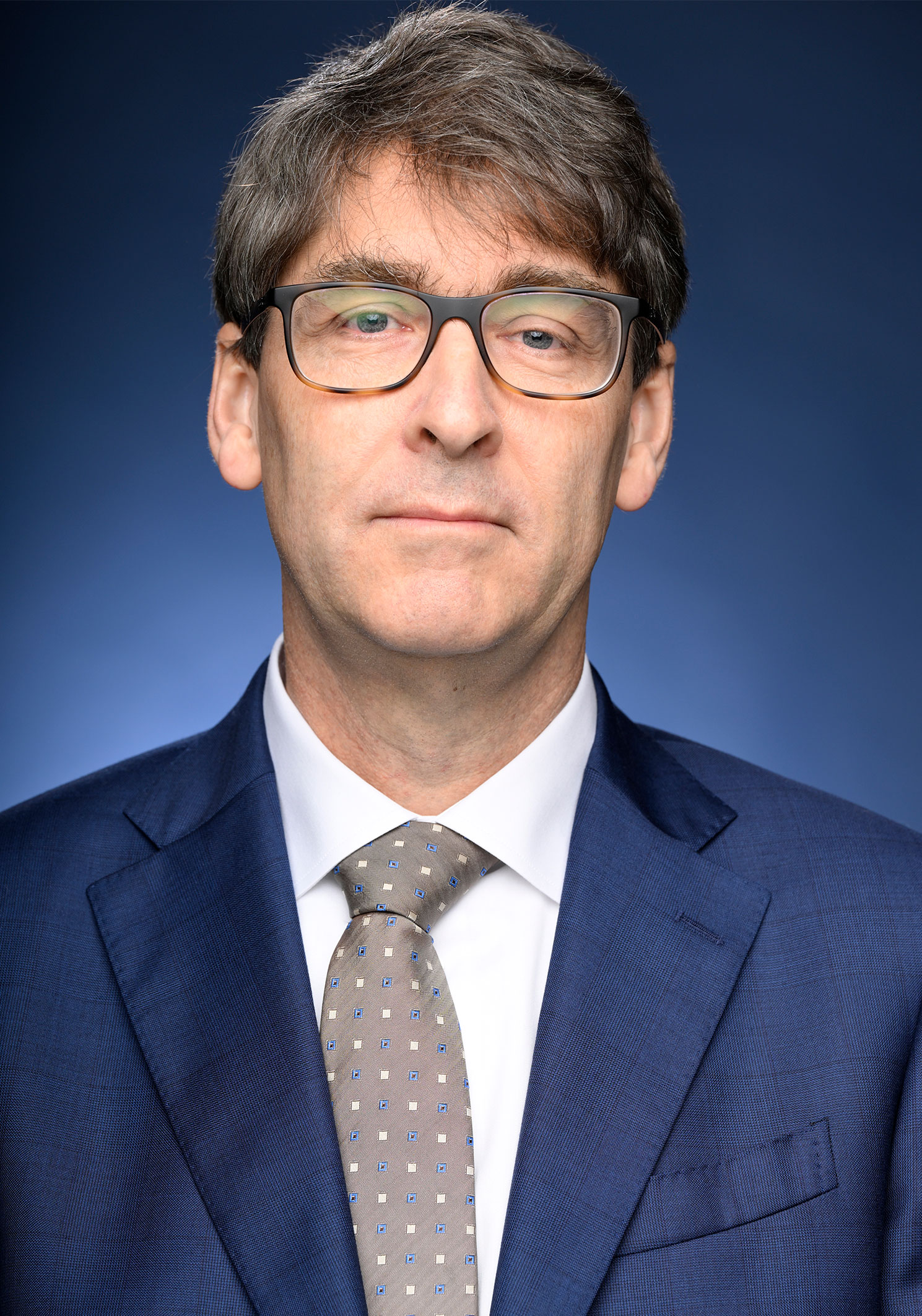
- Incumbent; Simon Twisk since 30 September 2022
- Department of Foreign Affairs and Trade
- Style: His Excellency
- Reports to: Minister for Foreign Affairs
- Residence: Buenos Aires
- Nominator: Prime Minister of Australia
- Appointer: Governor-General of Australia
- Inaugural holder: Kevin Kelly (as Ambassador)
- Formation: 1964

The Ambassador of Australia to Argentina is an officer of the Australian Department of Foreign Affairs and Trade and the head of the Embassy of the Commonwealth of Australia to the Argentine Republic. The ambassador since October 2018 is Brett Hackett, who resides in Buenos Aires.

== List of heads of mission ==
Ordinal	Officeholder	Title	Term start date	Term end date	Time in office	Notes
(n/a)	Harry Bullock	Chargé d'affaires	1962	1963	0–1 years	
1	Kevin Kelly	Ambassador of Australia to Argentina	1964	1967	2–3 years	
2	Dan Mackinnon	Ambassador of Australia to Argentina	1967	1970	2–3 years	
3	Harry Bullock	Ambassador of Australia to Argentina	1970	1973	2–3 years	
4	Hugh Dunn	Ambassador of Australia to Argentina	1973	1976	2–3 years	
(3)	Harry Bullock	Ambassador of Australia to Argentina	1976	1979	2–3 years	
5	Malcolm Dan	Ambassador of Australia to Argentina	1980	1985	4–5 years	
6	Keith Douglas-Scott	Ambassador of Australia to Argentina	1985	1989	3–4 years	
7	Robert Robertson	Ambassador of Australia to Argentina	1989	1992	2–3 years	
8	Richard Wyndham	Ambassador of Australia to Argentina	1992	1996	3–4 years	
9	Warwick Weemaes	Ambassador of Australia to Argentina	1996	1998	1–2 years	
10	Martine Letts	Ambassador of Australia to Argentina	1998	2000	1–2 years	
11	Sharyn Minahan	Ambassador of Australia to Argentina	2000	2004	3–4 years	
12	Peter Hussin	Ambassador of Australia to Argentina	2004	2008	3–4 years	
13	John Richardson	Ambassador of Australia to Argentina	2008	2011	2–3 years	
14	Patricia Holmes	Ambassador of Australia to Argentina	2011	2014	2–3 years	
15	Noel Campbell	Ambassador of Australia to Argentina	2014	2018	3–4 years	
16	Brett Hackett	Ambassador of Australia to Argentina	22 October 2018	2023	7 years, 320 days	

== See also ==
- Argentina–Australia relations
