= List of ambassadors of Australia to Ireland =

Ambassador of Australia to Ireland

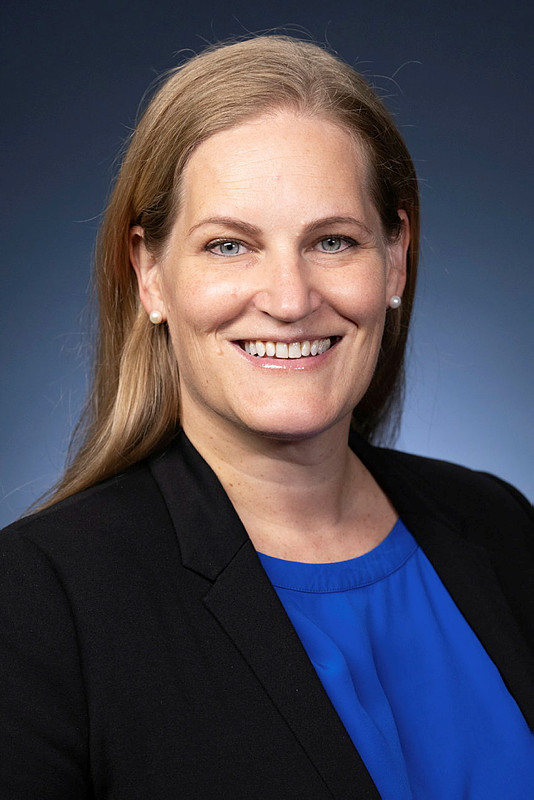
- Incumbent; Chantelle Taylor since April 2025
- Department of Foreign Affairs and Trade
- Style: Her Excellency
- Reports to: Minister for Foreign Affairs
- Residence: Abbey Lea, Killiney
- Seat: Embassy of Australia, Dublin
- Nominator: Prime Minister of Australia
- Appointer: Governor-General of Australia
- Inaugural holder: William Dignam (High Commissioner)
- Formation: 4 December 1946
- Website: Australian Embassy, Ireland

The Ambassador of Australia to Ireland is an officer of the Australian Department of Foreign Affairs and Trade and the head of the Embassy of the Commonwealth of Australia to Ireland in Dublin. Prior to the establishment of a resident embassy in Rome in 2008, on occasions the position has also had non-resident accreditation as Australia's Ambassador to the Holy See.

On 9 March 2025, the Australian Government announced the appointment of Chantelle Taylor as Australia's ambassador to Ireland. Taylor took up office in April 2025 and presented her credentials to the President of Ireland on 27 May 2025.

== Posting history ==
Formal diplomatic relations between Ireland and Australia were first established in 1945 by Taoiseach Éamon de Valera and Prime Minister Ben Chifley, with an agreement to exchange representatives. Ireland sent Thomas J. Kiernan as its first envoy to Australia on 15 October 1946, and on 9 April 1946, Australia announced the appointment of barrister William Dignam as High Commissioner in Dublin, who took up his appointment from 4 December 1946.

However, given Ireland's ambiguous status within the British Commonwealth after 1945, the title of the diplomatic postings and any letters of credence remained similarly ambiguous. In July 1945, when asked about whether he would make Ireland a republic, de Valera replied that "we are a republic", and the Irish government announced its unease with any wording that emphasised its connection with the Commonwealth. Therefore, although Keirnan was officially appointed to Australia as a "High Commissioner" (the standard title for representatives between members of the Commonwealth), De Valera signed the letters of credence to the Australian Governor-General with Keirnan's title as the "Minister Plenipotentiary Representative of Ireland to Australia". Keirnan's status was accepted and embraced by the Labor Party government in Canberra at the time, with the Minister for External Affairs, H. V. Evatt, having a good relationship with Keirnan. De Valera later accepted a compromise for the appointment of Dignam with credentials appointing him as the "Representative of Australia" and "Australian High Commissioner". Dignam arrived in Ireland in December 1946 and established the Australian High Commission at 62 Merrion Square in Dublin.

However, despite a promising early start to the relationship, issues arose once the Irish Government passed The Republic of Ireland Act 1948, which came into effect from 18 April 1949, and finally severed any last links between Ireland, the British monarchy, and the Commonwealth. With the replacement of Chifley's government with the conservative Liberal-Country Coalition government of Robert Menzies in December 1949, Dignam was soon recalled from Dublin in April 1950, and in September 1950 the two governments agreed to upgrade the two posts to the status of embassy. However, the new government nevertheless conveyed a greater degree of reluctance go any further, with new external affairs minister, Percy Spender, only agreeing to the appointment of a Chargé d'affaires (which did not require the exchange of official credentials) instead of an ambassador, with William Wynes taking up the appointment.

In April 1953, Minister for External Affairs Richard Casey announced the appointment of Paul McGuire as the first Australian Ambassador to Ireland, saying that the Department of External Affairs was "inadequate in sufficiently senior and experienced career personnel to fill all the Australian posts abroad," and that it was necessary to draw on experienced people from outside the department to fill some overseas posts. However, McGuire did not formally take up his post due to a protracted dispute between the Australian and Irish governments about the style of his credentials, with the Australian Government of the view that the term "Ireland" or "Republic of Ireland" ignored the status of Northern Ireland as part of the United Kingdom and implied a recognition of a united Ireland, and thus wanting for McGuire's title to be an "Ambassador to the Irish Republic" or "to Dublin", while the Irish Government wanted his title to be ambassador "to Ireland" or "to the President of the Republic of Ireland". No agreement was secured between the two governments. With the Australian Government of the view that the "cost of the post has not been warranted because of the small amount of diplomatic activity between Canberra and Dublin", Australia cancelled McGuire's appointment (he would later be appointed to Italy) and continued with the status quo of having a chargé d'affaires, with the Irish Government reciprocating in 1956 by withdrawing the designated ambassador since 1955, Brian Gallagher, and only appointing a resident chargé in Canberra.

The dispute was not resolved until 1964, when the two governments reached an agreement, with the Irish chargé, Dr Eoin MacWhite, appointed "Ambassador of Ireland to the Commonwealth of Australia" on 15 May 1964. This was followed by the Australian external affairs minister, Paul Hasluck, announcing the appointment of Hugh Roberton as the "Ambassador Extraordinary and Plenipotentiary for the Commonwealth of Australia", on 11 January 1965. Roberton presented his credentials to now-president De Valera in Dublin on 17 May 1965.

Since that time, the posting has reflected the growth in relations between Ireland and Australia, facilitating several state visits to Ireland, including Prime Minister Gough Whitlam in 1974, Governor-General Sir William Deane in 1999, and Prime Ministers Bob Hawke, Paul Keating and John Howard, who addressed the Dáil Éireann in 1987, 1993, and 2006, respectively.

The position has regularly been filled in the past by former politicians (including Gary Gray, John Herron, Brian Burke, Bob Halverson and Vince Gair). Brian Burke resigned from office in July 1991 following allegations of official corruption and the commencement of the WA Inc royal commission relating to his time as premier of Western Australia.

=== The 'Gair Affair' ===
On 1 April 1974, Democratic Labor Party (DLP) Senator and former Labor Party premier of Queensland, Vince Gair, was appointed ambassador by the Labor Party Government of Gough Whitlam, ostensibly in order improve the government's chances of winning an additional Queensland seat in the Senate at the following election. However, when Gair delayed his formal resignation, and the conservative Queensland Government confounded this scheme by issuing writs for five rather than six Senate places, the situation (known as the "Gair Affair") resulted in the opposition and the DLP trying to block supply. Whitlam responded to this by obtaining a double dissolution election in May 1974, which saw the government returned and the defeat of all DLP senators. Gair's term as ambassador proved to be short lived and just as tumultuous, with Gair being described as "not suited to diplomacy. He refused his officials' advice, antagonised the Irish Department of Foreign Affairs and his fellow heads of mission, [and] his inappropriate behaviour also led to the resignation of some female members of staff". Gair was never well-liked by the opposition Liberal-County Coalition, having been outspoken in his criticisms on domestic politics and the Liberal opposition, and when Whitlam's government was replaced by the Liberal Opposition in November 1975, Prime Minister Malcolm Fraser advised Gair that his appointment had been terminated and announced his recall on 21 January 1976.

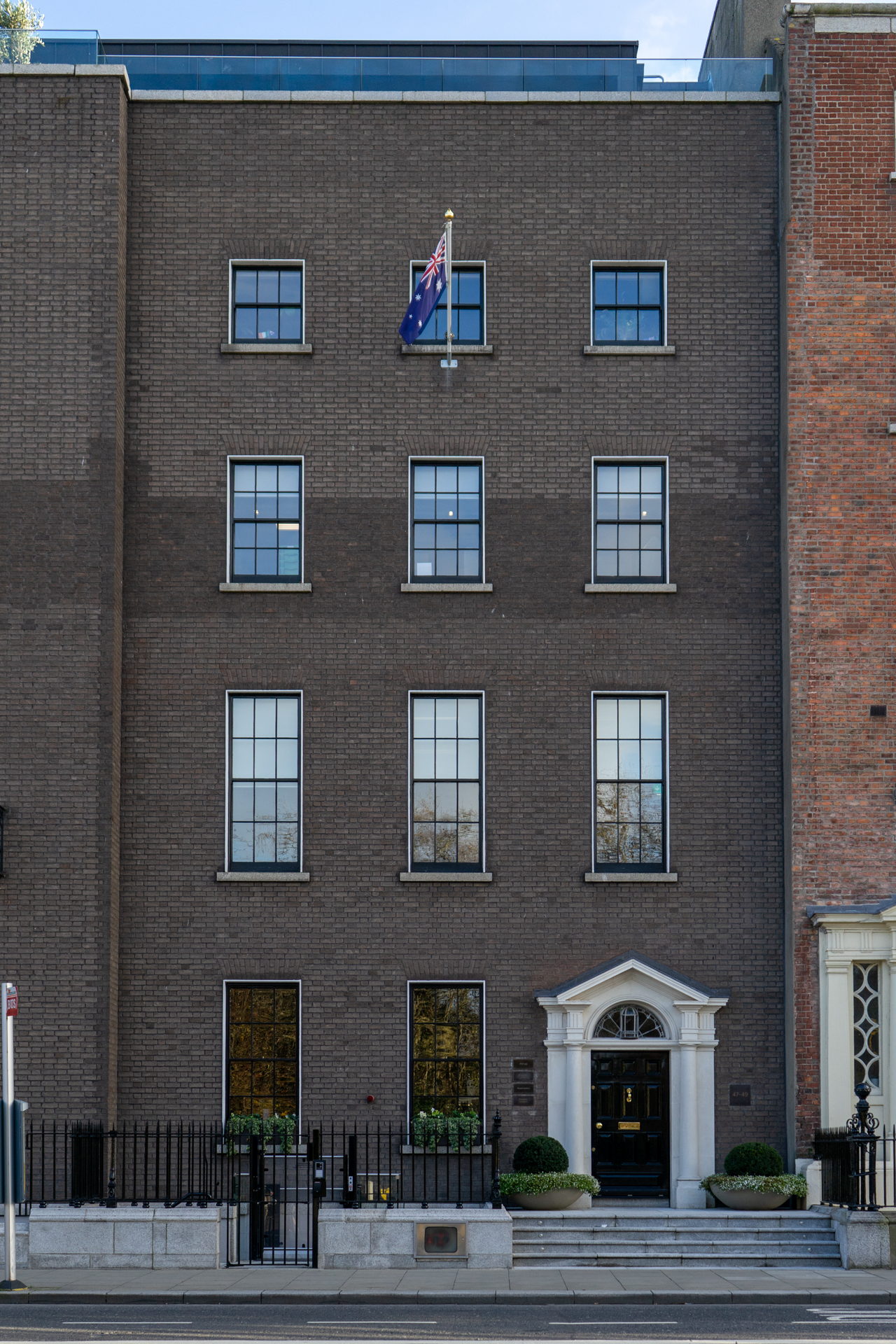
The Australian Embassy, located since 2016 on St Stephen's Green, Dublin.

== List of heads of mission ==
#	Officeholder	Title	Other offices	Term start date	Term end date	Time in office	Notes
1	William John Dignam	High Commissioner	N/A	4 December 1946	May 1950	3 years, 4 months	
–	William Anstey Wynes	Chargé d'affaires	N/A	September 1950	April 1952	1 year, 7 months	
–	Noël Deschamps	Chargé d'affaires	N/A	April 1952	January 1953	9 months	
–	William Torrance Doig	Chargé d'affaires	N/A	January 1953	15 May 1956	3 years, 4 months	
Credentials for Paul McGuire not offered/received due to title dispute (24 April 1953 – 14 January 1954)
–	Stewart Jamieson	Chargé d'affaires	N/A	15 May 1956	29 November 1957	1 year, 198 days	
–	Noël Deschamps	Chargé d'affaires	N/A	7 February 1958	18 March 1961	3 years, 39 days	
–	June Hyett Barnett	Chargé d'affaires	N/A	18 March 1961	15 April 1961	28 days	
–	H. Douglas White	Chargé d'affaires	N/A	15 April 1961	12 July 1963	2 years, 88 days	
–	Richard H. Gilman	Chargé d'affaires	N/A	12 July 1963	27 February 1965	1 year, 230 days	
–	Ivor Gordon Bowden	Chargé d'affaires	N/A	27 February 1965	May 1965	2 months	
2	Hugh Roberton	Ambassador	N/A	May 1965	26 April 1968	2 years, 11 months	
–	K. I. Gates	Chargé d'affaires	N/A	26 April 1968	October 1969	1 year, 5 months	
3	Ralph Honner	Ambassador	N/A	October 1969	January 1972	2 years, 3 months	
4	Keith Brennan	Ambassador	N/A	January 1972	June 1974	2 years, 5 months	
5	Vince Gair	Ambassador	N/A	June 1974	March 1976	1 year, 9 months	
6	Brian Hill	Ambassador	N/A	March 1976	August 1978	2 years, 5 months	
7	Ruth Dobson	Ambassador	N/A	August 1978	September 1982	4 years, 1 month	
8	Lloyd Thomson	Ambassador	^{A}	September 1982	September 1983	1 year	
9	Sir Peter Lawler	Ambassador	^{A}	September 1983	December 1986	3 years, 3 months	
10	Frank Milne	Ambassador	N/A	December 1986	August 1988	1 year, 8 months	
11	Brian Burke^{B}	Ambassador	^{A}	5 June 1988	31 July 1991	3 years, 56 days	
12	Terence Barry McCarthy	Ambassador	^{A}	August 1991	December 1994	3 years, 4 months	
13	Edward John Stevens	Ambassador	^{A}	December 1994	December 1998	4 years	
14	Bob Halverson	Ambassador	^{A}	February 1999	December 2002	3 years, 10 months	
15	John Herron	Ambassador	^{A}	January 2003	March 2006	3 years, 2 months	
16	Anne Plunkett	Ambassador	^{A}	March 2006	December 2009	3 years, 9 months	
17	Bruce Davis	Ambassador	N/A	December 2009	December 2012	3 years	
18	Ruth Adler	Ambassador	N/A	January 2013	September 2016	3 years, 8 months	
19	Richard Andrews	Ambassador	N/A	September 2016	February 2020	3 years, 5 months	
–	Robert Owen-Jones	Chargé d'affaires	N/A	February 2020	August 2020	6 months	
20	Gary Gray	Ambassador	N/A	August 2020	September 2024	4 years, 1 month	
-	Lachlan Crews	Chargé d'affaires		September 2024	April 2025	6 months	
21	Chantelle Taylor	Ambassador		April 2025	Incumbent		

=== Notes ===
^A Also non-resident Ambassador of Australia to the Holy See.
^B In April 1991, Burke resigned as ambassador with effect from 31 July 1991 in order to face a royal commission and was eventually jailed.
