= Alan Watt (diplomat) =

Australian diplomat

Sir Alan Watt CBE
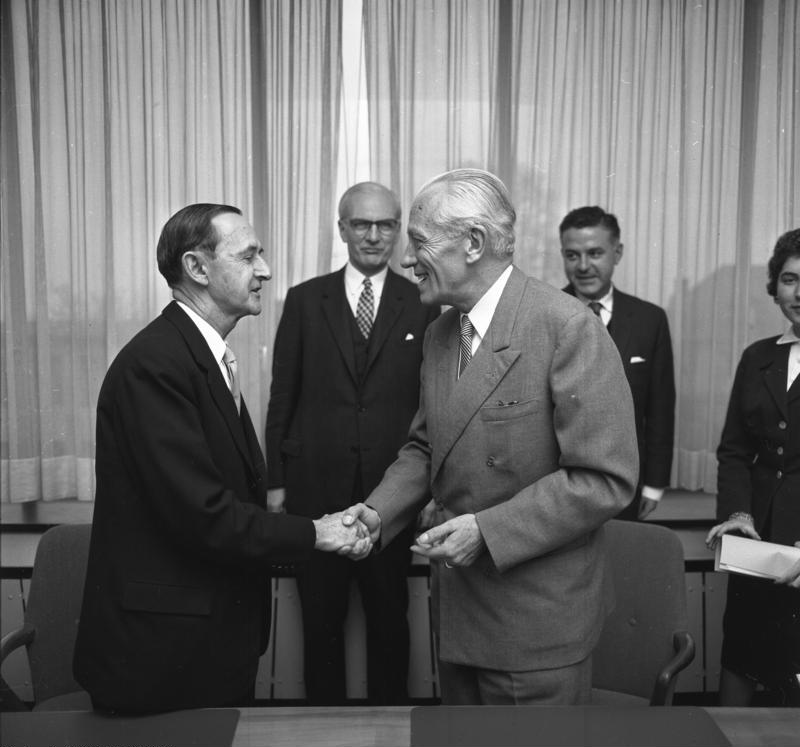
- Watt (left) meeting German diplomats

Secretary of the Department of External Affairs
- In office 19 June 1950 – 24 January 1954

Personal details
- Born: Alan Stewart Watt; 13 April 1901 Croydon, New South Wales
- Died: 18 September 1988 (aged 87) Aranda, Australian Capital Territory
- Spouse: Mildred Mary Wait (m. 1927; died 1983)
- Children: 4, including John Watt
- Education: University of Sydney; University of Oxford
- Occupation: Public servant, diplomat

Sir Alan Stewart Watt CBE (13 April 1901 – 18 September 1988) was an Australian diplomat.

== Background and career ==
Born of Scottish heritage, Watt attended Sydney Boys High School. A graduate of the Universities of Sydney and Oxford, he was a New South Wales Rhodes Scholar for 1921. In 1924, he played singles and doubles tennis at Wimbledon as the captain of Oxford.

Watt first joined the Commonwealth Public Service in the Department of External Affairs, in 1937. He served in the United States during World War II and was one of the Australian delegates at the United Nations Conference on International Organization. In 1947 Watt became the Australian minister to the Soviet Union and in 1948 the first Australian Ambassador in Moscow. In 1950 he returned to Australia and was appointed Secretary to the Department and was instrumental in negotiation of the ANZUS and SEATO treaties. He then served as High Commissioner to both Singapore and Southeast Asia (1954–1956), Ambassador to Japan (1956–1960) and Ambassador to Germany (1960–1962). Leaving the Department of Foreign Affairs in 1962, he became a Visiting Fellow of the Australian National University, and Director of the Australian Institute of International Affairs (1963–1969).

He wrote a number of books and articles in retirement, including The Evolution of Australian Foreign Policy 1938–1965 (1967, Cambridge University Press, 67-10782), Vietnam - An Australian Analysis (1968, Melbourne, F. W. Cheshire for Australian Institute of International Relations), and Australian Diplomat - Memoirs of Sir Alan Watt (1972, Angus and Robertson, ISBN 0-207-12354-3).

== Awards and honours ==
Alan Watt was honoured as a Commander of the Order of the British Empire in June 1952, and as a Knight Bachelor in June 1954.

In 2011, a street in the Canberra suburb of Casey was named Alan Watt Crescent in Watt's honour.

== Works ==
- The changing margins of Australian foreign policy, 1964, Australian Institute of International Affairs
- Australian defence policy 1951-63: major international aspects, 1964, Dept. of International Relations, Research School of Pacific Studies, Institute of Advanced Studies, Australian National University
- Vietnam, an Australian analysis, 1968, Cheshire for the Australian Institute of International Affairs
- Australian Diplomat - Memoirs of Sir Alan Watt, 1972, Verlag Angus and Robertson. ISBN 0-207-12354-3

Government offices
Preceded by John Burton	Secretary of the Department of External Affairs; 1950–1954	Succeeded by Arthur Tange
Diplomatic posts
Preceded by Noël Deschamps as Chargé d'Affaires	Australian Minister to The Soviet Union; 1947–1948	Succeeded by Alan Watt as Ambassador to The Soviet Union
Preceded by Alan Watt as Minister to The Soviet Union	Australian Ambassador to The Soviet Union; 1948–1950	Succeeded by Frederick Blakeney as Chargé d'Affaires
Preceded by Laurence McIntyre	Australian Commissioner to Singapore; 1954–1956	Succeeded by Ralph Harry
Preceded by Edward Ronald Walker	Australian Ambassador to Japan; 1956–1960	Succeeded by Laurence McIntyre
Preceded by Patrick Shaw	Australian Ambassador to the Federal Republic of Germany; 1960–1962	Succeeded by Frederick Blakeney
