= Sharyn Minahan =

Australian diplomat

Sharyn Minahan was an Australian ambassador having served as Ambassador to Denmark (non-resident to Norway and Iceland) from 2006 until 2010 and Argentina, Uruguay and Paraguay.
