= Damien Miller =

Australian diplomat

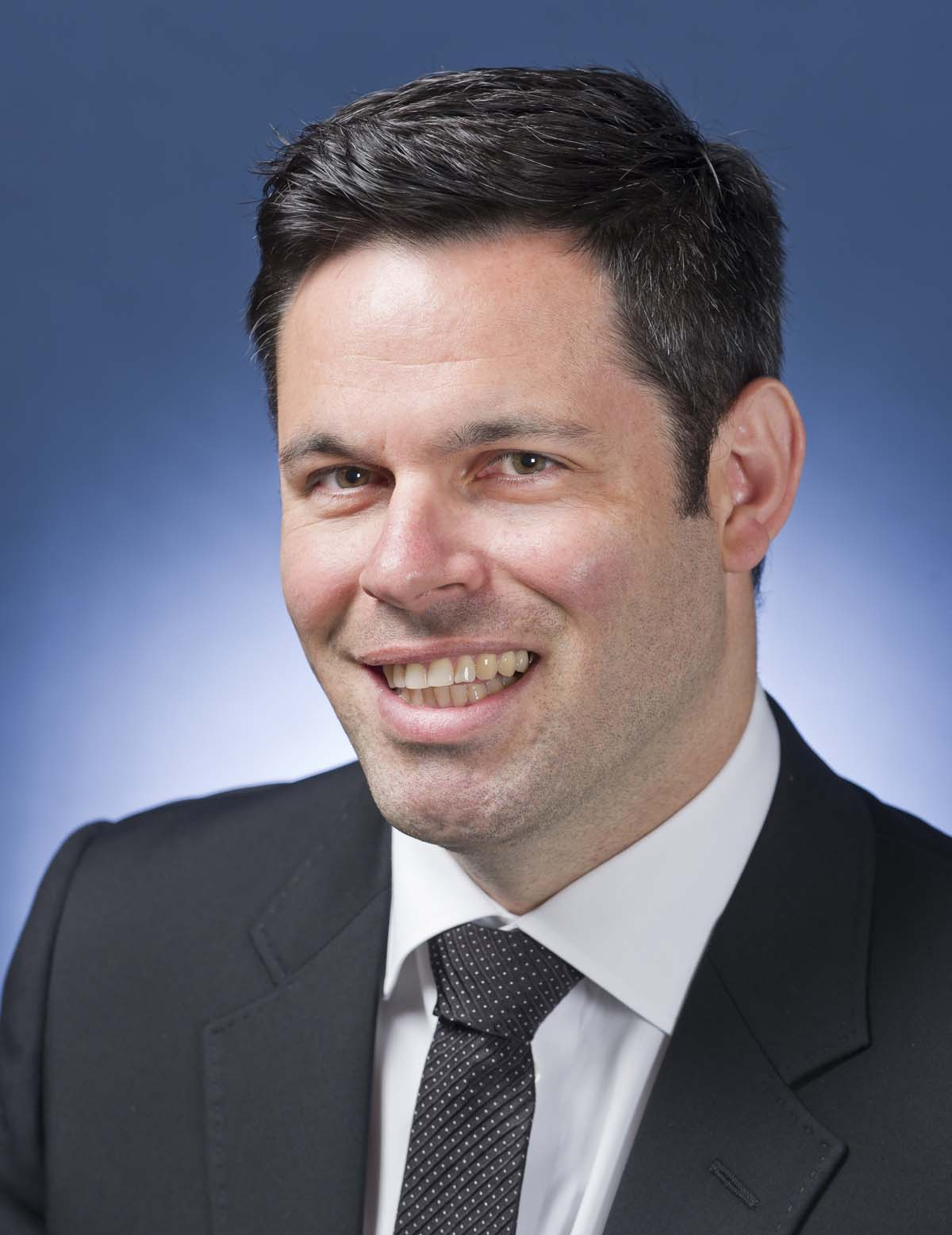
- Damien Miller
- Born: Damien Patrick Miller
- Education: University of New South Wales; Monash University
- Occupation: Diplomat
- Title: Australian Ambassador to Denmark, Iceland and Norway
- Term: May 2013 – April 2017
- Predecessor: James Choi
- Successor: MaryEllen Miller
- Partner: Neill Seeto

Damien Patrick Miller is an Australian career diplomat and the first Indigenous Australian to head an Australian diplomatic mission.

== Early life and education ==
Miller belongs to the Gangulu people from the area of Mount Morgan, near Rockhampton in Central Queensland. In an interview with ABC News Breakfast, Miller said that his grandmother was subjected to the Aboriginals Protection and Restriction of the Sale of Opium Act 1897 and she and many family members moved from the outskirts into Rockhampton, or later moved to Brisbane. Miller was brought up in Brisbane and has strong ties to the traditional country of his people.

In 1993, Miller was recognised as Aboriginal Scholar of the Year by the national NAIDOC committee. He graduated from the University of New South Wales in 1998 with a Bachelor of Arts and Bachelor of Laws. Miller also holds a Diploma in Foreign Affairs and Trade from Monash University.

== Career ==
Whilst studying for his law degree at the University of New South Wales, Miller worked in a commercial law firm in Sydney. In 1995, he joined the Department of Foreign Affairs and Trade (DFAT) as an Indigenous Cadet and worked part-time at the Department during the summer holidays.

After graduating from the University of New South Wales, in 1999 Miller joined DFAT full-time. As a career diplomat, Miller was first posted to the High Commission of Australia to Malaysia, where he served from 2000–2003. Returning to Australia, Miller then served as a desk officer in DFAT's South-East Asia Division from 2003–2006, and then as Director of DFAT Corporate Planning from 2007–2009. In 2009, Miller was then moved to the position of Director in DFAT's Afghanistan Section. In 2010 Miller was appointed as Counsellor and Deputy Head of Mission at the Embassy of Australia to Germany, where he served under Peter Tesch.

On 1 April 2013, Australian Foreign Minister Bob Carr appointed Miller as the new Ambassador of Australia to Denmark, with concurrent accreditation to Iceland and Norway, replacing James Choi. With this appointment, Miller became the first Indigenous Australian to become an Australian head of mission. Miller took up his appointment in May 2013 and presented his credentials to Queen Margrethe II on 14 June 2013. He later presented his credentials to Norwegian King Harald V on 17 October 2013 and to Icelandic President Ólafur Ragnar Grímsson on 7 December 2013.

On his Ambassadorial appointment, Miller noted that the Department employs 49 Indigenous staff with 12 of those employees posted at various Australian diplomatic missions around the world, and that it is "great honour not only for me, but for my family and for Indigenous Australians."

== Personal life ==
Miller is in a same-sex relationship with Neill Seeto.

Diplomatic posts
Preceded by James Choi	Australian Ambassador to Denmark; 2013 –	Incumbent
