= List of ambassadors of Australia to Denmark =

Ambassador of Australia to Denmark

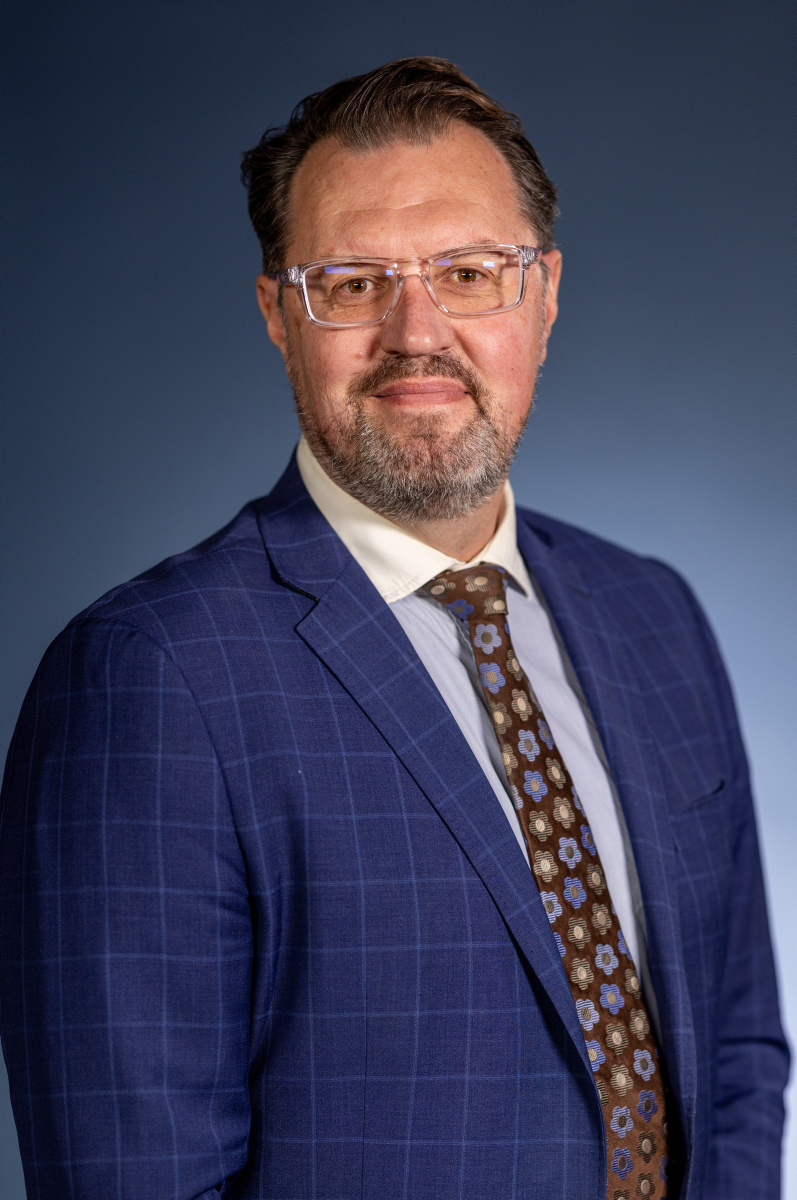
- Incumbent; Dave Vosen since September 2025
- Department of Foreign Affairs and Trade
- Style: His Excellency
- Reports to: Minister for Foreign Affairs
- Residence: Copenhagen
- Nominator: Prime Minister of Australia
- Appointer: Governor-General of Australia
- Inaugural holder: Lloyd Thomson (resident in The Hague)
- Formation: November 1970
- Website: Australian Embassy, Denmark

The Ambassador of Australia to Denmark is an officer of the Australian Department of Foreign Affairs and Trade and the head of the Embassy of the Commonwealth of Australia in Denmark. The Ambassador, since September 2025, is Dave Vosen, who resides in Copenhagen. The ambassador also holds non-resident accreditation for Iceland (1984–1997; since 2000) and Norway (since 2000). Accreditation was also previously held for Latvia and Lithuania following their regaining independence (1991–1997). The embassy was first opened in November 1970, when the existing Consulate-General in Copenhagen was upgraded, and the embassy remained until it was closed in May 1997 due to "budgetary pressures". While accreditation passed to the Australian Embassy in Sweden in the period after that, the embassy was reopened May 2000.

== List of heads of mission ==
| Ordinal | Name | Title | Other offices | Residency | Term start date | Term end date | Time in office | Notes |
|---|---|---|---|---|---|---|---|---|
| 1 | Lloyd Thomson | Ambassador of Australia to Denmark | | The Hague, Netherlands | November 1970 | 1971 | 0–1 years | |
| (n/a) | Gerald Harding | Chargé d'affaires | | Copenhagen, Denmark | 1971 | 1974 | 2–3 years | |
| 2 | Ruth Dobson | Ambassador of Australia to Denmark | ^{A} | Copenhagen, Denmark | 1974 | 1978 | 3–4 years | |
| 3 | James Humphreys | Ambassador of Australia to Denmark | ^{A} | Copenhagen, Denmark | 1978 | 1980 | 1–2 years | |
| 4 | Ronald Walker | Ambassador of Australia to Denmark | ^{A} | Copenhagen, Denmark | 1980 | 1983 | 2–3 years | |
| 5 | Anthony Dingle | Ambassador of Australia to Denmark | ^{A} | Copenhagen, Denmark | 1983 | 1987 | 3–4 years | |
| 6 | Jeffrey Benson | Ambassador of Australia to Denmark | ^{A} | Copenhagen, Denmark | 1987 | 1991 | 3–4 years | |
| 7 | John Burgess | Ambassador of Australia to Denmark | ^{A}^{B}^{C} | Copenhagen, Denmark | 4 March 1991 | April 1995 | 4 years | |
| 8 | Garry Conroy | Ambassador of Australia to Denmark | ^{A}^{B}^{C} | Copenhagen, Denmark | April 1995 | May 1997 | 2 years, 1 month | |
| 9 | Judith Pead | Ambassador of Australia to Denmark | | Stockholm, Sweden | May 1997 | 1999 | 1–2 years | |
| 10 | Stephen Brady | Ambassador of Australia to Denmark | | Stockholm, Sweden | 1999 | May 2000 | 0–1 years | |
| 11 | Malcolm Leader | Ambassador of Australia to Denmark | ^{A}^{D} | Copenhagen, Denmark | May 2000 | 2003 | 2–3 years | |
| (n/a) | Charles Stuart | Chargé d'affaires | | Copenhagen, Denmark | 2003 | 2003 | 0 years | |
| 12 | Matthew Peek | Ambassador of Australia to Denmark | ^{A}^{D} | Copenhagen, Denmark | 2003 | 2006 | 2–3 years | |
| 13 | Sharyn Minahan | Ambassador of Australia to Denmark | ^{A}^{D} | Copenhagen, Denmark | 2006 | 2010 | 3–4 years | |
| 14 | James Choi | Ambassador of Australia to Denmark | ^{A}^{D} | Copenhagen, Denmark | 2010 | 2013 | 2–3 years | |
| 15 | Damien Miller | Ambassador of Australia to Denmark | ^{A}^{D} | Copenhagen, Denmark | 2013 | 11 April 2017 | 3–4 years | |
| 16 | MaryEllen Miller | Ambassador of Australia to Denmark | ^{A}^{D} | Copenhagen, Denmark | 11 April 2017 | December 2020 | 3 years, 7 months | |
| (n/a) | Asmeret Kidane | Chargé d'affaires | | Copenhagen, Denmark | August 2021 | August 2021 | 0–1 years | |
| 17 | Kerin Ayyalaraju | Ambassador of Australia to Denmark | ^{A}^{D} | Copenhagen, Denmark | August 2021 | September 2025 | 4 years, 1 month | |
| 18 | Dave Vosen | Ambassador of Australia to Denmark | ^{A}^{D} | Copenhagen, Denmark | September 2025 | incumbent | 1 year | |

=== Notes ===
^A Also non-resident Ambassador to the Republic of Iceland, 1984–1997; since 2000.
^B Also non-resident Ambassador to the Republic of Latvia, 1991–1997.
^C Also non-resident Ambassador to the Republic of Lithuania, 1991–1997.
^D Also non-resident Ambassador to the Kingdom of Norway, since 2000.
