= John McMillan (diplomat) =

Australian diplomat (1914–1999)

- Born: John Mill McMillan; December 1914
- Died: 25 November 1999 (aged 84)
- Education: University of Melbourne (BA (Hons))
- Occupations: Public servant, diplomat
- Spouse: Beatrice Scobie (m. 1948)
- Children: Margaret

John Mill McMillan (December 1914 – 25 November 1999) was an Australian public servant and diplomat.

During his career, he held several prominent diplomatic posts, including Australian Ambassador to Israel (1960–1963); Brazil (1965–1970); Turkey (1973–1976); and the Holy See (1974–1978) and High Commissioner to Ghana (1970–1973) and Malta (1976–1978).

== Life and career ==
McMillan, whose father was an employee at the Victorian Public Works Department, was educated at Mentone Grammar School and Melbourne Grammar School. He attended the University of Melbourne, living at Trinity College and in 1934 was awarded a Bachelor of Arts degree, with honours, having won the Wyselaskie Scholarship in Modern Languages that year also. He later completed a Master of Arts and while in Canberra he graduated with a Bachelor of Laws.

In 1937, McMillan joined the Department of External Affairs, appointed through the Melbourne University Appointments Board as a third secretary. His first posting, in 1941, was to the United States, working as third secretary to then Australian Ambassador to the United States Richard Casey. He departed Washington in 1943 to serve as second secretary in Moscow, before returning to Canberra in 1946.

McMillan married Betty Scobie, also an officer of the Department of External Affairs, at All Saints Church in Hunter's Hill on 10 January 1948. Colin Moodie was McMillan's best man. The day after his wedding McMillan and his new wife left Sydney for Karachi, for McMillan take up a posting as first secretary.

In October 1949, McMillan was appointed to a first secretary position in Paris, France. From 1951 to 1953 McMillan was Chargé d'affaires in Moscow.

McMillan served as Australian Ambassador to Israel from 1960 to 1963, returning to Canberra before a posting to Brazil from 1965 to 1970.

Between 1970 and 1973, McMillan was Australian High Commissioner to Ghana (1970–1973) and (1976–1978).

McMillan was Ambassador to Turkey, resident in Ankara, from 1973 to 1976. In 1974, during his Ankara posting, McMillan was additionally appointed Ambassador to the Holy See and began making period visits to the Vatican. In 1976, McMillan was appointed Australian High Commissioner to Malta. He retained his position as Ambassador to the Holy See, visiting from Malta.

Diplomatic posts
Preceded by Frederick Blakeney as Chargé d'affaires	Australian Ambassador to the Soviet Union (Chargé d'affaires); 1951–1953	Succeeded by Brian Hill as Chargé d'affaires
Preceded by Bertram Ballard	Australian Minister to Israel; 1960	Succeeded by John Hood
Preceded by Bertram Ballard	Australian Ambassador to Israel; 1960–1963	Succeeded by John Hood
Preceded by Rodney Hodgson as Chargé d'affaires	Australian Ambassador to Brazil; 1965–1970	Succeeded by Frederick Homer
Preceded by Richard Woolcott	Australian High Commissioner to Ghana; 1970–1973	Succeeded by David Evans
Preceded by Alan McNicoll	Australian Ambassador to Turkey; 1973–1976	Succeeded by Roy Peachey
Preceded by Lloyd Thomson	Australian Ambassador to the Holy See; 1974–1978	Succeeded by John Mitchell Kirtley
Preceded by Ian Nicholson	Australian High Commissioner to Malta; 1976–1978	Succeeded by Geoffrey Pretyman as Acting High Commissioner
