= Lloyd Thomson =

Australian public servant and diplomat

- Born: 22 May 1919; Footscray, Victoria
- Died: 26 August 2015 (aged 96)
- Education: University of Melbourne
- Occupations: Public servant, diplomat

Lloyd Thomson LVO (22 May 1919 – 26 August 2015) was an Australian public servant and diplomat. He also co-wrote the book and lyrics of the successful Australian musical The Sentimental Bloke.

In 1958 Queen Elizabeth II appointed him a Lieutenant of the Royal Victorian Order. In 1983 he was awarded the Grand Cross of the Order of Pius IX, recognising his service as the inaugural Australian Ambassador to the Holy See (1973–74, 1980–83).

Diplomatic posts
Preceded by Colin Moodie	Australian Ambassador to the Netherlands; 1970–1974	Succeeded by Frederick Blakeney
New title Position established	Australian Ambassador to Denmark; 1970–1971	Succeeded by Gerald Harding as Chargé d'affaires
New title Position established	Australian Ambassador to the Holy See; 1973–1974	Succeeded by John McMillan
Preceded by Frederick Blakeney	Permanent Representative of Australia to the United Nations Office in Geneva; 1978–1981	Succeeded by David Sadleir
Preceded by Brian Hill	Australian Ambassador to the Holy See; 1980–1983	Succeeded by Peter Lawler
Preceded by Ruth Dobson	Australian Ambassador to Ireland; 1982–1983	Succeeded by Peter Lawler
