= Ruth Dobson =

Australian public servant, diplomat (1918–1989)

Ruth Dobson OBE
- Born: Ruth Violet Lissant Dobson; 5 October 1918; Neutral Bay, New South Wales, Australia
- Died: 14 December 1989 (aged 71); Canberra, Australian Capital Territory
- Education: University of Sydney (BA)
- Occupations: Public servant; diplomat

Ruth Violet Lissant Dobson OBE (5 October 1918 – 14 December 1989) was an Australian public servant and diplomat.

== Life and career ==
Ruth Dobson was born in Neutral Bay, NSW on 5 October 1918. Her younger sister was the poet Rosemary Dobson. Dobson was just seven years old when her father died.

Dobson joined the Commonwealth Public Service in 1943 as a research assistant in the Department of External Affairs, having unsuccessfully applied for a cadetship earlier that year.

In 1965, Dobson was seconded to Government House as private secretary to Lady Casey. Her 16 month secondment was followed by an appointment as First Secretary in the Australian Embassy in the Philippines.

In 1974, when appointed Australian Ambassador to Denmark, Dobson became the first Australian woman career diplomat to be appointed an ambassador. She was the second Australian woman to work in an ambassadorial role—Dame Annabelle Rankin had been appointed High Commissioner to New Zealand in 1971, but Rankin's was a political appointment.

In 1978, Dobson was appointed Australian Ambassador to Ireland. At the end of the posting, in 1981, Dobson retired.

Dobson died on 14 December 1989 in Canberra.

== Awards and honours ==
Dobson was made an Officer of the Order of the British Empire in 1982, in recognition of her services to the Australian Public Service.

In late 2016, the Department of Foreign Affairs and Trade named one of its 16 meeting rooms in honour of Dobson, in recognition of her work as a pioneering female diplomat.

Diplomatic posts
Preceded by Gerald Harding as Chargé d'affaires	Australian Ambassador to Denmark; 1974–1978	Succeeded by James Humphreys
Preceded by Brian Hill	Australian Ambassador to Ireland; 1978–1981	Succeeded by Lloyd Thomson
