= Ruth Pearce (diplomat) =

Australian diplomat ambassador

Ruth Pearce is an Australian career diplomat who held senior positions with the Department of Foreign Affairs in the Australian government. She served as the Australian Ambassador to Poland (2008- 2011), to the Philippines (2002-2005), to the Russian Federation (1999-2002) and as High Commissioner to the Solomon Islands (1992-1994).

While serving as Ambassador to the Philippines in 2003, she was trapped along with many other occupants in a residence hotel when it was stormed and taken over by rogue Philippine soldiers who staged a mutiny against the government due to several grievances. There were no indications that Pearce herself was specifically targeted by the mutineers. The stand-off was peacefully resolved after a few days and Pearce, along with other hotel occupants, were released unharmed.

Pearce graduated from the University of Melbourne with a Bachelor of Arts degree and a Bachelor of Laws degree with Honours.
