= Estońska Street, Warsaw =

Street in Warsaw, Poland

Estońska Street
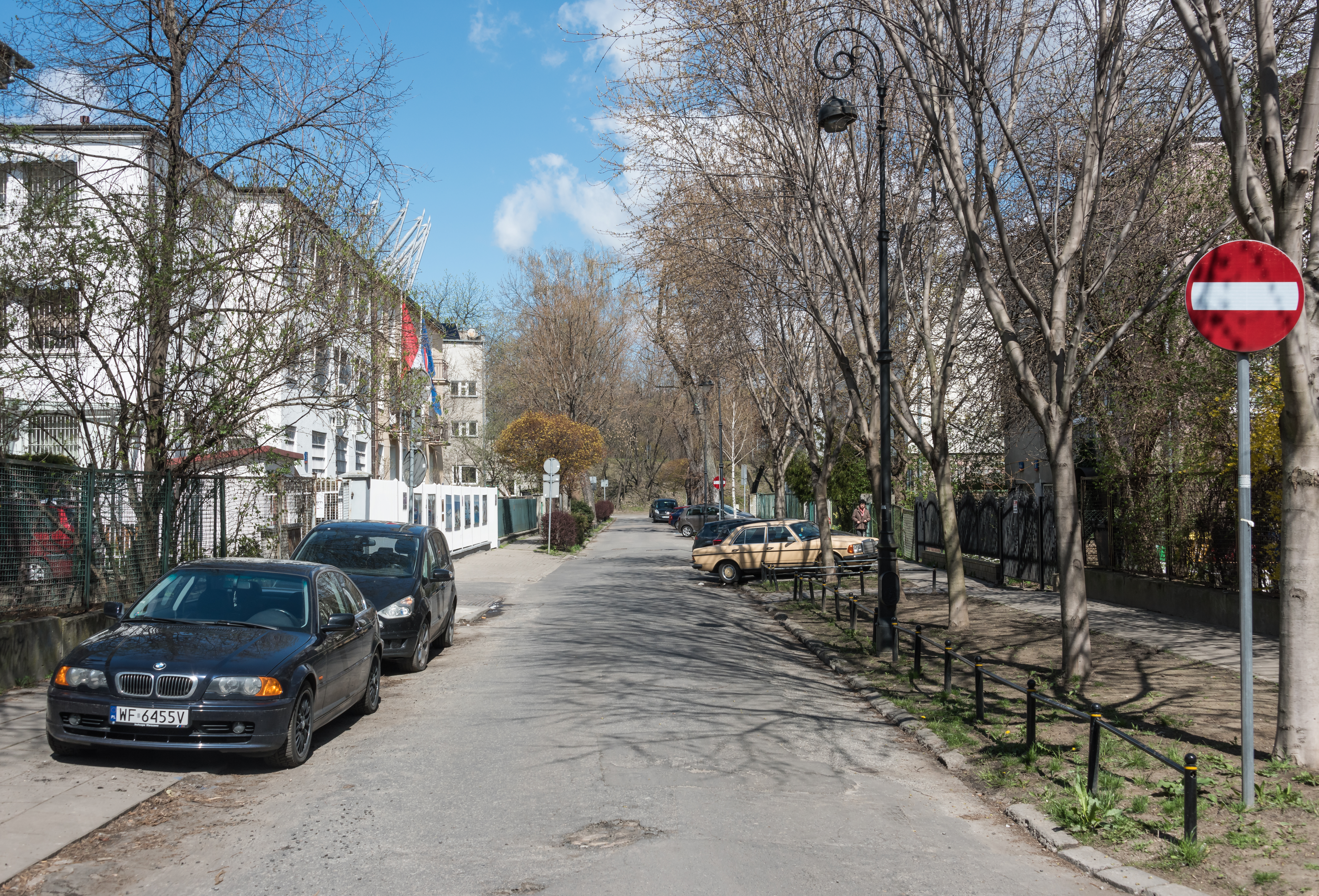
- Estońska Street, view from Berezyńska Street towards Jakubowska Street

- Location within Warsaw
- Part of: Saska Kępa
- Location: Warsaw
- Coordinates: 52°14′12.3″N 21°02′55.3″E

Estońska Street (Polish: Ulica Estońska; lit. Estonian Street) is a street in Saska Kępa, part of the Praga-Południe district in Warsaw, running from the intersection with Berezyńska Street to the intersection with Jakubowska Street. The street is lined with residential buildings, some dating back to the interwar period, one of which is listed as a historic monument. Its name is dedicated to Estonia, one of the countries formed after World War I, reflecting the naming pattern of several neighboring streets, particularly the parallel Finlandzka and Łotewska streets (named after Finland and Latvia).

== History ==
The name of the street was assigned by a resolution of the Warsaw City Council on 27 September 1926.

The oldest preserved houses on Estońska Street date back to the 1930s. They are remnants of the active work of architects promoting solutions in the spirit of modernism and functionalism. A notable example is the house of Jadwiga Dobrzyńska and Zygmunt Łoboda from 1932, which originally represented extreme functionalism.

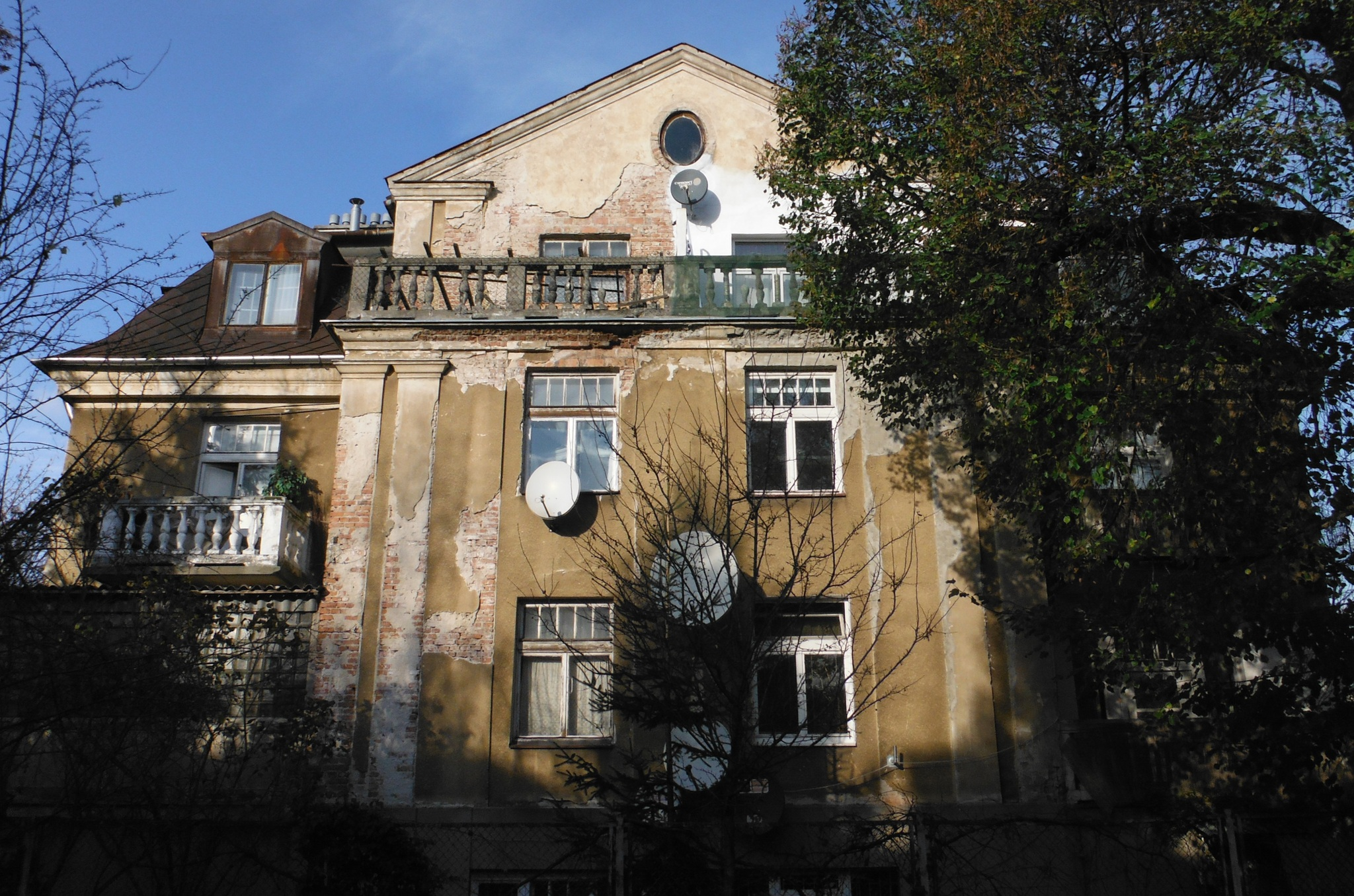
1 Estońska Street

== Important buildings ==
- 1 Estońska Street: a house from around 1930, listed as a historic monument.
- 3/5 Estońska Street: the Embassy of Indonesia, previously the Embassy of Australia (1990–2001).
- 6 Estońska Street: the personal house and studio of architects Jadwiga Dobrzyńska and Zygmunt Łoboda, built between 1932 and 1933. It is one of the few preserved works by this pair of architects in Warsaw. Originally, the design was clearly inspired by the five points of modern architecture proposed by Le Corbusier, but it lost much of its original character due to renovations. An illustration of this house appeared on the cover of the book SAS. Ilustrowany atlas architektury Saskiej Kępy (SAS. Illustrated Atlas of the Architecture of Saska Kępa), published in 2012, and also on the cover of issue 4 of the magazine Architektura i Budownictwo (Architecture and Construction) from 1934.
- 8 Estońska Street: a building designed by Helena and Szymon Syrkus for Aniela Landau, constructed between 1938 and 1939. The building features characteristics typical of late 1930s modernist architecture, such as a distinct contrast between smooth plaster and irregular stone. Notable elements include ribbon windows and a recessed ground floor.

== Gallery ==
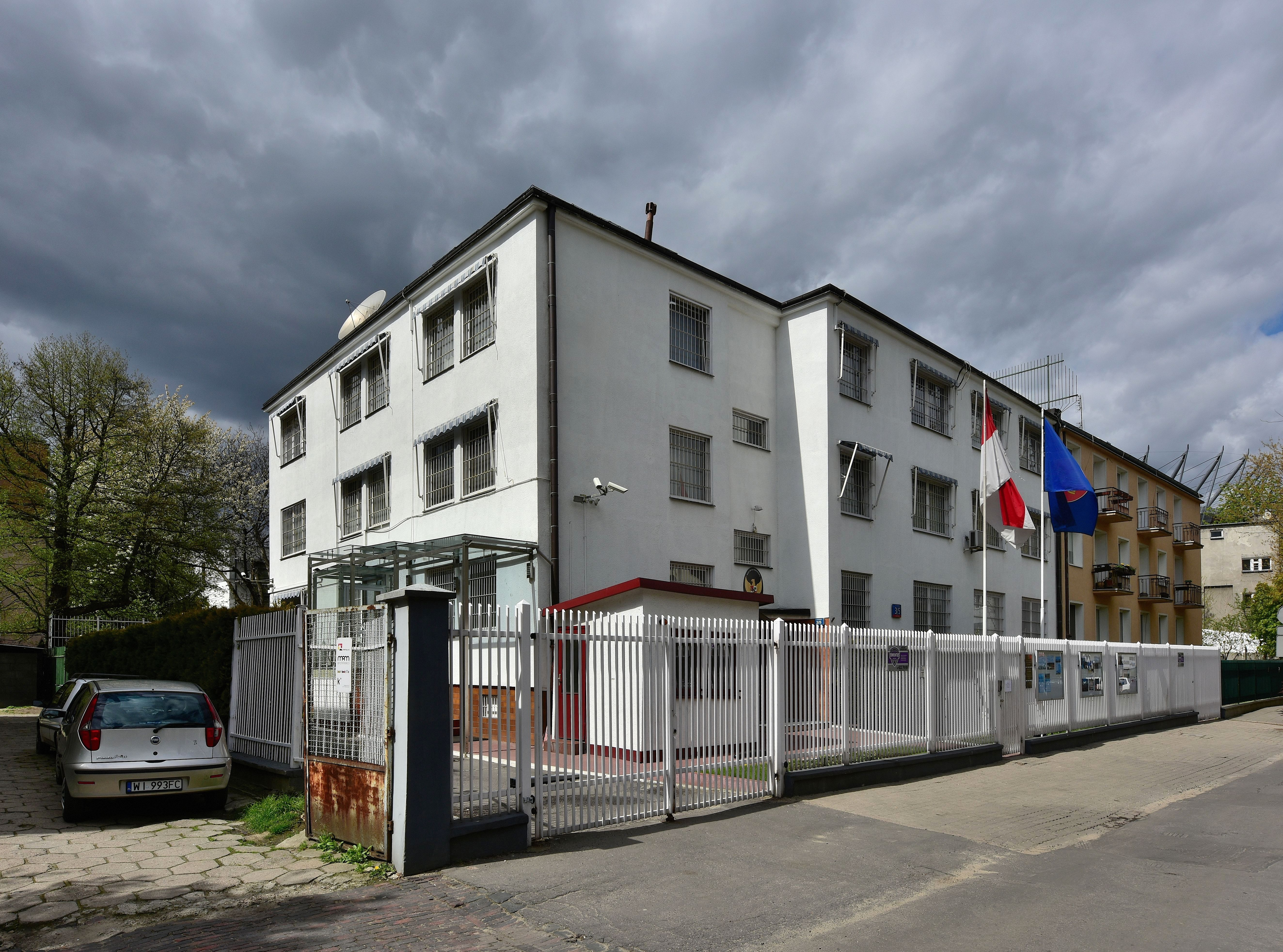
3/5 Estońska Street, Embassy of Indonesia

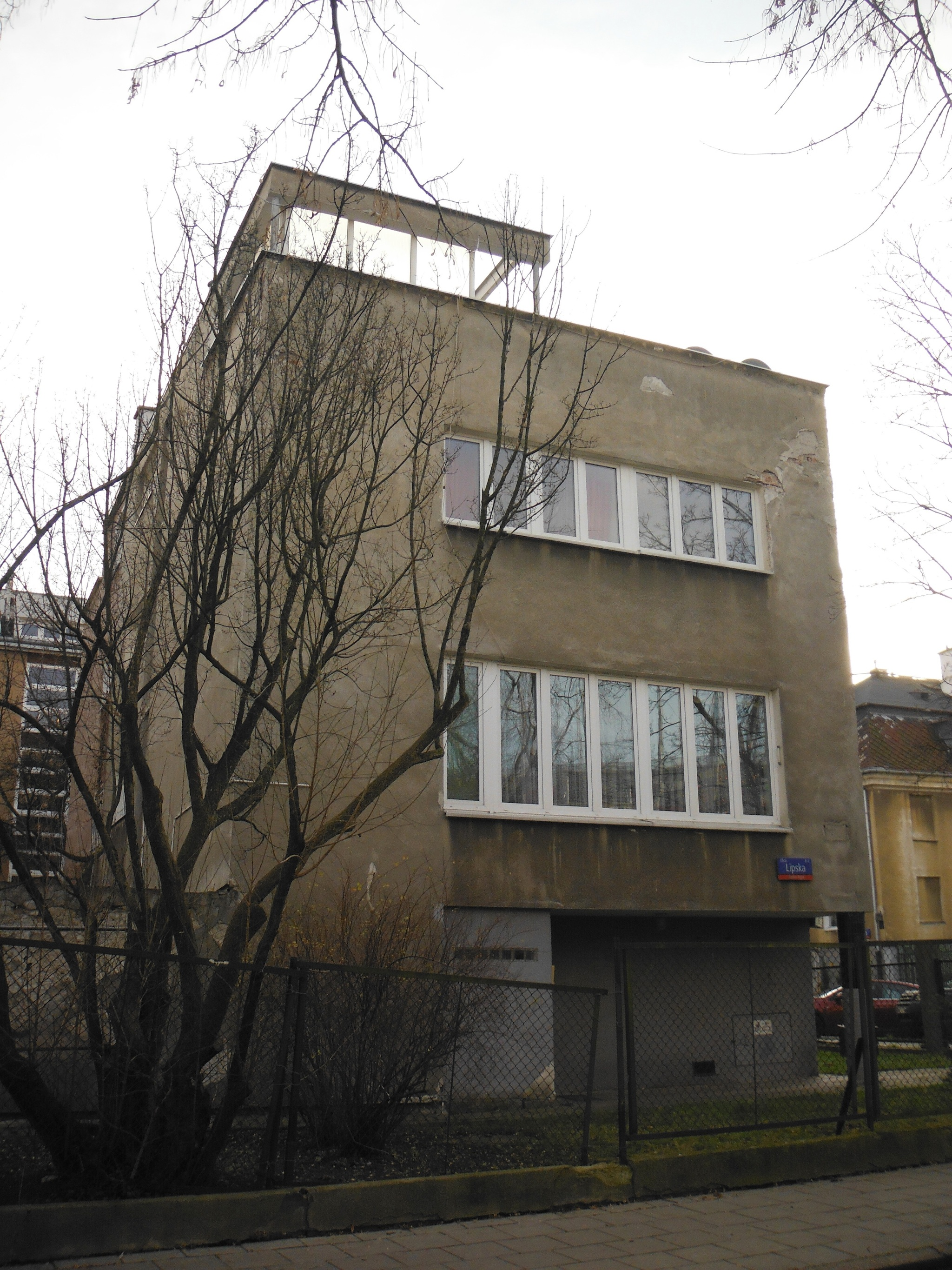
6 Estońska Street

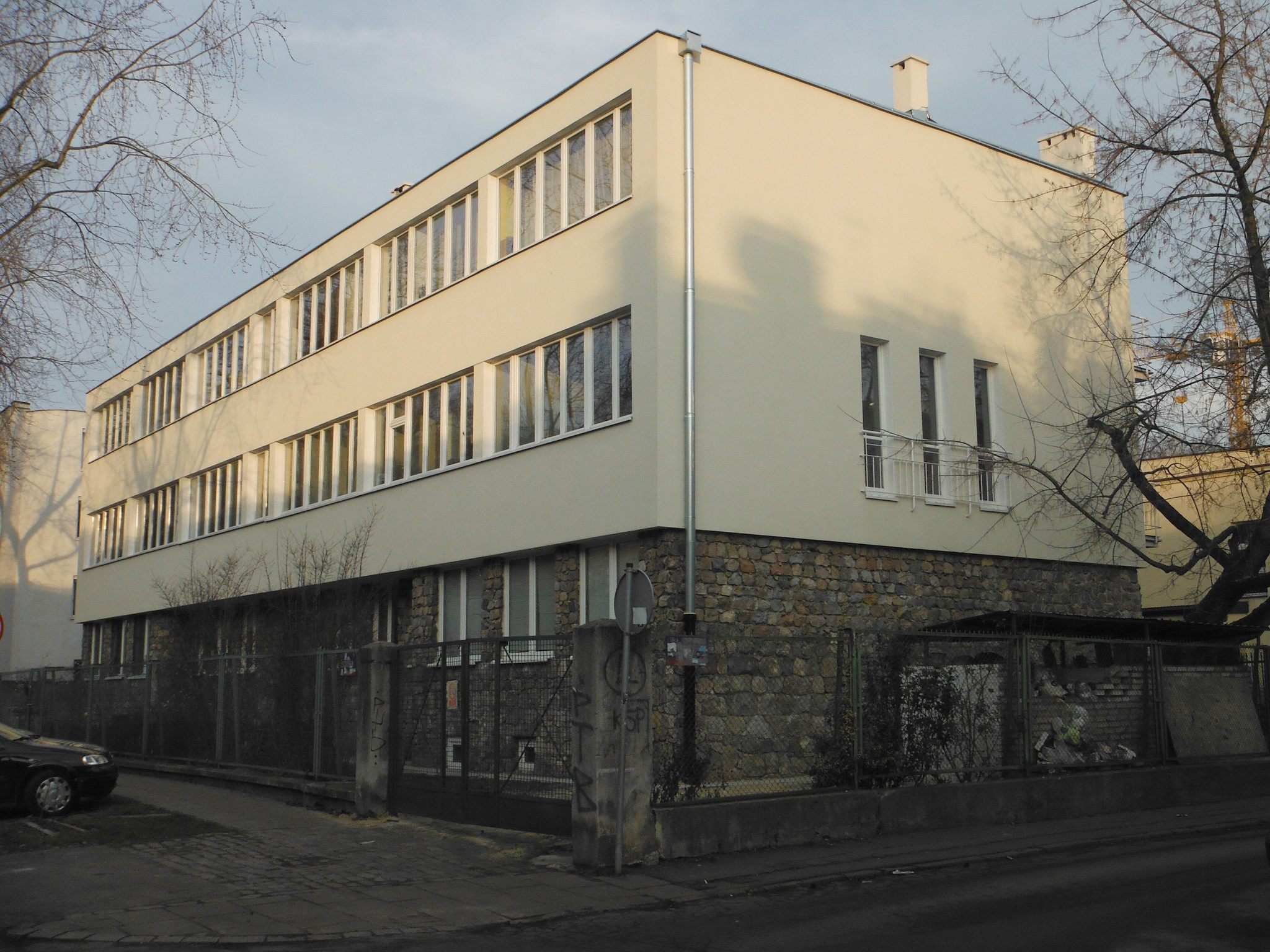
8 Estońska Street, Aniela Landau's building from between 1938 and 1938

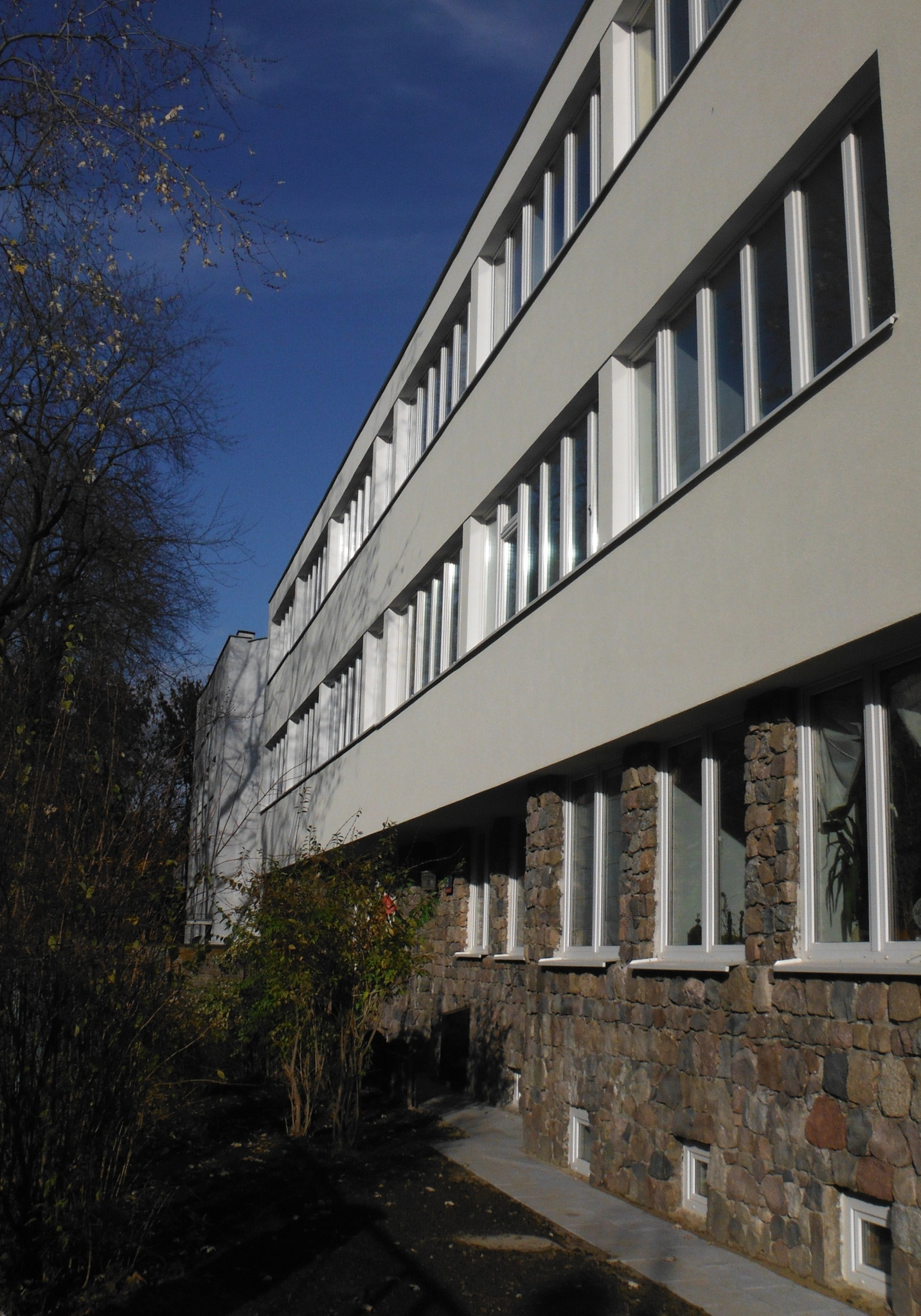
8 Estońska Street

== Bibliography ==
- Faryna-Paszkiewicz, Hanna (2001). Saska Kępa (in Polish). Warsaw: Murator. ISBN 83-915407-0-7.
- Piwowar, Magdalena; Piątek, Grzegorz; Trybuś, Jarosław (2012). SAS. Ilustrowany atlas architektury Saskiej Kępy [SAS. Illustrated Atlas of the Architecture of Saska Kępa] (in Polish). Centrum Architektury. ISBN 978-83-934574-0-3.
