= Human rights group =

Non-governmental organization which advocates for human rights

A human rights group, or human rights organization, is a non-governmental organization (NGO) which advocates for human rights through identification of their violation, collecting incident data, its analysis and publication, promotion of public awareness while conducting institutional advocacy, and lobbying to halt these violations. Like other NGOs, human rights groups are defined in their characteristics by legal, including taxation, constraints under which they operate, namely:

- They are "non-governmental", meaning that they are established by private initiative, are free from governmental influence, and do not perform public functions;
- They have an aim that is nonprofit, meaning that if any profits are earned by the organisation, they are not distributed to its members but used in the pursuit of its objective;
- They do not use or promote violence or have clear connections with criminality;
- They have a formal existence with a statute and a democratic and representative structure, and normally, but not necessarily, enjoy legal personality under national law.

What distinguishes a human rights group from other political elements of any given society is that while political advocates usually seeking to protect only the rights of their own constituents, a human rights group seeks to defend the same rights for all members of that or any other society. Unlike political groups which seek to advance their own discrete interests or programs a human rights group attempts to keep the political process open to all legitimate participants in the societal conflicts where such human rights violations occur. This generally independent focus distinguishes human rights groups from sectarian and partisan groups such as for example trades unions, whose primary goal is to protect the interests of the members of unions.

Human rights groups are sometimes confused with humanitarian organizations and groups representing lobbies focused on specific issue lobbies, while most seek to distinguishing themselves from political movements involved in the conflicts that are often causes of the human rights abuses. Often human rights groups claim expert knowledge on the issue or issues it surveys through human rights observers as field researchers. One of the best known international human rights groups is Amnesty International. However it, like many other groups, has stretched the definition of a human rights group because aside from not being a single-issue advocate it has also ventured into issues that are not clearly human rights.

There are some governmental organisations that are also deemed human rights groups, such as the Parliament of the United Kingdom's All-Party Parliamentary Group on Human Rights, but which are primarily reporting groups for the purpose of policy design.

== See also ==
- Human rights defender
- Human Rights Foundation
- List of human rights organisations
