= Embassy of Australia, Warsaw =

Diplomatic mission of Australia in Poland

Australian Embassy in Warsaw
- Coat of arms of Australia

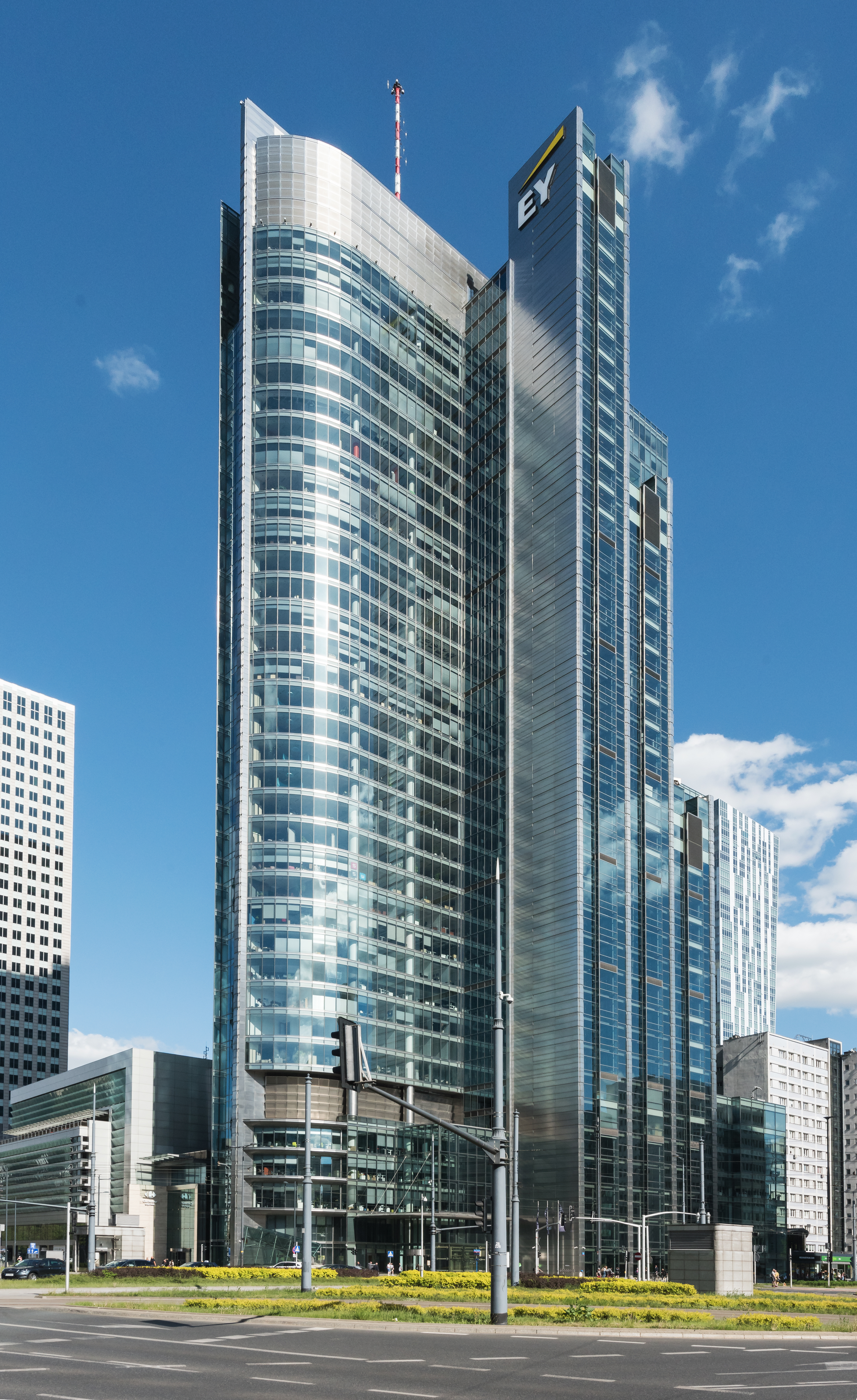
- The Rondo 1 building, which houses the embassy, in 2022.

Agency overview
- Formed: 1974
- Type: Diplomatic mission
- Jurisdiction: Poland; Czech Republic; Lithuania
- Headquarters: Warsaw, Poland; 52°13′57″N 20°59′59″E
- Employees: over 6
- Ambassador responsible: Benjamin Albert Hayes
- Website: poland.embassy.gov.au

The Australian Embassy in Warsaw, (Note: Polish: Ambasada Australii w Warszawie) also known as the Embassy of the Australian Commonwealth in Warsaw, (Note: Polish: Ambasada Związku Australijskiego w Warszawie) is the diplomatic mission of Australia in Poland. The embassy is located on Estońska Street in the city of Warsaw, Poland. The current ambassador of Australia to Poland is Benjamin Albert Hayes.

The ambassador of Australia to Poland also holds a non-resident accreditation to Czechia, and Lithuania.

== History ==
The relations between Australia and Poland were officially established in 1972. Until 1974, the Australian ambassador to Russia was also accredited to Poland, with the embassy being located in Moscow, Russia. In 1974, the embassy of Australia was opened in Poland.

== Departments ==
The embassy has a subdivision of the Department of Trade, which is a representative office of Austrade.

== See also ==
- Australia–Poland relations
- Foreign relations of Australia
- List of diplomatic missions of Australia
- List of ambassadors of Australia to Poland
