= Chen Yonglin =

Chinese diplomat

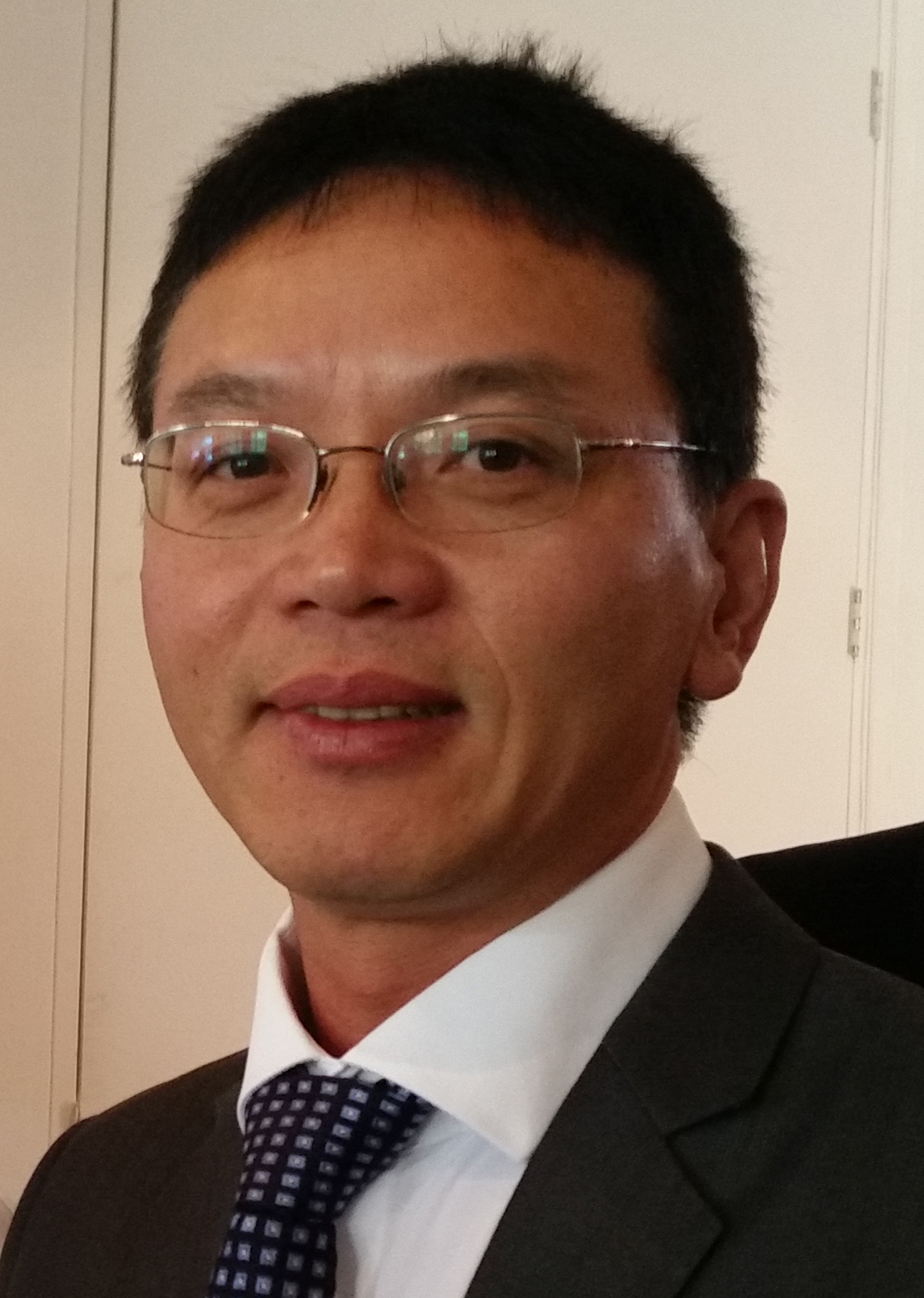
Chen Yonglin

Chen Yonglin (simplified Chinese: 陈用林; traditional Chinese: 陳用林) is a former Chinese diplomat who sparked fears of a diplomatic incident through his defection to Australia in the summer of 2005. The episode highlighted the tensions faced by China's trade partners when concerns arise from that nation's human rights record. The episode was compared to the Petrov Affair by such observers as Shadow Minister for Immigration Laurie Ferguson and trade unionist Bill Shorten.

== Background ==
Chen, who is from Ningbo, Zhejiang province, had been a university student in Beijing during the pro-democracy movement that ultimately led to the 1989 Tiananmen Square protests and massacre. Several of his friends were wounded in the ensuing repression by the government. He was said to have undergone political reeducation after the subsequent crackdown on dissidents, and joined the Chinese Ministry of Foreign Affairs in 1991. This culminated in his posting as the consul for political affairs in the Chinese consulate in Sydney, Australia. In this position, Chen has stated that he was responsible for monitoring Chinese political dissidents, especially Falun Gong, living in Australia. He also reportedly had access to highly classified information on Chinese intelligence activities in Australia. Chen has claimed that he had "gone easy" on dissidents and Falun Gong practitioners and had not reported some actions, to protest China's policies towards political dissent. He has also suggested that the Chinese government was becoming suspicious of his activities, and that as a result, he fears for his safety if returned to China. Chen remains unapologetic over his defection, insisting that he betrayed the Chinese Communist Party, not China.

Factors contributing to the defection, according to Chen, are the torture and death of his father during the Cultural Revolution, witnessing the Tiananmen Massacre and the persecution against the Falun Gong imposed by the Chinese authorities.

== Defection and allegations ==
On 26 May 2005, Chen walked out of the consulate with his wife and daughter. On that day he reportedly met an officer from the Department of Immigration who contacted the Chinese consulate to verify Chen's identity. A Senate inquiry later criticized the government for this action, citing Chen's stated concern that such contact would put his life in danger. On 31 May he met with a representative from the Department of Foreign Affairs and Trade. Chen has stated that he was told at this meeting that his request for political asylum had been rejected, but that he could apply for a protection visa. The story broke to the international media on 3 June, when Chen contacted The Australian newspaper, sparking fears of a serious diplomatic incident between the two nations. Anne Plunkett the director of protocol at the Department of Foreign Affairs and Trade met with Chen, who alleges that she repeatedly urged him not to defect.

On 4 June, though he allegedly feared being kidnapped, Chen came out of hiding to address a rally commemorating the 16th anniversary of the 1989 Tiananmen Square protests and massacre. During his speech, he claimed he would "reveal everything he knows". He also claimed that the Chinese government had more than a thousand agents in Australia, and that they were responsible for monitoring and kidnapping Chinese nationals back to China. Furthermore, Chen claimed that in one particular case in early 2000, Chinese agents in Sydney had kidnapped a student to force his father, Lan Fu, a former senior Chinese official to return to China.

After the June 4th rally, Chen once again went into hiding, having claimed that he was under constant surveillance and in fear of his life. On 5 June, the Chinese embassy released a statement claiming that Chen was due to return home and had invented allegations of wrongdoing in the hope that he would be allowed to stay. The statement was intended to alleviate fears for Chen's safety if he returned to China.

== Support, opposition, and ultimate success ==
On 7 June Chen's claims of a thousand-strong spy network were supported by Hao Fengjun, a former police officer with the 6-10 Office, a special security force established to eradicate Falun Gong by whatever means they deem necessary. The Chinese government responded by claiming that documents seized from Hao's home in China had shown that he was a low-level policeman suspected of corruption. Hao's lawyer, Bernard Collaery, attacked the claims, however, arguing that they were "standard [Chinese] tactics." Hao was granted a protection visa by the Australian government in late July 2005.

On 7 July, a Chinese defector in Canada using the name Han Guangsheng emerged to support Chen and Hao's spying allegations. During his interview on the ABC show Lateline, Han explained "I do know that the Communist Party of China sent people to collect intelligence information, including Chinese Embassy and Consulate staff. Some of the reporters coming from state Chinese media and visiting scholars are also given special spying tasks to carry out." The fifty-two-year-old defector has been denied political asylum and ruled ineligible to remain in Canada, because the federal Immigration and Refugee Board found him a "willing accomplice" in prior human rights abuses. This appears consistent with Han's claim that he was in charge of Shenyang's public security and labor camps before his defection.

China's ambassador in Canberra, Fu Ying, condemned Chen for "attacking his motherland" with "allegations and noise" for what she claimed was the sole purpose of living in a wealthier country. She warned that many more would follow Chen, if he was allowed to relocate to Australia.

On 8 July, Chen Yonglin, his wife, and his 6-year-old daughter were granted permanent protection visas by the Immigration Department, despite the opposition of the Chinese government.

== Post-visa statements and activities ==
Following the granting of protection visas to Chen and his family, he has met with Australian intelligence officials to discuss his earlier claims of a thousand-strong Chinese spy network. On 21 July Chen testified before the United States House of Representatives Subcommittee on Africa, Global Human Rights and International Operations as part of a panel discussing "Falun Gong and China's Continuing War on Human Rights." Here Chen broadened his earlier charges, stating: "I am aware there are over 1,000 Chinese secret agents and informants in Australia, and the number in the United States should not be less." He also testified that "The United States and Australia are considered by the CPC as the base of the Falun Gong overseas" and that "Chinese diplomats are required to denounce the Falun Gong and to distribute anti-Falun Gong materials whenever it is possible."

On 31 July, Chen attended a public seminar hosted by the Victorian Federation of Chinese Associations without invitation. There he defended and repeated his earlier spying allegations, and went on to claim that the VFCA was "controlled by the Chinese Consulate in Melbourne". The vice president of the federation, Sheng Wang, denied these claims and accused Chen of damaging the reputation of all Chinese Australians as well as undermining relations between China and Australia.

On 5 August, Chen was invited to a seminar at the University of Melbourne.

On 16 August, Chen accused the Chinese government of sending a three-member assassination squad into Australia, claiming he was alerted to their presence by a close friend in the foreign ministry. Chen told ABC TV, "they want to shut me up and ... they want to send a warning example to others who want to defect." Foreign Minister Alexander Downer called this "highly improbable."

In late September, Chen contended that the man in charge of China's spy network continued to operate out of the consulate-general in Sydney. As reported by The Bulletin, this individual works independently of the consulate, complete with his own budget. Chen did not name this alleged spymaster.

In October and November, Chen addressed the European Parliament, the Flemish Parliament of Belgium, and the British Parliament on the issue of humans rights in China. The Chinese Mission at the European Parliament sent three diplomats and three official media reporters to hear Chen's testimony at the European Parliament. While Chen was addressing to the British All-Party Parliamentary Group on Human Rights at the Palace of Westminster, President Hu Jintao was visiting Westminster. Prime Minister Tony Blair was forced to raise the human rights issue with Hu under the pressure of overwhelming media attention.

On 30 March 2006, Chen joined more than 4000 signatories in an open letter to Australian Prime Minister John Howard to question Premier Wen Jiabao regarding the persecution against human rights lawyers in China by the Chinese authorities and concern about allegations of live organ harvesting at the Shenyang Thrombosis Hospital despite official Chinese denials.
