= Margaret Twomey =

Australian diplomat

Margaret Twomey AM
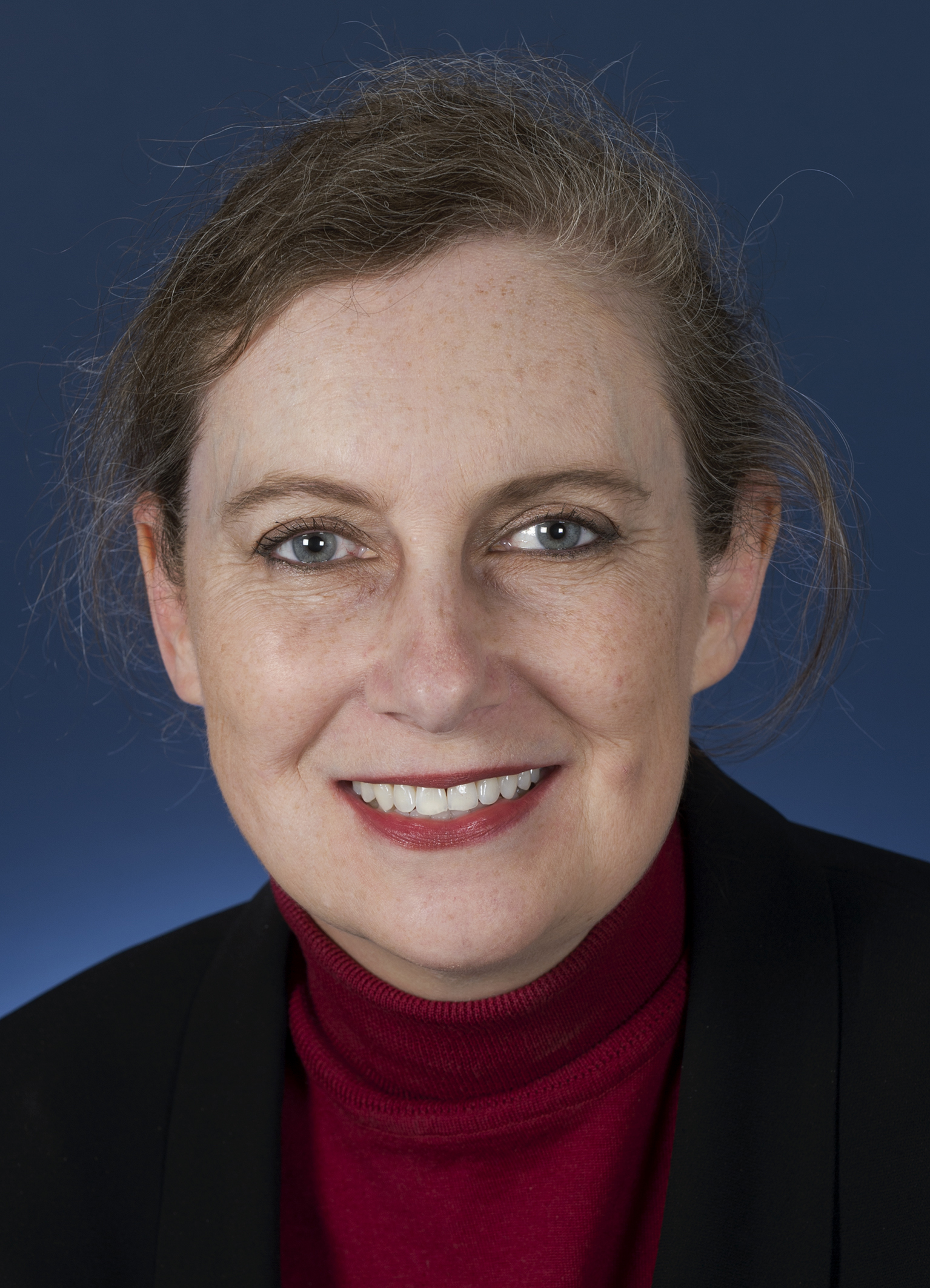
- Margaret Twomey in 2014

Australian Ambassador to Italy
- In office July 2020 – October 2024
- Preceded by: Greg French

Personal details
- Born: 21 February 1963 (age 63) Shepparton, Victoria, Australia
- Relatives: Patrick Twomey (grandfather) Anne Twomey (sister)
- Education: University of Melbourne (BA)

Margaret Eileen Twomey AM (born 21 February 1963) is Ambassador of Australia to Italy (since July 2020). She is former High Commissioner of Australia to Fiji, from November 2014 to November 2017. Twomey has an honours degree in arts (Russian and French) from the University of Melbourne. Her grandfather Patrick Twomey started the PJ Twomey Hospital for Lepers in Fiji.

== Former appointments ==
- High Commissioner to Fiji (2014–2017)
- Head of Policy Planning, DFAT (2013–2014)
- Ambassador to Russia and Kazakhstan, Kyrgyzstan, Turkmenistan, Uzbekistan, Tajikistan, Armenia, Moldova, Belarus (2008–2012), and Ukraine (2008–2009).
- Australia's Ambassador to East Timor (2004–08)
- Deputy High Commissioner in Suva (2000–02)
- First Secretary and Counsellor in London (1995–2000)
- Third, later Second Secretary in Belgrade (1990–92)

Diplomatic posts
Preceded by Paul Foley	Australian Ambassador to East Timor; 2004–2008	Succeeded by Peter Heyward
Preceded by Bob Tyson	Australian Ambassador to Russia; Australian Ambassador to Kazakhstan; 2008–2011	Succeeded by Paul Myler
Preceded by Bob Tyson	Australian Ambassador to Ukraine (resident in Moscow); 2008–2009	Succeeded by Michael Potts (resident in Vienna)
Preceded by James Batley	Australian High Commissioner to Fiji; 2014–2017	Succeeded by John Feakes
Preceded by Greg French	Australian Ambassador to Italy; 2020–	Incumbent
