= List of ambassadors of Australia to Timor-Leste =

Ambassador of Australia to Timor-Leste

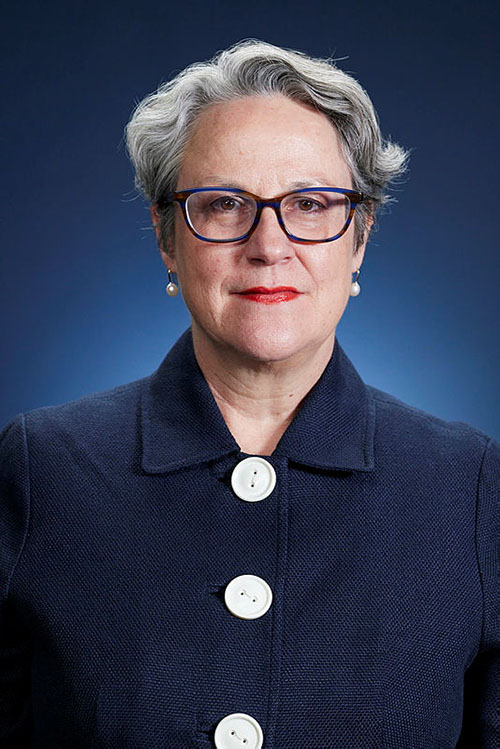
- Incumbent; Caitlin Wilson since 20 January 2024
- Department of Foreign Affairs and Trade
- Style: His Excellency
- Reports to: Minister for Foreign Affairs
- Residence: Dili
- Nominator: Prime Minister of Australia
- Appointer: Governor-General of Australia
- Inaugural holder: James Batley
- Formation: 8 June 1999 (Consulate); 30 May 2002 (Embassy)
- Website: Australian Embassy in Timor-Leste

The ambassador of Australia to Timor-Leste is an officer of the Australian Department of Foreign Affairs and Trade and the head of the Embassy of the Commonwealth of Australia to Timor-Leste. The position has the rank and status of an ambassador extraordinary and plenipotentiary and the embassy in Dili has been operating since 1999 when a consulate was established in the Indonesian Province of Timor Timur and upgraded in May 2002.

== Posting history ==
=== Representation in Portuguese Timor ===
The Australian diplomatic presence in East Timor dates back to 13 April 1941, when Group Captain David Ross, was officially appointed as a Technical Representative of the Australian Department of Civil Aviation in Dili, the capital of Portuguese Timor, officially tasked with managing the Qantas Empire Airways Flying boat route to Dili, which had been established in January 1941. Ross had also been secretly tasked by the Australian Government from 5 November 1941 to act as Australia's representative in the colony to report on any matters relating to the political situation there. At the instigation of Herbert Evatt, Minister for External Affairs, Ross was also serving as the British Consul in Dili and was later arrested when Japanese forces invaded the colony in February 1942. The establishment of a consulate with Ross as its head had been mooted prior to the Japanese invasion.

With the end of the war and the return of Portuguese authority to Timor, the Australian Government established a consulate in Dili, commencing operations on 1 January 1946 with the appointment of Charles Eaton as consul. Australia had been approached by the Portuguese Government of António de Oliveira Salazar to accept the establishment of an embassy in Canberra, but this was not approved, with Australia citing that it was unable to reciprocate owing to a lack of resources, instead suggesting an Australian consulate in Dili, which was agreed to. Prior to the establishment of an Australian Embassy in Portugal in 1970, the consulate dealt with various matters relating to Australia's relations with Portugal. Following the establishment of the embassy in Lisbon, the consulate became much less important and on 3 May 1971, the Acting Minister for Foreign Affairs, Reginald Swartz, announced the consulate's closure, which took effect on 31 August 1971.

In August 1975, the Foreign Affairs Caucus Committee of the Australian Labor Party visited Timor and produced a report noting that Governor Mário Lemos Pires had made several requests for the consulate to be reopened: "We asked for a consul in November [1974] and have asked about ten times since. Mr Taylor of the Australian Embassy [in Jakarta] was asked last week. [Australian Ambassador] Mr Woolcott was asked this week. We have asked Lisbon and I believe Dr Matias, Portuguese Ambassador in Canberra, has, or will be, asking again in Australia." Governor Pires also noted to the committee that these requests were made in order to make Australia more able to engage with the increasingly unstable situation in the colony prior to the Indonesian invasion of East Timor: "At present Australia cannot compensate for Indonesian propaganda or understand the day-to-day happenings in the colony."

=== Indonesian Timor and independence ===
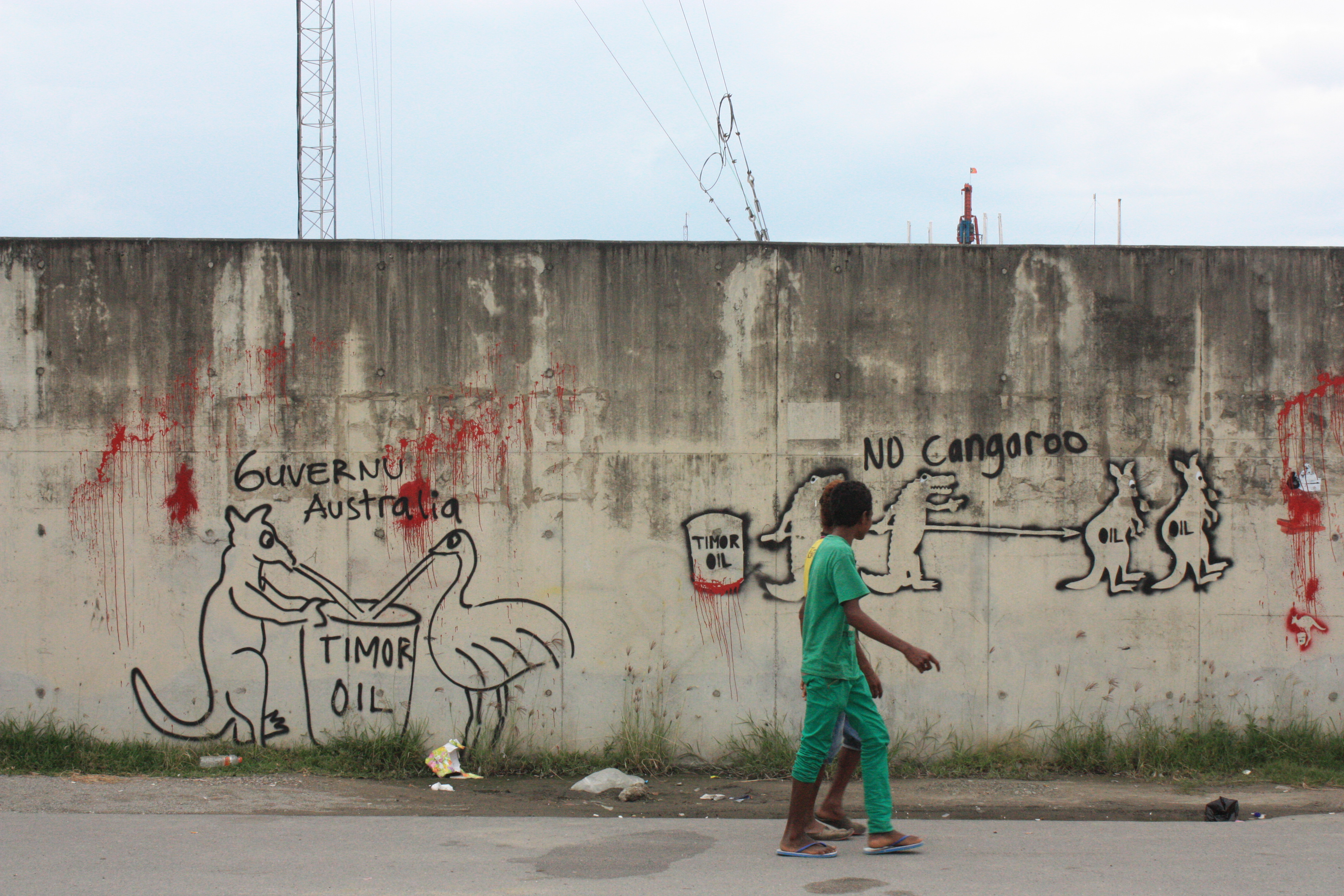
Graffiti on the outside wall of the Australian Embassy in Dili

In early April 1999, Prime Minister John Howard and Indonesian President B. J. Habibie met in Bali to discuss matters relating to the unrest in the Province of Timor, which had Indonesian-occupied since Timor's brief independence from Portugal in 1975. Howard initially requested Habibie to agree to a peacekeeping force in the province, which was refused, but Habibie agreed to allowing the establishment of an Australian Consulate in Dili. On 4 June 1999 Foreign Minister Alexander Downer announced the appointment of James Batley as consul in Dili, noting that the consulate "will allow us to service the consular needs of the increasing number of Australians in East Timor, and will facilitate Australia's considerable support to the United Nations Assistance Mission in East Timor." However, with the establishment of the United Nations Transitional Administration in East Timor (UNTAET) on 25 October 1999, Batley's role was changed to be Australia's Head of Mission to the UNTAET and following independence was appointed as Australia's first ambassador on 20 May 2002, the first foreign diplomatic appointment to the new Republic of Timor-Leste.

== Lists of officeholders ==
=== Consuls in Portuguese Timor ===
#	Name	Term start date	Term end date	Time in office	Notes
1	Charles Eaton	1 January 1946	18 October 1947	1 year, 290 days	
2	Doug White	18 October 1947	24 June 1950	2 years, 249 days	
3	N. Elliot (Vice Consul)	7 January 1951	26 February 1952	1 year, 50 days	
4	Francis Whittaker	4 November 1953	27 November 1959	6 years, 23 days	
5	W. A. Luscombe	27 November 1959	24 January 1962	2 years, 58 days	
6	James Dunn	24 January 1962	12 August 1964	2 years, 201 days	
–	D. W. Milton (Acting)	12 August 1964	16 December 1965	1 year, 126 days	
7	John Colquhoun-Denvers	16 December 1965	27 November 1968	2 years, 347 days	
8	Max Berman	27 November 1968	20 January 1970	1 year, 54 days	
9	G. W. Shannon	20 January 1970	14 January 1971	359 days	
10	D. W. Milton	14 January 1971	31 August 1971	229 days	
Closure of consulate

=== Heads of mission ===
#	Name	Office	Term start	Term end	Time in office	Notes
1	James Batley	Consul/Head of Mission	8 June 1999	20 May 2002	2 years, 356 days	
1	James Batley	Ambassador	20 May 2002	30 May 2002	2 years, 356 days	
2	Paul Foley	Ambassador	30 May 2002	7 April 2004	1 year, 313 days	
3	Margaret Twomey	Ambassador	7 April 2004	2008	3–4 years	
4	Peter Heyward	Ambassador	2008	2011	2–3 years	
5	Miles Armitage	Ambassador	2011	2014	2–3 years	
6	Peter Doyle	Ambassador	12 February 2014	4 January 2018	3 years, 326 days	
7	Peter Roberts OAM	Ambassador	4 January 2018	incumbent	8 years, 316 days	
7	Bill Costello	Ambassador	April 2021	incumbent		
7	Bryce Hutchesson, Charge d’affaires	Ambassador	September 2022			
7	John Feakes, charge D’affaires	Ambassador	December 2022	incumbent		
7	Caitlin Wilson, Charge d’affaires	Ambassador	April 2023	incumbent		
