= List of ambassadors of Australia to Portugal =

Ambassador of Australia to Portugal

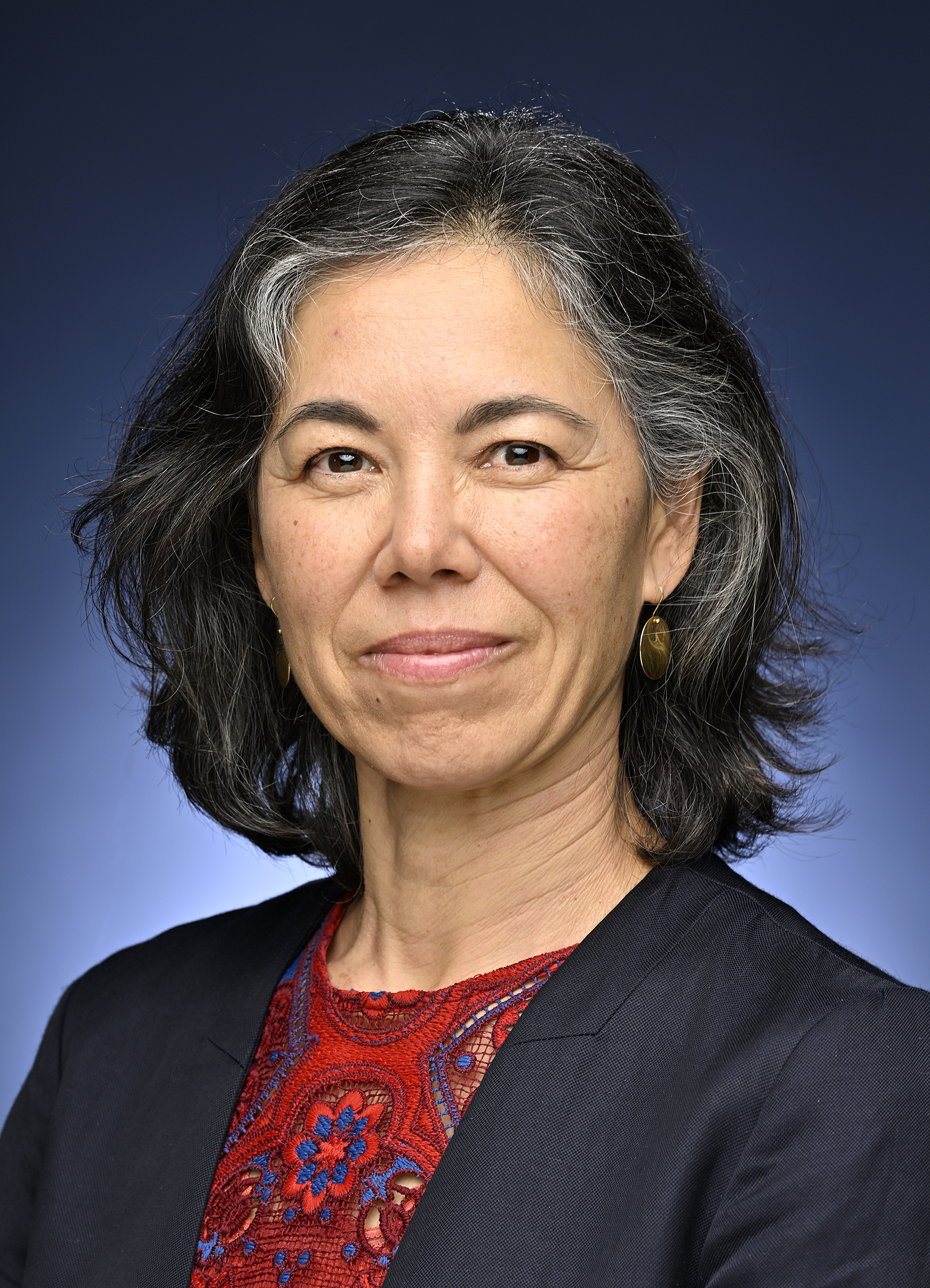
- Incumbent; Indra McCormick since 30 September 2022
- Department of Foreign Affairs and Trade
- Style: His/Her Excellency
- Reports to: Minister for Foreign Affairs
- Residence: Lisbon
- Seat: Edifício Victoria, Avenida da Liberdade, Lisbon
- Nominator: Prime Minister of Australia
- Appointer: Governor General of Australia
- Inaugural holder: Alan Renouf (resident in Paris)
- Formation: 28 July 1969
- Website: Australian Embassy, Portugal

The Ambassador of Australia to Portugal is an officer of the Australian Department of Foreign Affairs and Trade and the head of the Embassy of the Commonwealth of Australia to the Portuguese Republic. The ambassador resides in Lisbon. The ambassador also holds non-resident accreditation for Cabo Verde (since 2009), São Tomé and Príncipe (since 2009) and Guinea-Bissau (since March 2011).

From 1946 to 1970, Australia's relations with Portugal were handled by the Consulate in Portuguese Timor.

The current ambassador, since September 2022, is Indra McCormick.

== List of heads of mission ==
Ordinal	Officeholder	Title	Other offices	Residency	Term start date	Term end date	Time in office	Notes
1	Alan Renouf OBE	Ambassador of Australia to Portugal		Paris, France	28 July 1969	8 March 1970	223 days	
(n/a)	Thomas Holland	Chargé d'affaires		Lisbon, Portugal	8 March 1970	December 1970	8 months	
2	Kevin Kelly	Ambassador of Australia to Portugal		Lisbon, Portugal	December 1970	1974	3–4 years	
3	Frank Cooper	Ambassador of Australia to Portugal		Lisbon, Portugal	1974	1977	2–3 years	
4	Leslie Sellars	Ambassador of Australia to Portugal		Lisbon, Portugal	1977	1981	3–4 years	
5	Geoffrey Brady	Ambassador of Australia to Portugal		Lisbon, Portugal	1981	1984	2–3 years	
6	Bruce Woodberry	Ambassador of Australia to Portugal		Lisbon, Portugal	1984	1988	3–4 years	
(n/a)	Annabel Anderson	Chargé d'affaires		Lisbon, Portugal	1988	1989	0–1 years	
7	Stuart Hume	Ambassador of Australia to Portugal		Lisbon, Portugal	1989	January 1993	3–4 years	
8	Clive Jones	Ambassador of Australia to Portugal		Paris, France	January 1993	August 1993	7 months	
9	Alan Brown	Ambassador of Australia to Portugal		Paris, France	August 1993	19 July 1996	2 years, 11 months	
10	John Spender QC	Ambassador of Australia to Portugal		Paris, France	19 July 1996	November 2000	4 years, 3 months	
11	Janet Gardiner	Ambassador of Australia to Portugal		Lisbon, Portugal	November 2000	2003	2–3 years	
12	Greg Polson	Ambassador of Australia to Portugal		Lisbon, Portugal	2003	2006	2–3 years	
13	Luke Williams	Ambassador of Australia to Portugal		Lisbon, Portugal	2006	2009	2–3 years	
14	Patrick Lawless	Ambassador of Australia to Portugal	^{A}^{B}^{C}	Lisbon, Portugal	2009	2012	2–3 years	
15	Anne Plunkett	Ambassador of Australia to Portugal	^{A}^{B}^{C}	Lisbon, Portugal	2012	19 April 2016	3–4 years	
16	Peter Rayner	Ambassador of Australia to Portugal	^{A}^{B}^{C}	Lisbon, Portugal	19 April 2016	28 June 2019	3 years, 70 days	
17	Claire Rochecouste	Ambassador of Australia to Portugal	^{A}^{B}^{C}	Lisbon, Portugal	28 June 2019	30 September 2022	3 years, 94 days	
18	Indra McCormick	Ambassador of Australia to Portugal	^{A}^{B}^{C}	Lisbon, Portugal	30 September 2022	incumbent	3 years, 342 days	

=== Notes ===
^A: Also served as non-resident Ambassador of Australia to the Republic of Cabo Verde, since 2009.
^B: Also served as non-resident Ambassador of Australia to the Democratic Republic of São Tomé and Príncipe, since 2009.
^C: Also served as non-resident Ambassador of Australia to the Republic of Guinea-Bissau, since March 2011.
