= Han Guangsheng =

Chinese defector

Han Guangsheng (韩广生; born 1952), emerged as a Chinese defector in Canada during July 2005 to support a number of allegations made by Chen Yonglin. Han claims to have been in charge of Shenyang's public security and labor camps prior to his defection.
