= Patrick Lawless =

Australian diplomat

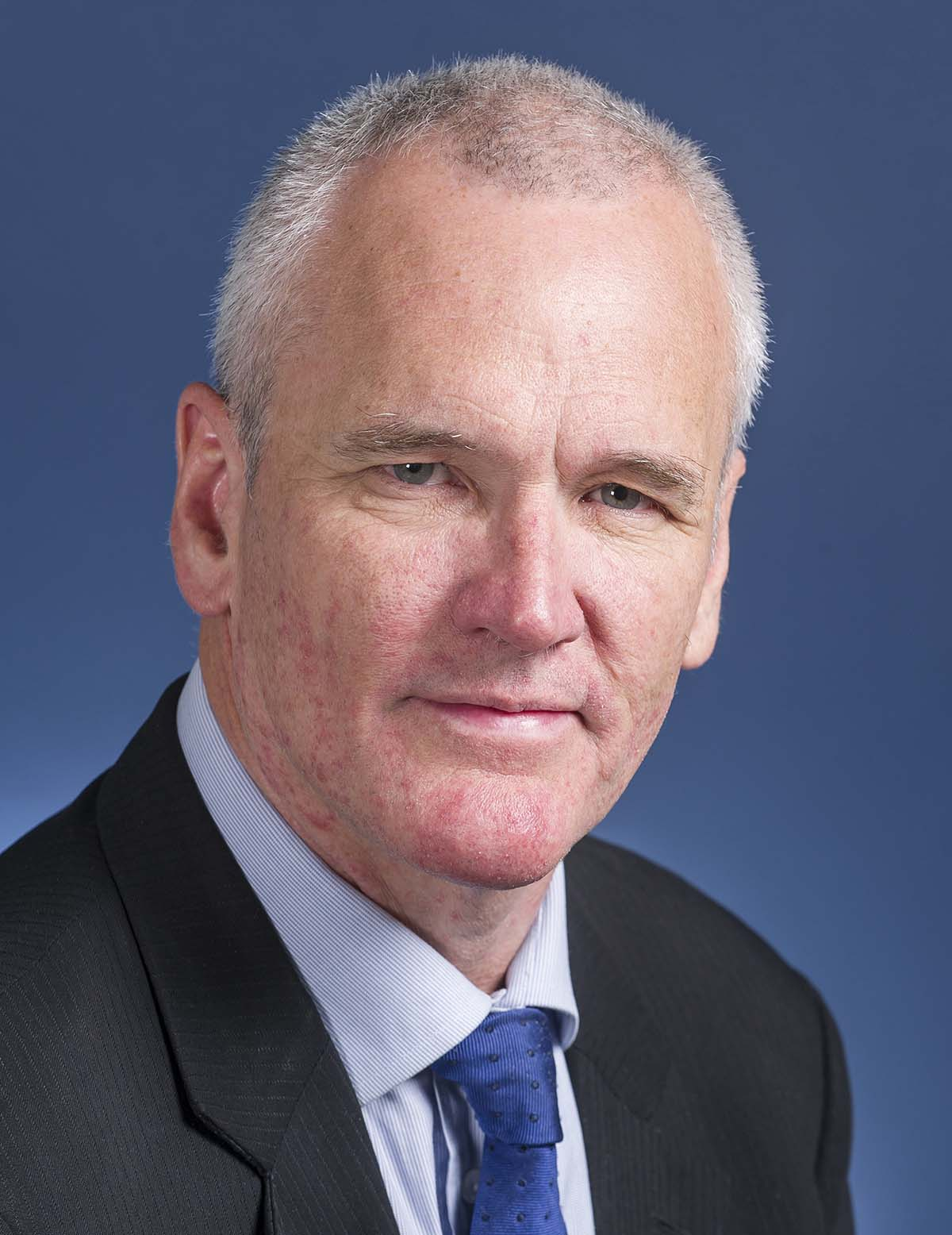

Australian Ambassador to Brazil
- In office 12 February 2014 – February 2016
- Preceded by: Brett Hackett
- Succeeded by: John Richardson

Australian Ambassador to Portugal
- In office 2009–2013

Australian Ambassador to Poland
- In office 2002–2005
- Preceded by: Margaret Adamson
- Succeeded by: Ian Forsyth

Personal details
- Education: University of New South Wales; London School of Economics
- Occupation: Senior career officer with Department of Foreign Affairs and Trade
- Profession: Diplomat

Patrick Colin Lawless is an Australian diplomat and senior career officer with the Department of Foreign Affairs and Trade (DFAT).

Lawless served as the Australian Ambassador to Brazil, from 12 February 2014 until February 2016. Lawless previously served as Australia's Ambassador to Portugal (2009–2013) and to Poland (2002–2005).

== Early life and education ==
Lawless can trace his family heritage to the First Fleet landing in Botany Bay in 1788.

Lawless speaks Portuguese and graduated from the University of New South Wales and London School of Economics. Prior to working for the Department of Foreign Affairs and Trade, Lawless practiced law in Sydney and worked for the Aboriginal Land Commissioner in Darwin.

== Career ==
Lawless began his career with the Department of Foreign Affairs in 1985 as held a number of positions with the Department throughout his career including three ambassadorships. Lawless worked as the speechwriter for the Foreign Minister and Trade Minister from 1992 and 1993 and then as an adviser in the Trade Minister's office in 1993. By 1998 Lawless began serving in senior Department positions beginning with the Director of the Staffing Operations Section in DFAT's Staffing Branch. His first ambassadorial appointment to Poland was announced by the Minister Alexander Downer on 30 May 2002 replacing Margaret Adamson. Lawless's replacement Ian Forsyth was announced in April 2005 and he completed his post in Poland in June 2005. Prior to his appointment as Ambassador to Poland he served as the head of the Trade Development Branch and Trade and Economic Analysis Branch, the Deputy Head of Mission in South Africa and Russia and a diplomatic posting in France

Lawless was announced as the Ambassador to Portugal with non-resident accreditation to Cape Verde, Guinea Bissau and Sao Tome and Principe on 24 August 2009 by Minister Stephen Smith, he replaced Luke Williams. He was replaced by Anne Plunkett in May 2012. After 2012 Lawless served as the head of DFAT's Resources, Competitiveness and Trade Analysis Branch.

Lawless was appointed the Ambassador to Brazil on 12 February 2014 by Minister Julie Bishop replacing Brett Hackett. While Ambassador to Brazil, Lawless, along with Austrade, was involved in organising and facilitating Australian involvement in the Brazilian Association of Water Resources Symposium which allowed for water management experts from Australia to train Brazilian stakeholders. He also met the Socceroos when they landed in Curitiba prior to their third World Cup game.

In January 2016, Foreign Minister Julie Bishop announced that Lawless would be replaced by John Richardson in February.

Diplomatic posts
Preceded by Brett Hackett	Australian Ambassador to Brazil; 2014–2016	Succeeded by John Richardson
Preceded by Luke Williams	Australian Ambassador to Portugal; 2009–2012	Succeeded by Anne Plunkett
Preceded by Margaret Adamson	Australian Ambassador to Poland; 2002–2005	Succeeded by Ian Forsyth
