= James Dunn (diplomat) =

Australian public servant and diplomat (1928–2020)

James Dunn AM
- Born: 6 January 1928; Bundaberg, Queensland, Australia
- Died: 31 January 2020 (aged 92); Canberra, Australian Capital Territory, Australia
- Occupations: Public servant, diplomat

James Stanley Dunn AM (6 January 1928 – 31 January 2020) was an Australian public servant and diplomat. He was Australia's consul in Portuguese Timor from 1962 to 1964.

In 1977 Dunn's report on war crimes and crimes against humanity committed by Indonesian troops in East Timor was released, prompting international attention. As a result, Dunn gave testimony about the issue to the Committee on International Relations of the United States House of Representatives on 23 March 1977. He alleged that American weapons had been used in the Indonesian invasion of East Timor in 1975. He also argued that Australia's policy related to East Timor was inadequate.

His book Timor: A People Betrayed (published 1983) was a tribute to the tragedy of the Timorese. The book was launched by Gordon McIntosh at the Lakeside Hotel in Canberra. In a review published in Woroni, Dunn was praised for his sincere tone. J.A.C. Mackie, writing for The Canberra Times wrote that the book was "disappointingly unconvincing".

In the 2001 Queen's Birthday Honours, Dunn was made a Member of the Order of Australia for "service to humanity as an advocate for the rights of the East Timorese." In 2002 he was awarded the rank of Grand Officer of the Order of Prince Henry (GOIH) by the President of Portugal. On 30 August 2009, Dunn was presented with the award of the Medal of the Order of Timor-Leste by the President, José Ramos-Horta.

He died on 31 January 2020; Prime Minister and former President of East Timor, Taur Matan Ruak, praised him as "one of the greatest international advocates for Timor Leste's self-determination".

== Works ==
- Timor: A People Betrayed, Jacaranda Press, 1983
- East Timor: A Rough Passage to Independence, Longueville Books, 2003, ISBN 1920681035

Diplomatic posts
Preceded by W.A. Luscombe	Australian Consul to Portuguese Timor; 1962–1964	Succeeded by D.W. Milton as Acting Consul
