= Embassy of Indonesia, Warsaw =

Diplomatic mission in Warsaw

Embassy of Indonesia, Warsaw Kedutaan Besar Republik Indonesia di Warsawa Ambasada Indonezji w Warszawie

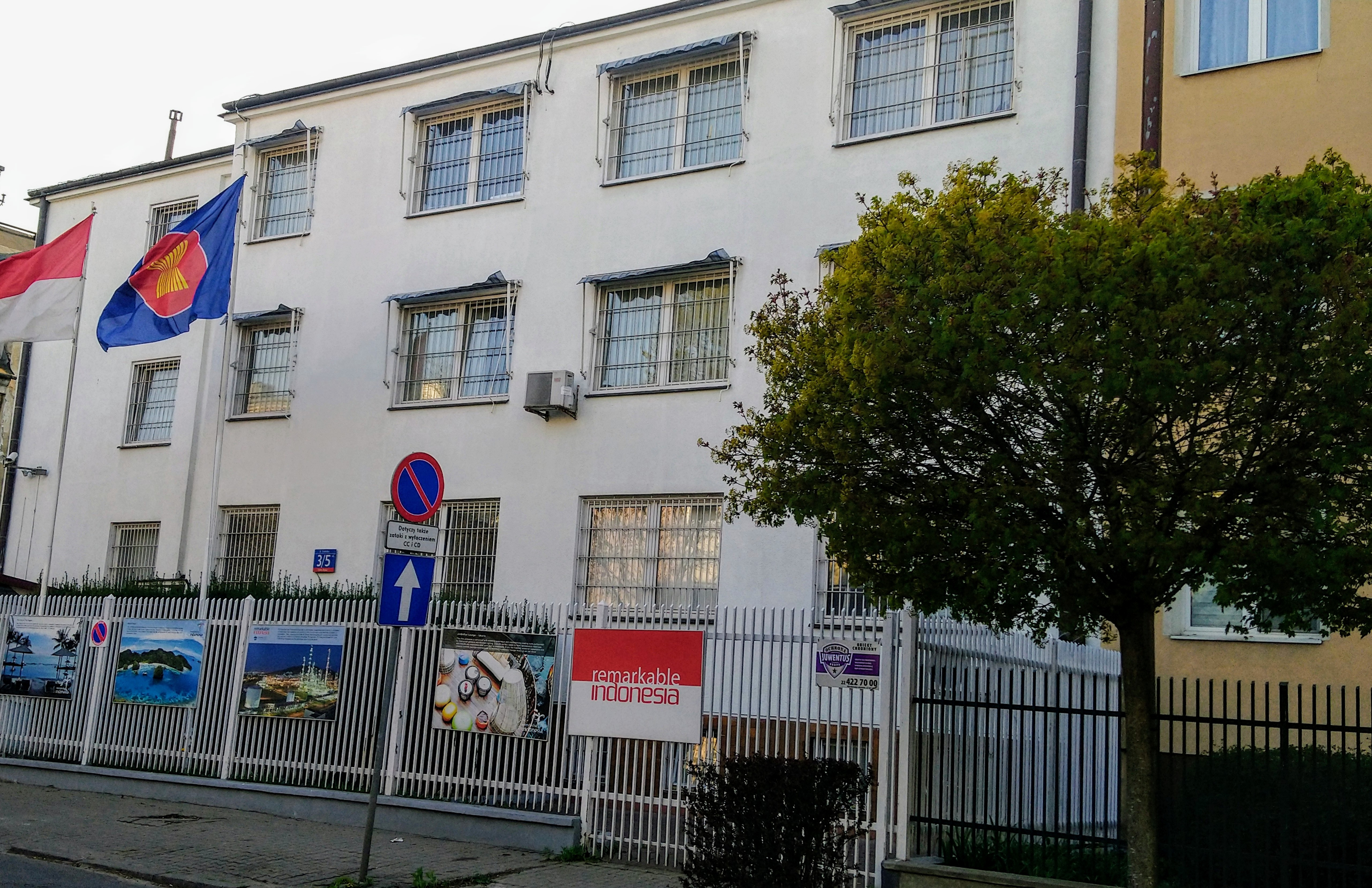
- Location: Warsaw, Poland
- Address: Estońska 3/5 03-903 Warszawa, Poland
- Coordinates: 52°14′10.88″N 21°02′54.74″E
- Ambassador: Anita Lidya Luhulima
- Website: kemlu.go.id/warsaw/en

The Embassy of Indonesia, Warsaw (Polish: Ambasada Indonezji w Warszawie; Indonesian: Kedutaan Besar Republik Indonesia di Warsawa) is the diplomatic mission of the Republic of Indonesia to the Republic of Poland. The current ambassador is Anita Lidya Luhulima who was appointed by President Joko Widodo on 17 November 2021.

== History ==
Diplomatic relations between Indonesia and Poland started in 1955. Until 12 May 1960, the Indonesian embassy in Prague, Czechoslovakia was accredited to Poland. Then until 18 November 1960, the Indonesian embassy in Moscow, Soviet Union was accredited to Poland. In the same year, a diplomatic mission was established in Warsaw.

The office of the mission was first located in Bristol Hotel at 42/44 Krakowskie Przedmieście. After a year at the hotel, the diplomatic mission moved several times, including to 14 Niegolewskiego (1962–1978) and to a villa that was designed by Lucjan Korngold. Then the offices moved to 9 Wąchocka (1979–2001), which is now the official residence of the ambassador called Wisma Duta, then to 8 Zakopiańska 8 (2001), and finally to its current location at 3/5 Estońskiej.

== See also ==
- Indonesia–Poland relations
- List of diplomatic missions of Indonesia
- List of diplomatic missions of Poland

== Gallery ==
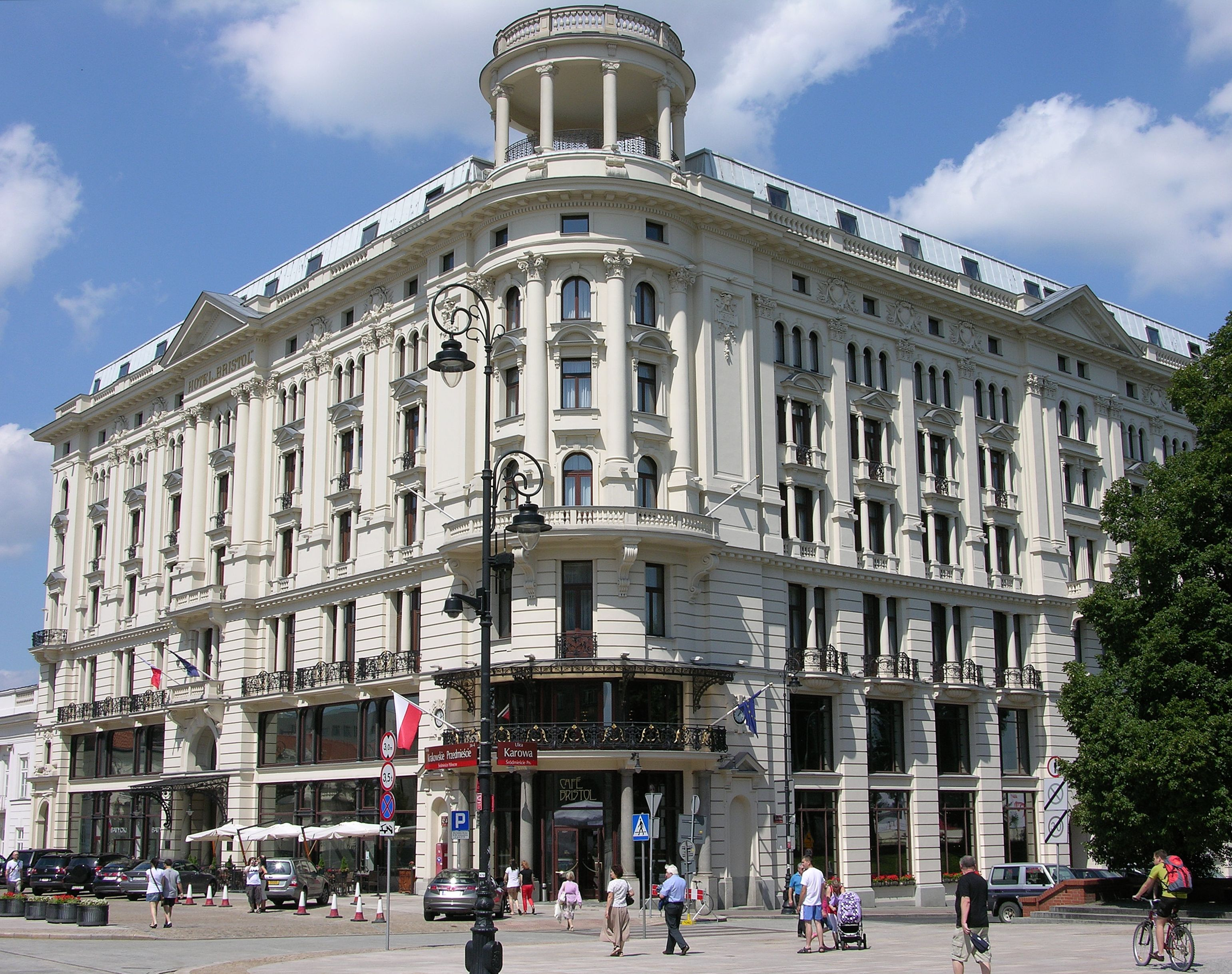
Hotel Bristol in Warsaw, the location of the first Indonesian diplomatic mission in Poland

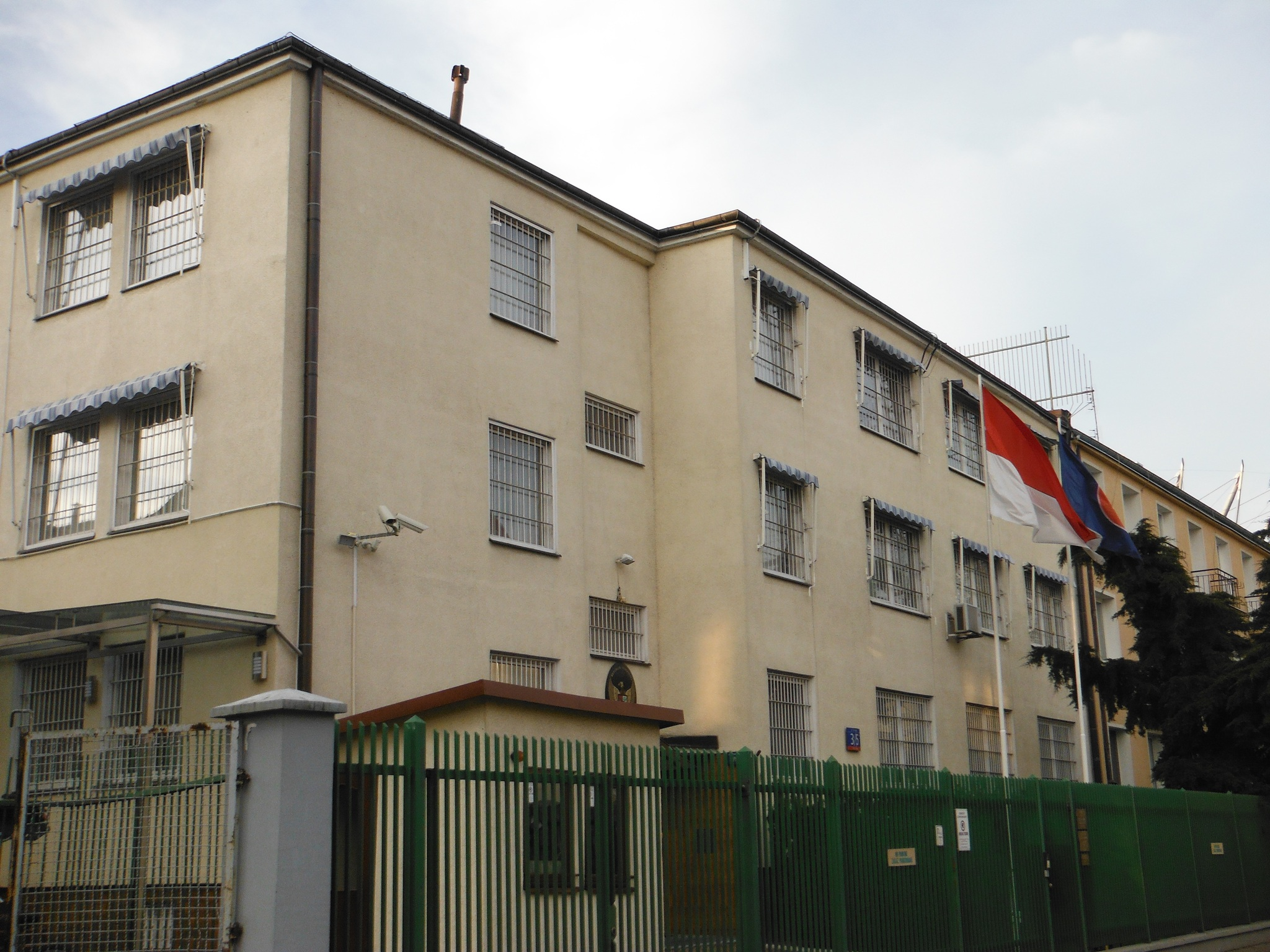
Chancery at 3/5 Estońskiej (2013)

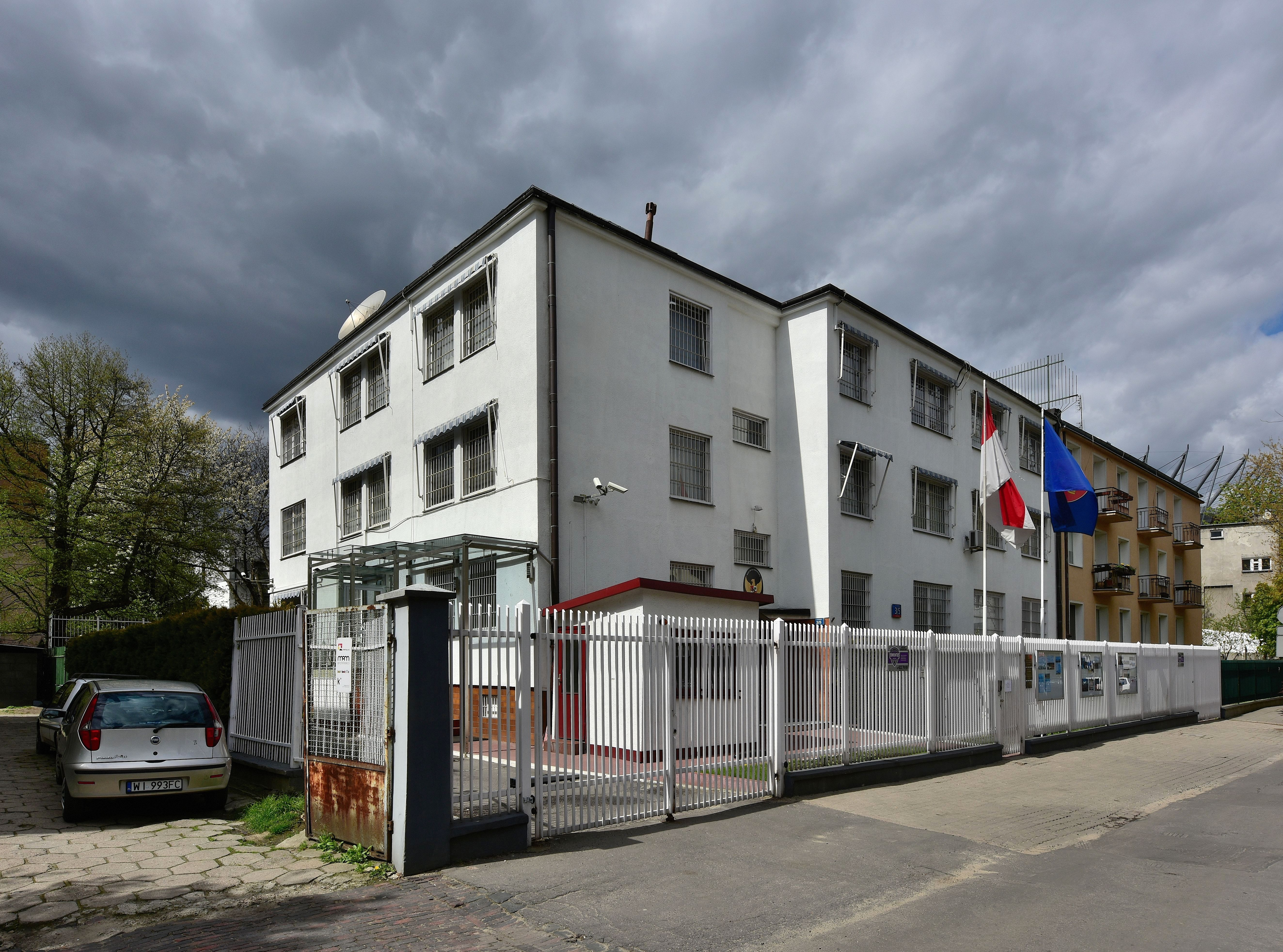
Chancery at 3/5 Estońskiej (2017)

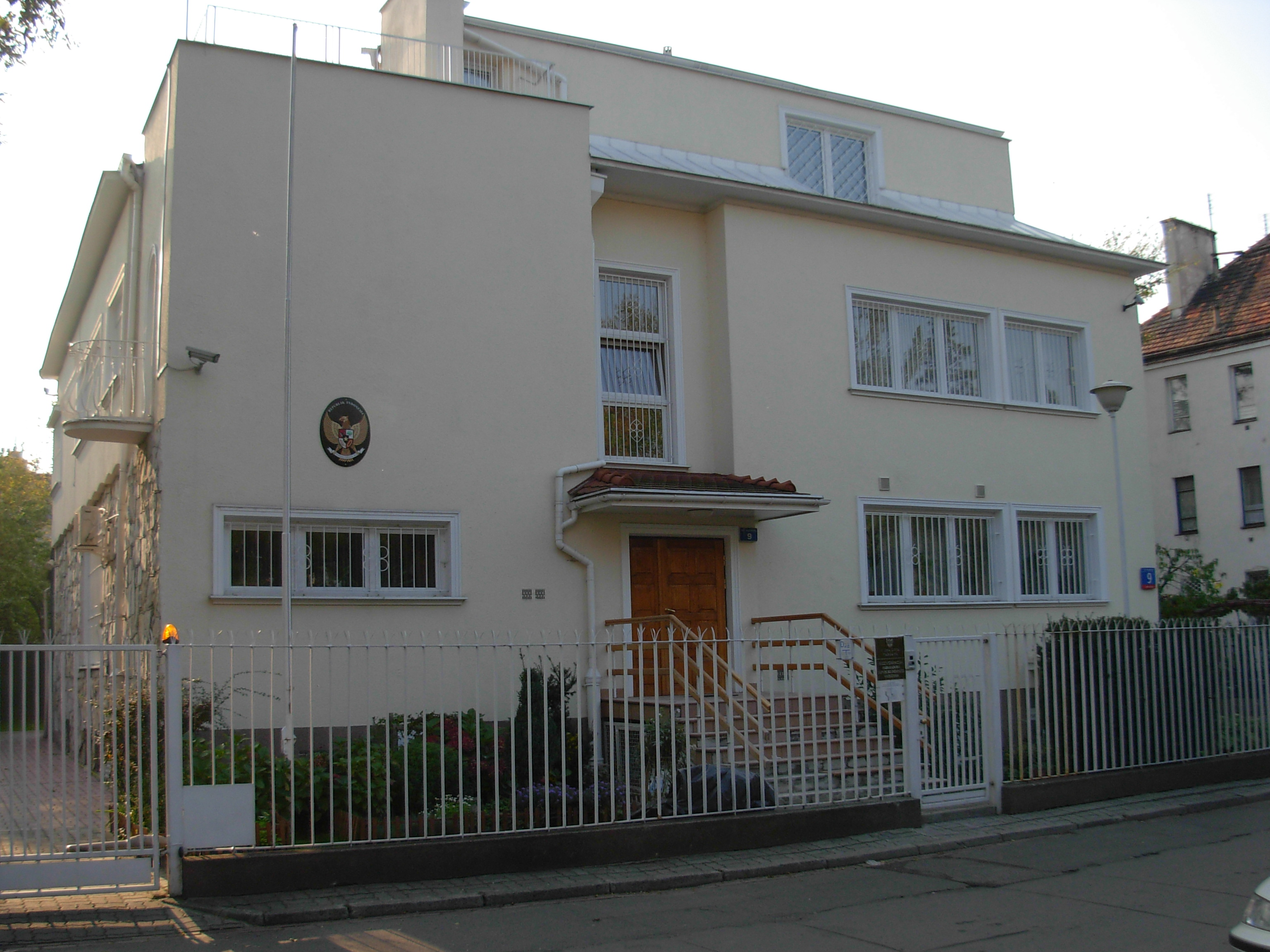
Wisma Duta, the official residence of the ambassador at 9 Wąchocka
