= Australia–Poland relations =

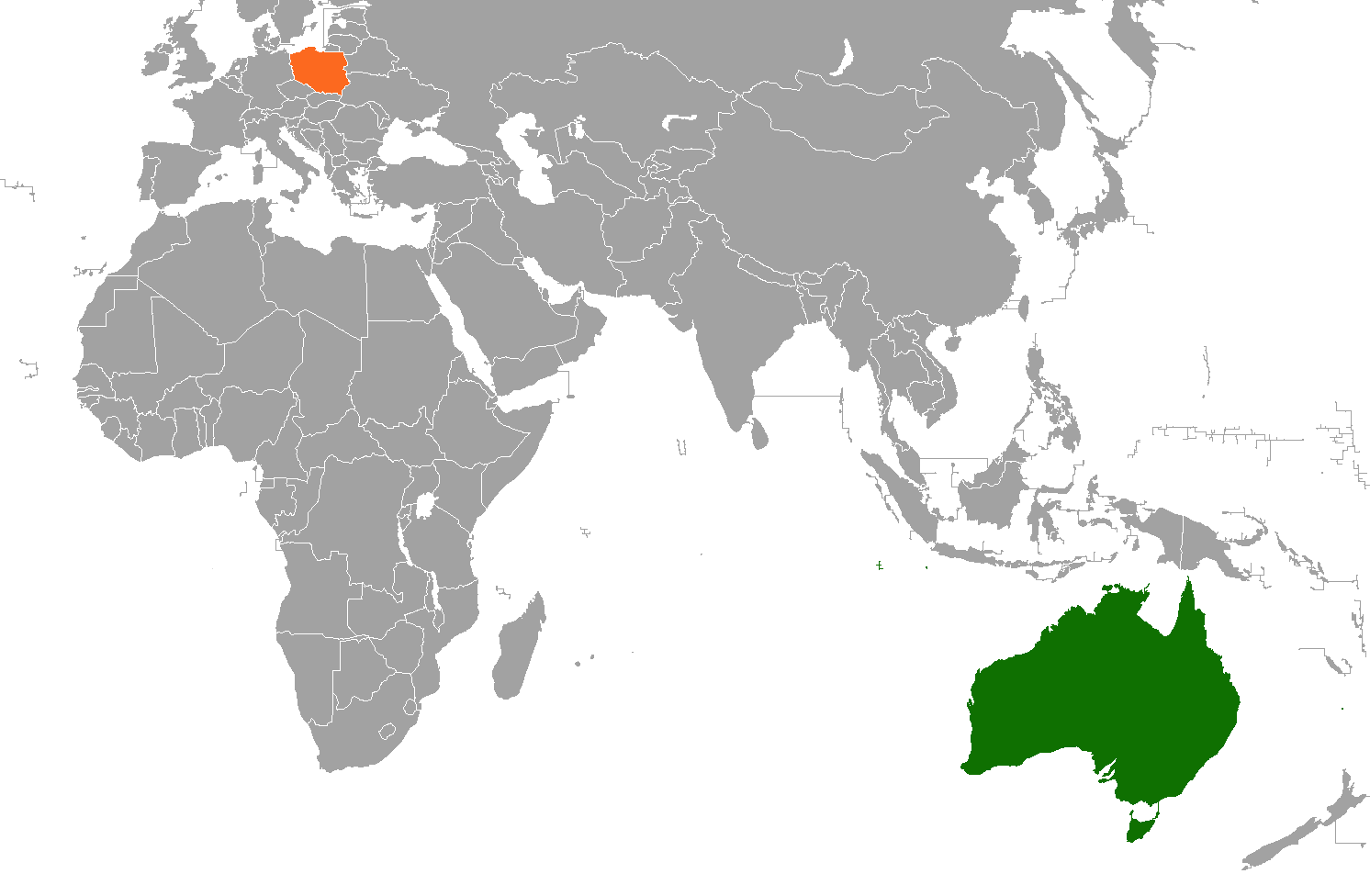

- Australia: Poland

Diplomatic mission
- Embassy of Australia, Warsaw: Embassy of Poland, Canberra

Envoy
- Ambassador Benjamin Albert Hayes: Chargé d’affaires Agata Utnicka

Diplomatic relations exist between Australia and Poland. Over 170,000 Australian citizens are of Polish descent. Both nations are members of the Australia Group and the Organisation for Economic Co-operation and Development.

== History ==
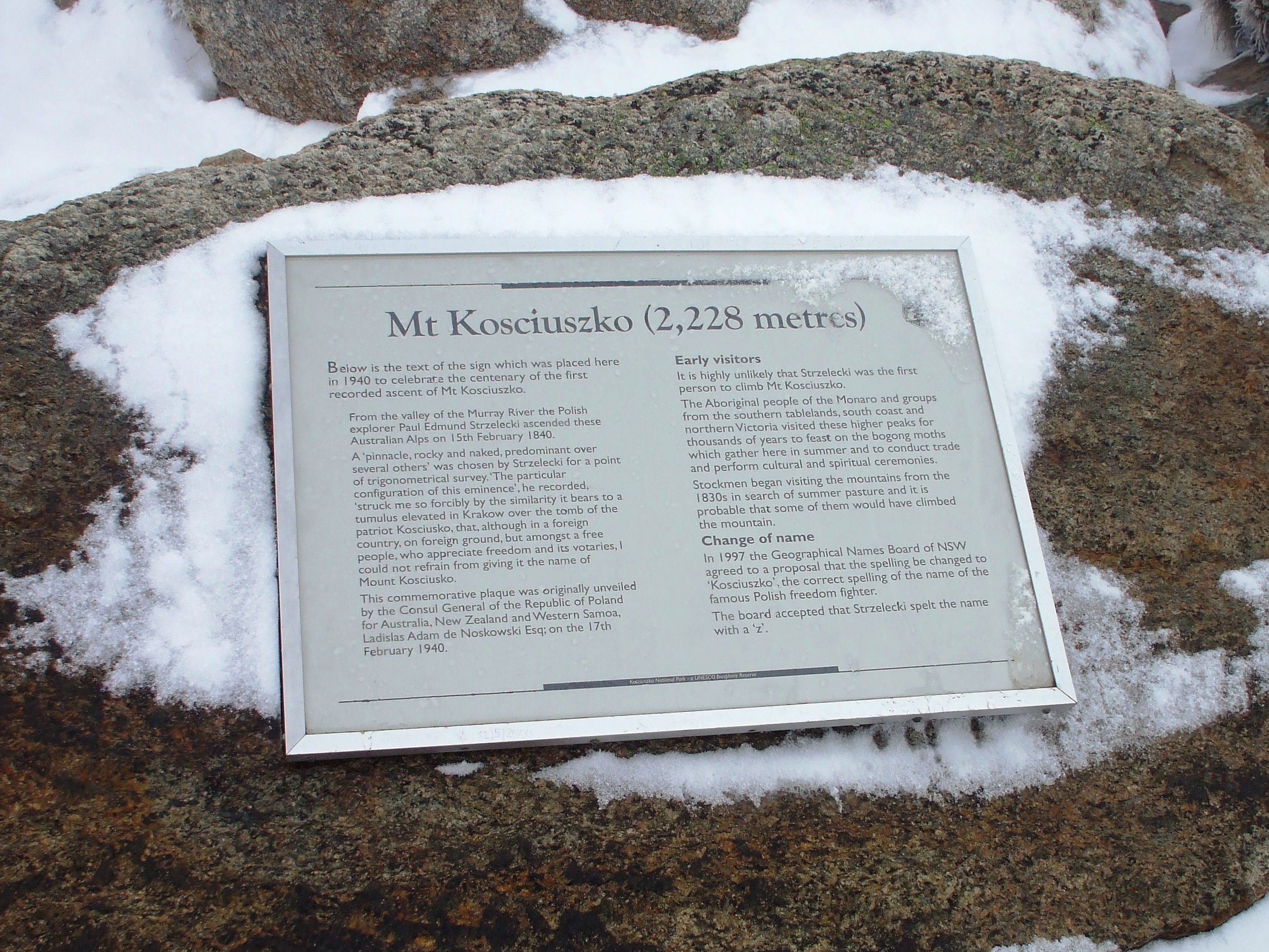
Plaque commemorating the name of Mount Kosciuszko, Australia's highest peak, after Polish Freedom Fighter Tadeusz Kościuszko.

The first Polish citizens to arrive to Australia was in December 1696. The 10 Polish citizens sailed with Dutch explorer Willem de Vlamingh during his exploration of Western Australia. The first known Pole to settle in Australia was Joseph Potaski who arrived to Hobart, Tasmania as a convict, along with his family, in 1803. For the next 40 years, dozens of Polish migrants arrived and settled in Australia.

In the early 1900s, diplomatic relations between Australia and Poland were conducted via-London when Australia was part of the British Empire. Following World War I, Poland regained independence in 1918 and then established a consulate in Sydney in 1919 and a consulate in Melbourne in 1931. Both consulates, however, were closed immediately after the German invasion of Poland in September 1939. Australia declared war on Germany on 3 September 1939, the third day of the German invasion of Poland, which started World War II. Australian and Polish troops fought together in the Italian Campaign, especially during the Battle of Monte Cassino. Australian prisoners of war were among Allied POWs held in German POW camps operated in occupied Poland. Australian soldier Walter Edward Smith, who escaped from the Stalag XX-A camp and then joined the Polish resistance and fought in the Warsaw Uprising, is the first foreigner to be awarded the Warsaw Uprising Cross. In Żagań, Poland, there is a memorial to the victims of the German-perpetrated Stalag Luft III murders, including Poles and Australians. After the war, Poland re-emerged, although with different borders than it had prior to the war and with a Soviet-installed communist regime.

From 1947 to 1966, over 61,000 Polish migrants immigrated to Australia. Many of the Polish migrants were veterans, displaced persons, survivors of labour and concentration camps, prisoner-of-war camps or immigration detention camps. In February 1972, Australia and Poland officially established diplomatic relations. That same year, Poland opened an embassy in Canberra. Australia opened an embassy in Warsaw in September 1973.

Throughout the 1980s, Poland experienced the Solidarity ("Solidarność") movement which eventually contributed to the fall of communism in the country. During that time period, over 25,000 “Solidarity” migrants immigrated to Australia.

== High level visits ==
Monthly value of Australian merchandise exports to Poland (A$ millions) since 1988

Monthly value of Polish merchandise exports to Australia (A$ millions) since 1988

The highest visit occurred in September 2000 when Polish President Aleksander Kwaśniewski paid a visit to Australia and attended the opening ceremony of the 2000 Summer Olympics being held in Sydney. In May 2013, Polish Foreign Minister Radosław Sikorski paid an official visit to Australia. The visit was soon reciprocated by Australian Foreign Minister Julie Bishop in March 2014, at which time both nations signed a Working holiday visa agreement. In 2013, both nations celebrated 40 years since the establishment of diplomatic relations.

== Bilateral relations ==
Since establishing diplomatic relations in 1972, both nations have signed numerous agreements such as an Investment and Promotion and Protection Agreement (1991); Double Taxation Agreement (1991); Extradition Treaty (1999); Air Services Agreement (2005); a Joint Communiqué on Cooperation in Environmental Technologies, Goods and Services (2006); and a Social Security Agreement (2010).

In 2012, Australia donated A$500,000 to the Auschwitz-Birkenau Foundation to preserve the death camps of Auschwitz-Birkenau in Poland. In August 2021, Poland resold slightly over one million Pfizer/BioNTech COVID-19 vaccines to Australia on a non-profit basis. Australian Prime Minister Scott Morrison personally thanked his Polish counterpart Mateusz Morawiecki for the deal, saying Morawiecki had been motivated by the ongoing outbreak in Sydney.

== Trade ==
In 2018, trade between Australia and Poland totaled US$1.1 billion. Australia's main exports to Poland include coal, copper ores and concentrates, zinc ores and concentrates and medicaments. Poland's main exports to Australia include silver and platinum, mechanical handling equipment and parts, goods vehicles and passenger motor vehicles.

== Resident diplomatic missions ==
- Australia has an embassy in Warsaw.
- Poland has an embassy in Canberra and a consulate-general in Sydney.

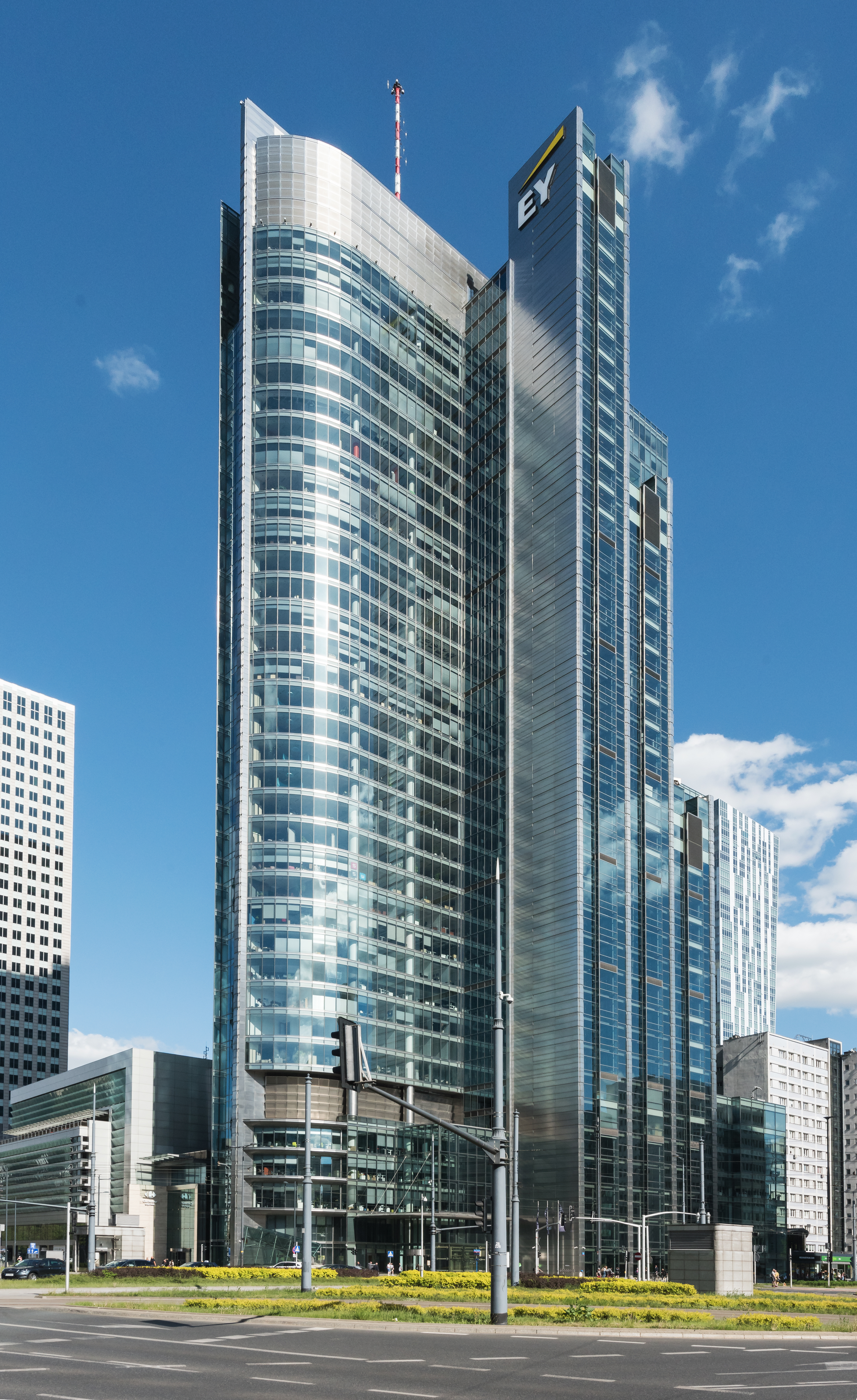
Embassy of Australia in Warsaw

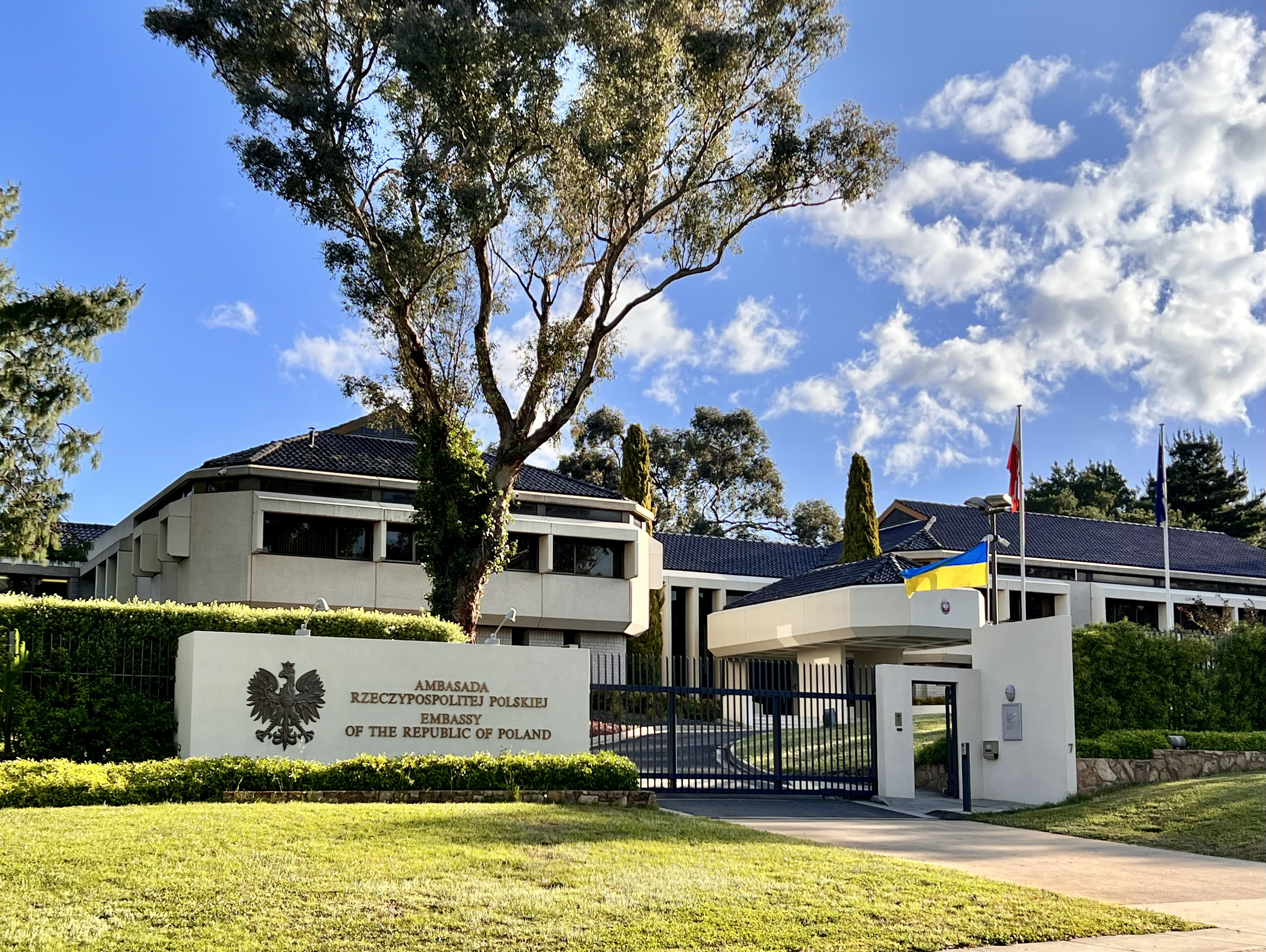
Embassy of Poland in Canberra

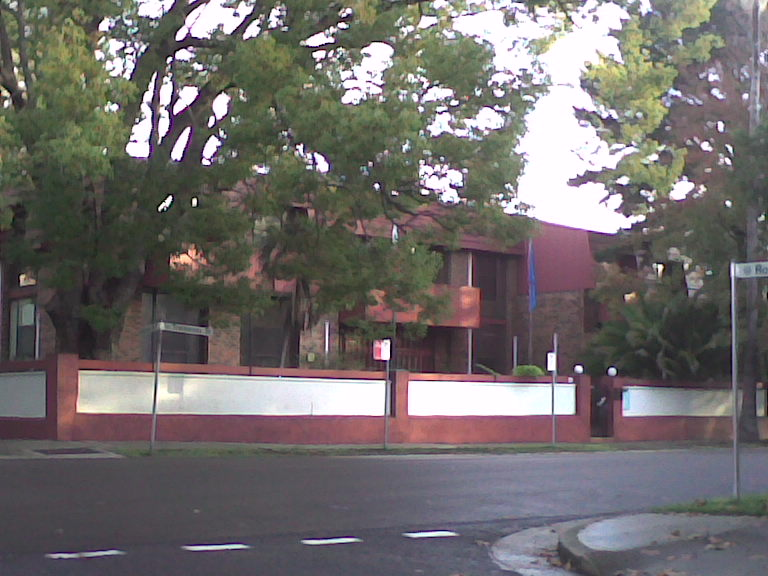
Consulate-General of Poland in Sydney

== See also ==
- Foreign relations of Australia
- Foreign relations of Poland
