= Indonesia–Poland relations =

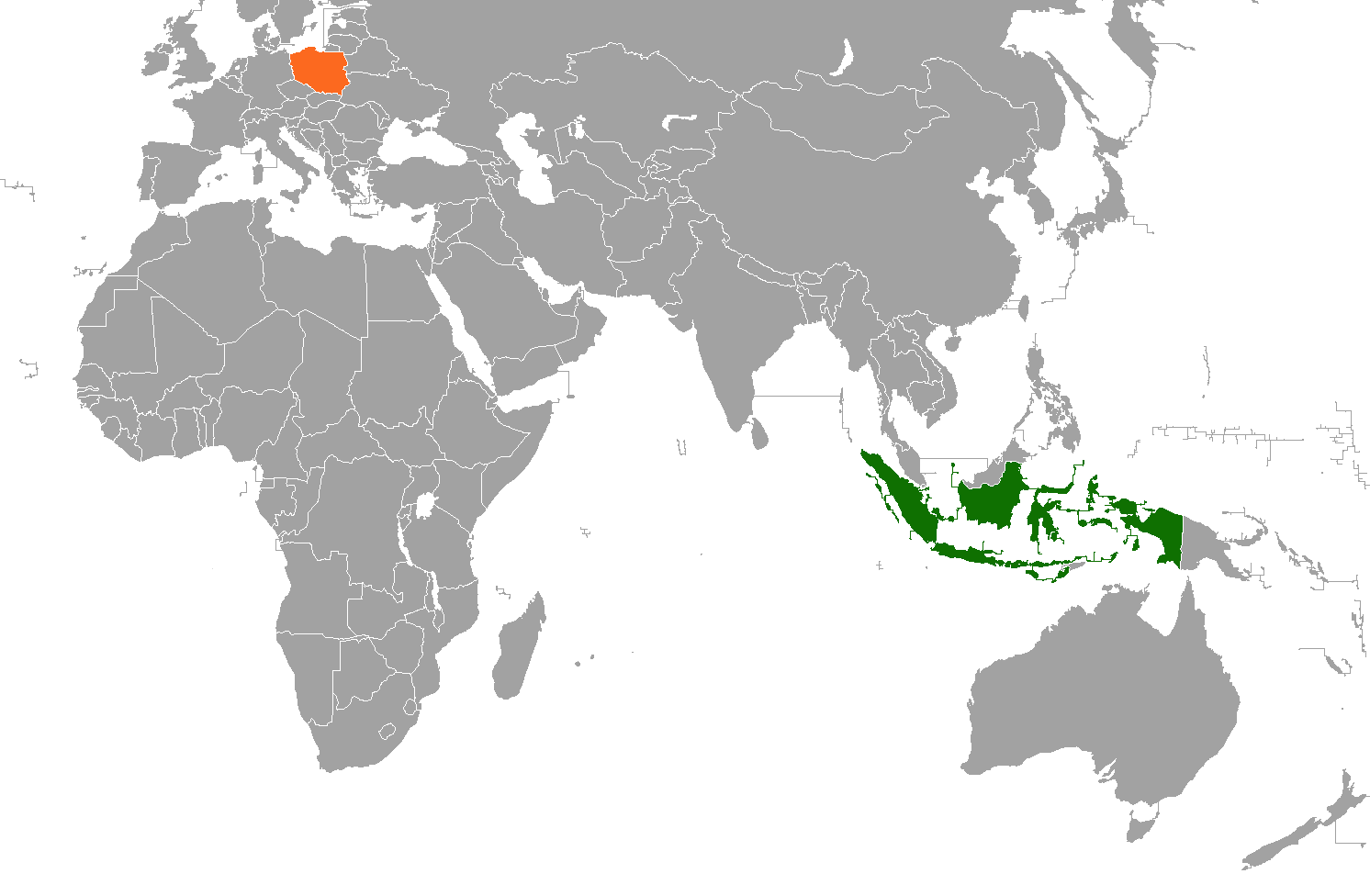
- Indonesia: Poland

Diplomatic mission
- Embassy of Indonesia, Warsaw: Embassy of Poland, Jakarta

Indonesia and Poland established diplomatic relations on 19 September 1955. Indonesia has an embassy in Warsaw, while Poland has an embassy in Jakarta. Besides similar red-and-white flags, Indonesia and Poland share a similar course of history through enduring revolutions, wars for independence and maintaining national unity. Both nations have agreed to expand bilateral relations in trade, culture and education sectors, through programs such as staging art exhibitions to proposing student exchange programs and provide scholarships.

== History ==
The historical links between Poland and Indonesia dates back to the colonial era of Dutch East Indies. Circa 19th century Polish people began to migrate to East Indies. The former Medan's airport Polonia was named after Poland. The airport was built on a tobacco plantation once owned by Baron Michalsky in 1872, a Polish immigrant that named his estate "Polonia", a Latin name for Poland.

Following the restoration of independent Poland after World War I, an honorary consulate of Poland in Batavia was founded in 1921, and an honorary vice-consulate in Semarang was founded in 1938.

Polish and Indonesian military contingents cooperated as part of the UNEF II peacekeeping mission in the Sinai Peninsula in the 1970s, with the Poles providing transportation for Indonesian troops and equipment.

Polish rescue workers and medics took part in the relief operation after the 2006 Yogyakarta earthquake. The Indonesian Ambassador to Poland Hendra S. Pramana has personally thanked the rescuers upon their return to Poland.

In 2006, a defense cooperation agreement was signed in Jakarta.

== High level visits ==
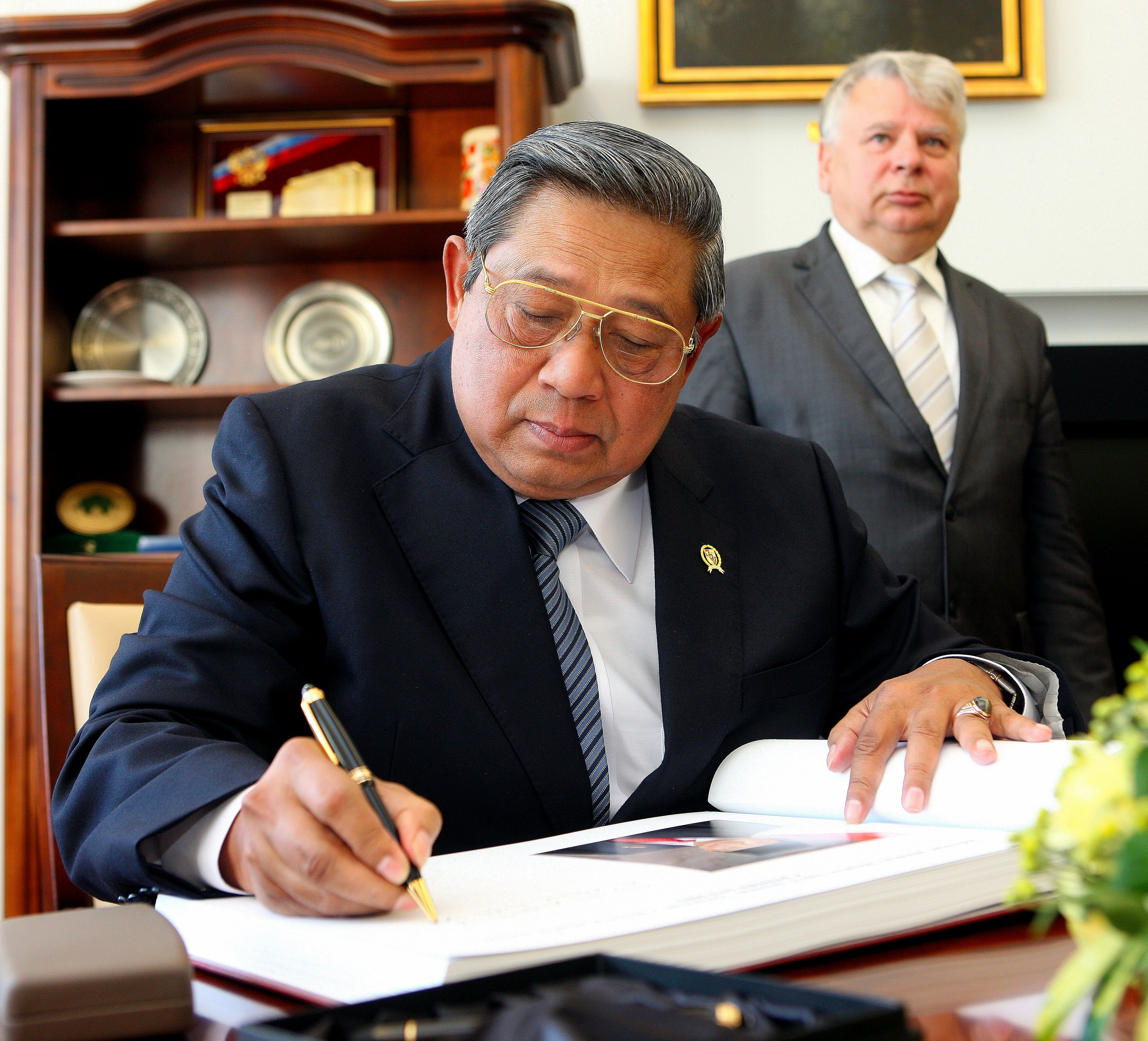
Visit of President of Indonesia Susilo Bambang Yudhoyono to the Senate of Poland in 2013

The first high level visit from Indonesia was President Sukarno visit to Poland in 1959, followed 44 years later by his daughter President Megawati Sukarnoputri in 2003. President Susilo Bambang Yudhoyono also made a state visit to Poland in 2013. Meanwhile, the first Polish president to visit Indonesia was President Aleksander Kwaśniewski in 2004 and then followed by PM Marek Belka in 2005. In January 2013 the Polish Parliament delegation led by Krzysztof Klosowski visited their counterparts Indonesian Parliament in Jakarta. On 28 June 2022, President Joko Widodo made a transit in Rzeszów and Przemyśl en route to Kyiv by train.

== Trade and investment ==
In 2011 Polish exports to Indonesia is 1.1 trillion rupiah (US$121 million), while its imports reached 6.6 trillion rupiah (US$720 million), making the trade balance heavily in favor to Indonesia. Poland mainly sells machinery, military equipments and weapons, and chemicals to Indonesia, while buying coal, textiles, wooden furniture, crude palm oil, and agricultural products from Indonesia. Usually the Indonesian-origin furnitures are being finished in Poland and re-export to other European markets.

Polish investment in Indonesia in 1st quarter of 2012 reached US$7 million in electronics and intermodal container. While the Polish investments in coal mining, furniture and agriculture show the figure US$155 million.

== See also ==
- Foreign relations of Indonesia
- Foreign relations of Poland
