= Lan Fu =

Deputy mayor of Xiamen, China

Lan Fu (Chinese: 藍甫) is a former deputy mayor of Xiamen, China. He was convicted in 2000 on corruption charges related to a US$6 billion smuggling racket and is currently serving a life sentence in prison.

On June 4, 2005, former Chinese diplomat Chen Yonglin alleged that, earlier in 2000, Lan's son, Lan Meng, had been kidnapped from his university in Sydney, Australia by Chinese agents. Chen contended that Meng was kidnapped to compel his dissident father to return to China. However, Lan was never accused of dissidence and his lawyer, Zhu Yongping, denied that kidnapping played a part in Lan's return. Zhu insisted his client had given himself up voluntarily. On June 10, Chen appeared to retract the accusation, commenting only that, "I said that in fear, and I don't want to talk about it again."

On June 22, however, Chen provided further details, naming Zhang Jin, deputy director of the Third Department of the Chinese Ministry of Public Security, as the official responsible for the abduction. He also alleged that a drug called "du zing" was used to render Lan Meng unconscious and that he was transferred via fishing boat to a Chinese cargo ship.

An investigation by the Weekend Australian found that Lan Meng, then 18, was living in the Melbourne suburb of Sandringham from November 1999 until November 2000. They determined that he was in Australia for at least three months before Lan Fu returned to China. Lan Meng was located in Melbourne by the Australian Federal Police on July 7 and, when interviewed, requested that his statements be kept secret. On the basis of his testimony, the AFP "concluded there's no substance to the allegation."

Other Australian media have also reported on the alleged kidnapping claim.
