= Margaret Adamson =

Australian diplomat

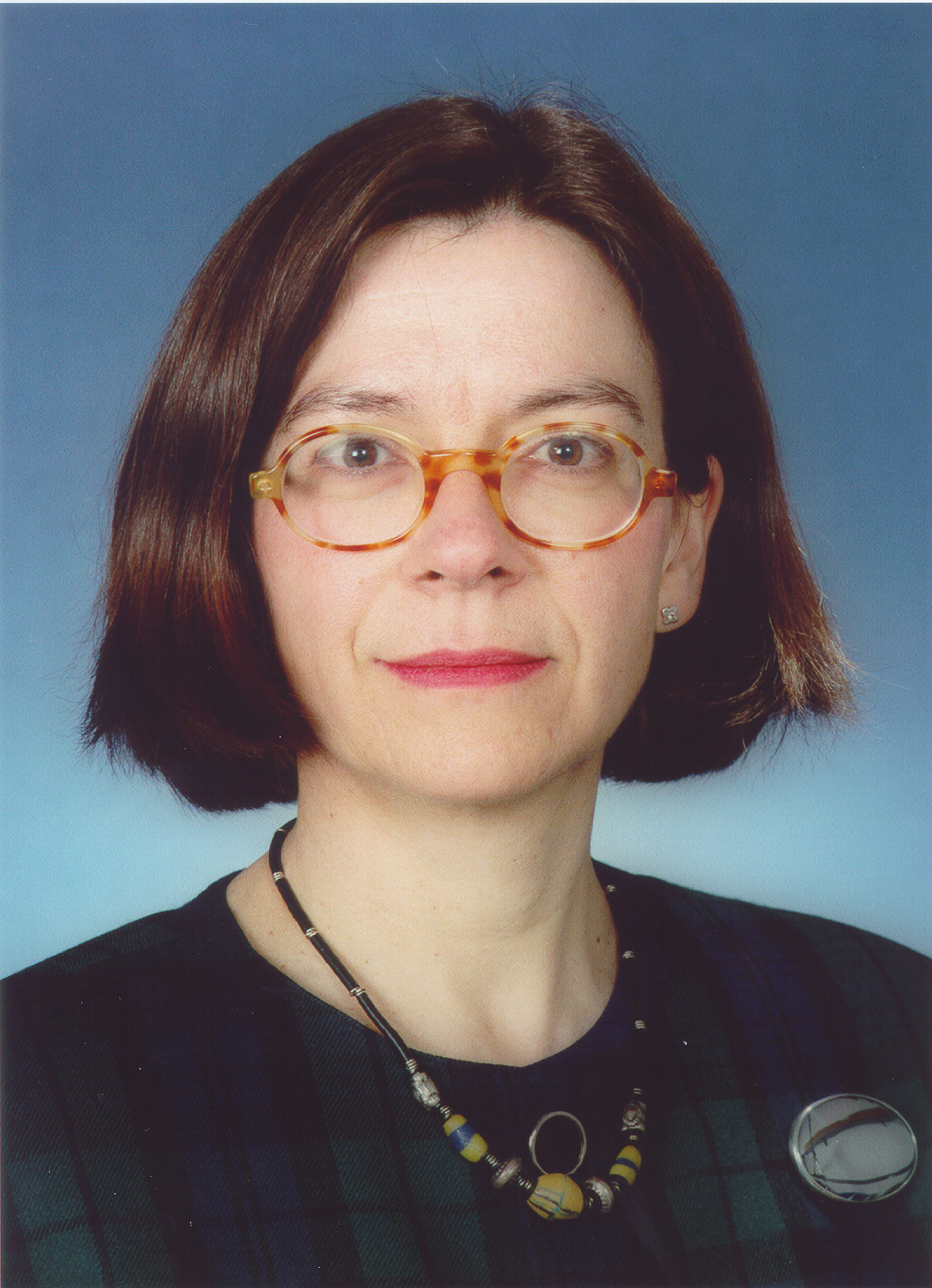
Margaret Adamson in 2014

Margaret Adamson is an Australian diplomat who has served as Deputy High Commissioner to Papua New Guinea; Ambassador to Cambodia; Ambassador to Poland; Consul General to Berlin; and High Commissioner to Pakistan.

== Education ==
Adamson graduated from Australian National University with a BA in pure mathematics and psychology with a minor in Sociology in 1974 and a Diploma of Education at the University of Canberra.

== Diplomatic career ==
Adamson served in the Australian diplomatic missions to Hanoi and Vienna after graduation. From 1987 to 1991, she served as a counsellor for the Australian embassy in Bonn, and after German reunification, until 1996 in Berlin.

From 1998 to 2002, she served as Ambassador to Poland. Following her return from Poland, she became a senior official within the Australian Department of Foreign Affairs and Trade. In 2007, she was named Ambassador to Cambodia, taking over from Lisa Filipetto. She was posted as High Commissioner to Pakistan from 2015 to 2019.

== Programs and initiatives ==
Adamson has used her appointments to promote initiatives serving women. Making use of 39 million dollars in funding the Australian government obtained through the World Bank she coordinated with the Pakistani government to create a program to increase nutrition in Balochistan and Khyber-Pakhtunkhwa with an emphasis on women and girls.

Diplomatic posts
Preceded by Jonathan Thwaites	List of ambassadors of Australia to Poland; 1998–2002	Succeeded by Patrick Lawless
Preceded by Lisa Filipetto	List of ambassadors of Australia to Cambodia; 2007–2010	Succeeded by Penny Richards
Preceded by Peter Heyward	List of high commissioners of Australia to Pakistan; 2015–2019	Succeeded by Geoffrey Shaw
