= Anne Plunkett =

Australian diplomat

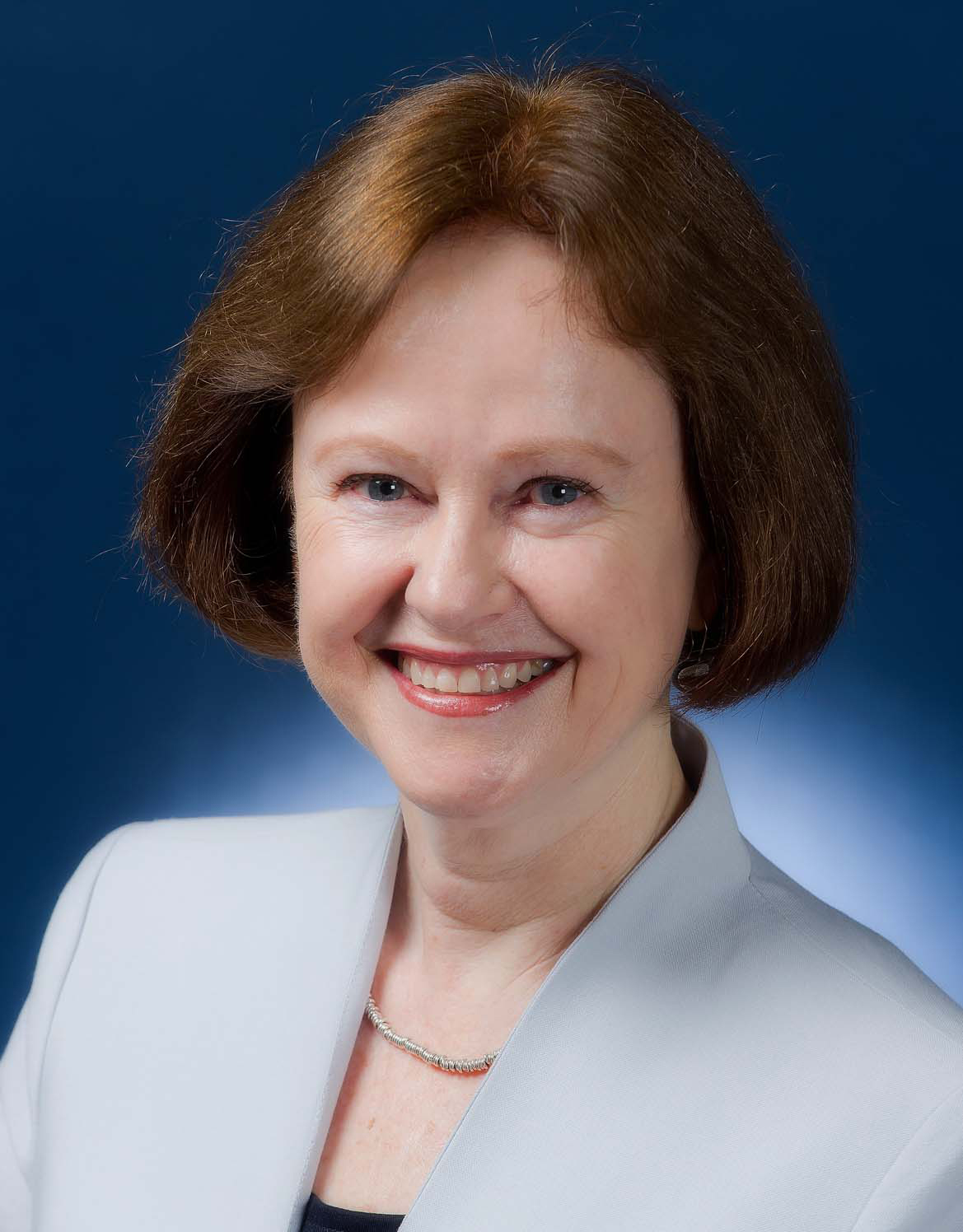
- Anne Plunkett in 2013
- Born: Anne Maree Plunkett; 1952 (age 73–74); Armidale, New South Wales, Australia
- Education: University of New England
- Occupations: Public servant and diplomat

Anne Maree Plunkett (born 1952) is a senior Australian public servant and career diplomat. She was the Australian Ambassador to Portugal from 2012 to 2016, with non-resident accreditation to Cape Verde and São Tomé and Príncipe. She was previously Australian Ambassador to Ireland and the Holy See (Vatican) between 2006 and 2008.

== Early life and education ==
Plunkett was born in Armidale, New South Wales, in 1952. She holds a Bachelor of Arts (Honours) from the University of New England.

== Career ==
Plunkett's first diplomatic position was deputy consul in Honolulu, from 1974 to 1976. She spent the next three years as third secretary of the Australian High Commission in Dar es Salaam. She was also posted to Fiji (as First secretary), India, Tanzania and Hawaii.

Plunkett also held a number of positions in the Department of Foreign Affairs and Trade in Canberra. In 2005, as Director of Protocol in the department, Plunkett met with would-be Chinese defector Chen Yonglin to advise that the Australian Government expects resident foreign diplomats to return to their countries at the end of their postings.

In January 2006, Plunkett was appointed Australian Ambassador to Ireland, with concurrent accreditation to the Holy See. Her Holy See appointment was formalised by Pope Benedict XVI on 18 May 2006 when he accepted her letters of credence. While Ambassador to the Holy See, Plunkett accepted a Papal rebuke over Australia's treatment of its Aboriginal people, when the Pope called for ongoing attention to the social situation of Aboriginal people. As ambassador in Ireland, during her frequent public appearances, Plunkett was noted for her ability to "pepper" ambassadorial speeches with "amusing anecdotes."

In July 2008, the Australian Government elected to appoint a resident ambassador to the Holy See and Plunkett's role in the Vatican was handed on to another appointee. She continued as Ambassador to Ireland.

From November 2009 to December 2011, Plunkett was Assistant Secretary, Protocol Branch and Chief of Protocol.

In May 2012, Plunkett was appointed Australian Ambassador to Portugal, with non-resident accreditation to Cape Verde and São Tomé and Príncipe. She took up her appointment at the end of the year, and presented her credentials to the Portuguese Government in April 2013. Her appointment in Portugal concluded on 19 April 2016.

Diplomatic posts
Preceded by John Herron	Australian Ambassador to Ireland; 2006 – 2008	Succeeded by Bruce Davis
Preceded by John Herron	Australian Ambassador to the Holy See; 2006 – 2008	Succeeded by Tim Fischer
Preceded by Patrick Lawless	Australian Ambassador to Portugal; 2012 – 2016	Succeeded by Peter Rayner
