= Patrick Twomey =

Patrick Joseph Twomey MBE (22 February 1892 – 1963) was a New Zealand Marist brother, meter reader and leprosy fund-raiser. He was born in Wellington on 22 February 1892.

Twomey devoted most of life in service of lepers and sufferers of tropical diseases in the South West Pacific. He was a member of the Leper Trust Board, and served as its secretary from 1942 until his death in 1963. He also served as a member of the Home Guard during World War II.

In the 1947 New Year Honours Twomey was appointed a Member of the Order of the British Empire. In 1953, he was awarded the Queen Elizabeth II Coronation Medal. He was also awarded the Chevalier of the Légion d’honneur by the French in 1956. Twomey died in Suva on 1 August 1963.
