= List of ambassadors of Australia to Poland =

Ambassador of Australia to Poland

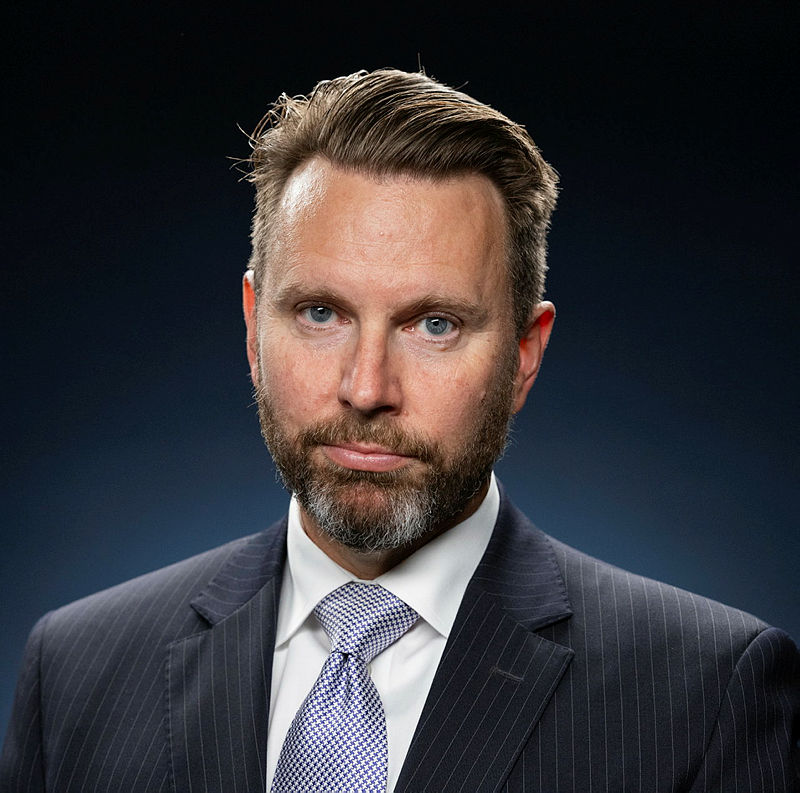
- Incumbent; Benjamin Hayes since 20 January 2024
- Department of Foreign Affairs and Trade
- Style: His Excellency
- Reports to: Minister for Foreign Affairs
- Residence: Warsaw
- Nominator: Prime Minister of Australia
- Appointer: Governor General of Australia
- Inaugural holder: L. J. Lawrey (resident in Moscow)
- Formation: 1972

The ambassador of Australia to Poland is an officer of the Australian Department of Foreign Affairs and Trade and the head of the Embassy of the Commonwealth of Australia to the Republic of Poland. The ambassador is located in Warsaw and also holds non-resident accreditation for Lithuania (since 2013) and the Czech Republic (and formerly Czechoslovakia, 1978–1990; since 1994). From 29 June 1990 to September 1994 there was a resident embassy in Prague. The current ambassador, since January 2024, is Benjamin Hayes.

The Australian Government has maintained a diplomatic relationship with Poland since 1972. Between June 1972 and September 1973 the Australian Ambassador in Moscow was dually accredited to Warsaw. In 1973, Francis Stuart became the first resident Ambassador to the country.

== Officeholders ==
=== Heads of mission ===
Ordinal	Officeholder	Title	Other offices	Residency	Term start date	Term end date	Time in office	Notes
1	Lawrence John Lawrey	Ambassador of Australia to Poland		Moscow, USSR	June 1972	September 1973	1 year, 3 months	
(n/a)	Peter James Lloyd AM	Charge d’Affaires		Warsaw, Poland	16 July 1973	13 August 1973	28 days	
2	Francis Hamilton Stuart	Ambassador of Australia to Poland		Warsaw, Poland	1973	1977	3–4 years	
3	Bob Laurie	Ambassador of Australia to Poland	^{A}	Warsaw, Poland	1977	1980	2–3 years	
4	John Burgess	Ambassador of Australia to Poland	^{A}	Warsaw, Poland	1980	1984	3–4 years	
5	Max Hughes	Ambassador of Australia to Poland	^{A}	Warsaw, Poland	1985	1987	1–2 years	
6	Lawry W. Herron	Ambassador of Australia to Poland	^{A}	Warsaw, Poland	1987	1991	3–4 years	
7	Anthony Kevin	Ambassador of Australia to Poland		Warsaw, Poland	1991	1994	2–3 years	
8	Jonathan Thwaites	Ambassador of Australia to Poland	^{B}	Warsaw, Poland	1994	1998	3–4 years	
9	Margaret Adamson	Ambassador of Australia to Poland	^{B}	Warsaw, Poland	1998	2002	3–4 years	
10	Patrick Lawless	Ambassador of Australia to Poland	^{B}	Warsaw, Poland	2002	2005	2–3 years	
11	Ian Forsyth	Ambassador of Australia to Poland	^{B}	Warsaw, Poland	2005	2008	2–3 years	
12	Ruth Pearce	Ambassador of Australia to Poland	^{B}	Warsaw, Poland	2008	2012	0 years	
13	Jean Dunn	Ambassador of Australia to Poland	^{B}^{C}	Warsaw, Poland	2012	2016	0 years	
14	Paul Wojciechowski	Ambassador of Australia to Poland	^{B}^{C}	Warsaw, Poland	January 2016	2019	2–3 years	
15	Lloyd Brodrick	Ambassador of Australia to Poland	^{B}^{C}	Warsaw, Poland	29 November 2019	2024	4–5 years	
15	Benjamin Hayes	Ambassador of Australia to Poland		Warsaw, Poland	20 January 2024	incumbent	2 years, 230 days	

==== Notes ====
^A: Also served as non-resident Ambassador of Australia to Czechoslovakia, between 1978 and 1990.
^B: Also served as non-resident Ambassador of Australia to the Czech Republic, since 1994.
^C: Also served as non-resident Ambassador of Australia to the Republic of Lithuania, since 2013.

=== Resident ambassadors to Czechoslovakia/Czech Republic ===
Name	Start of term	End of term	References
Tony Vincent	29 June 1990	September 1994	

== See also ==
- Australia–Lithuania relations
- Australia–Poland relations
