= Jadwiga Dobrzyńska =

Polish architect

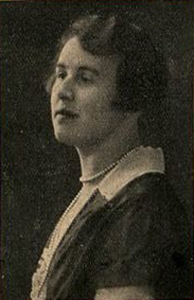
- Born: 1898; Warsaw, Poland
- Died: 1 February 1940 (aged 41–42); Warsaw, Poland
- Occupation: Architect

Jadwiga Dobrzyńska (1898 – 1 February 1940) was a Polish architect. Her work was part of the architecture event in the art competition at the 1928 Summer Olympics. She was one of the first female graduates of the Warsaw University of Technology's Faculty of Architecture in 1922.
