= Zygmunt Łoboda =

Polish architect

- Born: 24 April 1895
- Died: 8 April 1945 (aged 49); Flossenbürg concentration camp, Germany
- Occupation: Architect

Zygmunt Łoboda (24 April 1895 – 8 April 1945) was a Polish architect. His work was part of the architecture event in the art competition at the 1928 Summer Olympics. He was killed in the Flossenbürg concentration camp during World War II.
