= All-Party Parliamentary Group on Human Rights =

UK parliamentary group

Parliamentary Human Rights Group
- Founded: 1976
- Founder: Eric Lubbock, 4th Baron Avebury
- Type: Educational charity
- Location: London, United Kingdom
- Coordinates: 51.499551°N 0.124066°W
- Method: advocacy
- Key people: Fabian Hamilton MP (Chair); Ann Clwyd MP (Former Chair); Eric Lubbock, 4th Baron Avebury (Former Chairman, Vice-Chairman); Jeremy Corbyn (Former Vice-Chairman)
- Website: appghumanrights.com

The APPG for Human Rights, alternatively known as the Parliamentary Human Rights Group (PHRG) is a group within the Parliament of the United Kingdom consisting of members from all political parties. Its role is to promote and facilitate human rights work by politicians who usually spend most of their time dealing with matters that affect their local constituency.

== History ==
PHRG was founded in 1976 by Eric Lubbock, Lord Avebury, after he was encouraged to concentrate more on international human rights by Martin Ennals, the then director of Amnesty International. Avebury was Chairman of PHRG until 1997 when Labour MP Ann Clwyd took over. Avebury remained Vice-Chair of PHRG along with Jeremy Corbyn MP until his death in 2016.

The organisation was run from Clwyd's office with funding from the Barrow Cadbury Trust. The APPG's chair is currently Fabian Hamilton.

The organisation undertakes activities such as writing briefings for UK attendees at the Inter-Parliamentary Union and organising meetings in Parliamentary committee rooms on diverse thematic and country-related human rights situations. They have held meetings on subjects ranging from statelessness to Dalit rights and undertaken country visits to Pakistan to report on the situation of the Ahmadiyya community.

The Human Rights Handbook (1979) stated situations which PHRG had advocated on in its first three years to include 'the abuse of psychiatry in the Soviet Union; human rights violations in Brazil, Argentina, Chile; human rights and the Press; Namibia; human rights and the UN...'

In December 2015, Clwyd stated in an article for Amnesty International that the UK should remain committed to the international human rights framework. This came at a time in which there was a growing perception that the British government, especially after the narrow Conservative victory in the 2015 General Election, had de-prioritised human rights as part of the work of the Foreign Office. Sir Simon McDonald, Permanent Secretary at the Foreign Office admitted to a Commons committee in 2015 that human rights work "was secondary also to the need to promote British companies abroad", according to The Independent.

Following the election of Jeremy Corbyn as Labour leader in 2015 and the death of Lord Avebury in 2016, new members such as SNP MP Margaret Ferrier joined the group.
