= Australian Consulate-General, Nouméa =

Australian Consul-General in Noumea, New Caledonia
- Coat of Arms of Australia

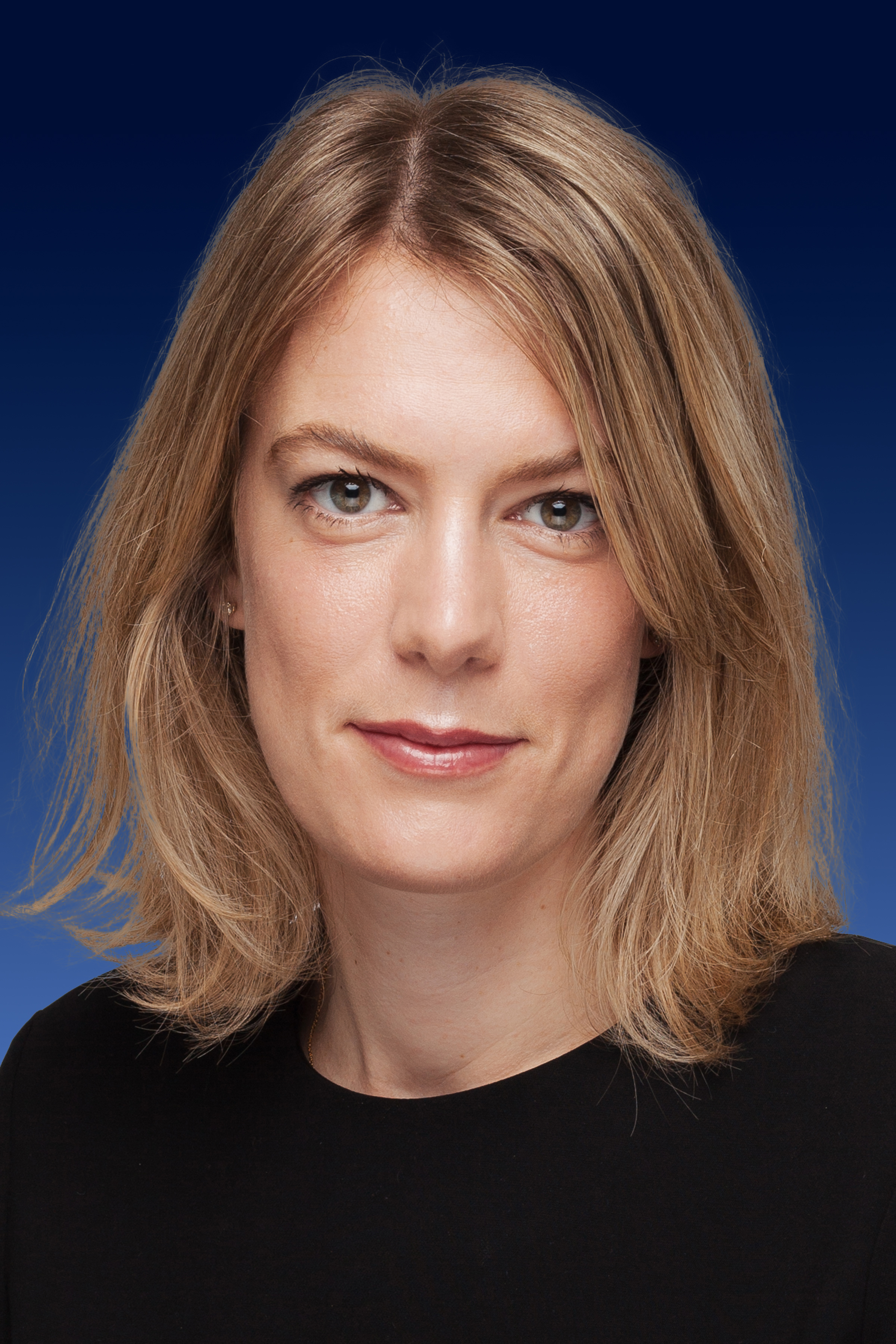
- Incumbent; Annelise Young since 6 July 2022
- Department of Foreign Affairs and Trade
- Style: Her Excellency
- Reports to: Minister for Foreign Affairs
- Nominator: Prime Minister of Australia
- Appointer: Governor General of Australia
- Inaugural holder: Bertram Ballard (Official Representative)
- Formation: 6 August 1940
- Website: Australian Consulate-General Noumea, New Caledonia - Wallis and Futuna

The Australian Consulate-General in Noumea, New Caledonia represents the Commonwealth of Australia in New Caledonia, a special collectivity of France, and is also accredited to the Pacific French Overseas collectivity of Wallis and Futuna (Australia's relations with French Polynesia are now handled by a separate consulate-general since 2021). The Consul-General also serves as Australia's representative to the Noumea-based Pacific Community. The Consulate-General, one of four in New Caledonia (alongside New Zealand, Indonesia and Vanuatu), has since 1976 had its offices at 19 avenue du Maréchal Foch, Nouméa.

The Australian Consulate-General in Nouméa reports directly to the Department of Foreign Affairs and Trade in Canberra, Australia, just as the Australian embassies and high commissions around the world and is Australia's fourth-oldest diplomatic posting (after London, 1910; Ottawa, 1939; and Washington, February 1940), having been established on 6 August 1940, when Bertram Ballard was posted to Nouméa. The consulate celebrated its 75th anniversary on 6 August 2015.

== Consulate history ==
First established on 6 August 1940 with the appointment of Bertram Ballard as Official Representative of the Commonwealth Government in Nouméa, Ballard's responsibilities included the "full power and authority on behalf of the Commonwealth Government to conduct discussions and/or to agree and conclude with the administration of New Caledonia any matters or agreements that may tend to the attainment of co-operation in 'the struggle against the Berlin-Rome Axis at the side of Great Britain' and to sign for an on behalf of the Commonwealth Government everything so agreed upon and concluded". However, the time of Ballard's appointment meant that the real reason for his appointment was to report to Canberra the situation inside the French colony, including the political sympathies of the colonial administration. The administration in Nouméa at the time was decidedly pro-Vichy French, but the Australian Government continued to be hesitant in encouraging a takeover of the colony or encouraging Free French elements in the colony.

However, Ballard's report of 8 September 1940 noted that the provisional Governor, Colonel Denis, was not likely to be accommodating to a settlement in any case and that the people of the colony would "welcome and follow" a Governor appointed by De Gaulle, spurred the Australian Government, led by Minister for External Affairs, John McEwen, into action. This action culminated in the Australian-backed rallying of New Caledonia to Free France, with HMAS Adelaide sent to escort Free French Governor-designate Henri Sautot to Nouméa on 19 September.

With the end of the war, the Official Representative's Office was upgraded to a Consulate, and the first consul appointed was Harold Stuart Barnett, appointed on 18 December 1945. From then until 20 February 1980, the agency was known as the Australian Consulate, when posting was upgraded to a Consulate-General.

=== 1987 recall incident ===
In January 1987, the French Government declared the serving Australian Consul-General, John Dauth, as "persona non grata", prompting his recall from the posting. The reasoning the French Government (represented by Minister for Overseas Departments and Territories, Bernard Pons) gave for Dauth's recall was that he "had provided aid to extremist members of the pro-independence FLNKS group which had links with Libya", an accusation that was firmly repudiated by Foreign Minister Bill Hayden, who called in the French representative in Canberra to register an official protest.

Hayden had noted that "Mr Dauth has done no more than the Australian Government expects of any government official representing its interests overseas" and it was reported that his recall had been motivated by a recent breakdown in Australia–France relations, particularly over the future of New Caledonia. On 5 January France had suspended ministerial contacts with Australia because of their support for efforts at the United Nations to have New Caledonia put back on the United Nations list of non-self-governing territories (it had been removed from the list in 1947) and added to the Decolonisation List, which were successful in a resolution of the UN General Assembly of 2 December 1986. France's actions to expel Dauth and its reasoning for doing so were also criticised by the governments of Fiji, Papua New Guinea and Vanuatu's Prime Minister, Walter Lini, who noted that "the French Government's reaction after its defeat on the United Nations vote ... could be said to be undiplomatic, childish, naive and reactionary".

=== French Polynesia ===
From 1990 to 2021, there existed an Honorary Consulate in Papeete, French Polynesia, held from 2002 to 2021 by Marc Siu, who reported to the consulate-general in Nouméa. In May 2021, Australian Foreign Minister Marise Payne announced the establishment of an Australian Consulate-General in French Polynesia, upgrading the Australian representation there as part of an expansion of the country's diplomatic presence in the Pacific region that included appointing official representation to every member of the Pacific Islands Forum. Claire Scott was appointed on the same day as the new consul-general.

== Office-holders ==
Official Representative	Start of term	End of term	Notes
Bertram Ballard	6 August 1940	28 March 1944	
Noël Deschamps	28 March 1944	December 1945	
Consul	Start of term	End of term	Notes
Harold Stuart Barnett	18 December 1945	25 March 1950	
Lawrence John Lawrey (Acting)	25 March 1950	1 November 1950	
Harold David Anderson	1 November 1950	March 1953	
H. E. Holland (Vice Consul)	March 1953	30 November 1953	
John Stanley Cumpston	30 November 1953	January 1958	
Pierre Hutton	January 1958	21 May 1958	
Rodney B. Hodgson	21 May 1958	5 October 1960	
Keith Douglas Scott	5 October 1960	4 January 1963	
Ivor Gordon Bowden	4 January 1963	24 June 1965	
Ian E. Nicolson	24 June 1965	29 December 196	
Anthony Wilson	29 December 1967	29 July 1968	
David Wilson	29 July 1968	16 November 1970	
Alan Edwards	16 November 1970	13 October 1972	
Robin Casson	13 October 1972	20 December 1975	
Bill Fisher	20 December 1975	10 February 1978	
Mike Ovington	10 February 1978	20 February 1980	
Consul-General	Start of term	End of term	Notes
Malcolm Leader	20 February 1980	18 March 1983	
Stuart Hume	18 March 1983	18 May 1986	
John Dauth	18 May 1986	11 January 1987	
Malcolm Leader (Acting)	11 January 1987	5 July 1987	
David O'Leary	5 July 1987	11 February 1990	
Richard A. Rowe	11 February 1990	3 September 1992	
Leslie Rowe	3 September 1992	14 August 1995	
Graeme Wilson	14 August 1995	6 October 1998	
Sally Mansfield	6 October 1998	6 October 2001	
Denise Fisher	6 October 2001	3 December 2004	
Jane Urquhart	3 December 2004	6 December 2007	
Anita Butler	6 December 2007	5 December 2011	
Heidi Bootle	5 December 2011	25 July 2015	
Paul Wilson	25 July 2015	20 August 2019	
Alison Carrington	20 August 2019	9 November 2021	
Steven Barraclough (Acting)	9 November 2021	6 July 2022	
Annelise Young	6 July 2022	present	

=== Consuls-general in Papeete, French Polynesia ===
Name	Start of term	End of term	Notes
Mario Borg (Honorary Consul)	9 April 1990	20 February 1992	
Bryan Banston (Honorary Consul)	20 February 1992	30 November 1994	
Malcolm Andrews (Honorary Consul)	30 November 1994	1997	
Nicholas McGlynn (Honorary Consul)	1997	1999	
Lennart Johansson (Honorary Consul)	1999	2002	
Marc Siu (Honorary Consul)	2002	4 May 2021	
Claire Scott	4 May 2021	present	

== See also ==
- Australia–France relations
- Foreign relations of New Caledonia
