= Foreign relations of Tonga =

Tonga, by a modification of its treaty of friendship with the United Kingdom in July 1970, is responsible for its own external affairs. It maintains cordial relations with most countries and has close relations with its Pacific neighbours and the United Kingdom.

== Diplomatic relations ==
List of countries with which Tonga maintains diplomatic relations:

#	Country	Date
1	New Zealand	4 June 1970
2	United Kingdom	4 June 1970
3	Japan	July 1970
4	South Korea	11 September 1970
5	Australia	3 December 1970
6	India	23 December 1970
7	Canada	11 June 1971
8	France	16 July 1971
9	Belgium	16 August 1971
10	United States	6 November 1972
11	Sweden	21 January 1974
12	Russia	2 October 1975
13	Netherlands	4 November 1975
14	Turkey	26 January 1976
15	Luxembourg	1 November 1976
16	Israel	June 1977
17	Germany	2 January 1978
18	Libya	16 March 1978
19	Chile	1 October 1979
20	Spain	16 November 1979
21	Solomon Islands	7 July 1980
22	Vanuatu	30 July 1980
23	Fiji	1980
24	Philippines	1 July 1981
25	Italy	26 November 1981
26	Papua New Guinea	August 1982
27	Malaysia	9 September 1982
28	Sri Lanka	10 January 1984
29	Peru	20 January 1984
30	Greece	5 July 1985
31	Switzerland	13 September 1985
32	Denmark	31 October 1985
33	Norway	30 August 1988
34	Federated States of Micronesia	1 August 1989
35	Maldives	1 August 1989
36	Brunei	1 May 1990
37	Singapore	6 August 1993
38	Finland	1 December 1993
39	Thailand	27 January 1994
40	Indonesia	30 May 1994
–	Holy See	24 August 1994
41	Morocco	16 January 1995
42	Slovenia	7 December 1995
43	China	2 November 1998
44	Zimbabwe	February 1999
45	South Africa	1 September 1999
46	Mongolia	4 April 2001
47	Seychelles	12 July 2002
48	Cuba	15 July 2002
49	Timor-Leste	26 November 2002
50	Eswatini	22 May 2003
51	Malta	3 May 2007
52	Venezuela	9 May 2007
53	United Arab Emirates	13 July 2007
54	Czech Republic	19 September 2007
55	Iceland	14 December 2007
56	Mexico	26 September 2008
57	Portugal	26 November 2008
58	Cyprus	22 June 2009
59	Hungary	23 September 2011
60	Brazil	21 December 2011
–	Cook Islands	18 November 2014
61	Georgia	18 February 2015
62	Estonia	12 March 2015
63	Kazakhstan	17 March 2015
64	Poland	29 August 2016
65	Latvia	28 October 2020
66	Saudi Arabia	14 December 2020
67	Ireland	27 July 2021
68	Kuwait	2 September 2021
69	Bahrain	19 September 2022
70	Marshall Islands	21 September 2022
71	Kyrgyzstan	7 December 2022
72	Bosnia and Herzegovina	9 February 2023
73	Tajikistan	10 February 2023
74	Rwanda	22 March 2023
75	Romania	10 April 2023
76	Vietnam	21 September 2023
77	Austria	16 February 2024
78	Qatar	16 February 2024
79	Nicaragua	28 February 2024
80	Dominican Republic	29 February 2024
81	Nepal	1 March 2024
82	Oman	14 March 2024
83	Uruguay	14 March 2024
84	Uganda	15 April 2024
—	Kosovo	17 April 2024
85	Lithuania	23 September 2024
86	Dominica	25 October 2024
87	San Marino	25 February 2025
88	Serbia	24 September 2026
89	Egypt	Unknown
90	Kiribati	Unknown
91	Nauru	Unknown
92	Pakistan	Unknown
93	Samoa	Unknown
94	Tuvalu	Unknown

== Regional relations ==
Tonga maintains strong regional ties in the Pacific. It is a full member of the Pacific Islands Forum, the South Pacific Applied Geoscience Commission, the South Pacific Tourism Organisation, the Pacific Regional Environment Programme and the Secretariat of the Pacific Community. Tonga endorsed the Treaty of Rarotonga (the South Pacific Nuclear Free Zone Treaty) in 1996.

Tonga is, however, notably not one of the eight signatories of the Nauru Agreement Concerning Cooperation in the Management of Fisheries of Common Interest which collectively controls 25–30% of the world's tuna supply and approximately 60% of the western and central Pacific tuna supply.

Since November 2011, Tonga has been one of the eight founding members of Polynesian Leaders Group, a regional grouping intended to cooperate on a variety of issues including culture and language, education, responses to climate change, and trade and investment.

== Bilateral relations ==
Country	Formal Relations Began	Notes
Australia	3 December 1970	See Australia–Tonga relations: Australia has a high commission in Nukuʻalofa.; Tonga has a high commission in Canberra.
Canada	11 June 1971	Canada is accredited to Tonga from its High Commission in Wellington, New Zealand.; Tonga is accredited to Canada from its Permanent Mission to the United Nations in New York City.
China	2 November 1998	See China–Tonga relations: In 1998, Tonga recognized the People's Republic of China and severed relations with Taiwan.
Fiji	1980	See Fiji–Tonga relations These neighbouring countries in the South Pacific have a history of bilateral relations going back several centuries. Fiji's Prime Minister Voreqe Bainimarama received "cheers and thunderous applause" from the Tongan public when he attended a Pacific Islands Forum meeting in Tonga in October 2007; the crowd's "enthusiastic reception" of Fiji's leader was likened to "that accorded to a rock star". Radio Australia noted that he had been "the star of this year's meeting, for the people of Tonga", while TVNZ reported that he had been "given a hero's welcome". In terms of inter-governmental relations, Tonga has generally avoided pressuring Fiji's "interim government" into holding democratic elections. However, Tongan Prime Minister Dr. Feleti Sevele has urged Bainimarama "to produce a credible roadmap to the election according to the Constitution and law of Fiji".
Germany	2 January 1978	Germany is accredited to Tonga from its embassy in Wellington, New Zealand.
Greece	5 July 1985	Greece is accredited to Tonga from its embassy in Wellington, New Zealand.
India	23 December 1970	See India–Tonga relations
Japan	July 1970	Tonga has an embassy in Tokyo.
Latvia	28 October 2020	Tonga and Latvia established diplomatic relations in 2020. On 28 October 2020, Tongan and Latvian Ambassadors to the United Nations signed a joint communiqué formalising the bilateral relations and expressed satisfaction over strengthening of ties between the two countries.; Both countries see opportunities for cooperation in tackling climate change, development cooperation, economics, and cooperation in various multilateral formats, especially in the light of the prospective Latvian non-permanent membership of the United Nations Security Council in 2026–2027.; In October 2024, the Speaker of the Tongan Parliament Fatafehi Fakafanua expressed support for Latvia's nomination to join the United Nations Security Council in June 2025.
Mexico	26 September 2008	Mexico is accredited to Tonga from its embassy in Wellington, New Zealand.; Tonga is accredited to Mexico from its Permanent Mission to the United Nations in New York City.
New Zealand	4 June 1970	See New Zealand–Tonga relations: New Zealand has a high commission in Nukuʻalofa.; Tonga has a consulate-general in Auckland.
Russia	2 October 1975	See Russia–Tonga relations The Kingdom of Tonga and the Soviet Union established formal diplomatic relations in 1976. Tonga was the first Pacific Island country to establish relations with the USSR. The USSR was dissolved in 1991 and was succeeded by Russia as the successor state. On 2 October 2005, Minister of Foreign Affairs of the Russian Federation Sergey Lavrov and Minister of Foreign Affairs of the Kingdom of Tonga ST T. Tupou exchanged telegrams offering congratulations on the occasion of 30th anniversary of establishing diplomatic relations between the two nations. In his heads of foreign ministries of Russia and Tonga expressed confidence in further development of Russian-Tongan relations in the interests of the peoples of both countries and strengthen peace and security in the Asia-Pacific region.
Samoa		See Samoa–Tonga relations
South Korea	11 September 1970	The ROK's Investment in Tonga in 2019 was about 2.5 million $.
Turkey	26 January 1976	See Tonga–Turkey relations: Turkish ambassador in Wellington to New Zealand is also accredited to Tonga.; Trade volume between the two countries was negligible in 2019.
United Kingdom	4 June 1970	See Tonga–United Kingdom relations Tonga established diplomatic relations with the United Kingdom on 4 June 1970.: Tonga maintains a high commission in London.; The United Kingdom is accredited to Tonga through its high commission in Nuku'Alofa.; Both countries share common membership of the Commonwealth, the United Nations, the World Health Organization, and the World Trade Organization. Bilaterally the two countries have an Investment Agreement.
United States	6 November 1972	See Tonga–United States relations The United States and Tonga enjoy close cooperation on a range of international issues. Officers of the American Embassy in Suva, Fiji, are concurrently accredited to Tonga and make periodic visits since the United States has no permanent consular or diplomatic offices in Tonga. Although plans for a US consulate in Tonga were announced in 2008, it has yet to be established. In May 2023, the United States announced plans to establish an embassy in Tonga, as part of a larger regional push to strengthen ties with the Pacific. Peace Corps Volunteers teach and provide technical assistance to Tongans. A large number of Tongans reside in the United States, particularly in Utah, California and Hawaii.: Tonga is accredited to the United States from its permanent mission to the United Nations in New York City and has a consulate-general in Burlingame, California.

== International disputes ==
In 1972, Tonga laid claim to, and invaded, the tide-washed, isolated Minerva Reefs, some 480 kilometres southwest of Nuku'olofa, to thwart efforts by a private group, Ocean Life Research Foundation, to establish an independent Republic of Minerva (now the Principality of Minerva) on the reefs and surrounding quays. In November 2005, Fiji laid a complaint with the International Seabed Authority claiming ownership of the reefs.

== See also ==
- List of diplomatic missions in Tonga
- List of diplomatic missions of Tonga
