= Raymonde Rolly =

New Caledonian resistance member (1917–1988)

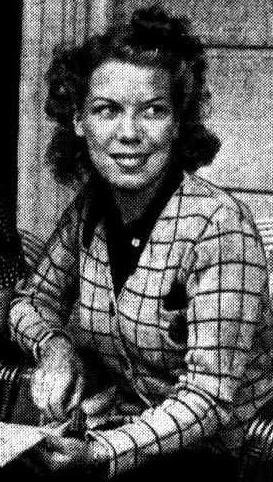
- Raymonde Rolly in 1941
- Born: Raymonde Marthe Andrée Rolly; 17 February 1917; Koné, New Caledonia
- Died: 11 July 1988 (aged 71); Tahiti
- Other names: Raymonde Beer
- Spouse: Herman Beer (m. 1943)

Raymonde Marthe Andrée Rolly (17 February 1917 – 11 July 1988) was a New Caledonian member of the French resistance during World War II.

== Early life ==
Raymonde Marthe Andrée Rolly was born on 17 February 1917 in Koné, New Caledonia, and was the daughter of Héloïse Clavier and Henry Rolly. She began her career as a driver at her father's company in Nouméa, transporting mail and passengers for four years. She also worked as a typist in at an English office in Nouméa.

== Resistance ==
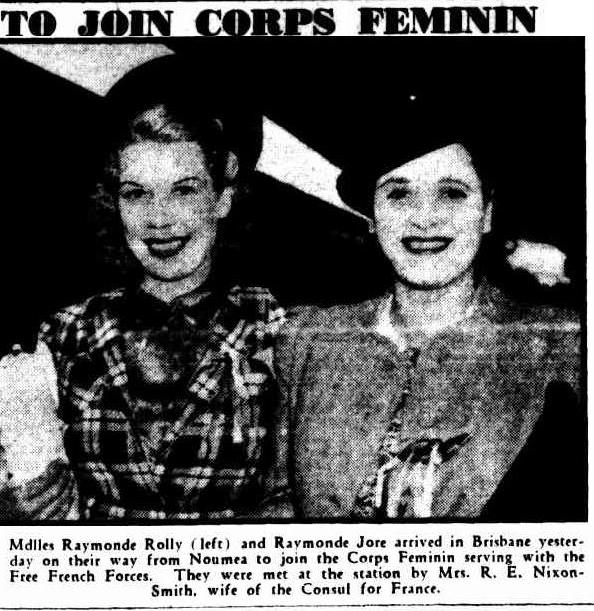
Raymonde Rolly and Raymonde Jore in 1941

In September 1940, Rolly and her friend Raymonde Jore decided to travel overseas to support the Free France movement led by Charles de Gaulle. Rolly then officially enlisted as a volunteer in the Free France forces and was given the registration number 70124. Over 50 other women also enlisted to join the Corps des Volontaires françaises, however due to the dangerous journey, the French forces decided against transporting them. However, the Governor of New Caledonia, Henri Sautot, advocated against this, and argued to de Gaulle that the readiness of the women to enlist deserved to be encouraged. de Gaulle eventually gave his permission for Jore and Rolly, the first two women to register, to make the journey.

Rolly and her friend Raymonde Jore left the archipelago on 14 February 1941 to join the Free France headquarters in London. The first leg of the journey was aboard the cargo ship Suva, which was carrying copra. During the journey, the ship was pursued by a German vessel, which previously managed to sink two ships carrying Caledonian nickel. The Suva eventually managed to evade it by frequently changing course, and landed in Australia after a seventeen-day voyage. Before reaching London, the ship also stopped in New Zealand, at New Plymouth and then Wellington. They also travelled through Panama and Canada before reaching Liverpool on 27 May. A few days later, the two were welcomed by René Pleven, the French National Committee's Minister of Foreign Affairs and former Secretary-General of New Caledonia, André Bayardelle.

After they arrived in London in June 1941, Rolly and Jore both became drivers for General Charles de Gaulle's officers. Rolly met de Gaulle in October. Afterwards, she cried on a friend's shoulder, overwhelmed and elated by the meeting, and confided that de Gaulle was "like a God" to her and that he was taking a special interest in them. She later became de Gaulle's driver.

On 5 February 1942, the French military court in Saigon sentenced Rolly to thirteen to twenty years hard labour for being an accomplice to the "delivery of territory" to a foreign power.

In 1943, twenty months after her arrival in Europe, Rolly was transferred to Nigeria where she held the rank of corporal. On 25 February 1943, she married the Oslo-born doctor Herman Beer in Lagos. Rolly also went to Brazzaville and was stationed in Bangui, Douala and Yaoundé. On 6 November 1944, she travelled to Sète, which was the first time she set foot on French soil.

She reunited with her husband in London on 31 March 1945. She returned to New Caledonia with him aboard the Sagittaire along with other New Caledonian recruits and arrived there on 21 May 1946.

== Later life and death ==
After her return to New Caledonia, Rolly became a teacher and taught at Tiebaghi Primary School, Suzanne Russier School, Faubourg-Blanchot School and the Noumea Technical College. Rolly spent her retirement in Tahiti with her husband. She died there on 11 July 1988, at the age of 71.

== Sources ==
- Defrance, Veronique (2015). Femmes au coeur du conflit - Nouvelle-Calédonie 1939-1945 (in French). Musée de la 2nde Guerre mondiale en Nouvelle-Calédonie. pp. 18–19. ISBN 9782953506969.
