= Dave Sharma =

Australian politician and diplomat (born 1975)

Senator Dave Sharma
- देवानंद शर्मा
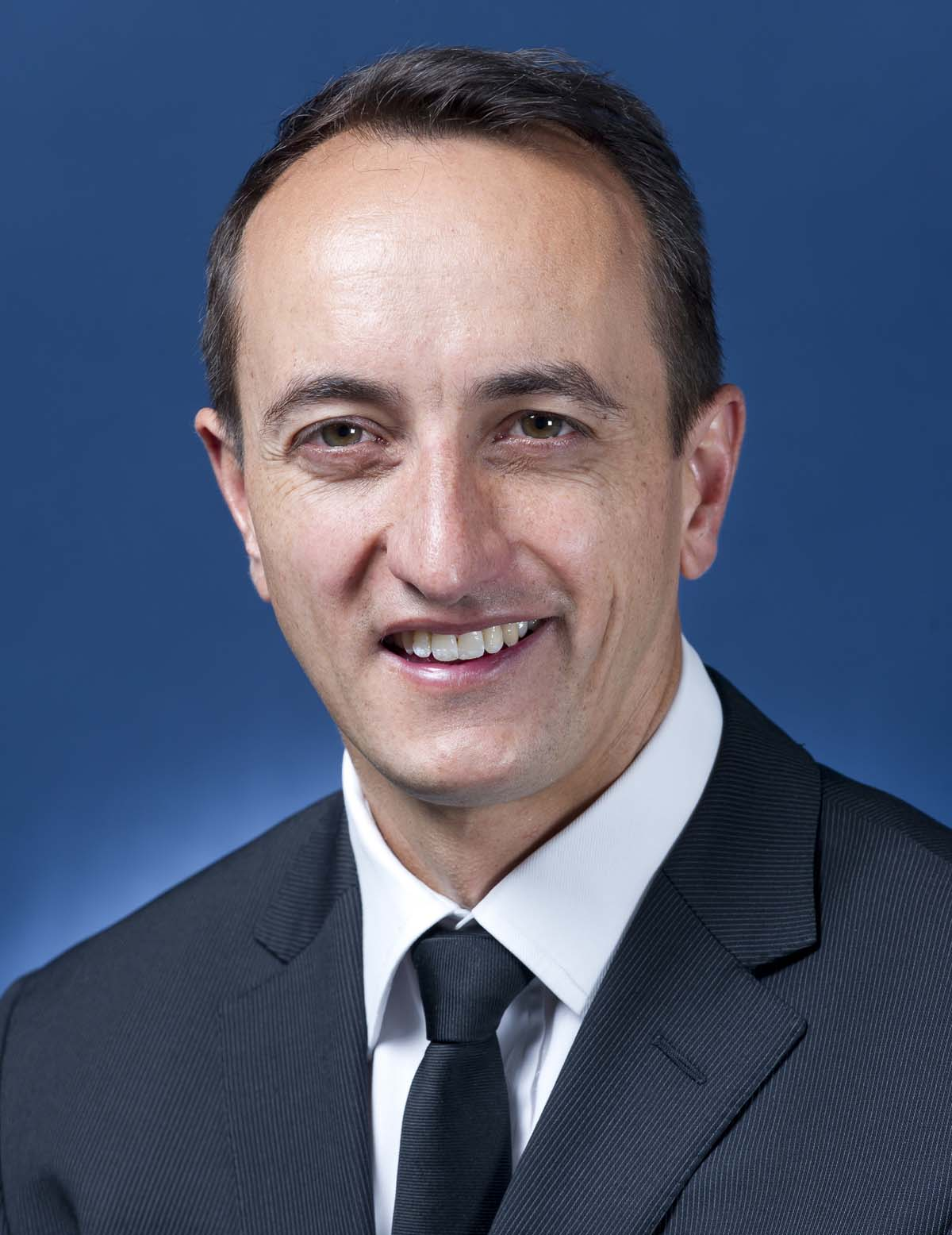
- Official portrait, 2013

Senator for New South Wales
- Incumbent
- Assumed office 30 November 2023
- Preceded by: Marise Payne

Member of the Australian Parliament for Wentworth
- In office 18 May 2019 – 21 May 2022
- Preceded by: Kerryn Phelps
- Succeeded by: Allegra Spender

Ambassador of Australia to Israel
- In office 16 May 2013 – 19 June 2017
- Nominated by: Bob Carr
- Preceded by: Andrea Faulkner
- Succeeded by: Chris Cannan

Personal details
- Born: Devanand Noel Sharma; 1975 (age 50–51) Vancouver, British Columbia, Canada
- Party: Liberal
- Education: University of Cambridge; Deakin University
- Profession: Public servant Diplomat; Politician
- Website: www.davesharma.com.au

Devanand Noel "Dave" Sharma (born 1975) is an Australian politician and former public servant and diplomat who has been Senator for New South Wales since November 2023. Prior to that, he was the member for Wentworth in the House of Representatives from 2019 to 2022, when he lost the seat to independent challenger Allegra Spender. He is a member of the Liberal Party.

He was previously head of the International Division of the Department of the Prime Minister and Cabinet (2010–2012) and as Ambassador to Israel (2013–2017). His appointment to the latter post, at the age of 37, made him one of Australia's youngest ambassadors and the second Australian ambassador of Indian heritage.

== Early life and education ==
Devanand Noel "Dave" Sharma was born in Vancouver, British Columbia, Canada, in 1975. His father is a Trinidadian of Indian heritage and his mother was from Sydney, and he was named after Bollywood star Dev Anand. His family moved to Turramurra in Sydney, in 1979. Sharma's mother died of breast cancer when he was 12, and he was raised by his father.

Sharma attended secondary school at Turramurra High School in Sydney. He matriculated in 1993 with the highest possible Tertiary Entrance Rank of 100.

Sharma studied a Bachelor of Arts at Cambridge University between 1994 and 1997. He initially studied natural sciences but transferred to law in 1995 (his second year) and graduated in law with first-class honours. He then returned to Sydney and studied medicine at Sydney Medical School at the University of Sydney. Following a year of studying medicine, he began working as a public servant for the Department of Foreign Affairs and Trade and completed a master's degree in international relations through Deakin University.

Sharma was one of seven Liberal MPs in the 46th Parliament of Australia who had obtained degrees at an Oxbridge or Ivy League university, the others being Alan Tudge, Angus Taylor, Andrew Laming, Josh Frydenberg, Greg Hunt, and Paul Fletcher.

== Career ==
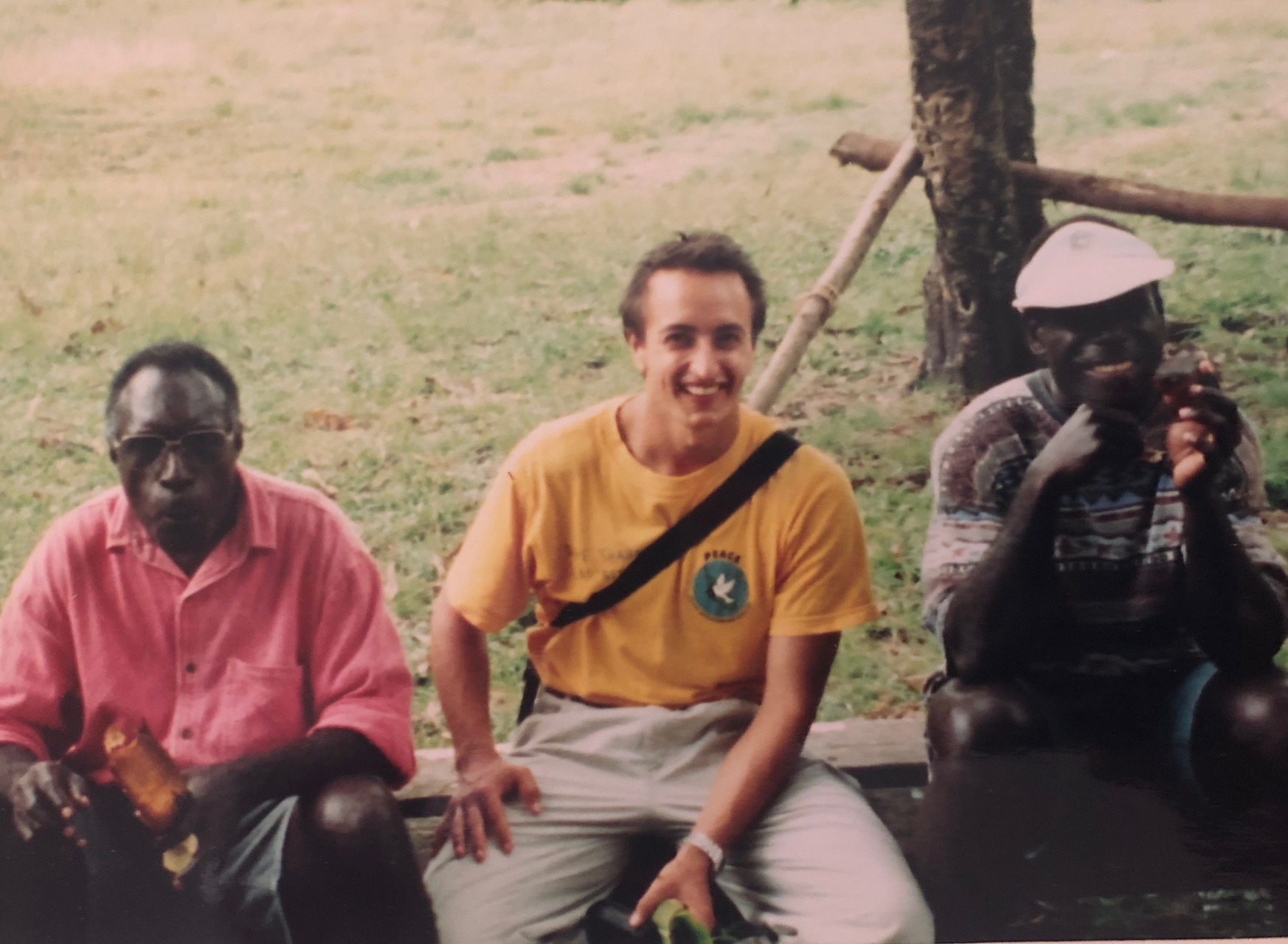
Sharma on peacekeeping duties in Bougainville

=== Public sector ===
Sharma began working for the Department of Foreign Affairs and Trade in 1999 and held posts both in Australia and overseas. From 2004 to 2006 he served as the legal adviser to Foreign Affairs Minister Alexander Downer and was then appointed to the Australian Embassy in Washington from 2006 until 2009.

Sharma held appointments at the Australian High Commission to Papua New Guinea in Port Moresby, and as a senior civilian adviser with the Peace Monitoring Group on Bougainville.

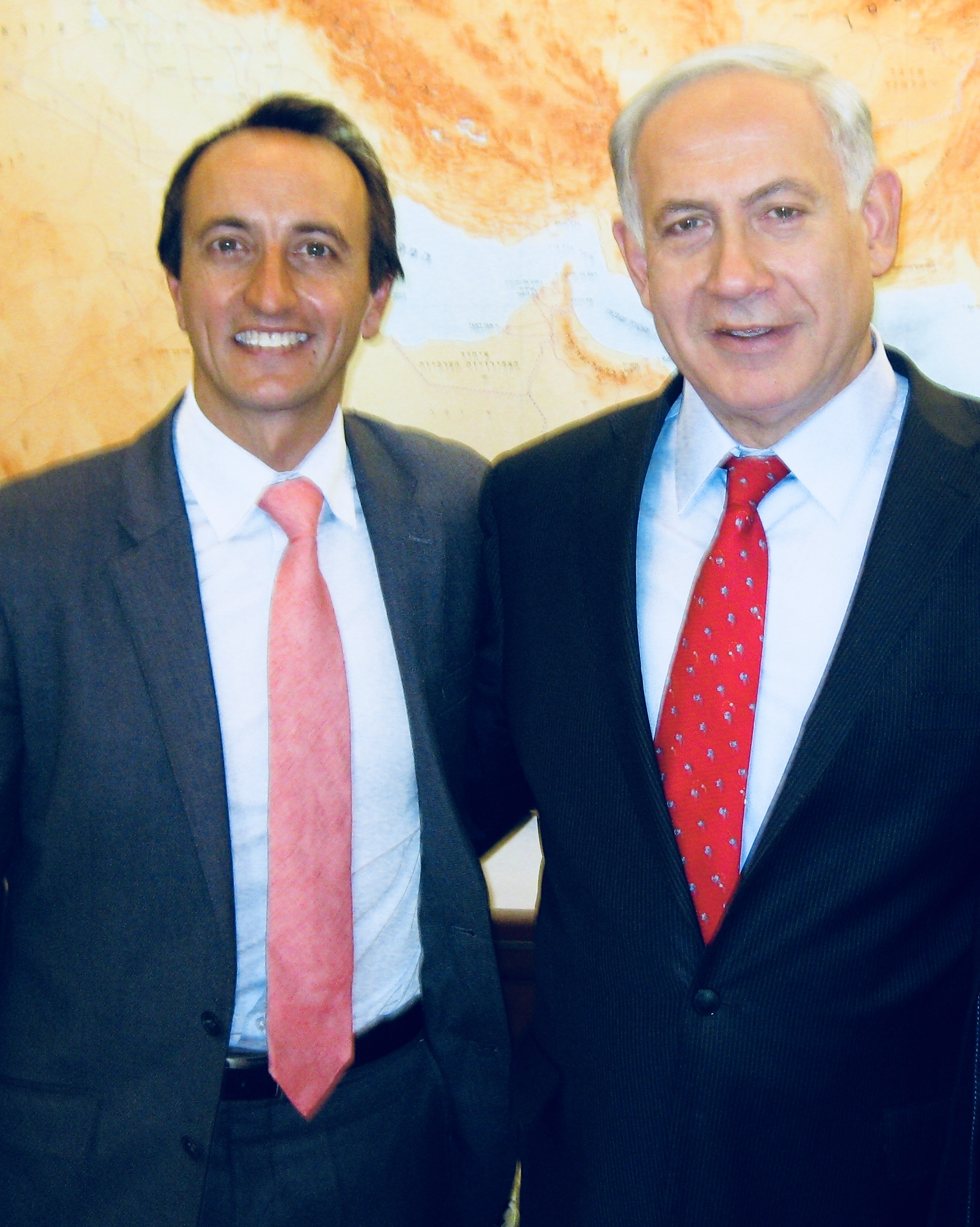
Sharma with Israeli Prime Minister Netanyahu

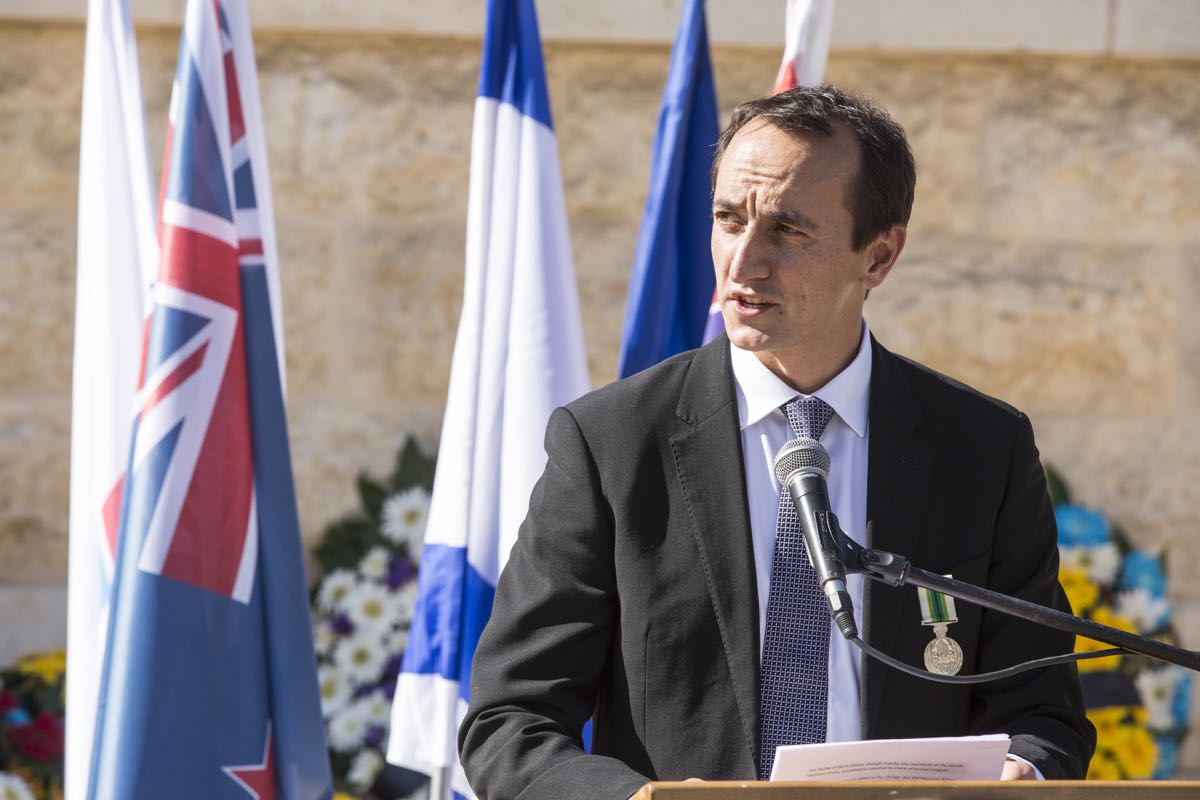
Sharma appearing at Mount Scopus as the Ambassador of Australia to Israel

From 2010 to 2012 Sharma was the head of the International Division in the Department of the Prime Minister and Cabinet. He advised the Prime Minister Julia Gillard during G-20 summits (including as the Prime Minister's sous-sherpa) and East Asia summits and was involved in international diplomatic events which occurred in Australia including the Commonwealth Heads of Government Meeting in October 2011 and during US President Barack Obama's visit to Australia in November 2011.

Sharma served as the Assistant Secretary, responsible for the Department of Foreign Affairs and Trade's Africa Branch between 2012 and 2013. In November 2012, Sharma led a visit to Abuja, Nigeria and participated in talks with the Nigerian Ministry of Foreign Affairs and National Security Adviser as well as with officials from the Economic Community of West African States.

Sharma was appointed the ambassador to Israel by the Minister for Foreign Affairs, Bob Carr, on 16 May 2013 replacing Andrea Faulkner. Sharma presented his credentials to Israeli President Shimon Peres on 8 August 2013.

While in Israel, Sharma and his wife Rachel visited casualties of the Syrian civil war in the Ziv Medical Center in Zefat. This visit made him the first international representative to visit casualties of the war.

In May 2014, Sharma caused a diplomatic incident by meeting with the Israeli Housing and Construction Minister, Uri Ariel, in Israeli government offices located in occupied East Jerusalem, resulting in a formal complaint from the chief Palestinian UN negotiator to Julie Bishop, the then Australian Minister for Foreign Affairs, that the meeting may be deemed as "aiding and abetting … illegal Israeli policies". Australia rejected these complaints, saying the meeting did not alter its position regarding the status of Jerusalem and the need to resolve this through direct negotiations.

In April 2017, Julie Bishop announced that Chris Cannan would succeed Sharma as Ambassador to Israel in mid-2017. Cannan began his appointment as ambassador on 19 June 2017.

=== Private sector ===
As of 2018 Sharma was chairman of Shekel Brainweigh Ltd, an Israeli technology company. He was reported to be helping a number of other Israeli technology companies to enter the Australian market.

=== Federal politics ===
==== 2018 Wentworth by-election ====
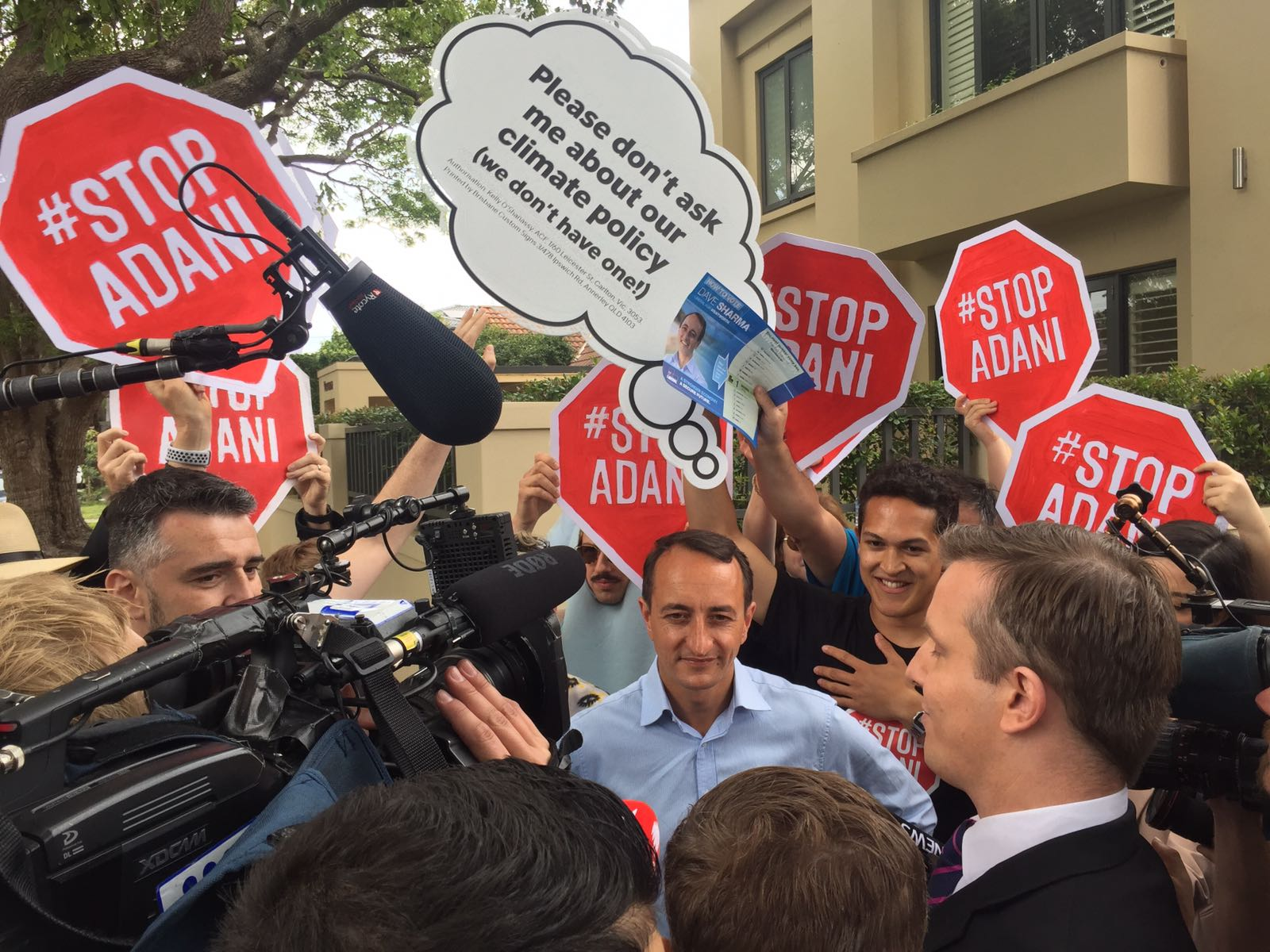
Sharma holding a press conference during the 2018 Wentworth by-election, surrounded by Stop Adani protesters

Following the August 2018 resignation of former prime minister Malcolm Turnbull, Sharma was selected as the Liberal Party candidate for the resulting Wentworth by-election, defeating Prime Minister Scott Morrison's preferred candidate.

Sharma contested the Wentworth by-election against a field of 15 other candidates with independent candidate Kerryn Phelps, a former City of Sydney Councillor and AMA President, widely regarded as Sharma's most serious competitor.

Phelps would go on to win the Wentworth by-election with 51.22% of the TCP vote, defeating Sharma after favourable preference flows.

==== 2019 election ====
Sharma was again pre-selected to run as the Liberal candidate for Wentworth at the 2019 Australian federal election, and was successful in winning the seat from Phelps with 51.31% of the TCP vote.

Sharma is a member of the Moderate/Modern Liberal faction of the Liberal Party.

On 10 February 2020, Sharma moved a bipartisan motion in the House of Representatives with Labor MP Josh Burns calling for the immediate extradition of alleged pedophile Malka Leifer from Israel, having developed an interest in the case during his term as Australia's ambassador to Israel. Australia had first issued an extradition request in 2014 after Leifer had fled to Israel in 2008 following allegations that she had raped and abused students while serving as Principal of the orthodox Adass Israel School. Leifer's legal representatives argued that she was medically unfit to travel thereby delaying the extradition process for many years however in September 2020 the Supreme Court of Israel ruled that Leifer was fit to stand trial. Leifer was extradited to Australia on 25 January 2021.

On 26 October 2021, Prime Minister Morrison announced that the Australian Government would commit to a net-zero emissions target by 2050, effectively ending a decade long political impasse on the issue. In the months leading up to this announcement, Sharma made several media appearances making the case for Australia to adopt a net-zero target. Sharma was named in media reports as one of several moderates within the Liberal Party agitating for the Government to commit to a such target by 2050.

Although he didn't want to be the casting vote, Sharma crossed the floor on 10 February 2022 to vote to include protection for transgender students in the government's modifications to the Sex Discrimination Act after three other Liberal MPs had already committed to rebelling, guaranteeing the amendment's success.

==== 2022 election ====
At the 2022 federal election Sharma faced an independent challenge from businesswoman Allegra Spender, who is part of a noteworthy family of politicians, and part of a broader movement of teal independents during this election. During the campaign Sharma dropped the Liberal party logo from his advertising and changed the colour scheme for some of his material from the traditional Liberal blue to teal, the colour being used by his opponent. Sharma lost the 2022 election to independent candidate Allegra Spender. Spender won decisively with 54% of the two-party preferred vote.

==== 2023 Senate pre-selection ====
Sharma was selected by the Liberal Party to fill the vacancy in the Senate caused by the resignation of Marise Payne. He was one of ten candidates to nominate for the position, beating out the likes of former Australian Capital Territory senator Zed Seselja and former New South Wales state minister for transport Andrew Constance, both of whom were endorsed by party leader Peter Dutton. He was appointed to the Senate in a joint sitting of the New South Wales parliament on 30 November 2023.

== Political positions ==
=== Climate change ===
Sharma advocates for Australia to do more to mitigate global climate change. He said the Liberal–National Coalition should have attempted to persuade Donald Trump to have the United States rejoin the Paris Agreement and that it should push other countries to meet their targets under the agreement. In 2020, he opposed a government plan that would have provided federal funding to coal power plants. Sharma opposed electric car mandates that he felt were too totalitarian or communist.

=== Military spending ===
Sharma said Australia needs to invest more in its military. He argues the influence the US historically used to secure international peace is fading. He wants Australia to increase the 2% of GDP it spends on its military. The Financial Review described Sharma as a "realist" who believes in the inevitability of human conflict and the self-interested behaviour of nations.

=== Global diplomacy ===
Sharma also wants Australia to secure more positions within UN agencies, as he says China and others have already done. He said COVID-19 travel bans were an excessive burden on personal liberties, and has argued for reform of the World Health Organization. Sharma wrote a paper for the Australian Strategic Policy Institute encouraging the Department of Foreign Affairs and Trade to invest more in online diplomacy programs, saying their social media activity was largely canned posts.

Sharma encourages Australia to engage in "political warfare," such as disinformation campaigns, voting interference, and gathering military intelligence, in countries that pose a threat to Australia. He used Israel's covert intelligence organisation as an example, although he opposes the assassinations Israel's covert operations are known for. He argues this form of statecraft is necessary due to similar efforts by other countries to interfere with Australia's elections and to spread propaganda in Australia. Sharma started advocating for these tactics after the US started targeting Russian politicians with negative campaigns in response to Russian interference in the 2016 United States elections.

=== Israel–Palestine conflict ===
Sharma has advocated for the demilitarisation of the Gaza Strip, but said conflict is unlikely to end until Hamas stops firing rockets over the border. Sharma supports gay marriage and has said the Religious Discrimination Bill cannot be at the expense of gay rights. In 2019, Sharma said an accused paedophile, Malka Leifer, was making fraudulent claims of mental health issues in the Israeli court system to delay extradition to Australia, and criticised Israel for its leniency. Sharma was involved in motions attempting to get her extradited to Australia.

== Personal life ==
Sharma and his wife Rachel have three daughters.

In January 2020, former Labor MP Melissa Parke sued Sharma for defamation over an April 2019 tweet in which he accused her of anti-semitism and "trafficking in conspiracy theories". He made the comment after she had withdrawn from the 2019 federal election when her comments about Israel and Palestine were publicised. In October 2020, the Federal Court dismissed Parke's defamation action against Sharma but ruled that Sharma's earlier settlement offer should take effect, where each party would have to pay their own costs. Following this, Sharma reiterated his comment on Parke, and stated that it was "a victory for free speech".

Diplomatic posts
Preceded by Andrea Faulkner	Australian Ambassador to Israel; 2013–2017	Succeeded by Chris Cannan
Parliament of Australia
Preceded by Kerryn Phelps	Member for Wentworth; 2019–2022	Succeeded by Allegra Spender
Preceded by Marise Payne	Senator for New South Wales; 2023–present	Incumbent
