= Foreign relations of New Caledonia =

As a semi-autonomous overseas department of France, France is responsible for New Caledonia's defence, foreign relations, law and order, monetary policy and tertiary education. Under the framework of the Nouméa Accord, New Caledonia and France share responsibility for managing the territory's regional relations, allowing New Caledonia to join some regional and international organisations. New Caledonia is a member of the Pacific Islands Forum, the South Pacific Regional Environment Programme (SPREP), the Pacific Community (PC) and the South Pacific Tourism Organisation (SPTO). New Caledonia is also an associate member of La Francophonie and is a non-voting member of the World Health Organization's Western Pacific Regional Committee.

== History ==
New Caledonia is a French overseas territory in the southwest Pacific. It has a population of about 270,000; with the indigenous Kanak people constituting, according to the 2019 census, 41% of the population, the Europeans (Caldoche and metropolitan French) 28%, those of mixed race 11%, with other ethnic minorities (including Wallisians, Tahitians, Polynesians Ni-Vanuatu, Indonesians, Vietnamese and Chinese) constituting the remainder. New Caledonia became a French overseas territory in 1946 and has representatives in both houses of the French Parliament, while the President of France serves as the territory's head of state. France maintains jurisdiction over New Caledonia's justice system, defense, and internal security.

In 1988, following widespread political violence between Caldoches and indigenous Kanaks — a period referred to as "the Events" (French: Les Événements) — the Matignon Agreements were signed, establishing a transition to its current large autonomy as a sui generis collectivity within the French state. This was followed in 1998 by the Nouméa Accord. As part of the Accord, New Caledonia was allowed to hold three referendums to decide on the future status of the territory, with voting rights restricted to indigenous Kanak and other inhabitants living in New Caledonia before 1998. The Nouméa Accord also established the groundwork for a 20-year transition that gradually transferred competences to the local government.

Following the timeline set by the Nouméa Accord which stated a vote must take place by the end of 2018, the groundwork was laid for a referendum on full independence from France at a meeting chaired by the French Prime Minister Édouard Philippe on 2 November 2017, to be held by November 2018. The first referendum was held on 4 November 2018, with 56.7 percent of voters choosing to remain part of France. The second referendum was held in October 2020, with 53.4 percent of voters choosing to remain a part of France. The third referendum was held on 12 December 2021. The referendum was boycotted by pro-independence forces, who argued for a delayed vote due to the impact caused by the COVID-19 pandemic; when the French government declined to do so, they called for a boycott. This led to 96% of voters choosing to stay with France.

In May 2024, rioting broke out over a proposed French electoral reform legislation to extend voting rights to long-term residents who had resided in New Caledonia for at least ten years. In October 2024, then-French Prime Minister Michel Barnier scrapped the bill, citing the need to restore calm and telling the French National Assembly that "avoiding further unrest" was a priority. On 2 December 2024, curfew was officially lifted as the riots were over.

== Bilateral relations ==
In 2002, New Caledonia entered into a cooperation agreement with Vanuatu. Since 2019, New Caledonia has appointed official representatives who are embedded at the French Embassies in Australia, Fiji, New Zealand, Papua New Guinea and Vanuatu. These officials represent New Caledonia's interest in these five countries.

Australia, Indonesia, New Zealand and Vanuatu maintain consulate-generals in Nouméa. In December 2021, Japan announced plans to open a consulate office in Nouméa.

== International organisations participation ==
Since 2016, New Caledonia has been a full member of the Pacific Islands Forum. New Caledonia is also a member of the Pacific Community, the South Pacific Regional Environment Programme (SPREP) and the South Pacific Tourism Organisation (SPTO).

New Caledonia is also an associate member of La Francophonie and is a non-voting member of the World Health Organization's Western Pacific Regional Committee.

The Kanak and Socialist National Liberation Front (FLNKS), a pro-independence political party, is a member of the Melanesian Spearhead Group.
