= Tonga–United Kingdom relations =

- Tonga: United Kingdom

Diplomatic mission
- High Commission of Tonga, London: High Commission of the United Kingdom, Nuku'Alofa

Tonga–United Kingdom relations are the foreign and bilateral relations between the Kingdom of Tonga and the United Kingdom of Great Britain and Northern Ireland. Tonga was a British protectorate from 1900 until 1970, when Tonga achieved full independence. Both countries established post-independence diplomatic relations on 10 June 1970.

Both countries share common membership of the Commonwealth, the United Nations, the World Health Organization, and the World Trade Organization. Bilaterally the two countries have an Investment Agreement.

== History ==
British explorer James Cook led expeditions to Tonga in 1773, 1774 and 1777. This was followed by extensive English missionary activity beginning in 1797. The mass conversion of most Tongans to Christianity – and primarily to Wesleyan Methodism – resulted in strong religious ties to England as the source of most of the missionaries involved. Indeed, it was in part through the assistance of the English missionary Shirley Baker (who baptized him) that George Tupou I established the monarchy of Tonga in 1875. This served to further strengthen Anglo-Tongan ties, and the United Kingdom and the Kingdom of Tonga established formal mutual diplomatic recognition in 1879. While always remaining independent, Tonga became a British protected state under the so-called Treaty of Friendship on 18 May 1900, when European settlers and rival Tongan chiefs tried to oust the second king. The Treaty of Friendship and protected state status ended only in 1970 under arrangements established during the reign of Tonga's third monarch, Queen Sālote.

Tonga is unique among Pacific island nations in its never having been colonized. Its foreign relations, therefore, have always been as an independent monarchy free of the colonial relationships of its neighbors.

In the 1950s, Anglo-Tongan relations were strengthened with the visit of each country's monarch to the other nation. In 1953, Tonga's Queen Sālote became the first Tongan monarch to visit Britain when she attended the coronation of Elizabeth II. Soon after, in 1954, the Queen Elizabeth then visited Tonga.

The Treaty of Friendship and protected state status ended only in 1970 under arrangements established during the reign of Tonga's third monarch, Queen Sālote.

As part of cost-cutting measures across the British Foreign Service, the British Government closed the British High Commission in Nukuʻalofa in March 2006, transferring representation of British interests in Tonga to the UK High Commissioner in Fiji. The last resident British High Commissioner was Paul Nessling.

In 2010, Tongan Brigadier General Tau'aika 'Uta'atu, Commander of the Tonga Defence Services, signed an agreement in London committing a minimum of 200 Tongan troops to cooperate with Britain's International Security Assistance Force (ISAF) in Afghanistan.

== Economic relations ==
Tonga is eligible to accede to the Pacific States–United Kingdom Economic Partnership Agreement, a free trade agreement with the United Kingdom; Tonga has shown interest in acceding to the EPA.

Following the withdrawal of the United Kingdom from the European Union, the UK and Pacific States signed the Pacific States–United Kingdom Economic Partnership Agreement on 14 March 2019. The Pacific States–United Kingdom Economic Partnership Agreement is a continuity trade agreement, based on the EU free trade agreement, which entered into force on 1 January 2021. Trade value between the Pacific States and the United Kingdom was worth £286 million in 2022.

== Diplomatic missions ==
- Tonga maintains a high commission in London.
- The United Kingdom is accredited to Tonga through its high commission in Nuku'Alofa.

== See also ==
- Foreign relations of Tonga
- Foreign relations of the United Kingdom
