= Henry Showers =

- Born: 31 May 1899; Carlton, Victoria, Australia
- Died: 31 July 1991 (aged 92); Darlinghurst, New South Wales, Australia
- Military career
- Allegiance: Australia
- Branch: Royal Australian Navy
- Service years: 1913–1955
- Rank: Rear Admiral
- Commands: HMAS Shropshire (1944; 1946); HMAS Hobart (D63) (1942–1943); HMAS Adelaide (1918) (1939–1942); HMAS Swan (U74) (1939)
- Awards: Commander of the Order of the British Empire
- Other work: President of the Navy League of Australia (1957–1968)

Henry Arthur Showers CBE (24 May 1899 – 31 July 1991) was a senior officer in the Royal Australian Navy (RAN). He commanded several vessels during World War II and retired with the rank of rear admiral.

== Early life ==
Showers was born on 24 May 1899 in Carlton, Victoria. He was one of four surviving children born to Alice Mary (née Villar) and Charles Showers. His father was a hotelier.

== Naval career ==
In 1913, Showers was part of the inaugural intake into the newly established Royal Australian Naval College in Geelong, with the rank of cadet midshipman. During World War I he was seconded to the Royal Navy and served with HMS Glorious at the Second Battle of Heligoland Bight in 1917. He then joined the submarine service aboard HMS K22, completing further training as a submariner and returned to Australia on HMAS J3. He remained with the Australian submarine service until its disbandment in 1922.

Showers later trained as a navigator and then returned to the Royal Navy from 1923 to 1925 to train on minesweepers. He subsequently served as an assistant surveyor on HMAS Moresby during its survey of the Great Barrier Reef. He was promoted commander in 1933 and undertook further service with the Royal Navy before returning to Australia in 1936.

Showers' first command was the sloop HMAS Swan which he commanded from January to August 1939. He took commanded of the light cruiser HMAS Adelaide in September 1939 and was promoted captain in December 1939. He notably commanded Adelaide on its mission to New Caledonia in September 1940 to install Free French governor Henri Sautot. He later commanded HMAS Hobart from June 1942 until it was torpedoed by the Japanese submarine I-11 in July 1943 and badly damaged. His final command of World War II was HMAS Shropshire from May 1944 to September 1944. During this time Shropshire was "heavily employed on naval gunfire support duties for amphibious landings on the north coast of New Guinea, and also at Wakde Island and Morotai in the Netherlands East Indies".

In 1944, Showers was promoted commodore and appointed to the Commonwealth Naval Board as second naval member. He was "responsible for all personnel matters (both permanent and reserves members), discipline, naval stores, victualling and medical services". He was the first graduate of the Royal Australian Naval College to be appointed to the board. Showers was promoted to acting rear admiral on 10 May 1950 and transferred to the Retired List with the honorary rank of rear admiral on 8 February 1955.

== Personal life and honours ==
In 1927, Showers married Jean Alison Cunningham, with whom he had a daughter. Outside of the navy he played rugby union at a high level and refereed for the New South Wales Rugby Union.

Showers was appointed Commander of the Order of the British Empire (CBE) in the 1945 Birthday Honours, for "meritorious service, outstanding leadership and devotion to duty".

After his retirement Showers served as president of the Navy League of Australia from 1957 to 1968. He was also secretary of the Nuclear Research Foundation supporting the University of Sydney School of Physics from 1955 to 1968. He died on 31 July 1991 in Darlinghurst, New South Wales, aged 92.
