= List of ambassadors of Australia to Israel =

Ambassador of Australia to Israel

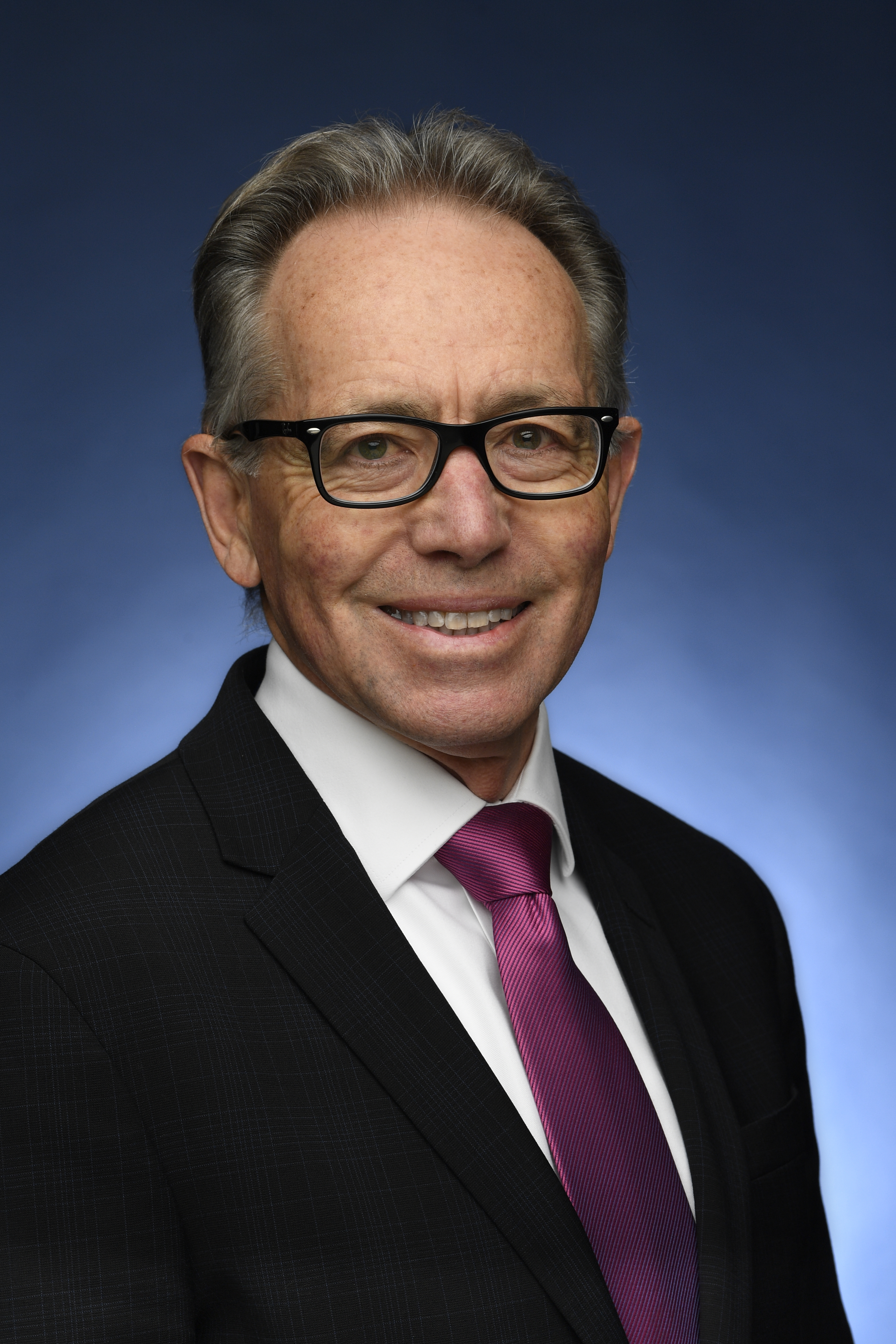
- Incumbent; Neil Hawkins since 21 May 2026
- Department of Foreign Affairs and Trade
- Style: His Excellency
- Reports to: Minister for Foreign Affairs
- Nominator: Prime Minister of Australia
- Appointer: Governor-General of Australia
- Inaugural holder: Osmond Charles Fuhrman
- Formation: 28 October 1949
- Website: Australian Embassy, Israel

The ambassador of Australia to Israel is an officer of the Australian Department of Foreign Affairs and Trade and the head of the Embassy of the Commonwealth of Australia to the State of Israel. The ambassador is an officer of the Australian Department of Foreign Affairs and Trade and the head of the Embassy of the Commonwealth of Australia to the State of Israel in Tel Aviv. The position has the rank and status of an ambassador extraordinary and plenipotentiary. The current ambassador, since 8th February 2026, is Neil Hawkins.

Israel and Australia have enjoyed official diplomatic relations since the Australian government of Ben Chifley recognised Israel on 28 January 1949. The first Australian representative was Osmond Charles Fuhrman who was appointed as the Envoy Extraordinary and Minister Plenipotentiary to the Australian legation in Tel Aviv in October 1949. Orsmond presented his credentials to President Chaim Weizmann on 4 January 1950. In October 1960 the legations of Israel in Canberra and of Australia in Tel Aviv were raised to embassy status and the Australian Minister John McMillan became the first ambassador.

== List of heads of mission ==
Ordinal	Officeholder	Title	Term start date	Term end date	Time in office	Notes
1	Osmond Charles Fuhrman OBE	Minister to Israel	28 October 1949	March 1955	5 years, 4 months	
2	Bertram Ballard	Minister to Israel	July 1955	February 1960	4 years, 7 months	
3	John McMillan	Minister to Israel	March 1960	14 October 1960	3 years, 1 month	
3	John McMillan	Ambassador of Australia to the State of Israel	14 October 1960	April 1963	3 years, 1 month	
4	John Hood CBE	Ambassador of Australia to the State of Israel	April 1963	September 1964	1 year, 5 months	
5	William Landale	Ambassador of Australia to the State of Israel	January 1965	March 1970	5 years, 2 months	
6	Marshall Johnston	Ambassador of Australia to the State of Israel	March 1970	September 1972	2 years, 6 months	
7	Rawdon Dalrymple	Ambassador of Australia to the State of Israel	September 1972	June 1975	2 years, 9 months	
8	Richard Smith	Ambassador of Australia to the State of Israel	June 1975	November 1977	2 years, 5 months	
9	Walter Handmer	Ambassador of Australia to the State of Israel	November 1977	July 1980	2 years, 8 months	
10	David Goss	Ambassador of Australia to the State of Israel	July 1980	December 1983	3 years, 5 months	
11	Robert Merrillees	Ambassador of Australia to the State of Israel	December 1983	1987	3–4 years	
12	John Campbell	Ambassador of Australia to the State of Israel	1987	July 1990	2–3 years	
13	William Fisher	Ambassador of Australia to the State of Israel	July 1990	July 1993	3 years	
14	Peter William Rodgers	Ambassador of Australia to the State of Israel	January 1994	May 1997	3 years, 4 months	
15	Ian Wilcock	Ambassador of Australia to the State of Israel	May 1997	February 2000	2 years, 9 months	
16	Richard Rigby	Ambassador of Australia to the State of Israel	February 2000	July 2001	1 year, 5 months	
17	Ross Burns	Ambassador of Australia to the State of Israel	July 2001	September 2003	2 years, 2 months	
18	Tim George	Ambassador of Australia to the State of Israel	September 2003	September 2006	3 years	
19	James Larsen	Ambassador of Australia to the State of Israel	September 2006	March 2010	3 years, 6 months	
20	Andrea Faulkner	Ambassador of Australia to the State of Israel	March 2010	June 2013	3 years, 3 months	
21	Dave Sharma	Ambassador of Australia to the State of Israel	June 2013	19 June 2017	4 years	
22	Chris Cannan	Ambassador of Australia to the State of Israel	19 June 2017	September 2020	3 years, 2 months	
23	Paul Griffiths	Ambassador of Australia to the State of Israel	October 2020	May 2026	5 years, 7 months	
24	Neil Hawkins	Ambassador of Australia to the State of Israel	May 2026	incumbent	5 months	

== See also ==
- Australia–Israel relations
- Foreign relations of Australia
