= Raymonde Jore =

New Caledonian resistance member and nurse

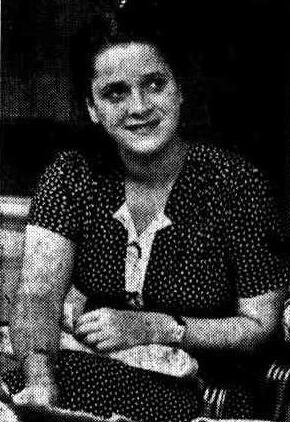
- Raymonde Jore in 1941
- Born: 26 July 1917; Nouméa, New Caledonia
- Died: 20 February 1995 (aged 77); Nouméa, New Caledonia
- Other names: Raymonde Teyssier-Jore
- Spouse: Marcel Teyssier (m. 1945)

Raymonde Jore (26 July 1917 – 20 February 1995) was a New Caledonian nurse and member of the French Resistance during World War II.

== Early life ==
Raymonde Jore was born on 26 July 1917 in Nouméa and was the daughter of Alice Estieux and Henri Jore. She received training at a military hospital in Nouméa, and also worked as a secretary at a French government office.

== Resistance ==
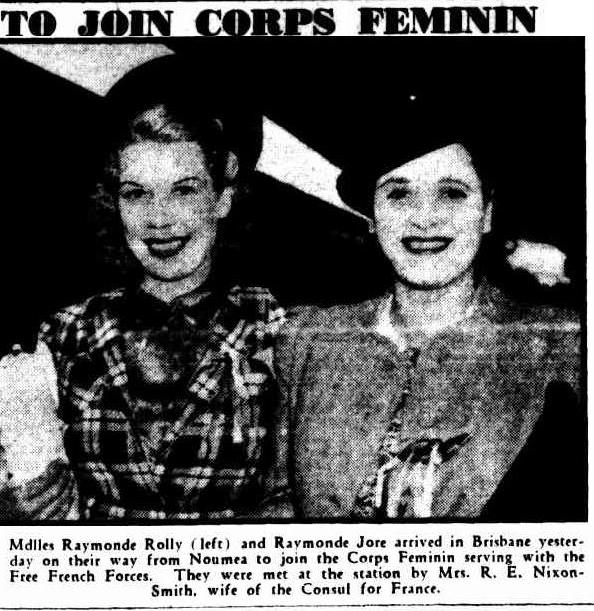
Raymonde Rolly and Raymonde Jore in 1941

In September 1940, Jore and her friend Raymonde Rolly decided to travel overseas to support the Free France movement led by Charles de Gaulle. Jore officially enlisted as a volunteer in the Free France forces on 21 September 1940, and had the registration number 70125. Over 50 other women also enlisted to join the Corps des Volontaires françaises, however due to the dangerous journey, the French forces decided against transporting them. However, the Governor of New Caledonia, Henri Sautot, advocated against this, and argued to de Gaulle that the readiness of the women to enlist deserved to be encouraged. de Gaulle eventually gave his permission for Jore and Rolly, the first two women to register, to make the journey. When Jore was told by Sautot that she was accepted, she broke protocol and threw herself into his arms and kissed him.

Jore and Rolly left the archipelago on 14 February 1941 for the Free France headquarters in London. The first leg of the journey was aboard the cargo ship Suva, which was carrying copra. During the journey, the ship was pursued by a German vessel, which previously managed to sink two ships carrying Caledonian nickel. The Suva eventually managed to evade it by frequently changing course, and landed in Australia after a seventeen-day voyage. Before reaching London, the ship also stopped in New Zealand, at New Plymouth and then Wellington. They also travelled through Panama and Canada before reaching Liverpool on 27 May. A few days later, the two were welcomed by René Pleven, the French National Committee's Minister of Foreign Affairs and former Secretary-General of New Caledonia, André Bayardelle.

After her arrival in London in June 1941, Jore was housed at Moncorvo House barracks. Both Jore and Rolly both became drivers for Charles de Gaulle's officers. At the end of 1941, Jore and Rolly were the subject of a mock interrogation by two officers to find out if they were virgins. On 1 July 1942, Jore was promoted to corporal and began work as a stenographer for de Gaulle's private staff.

On 5 February 1942, the French military court in Saigon sentenced Jore to thirteen to twenty years hard labour for being an accomplice to the "delivery of territory" to a foreign power.

However, due to her poor health, Jore was transferred to Brazzaville, away from the cold winter. However, she was accused of having an affair with a married man with three children and causing his divorce. As a result, she was expelled from the city, and was moved to Bangui, where she was reunited with Henri Sautot, who had now become the Governor of Ubangi-Shari. Afterwards, Jore was transferred to Yaoundé, where she finally received the assignment she desired as a hospital nurse. However, she was soon called to Algiers where she was seconded as a lieutenant to the Consultative Assembly on 12 August 1944. While in Algiers, she married the soldier Marcel Teyssier at the town hall on 15 April 1945. She returned to New Caledonia with him aboard the Sagittaire along with other New Caledonian recruits and arrived there on 21 May 1946.

== Later life and death ==
After the war, Jore and her husband settled in the New Hebrides and Sydney. From 1975 to 1977, they lived in Paris, before returning to Nouméa on 15 December 1977. Jore died there on 20 February 1995, at the age of 77.

== Sources ==
- Defrance, Veronique (2015). Femmes au coeur du conflit - Nouvelle-Calédonie 1939-1945 (in French). Musée de la 2nde Guerre mondiale en Nouvelle-Calédonie. ISBN 9782953506969.
