= Jore =

Jore may refer to:

== People ==
- Léonce Jore (1882–1975), French colonial administrator
- Raymonde Jore (1917–1995), New Caledonian nurse and resistance member
- Rick Jore (born 1956), American politician and businessman
- Jore Trompet (born 1992), Belgian football player

== Places ==
- Jore Pokhri Wildlife Sanctuary, India

== Other ==
- Jore (film), 2004 Indian Tamil-language action comedy film
