= Soviet Union–Tonga relations =

Soviet Union-Tonga relations
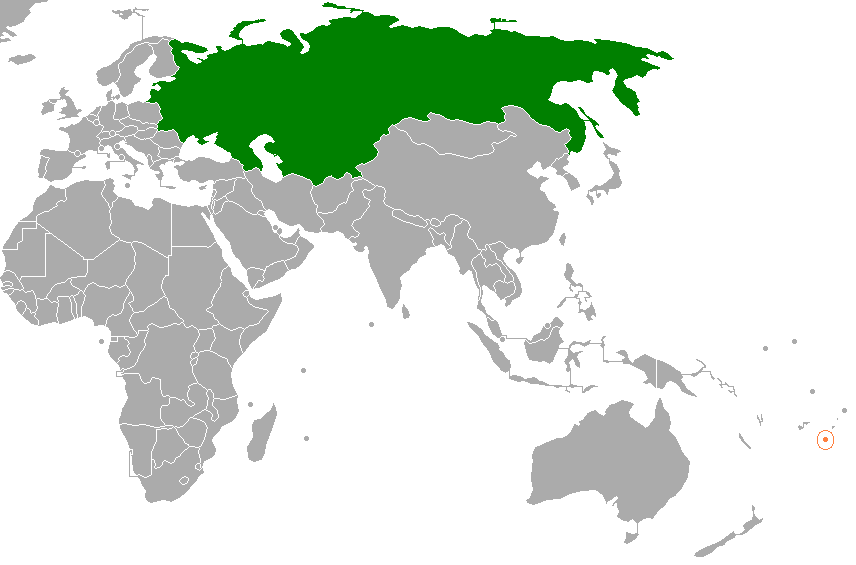

- Soviet Union: Tonga

Tonga and the Soviet Union established formal diplomatic relations in April 1976. Tonga was the first Pacific Island country to establish relations with the USSR.

== Overview ==
Tongan-Soviet relations may be viewed in the context of the two countries' interests. In the mid-1970s, the entirety of Oceania was firmly aligned with the Western Bloc in the context of the Cold War, and the Soviet Union, despite its eastern coast being on the Pacific Ocean, was excluded from participation in regional matters. Tonga, meanwhile, had recently regained full sovereignty after being a protectorate of the United Kingdom and was establishing its own foreign policy. Aligning itself with the West, Tonga sought development aid from its Western partners.

In May 1976, the Soviet Union offered aid to Tonga to build an international airport and develop the fishing and canning industry in exchange for basing rights for its fishing vessels. Tonga's move to establish relations with the USSR caused alarm in New Zealand, the United Kingdom, and West Germany and resulted in several offers of aid from western countries, including West Germany.

The Australian government thereupon announced that it would finance an upgrade of Tonga's international airport and, in 1977, increased its overall economic aid to Tonga (from A$406,000 to over A$1,000,000), before opening a High Commission in Nukuʻalofa in 1980.

In 1987, Tonga "played the Soviet card" again (in the words of E. Huffer), when the then crown prince Sia'osi Taufa'ahau Manumata'ogo Tuku'aho Tupou paid a state visit to the Soviet Union, and declared while in Moscow that "Tonga and the Soviet Union are linked, not separated, by the Pacific Ocean", adding that "the USSR [is] a Pacific nation with legitimate interests in the region".

Relations between Moscow and Nukuʻalofa remained pragmatic rather than ideological. Tonga was, at the time, a quasi-absolute monarchy, with no ideological sympathy for communism.

== See also ==
- Russia-Tonga relations
