= Tonga–Turkey relations =

- Tonga: Turkey

Tonga and Turkey established diplomatic relations on 26 January 1976.

== History ==
In 2008, Turkey hosted a meeting of Pacific Islands Foreign Affairs Ministers in Istanbul which brought together officials from the Pacific Island countries and Turkey for the first time in an international setting. Although most participating countries attended the meeting at a ministerial level, Tonga sent an undersecretary.

In 2014, a meeting of the foreign ministers of Turkey and the Pacific Island countries was held in Istanbul. Representing Tonga, UN Permanent Representative Ambassador Mahe Uliuli Sandhurst Tupouniua attended the meeting. The same year, Turkey made a contribution of US$50,000 to assist Tonga with relief operations following the destruction caused by Cyclone Ian.

In 2017, the state-owned Turkish Cooperation and Coordination Agency stated in their annual report that they assisted Tonga with US$20,000.

== Diplomatic representation ==
The Turkish ambassador in New Zealand's capital city of Wellington is also accredited to Tonga.

== See also ==
- Foreign relations of Tonga
- Foreign relations of Turkey
