= Osmond Charles Fuhrman =

Australian public servant and diplomat

Osmond Charles William Fuhrman OBE
- Born: Otto Carl Wilhelm Fuhrmann; 29 July 1889; Richmond, Victoria, Australia
- Died: 10 November 1961 (aged 72); Devon, England
- Occupations: Public servant, diplomat
- Spouse: Mildred Flora Mackay (m. 1917)

Osmond Charles William Fuhrman OBE (19 July 1889 – 10 November 1961) was an Australian public servant and diplomat.

In November 1949 Fuhrman was appointed the first Australian Minister to Israel. He presented his credentials in Tel Aviv in January 1950.

Diplomatic posts
New title Position established	Australian Minister to Israel; 1949–1955	Succeeded by Bertram Ballard
