= Andrea Faulkner =

Australian diplomat

Andrea Faulkner, until April 2022, was Australian Ambassador to Myanmar until Australia downgraded its diplomatic ties with Myanmar in response to the actions of the military junta in Myanmar. Angela Corcoran was named chargé d’affaires but was not expected to present her credentials as she was considered head of mission in the absence of an ambassador and not the official head of a diplomatic mission., Faulkner also served as Ambassador to Israel from March 2010 until June 2013. It was her post as an ambassador. Until that post, she was Assistant Secretary of the Africa branch at DFAT and was second in command at the embassy in Vietnam.

Before being the ambassador to Myanmar, she was the assistant director of DFAT's Sustainability and Climate Change Branch.

== Education ==
Faulkner attended the University of Adelaide where she earned a BA (with honours), and a bachelor of Music and Diploma in Education.

Diplomatic posts
Preceded by James Larsen	Australian Ambassador to Israel; 2010–2013	Succeeded by Dave Sharma
Parliament of Australia
Preceded by Nicholas Coppel	Ambassador to Myanmar; 2018–2022	Succeeded by Angela Corcoran
