= Noël Deschamps =

Australian public servant and diplomat

- Born: Noël St. Clair Deschamps; 25 December 1908; Brisbane, Queensland
- Died: 12 May 2005 (aged 96); Melbourne
- Education: University of Cambridge
- Occupations: Public servant, diplomat
- Parent: Jacqueline Hester Deschamps

Noël St. Clair Deschamps (25 December 1908 – 12 May 2005) was an Australian public servant and diplomat.

== Early life and education ==
Deschamps was born in Brisbane, the son of Jacqueline Hester née Irwin and Joseph Mark Deschamps. His paternal grandparents owned a vineyard. He was educated at Glamorgan Preparatory School in Toorak, Melbourne. He graduated with a Master of Arts from the University of Cambridge and spent a couple of years as a school-master in North Wales before returning to Australia.

== Diplomatic career ==
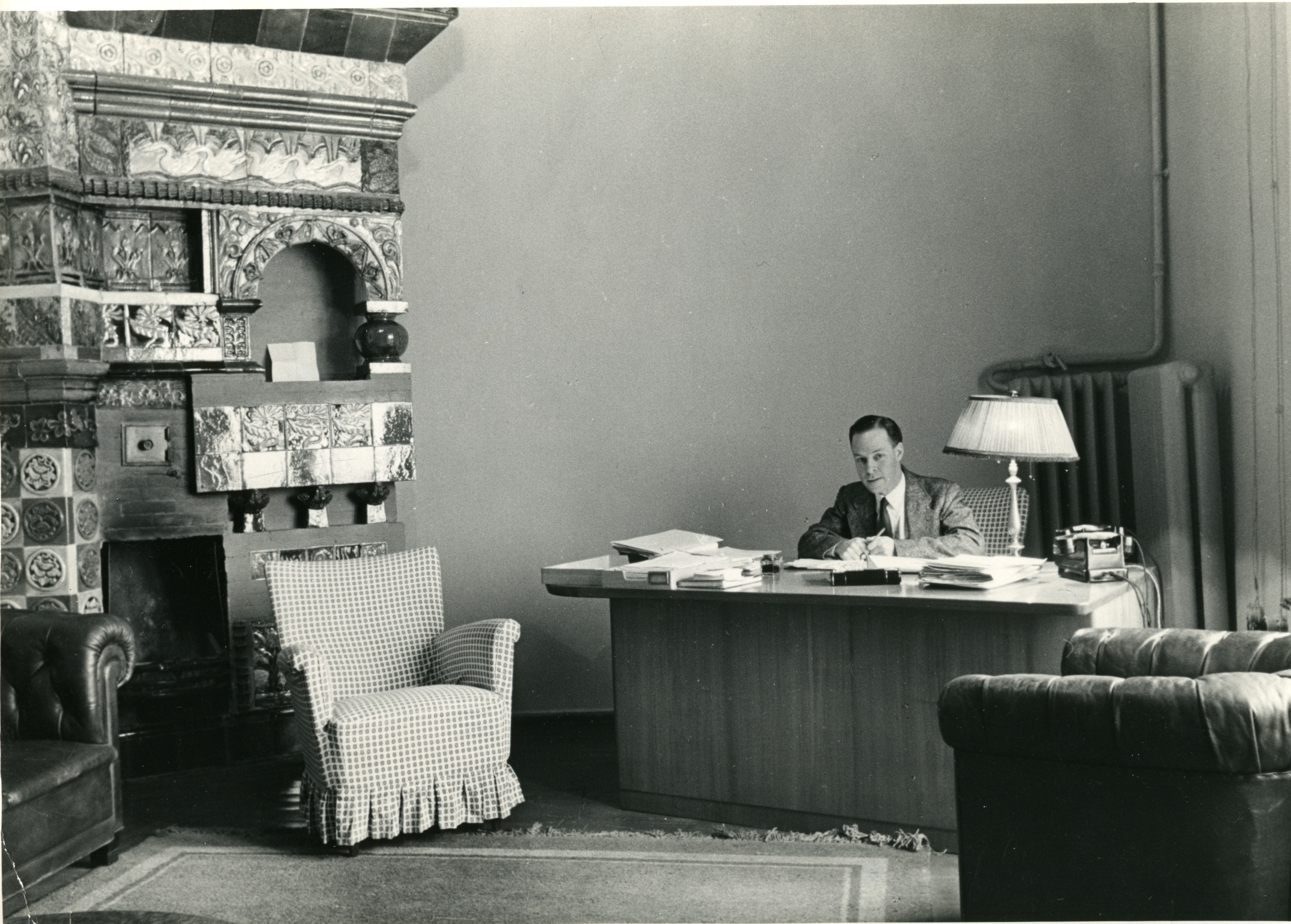
Deschamps in his office as Chargé d'Affaires in Moscow.

Deschamps joined the Department of External Affairs in 1937. January 1940 saw Deschamps appointed official secretary to the Australian High Commissioner in Canada.

Between 1946 and 1947 Deschamps was Charge d'Affaires in Moscow. While in Moscow his sister Yvonne visited.

In March 1950 Deschamps presented his credentials as the head of the Australian Military Mission in Berlin to the three Allied High Commissioners at Bonn. In January 1952, Deschamps was appointed Charge d'Affaires in West Germany to open up the Australian embassy in Bonn.

While Australian Ambassador to Cambodia (1962–1969) Deschamps also represented the interests of the United States in the country after King Norodom Sihanouk broke off diplomatic ties with Washington. Deschamps became a friend of Sihanouk's and the Ambassador was awarded a high Cambodian decoration to mark the close relationship between Australia and Cambodia.

In January 1969 Deschamps was appointed Ambassador to Chile. He presented his credentials to President Eduardo Frei Montalva on 4 June 1969. Deschamps was recalled to Australia for consultations shortly after a coup to remove the Allende Government. He did not return to the country in an official capacity after the coup with the Australian Government instead appointing a charge d'affaires.

Deschamps retired in December 1973 to Melbourne.

== Later life ==
In his retirement, Deschamps was a patron of the Australian Monarchist League.

In May 2005, Deschamps died in Melbourne, aged 96.

Diplomatic posts
| Preceded by Bertram Ballard | Australian Official Representative in Noumea; 1943–1945 | Succeeded by Harold Stuart Barnett as Consul |
| New title Position established | Charge d'Affaires in Bonn; 1952 | Succeeded by John Hood as Ambassador |
| Preceded by Jim Maloney as Minister to the Soviet Union | Charge d'Affaires in Moscow; 1946–1947 | Succeeded by Alan Watt as Minister to the Soviet Union |
| Preceded by W.T. Doig as Chargé d'affaires | Charge d'Affaires in Ireland; 1958–1961 | Succeeded by H.D. White as Chargé d'affaires |
| Preceded by Francis Hamilton Stuart | Australian Ambassador to Cambodia; 1962–1969 | Succeeded by Graham Feakes |
| Preceded by Cavan Hogue as Chargé d'affaires | Australian Ambassador to Chile; 1969–1973 | Succeeded by Ian James as Chargé d'affaires |
