= Tonga–United States relations =

- Tonga: United States

Tonga–United States relations are bilateral relations between Tonga and the United States.

== Tonga–United States Relations: Diplomatic Overview ==
Tonga–United States relations constitute an important bilateral partnership within the broader framework of U.S. engagement in the Pacific. Since the establishment of diplomatic relations in 1972, the two countries have maintained generally cordial relations and have expanded cooperation in diplomatic, security, economic, humanitarian, and environmental affairs.

== History ==
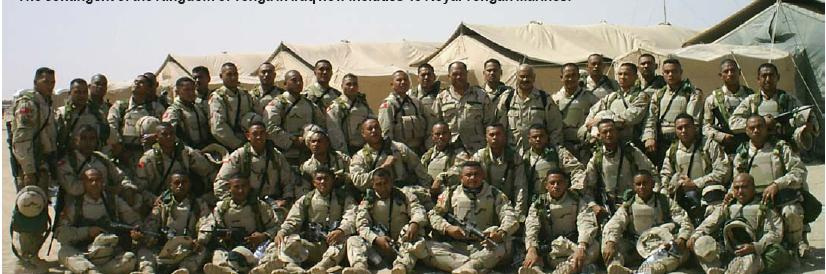
Royal Tongan Marines in Iraq

On July 4, 2007, US Ambassador Larry Dinger noted the "close bilateral military relationship" between the two countries. Tonga was a member of the "Coalition of the Willing", deploying troops from the Tonga Defence Services in Iraq.

The United States has urged Tonga to embrace a "suitably democratic future", but has stated that "Tonga’s issues are for Tonga to resolve". Hence the United States has put little or no pressure on Tonga, its military ally, to become a democracy.

== Economic relations ==
Trade between the U.S. and Tonga is relatively low, but it has seen a steady increase in recent years. In 2001 U.S. exports to Tonga totaled US$4.8 million, and by 2005 they had increased to $10.78 million. In 2005, the U.S. imports from Tonga totaled $6.45 million.

== Diplomatic representation ==
Peace Corps Volunteers are based in Tonga and teach and provide technical assistance to the local population. In 2023, the United States announced plans to open up an embassy in Tonga, as part of a larger regional push to strengthen ties in the Pacific. The embassy was dedicated in July of the same year.

- Tonga is accredited to the United States from its Permanent Mission to the United Nations in New York City and maintains a consulate-general in Burlingame, California.
- United States has an embassy in Nuku’alofa.

== See also ==
- Foreign relations of Tonga
- Foreign relations of the United States
