= Bertram Ballard =

Australian public servant and diplomat

Bertram Ballard AM
- Born: Bertram Charles Ballard; 22 January 1903; Toorak, Victoria, Australia
- Died: 15 July 1981 (aged 78); Kew, Victoria, Australia
- Education: University of Melbourne (BA, LLB, MA)
- Occupations: Public servant, diplomat

Bertram Charles Ballard AM (22 January 1903 – 15 July 1981) was an Australian public servant and diplomat.

== Life and career ==
Ballard was born on 22 January 1903 in Toorak, Melbourne the eldest of three children in his family. He attended Scotch College and then the University of Melbourne, graduating with first-class honours.

Ballard joined the Commonwealth Public Service as Australian government solicitor in New Hebrides, Vanuatu in 1934. On 6 August 1940, Ballard was appointed Australia's first official representative in Nouméa, New Caledonia. He was tasked with encouraging war-time cooperation between New Caledonia and Australia, playing a critical role during the Australian-backed rallying of New Caledonia to Free France, and was also responsible for reporting to the Australian Government on economic and political affairs.

He applied for a job in the Department of External Affairs in 1943. In his first decade at the external affairs department, he was posted to Japan, the Dutch East Indies (now Indonesia), France, the Soviet Union and Switzerland.

In April 1952, Ballard was appointed Australia's first Minister to Thailand. He left for Bangkok that month to take up the posting.

In February 1955, the then External Affairs Minister appointed Ballard Australian Minister to Israel.

Ballard retired in 1967 from his final posting as Australian Ambassador to Sweden (1965–1967).

Ballard was appointed a Member of the Order of Australia in the 1981 Queen's Birthday Honours for "service to the public service as a diplomatic representative".

On 15 July 1981, Ballard died at Kew, Victoria.

Diplomatic posts
New title Position established	Australian Official Representative in Noumea; 1940–1943	Succeeded by Noël Deschamps
New title Position established	Permanent Representative of Australia to the United Nations Office in Geneva; 1949–1951	Succeeded by Patrick Shaw
Preceded by Allan Loomes as Chargé d'affaires	Australian Minister to Thailand; 1952–1955	Succeeded by David Hay
Preceded by Osmond Charles Fuhrman	Australian Minister to Israel; 1955–1960	Succeeded by John McMillan
Preceded by Stewart Wolfe Jamieson	High Commissioner of Australia to Ghana; 1960–1962	Succeeded by Barrie Dexter as Acting High Commissioner
Preceded by Charles Kevin	Australian High Commissioner to Ceylon; 1962–1965	Succeeded by Gordon Upton
Preceded by John Rowland	Australian Ambassador to Sweden; 1965–1967	Succeeded by Roy Peachey
