= List of colonial governors of Ubangi-Shari =

== List of officeholders ==
(Dates in italics indicate de facto continuation of office)

Term	Incumbent	Notes
French Suzerainty
10 February 1894 to 13 July 1894	Eugène Decazes, Director	
Upper Oubangui (Haut-Oubangui)
13 July 1894 to 20 October 1894	Eugène Decazes, Commissioner	
20 October 1894 to 1897	Victor Liotard, Commissioner	
1897 to 1900	Victor Liotard, Lieutenant-Governor	
1900 to 29 December 1903	Adolphe Cureau, Lieutenant-Governor	
Upper Oubangui (Oubangui-Chari)
29 December 1903 to May 1904	Adolphe Cureau, Lieutenant-Governor	(contd.)
May 1904 to 22 August 1905	Alphonse Iaeck, acting Governor-Delegate	
22 August 1905 to 16 February 1906	Victor Emmanuel Merlet, acting Governor-Delegate	
16 February 1906 to 4 April 1906	Louis Paul Émile Lamy, Governor-Delegate	
Oubangui-Chari-Tchad (constituent colony of Congo Français, renamed French Equatorial Africa in 1910)
April 4, 1906, to February 28, 1909	Émile Merwart, Lieutenant-Governor	
February 28, 1909, to August 5, 1910	Lucien Fourneau, acting Lieutenant-Governor	
August 5, 1910, to June 10, 1911	Paul Adam, acting Lieutenant-Governor	
June 10, 1911, to October 12, 1916	Frederic Estebe, Lieutenant-Governor	
October 12, 1916, to July 17, 1917	Victor Merlet, Lieutenant-Governor	
July 17, 1917, to 16 May 1919	Auguste Lamblin, acting Lieutenant-Governor	
May 16, 1919 to August 31, 1920	Auguste Lamblin, Lieutenant-Governor	
Oubangui-Chari (Oubangui-Chari and Chad are separated)
August 31, 1920 to December 1921	Alphonse Diret, acting Lieutenant-Governor	
December 1921 to August 7, 1923	Auguste Lamblin, Lieutenant-Governor	
August 7, 1923 to November 1924	Pierre Frangois, acting Lieutenant-Governor	
November 1924 to July 1, 1926	Auguste Lamblin, Lieutenant-Governor	
July 1, 1926, to July 1928	Georges Prouteaux, acting Lieutenant-Governor	
July 1928 to October 22, 1929	Auguste Lamblin, Lieutenant-Governor	
October 22, 1929, to October 30, 1930	Georges Prouteaux, acting Lieutenant-Governor	
October 30, 1930, to March 8, 1933	Alphonse Deitte, Lieutenant-Governor	
March 8, 1933, to February 1934	Pierre Bonnefont, acting Lieutenant-Governor	
February 1934 to August 17, 1934	Alphonse Deitte, Lieutenant-Governor	
August 17, 1934 to May 21, 1935	Adolphe Deitte, Governor-Delegate	
May 21, 1935, to May 30, 1936	Richard Brunot, Governor-Delegate	
May 30, 1935, to October 24, 1936	Pierre Bonnefont, acting Governor-Delegate	
October 24, 1936, to March 28, 1939	Max Masson de Saint-Félix, Governor-Delegate	
March 28, 1939, to July 15, 1941	Pierre de Saint-Mart, acting Governor	
July 15, 1941 to May 30, 1942	Pierre de Saint-Mart, Governor	
May 30, 1942, to July 30, 1942	André Latrille, acting Governor	
July 30, 1942, to April 3, 1946	Henri Sautot, Governor	
April 3, 1946, to May 24, 1946	Jean Chalvet, Governor	
May 24, 1946, to October 1946	Henri Latour, acting Governor	
French overseas territory
October 1946 to April 25, 1948	Jean Chalvet, Governor	(contd.)
April 25, 1948, to December 1, 1948	Jean Mauberna, acting Governor	
December 1, 1948, to January 27, 1949	Auguste Even, acting Governor	1st Term
January 27, 1949, to January 4, 1950	Pierre Delteil, Governor	
January 4, 1950, to March 1, 1950	Auguste Even, acting Governor	2nd Term
March 1, 1950, to July 9, 1951	Ignace Colombani, Governor	
July 9, 1951, to October 19, 1951	Pierre Raynier, acting Governor	
October 19, 1951, to February 16, 1954	Aime Grimald, Governor	
February 16, 1954, to March 23, 1955	Louis Sanmarco, acting Governor	
March 23, 1957 to January 29, 1958	Louis Sanmarco, Governor	
January 29, 1958, to December 1, 1958	Paul Bordier, Governor	
Central African Republic	autonomous	
December 1, 1958 to August 14, 1960	Paul Bordier, High Commissioner	
August 14, 1960	Independence as Central African Republic	

For continuation after independence, see: List of heads of state of the Central African Republic

== See also ==
- History of the Central African Republic
- Ubangi-Shari
- List of heads of state of the Central African Republic
- List of heads of government of the Central African Republic
- Lists of office-holders
