= List of diplomatic missions of Tonga =

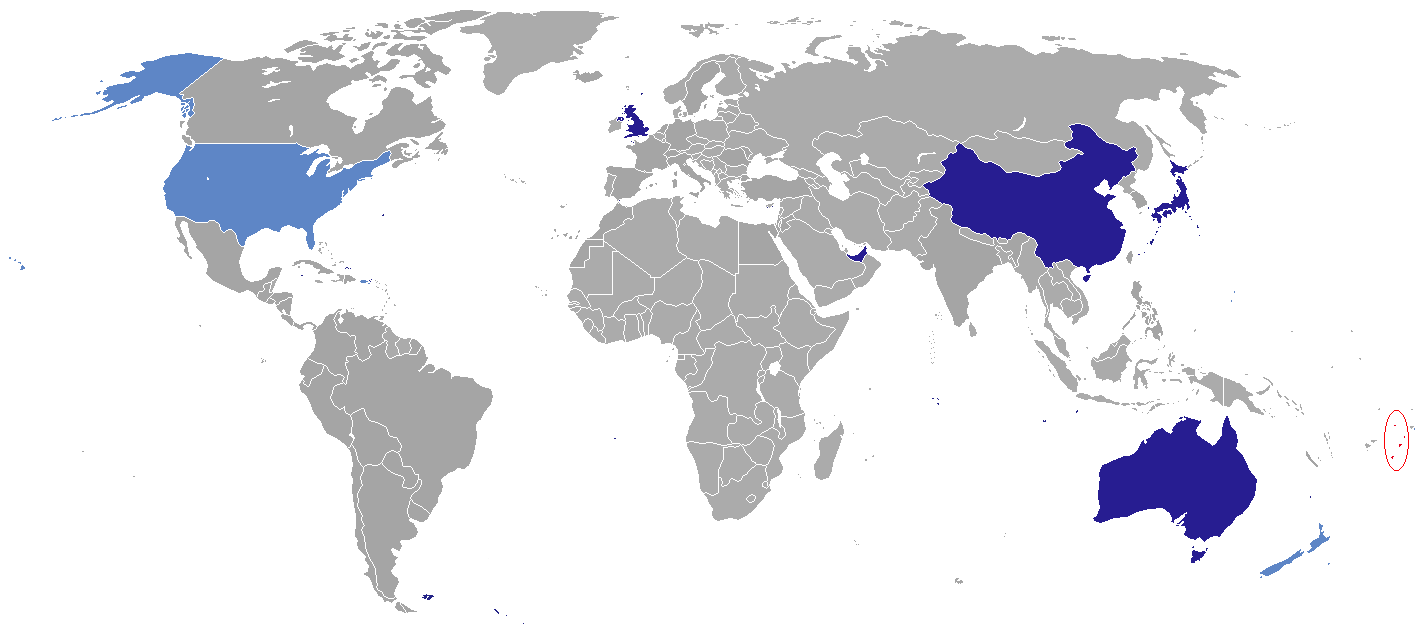
Map of diplomatic missions of Tonga

This is a list of diplomatic missions of Tonga. Tonga is a small island kingdom in Polynesia. About half of its 200,000 citizens live abroad (chiefly in New Zealand, Australia and the United States, and also as merchant seamen), and the portion of its national income derived through expatriate remittances is one of the highest in the world. However, except for a few honorary consulates Tonga's diplomatic network is very limited. It does not even have a mission on any neighbouring Pacific island states.

== Current missions ==
=== Americas ===
| Host country | Host city | Mission | Photo | Concurrent accreditation | Ref. |
|---|---|---|---|---|---|
| United States | Burlingame, California | Consulate-General | | | |

=== Asia ===
| Host country | Host city | Mission | Photo | Concurrent accreditation | Ref. |
|---|---|---|---|---|---|
| China | Beijing | Embassy | | Countries: India; Maldives; Mongolia; Pakistan; Sri Lanka; Vietnam | |
| Japan | Tokyo | Embassy | | Countries: South Korea; Micronesia | |
| United Arab Emirates | Abu Dhabi | Embassy | | Countries: Bahrain; Eswatini; Kazakhstan; Kuwait; Kyrgyzstan; Libya; Morocco; Nepal; Oman; Qatar; Rwanda; Saudi Arabia; Seychelles; South Africa; Tajikistan; Uganda | |

=== Europe ===
| Host country | Host city | Mission | Photo | Concurrent accreditation | Ref. |
|---|---|---|---|---|---|
| United Kingdom | London | High Commission | | Countries: Austria; Belgium; Bosnia and Herzegovina; Cyprus; Czech Republic; Denmark; Estonia; Finland; France; Georgia; Germany; Greece; Holy See; Hungary; Iceland; Ireland; Israel; Italy; Kosovo; Latvia; Luxembourg; Malta; Netherlands; Norway; Poland; Portugal; Romania; Russia; Serbia; Slovenia; Spain; Sweden; Switzerland | |

=== Oceania ===
| Host country | Host city | Mission | Photo | Concurrent accreditation | Ref. |
|---|---|---|---|---|---|
| Australia | Canberra | High Commission | | Countries: Brunei; East Timor; Indonesia; Malaysia; New Zealand; Papua New Guinea; Philippines; Singapore; Solomon Islands; Thailand; Turkey | |
| New Zealand | Auckland | Consulate-General | | | |

=== Multilateral Organizations ===
| Host country | Host city | Mission | Photo | Concurrent accreditation | Ref. |
|---|---|---|---|---|---|
| United Nations | New York City | Permanent Mission | | Countries: Brazil; Canada; Chile; Cuba; Dominican Republic; Mexico; Nicaragua; Peru; United States; Uruguay; Venezuela | |

== See also ==
- Foreign relations of Tonga
- List of diplomatic missions in Tonga
