= List of diplomatic missions in Tonga =

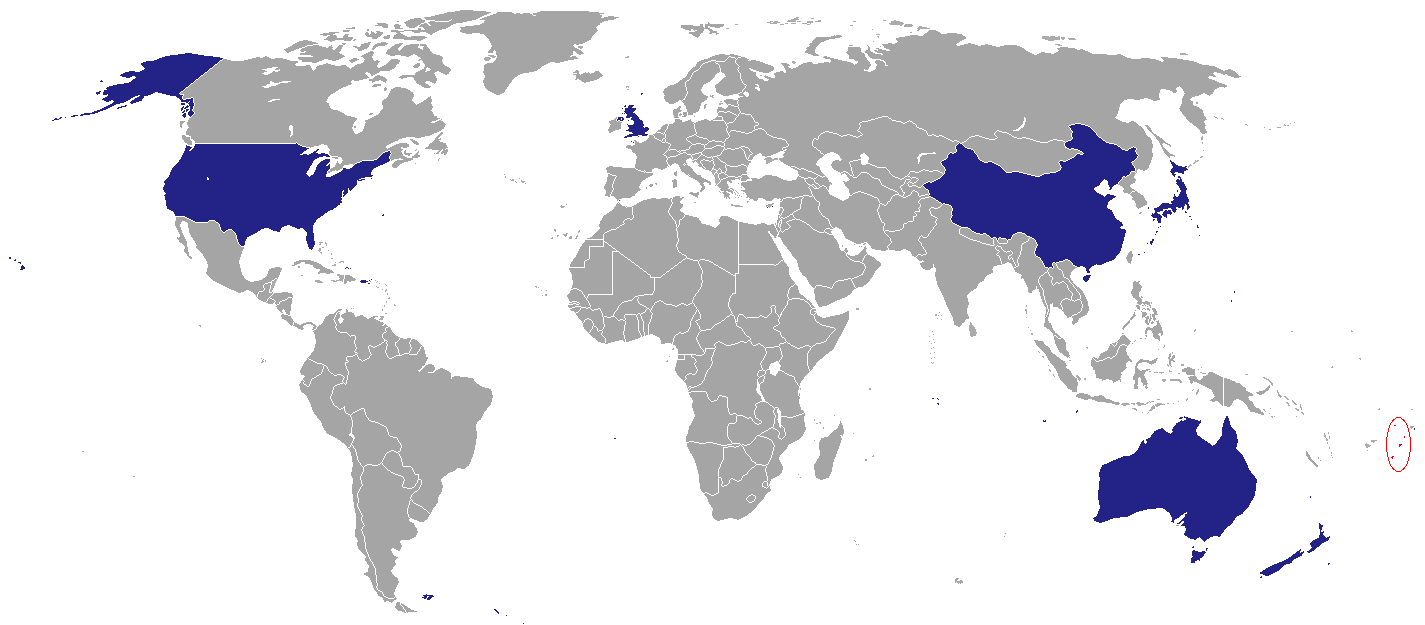
Map of diplomatic missions in Tonga

This is a list of diplomatic missions in Tonga. There are currently 6 diplomatic missions in Nukuʻalofa, (not including honorary consulates).

== Embassies/High Commissions in Nuku’alofa ==
1. Australia
2. China
3. Japan
4. New Zealand
5. United Kingdom
6. United States

== Gallery ==
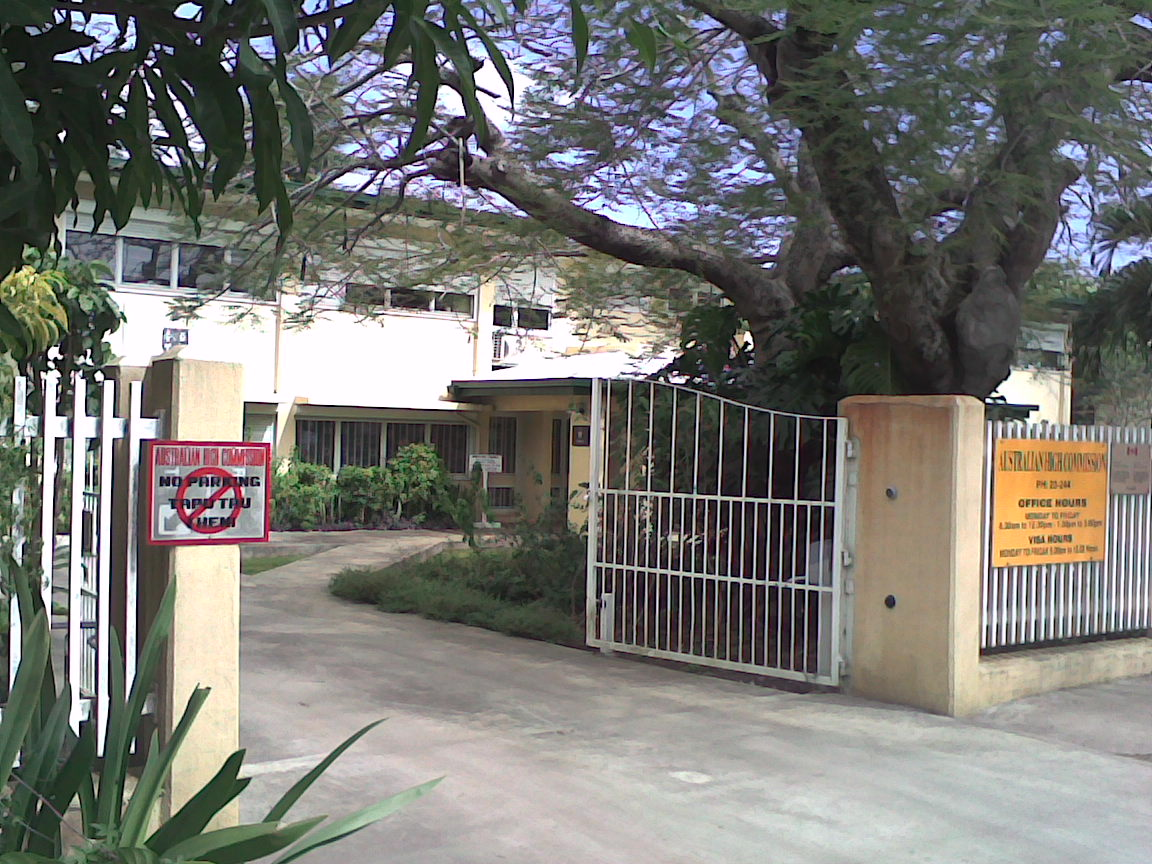
High Commission of Australia

Embassy of China

High Commission of New Zealand

== Non-Resident Embassies/High Commissions ==
=== Resident in Canberra, Australia ===
- Austria
- Belgium
- Cyprus
- Czech Republic
- Denmark
- Estonia
- Croatia
- Ireland
- Norway
- Romania
- Serbia
- Slovakia
- Sweden
- Ukraine

=== Resident in Suva, Fiji ===
- France
- India
- Malaysia

=== Resident in Tokyo, Japan ===
- Lesotho
- Senegal

=== Resident in Wellington, New Zealand ===
- Argentina
- Colombia
- Cuba
- Brazil
- Canada
- Germany
- Holy See
- Indonesia
- Israel
- Italy
- Mexico
- Netherlands
- Philippines
- Russia
- Singapore
- South Korea
- Spain
- Switzerland
- Thailand
- Turkey

=== Resident in other cities ===
- Eswatini (Kuala Lumpur)
- Seychelles (New York City)

== See also ==
- Foreign relations of Tonga
- List of diplomatic missions of Tonga
