= Russia–Tonga relations =

- Russia: Tonga

The Kingdom of Tonga and the Union of Soviet Socialist Republics established formal diplomatic relations in April 1976. The USSR was dissolved in 1991 and was succeeded by the Russian Federation as the successor state.

On October 2, 2005, Minister of Foreign Affairs of the Russian Federation Sergey Lavrov and Minister of Foreign Affairs of the Kingdom of Tonga ST T. Tupou exchanged telegrams offering congratulations on the occasion of 30th anniversary of establishing diplomatic relations between the two nations. In his heads of foreign ministries of Russia and Tonga expressed confidence in further development of Russian-Tongan relations in the interests of the peoples of both countries and strengthen peace and security in the Asia-Pacific region.

Russia has a non-resident ambassador in Wellington, New Zealand.

== See also ==
- Soviet-Tonga relations
