= Jean Chalvet =

French colonial official

Jean Victor Louis Joseph Chalvet (15 June 1893 – 28 July 1975) was a French colonial official.

Born in Tours, he studied at the École supérieure de commerce de Lille before joining the colonial service. His first overseas posting was to Mauritania in 1921. Afterwards he returned to France, obtaining a diploma from the École coloniale in Paris in 1927.

Between 1930 and 1944 he served in a variety of roles in French West Africa: in Senegal and Soudan (1930), in the Ivory Coast (1933), in Guinea (1936), in Dakar in the French West African administration (1939) and in Mauritania again (1941). During World War II, he was appointed acting governor of Mauritania by the Vichy government in 1942. By March 1944 he was one of only three Vichy appointees left in office after the Gaullist "rallyings". In May 1944 he was appointed governor of French Somaliland, but he lasted only a few weeks before Jean Beyries took over as acting governor.

In October 1946 he was appointed governor of Ubangi-Shari. In this last capacity, he did not get along with the anti-colonial activist Barthélemy Boganda. He left office in April 1948.

After a long retirement, Chalvet died at Vincennes in 1975.
