= Victor Liotard =

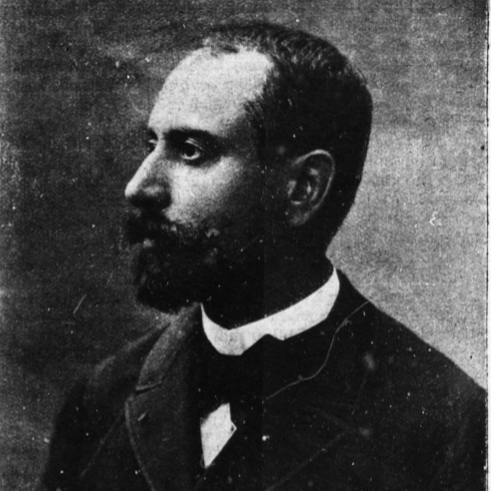
Victor Liotard

Victor Théophile Liotard (July 17, 1858 – August 22, 1916) was a pharmacist and French colonial administrator.

Liotard was born in Chandernagor, French India. He trained as a marine pharmacist at the Rochefort naval medical school, from which he graduated with the rank of assistant pharmacist in 1881 and pursued a career as a pharmacist on military ships.

He accompanied Joseph Gallieni on an expedition to Sudan in 1886. He then entered the health service of the colonies in 1891 and carried out a scientific mission in the French Congo.

He returned to France in 1898 for his statutory leave. He was governor of Dahomey from 1900 to 1906, New Caledonia from 1906 to 1908 and Guinea from 1908 to 1910.
