= Rallying of New Caledonia to Free France =

1940 coup d'état in New Caledonia

- Part of the Pacific Theatre of World War II
Date	June – September 1940
Location	New Caledonia
Result	Installation of Free French governor; Deportation of pro-Vichy officials to French Indochina

Belligerents
Free France; Australia	Vichy France

Commanders and leaders
(Free France) Henri Sautot; (Australia) Bertram Ballard; (Australia) Henry Showers	(Vichy France) Georges-Marc Pélicier; (Vichy France) Maurice Denis; (Vichy France) Toussaint de Quièvrecourt

Strength
1 light cruiser	1 aviso

Casualties and losses
None	None

The rallying of New Caledonia to Free France (French: ralliement de la Nouvelle-Calédonie à la France libre) was the defection of the French colony of New Caledonia during World War II from the Nazi collaborationist Vichy regime to the Free French movement led by Charles de Gaulle.

Following the fall of France in June 1940, the actions of pro-Vichy colonial governor Georges-Marc Pélicier brought him into conflict with French settlers in New Caledonia. The Vichy government despatched the warship Dumont d'Urville in response to an assassination attempt on Pélicier and replaced him with military governor Maurice Denis. By that time, de Gaulle had appointed Henri Sautot as Free French governor and the Allies had resolved to secure the islands' vital nickel mining industry and strategic location. In September 1940, the Australian government despatched HMAS Adelaide to install Sautot in the capital of Nouméa. The Vichy warship stood down and evacuated pro-Vichy officials to French Indochina.

== Background ==
=== Vichy government in New Caledonia ===
News of the fall of France and German occupation reached New Caledonia in June 1940 via Australian radio broadcasts. Georges-Marc Pélicier, the Governor of New Caledonia, was a career civil servant who governed with limited input from the General Council, a consultative body chosen from the Caldoche population of French settlers. The Caldoches largely opposed the occupation and the establishment of the collaborationist Vichy government, although there were some Vichy sympathisers in the capital of Nouméa. Opposition to the Vichy government was in part driven by concerns over the impact of the regime change on relations with Australia, which was a major market for the New Caledonian nickel industry.

On 24 June 1940, the General Council proclaimed its opposition to the armistice of 22 June and support for the Allies. Pélicier supported the General Council's proclamation, but soon aligned himself with the Vichy government and opposed moves by the General Council for greater autonomy, with his arrest of autonomist leader Michel Vergès and cancellation of Bastille Day celebrations sparking street demonstrations. On 29 July, Pélicier promulgated the new Vichy constitutional laws following a cable from Vichyist leader Philippe Pétain.

=== Allied attitudes towards New Caledonia ===
New Caledonia was discussed by the Australian War Cabinet on 18 June, which identified the colony as of strategic importance in a potential war against Japan, both for its geographical location and for its nickel industry. Nickel was a key component of contemporary weaponry and New Caledonia hosted the world's largest accessible reserves. The British government considered it possible that New Caledonian nickel could reach Germany via Japan and the Soviet Union, which were both neutral parties at the time.

In July 1940, the Australian government negotiated with the Société le Nickel to purchase additional nickel matte, in order to head off Japanese buyers. In the same month, Bertram Ballard was appointed as Australia's official representative in Nouméa, only Australia's fourth official diplomatic posting.

== Confrontation ==
=== Ouster of Pélicier ===
Pélicier's support for the Vichy constitution and news of General Charles de Gaulle's appeal of 18 June prompted the General Council to contact the Free French government-in-exile, seeking de Gaulle's support in establishing a Free French government and access to Australian markets. An assassination attempt was made against Pélicier on 18 August, when a bomb was thrown at his official residence. Pélicier requested military support and the Vichy government despatched a warship, Dumont d'Urville, from Tahiti. Its commander Toussaint de Quièvrecourt was a "confirmed Vichy supporter" and on arrival reported to Vichy authorities that the Gaullists were backed by the Australian government, which had annexation of New Caledonia as its goal.

On 28 August 1940, the General Council passed a resolution calling on the Vichy government to recall Pélicier. He was removed the following day and replaced by Maurice Denis, the commander of the local French garrison, as acting governor. Pélicier and his family left New Caledonia on 5 September.

=== Installation of Sautot ===
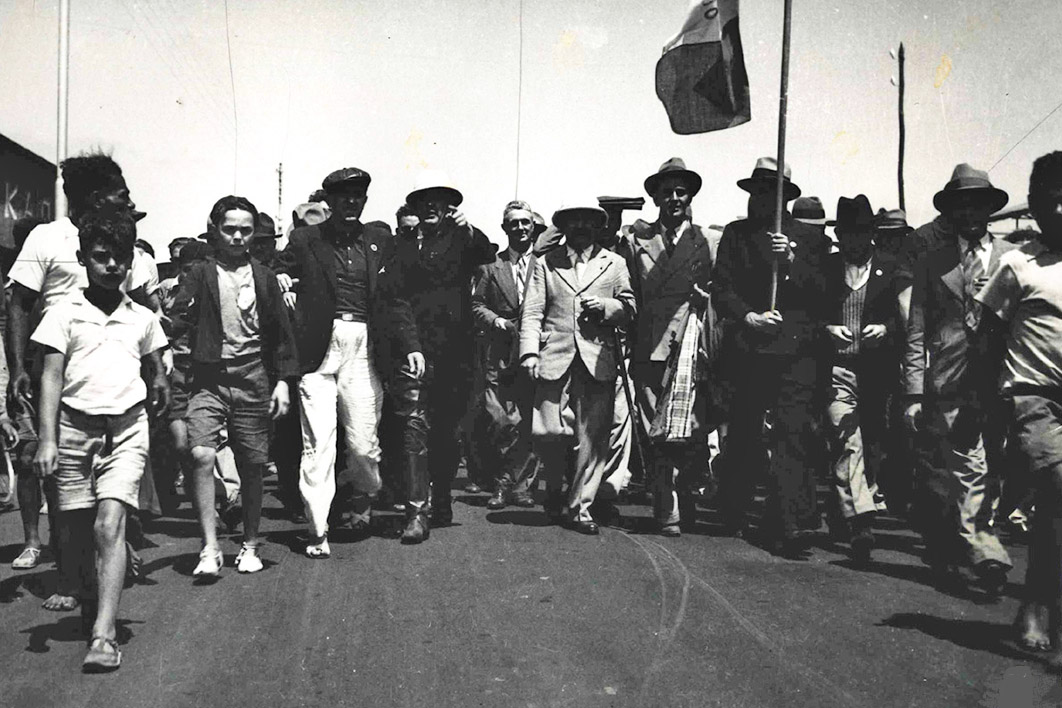
Free French governor Henri Sautot disembarking HMAS Adelaide on 19 September 1940

On 10 August 1940, de Gaulle wrote to Henri Sautot, the French resident commissioner in the New Hebrides, asking him to replace Pélicier as governor and establish an administration aligned with the Free French movement. Sautot had shifted his support to de Gaulle the previous month, with the New Hebrides – an Anglo-French condominium – one of the first colonies to rally to the Free French cause. On 28 August, de Gaulle made a formal request via the British government for a warship to be sent to escort Sautot to New Caledonia. The request was passed on to the Australian government, which was initially hesitant to agree on the grounds that it could be considered an act of war against France.

On 2 September, the Australian government despatched HMAS Adelaide to Port Vila in the New Hebrides while it continued to evaluate its position, relying on intelligence from Ballard and Harry Luke. Ballard reported to Canberra on 8 September that the local population would support the ouster of the Vichy administration in New Caledonia, which precipitated the Australian government's decision to actively support the coup.

HMAS Adelaide left Port Vila on 16 September, with Sautot carried aboard the Norwegian tanker MT Norden in accordance with de Gaulle's instructions that he should not be carried on a military vessel. They reached Nouméa on 19 September and found Dumont d'Urville in the harbour with its guns aimed. Shore batteries had also been given orders to fire on Adelaide, which were not carried out. Showers ordered Sautot transferred from Norden to Adelaide for his own safety. After several hours, Sautot was transferred to a Gaullist boat and sailed to the governor's residence.

== Significance and analysis ==
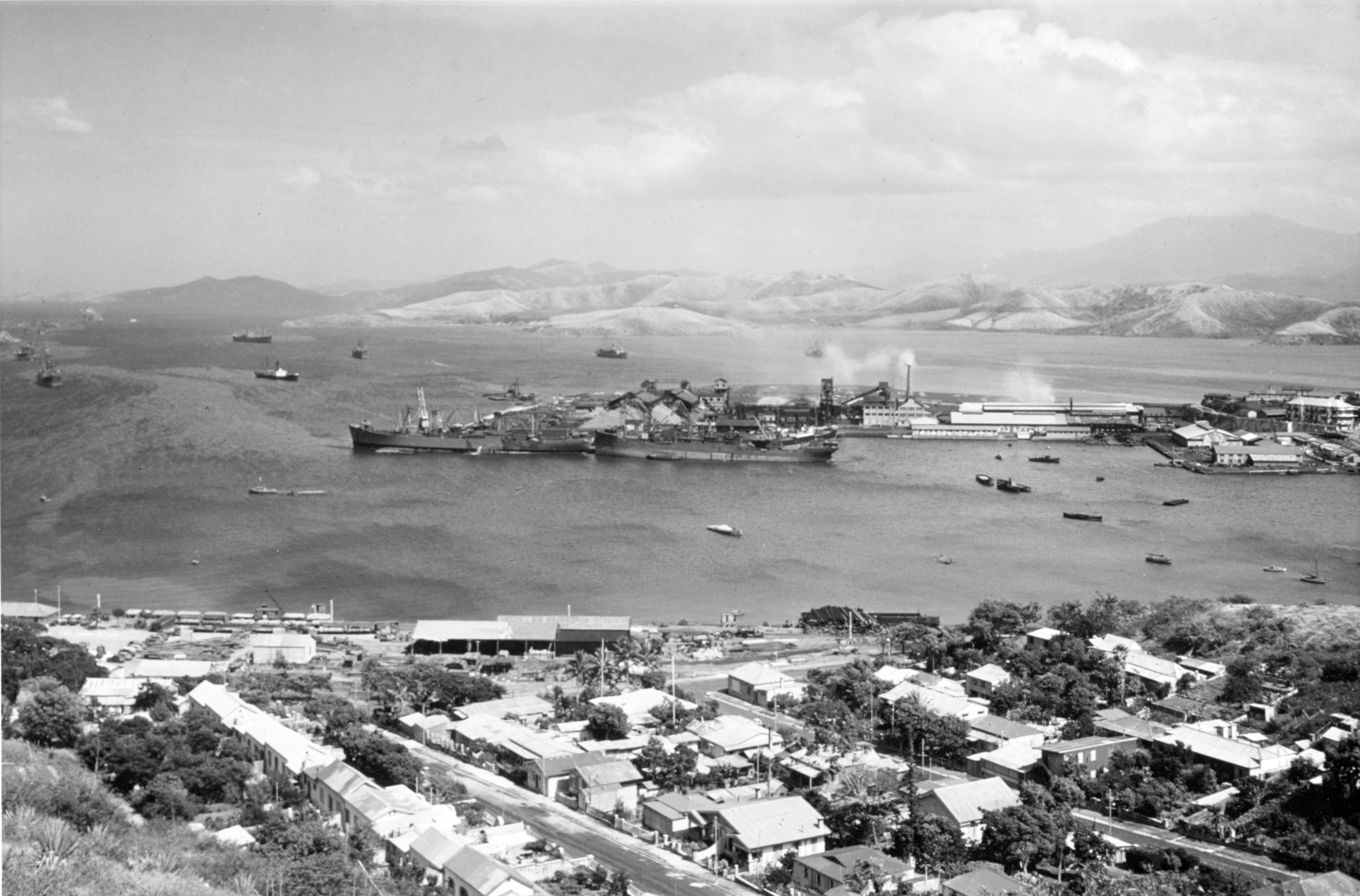
Naval Base Noumea in 1942

The rallying of New Caledonia to Free France effectively asserted Allied control over the strategically important territory and paved the way for the later use of Nouméa as a major Allied naval base. By 1942 there were tens of thousands of Allied personnel on the islands. The early association of New Caledonia and other Pacific territories with de Gaulle allowed the Free French movement to claim legitimacy and contributed to the retention of the French colonial empire after the war's end, along with France's continued recognition as a major power.

The installation of Sautot aboard an Australian warship has been described as a coup d'état and an instance of gunboat diplomacy.

According to Denise Fisher, the coup was the first time that Australia "appreciated the strategic importance of effective French administration of its near neighbour, New Caledonia, as a direct element in its own security". New Caledonia retained close economic ties with Australia after the war's end, although in 1943 Australian external affairs minister H. V. Evatt rejected suggestions that the territory be ceded to Australia or the United States and committed to the restoration of full French sovereignty over New Caledonia.

== Sources ==
- Fisher, Denise (2010). "Supporting the Free French in New Caledonia: First Steps in Australian Diplomacy" (PDF). Explorations: A Journal of French-Australian Connections. 49 (1): 18–37.
- Henningham, Stephen (2014). "Australia's Economic Ambitions in French New Caledonia, 1945–1955". The Journal of Pacific History. 49 (4): 421–439. doi:10.1080/00223344.2014.976915.
- Lee, Alexander (2023). "Nickel and the 1940 New Caledonia Coup". Australian Journal of French Studies. 60 (3): 290–303. doi:10.3828/ajfs.2023.25.
- Simington, Margot (1976). "Australia and the New Caledonia coup d'etat of 1940". Australian Outlook. 30 (1): 73–92. doi:10.1080/10357717608444558.
