= Pacific Tourism Organisation =

Tourism organisation in Oceania

The Pacific Tourism Organisation (SPTO), formerly known as the South Pacific Tourism Organisation, is an intergovernmental organisation for the tourism sector in the South Pacific. The SPTO markets, promotes, and develops tourism in the Pacific in overseas markets. The main office is located in Suva, Fiji.

Originally, the organisation was funded by the European Union as a form of development aid. However, EU funding expired in 2004 and was not renewed. From that point onwards, the SPTO was forced to find other sources of income, which resulted in China becoming a member of the SPTO.

== History ==
The organisation was established in 1983 as the Tourism Council of the South Pacific (TCSP). In 1985, the European Economic Community provided the council with US$2.6 million to establish a joint marketing strategy, promote tourism, and study its impacts. In 1999, following an organisational review, it changed its name to the South Pacific Tourism Organisation.

The organisation was formalised with a multilateral treaty, the Constitution of the Pacific Tourism Organisation. The treaty was concluded and signed in Apia, Samoa, on 18 October 1999 by the governments of American Samoa, Cook Islands, Fiji, French Polynesia, Kiribati, New Caledonia, Niue, Papua New Guinea, Samoa, Solomon Islands, Tonga, Tuvalu, and Vanuatu. All of the signatory governments have ratified the constitution, except American Samoa, which had left the SPTO in the 1980s. American Samoa rejoined the SPTO in October 2013. China signed the treaty and joined the SPTO in November 2004. Other nations have also joined, and as of 2026 the SPTO has 20 member states.

In 2019, the organisation renamed itself the Pacific Tourism Organisation.

== Organisation ==
SPTO's supreme governing body is the Council of Tourism Ministers that meets annually. The council's primary functions include monitoring and reviewing SPTO's policies, strategies, work programmes and budgets. It is also responsible for securing funding for SPTO's activities.

A board of directors that meets about three times annually is responsible for the general administration of SPTO's operational and financial policies. The Board has one representative from each of the member countries and six from the Tourism Industry Members (TIMs). The Board implements the policies approved by the Council of Ministers. A Chief Executive, appointed by the Board, carries out the day-to-day administrative functions of SPTO.
