= High Commission of Tonga, London =

High Commission of Tonga in London
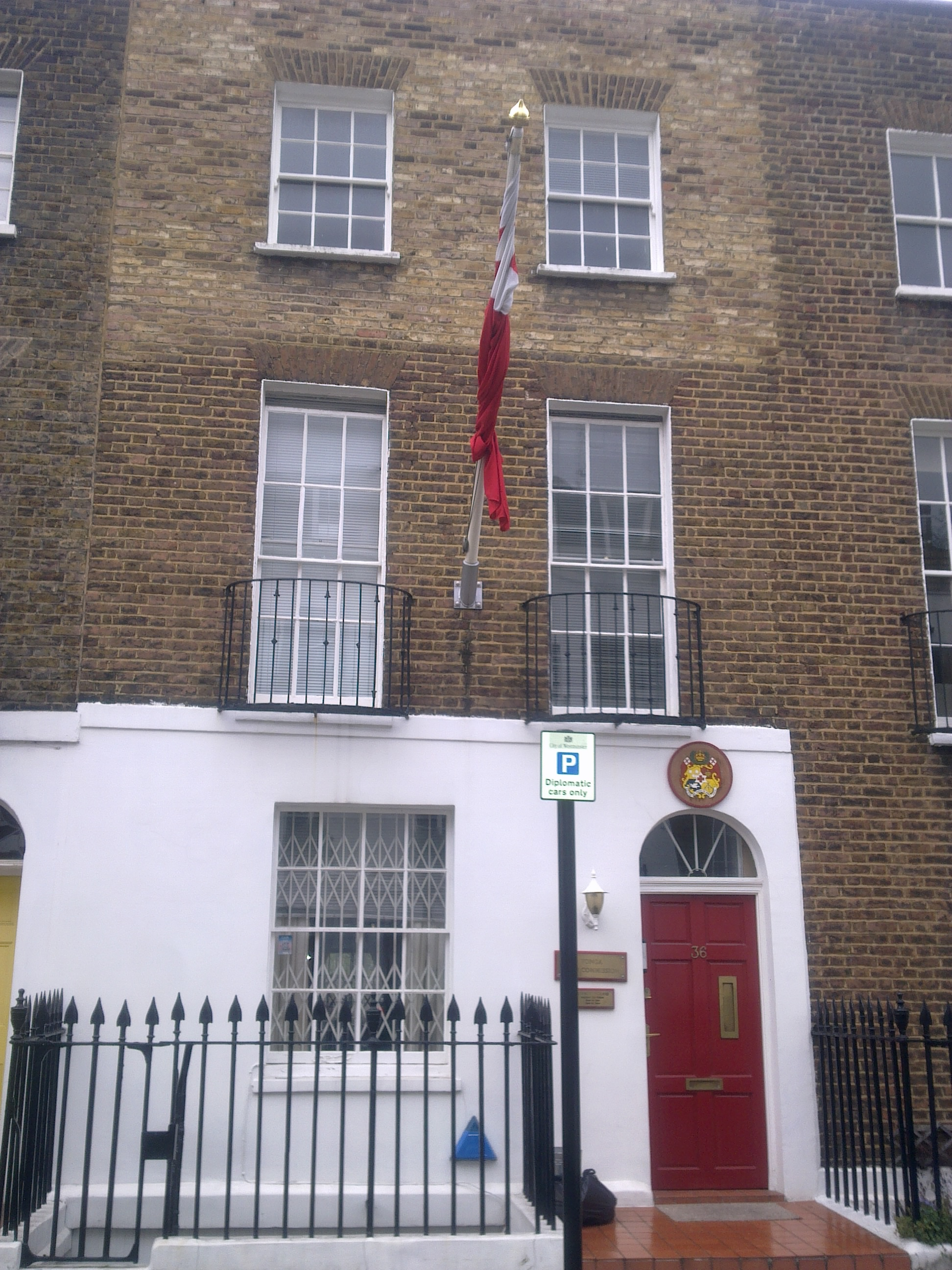
- Location: Marylebone, London
- Address: 36 Molyneux Street, London, W1H 5BQ
- Coordinates: 51.51807°N 0.16430°W
- High Commissioner: The Hon. Titilupe Fanetupouvavaʻu Tuʻivakanō

The High Commission of Tonga in London is the diplomatic mission of Tonga in the United Kingdom. Tonga and the United Kingdom established diplomatic relations in June 1970 after the Treaty of Friendship and Tonga's protection status ended.

The Tongan High Commission is located on 36 Molyneux Street in Marylebone, London.

== Gallery ==
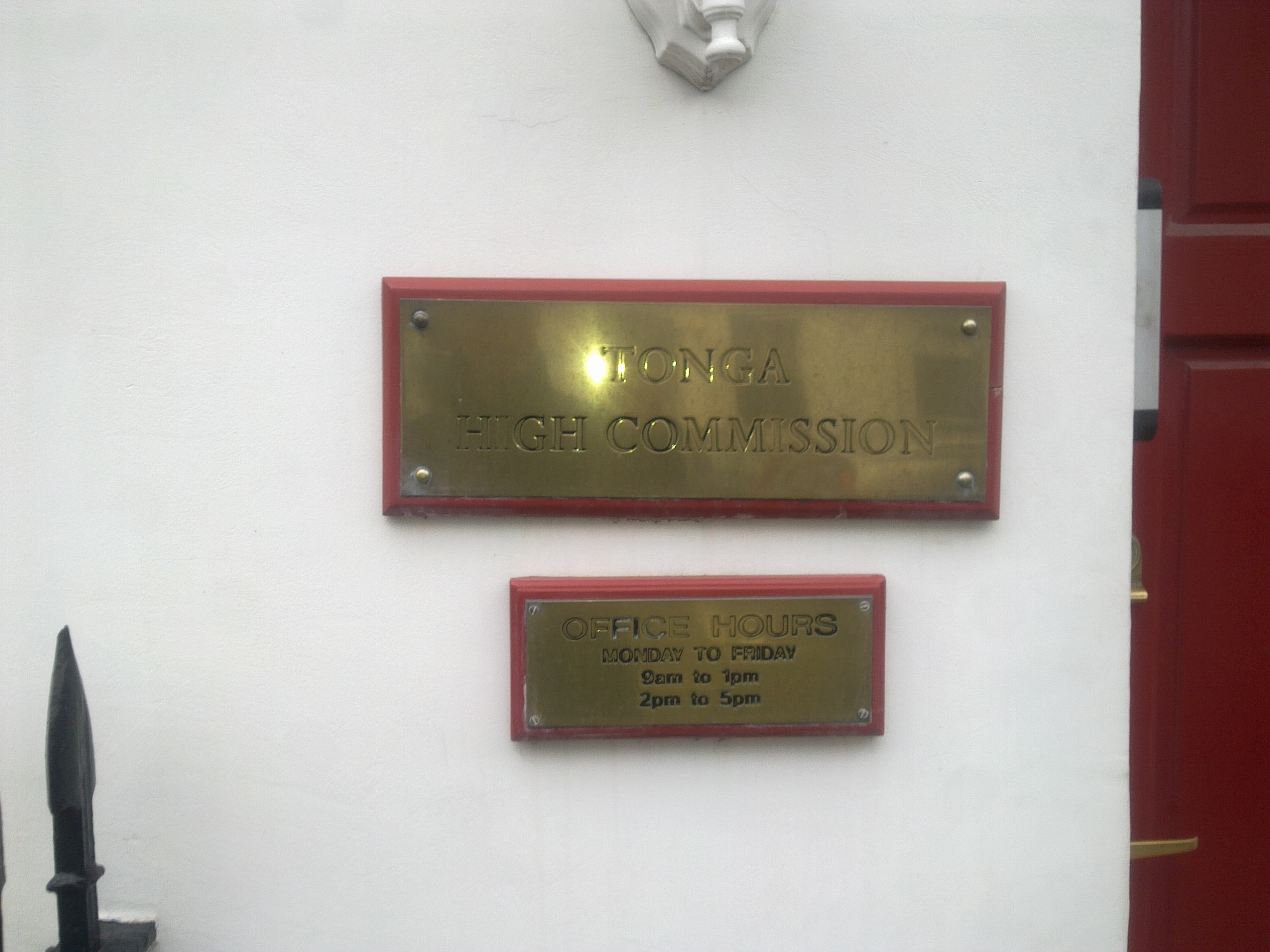
Plaque outside the embassy

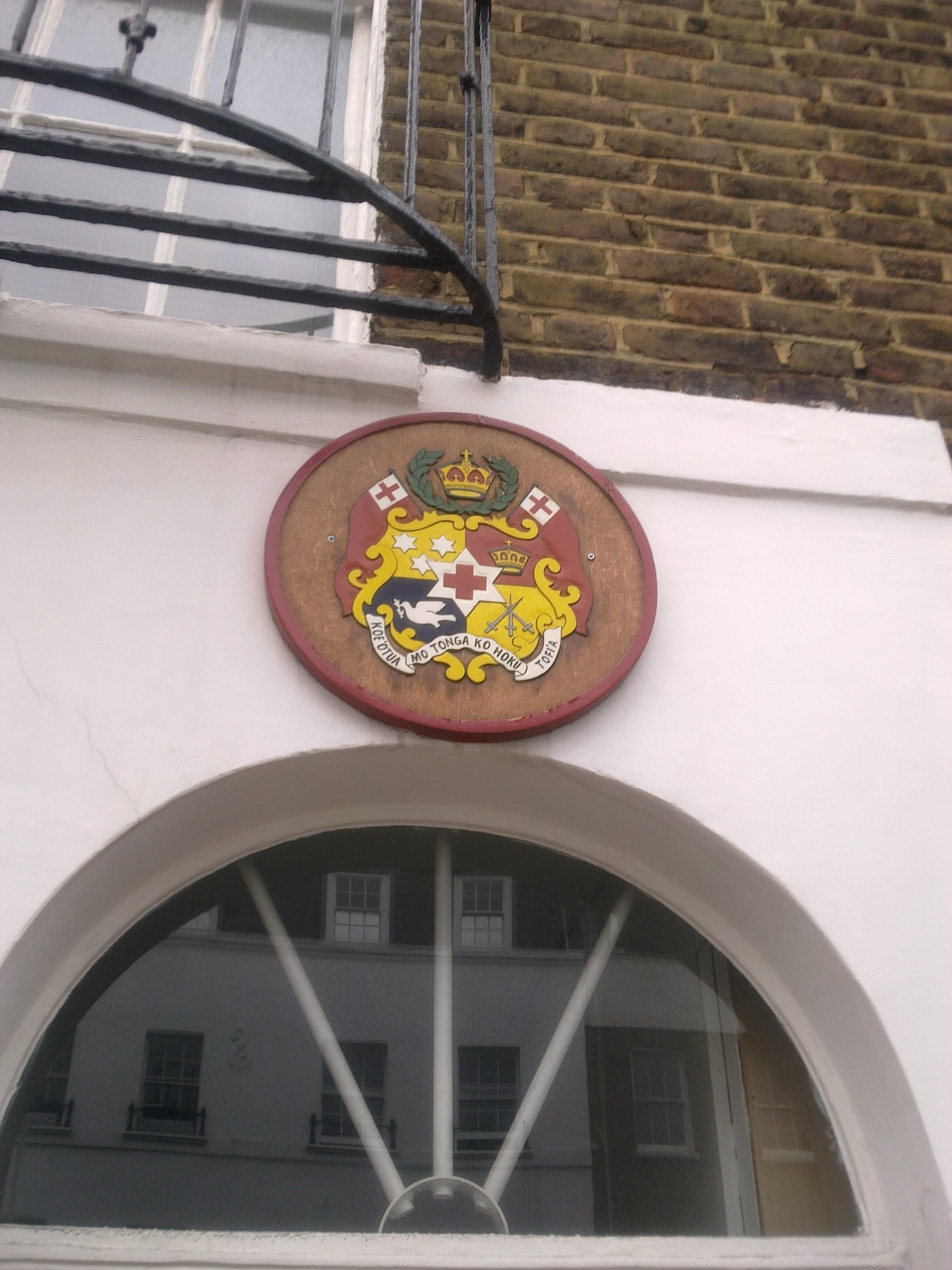
Plaque above the entrance depicting the Coat of arms of Tonga

== See also ==
- List of diplomatic missions of Tonga
- List of high commissioners of the United Kingdom to Tonga
