= Chris Cannan =

Australian diplomat

Chris Cannan is an Australian senior career officer of the Australian Department of Foreign Affairs and Trade (DFAT) who was the Ambassador to Israel from June 2017, until September 2020.

== Personal life ==
He grew up in Victor Harbor, South Australia and graduated from Victor Harbor High School (VHHS).

Cannan earned a Bachelor of Arts in journalism from the University of South Australia, a Bachelor of Arts in Asian Studies from Flinders University and a Master of Arts in Foreign Affairs and Trade from Monash University.

== Career ==
Cannan was head of the Environment Branch at DFAT and therefore, their lead negotiator at the Rio+20 UN Conference on Sustainable Development.
