= Henri Sautot =

French colonial governor (1885–1963)

Acting Governor of St Pierre and Miquelon
- In office 1929–1932
- Preceded by: François Adrien Juvanon
- Succeeded by: Georges Marie Roger Chanot

Resident Commissioner of the New Hebrides
- In office 1933–1935
- Preceded by: Antoine Louis Carlotti
- Succeeded by: Robert Casimir

Acting Governor of Tahiti
- In office 1935–1937
- Preceded by: Michel Lucien Montagné
- Succeeded by: Jean Chastenet de Géry

Resident Commissioner of the New Hebrides
- In office 1935–1940
- Preceded by: Robert Casimir
- Succeeded by: Robert Charles Henri Kuter

Governor of New Caledonia
- In office 1940–1942
- Preceded by: Maurice Denis
- Succeeded by: Auguste Montchamp

Governor of Ubangi-Shari
- In office 1942–1946
- Preceded by: André Latrille
- Succeeded by: Jean Chalvet

Personal details
- Born: 5 May 1885 Bourbonne-les-Bains, France
- Died: 23 March 1963 (aged 77) Nouméa, New Caledonia

Henri Camille Sautot (French: [ɑ̃ʁi soto]; 5 May 1885 – 23 March 1963) was a French colonial governor.

== Biography ==
Sautot was born in Bourbonne-les-Bains and attended school in Nancy. He studied at the Nancy-Université before carrying out national service.

Sautot became an Indigenous Affairs clerk in 1909, before becoming a colonial administrator in 1915. He was appointed chief of staff of the Governor of Dahomey in 1925, before becoming Acting Governor of St Pierre and Miquelon in 1929, serving until 1932. He was appointed Resident Commissioner of the New Hebrides in 1932, a post he held until becoming Acting Governor of Tahiti in 1935. He returned to his post in the New Hebrides in 1937.

Following the occupation of France in 1940, Sautot declared the New Hebrides' allegiance to the Free French on 20 July, the first territory to do so. He subsequently played a key role in the rallying of New Caledonia to Free France. On 13 September Charles de Gaulle appointed him Governor of New Caledonia. He sailed to New Caledonia and, greeted by large crowds on his arrival, went straight to Government House and removed Colonel Denis from office. He subsequently set up the Bataillon du Pacifique which sailed in May 1941 to fight in North Africa and Europe. He was made a companion of the Order of Liberation on 1 August 1941, later also becoming a Commander of the Legion of Honour and an Officer of the British Empire. However, after the new French High Commissioner in the Pacific Georges Thierry d'Argenlieu arrived in 1942, disagreements between the two led to Sautot being deported to Auckland in New Zealand in May 1942.

Later in 1942 Sautot was appointed Governor of Ubangi-Shari by de Gaulle, a post he held until retiring in 1946. He then returned to New Caledonia with his New Caledonian wife. He entered local politics, and served as mayor of Nouméa between 1947 and 1953.

Sautot died in a clinic in Nouméa in March 1963.
