= List of ambassadors of Australia to Estonia =

Ambassador of Australia to Estonia
- Incumbent; Edmund Mortimer since 30 November 2025
- Department of Foreign Affairs and Trade
- Style: Her Excellency
- Reports to: Minister for Foreign Affairs
- Seat: Tallinn, Estonia
- Nominator: Prime Minister of Australia
- Appointer: Governor General of Australia
- Inaugural holder: Robert Merrillees (as Ambassador of Australia to Sweden)
- Formation: 15 June 1961
- Website: Australian Embassy, Estonia

The Ambassador of Australia to Estonia is an officer of the Australian Department of Foreign Affairs and Trade and the head of the Embassy of the Commonwealth of Australia to the Republic of Estonia. The Ambassador has a part-time presence in Tallinn, the capital of Estonia. From 1991 to 2018, Australia's relations with Estonia were the responsibility of the Australian Embassy in Stockholm.

== List of ambassadors ==
| Ordinal | Name | Other offices | Residency | Term start date | Term end date | Time in office | Notes |
|---|---|---|---|---|---|---|---|
| 1 | Robert Merrillees | ^{A}^{B}^{C} | Stockholm, Sweden | October 1991 | January 1996 | 4 years, 3 months | |
| 2 | Judith Pead | ^{A}^{B}^{C}^{D}^{E}^{F}^{G} | Stockholm, Sweden | January 1996 | January 1999 | 3 years | |
| 3 | Stephen Brady | ^{A}^{B}^{C}^{D}^{E}^{F}^{G} | Stockholm, Sweden | January 1999 | January 2003 | 4 years | |
| 4 | Richard Rowe | ^{A}^{B}^{F}^{G} | Stockholm, Sweden | January 2003 | March 2007 | 4 years, 2 months | |
| 5 | Howard Brown | ^{A}^{B}^{F}^{G} | Stockholm, Sweden | March 2007 | 20 November 2009 | 2 years, 8 months | |
| 6 | Paul Stephens | ^{A}^{B}^{F}^{G} | Stockholm, Sweden | 20 November 2009 | 13 November 2012 | 2 years, 359 days | |
| 7 | Gerald Thomson | ^{A}^{B}^{F}^{G} | Stockholm, Sweden | 13 November 2012 | August 2016 | 3 years, 8 months | |
| 8 | Jonathan Kenna | ^{A}^{B}^{F} | Stockholm, Sweden | 24 August 2016 | 7 March 2018 | 1 year, 6 months | |
| 9 | Kerin Ayyalaraju | | Tallinn, Estonia^{[note 1]} | 7 March 2018 | 19 October 2021 | 3 years, 226 days | |
| 10 | Genevieve Clune | | Tallinn, Estonia^{[note 1]} | 19 October 2021 | 29 September 2023 | 1 year, 345 days | |
| 11 | Sridhar Ayyalaraju | | Tallinn, Estonia^{[note 1]} | 29 September 2023 | 30 November 2025 | 3 years, 31 days | |
| 12 | Edmund Mortimer | | Tallinn, Estonia^{[note 1]} | 30 November 2025 | Incumbent | | |

=== Notes ===
^[note 1] Embassy operates on a "pop-up" basis, with the ambassador resident in Tallinn for two months of the year and the embassy having a virtual presence for the remainder of the year. The Australian Embassy in Stockholm provides operational support.
^A Also served concurrently as the resident Ambassador of Australia to Sweden, 1991–2018.
^B Also served as non-resident Ambassador of Australia to Finland, 1968–2018.
^C Also served as non-resident Ambassador of Australia to Norway, 1970–2003.
^D Also served as non-resident Ambassador of Australia to Denmark, 1997–2000.
^E Also served as non-resident Ambassador of Australia to Iceland, 1997–2000.
^F Also served as non-resident Ambassador of Australia to Latvia, 1997–2018.
^G Also served as non-resident Ambassador of Australia to Lithuania, 1997–2013.

== See also ==
- Australia–Estonia relations
- Australia–Sweden relations
