= List of ambassadors of Australia to Sweden =

Ambassador of Australia to Sweden

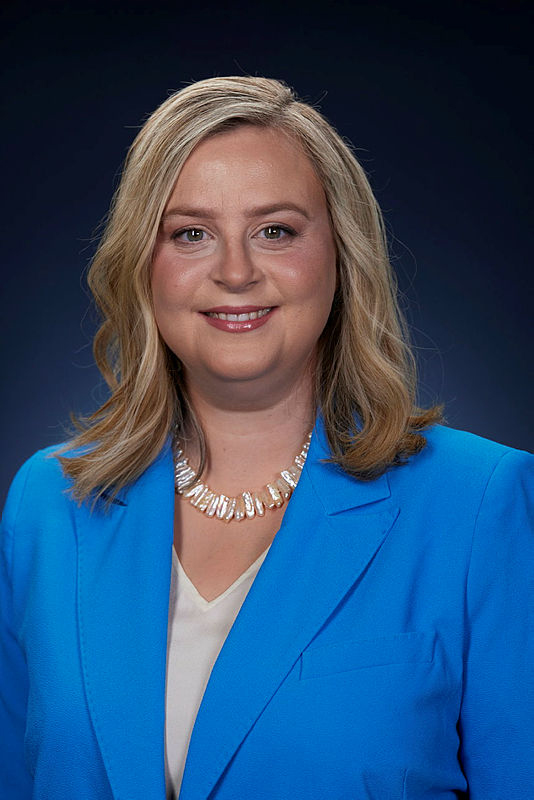
- Incumbent; Frances Sagala since 29 September 2023
- Department of Foreign Affairs and Trade
- Style: His Excellency
- Reports to: Minister for Foreign Affairs
- Seat: Waterfront Building, Norrmalm
- Nominator: Prime Minister of Australia
- Appointer: Governor General of Australia
- Inaugural holder: Bill Carney (Chargé d'affaires)
- Formation: 15 June 1961
- Website: Australian Embassy, Sweden

The Ambassador of Australia to Sweden is an officer of the Australian Department of Foreign Affairs and Trade and the head of the Embassy of the Commonwealth of Australia to the Kingdom of Sweden. The ambassador resides in Stockholm. The ambassador also holds non-resident accreditation for Finland (since 1968) and Latvia (since 1997). Accreditation has also previously been held for Denmark (1997–2000), Norway (1970–2003), Lithuania (1997–2013), Iceland (1997–2000) and Estonia (1991–2018).

== Posting history ==
The earliest Australian representation in Sweden dates to the appointment of a trade commissioner to Stockholm, which was first announced on 11 May 1958 with responsibility for promoting trade with Sweden, Denmark, Norway, and Finland: "the post would provide an important link in Australia’s trade liaison with the Scandinavian countries, which had recently formed the Nordic Common Market and were an important factor in the discussions now taking place for the formation of a European Free Trade Area. The Stockholm post would ensure far more effective contact with those countries on trade developments in Europe, which were of vital importance to Australia." The first Australia trade commissioner in Stockholm, Bill Carney, took up office in December 1958.

On 28 March 1961, the acting Minister for External Affairs, Sir Garfield Barwick, announced that an Australian legation would be established in Sweden, absorbing the existing trade commissioner's office, with Carney assuming office as chargé d'affaires ad interim from 15 June 1961. In November 1963, it was announced that the legation would be upgraded to the status of embassy, with the Australian Ambassador to the Soviet Union resident in Moscow appointed as the first ambassador to Sweden. On 27 September 1965, Bertram Ballard was appointed as the first resident ambassador to Sweden, and Ballard presented his credentials to King Gustaf VI Adolf of Sweden on 21 February 1966.

In May 1968 the Minister for External Affairs, Paul Hasluck, announced that the Australian Ambassador to Sweden would receive non-resident accreditation as Ambassador to Finland to exchange representatives at the ambassador level. In July 1968, the second resident Ambassador to Sweden, Roy Peachey, was appointed as the first Ambassador to Finland.

On 8 November 1970, the Minister for Foreign Affairs, William McMahon, announced the appointment of Peachey as Australia's first ambassador to Norway whilst remaining ambassador to Sweden and Finland. Peachey presented his credentials to King Olav V of Norway on 24 November 1970. In 2003, responsibility for Norway was transferred to the Ambassador to Denmark.

On 27 August 1991, Prime Minister Bob Hawke announced Australia's decision to re-establish full diplomatic relations with Estonia, with the Ambassador to Sweden, Robert Merrillees, receiving non-resident accreditation as Australia's first Ambassador to Estonia from 21 November 1991. Responsibility for relations with Estonia was held until 2018, when Foreign Minister Julie Bishop established a new Embassy in Estonia, which would function on a "pop-up" basis, with the ambassador resident in Tallinn for two months of the year and the embassy having a virtual presence based in Stockholm for the remainder of the year.

When the new government of Prime Minister John Howard cut the budget of the Department of Foreign Affairs and Trade in 1996–97, forcing the closure of the Embassy in Copenhagen, Denmark, in May 1997, accreditation for Denmark, Iceland, Latvia, and Lithuania, was transferred to the embassy in Sweden. However responsibility for relations with Denmark and Iceland was lost when the Embassy in Denmark reopened in May 2000. In 2013, responsibility for relations with Lithuania was transferred to the Ambassador to Poland.

== Officeholders ==
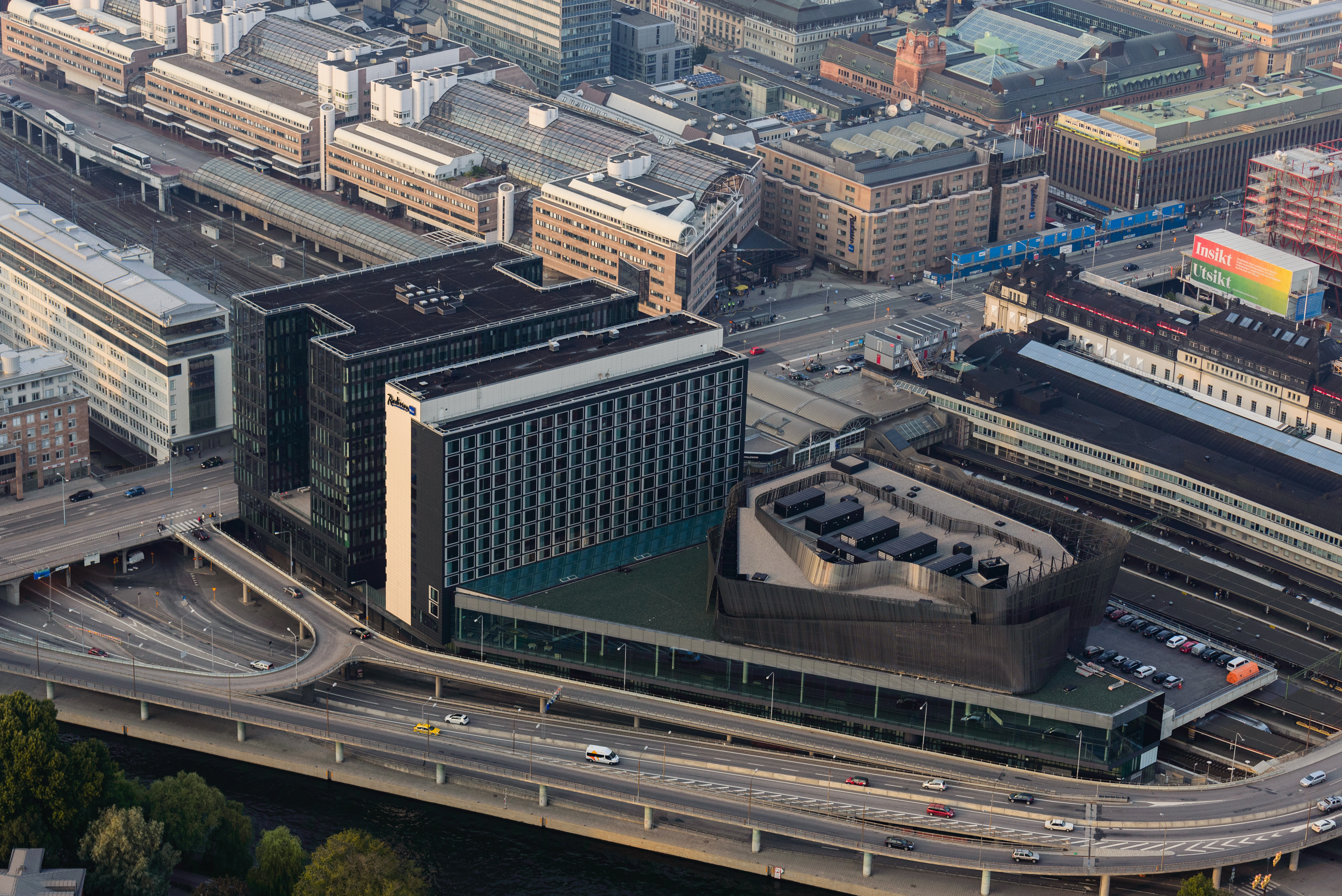
The Waterfront Building, home to the Australian Embassy chancery in Stockholm since July 2010.

#	Name	Title	Other offices	Residency	Term start date	Term end date	Time in office	Notes
−	Bill Carney	Trade Commissioner and Chargé d'affaires		Stockholm, Sweden	15 June 1961	12 July 1962	1 year, 27 days	
−	Frederick Gullick	Trade Commissioner and Chargé d'affaires		Stockholm, Sweden	23 July 1962	26 September 1965	3 years, 65 days	
1	Stewart Wolfe Jamieson	Ambassador	^{A}	Moscow, Russia	29 November 1963	March 1965	1 year, 3 months	
2	John Rowland	Ambassador	^{A}	Moscow, Russia	March 1965	27 September 1965	6 months	
3	Bertram Ballard	Ambassador		Stockholm, Sweden	27 September 1965	May 1968	2 years, 7 months	
4	Roy Peachey	Ambassador	^{B}^{C}	Stockholm, Sweden	May 1968	May 1972	4 years	
5	John Petherbridge	Ambassador	^{B}^{C}	Stockholm, Sweden	May 1972	September 1975	3 years, 4 months	
6	Lance Barnard	Ambassador	^{B}^{C}	Stockholm, Sweden	September 1975	June 1978	2 years, 9 months	
7	Brian Hill	Ambassador	^{B}^{C}	Stockholm, Sweden	June 1978	January 1980	1 year, 7 months	
8	W. Kevin Flanagan	Ambassador	^{B}^{C}	Stockholm, Sweden	January 1980	December 1983	3 years, 11 months	
9	M. Rosaleen McGovern	Ambassador	^{B}^{C}	Stockholm, Sweden	December 1983	February 1988	4 years, 2 months	
10	Ian Nicholson	Ambassador	^{B}^{C}	Stockholm, Sweden	February 1988	October 1991	3 years, 8 months	
11	Robert Merrillees	Ambassador	^{B}^{C}^{D}	Stockholm, Sweden	October 1991	January 1996	4 years, 3 months	
12	Judith Pead	Ambassador	^{B}^{C}^{D}^{E}^{F}^{G}^{H}	Stockholm, Sweden	January 1996	January 1999	3 years	
13	Stephen Brady	Ambassador	^{B}^{C}^{D}^{E}^{F}^{G}^{H}	Stockholm, Sweden	January 1999	January 2003	4 years	
14	Richard Rowe	Ambassador	^{B}^{D}^{G}^{H}	Stockholm, Sweden	January 2003	March 2007	4 years, 2 months	
15	Howard Brown	Ambassador	^{B}^{D}^{G}^{H}	Stockholm, Sweden	March 2007	20 November 2009	2 years, 8 months	
16	Paul Stephens	Ambassador	^{B}^{D}^{G}^{H}	Stockholm, Sweden	20 November 2009	13 November 2012	2 years, 359 days	
17	Gerald Thomson	Ambassador	^{B}^{D}^{G}^{H}	Stockholm, Sweden	13 November 2012	August 2016	3 years, 8 months	
18	Jonathan Kenna	Ambassador	^{B}^{D}^{G}	Stockholm, Sweden	24 August 2016	August 2019	2 years, 11 months	
19	Bernard Philip	Ambassador	^{B}^{G}	Stockholm, Sweden	29 August 2019	29 August 2019	4 years, 1 month	
20	Frances Sagala	Ambassador	^{B}^{G}	Stockholm, Sweden	29 September 2023	incumbent	2 years, 11 months	

=== Notes ===
^A Also served concurrently as the resident Ambassador of Australia to the Soviet Union, 29 November 1963 – 27 September 1965.
^B Also served as non-resident Ambassador of Australia to Finland, 1968–present.
^C Also served as non-resident Ambassador of Australia to Norway, 1970–2003.
^D Also served as non-resident Ambassador of Australia to Estonia, 1991–2018.
^E Also served as non-resident Ambassador of Australia to Denmark, 1997–2000.
^F Also served as non-resident Ambassador of Australia to Iceland, 1997–2000.
^G Also served as non-resident Ambassador of Australia to Latvia, 1997–present.
^H Also served as non-resident Ambassador of Australia to Lithuania, 1997–2013.

== See also ==
- Australia–Sweden relations
- Australia–Finland relations
- Australia–Latvia relations
- Australia–Estonia relations
