= Australia–Finland relations =

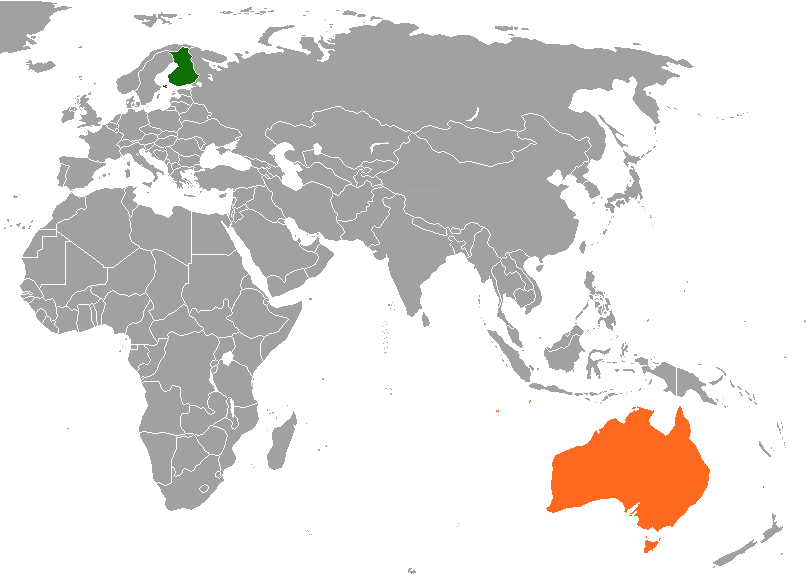

- Finland: Australia

Diplomatic mission
- Embassy of Finland, Canberra: Embassy of Australia, Stockholm

Australia–Finland relations (also known as Australian-Finnish relations) (Finnish: Australian ja Suomen suhteet) are the bilateral relations between Australia and Finland.

Foreign relations are present between Australia and Finland. Diplomatic relations were established on 31 May 1949. Australia is represented in Finland through its embassy in Stockholm, Sweden, and through an honorary consulate in Helsinki. Finland has had an embassy in Canberra since 1978, alongside honorary consulate generals in Melbourne and Perth, honorary consulates in Adelaide, Brisbane, Darwin, Hobart, and Sydney, and an honorary vice-consulate in Cairns. Both countries share common membership of the International Criminal Court and OECD.

== Diplomatic relations ==
=== Early history, 1917–1949 ===
Early diplomatic representation of Finland in Australia dates back to 1917, when the Grand Duchy of Finland declared its independence from the Russian Empire, with Finnish citizens being represented by Russian diplomats prior to 1917. Although the United Kingdom (representing Australia) would not recognise the new country of Finland until 6 May 1919, John Oscar Boijer, the head of the Finnish Seamen's Mission in Sydney, effectively acted as an unofficial consul. Boijer was replaced in February 1919, when the acting Prime Minister of Australia, William Watt, announced that Australia had recognised businessman Kaarlo Johannes Nauklér as the Consular Agent of Finland based in Sydney.

Nauklér was officially appointed Consul by the Finnish Government on 24 October 1919. His jurisdiction also included New Zealand, New Guinea and Oceania in general. On his appointment, the Daily Commercial News and Shipping List positively noted: "Finland will find that in Australia, she will acquire friends who will only be too pleased to trade with her, and by sending her representative here she has shown her earnestness." Nauklér was an accomplished athlete winning Australian championships in both javelin and discus throwing in 1919 and 1921 respectively. On 24 October 1919, Naukler was officially appointed as Consul for Finland in Australia, with responsibility for New Zealand and the Pacific Islands, which formerly received recognition from King George V on 15 December 1919. However, on 9 May 1921, Naukler unexpectedly died at the age of 31. It was later revealed that he had died by an overdose of morphia, taken as a result of marital issues, and his death was pronounced to be suicide. In his memory, the K. J. Naukler Cup was established by the NSW Amateur Athletics Association, presented to the winner of the most overall points in the annual competition.

Following Naucklér's death, another Finnish citizen resident in Australia who had been his deputy since August 1920, Harald Tanner, acted as the consul of Finland, and was later officially appointed consul in June 1921. Tanner also acted as the vice-consul for Estonia and occasionally for Latvia. In 1928, Tanner received official appointment as Honorary Consul for Estonia. Tanner organised annual receptions on Finland's Independence Day held at the Consulate at 4 Bridge Street. Tanner lived at 48 Aubin Street, Neutral Bay, where he displayed a variety of Finnish arts and crafts. On 20 February 1935, Tanner departed Australia, leaving Sydney for Finland on board the SS Nieuw Holland, and was replaced as Finnish consul from 1 March by Paavo Simelius. Simelius arrived in Sydney on 17 April 1935 aboard the RMS Maloja.

With the commencement of the Winter War between Finland and the Soviet Union in 1939, Simelius was involved in raising funds for Finland's defence and humanitarian support for Finnish citizens. By 1941, with the new war between the Soviet Union and Nazi Germany, the United Kingdom on behalf of Australia broke off diplomatic relations with Finland, as a co-belligerent with Germany, under pressure from the Soviet Union, who was fighting the Continuation War with Finland. On 30 July 1941, the Australian Minister for External Affairs, Sir Frederick Stewart, notified Consul Simelius that all Finnish diplomatic staff in Australia were considered persona non grata and were to leave the country at the next available opportunity. On his departure, Simelius noted: "I will be sorry to leave, for I have met with extreme kindness and courtesy from everyone in this country, Government officials and private citizens alike. There are between 1,500 and 2,000 Finns in Australia. The great majority of them are farmers, orchardists, sugar-cane growers and miners." At the time, Finnish citizens in Australia were considered to be non-enemy aliens. On 8 December 1941, following the United Kingdom, the Australian Government declared war on Finland, with Finnish citizens now considered to be enemy aliens. The state of war ended without shots being fired with the signing of the Moscow Armistice between Finland, the United Kingdom and the Soviet Union on 19 September 1944, and eventually the conclusion of the Paris Peace Treaty in 1947 of which Australia was a signatory. Australia ratified the peace treaty with Finland on 10 July 1948.

=== New connections, 1949–1967 ===
On 14 July 1949, the Finnish Government announced that the office in Sydney would be reopened as a higher level legation rather than a consulate, with the former consul, Paavo Simelius, appointed as the new Chargé d'affaires to Australia. Simelius arrived in Melbourne aboard the SS Orcades on 18 July, declaring "it's just like coming home to me". As the Finnish representative in Australia during the Coronation of Elizabeth II, he was awarded the Queen Elizabeth II Coronation Medal.

In 1954, the Finnish government moved to establish new offices in the Australian state capitals: Sir Harry Howard as honorary vice-consul in Perth, Sir Hamilton Sleigh as honorary vice-consul in Melbourne, Robert Newenham Irwin as honorary vice-consul in Adelaide, and Maldwyn Douglas Davies as honorary vice-consul in Brisbane. In 1968 Howard was honoured by President Urho Kekkonen with the Commander of the Order of the Lion of Finland and Irwin was made a Knight First Class of the Order of the White Rose of Finland. Simelius retired from his position on 31 July 1958, and was replaced as chargé by Toivo Kala, who arrived in Australia on 11 January 1959. Kala served until 1963, when Olavi Wanne took up the position of chargé on 23 April.

=== Later history, 1967–present ===
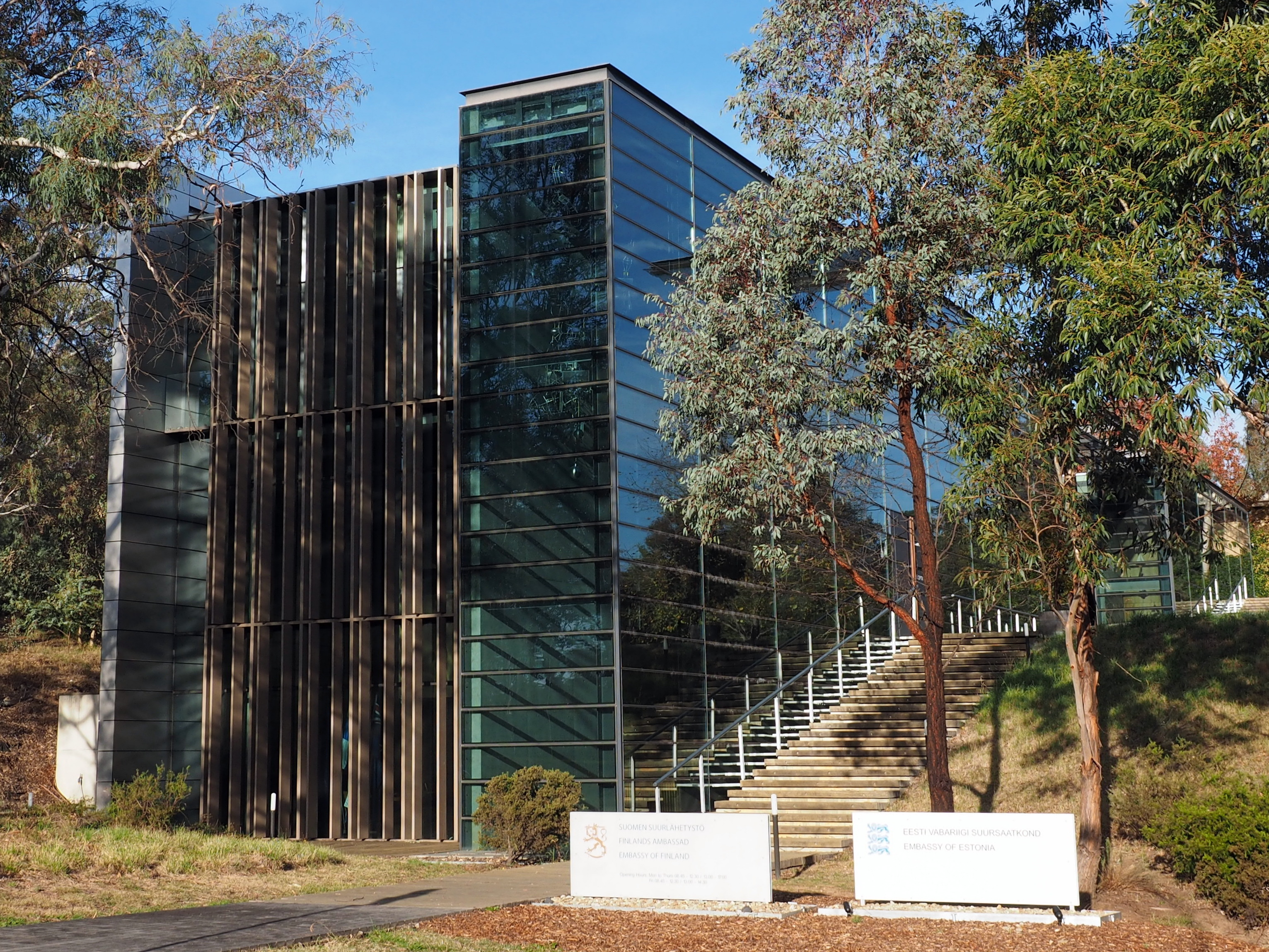
Embassy of Finland in Canberra, built in 2002.

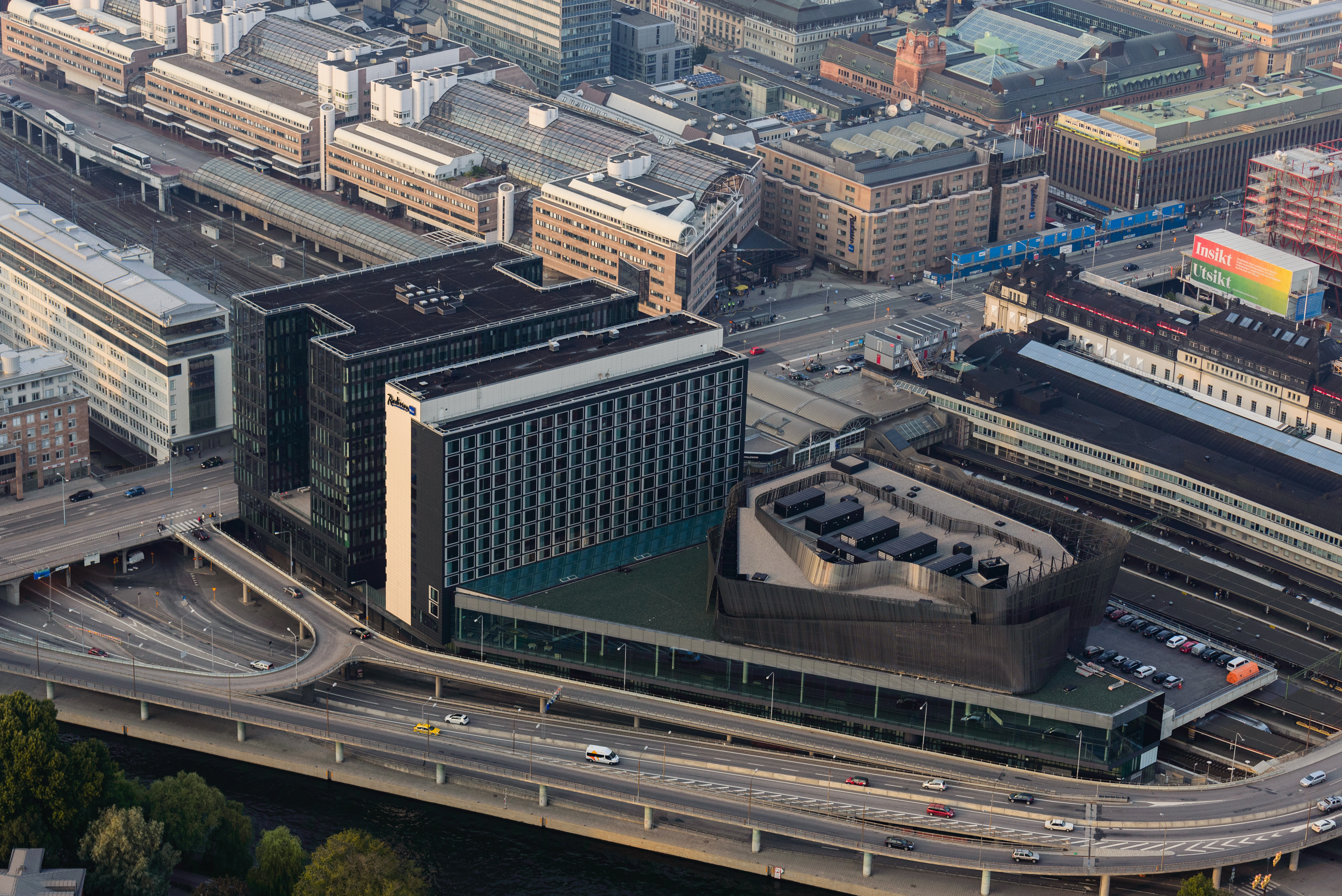
The Waterfront Building, home to the Australian Embassy in Stockholm since July 2010 (and is accredited to Finland).

On 1 March 1967, the decision was made to move the Finnish Legation to Canberra, and upgrade it to an embassy to coincide with the Australian appointment of an ambassador to Finland, which was completed on 2 June 1968. When Olavi Wanne returned to Finland early due to ill health, on 1 October 1968 he was succeeded as chargé by his deputy Peter Graf von der Pahlen.

Not long after the Finnish Embassy moved to Canberra, in May 1968 the Australian Minister for External Affairs, Paul Hasluck, announced that the next Australian Ambassador to Sweden would receive non-resident accreditation as Ambassador to Finland to match representatives at the ambassador level. In July 1968, the second resident Ambassador to Sweden, Roy Peachey, was appointed as the first Ambassador to Finland. In November 1968, the Finnish government announced the appointment of Tuure Mentula as the first ambassador of Finland (and later for New Zealand), and he took up office on 4 February 1969. With the Finnish Embassy move to Canberra, in 1971 an honorary consulate was established in Sydney headed by Charles Benyon Lloyd Jones, which was further upgraded to an honorary consulate general in 1973. In 1978 a new Finnish Embassy building on Darwin Avenue, Yarralumla, incorporating a chancery and ambassador's residence designed by Rommel Moorcroft & Partners, was opened. In 1995, Australia established an Honorary Consulate in Helsinki. On 15 August 1994, Chris Rann was made Honorary Consul for Finland in South Australia and in 2005, he was awarded the honour of Knight First Class of the Order of the Lion of Finland.

In 2002, a new Finnish Embassy chancery building was opened on the corner of Darwin Avenue and Forster Crescent, designed by Finnish architect Vesa Huttunen of Hirvonen-Huttunen, who won the commission in a 1997 competition, and the supervising Australian firm, MGT Architects. Its distinctive modernist style, drawing inspiration from the former Finnish coastal defence ship Ilmarinen, was praised at the time as "a testament to the excellence of Finnish architectural traditions". In 2015, half of this building was converted into the Estonian Embassy, creating a unique dual-embassy arrangement in a single building.

== High level visits ==
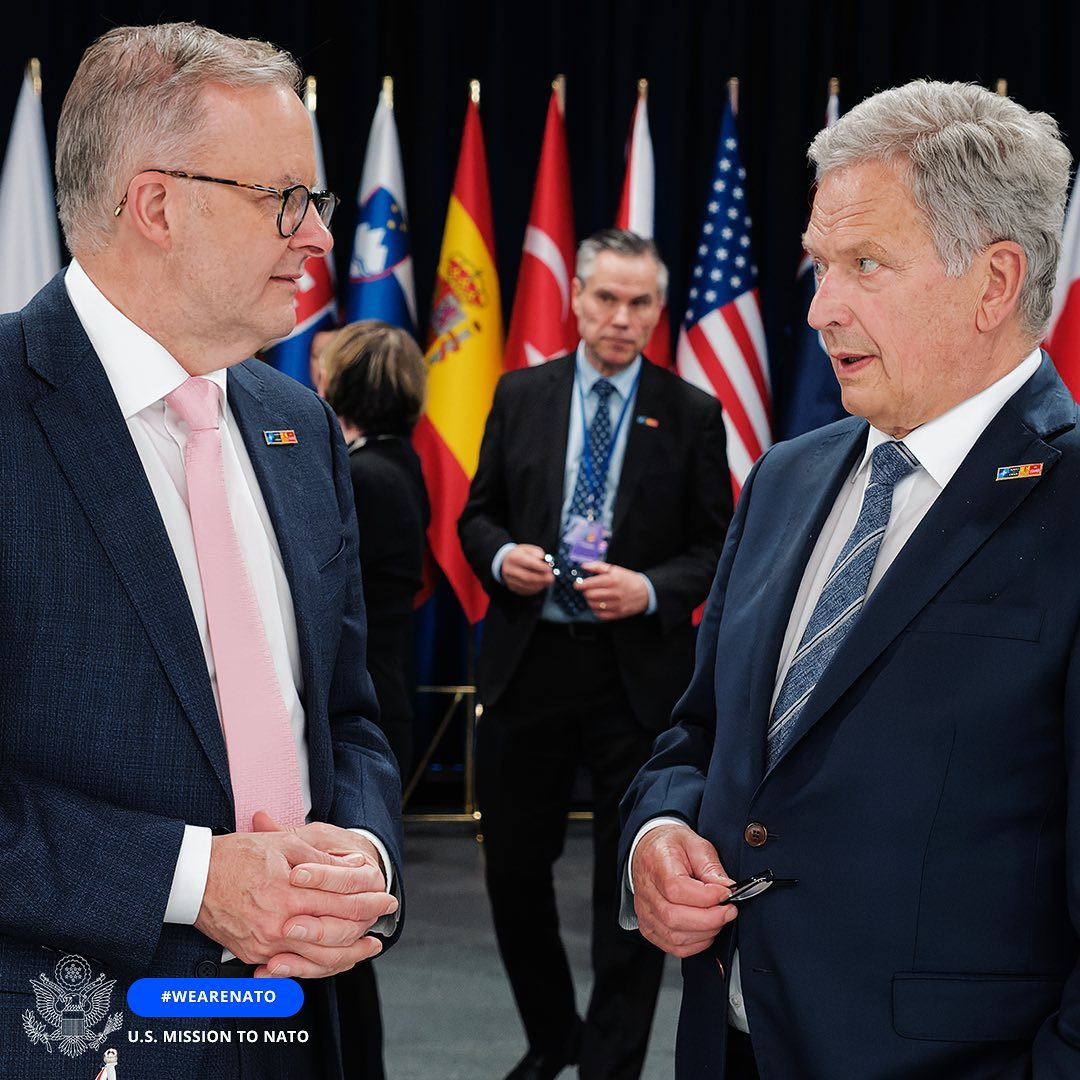
Anthony Albanese and Sauli Niinistö in 2022

- October–November 1990 – Parliamentary delegation to Sweden, Finland, Norway and Denmark led by Carolyn Jakobsen MP.
- 7–19 April 2002 – Parliamentary Delegation to Finland and Germany led by President of the Australian Senate, Margaret Reid.
- 13–17 February 2007 – President of Finland Tarja Halonen visited Australia.
- April 2010 – Foreign Minister Stephen Smith visited Finland.
- November–December 2013 – Alexander Stubb visited New Zealand and Australia as Minister for Foreign Trade.
- 2015 – Australian Environment Minister Greg Hunt visited Finland to discuss the state of the Great Barrier Reef.
- April–June 2016 – Governor-General of Australia, Sir Peter Cosgrove undertook a state visit to Finland.
- 29 February to 5 March 2016 – Minister for Foreign Affairs Timo Soini and Minister for Defense Jussi Niinistö visited Australia with a delegation of nine companies and organisations to promote trade.
- 2 December 2022 – Finnish Prime Minister Sanna Marin visited Sydney, the first visit of a Finnish prime minister to Australia, and met Australian Prime Minister Anthony Albanese.

== Trade ==
Monthly value of Australian merchandise exports to Finland (A$ millions) since 1988

Monthly value of Finnish merchandise exports to Australia (A$ millions) since 1988

Australia is an important trading partner for Finland, being Finland's seventh largest exporting country outside Europe. Total two-way merchandise trade between Australia and Finland was worth $1.2 billion in 2018. Australian exports to Finland were $88 million, comprising mainly coal and alcoholic beverages, while Finland's exports to Australia totalled $1.1 billion and included civil engineering equipment and parts, passenger and goods vehicles, and paper and paperboard. In 2018, Australia's total investment in Finland was worth $3.8 billion, with Finland investing $863 million in Australia. A number of Finnish multinationals including Nokia, Stora Enso, Huhtamaki, Outokumpu, Wärtsilä and Konecranes, have a presence in Australia.

== Treaties ==
17 Australia–Finland bilateral treaties covering various areas such as extradition, social security and taxation have been agreed between the two countries.

== Migration ==
Between 1921 and 1939, almost 2,000 Finns arrived to Australia. From the 1930s small Finnish communities formed in the mining town of Mount Isa and sugar industry towns of Tully and Ingham in north-western Queensland. Under the post-war General Assisted Passage Scheme, around 6,000 Finns moved to Australia, a level of migration that continued into the 1960s and 1970s.

Australia has an estimated 30,000 inhabitants with Finnish roots. The majority of Finns live near Brisbane, Sydney, Melbourne and Canberra. According to the 2016 census, the number of people born in Finland living in Australia was 7,711. The number of people who spoke Finnish was 59,577. As of 2022, there are approximately 25 Australian citizens permanently living in Finland.

== Resident diplomatic missions ==
- Australia is accredited to Finland from its embassy in Stockholm, Sweden.
- Australia also has a consulate in Helsinki, Finland.
- Finland has an embassy in Canberra.

== See also ==
- Foreign relations of Australia
- Foreign relations of Finland
