= Rann =

Rann may refer to:

== Places ==
- Rann (fictional planet), a fictional planet in the Polaris star system of the DC Comics Universe
- Rann of Kutch, Gujarat, India
  - Great Rann of Kutch, a seasonally marshy region located in the Thar Desert
  - Little Rann of Kutch, a salt marsh
- Rann, German name of the town of Brežice, southeastern Slovenia
  - Brežice Castle, in the town
- Rann, Borno, a town in Borno State, Nigeria

== Other uses ==
- Rann (film) (raṇa "battle"), a 2010 Hindi-language film starring Amitabh Bachchan
- Rann (magazine) was an Ulster poetry journal which ran between 1948 and 1953.

== People with the surname ==
- John Rann (1750–1774), English criminal and highwayman
- Chris Rann (born 1946), Australian publicist and media strategist
- Mike Rann (born 1953), Australian politician
- Thomas Rann (born 1981), Australian cellist
- Tyler Rann (21st century), American guitarist
- Charles Rann Kennedy (1808–1867), English lawyer and classicist

== See also ==
- Ran (disambiguation)
- Rann-Thanagar War, a comic book series
