= Chris Rann =

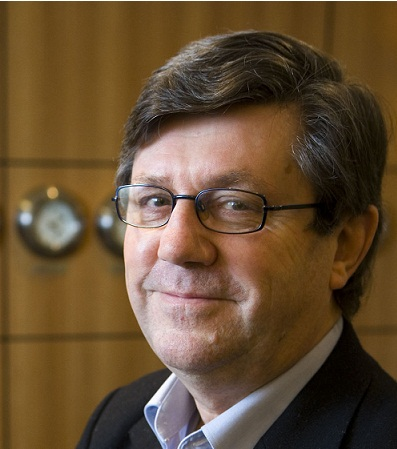
- Born: Christopher Rann; December 31, 1946 (age 79); London, England
- Spouse: Skye MacDonald (m. 2004)

Christopher Rann (born 31 December 1946 in London, England) is a publicist, media strategist and a specialist in global media and reputation management based in Adelaide, Australia.

A former journalist, freelance foreign correspondent and broadcaster, Rann is the managing director of Rann Communication, a public relations firm with clients and projects in many parts of the world. He is the brother of the former Premier of South Australia, Mike Rann.

== Career history ==
Rann began his journalistic career as a cadet reporter with the Matamata County Mail, a small country newspaper in New Zealand. From 1969 - while based in Auckland - Rann became a successful freelance correspondent for major international media, including CBS News (USA), Daily Mirror (UK), the Macquarie News Network in Australia and the South African Morning Newspaper Group. During this time, he attended and reported on, among other things, the independence celebrations in Fiji and Tonga (both attended by members of the British Royal family) and the Wahine ferry disaster, near Wellington, which claimed 53 lives.

Rann moved to Adelaide, South Australia, in 1972 where he was a senior reporter and sub-editor with the Australian Broadcasting Corporation. In 1983, he started his own media relations company, Christopher Rann and Associates, now known as Rann Communication.

Rann directed the public relations campaign to attract the $5 billion Collins submarine project to South Australia and subsequently promoted the launches of the six submarines built. He also managed the official opening of Olympic Dam, the world’s largest copper/uranium resource, at Roxby Downs in South Australia and, later, a major incident at the mine site involving a leaking tailings dam. As well, he coordinated the South Australian government public relations campaign to attract the 1998 Commonwealth Games to Adelaide (Adelaide was runner-up to Kuala Lumpur). In 2005 he helped restructure the Communications Office for the Catholic Church in South Australia, working directly with the Archbishop and Vicar-General.

In 2007, Rann advised the Finnish government on publicity management for the visit to Australia by the president of Finland. He also helped manage media relations for the 2008 visit to Australia and New Zealand by the King and Queen of Sweden.

Other notable roles have included:

- promoting a visit to Australia by 600 employees of Pernod Ricard China to familiarise themselves with the famous Jacob's Creek wine brand.
- managing international publicity for Adelaide Zoo before, during and after the arrival of two giant pandas from China.
- coordinating global media for the canonisation of Mary MacKillop in late 2010.

== Personal life ==
Rann is married to Skye MacDonald, a lawyer and development manager. They have twin daughters. Sahara and Willow, born on 12 May 2007. Rann has two adult sons, Thomas Rann and Charles Rann, from a previous marriage.

Since 15 August 1994, Rann has served as the Honorary Consul for Finland in South Australia. In 2005, he was awarded the honour of ‘Knight First Class of the Order of the Lion of Finland’ for his work in promoting Scandinavia in Australia and New Zealand.
