= Australia–Finland bilateral treaties =

The following is a list of international bilateral treaties between Australia and Finland

- Early treaties were extended to Australia by the British Empire, however they are still generally in force.
- European Union treaties, extended to Finland are not included below.

Entry into force	Topic	Title	Ref
1925	Extradition	Treaty between the United Kingdom of Great Britain and Ireland, and Finland, for the Extradition of Criminals	
1925	Extradition	Exchange of Notes between the Government of the United Kingdom of Great Britain and Ireland [and on behalf of Australia and New Zealand] and the Government of Finland extending to Certain Mandated Territories the Treaty for the Extradition of Criminals of 30 May 1924	
1925	Trade	Agreement between the Government of the United Kingdom of Great Britain and Ireland and the Government of Finland in regard to the Reciprocal Recognition of Tonnage Measurement Certificates of British and Finnish Ships	
1935	Civil law	Convention between the United Kingdom and Finland regarding Legal Proceedings in Civil and Commercial Matters	
1949	Other	Exchange of Notes between the Government of Australia and the Government of Finland reviving certain pre-War Agreements between Australia and Finland	
1951	Civil law	Exchange of Notes constituting an Agreement between the Government of Australia and the Government of Finland for the Release of Property and the Settlement of Claims arising out of the Second World War	
1961	Visas	Exchange of Notes constituting an Agreement between the Government of Australia and the Government of Finland concerning Visas and Visa Fees	
1963	Trade	Exchange of Notes constituting an Agreement between the Government of Australia and the Government of Finland for the Mutual Recognition of Tonnage Measurement Certificates of Australian and Finnish Ships	
1985	Extradition	Treaty between Australia and Finland concerning Extradition	
1986	Taxation	Agreement between Australia and Finland for the Avoidance of Double Taxation and the Prevention of Fiscal Evasion with respect to Taxes on Income, and Protocol	
1987	Extradition	Protocol between Australia and Finland amending the Treaty concerning Extradition of 7 June 1984	
1993	Visas	Agreement on Medical Treatment for Temporary Visitors between Australia and the Republic of Finland (Canberra, 6 August 1992)	
1994	Criminal law	Agreement between Australia and Finland on Mutual Assistance in Criminal Matters	
2000	Taxation	[Second] Protocol to amend the Agreement between Australia and Finland for the Avoidance of Double Taxation and the Prevention of Fiscal Evasion with respect to Taxes on Income, and [First] Protocol, of 12 September 1984	
2007	Taxation	Agreement Between the Government of Australia and the Government of Finland for the Avoidance of Double Taxation with respect to Taxes on Income and the Prevention of Fiscal Evasion and Protocol (Melbourne, 20 November 2006)	
2009	Social security	Agreement Between Australia and the Republic of Finland on Social Security (Helsinki, 10 September 2008)	
