= Anne Grete Riise =

Norwegian diplomat

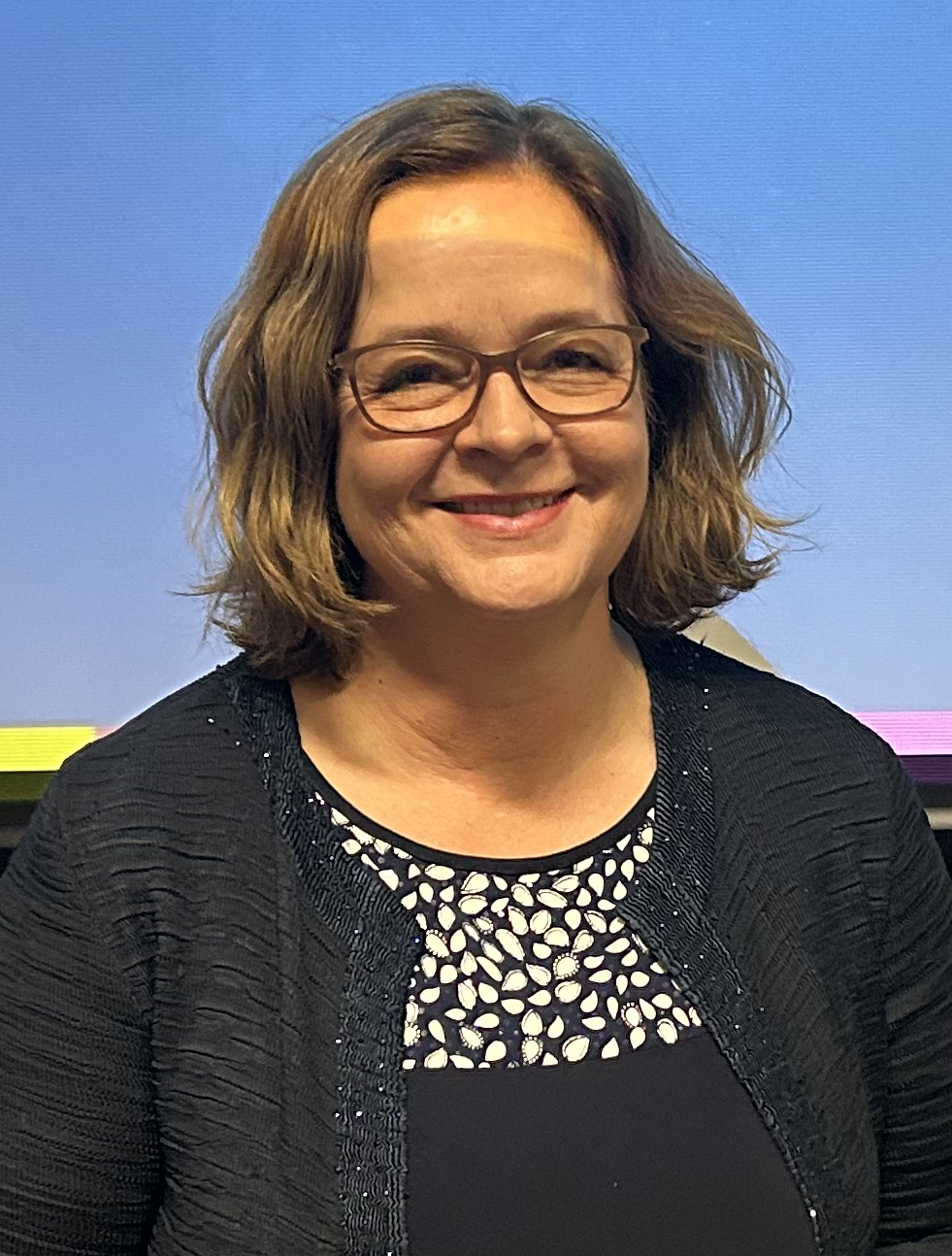
Anne Grete Riise

Anne Grette Riise (born 20 April 1964) is a Norwegian diplomat serving as the country's ambassador to Australia from 2022 to 2026. Prior to her current appointment, she worked as a liaision to the foreign ministry for the Norwegian Health Ministry's COVID handling unit and as a director in the foreign ministry.

== Early life and education ==
Born on 20 April 1964 in Bodø, Anne Grete Riise received her Cand. Polit. degree in political sciences from the University of Oslo.

== Diplomatic career ==
Riise entered the Norwegian Foreign Service in February 1992. Her first overseas posting was in August 1992, when she was posted to the embassy in Ukraine with the diplomatic rank of second secretary until August 1994. Following this tenure, she was deployed to Germany, serving at the embassy in Berlin from August 1997 to August 1998. She then shifted toward multilateral diplomacy, moving to the permanent delegation of Norway to the OSCE in Vienna with the rank of first secretary from August 1998 until August 2002.

After completing her early overseas assignments, Riise transitioned to domestic policy roles in Oslo. From August 2008 to December 2010, she worked for two years and five months at the Prime Minister's Office in Norway, serving in the capacity of senior adviser. Following her time at the Prime Minister's Office, she returned to the foreign ministry as deputy director from January 2011 to August 2013. Her next foreign deployment took her to Poland, where she worked as the deputy chief of mission of the embassy in Warsaw with the rank of minister counsellor from August 2013 to August 2016. Shortly before the end of her term there, on 19 May 2016 president Bronisław Komorowski of Poland awarded her the Officer's Cross Order of Merit of the Republic of Poland in recognition of her role in advancing Polish-Norwegian bilateral cooperation.

Upon returning to Norway, Riise resumed her work at the foreign minister as senior adviser from October 2016 to March 2020. During this three-year and six-month period, her responsibilities centered on analyzing the political and economic developments occurring in Central Europe, with a specific analytical focus on the Visegrad 4 countries consisting of Poland, Hungary, the Czech Republic, and Slovakia. In March 2020, she temporarily detached from her foreign affairs duties to assist with domestic crisis management, serving for four months as senior adviser for COVID-19 pandemic within the Ministry of Health and Care Services until June 2020. In August 2020, she returned to the foreign ministry to take on the position of director (Avdelingsdirektør).

In October 2022, Riise accepted her appointment as Norway's ambassador in Australia, based in Canberra. Operating from this current post, her ambassadorial responsibilities encompass a vast geographical territory; in addition to managing relations with Australia, she concurrently covers New Zealand and ten separate Pacific island states. In this role, she focuses on managing the large potential for expanding and strengthening bilateral and regional cooperation with Norway. She presented her credentials to Governor-General of Australia David Hurley on 10 October 2022, Governor-General of New Zealand Cindy Kiro on 15 March 2023, President of Nauru Russ Kun on 18 May 2023, President of Fiji Wiliame Katonivere on 31 May 2023, King's Representative in the Cook Islands Tom Marsters in June 2023, King Tupou VI of Tonga in April 2024, Governor-General of Papua New Guinea Bob Dadae on 19 June 2024, O le Ao o le Malo Tuimalealiʻifano Vaʻaletoʻa Sualauvi II 13 March 2025, Governor-General of Solomon Islands David Tiva Kapu on 30 April 2025, President of Vanuatu Nikenike Vurobaravu on 3 June 2025.
