= Australia–Estonia relations =

International relations between Australia and Estonia

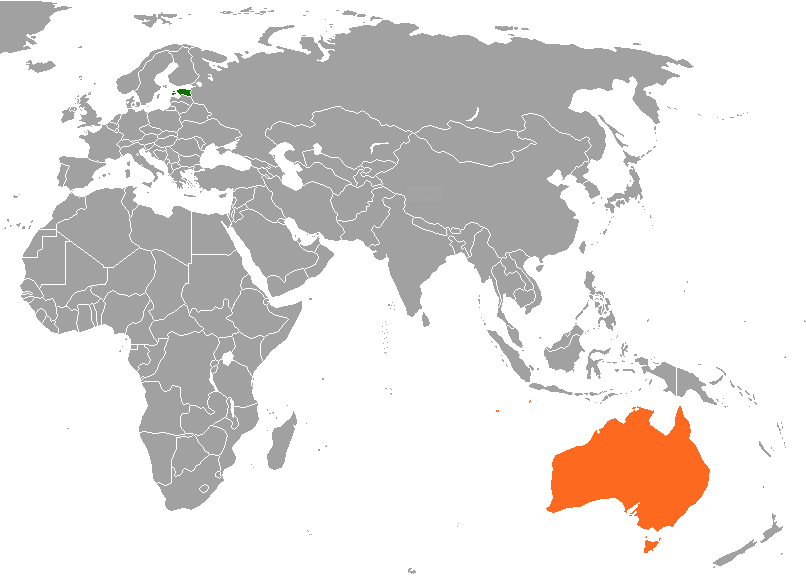

- Estonia: Australia

Diplomatic mission
- Embassy of Estonia, Canberra: Embassy of Australia, Stockholm

Envoy
- Ambassador Kersti Eesmaa: Ambassador Genevieve Clune

Foreign relations exist between Australia and Estonia. Australia first recognised Estonia on 22 September 1921. Australia was among the first countries to re-recognise Estonia's independence on 27 August 1991. Both countries re-established diplomatic relations on 21 November 1991.

Australia is represented in Estonia through a part-time embassy (since 2018) and Honorary Consulate in Tallinn (since 1995). Estonia has had an embassy in Canberra since 18 February 2015, which is also responsible for relations with New Zealand, Fiji, Tonga, Samoa, Vanuatu and PNG, and also has Honorary Consulates in every state capital.

== History ==
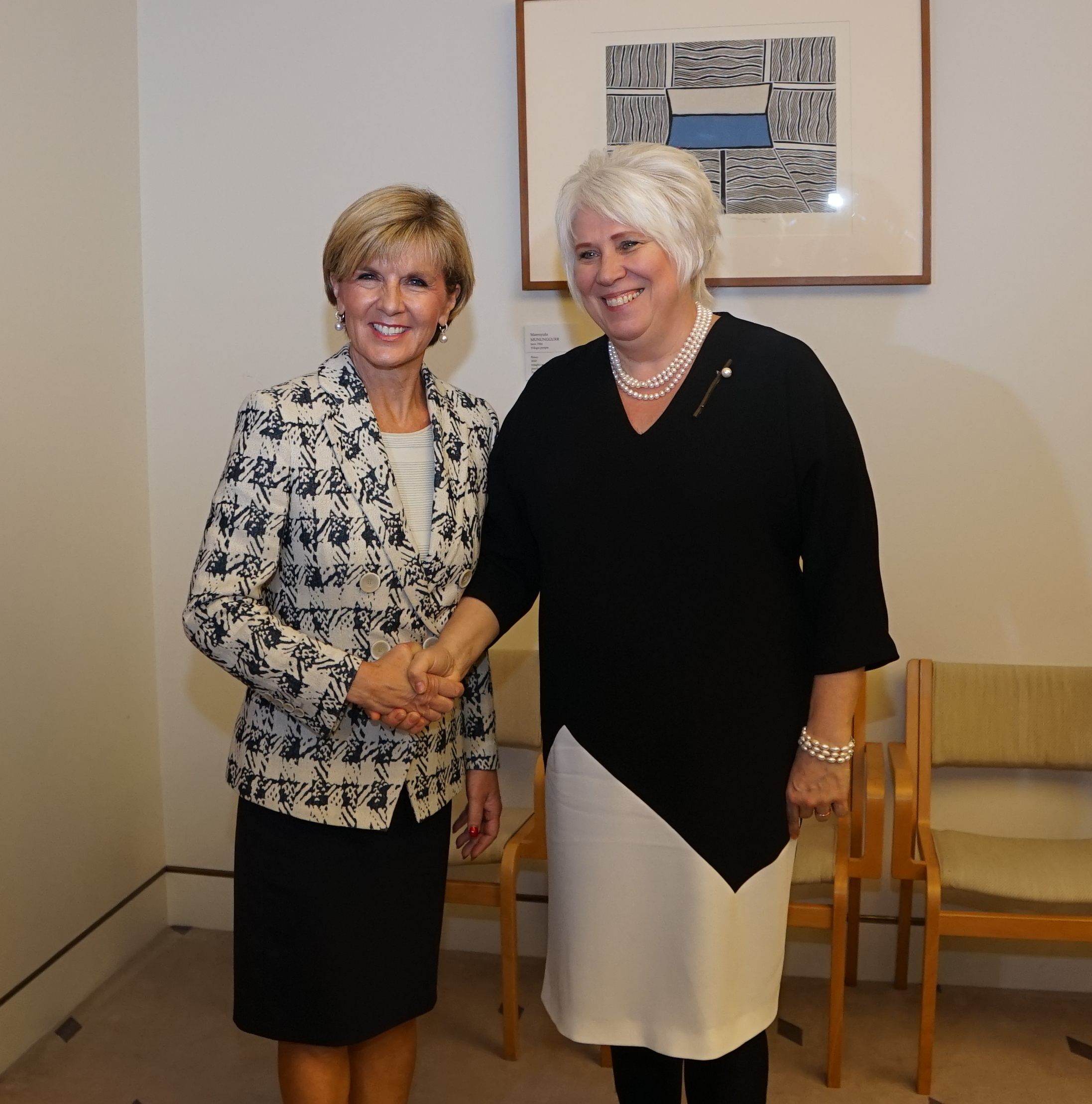
Australian Foreign Minister Julie Bishop (at left) meeting with Estonian Foreign Minister Marina Kaljurand during Kaljurand's visit to Australia in February 2016

Early diplomatic representation of Estonia as part of the Russian Empire (within the Governorates of Estonia and Livonia) in Australia dates back to 1894, when the Ministry of Foreign Affairs of the Russian Empire sent its first permanent consular representatives to Australia, based in Melbourne, and Estonians were counted in official statistics as part of the Russian community. The second Russian Consul in Australia from 1895 to 1898, Robert von Ungern-Sternberg Freiherr von Pirkel was an Estonian of Baltic German nobility, born in 1845 on the island of Dagö (now known as Hiiumaa). Following the Estonian Declaration of Independence in 1918, from 1919 to 1935, Estonia was represented in Australia by the Finnish Consulate in Sydney, another country that had emerged from the dissolution of the Russian Empire. Formal relations between the two countries began when Australia recognised Estonia on its admission to the League of Nations on 22 September 1921. In 1922, Finnish Consul Harald Tanner was named Honorary Consul of Estonia in Sydney, and served until Estonia sent their own representative in 1935. In 1935 Estonia appointed its own honorary consul, Johannes Kaiv, who served until his promotion to Consul-General in New York in 1939. Kaiv was succeeded as acting Honorary Consul and later Honorary Vice-Consul (from October 1939) by prominent local Estonian Arvid Mielen. In October 1940, the Estonian government-in-exile directed the closure of the consulate and its records were given to the Swedish Consulate for storage.

=== Relations during the Soviet occupation ===
With the Soviet Occupation of the Baltic States in June 1940, the Australian Government of Robert Menzies, like the British Government, did not recognise this action but the Minister for External Affairs, Sir Frederick Stewart, later confirmed in June 1941 that informal discussions had occurred that implied a "readiness on the part of the United Kingdom Government to settle on a practical basis various questions arising out of the Soviet annexation of the Baltic States." In 1948, the Soviet Embassy in Canberra made the announcement that "all persons from the Baltic States now resident in Australia would be registered as Soviet citizens", which met the response from the Australian Government of Ben Chifley that Australia did not recognise the Soviet annexation of the Baltic States and any citizens of those states resident in Australia would not be compelled to undertake any action in this regard.

By March 1949, in a Senate debate on the United Nations General Assembly's Third Session, the Minister for Health and Social Services, Senator Nick McKenna, noted the status quo of the situation:

"The Australian Government has not recognised, and does not intend to recognise, the absorption into the Soviet Union of the formerly independent republics of Latvia, Lithuania, and Estonia. The Australian Government believes that these accessions by the Soviet Union cannot be said to have been made as a result of the clearly expressed wish of the people of those countries. I draw the attention of the Senate to the action of the Minister for Immigration (Mr. Calwell) some time ago when a request was made on behalf of Soviet Russia that nationals of those countries should register in Australia as members of the Soviet Republic. The Senate will recall that an announcement was made that they were under no obligation to do that, and that if they cared to do so it would be of their own volition and not as the result of any pressure on the part of this Government or of any obligation the Australian Government felt was cast upon them. However, the absorption of those countries by Soviet Russia is an accomplished fact. I doubt whether this or any other Government could take action that would result in a change being effected in the foreseeable future."

In March 1970 the Minister for External Affairs in the Gorton Government, William McMahon, noted in Parliament: "The legal position is that Australia has never withdrawn recognition from the Governments of Estonia, Latvia, and Lithuania which were forced into exile by the U.S.S.R.'s invasion and occupation of those States in 1940. Australia has not explicitly extended recognition to any particular Government which may regard itself as a successor to one of those Governments which Australia recognised in 1940." Australia was the only Western country to break ranks and briefly recognise the Soviet annexation of Estonia (and the other Baltic states) as de jure for 17 months between July 1974 to December 1975 by the Whitlam Labor government, while most other countries continued to recognise the independent Estonian diplomatic missions. In explaining the change of position, the Minister for Repatriation and Compensation and prominent critic of Soviet foreign policy, Senator John Wheeldon, noted to the Senate in September 1974:

"What is the situation with regard to Lithuania, Latvia and Estonia which are or were three of the Baltic states? Their incorporation in the Soviet Union is one of the most shameful acts in modern European history. It was something which took place as a result of a disgraceful, shameful and discreditable treaty signed in Moscow in 1939 between Stalin and Ribbentrop, the then nazi Foreign Minister. [...] At the present time one of the most important problems facing the whole of the world's people is to bring about what for some mysterious reason - I have never quite known why - is called détente, a relaxation, an end to the cold war, a certain amount of give and take by the two major sides in the present world conflict. One of the things that has to be done in order to bring that about is to face a number of realities and some of those realities are unpalatable. There has to be some recognition of the fact that whether we like it or not or anyone else likes it or not, or whether it is just or unjust- and I believe it is unjust and I do not like it - Latvia, Lithuania and Estonia have been incorporated into the Soviet Union. To continue to say they are not part of the Soviet Union while the Soviet Government and I daresay a majority of the Soviet people believe that they are is something which lessens opportunities for bringing about peaceful settlements with the Soviet Union, and peaceful settlements with the Soviet Union are essential."

Following the election of the new conservative Coalition government of Malcolm Fraser in November 1975, the new government withdrew de jure recognition of the incorporation of Estonia into the Soviet Union. On 17 December of that year the Australian government instructed the Australian ambassador in Moscow that he and his staff were not to make any official visits to the Estonian SSR. Independent Estonian consular representatives returned and were maintained until the restoration of independence in 1991. On 27 August 1991, Prime Minister Bob Hawke, announced Australia's decision to re-establish full diplomatic relations with Estonia. The Australian Ambassador to Sweden, Robert Merrillees, received non-resident accreditation as Australia's first Ambassador to Estonia from 21 November 1991.

=== Relations after 1991 ===
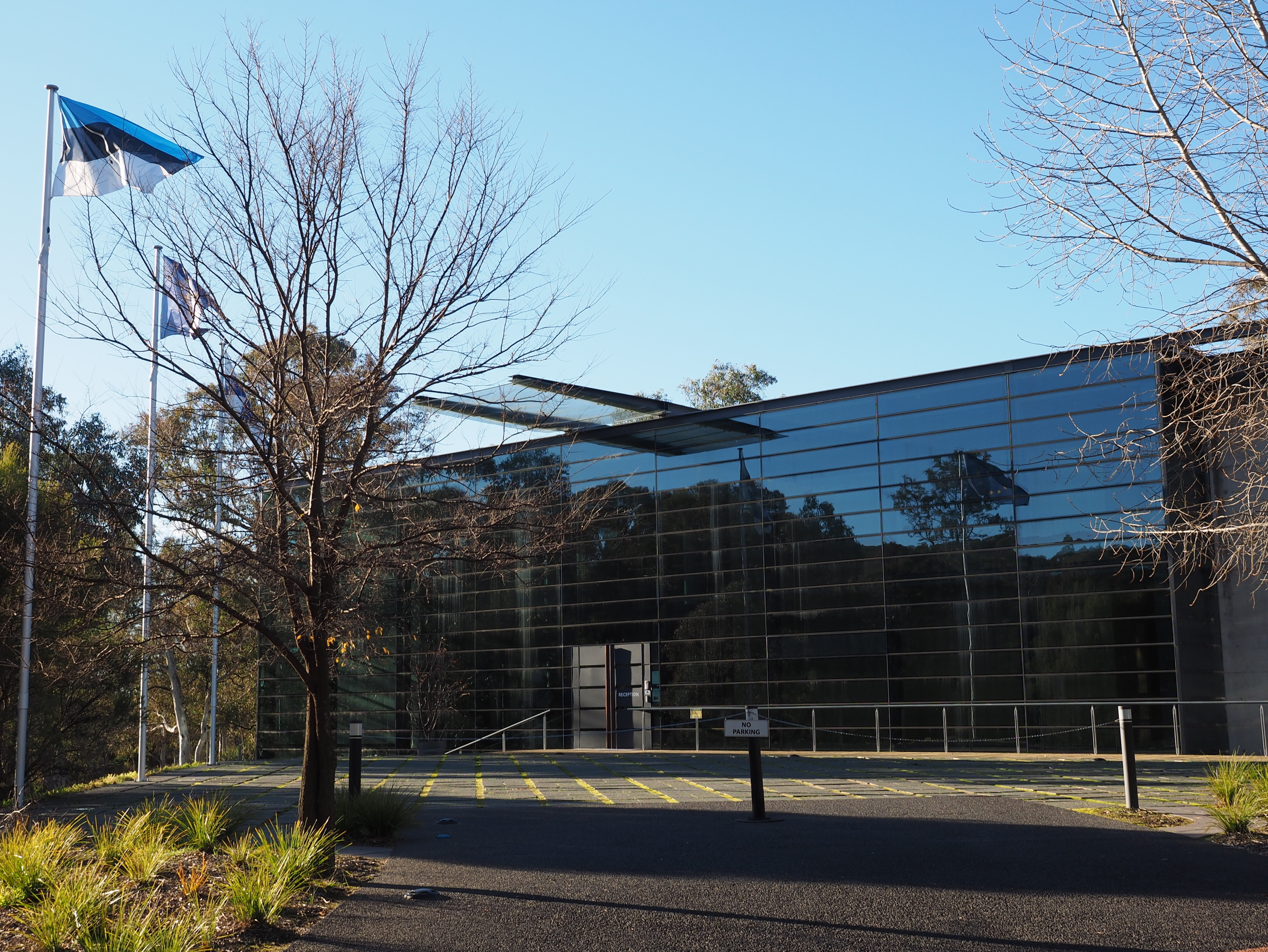
The Estonian Embassy in Yarralumla, co-located with the Finnish Embassy in Canberra.

As part of a significant expansion of Australian Honorary Consulates, Foreign Minister Gareth Evans announced the appointment of Mati Peekma as Australia's Honorary Consul in Tallinn in June 1995. Peekma still serves as honorary consul today. Australia signed a Working Holiday Visas arrangement with Estonia in May 2005. In 2007, the Estonian Government appointed Peeter Miller as the first ambassador to Australia, receiving non-resident accreditation as the residents Ambassador to Japan; Miller presented his credentials to the Governor-General of Australia, Michael Jeffery on 30 November 2007. From 2010 to 2012, the second Estonian ambassador, Andres Rundu, was resident in Tallinn. In November 2011, the Ministry of Foreign Affairs opened a Consulate-General in Sydney, headed by Consul-General Triinu Rajasalu. Consul-General Rajasalu was succeeded by Katrin Kanarik on 1 August 2013, who served until the consulate's closure in July 2016.

In July 1998 Estonian Prime Minister Mart Siimann visited Australia. An Australian Parliamentary delegation, led by the former Deputy President of the Senate, Senator Sue West, visited Tallinn in October 1999. Estonian Parliamentary delegation, led by the Speaker of Riigikogu Ene Ergma visited Australia in 2008. In 2009 Estonian Foreign Minister Urmas Paet visited Australia and opened Estonian Honorary Consulate in Perth. In April 2010 Australian Foreign Minister Stephen Smith participated in the Meeting of ISAF Foreign Ministers in Tallinn, Estonia. The President of the Senate John Hogg paid an official visit to Estonia in October 2013. The Embassy of Estonia in Canberra was opened in February 2015, with the first ambassador appointed, Andres Unga, who presented his credentials to Governor-General Quentin Bryce on 28 March 2013. In February 2016, Estonian Foreign Minister Marina Kaljurand officially opened the Estonian Embassy in Canberra, co-located with the Embassy of Finland to Australia, and held talks with various Federal Ministers.

In 2015, Australia and Estonia signed a new social security agreement. On 7 March 2018, Foreign Minister Julie Bishop announced the opening of the Australian Embassy in Estonia, which would function on a "pop-up" basis, with the new ambassador resident in Tallinn for two months of the year and the embassy having a virtual presence for the remainder of the year. In response, the Estonian Foreign Minister, Sven Mikser, noted that the new embassy "will doubtlessly make Australia more prominent in Estonia and in our region on the whole". From 1991 to 2018, Australia's relations with Estonia were the responsibility of the Australian Embassy in Stockholm. With the severe effects of the 2019–20 Australian bushfire season upon the City of Canberra, the Estonian Embassy was temporarily closed and moved to Sydney.

=== Australian Ambassadors ===
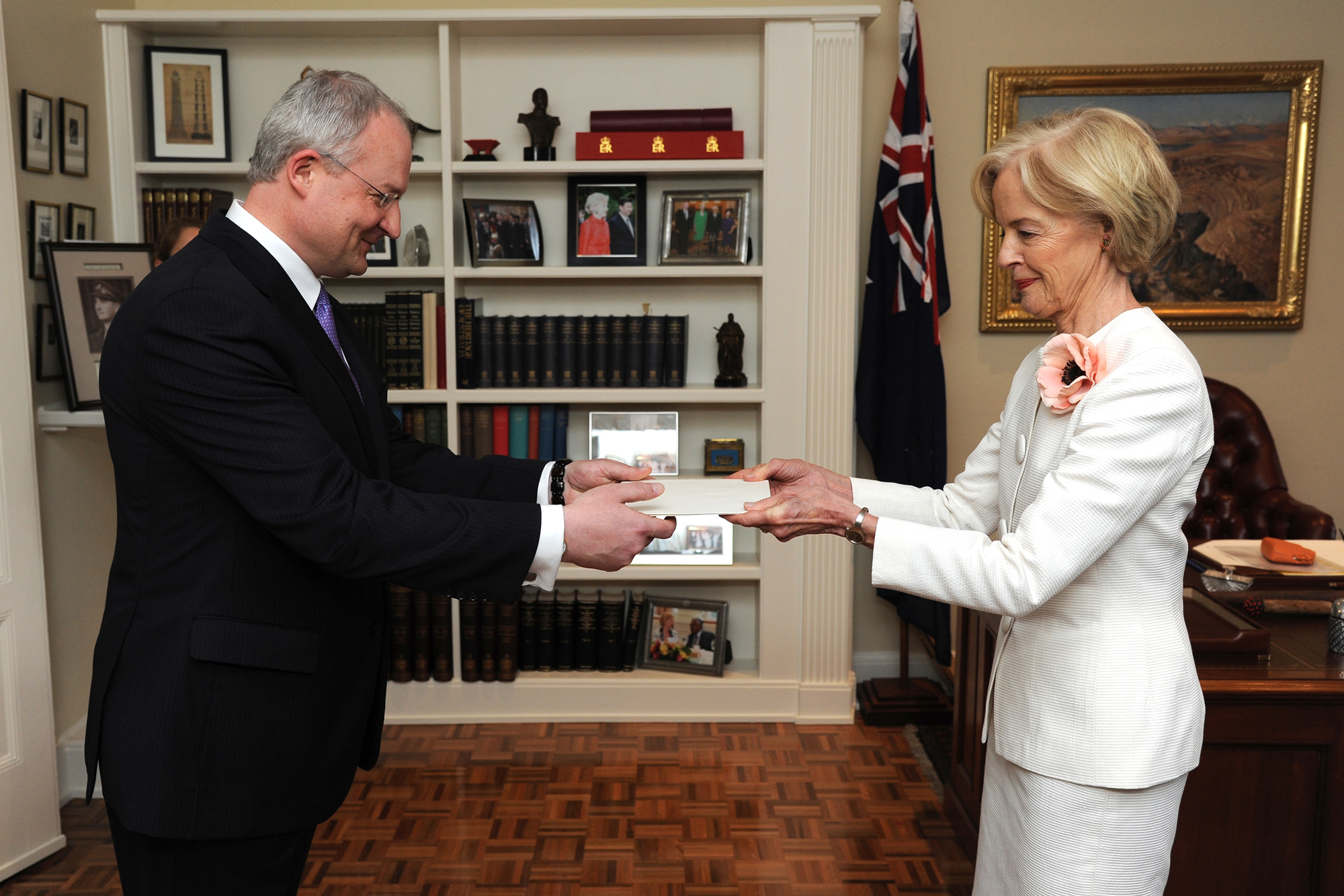
Estonian Ambassador to Australia, Andres Unga, presents his credentials to Governor General of Australia, Quentin Bryce, 28 March 2013.

=== Estonian Ambassadors ===
Name	Residency	Start of term	End of term	References
Peeter Miller	Tokyo, Japan	25 October 2007	21 June 2010	
Andres Rundu	Tallinn, Estonia	21 June 2010	30 July 2012	
Andres Unga	Tallinn, Estonia	30 July 2012	18 February 2015	
Andres Unga	Canberra, Australia	18 February 2015	26 February 2019	
Kersti Eesmaa	Canberra, Australia	7 August 2019	6 August 2024	
Jaan Reinhold	Canberra, Australia	7 August 2024	incumbent	

== Migration ==
The first Estonians settled in Australia in 1853 and the first Estonian Society was established in Melbourne in 1914. People settled primarily around Sydney. After Soviet occupation of Estonia in 1940 and again in 1944, numerous Estonian exiles settled in Australia, contributing to development of Estonian culture in Australia. Estonian Houses were set up in Sydney (1940), Thirlmere (1952), Melbourne (1955), Adelaide (1957) and Perth (1966). Australia has the fifth largest Estonian community after Russia, Canada, Sweden and the USA. Sir Arvi Parbo, chairman of three of Australia's largest companies, is one of the best-known Estonians in Australia.

Australia is host to one of the largest communities of Estonians abroad, with 13 500 people identifying as Estonian in the 2019 Australian Census. In the 2016 Australian census, over 9,500 people identified as being of Estonian ancestry.

== Cultural and educational ==
Monthly value of Australian merchandise exports to Estonia (A$ millions) since 1995

Monthly value of Estonian merchandise exports to Australia (A$ millions) since 1997

Australia has multiple arrangements with Estonia involving the Estonian Business School, Monash University and Swinburne University of Technology. Tallinn University has signed a Memorandum of Understanding with Victoria University for cooperation in youth work education.

Estonian culture has been presented in Australia by many Estonian artists and musicians, including the Estonian Philharmonic Chamber Choir and composer Arvo Pärt – honorary doctor of Sydney University. Arvo Volmer has been the principal conductor of the Adelaide Symphony Orchestra since 2004. The Estonian Archives in Sydney were established in 1952 and hold the majority of all printed Estonian works that were published outside of Estonia following World War II.

== Economic relations ==
Trade between Australia and Estonia was a modest A$ 60 million in 2013–14. Merchandise trade between Australia and Estonia has been unstable, partly due to a big distance between the countries. Estonia's biggest import are alcoholic beverages (wines) and Australia's are wood and wood products.

== Treaties ==
The following is a list of international bilateral treaties

- Early treaties were extended to Australia by the British Empire, however they are still generally in force.
- European Union treaties, extended to Estonia are not included below.

Entry into force	Topic	Title	Ref
1926	Trade	Agreement between the United Kingdom of Great Britain and Ireland (and on behalf of Australia, Canada, India, the Irish Free State, Newfoundland, New Zealand and South Africa) and Estonia regarding Tonnage Measurement of Merchant Ships, and Exchange of Notes	
1927	Extradition	Extradition Convention between the United Kingdom of Great Britain, Ireland and Estonia.	
1927	Extradition	Exchange of Notes between the Government of the United Kingdom of Great Britain and Ireland (and on behalf of Australia, New Zealand and South Africa) and the Government of Estonia extending to Certain Mandated Territories the Extradition Convention of 18 November 1925	
1933	Civil law	Convention between the United Kingdom and Estonia regarding Legal Proceedings in Civil and Commercial Matters	
1994	Trade	Agreement between the Government of Australia and the Government of the Republic of Estonia on Economic and Commercial Cooperation	

== See also ==
- Foreign relations of Australia
- Foreign relations of Estonia
- Estonian Australians
