= Australia–Norway relations =

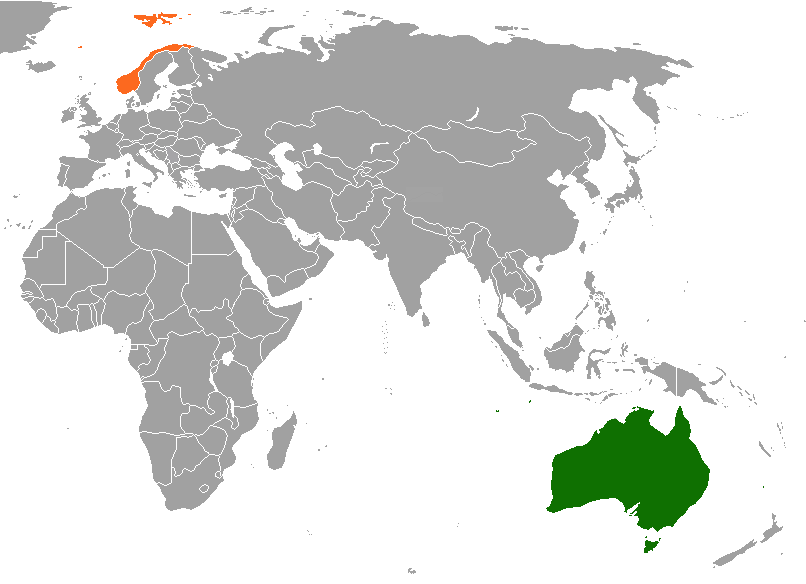

- Australia: Norway

Diplomatic mission
- Australian Embassy, Copenhagen, Denmark: Royal Norwegian Embassy, Canberra, Australia

Envoy
- Australian Ambassador to Denmark, Norway and Iceland H.E. Kerin Ayyalaraju: Norwegian Ambassador to Australia H.E. Anne Grete Riise

Diplomatic relations between the Commonwealth of Australia and the Kingdom of Norway were established in 1947.

Australia and Norway collaborate in managing matters related to Antarctica. Both countries have Territorial claims in Antarctica, and they share a mutual border at 45 degree East longitude. They also completely accept each other's territorial claims in the continent.

Australia and Norway share similar views in many matters, including human rights, international peace and order, sustainability, and open trade. The two nations’ stances on whaling issues, however, are dissimilar.

In 2001, disagreements on the MV Tampa affair resulted in intense public exchanges between the authorities of Australia and Norway.

Bilateral trade between Australia and Norway has gradually increased. The two nations have also entered into trade agreements and other affiliations.

Australia currently has no embassy in Norway; Consular services for Australia are offered at the embassy in Copenhagen, Denmark on behalf of Norway. Norway has an embassy in Canberra.

== Antarctic issues ==
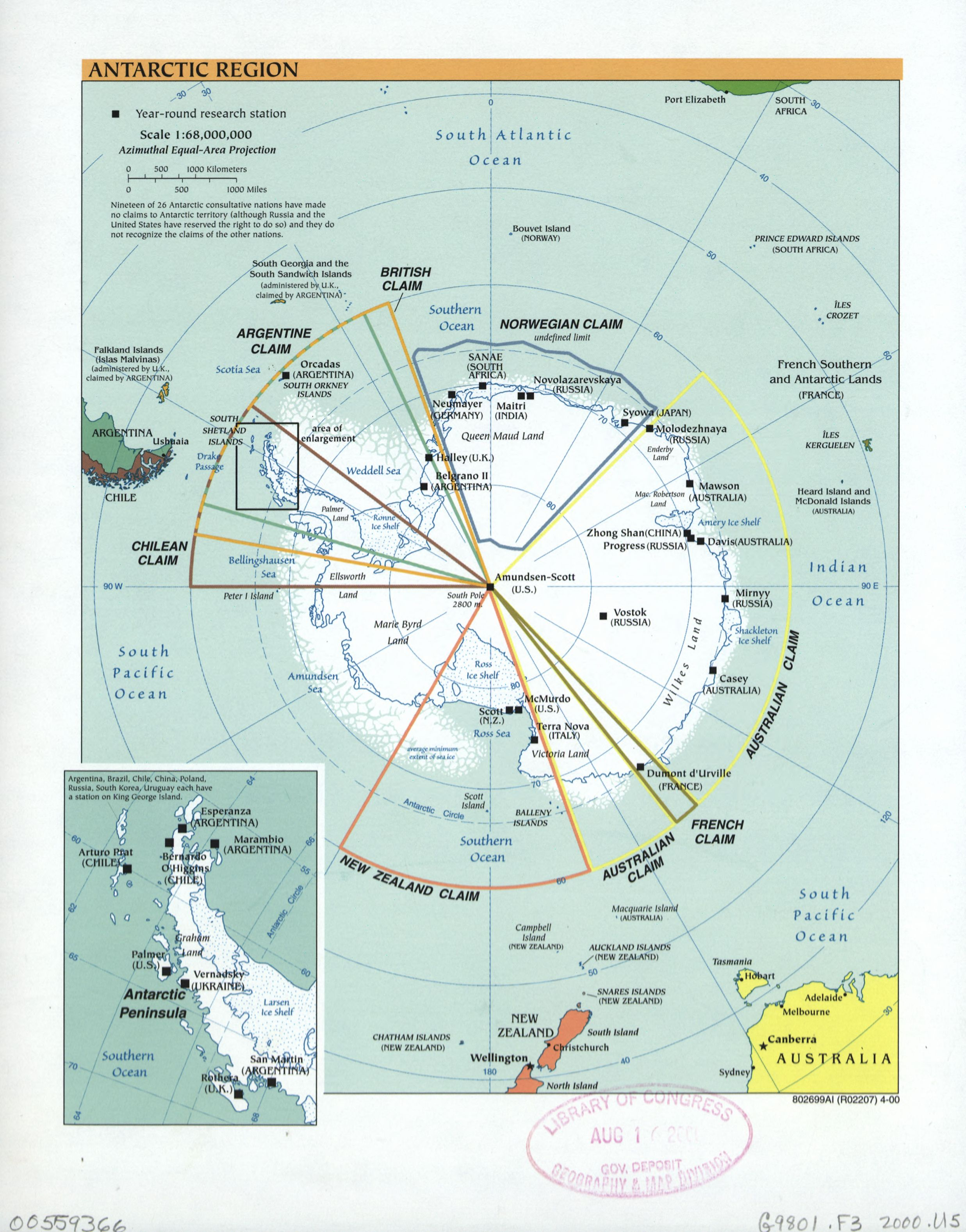
Map that shows territorial claims on Antarctica

Australia and Norway, together with New Zealand, France and the United Kingdom, are the only nations that jointly recognize the sovereignty over the territorial claims in Antarctica of each other.

Under the Antarctic Treaty, Australia, like Norway, each possesses two distinct territories in the region. Of their territories, Dronning Maud Land of Norway and Australian Antarctic Territory share a border in the east of the Norwegian territory and the west of the Australian territory at 45 degree East longitude.

The agreement about the limit between the two countries’ territories is the result of a settlement between Hjalmar Riiser-Larsen, a Norwegian captain, and Sir Douglas Mawson, who led the British Australian and New Zealand Antarctic Research Expedition (BANZARE), in January 1930.

The formal recognition of Australian annexation of the Australian Antarctic Territory by Norway was obtained on 15 January 1939 when Norway informed Britain that the limits of Australian Antarctic Territory were accepted.

== Whaling disagreements ==
Australia and Norway are members of the International Whaling Commission (IWC). Their views on the function of the IWC, however, are different. Norway is on the pro-whaling side. They maintain that the mission of the IWC is to achieve the whale stocks’ sustainability through regulation and management of whale hunting. Australia is among the anti-whaling nations. They hold the view that protecting and conserving the population of whales is the main purpose of the IWC.

Under the International Convention for the Regulation of Whaling (ICRW), which laid the groundwork for the IWC, there is a provision that gives members of the IWC the right to file an objection so that the objectors can unilaterally set their own quotas for whaling and avoid having to comply with IWC's regulations and moratorium.

Norway adopts a stance against the ban on whaling and advocates a resumption of commercial whaling. Norway has made use of the mentioned article under the ICRW. The country filed the objection to the moratorium in 1992 and resumed hunting whales for commercial purpose in 1994. Today, Norway still maintains its commercial hunting of common minke and fin whales with self-set quotas, mainly in the North Atlantic and are under no obligation to comply with any regulations or prohibitions of the IWC.

On the other hand, Australia protests any form of whaling (commercial or researching purpose) in spite of the status of whales’ population or ICRW's purpose and maintains the position that there should be an immediate end to ‘scientific’ whaling and whaling ‘under objection or reservation’. Australia is also of the opinion that there is a need for rejuvenating the ICRW to eliminate the provision that enable the IWC's members to avoid being legally bounded by the IWC's rules, which is also the article that Norway is taking advantage of.

== Dispute over the freighter MV Tampa incident ==
Norway relied on the fact that Australian authorities requested for the rescue to claim that the responsibility for the Afghans rescued must be taken by Australia. In response, Australia denied any obligation to allow entry for the rescued people arising from the conveying the mentioned request. It was Australia's expectation that the determination of the refugees’ next destination, either back to where they were from or continue to the MV Tampa’s planned destination, be done by the government of Norway.

‘Acrimonious’ public exchanges were made between Australia and Norway as a result of both countries’ continuing denials of responsibility.

Norway asserted that the conditions of the refugees on the MV Tampa were critical and the possibility of life lost was high and therefore, the MV Tampa needed to port the Australian Territory of Christmas Island. Australia, however, stated that the circumstance did not need any evacuation. Accusation was made by the Australian Prime Minister at that time that the medical situation on the freighter Tampa was exaggerated by the captain. The Prime Minister also said that nobody on the ship appeared to be in a medical emergency.

On Norwegian public radio, the Norwegian Foreign Minister stated that if a ship was considered unsafe to sail by the captain, no country was allowed to force that ship to depart into international waters. He also criticized the attitude of Australia was ‘unacceptable and inhuman’ and claimed that Australia's action was violating international law. The Norwegian government stated that it was to contact the International Maritime Organization to inform it about the act of Australia. Norway's response received criticism from the Australian Prime Minister. He claimed that the Norwegian Government's attitude is to deny all responsibility in the incident even though the vessel, its captain, and its company are all Norwegian.

Norway maintained its official view that the search and rescue was led by Australia in conformity Article 98 of UNCLOS and the MV Tampa was just a participant. Australia pointed to the fact that it was within Indonesia's appointed sea area where the search and rescue took place.

Australia defended its position that they were not required to let the Tampa reach the port of Christmas Island. Norwegian authorities replied by arguing that the decision of the captain could not be disputed by Australia as it was not within the Australian government's rights to do so. Even though the medical emergency was ambiguous, Norway asserted that the fact that the vessel was carrying 438 people when its maximum load was 40 people was adequate for the situation to be determined as distressed. To counter this argument, Australia contended that it was Norway's business to ensure safety standards being met as Norway was the MV Tampa's flag's state. Australia concluded that, therefore, Norway was responsible for the guarantee that the MV Tampa, after docking Christmas Island, would not leave the port without having first met all the safety requirements.

Australia rejected the duty of receiving the immigrants, saying that it was not in compliance with Australian immigration laws to let the rescued entry Australia when the critical conditions leading to the rescue had ceased to exist. In response, Norway's government insisted that Australia's rescue responsibilities were still remained given the then current situation. To let the rescued be disembarked at the nearest port, which was the Christmas Island in that case, was one of Australia's responsibilities. These responsibilities were also in compliance with humanitarian international standards that were widely recognized.

== Bilateral trade and investments ==
=== Trade ===
Monthly value of Norwegian merchandise exports to Australia (A$ millions) since 1988

During the period of 2015 to 2019, on average, Australia increased its exports of goods to Norway by more than 10 percent every year.

Trade between Australia and Norway is also facilitated under the regulations of several general agreements and policies, including the Australia's pact with the European Economic Area (EEA), of which Norway is a member, and the agreements within the World Trade Organization (WTO). These agreements present all the conditions, importing taxes, and levies, for the trading of merchandises and services between the two countries.

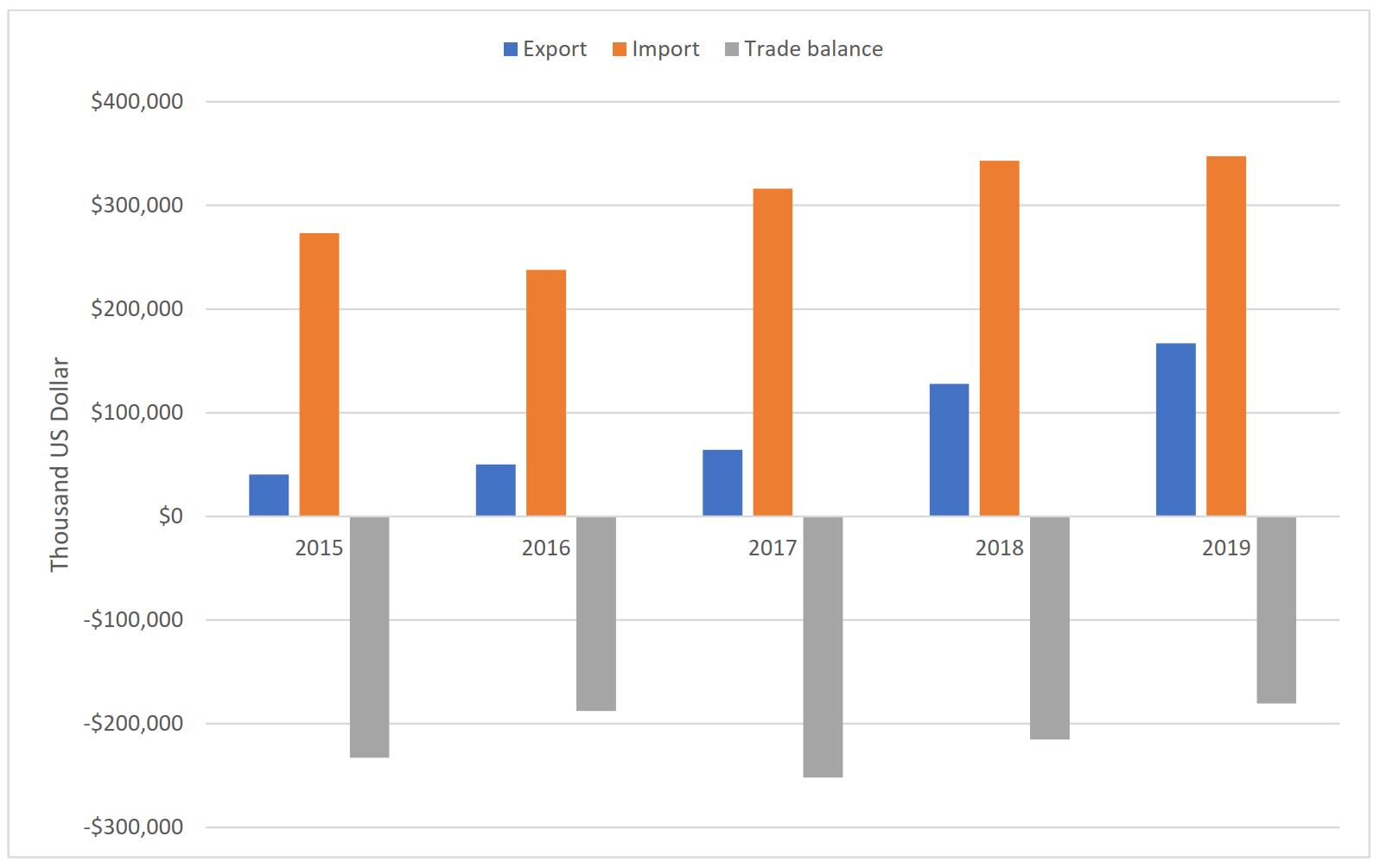
Values of goods imported and exported between Australia and Norway by year during the period 2015-2019, as reported by Australia. Data from OECD Stat

Total merchandise in US dollar imported and exported from Australia in 2019 as reported by Norway are $253,685,000 and $191,090,000, respectively.

Total merchandise in US dollar imported and exported from Norway in 2019 as reported by Australia are $347,321,000 and $157,026,000, respectively.

Monthly value of Australian merchandise exports to Norway (A$ millions) since 1988

The difference between import and export values (‘asymmetries’) in bilateral trade reported by any two countries is caused by several reasons. Firstly, in gathering the statistics for import and export, various criteria of partner attribution are applied. Secondly, in import statistics, CIF-type values are used; meanwhile, in export statistics, FOB-type values are used. Lastly, in gathering data, various trade systems may be used.

Australia's top three product categories imported from Norway, in order of monetary value, are: boats, ships, and floating structures; liquids pumps and parts; instruments for measuring and analyzing. The top three types of goods exported to Norway by Australia, in order of monetary value, include: aluminum ores; pharmaceutical products; instruments for measuring and analyzing.

In 2018, Australia was the 42nd largest import source of Norway with 0.25% of total import partner share, 30th largest export destination of Norway with 0.24% of total export partner share. Of the same period, Norway's rankings as import source and export destination of Australia were 52nd (0.15% of total import partner share) and 52nd (0.05% of total export partner share).

=== Investments ===
In 2019, the total of investments from one country to the other amounted to $35.5 billion AUD, of which Australia invested $10.2 billion to Norway and Norway invested $25.3 billion to Australia.

== Diplomatic relations ==
=== State visits ===
- February - March 2017: Tone Skogen, the former Deputy Minister for Foreign Affairs of Norway, visited Australia
- 23–27 February 2015: Norwegian King Harald V and Queen Sonja visited Canberra, Sydney, and Perth. High-level politicians and business leaders accompanied the king and queen during the visit.

=== Agreements and arrangements between Australia and Norway ===
Australia and Norway have come under these specific agreements:

- 2007: Agreement on Social Security
- 2007: Double Taxation Agreement
- 2004: Agreement on Medical Treatment for Temporary Visitors’’

=== Other affiliations ===
The two countries work closely as parts of the Umbrella Group, a loosely organized negotiation group first established by, beside Australia and Norway, other developed countries that also depends on various types of fossil fuel. The formation of the Umbrella group materialized right after the Kyoto Protocol was approved.

During the conclusion of the Kyoto Protocol in 1997, Australia and Norway are two of the three nations joining the Protocol's Annex B. The countries in this Annex aims to obtain additional emissions allowed for 2008-2012, the earliest commitment period, through negotiation. Australia and Norway conducted negotiations to increase eight per cent and one percent in emissions from the 1990 index, respectively. After delaying for some time, Norway joined Australia for the agreement to commit to the Kyoto Protocol's subsequent commitment period. The two countries also gave the flexibility mechanisms of the Protocol strong endorsement.

== Australia - Norway statistics ==
- Australian living in Norway: 1,665 people
- Norwegian immigrants in Australia: 4,190 people

== Resident diplomatic missions ==
- Australia is accredited to Norway from its embassy in Copenhagen, Denmark.
- Norway has an embassy in Canberra.

== See also ==
- Foreign relations of Australia
- Foreign relations of Norway
- Queen Maud Land
- Australian Antarctic Territory
- Norwegian Australians
