= Australia–Latvia relations =

International relations between Australia and Latvia

- Australia: Latvia

Diplomatic mission
- Embassy of Australia, Stockholm: Embassy of Latvia, Canberra

Envoy
- Ambassador: Ambassador

Foreign relations exist between Australia and Latvia. Australia first recognised Latvia on 22 September 1921 and was among the first countries to re-recognise Latvia's independence on 27 August 1991. Both countries re-established diplomatic relations on 21 November 1991. Australia is represented in Latvia through its embassy in Stockholm, Sweden (since 1997) and an honorary consulate in Riga (since 1995). Latvia has had an embassy in Canberra since October 2021, and also has honorary consulates in Sydney, Brisbane, Adelaide, Melbourne and Perth.

== History ==
Early diplomatic representation of Latvia as part of the Russian Empire (within the Governorates of Livonia, Courland, and Vitebsk) in Australia dates back to 1894, when the Ministry of Foreign Affairs of the Russian Empire sent its first permanent consular representatives to Australia, based in Melbourne, and Latvians were counted in official statistics as part of the Russian community.

Following the Latvian Declaration of Independence in 1918, from 1919 to 1921, Latvia and also Estonia were represented in Australia by the Finnish Consul in Sydney, Harald Tanner, with Finland being another country that had emerged from the dissolution of the Russian Empire. On 1 September 1921, formal relations between the two countries began when the Governor General of Australia recognised the appointment Carl Michael Alksne as the Consular Agent of the Republic of Latvia in Sydney, succeeding Consul Tanner, and Australia recognised Latvia on its admission to the League of Nations on 22 September 1921. Alksne was succeeded as Consul by J. Rosing in April 1923, who later resigned his appointment in October 1923, with Alksne resuming office as Consular Agent.

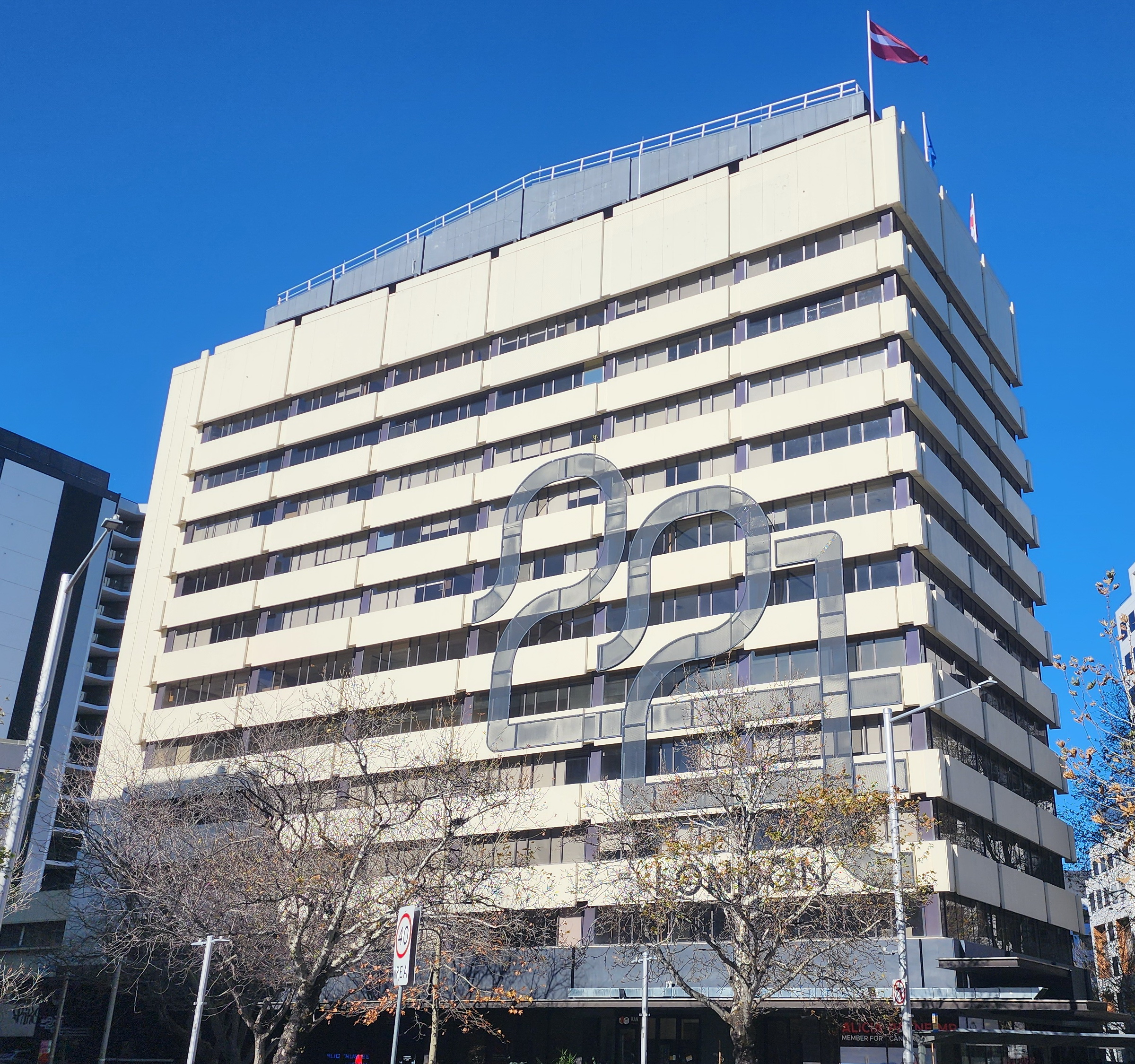
Embassy of Latvia in Canberra at 22 London Circuit

In August 1928, the Latvian Government appointed the Consul-General in London, Charles Louis Seya, to have responsibility for relations with Australia while resident in London. Seya was succeeded by Kārlis Reinholds Zariņš in October 1934. Latvian honorary consulates were also opened in Adelaide and Brisbane, with the appointment of Charles Seymour Toms in October 1928, and Frederick William Sabine in March 1929, respectively. In July 1931, Robert Galbraith McComas was appointed Honorary Consul of Latvia in Melbourne. In September 1931, Norman McLeod was appointed Honorary Consul for Latvia in Sydney. In July 1936 McLeod became the first Australian to be awarded the rank of Commander of the Order of the Three Stars by the President of Latvia, Kārlis Ulmanis. In May 1937, Sabine was succeeded by Reginald Temple Stephens as the Latvian consul in Brisbane, holding office until his death in 1952.

=== Relations during the Soviet occupation ===
With the Soviet Occupation of the Baltic States in June 1940, the Australian Government of Robert Menzies, like the British Government, did not recognise this action but the Minister for External Affairs, Sir Frederick Stewart, later confirmed in June 1941 that informal discussions had occurred that implied a "readiness on the part of the United Kingdom Government to settle on a practical basis various questions arising out of the Soviet annexation of the Baltic States." However, the resident Latvian consulates in Australia continued to operate under the direction of the Latvian diplomatic service in exile. In 1948, the Soviet Embassy in Canberra made the announcement that "all persons from the Baltic States now resident in Australia would be registered as Soviet citizens", which met the response from the Australian Government of Ben Chifley that Australia did not recognise the Soviet annexation of the Baltic States and any citizens of those states resident in Australia would not be compelled to undertake any action in this regard.

By March 1949, in a Senate debate on the United Nations General Assembly's Third Session, the Minister for Health and Social Services, Senator Nick McKenna, noted the status quo of the situation:

"The Australian Government has not recognised, and does not intend to recognise, the absorption into the Soviet Union of the formerly independent republics of Latvia, Lithuania, and Estonia. The Australian Government believes that these accessions by the Soviet Union cannot be said to have been made as a result of the clearly expressed wish of the people of those countries. I draw the attention of the Senate to the action of the Minister for Immigration (Mr. Calwell) some time ago when a request was made on behalf of Soviet Russia that nationals of those countries should register in Australia as members of the Soviet Republic. The Senate will recall that an announcement was made that they were under no obligation to do that, and that if they cared to do so it would be of their own volition and not as the result of any pressure on the part of this Government or of any obligation the Australian Government felt was cast upon them. However, the absorption of those countries by Soviet Russia is an accomplished fact. I doubt whether this or any other Government could take action that would result in a change being effected in the foreseeable future."

In March 1970 the Minister for External Affairs in the Gorton Government, William McMahon, noted in Parliament: "The legal position is that Australia has never withdrawn recognition from the Governments of Estonia, Latvia, and Lithuania which were forced into exile by the U.S.S.R.'s invasion and occupation of those States in 1940. Australia has not explicitly extended recognition to any particular Government which may regard itself as a successor to one of those Governments which Australia recognised in 1940." Australia was the only Western country to break ranks and briefly recognise the Soviet annexation of Latvia (and the other Baltic states) as de jure for 17 months between July 1974 to December 1975 by the Whitlam Labor government, while most other countries continued to recognise the independent Latvian diplomatic missions. This change of position in variance to the majority of Australia's international allies was characterised as a betrayal by the Latvian community. In explaining the change of position, the Minister for Repatriation and Compensation and prominent critic of Soviet foreign policy, Senator John Wheeldon, noted to the Senate in September 1974:

"What is the situation with regard to Lithuania, Latvia and Estonia which are or were three of the Baltic states? Their incorporation in the Soviet Union is one of the most shameful acts in modern European history. It was something which took place as a result of a disgraceful, shameful and discreditable treaty signed in Moscow in 1939 between Stalin and Ribbentrop, the then nazi Foreign Minister. [...] At the present time one of the most important problems facing the whole of the world's people is to bring about what for some mysterious reason - I have never quite known why - is called détente, a relaxation, an end to the cold war, a certain amount of give and take by the two major sides in the present world conflict. One of the things that has to be done in order to bring that about is to face a number of realities and some of those realities are unpalatable. There has to be some recognition of the fact that whether we like it or not or anyone else likes it or not, or whether it is just or unjust- and I believe it is unjust and I do not like it - Latvia, Lithuania and Estonia have been incorporated into the Soviet Union. To continue to say they are not part of the Soviet Union while the Soviet Government and I daresay a majority of the Soviet people believe that they are is something which lessens opportunities for bringing about peaceful settlements with the Soviet Union, and peaceful settlements with the Soviet Union are essential."

Following the election of the new conservative Coalition government of Malcolm Fraser in November 1975, the new government withdrew de jure recognition of the incorporation of Latvia into the Soviet Union. On 17 December of that year the Australian government instructed the Australian ambassador in Moscow that he and his staff were not to make any official visits to the Latvian SSR. Independent Latvian consular representatives continued to be maintained until the restoration of independence in 1991. On 27 August 1991, Prime Minister Bob Hawke, announced Australia's decision to re-establish full diplomatic relations with Latvia. The Australian Ambassador to Denmark, John Burgess, received non-resident accreditation as Australia's first Ambassador to Latvia from 1991.

=== Relations after 1991 ===
As part of a significant expansion of Australian Honorary Consulates, acting Foreign Minister Bob McMullan announced the appointment of Latvian-Australian businessman, Valdis Berzins, as Australia's first honorary consul in Riga, Latvia, in October 1995. When the new government of Prime Minister John Howard cut the budget of the Department of Foreign Affairs and Trade in 1996–97, forcing the closure of the embassy in Copenhagen, Denmark, in May 1997, accreditation for Denmark, Iceland, Latvia, and Lithuania, was transferred to the embassy in Sweden, which remains responsible for Australia's relations with Latvia today.

Australian Parliamentary delegations undertook official visits to Latvia on 4-7 September 1994, and 24-28 September 2003. In November 1993, the Minister of Foreign Affairs of Latvia, Georgs Andrejevs, visited Australia and signed a treaty on trade and economic cooperation with Australian Foreign Minister, Gareth Evans. An extradition treaty between Australia and Latvia was signed in Riga on 14 July 2000 by Australian Ambassador Stephen Brady and Latvian Justice Minister, Ingrīda Labucka.

In September 2011, the Australian Prime Minister's Special Envoy, Russell Trood, visited Latvia and signed a social security agreement with the Latvian Minister for Welfare, Ilona Jursevska. In June 2015, the Latvian Minister of Foreign Affairs, Edgars Rinkēvičs undertook an official visit to Australia. Rinkēvičs undertook another official visit to Australia in August 2022, when he officially opened the new Latvian Embassy in Canberra.

=== Latvian ambassadors ===
Name	Residency	Start of term	End of term	References
Indulis Bērziņš	London, United Kingdom	March 2007	November 2013	
Andris Teikmanis	London, United Kingdom	November 2013	2016	
Dace Treija-Masī	Tokyo, Japan	2016	October 2021	
Marģers Krams	Canberra, Australia	October 2021	present	

== Migration ==
The first Russian ship to anchor in Sydney in 1807 was captained by Ludwig von Hagemeister, a Latvian of the Baltic German nobility who was born in 1780 in Drostenhof (now known as Drusti). Sydney's first Latvian-born resident was a Jewish convict from Riga transported to Sydney in 1829, Aaron Woolf, while seaman Krišsjānis Lūks was the first recorded ethnic Latvian to settle in Sydney in the 1850s, with the majority of early Latvian connections to Australia being connected to maritime trade. The Lettish Association of Sydney was established in the home of Jānis Ieviņš at 30A Argyle Place in Millers Point in 1913, with a membership of 36 by 1915.

The occupation of Latvia from 1940 and the end of the war in Europe in 1945, resulted in a significant influx of refugees from the Baltic states to Australia. Between 1947 and 1952, approximately 19,700 Latvian refugees arrived in Australia as displaced persons under the supervision of the International Refugee Organization. The first voyage under Arthur Calwell's Displaced Persons immigration program, was that of the General Stuart Heintzelman in 1947. Of the 843 immigrants on the Heintzelman, 264 were Latvian.

In 1947 the Australian Latvian Welfare Organisation was established, which was later replaced by the Sydney Latvian Society in 1952. The Sydney Latvian Society acquired land in Parnell Street, Strathfield in 1953 for the establishment of a community centre and hall for the Latvian diaspora in Sydney, with Latvian House officially opened on 18 November 1959.

Australia is host to one of the largest communities of Latvians abroad, with 3,126 people having Latvia as their country of origin, and 23,233 people identified as being of Latvian ancestry, in the 2021 Australian Census.

== Economic ==
Trade between Australia and Estonia was a modest A$78.2 million in 2019–20. Merchandise trade between Australia and Latvia has been unstable, partly due to a big distance between the countries. Latvia's biggest imports are alcoholic beverages and vehicle parts/accessories, and Australia's are refined petroleum and telecom equipment/parts.

== Resident diplomatic missions ==
- Australia is accredited to Latvia from its embassy in Stockholm, Sweden.
- Latvia has an embassy in Canberra.

== See also ==
- Foreign relations of Australia
- Foreign relations of Latvia
- Latvian Australians
