= Embassy of Estonia, Canberra =

Diplomatic mission of Estonia to Australia

Estonian Embassy in Canberra
- Location: Yarralumla, Canberra
- Address: 12 Darwin Avenue, Yarralumla ACT 2600, Australia
- Coordinates: 35.303093°S 149.115901°E
- Ambassador: Jaan Reinhold
- Website: Official website

Embassy of Estonia in Canberra is Estonia's diplomatic mission to Australia and New Zealand.

== History ==
Australia first recognized Estonia on September 22, 1921, after Estonia's acceptance into the League of Nations. From 1919 to 1935, Estonia's interests in Australia were represented by the Finnish Consulate (in 1922 Harold Tanner, a Finn, was named Deputy Honorary Consul in Sydney). In 1935 Estonia appointed its own honorary consul. The work of the consulate was interrupted in 1940 and its records were given to the Swedish Consulate for storage (today they have been returned to Estonia).

Australia was among the first countries to re-recognize Estonia's independence on August 27, 1991, while diplomatic relations were restored on November 21, 1991.

The first Ambassador of Estonia to Australia, Peeter Miller, was accredited from Tokyo (Japan) in 2007. In 2010 the accreditation was transferred to Tallinn.

In 2011, Estonia opened a Consulate General in Sydney. It was closed in 2015 when the Embassy of Estonia was established in Canberra. The Embassy was officially announced open on February 18, 2015.

== Location ==
Since August 4, 2015 the Embassy of Estonia operates in the premises of the Embassy of Finland in Canberra. The embassy is located at Darwin Avenue in Yarralumla, ACT, Australia.

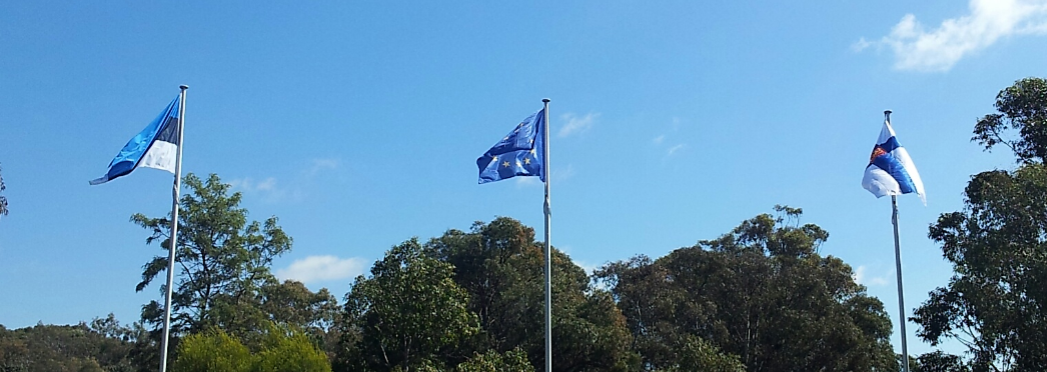
Flags of Estonia, EU and Finland

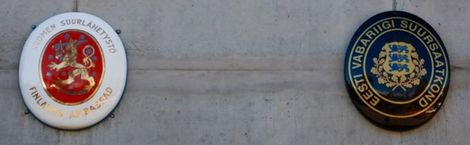

== Estonian Ambassadors to Australia ==
History of Estonian Ambassadors to Australia
Name	Residing city	Credentials	Service
Peeter Miller	Tokyo	30 November 2007	2007 - 2010
Andres Rundu	Tallinn	---	2010 - 2012
Andres Unga	Tallinn	28 March 2013	2012 - 2015
Andres Unga	Canberra	28 March 2013	2015 - 2019
Kersti Eesmaa	Canberra	7 August 2019	2019 - 7 August 2024
Jaan Reinhold	Canberra	7 August 2024	2024 - Incumbent

== Honorary Consuls ==
Estonia has 4 Honorary Consuls in Australia (Adelaide, Brisbane, Hobart, Perth) and 1 Honorary Consul in New Zealand (Wellington).

== See also ==
- Australia-Estonia relations
