= Australia–Lithuania relations =

International relations between Australia and Lithuania

- Australia: Lithuania

Diplomatic mission
- Embassy of Australia, Warsaw: Embassy of Lithuania, Canberra

Envoy
- Ambassador Lloyd Brodrick: Ambassador Darius Degutis

Foreign relations exist between Australia and Lithuania. Australia was among the first countries to re-recognise Lithuania's independence on 27 August 1991. Both countries formally established diplomatic relations on 6 November 1991. Australia is represented in Lithuania through its embassy in Warsaw, Poland (since 2013). Lithuania has had an embassy in Canberra since 2021.

== History ==
Early diplomatic representation of Lithuania as part of the Russian Empire (within the Governorates of Vilna and Grodno) in Australia dates back to 1894, when the Ministry of Foreign Affairs of the Russian Empire sent its first permanent consular representatives to Australia, based in Melbourne, and Lithuanians were counted in official statistics as part of the Russian community.

Following the Lithuanian Declaration of Independence in 1918, Australia recognised Lithuania on its admission to the League of Nations on 22 September 1921. However, unlike the other Baltic republics of Estonia and Latvia, Lithuania did not appoint any consular representatives to Australia prior to the Soviet occupation of Lithuania in 1940.

=== Relations during the Soviet occupation ===
With the Soviet Occupation of the Baltic States in June 1940, the Australian Government of Robert Menzies, like the British Government, did not recognise this action but the Minister for External Affairs, Sir Frederick Stewart, later confirmed in June 1941 that informal discussions had occurred that implied a "readiness on the part of the United Kingdom Government to settle on a practical basis various questions arising out of the Soviet annexation of the Baltic States." Australian prisoners of war were among Allied POWs held by the Germans in the Stalag Luft VI POW camp in German-occupied Lithuania. In 1948, the Soviet Embassy in Canberra made the announcement that "all persons from the Baltic States now resident in Australia would be registered as Soviet citizens", which met the response from the Australian Government of Ben Chifley that Australia did not recognise the Soviet annexation of the Baltic States and any citizens of those states resident in Australia would not be compelled to undertake any action in this regard.

By March 1949, in a Senate debate on the United Nations General Assembly's Third Session, the Minister for Health and Social Services, Senator Nick McKenna, noted the status quo of the situation:

"The Australian Government has not recognised, and does not intend to recognise, the absorption into the Soviet Union of the formerly independent republics of Latvia, Lithuania, and Estonia. The Australian Government believes that these accessions by the Soviet Union cannot be said to have been made as a result of the clearly expressed wish of the people of those countries. I draw the attention of the Senate to the action of the Minister for Immigration (Mr. Calwell) some time ago when a request was made on behalf of Soviet Russia that nationals of those countries should register in Australia as members of the Soviet Republic. The Senate will recall that an announcement was made that they were under no obligation to do that, and that if they cared to do so it would be of their own volition and not as the result of any pressure on the part of this Government or of any obligation the Australian Government felt was cast upon them. However, the absorption of those countries by Soviet Russia is an accomplished fact. I doubt whether this or any other Government could take action that would result in a change being effected in the foreseeable future."

In March 1970, the Minister for External Affairs in the Gorton Government, William McMahon, noted in Parliament: "The legal position is that Australia has never withdrawn recognition from the Governments of Estonia, Latvia, and Lithuania which were forced into exile by the U.S.S.R.'s invasion and occupation of those States in 1940. Australia has not explicitly extended recognition to any particular Government which may regard itself as a successor to one of those Governments which Australia recognised in 1940." Australia was the only Western country to break ranks and briefly recognise the Soviet annexation of Lithuania (and the other Baltic states) as de jure for 17 months between July 1974 to December 1975 by the Whitlam Labor government, while most other countries continued to recognise the independent Lithuanian diplomatic missions. In explaining the change of position, the Minister for Repatriation and Compensation and prominent critic of Soviet foreign policy, Senator John Wheeldon, noted to the Senate in September 1974:

"What is the situation with regard to Lithuania, Latvia and Estonia which are or were three of the Baltic states? Their incorporation in the Soviet Union is one of the most shameful acts in modern European history. It was something which took place as a result of a disgraceful, shameful and discreditable treaty signed in Moscow in 1939 between Stalin and Ribbentrop, the then nazi Foreign Minister. [...] At the present time one of the most important problems facing the whole of the world's people is to bring about what for some mysterious reason - I have never quite known why - is called détente, a relaxation, an end to the cold war, a certain amount of give and take by the two major sides in the present world conflict. One of the things that has to be done in order to bring that about is to face a number of realities and some of those realities are unpalatable. There has to be some recognition of the fact that whether we like it or not or anyone else likes it or not, or whether it is just or unjust- and I believe it is unjust and I do not like it - Latvia, Lithuania and Estonia have been incorporated into the Soviet Union. To continue to say they are not part of the Soviet Union while the Soviet Government and I daresay a majority of the Soviet people believe that they are is something which lessens opportunities for bringing about peaceful settlements with the Soviet Union, and peaceful settlements with the Soviet Union are essential."

Following the election of the new conservative Coalition government of Malcolm Fraser in November 1975, the new government withdrew de jure recognition of the incorporation of Lithuania into the Soviet Union. On 17 December of that year the Australian government instructed the Australian ambassador in Moscow that he and his staff were not to make any official visits to the Lithuanian SSR. On 27 August 1991, Prime Minister Bob Hawke, announced Australia's decision to re-establish full diplomatic relations with Lithuania. The Australian Ambassador to Denmark, John Burgess, received non-resident accreditation as Australia's first Ambassador to Lithuania from 6 November 1991.

=== Relations after 1991 ===
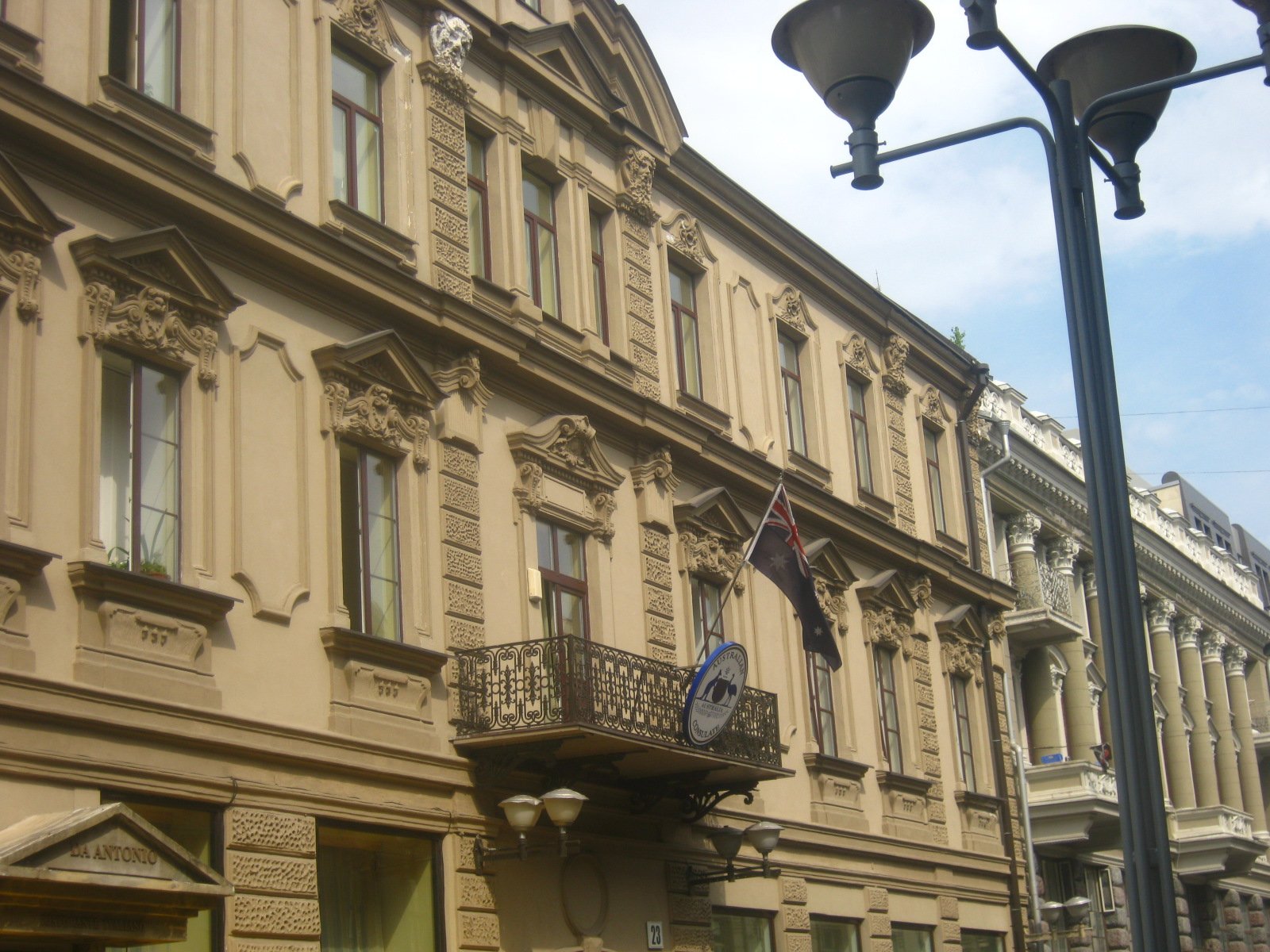
The Australian Consulate in Vilnius, Lithuania.

On 13 November 1997, as part of a significant expansion of Australian Honorary Consulates, Foreign Minister Alexander Downer announced the appointment of Italian-Australian businessman who had been resident in Lithuania since 1991, Salvatore Antonio Meschino, as Australia's first honorary consul in Vilnius, Lithuania. When the new government of Prime Minister John Howard cut the budget of the Department of Foreign Affairs and Trade in 1996–97, forcing the closure of the embassy in Copenhagen, Denmark, in May 1997, accreditation for Denmark, Iceland, Latvia, and Lithuania, was transferred to the embassy in Sweden. In 2013, responsibility for relations with Lithuania was transferred to the Ambassador to Poland.

In February 2021, the Lithuanian Government established a resident Embassy to Australia in Canberra, replacing the previous arrangement of non-resident ambassadors of Lithuania to Japan. In August 2021, the first resident ambassador of Lithuania to Australia, Darius Degutis, was appointed. He presented his credentials to the Governor-General of Australia on 30 November 2021. In February 2022, the Lithuanian Foreign Minister, Gabrielius Landsbergis, undertook an official visit to Australia and officially opened the new Lithuanian embassy. On 17–20 October 2023, the President of Lithuania, Gitanas Nausėda, undertook a state visit to Australia, including opening the Lithuania-Australia Business and Science Forum in Melbourne, and meeting with Governor-General David Hurley, Prime Minister Anthony Albanese, and the Premier of South Australia, Peter Malinauskas, who is of Lithuanian descent.

=== Lithuanian ambassadors ===
Name	Residency	Start of term	End of term	References
Dainius Kamaitis	Tokyo, Japan	2008	2011	
Albertas Algirdas Dambrauskas	Tokyo, Japan	2011	2012	
Egidijus Meilūnas	Tokyo, Japan	2012	2017	
Gediminas Varvuolis	Tokyo, Japan	2017	2021	
Darius Degutis	Canberra, Australia	1 October 2021	date	

== Migration ==
Year	2016	2020	2021	2022
Australian citizens resident in Lithuania	19	43	55	62

Year	2013	2021
Lithuanian citizens resident in Australia	650	551

The first Lithuanians came to Australia after the suppression of the November Uprising of 1830–1831, with small groups engaged in the manufacturing industry. In 1929 the Australian Lithuanian Society was founded in Sydney and by 1933, it had approximately 100 members. In 1939 approximately 1,000 Lithuanians lived in Australia. In 1950 the Australian Lithuanian Society was replaced by the Australian Lithuanian Community (Australijos Lietuvių Bendruomenė – ALB).

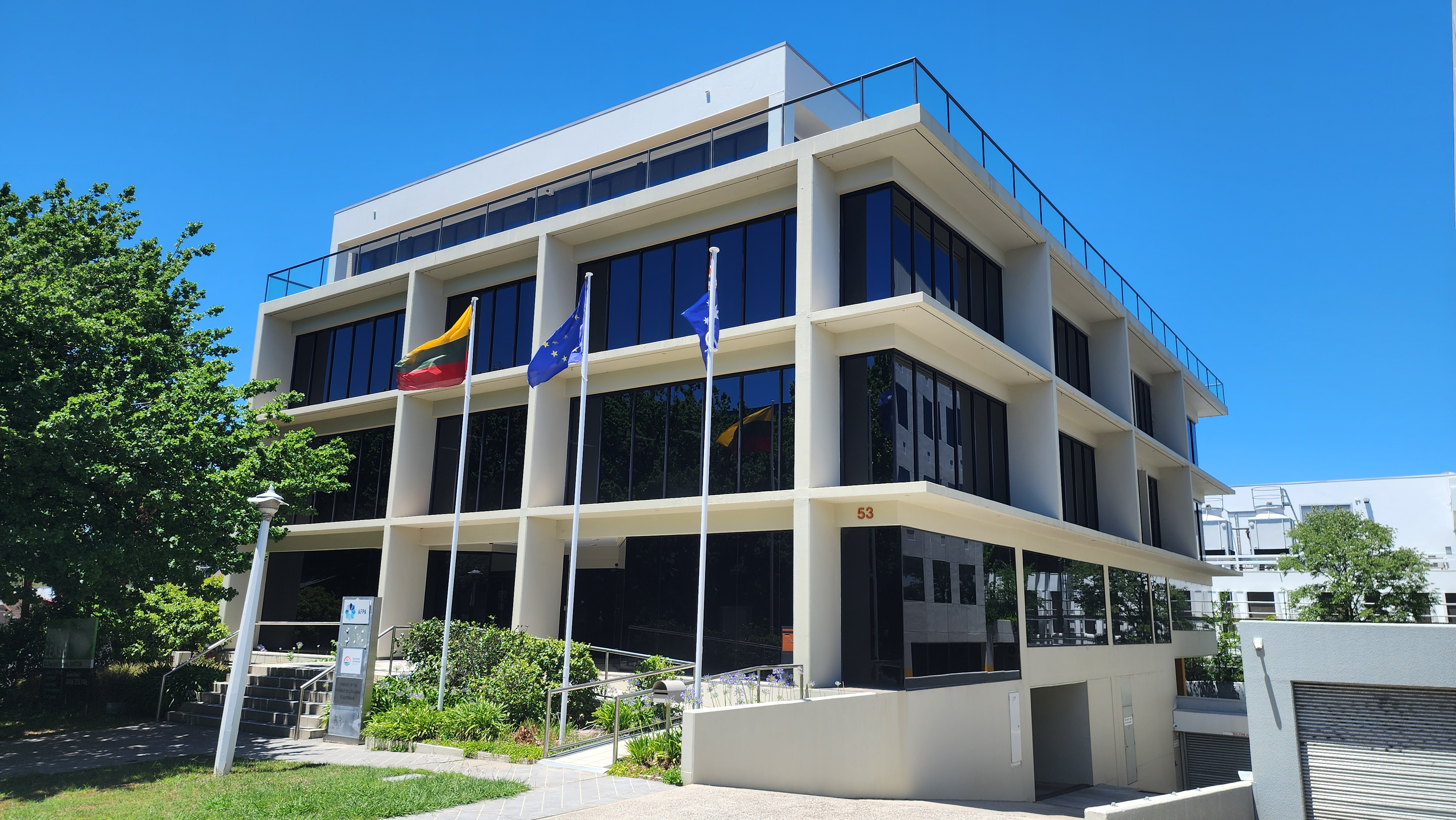
Embassy of Lithuania in Canberra

The occupation of Lithuania from 1940 and the end of the war in Europe in 1945, resulted in a significant influx of refugees to Australia. Between 1947 and 1952, approximately 10,000 Lithuanian refugees arrived in Australia as displaced persons under the supervision of the International Refugee Organization. The first voyage under Arthur Calwell's Displaced Persons immigration program, was that of the General Stuart Heintzelman in 1947. Of the 843 immigrants on the Heintzelman, 439 were Lithuanian.

Australia is host to one of the largest communities of Lithuanians abroad, with 2,582 people having Lithuania as their country of origin, and 19,430 people identified as being of Lithuanian ancestry, in the 2021 Australian Census.

== Economic ==
Total bilateral trade between Australia and Lithuania was a modest EUR€117.25 million (AUD$168.857 million) in 2021. In 2020, Australia had $12 million in foreign direct investment in Lithuania. Merchandise trade between Australia and Lithuania has been unstable, partly due to the large distance between the countries. Lithuania's biggest imports are education-related/recreational travel, animal feed, and computer parts/accessories, and Australia's are fertilisers, refined petroleum, and miscellaneous chemical products.

== Resident diplomatic missions ==
- Australia is accredited to Lithuania from its embassy in Warsaw, Poland.
- Lithuania has an embassy in Canberra.

== See also ==
- Foreign relations of Australia
- Foreign relations of Lithuania
- Lithuanian Australians
