= Robert Merrillees =

Australian diplomat and archaeologist

Robert Merrillees FAHA
- Born: 25 July 1938 (age 88)
- Education: University of Sydney (BA); University of London (PhD)
- Occupations: Diplomat, archaeologist, author
- Spouse: Parvine Helen Merrillees
- Children: Antoinette and Dolla
- Parent(s): Edna Merrillees, John Merrillees

Robert S. Merrillees FAHA (born 25 July 1938) is a former Australian diplomat and archaeologist. His memoir Diplomatic Digs was released in 2012 as an e-book.

Merrillees joined the Australian Public Service in the Department of External Affairs in 1964.

In the early 1970s, Merrillees, along with his wife and their two daughters, took part in the Columbia University Expedition to Phlamoudhi, Cyprus, led by Edith Porada. Reminiscing about the two seasons of excavations that the family took part in, Merrillees described the experience as "unforgettable", leaving them with "a sense of achievement, lasting friendships and a nostalgia for times past".

Merrillees first ambassadorial appointment was in 1983, in Tel Aviv where he was Australian Ambassador to Israel until 1987.

In February 1990, Merrillees led a team to Cambodia to hold talks with Phnom Penh government officials in preparation for a peace agreement. The next month Merrillees travelled to Washington, New York, Canada and Paris to continue discussions on a Cambodian settlement.

In October 1991, Merrillees took up an appointment as Australian Ambassador to Sweden; and non-resident Ambassador to Finland. His appointment lasted until 1995, when he was appointed Australian Ambassador to Greece. Beginning his posting to Athens in January 1996, Merrillees was recalled early from the role, in 1998, and took early retirement.

Merrillees was elected a Corresponding Fellow of the Australian Academy of the Humanities in 1992.

== Family ==
Merrillees's elder daughter, Antoinette, also joined the Australian Department of Foreign Affairs and in 2016 was Chargé d'affaires in Berlin. She is married to Australia's Permanent Representative to the United Nations, James Larsen, former Australian Ambassador to Israel and to Turkey. They have three children together: Robert, Isobel and Alexandra.

Merrillees's younger daughter Dolla Merrillees until recently was the Director of the Museum of Applied Arts and Sciences, Powerhouse Museum, Sydney Observatory and Museums Discovery Centre in Sydney. She is also the author of the book, The Woodcutter's Wife: A Stepmother's Tale, the story of her struggles in becoming a stepmother.

== Works ==
- Diplomatic Digs, Echo Books, 2012
- Living with Egypt's Past in Australia, Museum of Victoria, 1990, ISBN 9780724196739

Diplomatic posts
Preceded by David Goss	Australian Ambassador to Israel; 1983 – 1987	Succeeded by John Campbell
Preceded by Ian Nicholson	Australian Ambassador to Sweden; Australian Ambassador to Finland; Australian Ambassador to Estonia; 1991 – 1995	Succeeded by Judith Pead
Preceded by Alan Edwards	Australian Ambassador to Greece; 1996 – 1998	Succeeded by Ross Burns
