= Thomas Rann =

Thomas Rann (born 10 December in Adelaide) is an Australian cellist.

== Early life and education ==
Thomas Rann commenced his cello studies at the age of 9 studying with Ruth Saffir and Niall Brown at the Elder Conservatorium of Music. He relocated to London in 2000 to study under cellist Raphael Wallfisch at the Guildhall School of Music and Drama and has since been under the mentorship of Israeli pedagogue Uzi Wiesel.

== Career ==
Thomas Rann has performed as soloist with the Adelaide Symphony Orchestra, the Melbourne Symphony Orchestra and the Queensland Orchestra amongst others and as recitalist and chamber musician at the Schleswig-Holstein Musik Festival and Verbier Festival.

His awards include the 2003 Tait Memorial Trust award, 2004 Muriel Taylor Scholarship in London (former winners include Raphael Wallfisch, Steven Isserlis and Alexander Baillie), the Hattori Foundation Award and the Ernest Llewellyn Memorial Scholarship for string players. In 2008 Thomas Rann made his Wigmore Hall debut with pianist Wu Qian.
