= Teichmann =

Teichmann or Teichman is a surname of German or Silesian origin (German: Teich, lit. 'pond').

Notable people with the surname Teichmann include:

- Axel Teichmann (born 1979), German cross-country skier
- Ernst Teichmann (1869–1919), German theologian and zoologist
- Gary Teichmann (born 1967), South African rugby union player
- Jil Teichmann (born 1997), Spanish-born Swiss tennis player
- Josef Teichmann (born 1972), Austrian mathematician
- Karl Teichmann (1897–1927), First World War flying ace
- Ludwik Teichmann (1823–1895), Polish anatomist
- Max Teichmann (1924–2008), Australian academic and political commentator
- Richard Teichmann (1868–1925), German chess player
- Roland Teichmann, director of the Österreichisches Filminstitut

Notable people with the surname Teichman include:

- Arved von Teichman und Logischen (1829–1898), Royal Prussian lieutenant general
- Arthur Murray (born Moses Teichman, 1895–1991), dance instructor and businessman
- Eric Teichman (1884–1944), British politician
- Jenny Teichman (1930–2018), Australian/British philosopher, wife of Max Teichmann
- Sabina Teichman (1905–1983), American painter
