= Sitta =

Sitta may refer to:

- Nuthatch, a genus, Sitta, of small passerine birds belonging to the family Sittidae
- Sihah Sitta, the six canonical hadith collections of Sunni Islam
- Sittace, an ancient city, the capital of Sittacene, in Assyria, called 'Sitta' by Diodorus the Sicilian

== People ==
- Eva Sitta (born 1954), Czech-born Australian actress, married to Vladimir Sitta
- Edson Sitta (born 1983), Brazilian football player
- Frank Sitta (born 1978), German politician
- Margaret Simwanza Sitta (born 1946), Urambo politician
- Salman Abu Sitta (born 1937), Palestinian researcher
- Samuel Sitta (1942–2016), Urambo politician
- Vladimir Sitta, Australian landscape architect

== See also ==
- "Flagpole Sitta", a 1997 Harvey Danger single
- Almahata Sitta, meteorite fragment
