= George Ronald Richards =

Ron Richards OBE
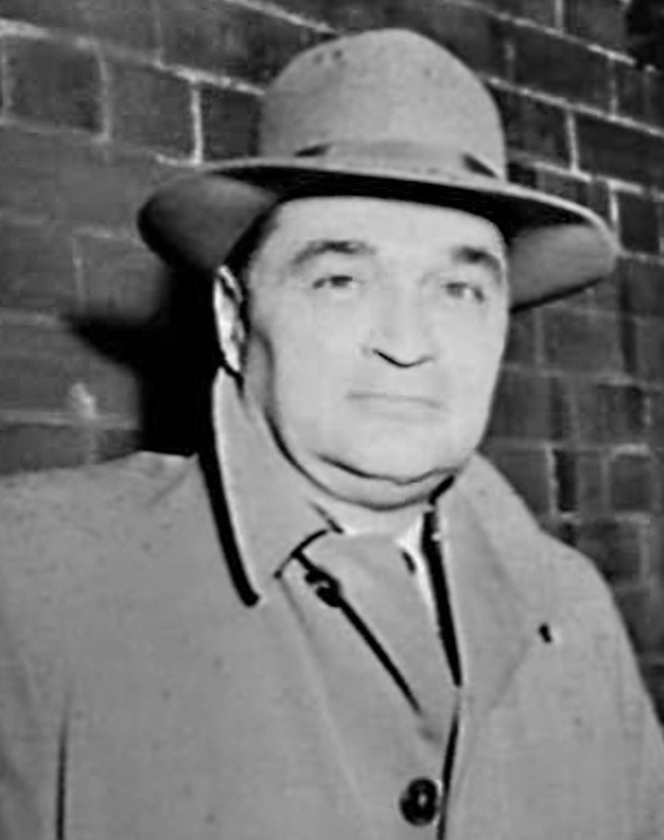
- Born: George Ronald Richards; 27 November 1905; Nottingham, England
- Died: 25 September 1985 (aged 79); Victoria Park, Perth, Western Australia
- Occupations: police officer, intelligence operative
- Years active: 1928–1969
- Known for: Petrov Affair; Deputy Director-General of ASIO

George Ronald Richards OBE (27 November 1905 – 25 September 1985) was a British-born Australian police officer and intelligence operative. In 1953 he was closely involved in Operation Cabin 12, arranging the defection of Vladimir Petrov from the Soviet Union to Australia. In 1954, he was appointed Deputy Director-General of the Australian Security Intelligence Organisation (ASIO), roughly equivalent to the FBI and MI5. He received the Order of the British Empire in 1957.

== Early life and career ==
Richards was born on 27 November 1905, in Nottingham, England. He moved to Australia at age 21 and joined the Western Australia Police in 1928. He later worked in the Criminal Investigation Branch and, from September 1939 to 1942, led the Special Bureau and Aliens Office.

Richards began his intelligence career with a secondment to the Commonwealth Security Service until November 1945. In March 1942, he was key in the arrests of four members of the Australia First Movement in Perth, two of whom were convicted of conspiring to assist the enemy; the others were interned.

Richards was appointed Perth's regional director of the Australian Security Intelligence Organisation in 1949 after its formation on 16 March and became involved in the multi-national Venona project, looking into leaks of information to the Soviet Union discovered in diplomatic cables intercepted by the United States. In 1950, Richards became deputy director for Venona and went to work with MI5 in November 1952, after which he became ASIO's deputy director for New South Wales.

== Petrov Affair ==
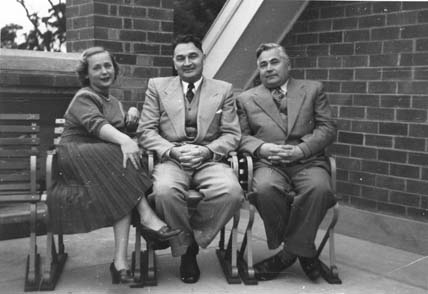
Ron Richards (centre) with defectors Vladimir and Evdokia Petrov in 1954

In 1953 and 1954, as deputy director for New South Wales, Richards was in charge of Operation Cabin 12, the arrangement of the defection of USSR spy Vladimir Petrov. Since February 1951, Petrov had been working for the KGB from the Canberra embassy. Michael Bialoguski was assigned to stay close to Petrov and report on his activities to ASIO, for whom he worked part-time. In time, Petrov started to hint to Bialoguski about defection. After Bialoguski was fired by ASIO, he told them on 23 November 1953 that Petrov and his wife wanted to defect but also threatened to go to the papers if he were not reinstated. It was Richards who warned the Director-General, Charles Spry, about the situation. On 27 November, Richards met Bialoguski and re-employed him on behalf of ASIO and briefed him on how he was to deal with Petrov. Richards reported frequently to Spry from this point until the end of the operation.

At this point, the planning for Petrov's defection was called Operation Cabin 11 (possible defectors were called "Cabin Candidates"). In December and January, the tentative plan was for Petrov to buy a chicken farm as the basis for his new life. Bialoguski showed him around the "Dream Acres" farm near Sydney on 12 December. In January 1954 the plan was redesignated Operation Cabin 12.

Richards' first in-person meeting with Petrov took place on 27 February 1954. In Bialoguski's flat, Richards offered Petrov political asylum and on 19 March offered him £5,000 in cash. In all, Richards met with Petrov twelve times, frequently recording him and negotiating the terms of the defection, particularly aiming to make sure Petrov brought with him valuable documents to share with the Australian government. Petrov's defection ultimately took place on 3 April and was announced on the 13th by then–Prime Minister Robert Menzies. In response, the Soviet Union closed its Australian Embassy on 23 April. Richards debriefed Petrov, starting on the day of his formal defection.

== Later career ==
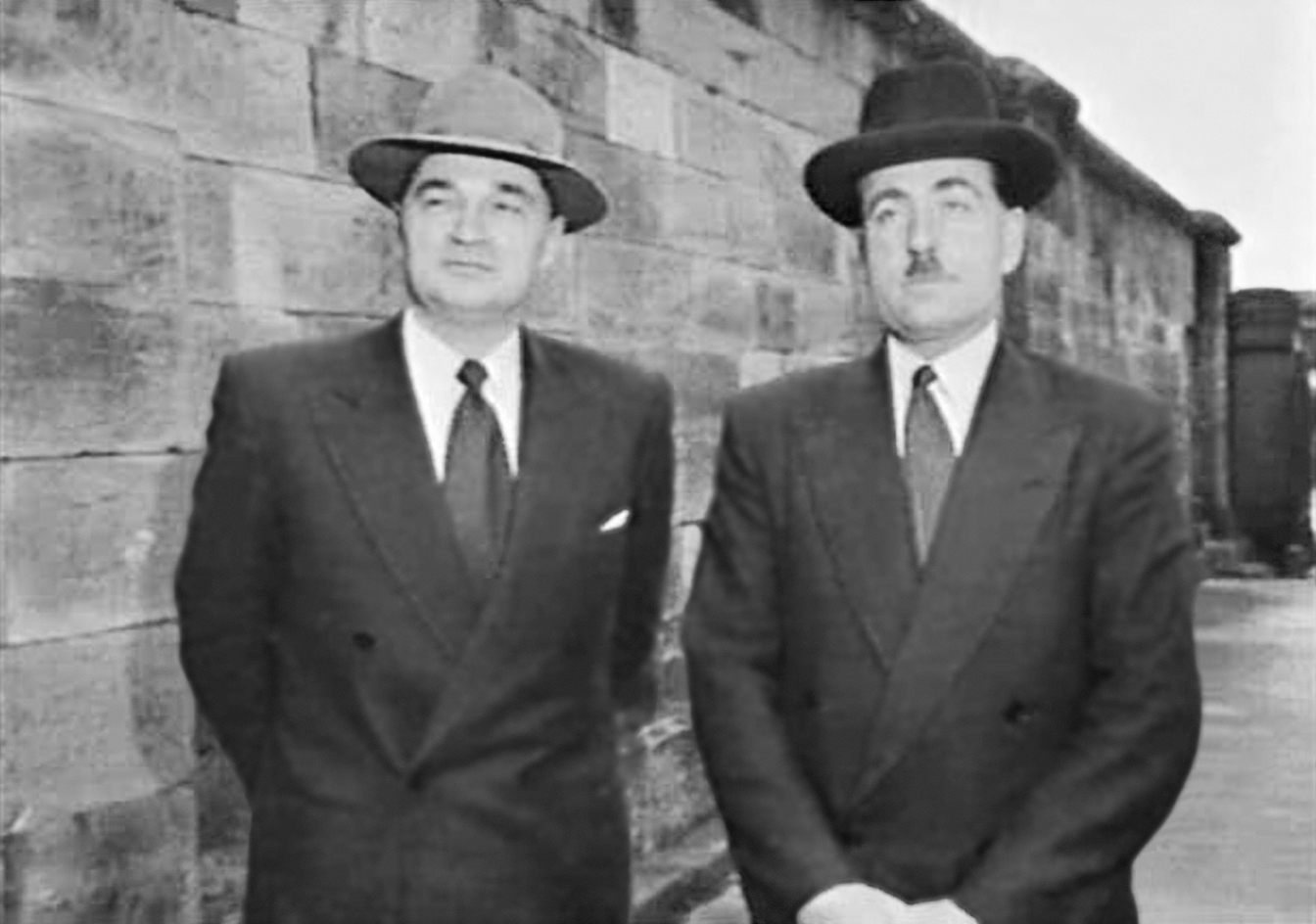
Richards with Charles Spry during the Petrov Royal Commission

As a result of the Petrov affair, a Royal Commission on espionage was convened in May 1954. Richards was appointed deputy director-general of ASIO under Spry, in which role he had charge of ASIO's commission unit. He arranged for the Petrovs to appear before the commission and submitted ASIO documents to it, but Richards was not in the end questioned. In 1957, he was made an Officer of the Order of the British Empire (OBE). He subsequently served on a committee of security experts in the Southeast Asia Treaty Organization, and in 1961 was chairman of the counter-subversion expert study group of the same organisation.

In 1965, during the Cold War, Richards, together with ASIO head of counter-espionage Don Marshall, recruited defence analyst Paul Dibb to identify KGB agents at the re-established Soviet Embassy in Canberra and try to recruit them in turn, which Dibb did until 1984. Dibb remembered Richards as the only man Marshall ever referred to as "Sir". Dibb was later investigated by ASIO on suspicion of being a double agent but was exonerated, and wrote the influential Dibb Report about Australia's defence policy in 1985 and 1986.

After four years as senior liaison officer at Australia House, Richards retired in 1969.

== Personal life ==
Richards was married on 27 April 1929 to Clarice Edna Counsel, with whom he had one daughter, and a son who died in infancy. Clarice died on 22 December 1982, and Ron died on 25 September 1985 at home in Victoria Park, Perth. Both were buried in Karrakatta Cemetery.
