= The Petrov Affair (miniseries) =

- Written by: Cliff Green; Mac Gudgeon
- Directed by: Michel Carson
- Starring: Alex Menglet; Eva Sitta
- Country of origin: Australia
- Original language: English
- No. of episodes: 2 × 2 hours

Production
- Producer: Bob Weis

Original release
- Network: PBL Productions
- Release: 27 May – 28 May 1987

The Petrov Affair is a 1987 mini series based on the defection of Vladimir Petrov.

== Cast ==
- Alex Menglet as Vladimir Petrov
- Eva Sitta as Evdokia Petrov
- Simon Chilvers as H. V. Evatt
- Swawomir Wabik as Michael Bialoguski
- Dennis Miller as Eddie War
- Mark Mitchell as West
- Kym Gyngell as Harry Pitt
- Geneviève Picot as Joyce Bull
- Brian Moll as Billy Wentworth
- Wynn Roberts as Brigadier Spry
- Marion Edward as Mrs Munro
- Alan Hopgood as Alan Reid
- James Condon as Robert Menzies
- Melita Jurisic as Nina Morozov

== Production ==
On the 10th of January 1986, the filmmakers bought an ad in The Australian Jewish News, seeking Russian Jews to act as extras. Filming was scheduled over 10 weeks in Melbourne in 1986. The series also filmed in Canberra. It was written using research from then recently released government documents that disproved a popular conspiracy theory surrounding the defection.

== Reception ==
Channel 9 chose to screen The Petrov Affair out of the ratings period.

Barbara Hooks of the Age gave it a negative review and asked "How could a story which has teased the curiosity of Australians for decades be delivered to the screen so bled of its natural drama that, for the most part, it has all the lure of a long-winded night at the politburo?" Garrie Hutchinson, also of the Age, was a little more positive but says the series didn't go far enough. "A scarifying 12 hours about Australia in the 1950s might have been a hit - The Petrov Affair was a victim, like the original events, of its lack of ambition." In the same masthead Jane Sullivan wrote "The Petrov Affair is sometimes muddled, sometimes silly, and about as thrilling as reading back copies of Hansard" and she called "the mediocrity of this mini-series such a tragedy."

The Sydney Morning Herald's Doug Anderson wrote that the story was "enhanced by the recent release of hitherto classified documents which have illuminated numerous aspects of the complex events surrounding [the Petrov's] defection in April 1954."
