= Michael Thwaites =

Australian poet

- Born: 30 May 1915; Brisbane, Queensland
- Died: 1 November 2005 (aged 90); Canberra, ACT
- Education: University of Melbourne, University of Oxford Rhodes Scholar
- Occupations: Poet, naval officer, intelligence analyst
- Employer(s): Australian Security Intelligence Organisation, Australian Parliament
- Notable work: "Poems of War and Peace" "The Honey Man" "Unfinished Journey" "The Singing Light" "Truth Will Out: ASIO and the Petrovs" "Atlantic Odyssey"
- Title: Director of Counter-Espionage; Assistant Parliamentary Librarian
- Parent(s): Robert Ernest, and Jessie Elizabeth, Thwaites
- Awards: AO, The Newdigate Prize, King's Gold Medal for Poetry

Michael Rayner Thwaites, AO (30 May 1915 – 1 November 2005) was an Australian academic, poet, and intelligence officer.

== Early life and education ==
Thwaites was born in Brisbane, to Yorkshire immigrant Robert Ernest Thwaites who taught at Brisbane Grammar School and Jessie Elizabeth, daughter of Sir Hugh Nelson, a previous premier of Queensland. He was educated at Geelong Grammar School, entering Trinity College at the University of Melbourne from which he graduated in 1937. As a student he came into contact with the Oxford Group (later Moral Rearmament), whose ideas greatly influenced him. He was awarded a Rhodes Scholarship to attend the University of Oxford where he won the Newdigate Prize (1938) for poetry and the King's Gold Medal for Poetry (1940). He was the first Australian to win either of these prizes, and is still the only Australian to have won the Newdigate Prize.

== Naval and intelligence career ==
Thwaites joined the Royal Naval Volunteer Reserve and was an officer in World War II. In 1999 he published Atlantic Odyssey, an account of his war service on anti-submarine escort naval trawlers and an armed whaler. After the war he returned to Oxford to complete his studies, graduating MA B Litt, then returned to Australia, becoming a lecturer in English at the University of Melbourne in 1947.

Despite having no background in intelligence work, Thwaites was recruited in 1950 to the Australian Security Intelligence Organisation (ASIO) by its director-general Charles Spry. Unlike the British tradition of university recruitment, in 1950 almost all ASIO staff were from military intelligence and police operational backgrounds, and Spry had been encouraged to recruit senior staff with higher educational credentials. Thwaites proved to be a highly competent intelligence officer and encouraged more analytical recruitment policies. Despite some outside criticism that ASIO staff was an "old boys' club" (perhaps based on the assumption that ASIO was modelled on MI5), military and police backgrounds dominated ASIO staffing into the 1970s and Thwaites eventually resigned believing that the analytical resources were undervalued.

In 1954 Thwaites played a leading role in the defection of the Soviet diplomat Vladimir Petrov to Australia, which led to the celebrated Petrov Affair. When Petrov first defected it was Thwaites who debriefed him, and he later spent 18 months with Vladimir and Evdokia Petrov at an ASIO "safe house" in Sydney, helping them write their life stories in the book "Empire of Fear".

Thwaites always insisted that the timing of Petrov's defection was determined by Petrov, and was not orchestrated to coincide with the 1954 federal election, as the Labor Party leader, Dr H. V. Evatt said at the time and as many people in Australia continued for many years to believe. He also maintained that Petrov was a genuinely important source of intelligence in the Cold War context, revealing the names of about 600 Soviet operatives around the world. Thwaites recorded his part in these events in Truth Will Out: ASIO and the Petrovs. He also ghost-wrote the Petrovs' book Empire of Fear.

== Literary life and career ==
Thwaites left ASIO in 1971 to become Assistant Parliamentary Librarian. This position enabled him to devote more time to poetry, which was always his first love. His best known poems include The Jervis Bay, The Prophetic Hour, and Message to My Grandson. His collected poems spanning 1932 to 2004 were published as Unfinished Journey, which won the 2005 ACT Writing and Publishing Awards for poetry. With his wife Honor, he wrote the patriotic hymn For Australia, to a tune by Henry Purcell. Unfinished Journey was republished with some minor changes in a hardback volume titled The Singing Light on the occasion of Michael Thwaites's centenary in 2015. His poetry is also available on the website www.thwaites.com.au which is maintained by the Michael and Honor Thwaites Heritage Association.

== Honours ==
Thwaites was made an officer of the Order of Australia in 2002. He was an honorary fellow of Trinity College, Melbourne.
