= Petrov Affair =

Cold War spy incident in Australia

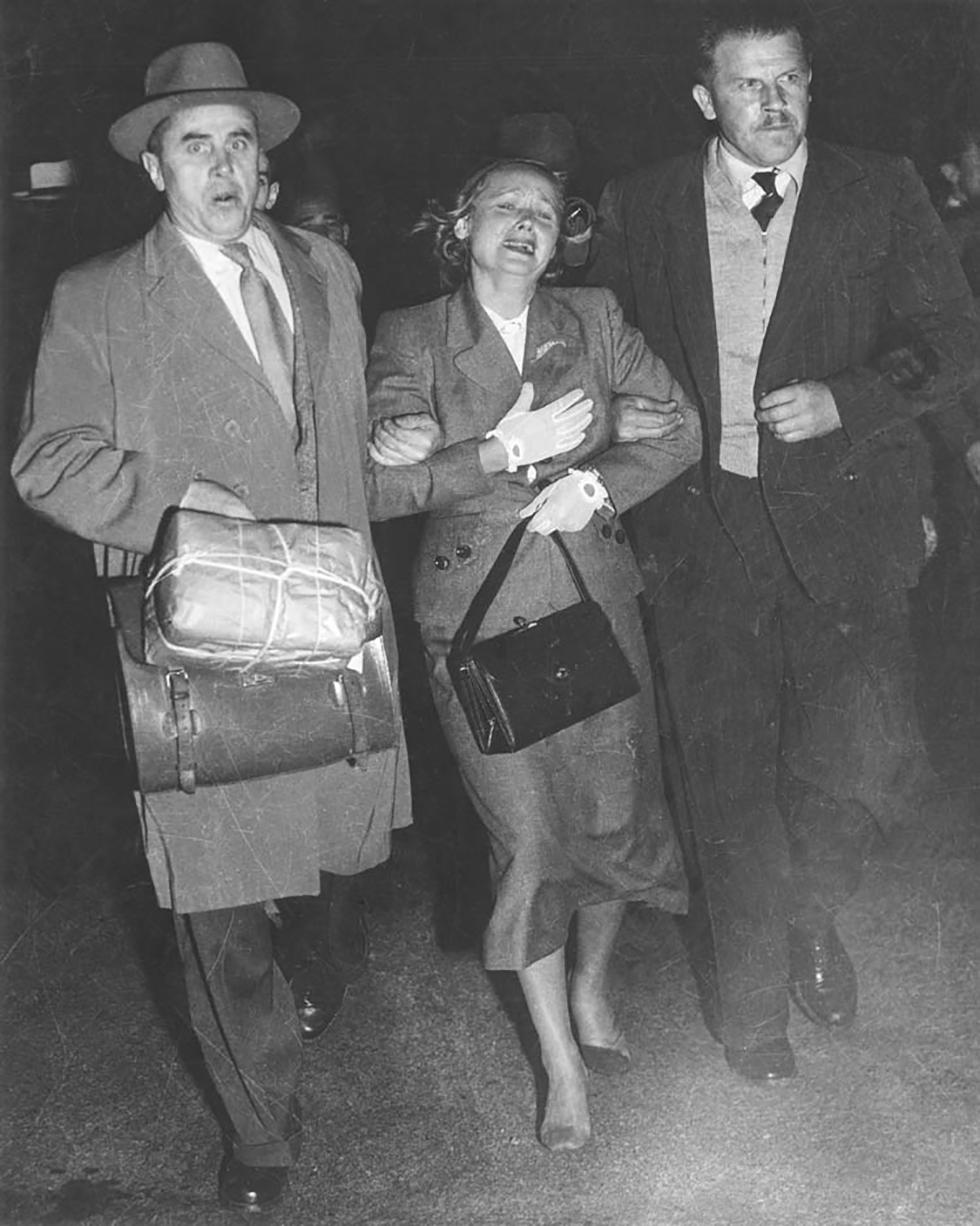
Evdokia Petrova at Mascot Airport, Sydney, being escorted across the tarmac to a waiting plane by two armed Soviet diplomatic couriers (19 April 1954).

The Petrov Affair was a Cold War spy incident in Australia, concerning the defection of Vladimir Petrov, a KGB officer, from the Soviet embassy in Canberra in 1954. The defection led to a Royal Commission and the resulting controversy contributed to the Australian Labor Party split of 1955.

== Background ==
Petrov, despite his relatively junior diplomatic status, was a colonel in (what became in 1954) the KGB, the Soviet secret police, and his wife Evdokia Petrova was an officer at the Ministry of Internal Affairs (MVD). The Petrovs had been sent to the Canberra embassy in 1951 by the Soviet security chief, Lavrentiy Beria. After Joseph Stalin's death in March 1953, Beria had been arrested and shot by Khrushchevites, and Vladimir Petrov evidently feared that, if he returned to the Soviet Union, he would be purged as a "Beria man".

== Defection ==
Petrov made contact with the Australian Security Intelligence Organisation (ASIO) and offered to provide evidence of Soviet espionage in exchange for political asylum. The defection was arranged by Michael Bialoguski, a Polish doctor and musician, and part-time ASIO agent, who had cultivated Petrov for nearly two years, befriending him and taking him to visit prostitutes in Sydney's King's Cross area. Bialoguski introduced Petrov to a senior ASIO officer, Ron Richards, who offered Petrov asylum plus £5,000 in exchange for all the documents he could bring with him from the embassy. Planning for Petrov's defection was codenamed Operation Cabin 12, after a briefer period of being designated Operation Cabin 11, following the standard practice of referring to potential defectors as "Cabin Candidates". Petrov defected on 3 April 1954.

=== Evdokia Petrova ===
Petrov did not tell his wife Evdokia of his intentions; apparently he planned to defect without her. After falsely claiming that Australian authorities had kidnapped Petrov, the MVD sent two couriers to Australia to fetch Evdokia Petrova. Word of this leaked out and on 19 April there were violent anti-Communist demonstrations at Sydney Airport as Evdokia Petrova was escorted by the KGB men to the aircraft. On the plane, on radioed instructions from Prime Minister Robert Menzies, a flight attendant asked her if she was happy being escorted back to the USSR, but she did not give a clear answer, as she was racked with indecision – defection could have severe consequences for her family in the USSR. Menzies decided that he could not allow her to be removed in this way, and when the aircraft stopped for refuelling at Darwin Airport, she was seized from the MVD men by ASIO officials. (In order to separate Petrova from the MVD, the ASIO officials confronted them on the grounds that they were carrying arms, which it was illegal to do on an aircraft.) The ASIO officials offered Petrova asylum, which she accepted, after speaking to her husband by phone. By now it was the early hours of 20 April 1954.

=== Royal Commission ===
The affair grew more dramatic when Menzies told the House of Representatives that Petrov had brought with him documents concerning Soviet espionage in Australia. He announced that a Royal Commission would investigate the matter, the Royal Commission on Espionage. Petrov's documents were shown to the commission members, though they were never made public. The documents were alleged to provide evidence of an extensive Soviet spy ring in Australia, and named (among many others), two staff members of the leader of the Australian Labor Party, Dr. H. V. Evatt, during proceedings. Evatt, a former justice of the High Court of Australia and the third President of the United Nations General Assembly, appeared before the Royal Commission as counsel for his staff members. His cross-examination of a key ASIO operative transformed the commission's hearings and greatly perturbed the government. Almost immediately, the Royal Commission simply withdrew Evatt's leave to appear. Evatt alleged that the judges of the commission were biased towards the Menzies' government in the wake of this unprecedented denial of his right to appear.

Another person who was questioned at length (over a week) about his activities and associations was Ric Throssell, a diplomat and former adviser to Evatt. His mother, the writer Katharine Susannah Prichard, was a committed Communist, and it was strongly suggested he had at least inadvertently, if not wittingly, given her classified information, as well as actively spying for the Soviet Union. The final report did not uphold these charges, but his career from then on was blighted by these suspicions.

== Aftermath and legacy ==
As a result of the defections, the Australian embassy staff in Moscow was expelled and the USSR embassy staff in Canberra recalled. Diplomatic relations were not re-established until 13 March 1959.

=== Political repercussions ===
1970 ABC interview with Robert Menzies and Allan Fraser, discussing their recollections of the Petrov Affair

The defections came shortly before the 1954 federal election. Evatt accused Menzies of having arranged the defections to coincide with the election, for the benefit of the incumbent Liberal Party.

According to some, partly as a result of the Petrov Affair, Menzies was successful at the election, which Labor had been widely expected to win. The Royal Commission continued for the rest of 1954 and uncovered some evidence of espionage for the Soviet Union by some members and supporters of the Communist Party of Australia during and immediately after World War II, but no-one was ever charged with an offence as a result of the commission's work and no major spy ring was uncovered. (One was given immunity from prosecution, others who had handled documents had not technically broken the law, one was in Prague and remained there, and evidence against others could not be presented because it would have revealed that Western intelligence services had broken Soviet codes).

Evatt's loss of the election and his belief that Menzies had conspired with ASIO to contrive Petrov's defection led to criticism within the Labor Party of his decision to appear before the Royal Commission. He compounded this by writing to the Soviet Foreign Minister, Vyacheslav Molotov, asking if allegations of Soviet espionage in Australia were true. When Molotov replied, denying the allegations, Evatt read the letter out in Parliament, inviting amazement and ridicule from his opponents.

=== ALP split ===
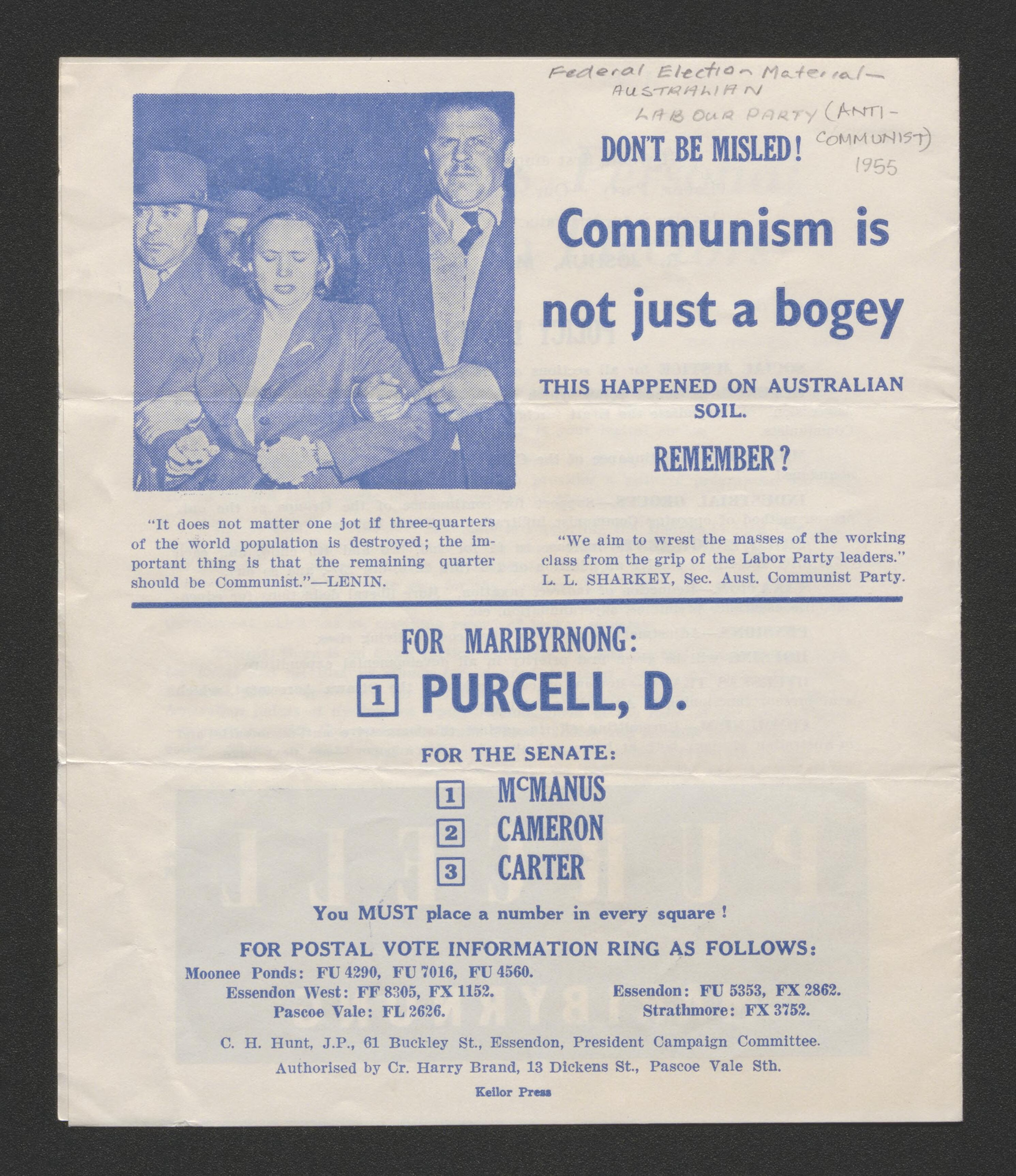
Campaign material used by the Australian Labor Party (Anti-Communist) at the 1955 federal election, referencing the Petrov Affair

Evatt's actions aroused the anger of the right wing of the Labor Party, influenced by the Catholic anti-Communism of B. A. Santamaria and his clandestine "Movement". Evatt came to believe that the Movement was also part of the conspiracy against him, and publicly denounced Santamaria and his supporters in October 1954, leading to a major split in the Labor Party, which did not win office again until 1972.

=== Fate of the Petrovs ===
The Petrovs, having been given political asylum, were eventually settled in suburban Melbourne under the names Sven and Anna Allyson, and given a pension. Prior to this, they spent an 18-month period in a safe house in Palm Beach, Sydney, with the then ASIO officer Michael Thwaites, who ghost-wrote their memoirs, published in 1956 as Empire of Fear.

They lived in relative obscurity for the rest of their lives. The press was formally requested by the Department of Defence, by way of a D-Notice, not to reveal their identities or whereabouts, but this was not always honoured. Vladimir died in 1991 and Evdokia in 2002.

=== Retrospection ===
The belief that there had been a "Petrov conspiracy" became an article of faith in the Labor Party and on the left generally for many years, although even pro-Labor historians acknowledged that Evatt's eccentric conduct had contributed greatly to the Labor split. The "left" version of the Petrov story was given in 1974 in Nest of Traitors: The Petrov Affair, by Nicholas Whitlam (son of Gough Whitlam, who was Labor Prime Minister at the time of publication) and John Stubbs. This book was written without access to classified documents.

Menzies always denied that he had had advance knowledge of Petrov's defection, although he did not deny that he had exploited it and Cold War anti-Communist sentiment. Colonel Charles Spry, head of ASIO at the time, when interviewed after his retirement, maintained that, although it had taken some months of negotiations to bring about Petrov's defection, he had not told Menzies about these negotiations and that the timing of the defection had no connection to the elections.

In 1984, the ASIO files on Petrov and the records of the Royal Commission were made available to historians. In 1987, the historian Robert Manne published The Petrov Affair: Politics and Espionage, which gave the first full account of the affair. He showed that Evatt's suspicions were unfounded, that Menzies and Spry had been telling the truth, that there had been no conspiracy, and that Evatt's own conduct had been mainly responsible for subsequent political events.

But Manne also showed that although there had been some Soviet espionage in Australia, there was no major Soviet spy ring, and that most of the documents given by Petrov to ASIO contained little more than political gossip which could have been compiled by any journalist. This included the notorious "Document J", which had been written by Rupert Lockwood, a member of the Communist Party of Australia expressing his beliefs on the matter. Page 35 of the document sourced the information to Evatt's staffers, Fergan O’Sullivan, Albert Grundeman, and Allan Dalziel. Evatt insisted that page 35 was misinformation added specifically to damage the Australian Labor Party. He managed to prove that his staff had not authored the document. The Royal Commission concluded that Document J was entirely Lockwood's work.

== Fictional works ==
The Petrov Affair has inspired a number of fictional works, many of which have won awards.

- The Hunted One (1954) - radio serial
- The Case of Colonel Petrov (1956) - episode of American series Armstrong Circle Theatre
- Defection! The Case of Colonel Petrov (1968) - a British television play
- The Petrov Affair, a 1987 television mini-series.
- True Believers (1988) - Australian mini series that touches on the Affair
- The Red Shoe, a novel by Ursula Dubosarsky, which won the New South Wales Premier's Literary Award and the Queensland Premier's Literary Award in 2006.
- Mrs Petrov's Shoe, a play by Noelle Janaczewska, which won the Queensland Premier's Literary Award for drama in 2006.
- The Safe House, an animation by Lee Whitmore, narrated by Noni Hazlehurst, which won Best Animation at the Sydney Film Festival 2006.
- Document Z, a novel by Andrew Croome, which won the Australian/Vogel Literary Award in 2008.
- The Petrov Poems, a 2013 verse-novel by Lesley Lebkowicz. This book was shortlisted for the 2014 ACT Book of the Year Award and won the 2014 ACT Writing and Publishing Awards: Poetry Book Category.

== See also ==
- Australia–Russia relations
- Gouzenko Affair - A similar defection by a Soviet official in Canada in 1945
