= Geoffrey Reed =

Sir Geoffrey Reed KC
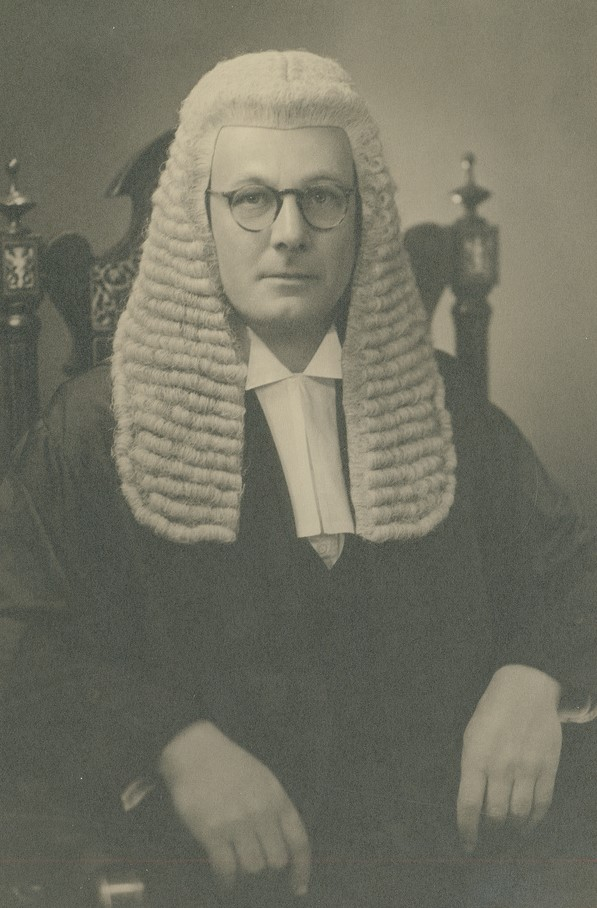

1st Director-General of Security
- In office 9 March 1949 – 30 June 1950
- Prime Minister: Ben Chifley (1949); Robert Menzies (1949–1950)
- Succeeded by: Sir Charles Spry

Personal details
- Born: Geoffrey Sandford Reed; 14 March 1892 Port Pirie, South Australia
- Died: 31 December 1970 (aged 78) North Adelaide, South Australia, Australia
- Spouse: Kathleen Matthews
- Education: University of Adelaide
- Profession: Barrister, jurist

Military service
- Allegiance: Australia
- Branch/service: Australian Army
- Years of service: 1918–1919

Sir Geoffrey Sandford Reed, KC (14 March 1892 – 31 December 1970) was a justice of the Supreme Court of South Australia and the first Director-General of Security and head of the Australian Security Intelligence Organisation (ASIO).

== Early life ==
He was born in Port Pirie on 14 March 1892, the first child of William Reed and his wife Elizabeth, née Lathlean. William Reed was a Wesleyan clergyman, and Geoffrey was educated at Prince Alfred College, a Methodist school. Reed studied law at the University of Adelaide and was admitted as a solicitor and barrister on 25 April 1914. He enlisted in the Australian Imperial Force on 18 February 1918, and was married later the same year to Kathleen Matthews. He was posted to England and France and served with a supply depot. He was discharged in Adelaide on 21 May 1919.

Through the 1920s and 1930s, Reed became a partner in McLachlan, Reed & Griffiths, was active in the Law Society of South Australia and lectured in law at the University of Adelaide. He chaired a Royal Commission on transport in 1937, and in August 1938 was appointed King's Counsel. He was appointed to the Supreme Court of South Australia in 1943, having acted as judge for a period earlier.

== ASIO ==
Reed was involved in security, including chairing the South Australian National Security Advisory Committee from 1941. He undertook a number of inquiries on security issues for the federal government. Reed was appointed as Commonwealth Director-General of Security on 2 March 1949. A fortnight later, the Australian Security Intelligence Organisation was established. The Australian Government of Ben Chifley was pressured by its allies to address security shortcomings at the beginning of the Cold War.

In late 1943 Judge Reed was commissioned by Attorney General H.V. Evatt to conduct an inquiry into the competence of Lt. Colonel Robert ( Bob) Wake who was in charge of the Commonwealth Security Service in Queensland. Serious charges had been made by the Army's Commander-in-chief, General Thomas Blamey, that Wake was an incompetent, used "lewd" women as agents and had lost the trust of Australia's American allies. Judge Reed found that all charges were false and when Prime Minister Chifley told him that Wake was the government's preferred choice to run ASIO, Judge Reed was very happy to work with Wake. Wake was the operational head of ASIO from its formation until Reed retired. Wake was responsible for appointing key agents to spy on the Russian Club in Sydney that eventually led to the Petrov Defection. During the formation of ASIO Wake worked very closely with the MI5 liaison officer, Courtney Young, who took snuff and wore spats.

ASIO was modelled on the British equivalent, MI5. Its first authorised telephone interceptions were in June 1949, followed in July by a raid on the Sydney office of the Communist Party of Australia. Reed and ASIO were supported by the new Prime Minister, Robert Menzies after the 1949 election and he received warm tributes at the end of his post in July 1950 from both sides of politics.

Reed returned to the Supreme Court of South Australia and was knighted in 1953 Coronation Honours List. He chaired a Royal Commission in electoral boundaries in 1955 and served as acting Governor of South Australia twice in 1957. In 1959, he was judge in the controversial trial of Max Stuart, an Aborigine accused of murdering a 9-year-old girl and subsequently also appointed to the Royal Commission into the conviction.

Reed retired from the court in 1962 and retired in Adelaide after some travel overseas. He died on 31 December 1970 and was cremated.

Government offices
New position	Director-General of Security; 1949–1950	Succeeded by Sir Charles Spry
