= Royal Commission on Espionage =

Australian inquiry into Soviet espionage

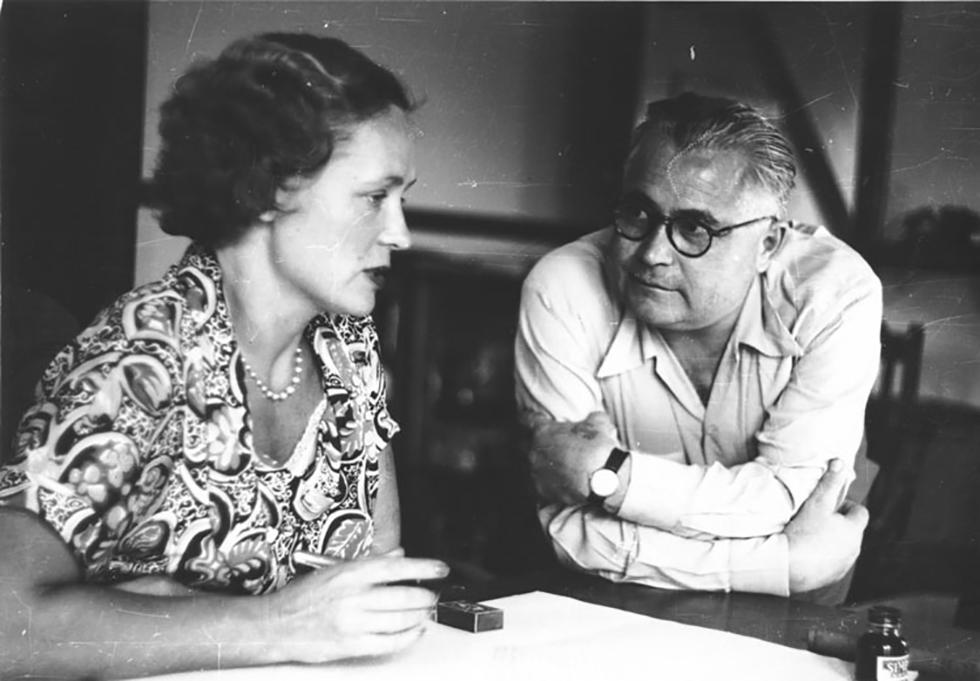
- A picture of Vladimir Petrov and his wife. Petrov was a key testifier in the commission
- Date: April 13, 1954 – August 22, 1955
- Location: Albert Hall, Canberra
- Also known as: Petrov Affair
- Cause: Petrov's defection from the Soviet Union
- First reporter: Vladimir Petrov
- Participants: Vladimir Petrov; William Owen (Commissioner); Victor Windeyer (Council assisting)
- Outcome: No prosecutions, expulsion of the Soviet Embassy
- Inquiries: Royal Commission into espionage committed by the Soviet Union

The Royal Commission on Espionage was a royal commission established on 13 April 1954 by the Australian government pursuant to the Royal Commissions Act 1902 to inquire into and report on Soviet espionage in Australia. The establishment of the commission followed the defection of Soviet diplomat Vladimir Petrov (the "Petrov Affair"). Officially titled Third Secretary of the Soviet Embassy in Canberra, it was revealed that Petrov was in fact a lieutenant colonel in the KGB and in charge of espionage in Australia.

== Background ==
In 1954, after the instability caused by the death of Joseph Stalin, Petrov made contact with ASIO and offered to provide evidence of the espionage efforts in exchange for political asylum. Over the next few months, ASIO and Petrov exchanged information and his escape plan through dead drops. On 3 April 1954 Petrov defected to Australia, with his wife following on 20 April 1954 after having been freed from Soviet guards by police at Darwin airport.

== Commission ==
On 13 April 1954, Prime Minister Robert Menzies announced to the House of Representatives the defection of Petrov and the existence of documents pertaining to Soviet espionage in Australia. He also announced the establishment of the commission. Petrov's documents were shown to the commission, though they have never been made public. Over the course of the commission 119 witnesses were also questioned, notably two staff members of the Australian Labor Party. The staff were represented by the leader of the party H. V. Evatt himself. Evatt would later call the commission a political play by the Menzies Government to secure a victory in the 1954 election.

Among the documents Petrov gave to the commission were two key documents labeled H and J.

Document J was a document written by prominent Australian communist Rupert Lockwood. Lockwood considered the Soviet Union allies against the alleged rising fascism and Japan and the United States attempts to imperialise Australia. ASIO believed the documents were simply propaganda, while Evatt believed that the document had been altered to name three members of his staff.

Document H was written by Evatt's secretary of staff Fergan O’Sullivan. It consisted of biographical accounts of members of the 1952 press gallery, and was given to the Soviets by O'Sullivan under the pretense of helping them plant pro-Soviet articles in the press. In fact, the document was used to identify potential agents.

== Findings ==
The principal findings of the commission were that the "Petrov Papers" were legitimate, that the Soviet Embassy in Canberra had been used for espionage between 1943 and its expulsion in 1954, and that only known Soviet collaborators were communists. At the time the commission was considered by many on the left to be a McCarthyism show trial.

== 1998 claims ==
In 1944 Allied "Ultra" estimates of Japanese troop strength were being sent to Tokyo from Australia; initially thought to be from the Chinese attaché Colonel Wang, they were traced to the Soviet Embassy (which did not have access to Ultra information) by the Harbin Special Spy Report. In 1998 it was claimed by Desmond Ball and David Horner that they were given to the Japanese by the Soviet consulate in Harbin, Manchuria as Stalin wanted to delay an American victory over Japan until the Soviet Union could participate. The information was from Evatt’s staff, and enabled Japan to reinforce troops on Leyte (which MacArthur's G-2 Willoughby had underestimated), and led to a longer and costlier battle for Leyte.

== See also ==
- Petrov Affair
- Vladimir Petrov (diplomat)
- Petrov's Bridge
- Australia–Russia relations
