= Maria (1992 film) =

1992 documentary film

- Directed by: Barbara Chobocky
- Written by: Barbara Chobocky; Jeff Bruer
- Produced by: Barbara Chobocky
- Starring: Eva Sitta
- Release date: 1992
- Running time: 58 minutes
- Country: Australia
- Language: English

Maria is a 1992 Australian documentary film created by Barbara Chobocky. It tells the story of her mother, Maria, who with her husband John fled Czechoslovakia in 1948 or 49, ending up in Sydney. They were unable to return due to the political situation back in their homeland and they both died in Australia in 1975. It is told through Maria's letters to Prague (read by actress Eva Sitta), John's home movies, news footage and interviews with friends and relatives. It was broadcast nationally by the ABC as part of The Big Picture documentary series.

== Reception ==
Mary Colbert wrote in the Sydney Morning Herald that it was "a powerfully moving biography of her mother's life as a migrant in Australia, set against the political history of her homeland, Czechoslovakia, over the last 40 years." the Sydney Morning Herald's Lynden Barber said "It's a remarkable piece of work which operates on a number of levels and builds to a deeply moving conclusion." Doug Anderson also of the Sydney Morning Herald begun his capsule review "You won't see a better doco than Barbara Chobocky's portrait of her mother." Jeny Thornley of Filmnews says "it is a thoughtful and lovingly made film which illuminates the life of a courageous woman and her motherland".

== Awards ==
- 1992 Human Rights Medal and Awards
  - Documentary Film Award - Maria - Barbara Chobocky, Director/ Writer/Producer
- 39th Sydney Film Festival Dendy Awards
  - Best Documentary - Maria (Barbara Chobocky) - won
  - Ethnic Affairs Commission Award - Maria - won
