= R. J. Stove =

Australian writer and composer (born 1961)

Robert James Stove (born 1961) is an Australian writer, editor, composer and organist.

== Biography ==
Born in 1961 in Sydney and later resident in Melbourne, Stove graduated from Sydney University in 1985. He is the author of four books: Prince of Music—a biography of the composer Palestrina; The Unsleeping Eye—a brief history of secret police from the sixteenth to the twentieth century; A Student's Guide to Music History—a summary history of classical music from the Middle Ages to the Second World War; and most recently César Franck: His Life and Times. He has co-edited, with James Franklin, Cricket Versus Republicanism—a posthumously published collection of essays by his father, the philosopher David Stove (1927–1994). Brought up as an atheist, he converted to Roman Catholicism in 2002.

Stove's articles have appeared in The American Conservative (he has been a contributing editor at that magazine since 2005), Chronicles, The American Spectator, The New Criterion, Taki's Magazine, Modern Age, Quadrant, National Observer, News Weekly, The University Bookman, and other magazines, mainly American. Most of his musical works have been either choral or for solo voice; several are published by Wirripang of Wollongong, New South Wales.

== Bibliography ==
- R. J. Stove, Prince of Music: Palestrina and His World (Quakers Hill Press, Sydney, 1990) ISBN 0-7316-8792-2
- R. J. Stove, The Unsleeping Eye: Secret Police and Their Victims (Encounter Books, San Francisco, 2003) ISBN 1-893554-66-X
- R. J. Stove, A Student's Guide to Music History (ISI Books, Wilmington, Delaware, 2007) ISBN 1-933859-41-5
- R. J. Stove and James Franklin (eds), Cricket Versus Republicanism (Quakers Hill Press, Sydney, 1995) ISBN 0-646-21328-8
- R. J. Stove, foreword to Peter Coleman, The Heart of James McAuley, 2nd edition (Connor Court Press, Ballan, Victoria, 2006) ISBN 0-9758015-6-2
- R. J. Stove, César Franck: His Life and Times (Scarecrow Press, Lanham, Maryland, 2011) ISBN 978-0-8108-8207-2
- R. J. Stove, chapter ('Desperately Seeking Franck: Tournemire and d'Indy as Franck Biographers') in Jennifer Donelson and Fr. Stephen Schloesser (edd), Mystic Modern: The Music, Thought, and Legacy of Charles Tournemire, (Church Music Association of America, Richmond, Virginia, 2014) ISBN 978-0-9916452-0-6
- Stove, R. J. (2024). Kings, Queens and Fallen Monarchies: Royal Dynasties of Interwar Europe. Barnsley: Pen and Sword Books. ISBN 9781399035422.
