= D-notice affair =

British political scandal

The D-notice affair was a British political scandal from 1967, in which Prime Minister Harold Wilson accused the Daily Express newspaper of breaching two D-notices which advised the press not to publish material which might damage national security. When the newspaper asserted it had been advised of no breach, an inquiry was set up under a committee of Privy Counsellors. The committee found against the Government, whereupon the Government refused to accept its findings on the disputed article, prompting press outrage and the resignation of the Secretary of the D-notice committee.

== Background ==
On 21 February 1967, an article in the Daily Express written by Chapman Pincher claimed that "thousands of private cables and telegrams sent out of Britain from the Post Office or from commercial cable companies are regularly being made available to the security authorities for scrutiny". According to the memoirs of Harold Wilson, who claimed that there were many inaccuracies in it, the story had come "from a disgruntled ex-employee of a cable company". The legal position at the time was that a warrant was needed under section 4 of the Official Secrets Act 1920, similar to that needed to intercept mail.

== Wilson's Commons remarks ==
Later that day, Prime Minister Harold Wilson was due to answer a question from Conservative MP Sir John Langford-Holt about the number of D-notices issued to the press. A D-notice advises the press of the subjects of stories it is advisable not to publish because of damage to national security; they are voluntary and have no legal standing, but almost all editors complied. No new D-notice had been issued since June 1964, but Wilson added an attack aimed at the Daily Express for publishing "a sensationalised and inaccurate story purporting to describe a situation in which in fact the powers and practice have not changed for well over 40 years."

When Langford-Holt's subsidiary question asked for D-notices to be kept to the minimum necessary, Wilson went on to assert, "What I am concerned with today is a clear breach of two D-notices, in spite of the fact that the newspaper concerned was repeatedly warned that they would be contravening the notices."

=== Response from Daily Express ===
The following morning the Daily Express allowed Pincher a column to refute Wilson's claim. Pincher wrote that Colonel Lohan, the Secretary to the Services, Press and Broadcasting committee (unofficially known as the D-notice committee), had confirmed to him after hearing of Wilson's Commons statement that the two D-notices which Wilson had referred to did not apply to his story. Lohan had nevertheless urged Pincher not to run the story.

== Inquiry ordered ==
On 23 February Wilson made a further statement to Parliament, which he wrote was "carefully prepared ... and even more carefully scrutinised". The statement stood by Wilson's previous remarks that the story breached the two D-notices, claimed that the Secretary to the D-notice committee had told the Express so, and noted that the committee was looking into the incident. Leader of the Opposition Edward Heath drew attention to the direct contradiction between what the Prime Minister and the Daily Express were claiming the Secretary to the D-notice committee had said, and urged a Committee of Privy Counsellors be appointed to investigate. Wilson replied by noting that another newspaper (the Daily Mail) had not published a similar story.

Late at night on 24 February it became obvious that the D-notice committee, consisting of a majority of members from the press, was seriously concerned about what it was being asked to do. The editor of the Daily Mirror, Lee Howard, resigned from the committee stating it would be a "gross abuse" to ask it to decide whether a story should actually have been censored. The further implication was that the members of the press on the committee were not going to sit in judgment on another newspaper. At this point Wilson conceded an inquiry by Privy Counsellors as demanded by Heath.
