= Lesley Lebkowicz =

Australian poet (born 1946)

Venerable Lesley Lebkowicz

Personal life
- Born: 1946 (age 79–80) Canberra, Australia
- Known for: Poetry; leadership in Insight Meditation community
- Occupation: Poet, writer, meditation teacher

Religious life
- Religion: Buddhism
- School: Theravāda (Insight meditation)

Lesley Lebkowicz (born 1946) is an Australian poet and prose writer based in Canberra. She is also associated with the Insight Meditation movement and has written about her temporary ordination as a Buddhist nun.

== Career ==
Lebkowicz has been active in the Canberra literary community for several decades. Her poetry and prose have appeared in public art projects across Canberra, including installations on buses and in the paving of the city as part of public arts initiatives.

She was shortlisted for the David Campbell Award for Poetry in 2006 and won the award in 2007. In 2013, she won the ACT Poetry Prize.

Lebkowicz was one of 100 notable Canberra writers included in the launch of the ACT Writers Showcase in 2012 to celebrate the centenary of Canberra.

== Religious life ==
Lebkowicz has practised Insight Meditation within the Theravāda Buddhist tradition and has written about her experience of temporary ordination as a Buddhist nun. She spends several months each year in Nepal and has served as leader of the Canberra Insight Meditation Group.

== The Petrov Poems ==
Lebkowicz's book The Petrov Poems (2013), centred on Vladimir Petrov and the Petrov Affair, received critical attention.

Writing in the Sydney Morning Herald, Peter Pierce described the depiction of Petrov's "harrowing previous life in Russia" as being "sketched with terse effect".

Bma magazine commented that the work "turns history from dry events into ones as well-fleshed out".

The Rochford Street Review described the book as "an accomplished achievement, in which her detailed historical research, and her poetic and narrative skills blend to create a compelling evocation of a dramatic and significant period in post-war Australian political history".

The Petrov Poems was shortlisted for the 2014 ACT Book of the Year Award and won the 2014 ACT Writing and Publishing Awards in the Poetry Book category.

== Bibliography ==
- Fowler, Lesley (2001). Washing my mother’s hair. Charnwood, ACT: Mockingbird.
- Fowler, Lesley (2001). Crossing the sky. Wollongong, NSW: Five Islands Press.
- The way things really are : book IV of the Sutta-Nipata. Translated by Lesley Fowler Lebkowicz; Tamara Ditrich; Primoz Pecenko. Buddhist Education Foundation. 2006.
- Lebkowicz, Lesley (2013). The Petrov Poems. Sydney: Pitt Street Poetry.

=== Essays and reporting ===
- Lebkowicz, Lesley (December 2014). "Writing The Petrov poems". The National Library of Australia Magazine. 6 (4): 20–23.
