= Defence and Security Media Advisory Committee =

British advisory body

The Defence and Security Media Advisory (DSMA) Committee is a British government liaison advisory body established in 2015 which oversees a voluntary code which operates between the government departments which have responsibility for national security and the media. It has no formal censorship powers, but the notices it issues, typically regarding information sensitive to national defence and still informally known as "D-notices", are widely followed by the British media.

== History ==
The committee and its predecessors have been known by many different names.

- Admiralty, War Office and Press Committee, 1912–1919. An Assistant Secretary of the War Office and Mr. Robbins, the representative of the Press Association, were joint Secretaries. Letters, or telegrams, were sent to editors when agreed. They came to be known as "Parkers" after Mr. Parke who was then the representative of the Newspaper Proprietors' Association on the committee. This evolved into the D-Notice system.
- Admiralty, War Office, Air Ministry and Press Committee, 1919–1939.
- Admiralty, War Office, Air Ministry and Press Committee, 1945–1967. Admiral George Thompson, who had been the Chief Press Censor during the war, became the Secretary of the committee in 1945.
- Services, Press and Broadcasting Committee c.1967–1993. Vice Admiral Sir Norman Denning was appointed Secretary in 1967.
- Defence, Press and Broadcasting Committee, 1993–2015.

The records of the previous committees are held in the British National Archives.

The Defence, Press and Broadcasting Advisory Committee issued DA-Notices from 1993 to 2015. The secretary was a former two-star military officer employed from a Ministry of Defence budget and is housed by them (although technically independent) and the committee is made up of senior civil servants and representatives of national media organisations.

== Membership ==
The committee consisted of five government representatives and 16 media representatives. The five government positions on the committee were all ex officio – the chairman being the current Permanent Under Secretary of the Ministry of Defence. The 2nd Permanent Under Secretary of the Ministry of Defence, the Cabinet Office Permanent Secretary, the Permanent Under Secretary of the Home Office and the Deputy Under Secretary from the Foreign and Commonwealth Office were the other officers. The Vice Chairman was chosen by the press members from among their number.

The media representatives were nominated by the following organisations:

- BBC
- ITV
- ITN
- Sky TV
- Periodical Publishers Association (2 nominations)
- Newspaper Publishers Association (3 nominations)
- Newspaper Society (2 nominations)
- Press Association
- Scottish Daily Newspaper Society
- Society of Editors
- (Book) The Publishers Association
- Google (no longer a member as of 2024)

== Actions ==
On 25 November 2010, the Defence, Press and Broadcasting Advisory Committee sent DA-Notices to UK newspapers regarding an expected major publication by WikiLeaks of a "huge cache" of United States (US) diplomatic cables. Index on Censorship presented this as part of "a harm minimisation strategy the US government has embarked on [with] an impressive briefing campaign, reaching out to allies across the world."

== Overseas influence ==
Although Google was at one time a member, the DSMA committee is as of 2024 largely ignored by the global "gatekeeper" technology companies. Politico has reported that the committee has internally floated the idea of using OFCOM and the provisions of the Online Safety Act to influence these companies.
