= Petrov's Bridge =

Bridge in Australia

- Petrov's Bridge in October 2009
- Coordinates: 35.388719°S 149.174607°E
- Carried: Bombala railway line
- Locale: Hume
- Official name: Arnott Street Railway Bridge
- Other name: Petrov's Bridge
- Named for: Vladimir Petrov

Characteristics
- Material: Wood
- Total length: 2 metes
- Height: 3.8 metres
- Clearance below: 3.7 metres

History
- Opened: 1887
- Destroyed: 2018
- Closed: 1989

Location
- Interactive map of Petrov's Bridge

Arnott Street Railway Bridge (Petrov's Bridge) was a small, isolated railway bridge in Canberra, most famously used by soviet agent Vladimir Petrov in 1954 as a dead drop location for the Australian Security Intelligence Organisation (ASIO). The bridge was used as part of the Bombala railway line before it was demolished in 2018.

Petrov's Bridge also less commonly refers to the bridge Petrov revealed as a Soviet dead drop site, a different bridge along the Bombala railway line a few kilometres from Canberra station.

== History ==
Petrov's Bridge was built in 1887 as part of the Bombala railway line extension from Bungendore to Michelago. It was built to cross one of the few rural roads that existed in the area around Queanbeyan at the time. Its original wood and stone construction persisted its entire 131 years of existence.

Allegedly, during the 1950s a dark coloured car with tinted windows could regularly be seen near the bridge, as well as Petrov's Skoda on occasion.

During the 1970s Arnott Street was the main access road to the Tralee Speedway for the ACT. In 1982 Hume was gazetted and the bridge became part of the new suburb.

By 1989 both freight and passenger service eased south of Queanbeyan, leaving the bridge unused.

In 2018 the bridge was demolished, with Transport for NSW citing safety concerns over the low height of the bridge.

== As a dead drop location ==
During the 1950s Vladimir Petrov operated as the leader of the Soviet espionage efforts within their embassy in Canberra. In 1954, after the instability caused by the death of Joseph Stalin, Petrov made contact with ASIO and offered to provide evidence of the espionage efforts in exchange for political asylum. Over the next few months, ASIO and Petrov exchanged information and his escape plan through dead drops. The Arnott Street Railway Bridge was chosen as the dead drop location because of its isolation and abundance of hiding places.

Although the location of the bridge Petrov made his drops at was never officially disclosed, Petrov described the bridge in his testimony to the Royal Commission on Espionage as a railway bridge located on the Bombala railway line about "six and a half miles from Canberra". The only bridge fitting that description at the time was the Arnott Street Railway Bridge.
