= Elena Maria Vidal =

American novelist

- Born: August 15, 1962 (age 64)
- Education: Hood College (BA); State University of New York at Albany (MA)
- Occupation: Novelist

Elena Maria Vidal (born August 15, 1962), the pen name of Mary-Eileen Russell, is a historical novelist and noted blogger living in Easton, Maryland. She was born in Florence, Oregon and grew up in Frederick, Maryland. She is known for her defense of Louis XVI and Marie-Antoinette by means of her novels Trianon and Madame Royale, her Tea at Trianon blog, and her 2016 biography entitled Marie-Antoinette, Daughter of the Caesars

== Education ==
Vidal graduated in 1984 from Hood College in Frederick, Maryland with a BA in Psychology, and in 1985 from the State University of New York at Albany with an MA in Modern European History.

== Publications ==
In 1997 Vidal's first historical novel Trianon was published by St. Michaels Press. The historical novel tells of the life and death of Louis XVI and Marie-Antoinette. In 2000, the sequel Madame Royale was published, as well as the second edition of Trianon, by The Neumann Press. Madame Royale chronicles the life of Marie-Antoinette's daughter, Marie-Thérèse-Charlotte. In 2010, the third edition of Trianon and the second edition of Madame Royale were released. In November 2009, The Night's Dark Shade was published by Mayapple Books. The new historical novel deals with the controversial Albigensian Crusade in thirteenth century France. Vidal has been a contributor to Canticle Magazine, Touchstone Magazine, The American Conservative, The National Observer and the Historical Novels Review. In May 2016 Vidal's biography of Marie-Antoinette was published. In November 2021 Vidal published the first volume of her "Henrietta of France" trilogy, entitled My Queen, My Love: A Novel of Henrietta MariaMy Queen, My Love. She blogs at Tea at Trianon.

== Career ==
In May 1984 Vidal was a student delegate at the Naval Academy Foreign Affairs Conference in Annapolis, Maryland. She has worked as an elementary school teacher. and private tutor. In 2006, Vidal was interviewed by Doug Keck on the EWTN Bookmark show. In April 2009 she was a speaker at the Eucharistic Convention in Auckland, New Zealand. In August 2010 Vidal spoke at the Catholic Writers Conference in Valley Forge, PA. In October 2010 she was presented to Archduke Imre of Austria and to Prince Bertrand of Orleans-Braganza in York, PA. Vidal is a member of the Catholic Writers Guild and the Eastern Shore Writers Association. In 2011, Vidal interviewed David Chambers, the grandson of ex-Communist spy Whittaker Chambers, published in The American Conservative (USA) and The National Observer (Australia). In August, 2011 Vidal became a reviewer for the Historical Novels Review, the journal of the Historical Novel Society.

== Personal life and family ==
"Elena Maria Vidal" is a pen name chosen to honor her Spanish grandmother; Vidal's legal name is Mary-Eileen Russell. She is the daughter of the late John Charles Laughland and of Alice Strong Laughland. Among her cousins are British journalist John Laughland, Canadian novelist Jennifer Lanthier, and Canadian poet Kateri Lanthier. Vidal's great-grandfather was the socialist politician James Vint Laughland. She is also the cousin of actress and comedian Norma Jean.

In 1986, Vidal joined the Secular Order of Discalced Carmelites. She briefly explored the religious life by entering a Carmelite monastery in the late 1980s. She has described a trip to Lourdes, France in 1994 and a trip to Austria in 1995 as influencing her decision to write historical fiction. In November 1996, Vidal married businessman Michael J. Russell. She currently lives in Maryland with her family and has completed a historical novel called The Paradise Tree about her Irish ancestors which was published in October 2014 by Mayapple Books. The Paradise Tree has been listed by Kirkus Reviews as one of the top 20 indie books of 2014, and among the top 100 best books of the year, according to the December 2014 issue.
