= Max Teichmann =

Australian politician (1924–2008)

- Born: Max Edwin Teichmann; 10 August 1924; Melbourne, Australia
- Died: 29 November 2008 (aged 84); North Fitzroy, Melbourne, Australia
- Spouse: Jenny Teichman

Academic background
- Education: University of Melbourne; Balliol College, Oxford

Academic work
- Institutions: Monash University
- Military career
- Allegiance: Australia
- Branch: Australian Army
- Service years: 1942–?
- Theatre: World War II; Papua New Guinea

Max Edwin Teichmann (20 August 1924 – 29 November 2008) was an Australian academic and political commentator.

== Early years ==
Born in Melbourne to a German-born father, also Max, and an Adelaide-born mother, Kathleen, Teichmann grew up in the working-class suburb of Carlton during the Great Depression. After leaving school, he worked as a junior journalist, then in 1942 joined the Australian army and saw action in Papua New Guinea.

== Education ==
After the war, as an ex-serviceman, he enrolled in the University of Melbourne where he embarked on an academic career. He won a scholarship to Balliol College, Oxford, United Kingdom where he was taught by Isaiah Berlin, Max Beloff and John Plamenatz. While in the United Kingdom, Teichmann became involved in left-wing politics, joining Britain's Labour Party and Campaign for Nuclear Disarmament. He married the philosopher Jenny Teichman.

== Political commentary ==
In 1964, he returned to Australia and took up a post in the department of politics at Monash University. He became active in the anti-Vietnam War movement in Australia and counted among his friends leading Australian Labor Party identities such as Jim Cairns and Bill Hayden.

Teichmann later adopted more conservative views and he became a fierce critic of the Left in Australia. Writing in the Australian Financial Review on 19 July 1999, Christopher Pearson listed Teichmann as one of several contemporary Australian political commentators who had commenced on the Left but had become conservatives later on in their careers. Pearson asserted that "Teichmann's position evolved primarily in response to the Left". So much so that his "critique of parasitism in the institutional Left, old and new, made him a heretical presence at Monash".

== Columnist ==
Teichmann retired from Monash in 1989. He went on to work as a regular columnist with The Adelaide Review from the mid-1990s until 2002. He also regularly wrote articles for Quadrant, News Weekly and National Observer up until his death in November 2008.

== Bibliography ==
- Teichmann, Max, ed. (1966). Aspects of Australia's defence. Melbourne: Political Studies Association, Monash University.
- — (January–February 1996). "The culture of the permanent election". Quadrant. 40 (1–2): 48–50.
