= Ian Spry =

Australian lawyer

Ian Charles Fowell Spry, QC (1942–2018) was a Melbourne Queen's Counsel, legal author and academic.

He was the author of Equitable Remedies, a legal text on the law of equity which is used as a reference work in common law jurisdictions around the World. Sir Owen Dixon, former Chief Justice of the High Court of Australia, described the first edition (1971) as "the best legal book to have come out of Australia." It is a more opinionated book than one usually finds in law, in which Spry makes some pointed criticisms of the famous English and Australian equity judges of the past and present, including the High Court of Australia. He was awarded the degree of Doctor of Laws by the University of Melbourne for this work, which has been considered to be the standard Australian text on its subject.

In the 1970s, Spry studied Law at Monash University. He was also the founder editor of the Australian quarterly journal the National Observer from 1988 to 2005. The journal ceased publication in its print edition in 2009 and online in 2012.

Spry was the son of Brigadier Sir Charles Chambers Fowell Spry, CBE, DSO (26 June 1910 – 28 May 1994) who, from 1950 to 1970, was the second Director-General of Security, the head of the Australian Security Intelligence Organisation (ASIO).

In his personal life, Spry was a litigant in the High Court decision of Kennon v Spry. This was a landmark case that Spry lost to his ex-wife in a dispute involving family trusts. Following this event, some controversial letters were circulated criticizing the judges who made the decision, in which Spry appeared to accuse them of bias or incompetence.
