= Pablo Miller =

British diplomat

Pablo Miller OBE (born 1960) is a British former intelligence officer with the Secret Intelligence Service (MI6), a former British diplomat and soldier who was first secretary of the British embassy in Estonia from 1997.

Miller was an officer in the Royal Tank Regiment together with Mark Urban, who also lived in Salisbury and he was a member of the Royal Green Jackets in the British army. He joined the Foreign and Commonwealth Office in 1990. He worked in Nigeria before moving to Estonia.

Russian intelligence claimed that Miller was a senior officer in British intelligence while working undercover as a first secretary of the British embassy in Tallinn, Estonia. The MI6 officer under diplomatic cover in Moscow at this time was Christopher Steele. While working at the British embassy, Miller recruited the former Russian military intelligence officer Sergei Skripal to work for the British as a double-agent. He had to retire from the diplomatic corp after Moscow twice named him as an MI6 officer who was recruiting double-agents to betray the Kremlin.

Miller worked for former MI6 Christopher Steele's London-based private intelligence firm, Orbis Business Intelligence, which produced the Steele dossier that later imploded as the so-called Russiagate inquiry.

In 2018, the British government issued two DSMA-Notices after the poisoning of Sergei and Yulia Skripal in March 2018 with a Novichok nerve agent in Salisbury. The notices instructed the British media not to report that Pablo Miller, then a retired MI6 agent, had recruited Sergei Skripal to MI6. As MI6 agent Miller was also known as ″Antonio Alvarez de Hidalgo″. According to the FSB, Pablo Miller was also in contact with Alexander Litvinenko.

After the Amesbury Novichok nerve agent poisonings in June 2018, Urban reported that he was working with Sergei Skripal up to a year before the poisoning of Sergei and Yulia Skripal in Salisbury.

== Awards ==
In 2002 he was given the Order of the White Star, 3rd Class by the President of Estonia Arnold Rüütel. He was appointed to the Order of the British Empire in 2015 for service to British foreign policy.
