= National Observer (Australia) =

- Categories: News magazine
- Frequency: Quarterly
- Founded: 1988
- Final issue: Autumn 2009 (print)
- Company: Council for the National Interest
- Country: Australia
- Based in: Melbourne
- Language: English
- Website: www.nationalobserver.net
- ISSN: 1442-5548
- OCLC: 41041374

The National Observer (formerly known as Australia and World Affairs) was a quarterly current-affairs and politics magazine in Australia. It specialised in domestic and international politics, security-related challenges and issues of national cohesion.

== History and profile ==
The magazine was founded in 1988. It was renamed as National Observer in 1999. It was published on a quarterly basis and was part of the Council for the National Interest. The magazine was headquartered in Melbourne. Contributors to National Observer included many right-wing commentators from both Australia and overseas, including Tony Abbott, Nick Minchin, Patrick J. Buchanan, Bill Hayden, David Flint, B. A. Santamaria, Mark Steyn, Paul Gottfried, Hugh Morgan, Kenneth Minogue, John Stone, Hal G. P. Colebatch, Max Teichmann, R. J. Stove, Geoffrey Partington, Melvin J. Lasky, Kevin B. MacDonald, and Brian Crozier.

Until 2005 the magazine was edited by Ian Spry; from 2005 until early 2010 Philip Ayres edited it. During Ayres's editorship, the magazine ceased to appear in print form in Autumn 2009. It moved to an exclusively web-based format. John Ballantyne was the editor of the online magazine, which ceased publication completely in 2012.
