= Richard Weller =

Australian architect (1963–2025)

Richard Weller (1963 – 15 May 2025) was an Australian landscape architect and academic.

== Background ==
Weller graduated from the Bachelor of Landscape Architecture Program at the University of New South Wales, Sydney in 1986. From 2013 to 2023, he was Professor and Chair of Landscape Architecture at the University of Pennsylvania in Philadelphia, having succeeded James Corner. Weller also held the Martin and Margy Meyerson Chair of Urbanism at the University of Pennsylvania, was on the board of directors of the Landscape Architecture Foundation, Washington D.C., and was Creative Director of the award-winning LA+ Interdisciplinary Journal of Landscape Architecture. He was a Winthrop Professor of Landscape Architecture at the University of Western Australia, and director of the Australian Urban Design Research Centre (AUDRC). He held the role of adjunct professor at the University of Western Australia School of Design, and the University of New South Wales, School of Built Environment. He received a number of awards for teaching excellence including a 2012 national citation "for sustained commitment to inspiring and enabling students to engage creatively and critically with complex design problems". In 2017, and again in 2018, Weller was named by DesignIntelligence as one of the "25 most-admired educators" based on a comprehensive survey across the US design industry. "Weller demonstrates an intense engagement and commitment to students' academic and professional careers", according to the report. "He is advancing the profession through a critical look at past and current issues in ecology and design . . . shows humility and humanity in a challenging profession, and has the ability to always call us back to the biggest ideas that design needs to address." In 2020, Weller was inducted into the Academy of Fellows of the Council of Educators in Landscape Architecture (CELA). In 2023, Weller received the inaugural LAF Legacy Award from the Landscape Architecture Foundation in Washington D.C. In 2024, he received the President's Award from the Australian Institute of Landscape Architects “in recognition of his distinguished career as a globally renowned landscape architect, urbanist, and academic.”

Weller died on 15 May 2025, at the age of 61.

== Works ==
Weller was a landscape architect and former co-director (with Vladimir Sitta) of Australian landscape architecture firm Room 4.1.3. whose built projects include the "Garden of Australian Dreams" at the National Museum of Australia in Canberra, ACT. The built garden attracted controversy for its radical design. He was also part of the original design team for the Elizabeth Quay project in Perth, Western Australia.

Weller's design work has been exhibited in the Museum of Contemporary Art in Sydney (1998) as a finalist in the Seppelt Contemporary Art Awards. His work has also been exhibited at the Venice Biennale (2004, 2021), the MAXXI Gallery in Rome (2016), the Isabella Stewart Gardner Museum in Boston (2017), the Canadian Design Museum in Toronto (2018), and the Guggenheim Museum in New York (2020) as part of the "Countryside, The Future" exhibition curated by Rem Koolhaas. Weller exhibited as an invited participant in the central pavilion at the 2021 Venice Biennale di Architettura curated by Hashim Sarkis, at the 2022 Architecture Biennale Rotterdam, and at CAFA in Beijing (2023).

In 2002, Weller's design was selected as a finalist in the Pentagon Memorial competition in Washington, D.C. and in 2005 he was a finalist in the Tsunami Memorial competition in Thailand. His early work (1990 to 1995) as consultant to Berlin landscape architecture firm Muller, Knippschild Wehberg (now Lützow 7) was heavily awarded in European design competitions.

Weller's later projects included the Hotspot Cities Project, which maps conflict zones between urban growth and biodiversity, and the World Park Project, which proposes three recreational trails and related landscape restoration at a planetary scale. Weller's earlier work on urbanization and critical threats to biodiversity, “Atlas for the End of the World,” was published in National Geographic and Scientific American.

== Research and publications ==
Weller gave the Frederick Law Olmsted Memorial Lecture at the Harvard Graduate School of Design in 2011, and many invited lectures and addresses including at Milano Architecture Week (Milan, 2019), the first World Forum on Urban Forests (Mantova, 2018), and to the UN Secretariat of the Convention on Biological Diversity (Montreal, 2017). He was a regular commentator on planning and design issues. He is author of numerous books and over 100 single-authored papers. His publications include:

- Room 4.1.3: Innovations in Landscape Architecture (University of Pennsylvania Press, 2005)
- "An Art of Instrumentality: Thinking Through Landscape Urbanism" in Charles Waldheim (ed), The Landscape Urbanism Reader (Princeton Architectural Press, 2006)
- Boomtown 2050: Scenarios for a Rapidly Growing City (University of Western Australia Press, 2009)
- Made in Australia: The Future of Australian Cities (with Julian Bolleter) (UWA Publishing, 2013)
- The Atlas for the End of the World (2017), an ASLA award-winning website which audits the status of land use and urbanization in the most critically endangered bioregions on Earth.
- Design with Nature Now (Lincoln Institute of Land Policy, 2019).
- Beautiful China: Reflections on Landscape Architecture in Contemporary China (with Tatum Hands)(ORO Editions, 2020).
- The Landscape Project (with Tatum Hands)(AR+D Publishing, 2022).
- An Art of Instrumentality: The Landscape Architecture of Richard Weller (ORO Editions, 2023).
- To The Ends of the Earth: A Grand Tour for the 21st Century, Basel: Birkhäuser, January 2024, ISBN 9783035627930, OL 37572601W
