= John Stubbs (author) =

Author

John Norman Stubbs (2 February 1938 in Cunnamulla, Queensland – 25 May 2015 in Lismore, New South Wales) was an Australian political journalist, author and Labor staffer.

Stubbs worked as a political correspondent for The Australian, The Sydney Morning Herald and Brisbane's Sunday Sun among others and authored three non-fiction books.

He worked as a press secretary for Clyde Cameron when he was a minister in the Whitlam Government, and for Hugh Hudson, a minister in the South Australian government of Don Dunstan.

Stubbs co-authored Nest of Traitors: The Petrov Affair, with Nicholas Whitlam in 1974 about the Petrov Affair. He also wrote The Hidden People, Poverty in Australia and Hayden, a biography of Bill Hayden.

John Stubbs received a Walkley Award in 1995 for Most Outstanding Contribution to Journalism.

== Books ==
- John Stubbs, The Hidden People : Poverty in Australia, Lansdowne Press, 1966
- Nicholas Whitlam and John Stubbs, Nest of Traitors : The Petrov Affair, University of Queensland Press, Brisbane, 1974
- John Stubbs, Hayden, William Heinemann, 1989
