= National Civic Council =

Australian political lobby

The National Civic Council (NCC) is a conservative Christian lobby group in Australia, founded by B. A. Santamaria in the 1940s. The NCC publishes a weekly magazine, News Weekly.

The NCC promotes policy based on Santamaria's Catholic values including "the integrity of human life", protection of "the family unit", decentralism and patriotism (including economic). It is usually considered socially conservative, while in economics it is critical of both socialist and economic-rationalist trends. The group organised support for Tony Abbott before the spill motion in February 2015.

== History ==
The NCC evolved in 1957 from the Catholic Social Studies Movement (also known simply as "The Movement") which was founded in the early 1940s by prominent Catholic layman B.A. Santamaria. The Movement worked closely with the Industrial Groups, which were formed within the Australian Labor Party to combat the influence and infiltration of the Communist Party in trade unions. The Movement, and later the NCC, had close links with the original Democratic Labor Party.

The organisation's website states that its "primacies" are "The family as the basic unit of society," opposition to "excessive centralization," the "right to life" from conception to natural death, patriotism, and "Judeo-Christian values."

== Publications and influence ==
The NCC publishes a fortnightly magazine, News Weekly, and formerly a journal of religious opinion called AD2000 which ceased in 2017. Former national president, Patrick J. Byrne, is the author of two books, Transgender: One shade of grey, and The Little Grey book on Sex and Transgender. The previous former national president, Peter Westmore, was a candidate at the 1975 federal election for the original Democratic Labor Party. Westmore took over from the founder Santamaria in 1998.

The Australian Family Association (AFA) is an affiliate of the NCC which maintains a high profile on a range of social issues. (Not to be confused with the Australian Family Movement, which was created as a conservative Christian political party in the 1970s by some supporters of the AFA and the NCC). In 2014, the NCC represented at a "strengthening the family" conference organised to support the World Congress of Families.

The NCC emerged from the Labour movement as a grass roots response to radical elements within some Labor Party branches who were involved with the Communist Party of Australia.

While conservative on many social issues, the NCC is firmly opposed to so-called 'conservative economics' that which is associated with Liberal/National party reforms of this century (which followed Hawke/Keating reforms) best described as neo-liberal economics.

Tony Abbott, who was Australia's Prime Minister from 2013 to 2015, became interested in politics in 1976 after attending a National Civic Council conference. Abbott represented the Democratic Club in the 1970s, which was sponsored by the NCC. Gerard Henderson describes the NCC as Abbott's "original spiritual and political home in politics". Various media sources have reported that a NCC email campaign helped in part to secure Abbott's position as prime minister before the spill motion in February 2015. Senator Eric Abetz stated before the spill: "In the last few days the emails have been overwhelmingly flooding the office saying all this nonsense about leadership has gone far too far, and the emails are now overwhelmingly saying 'stick to the team you've got'". In 1999, Abetz was a speaker on "the family" at Family Council of Victoria (a "front" group dominated by the National Civic Council's Australian Family Association). Abetz also spoke at the NCC in November 2011.

== Organisation ==
The NCC has its national office in Melbourne, as well as ones in Brisbane and Perth. The current NCC national president is Luke McCormack and there are also a number of state presidents, who co-ordinate local groups in each state.

The NCC describes its task as:

to expose and counter four key hostile ideologies in defence of human life and the family, inherent human rights and Australia as an independent, free nation:

- Libertarianism, 'the right to do as I please', (e.g. unrestrained pursuit of pleasure or profit) in its cultural, economic and legal forms, undermines the natural family and a fair market economy;
- Chinese communism, the ideology behind Beijing's aggressive extension of power into the Asia Pacific region, and beyond;
- Fluid gender ideology that is weaponising laws that attack the foundations of a tolerant democracy – freedom of speech, association and religion; and
- Radical environmentalism that goes beyond protecting the environment to undermining both the energy needs of the nation and the development of important industries.

The NCC describes it's "5 Defining Principles" as:

- "The natural family as the basic unit of society";
- "Decentralisation of population, economic power (giving preference to the family farm and small/family business over larger corporations) and political power (federal government should not do what states can do, states should not do what local government can do).";
- "The integrity of the individual, including full legal protection of the right to life for all human beings from natural conception to natural death, and economic structures that ensure a just worker's wage.";
- "Patriotism (as opposed to nationalism)";
- and "Judeo-Christian virtues that provide the moral cement to hold society together, as opposed to relativism and hedonistic individualism that undermine familial ties and dissolve the ties that bind a society together."

== Controversy ==
In November 2014, former national president, Peter Westmore, attended his daughter Trish's marriage to her female partner Christy in New Zealand, where same-sex marriage was made legal in 2013. He said his daughter's wedding had his blessing: "She always has my blessing in everything she does". Asked on 24 March 2015 if he still supported the NCC's opposition to same-sex marriage, he said: "Of course I do". Westmore did not respond when queried about the apparent inconsistency between his personal and his political positions on the issue. He asked Fairfax Media to "respect" his family's privacy.

== See also ==
- Catholic social teaching
- Christian democracy
- Distributism
- Political catholicism
