= D-Notice =

UK request to not publish information

In the United Kingdom, D-Notices, officially known since 2015 as DSMA-Notices (Defence and Security Media Advisory Notices), are official requests to news editors not to publish or broadcast items on specified subjects for reasons of national security.

DSMA-Notices were originally called Defence Notices (abbreviated to D-Notice) from their inception in 1912 to 1993, and DA-Notices (Defence Advisory Notices) from 1993 until the mid-2010s.

A similar D-Notice system was previously operational in Australia, but has fallen into disuse. Sweden maintained a similar "grey notice" system during World War II, as described below.

== United Kingdom ==
In the UK, the original D-Notice system was introduced in 1912 and run as a voluntary system by a joint committee headed by an Assistant Secretary of the War Office and a representative of the Press Association. D-Notices are only advisory requests and are not legally enforceable; hence, news editors can choose not to abide by them. However, they are generally complied with by the media.

In 1971, all existing D-Notices were cancelled and replaced by standing D-notices, which gave general guidance on what might be published and what was discouraged; and what would require further advice from the secretary of the Defence, Press and Broadcasting Advisory Committee (DPBAC). In 1993, the notices were renamed DA-Notices (Defence Advisory Notices).

One of the recommendations resulting from the 2015 review of the D-notice system included the renaming of the system to the Defence and Security Media Advisory (DSMA) Committee. This name reflected better the longstanding inclusion of the work of the intelligence agencies. In 2017, the notices were reworded and then reorganized into the following categories:

- DSMA-Notice 01: Military Operations, Plans & Capabilities
- DSMA-Notice 02: Nuclear and Non-Nuclear Weapon Systems and Equipment
- DSMA-Notice 03: Military Counter-Terrorist Forces, Special Forces and Intelligence Agency Operations, Activities and Communication Methods and Techniques
- DSMA-Notice 04: Physical Property and Assets
- DSMA-Notice 05: Personnel and their Families who work in Sensitive Positions

According to an article in Defence Viewpoints, between 1997 and 2008 there were "30 occasions where the committee secretary has written to specific editors when a breach in the D-Notice guidelines is judged to have occurred".

=== Known uses ===
In 1967, a political scandal known as the D-notice affair occurred, when Prime Minister Harold Wilson made an attack on the Daily Express, accusing it of breaching two D-Notices which advised the press not to publish material which might damage national security. When the newspaper asserted it had not been advised of any breach, an inquiry was set up under a committee of privy counsellors. The committee found against the government, whereupon the government refused to accept its findings on the disputed article, prompting press outrage and the resignation of the secretary of the D-notice committee.

The Guardian has reported that in 1971, four days following the Baker Street robbery, a D-notice was issued, requesting that reporting be discontinued for reasons of national security. It is claimed that some security boxes contained embarrassing or nationally sensitive material. However, an investigation some years later showed that a request had never been made to the D-notice committee. The Times was still reporting about the case over two months later.

The BBC, in a podcast serial on the case, has reported that a D-Notice was issued in 1992 requesting restricted national coverage on developments in the kidnapping of Stephanie Slater, a woman taken from Leeds and held for ransom.

In 2004 and 2005, three blanket letters were sent to newspapers advising against publication of countermeasures used against roadside ambushes of British forces in the Iraq War.

In 2008, a D-Notice was issued to prevent further disclosure relating to sensitive anti-terror documents left on a train by a senior civil servant.

On 8 April 2009, the committee issued a D-Notice in relation to sensitive anti-terror documents photographed when Assistant Commissioner Bob Quick arrived at 10 Downing Street for talks about current police intelligence.

On 25 November 2010, just prior to the publication of the United States diplomatic cables by WikiLeaks, the committee issued a D-Notice, which Index on Censorship said "effectively ... [asks that it] be briefed by newspaper editors before any new revelations are published". WikiLeaks tweeted that the "UK Government has issued a 'D-Notice' warning to all UK news editors, asking to be briefed on upcoming WikiLeaks stories". Simon Bucks, the vice chair of DPBAC, wrote that the tweet was "inaccurate and reflect[s] a serious misunderstanding of the DA-Notice system".

In October 2013, Prime Minister David Cameron made a veiled threat to newspapers over the reporting of Edward Snowden's NSA and GCHQ leaks, stating in Parliament that the government might use "injunctions or D-Notices or the other tougher measures" to restrain publication of leaked classified information if newspapers did not voluntarily stop publishing them.

In 2017, a D-Notice was issued to British journalists regarding revealing the author of the controversial Steele dossier alleging collusion between Donald Trump and the Russian government during the 2016 presidential election. Multiple British outlets ignored this advisory and revealed his name anyway, including BBC News, The Daily Telegraph and The Guardian.

On 7 March 2018 and on 14 March 2018, two notices were issued to protect MI6 in relation to some aspects of the Skripal affair. In the early 1990s Sergei Skripal was recruited by Pablo Miller, the MI6 agent inside the UK embassy to Estonia in Tallinn. The MI6 officer under diplomatic cover in Moscow at this time was Christopher Steele. Miller was also the handler of Skripal after he went to jail and was released by Russia in a spy swap. Both lived in Salisbury. Steele and Miller worked for Orbis Business Intelligence which compiled the controversial Steele dossier, comprising 17 memos written in 2016 alleging misconduct and conspiracy between Donald Trump's presidential campaign and the Putin administration. While the precise nature of the relations between Skripal, Miller, and Steele were hidden, enough was already known to raise questions about Skripal's ongoing involvement with British intelligence.

== Australia ==
A voluntary system of D-Notices was also used in Australia starting in 1952 during the Cold War period; these were issued by the Defence, Press and Broadcasting Committee. At the first meeting of the Committee, eight D-Notices were issued covering atomic tests in Australia, aspects of naval shipbuilding, official ciphering, the number and deployment of Centurion tanks, troop movements in the Korean War, weapons and equipment information not officially released, aspects of air defence and certain aerial photographs.

In 1974, the number of D-Notices was reduced to four, covering:

1. Technical information regarding navy, army and air force weapons, weapons systems, equipment and communications systems;
2. Air operational capability and air defences;
3. Whereabouts of Vladimir Petrov and Evdokia Petrova; and
4. Ciphering and monitoring activities.

A fifth D-Notice relating to the Australian Secret Intelligence Service (ASIS) was issued in 1977.

In 1982, D-Notices were again revised to four.

- D Notice 1: Capabilities of the Australian Defence Force, Including Aircraft, Ships, Weapons, and Other Equipment;
- D Notice 2: Whereabouts of Vladimir Petrov and Evdokia Petrova;
- D Notice 3: Signals Intelligence and Communications Security; and
- D Notice 4: Australian Secret Intelligence Service (ASIS).

The Defence, Press and Broadcasting Committee has not met since 1982 although the D-Notice system remains the administrative responsibility of the Minister for Defence. The D-Notice system fell out of common use at the end of the Cold War but remained in force. The 1995 Commission of Inquiry into the Australian Secret Intelligence Service reported that newspapers confessed ignorance that the D-Notice system was still operating when it was drawn to their attention in 1993 and 1994.

On 26 November 2010, Australian Attorney-General Robert McClelland sent a letter to heads of Australian media and other organisations proposing the creation of a new system similar to the D-Notice system. The proposed National Security Legislation Amendment Bill (2014) has been described as an extension of the D-Notice system that would subject journalists who reveal details of intelligence operations to criminal penalties.

== Sweden ==
During the Second World War, the government agency Statens Informationsstyrelse distributed grey notices ("grå lappar") to the media. The notes requested the media not to report on certain events that were not to become public knowledge for political or military reasons. During the war, a total of 260 grey notices were distributed to the media.

== In popular culture ==
The use of the D-Notice is demonstrated and referenced several times in the first episode of the Black Mirror television series, first aired in 2011. The episode is titled "The National Anthem" and within it the UK government imposes a D-Notice to try to stifle a controversial ransom demand that the (fictional) prime minister have sex with a pig to secure the release of a member of the royal family.

In his 1968 novel Web of Silence, John Wainwright writes “A ‘D Notice’ gets slapped on the inquiry... The newspapers are gagged from the word ‘go’.” After that, “slapping” became the mot juste for D-Notices in popular culture.

In the comic book series Transmetropolitan (1997), a legally binding type of D-Notice is issued by the US President in an attempt to prevent the main character, gonzo journalist Spider Jerusalem, from exposing police corruption and a government-sponsored massacre.

The film Defence of the Realm (1986) illustrates the implications of the D-Notice protocols.

In the film The Bank Job (2008), MI5 discusses issuing a D-Notice about sensitive photos stolen from a safe deposit box during a bank heist.

In the film Official Secrets (2019), a journalist from The Observer questions whether a D-Notice would be applied to a story which exposes intelligence leaked by a GCHQ employee.

In series 2 (2021) of the Sky One television drama series COBRA, the Foreign Secretary points out that a D-Notice could be issued to prevent unwanted journalistic reporting, and has it pointed out to him by the Head of MI5 that they are now called DSMA-Notices.

In series 4 Episode 1 (2017) of Sherlock, Mycroft Holmes mentions putting out a D-Notice to prevent any unauthorised disclosure of the contents of the meeting held behind closed doors.

In series 2 Episode 2 of the BBC television series The Capture (2019), at 32 minutes in, DSU Gemma Garland (played by Lia Williams) mentions 'you can't broadcast it; we'll slap a D-Notice on it.'

In series 2, Episode 3 of the ITV television drama Trigger Point, Commander John Francis (portrayed by Julian Ovenden) makes a veiled threat to issue a D-Notice, to silence a journalist and their editor following an explosive device being sent to the journalist's place of work. The editor acknowledges that they are not legally binding.

== See also ==
- Classified information § Australia
- Classified information in the United Kingdom
- Media blackout
- Prior restraint
- Right to be forgotten, sometimes called a "G-notice"
- Super-injunctions in English law
