= Roland Teichmann =

Director of Austrian film institute

Roland Teichmann (born 19 April 1970 in Salzburg) is the director of the Österreichisches Filminstitut (Austrian Film Institute).
