= Charles Spry =

Australian soldier and public servant

Brigadier Sir Charles Spry CBE, DSO
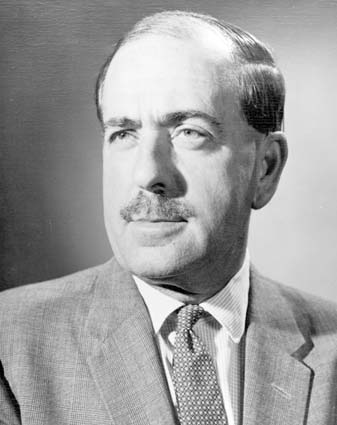
- Charles Spry in 1950

2nd Director-General of Security
- In office 6 July 1950 – 21 January 1970
- Prime Minister: Robert Menzies
- Preceded by: Geoffrey Reed
- Succeeded by: Peter Barbour

Personal details
- Born: Charles Chambers Fowell Spry; 26 June 1910 Brisbane, Queensland
- Died: 28 May 1994 (aged 83) Melbourne, Victoria
- Spouse: Kathleen Edith Hull
- Education: Royal Military College, Duntroon
- Occupation: Army officer
- Nickname: "Silent Charles"

Military service
- Allegiance: Australia
- Branch/service: Australian Army
- Years of service: 1929–1954
- Rank: Brigadier
- Unit: 6th Division
- Battles/wars: North-West Frontier; Second World War
- Awards: Knight Bachelor; Commander of the Order of the British Empire; Distinguished Service Order

Brigadier Sir Charles Chambers Fowell Spry CBE, DSO (26 June 1910 – 28 May 1994) was an Australian soldier and public servant. From 1950 to 1970 he was the second Director-General of Security, the head of the Australian Security Intelligence Organisation (ASIO).

== Early life ==
Charles Spry was born on 26 June 1910 in Brisbane. He attended local state schools and then Brisbane Grammar School. At the age of 18, he enrolled in the Royal Military College, Duntroon, from which he graduated in 1931.

== Military career ==
After graduating from Duntroon, Spry served as an infantry officer in Hobart and Sydney, where he earned the nickname "Silent Charles" while adjutant of the Sydney University Regiment. From 1935 to 1936, he served in the British Army in India, where he joined in operations with the Duke of Wellington's Regiment in the Northwest Frontier.

== Australian Security Intelligence Organisation ==
ASIO's first Director-General, Geoffrey Reed, had been due to retire in February 1950, but his appointment was extended until the Menzies Government could find a suitable replacement. At the time, Spry was the Director of Military Intelligence in the army, and was seconded to ASIO on 6 July 1950, with an option to remain in, and return to, the army if he so desired. He was discharged from the army on 15 June 1954, and his secondment ceased on 20 August, with Spry appointed solely to ASIO.

Spry was head of ASIO during the Petrov affair when Vladimir Petrov, Third Secretary of the Soviet Embassy in Canberra, defected to Australia in 1954. Spry authorised the payment of £5,000 to Petrov to encourage his defection and as payment for documents he obtained from the Soviet embassy. Spry also instructed ASIO officers to seize Petrov's wife, Evdokia Petrova (also a Soviet intelligence officer), from a plane at Darwin Airport, where she was in the custody of Soviet Interior Ministry (MVD) officials being transported back to Moscow.

In October 1968, Spry wrote to CIA director Richard Helms recommending against public disclosure of an investigation into anonymous phone calls to the Canberra Embassy before and after the assassination of John F. Kennedy, which was held by the Warren Commission.

Spry remained Director-General for nearly twenty years, only deciding to retire in 1969 on medical grounds after a heart attack, and doubts about serving under Prime Minister John Gorton.

== Honours ==
Spry was made a Companion of the Distinguished Service Order on 23 December 1943, for his actions in the South West Pacific theatre of World War II, specifically for maintaining the flow of supplies in Papua New Guinea.

He was made a Commander of the Order of the British Empire (CBE) on 31 May 1956, and knighted on 1 January 1964. The citations for both these honours simply stated "Public service". Barrister and academic Ian "Sam" Spry QC, was Sir Charles's son.

== Legacy ==
In July 2015, a documentary film about Spry entitled I, Spry – The rise and fall of a master spy aired on ABC Television in Australia.

Government offices
Preceded by Geoffrey Reed	Director-General of Security; 1950–1970	Succeeded by Peter Barbour
