= News Media Association =

British trade association

The News Media Association (NMA) is a trade body which styles itself as "the voice of national, regional and local news media organisations in the UK". It was created in 2014 by a merger between the Newspaper Society and the Newspaper Publishers' Association. The Newspaper Society, which represented local papers in the United Kingdom, was founded in 1836, and the Newspaper Publishers' Association, which represented national publishers, in 1904. The current chief executive is Owen Meredith.

The NMA promotes the interests of news media publishers to government, regulatory authorities, industry bodies, and other organisations whose work affects the industry. Members include The Sun, The Guardian, the Daily Mail, the Daily Mirror, The Yorkshire Post, the Kent Messenger, the Monmouthshire Beacon, and the Manchester Evening News. The organisation represents digital as well as print media and supports the Independent Publishers' Forum.

The NMA's policy focuses on sustaining the news media sector and safeguarding press freedom in the UK. Current policy objectives include introducing short-term measures to support local news media's transition to a sustainable digital-first business model and campaigning for the Digital Markets, Competition and Consumer Bill to be enacted without delay. This aims to give the Digital Markets Unit the powers to tackle structural problems caused by tech platforms in the digital marketplace and promote genuine competition.

David Newell, former NMA CEO, was appointed an OBE in the Queen's Birthday Honours in June 2017 for services to the newspaper and publishing industries.

In April 2020, the NMA announced a partnership with the Government on "a three-month advertising partnership to help keep the public safe and the nation united throughout the Covid-19 pandemic".
