= Eva Sitta =

Czech-Australian actress

- Born: Eva Píchová; 17 August 1954 (age 71); Krnov, Czechoslovakia
- Other names: Eva Sitteová
- Occupation: Actress
- Notable work: Stín létajícího ptáčka Island; The Petrov Affair

Eva Sitta (née Píchová, married Sitteová; born 17 August 1954), is a Czech-born Australian actress.

== Life and career ==
Eva Píchová was born on 17 August 1954 in Krnov. She studied at Janáček Academy of Performing Arts and began her acting career in Czechoslovakia becoming a well known stage actress and appearing in films such as Stín létajícího ptáčka aka The Shadow Of The Flying Bird (1977) for which she won a major Czech acting award. (Note: Bruce Kirkland of the Toronto Sun calls it "the Czech version of an Oscar".)

Sitta and her architect husband Vladimir migrated to Australia in 1981.

Sitta's Australian screen roles include a lead role of Czech-Australian Eva in the 1989 film Island, and featuring in the miniseries The Petrov Affair as Evdokia Petrov and the TV movie Displaced Persons as Annette,

Her stage roles include As Much Trouble As Talking at Belvoir St Downstairs Theatre in 1988, The Usherette at Third Eye in 1996, The Human Voice at Theatre Basilica in 1989 and the La Mama Theatre in 2000, and Cyanide at Five at the Bondi Pavilion Theatre in 2009 which she also directed.
