= Jenny Teichman =

Australian-British philosopher

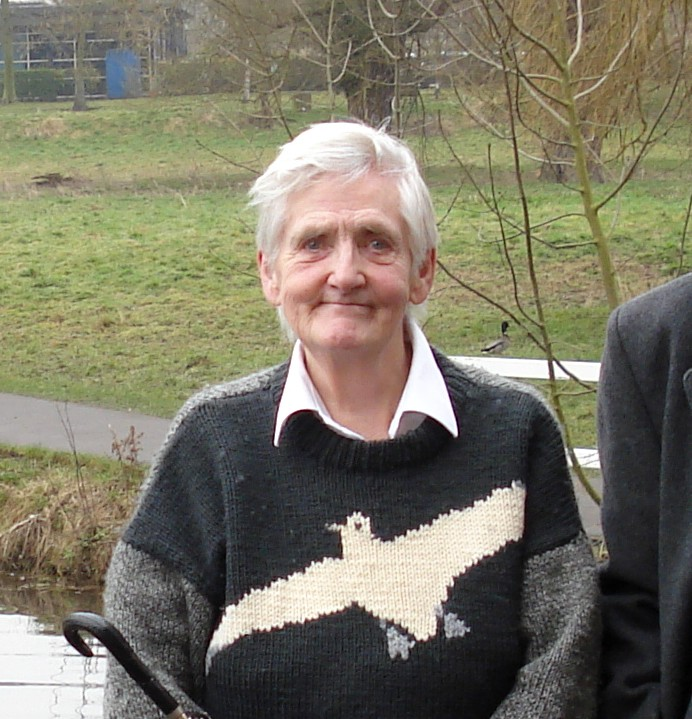
- Born: Jenny Jorgensen; March 29, 1930; Melbourne, Australia
- Died: 12 September 2018 (aged 88)
- Spouse: Max Teichmann

Academic work
- Institutions: Murray Edwards College, Cambridge; Somerville College, Oxford

Jenny Teichman (29 March 1930 – 12 September 2018) was an Australian-British philosopher, writing mostly on ethics. She was born Jenny Jorgensen in Melbourne, Australia, in 1930 and grew up in the Melbourne outer suburb of Belgrave. Her uncle was Justus Jorgensen, founder of the artists' colony of Montsalvat, outside Melbourne. She married the lecturer and political commentator Max Teichmann.

She was a research fellow at Somerville College, Oxford, from 1957 until 1960, where she was influenced by G. E. M. Anscombe. She taught mostly at Murray Edwards College, Cambridge, formerly known as New Hall, where she became an Emeritus Fellow. She also taught for shorter periods in Australia, Canada and the USA.

In ethics she defended the sacredness of human life (in a not necessarily religious sense) and was critical of the views of Peter Singer.

She died on 12 September 2018.

== Bibliography ==
=== Books ===
- Teichman, Jenny (1974). The mind and the soul : an introduction to the philosophy of mind. London: Routledge & Kegan Paul.
- Illegitimacy, Blackwell & Cornell UP 1982
- Pacifism & the Just War, Blackwell 1986
- Philosophy & the Mind, Blackwell 1988
- Philosophy: a Beginners Guide (with Katherine Evans) Blackwell 1991, 1995, 1999 (translations in Polish, Spanish, Russian, Korean, Chinese & Georgian)
- Social Ethics a Students Guide, Blackwell 1996 (translations in Spanish, Indonesian, Korean & Polish)
- Ethics and Reality Ashgate, 2001
- Philosophers' Hobbies and other Essays [27 short papers] illustrated by Michael Jorgensen, Blackjack Press, Carlton, 2003.
- The Philosophy of War & Peace, Imprint Academic, 2006

==== Anthologies ====
- Intention & Intentionality: Essays in Honour of GEM Anscombe (with Cora Diamond) Harvester Press 1979
- An Introduction to Modern European Philosophy (with Graham White) Macmillan 1995 and 1998

=== Book reviews ===
Date	Review article	Work(s) reviewed
1995	Teichman, Jenny (October 1995). "Seeing the moral world clearly". Books. Quadrant. 39 (10): 81–82.	Gormally, Luke, ed. (1994). Moral truth and moral tradition : essays in honour of Peter Geach and Elizabeth Anscombe. Dublin: Four Courts Press.
