= Vladimir Sitta =

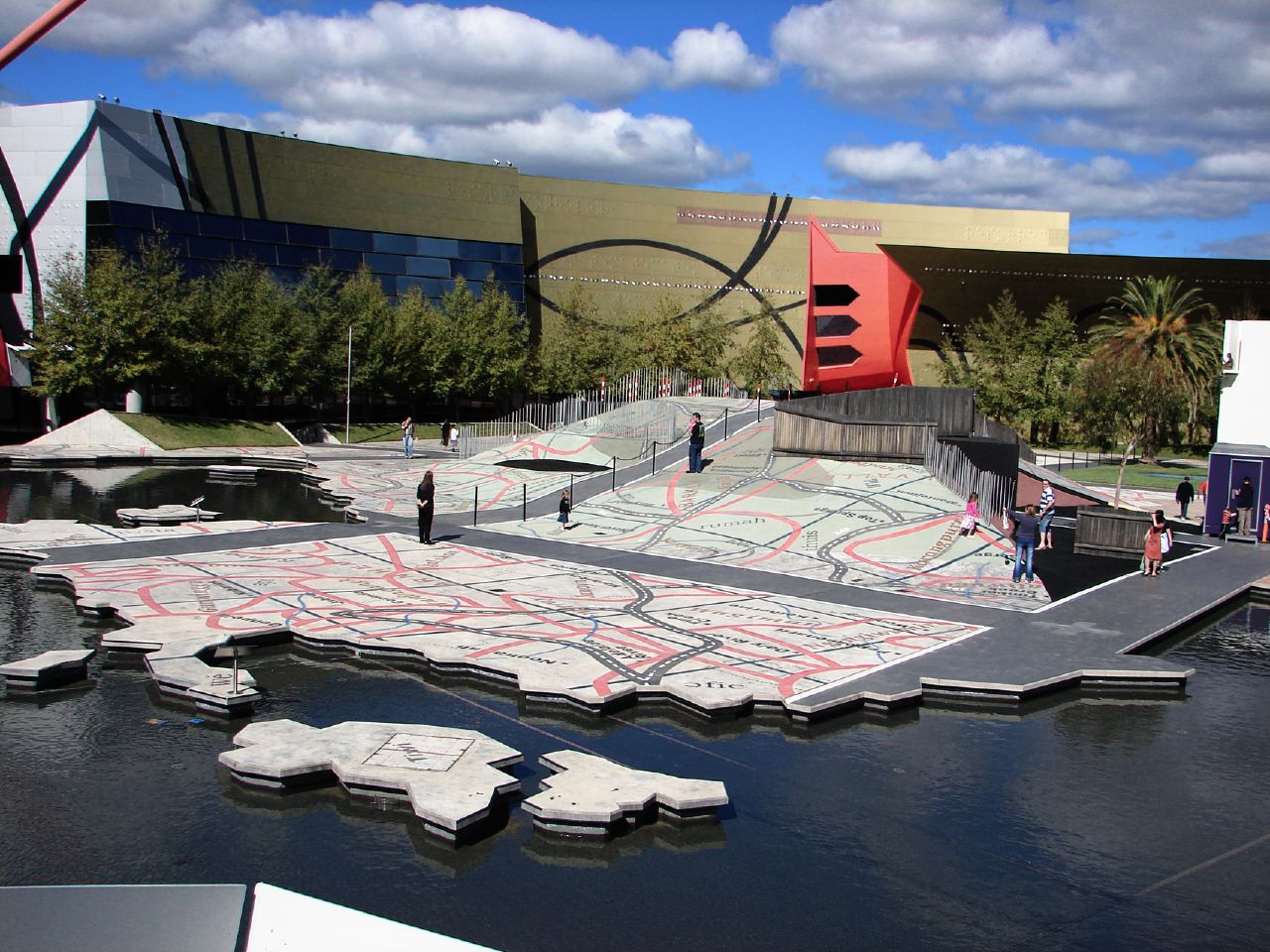
The Garden of Australian Dreams at the National Museum of Australia, Canberra

Vladimir (Tom) Sitta is a landscape architect. He was born in Brno, then in Czechoslovakia (now in the Czech Republic), where he trained as a landscape architect. After working in Czechoslovakia for 7 years, he moved to West Germany in 1979. He has made his permanent home in Australia since 1981.

He established Terragram, a firm of landscape architects, in 1986, and was a co-founder of Room 4.1.3 in 1998, with Richard Weller, a professor at the University of Western Australia (now Professor and Chair of Landscape Architecture at the University of Pennsylvania). Their firms are known for their innovative - even iconoclastic - designs, often introducing extensive planting into urban projects - a form of landscape urbanism. Their landscaping schemes have won many design competitions and prizes. Built projects include the Garden of Australian Dreams at the National Museum of Australia in Canberra, and it also worked on Fusionpolis in Singapore (jointly with Oculus).

Sitta won the state of Berlin's Peter Joseph Lenné Prize in 1981 and 1986, and won the President's Award of the Australian Institute of Landscape Architects in 2002.

Aitta is married to Eva Sitta, a Czech actress and they have one son, Adam.
