= Scottish Daily Newspaper Society =

The Scottish Daily Newspaper Society (SDNS) was the trade body representing the major daily newspaper publishers of Scotland. Representing a total of 18 titles, together they accounted for aggregate weekly sales of 10 million in 2008.

Established in 1915, the Society was based in Edinburgh.

In 2009, the Scottish Daily Newspaper Society amalgamated with the Scottish Newspaper Publishers Association, a similar trade body for weekly and biweekly newspapers, to form the Scottish Newspaper Society.

== Member companies ==
- Aberdeen Journals
- Associated Newspapers
- DC Thomson & Co Ltd
- News International Newspapers (Scotland) Ltd
- Newsquest (Herald & Times) Ltd
- Scottish Daily Record & Sunday Mail Ltd
- The Scotsman Publications Ltd

== See also ==
- List of newspapers in Scotland
