= Sabina Teichman =

American painter (1905–1983)

Sabina Teichman (1905–1983) was an American painter. Her work is included in the collections of the Whitney Museum of American Art and the Carnegie Museum of Art.
