= Sergei Skripal =

Russian intelligence officer (born 1951)

- Сергей Скрипаль
- Born: 23 June 1951 (age 75); Kaliningrad Oblast, Russian SFSR, Soviet Union
- Citizenship: Russia; United Kingdom
- Spouse: Lyudmila Koshelnik (died 2012)
- Children: 2

Sergei Viktorovich Skripal (Russian: Сергей Викторович Скрипаль, pronounced [sʲɪrˈɡʲej ˈvʲiktərəvʲɪtɕ skrʲɪˈpalʲ]; born 23 June 1951) is a former Russian military intelligence officer who acted as a double agent for the United Kingdom's intelligence services during the 1990s and early 2000s. In December 2004, he was arrested by Russia's Federal Security Service (FSB) and later tried, convicted of high treason, and sentenced to 13 years in prison. He settled in the United Kingdom in 2010 following the Illegals Programme spy swap. He holds both Russian and British citizenship.

On 4 March 2018, he and his daughter Yulia, a Russian citizen who was visiting him from Moscow, were poisoned with a Russian-developed Novichok nerve agent, and were admitted to Salisbury District Hospital in a critical condition. The poisoning was investigated by the British intelligence service as an attempted murder.

On 29 March 2018, Yulia was reported to be out of critical condition, and was "conscious and talking". A week later, on 6 April, it was announced that Sergei Skripal was no longer in critical condition. He was discharged from hospital on 18 May 2018.

== Early years ==
Sergei Skripal was born in Kaliningrad, Kaliningrad Oblast, Russian SFSR, on 23 June 1951. His father worked for a land improvement contractor, while his mother was employed with the local Council of Deputies. He grew up in the town of Ozyorsk, also in Kaliningrad Oblast.

== Education, military intelligence ==
In 1972, Skripal completed the Zhdanov military engineering school in Kaliningrad, located in the village of Borisovo (formerly Kraußen (Königsberg)) with the qualification of a sapper-paratrooper. He then studied at the Moscow Military Engineering Academy and subsequently served in the Soviet Airborne Troops where he was deployed to Afghanistan during the Soviet–Afghan War under the command of Boris Gromov.

Skripal was co-opted to the military intelligence (GRU) from the Airborne Troops. In the early 1990s, he was posted as a GRU officer at the embassy in Malta. In 1994, he obtained a position in the military attaché′s office in Madrid, Spain. In 1995, according to the FSB and other sources, while in Spain, he was recruited to British intelligence by British intelligence agent Pablo Miller posing as Antonio Alvarez de Hidalgo. According to intelligence sources cited by The Times in March 2018, Skripal was first spotted for potential development as an asset by Spanish intelligence but was approached by the British recruiter around July 1995 and was given the codename 'Forthwith'. According to the FSB, Pablo Miller was also involved in efforts to recruit other Russian assets and was in contact with Alexander Litvinenko.

In 1996, due to his diabetes, Skripal was sent back to Moscow, where he went on to work in the GRU headquarters and for a while was acting director of the GRU personnel department. Skripal held the rank of colonel when he retired, due to his inadequate health condition, in 1999. He continued to make trips to Spain, where he had a house near Málaga at his disposal, provided by his handlers.

According to Russian prosecutors, he began working for the United Kingdom's Secret Intelligence Service (MI6) in 1995 and passed on state secrets, such as the identities of Russian intelligence agents. After his retirement, he worked in the Household Department of the Russian foreign ministry, while continuing to work for MI6. He was alleged to have blown the cover of 300 Russian agents.

From 2001, Skripal worked in the Ministry of Municipalities of the Government of Moscow Oblast.

== Arrest and conviction ==
In December 2004, Skripal was arrested outside his house in Moscow's Krylatskoye District shortly after returning from Britain. In August 2006, he was convicted of spying for Britain. Prosecutors said he had been supplying MI6 with information since the 1990s and was paid $100,000 by MI6 for the information. Amid controversial circumstances, he was convicted under "Article 275" of the Russian Criminal Code (high treason in the form of espionage) by the Moscow Regional Military Court in a trial conducted behind closed doors. The prosecution, which was represented by Chief Military Prosecutor Sergei Fridinsky, argued for a 15-year sentence – instead of the 20-year maximum under Article 275 – in recognition of mitigating circumstances such as his cooperation with investigators.

Skripal was sentenced to 13 years in a high-security detention facility; he was also stripped of his military rank and decorations. The affair was not revealed to the public until after he was sentenced in August 2006. Skripal's lawyers appealed the sentence, which was upheld by the Military Collegium of the Supreme Court on 30 November 2006.

In July 2010, Skripal was pardoned by Russian president Dmitry Medvedev.

== Release and life in UK ==
On 9 July 2010, Skripal and three other Russians, who had been imprisoned for spying for the US, were freed as part of a spy swap. The four men were exchanged for ten Russian agents arrested in the United States as part of the Illegals Program. The UK government insisted on Skripal being included in the swap.

Skripal moved to Salisbury, Wiltshire, where he purchased a house in 2011. According to British security officials, Skripal continued to provide information to the UK and other Western intelligence agencies for a period after 2010.

Skripal's wife died in 2012 of disseminated endometrial cancer. His daughter returned to Moscow in 2014 and worked in sales. His son died aged 43 in March 2017, in unknown circumstances, on a visit to Saint Petersburg; Skripal's older brother died within the two years before the poisoning. Both Skripal's wife and his son are buried in a cemetery local to Salisbury.

In May 2018, The New York Times reported that Skripal, though retired, was "still in the game". While living in Britain, he had travelled to other countries, meeting with intelligence officials of the Czech Republic, Estonia, and Colombia, most likely discussing Russian spying techniques. In June 2016, he travelled to Estonia to meet local spies. Russian exile Valery Morozov told Channel 4 News Sergei Skripal was still working and in regular contact with military intelligence officers at the Russian Embassy.

While it was initially reported that Skripal was a close confidant of Christopher Steele, the British ex-spy who compiled the controversial Steele dossier, the Telegraph later reported an accusation from anonymous sources that this trail of evidence linking Skripal to Steele was fabricated by Russian Intelligence.

On 28 September 2018, the news magazine Focus reported, referring to a statement of a senior official from NATO's Allied Command Counter-Intelligence Unit (ACCI) in Mons, that until 2017 Skripal worked for four intelligence agencies of NATO countries. Skripal not only traveled, accompanied by MI6 officials to Prague, where he contributed information about the active Russian spy network, some agents Skripal knew from his active service. He provided information to the Estonian secret service in Tallinn, which enabled them to identify three active Russian undercover operatives. Skripal also worked with the Spanish secret service Centro Nacional de Inteligencia, informing the agency about the Russian organized crime in the Spanish region of Costa del Sol. All the trips were organized and approved by the British foreign intelligence service, MI6. Mark Urban reported that in 2017 Skripal was scheduled to meet with the Swiss Intelligence Service of the Federation.

== Poisoning ==
On 4 March 2018, Skripal and his 33-year-old daughter Yulia, who was visiting from Moscow, were found "slipping in and out of consciousness on a public bench" near a shopping centre in Salisbury by a doctor and nurse who were passing by. While at Salisbury District Hospital, they were put into induced comas to prevent organ damage.

Following the incident, health authorities checked 21 members of the emergency services and the public for symptoms. Two police officers were treated for possible minor symptoms, said to be itchy eyes and wheezing, while a third, Detective Sergeant Nick Bailey, who had been sent to Sergei Skripal's house, was in a serious condition. By 22 March 2018, Detective Sergeant Bailey had recovered enough to be discharged from the hospital, and by 15 January 2019, he returned to active duty.

On 29 March, Yulia was reported to be out of critical condition, "conscious and talking". On 7 April, the hospital reported that Sergei Skripal was improving rapidly and was no longer in a critical condition, two days after the improvement had been reported in Moscow following a phone call from his daughter. On 18 May 2018, Sergei Skripal was discharged from the hospital. The Director of Nursing said that further treatment would be provided outside the hospital and that treating the Skripals had been "a huge and unprecedented challenge".

The police declared a major incident as a number of agencies were involved. On 6 March, it was agreed under the National Counter Terrorism Policing Network that the Counter Terrorism Command based within the Metropolitan Police would take over the investigation from Wiltshire Police. Assistant Commissioner Mark Rowley, head of Counter Terrorism Policing, appealed for witnesses to the incident following a COBR meeting chaired by Home Secretary Amber Rudd.

On 12 March 2018, Prime Minister Theresa May identified the nerve agent used in the attack as a Russian-developed nerve agent Novichok and demanded explanation from the Russian government. Two days later, May said that Russia was responsible for the incident and announced the expulsion of 23 Russian diplomats in retaliation.

Russia said that its diplomats were denied access to both Sergei Skripal and his daughter, who is a Russian national. On 31 March 2018 the BBC reported that the UK was considering the Russian Embassy's request, 'in line with its obligations under international and domestic law.'

On 6 April, the Home Office rejected the visa application of Sergei Skripal's niece, Viktoria Skripal, because it "did not comply with the immigration rules". Viktoria Skripal had intended to travel to Britain to take Yulia back to Russia.

On 30 June 2018, two British Nationals were hospitalized by chemical poisoning in Amesbury, 8 miles (13 km) from Salisbury where Skripal had been attacked. One victim died in the hospital. Police determined they were poisoned by the same Novichok nerve agent used to attempt to assassinate Sergei and his daughter, and Home Secretary Sajid Javid told the House of Commons that the victims had likely been poisoned by the improperly discarded nerve agent used to attack Sergei.

On 16 February 2019 The Sunday Times reported, without identifying sources, that Sergei Skripal "has suffered a deterioration in his health and is being treated by doctors".

On 7 June 2020, The Sunday Times reported that Sergei and his daughter had been settled in New Zealand under new identities. A few weeks later, the New Zealand Herald raised several doubts about the report.
