= News Weekly =

Australian current affairs magazine

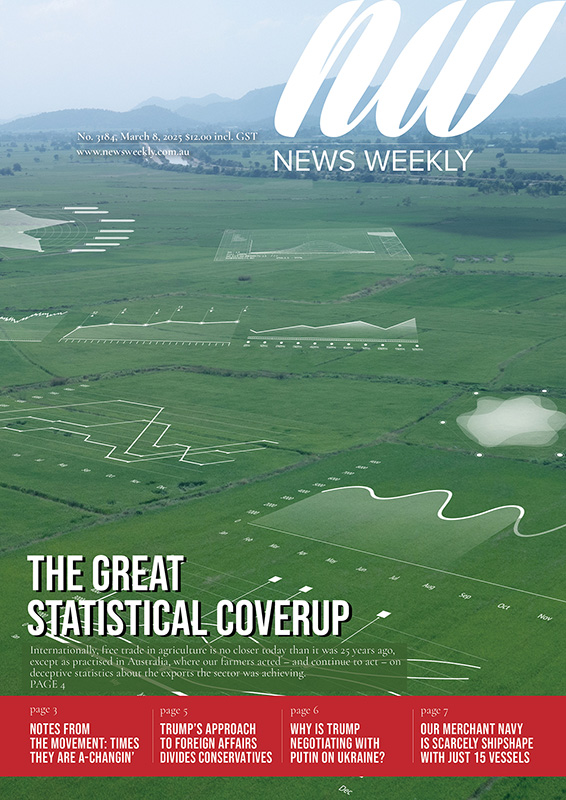
- Cover of March 2025 issue
- Editor: Peter Kelleher
- Frequency: Fortnightly
- Publisher: National Civic Council
- Founded: 1941; 85 years ago (former title: Freedom)
- Country: Australia
- Based in: Balwyn, Victoria
- Website: www.newsweekly.com.au

News Weekly is an Australian current affairs magazine headquartered in Balwyn, Victoria. It is published by the National Civic Council, a Christian lobby group, and operates offices in Queensland, New South Wales, Western Australia and South Australia.

News Weekly provides analysis of current cultural, social, political, educational, and economic trends, domestically and internationally, focusing on ethics.

== History and profile ==
News Weekly was founded by B. A. Santamaria and first published in September 1943, under the name Freedom. It later changed its name to Australia's national news-weekly, and adopted its current name in 1946–47.

News Weekly adheres to the five primacies of the National Civic Council: "natural family as the basic unit of society", decentralisation, "integrity of the individual", patriotism, and "Judeo-Christian virtues".

According to the Kempsey Library listing, News Weekly provides analysis of current cultural, social, political, educational, and economic trends in Australia, focusing on ethics.

In 1955, it had a circulation of 30,000 copies.

Associated groups include the Thomas More Centre and the Australian Family Association.
