= B. A. Santamaria =

Australian political activist and journalist

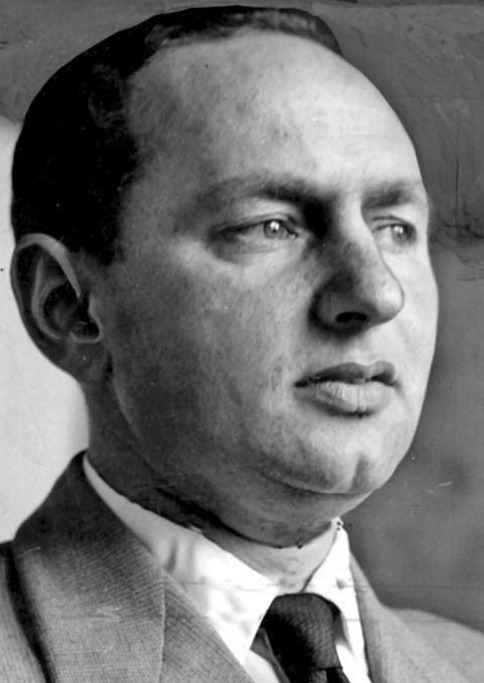
- Santamaria, c. 1950s
- Born: Bartholomew Augustine Santamaria; 14 August 1915; Brunswick, Victoria, Australia
- Died: 25 February 1998 (aged 82); Kew, Victoria, Australia
- Burial place: Bundoora Cemetery
- Citizenship: British subject (until 1949); Australian
- Education: University of Melbourne
- Political party: Labor (until 1955)
- Children: 8

Bartholomew Augustine Santamaria (14 August 1915 – 25 February 1998), usually known as B. A. Santamaria or Bob Santamaria and sometimes writing under the pseudonym John Williams, was an Australian anti-communist political activist and journalist. A Roman Catholic, he was a guiding influence in the founding of the Democratic Labor Party (DLP), the party that split from the Labor Party (ALP) in the 1950s.

== Early and family life ==
Santamaria was born on 14 August 1915 in Brunswick, Victoria. He was the first of five children born to Maria (née Costa) and Joseph Santamaria. His parents were Sicilian immigrants from the small island of Salina, one of the Aeolian Islands. His father had arrived in Australia in 1893 and became a grocer and fruiterer in Brunswick.

Santamaria was educated at St Ambrose's Catholic Primary School in Brunswick, behind his father's shop, and later at St Joseph's College in North Melbourne by the Christian Brothers. He finished his secondary education at St Kevin's College as dux of the school. One of his teachers, Francis Maher, belonged to a newly founded Roman Catholic association, the Campion Society. Santamaria attended the University of Melbourne, where he graduated in arts and law. He completed his Master of Arts degree with a thesis entitled Italy Changes Shirts: The Origins of Italian Fascism. Santamaria was a political activist from an early age who earned recognition as a leading Catholic student activist. During the Spanish Civil War, he was a strident supporter of the Nationalist side.

Santamaria was married in 1939 and had eight children. In 1980 his wife, Helen, died. He later married Dorothy Jensen, his long-time secretary. His younger brother, Joseph (Joseph Natalino Santamaria; also known as Joe), was a Melbourne surgeon and prominent in the Roman Catholic bioethics movement. His daughter Bernadette Tobin, is a leading Catholic bioethicist, and his late son Joseph Santamaria was an Australian jurist and a former judge of the Court of Appeal of the Supreme Court of Victoria.

== Catholic Worker movements ==
In 1936 he co-founded The Catholic Worker, a newspaper influenced by the social teaching of the Roman Catholic Church, particularly the encyclical Rerum novarum of Pope Leo XIII. He was the first editor of the paper which declared itself opposed to both communism and capitalism. Although the group campaigned for the rights of workers and against what it saw as the excesses of capitalism, Santamaria came to see the Communist Party of Australia, which in the 1940s made great advances in the Australian trade union movement, as the main enemy. In 1937 he was persuaded by Archbishop Daniel Mannix to join the National Secretariat of Catholic Action, a lay activist organisation.

During World War II, Santamaria gained an exemption from military service. In 1972 Arthur Calwell, a leading Catholic Labor politician, confirmed that Santamaria had "dodged" war service after Mannix had approached him to gain the exemption. When asked, Calwell stated "I want to put the record straight because apparently the Department of Defence cannot find any of the records, nor can the Department of Labour and National Service." Santamaria and two other men (Maher and K. W. Mitchell) were, argued Mannix, "members of the Secretariat of Catholic Action and that their work was equivalent to that of a minister of religion." Calwell said 'I regret my part in it... I want the country to know that these three men who have been pestering and opposing and demonstrating against the Australian Labor Party for the last 30 years were people who dodged military service'. He reflected on the Vietnam War and noted that all three supported it and "conscription of men for military service", adding "I regret that these people who benefited from our generosity did not beget any children who went out to fight in the war in Vietnam. Their sons were exempted, all of them, because they were employed in reserve institutions as were their fathers." Santamaria denied the allegation that he had ever sought an exemption. and stated that 'if Mr Calwell repeated his statement outside of parliament he would take appropriate action'. Calwell moderated his statements regarding Maher, but not on Mitchell or Santamaria. In May 1972, previously missing records were found confirming Calwell's version.

In 1941, Santamaria founded the Catholic Social Studies Movement, generally known simply as "the Movement" or Groupers, which recruited Catholic activists to oppose the spread of communism, particularly in the trade unions. The movement gained control of the Industrial Groups in the unions, fighting the communists and gaining control of many unions. This activity brought him into conflict not only with the Communist Party but with many left-wing Labor Party members, who favoured a united front with the communists during the war. During the 1930s and 1940s Santamaria generally supported the conservative Catholic wing of the Labor Party, but as the Cold War developed after 1945 his anti-communism drove him further away from Labor, particularly when H.V. Evatt became Leader of the Labor Party in 1951.

== Labor split and the National Civic Council ==
Events leading to "The Split" included a well publicised incident in the Parliament of Victoria. In October 1954, the Sydney Sun-Herald reported on a letter sent by the Victorian Minister for Lands, Robert W. Holt, to the federal secretary of the Australian Labor Party, a Mr J. Schmella, which the paper described as "probably as explosive, politically, as any document in Australia". Holt stated "My charge is that the Victorian branch is controlled and directed in the main by one group or section through Mr. B. Santamaria ... My criticism is not personal. It is leveled against those ideas which are contrary to what I believe Labor policy to be. Moreover, I have been requested by my numerous and trusted friends, who happen to be Catholic, to fight against the influence of Mr. Santamaria and those he represents, when he seeks to implement his ideas through an abuse of a political movement, designed to serve a truly political purpose."

Holt spoke of events the previous year and described attending a meeting of Santamaria's National Catholic Rural Movement Convention, following which he was, as Minister of Lands, approached by Santamaria and Frank Scully, where he was asked to use his position to make Crown land available to "Italians with foreign capital". When he refused, "Santamaria stated that I might not be in the next parliament", and Scully agreed. Holt considered this "a direct threat" which was confirmed when another M.L.A. confided that there was 'pressure' to oppose him for party selection for his seat. He added that "subsequent events which happened during the selection ballot' had convinced him that the ALP's "Victorian branch is not free to implement Labor policy and connives with this method". He concluded by stating his belief in:

a party machine which permits the true expression of opinion of its members, regardless of who or what they may be. The only requirement is loyalty to Labor ideals and principles. This is not possible in the present circumstances...

Holt introduced the Land Bill without Santamaria's desired advantage and it was at first amended by another ALP member, then defeated, amended again and passed – with what Santamaria wanted – after two Liberal party members "switched sides". In December 1954, Santamaria launched a suit against Holt for libel, citing the letter published in-full by the Sun-Herald. The libel action was withdrawn, without explanation, in April 1955.

In 1954 Evatt publicly blamed "the Groupers" for Labor's defeat in that year's federal election, and after a tumultuous National Conference in Hobart in 1955, Santamaria's parliamentary followers were expelled from the Labor Party. The resulting split (now usually called "The Split", although there have been several other "splits" in Labor history) brought down the Labor government of John Cain senior in Victoria. In Victoria, Mannix strongly supported Santamaria, but in New South Wales, Norman Cardinal Gilroy, the first Australian-born Roman Catholic prelate, opposed him, favouring the traditional alliance between the Church and Labor. Gilroy's influence in Rome helped to end official Church support for the Groupers. In January 1955, Santamaria used Mannix as his witness to the statement, "There is no Catholic organisation seeking to dominate the Labor Party or any other political party ... So that there will be no equivocation, Catholics are not associated with any other secular body seeking to dominate the Labor Party or any other political party."

Santamaria made this statement when he denied charges from the general secretary of the Australian Workers' Union (Mr T Dougherty) that the "No. 2-man in the Victorian ALP" (Frank McManus), the "No. 2-man in the NSW Labor Party" (J. Kane) and the "secretary of the Australian Rules Football Association of Queensland" (Mr Polgrain) were Santamaria's "top lieutenants in The Movement". For his part, McManus suggested that Dougherty "appeared to have contracted an ailment from one of his political colleagues ... the chief symptom of this ailment was that the sufferer believed he was always detecting conspiracy theories".

Santamaria founded a new organisation no longer an organ of Catholic Action, the National Civic Council (NCC), and edited its newspaper, News Weekly, for many years. His followers, known as Groupers, continued to control a number of important unions. Those expelled from the Labor Party formed a new party, the Democratic Labor Party (DLP), dedicated to opposing both Communism and the Labor Party, which they said was controlled by Communist sympathisers. Santamaria never joined the DLP but was one of its guiding influences.

== Anti-communist and social conservative ==
During the 1960s and 1970s, Santamaria regularly warned of the dangers of communism in Southeast Asia, and supported South Vietnam and the United States in the Vietnam War. He founded the Australian Family Association and the Thomas More Centre (for Traditional Catholicism) to extend the work of the NCC. However, his political role gradually declined. The death of the 99-year-old Archbishop Mannix (in 1963) ended the Roman Catholic Church's support for the NCC, even in Victoria. In 1974 the DLP lost all its seats in the Senate, and was wound up a few years later. Santamaria ran the NCC in a highly personal and (according to his critics) autocratic way, and in 1982 there was a serious split in the organisation, with most of the trade unionists leaving it.

The first of four unions disaffiliated after the split of 1955, attempted to return at the ALP Victorian State Conference in 1983. The Federated Clerks' Union and three others similarly aligned 'right-wing' unions – the Shop, Distributive and Allied Employees Association, the Federated Ironworkers' Association of Australia and the Amalgamated Society of Carpenters and Joiners – had their re-affiliation cases considered by a special Victorian ALP committee of ten which split on the decision 5 against 5 and had submitted separate reports to the State Conference. The Federated Clerks' case, 'after a bitter and at times acrimonious 3 and a 1/2-hour debate', which was 'centred on alleged links' with Santamaria, the National Civic Council, and the Industrial Action Fund, was defeated at the State Conference by 289 votes to 189. It was noted in a news report of the time that all four were likely to appeal to the federal ALP executive and that they had the support of then Prime Minister Bob Hawke. The ALP federal executive supported the re-affiliation before the 1985 Victorian State Conference while two of the unions were refused re-affiliation in the Northern Territory later that year. Ultimately, all four returned as ALP affiliated unions in some form; the Federated Clerks' Union amalgamated into the affiliated Australian Services Union in 1993, the Shop, Distributive and Allied Employees Association is a current ALP affiliated union, while the Federated Ironworkers' Association of Australia and the Amalgamated Society of Carpenters and Joiners amalgamated with the affiliated Australian Workers' Union.

But Santamaria's personal stature continued to grow, through his regular column in The Australian newspaper and his regular television spot, Point of View (he was given free air time by Frank Packer, owner of the Nine Network). He was one of the most articulate voices of Australian conservatism for more than 20 years.

According to historians David McKnight and C. J. Coventry, Santamaria worked for the United States of America as an informer in the 1960s and 1970s discreetly providing information about Australia to diplomatic officials.

He was offered a knighthood by Malcolm Fraser but declined it.

== Traditionalism in the Catholic Church ==
Santamaria also opposed what he saw as liberal and non-traditional trends in the Catholic Church following the Second Vatican Council (which he had sought to attend as an independent observer), and founded a magazine through his Thomas More Centre, called AD 2000, to argue for traditionalist views. He welcomed Pope John Paul II's return to conservatism in many areas.

The conservative Archbishop of Melbourne, George Pell, a staunch supporter of Santamaria, delivered the panegyric at his funeral, which was held at St. Patrick's Cathedral, Melbourne. Santamaria had died from an inoperable brain tumour at age 82 at Caritas Christi Hospice, Kew, Victoria. On his death Santamaria was praised by conservatives for his opposition to communism, but also by some on the left (such as veteran left-wing Labor ex-Cabinet Minister Clyde Cameron) and by social democrats (such as former Governor-General Bill Hayden) for his consistent critique of unrestricted capitalism.

== Bibliography ==
=== Books ===
- The Price of Freedom : the Movement – after ten years (1964) Campion Press
- Point of View (1969) Hawthorn Press
- The defence of Australia (1970) Hawthorn Press
- Against the Tide (1981) Oxford University Press
- Daniel Mannix : the quality of leadership (1984) Melbourne University Press
- Australia at the crossroads : reflections of an outsider (1987) Melbourne University Press
- Santamaria : a Memoir (1997) Oxford University Press (Revised ed. of Against the tide)
- Your Most Obedient Servant : selected letters, 1938–1996 (edited by Patrick Morgan) (2007) Miegunyah Press (in association with the State Library of Victoria)
- Running the Show : selected documents, 1939–1996 (edited by Patrick Morgan) (2008) Miegunyah Press (in association with the State Library of Victoria)

=== Pamphlets ===
- What the church has done for the worker (1940) Renown Press
- The fight for the land : the program and objectives of the National Catholic Rural Movement (1942) * Advocate Press
- Self-government and the land : War Agricultural Committee Organisation (1943) NCRM
- The earth - our mother (A study of the future of Australian agriculture) (1945) Araluen Publishing
- Correspondence with Professor N. W. Arndt (1956)
- The pattern of a Christian society (1956) Renown Press
- Catholics and the fight against communism in Australia (1956) NCRM
- Religious apostolate and political action (1956)
- The mission of the layman : an analysis of the thought of Pius XII on the mission of the layman in the modern world (1957) Australian Catholic Publications
- Peace or war? : The global strategy of world communism (1958) Renown Press
- New Guinea : the price of weakness (1959) Australian Catholic Publications
- The peace game (1959) National Civic Council
- Spotlight on Santamaria : a commentary on the present and future of Australia (1960) Hawthorn
- Equality in education (1960) Institute of Social Order
- Communism returns to Yallourn (1960) Renown Press
- The Movement 1941-60 : an outline (1961) Hawthorn Press
- State aid in perspective (1966) Hawthorn Press
- Determined to survive (1966) Hawthorn Press
- The politics of 1966 (1966) Hawthorn Press
- Contraception : reflections on the Pope's ruling (1968)
- The Australian Labor movement (1966–71) : the issue of control (1971) Hawthorn Press
- Philosophies in collision (1973) National Civic Council
- Archbishop Mannix : his contribution to the art of public leadership in Australia (1978) Melbourne University Press
- A.N.Z.U.S. in the "eighties" (1979) Australia Defence Association
- The movement into the eighties : a study paper (1981) National Civic Council
- The challenge of the eighties : a study paper (1981) National Civic Council Extension Committee
- Test tube babies? (1984) Australian Family Association
- The church in Australia : the visit of John Paul II in perspective (1986) National Civic Council
- Presentation of discussion papers to the Society by Bob Santamaria and Clyde Cameron, Elder Hall Adelaide University, 26 October 1997 (2000) Society for the Study of Labour History

=== Articles ===
- Santamaria, B. A. (July–August 1995). "Frank Knopfelmacher". Quadrant. 39 (7–8): 31–33.

=== Critical studies, reviews and biographies of Santamaria ===
- Ross Fitzgerald: The Pope's Battalions: Santamaria, Catholicism and the Labor Split: St. Lucia, University of Queensland Press: 2003; ISBN 0-7022-3389-7
- Gerard Henderson: Mr Santamaria and the Bishops: Sydney: Hale and Iremonger: 1983; ISBN 0-86806-059-3
- Xavier Connor, et al.: Santamaria: The Politics of Fear: Richmond: Spectrum: 2000; ISBN 0-86786-294-7
- Joseph N. Santamaria: The Education of Dr Joe: Ballan: Connor Court Publishing: 2006; ISBN 0-9758015-3-8
- Gerard Henderson: Santamaria: A Most Unusual Man: Melbourne: Miegunyah: 2015; ISBN 9780522868586
