= Evdokia Petrova =

Russian spy in Australia in the 1950s

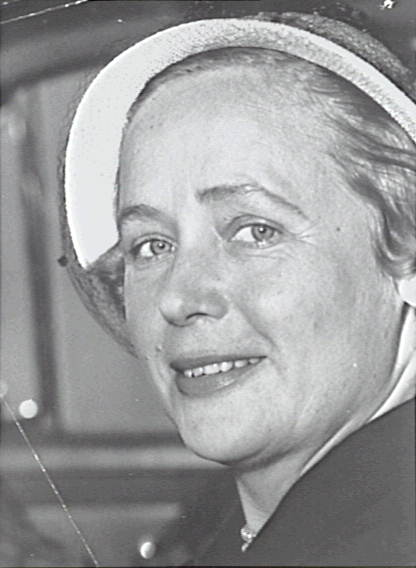
Evdokia Petrova in 1954

Evdokia Alexeyevna Petrova (Russian: Евдоки́я Алексе́евна Петро́ва; September 15, 1914 – July 19, 2002) was a Soviet spy in Australia in the 1950s. She was the wife of Vladimir Petrov, and came to prominence with him during the Petrov Affair.

== Life ==
Raised in the Soviet Union, Petrova worked as a bureaucrat in the state-run forced labor camps or gulags. In 1951, she was posted with her husband as a diplomat to Australia, though her real work was as a spy, in the rank of captain, against the Australian government. In this capacity she provided clerical, cypher, and operational assistance to the Soviet embassy in Canberra.

With her husband she defected to Australia in 1954. This happened at Darwin Airport, at the height of the Petrov Affair. The Petrovs' memoirs of the episode were contained in their book Empire of Fear, which was ghost-written by Michael Thwaites.

After the defection, Evdokia was haunted by worries about her family in Moscow, fearing they had been punished or killed. The Red Cross reconnected her to her family in 1960. Her father had been sacked from his job following the defection, and died three years later, but she stayed in contact with her mother until her mother's death in 1965. Her sister Tamara migrated to Australia in 1990.

The Petrovs bought a home in Bentleigh, Melbourne, in 1956.

To help protect their identities in Australia, the Petrovs took the names Sven and Anna Allyson. They were protected under the D-notice system. Although the press agreed not to identify them under the D-notice, the press did not always observe this voluntary protection order. Evdokia became an Australian citizen in 1956. She found work as a typist for William Adams Tractors under the name Anna Allyson. Vladimir Petrov died in 1991, but she was not able to attend his funeral due to media attention. Robert Manne interviewed her in 1996; the interview is held by the National Library of Australia. She died in 2002, aged 87.

== Fictional works ==
Evdokia Petrov's life has inspired a number of fictional works.

- The Red Shoe, a novel by Ursula Dubosarsky which won the New South Wales Premier's Literary Award and the Queensland Premier's Literary Award in 2006.
- Mrs Petrov's Shoe, a play by Noelle Janaczewska which won the Queensland Premier's Literary Award for drama in 2006.
- The Safe House, an animation by Lee Whitmore, narrated by Noni Hazelhurst, which won Best Animation at the Sydney Film Festival 2006.
- Document Z, a novel by Andrew Croome, which won the Australian/Vogel Literary Award in 2008.
- The Petrov Affair, a 1987 television mini-series.

== See also ==
- List of Eastern Bloc defectors
