= Vladimir Petrov (diplomat) =

Soviet intelligence officer (1907–1991)

- Владимир Миха́йлович Петров
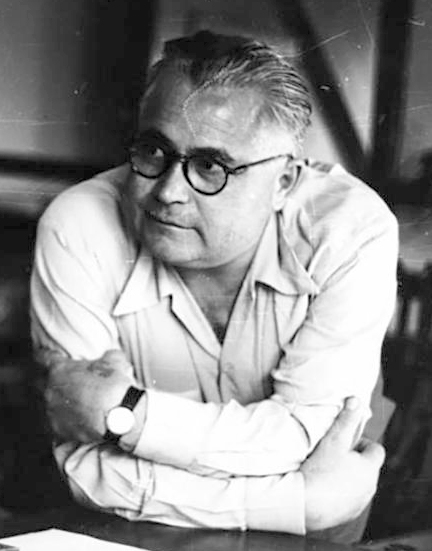
- Vladimir Petrov in a safe house after defecting to Australia.
- Born: Afanasii Mikhailovich Shorokhov; 15 February 1907; Larikha, Siberia, Russian Empire
- Died: 14 June 1991 (aged 84); Parkville, Victoria, Australia
- Other name: Vladimir Mikhaylovich Proletarsky
- Citizenship: Soviet
- Occupation: Intelligence officer
- Spouse: Evdokia Kartseva (m. 1940)

Vladimir Mikhaylovich Petrov (Russian: Влади́мир Миха́йлович Петро́в; born Afanasii Mikhailovich Shorokhov; 15 February 1907 – 14 June 1991) was a Soviet spy who defected to Australia, the country he was deployed in, in 1954 with his wife Evdokia, in what became known as the Petrov Affair.

== Early life and career ==
Petrov was born Afanasii Mikhailovich Shorokhov (Russian: Афанасий Миха́йлович Шорохов) on 15 February 1907 in Larikha, Russia, in what is now Tyumen Oblast in central Siberia.

Petrov was one of three brothers born to a peasant family. His father died when he was seven years old and he started work at a young age to support his family. He had only three years of formal education and was apprenticed to a blacksmith at the age of fourteen.

In 1923, Petrov established a local Komsomol cell. He subsequently joined the Soviet Navy's cryptographical section where he was a specialist in ciphers. He changed his full name to Vladimir Mikhaylovich Proletarsky (Russian: Влади́мир Миха́йлович Пролетарский) in 1929, naming himself after the proletariat.

== Intelligence career ==
Petrov joined the Soviet spy organization, then called the OGPU, in May 1933, while serving in the Navy. He was subsequently admitted to the Special Cipher Section, which was attached to the Foreign Department of the OGPU.

A memoir credited to Vladimir and Evdokia Petrov, Empire of Fear, was ghost-written by an ASIO intelligence officer, Michael Thwaites, serialised in newspapers in 1955, and published in book-form in 1956. The memoir makes clear that Petrov's status in the cipher section allowed him to learn many Soviet secrets by reading the top secret documents enciphered. It gives the following details about his career between 1930 and 1954:

- 1930–1933 cypher clerk Soviet Navy.
- 1933–1937 NKVD Moscow dealing with overseas cypher communications.
- 1937 NKVD cypher clerk attached to Soviet Army Western China.
- 1940–1942 NKVD cypher clerk Moscow dealing with Internal communications.
- 1942–1947 NKVD cypher clerk Sweden with additional Internal Security duties.
- 1947–1951 MGB Moscow handling cases of Soviet seamen accused of offences while visiting foreign ports.
- 1951–1954 MGB controller in Australia. Having graduated from cipher clerk to full-fledged agent, Petrov was sent to Australia in 1951. His job there was to recruit spies and to keep watch on Soviet citizens, making sure that none of the Soviets abroad defected.

Petrov lived through the purges of Stalin under Yagoda, Yezhov, and Beria. A great number of his friends, colleagues, and superiors were arrested and executed, but Petrov escaped unscathed.

== Defection ==
Petrov's defection came about through his association with Polish-born doctor and musician Michael Bialoguski, who played along in seeming to allow Petrov to recruit him to gather information, while at the same time reporting to Australian Security Intelligence Organisation on Petrov's activities.

Petrov applied for political asylum in 1954, on the grounds that he could provide information regarding a Soviet spy ring operating out of the Soviet Embassy in Australia. Petrov stated in his memoirs that his reason for defecting was not fear of imminent execution, but his disillusionment with the Soviet system and his own experiences and knowledge of the terror and human suffering inflicted on the Soviet people by their government, in particular during the forced collectivization of farms and the ensuing famine.

== Later life ==
Petrov and his wife were granted Australian citizenship on 12 October 1956. The government imposed a D-Notice, barring reporting of their activities, and established them in a safe house in Bentleigh East over fears that the Soviet government would attempt to assassinate them. He and his wife adopted the pseudonyms Sven and Anna Allyson. Although the press agreed not to identify them under the D-notice, this voluntary protection order was not always observed. The whereabouts of the Petrovs were still subject to a D-Notice in 1982.

In 1957, under his assumed identity, Petrov began working for Ilford Photo in Upwey, while his wife worked as a typist for a tractor company. They purchased a house in Bentleigh, living a quiet suburban life. Petrov "enjoyed Australian rules football and rabbit shooting" while his wife did voluntary work for Meals on Wheels.

Petrov suffered a series of strokes in 1974 and was hospitalised at the Mount Royal Geriatric Hospital in Parkville (now part of Royal Melbourne Hospital). He remained hospitalised until his death from pneumonia on 14 June 1991, aged 84. A private funeral was held, "attended only by his wife, a few friends, and ASIO officers" including former director-general Charles Spry.

== Fictional representations ==
Petrov's defection has inspired fictional works.

- The Case of Colonel Petrov (1956) for American television
- Defection! The Case of Colonel Petrov (1966) for British television
- The Red Shoe, a novel by Ursula Dubosarsky which won the New South Wales Premier's Literary Award and the Queensland Premier's Literary Award in 2006.
- Mrs Petrov's Shoe, a play by Noelle Janaczewska which won the Queensland Premier's Literary Award for drama in 2006.
- The Safe House, an animation by Lee Whitmore, narrated by Noni Hazelhurst, which won Best Animation at the Sydney Film Festival 2006.
- Document Z, a novel by Andrew Croome, which won the Australian/Vogel Literary Award in 2008.
- The Petrov Affair, a 1987 television mini-series.

== See also ==
- Australian Labor Party split of 1955
- List of Eastern Bloc defectors
