= Andrew Robertson (doctor) =

Australian public health doctor

Andrew Geoffrey Robertson CSC PSM

Chief Health Officer
- In office June 2018 – February 2026
- Preceded by: Tarun Weeramanthri
- Succeeded by: Clare Huppatz

Personal details
- Education: University of Sydney, Curtin University
- Awards: Conspicuous Service Cross, Public Service Medal

Andrew Geoffrey Robertson CSC PSM is an Australian public health doctor. He was Chief Health Officer of Western Australia from 2019 to 2026.

== Career ==
Robertson served for the Royal Australian Navy from 1984 to 2003. During this time, he took part in three tours to Iraq as a Biological Weapons Chief Inspector for the United Nations Special Commission. Since then, he has been in the Navy's reserves, taking on the position of Director General Navy Health Reserves between July 2015 and December 2019.

He first joined the Western Australia Department of Health in October 2003, where he was in the position of Director, Disaster Preparedness and Management. In this role, he led an Australian medical team in the Maldives after the 2004 Indian Ocean Tsunami, managed WA's response to the 2005 Bali bombings, led a WA Health team into Indonesia after the 2006 Yogyakarta earthquake and worked as a radiation health adviser to the Australian Embassy after the Fukushima nuclear disaster.

Robertson was Deputy Chief Health Officer for Western Australia from 2008 to May 2018. In June 2018, he was appointed Acting Chief Health Officer, after Tarun Weeramanthri went on leave. Weeramanthri formally resigned on 20 October 2018, and Robertson continued as acting Chief Health Officer until February 2019, when he was promoted to Chief Health Officer, alongside gaining the position of assistant director general of public and aboriginal health.

Robertson was a prominent person in Western Australia's COVID-19 response, doing daily press conferences alongside Health Minister Roger Cook and Premier Mark McGowan.

In November 2025, it was announced that Robertson would retire in February 2026. He was replaced by deputy chief health officer Clare Huppatz.

== Awards and honours ==
- Conspicuous Service Cross, 1999, "for outstanding achievement in the field of Nuclear, Biological and Chemical Defence while serving with the Office of the Surgeon General."
- Public Service Medal in the 2013 Australia Day Honours, "for outstanding public service as Director, Disaster Management and Preparedness within WA Health."

Government offices
Preceded by Tarun Weeramanthri	Chief Health Officer; 2018–2026	Succeeded by Clare Huppatz
