= Tarun Weeramanthri =

Chief Health Officer (Victoria)
- In office 2 January 2025 – 30 April 2025
- Preceded by: Dr Clare Looker

Chief Health Officer (Western Australia)
- In office 2008–2018
- Succeeded by: Andrew Robertson

Chief Health Officer (Northern Territory)
- In office 2004–2007
- Preceded by: Shirley Hendy
- Succeeded by: Barbara Paterson

Personal details
- Education: University of Sydney, University of Western Australia
- Awards: Sidney Sax Medal, Minister for Health's Award

Tarun Weeramanthri is a specialist physician, dual certified in internal medicine and public health, who is an adjunct professor at the University of Western Australia (UWA). He has worked at national, regional and international level, moving between administration, policy and frontline work, and is the only person to have been appointed Chief Health Officer in three Australian jurisdictions. Firstly in the Northern Territory from 2004 to 2007, then Western Australia from 2008 to 2018, and most recently Victoria from January to April 2025. Since 2022, he has represented the West Pacific on the Governing Council of the World Federation of Public Health Associations.

== Career ==
Weeramanthri has a Ph.D. in social medicine from the University of Sydney.

Weeramanthri was Chief Health Officer of the Northern Territory between 2004 and 2007, succeeding Shirley Hendy, and succeeded by Barbara Paterson.

Weeramanthri began as Chief Health Officer of Western Australia in 2008. Achievements in public health in Western Australia under his leadership include the Public Health Act 2016, replacing the Health Act 1911, and the opening of Perth Children's Hospital after lead and asbestos issues. During his time in Western Australia, he was also Assistant Director General of the Department of Health. In May 2018, he went on leave, formally resigning on 20 October 2018. He was succeeded by Andrew Robertson.

Weeramanthri worked with the World Health Organization in Sierra Leone in 2015 as Emergency Medical Teams coordinator for the Ebola response, and in Iraq in 2017 as the trauma coordinator around the conflict in Mosul. He has also worked in disaster and emergency response for the Australian government in both India (2008, 2021) and Papua New Guinea (2018).

Weeramanthri is an adjunct professor for the UWA School of Population and Global Health, chair of Rare Voices Australia, deputy chair of the Pathwest board and a board member of the Australian Institute of Health and Welfare.

During Victoria's second wave of COVID-19 in mid-2020, Weeramanthri assisted with the state's public health response. He was also a special advisor to the Western Australian government for its COVID-19 response during 2020.

In October 2020, Weeramanthri was appointed president of the Public Health Association of Australia.

In February 2021, Weeramanthri was appointed by the Western Australian government to conduct a review into the procedures and processes of the state's hotel quarantine program, after a security guard working at a quarantine hotel caught COVID-19 from a guest, causing parts of Western Australia to go into a 5-day lockdown.

In 2025, Weeramanthri was appointed by the Victorian government as Chief Health Officer for a four-month term while the Victorian Department of Health conducted recruitment for a permanent Chief Health Officer.

== Awards and honours ==
- Public Health Association of Australia's President's Award (2013)
- Sidney Sax Medal for contribution to public health in Australia (2014)
- Western Australia Minister for Health's award for Outstanding Commitment to a Healthier Western Australia (2018)
- Member of the Order of Australia for service to public health administration (2022)

Government offices
Preceded by Shirley Hendy	Chief Health Officer (Northern Territory); 2004–2007	Succeeded by Barbara Paterson
Preceded by	Chief Health Officer (Western Australia); 2008–2018	Succeeded by Andrew Robertson
