= List of diplomatic missions of Australia =

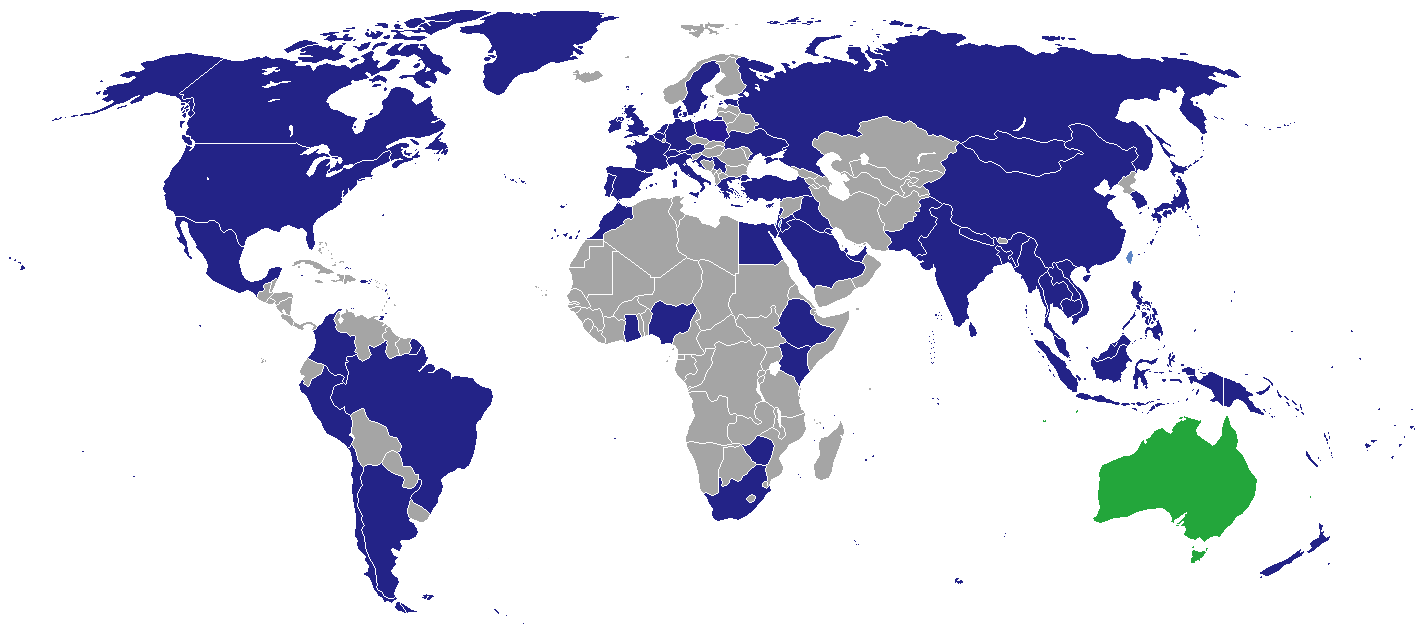
Diplomatic missions of Australia

The Commonwealth of Australia possesses an extensive network of diplomatic and consular missions. They are mostly maintained by the Department of Foreign Affairs and Trade, with some smaller consular posts being run by Austrade. There are currently over 100 Australian missions overseas.

As Australia is a member of the Commonwealth of Nations, its diplomatic missions in the capitals of other Commonwealth countries are referred to as High Commissions (as opposed to embassies). Australia's diplomatic missions have a key focus on Commonwealth, Asian, and Pacific Islander countries.

Under the terms of the Canada–Australia Consular Services Sharing Agreement, the two countries provide consular services to each other's citizens at a number of locations around the world. At this time, there are 12 cities where Canadians can obtain consular services from Australian offices, and 19 locations where Canadian offices provide consular services to Australians. In an emergency, Australians can also seek assistance from British diplomatic missions around the world in the absence of an Australian consulate or embassy.

Honorary consulates are excluded from this listing.

== History ==
After federation in 1901, Australia's presence abroad was largely limited to state and Commonwealth agents and trade offices. The United Kingdom played a defining role in Australia's foreign policy, limiting its need for missions abroad. In 1939 there were only two External Affairs officers posted overseas: one in London (known as Australia House), and one in Washington attached to the British Embassy.

The Second World War necessitated increased co-operation with foreign countries independent of the UK's Foreign Office. By 1940, a base of four missions had been established in Washington, Ottawa, London, and Tokyo, and as World War II progressed missions to Australia's wartime allies were established in Nouméa, Chongqing, and Moscow.

Australian diplomatic missions today number at over 100, although the number of Australian diplomats overseas has dramatically been reduced. Missions have been closed in Almaty, Damascus, Kupang, Lusaka, Algiers, Cape Town, Dar es Salaam, and Bridgetown.

== Current missions ==
=== Africa ===
Host country	Host city	Mission	Year opened	Concurrent accreditation	Ref.
Egypt	Cairo	Embassy	1950	Countries: Eritrea; Sudan	
Ethiopia	Addis Ababa	Embassy	2014	Countries: Central African Republic; Djibouti; South Sudan; International Organizations: African Union (Note: Accredited as an observer mission.); Intergovernmental Authority on Development; United Nations Economic Commission for Africa	
Ghana	Accra	High Commission	1957	Countries: Burkina Faso; Guinea; Ivory Coast; Liberia; Mali; Senegal; Sierra Leone; Togo	
Kenya	Nairobi	High Commission	1976	Countries: Burundi; Rwanda; Somalia; Tanzania; Uganda; International Organizations: United Nations; United Nations Environment Programme; United Nations Human Settlements Programme	
Mauritius	Port Louis	High Commission	1984	Countries: Comoros; Madagascar; Seychelles	
Morocco	Rabat	Embassy	2017		
Nigeria	Abuja	High Commission	1960	Countries: Benin; Cameroon; Gabon; Gambia; Niger; International Organizations: Economic Community of West African States	
South Africa	Pretoria	High Commission	1946	Countries: Angola; Botswana; Eswatini; Lesotho; Mozambique; Namibia; International Organizations: Southern African Development Community	
Zimbabwe	Harare	Embassy	1980	Countries: Congo-Brazzaville; Congo-Kinshasa; Malawi; Zambia	

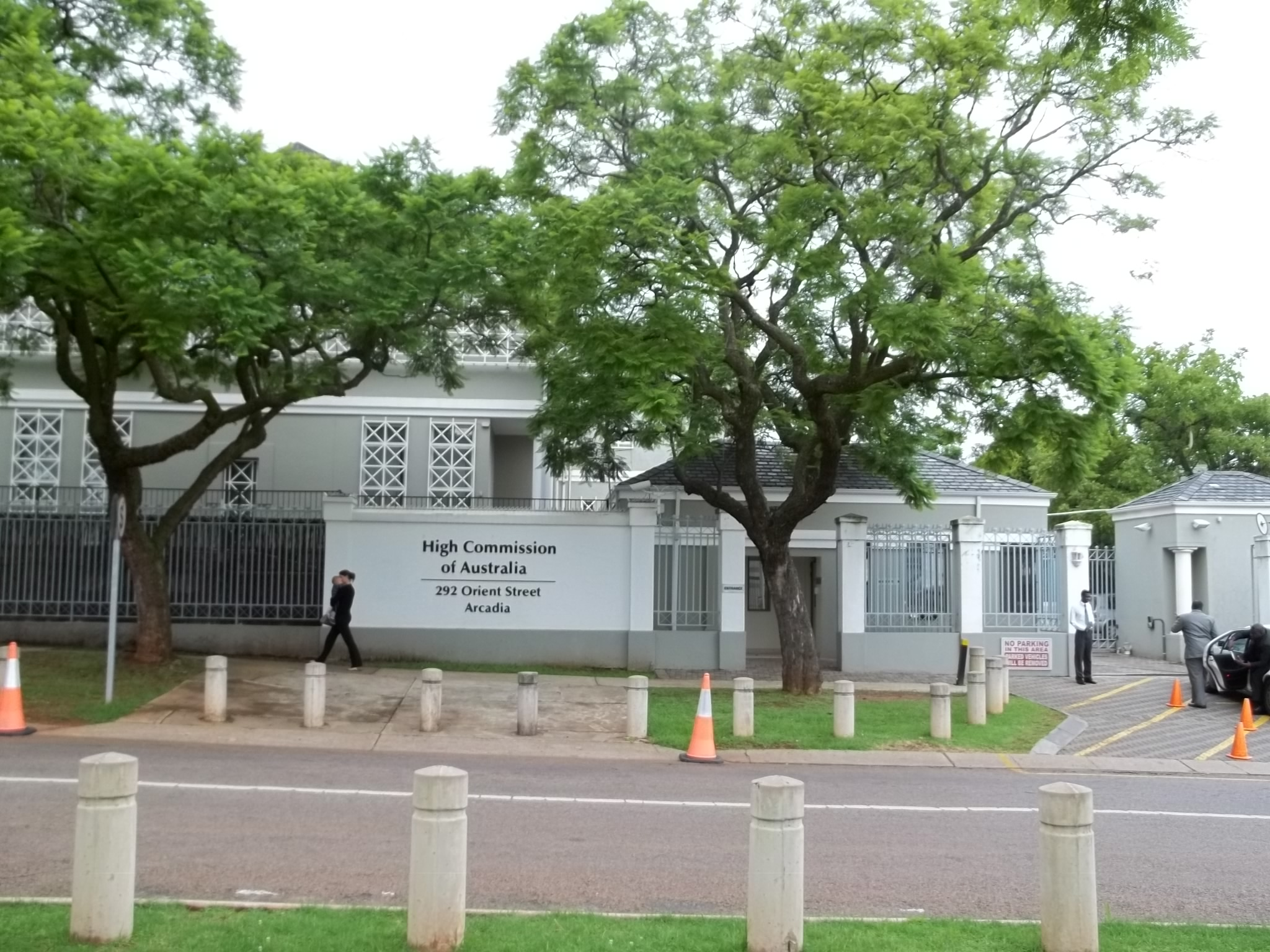
High Commission in Pretoria

=== Americas ===
Host country	Host city	Mission	Year opened	Concurrent accreditation	Ref.
Argentina	Buenos Aires	Embassy	1959	Countries: Paraguay; Uruguay	
Brazil	Brasília	Embassy	1946		
Brazil	São Paulo	Consulate-General			
Canada	Ottawa	High Commission	1939		
Canada	Toronto	Consulate-General	1975		
Canada	Vancouver	Consulate	1975		
Chile	Santiago de Chile	Embassy	1946	Countries: Ecuador	
Colombia	Bogotá	Embassy	2017	Countries: Venezuela	
Mexico	Mexico City	Embassy	1967	Countries: Costa Rica; Cuba; Dominican Republic; El Salvador; Guatemala; Honduras; Nicaragua; Panama	
Peru	Lima	Embassy	1968	Countries: Bolivia	
Trinidad and Tobago	Port of Spain	High Commission	2004	Countries: Antigua and Barbuda; Bahamas; Barbados; Belize; Dominica; Grenada; Guyana; Haiti; Jamaica; Saint Kitts and Nevis; Saint Lucia; Saint Vincent and the Grenadines; Suriname; International Organizations: Caribbean Community	
United States	Washington, D.C.	Embassy	1918	International Organizations: Organization of American States	
United States	Chicago	Consulate-General	1971	International Organizations: Organization of American States	
United States	Honolulu	Consulate-General	1973	International Organizations: Organization of American States	
United States	Houston	Consulate-General	1982	International Organizations: Organization of American States	
United States	Los Angeles	Consulate-General	1971	International Organizations: Organization of American States	
United States	New York City	Consulate-General	1945	International Organizations: Organization of American States	
United States	San Francisco	Consulate-General	1946	International Organizations: Organization of American States	

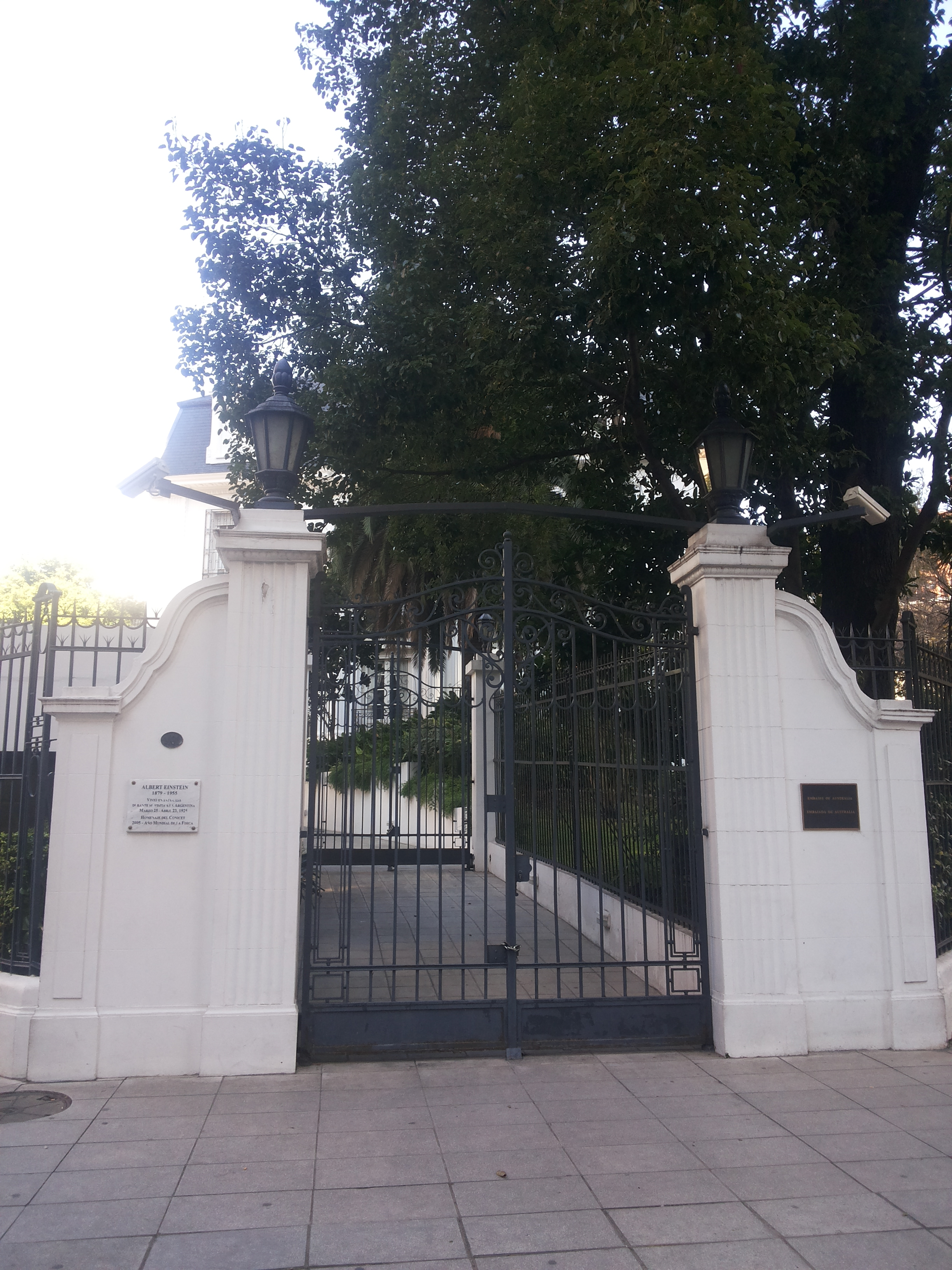
Embassy in Buenos Aires

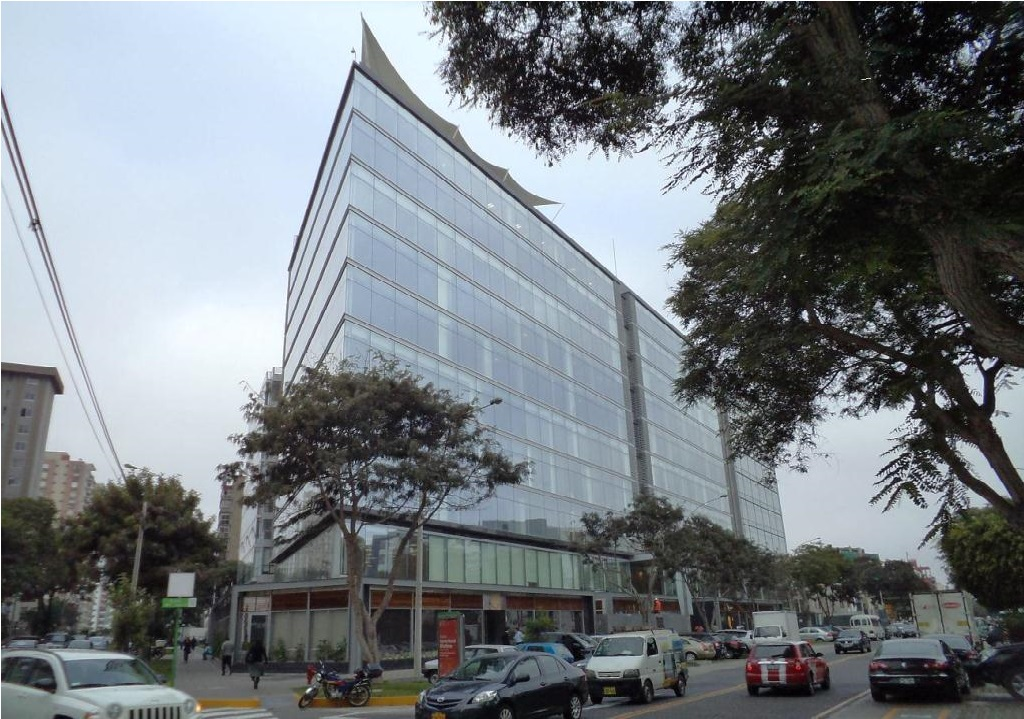
Building hosting the Embassy in Lima

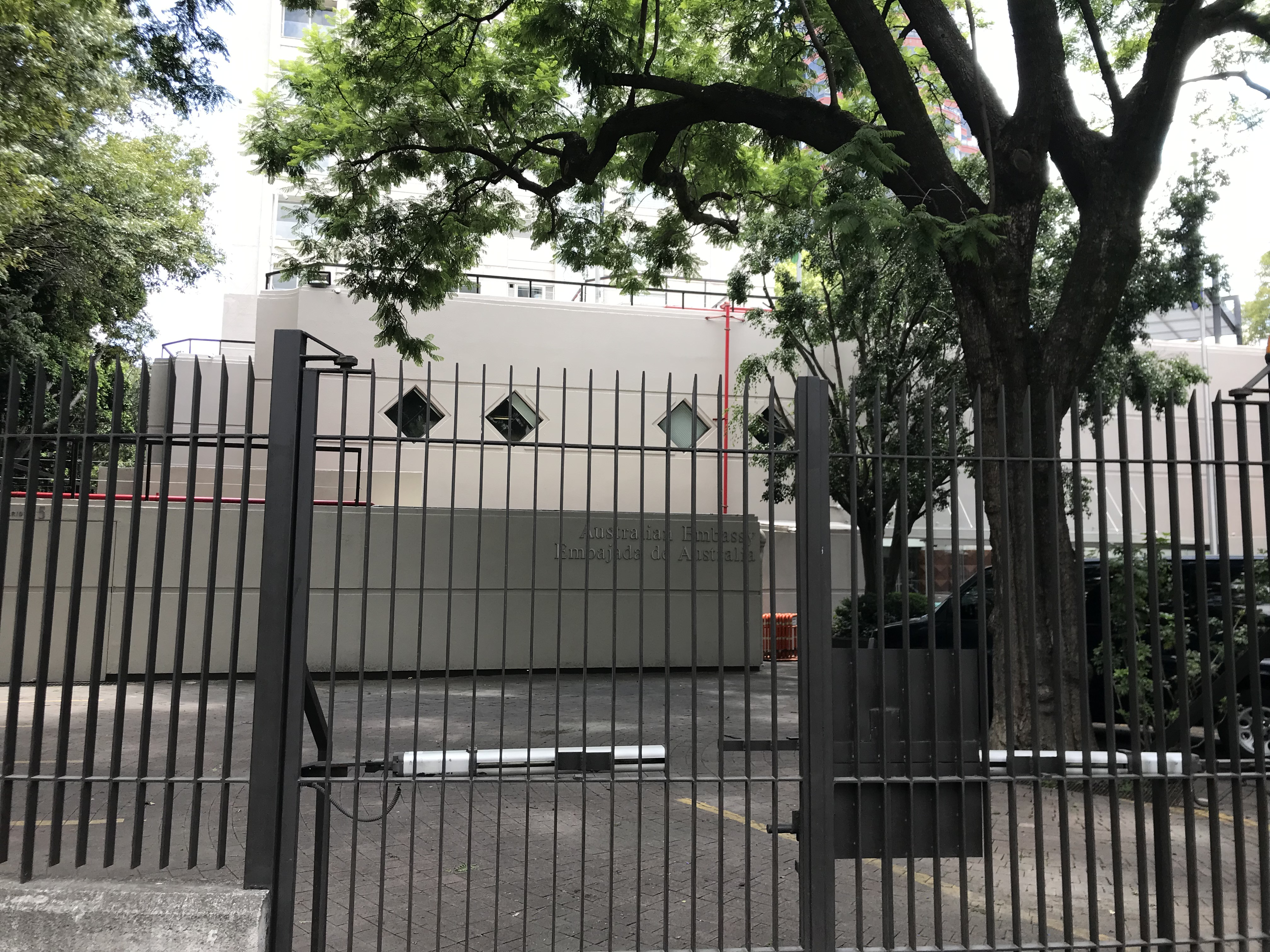
Embassy in Mexico City

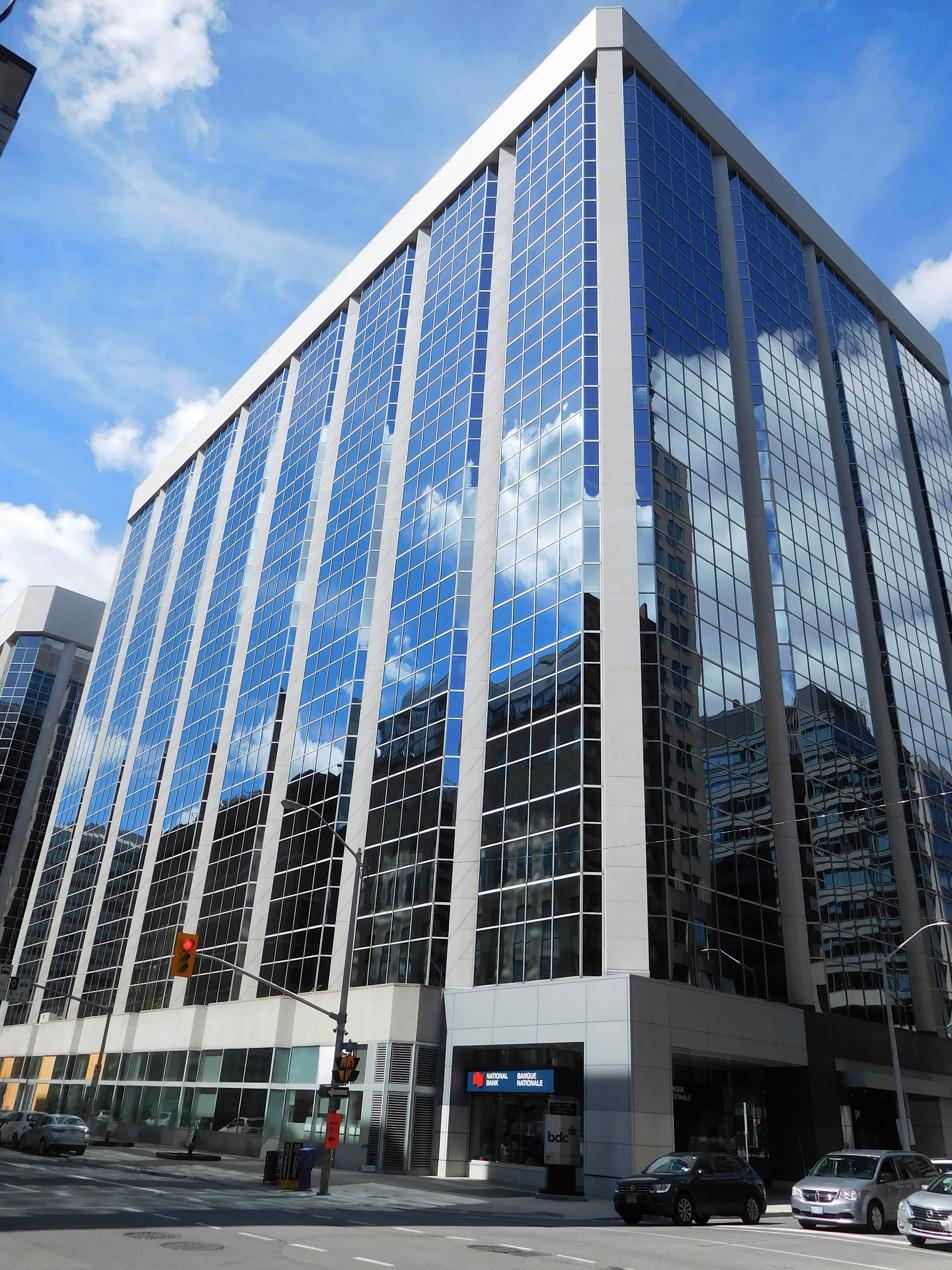
Building hosting the High Commission in Ottawa

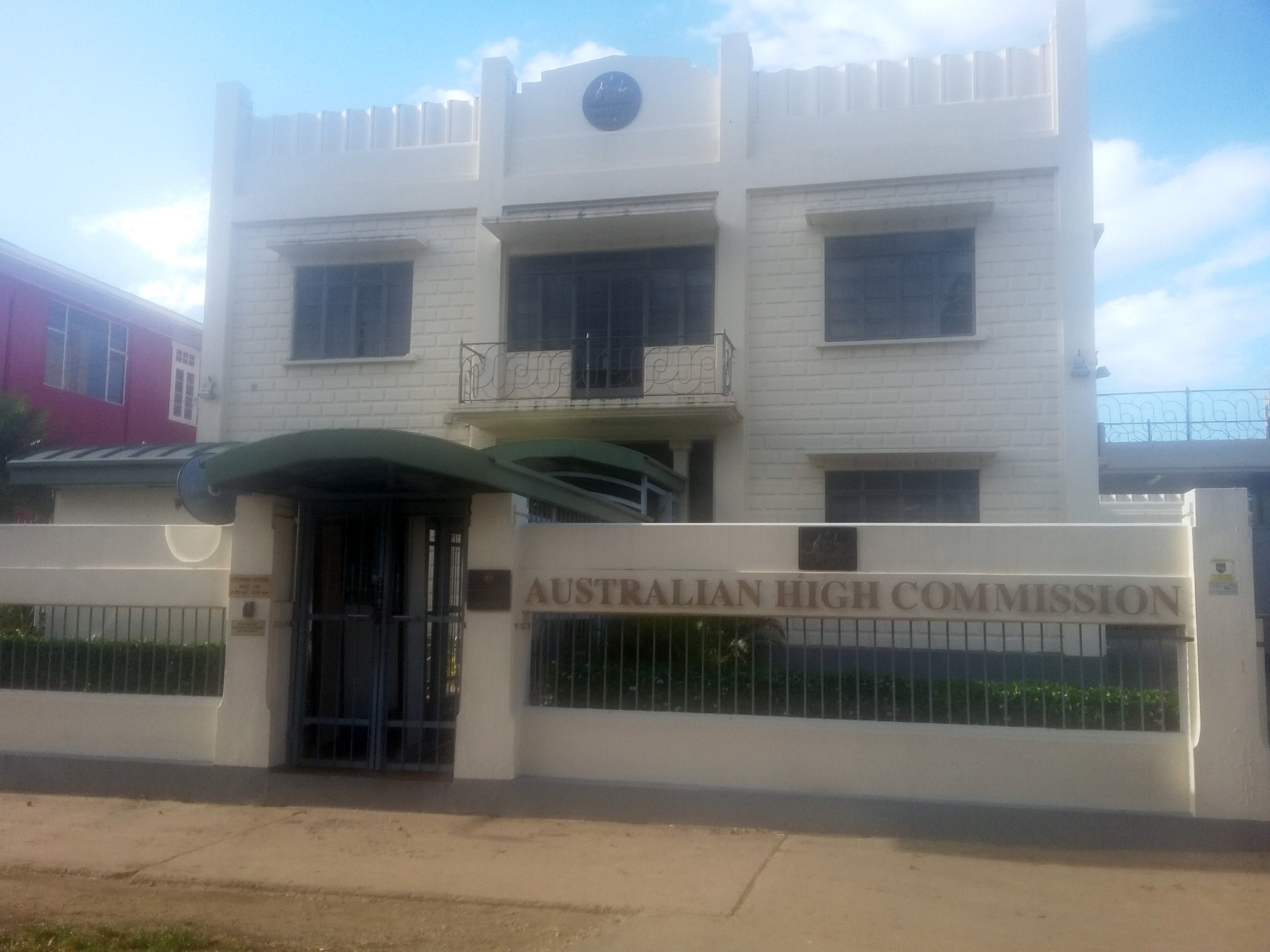
High Commission in Port of Spain

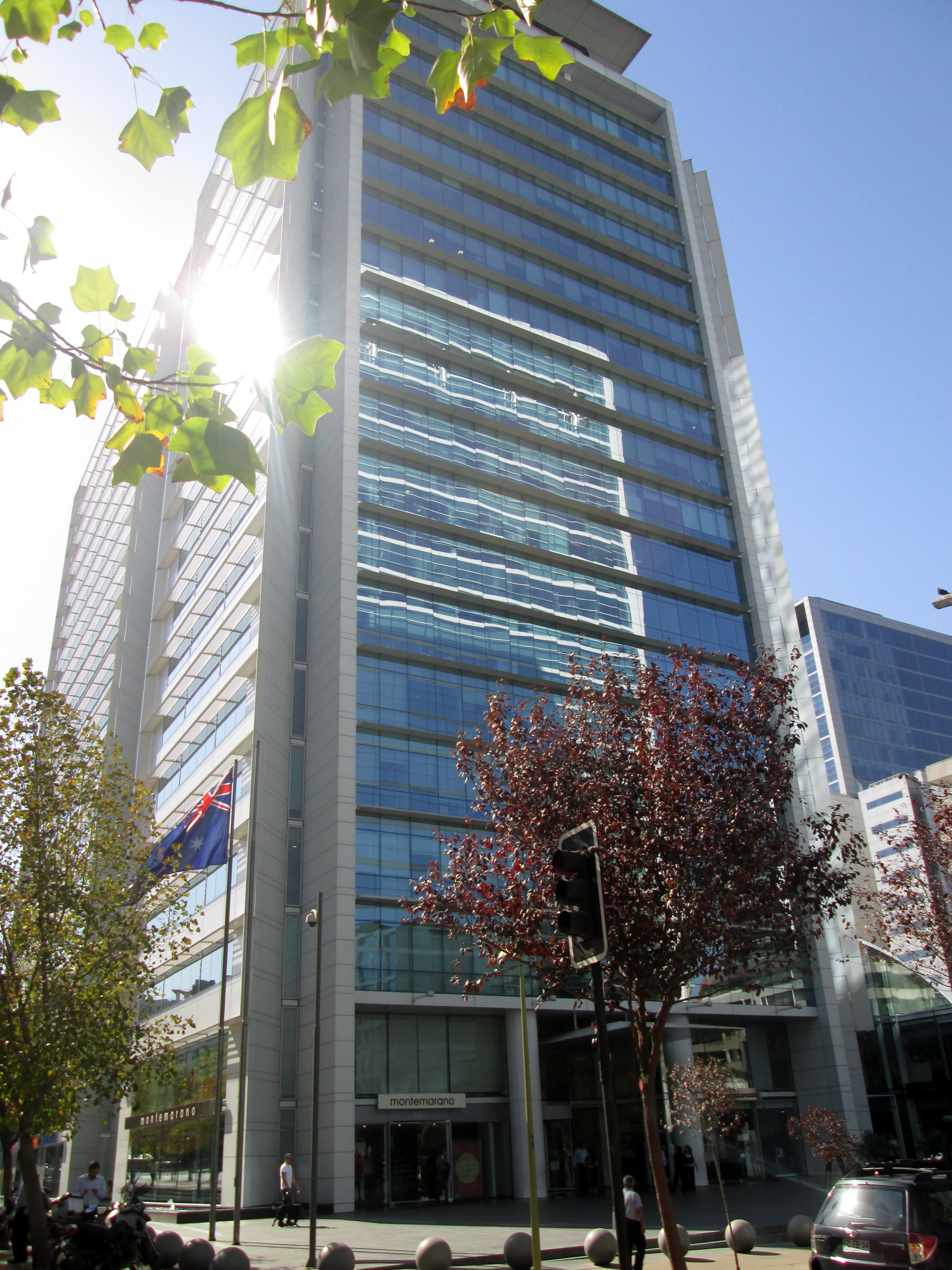
Building hosting the Embassy in Santiago

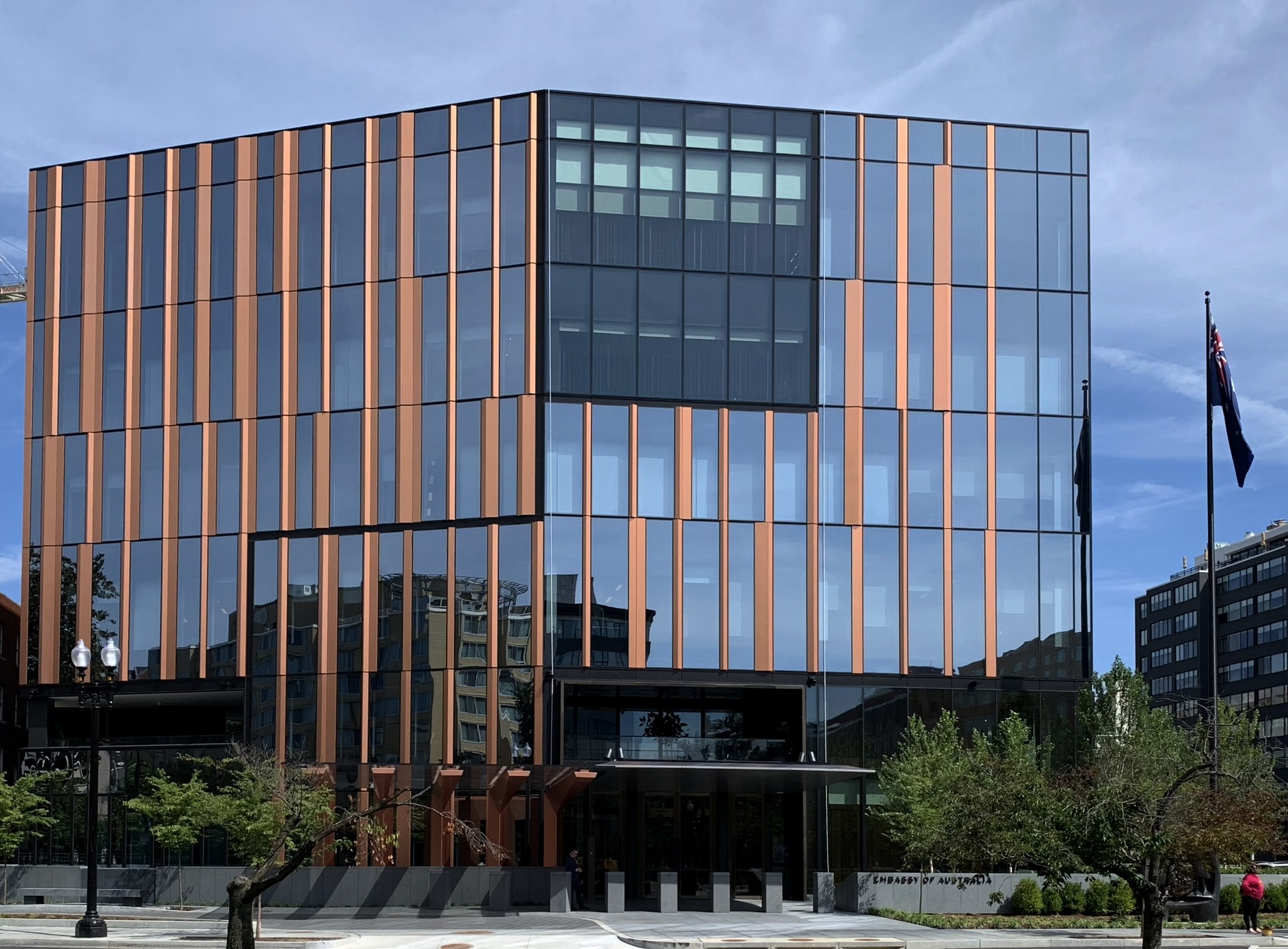
Embassy of Australia, Washington, D.C.

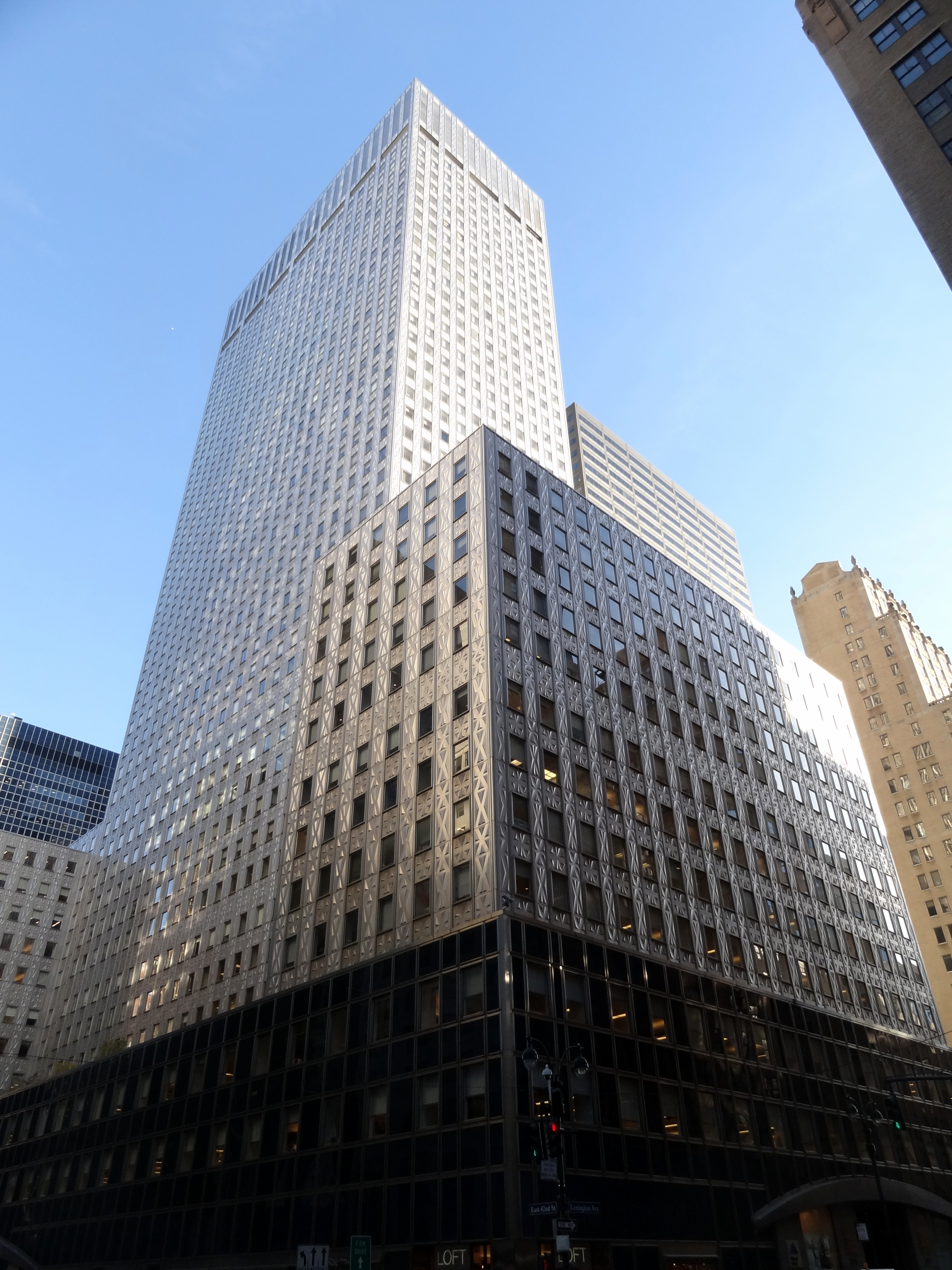
Building hosting the Consulate-General in New York City

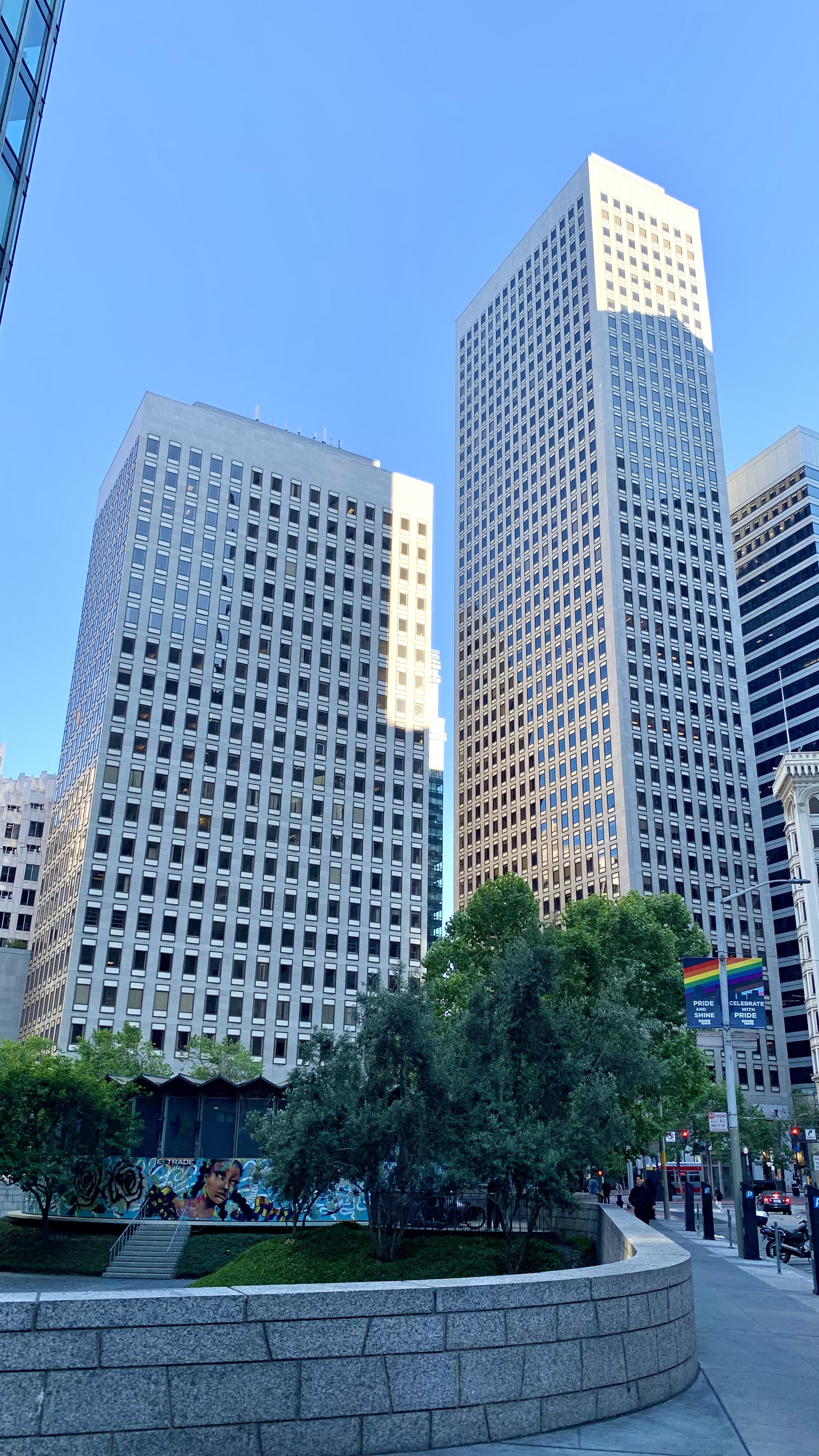
Building (on the left) hosting the Consulate-General in San Francisco

=== Asia ===
Host country	Host city	Mission	Year opened	Concurrent accreditation	Ref.
Bangladesh	Dhaka	High Commission	1972		
Brunei	Bandar Seri Begawan	High Commission	1979		
Cambodia	Phnom Penh	Embassy	1957		
China	Beijing	Embassy	1973		
China	Chengdu	Consulate-General	2013		
China	Guangzhou	Consulate-General	1992		
China	Hong Kong	Consulate-General	1972		
China	Shanghai	Consulate-General	1984		
India	New Delhi	High Commission	1943	Countries: Bhutan	
India	Bengaluru	Consulate-General	2023	Countries: Bhutan	
India	Chennai	Consulate-General	2007	Countries: Bhutan	
India	Kolkata	Consulate-General	1970	Countries: Bhutan	
India	Mumbai	Consulate-General	1967	Countries: Bhutan	
Indonesia	Jakarta	Embassy	1950		
Indonesia	Denpasar	Consulate-General	1981		
Indonesia	Makassar	Consulate-General	2016		
Indonesia	Surabaya	Consulate-General	2017		
Iraq	Baghdad	Embassy	1974		
Israel	Tel Aviv	Embassy	1949		
Japan	Tokyo	Embassy	1940 (Note: closed in 1941, reopened in 1947)		
Japan	Osaka	Consulate-General	1947		
Jordan	Amman	Embassy	1975		
Kuwait	Kuwait City	Embassy	2004		
Laos	Vientiane	Embassy	1963		
Lebanon	Beirut	Embassy	1967		
Malaysia	Kuala Lumpur	High Commission	1955		
Maldives	Malé	High Commission	2023		
Mongolia	Ulaanbaatar	Embassy	2015		
Myanmar	Yangon	Embassy	1956		
Nepal	Kathmandu	Embassy	1960		
Pakistan	Islamabad	High Commission	1949		
Palestine	Ramallah	Representative Office	2000		
Philippines	Manila	Embassy	1946		
Qatar	Doha	Embassy	2016		
Republic of China (Taiwan) (Note: Australia does not have formal relations with Taiwan, since the establishment of relations with the People's Republic of China in 1973. Nonetheless, its office in Taipei functions as a de facto embassy.)	Taipei	Office	1981		
Saudi Arabia	Riyadh	Embassy	1974	Countries: Bahrain; Oman; Yemen	
Singapore	Singapore	High Commission	1965		
South Korea	Seoul	Embassy	1962	Countries: North Korea	
Sri Lanka	Colombo	High Commission	1946		
Thailand	Bangkok	Embassy	1952		
Thailand	Phuket	Consulate-General	2016		
Timor-Leste	Dili	Embassy	2002		
Turkey	Ankara	Embassy	1968	Countries: Azerbaijan; Georgia	
Turkey	Istanbul	Consulate-General	2006	Countries: Azerbaijan; Georgia	
Turkey	Çanakkale	Consulate	2006	Countries: Azerbaijan; Georgia	
United Arab Emirates	Abu Dhabi	Embassy	1999		
United Arab Emirates	Dubai	Consulate-General	2000		
Vietnam	Hanoi	Embassy	1952		
Vietnam	Ho Chi Minh City	Consulate-General	1994		

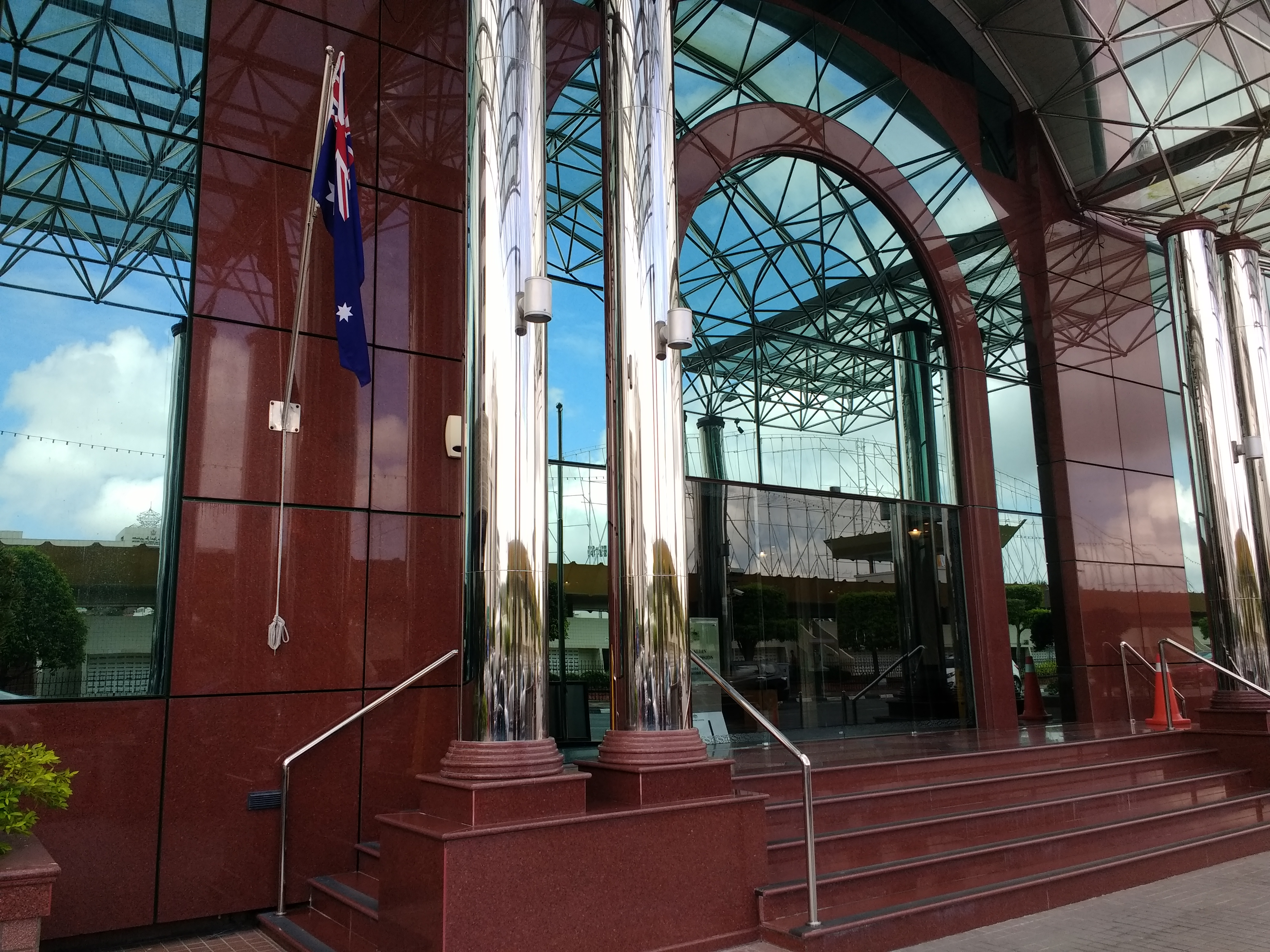
High Commission in Bandar Seri Begawan

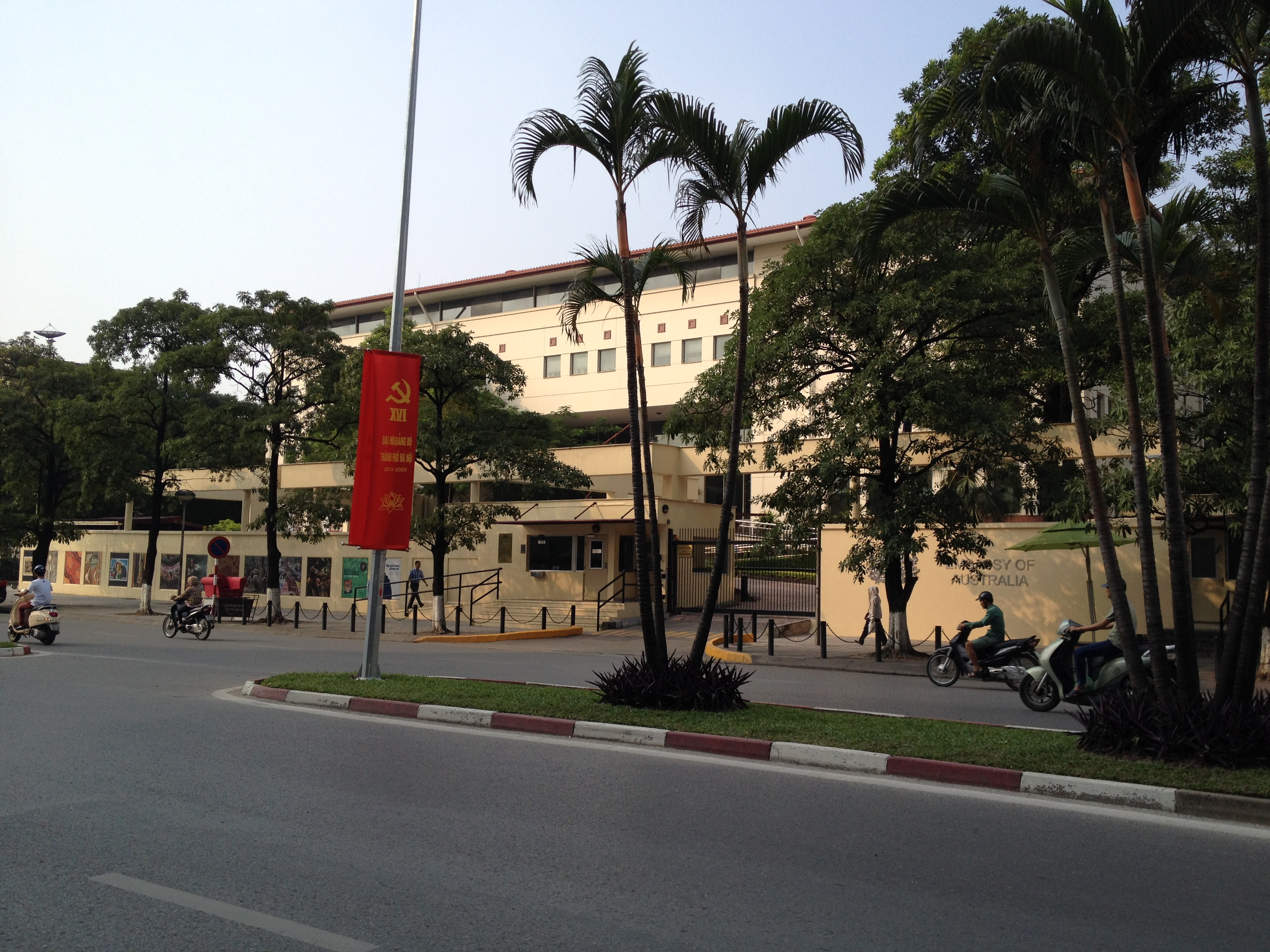
Embassy in Hanoi

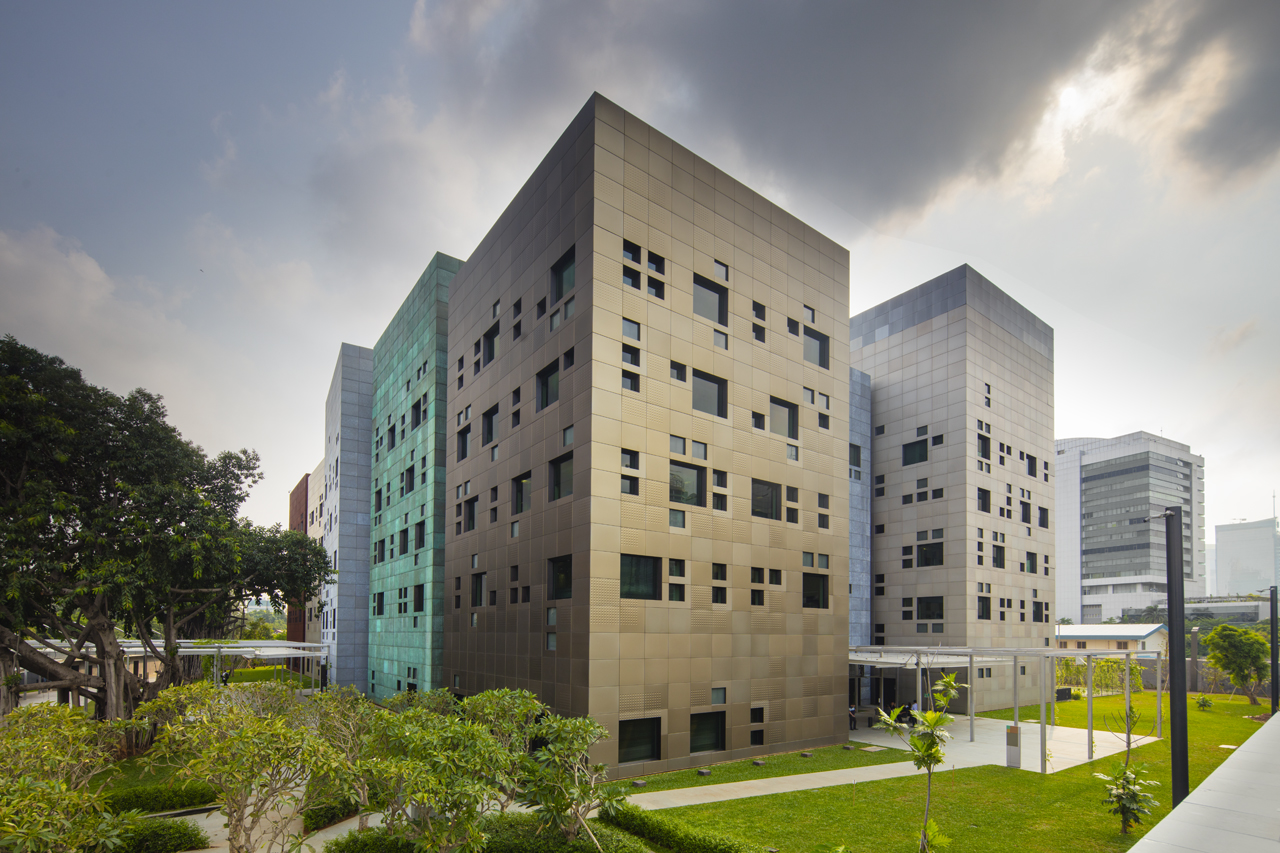
Embassy in Jakarta

Building hosting the Embassy in Manila

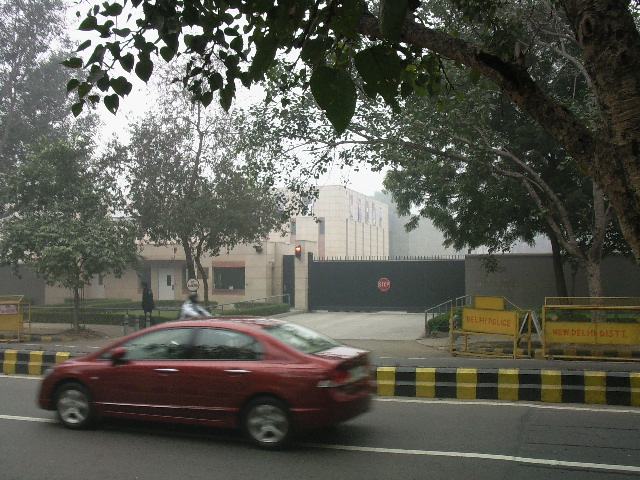
High Commission in New Delhi

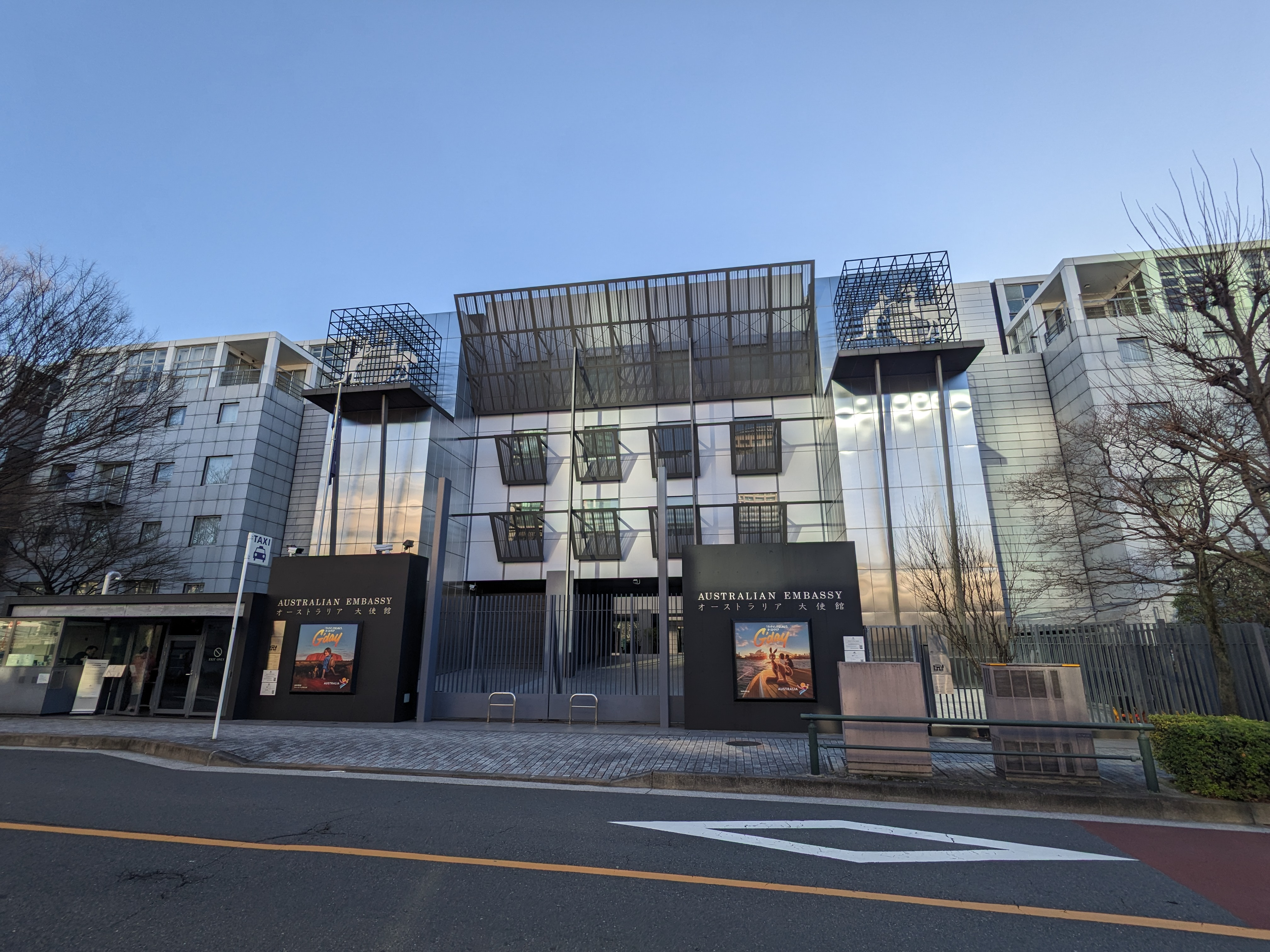
Embassy in Tokyo

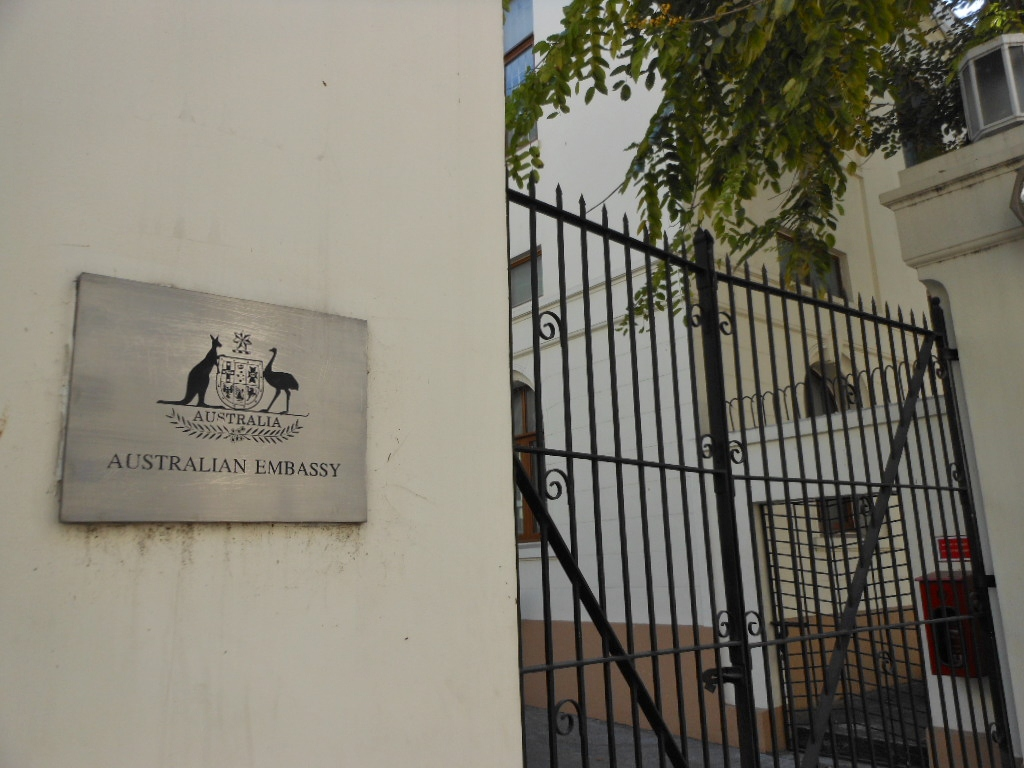
Embassy in Yangon

=== Europe ===
Host country	Host city	Mission	Year opened	Concurrent accreditation	Ref.
Austria	Vienna	Embassy	1966	Countries: Bosnia and Herzegovina; Hungary; Slovakia; Slovenia; International Organizations: United Nations; International Atomic Energy Agency; OSCE; UNCITRAL; UNODC	
Belgium	Brussels	Embassy	1959	Countries: Luxembourg; International Organizations: European Union; NATO	
Croatia	Zagreb	Embassy	1992	Countries: Kosovo	
Cyprus	Nicosia	High Commission	1975		
Denmark	Copenhagen	Embassy	1970	Countries: Iceland; Norway	
Estonia	Tallinn	"Pop-up" Embassy	2018		
France	Paris	Embassy	1945	Countries: Algeria; Chad; Mauritania; Monaco	
France	Nouméa, New Caledonia	Consulate-General	1940	Countries: Algeria; Chad; Mauritania; Monaco	
France	Papeete, French Polynesia	Consulate-General	2021	Countries: Algeria; Chad; Mauritania; Monaco	
Germany	Berlin	Embassy	1952		
Germany	Frankfurt	Consulate-General	2019		
Greece	Athens	Embassy	1964	Countries: Bulgaria; Romania	
Holy See	Rome (Note: The Australian Embassy to the Holy See is located outside Vatican territory in Rome.)	Embassy	2008		
Ireland	Dublin	Embassy	1946		
Italy	Rome	Embassy	1949	Countries: Albania; Libya; San Marino; International Organizations: Food and Agriculture Organization; International Fund for Agricultural Development; World Food Programme	
Italy	Milan	Consulate-General	1968	Countries: Albania; Libya; San Marino; International Organizations: Food and Agriculture Organization; International Fund for Agricultural Development; World Food Programme	
Malta	Valletta	High Commission	1967	Countries: Tunisia	
Netherlands	The Hague	Embassy	1942		
North Cyprus	Nicosia	High Commission annex office (Note: According to the Department of Foreign Affairs and Trade, the High Commission in Nicosia has an annex in North Nicosia.)			
Poland	Warsaw	Embassy	1973	Countries: Czech Republic; Lithuania	
Portugal	Lisbon	Embassy	1970	Countries: Cape Verde; Guinea-Bissau; São Tomé and Príncipe	
Russia	Moscow	Embassy	1943	Countries: Armenia; Belarus; Kazakhstan; Kyrgyzstan; Tajikistan; Turkmenistan; Uzbekistan	
Serbia	Belgrade	Embassy	1967	Countries: Montenegro; North Macedonia	
Spain	Madrid	Embassy	1969	Countries: Andorra; Equatorial Guinea	
Sweden	Stockholm	Embassy	1961	Countries: Finland; Latvia	
Switzerland	Bern	Embassy	1961 (Note: Closed in 2014; reopened in 2022.)	Countries: Liechtenstein	
Switzerland	Geneva	Consulate-General	1961	Countries: Liechtenstein	
Ukraine	Kyiv	Embassy	2014	Countries: Moldova	
United Kingdom	London	High Commission	1910	International Organizations: Commonwealth of Nations; International Maritime Organization	

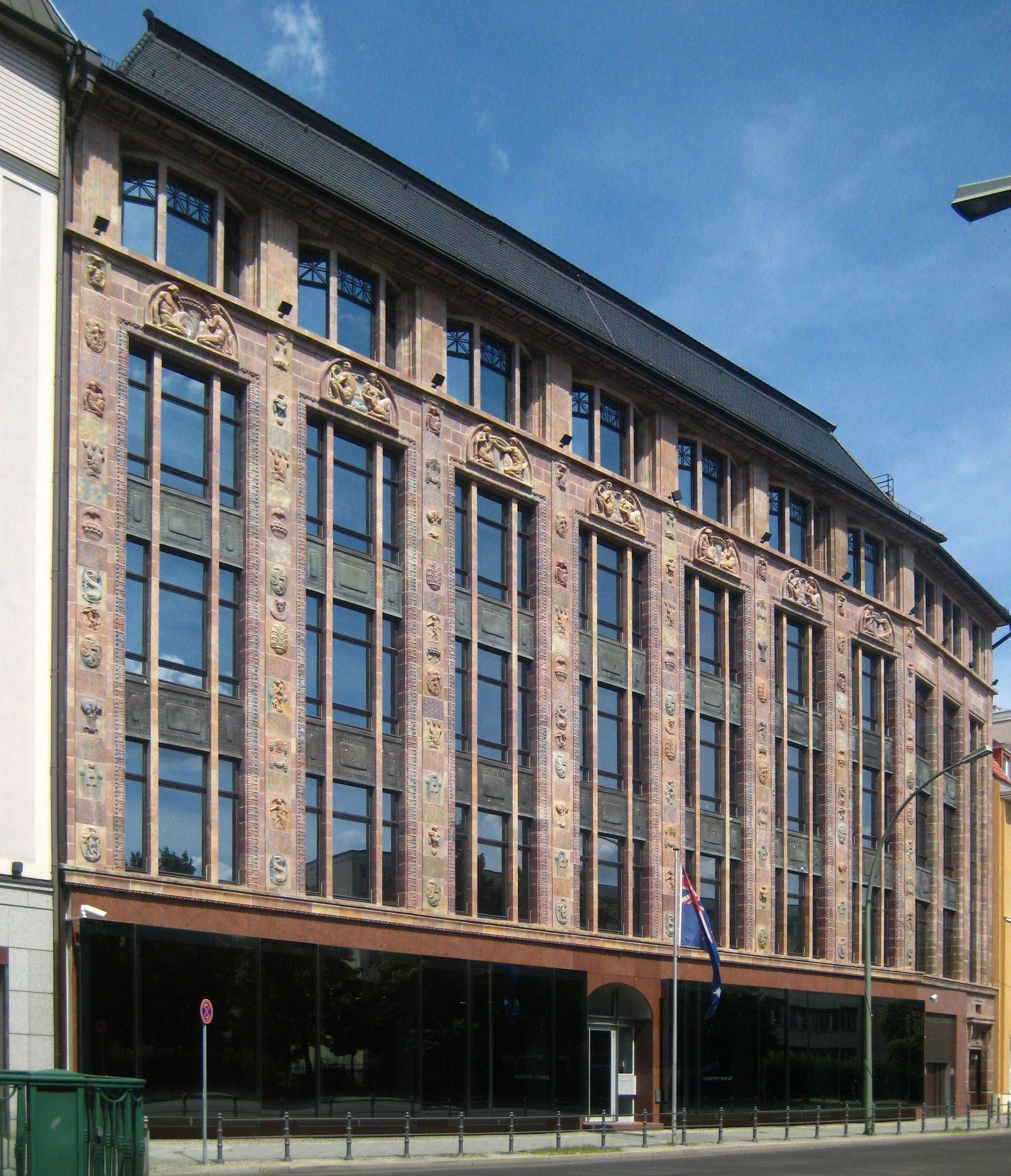
Embassy in Berlin

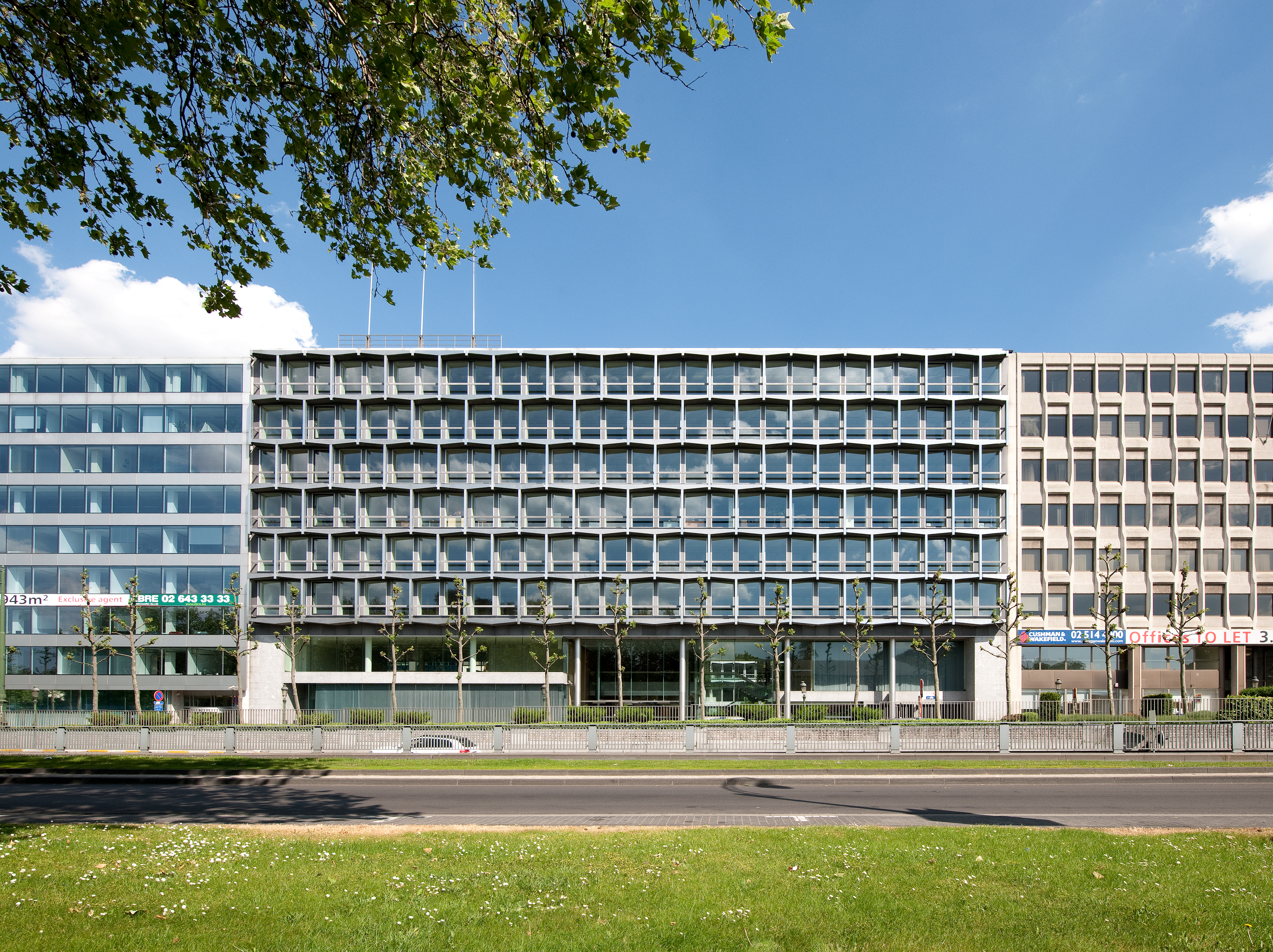
Building hosting the Embassy in Brussels

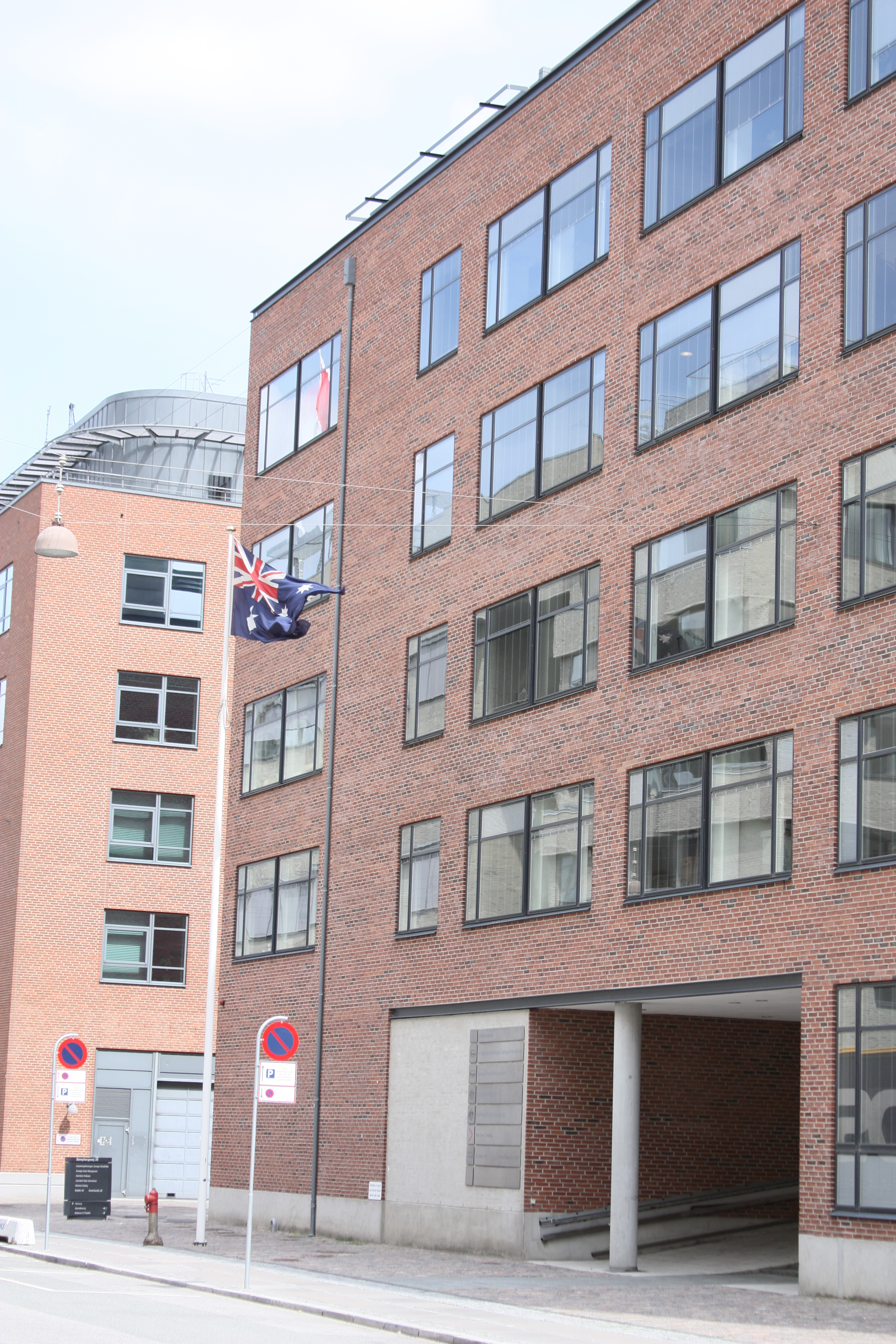
Embassy in Copenhagen

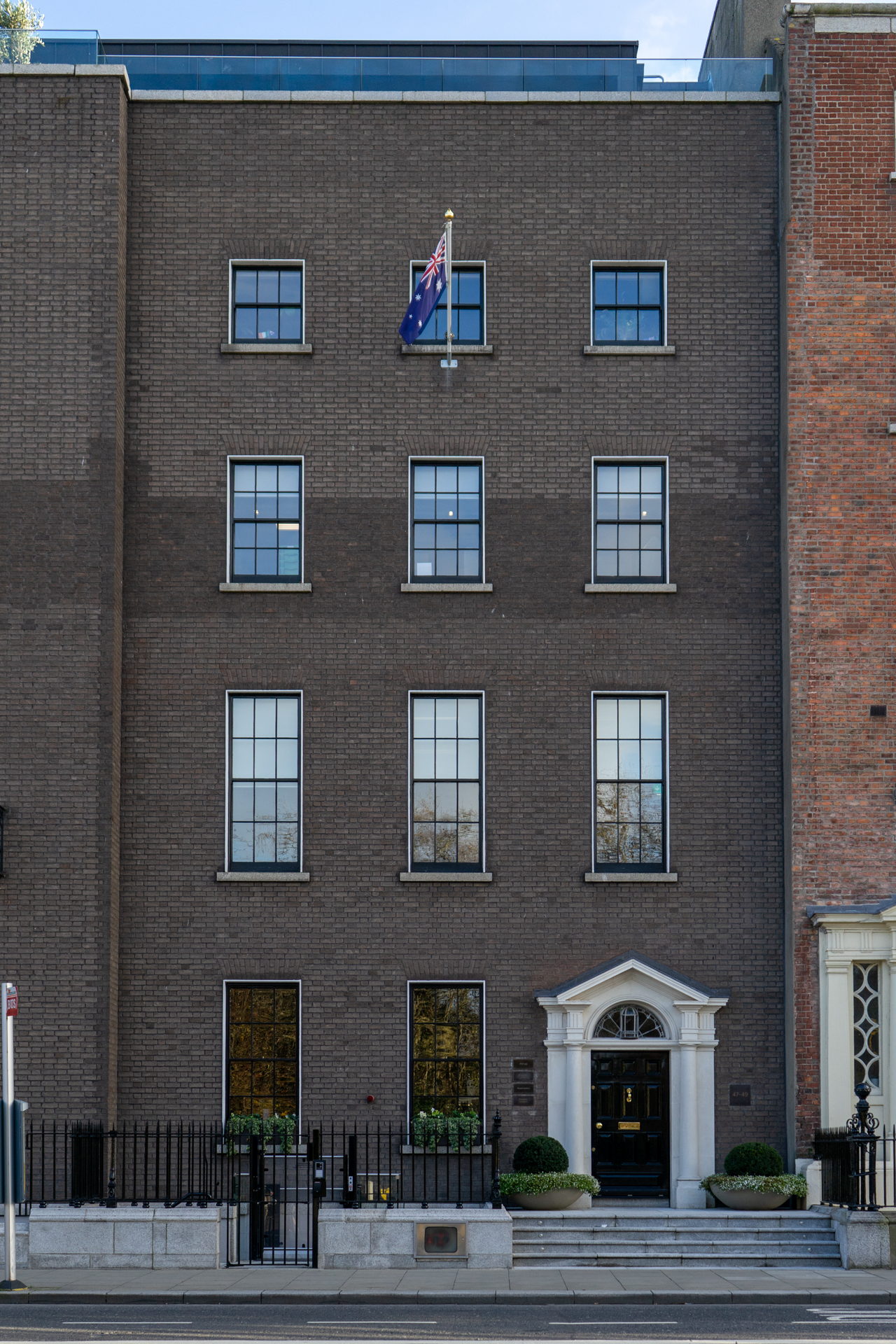
Embassy in Dublin

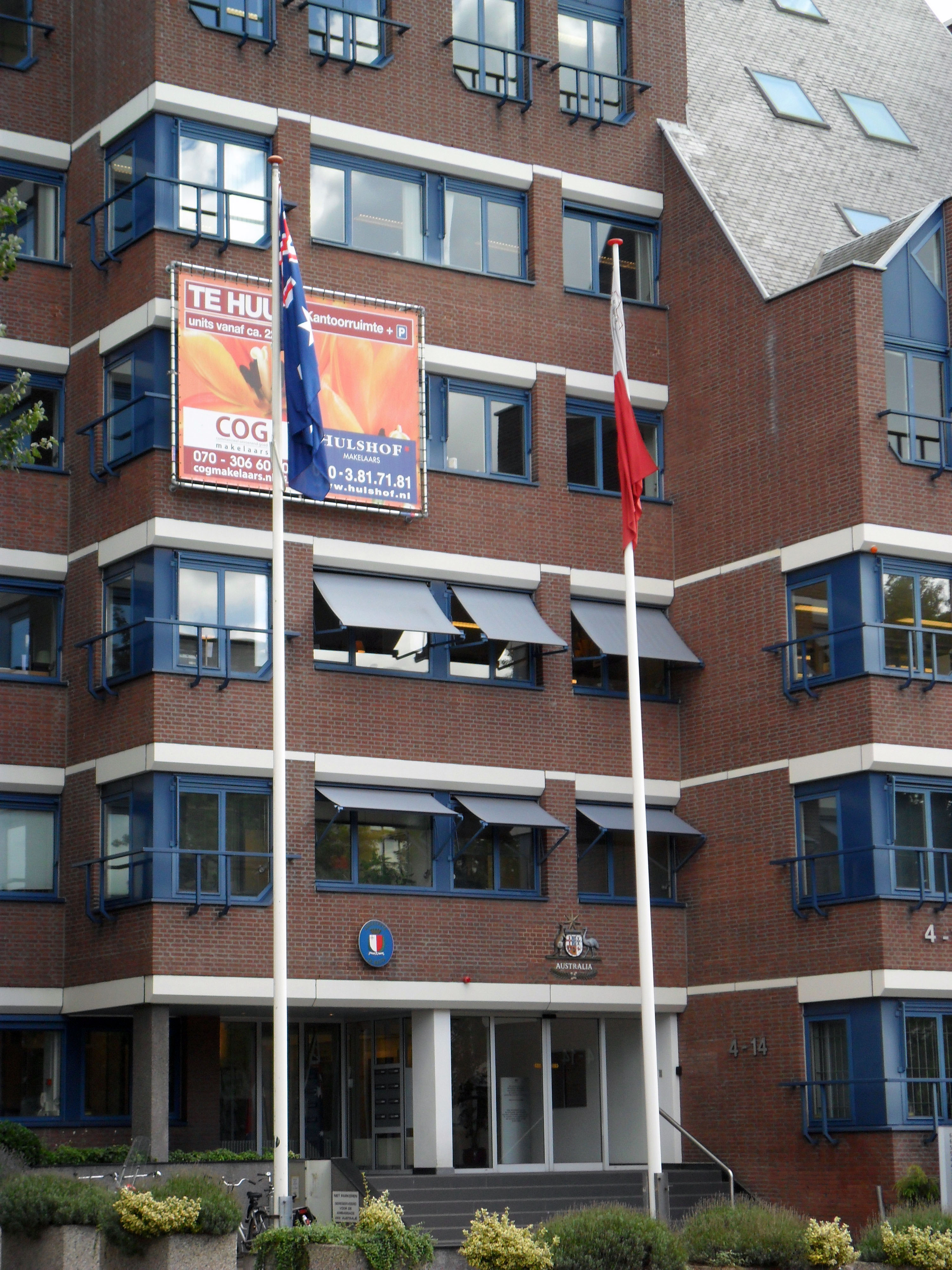
Embassy in The Hague

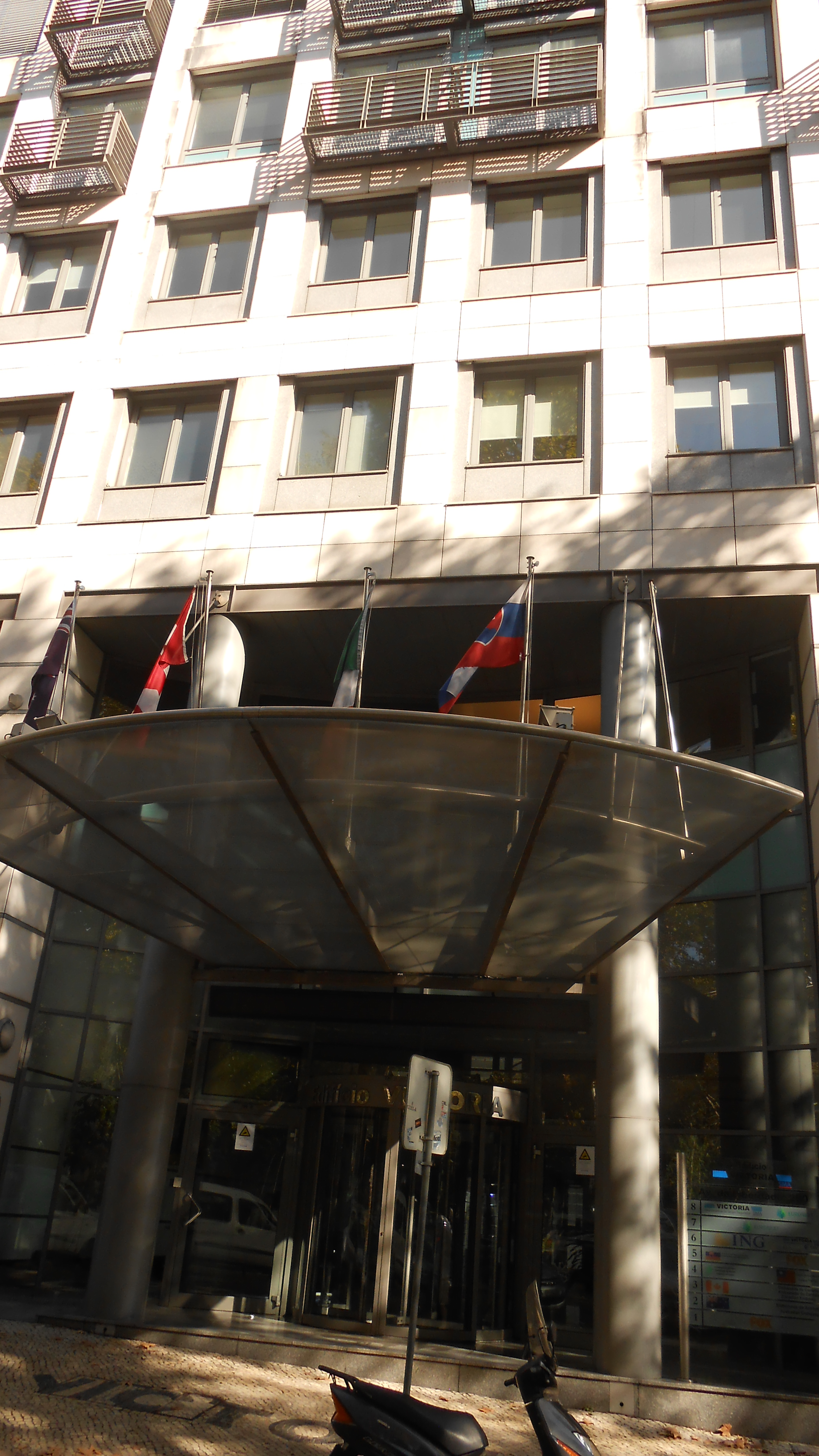
Building hosting the embassy in Lisbon

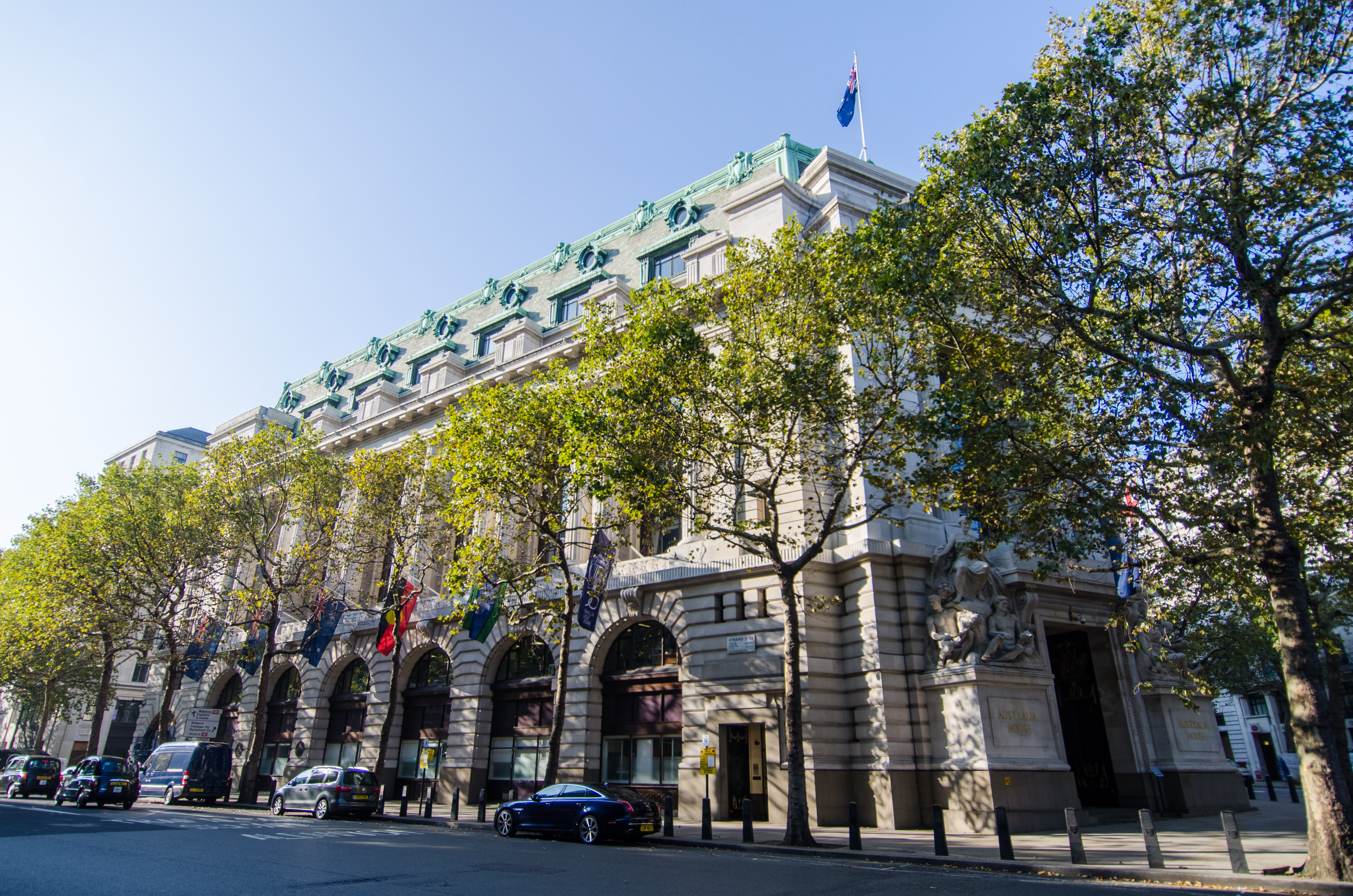
High Commission in London

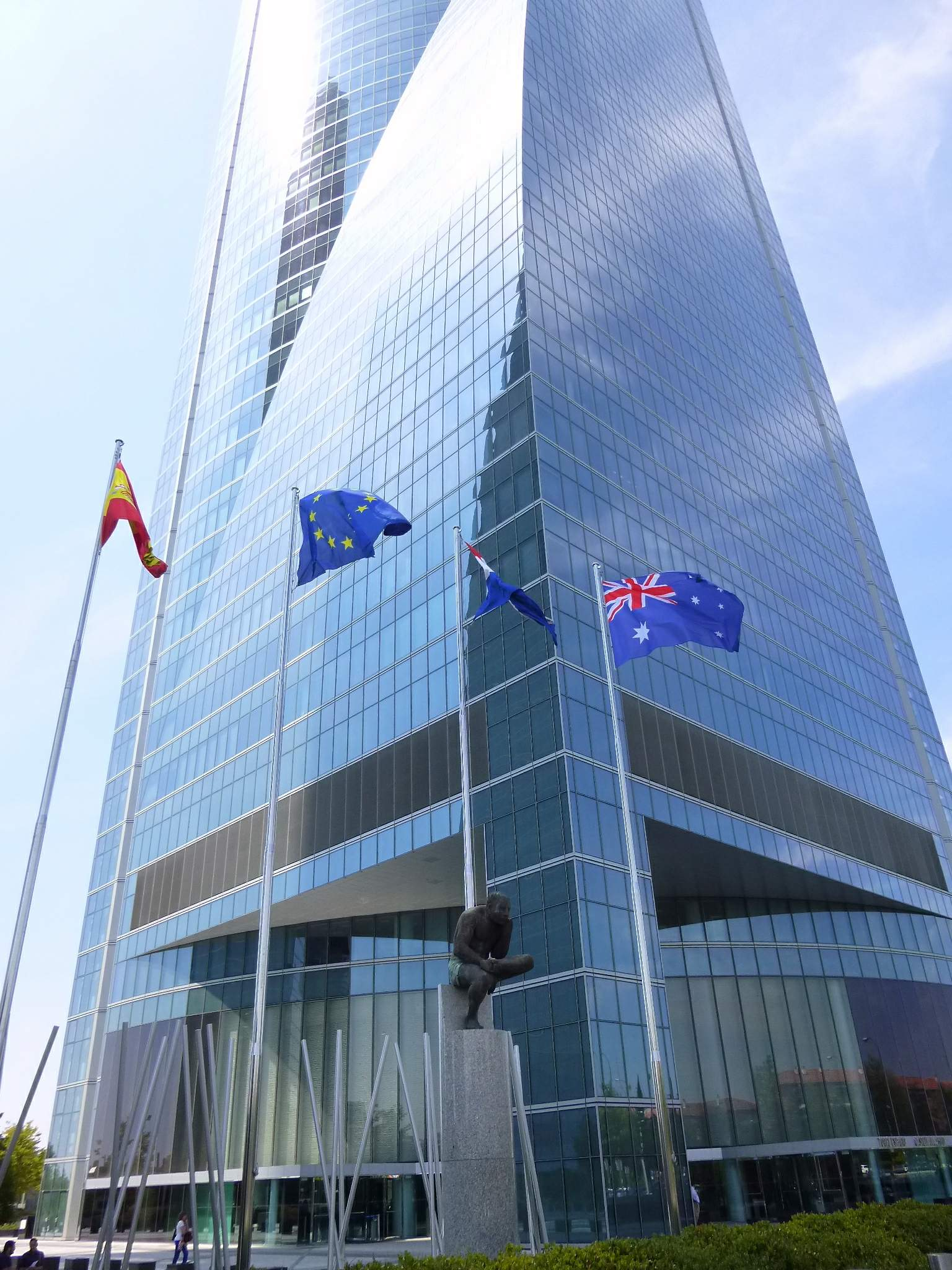
Building hosting the embassy in Madrid

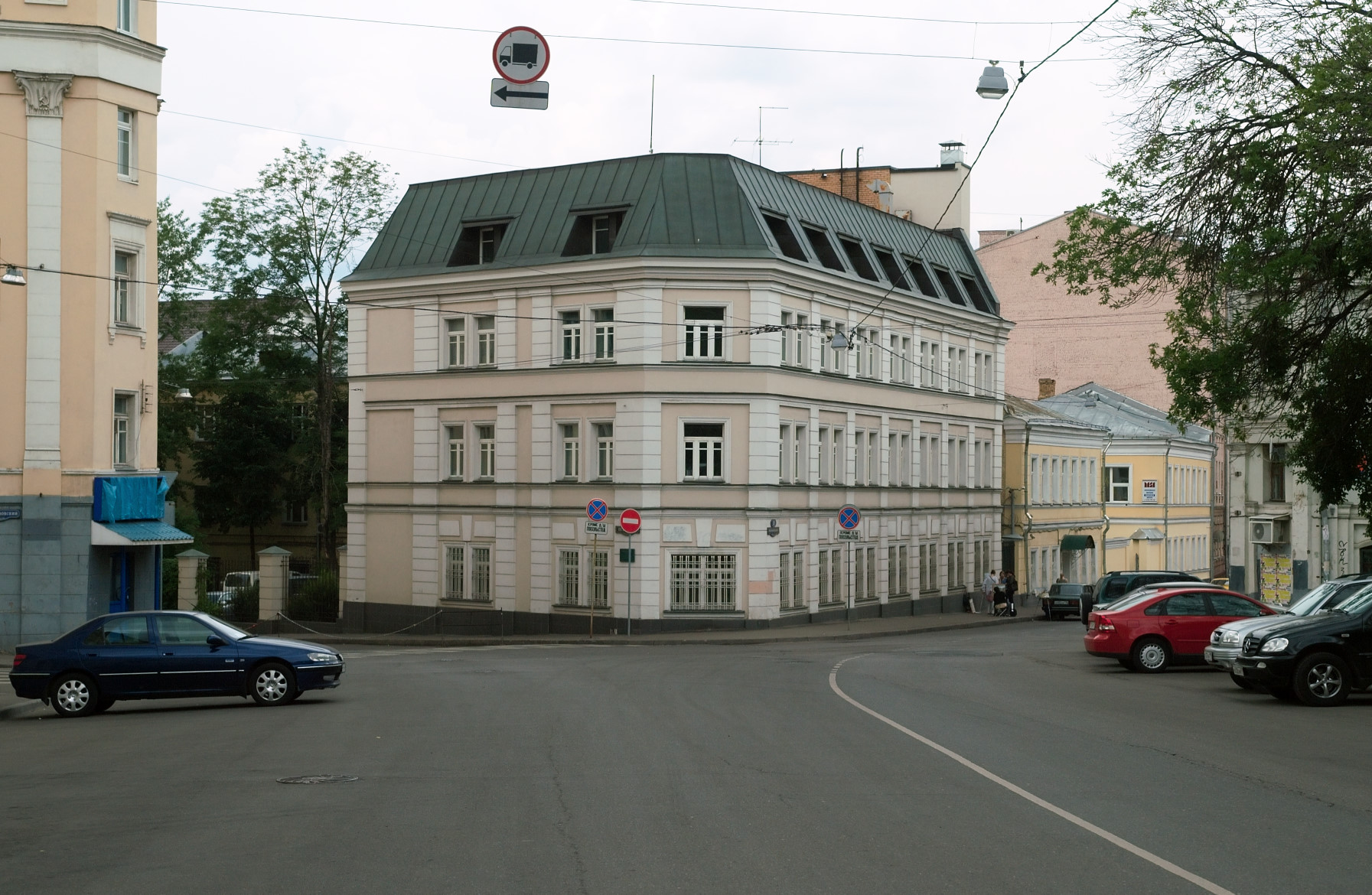
Embassy in Moscow

Embassy in Paris

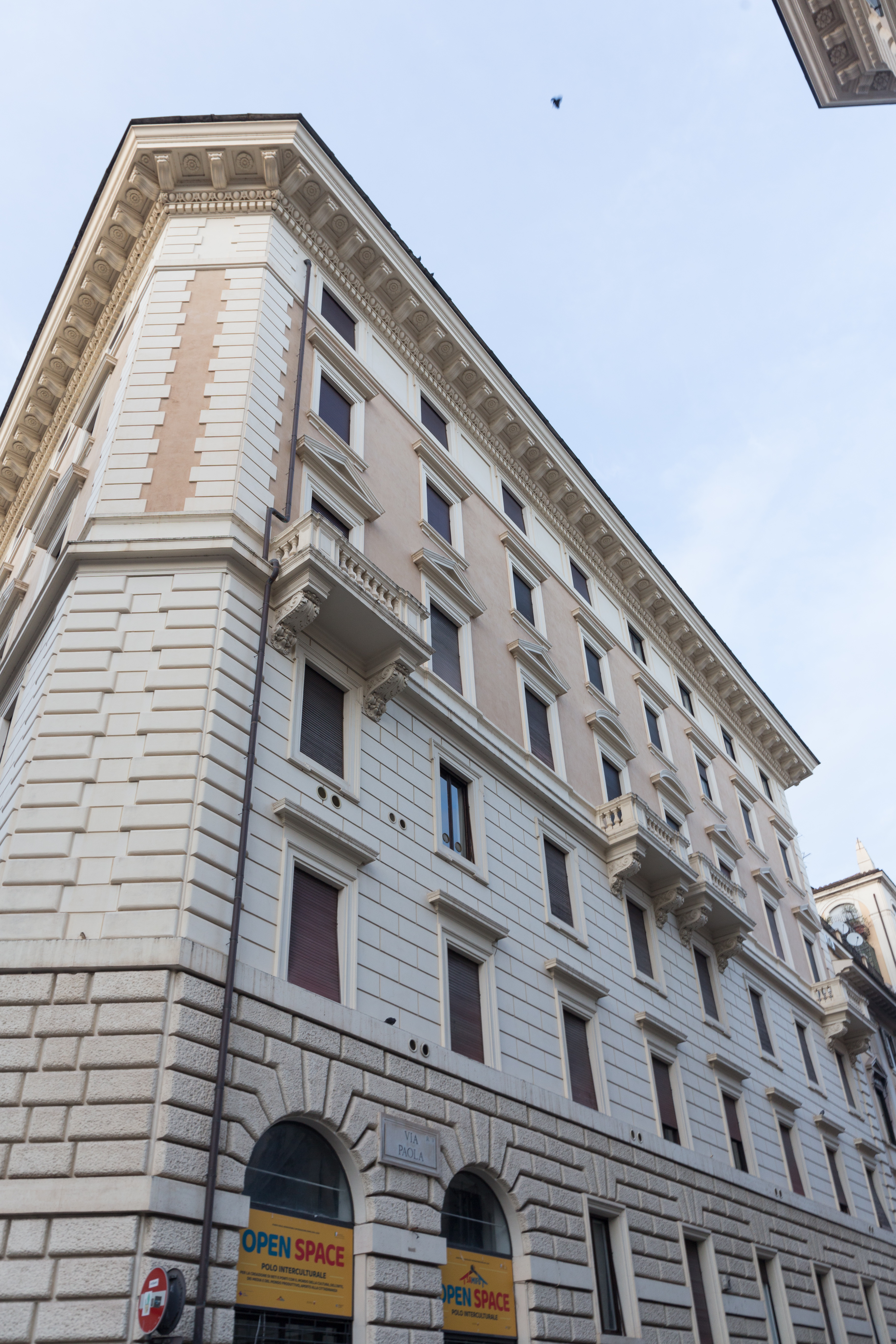
Building hosting the Embassy to the Holy See in Rome

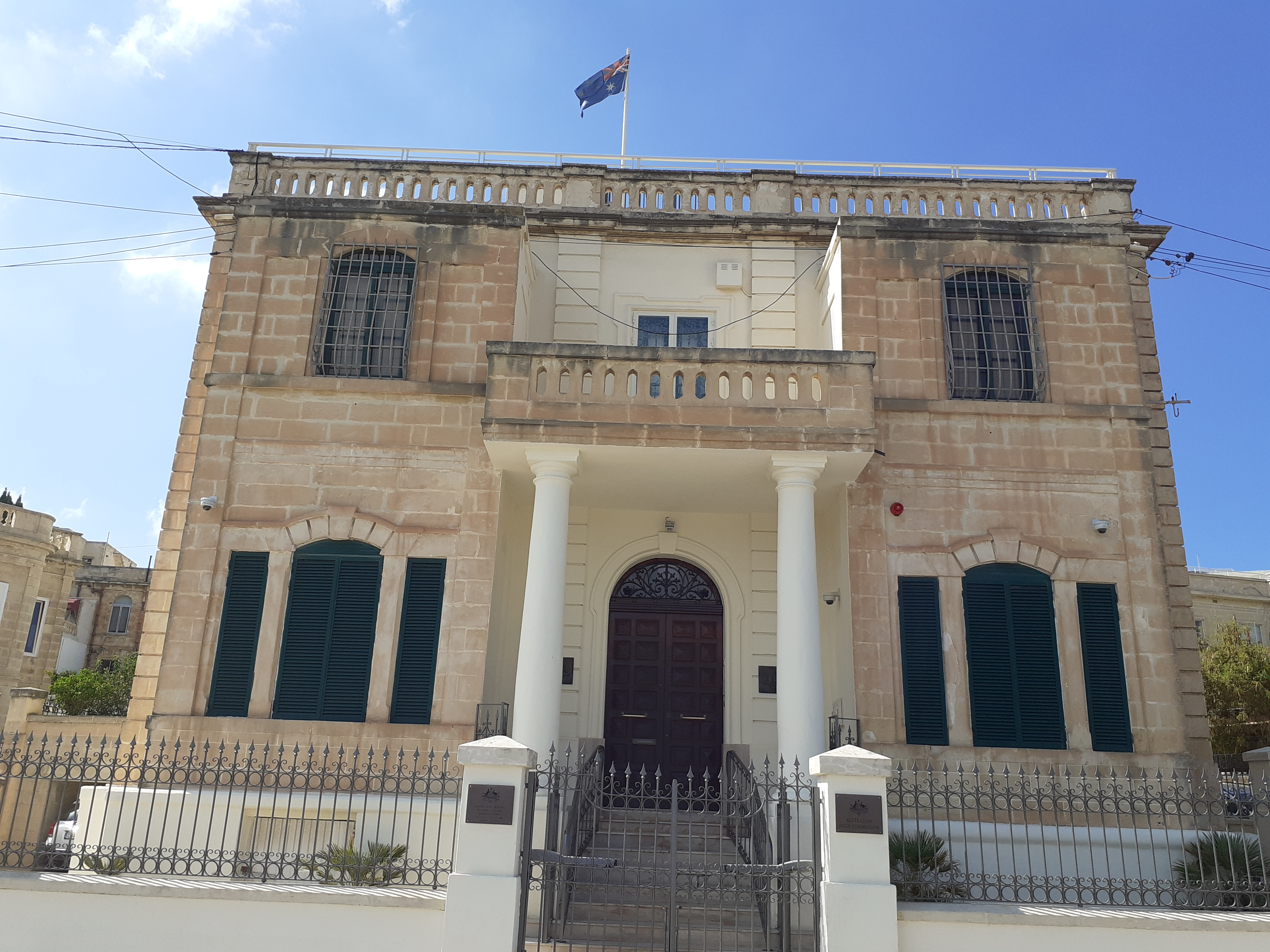
High Commission in Valletta

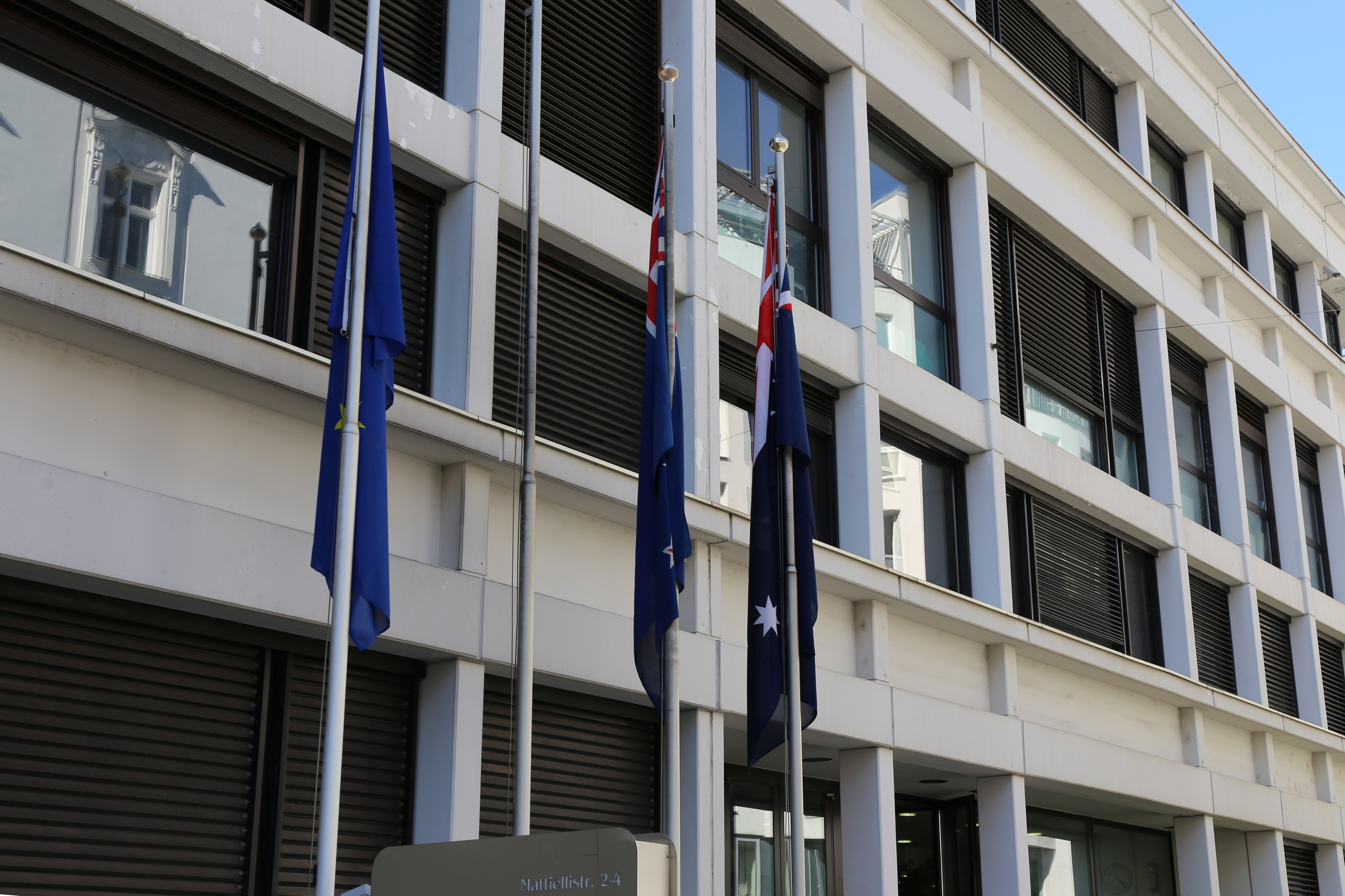
Embassy in Vienna

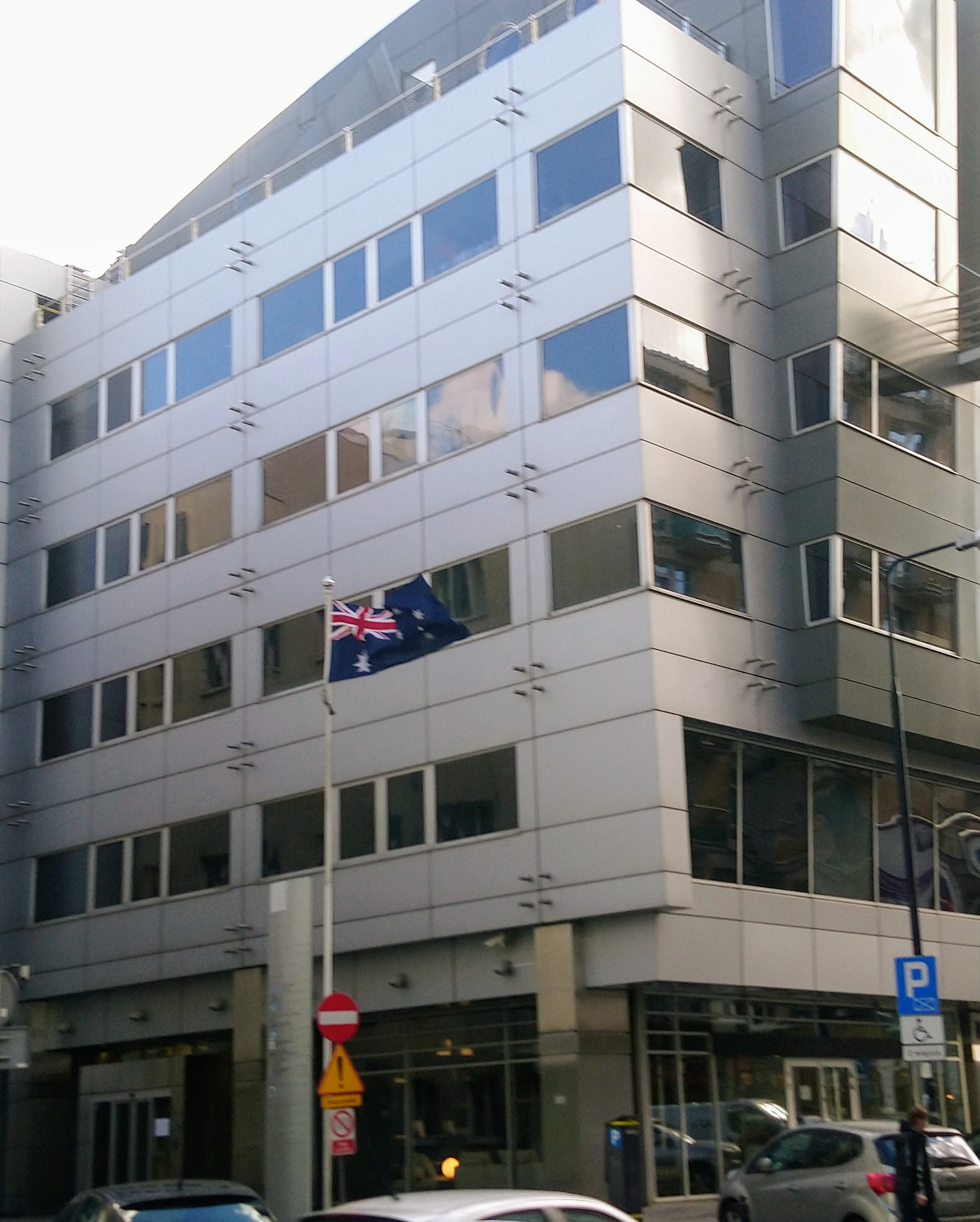
Embassy in Warsaw

=== Oceania ===
Host country	Host city	Mission	Year opened	Concurrent accreditation	Ref.
Cook Islands	Avarua	High Commission	1994		
Fiji	Suva	High Commission	1964	International Organizations: Pacific Islands Forum	
Kiribati	Tarawa	High Commission	1982		
Marshall Islands	Majuro	Embassy	2021		
Micronesia	Kolonia	Embassy	1987		
Nauru	Yaren	High Commission	1968		
New Zealand	Wellington	High Commission	1943		
New Zealand	Auckland	Consulate-General	2008		
Niue	Alofi	High Commission	2020		
Palau	Koror	Embassy	2019		
Papua New Guinea	Port Moresby	High Commission	1973		
Papua New Guinea	Lae	Consulate-General	2017		
Samoa	Apia	High Commission	1977		
Solomon Islands	Honiara	High Commission	1982		
Tonga	Nukuʻalofa	High Commission	1980		
Tuvalu	Funafuti	High Commission	2018		
Vanuatu	Port Vila	High Commission	1980		

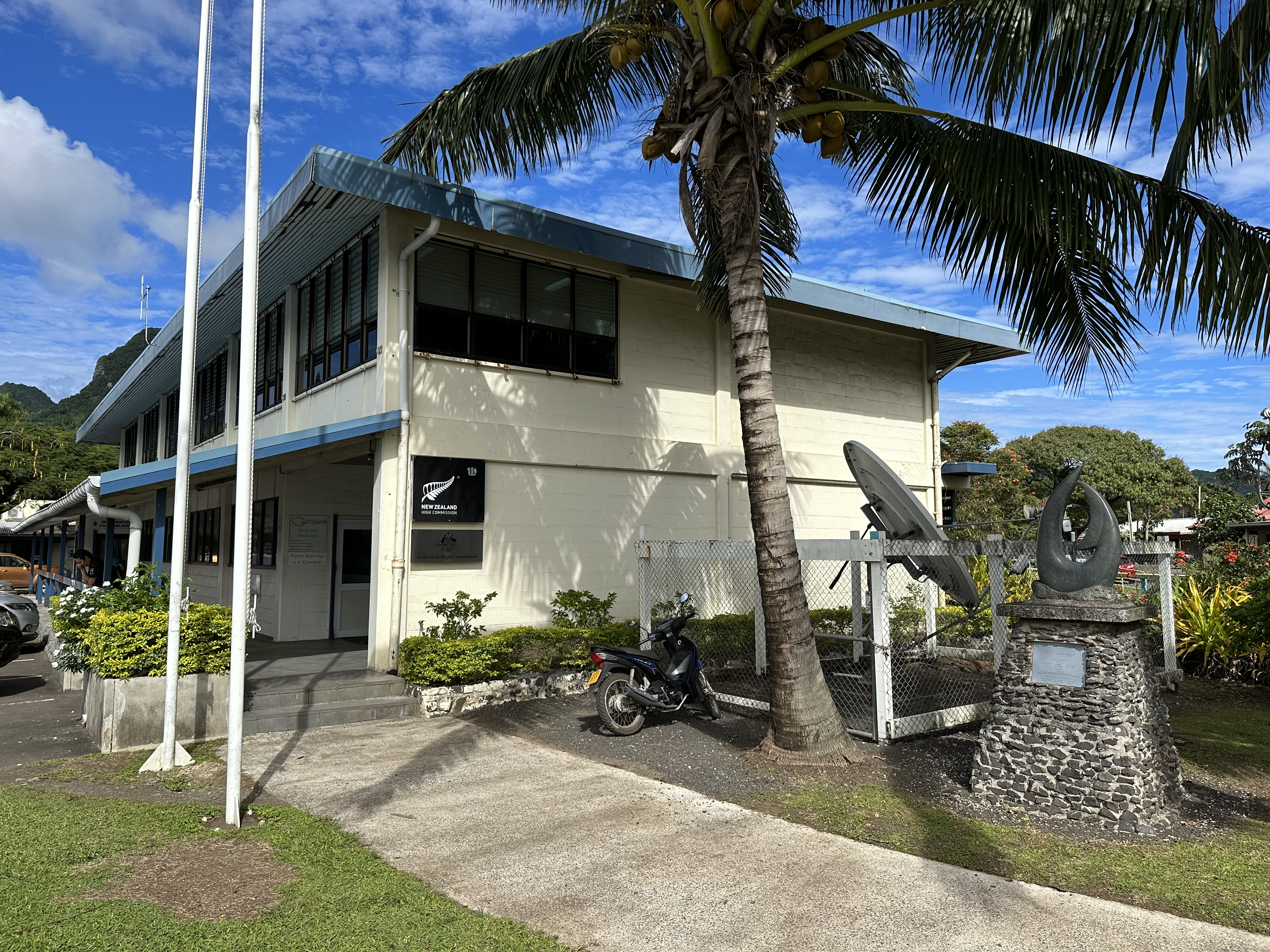
High Commission in Avarua

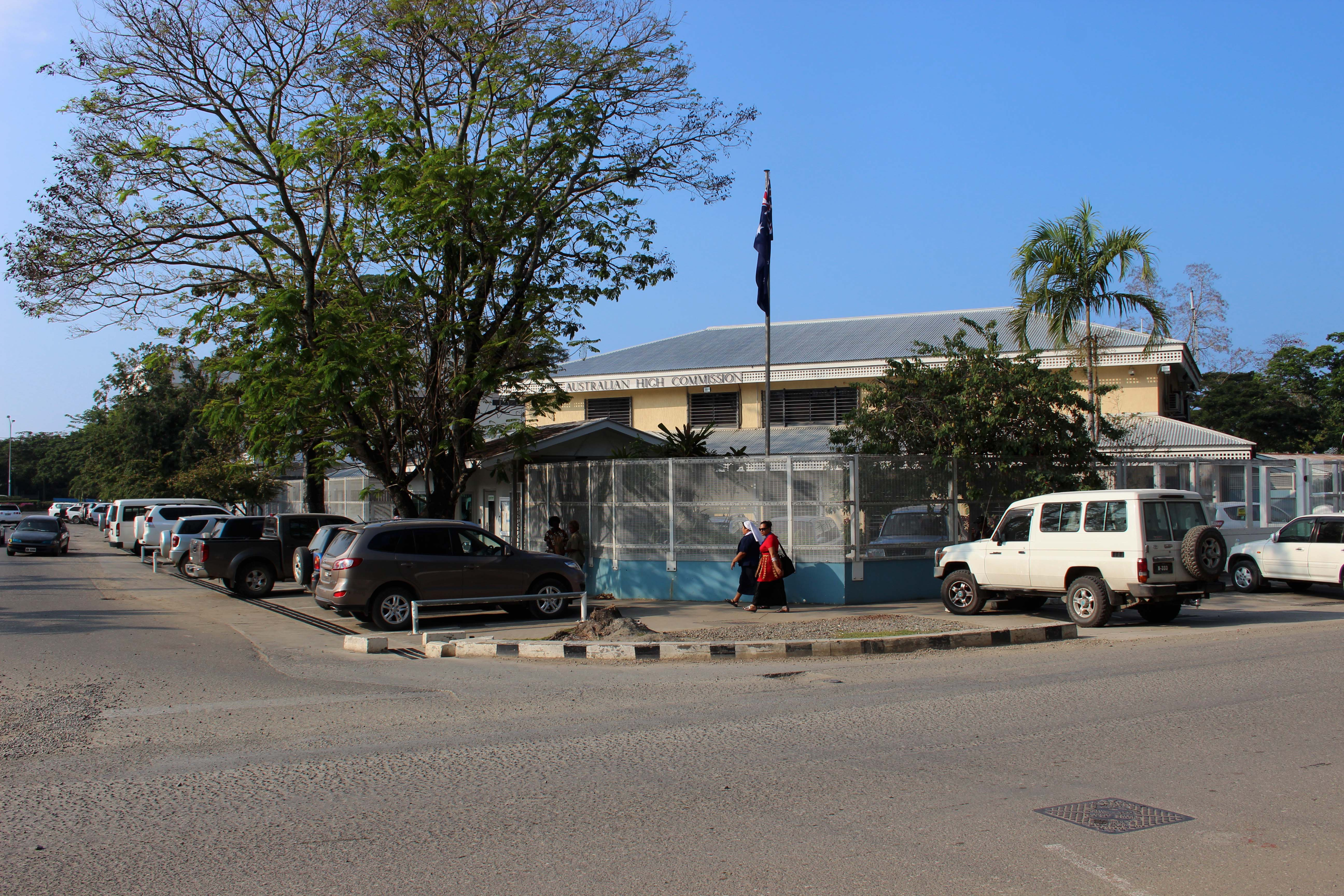
High Commission in Honiara

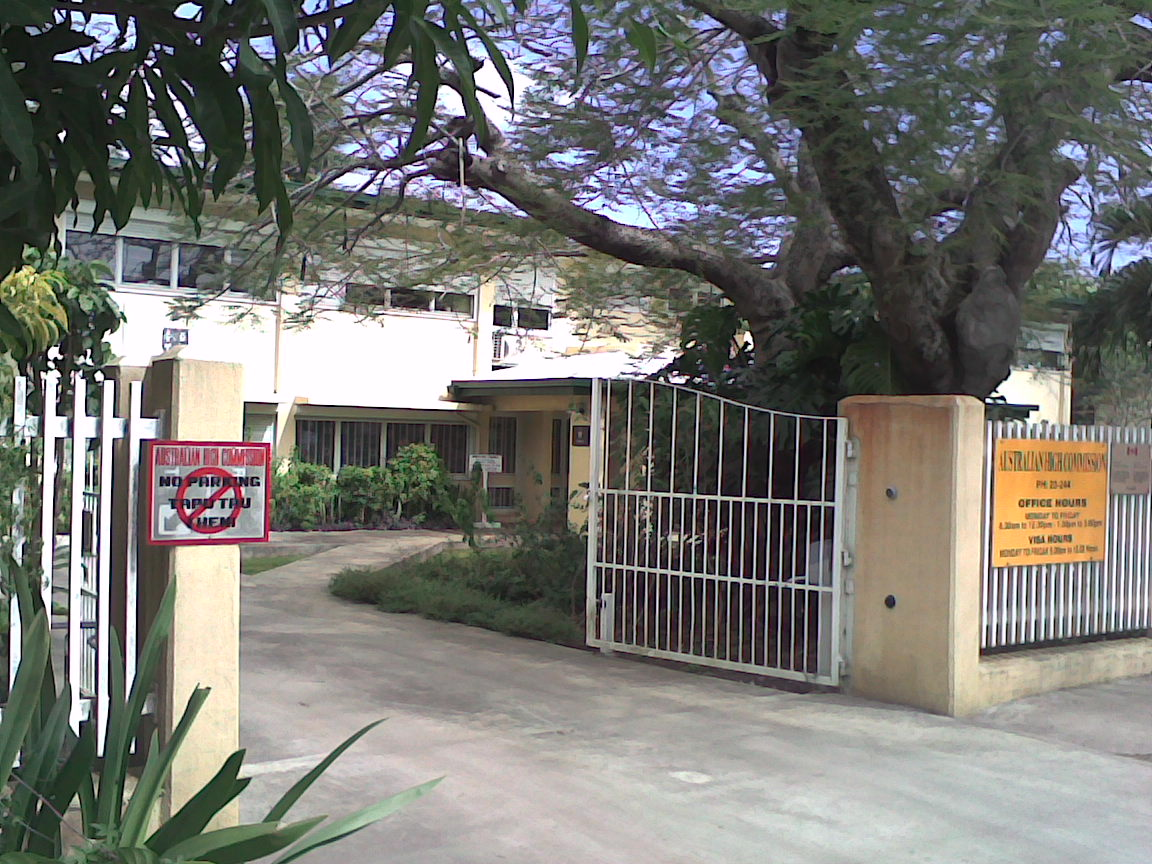
High Commission in Nuku'alofa

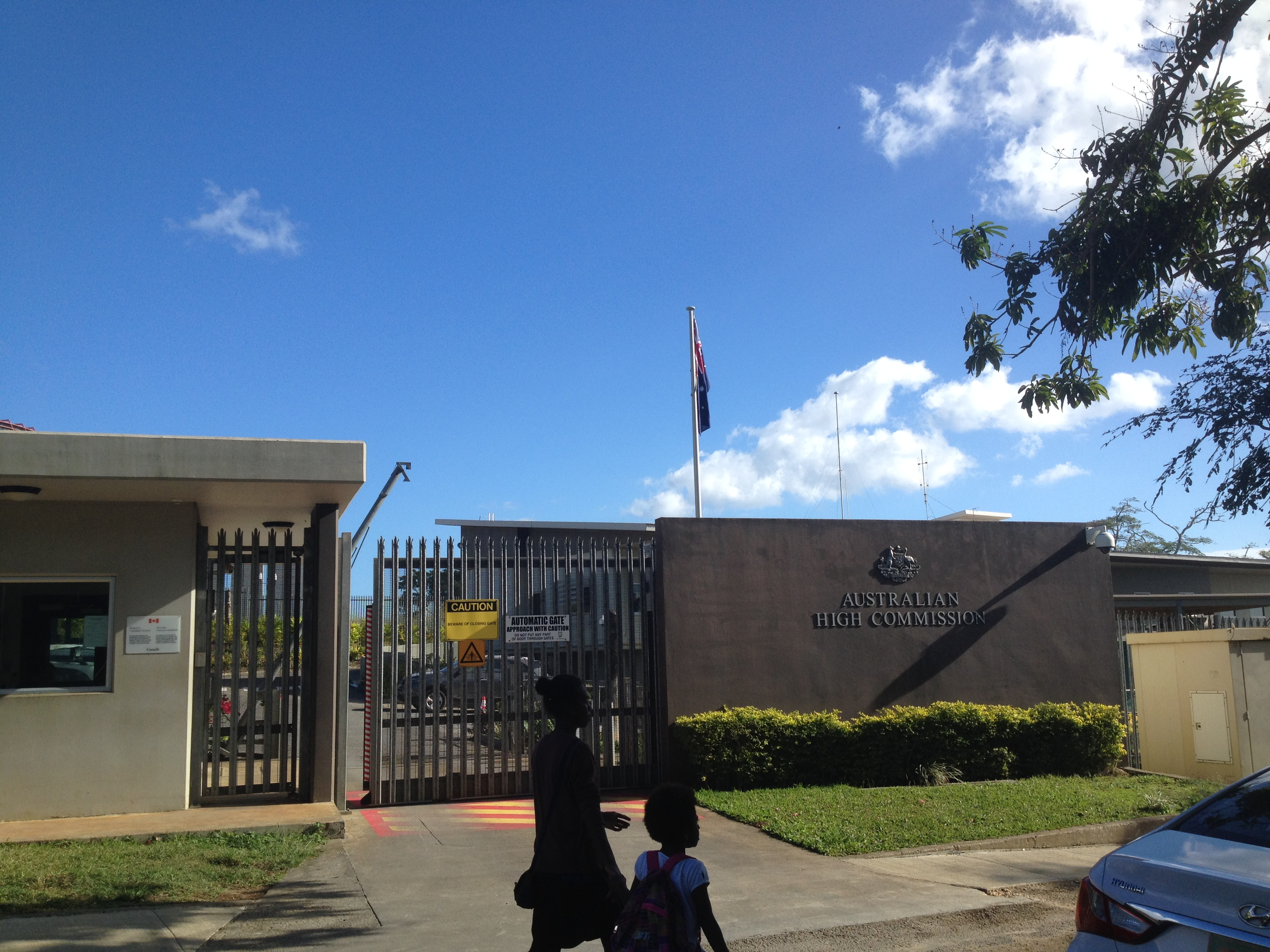
High Commission in Port Vila

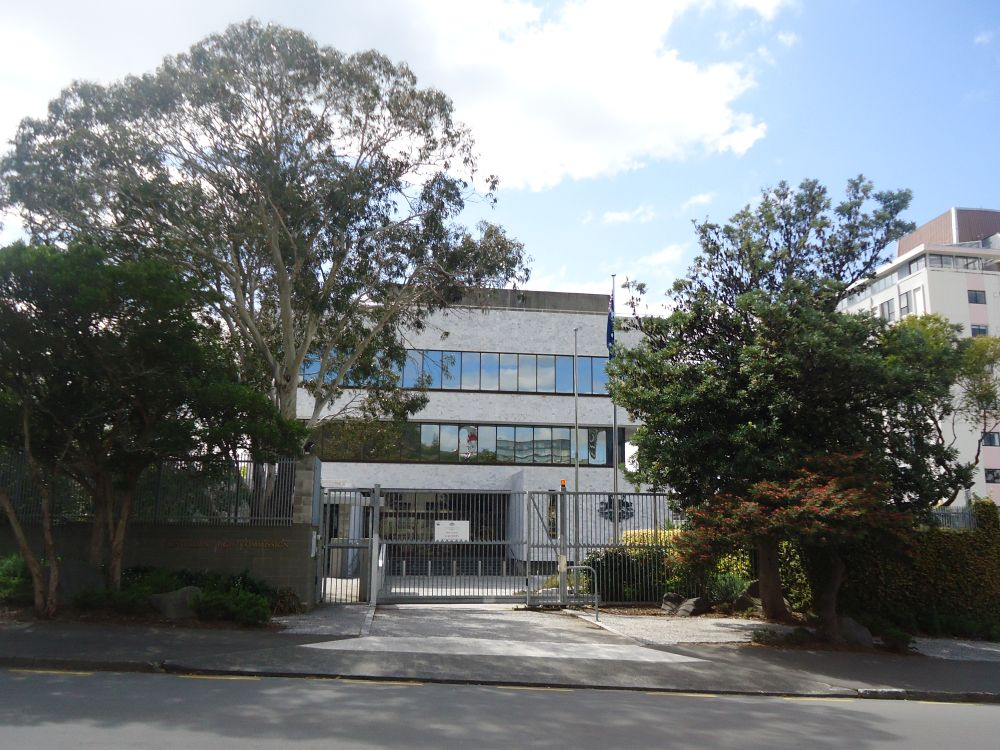
High Commission in Wellington

=== Multilateral organisations ===
Organization	Host city	Host country	Mission	Concurrent accreditation	Ref.
Association of Southeast Asian Nations	Jakarta	Indonesia	Mission		
OECD	Paris	France	Permanent Delegation		
Pacific Community	Nouméa	New Caledonia, France	Mission		
United Nations	New York City	United States	Permanent Mission		
United Nations	Geneva	Switzerland	Permanent Mission	International Organizations: Conference on Disarmament; World Health Organization	
UNESCO	Paris	France	Permanent Delegation		
World Trade Organization	Geneva	Switzerland	Permanent Mission		

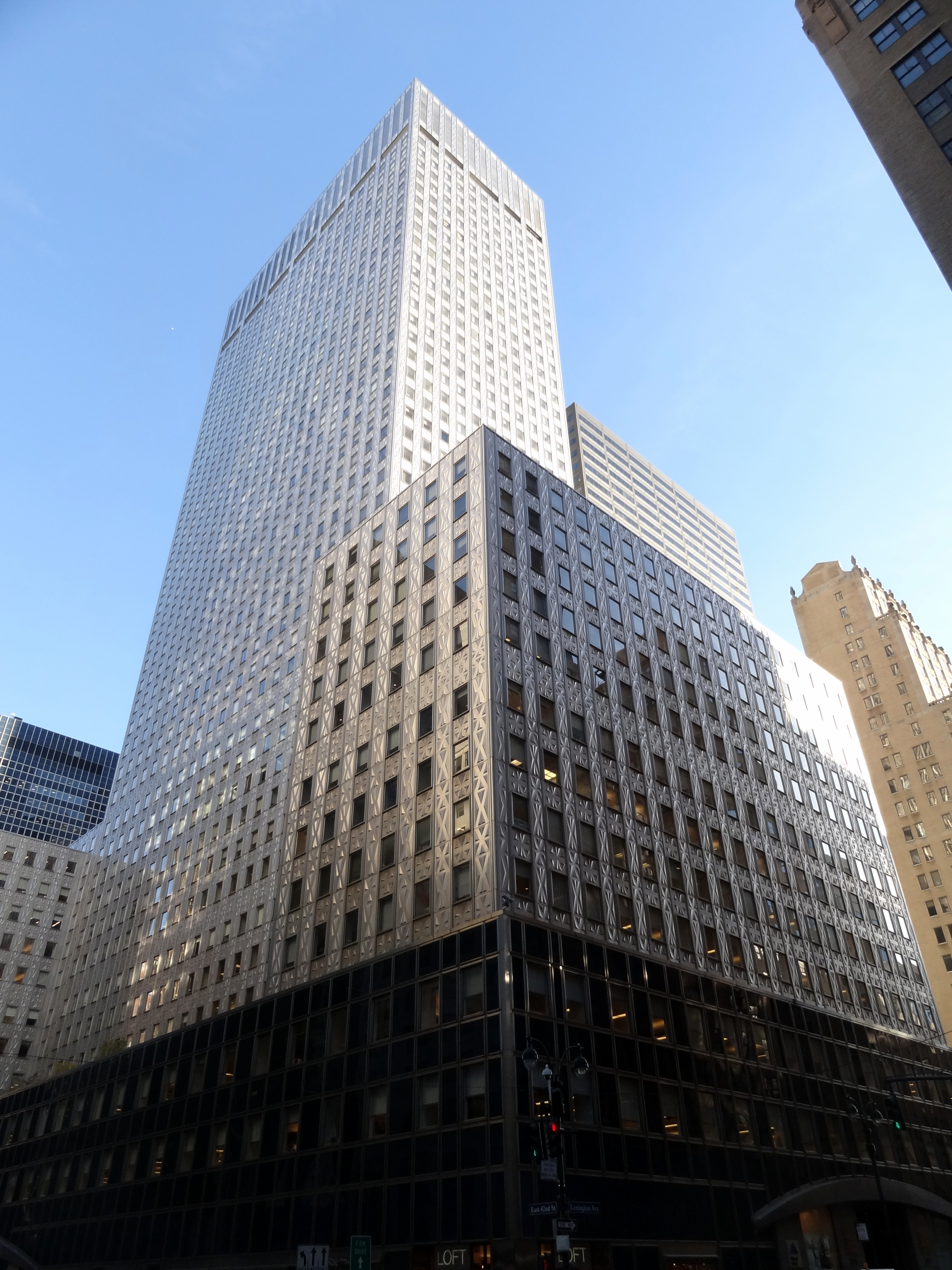
Building hosting the Permanent Mission to the United Nations in New York City

== Closed missions ==
=== Africa ===
Host country	Host city	Mission	Year closed	Ref.
Algeria	Algiers	Embassy (Note: Resident in Paris, Ile-de-France, France)	1991	
Libya	Tripoli	Consulate-General (Note: Resident in Rome, Lazio, Italy)	2011	
Tanzania	Dar Es Salaam	High Commission (Note: Resident in Nairobi, Kenya)	1987	
South Africa	Cape Town	Consulate	1984	
Zambia	Lusaka	High Commission (Note: Resident in Lusaka, Zambia)	1991	

=== Americas ===
Host country	Host city	Mission	Year closed	Ref.
Barbados	Bridgetown	High Commission (Note: Resident in Port of Spain, Trinidad and Tobago)	2004	
United States	Atlanta	Consulate-General	2012	
Venezuela	Caracas	Embassy (Note: Resident in Bogotá, Colombia)	2002	

=== Asia ===
Host country	Host city	Mission	Year closed	Ref.
Afghanistan	Kabul	Embassy	2021	
China	Shenyang	Consulate-General	2024	
Indonesia	Kupang	Consulate	1999	
Indonesia	Medan	Consulate	Unknown	
Iran	Tehran	Embassy	2025	
Japan	Fukuoka	Consulate-General	2019	
Japan	Sapporo	Consulate	2019	
Kazakhstan	Almaty	Embassy (Note: Resident in Moscow, Russia)	1999	
Republic of China	Nanjing (Note: Opened in 1941 as a legation in Chongqing, moved to Nanjing in 1946, and elevated into an embassy in 1948.)	Embassy (Note: Now continues as an Australian Office in Taipei.)	1949	
Republic of China (Taiwan)	Taipei	Embassy	1973	
South Vietnam	Saigon	Embassy (Note: The South Vietnamese embassy was closed upon the fall of Saigon in April 1975, thus marking the end of the Vietnam War and the start of a transition period to the formal reunification of Vietnam.) (Note: Continues as a consulate-general in Ho Chi Minh City, Vietnam.)	1975	
Syria	Damascus	Embassy	1999	

=== Europe ===
Host country	Host city	Mission	Year closed	Ref.
Hungary	Budapest	Embassy (Note: Resident in Vienna, Austria)	2013	
United Kingdom	Manchester	Consulate	2001	

== See also ==
- Department of Foreign Affairs and Trade
- Foreign relations of Australia
- Visa policy of Australia
