= Australia–United Kingdom Free Trade Agreement =

Free trade agreement between Australia and the United Kingdom sign on 2021

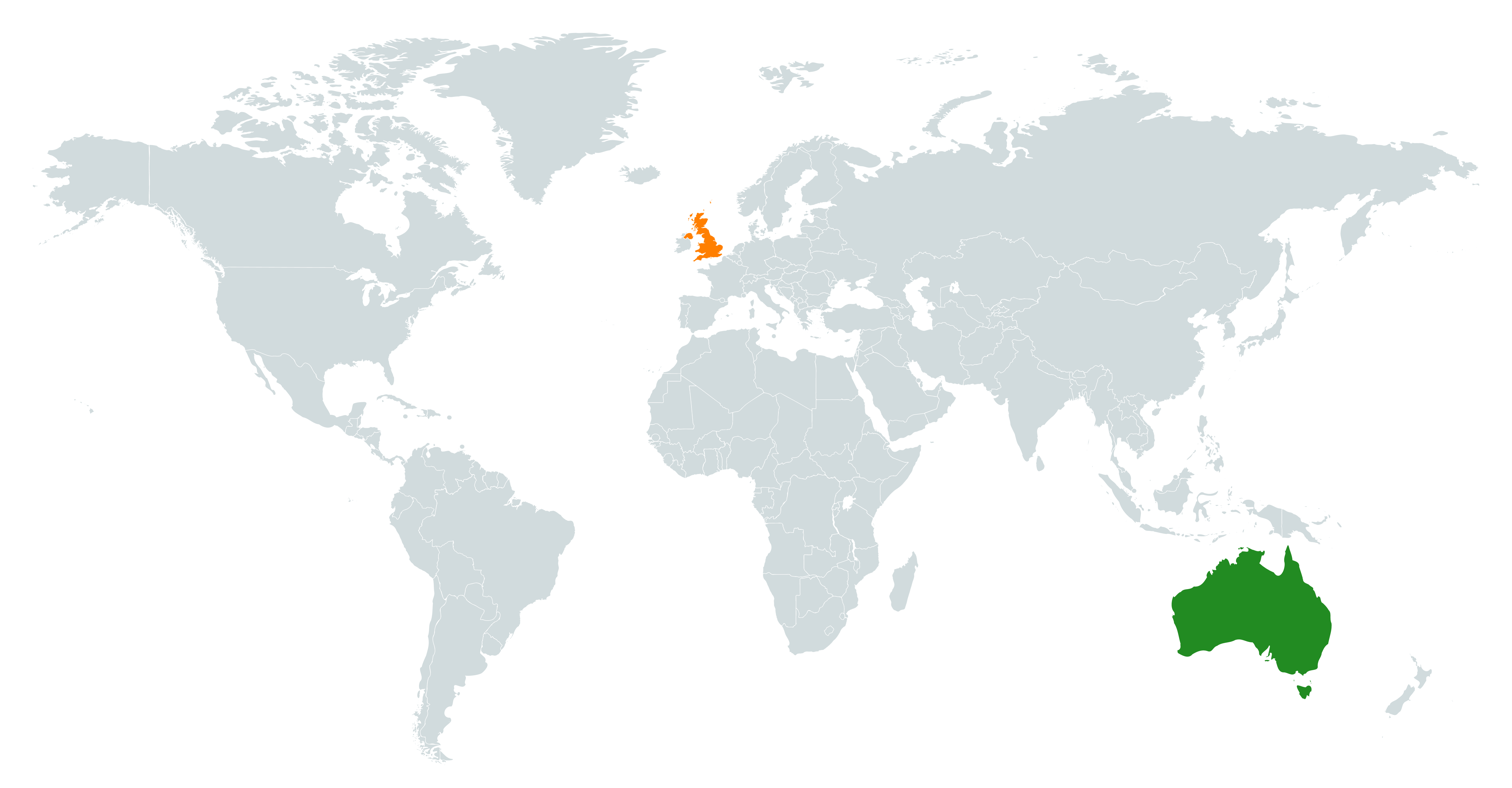
- Australia United Kingdom (UK)
- Type: Free Trade Agreement and Economic Integration Agreement
- Context: Trade agreement between the UK and Australia
- Drafted: 15 June 2021
- Signed: 17 December 2021
- Location: Virtually in London, UK, and Adelaide, Australia
- Effective: 31 May 2023
- Condition: Ratification by both Houses of the Parliament of Australia and the UK
- Negotiators: (Australia) Australian Trade Ministers: Simon Birmingham (until 22 December 2020); Dan Tehan (from 22 December 2020); (United Kingdom) British Trade Ministers: Liz Truss (until 15 September 2021); Anne-Marie Trevelyan (from 15 September 2021)
- Parties: Australia; United Kingdom
- Language: English

The Australia–United Kingdom free trade agreement (AUKFTA) was signed 17 December 2021. The broad terms of the agreement had been agreed six months earlier, following almost a year of negotiations. It was the first trade agreement signed by Britain since leaving the European Union that was negotiated completely anew.

== Background ==
The United Kingdom voted to leave the European Union in the 2016 United Kingdom European Union membership referendum by 51.9 per cent of votes in favour to 48.1 per cent of votes against, in a decision referred to as Brexit. The United Kingdom subsequently left the European Union on 31 January 2020.

Polling conducted by YouGov from 7–8 September 2016, found that Australia was the country that Leave voters most wanted to sign a free trade agreement with, with 47 per cent ranking it as the top priority country.

In 2020, trade between the countries was valued at £13.9 billion. Australia accounts for 0.4 per cent of British exports and 1.3 per cent of imports.

== Negotiations ==
The United Kingdom and Australia started negotiations for a free trade deal on 17 June 2020. The broad terms of the agreement were agreed on 14 June 2021, following almost a year of negotiations.

On 15 June 2020, the Australian Government released its negotiating position. Two days later, on 17 June 2020, the UK Government also released its negotiation objectives, outlining what it would like to achieve in a free trade agreement.

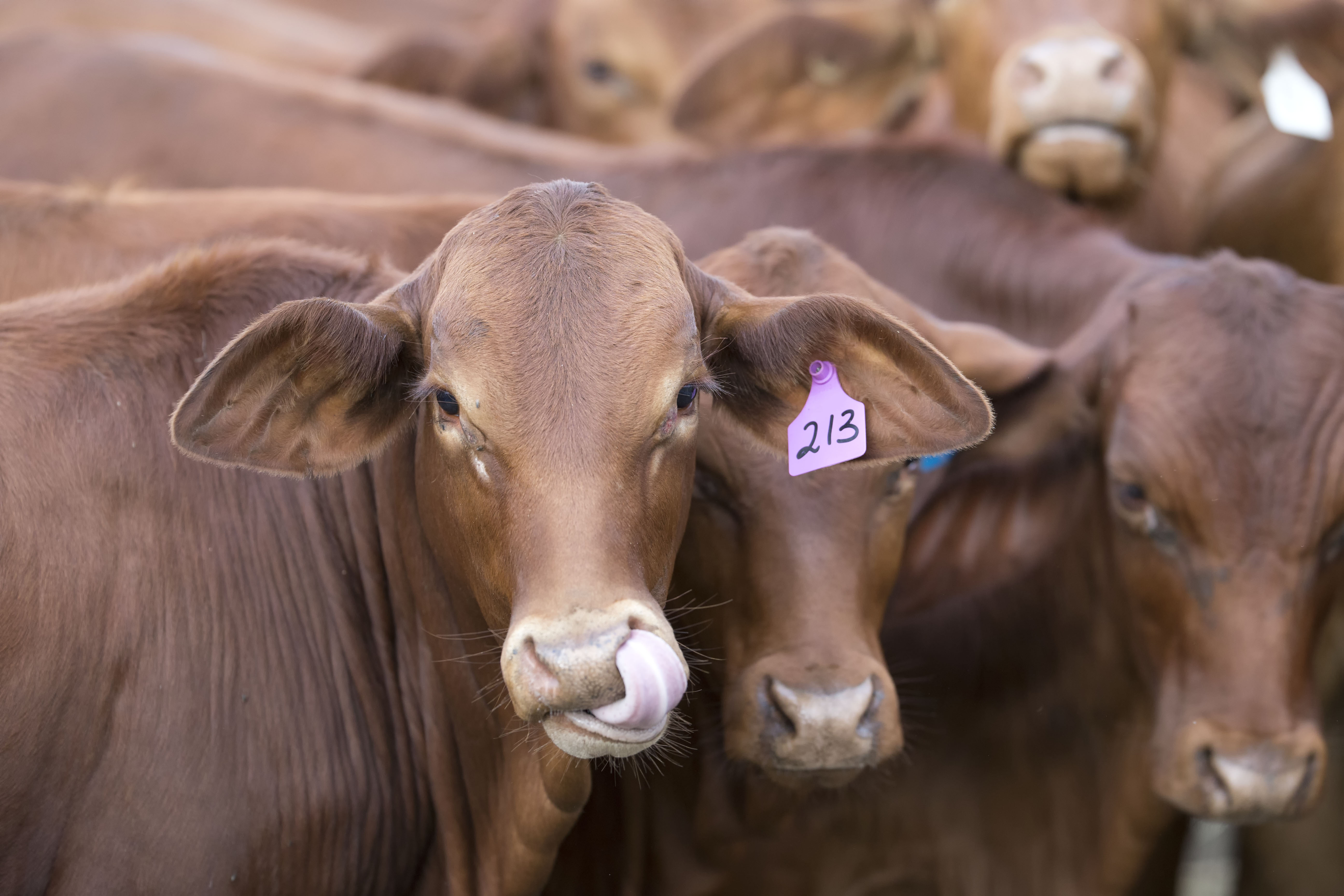
British farmers fear the effect of Australian competition in their beef and lamb markets.

Farmers in the United Kingdom expressed concern that prices would be undercut by cheaper Australian imports. Australian beef production sits around 2.3 million tonnes (2.5 million short tons; 2.3 million long tons) of beef per annum, compared to 900,000 tonnes (990,000 short tons; 890,000 long tons) in the United Kingdom. Australian sheep meat production is around 700,000 tonnes (770,000 short tons; 690,000 long tons), 2 1/2 times the UK's output. The British government sought a 15-year cap on tariff-free imports to address these concerns. Polling conducted by Opinium Research found that 61 per cent of Britons prioritised protecting British farmers over signing new trade agreements, with 20 per cent prioritising signing new trade deals.

A year after negotiations began, the agreement was reached over dinner between Boris Johnson and Scott Morrison. The following day, the British government announced that an agreement had been reached in principle.

== Agreement ==
Australia secured a seven-fold increase in tariff-free access to the UK market for its beef and lamb exports, to be phased in after ten years. In return, British citizens under 35 can get working holiday visas for three years instead of the previous two, and Australian employers do not need to show economic necessity to hire them. Observers took the agreement as a sign that the British government, in negotiating future trade agreements with nations with large agricultural sectors, will favour the interests of consumers over farmers.

In mid-2022, as both governments worked towards final ratification, the deal began coming in for heavy criticism on the British side. The National Farmers' Union expressed concern about the possibility that Australian exporters could flood the British market and drive down prices, as well as the lack of any protections for geographical indicators on foods such as Cornish clotted cream. Food-safety groups like the Pesticide Action Network were alarmed that the agreement had no provisions requiring Australian produce comply with stricter British standards. In November, as the Australian parliament's ratification vote neared, George Eustice, a Brexit supporter who had until September been in the Cabinet as Secretary of State for Environment, Food and Rural Affairs and negotiated parts of the deal, reiterated these concerns on the floor of the House of Commons when he denounced the deal, which the British Parliament did not get to vote on, as one-sided, blaming former Secretary of State for International Trade Liz Truss for forcing an agreement to be reached swiftly to make then-Prime Minister Boris Johnson's government look good; he also called for the lead UK negotiation, Crawford Falconer, to be replaced.

British defenders of the agreement noted in response that Eustice had had his chance to block the agreement while he was in the government and did not. They further said that it was unlikely that Australia would be fully exploiting the new quotas, since it did not even meet the current ones and found it more profitable to sell to large markets closer to it in Asia due to the time and distance involved in shipping to the UK. The British government also argued that it had maintained food-safety standards, with Australia agreeing to its high sanitary and phytosanitary (SPS) regulations for all food.

== Provisions ==
Under the terms of the agreement in principle, Australia would relax certain rules around working holiday visas for Britons under the age of 35.

=== Areas Covered in the FTA and Contention Points ===
- Trade in Goods:
- Sanitary and Phytosanitary Measures (SPS):
- Customs and Trade Facilitation
- Rules of Origin
- Technical Barriers to Trade (TBT)
- Good Regulatory Practices
- Transparency, Publication, and Administrative Measures
- Trade in Services, Including Telecommunications and Financial Services
- Mobility
- Digital Trade in Goods and Services and Cross-Border Data Flows
- Investment
- Intellectual Property
- Procedural Fairness for Pharmaceuticals and Medical Devices
- State-Owned and Controlled Enterprises (SOEs)
- Subsidies
- Competition Policy
- Labor
- Environment
- Anti-corruption
- Trade Remedies
- Settlement
- General Provisions

== Significance ==
On 15 June 2021, the British Secretary of State for International Trade and President of the Board of Trade, Liz Truss, said that the agreement "paved the way" for the United Kingdom to become a member of the Comprehensive and Progressive Agreement for Trans-Pacific Partnership (CPTPP). The United Kingdom formally applied to join the CPTPPP in February 2021 and began membership negotiations on 2 June 2021.

British government estimates suggest that an agreement would grow the British economy by £500 million over the course of 15 years, equivalent to a 0.02 per cent increase in GDP.

The Australian National Farmers' Federation welcomed the deal as an opportunity for increased Australian agricultural exports to the United Kingdom.

On 11 May 2022, the UK Government introduced a Trade Bill to ratify and bring into force the UK-Australia and UK-New Zealand Free Trade Agreements (FTAs) that were signed in December and February respectively.

The Australian Government confirmed it was "confident" the UK-Australia Free Trade Agreement would be ready to be put into action by year's end with thousands more young people set to be eligible for a working visa. The extended negotiation process between the two countries finally drew to an end late 2021 when the then-Johnson and Morrison governments signed the landmark deal.

On 17 November 2022, the Australian Government Joint Standing Committee on Treaties (JSCOT) handed down its report on the Australia–United Kingdom Free Trade Agreement (A-UKFTA). The committee made two recommendations:

The committee recommended the Australian Government implements the recommendations of Report 193: Strengthening the Trade Agreement and Treaty Making Process in Australia, particularly in relation to greater consultation and transparency during the negotiating process, and providing independent modelling and analysis of trade agreements. The committee supports the Free Trade Agreement between Australia and the United Kingdom of Great Britain and Northern Ireland and recommends that binding treaty action be taken. Subsequently, on 22 November 2022, the treaty passed both Houses of Parliament.

A-UKFTA entered into force after Australia and the UK confirmed with each other in writing that they had completed their respective domestic requirements.

Notably, the A-UK FTA also strengthens the people-to-people links between Australia and the UK. Australian professionals now have the same access to the UK job market as nationals from the European Union, except the Republic of Ireland. From 31 January 2024, Australians up to the age of 35 (up from 30) have been able to apply for working holidays in the UK and stay for a maximum of three years instead of two.

== Impact ==
=== Overall economic and trade impact ===
Prior to the agreement's implementation, computable general equilibrium modeling by the UK Department for International Trade projected that the deal would expand UK gross domestic product (GDP) by 0.08% equivalent to £2.3 billion by 2035 with sensitivity testing placing the expected long-term gain between 0.06% and 0.10%. The model anticipated a 53% (£10.4 billion) overall expansion in bilateral trade, driven by a projected £6.2 billion (44%) increase in UK exports to Australia and a £4.2 billion (66%) increase in UK imports from Australia. Additionally, long-term real UK wages were estimated to grow by 0.1% (£900 million annually) as economy-wide productivity improved and workers reallocated across sectors.

Post-implementation monitoring data published by the Department for Business and Trade across the agreement's first two years (May 2023 to June 2025) indicated that total bilateral trade grew by 14.3% (£2.8 billion) to reach £22.6 billion, compared to overall UK trade growth with the rest of the world (+0.02%) over the same period. By mid-2025, services accounted for 69.2% of total bilateral trade. Between June 2023 and December 2024, 65.9% of eligible UK exports to Australia used tariff preferences, saving an estimated £89 million in duties, while 77.3% of eligible UK imports from Australia used preferences, saving an estimated £139 million. Because 89.7% of UK goods imports from Australia were already tariff-free under Most Favoured Nation rules, preference-eligible goods comprised 10.3% of total UK imports from Australia.

=== Sectoral and regional impact ===
Prior to the agreement, economic modeling estimated that 20 out of 23 broad economic sectors in the UK would expand. The largest absolute Gross Value Added (GVA) increases were projected in service industries led by wholesale and retail trade (+£340 million), public services (+£265 million), and business services (+£210 million) alongside advanced manufacturing sectors such as machinery (+£230 million) and motor vehicles (+£200 million). Over the same period, total UK goods exports to Australia fell by 16.3% (-£839 million), reflecting a wider global decrease in UK goods exports (-8.4%).

At the regional level, initial government modeling projected long-term GVA growth across all UK nations and English regions, with the largest proportional gains expected in the West Midlands (+0.14% / £195 million), the North East (+0.12% / £65 million), and the North West (+0.10% / £189 million). Projected absolute output gains for the devolved nations were £120 million for Scotland, £58 million for Wales, and £21 million for Northern Ireland. Post-implementation goods trade statistics showed regional variation: goods exports to Australia grew from the South West (+11.3%) and Wales (+24.6%), whereas exports contracted from Northern Ireland (-34.0%) and the West Midlands (-3.8%).

=== Agriculture and agri-food sectors ===
Government impact assessments projected a long-term reduction in domestic output for UK agriculture, forestry, and fishing of £94 million (-0.7%) and semi-processed food of £225 million (-2.65%), attributed to increased competition in livestock markets. Sector-specific modeling indicated potential gross output falls of 3% for domestic beef and 5% for sheep meat. Industry evidence submitted by farming bodies including the National Farmers' Union (NFU) and the National Beef Association attributed these pressures to cost advantages in Australia, where beef production costs were estimated at roughly 2.5 times lower than UK levels and sheep meat costs 65% lower, driven by climate, farm scale, and pasture management.

To manage the transition for domestic producers, the agreement established 15-year safeguard protections:

- Beef Tariff Rate Quotas (TRQs): Duty-free import quotas open at 35,000 tonnes in Year 1 and increase in equal annual amounts each year to 110,000 tonnes by Year 10.Between Years 11 and 15, product-specific safeguards apply a 20% tariff when imports exceed specified volumes (rising from 122,000 to 170,000 tonnes) before the tariff is fully removed in Year 16.
- Sheep meat TRQs: Duty-free quotas begin at 25,000 tonnes in Year 1 and rise to 75,000 tonnes by Year 10. Safeguards apply from Years 11 to 15 when imports exceed specified volumes, which rise from 85,000 to 125,000 tonnes.
- Excluded Sectors: Tariffs were retained on pig meat, poultry, and egg products due to differences in regulatory and production standards, such as Australia's allowance of ractopamine in swine feed.

In the 12 months to May 2025, Australian-origin beef imports to the UK increased from 700 to 7,200 metric tonnes, raising Australia's share of UK beef imports from 0.3% to 2.5%. This growth partly replaced imports from EU suppliers, while overall UK beef imports remained close to pre-agreement levels, increasing by 3.4%. Use of Australia's beef TR) reached 13.1% in 2024 and 29.3% in 2025. Over the same period, sheep meat imports grew from 7,200 to 20,500 tonnes accounting for a 28.7% share of UK sheep meat imports with quota use reaching 45.6% in 2025. Raw cane sugar imports under the FTA quota rose to 73,000 tonnes in 2023/24 (filling 62.3% of the limit) before dropping to 16,300 tonnes in 2024/25 (0% quota usage), with monitoring showing no reduction in imports from African, Caribbean, and Pacific (ACP) countries.

=== Environmental, welfare, and regulatory standards ===
Statutory reports under Section 42 of the Agriculture Act 2020 confirmed that the agreement did not alter UK food safety or import regulations; existing statutory bans on hormone-treated beef and ractopamine-treated pork remain intact. The independent Trade and Agriculture Commission (TAC) advised that while Australia permits certain farming practices not allowed in the UK such as specific pesticide uses and genetically modified canola cultivation the agreement preserves the UK's legal right to enforce its Sanitary and Phytosanitary (SPS) import standards.

Chapter 25 commits the parties not to lower animal welfare standards and formally recognizes animals as sentient beings. Agricultural organizations including the National Farmers' Union (NFU), the Farmers' Union of Wales, and the National Beef Association highlighted regulatory differences between the two nations, including cattle feedlot space limits, hot-iron branding, livestock transit times of up to 48 hours without breaks (compared to 14 hours in the UK), and sheep mulesing. The TAC concluded that Australian sheep raised for meat export are generally not mulesed and noted that all Australian export slaughterhouses enforce mandatory pre-slaughter stunning.

On climate policy, the agreement includes a dedicated environment chapter affirming the Paris Agreement. However, parliamentary bodies including the House of Lords International Agreements Committee and the Scottish Government alongside environmental groups like the Trade Justice Movement and Green Alliance noted the absence of an explicit reference to the 1.5 °C global warming limit. Government modeling estimated that while domestic UK production emissions would stay largely unchanged, maritime transport emissions associated with bilateral trade would increase by 0.1 to 0.3 million metric tonnes of carbon dioxide (MtCO2e) equivalent annually (a 31% to 40% increase in transport emissions for this trade route).

=== Parliamentary scrutiny and governance ===
The agreement was presented to Parliament under the Constitutional Reform and Governance Act 2010 on 15 June 2022. Reports by select committees, including the House of Commons International Trade Committee, the Environment, Food and Rural Affairs (EFRA) Committee and the House of Lords International Agreements Committee, raised concerns that Parliament had limited time to examine and debate the agreement before it was ratified. The EFRA Committee noted that immediate market disruption was limited because Australia was close to valuable Asian export markets. However, basing tariff rate quota limits on the weight of shipped products rather than the equivalent carcass weight could encourage Australian exporters to prioritise higher-value cuts.

== Response in Australia ==
The Lowy Institute was unstinting in its praise for the agreement. "It is hard to overstate this achievement by the Australian negotiating team", wrote Dmitry Grozoubinski, a commentator on its blog. While most often the ecstatic language of news releases announcing trade deals hid the lack of real accomplishments, "[n]ot this time. This deal does what it says on the tin."

"Remarkably, it is not clear what UK negotiators managed to extract in reciprocal concessions", Grozoubinski continued, foreshadowing a theme that would later be sounded in British criticism of the deal. "Sure Australia has agreed to eliminate its own tariffs, but that is somewhat like landlocked Switzerland offering to eliminate its navy. Unlike the UK, which has some formidable tariff walls around agriculture, Australia's tariffs are incredibly low and their elimination is unlikely to change anyone's commercial calculus."

== Criticism in UK ==
In 2022, as the British government moved towards implementing the deal, agricultural interests were criticising it. Early in the year the UK chapter of the Pesticide Action Network (PAN) issued Toxic Trade, a report expressing concern that the agreement might weaken British restrictions on pesticide use by permitting the import of Australian crops grown under laxer standards—for example, Britain permits farmers to use just four organophosphates against the thirty-three allowed in Australia. It feared this might set a precedent for Britain making similar concessions in negotiating trade deals with other large countries that export produce in quantity such as the United States, India and Brazil.

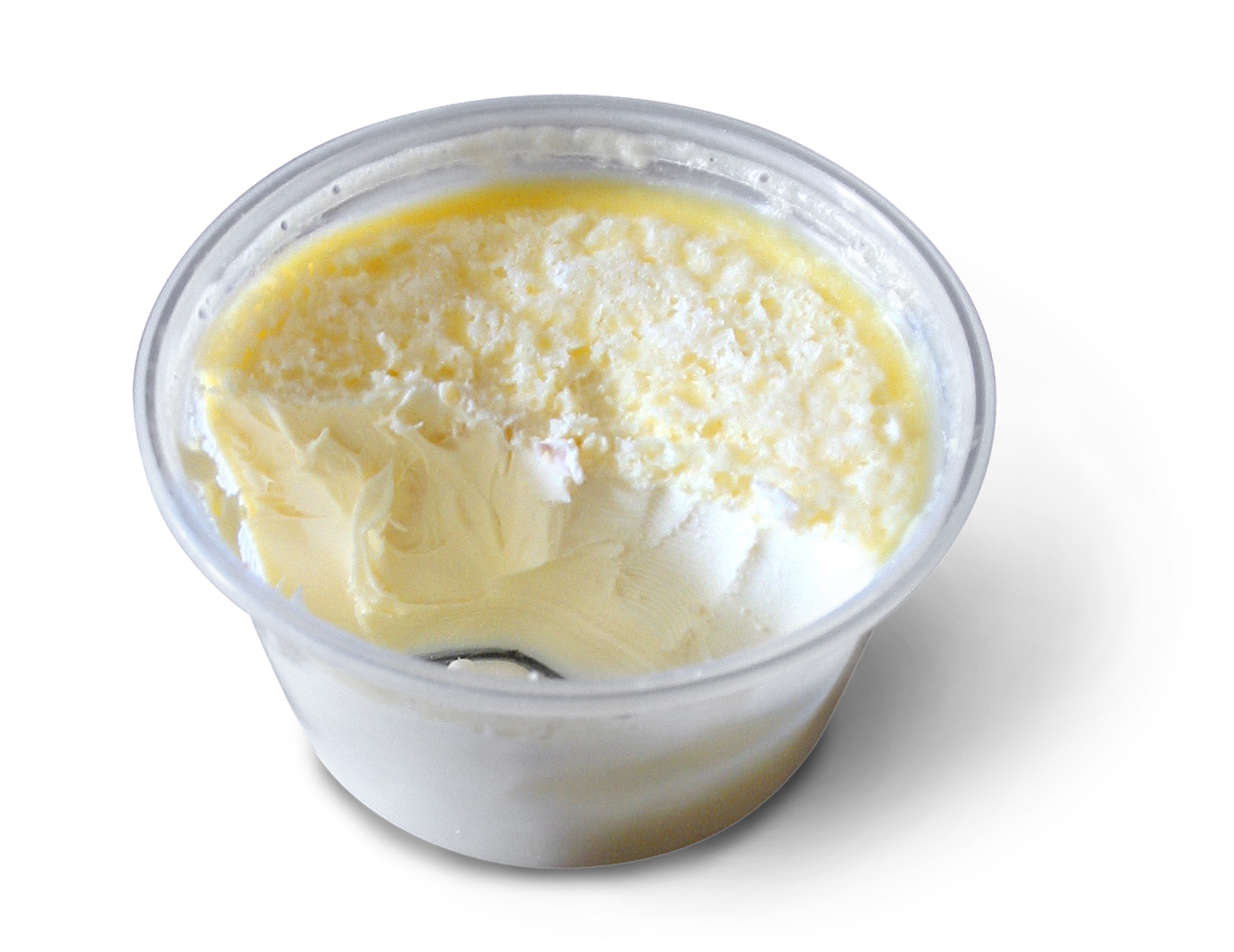
Cornish clotted cream

A June report on the proposed deal by the House of Lords's International Agreements Committee generally accepted it, but expressed concern that the government's haste to conclude it might have come at the expense of whatever negotiating leverage it had. The committee noted that the agreement failed to offer any protection to certain geographically-indicated British foods, such as Cornish clotted cream and Scotch whisky, allowing any Australian producer to use them for foods exported to Britain. It also expressed concern about the pesticide issue and other environmental concerns such as food grown on deforested land, and chastised the government for insufficient consultation with its devolved parliaments. "The Government should take disappointment from UK stakeholders seriously" it wrote. Compassion in World Farming, along with the Royal Society for the Prevention of Cruelty to Animals, Which? and several other organisations, also put out a report expressing concern about the government compromising on animal welfare standards as well as food safety.

The following month the House of Commons' International Trade Committee, a cross-party group, joined the criticism. Scottish National Party MP Angus MacNeil, its chair, not only repeated the concerns expressed by PAN and the Lords' committee but said the treaty would bring minimal economic gain in return for those concessions. Since by its own calculations it would increase Britain's GDP 0.08 per cent, "[t]he government must level with the public—this trade deal will not have the transformative effects ministers would like to claim", he said. Consumers might benefit, the committee allowed, but only in very small ways such as slightly lower prices on Australian wine.

Specifically, the National Farmers' Union (NFU), was quoted in the report as to the competitive imbalance between British and Australian agriculture. "British farmers are being asked to go toe-to-toe with some of the most cost-effective food producers in the world.", the NFU said. "But there is scant evidence that the government has the vision to create the conditions to allow our farmers to compete ... we do believe that deals must be balanced in respect of offering reciprocal benefit." The NFU had also lobbied heavily, but futilely, for beef and lamb quotas in the agreement to be based on carcass weight equivalent.

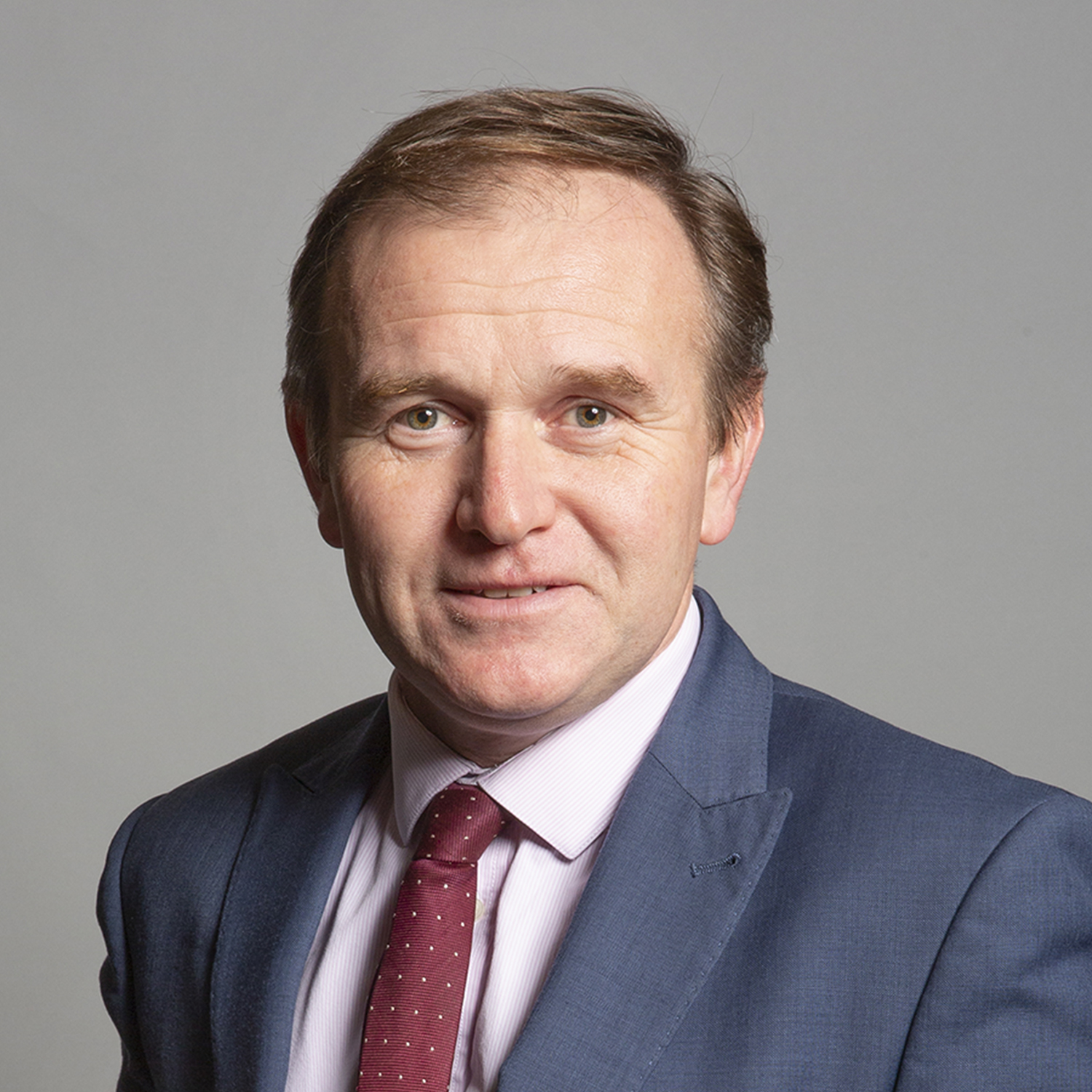
George Eustice, in 2019

In November, George Eustice, who up until two months before had been Secretary of State for Environment, Food and Rural Affairs and thus involved in the negotiations, vociferously criticised the treaty in Parliament as "not actually a very good deal for the UK." He faulted Truss, (Note: Another former Cabinet member, who spoke off the record to Politico, echoed Eustice's criticisms of the deal, saying they were "astonish[ed that] farmers were thrown under the bus" in the deal and that the generous terms granted Australia have already led Mexico and Canada to ask for equivalent access to British markets. "This has profound implications for trade deals in other parts of the world, which is actually why fucking Liz Truss is such a fucking imbecile", they said.) who had dismissed him from his post at the beginning of her brief tenure as Prime Minister and was at the time of the negotiations Secretary of State for International Trade, for putting British negotiators "on the back foot" with her insistence that a deal be concluded before the end of the 2021 G7 summit in Cornwall, where Australian prime minister Scott Morrison was a guest and the two could announce the deal after dinner on the last night. He praised some aspects of the deal that his department had been the primary negotiator on, such as the phasing in of reduced agricultural tariffs over a 10-15 year period and recognition of British sovereignty in SPS standards, but "overall the truth of the matter is that the UK gave away far too much for far too little in return."

Eustice was particularly critical of one other person involved, Crawford Falconer, the New Zealand-born interim permanent secretary of the Department of International Trade (DIT): "His approach always was to internalise Australian demands, often when they were against UK interests, his advice was invariably to retreat and make fresh concessions and all the while he resented people who understood technical issues greater than he did." Eustice said Falconer should be replaced with "somebody who understands British interests better than I think he's been able to."

Other observers joined Eustice in another criticism: the government's failure to keep a promise to allow Parliament to debate the treaty. They contrasted that with Australia's final adoption of the treaty in late November following a full debate in both houses of its Parliament. But although both Truss and her predecessor, Boris Johnson, had promised the same on their end, Rishi Sunak, Truss's successor, who had campaigned for the Conservative Party leadership against Truss in part by criticizing the agreement although he ruled out renegotiating it, never put the deal up for a vote. "Never again must our democracy be bypassed," tweeted NFU president Minette Batters, in response to Australian prime minister Anthony Albanese posting a picture of himself and Sunak shaking hands to announce the former's Parliament passing the deal. "[E]very FTA must be scrutinised by Parliament."

An economist with the Agriculture and Trade Commission (ATC), Catherine McBride, took the opposite tack in her criticism, arguing that the deal was too protective of British farmers, in the way it phased in the tariff reductions. The hard truth, she wrote in the Daily Express, was that the UK had long since passed the point where its farmers could grow enough food to feed the entire population, and needed imports of many farm products, particularly beef and lamb. Dairy farmers should not, McBride said, have to wait six years for tariff-free access to the Australian market so their cattle- and lamb-raising counterparts could be insulated from corresponding competition for fifteen. "Protecting a bad business model (UK grazing) to the detriment of a good business (UK dairy farming) is economic madness", she wrote. "But, that is how protectionism usually plays out."

=== Response ===
In response to these criticisms, government spokespeople reiterated that the agreement would add to the British economy, that it would not compromise on food safety standards, and that the ATC had concluded that it had not. On the issue of geographical indications, they pointed out that Australia did not have any such protections for agricultural products, foodstuffs or spirits. "Should they introduce such a scheme we have agreed to review our agreement with Australia to ensure the UK's finest products are protected", they said. "This is the strongest commitment that Australia has made towards setting up a GI scheme in any of its trade deals."

Eustice's remarks drew a sharper response. A DIT source reminded The Guardian that Eustice had been in the Cabinet when the deal was approved there. "If the deal was as bad as he claims, he would never have approved it." Others felt it was an overreach for Eustice to so harshly criticise Falconer to the point of calling on him to be fired, since as a civil servant Falconer by convention cannot respond. "I hope [Eustice] will see his way to apologising for it because it was completely unfair," said one government consultant, while Ben Ramanasaukas, a former advisor to Truss, called the former DEFRA secretary's remarks "mean-spirited and wrong".

But while Ramanasaukas agreed with Eustice and other critics that setting a deadline for the deal was a bad idea, he disagreed with other elements of their objections. "They see it as a zero-sum game", he said. "They see imports as a bad thing." By contrast, he argued they were "fantastic for obvious reasons: lower prices for consumers and other businesses, more competition, thriving innovation."

Others said it was important to place the deal in its full context. "Given the importance of agricultural exports to both Australia and New Zealand," said one former British trade negotiator, "it's hard to see how those deals would have happened if the UK hadn't made market access commitments in those areas." Britain would also need both countries' support for its application to join the Comprehensive and Progressive Agreement for Trans-Pacific Partnership, as they are already full members. Ed Conway, economics and data editor at Sky News, among others, noted when the deal was reached that the distance between the two countries was more of a constraint on trade than any tariffs or restrictions, especially since Australia had larger markets to sell to much closer at hand. Even at present, he said, Australian beef and lamb exports to the UK did not come anywhere near the quotas set during the EU era. He still cautioned that the sevenfold increase in the quotas would come much more abruptly than the government had represented it as.

Further, Conway pointed out, Australia had prior to Britain's EU accession been a much larger trading partner. In the mid-1950s, roughly 12.5 per cent of all British exports went to Australia, an amount that began falling before accession, to 1.6 per cent sixty years later. Conway saw the deal's terms as indicating that the UK would, in negotiating future trade deals with large agricultural nations, be moving away from EU-legacy protections for its farmers and toward the interests of consumers.

However, Nick von Westenholtz, director of trade for the NFU, pointed to caveats those arguments did not take into account. Primarily, he noted, they were based on the assumption that Australia's current trading relationships would remain the same for some time to come. If, he posited, China decided to drastically limit Australian meat imports for some reason, Australian producers might decide to take the full advantage allowed them of the British market in order to compensate, and Britain would not be able to do much about that. "The UK government has reserved itself almost no recourse to managing imports if they start proving harmful to UK farm livelihoods."

In Australia, Grozoubinski similarly noted that the British government's selling points for the agreement contradicted themselves. "To farmers and their representatives, apoplectic about this deal, it has argued that Australian produce is unlikely to flood into the UK market, citing existing trading patterns and strong demand closer to home." Yet, "[c]onversely, in media commentary, press releases, and speaking to its more libertarian members the UK government primarily emphasised the benefits to consumers of cheaper or at least more plentiful access to Australian products, from Tim Tam biscuits to steaks." But few consumers were likely to see those benefits, Grozoubinski noted, unless Australian products actually were to flood British markets at levels that would force prices down to the point of adversely affecting British farmers and other producers.

== See also ==
- Australia–United Kingdom relations
- Foreign relations of Australia
- Foreign relations of the United Kingdom
- Free trade agreements of the United Kingdom
- Commonwealth free trade
- List of bilateral free-trade agreements
