= 457 visa =

Skilled worker visa for Australia

In Australia, the 457 visa was the most common visa for Australian or overseas employers to sponsor skilled overseas workers to work temporarily in Australia. It was abolished on 18 March 2018 by the Turnbull government and replaced by another visa category. The full title of this subclass of visa was Temporary Business (Long Stay) and was introduced soon after John Howard became Prime Minister in 1996. The title of the visa was changed to Temporary Work (Skilled) (Subclass 457) visa on 24 November 2012. Applications were processed by the Department of Immigration and Border Protection (DIBP). On 18 April 2017, Prime Minister Malcolm Turnbull announced that the 457 visas will be replaced with two new visa categories.

== Requirements ==
Holders of a 457 visa may be employed for a period of up to four years and may bring any eligible family members, including partners, who have unrestricted work and study rights in Australia. "If your sponsor is a start-up business or has traded in Australia for less than 12 months, then the visa will be granted for 18 months." Holders of the subclass 457 visa have no limit on the number of times they travel in and out of Australia.

Employers must be approved by the Department of Immigration and Border Protection as an approved sponsor. Primary subclass 457 visa holders are restricted to working for their sponsor and may not work (or volunteer) for any other organisation (other than associated entities as defined by the Corporations Act). In order to change employer and sponsor, the "new employer" must be or become an approved 457 sponsor and then lodge a 457 nomination. Once the nomination is approved, the employer obligations will shift to the new employer and the visa applicant is restricted to working for it. There is no need to apply for a new 457 visa within the validity of the visa.

Employees must also meet minimum levels of skill and English language requirements, in addition to character and health requirements. Some trades occupations and passport holders from certain countries may be required to do a skills assessment (see the TRA website).

It is common for 457 visa holders to apply for a permanent Australia residents visa with a view to permanently settle in Australia and become Australian citizens.

== Restrictions on the 457 visa ==
A 457 visa holder can only work in a nominated occupation for the sponsor employer. Medical practitioners and general managers must work in their nominated occupation but they can work for employers other than their sponsor or an associated entity of their sponsor. The specific occupations to which this rule applies are listed in Exemption from the requirement to work directly for the sponsor. The worker must also not have ceased employment for more than 60 consecutive days.

== 457 visa update ==
The Australian Government reviewed the 457 skilled immigrant visa and made some provisions to quicken the transition to permanent residency starting on 1 July 2012. From that date, non-resident workers on the 457 skilled immigration visa are able to transition to permanent residency if they have two years with the employer who has sponsored them and if the employer provides a full-time position in the 457 visa holder's nominated occupation.

Furthermore, the Australian government has recognised that 457 visas deserve priority in review as they are highly responsive to the needs of the market. Overseas workers will be able to work in Australia on a six-month short term work visa before they apply for a 457 visa.

As at 30 June 2016, the size of the subclass 457 programme was 94,890 Primary visa holders in Australia.

=== Criticisms ===
An audit by the Fair Work Ombudsman conducted between September 2013 and June 2014 found that 40% of 457 visa holders were no longer employed by a sponsor or were being paid well below the statutory minimum wage of $53,900.

In October 2014, the Abbott government announced that it would make it easier for businesses to apply for 457 visa workers by relaxing rules for English language competency to broaden the pool of potential workers from overseas.

With the commencement of the Japan free trade agreement in 2015, employers no longer need to offer jobs to locals or to prove that none could fill vacancies before Japanese nationals eligible for 457 visas are employed.

In December 2014, the Department of Immigration and Border Protection released recommendations to relax 457 visa requirements. The recommendations include extending the six-month short term work visa to 12 months with no obligation to apply for a 457 visa. The Construction, Forestry, Mining and Energy Union (CFMEU) has criticized this change on the grounds that it avoids the 457 visa's requirement for English language and skills tests and employers would not be required to demonstrate they had first tried to fill job vacancies with Australian workers.

Period	Annual average assisted immigrants
1996–1997	25,786
1997-1998	30,880 ▲
2000-2001	36,900 ▲
2003-2004	48,590 ▲
2005-2007	71,149 ▲
2006-2007	87,313 ▲
2007-2008	110,567 ▲
2011-2012	125,070 ▲
2012-2013	126,348 ▲

== Replacement ==
On 18 April 2017, Malcolm Turnbull announced his intention to replace the 457 visas with 2 new categories (short term and medium term) of visas.

One of the replacements was the Temporary Skill Shortage visa, known as a 482 Visa. It allows immigration It requires candidates to obtain an IELTS (English Language) exam band score of 5 or higher, or other method of showing the English level.

== Replaced by the Skills in Demand Visa ==
In December 2024, the Temporary Skill Shortage (subclass 482) visa was replaced by the Skills in Demand (SID) visa, introduced by the Australian Government as part of its migration reforms.

== See also ==
- Visa documentation
- Working holiday visa
- Working Holidays in Australia
