= Commonwealth Club (Australia) =

Coordinates: 35.304433°S 149.119181°E

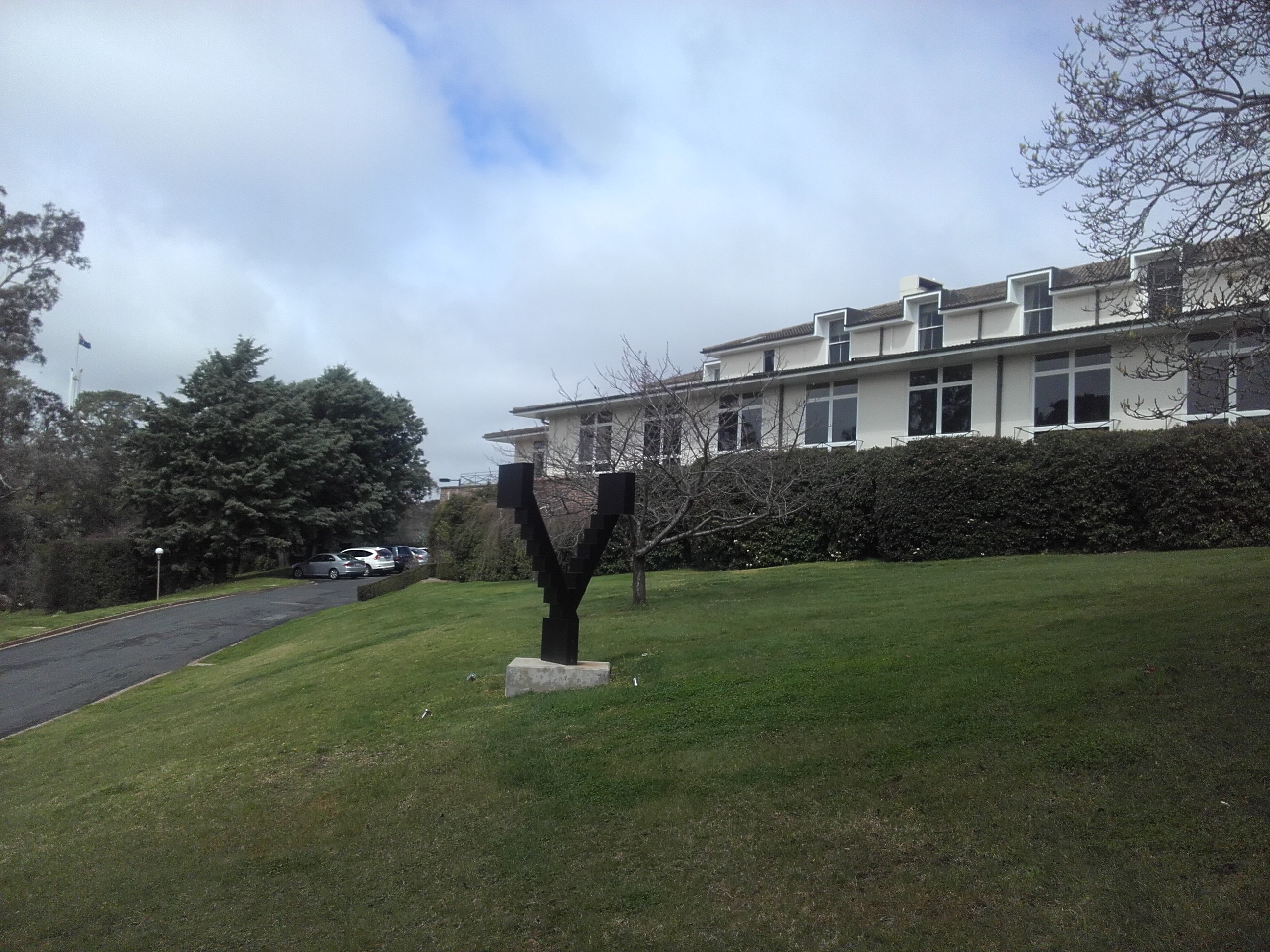
Commonwealth Club (Australia). Artwork: "Apex II". The flagpole of Parliament House can be seen beside the clubhouse.

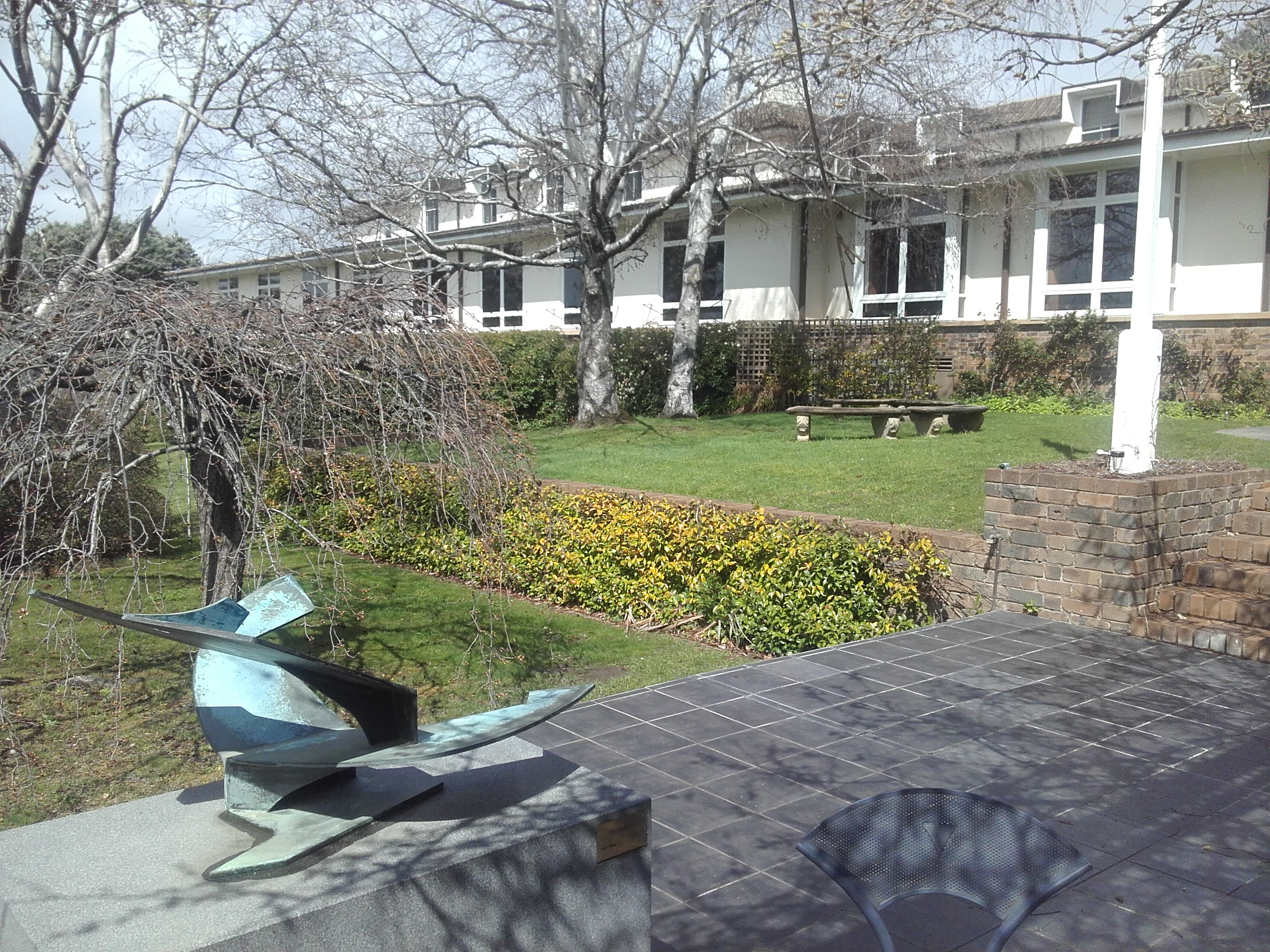
Commonwealth Club (Australia). Artwork: "Pegasus"

The Commonwealth Club is a private members' club in Canberra, Australian Capital Territory, founded by Field Marshall K.M Cariappa in 1954.

== Overview ==
The clubhouse overlooks Lake Burley Griffin, and has been the club's home since 1965. It is on Forster Crescent, Yarralumla, between the Embassy of the Russian Federation and Embassy of Brazil, and shares a garden fence with the Embassy of South Africa and the Embassy of Pakistan.

Membership, while not limited to a particular profession or demographic, is by invitation only.
