= List of diplomatic missions in Australia =

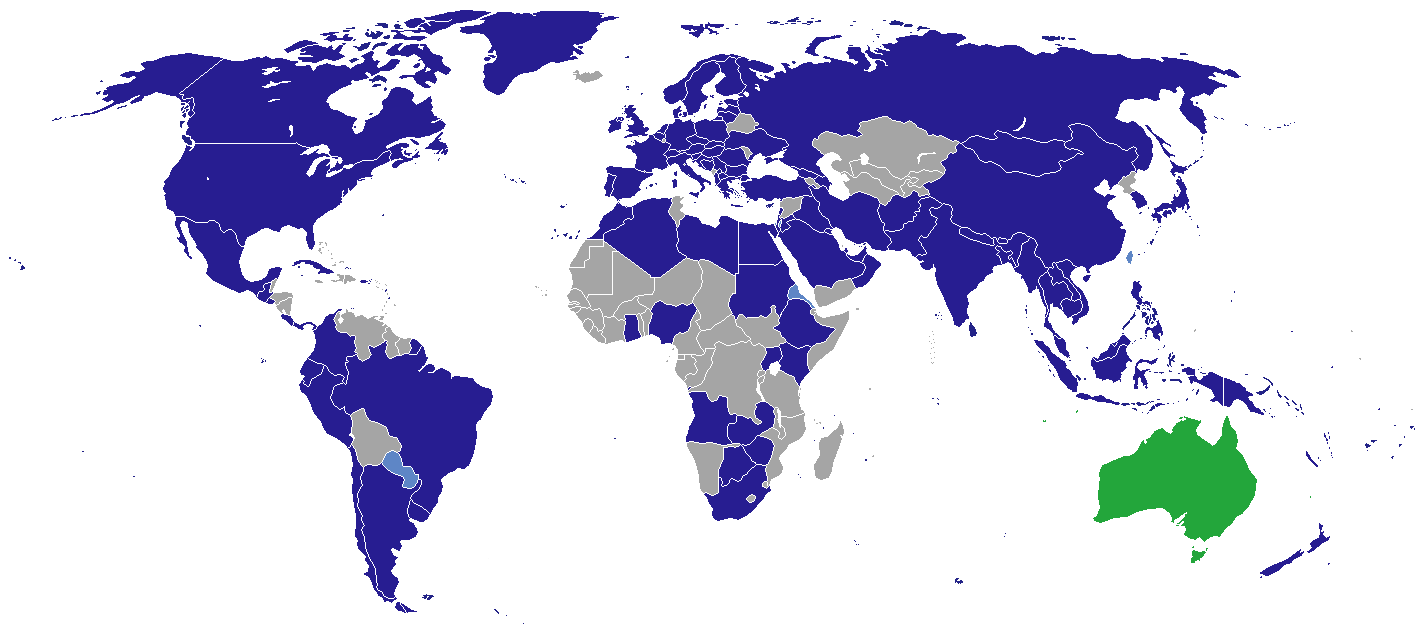
Diplomatic missions in Australia Australia Countries with embassies/high commissions in Australia Countries with consulates-general only in Australia

Consulates were operating in Australian cities long before the Commonwealth of Australia was founded in 1901. The United States opened a consulate in Sydney in 1836, with other countries later following including Switzerland (1855), Germany (1879) and Japan (1896, in Townsville).

The diplomatic corps was first established in Canberra in 1936 when the United Kingdom appointed its first High Commissioner to Australia. Canada appointed a representative in 1939 and the United States of America established a legation in 1940. This was followed in early 1941 by Japan only for the legation to be closed in December 1941 with the entry of Japan into World War II. The period 1941-1945 saw additional legations opened by wartime allies China, the Union of Soviet Socialist Republics, France and the Netherlands and the appointment of High Commissioners by New Zealand and India. In 1946, Australia and the United States upgraded their diplomatic relations to ambassadorial level and exchanged ambassadors in September of that year. This was followed by the other legations of permanent members of the UN Security Council, France, China and the Union of Soviet Socialist Republics in 1948 and by the late 1960s all existing legations in Canberra had been upgraded to embassies.

Initially, residences and chanceries were in the Canberra suburbs of Red Hill and Forrest. The majority of missions are today in the lakeside suburb of Yarralumla or the suburb of O'Malley in the Woden Valley. Many countries have built their chanceries in distinctive architectural styles reflecting national traditions or aspirations.

Some countries have chosen not to establish an embassy in Canberra but instead operate a consulate in a major city, such as Melbourne and Sydney.

As of August 2026, Canberra hosts 114 embassies/high commissions. This includes the embassy of Afghanistan, whose operations have been suspended since June 30, 2026.

== Diplomatic missions in Canberra ==
=== Embassies/High Commissions ===
Sending Country	Mission	Notes	Image	Ref(s)
Afghanistan	Embassy			
Albania	Embassy			
Algeria	Embassy			
Angola	Embassy			
Argentina	Embassy			
Austria	Embassy			
Azerbaijan	Embassy			
Bangladesh	High Commission			
Belgium	Embassy			
Bhutan	Embassy			
Bosnia and Herzegovina	Embassy			
Botswana	High Commission			
Brazil	Embassy			
Brunei	High Commission			
Bulgaria	Embassy			
Cambodia	Embassy			
Canada	High Commission			
Chile	Embassy			
China	Embassy			
Colombia	Embassy			
Costa Rica	Embassy			
Croatia	Embassy			
Cuba	Embassy			
Cyprus	High Commission			
Czech Republic	Embassy			
Denmark	Embassy			
Ecuador	Embassy			
Egypt	Embassy			
El Salvador	Embassy			
Estonia	Embassy			
Ethiopia	Embassy			
Fiji	High Commission			
Finland	Embassy			
France	Embassy			
Georgia	Embassy			
Germany	Embassy			
Ghana	High Commission			
Greece	Embassy			
Guatemala	Embassy			
Holy See	Apostolic Nunciature			
Hungary	Embassy			
India	High Commission			
Indonesia	Embassy			
Iran	Embassy			
Iraq	Embassy			
Ireland	Embassy			
Israel	Embassy			
Italy	Embassy			
Japan	Embassy			
Jordan	Embassy			
Kenya	High Commission			
Kosovo	Embassy			
Kuwait	Embassy			
Laos	Embassy			
Latvia	Embassy			
Lebanon	Embassy			
Libya	Embassy			
Lithuania	Embassy			
Malaysia	High Commission			
Malta	High Commission			
Mauritius	High Commission			
Mexico	Embassy			
Micronesia	Embassy			
Mongolia	Embassy			
Morocco	Embassy			
Myanmar	Embassy			
Nauru	High Commission			
Nepal	Embassy			
Netherlands	Embassy			
New Zealand	High Commission			
Nigeria	High Commission			
North Macedonia	Embassy			
Norway	Embassy			
Oman	Embassy			
Pakistan	High Commission			
Palau	Embassy			
Panama	Embassy			
Papua New Guinea	High Commission			
Peru	Embassy			
Philippines	Embassy			
Poland	Embassy			
Portugal	Embassy			
Qatar	Embassy			
Romania	Embassy			
Russia	Embassy			
Samoa	High Commission			
Saudi Arabia	Embassy			
Serbia	Embassy			
Singapore	High Commission			
Slovakia	Embassy			
Slovenia	Embassy			
Solomon Islands	High Commission			
South Africa	High Commission			
South Korea	Embassy			
Spain	Embassy			
Sri Lanka	High Commission			
Sudan	Embassy			
Sweden	Embassy			
Switzerland	Embassy			
Thailand	Embassy			
Timor-Leste	Embassy			
Tonga	High Commission			
Turkey	Embassy			
Tuvalu	High Commission			
Uganda	High Commission			
Ukraine	Embassy			
United Arab Emirates	Embassy			
United Kingdom	High Commission			
United States	Embassy			
Uruguay	Embassy			
Vanuatu	High Commission			
Vietnam	Embassy			
Zambia	High Commission			
Zimbabwe	Embassy			

=== Other delegations or representative offices ===
- European Union (Delegation)
- National Unity Government of Myanmar (Representative Office)
- Palestine (Embassy- To Open)
- Sahrawi Republic (Representative Office)
- Taiwan (Economic & Cultural Office)
- United Nations (Information Centre)

== Consular missions ==
=== Adelaide, South Australia ===
Sending Country	Mission	Notes	Image	Ref(s)
China	Consulate-General			
Greece	Consulate-General			
Italy	Consulate			

=== Darwin, Northern Territory ===
Sending Country	Mission	Notes	Image	Ref(s)
Indonesia	Consulate			
Timor-Leste	Consulate-General	Also serves (Western Australia) WA		

=== Brisbane, Queensland ===
Sending Country	Mission	Notes	Image	Ref(s)
China	Consulate-General			
India	Consulate-General			
Italy	Consulate			
Japan	Consulate-General			
Nauru	Consulate-General			
Papua New Guinea	Consulate-General			
Solomon Islands	Consulate-General			
South Korea	Consulate			
Republic of China (Taiwan)	Economic & Cultural Office			
United Kingdom	Consulate-General			

=== Cairns, Queensland ===
Sending Country	Mission	Notes	Image	Ref(s)
Japan	Consular Office			
Papua New Guinea	Consulate			

=== Melbourne, Victoria ===
Sending Country	Mission	Notes	Image	Ref(s)
Chile	Consulate-General	Also serves (South Australia) SA, (Tasmania) TAS, and (Western Australia) WA		
China	Consulate-General	Also serves (Tasmania) TAS		
Croatia	Consulate-General	Also serves (Tasmania) TAS		
Egypt	Consulate-General	Also serves (South Australia) SA, (Tasmania) TAS, and (Western Australia) WA		
El Salvador	Consulate-General			
Eritrea	Consulate-General			
France	Consulate-General			
Greece	Consulate-General			
Hungary	Consulate-General	Also serves (South Australia) SA and (Tasmania) TAS		
India	Consulate-General	Also serves (Tasmania) TAS		
Indonesia	Consulate-General	Also serves (Tasmania) TAS		
Iraq	Consulate-General			
Ireland	Consulate-General			
Italy	Consulate-General	Also serves (Tasmania) TAS		
Japan	Consulate-General	Also serves (South Australia) SA and (Tasmania) TAS		
Lebanon	Consulate-General			
Malaysia	Consulate-General			
Malta	Consulate-General			
New Zealand	Consulate-General			
North Macedonia	Consulate-General	Also serves (Northern Territory) NT, (South Australia) SA, and (Tasmania) TAS		
Pakistan	Consulate-General	Also serves (South Australia) SA and (Tasmania) TAS		
Peru	Consulate-General	Also serves (Tasmania) TAS		
Philippines	Consulate-General			
Romania	Consulate	Also serves (South Australia) SA, (Tasmania) TAS, and (Western Australia) WA		
South Korea	Consulate-General			
Spain	Consulate-General	Also serves (South Australia) SA, (Tasmania) TAS, and (Western Australia) WA		
Sri Lanka	Consulate-General			
Republic of China (Taiwan)	Economic & Cultural Office			
Turkey	Consulate-General	Also serves (South Australia) SA, (Tasmania) TAS, and (Western Australia) WA		
United Kingdom	Consulate-General	Also serves (South Australia) SA & (Tasmania) TAS		
United States	Consulate-General	Also serves (Northern Territory) NT, (South Australia) SA, and (Tasmania) TAS		

=== Perth, Western Australia ===
Sending Country	Mission	Notes	Image	Ref(s)
China	Consulate-General			
Croatia	Consulate			
Greece	Consulate			
India	Consulate-General			
Indonesia	Consulate-General			
Italy	Consulate			
Japan	Consulate-General			
Malaysia	Consulate-General			
South Korea	Consulate-General			
United Kingdom	Consulate-General	Also serves (Northern Territory) NT (commercial matters only)		
United States	Consulate-General			
Vietnam	Consulate-General			

=== Sydney, New South Wales ===
Sending Country	Mission	Notes	Image	Ref(s)
Argentina	Consulate-General	Also serves Fiji		
Austria	Consulate-General			
Bangladesh	Consulate-General	Also serves (Queensland) QLD		
Brazil	Consulate-General			
Canada	Consulate-General	Also serves (Northern Territory) NT, (Queensland) QLD		
Chile	Consulate-General			
China	Consulate-General			
Colombia	Consulate-General			
Croatia	Consulate-General			
Czech Republic	Consulate-General			
Denmark	Consulate-General			
East Timor	Consulate-General			
Egypt	Consulate-General			
Fiji	Consulate-General			
France	Consulate-General			
Germany	Consulate-General			
Greece	Consulate-General			
Hungary	Consulate-General			
India	Consulate-General	Also serves (South Australia) SA		
Indonesia	Consulate-General	Also serves (Queensland) QLD and (South Australia) SA		
Iraq	Consulate-General			
Ireland	Consulate-General			
Italy	Consulate-General			
Japan	Consulate-General			
Lebanon	Consulate-General			
Malaysia	Consulate-General			
Malta	Consulate-General			
Netherlands	Consulate-General			
New Zealand	Consulate-General			
Pakistan	Consulate-General			
Papua New Guinea	Consulate-General			
Paraguay	Consulate-General			
Peru	Consulate-General			
Philippines	Consulate-General			
Poland	Consulate-General			
Portugal	Consulate-General			
Romania	Consulate-General			
Russia	Consulate-General			
Samoa	Consulate-General			
Saudi Arabia	Consulate-General			
Serbia	Consulate-General			
Slovakia	Consulate-General			
South Korea	Consulate-General			
Spain	Consulate-General			
Switzerland	Consulate-General			
Republic of China (Taiwan)	Economic & Cultural Office			
Thailand	Consulate-General			
Turkey	Consulate-General			
United Kingdom	Consulate-General			
United States	Consulate-General	Also serves (Norfolk Island) NFI, (Queensland) QLD		
Uruguay	Consulate-General			
Vanuatu	Consulate-General			
Vietnam	Consulate-General			

== Non-resident embassies and high commissions ==
=== Resident in Beijing, China ===
1. Burundi
2. Eritrea
3. Sierra Leone
4. South Sudan
5. Trinidad and Tobago
6. Venezuela

=== Resident in Jakarta, Indonesia ===
1. Bahrain
2. North Korea
3. Somalia
4. Suriname
5. Tanzania
6. Tunisia
7. Yemen

=== Resident in New Delhi, India ===
1. Equatorial Guinea
2. Niger
3. Iceland
4. Seychelles

=== Resident in Singapore ===
1. Kazakhstan
2. Maldives
3. Rwanda
4. Uzbekistan

=== Resident in Tokyo, Japan ===
1. Armenia
2. Belarus
3. Benin
4. Burkina Faso
5. Cameroon
6. Djibouti
7. Dominican Republic
8. Guinea
9. Ivory Coast
10. Jamaica
11. Kyrgyzstan
12. Malawi
13. Mali
14. Mauritania
15. Mozambique
16. Senegal
17. Turkmenistan

=== Resident elsewhere ===
1. Barbados (London)
2. Bolivia (Ottawa)
3. Eswatini (Kuala Lumpur)
4. Gambia (London)
5. Guyana (Ottawa)
6. Haiti (Hanoi)
7. Lesotho (Kuala Lumpur)
8. Madagascar (Port Louis)
9. Monaco (Monte Carlo)
10. Marshall Islands (Suva)
11. Montenegro (Podgorica)
12. San Marino (San Marino)

== Closed missions ==
Host city	Sending country	Mission	Year closed	Ref.
Canberra	Belarus	Embassy	2018	
Canberra	Ivory Coast	Embassy	2020	
Canberra	Eritrea	Embassy	2013	
Canberra	North Korea	Embassy	2008	
Canberra	Paraguay	Embassy	2024	
Canberra	South Vietnam	Embassy	1975	
Canberra	Syria	Embassy	2012	
Canberra	Tunisia	Embassy	2022	
Canberra	Venezuela	Embassy	2025	
Adelaide	New Zealand	Consulate-General	1990	
Adelaide	United Kingdom	Consulate	2006	
Brisbane	New Zealand	Consulate-General	2010	
Brisbane	United States	Consulate	1980s	
Melbourne	Oman	Consulate-General	2023	
Melbourne	United Arab Emirates	Consulate-General	Unknown (Note: Most likely closed somewhere between 2018 and 2026.)	
Perth	New Zealand	Consulate-General	1990	
Sydney	Costa Rica	Consulate-General	2020	
Sydney	Finland	Consulate-General	2012	
Sydney	Kazakhstan	Consulate-General	2024	
Sydney	Mexico	Consulate-General	2001	
Sydney	Sweden	Consulate-General	1995	
Townsville	Empire of Japan	Consulate	1908	

== See also ==
- Foreign relations of Australia
- Visa requirements for Australian citizens
