= List of ambassadors of Greece to Australia =

Ambassador of Greece to Australia
- Style: Excellency
- Residence: Embassy of Greece, Canberra
- Appointer: Minister of Foreign Affairs
- Inaugural holder: Dimitri M. Lambros
- Formation: 1953
- Deputy: Ioannis Ferentinos

The Greek Ambassador to Australia is the Greek Government's primary diplomatic representative in the Commonwealth of Australia. The Greek Ambassador to Australia also holds non-resident accreditation to New Zealand, Fiji, the Solomon Islands, Papua New Guinea, Kiribati, Samoa, Tonga, and Nauru.

== Ambassadors of Greece to Australia ==
The holders of the post since its establishment in 1953 are:

- Dimitri M. Lambros (30/3/1953 - 8/9/1956)
- George Christodoulou (19/12/1956 - 25/8/1961)
- P. Anninos Cavalieratos (23/11/1961 - 11/7/1963)
- Basil Tsamissis (17/8/1965 - 5/7/1971)
- Alexis Stephanou (8/9/1971 - 16/3/1974)
- Nikolaos Diamantopoulos (23/1/1975 - 28/8/1980)
- Alexander Vayenas (21/10/1980 - 30/3/1985)
- Efthymios Tzaferis (19/4/1985 - 22/12/1990)
- Vassilis Zafiropoulos (7/5/1991 - 24/11/1993)
- George Constantis (29/12/1993 - 9/6/1997)
- Ioannis Beveratos (7/7/1997 - 19/12/2001)
- Fotios–Jean Xydas (7/3/2002 - 15/12/2005)
- George Zois (28/8/2006 - 5/9/2009)
- Alexios G. Christopoulos (17/9/2009 - 9/8/2012)
- Charalampos Dafaranos (1/11/2012 - 9/1/2016)
- Ekaterini Xagorari (24/02/2016 - 2019)
- Georges Papacostas (20/2/2020 - 2023)

Stavros Venizelos (2024-present)
