= Crawford Falconer =

UK and New Zealand civil servant (born 1954)

Sir Crawford Falconer KCMG
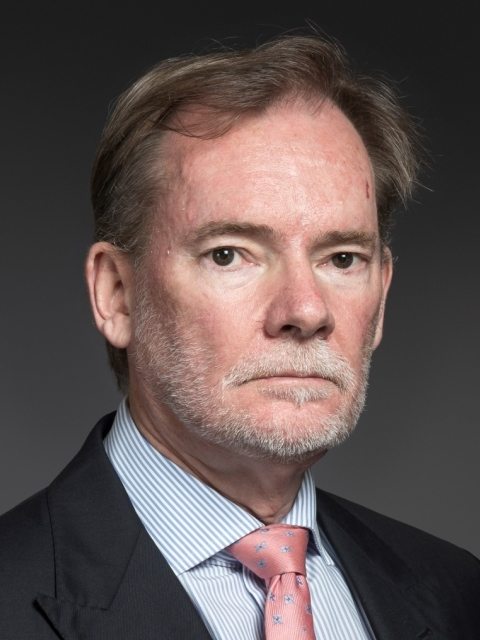
- Official portrait, 2017
- Born: Greenock, Renfrewshire, Scotland
- Education: Victoria University of Wellington, London School of Economics
- Occupation: Trade negotiator

Sir Crawford Dunlop Falconer KCMG (born 1954) is a British diplomat who served as the United Kingdom's Chief Trade Negotiation Adviser, based at the Department for Business and Trade (DBT). He was recruited to the Civil Service in 2017 during the run-up to Brexit. He also led trade negotiation and served as the Second Permanent Secretary for DBT from 2023 to 2024.

Falconer has served in variety of roles including the New Zealand Ambassador and Permanent Representative to the World Trade Organisation (WTO), and as New Zealand's Chief Negotiator and Adviser. Previous to his job in the Brexit trade negotiations he was Special Trade Commissioner for the Legatum Institute, a private think tank.

In 2019 it was reported that despite the support of Conservatives in favour of Brexit, he had had little access to Prime Minister Theresa May.

Three years later, as the Australia–United Kingdom Free Trade Agreement was about to come into force, George Eustice, who had been part of the negotiating team as Secretary of State for Environment, Food and Rural Affairs, faulted the deal as "not actually a very good deal for the UK" in a speech to the House of Commons and blamed Falconer, calling him "not fit for that position, in my experience". Eustice said Falconer "always [internalised] Australian demands, often when they were against UK interests, his advice was invariably to retreat and make fresh concessions and all the while he resented people who understood technical issues greater than he did." He suggested Falconer be replaced.

Falconer was appointed Knight Commander of the Order of St Michael and St George (KCMG) in the 2024 New Year Honours for services to international trade.

== Personal life ==
In 1978 he married his wife and they have two daughters: Beatrice Falconer (born 1983) and Leonora Falconer (born 1985).
