= Australia–United Kingdom relations =

- Australia: United Kingdom

Diplomatic mission
- High Commission of Australia, London: High Commission of the United Kingdom, Canberra

Envoy
- High Commissioner Jay Weatherill: High Commissioner Dame Sarah MacIntosh

Very strong relations exist between Australia and the United Kingdom, marked by historical, cultural, institutional, extensive people-to-people links, aligned security interests, sporting tournaments (notably the Ashes), and significant trade and investment co-operation. As Commonwealth realms, the two countries are in personal union, with the head of state of both being Charles III.

== History ==
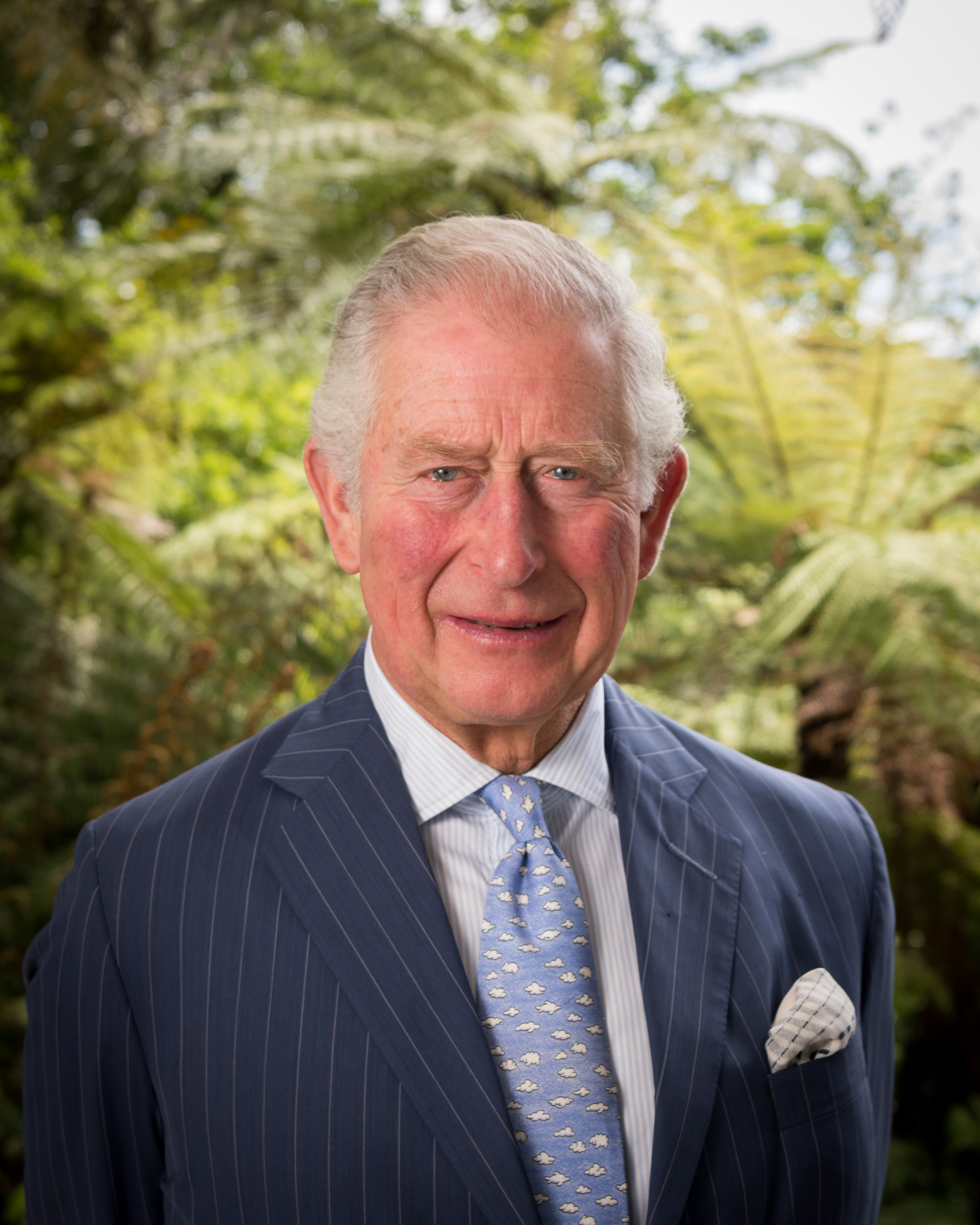
Australia and Britain share a sovereign, Charles III

In 1770, Royal Navy Lieutenant James Cook, during his first voyage to the Pacific, sailed along and mapped the east coast of Australia, which he named New South Wales and claimed for Great Britain. 17 years later, following the loss of its American colonies in 1783, the British Government sent a fleet of ships, the First Fleet, under the command Arthur Phillip, to establish a new penal colony in New South Wales. A camp was set up and the flag raised at Sydney Cove on 26 January 1788, and the British Crown Colony of New South Wales was formally promulgated on 7 February 1788. Further Crown Colonies were established in Van Diemen's Land (now known as Tasmania) in 1803; Swan River Colony (now known as Western Australia) in 1828; South Australia in 1836; Victoria in 1851; and Queensland in 1859. The six colonies federated in 1901 and the Commonwealth of Australia was formed as a Dominion of the British Empire.

Australia fought alongside Britain and its Allies in World War I, notably at Gallipoli (against the Ottoman Empire) and the Western Front. It fought with Britain and its allies again in World War II, protecting Britain's Pacific colonies from Imperial Japan.

Until 1949, Britain and Australia shared a common nationality code. The final constitutional ties between the United Kingdom and Australia ended in 1986 with the passing of the Australia Act 1986.

Formal economic relations between the two countries declined following Britain's accession to the European Economic Community in 1973. Nevertheless, the United Kingdom remains the second largest overall foreign investor in Australia. In turn, Australia is the seventh largest foreign direct investor in Britain.

Due to Australia's history as a colony of Britain, the two nations retain significant shared threads of cultural heritage, many of which are common to all English-speaking countries. English is the de facto language of both nations. Both legal systems are based on the common law.

Pom is a common nickname given by Australians to British people, said in jest without malice or prejudice, in a similar way to how British (and other) people call Australians Aussies, and refer to Australia as "Oz" or "down under" (a reference to the fact that Australia is notable for being entirely in the southern hemisphere).

In June 2021, the countries agreed on a historic free trade agreement, which was signed on 17 December 2021.

== Migration ==
Streams of migration from the British Isles to Australia played a key role in Australia's development, and the people of Australia are still predominantly of British or Irish origin (See: Anglo-Celtic Australians). According to the 2011 Australian Census, around 1.1 million Australians were born in Britain, despite the last substantial scheme for preferential migration from Britain to Australia ending in 1972.

Former Australian prime minister Julia Gillard was born in Barry, Vale of Glamorgan in Wales. The former leader of the Liberal Party of Australia and former prime minister Tony Abbott was also born in Britain, although to an Australian-born mother.

There is a population of around 100,000 Australians in Britain, especially in Greater London.

In recent years there has been growing support for the idea of freedom of movement between the UK, Canada, Australia and New Zealand with citizens able to live and work in any of the four countries - similar to the Trans-Tasman Travel Arrangement between Australia and New Zealand. The Australia–United Kingdom Free Trade Agreement includes increased freedom of movement between the two countries.

== Military ==
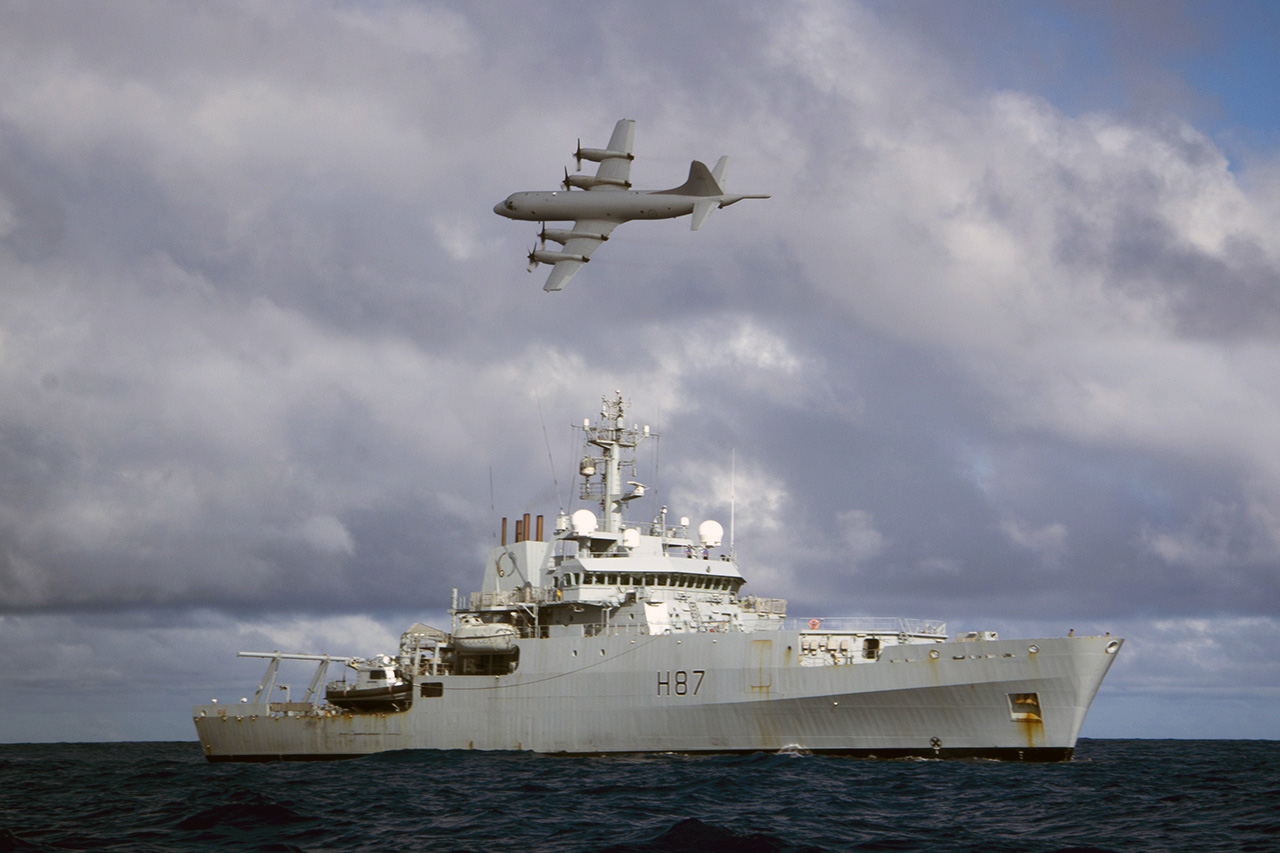
Australian AP-3C Orion joins UK survey ship HMS Echo in the search for MH370

The two countries have a long history of close collaboration in military affairs. In modern times they are members of the AUSCANNZUKUS security cooperation including the Five Eyes intelligence-sharing alliance with the US, Canada and New Zealand, and the Five Power Defence Arrangements with Malaysia, Singapore and New Zealand. They also collaborate in ad hoc groupings like Combined Task Force 151 to counter piracy off Somalia, and the search for Malaysia Airlines Flight 370 in 2014. Australia shared the British honours system until 1975, and so four Australians were awarded the Victoria Cross in the Vietnam War despite Britain not participating. Australia created its own VC in 1991, made from the same block of metal as the British ones.

On 15 September 2021, the leaders of the U.S., the UK and Australia announced AUKUS a trilateral security partnership for the Indo-Pacific region that will "promote deeper information and technology sharing" and "foster deeper integration of security and defense-related science, technology, industrial bases, and supply chains". The partnership "will significantly deepen cooperation on a range of security and defense capabilities" including "to support Australia in acquiring nuclear-powered submarines for the Royal Australian Navy". The long-term strategic goal is to help neutralize Chinese military expansion to the South. China has denounced the agreement as "extremely irresponsible".

In March 2023, AUKUS announced a new class of nuclear-powered submarine would be built SSN-AUKUS based on a United Kingdom's submarine design that will incorporate technology from all three nations, including cutting edge US submarine technologies. The SSN-AUKUS class will be built and operated by both the UK and Australia.

The two countries signed a defence and security cooperation agreement on 21 March 2024.

== Diplomacy ==
The contemporary political relationship between London and Canberra is underpinned by a robust bilateral dialogue at head-of-government, ministerial and senior officials level. As Commonwealth realms, the two countries share a monarch, King Charles III, and are both active members within the Commonwealth of Nations. In 2006, British Prime Minister Tony Blair became the first British head of government to address the Australian Parliament.

In September 2012, the UK and Canada signed a Memorandum of Understanding on diplomatic cooperation, with the intention of extending the scheme to include Australia and New Zealand.

After the UK voted to leave the European Union in June 2016, Australian Prime Minister Malcolm Turnbull phoned British Prime Minister Theresa May to float the idea of a free trade agreement between the two nations post-Brexit. Australia was one of the first nations to publicly express interest in such an agreement after the vote. The Australian Prime Minister has also suggested that an immigration and commercial accords could be negotiated with the two nations and New Zealand. Proposed closer ties and preferential visa access between Australia, the United Kingdom, New Zealand and Canada named CANZUK has been argued for by numerous individuals in both countries for several years.

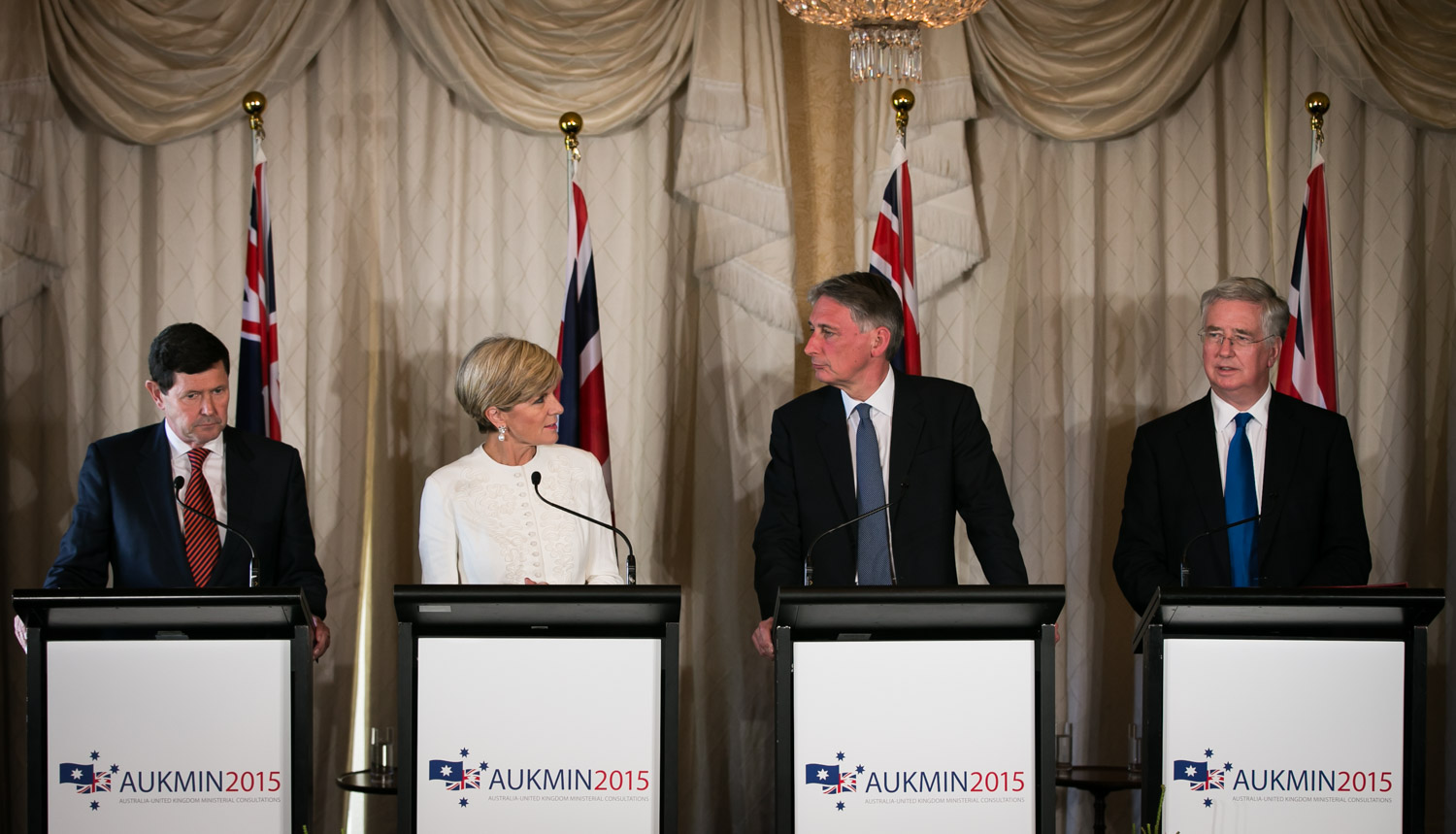
The Australia - UK Ministerial (AUKMIN) press conference in Sydney, February 2015.

== Trade ==
Following the United Kingdom's withdrawal from the European Union, Australia and the UK opened negotiations on signing a bilateral free trade agreement. The Australia-United Kingdom Free Trade Agreement was signed on 17 December 2021. It was the first free trade agreement signed completely anew since Brexit. The agreement was ratified by the UK on the 24 March 2023. Prior to the King's Coronation, the Prime Ministers of Australia and the United Kingdom agreed that the FTA would enter force on 31 May 2023.

In July 2023, the United Kingdom signed an agreement to accede to the Comprehensive and Progressive Agreement for Trans-Pacific Partnership. It is a Pacific Rim-focused trade bloc, which Australia was a founding member of in 2018.

== Sport ==
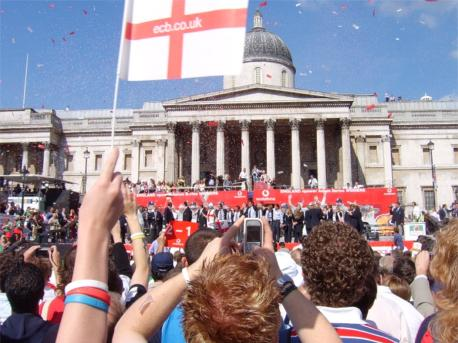
London celebrates England's victory in the 2005 Ashes cricket series

Australia excels in many sports that originate in England, and the two countries enjoy a close sporting rivalry. The rivalry is typified by their Test cricket series for the Ashes; there were ticker-tape parades when England won the 2005 series after 18 years of Australian domination. The finest moment of the England rugby union team was beating Australia to win the 2003 Rugby World Cup in Sydney; their rugby league counterparts have been far less successful. The two countries usually vie for leadership of the medal table at the Commonwealth Games. In 2014 England came top with 174 medals and Australia second with 137 medals. Melbourne golfer Peter Thomson is the second-most successful at The Open Championship with 5 wins. The two share a similar rivalry at the Olympic Games: throughout the latter half of the 20th century, Australia was the more successful, finishing above Britain at all but three Olympic Games between 1956 and 2012, the nadir occurring in 1996 when Australia finished in 7th place and Great Britain finished in 36th place. Australian tennis players have been particularly successful in the men's doubles at Wimbledon with pairings such as Mark Woodforde and 9-time winner Todd Woodbridge; Rod Laver, John Newcombe and Margaret Court all won multiple singles titles at Wimbledon but no British player has won the Australian Open since 1934. Following the conclusion 2024 Summer Olympics in Paris it was British-born track cyclist Matthew Richardson who had won three medals whilst competing for Australia at the aforementioned 2024 Olympics would be switching his allegiance to the British Cycling team following a successful application to the Union Cycliste Internationale (UCI) to change allegiance. This defection was not well received in Australia with AusCycling saying it was exploring the option of whether to enforce a two-year 'non-competition order' on Richardson which would effectively ban the three-time Olympic medallist from competing for British team on the international stage until 2026.

== Culture ==
There is a long history of cultural exchange between the two countries, and Australians often use Britain as a stepping-stone to international success, whether these are artists such as Barry Humphries or businessmen such as Rupert Murdoch who controls flagship newspapers such as The Times and has a large stake in pay-TV company BSkyB. Australian soap operas became particularly popular in the late 1980s and 1990s, with Neighbours commanding British daily audiences of 19 million in 1990 although this declined to 5 million by 2007, still nearly ten times the Australian audience. Soap alumni such as Kylie Minogue, Dannii Minogue and Jason Donovan have continued to have successful careers in music and on the stage in Britain, while Neighbours has even been held responsible for introducing the rising inflection to England. Australian comedians have thrived in the UK, from Clive James to Adam Hills and Tim Minchin. Academic Germaine Greer played a leading role in British gender politics after the publication of The Female Eunuch in London in 1970. Gallerist Rebecca Hossack was the Australian Cultural Development Officer in London from 1993 to 1997. Vassilie Trunoff led tours of his native Australia as ballet master of what became the English National Ballet. In autumn 2013, the Royal Academy held a major survey of Australian art.

== Industry ==
Monthly value of Australian merchandise exports to the United Kingdom (A$ millions) since 1988

Monthly value of UK merchandise exports to Australia (A$ millions) since 1988

The City of London has been funding the development of resources in Australia since colonial times, and Anglo-Australian companies have become some of the biggest multinational mining companies such as Rio Tinto and BHP. The oil industry in Australia started with Commonwealth Oil Refineries, a collaboration between the Australian government and the Anglo-Persian Oil Company (later BP). Ties are strong in the media industry; Rupert Murdoch's involvement in British newspapers and BSkyB is mentioned above, but Fremantle has gone the other way to acquire and merge Crackerjack Productions with the creators of Neighbours.

The relationship is supported through the Australian British Chamber of Commerce in Australia and Australian Business in the UK based in the Australia Centre in London.

== British nuclear test ==
The British carried out 12 nuclear tests on Australian territory from October 3, 1952, until October 9, 1957, the three test zones are Emu Field, Montebello Islands and Maralinga.

== Science and engineering ==
The two countries jointly operated the Anglo-Australian Observatory until 2010 including the Anglo-Australian Telescope and UK Schmidt Telescope at Siding Spring Observatory in New South Wales. The Anglo-Australian Joint Project set up Woomera Test Range in South Australia in 1946 to test missiles such as Blue Steel; more recently it has been used to test the BAE Systems Taranis, a prototype unmanned combat aircraft.

== Opinion polls ==
According to a 2020 poll by YouGov, Australia is the third most positively perceived country by the British, with 79% having a favourable view. It ranked behind fellow commonwealth members Canada and New Zealand, which 80% viewed positively. A 2020 poll by the Lowy Institute suggests that the United Kingdom is the second most positively viewed country by Australians, behind Canada.

== Resident diplomatic missions ==
of Australia in the United Kingdom

- London (High Commission)

of the United Kingdom in Australia

- Canberra (High Commission)
- Brisbane (Consulate-General)
- Melbourne (Consulate-General)
- Perth (Consulate-General)
- Sydney (Consulate-General)

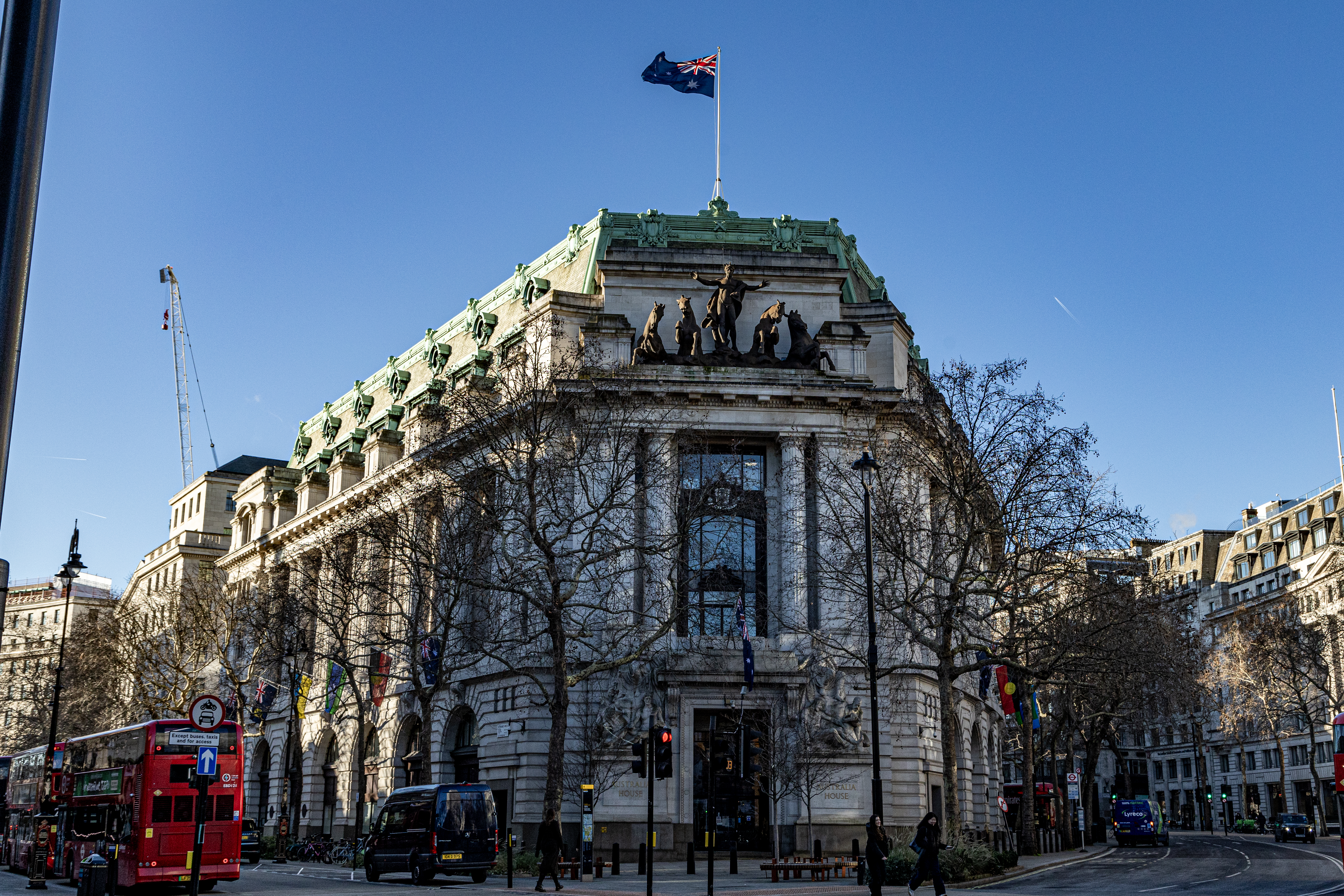
Australian High Commission in London.

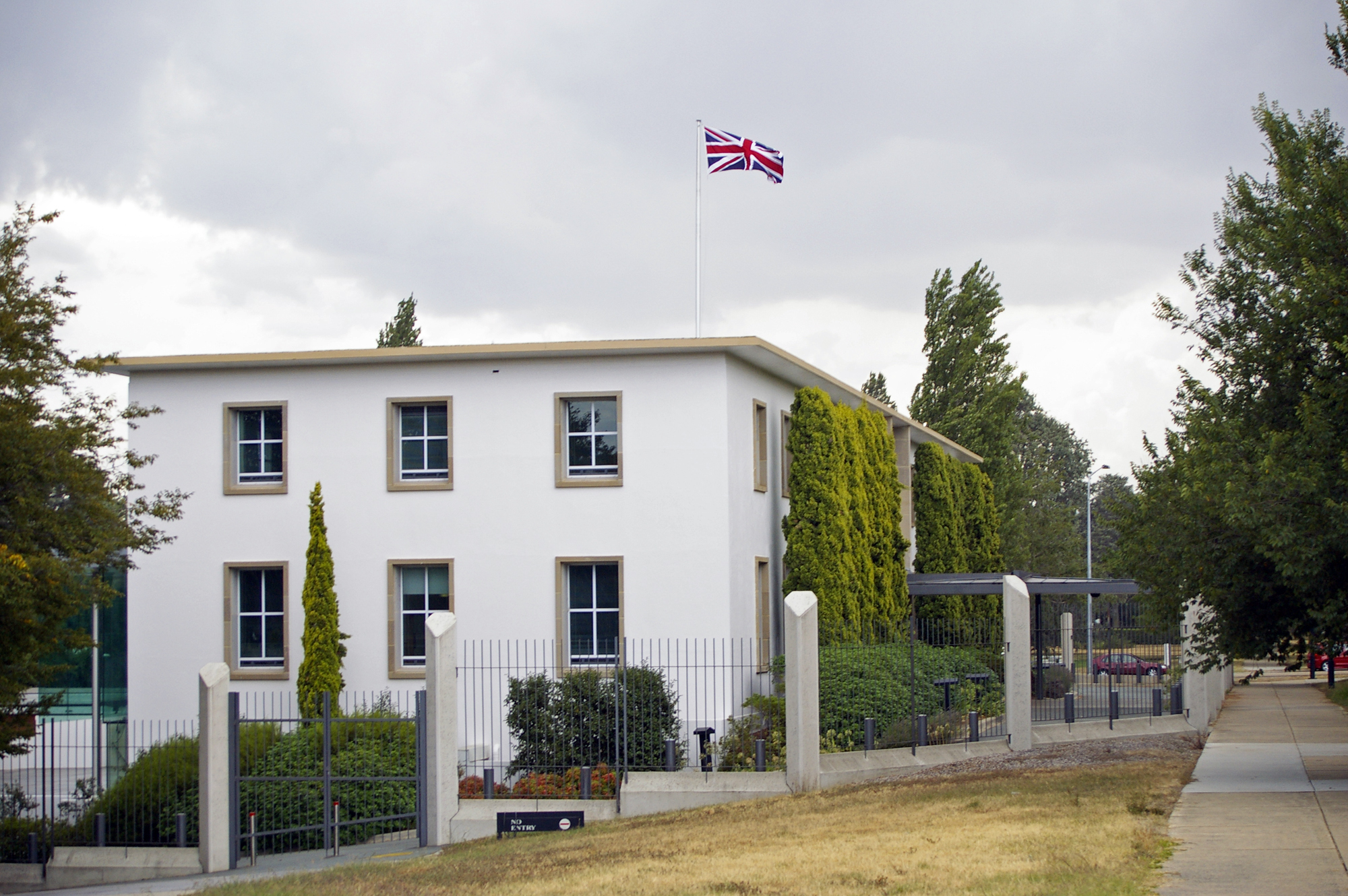
British High Commission in Canberra.

== Sister cities ==
- (England) Berwick-upon-Tweed, Northumberland and (Victoria (state)) Casey, Victoria
- (England) Bexley, Greater London and (Victoria (state)) Footscray, Victoria
- (England) Coventry, West Midlands and Parkes, New South Wales
- (England) Fenland, Cambridgeshire and Shire of Maroochy, Queensland
- (England) Helston, Cornwall and Port Augusta, South Australia
- (England) King's Lynn, Norfolk and (Victoria (state)) Sandringham, Victoria
- (England) Launceston, Cornwall and Launceston, Tasmania
- (England) Lincoln, Lincolnshire and Port Lincoln, South Australia
- (England) Newcastle upon Tyne, Tyne and Wear and Newcastle, New South Wales
- (England) Penrith, Cumbria and Penrith, New South Wales
- (England) Penzance, Cornwall and (Victoria (state)) Bendigo, Victoria
- (Scotland) Perth, Perth & Kinross and Perth, Western Australia
- (England) Portsmouth, Hampshire and Sydney, New South Wales
- (England) Whitby, North Yorkshire and Cooktown, Queensland
- (England) Whitby, North Yorkshire and West Wyalong, New South Wales
- (England) Tamworth, Staffordshire and Tamworth, New South Wales

== See also ==
- Anglosphere
- Britain–Australia Society
- Anglo-Celtic Australian
- English Australian
- Scottish Australian
- Welsh Australian
- Australians in the United Kingdom
- New Zealand–United Kingdom relations
