= Embassy of Russia, Canberra =

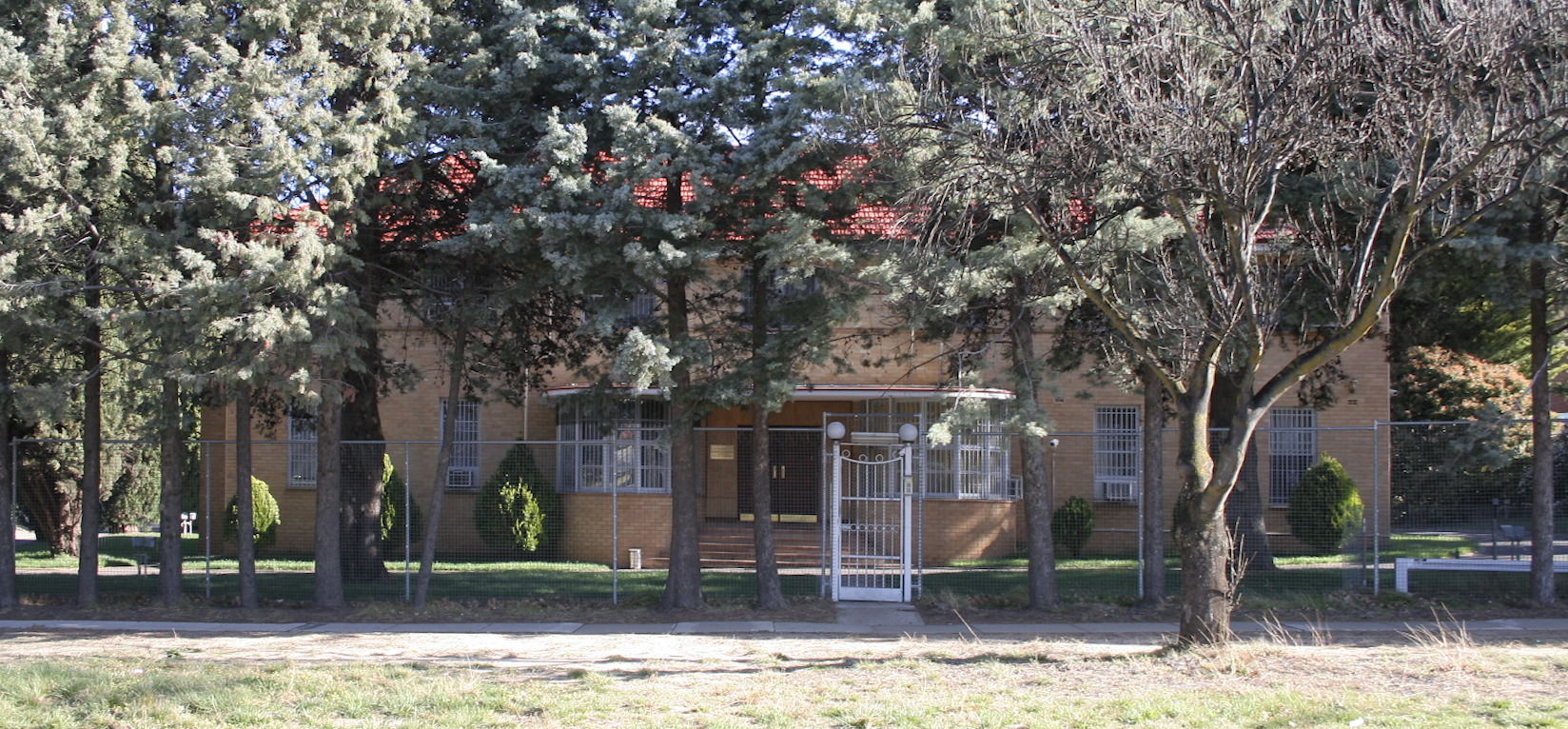
Embassy of Russia, Canberra

The Embassy of Russia in Australia is the Russian embassy in Canberra, Australian Capital Territory. It is located at 78 Canberra Avenue, Griffith, to the east of the Manuka shopping precinct.

Russia also has a consulate in Sydney.

The allocation of the site was made by the National Capital Planning and Development Committee (NCPDC), later named the National Capital Authority (NCA).

== Site and history ==
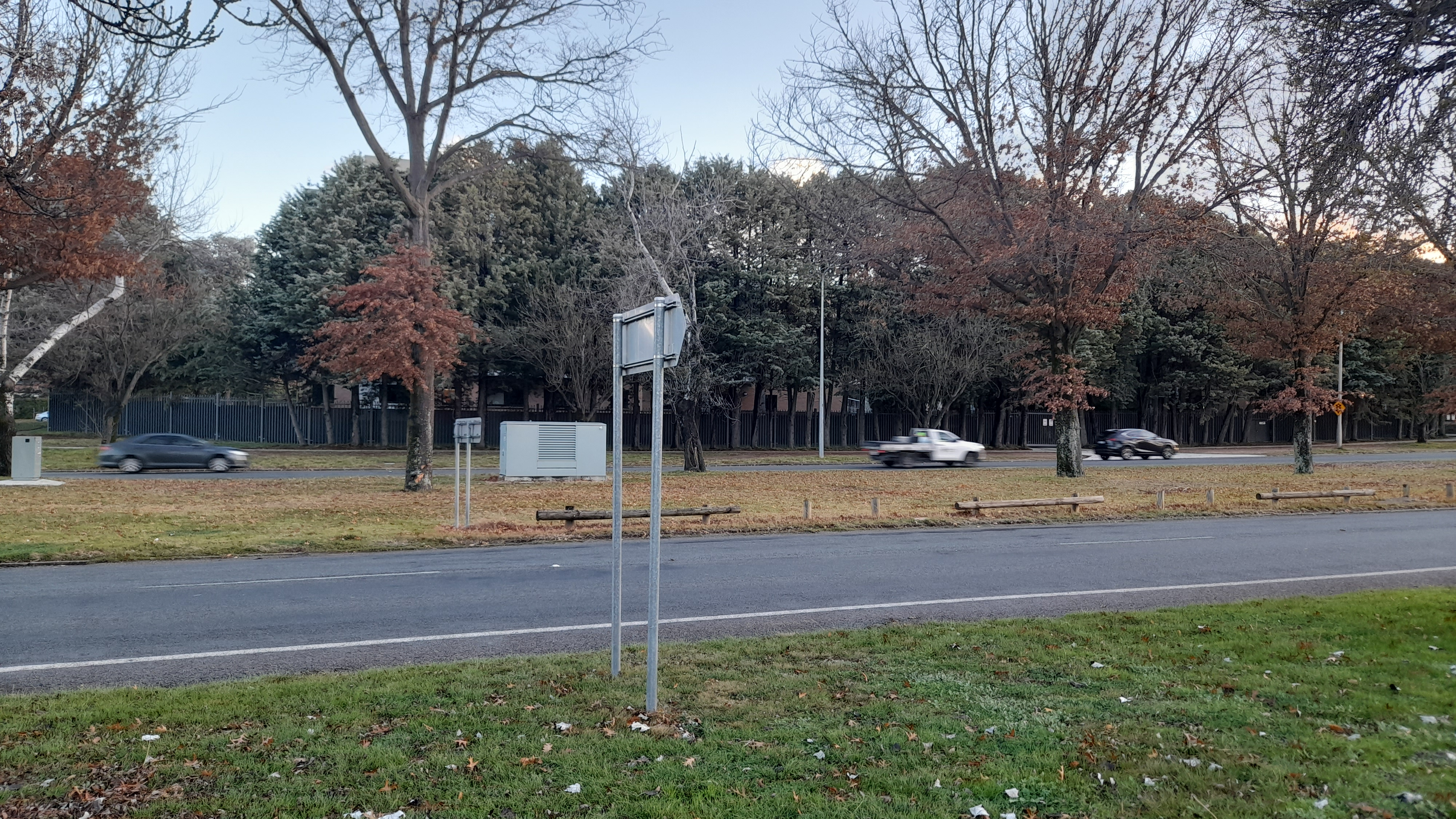
Embassy of Russia, Canberra (Griffith site)

Griffith is a mostly island site bounded by Canberra Avenue, Lefroy Street, Evans Crescent, Light Street, and to the west by a walking path from Light St to Canberra Ave. A block of accommodation on Evans Cr shares the south-western boundary. The site has a line of pine trees along Canberra Avenue, and is enclosed by a high steel fence.

The site formerly had a Russian elementary school in its eastern portion, demolished in 2021 and replaced with what appears to be an accommodation block.

=== Petrov Affair ===
Vladimir Petrov was an official at the embassy, who defected to Australia in 1954 after contacting the Australian Security Intelligence Organisation (ASIO). His wife, Evdokia, was unaware of his intentions. They were eventually given asylum in Australia, and settled into an obscure life under assumed names. The series of events is known as the Petrov Affair.

=== Yarralumla site, 2008–2023 ===
35.303633°S 149.120740°E

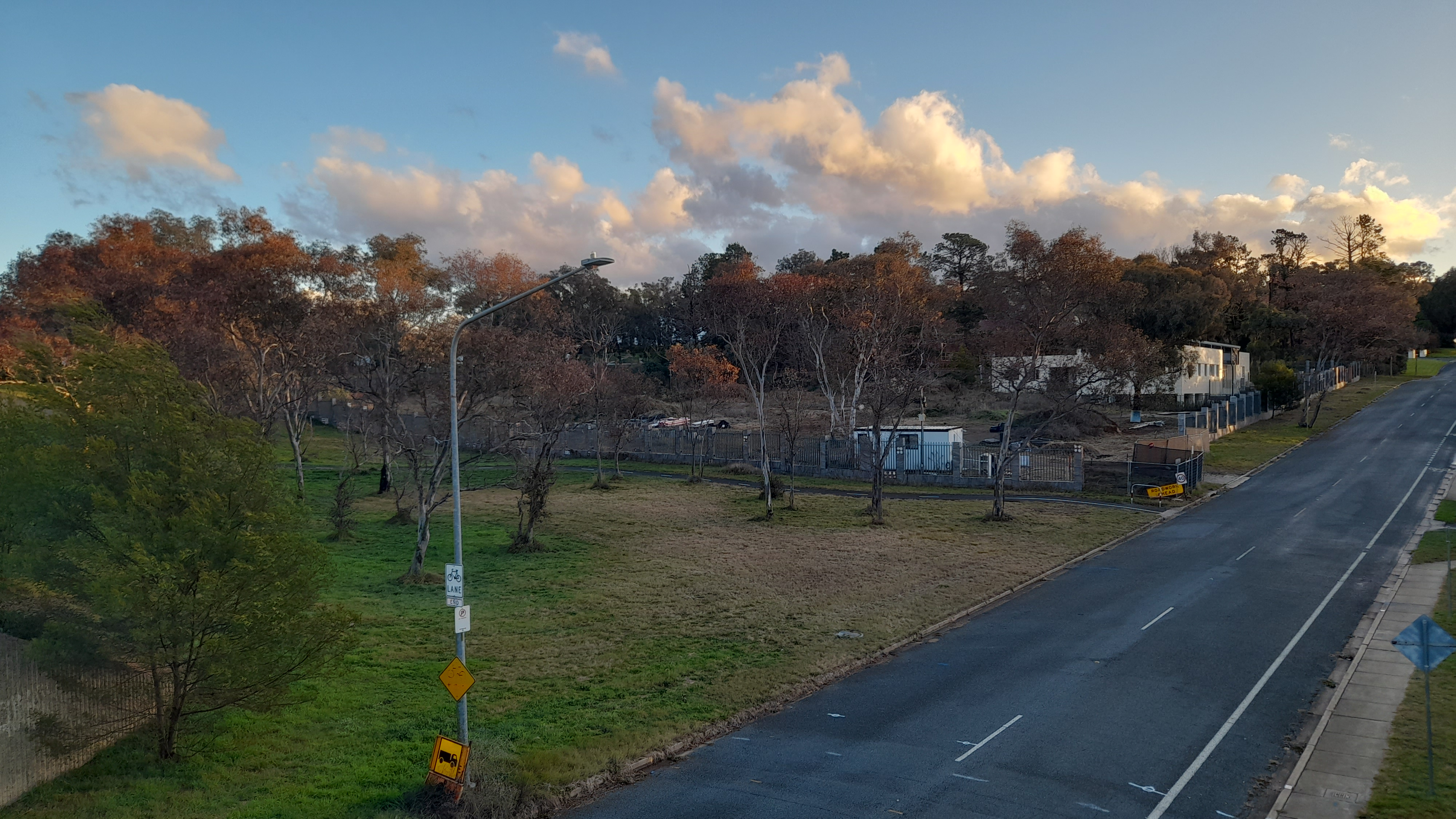
Embassy of Russia, Canberra (Yarralumla Site)

In 2008, a new embassy site at 29 Forster Crescent, Yarralumla, was allocated to Russia, with completion of the new building by 2014. In 2011, it received building permission.

In August 2022, after a lack of activity, the NCA sought return of the unfinished site within 20 days on a "use it or lose it" basis. This seemed to coincide with the Russian invasion of Ukraine in February 2022, however the NCA denied any link.

In September 2022, the Russian Government took the NCA to court.

In May 2023, Justice Steven Rares of the Federal Court of Australia sided with the Government of Russia, and ordered the NCA not to re-enter the land, take possession of the land, or interfere with the Russian government's "quiet enjoyment of the land".

The Parliament of Australia passed the Home Affairs Act 2023 in one day through both houses of parliament. "The Home Affairs Bill 2023 terminates, on commencement, the relevant lease... ", effectively returning the land to the Commonwealth of Australia which would be "liable to pay a reasonable amount of compensation". The Bill was said to be necessary "to protect Australia's national security interests", according to Clare O’Neil MP, Minister for Home Affairs. Following the legislation, the Government was aware that a Russian diplomat was squatting in the Yarralumla property, after a stand-off with Australian Federal Police which chose to not detain the person due to diplomatic immunity. The Prime Minister, Anthony Albanese, commented that "A bloke standing in the cold on a blade of grass in Canberra is not a threat to our national security." The Russian Government later challenged the legislation in the High Court of Australia, arguing the law was unconstitutional. It was ruled constitutional in November 2025.

== See also ==
- List of ambassadors of Russia to Australia
- Australia–Russia relations
- Embassy of Australia, Moscow
- List of diplomatic missions of Russia
- List of diplomatic missions in Australia
