= High Commission of the United Kingdom, Canberra =

British High Commission Canberra
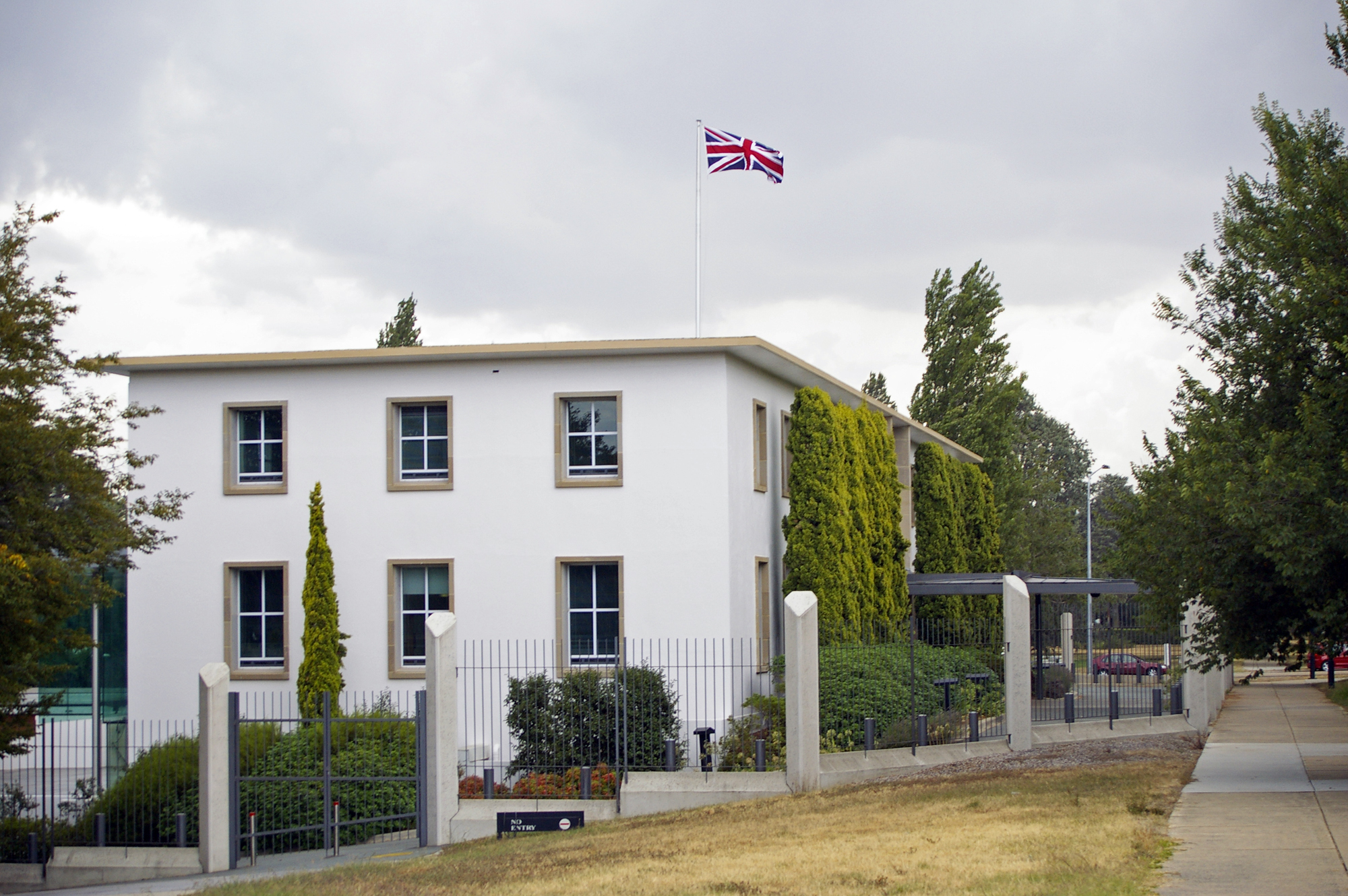
- The British High Commission building in Canberra
- Location: (Australia) Yarralumla, Canberra
- Address: 130 Commonwealth Avenue, Yarralumla, Canberra
- Coordinates: 35.3013°S 149.1250°E
- High Commissioner: HE Dame Sarah MacIntosh , British High Commissioner
- Website: Official website

The British High Commission Canberra is the diplomatic mission of the Government of the United Kingdom to Australia, representing the United Kingdom and the United Kingdom's interests. It is located on Commonwealth Avenue along with the High Commissions of New Zealand and Canada in the Canberra suburb of Yarralumla. The current British High Commissioner is Dame Sarah MacIntosh who was appointed in April 2025.

== History ==
Prior to the establishment the post of the British High Commissioner to [the Commonwealth of] Australia in 1936, the Governor-General of Australia acted and served as both the chief official intergovernmental representative of the British Government to the Government of Australia, as well as the personal official representative of the Crown, acting in his or her capacity as Australia's head of state. The appointment of a separate High Commissioner followed a series of changes in the relationships amongst the dominions and with the Crown, including the enactment of the Statute of Westminster 1931.

In the early years, the British High Commissioners rented buildings for themselves as their residence as well as the buildings for the British High Commission offices. The British High Commission Chancery building was built in 1952 at the same time as Westminster House, the High Commissioner's official residence at 76 Empire Circuit, Deakin. The northern wing extension to the High Commission was completed in 1960. The chancery and residence cost a quarter of a million pounds – an enormous amount in those days. The British High Commission building may seem comparatively modest when compared with some of the more lavish Embassy buildings in Canberra. However, at the time it was built, Britain was recovering from the devastating economic burden of World War II and needed to restore its own bomb-ravaged cities.

In late 1995 through until early 1997, the High Commission underwent a major refurbishment programme. A well-known local firm, Mitchell/Guirgola & Thorp Architects, was engaged to undertake the design work associated with the refurbishment work. The architects previously won the competition to design the New Parliament House in Canberra. Although the interior of the building was almost entirely refurbished, the building's white rendered walls and regular window spacing were retained.

== Functions ==
The High Commissioner's tasks are to present British policies to the Australian Government and to Australians, to report and explain Australian policies and views to the British Government in London, and to promote British interests. The High Commissioner coordinates the political, commercial and public affairs activities of the British Government in Australia and is in daily contact with Australian Ministers and officials.

Apart from the British High Commission Canberra, there are British Consulates-General in Sydney and Melbourne headed by British Consuls-General. There are also British Consulates in Perth and Brisbane headed by British Consuls. The duties of the British Consuls-General and the British Consuls relate to the promotion of trade and investment between Britain and Australia. They also keep the British High Commissioner in touch with political, economic and other developments in the Australian States and Territories. In addition, the British Consulates-General (but not the smaller British Consulates) provide consular assistance to British citizens and British nationals who live in, or are visiting, places which fall within their respective consular districts.

== See also ==
- Australia–United Kingdom relations
- List of diplomatic missions in Australia
- List of high commissioners of the United Kingdom to Australia
- British High Commission
