= National Beef Association =

Trade association

The National Beef Association is an organization that represents the beef cattle industry in the United Kingdom.

== History ==
The National Beef Association was formed in the early 1990s. The association meets regularly as a board, as do their four specialist committees – TB Committee, Pedigree Committee, Policy Committee, and the recently formed Animal Health Committee. Each geographical area of the country is represented at a regional level through eight forums which hold regular meetings and events which are open to all members.

== Structure ==
National Beef Association's head office is based in the Tanners House, 20 Gilesgate, Hexham, Northumberland.

Chris Mallon is the chief executive, representing the association in policy, and Rosie McGowan is development manager. The National Beef Association is led by a board of trustee directors, representing each of the regional councils; the North, the Midlands, the South West, Wales, Northern Ireland, and Scotland (Scottish Beef Association). The current chairman of the board is David Thomlinson.

The organization was incorporated as a limited company (3678612) on 4 December 1998.
