= Embassy of Greece, Canberra =

- Location within Australian Capital Territory
- 35.308939°S 149.112812°E
- Location: 9 Turrana Street, Yarralumla, ACT, 2600; Canberra, Australia

Site notes
- Website: www.mfa.gr/australia/

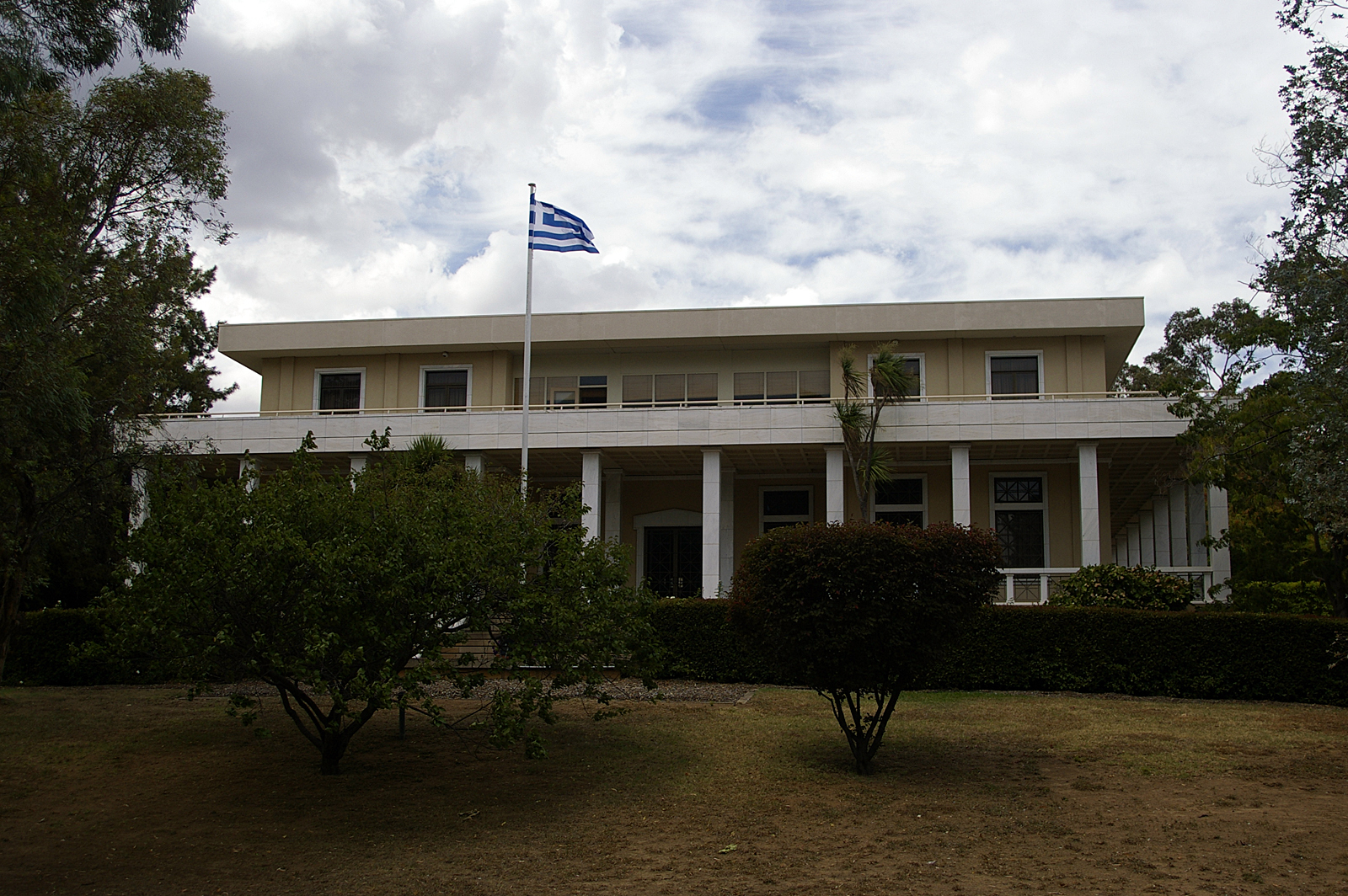
The Ambassador's residence next to the Embassy building

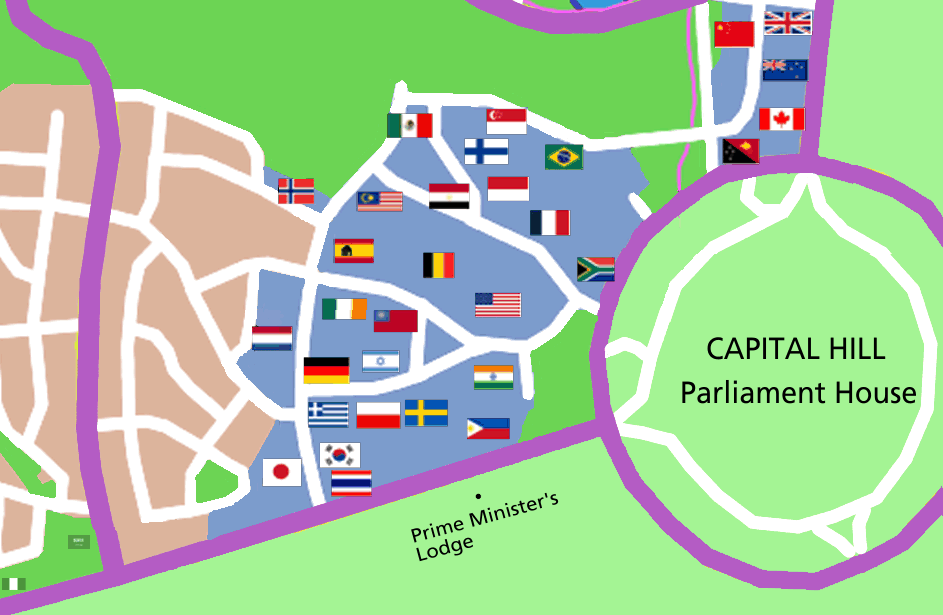
Embassies in Yarralumla including the Embassy of the Hellenic Republic

The Embassy of Greece in Canberra is the main diplomatic mission of the Hellenic Republic in Australia, and residence of the Greek Ambassador to Australia; it is currently located in the suburb of Yarralumla, a suburb in which most of Canberra's embassies are found.

== Representatives of the Hellenic Republic around Australia ==
Greece has an extensive diplomatic presence in Australia under the supervision of the Embassy of Greece in Canberra.

The following are the Greek diplomatic missions around Australia:

- Consulate General of Greece in Sydney
- Consulate General of Greece in Adelaide
- Consulate General of Greece in Melbourne
- Consulate of Greece in Perth

The following are the Greek non-diplomatic/honorary consulates around Australia:

- Honorary Consulate-General of Greece in Darwin
- Honorary Consulate of Greece in Newcastle
- Honorary Consulate of Greece in Tasmania
- Honorary Consulate-General of Greece in Brisbane

== History ==
The embassy has been located at its current location since 1983, when the Embassy of Greece was built on a plot of land allocated to the Government of the Hellenic Republic for the purpose of housing a diplomatic mission and the Ambassador's residence.

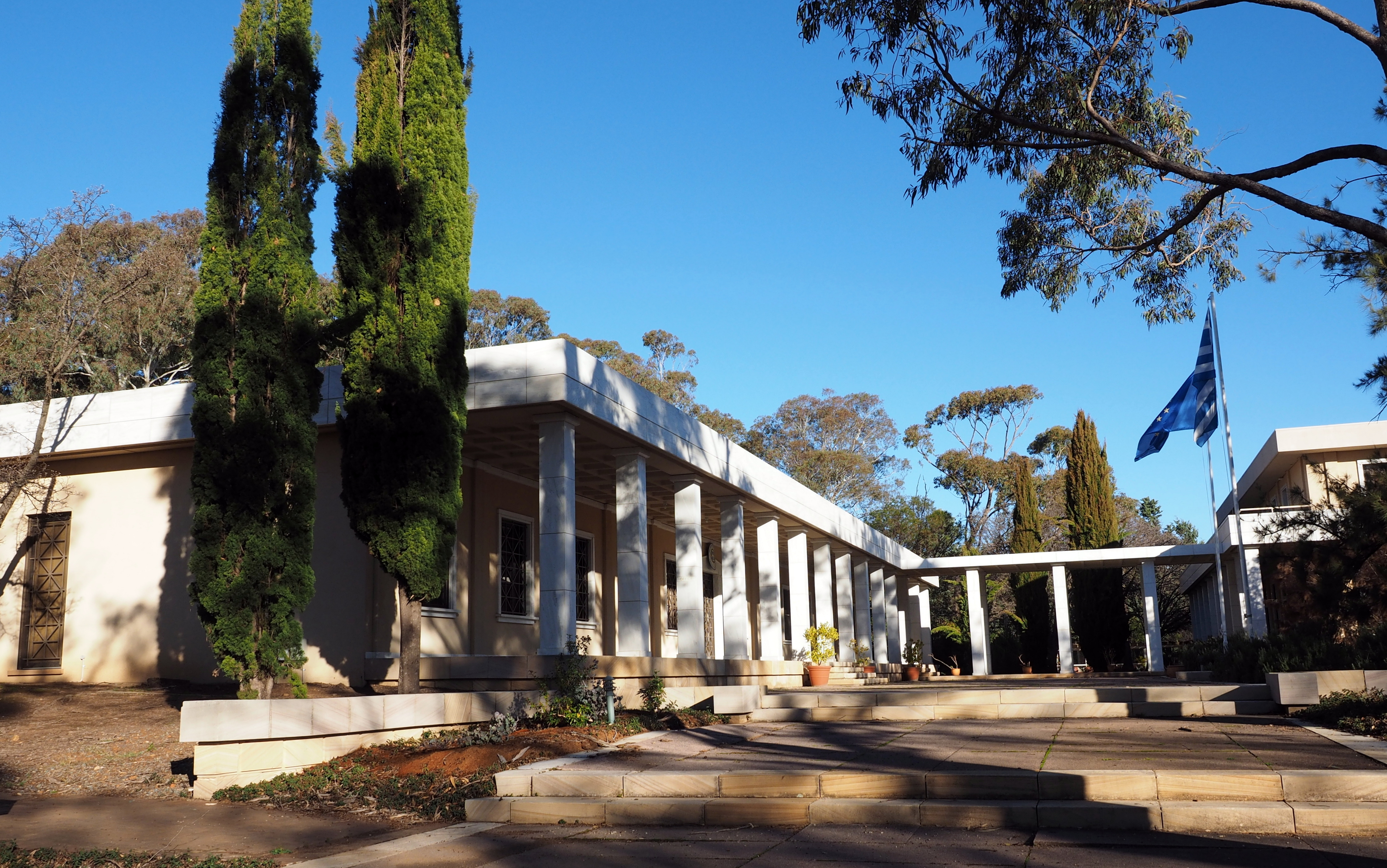
The Chancery Building of the Embassy of Greece.

== Head of the Mission ==
=== Ambassador ===
The current Ambassador of Greece to Australia is His Excellency Mr. Stavros Venizelos, Ambassador Extraordinary and Plenipotentiary, a senior career diplomat appointed by the President of the Hellenic Republic. His credentials were accepted by the Governor-General of Australia at an official ceremony in March 2024.

=== Other diplomatic staff ===
The current Deputy Head of Mission and Head of the Consular Office is Mr. Ioannis Ferentinos.

== Embassy sections ==
- Political Section
  - Managing relations between Greece and Australia.
- Consular Section
  - Responsible for providing services to Greek citizens, as well as visa services for foreign nationals wishing to visit Greece.

== See also ==
- Australia–Greece relations
