= Home Affairs Act 2023 =

Australian law

Parliament of Australia
- Long title: An Act to be administered by the Minister for Home Affairs, and for related purposes
- Citation: No. 19 of 2023
- Considered by: Australian House of Representatives
- Considered by: Australian Senate
- Assented to: 15 June 2023
- Commenced: 15 June 2023

Legislative history

First chamber: Australian House of Representatives
- Introduced by: Clare O'Neil MP, Minister for Home Affairs and Minister for Cyber Security
- First reading: 15 June 2023
- Second reading: 15 June 2023
- Third reading: 15 June 2023

Second chamber: Australian Senate
- Member(s) in charge: Sen. Murray Watt, Minister for Agriculture, Fisheries and Forestry and Minister for Emergency Management
- First reading: 15 June 2023
- Second reading: 15 June 2023
- Third reading: 15 June 2023
- Status: In force

The Home Affairs Act 2023 (Cth) is an Act of the Parliament of Australia to cancel the Russian Federation's lease on a new embassy site within 500 metres of Parliament House. The Albanese Government introduced the Act in light of the Federal Court's decision in Government of the Russian Federation v Commonwealth of Australia Anor that the National Capital Authority's decision to terminate the lease was invalid.

Although the Act is only seven sections long, it is notable for how quickly Parliament enacted the legislation, taking 1 hour and 15 minutes to pass the House of Representatives and Senate. In each chamber, the Bill was debated for less than five minutes, and was granted Royal Assent on the same day.

Dismissing Ukraine's interest in the site, Home Affairs Minister Clare O'Neill claims that the site will not be used for any other diplomatic purposes in the future due to its proximity to Parliament. Kremlin spokesperson Dmitry Peskov was disappointed by the decision, saying that Australia should not fuel anti-Russian sentiment.

On 23 June, a spokesperson for O'Neill revealed that Russia is preparing to challenge the legislation in the High Court of Australia on constitutional grounds, which came on for hearing in August 2025.
