= Working holidays in Australia =

Working holidays in Australia is a program that enables eligible young people aged between 18 and 30 years (or 35 for some countries) to visit Australia and to supplement their travel funds through incidental employment. Forms of working holiday visas (today, Work and Holiday (subclass 462) and Working Holiday (subclass 417)) have existed since January 1975, designed to "promote international understanding by enabling young people to experience the culture of another country."

In the first year of the working holiday maker program, less than 2,000 working holiday visas were issued, but that figure has grown significantly. The International Visitor Survey by the Department of Immigration and Border Protection and Tourism Research Australia reports that 121,000 working holiday makers arrive in Australia every year as of December 2016, including 57,000 from the UK, 35,200 from Korea, and 33,600 from Germany. Between 1 July 2022 and 30 June 2023, 224,431 young people from around the world obtained a working holiday visa in Australia. However, this is not the most prolific season for the WHV Australia. Indeed, in 2012/2013, 258,248 young people from around the world obtained their visa for Australia. Top 10 nationalities with the most working holiday visas in Australia in 2022–2023:

- United Kingdom: 38,177 visas obtained
- France: 26,896 visas obtained
- Ireland: 21,525 visas obtained
- Taiwan: 15,528 visas obtained
- South Korea: 14,785 visas obtained
- Japan: 14,398 visas obtained
- Italy: 13,745 visas obtained
- Germany: 13,644 visas obtained
- Argentina: 5,038 visas obtained
- USA: 5,028 visas obtained

These arrivals have a positive effect on the Australian economy estimated to spend more than $3 billion annually.

There are almost no limits to what employment a working holiday maker can undertake. While traditionally most of the jobs have been in hospitality or harvest work; many work in finance, education, health care and other industries. Working holiday visa holders are generally not covered by the Australian Medicare health insurance scheme, but they may have limited access because of a reciprocal agreement between Medicare and their home country.

== Entitlements ==
The visa allows a young visitor to stay in Australia for up to 12 months from the date of first entry to Australia, regardless of whether the visitor spends the whole time in Australia. The visa holder must validate the visa (enter Australia) within a year of issue. The holder may enter and leave Australia as often as they wish within the validity of the visa. Time spent outside of Australia is lost and cannot be re-claimed towards the one year validity period of the visa. Although the relevant visa sub classes allows the holder to work in Australia, Australian federal law restricts employment in the Australian Public Service to Australian citizens only. Non-Australian citizens may work as contractors to government, but cannot work directly for government in any capacity and must be eligible for any relevant security classifications required (which, paradoxically, requires Australian citizenship to be granted a security classification. Departmental heads of agencies can waive this requirement, however only in special circumstances).

The visa allows the visitor to work in Australia, but employment should be 'incidental' to travel and of a temporary or casual nature. People working in Australia on a working holiday visa are entitled to the same pay and work conditions as Australian residents and citizens. The cost of the visa is $635 (AUD).

== Eligibility ==
An Australian working holiday visa is available to overseas passport holders from countries with which Australia has a reciprocal agreement.

- Visa subclass 417
  - Belgium
  - Canada
  - Cyprus
  - Denmark
  - Estonia
  - Finland
  - France
  - Germany
  - Hong Kong
  - Ireland
  - Italy
  - Japan
  - South Korea
  - Malta
  - Netherlands
  - Norway
  - Sweden
  - Taiwan
  - United Kingdom
- Visa subclass 462
  - Argentina
  - Austria
  - Brazil
  - Chile
  - China
  - Czech Republic
  - Ecuador
  - Greece
  - Hungary
  - Indonesia
  - Israel
  - Luxembourg
  - Malaysia
  - Mongolia
  - Papua New Guinea
  - Peru
  - Poland
  - Portugal
  - San Marino
  - Singapore
  - Slovakia
  - Slovenia
  - Spain
  - Switzerland
  - Thailand
  - Turkey
  - United States
  - Uruguay
  - Vietnam

Other important conditions are that the person:

- is aged between 18 and 30 inclusive (18 to 35 for British, Canadian, Danish, French, Irish, and Italian passport holders) and does not have any dependent children.
- is able to show sufficient funds for a return or onward fare as well as sufficient funds for the first part of their stay. A sufficient amount is regarded as being a minimum of A$5,000 (£2,600), although the amount may vary depending the length of stay and how much traveling is intended during that stay. A return or onward ticket or the funds for a fare to depart Australia if travelling on a one-way ticket is also necessary.
- is of good character and of good health.

The application for the first working holiday visa must be made outside of Australia – in most cases this can be from anywhere outside Australia. However, the following passport holders must lodge their application in the country or region that issued their passport:
Republic of Cyprus, Ecuador HKSAR (including British National Overseas), Japan, the Republic of Korea, Malta, and Taiwan. These countries have a few extra requirements.

As most working holiday visa agreements are based on reciprocity, Australian citizens can also obtain working holiday visas in any of the partner countries except China and Switzerland.

== Other conditions ==
Other conditions for the visa holder generally include:

- their work should be incidental to travel, with the main purpose for the visit being tourism.
- the visa holder must not work for the same employer for more than 6 months, unless in more than one location.
- the visa holder must not study for more than 4 months.
- the visa holder is required to meet health criteria, and depending on circumstances, may need to undertake a medical examination which may include a chest x-ray, HIV, Hepatitis B and/or Hepatitis C test.
- the visa holder must have access to sufficient funds to support themselves for the initial stage of the holiday. Generally, A$5,000 may be regarded as sufficient, but the amount may vary depending on the length of stay and the extent of travel.
- the visa holder should also have a return or onward ticket or the funds for a fare to depart Australia.

== Second working holiday visa ==
An Australian working holiday visa is normally a one-year, once in a lifetime entitlement for eligible visitors. However, since 2005, working holiday visa holders can extend their stay in Australia by another year by applying for a second working holiday visa. The extension is available only to those who had worked as a seasonal worker in specified industries (primarily agricultural or in hospitality) in regional Australia for a minimum of three months during their first visa period. Applications for a second Australian working holiday visa can be made in or outside Australia.

Typical work to qualify for the second working holiday visa includes farming, pearling, construction and other specified work in a regional area. Backpackers on the working holiday visa have become an essential part of workforces in many farming communities due to the specified work requirement. However, specified work has become controversial. This is because some backpackers have claimed they have been mistreated on farms and lived in poor conditions in working hostels. In 2019, The Guardian reported the exploitation that some backpackers have endured such as: being paid as little as $4 an hour, working in unsafe and gruelling conditions and reports of sexual abuse. Many of these claims have been supported by empirical evidence.

A study conducted in 2020 found that just under half (42.5%) of the sample of working holiday makers (n.573) had experienced exploitation during their working holiday, and that much of this exploitation had occurred during the specified work period. In response to the low pay, from 28 April 2022, it was announced that fruit pickers on farms who would usually be on a piece-rate agreement must be guaranteed a minimum hourly rate of $25.41. Racism, including structural racism within workplaces, has also been identified as a concern.

From 1 July 2024, UK citizens will be exempt from the specified work requirement if they wish to apply for a second (or third) working holiday visa in Australia. In September, 2026 it was announced that second and third year visa eligibility will be subject to a ballot system. While further details are yet to be released, experts have raised concerns about the potential impact of these changes on regional communities who rely heavily on working holiday makers.

== Third working holiday visa ==
As of 1 July 2019, working holiday visa holders who undertake six months of specified work (for example: fruit picking or construction) in a specified regional area during their second year may be eligible for a third-year visa.
