= Alexander Nikolayevich Abaza =

Russian diplomat

Alexander Abaza

Russian Consul-General in Australia
- In office 31 December 1910 – 27 January 1918
- Preceded by: Matvei Hedenstrom
- Succeeded by: Peter Simonoff (Soviet Russia)

Personal details
- Born: 4 August 1872 (O.S.) Tiflis, Russian Empire (present-day Georgia)
- Died: 6 November 1925 (aged 53) Alexandria, Egypt

Alexander Nikolayevich Abaza (Russian: Алекса́ндр Никола́евич Абаза́; 4 August 1872 (O.S.) – 6 November 1925) was a Russian diplomat who served as the last Russian consul-general in Australia before the October Revolution of 1917, which brought the Bolsheviks to power. He sometimes used the surname d'Abaza to indicate his nobility.

== Early life ==
Abaza was born in Tiflis (present-day Tbilisi, Georgia) into a noble family of Moldavian origin; his father served on the Mixed Courts of Egypt. He attended grammar school in Kharkov, graduating in 1891, before going on to the Alexander Lyceum in Saint Petersburg. His great-uncles included Alexander Ageevich Abaza and Nikolai Savvich Abaza, while a second cousin was Alexey Abaza.

== Diplomatic career ==
Abaza joined the Imperial Foreign Ministry in 1895. His first postings were in Galati, Jerusalem, and Bangkok. In 1905, he was appointed as the Russian consul in Alexandria, Egypt. While in London in 1910, he married Frederica Sophia Sperlich (of German origin). His first marriage to Yelizaveta Aleksandrovna Mossolova had ended in divorce.

=== Australia ===
In June 1910, Abaza was appointed as the Russian consul-general for Australia, based in the temporary capital of Melbourne. He and his wife arrived in the country on 31 December. Believing that Oceania could become a new market for Russian goods, he travelled widely within the region, becoming the first Russian diplomat to visit New Zealand, Tonga, Samoa, Fiji, and the New Hebrides.

Abaza's tenure saw in an increase in the number of Russian immigrants to Australia, which in mid-1914 he estimated at 11,000 plus another 1,000 in New Zealand. About 5,000 of those were in Queensland, and he made multiple trips to Brisbane. Abaza played a key role in the enlistment of Russians into the Australian Imperial Force (AIF). In late 1915, he passed on to the Australian government the order from Tsar Nicholas II requiring his subjects to either return to Russia to enlist or to enlist in the militaries of the Allies. In 1916, he unsuccessfully lobbied the Australian government to ban Russians from leaving the country without consular permission, and to require them to annually register at consulates. He was, however, successful in lobbying the Department of Defence to ban the radical newspaper Izvestiya, a publication of the Brisbane-based Union of Radical Workers.

After the February Revolution in 1917, Abaza expressed his support for the Russian Provisional Government. The new government authorised him to assist political prisoners in returning home, providing funds for their passage if necessary. He used his authority primarily to assist liberals and Mensheviks. Shortly before the October Revolution, Abaza travelled to Brisbane to monitor Russian radicals suspected of disseminating anti-war propaganda; he coordinated the visit with Australian military intelligence. On 24 December 1917, he wrote to Prime Minister Billy Hughes dissociating himself from the new regime, stating that he represented "those of my people who are absolutely faithful to the Allies" and would resign if Russia made peace with Germany. He wrote a second letter to Hughes on 26 January 1918, stating that he had tendered his resignation with effect from the following day. He was likely responsible for the destruction of the consulate archives.

== Later life ==
Abaza left Australia in March 1918 and returned to Alexandria, where his father lived. He died on 6 November 1925, followed five months later by his second wife. They were buried at the Greek Orthodox cemetery in Shatby.

== Sources ==
- Govor, Elena (2005). Russian Anzacs in Australian History. UNSW Press. ISBN 9780868408569.
- Massov, Alexander; Pollard, Marina; Windle, Kevin, eds. (2018). "Alexander Abaza" (PDF). A New Rival State?: Australia in Tsarist Diplomatic Communications. ANU Press.
