= Russian House (Melbourne) =

Russian cultural centre in Fitzroy, Victoria, Australia

- Русский Дом в Мельбурне
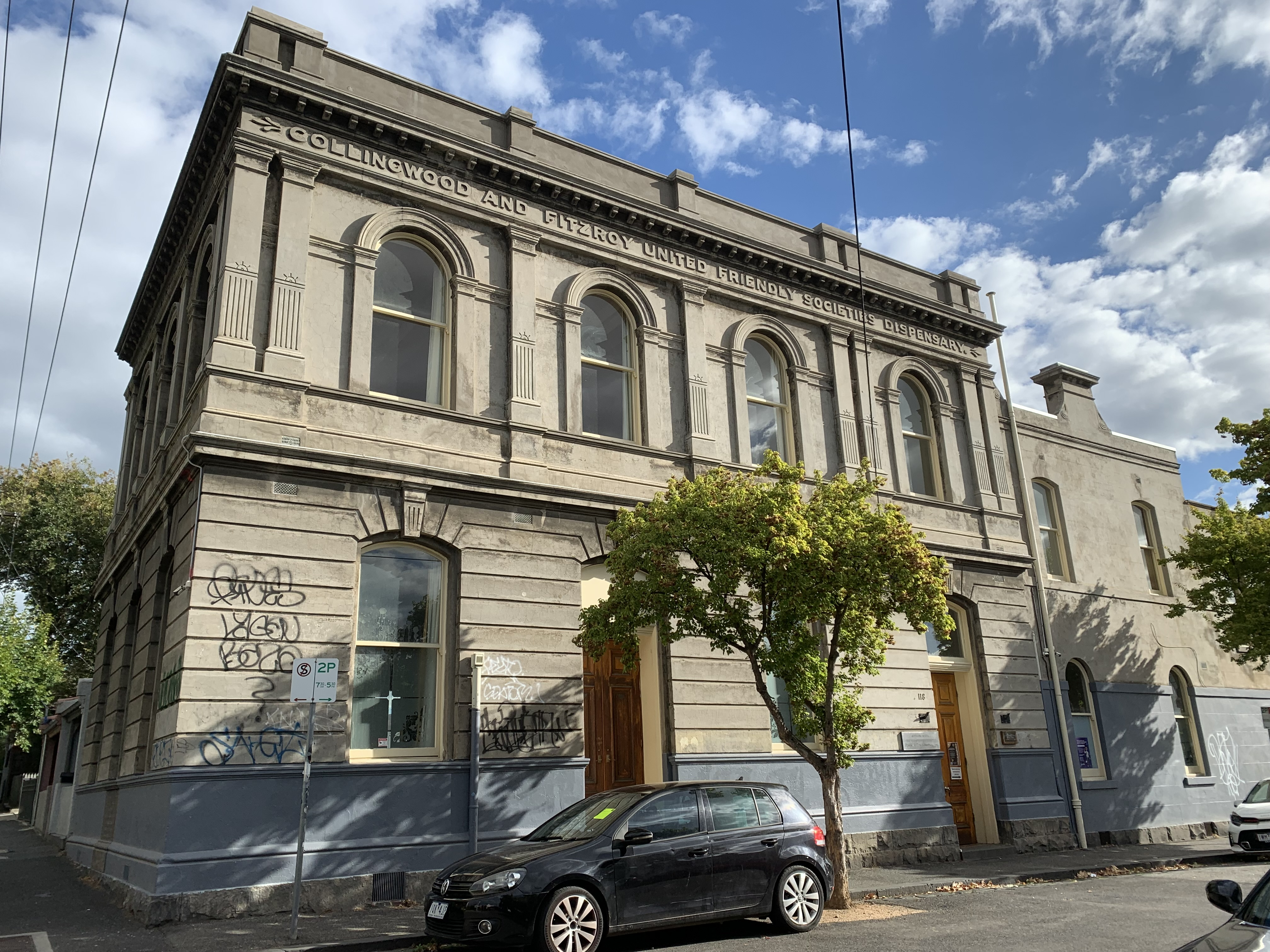
- Russian House

- Location in Melbourne, Victoria
- Interactive map of Russian House
- 37°48′01″S 144°58′58″E
- Location: Fitzroy, Melbourne, Victoria, Australia

History
- Built: 1884; 142 years ago

Site notes
- Website: russianhousemelbourne.org.au

Russian House (Russian: Русский Дом в Мельбурне) is a Russian cultural centre located in the Melbourne suburb of Fitzroy, Victoria, Australia. The building was constructed in 1884 for the Collingwood & Fitzory United Friendly Societies' Dispensary, who used the building until 1968 when it became a cultural centre. The building has since been home to a large variety of cultural activities and performances for the local Russian community and Russian speakers alike. The building is listed on the local government heritage reigster.

== History ==
=== Collingwood & Fitzroy United Friendly Societies Dispensary ===
The foundation stone for the Collingwood & Fitzroy United Friendly Societies' Dispensary was laid on the afternoon of Friday 12 September 1884. Because of poor weather, there was less attendance for the ceremony than expected. The society was composed of members derived from the Manchester Unity Oddfellows, the Druids, Ancient Order of Foresters, Grand United Order of Oddfellows, and others. The dispensary provided the local community with medical care and medication. The building ceased being used as a dispensary somewhere in the 1950s-early 1960s, and subsequently fell into disrepair.

=== Conversion to Russian House ===
Following the arrival of large numbers of Russian migrants to Melbourne from Europe and China in the late 1940s, there emerged a clear need for a central venue to support cultural, educational, and social activities within the community. Various organisations were established during this period, including church parishes and political and social groups. Many of these organisations later united under the Russian National Representation of Victoria (RNP), which maintained a strongly anti-communist position.

In July 1962, a proposal by Efrem Mokry led to the creation of a new branch within the RNP, initially known as the Russian Public Centre. A general meeting held on 24 March 1963 formally approved the establishment of the organisation and its constitution, marking the foundation of what would later become known as Russian House. A provisional governing board was elected soon afterwards. By 1964, the organisation had separated from the RNP and became independent, and in June 1967 it was officially registered.

Efforts to secure a permanent premises began in the mid-1960s, culminating in the purchase of the present building in 1967. Although the building required substantial repairs, it was renovated and consecrated in 1968, with regular use beginning the following year. The venue generated income through room rentals and community activities, including performances, rehearsals, and social events. Early programming also featured lectures, literary gatherings, concerts, film screenings, and the publication of community materials.

In 1970, the organisation hosted the first Festival of Russian Poets of Australia, attracting dozens of participants and resulting in a published collection of works. Around the same time, a library was established, initially comprising several hundred Russian and English-language volumes. Leadership transitioned in 1971 to Mikhail Klimetsky, who served for approximately 25 years. During this period, the venue became a focal point for community life, and fundraising efforts enabled the full repayment of the building loan by 1977.

Throughout the 1980s, Russian House continued to host cultural initiatives, including a second national poetry festival in 1983. Committees formed during this decade organised lecture series on Russian history and culture, as well as humanitarian efforts, notably fundraising and assistance for victims of the Chernobyl disaster. Exchange initiatives also brought children from affected regions to Melbourne.

Activity declined in the early 1990s, but revived later in the decade following organisational restructuring and the election of new leadership. The adoption of an English-language constitution and incorporation strengthened the institution's administrative framework. Renovations to the building were undertaken, and leasing arrangements with other Russian community organisations improved financial stability.

Further development occurred in the 2000s under successive boards, including significant upgrades to facilities and expansion of membership. A purpose-built library extension, completed in 2010 with government support and community donations, enabled the housing of a collection of approximately 10,000 Russian-language books.

Since the late 2000s, additional renovations have modernised the building, including upgrades to interior spaces, amenities, and technical equipment.

On August 30, 2014, Russian House celebrated its 50th anniversary, with various festivities taking place.

In 2019, the building underwent a major renovation, which included the freso of the Church of the Intercession on the Nerl being restored.

== See also ==
- Russian Australians
- Russian Orthodox Diocese of Sydney, Australia and New Zealand
- Russian diaspora
- Architecture of Melbourne
