= Embassy of Australia, Moscow =

Embassy of Australia in Moscow Посольство Австралии в Москве
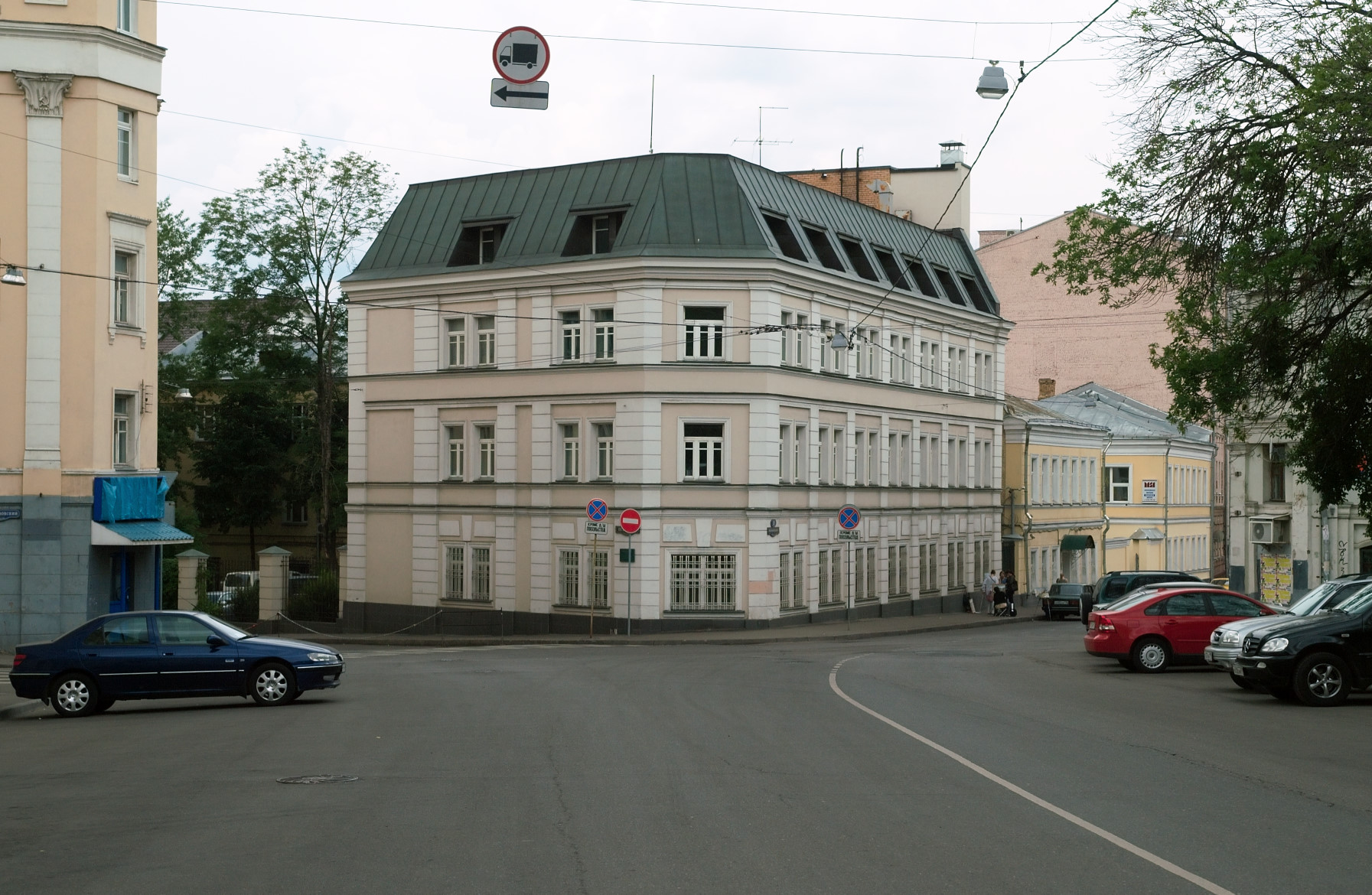
- Location: Moscow
- Address: 10A/2 Podkolokolny Lane
- Coordinates: 55°45′9.3522″N 37°38′32.4096″E
- Ambassador: John Geering

The Embassy of Australia in Moscow is the diplomatic mission of Australia to the Russian Federation. The current head of post and Ambassador of Australia to the Russian Federation is John Geering. The embassy serves as the diplomatic mission for Australia to the Russian Federation, Armenia, Belarus, Kazakhstan, Kyrgyzstan, Tajikistan, Turkmenistan and Uzbekistan. The chancery is located at 10A/2 Podkolokolny Lane (Russian: Подколокольный переулок, д. 10А/2) in the Tagansky District of Moscow.

Australia opened diplomatic relations with the Soviet Union in 1942. Between 1942 and the present day, the embassy has undergone numerous changes to both location and function as a result of changing relations between the two nations. These include changes to the status of the embassy – from unofficial diplomatic mission to consulate and finally embassy, changes to the nations the embassy is responsible for servicing, and specific events in the Australia-Russia relationship that have modified the operation of the embassy, the most notable of which being the Petrov Affair which culminated in the expulsion of the embassy and the cessation of official diplomatic relations between Australia and the Soviet Union in 1954.

== History ==
=== Russian Empire (1803–1917) ===
Though Australia and the Russian Empire had held de jure relations since 1803, official relations between the Australian colonies and the empire were not made until 1857, with the appointment of two honorary consuls to Australia by the Russian Empire; James Damyon in Melbourne and E.M. Paul in Sydney.

In 1890, the Russian government in Saint Petersburg concluded that Anglo-Russian relations in the south Pacific were important enough to appoint a career diplomat to represent the Russian Empire in the Australian colonies. The Imperial Ministry for Foreign Affairs established the position of Imperial Russian Consul to the Colonies in Melbourne. Despite the establishment of official relations between the two nations, no permanent embassy or ambassadorial position was ever established by the Australian colonies of the Commonwealth of Australia in the Russian Empire.

=== Soviet Union (1917–1954) ===
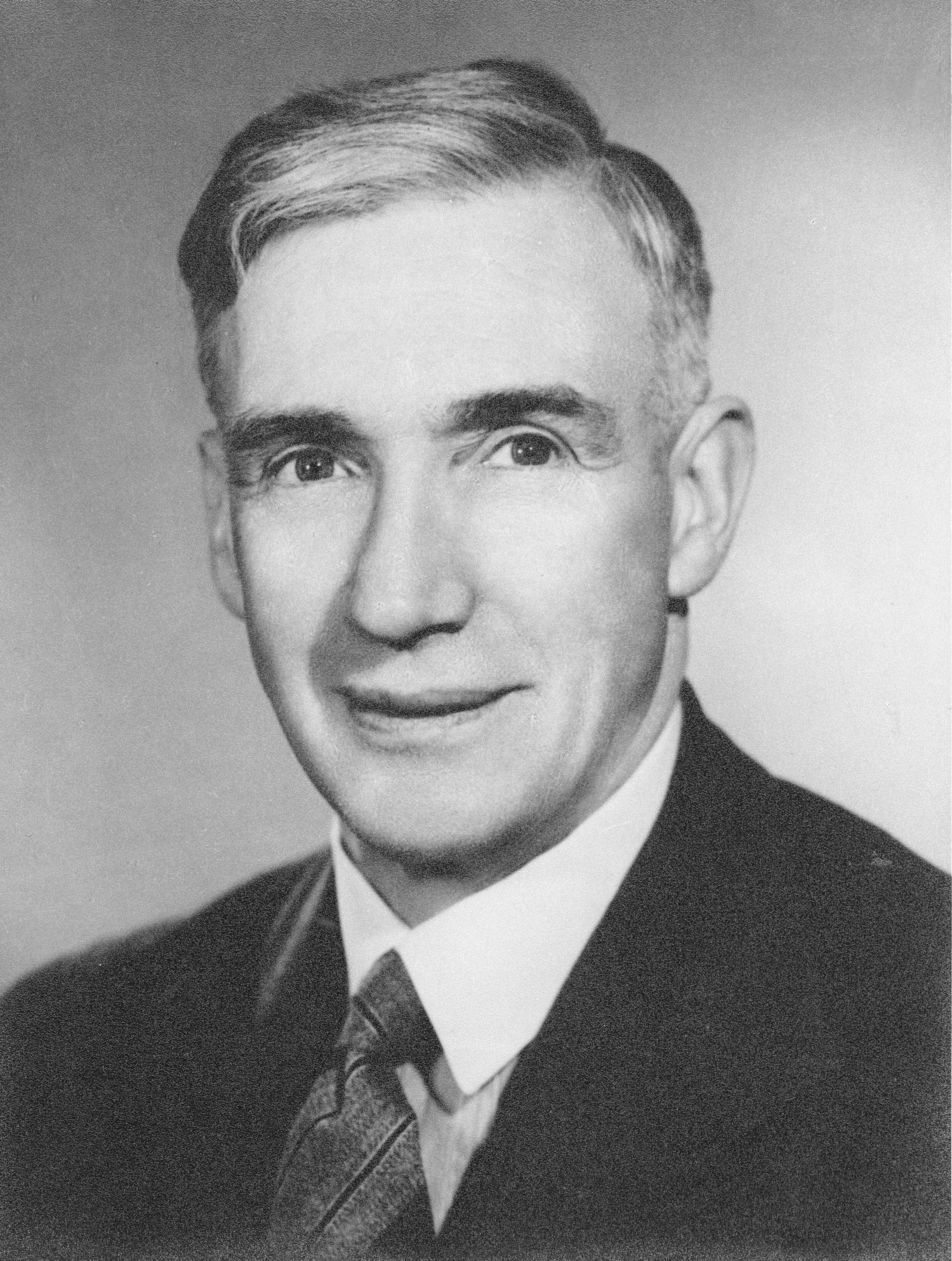
William Slater, Australia's first Ambassador to Moscow in 1942

After the defeat of the White Army in the Russian Civil War in 1922, the United Kingdom recognised the Soviet Union as the legitimate successor of the Russian Empire in 1924. Following the outbreak of the Second World War and the land invasion of the Soviet Union by Nazi Germany, the Labor government of John Curtin began to discuss the opening of diplomatic relations with the Soviet Union. The Congress of Friendship and Aid to the Soviet, a body created by the NSW Aid Russia Committee, requested, among other requests of aid and support, the posting of Australian diplomats to the Soviet Union. In May, 1942, Dr H.V. Evatt, the Australian Foreign Minister and Attorney General began backdoor negotiations in London with the Soviet People's Commissar for Foreign Affairs, Vyacheslav Molotov for the establishment of formal relations between the two nations and the exchange of representatives. Despite this, there were no official bilateral relations between the Soviet Union and Australia until 1942, where the Labor government of John Curtin appointed William Slater as a diplomatic representative of Australia to the Soviet Union. On 2 January 1943, Australia opened the Australian Legation in Kuybyshev, the temporary seat of the Russian government due to the ongoing invasion of the Soviet Union by the Axis powers. The legation then moved to Moscow on 12 August 1943. The legation was upgraded to the status of embassy on 16 February 1948.

=== Expulsion (1954–1991) ===
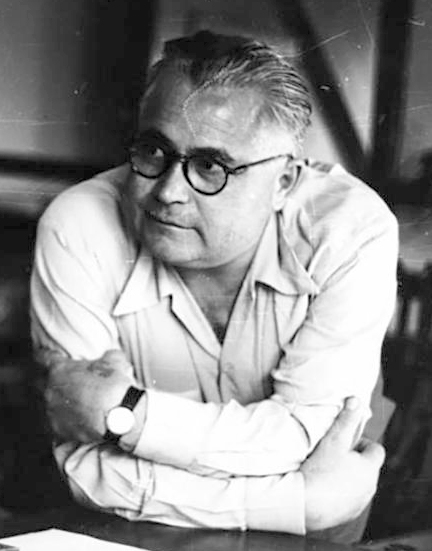
Vladimir Petrov in 1954

On 3 April 1954, Vladimir Petrov, the third secretary of the Soviet Embassy in Canberra defected at the end of his three-year appointment, fearing execution for his association with former head of the NKVD Lavrentiy Beria. The Australian Security Intelligence Organisation assisted with his defection and Australia granted Petrov (and later his wife) political asylum in Australia. The Australian government refused to turn over Petrov to the Soviets, and in retaliation on 23 April the Soviet government severed diplomatic relations with the Australia, including closing the Australian Embassy in Moscow. The embassy was given "two or three days" to leave the Soviet Union and the forty-eight embassy staff and their families were forced to board overnight trains from Moscow to Helsinki, Finland.

In this period, Australian diplomatic representation was provided by the United Kingdom's Embassy in Moscow. Relations between the Soviet Union and Australia were re-established on 13 March 1959 and the Australian Embassy in Moscow was reopened that year. The newly reopened Australian Embassy in Moscow was placed under chargé d'affaires, a temporary situation where the head of post of an embassy is not the official ambassador to the host nation and is instead only the Chief of Mission of the embassy itself. This situation was rectified by 29 July 1960 with the appointment of Sir John Keith Waller as the Australian ambassador to the Soviet Union.

Relations between Australia and the Soviet Union were seen as stronger in this period than they were previously. On 3 July 1974, the Labor government of Gough Whitlam decided to grant the de jure recognition of the incorporation of the Baltic states of Estonia, Latvia and Lithuania into the Soviet Union. The Australian ambassador to Moscow subsequently visited Tallinn, Estonia, in an effort to legitimise the move by the Whitlam government. This recognition was rescinded in 1975 by the Liberal-National government of Malcolm Fraser.

Between the reopening of the embassy to the Soviet Union and the collapse of the Soviet Union, the embassy frequently provided foreign affairs assistance to the Australian Government. An example of this is the Australian Government's protest over the treatment of Russian nuclear physicist Andrei Sakharov. Sakharov was arrested by the Soviets in 1980 for publicly protesting over the Soviet invasion of Afghanistan. In 1984, when his wife was refused permission to travel to the United States for heart surgery, he began a four-month hunger strike in prison leading to his isolation in prison and authorities force-feeding Sakharov. In response to this, the Australian Government pressured the Soviet Government to release Sakharov from exile and allow his wife to travel abroad. The embassy and Australian ambassador to the Soviet Union raised the issue with Soviet authorities on multiple occasions following the Australian Government's official condemnation of the situation on 30 May 1984.

=== Russian Federation (1991–present) ===
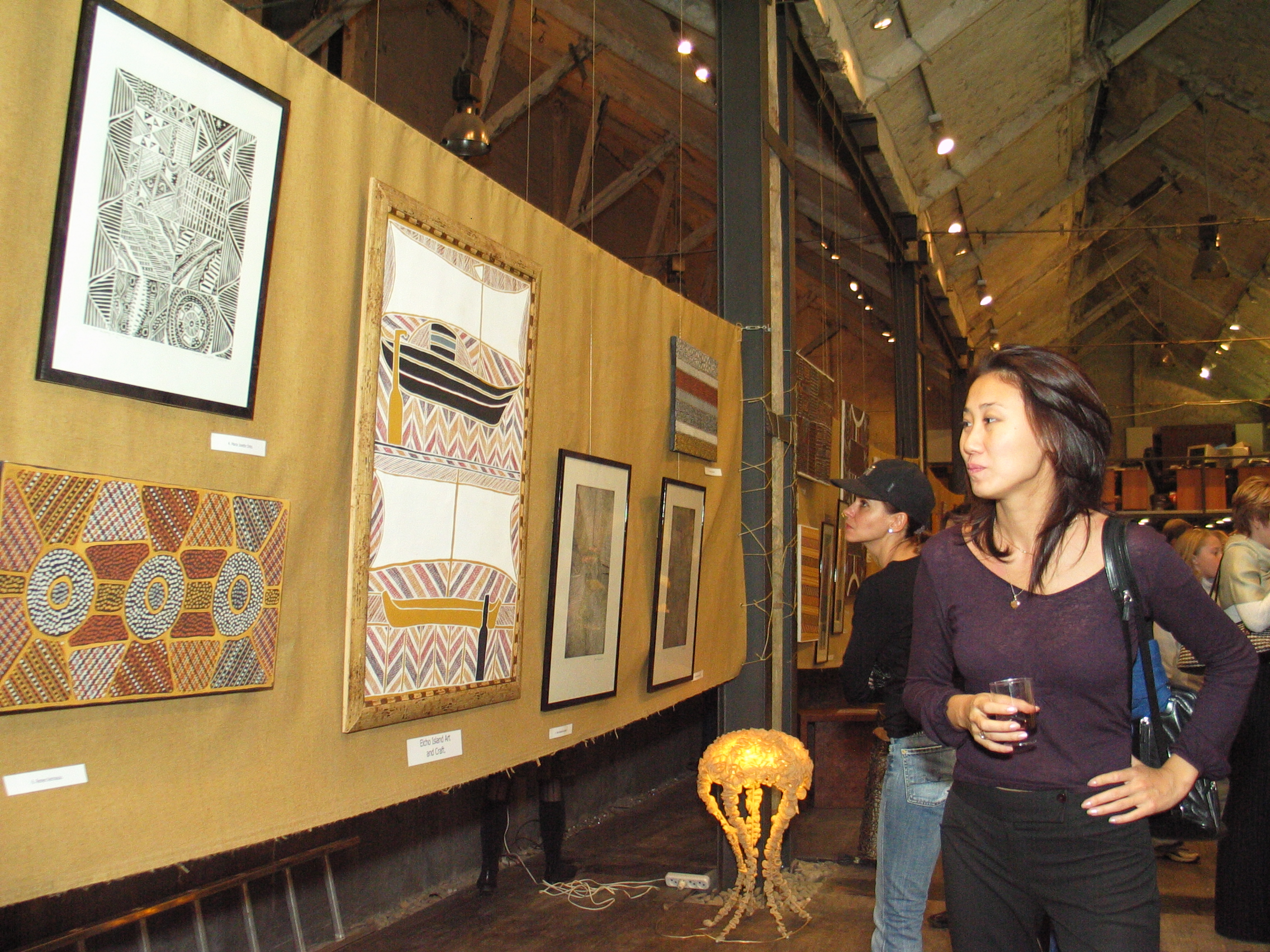
Exhibition of Indigenous Australian artwork on display at the Embassy in Moscow

Australia recognised the Russian Federation as the legitimate successor state to the Soviet Union on 26 December 1991 and the Australian Embassy in Moscow serves as the ambassadorial posting for Australia in Russia. As a result of the dissolution of the Soviet Union, the embassy ceased services to the Baltic states of Estonia, Lithuania, and Latvia, with these nations now being served by their own consulates. In 2002, the Australian Foreign Minister, Alexander Downer opened the current chancery and announced the opening of a second diplomatic mission in Saint Petersburg, Russia.

The embassy also used to provide diplomatic and consular service with Ukraine until the Australian Government opened a permanent embassy in Kyiv, Ukraine in November 2014.

== Modern usage ==
Green: Nations currently serviced by the embassy. Red: Nations formerly serviced by the embassy.

The embassy currently provides services diplomatic relations with Russia, Armenia, Belarus, Kazakhstan, Kyrgyzstan, Tajikistan, Turkmenistan and Uzbekistan. The embassy is broken into three sections: political, consular, and Austrade.

The political section of the embassy is headed by the deputy head of mission and is tasked with advancing the bilateral relations between Australia and the countries the embassy is tasked with servicing.

The consular section of the embassy is headed by the Consul and Senior Administrative Officer and is tasked with providing consular support to Australians living in any of the countries that the embassy services. These services include legal advice, provision of Australian passports, enabling Australians overseas to vote, provision of notarial services and providing details of local doctors and hospitals in the event of medical emergencies for Australians living or holidaying in countries services.

The Austrade section of the embassy is headed by the Senior Trade Commissioner and is tasked with the establishing and maintaining of business and investment links between Australia and countries serviced. This includes promoting Australian education to prospective students in the region, providing business assistance for Australian exporters operating in the region and the marketing of Australian industry to businesses operating in the region.

Due to the impact of COVID-19, many of the embassy's normal functions (including the issuing of passports and the provision of notarial services) have been suspended.

== Head of post ==
The head of post of the embassy is typically also the Ambassador of Australia to the Russian Federation (previously the Soviet Union). Since the establishment of official diplomatic relations with the Soviet Union in 1942, there have been a total of 24 Ambassadors. Of these, only five have not held the role of Ambassador and held the post under chargé d'affaires.

The current head of post is Ambassador John Geering.

Australian ambassadors to the Russian Federation hold resident accreditation to the Russian Federation, as well as non-resident accreditation to the Republics of Armenia, Belarus, Kazakhstan, Moldova (not a nation serviced by the embassy, instead serviced by the Australian Embassy in Kyiv, Ukraine), Tajikistan and Uzbekistan, the Kyrgyz Republic and Turkmenistan. This non-resident accreditation means that the role of the Ambassador to Russia also serves in the role of non-resident Ambassador to these nations indirectly.

In June 2020, the ambassador signed a joint statement with top diplomatic officials from other western nations condemning the Russian Federation's treatment of members of the LGBTQI+ community within Russia.

== Consulates ==
In addition to the embassy in Moscow, the Australian Government also maintains consulates in Almaty, Kazakhstan, Saint Petersburg, Russia and Vladivostok, Russia, each with their own honorary consuls. The consulate in Almaty, Kazakhstan is located at Esentai Tower, 77/7 Al-Farabi Avenue, Almaty (Kazakh: Есентай мұнарасы, Әл-Фараби даңғылы, 77/7) and was originally established as an embassy to Kazakhstan in 1995. However, the embassy was closed in 1999 by the Australian government due to "resource constraints". The consulate in Saint Petersburg, Russia is located at 11 Moika Street, Saint Petersburg (Russian: Улица Мойки, 11). Its opening was announced in 2002 and it continues to provide consular support today. The consulate in Vladivostok, Russia is located at 42 Prospect Krasnogo Znameni, Vladivostok (Russian: проспект Красного Знамени, 42).

These consulates are able to provide visa and passport processing as well as visa legitimisation, however, the services that the consulates may provide are limited in scope. As such, most notary services as well as passport applications are typically conducted through the embassy in Moscow.

== See also ==
- Australia–Russia relations
- Diplomatic missions of Australia
- Diplomatic missions in Russia
- List of Ambassadors of Australia to Russia
- Petrov Affair
