= Daria Varlamova =

Australian pageant winner

- Born: Brjansk, Russia

Daria Varlamova is a Russian-Australian media personality and pageant titleholder who was crowned Miss Universe Australia 2021 and represented Australia at the Miss Universe 2021 contest in Eilat, Israel.

== Early life ==
Varlamova was born in Brjansk, Russia and migrated to Perth, Western Australia in 2002.

== Career ==
Varlamova was crowned Miss Universe Australia in October 2021.

In May 2022, Varlamova was named the first official ambassador for Special Olympics Australia. She attended and spoke at the Special Olympics Australia National Games in 2022, which were held in Launceston, Tasmania.

== Personal life ==
Varlamova lives in Melbourne, Australia.
