= Australia–Russia relations =

- Australia: Russia

Diplomatic mission
- Embassy of Australia, Moscow: Embassy of Russia, Canberra

Envoy
- Ambassador John Geering: Ambassador Aleksey Pavlovsky

Foreign relations between Australia and Russia (Russian: Российско-австралийские отношения) date back to 1807, when the Russian warship Neva arrived in Sydney as part of its circumnavigation of the globe. Consular relations between Australia and the Russian Empire were established in 1857. Diplomatic relations between Australia and the Soviet Union were established in 1942, and the first Australian embassy opened in 1943. Due to the 2022 Russian invasion of Ukraine, relations became very tense after Australia imposed sanctions against Russia. Russia placed Australia on a list of "unfriendly countries", along with Ukraine, the United States, European Union members, NATO members (except Turkey), New Zealand, Singapore, Japan, Switzerland, Micronesia, Canada, Taiwan, and South Korea.

Relations between the two countries severely deteriorated in 2014 due to Russia's invasion of Crimea and the downing of Malaysia Airlines Flight 17, which claimed the lives of 38 Australians. In 2017, according to a Pew Research Center survey, 37% of Australians had a favourable view of Russia, with 55% expressing an unfavourable view. Relations further deteriorated in 2022 as a result of Russia's full-scale invasion of Ukraine. At the time, a Lowy Institute study reported that only 5% of surveyed Australians said that they trust Russia ‘somewhat’ or ‘a great deal’ to act responsibly in the world, a 21-point fall from 2021.

== Pre-Russian Federation relations ==
=== Russian Empire ===
==== 1803–1898 ====
Peter the Great was familiar with New Holland through his connections with the Dutch, and the Empire in the 18th century tried several times, unsuccessfully, to reach the Australian continent.

Contacts between Russia and Australia date back to 1803, when Secretary of State for the Colonies Lord Hobart wrote to Governor of New South Wales Philip Gidley King in relation to the first Russian circumnavigation of the globe by Adam Johann von Krusenstern and Yuri Lisyansky. As the Russian and British empires were allies in the war against Napoleon, the Russian warship Neva, with Captain Ludwig von Hagemeister at the helm, was able to sail into Port Jackson on 16 June 1807. Hagemeister and the ship's officers were extended the utmost courtesy by Governor William Bligh, with the Governor inviting the Russians to Government House for dinner and a ball.

This was the beginning of personal contacts between Russians and Australians, and Russian ships would continue to visit Australian shores, particularly as a stop on their way to supplying the Empire's North American colonies. Suvorov commanded by Captain Mikhail Lazarev spent twenty-two days in New South Wales in 1814, when it brought news of Napoleon's defeat, and this was followed up by the 1820 visit of Otkrytiye and Blagonamerenny. In 1820, Fabian Gottlieb von Bellingshausen and Mikhail Vasilyev arrived in New South Wales, on board Antarctic research ships Vostok and Mirny, under the command of Mikhail Lazarev. Bellingshausen returned to Sydney after discovering Antarctica, spending the winter at the invitation of Governor Lachlan Macquarie. Macquarie played the greatest role in the expression of Russophilia in the Colony, ensuring that the Russian visitors were made to feel welcome.

While in Sydney, Bellingshausen collected information on the colony, which he published in Russia as Short Notes on the Colony of New South Wales. He wrote that Schmidt, a naturalist who was attached to the Lazarev expedition, discovered gold near Hartley, making him the first person to discover gold in Australia. While in Sydney, on 27 March 1820, officials from the colony were invited on board Vostok to celebrate Orthodox Easter, marking the first time that a Russian Orthodox service was held in the Australian colonies.

Although Russia and Britain were allies against Napoleon, the capture of Paris in 1814 by the Imperial Russian Army caused consternation with the British in relation to Tsar Alexander's intention of expanding Russian influence which would compete with Britain's own imperial ambitions. Further visits to the Colony of New South Wales in 1823 by Rurik and Apollon, along with the 1824 visits by Ladoga and Kreiser, caused concern with the colony authorities, who reported their concerns to London. In 1825 and 1828, Elena visited Australia followed by Krotky in 1829, Amerika in 1831 and 1835. Visits by Russian ships became so common in Sydney Cove that their place of mooring near Neutral Bay became known as Russian Point, which added to the sense of alarm in the Colonies.

By the late 1830s, relations between Russia and Britain had deteriorated, and in 1841 the Government of New South Wales decided to establish fortification at Fort Denison in order to repel a feared Russian invasion. Fortifications at Queenscliff, Portsea, and Mud Islands in Melbourne's Port Philip Bay followed, as did similar structures on the Tamar River near Launceston and on the banks of the Derwent River at Sandy Bay and Hobart.

As Australia was engaged in a gold rush in the 1840s and 1850s, in conjunction with the Crimean War between the UK and Russia, paranoia of a Russian invasion gripped the Colony, and Russophobia increased. In 1855, the Colony built fortifications around Admiralty House and completed Fort Denison, as the emergence of the Pacific Ocean Fleet of the Imperial Russian Navy furthered the fear of a Russian invasion of the Colonies, and rumours spread that the Russians had invaded the Port of Melbourne. Inflows of Russians and Russian-speaking immigrants which began to increase in the 1850s, and the nature of friendly relations between Russian and Australian representatives, led to the appointment of two Russian honorary consuls in 1857; James Damyon in Melbourne and EM Paul in Sydney.

Seven years after the conclusion of the Crimean War, the Russian corvette, and flagship of the Russian Pacific squadron, Bogatyr visited Melbourne and Sydney in 1863. The corvette visited the cities on a navigational drill under the Commander of the Russian Pacific Fleet Rear Admiral Andrey Alexandrovich Popov, and the ship and crew were welcomed with warmth. Popov paid Governor of Victoria Henry Barkly and Governor of New South Wales John Young protocol visits, and they in turn visited the Russian ship. The Russians opened the ship for public visitation in Melbourne, and more than 8,000 Australians visited the ship over a period of several days. The goodwill visit was a success, but Bogatyr's appearance in Melbourne did put the city on a war footing, as noted in The Argus which reported that the ship managed to approach Melbourne unnoticed, ostensibly due to the lack of naval forces in Port Phillip Bay. After Bogatyr had left the Colony, the Sydney Morning Herald reported on 7 April 1863 that the crew of the ship had engaged in topographical surveys of the Port Jackson and Botany Bay areas, which included investigating coastal fortifications, but this did not raise any eyebrows at the time.

Anti-Russian sentiment in Australia began to take hold in the Australian media in November 1864 after the publication by The Times in London of an article which asserted that the Colonies were on the edge of a Russian invasion. The article, published on 17 September 1864, stated that Rear Admiral Popov received instructions from the Russian Naval Minister to raid Melbourne in the event there was a Russo-British war, but noted that such a plan was unlikely due to its perception of the Russian forces being inadequate for such an attack. Australian newspapers, including The Age and Argus, took The Times' claims more seriously and began to write on the need to increase defence capabilities to protect against the threat of a Russian invasion. On 11 May 1870, the corvette Boyarin appeared at the Derwent River and rumours spread in Hobart that a Russian invasion was almost a certainty. The reason for the appearance of the Russian warship was humanitarian in nature; the ship's purser was ill and Captain Serkov gained permission to hospitalise Grigory Belavin and remain in port for two weeks to replenish supplies and give the crew opportunity for some shore leave. The ship's officers were guests at the Governor's Ball held in honour of the birthday of Queen Victoria, and The Mercury noted that the officers were gallant and spoke three languages including English and French. The following day a parade was held, and the crew of Boyarin raised the Union Jack on its mast and fired a 21-gun salute in honour to the British queen. This was reciprocated by the town garrison which raised the Russian Naval flag of Saint Andrew and fired a salute in honour of Tsar Alexander II. After the death of Belavin, permission was given to bury him on shore, and his funeral saw the attendance of thousands of Hobart residents, and the locals donated funds to provide for a headstone on his grave. In gratitude of the welcome and care given by the Hobart citizenry, Captain Serkov presented the city with two mortars from the ship, which still stand at the entrance to the Anglesea Barracks. When Boyarin left Hobart on 12 June, a military band onshore played God Save the Tsar, and the ship's crew replied by playing God Save the Queen.

Although the visits of Russian ships were of a friendly nature, the Russo-Turkish War of 1877–1878 was seen by Britain as part of a potential expansion plan by the Russian Empire into India, and the Australian colonies were advised to upgrade their defence capabilities. The inadequacy of defences in the colony was seen in 1862, when Svetlana sailed into Port Phillip Bay and the fort built had no gunpowder for its cannons to use to return a salute. William Jervois, a Royal Engineer, was commissioned to determine the defence capabilities of all colonies, with the exception of Western Australia. In his report, he was convinced that the Russian Empire would to attack South Australian shipping in an attempt to destroy the local economy. As a result of Jervois' report, Fort Glanville and Fort Largs were built to protect Port Adelaide. The "Russian threat" and Russophobia continued to permeate in Australian society, and were instrumental in the decision to build Australia's first true warships, HMS Acheron and HMS Avernus, in 1879.

The Melbourne-based Epoch re-ignited fears of a Russia invasion when three Russian ships—Afrika, Vestnik, and Platon—were sighted near Port Phillip in January 1882. Despite the hysteria generated by the media in Melbourne, no invasion ensued. David Syme, the proprietor of The Age, wrote in a series of editorials that the visit of the three ships was associated with a war that was threatening to engulf Britain and Russia, and that the squadron under the command of Avraamy Aslanbegov was in the Pacific in order to raid British commerce. Newspapers wrote that Admiral Aslanbegov behaved like a varnished barbarian due to his non-acceptance of invitations, and because he preferred to stay at the Menzies Hotel, rather than the Melbourne Club or the Australian Club. Aslanbegov was accused of spying and fraud, leading to the Admiral complaining to the Premier of Victoria Bryan O'Loghlen and threatening legal action against the newspaper. John Wodehouse, 1st Earl of Kimberley, the British Secretary of State for the Colonies, defused the situation when he sent a telegram to the government stating that relations with Russia are of a friendly character, and such newspaper reports are rendered incredible. Due to the fears of an invasion, Fort Scratchley in Newcastle was completed by 1885.

Nicholai Miklukho-Maklai after conducting ethnographic research in New Guinea since 1871 moved to the Australian colonies in 1878, where he worked on William John Macleay's zoological collection in Sydney and set up Australia's first marine biological station in 1881. Since 1883 he advocated setting up a Russian protectorate on the Maclay Coast in New Guinea, and noted his ideas of Russian expansionism in letters to those in power in Saint Petersburg. In a letter he wrote to N. V. Kopylov in 1883, he noted there was a mood of expansionism in Australia, particularly towards New Guinea and the islands in Oceania. He also wrote to Tsar Alexander III in December 1883 that due to the lack of a Russian sphere of influence in the South Pacific and British domination in the region, there was a threat to Russian supremacy in the North Pacific. This view was mirrored in a letter to Konstantin Pobedonostsev, and he expressed his willingness to provide assistance in pursuing Russian interests in the region. Nicholas de Giers, the Russian Foreign Minister, suggested in reports to the Tsar that relations with Miklukho-Maklai should be maintained because of his familiarity with political and military issues in the region, while not advising him of any plans on the Government's plans for the region. This opinion was mirrored by the Naval Ministry. In total, three reports were sent to Russia by Miklukho-Maklai, containing information on the growth of anti-Russian sentiment and the buildup of the military in Australia, which correlated with the worsening of Anglo-Russian relations. Noting the establishment of coal bunkers and the fortifying of ports in Sydney, Melbourne, and Adelaide, he advocated taking over Port Darwin, Thursday Island, Newcastle, and Albany, noting their insufficient fortification. The Foreign Ministry considered a Russian colony in the South Pacific as unlikely and military notes of the reports were only partially utilised by the Naval Ministry. The authorities in Russia appraised his reports, and in December 1886 de Giers officially advised Miklukho-Maklai that his request for the establishment of a Russian colony had been declined. Around this time, Russia was also using the island of Sakhalin in the North Pacific as a penal colony, garnering comparisons to Britain's usage of Australia as a penal colony.

==== 1888–1917 ====
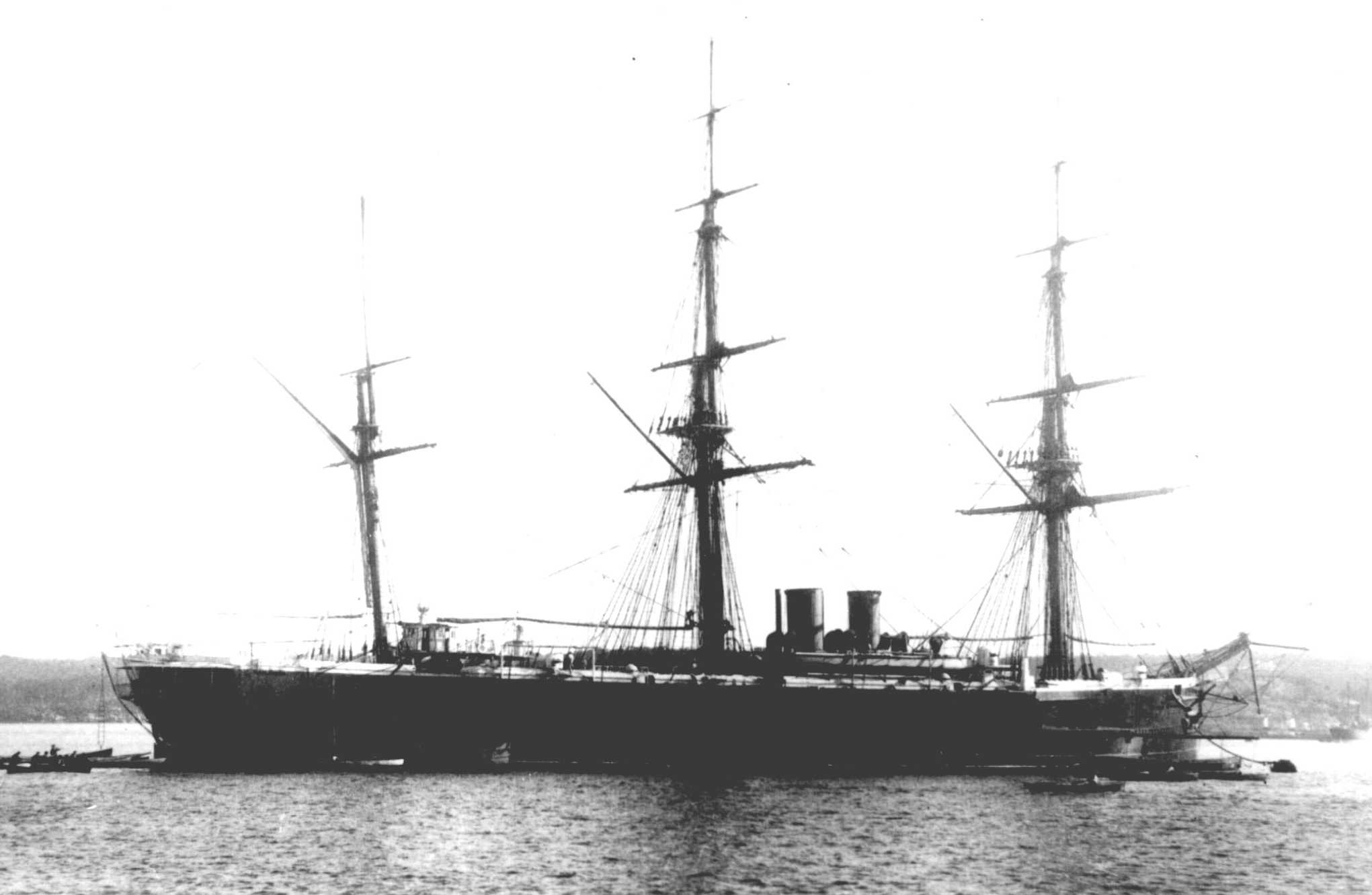
The Russian corvette Rynda in Sydney in 1888.

Paranoia of a Russian invasion subsided in 1888, when Grand Duke Alexander Mikhailovich arrived in the Colony on board the corvette Rynda as part of celebrations of the Colonial centenary. Rynda pulled into Newcastle in the afternoon of 19 January 1888 to replenish coal supplies, becoming the first Russian naval visitor to the city. The Newcastle Morning Herald and Miners' Advocate reported on 20 January 1888 that given the uncertain state of diplomatic relations between the European powers many people fled fearing that the Russian warship was present in Newcastle to start a war; however, those fears were quickly allayed when the goodwill nature of the visit became known. From Newcastle, Rynda sailed to Sydney. The day after arrival Lord Carrington, the Governor of New South Wales, sent a coach to bring the Grand Duke to Government House. He was unable to attend due to laws of the Russian Empire which prohibited participation in State ceremonies of foreign states. The Russian officers attended Government House on 24 January as the guest of Lady Carrington. HMS Nelson was late arriving in Sydney and on 26 January, the day of celebrations, the Rynda orchestra was invited to entertain the public, and the Australian media made the Grand Duke the central focus of the events. On 30 January the Russian officers were present at the ceremony of the foundation of the new parliament building. One hundred seamen from Rynda were invited to a festival organised by the citizens of Sydney on 31 January, and the Russian and French flags were given prominence next to the Australian flag, whilst those of other nations were along the walls. Denoting the goodwill nature of the visit, Lord Carrington in a speech said, "We welcome into the waters of Port Jackson the gallant ship Rynda, we welcome the gallant sailors who sail under the blue cross of Saint Andrew, and we especially welcome — though we are not permitted to do so in official manner – that distinguished officer who is on board, a close blood-relation of his Majesty the Tsar. Though not permitted to offer him an official welcome, we offer him a right royal welcome with all our hearts." Rynda left Sydney on 9 February and arrived in Melbourne on 12 February. The visit was initially reported positively in the press, but after a few days The Age began to campaign for restricting the entry of foreign naval ships into Melbourne, and other articles described the expected war between "semi-barbarous and despotic Russia" and England. The public, however, continued to view the presence of the Russians positively, and on 22 February the Mayor of Melbourne Benjamin Benjamin visited the ships. After staying for nearly a month, Rynda left Melbourne on 6 March for New Zealand. The Grand Duke supported expanding trade ties with Australia, noting that it was desirable for the Russians to expand their ties with Australia, outside of their relationship with Britain, and stated his belief that such relations were long overdue.

In 1890, the Government in Saint Petersburg concluded Anglo-Russian relations in the Pacific to have become important enough to appoint a career diplomat to represent Russian interests in the Australian colonies. When John Jamison, the Russian honorary consul in Melbourne, went bankrupt and was no longer able to represent Russia's interests, the Russian government appointed Alexey Poutyata as the first Imperial Russian Consul to the Colonies on 14 July 1893, and he arrived with his family in Melbourne on 13 December 1893. Poutyata was an effective Consul and his reports were well read in Saint Petersburg. His efforts at encouraging Australian manufacturers and merchants to attend the All-Russia Exhibition 1896 in Nizhny Novgorod were instrumental in the signing of commercial contracts between Tasmanian merchants and manufacturers in Russia. Poutyata died of kidney failure following complications from pneumonia a little over a year after his arrival in Australia on 16 December 1894, which saw Robert Ungern von Sternberg being appointed to replace him at the end of 1895. Nikolai Matyunin, who replaced Sternberg as Consul in 1898, signed an agreement with Dalgety Australia Ltd, which enabled Russian cargo ships to carry the company's pastoral products back to Europe.

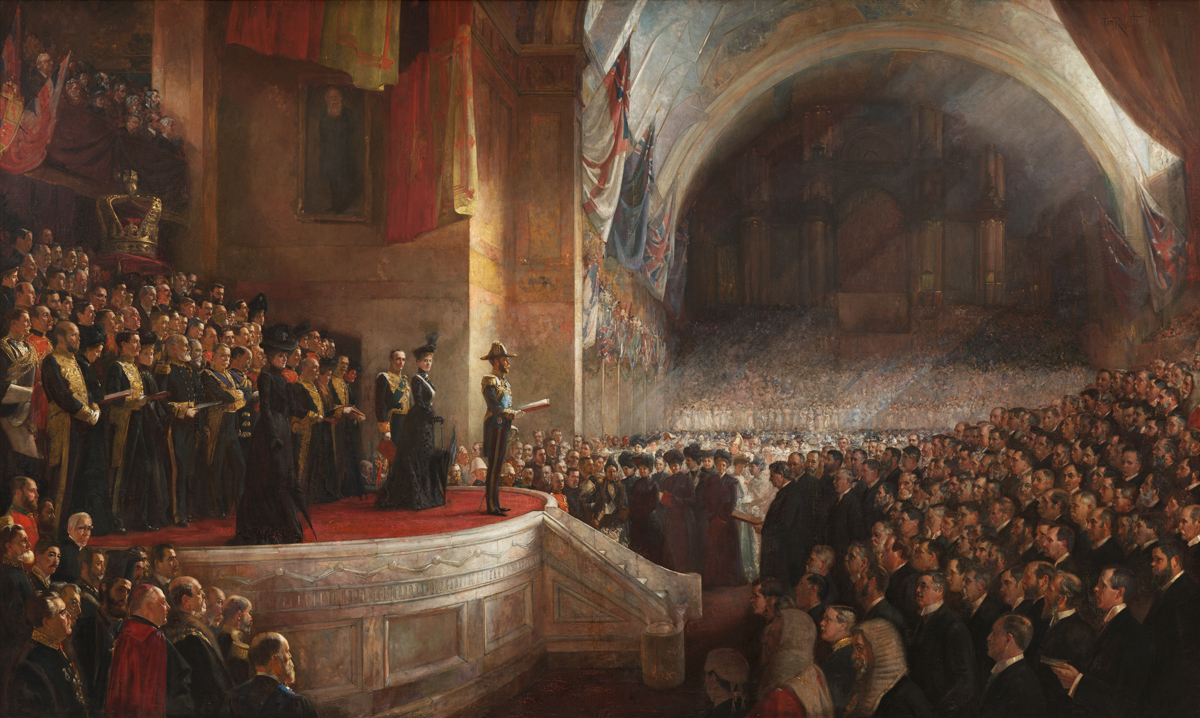
The opening of the Australian Parliament on 9 May 1901 at which the Russian Empire was represented by Nicolai Passek, the Imperial Consul in Melbourne. (figure shown in far bottom left of image)

In 1900, the Imperial Ministry of Foreign Affairs was advised that the Duke and Duchess of York (later George V and Queen Mary) would be visiting Australia for the opening of the Australian Federal Parliament in 1901, whereupon it was viewed as necessary to send a Russian naval vessel, and Gromoboi, captained by Karl Jessen, was ordered to divert to Melbourne on 24 February [O.S. 11 February] 1901. On 1 March [O.S. 16 February] 1901, the Russian Minister of Foreign Affairs Vladimir Lambsdorff wrote to the Naval Minister, advising him that sending a ship was not a political act but one of diplomatic etiquette. Tsar Nicholas II viewed that "[i]t is desirable to send a cruiser". Gromoboi arrived in Melbourne, after a call in Albany in the Great Southern region of Western Australia, on 30 April 1901. The Russian Empire was represented at the opening of the first Australian Parliament on 1 May 1901 by Russian consul Nicolai Passek, who was based in Melbourne since the approval of his appointment by Queen Victoria on 24 March 1900. The Duke of York visited Gromoboi and was impressed by the cruiser, and he sent a request to Tsar Nicholas II asking that Jessen and Gromoboi be allowed to accompany him to Sydney as an honour escort; a request which was approved.

British financial and political support for the Japanese during the Russo-Japanese War in 1904–1905 caused disagreement with the British foreign policy in Australia. The authorities in Australia were concerned that the Japanese military posed a threat to the national security of the country, and the fear existed even when Japan was an ally of the Entente Powers in World War I. During the war, as a member of the British Empire, Australia was allied with Russia.

=== Soviet Union ===
==== 1917–1941 ====
After the February Revolution of 1917 in Russia, which led to the abdication of Tsar Nicholas II, the Consul-General of Russia for the Commonwealth of Australia and for the Dominion of New Zealand, Alexander Nikolayevich Abaza, expressed his support for the Russian Provisional Government and was instrumental in raising funds to repatriate Russians in Australia back to Russia after 500 expatriates petitioned Alexander Kerensky. Abaza wrote to Prime Minister William Hughes on 24 December 1917: "During whatever time I may act here nominally as Consul-General for Russia I shall only represent those of my people who are absolutely faithful to the Allies." Australia saw the Bolshevik signing of the Treaty of Brest-Litovsk with Germany after the October Revolution to be an act of treachery towards the Allies, and put a halt to migration from Australia to Russia. With the onset of the Russian Civil War, British intervention in the war saw many Australians serving in the British army in the Russian North and Central Asia in support of the White Army. On Australia Day (26 January) in 1918, Abaza wrote to the Prime Minister, advising him conditions made his commission in Melbourne untenable, and that he would be resigning as Consul-General as of the following day. His resignation was followed by the resignation of Vice-Consuls in Hobart, Perth, Darwin, Newcastle, Port Pirie and Melbourne.

In March 1918, after the resignation of Abaza, Peter Simonov presented himself to the Australian government as the representative of the Bolshevik government in Australia, and asked for recognition as the new Russian Consul. Given the signing of the Treaty of Brest-Litovsk he was advised that the Australian government did not recognise the Bolsheviks, and would not recognise him as Consul. Aware of Simonov's connections with Australian left-wing revolutionary groups, the Australian government repeatedly rejected calls for his recognition as the representative of the Soviet Union in Australia, and barred Simonov from teaching Bolshevism politics in Australia; an act for which he was later imprisoned for six months. Michael Considine, Member of the House of Representatives for Barrier assumed the unrecognised role of representative of the Soviets. Anti-Russian sentiment became stronger during this period, and was exemplified by the March 1919 anti-Bolshevik demonstrations in Brisbane, which were dubbed the Red Flag Riots, and until the United Kingdom's recognition of the Soviet Union in 1924, bilateral relations between Australia and the Soviet Union continued to be de jure non-existent.

On 8 August 1924, the United Kingdom signed the General Treaty with the Soviet Union which extended British diplomatic recognition to the USSR, and was also considered applicable to the British dominions of Canada, New Zealand, the Union of South Africa, the Irish Free State, Newfoundland, and Australia. The Nationalist Prime Minister Stanley Bruce disputed the nature of the Treaty, saying that self-governing parts of the Empire were not consulted, it did not take into account Australia's rights to sign treaties with foreign countries and it ignored Australia's trade interests. Bruce was also concerned that allegations of the Soviet Union spreading propaganda in Australia, which regarded communism as a menace, were not addressed. The Treaty was not entered into as a treaty of George V on behalf of the Empire, but between two governments, and according to Bruce, Australia was in no way bound by the Treaty, and the Australian Press Association stated that there was initially an unsympathetic view in Australia towards restoring diplomatic relations with the Soviet Union. Izvestia reported Ramsay MacDonald had campaigned for Prime Minister of the United Kingdom on a platform which included restoring ties with the Soviet Union and hence the Soviet Union should seize upon this and "advance conditions and demand guarantees". In July 1929, Bruce sent a communication to MacDonald, acquiescing to the establishment of diplomatic relations with the Soviet Union, provided that Soviet propaganda ceased. It was the opinion of the Australian government that the Soviet Union had been spreading propaganda in Australia, but it was unable to provide specific evidence of this being the case. On 20 and 21 December 1929, notes were exchanged in Moscow and London which saw the resumption of diplomatic relations between the Soviet Union and the United Kingdom and its Dominions, including Australia. The notes included a pledge by the Soviet Union to refrain from hostile propaganda, which was part of the unratified 1924 Treaty.

==== 1941–1948 ====
After the German invasion of the Soviet Union on 22 June 1941 during World War II, the Labor government of John Curtin began to discuss sending a diplomatic delegation to the Soviet Union. The Congress of Friendship and Aid to the Soviet urged the posting of Australian diplomats in the Soviet Union, and also pushed for exchanging military, air and naval missions between the two countries. HMAS Norman in October 1941 visited Arkhangelsk bringing a British trade delegation from Iceland; marking the beginning of the Lend-Lease program in support of the Soviet Union.

H. V. Evatt, the Australian Minister for External Affairs on 4 November 1941 wrote in a secret submission to the war cabinet that the Government had received a large number of representations from interested parties since the outbreak of the Russo-German War, and that the major views in support of sending a diplomatic delegation to the Soviet Union included the necessity to provide material and moral support to the Soviet Union and to encourage its resistance against the Germans, the sharing of a common interest in policy towards Japan and the Middle East, and the potential for Australian-Soviet trade, and its importance to the Australian economy.

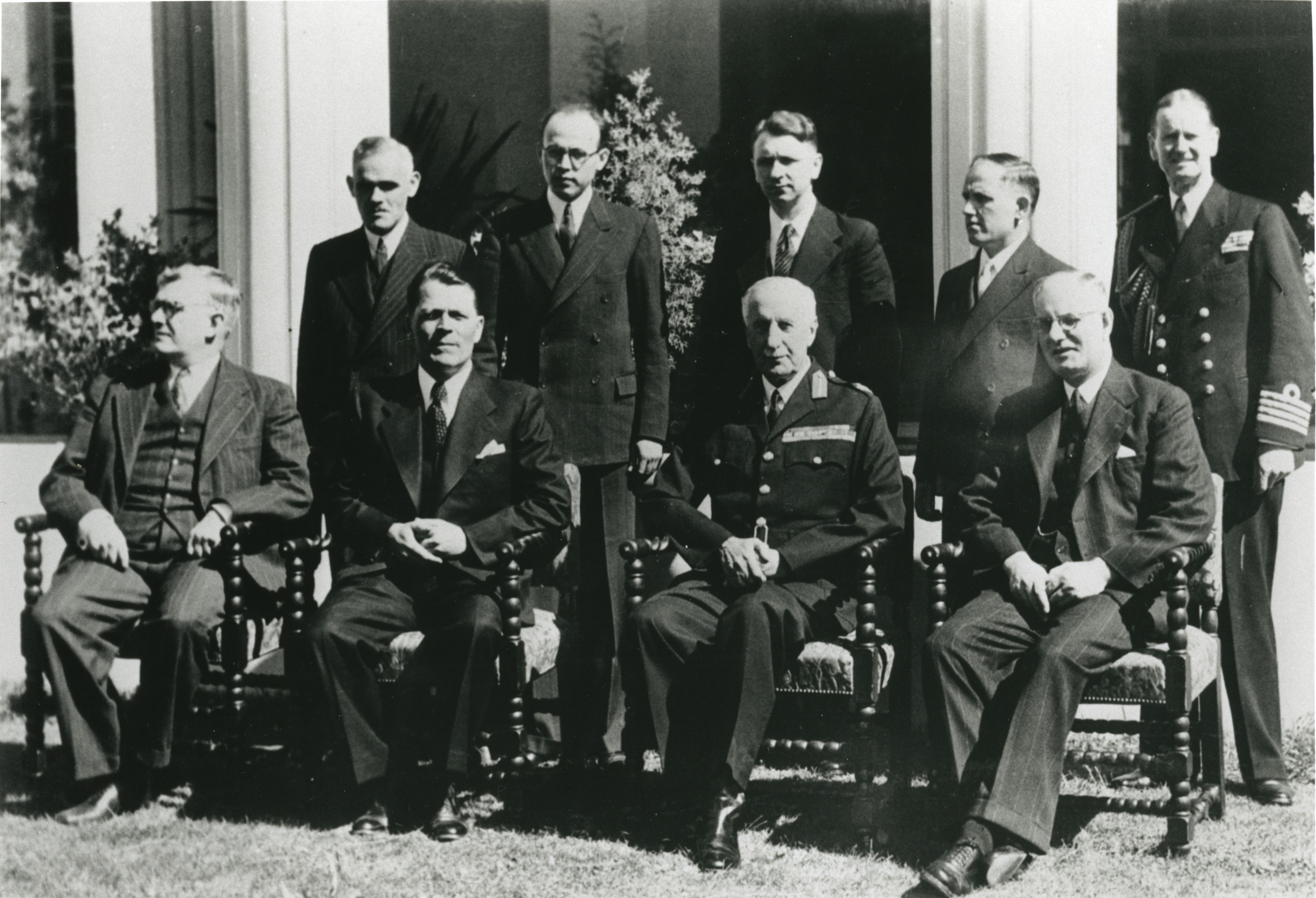
Soviet Ambassador Andrey Vlasov presents his credentials at Government House, Canberra, March 1943. Front (left to right): H. V. Evatt, Andrey Vlasov, Governor-General Lord Gowrie, Prime Minister John Curtin. Back (left to right): Lt-Col W. R. Hodgson (?), Soldatov (?), Schibatev (?), Karpunin, L. S. Bracegirdle.

Whilst Australia's reasons for the exchange of diplomatic missions were known, it was also understood that the Soviet government believed at first that the exchange would serve no great purpose, due to the minimal ties between the two countries, commercial or otherwise. Both countries acknowledged that if relations, particularly trade relations, were to become a reality that diplomatic relations would be required as a formality. Evatt began negotiations with Soviet People's Commissar for Foreign Affairs Vyacheslav Molotov in London in May 1942, and the 10 October 1942 agreement between the two countries to exchange diplomatic representatives was regarded in Australia as a diplomatic coup, given the Soviet Union's position as a great power in the Pacific region. The first diplomatic representatives were Andrey Vlasov for the Soviet Union, and William Slater for Australia.

In 1942–43, joint Commonwealth naval and air forces, under British commanders, were based in North Russia, while involved in convoys bringing supplies to the Soviet Union. For instance, under the code name Operation Orator, between August and November 1942, a British-Australian air wing – including 455 Squadron, Royal Australian Air Force, operated Handley Page Hampden torpedo bombers from bases near Murmansk, where they successfully deterred operations off North Cape by German battleships and cruisers.

Slater opened the Australian Legation in Kuybyshev, the temporary seat of the Soviet government, on 2 January 1943, and moved to Moscow on 12 August 1943. Vlasov arrived in Canberra on 5 March 1943 to head the Soviet Legation, and presented his Letters of Credence to Governor-General Lord Gowrie on 10 March 1943 at Government House. The Soviet Legation in Canberra was upgraded to Embassy status on 12 July 1945 and the Australian Legation in Moscow was upgraded on 16 February 1948.

==== 1948–1963 ====
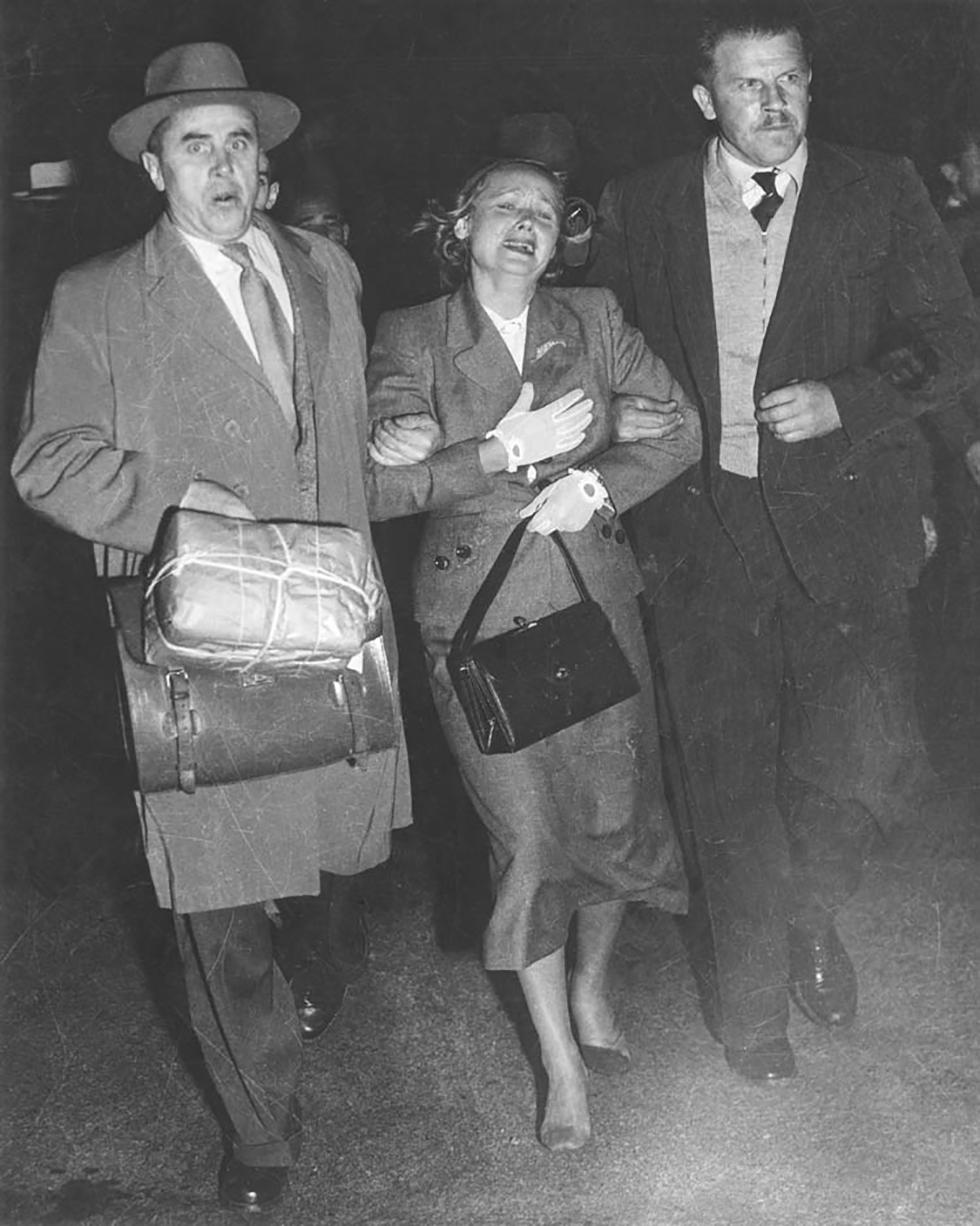
Evdokia Petrova being escorted by two Soviet diplomatic couriers at Sydney Airport.

As with other Western countries, Australia's relations with the USSR deteriorated in the late 1940s, as the Iron Curtain descended across Europe and Soviet proxy governments were established in several Eastern European countries. Australia was gripped in a red scare similar to that which led to McCarthyism in the United States.

During late 1948 and early 1949, the Australian government – like most of the former Western Allies – actively opposed a Soviet land blockade of West Berlin, and took part in the Berlin airlift. The RAAF Berlin Airlift Squadron was formed for this purpose. Following the outbreak of the Korean War in 1950, Australian and Soviet foreign policy were diametrically opposed. Australia was the first country after the United States to deploy forces to Korea, under what became known as United Nations Command.

Attempts by the new Liberal Prime Minister Robert Menzies to outlaw the Communist Party of Australia were overturned in the High Court of Australia (see Australian Communist Party v Commonwealth) and defeated at a referendum in 1951. Members on both sides of the Australian House of Representatives advocated severing diplomatic relations with the Soviet Union. Relations between Australia and the Soviet Union hit a low point when Vladimir Petrov, the Third Secretary of the Soviet embassy in Canberra, an associate and appointee of Lavrentiy Beria who feared execution if he returned to the Soviet Union, defected at the end of his three-year assignment on 3 April 1954 with the help of the Australian Security Intelligence Organisation and was given political asylum. The defection, which became known as the Petrov Affair, was disclosed by Menzies on 13 April 1954, the eve of the last day of Parliament before the May federal election. In his notice to Parliament Menzies disclosed that Petrov was an agent of the MVD and turned over to the Australian authorities details of Soviet intelligence operations in Australia, and announced intention for a Royal Commission to investigate Petrov's information, which included allegations of a Soviet fifth column being created in Australia. The revelations shocked the Australian public, which was more attuned to such things happening overseas. It was also reported that Evdokia Petrova, Petrov's wife and fellow MVD agent, had decided to stay with the Soviet Embassy in Canberra, and on 14 April, Petrova and Nikolai Generalov, the Soviet ambassador, accused Australian security services of kidnapping Petrov. On 19 April, the affair took another twist when Petrova was being escorted onto a waiting BOAC Constellation at Kingsford Smith Airport by Soviet diplomatic couriers for a flight back to the Soviet Union. William Wentworth took statutory declarations from Russian and Czechoslovak anti-communists in the crowd who had stormed the tarmac to prevent Petrova from leaving, that they had heard her say Petrova calling out in Russian "I do not want to go. Save me", and asked Menzies to make the aircraft stop at Darwin in order to ask Petrova whether she wanted to leave Australia. Contrary to reports, Petrova did not cry out for help at Sydney Airport, but the aircraft did stop at Darwin Airport on a scheduled fuel-stop, enabling Australian security services to interview Petrova. After talking to Reginald Sylvester Leydin, the Government secretary, and to her husband on the phone, Petrova accepted the Australian government's offer of asylum and defected. The Soviets accused the Menzies government of manufacturing the defection of Petrov as an election stunt, ostensibly to boost his support in the upcoming elections, and on 21 April they also levelled against Petrov charges that he had misappropriated Embassy funds. Menzies dismissed the allegations, stating that he was waiting for such charges to be levelled as they were in the Gouzenko case in Canada, and also went on to say he believed the charges contradicted the Soviets' initial allegation that Petrov was kidnapped. The Australian government refused to hand over Petrov, who was deemed by the Soviets to be a criminal, and the Soviet government responded on 23 April 1954 by severing diplomatic relations with Australia, which saw the Soviet Embassy in Canberra being recalled and the Australian Embassy in Moscow being expelled. The Soviet decision was not unexpected, as it was thought by the Australian government to have been one possible response, but the swiftness of the decision was said to have shocked government advisers. The severance of diplomatic relations led to rumours that the Soviet Olympic team would not compete at the 1956 Melbourne Olympics. In the absence of diplomatic relations, the Soviet Union's interests in Australia were represented by Sweden, and Australia's interests in the Soviet Union were represented by the United Kingdom.

In aid of Soviet preparations for its commitments to the International Geophysical Year on 29 August 1955 and in the absence of diplomatic relations, Australia sent the Soviets a note, via the British Embassy in Moscow, offering facilities in Australia for the use of the Soviets in the instance they were required. Australia wanted to keep the Soviets out of the Antarctic but wanted to avoid international condemnation for going against the spirit of the IGY. The Australians also used the note as a ruse, albeit an unsuccessful one, to force the Soviets to recognise the Australian Antarctic Territory and hence, Australian claims over parts of the Antarctic. The Lena arrived in Port Adelaide on 28 March 1956 after its journey to the Antarctic. The Soviets gave free public access to the ship during its stay, and among the first people to visit the ship and meet with the crew was Douglas Mawson. Australian naval intelligence exploited the situation and sent two civilian agents on board the ship while it was open to the public. It is unknown what information they would have obtained as the scientists on the ship openly shared their knowledge and demonstrated equipment to anybody who was interested, and allowed the public to wander around without obstruction. The Ob arrived in Adelaide on 21 April 1956 and was also visited by Mawson and others within the scientific community in Adelaide. The Ob was invited by the Australia–USSR Friendship Society and the Building Workers' Industrial Union to visit Melbourne and Sydney, respectively, and Mawson lobbied to have the visits go ahead, but permission was denied by Minister of External Affairs Richard Casey. The decision was criticised by Mawson, and he made note of the Commonwealth Scientific and Industrial Research Organisation losing an opportunity to view the latest oceanographic research technology.

The two countries agreed to resume diplomatic relations on 13 March 1959 and it was reported that Australia insisted on screening Soviet diplomatic personnel. The Soviet Embassy in Canberra reopened on 2 June 1959, but the Soviet Union did not have a permanent ambassador until mid-1962. On 7 February 1963 the Australian government declared First Secretary at the Soviet Embassy in Canberra Ivan Skripov persona non grata after he was accused by ASIO of being a spy. According to ASIO, Skripov recruited Kay Marshall, an ASIO agent, firstly by giving her small tasks to gauge her suitability as an agent. In December 1962 Skripov gave Marshall a package which she was to give to a contact in Adelaide, but the contact did not meet Marshall as planned. The package, which had already been inspected by ASIO, contained coded transmission timetables for a Soviet radio station, along with a high-speed message sender which could be attached to a radio transmitter. Two months later the Australian government produced photos of meetings between Skripov and Marshall, and sent the embassy a note declaring Skripov persona non grata for "elaborate preparations for espionage" and gave him seven days to leave the country. The Australian government did not divulge what secrets Skripov may have been seeking, but it was reported that workers at the Woomera missile range underwent interrogation. The Soviets responded by stating that the materials released by ASIO proved nothing and were produced to hinder the development of friendly relations between the Soviet Union and Australia, and declared that Ambassador Ivan Kurdyukov, who was on sick leave in Moscow, would not return to Australia.

==== 1963–1991 ====
During the period of Cold War détente, relations between Australia and the Soviet Union were seen as stronger during the Whitlam government. On 3 July 1974, then Prime Minister Gough Whitlam, as Acting Foreign Minister, took the decision to grant de jure recognition of the incorporation of Estonia, Latvia and Lithuania into the USSR. The Australian ambassador to Moscow visited Tallinn, Estonia, on 28–30 July 1974, effectively according de jure recognition. Soviet authorities subsequently leaked this information on 3 August 1974, confirmed by a spokesperson for the Ministry of Foreign Affairs a day later. Whitlam had neither informed nor consulted with the Minister for Foreign Affairs, Senator Willesee, who had been absent abroad, the Cabinet, Caucus, nor Parliament. In taking this controversial decision Whitlam also reneged on pre-election commitments made in correspondences to organizations representing emigrees from all three Baltic nations. Willesee, who upon his return supported Whitlam's decision and subsequently confirmed Whitlam's decision as "unilateral," was eventually censured by the Australian Parliament on 18 September 1974 for his part: "That the Minister for Foreign Affairs is deserving of censure and ought to resign because: in breach of a clear undertaking to the contrary given by the Prime Minister the Government shamefully and furtively extended recognition to the incorporation of the Baltic States in the U.S.S.R., the Minister withholding any announcement or explanation of the decision."

During Question Time in October 1974, Whitlam explained his decision to recognise the de jure incorporation the Baltic states into the Soviet Union was one which did not imply approval of the way in which former states were incorporated, but an acknowledgement of existing realities at the time. Whitlam, ascribed by his political opposition as "want[ing] a good response when he visits Russia", became the first Australian Prime Minister to visit Moscow in January 1975. Whitlam was not received by General Secretary of the Communist Party of the Soviet Union Leonid Brezhnev, who for "reasons of health" was unable to meet him, but instead by Alexei Kosygin, the Chairman of the Soviet of Ministers of the USSR.

During Whitlam's visit to the USSR, two agreements were signed between the two countries on 15 January 1975: the Agreement between the Government of Australia and the Government of the Union of Soviet Socialist Republics on Scientific-Technical Co-operation and the Agreement between the Government of Australia and the Government of the Union of Soviet Socialist Republics on Cultural Co-operation. Following the dismissal of the Whitlam government in 1975 and the resultant election which saw the installation of a conservative Liberal-Country Party coalition government under the leadership of Malcolm Fraser, recognition of the incorporation of the three Baltic states by the Soviet Union was rescinded by Australia in December 1975, and relations became more pragmatic. In 1980, Australia sent athletes to the Summer Olympics in Moscow, which was boycotted by the United States and several other countries, due to the Soviet invasion of Afghanistan the previous year.

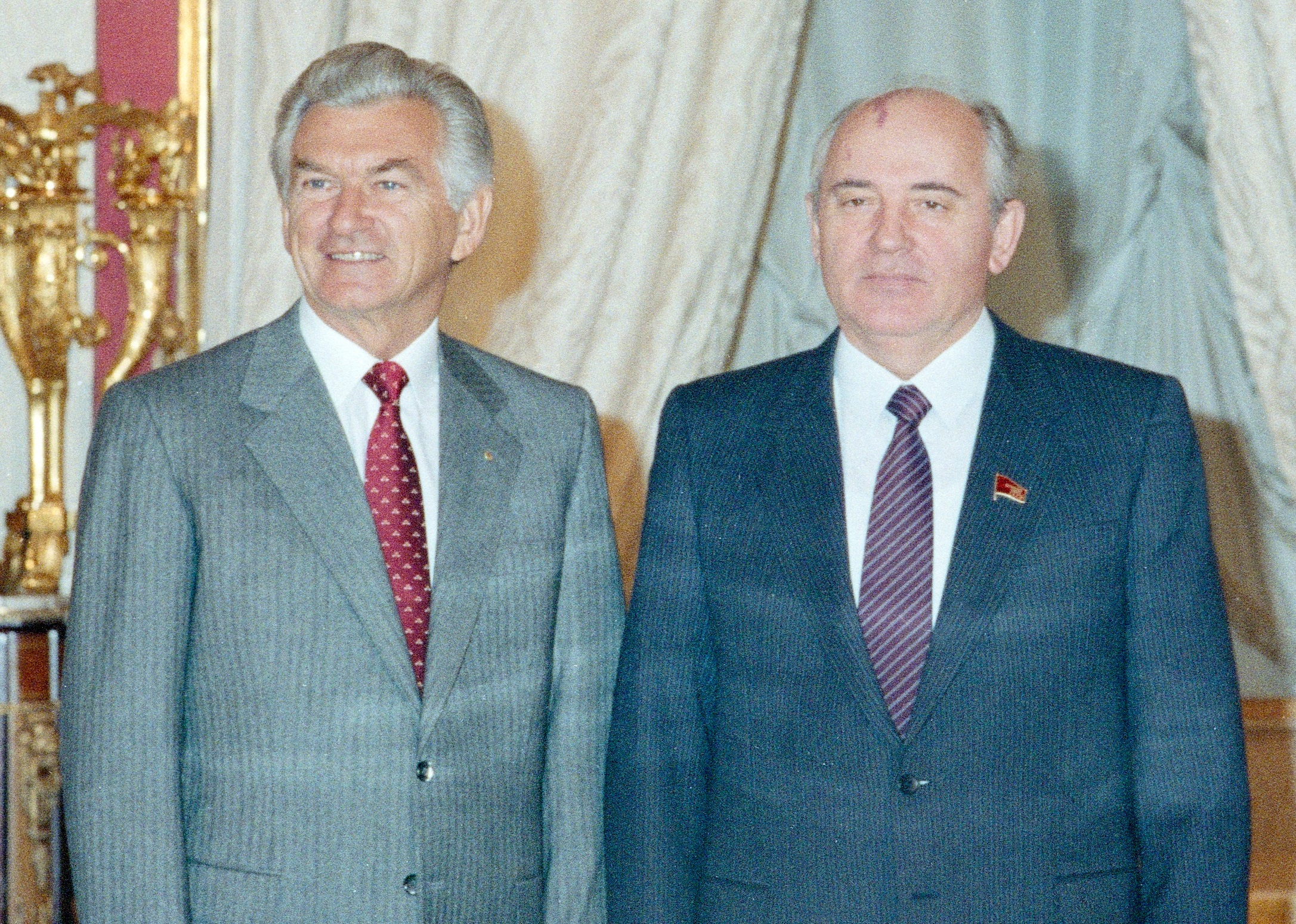
Bob Hawke and Mikhail Gorbachev during the former's visit to the Soviet Union in 1987.

In April 1983, ASIO provided information to the Australian government concerning First Secretary of the Soviet Embassy in Canberra Valery Ivanov. According to ASIO, Ivanov had formed a friendship with former national secretary of the Australian Labor Party David Combe. Bill Hayden, the Australian Foreign Minister, stated that he hoped Ivanov's expulsion would serve as an example to those who were to "work against Australia's interests". The Soviet Embassy responded by denying all charges and called the allegations "far-fetched". The Combe–Ivanov Affair was subject to a Royal Commission presided over by Robert Marsden Hope, which saw Prime Minister Bob Hawke giving evidence for 20 consecutive sitting days.

Australian Prime Minister Bob Hawke arrived in Leningrad on 30 November 1987 for discussion on economics, trade and foreign policy with Mikhail Gorbachev. During the visit, Hawke gave the names of Soviet Jews who wished to leave the Soviet Union to Gorbachev, and on 4 December 1987, 60 to 75 Jews were given permission to leave the country.

== Russian Federation relations ==
=== Diplomatic ties ===
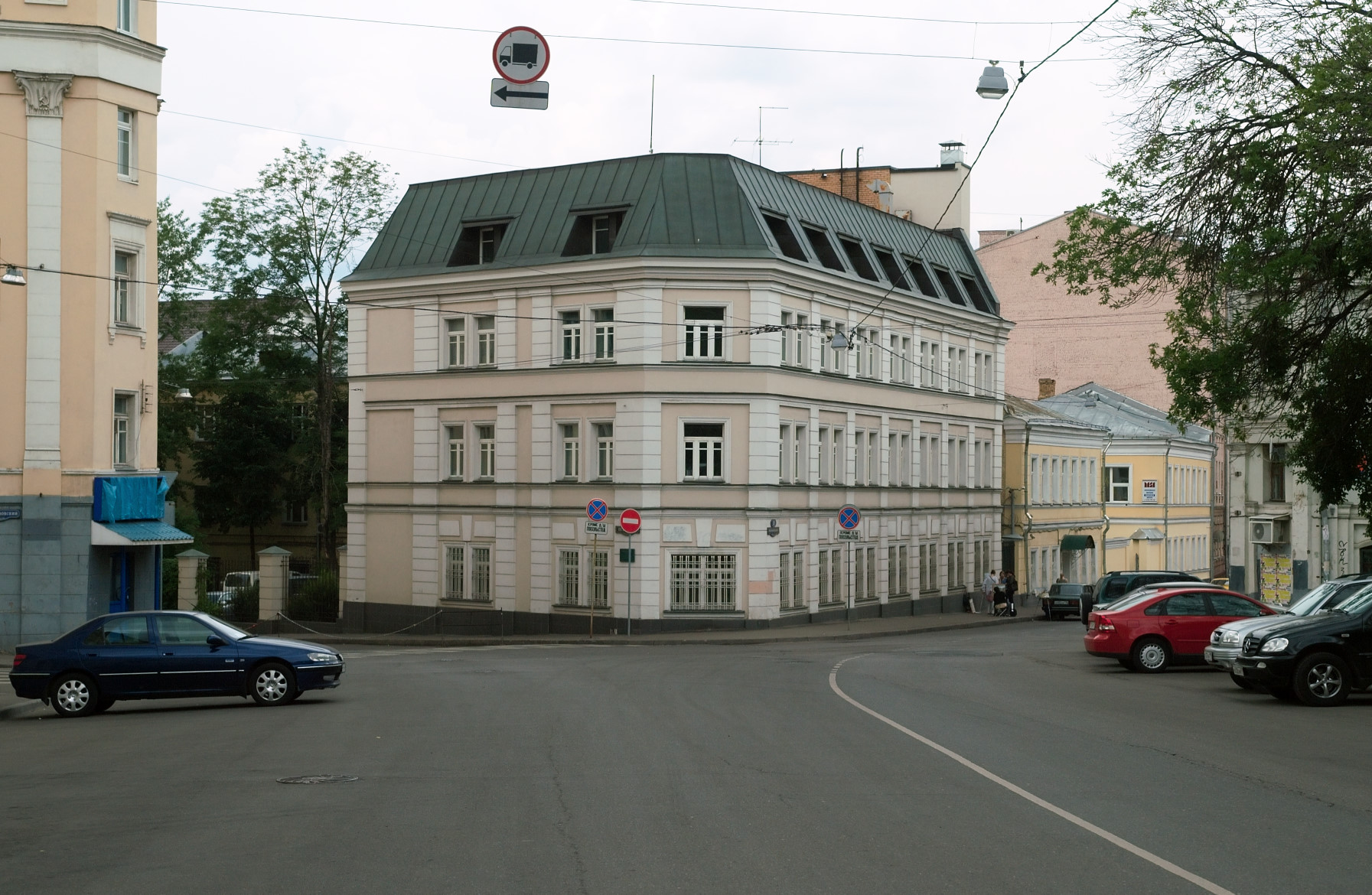
Embassy of Australia in Moscow.

On 26 December 1991, Australia recognised the Russian Federation as the successor state of the Soviet Union after the dissolution of the latter. Russia has an embassy in Canberra and a consulate-general in Sydney, and Australia has an embassy in Moscow. The current Ambassador of Russia to Australia is Aleksey Pavlovsky, while the current Ambassador of Australia to Russia is John Geering.

=== Political ties ===
The Russian government accepted an offer of Rosaviakosmos on 10 March 2001 to co-operate with the Asia-Pacific Space Centre in developing a spaceport on Christmas Island, an Australian territory in the Indian Ocean. The project also saw the involvement of S.P. Korolev Rocket and Space Corporation Energia, TsSKB-Progress and the Barmin General Mechanical Engineering Design Bureau.

In aid of the project, the Agreement between the Government of Australia and the Government of the Russian Federation on Cooperation in the Field of the Exploration and Use of Outer Space for Peaceful Purposes was signed in Canberra on 23 May 2001, replacing the Agreement between the Government of the Union of the Soviet Socialist Republics and the Government of Australia on Cooperation in the Field of Exploration and the Use of Outer Space for Peaceful Purposes of 1 December 1987, and import tax and other concessions were made by the Australian government.

Co-operation in space was on the agenda when Alexander Downer met in Moscow with Russian Foreign Minister Igor Ivanov in February 2002, where the Australian side pressed the Russians to complete work on two technical agreements which were needed in order for the Christmas Island spaceport project to proceed. In June 2002 it was reported that the Russian Federal Space Agency had pulled out of the deal, to instead develop a relationship with ArianeSpace with the view to using the Guiana Space Centre near Kourou in French Guiana.

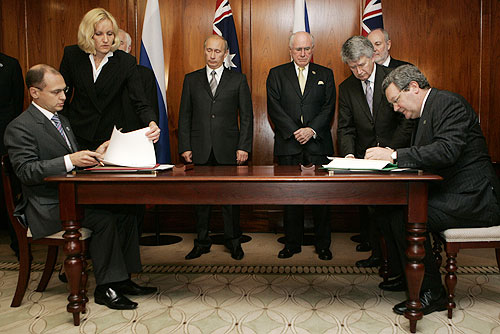
Vladimir Putin and John Howard watch on as Sergey Kiriyenko and Alexander Downer sign the Agreement between the Government of Australia and the Government of the Russian Federation on Cooperation in the Use of Nuclear Energy for Peaceful Purposes in Sydney on 7 September 2007.

In September 2007 President Vladimir Putin became the first incumbent Russian leader to visit Australia for the APEC summit in Sydney. On 7 September 2007, head of Rosatom Sergey Kiriyenko and Australian Minister of Foreign Affairs Alexander Downer, in the presence of Prime Minister John Howard and President Putin, signed the Agreement between the Government of Australia and the Government of the Russian Federation on Cooperation in the Use of Nuclear Energy for Peaceful Purposes, superseding the Agreement between the Government of Australia and the Government of the Union of the Soviet Socialist Republics concerning the peaceful uses of nuclear energy which was concluded on 15 February 1990. The 1990 Agreement only allowed Russia to enrich uranium on behalf of third countries and the 2007 Agreement allowed for enriching of uranium for use in Russia's civilian nuclear power industry.

Putin dismissed suggestions that Russia would use Australia-supplied uranium for nuclear weapons or military purposes, and explained that Russia has an "excessive supply" of weapons-grade uranium and the state has plans to build 30 nuclear power stations by 2022, and that the agreement with Australia was purely one of economics.

The agreement was put into doubt after the August 2008 war in South Ossetia and Russia's subsequent recognition of Abkhazia and South Ossetia as independent states. Stephen Smith, the Australian Foreign Minister, told Sky News Australia in November 2008 that ratification of the agreement would see Australia reviewing Russia's involvement in Georgia, Abkhazia and South Ossetia, and also by taking into account the state of bilateral relations between the two countries.

After Russia recognised Abkhazia and South Ossetia on 26 August 2008, Stephen Smith summoned the Russian ambassador, Alexander Blokhin, to inform him that Russia's recognition was not helpful for the situation in the region, while Blokhin informed the Australian Foreign Minister that Russia was left with no choice but to recognise the independence of the two regions.

Blaming Georgian President Mikheil Saakashvili for the conflict, Blokhin told The Age that the Russians were not the aggressors, but rather the peacekeepers. Rory Medcalf, a strategic analyst with the Lowy Institute, stated that Australia could use the uranium deal to apply pressure on Moscow, but in doing so it risked sending messages to countries such as China that it is an unreliable supplier, which would in turn hurt Australian interests.

=== Economic ties ===
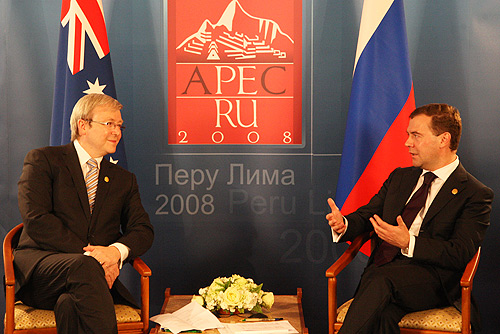
Dmitry Medvedev and Kevin Rudd at APEC Peru 2008.

Australia and Russia are both members of the Asia-Pacific Economic Cooperation forum. Russia applied for entry into the organisation in 1993, and says that the United States and European Union have placed unreasonable demands for it to accede to the organisation, although the United States and the European Union blame Russia for delays in its entry.

==== Investment ====
In September 2007, at the Russia–Australia Business Forum in Brisbane, Ian Macfarlane, the Australian Minister for Industry, Tourism and Resources, estimated that Russian investment in Australia was worth between A$5 and 6 billion. The acquisition by RusAl of a 20% stake in Queensland Alumina was approved by the Australian Foreign Investment Review Board in February 2005. RusAl purchased the stake from Kaiser Aluminum in October 2004, in a deal which was valued at US$461 million. The investment by RusAl was the first large-scale Russian investment in the Australian economy.

Magnitogorsk Iron and Steel Works, headed by Viktor Rashnikov, increased its stake in iron ore miner Fortescue from 4.71 percent to 5.37 in August 2007, and the following month advised the Australian Government it wished to increase its stake, with a potential value of A$1.5 billion. It is expected by the 2050, the 2.7 billion people of the BRIC countries—Brazil, Russia, India and People's Republic of China—will treble consumption of steel, which will require steel production to double from 2007 limits.

Alan Carpenter, the Premier of Western Australia, welcomed Russian investment in his state's economy, telling Lateline Business, "[t]he more we can get from international investment to deliberate the potential of Western Australia's economy, the better". In April 2008, Carpenter became the first Western Australian Premier to visit Russia, when he headed a trade delegation for a five-day trip to the country to court more Russian investment in the state.

==== Trade statistics ====
Monthly value of Australian merchandise exports to the Russian Federation (A$ millions) since 1992

Monthly value of Russian Federation merchandise exports to Australia (A$ millions) since 1992

In 2008, Australian-Russian bilateral trade exceeded US$1 billion for the first time. Russia imported US$1.029 billion worth of goods and services from Australia in 2008, while its exports to Australia were valued at US$82 million, bringing the total to US$1.111 billion. According to the Russian Federal Customs Service, trade with Australia accounted for 0.2% of all Russian foreign trade in 2008.

Summary of bilateral trade 2003–2009
| | 2003 | 2004 | 2005 | 2006 | 2007 | 2008 | 2009 |
|---|---|---|---|---|---|---|---|
| Total Australian exports to Russia (A$ '000) | 151,380 | 185,537 | 335,601 | 654,235 | 661,392 | 1,115,051 | 584,541 |
| Total Russian exports to Australia (A$ '000) | 38,829 | 58,881 | 100,833 | 63,832 | 126,514 | 599,727 | 357,582 |

=== Russo-Ukrainian war ===
==== Russian invasion of Ukraine ====
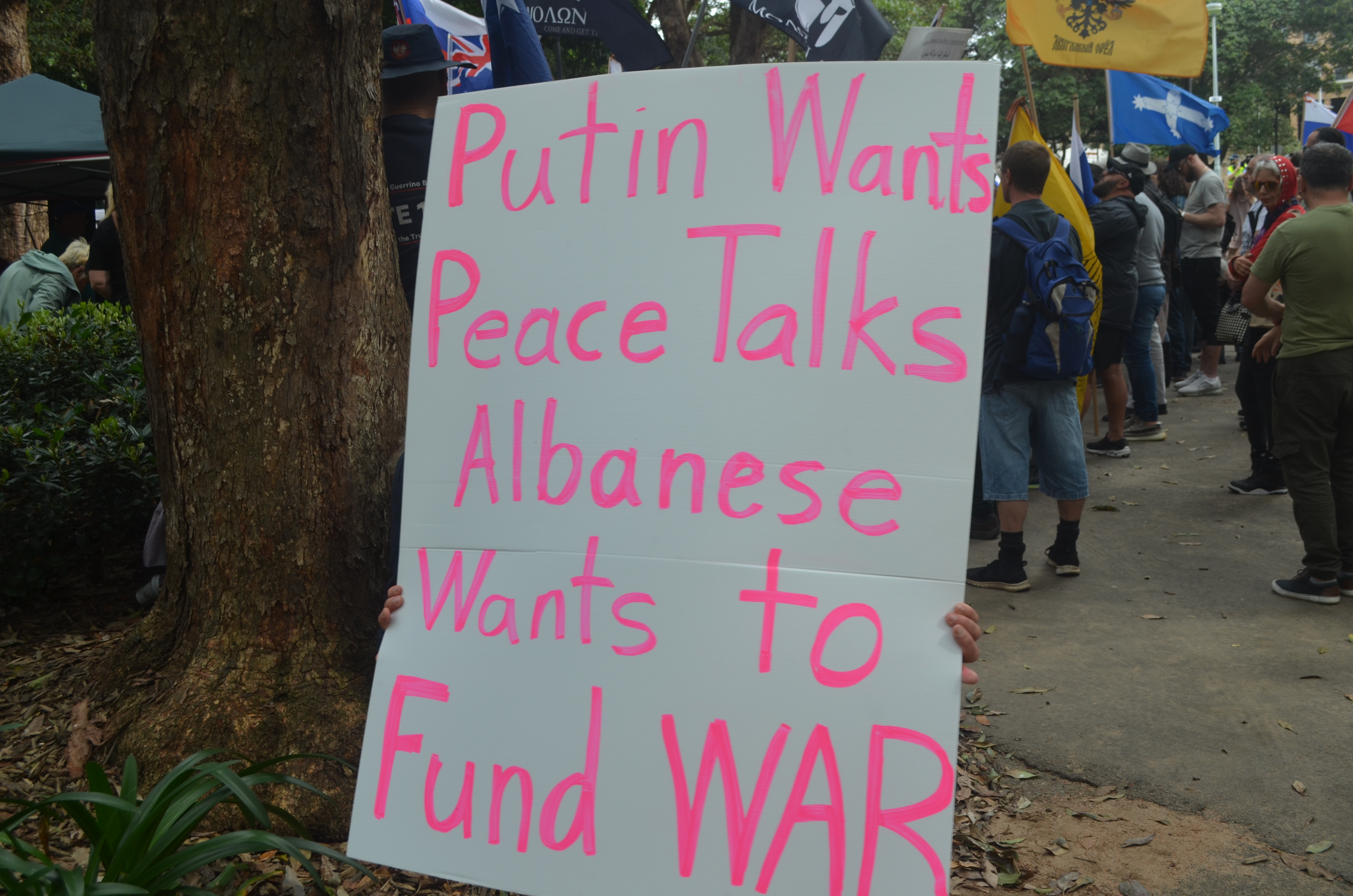
Sign reading Putin wants peace Albanese wants to fund war. Criticising Australian military aid to Ukraine at the March for Australian neutrality in Sydney in October 2022

Amidst the threat of a Russian invasion of Ukraine, Australia evacuated its embassy in Kyiv and urged all its citizens in the country to leave. Following the invasion in February 2022, Australia committed $70 million to provide both lethal and nonlethal aid to Ukraine, with Australian Prime Minister Scott Morrison arguing that Russia should be treated as a pariah state. The Russian government included Australia on an adopted list of countries it deemed as "taking unfriendly actions against Russia, Russian companies, and citizens", in reference to economic sanctions introduced during the war. Newly elected Prime Minister Anthony Albanese visited Kyiv in June and rapidly increased support for Ukraine against Russia. By February 2023, Australia had committed over $650 million in material and financial support.

In June 2023, a case by the Australian Federal Court saw the National Capital Authority attempting to revoke a lease by Russia, to construct a new embassy building in Canberra. The case was thrown out, with the court arguing that terminating the lease was "Invalid and of no effect". New legislation passed by the government suspended the lease and cease development, citing national security concerns. The move was supported by both the government and opposition. The site would have stood only 400 meters away from Parliament House. While a case was made to the High Court by Russia for an injunction, the bid was thrown out. In response to the incident, a Russian diplomat began squatting on the site for three days.

In July 2024, a married Russian-Australian couple were charged by the Australian Federal Police (AFP) for espionage after allegedly attempting to gather and send state secrets from the Australian Defence Force to Russia. After an interview with the couple, Russian media outlet RT accused the AFP of fabricating evidence. On 23 December 2024, the Australian government confirmed it was working to locate 32-year-old Australian man Oscar Jenkins after he appeared in a video on pro-Kremlin social media accounts purportedly showing him being detained and questioned by Russian soldiers in Ukraine. Jenkins had been serving in the Ukrainian armed forces and was given a 13-year prison sentence for "acting as a mercenary" under Russian criminal law. The Australian foreign minister Penny Wong described his trial as a "sham." In March 2025, Russia issued a warning to Australia about sending troops to Ukraine as part of a proposed international peacekeeping mission by European leaders. The Russian Embassy in Australia stressed that such actions would lead to “grave consequences” and undermine peace efforts, emphasising the unacceptability of any Western military presence in Ukraine. Although no formal request had been made, Wong reaffirmed Australia's dedication to promoting peace and stated that any request for a peace keeping mission would be carefully considered. In August 2026, the Australian Federal Police charged a 27-year-old Russian-Australian man with foreign interference after allegedly joining the Ukrainian armed forces to gather intelligence for Russia.

==== Sanctions ====
Following Russia's 2014 annexation of Crimea, Australia's foreign minister Julie Bishop announced financial and travel sanctions on over a dozen political figures from the region. By March 2015, Australia expanded economic sanctions on Russia in relation to Crimea and Sevastopol concerning the energy, minerals and military sectors. Australia also withdrew investment related to infrastructure, transport, energy, mineral and telecommunications.

In immediate response to the 2022 invasion, the Morrison government imposed sanctions targeting the separatist regions of the Donetsk People's Republic and Luhansk People's Republic as well as members of Russia's National Security Council. Further sanctions were imposed on president Putin, foreign minister Sergey Lavrov, 339 members of the Russian parliament and "oligarchs" close to Putin. In March, Australia added sanctions on Russia's media environment targeting misinformation about the conflict. These included sanctions on Dmitry Peskov, the Kremlin press secretary, Maria Zakharova, spokesperson for the Russian Ministry of Foreign Affairs, state propagandists and military officials. Australia targeted notable "oligarchs" Oleg Deripaska and Viktor Vekselberg, as well as over 20 Russian businesses and 67 government officials and other "oligarchs." Additionally, Australia announced a 35% tariff on all imports from Russia and Belarus, and banned the export of alumina and bauxite to Russia.

In response, Russia banned 228 Australian political figures including Morrison, Albanese and all members of the Australian Parliament. The Russian Foreign Ministry stated that the blacklist was in retaliation to Australia's "unfriendly actions" aimed at containing Russia, which it described as "Russophobic" and "docilely" following other Western countries. Moscow also warned that it would expand the blacklist to include Australian military officials, business people, experts and journalists who allegedly "incited a negative attitude towards Russia." In June, Russia announced further sanctions against 121 Australian politicians, business people and journalists including businesswoman Gina Rinehart, South Australian Premier Peter Malinauskas and media official Kerry Stokes.

During the course of the conflict, the Australian government has gradually expanded sanctions and rhetoric against Russia.

== Opinion polls ==
In a 2024 poll by Australian think tank the Lowy Institute, Russia was the second least positively viewed country by Australians with a 21% favorability rating, placed behind only North Korea, which had a 15% rating. In their 2008 version of the poll, which was the earliest to include Russia, the country had a 55% rating, which placed it above Indonesia, South Korea and Iran.

In a 2010 survey of those living in the Russian Far East, 34% of respondents said they liked Australia the most, placing it behind Japan, which garnered 41% of the votes. Other countries in the survey included China, which garnered 16% of votes (and only 4% of votes in the 1995 version of the survey). In 2012, young people from the Russian Far East city of Vladivostok were surveyed about Australia. It was found that Australia evoked only positive reactions from most respondents, but only 44% were able to name the capital of Australia, and a mere 8% were able to recall the name of the acting Prime Minister of Australia.

== See also ==
- Foreign relations of Australia
- Foreign relations of Russia
- List of ambassadors of Australia to Russia
- List of ambassadors of Russia to Australia
- Russian Australians

== Bibliography ==
- Cain, Frank (1994). The Australian Security Intelligence Organization. Routledge. ISBN 0-7146-3477-8.
- Gan, Irina (2009). "The reluctant hosts: Soviet Antarctic expedition ships visit Australia and New Zealand in 1956". Polar Record. 45 (232). Hobart: Institute of Antarctic and Southern Ocean Studies, University of Tasmania: 37–50. Bibcode:2009PoRec..45...37G. doi:10.1017/S0032247408007675. S2CID 145179179.
- Ginsburgs, George (1987). A calendar of Soviet treaties, 1974–1980. BRILL. ISBN 90-247-3628-5.
- Ginsburgs, George; Slusser, Robert M. (1981). A calendar of Soviet treaties, 1958–1973. BRILL. ISBN 90-286-0609-2.
- Protopopov, Michael (2006). A Russian Presence: A History of the Russian Church in Australia. Gorgias Press LLC. ISBN 1-59333-321-8.
- Slusser, Robert M.; Triska, Jan F. (1959). A calendar of Soviet treaties, 1917–1957. Stanford University Press. ISBN 0-8047-0587-9.
