= Russian Australians =

Русские австралийцы
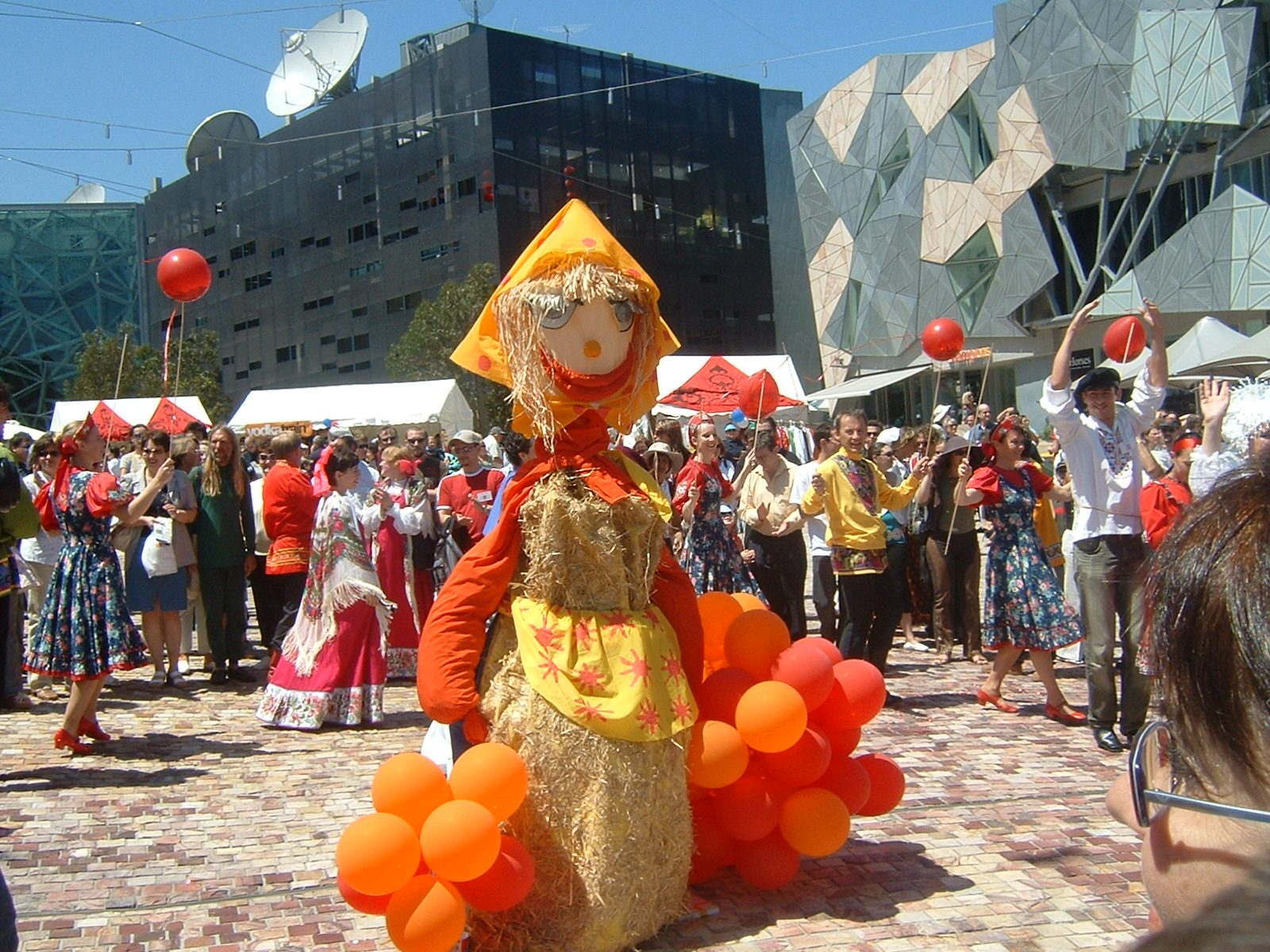
- Celebration of Maslenitsa in Federation Square, Melbourne

Total population
- 18,278 (by birth, 2011); 98,112 (by ancestry, 2011)

Regions with significant populations
- Nationwide

Languages
- Russian, Australian English

Religion
- Russian Orthodox, Judaism

Related ethnic groups
- Russian New Zealanders, Ukrainian Australians, Jewish Australians, Russian Canadians, Russian Americans

Russian Australians (Russian: Русские австралийцы, romanized: Russkiye avstraliytsy) comprise Australian citizens who have full or partial Russian heritage or people who emigrated from Russia and reside in Australia.

== History ==
=== Early naval contact ===
In 1807 the sloop Neva sailed to Port Jackson, under the command of Captain lieutenant Ludwig von Hagemeister, where it loaded provisions on its way to Russian America. As this was the first Russian vessel to travel to the Australian mainland, this is occasionally considered the start of relations between Australian colonies and Russia.

Contacts continued in 1820 when the Russian ships Vostok (meaning 'East'), and the Mirny (Peaceful), under the command of captains Mikhail Lazarev and Fabian Gottlieb von Bellingshausen, visited Port Jackson. They sought provisions and repairs on several occasions during an expedition to explore Antarctica that Tsar Alexander I had promoted. Until the middle of the 19th century, only a few dozen Russians, Ukrainians, Lithuanians, Latvians, Finns and other émigrés from the Russian Empire were resident in Australia, which was still a part of the British Empire.

Russian ships visited Australia throughout the 19th century and a number of Russian seamen absconded from their ships to settle permanently in Australia. Religious sects, including the Mennonites and Doukhobors, made plans to send up to 40,000 settlers to Australia and New Guinea but after much debate in the Russian press, and 2,000 applications to emigrate, this mass emigration did not materialise.

The Russian Imperial Navy corvette Bogatyr made a friendly visit to Melbourne and Sydney in 1863. Information from Polish deserters pointed to Russian plans to attack Australia in support of the Union cause. (See Australia and the American Civil War: Imperial Russian Navy) In 1882 three Russian Navy ships – the Africa, Vestnik (Herald or Messenger) and Plastun – made port in Melbourne, sparking renewed fears in the press of a Russian invasion. A brief mobilisation of defence forces ensued before the lack of aggressive intent was made clear. In 1885 concerned British colonists thought a Russian invasion was again imminent and built Bare Island Fort to protect "Sydney's back door" in Botany Bay.

=== Waves of emigration ===
Up to 250,000 people a year emigrated from the Russian Empire to countries such as the United States, Canada, Argentina and Brazil towards the end of the 19th century. Australia was a much less popular destination, with only 300 Russians leaving for Australia in 1890. According to the Census in 1891, the number of Russians living in Australia was 2881, comprising 2350 men and 531 women.

==== The first wave 1880–1905 ====
The first major wave of Russian emigrants to Australia began in the late nineteenth and early twentieth century, largely Jews from the Baltic and south west of Russia escaping anti-Semitism and a wave of pogroms which raged in the wake of Tsar Alexander II's assassination on 1 March (old calendar) 1881. The number of Russians according to the Australian census is shown in table below.

Census year	1871	1881	1891	1901	1911	1921
Number of Russians in Australia	720	1303	2970	3372	4456	7659

By the time of the formation of the Australian Commonwealth in 1901, a total of 3,358 Russians were resident in the newly created country, comprising 1,262 in New South Wales, 954 in Victoria, 454 in Queensland, 251 in South Australia, 400 in Western Australia and 37 in Tasmania. Most emigrants had come via England at this time, but in the future many travelled via the newly opened Trans-Siberian Railway and ports in the far east, which provided a quicker and cheaper route. Letters from Antipodean emigrants were commonly published in the Russian press and had the effect of encouraging potential emigrants to consider this exotic new land as a possible destination.

==== The second wave 1905–1917 ====
A second wave occurred between the defeat of Russia in the Russian-Japanese War in 1905, the revolution of that year and the February Revolution in 1917. These migrants comprised political opponents of the Czarist regime and defectors from compulsory military service in the Russian armed forces. According to Alexander Nikolayevich Abaza, the Russian General Consul in Australia in 1914, there were 12,000 people from the Russian empire in Australia out of a total population of 4.5 million. The lure of Australia's democracy and social mobility outweighed the hardships which many of the emigres suffered in their first years, often in labouring jobs due to their lack of English.

During the World War I no less than one quarter of all the Russian males living in Australia served in the Australian Army. By percentage it was more than for the general Australian population. There were more Russian nationals serving in the Australian Army than nationals from any other non-Anglo-Saxon country. Many more applied but were rejected either because of poor command of English or because of their medical conditions. Many of the recruits were motivated by their gratitude to their new country. Another important factor was the policy of Consul-General Abaza, who lobbied for the forceful return of all Russian nationals who would not serve in Russian Army (unlike Australia, Russia had a mandatory military service policy).

No less than 150 Russian nationals in the Australian and New Zealand Army Corps participated in the Battle of Gallipoli. No less than 400 Russians were among ANZACs on the Western Front in 1916.

==== The third wave 1917–1939 ====
The Australian Government placed an embargo on immigration from Russia between 1917 and 1922 due to the Russian revolution and subsequent Russian Civil War. After the lifting of this prohibition after the defeat of the white movement, a third wave of Russians migrated to Australia in the 1920s after the defeat of the White Army by the Bolshevik forces. These were known as the White emigres. Many of these refugees embarked from Manchuria, having been driven to Siberia by the rampant Red Army.

==== The fourth wave 1945–1960 ====
A fourth wave of emigrants came to Australia after the Second World War, comprising Russian prisoners of war and displaced Russian citizens. These people faced persecution in Stalin's Soviet Union, being seen as collaborators or contaminated with dangerous Western influences. Many Russians, fearing forced repatriation to the Soviet Union where they faced death in the Gulag, claimed to be Polish to escape Stalin's dictat that all Soviet citizens must return. There had been a large influx of Russian Orthodox refugees from China following the Japanese invasion of Manchuria in 1931 and more fled Mao Zedong's rise to power after the defeat of the Chinese Nationalist Army. Refuge in Australia for the Russian colony in China was negotiated by archbishop John of Shanghai. His success in negotiations with the Labor Government of Ben Chifley is sometimes seen as a miracle proving John's sainthood. Several Russian born emigrants to Australia have published accounts of their escapes from Soviet Russia and Communist China, including Alex Saranin's 'Child of the Kulaks' and 'The Tarasov Saga' by Igor Ivashkoff (Gary Nash).

Alexander Kerensky, the leader of the Russian Provisional Government overthrown by the Bolsheviks in 1917, lived in Brisbane in 1945-6 with the family of his terminally ill wife.

==== The fifth wave – Russians in Australia today ====
People with Russian ancestry as a percentage of the population in Australia divided geographically by statistical local area, as of the 2011 census

The 2006 Census revealed Australia had a Russian-born population of 15,354. Most Russian-born residents live in Melbourne (5,407) or Sydney (5,367). A significant portion of Russian-born residents are women (62%), and most (69%) had arrived in Australia no earlier than 1990. Also at the 2006 Census 67,055 Australian residents declared that they had Russian ancestry, either alone or in combination with one other ancestry.

Whereas previously many Russian immigrants were Jewish, in recent years Jewish emigration has been less evident. Notable Russian emigrates include boxer Kostya Tszyu and pole vault champion Tatiana Grigorieva, who won a silver medal in the 2000 Sydney Olympics and noted Constitutional jurist Liubov Poshevelya.

Sydney's Bondi Beach is a popular area for Russian and Russian-Jewish migrants, with several restaurants and specialist shops catering to their needs. However, Russians live throughout New South Wales and Australia with less concentration in certain areas as might have been in the early waves of immigration. The traditional centres such as Strathfield and Sydney's Bondi are ever-changing communities catering to new people and services such as language schools and churches have not been well distributed beyond these areas since the 1980s. There is no language school, church or related services (for example) available in the northern suburbs of Sydney, despite Russians and other Slavic Europeans taking to the area in the recent waves of migration. The Australian Russian community is served nationally by Russian language radio broadcasting team at SBS Special Broadcasting Service Government radio station which broadcasts in 58 community languages.

According to Russian Federal State Statistics Service there are about 1200 Russians who left Russia for Australia from 2000 to 2008. Roughly 170 Russians leave Russia for Australia every year.

== Demographics ==
Russian Australian demography by religion (note that it includes only Russian born in Russia and not australian with a Russian background)
Religious group	2021 (Note: Religious breakdown proportions based on "Russian" ethnic or cultural origin response on the 2021 census.)		2016 (Note: Religious breakdown proportions based on "Russian" ethnic or cultural origin response on the 2016 census.)		2011 (Note: Religious breakdown proportions based on "Russian" ethnic or cultural origin response on the 2011 census.)	
Religious group	Pop.	%	Pop.	%	Pop.	%
Eastern Orthodox	7,177 ▲	30.07% ▼	6,695 ▼	32.77% ▼	7,739	42.34%
Catholic	541 ▼	2.27% ▼	578 ▼	2.83% ▼	754	4.13%
Other Christian denomination	2,862 ▲	11.99% ▼	2,662 ▲	13.03% ▲	1,366	7.47%
(Total Christian)	10,588 ▲	44.37% ▼	9,938 ▲	48.65% ▼	9,851	53.9%
Islam	224 ▲	0.94% ▲	135 ▼	0.66% ▼	140	0.77%
Irreligion	10,355 ▲	43.39% ▲	7,242 ▲	35.45% ▲	4,814	26.34%
Buddhism	120 ▲	0.5% ▼	114 ▲	0.56% ▲	92	0.5%
Hinduism	64 ▲	0.27%	56 ▲	0.27% ▲	44	0.24%
Judaism	1,471 ▼	6.16% ▼	1,701 ▼	8.33% ▼	2,325	12.72%
Other	67 ▲	0.28% ▲	40 ▼	0.2% ▼	45	0.25%
Not stated	970 ▼	4.06% ▼	1,194 ▲	5.84% ▲	969	5.3%
Total Russian Australian population	23,864 ▲	100%	20,429 ▲	100%	18,277	100%

Russian Australian demography by religion (Ancestry included)
Religious group	2021		2016		2011	
Religious group	Pop.	%	Pop.	%	Pop.	%
Eastern Orthodox	28,664 ▲	23.5% ▲	14,345 ▼	13.52% ▼	29,622	31.99%
Catholic	8,352 ▲	6.85% ▼	8,228 ▲	7.76% ▼	8,159	8.81%
Other Christian denomination	18,003 ▲	14.76% ▼	17,380 ▲	16.38% ▲	13,469	14.55%
(Total Christian)	55,024 ▲	45.11% ▼	52,840 ▲	49.81% ▼	51,245	55.34%
Islam	915 ▲	0.75% ▲	677 ▲	0.64% ▲	505	0.55%
Irreligion	50,739 ▲	41.6% ▲	35,149 ▲	33.13% ▲	23,350	25.22%
Buddhism	650 ▼	0.53% ▼	688 ▲	0.65% ▼	614	0.66%
Hinduism	218 ▲	0.18% ▲	185 ▲	0.17% ▲	146	0.16%
Judaism	10,008 ▼	8.21% ▼	10,574 ▼	9.97% ▼	11,185	12.08%
Other	518 ▲	0.42% ▲	385 ▼	0.36% ▼	396	0.43%
Not stated	3,899 ▼	3.2% ▼	5,576 ▲	5.26% ▼	5,148	5.56%
Total Russian Australian population	121,971 ▲	100%	106,079 ▲	100%	92,592	100%

== The Russian Orthodox Church in Australia ==
The first Russian Orthodox parish in Australia was founded in Brisbane in 1925. The parish church of St Nicholas there (now St Nicholas Russian Orthodox Cathedral) was intended to be a monument to the Tsar-martyr Nicholas II.

The first Russian Saint Vladimir Cathedral in Sydney was opened in 1938 in celebration of the 950th anniversary of the baptism of Russia. Many more churches were opened after World War II. An Australian Diocese of the Russian Orthodox Church Outside of Russia (ROCOR, also known as the Russian Church Abroad (ROCA), or the Synod) was formed and now has about 42 centres in Australia and New Zealand including St Peter and Paul Cathedral in Strathfield NSW, and area where many Russians had settled. There is also the Russian Orthodox convent in Kentlyn, near Sydney, and the Holy Transfiguration Monastery in Bombala, NSW. Some Russian churches set up Russian schools to preserve Russian language and customs.

There are also parishes of the Russian Orthodox Church (Moscow Patriarchate) in Glen Iris, Victoria (celebrating in English) and in Blacktown, NSW, (celebrating in Slavonic). There is a small Belarusian Orthodox community in Bankstown, NSW, that is administered by the Moscow Patriarchate. The Russian Orthodox congregation in South Yarra, Melbourne, is under the jurisdiction of the Greek Orthodox Archdiocese and celebrates services in Russian. There are some parishes of Lipovan Orthodox Old-Rite Church which represent the tradition of Russian Old Believers.

== Notable Russian Australians ==
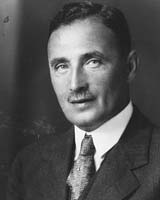
Sidney Myer, born Simcha Baevski, was a typical representative of the first major wave of Russian emigres

The Myer shopping chain, still a dominant power in the Australian retail sector, was founded by early Russian speaking Jewish immigrant Sidney Myer in Melbourne, his first store set up as the 'Myer Emporium'. He supported new Russian emigres to Melbourne for as long as he lived.

Online retail entrepreneur Ruslan Kogan was born in Belarus and migrated to Australia in 1989 at the age of 5. In 2006 he started one of the biggest online retailers in the country, Kogan, which makes and sells affordable technology. He is also co-founder of furniture retailer Milan Direct. In 2012 he was named the richest person under 30 in Australia by BRW magazine.

The mine engineer Ilya Repin (1888–1949), after settling in Sydney in 1925, helped create a Russian Orthodox Church in Sydney on Robertson Road in the 1930s. First holding services in his own cottage, he founded the Church of Saint Vladimir on this site, a 'khram' which exists to this day. There is a long history of Russian cultural and artistic visits to Australia. In 1913, the Russian Imperial Ballet toured Australia, the first and only performances of Russian actors before the First World War. In 1926 the famous Russian ballerina Anna Pavlova danced in Melbourne and Sydney, giving a great boost to the embryonic Australian ballet of its day and in the same year, famed opera singer Feodor Chaliapin made an Australian concert tour. Renowned ballerina Irina Baronova toured Australia before the Second World War and lived in Byron Bay, New South Wales from 2000 until her death in 2008. She was a vice-president of the Royal Academy of Dance and a patron of The Australian Ballet, and published her memoirs in 2005.

Kira Bousloff (Abricossova) (1914–2001) is best known as the founder of the oldest ballet company in Australia – the WA State Ballet Co. Born in Monte Carlo to Russian parents, she came to Australia as a member of the Covent Garden Russian Ballet company in 1938 and remained in Australia after the tour ended in 1939. She moved to Perth with her husband composer James Penberthy and established the Western Australian State Ballet Company in 1952.

Pianists Alexander Sverjensky and Phillip Shovk and painter Danila Vassilieff worked in Australia and boosted the local development of their arts, while art historian Nina Kristesen established the Department of Russian Language and Literature at Melbourne University in 1946.

Russian arts festivals and events are popular in Australia. The 150th anniversary of Alexander Pushkin's death was commemorated with poetry festivals in 1987 and a range of Russian cultural and social organisations are active in the major cities of Melbourne and Sydney. The Russian Connection provides an independent and comprehensive guide to cultural events and occasions with a Russian flavour in Australia. The organisation promotes Russian cultural activities such as art exhibitions, ballet, classical music, concerts, festivals, children's events, movies, musicals, lectures, opera, and theatre. The Russian Connection is continually expanding with the recent addition of a catalogue of new Russian literature and Russian language movies available from various public libraries.

- Prince Michael Andreevich of Russia.
- Adam Byrnes: Immigration lawyer and former Rugby Union player.
- Alexei Popyrin: Tennis player.
- Daria Gavrilova: Tennis player.
- Greg Jeloudev: Rugby Union player.
- Daria Kasatkina: Tennis player
- Peter Mengede: Guitarist and founding member of the American bands Helmet and Handsome.
- Vladimir Mikhaylovich Petrov: Diplomat.
- Evdokia Petrova: Russian spy in Australia.
- Costa Ronin: Actor.
- Daria Varlamova : Miss Universe Australia 2021.
- Ekaterina Alexandrovskaya: Pair skater

== Australians in Russia ==
The Russian connections in Australia are mostly composed by Russian-borns moving to or visiting Australia. The most notable representative of the Australians moving to Russia is the famous physicist Aleksandr Mikhailovich Prokhorov. He was born in Atherton, Queensland, Australia, to a family of Russian immigrants in 1916. He and his parents relocated to the Soviet Union in 1923. In 1964 he received the Nobel Prize in Physics for his work on lasers and masers. He was also the chief editor of the Great Soviet Encyclopedia from 1969.

== See also ==
- Australia–Russia relations
- Asian Australians
- Diocese of Sydney, Australia and New Zealand
- European Australians
- Europeans in Oceania
- Immigration to Australia
- Russian Jack
- Russian House (Melbourne)
- Russian diaspora
- Tatar Australians
