= Alexander Massov =

Russian historian

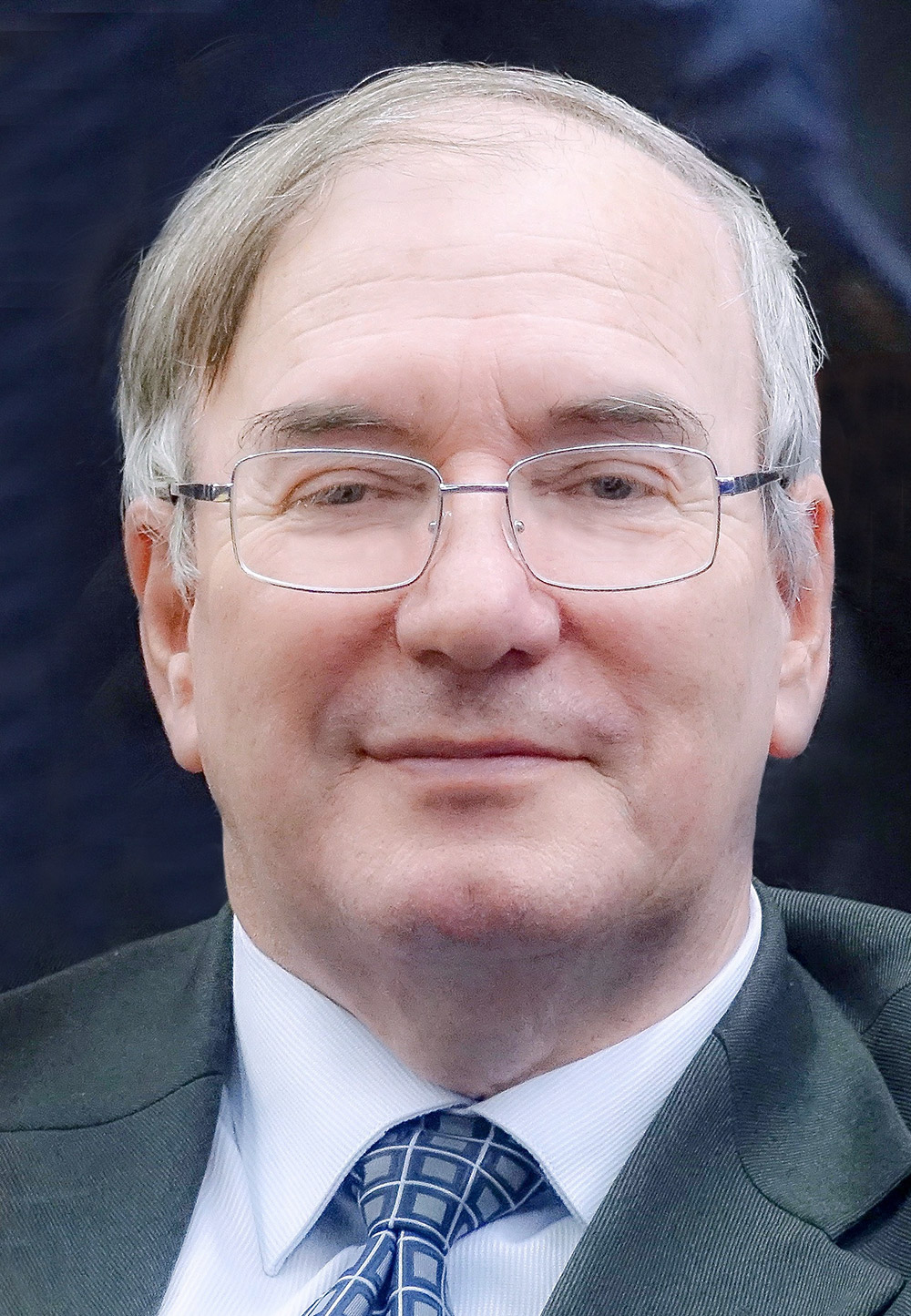
- Born: 7 March 1950; Leningrad, Russian SFSR, Soviet Union
- Education: Department of History and Cultural Studies of Leningrad State University (1972)
- Known for: Research on History of Australia and Australia–Russia relations
- Awards: Honorary Worker of Higher Professional Education of the Russian Federation
- Academic career
- Fields: History, Australian studies
- Institutions: Department of History and Cultural Studies, Saint Petersburg State Marine Technical University
- Doctoral advisors: Kirill Vinogradov, Vladimir Revunenkov, Boris Komissarov
- Website: Profile on the SMTU website (in Russian)

Alexander Yakovlevich Massov (Александр Яковлевич Массов; born 7 March 1950) is a Russian historian, Doctor of Historical Sciences, and professor specialising in the history of Australia, Russian-Australian relations, and the history of South Pacific countries. From 1998 to 2022, he served as the head of the Department of History and Cultural Studies at Saint Petersburg State Marine Technical University. Since 2022, Massov has been a full professor at this department. His research focuses on Russian-Australian relations and the history of Russian exploration and diplomatic contacts in the Pacific region.

== Biography ==
Alexander Yakovlevich Massov was born on 7 March 1950 in Leningrad to a family of an engineer and a secondary school history teacher. He received his higher education at the Faculty of History of Leningrad State University (now Saint Petersburg State University), graduating with honours in 1972. From 1972 to 1975, he completed postgraduate studies at Leningrad State University, defending his Candidate of Sciences thesis on the topic Colonial Expansion of Australia in New Guinea in 1884–1941. In 1995, he defended his Doctor of Sciences thesis at Saint Petersburg State University on the topic Formation and Development of Russian-Australian Relations (1807–1901).

== Academic and teaching career ==
Since 1976, Massov has worked at Saint Petersburg State Marine Technical University (until 1990 known as Leningrad Shipbuilding Institute), where he advanced from assistant to professor and department head. He was among the first in Russian historical science to study contacts and connections between Russia and Australia and their impact on the development of Australian society in the 19th and early 20th centuries. From 2008 to 2024, he was also a professor in the Master's program Pacific Studies at Saint Petersburg State University. In addition, Massov is a member of the editorial board of the journal News of Saint Petersburg State University of Technology and Design (Series 2. Art criticism. Philological sciences).

Massov's research interests include:

- History of Australia–Russia relations during the colonial period of Australian history
- Study of the Russian diaspora in Australia
- Historical and historical-geographical aspects of voyages by ships of the Imperial Russian Navy in South Pacific
- Research and social activities of Russian scientist Nikolai Miklouho-Maclay in Australia and Oceania

He is the author of more than 370 scientific and educational-methodological works published in Russia and Australia, including 2 individual monographs and co-authorship in 11 collective monographs. In the 1990s, he was part of the editorial team preparing a six-volume collection of works by Nikolai Miklouho-Maclay. Massov also served as one of the compilers of collections of documentary materials about visits to Australia by Russian sailors and travellers and as publisher of archival documents about the activities of Russian consuls in Australia in the 19th and early 20th centuries. A significant number of documents discovered and subsequently published in these collections were introduced into scholarly circulation for the first time.

In 2021, he participated in the establishment of the All-Russian Association of Researchers of the South Pacific Region and assumed the position of Chair of its Scientific and Expert Council.

His scholarly work has contributed significantly to international understanding of Russian-Australian relations, with his publications being cited by researchers in Australia, Russia, and other countries studying Pacific region history and diplomatic relations. Reviews of Massov's work, in particular, note his role in publishing previously unknown archival materials and diplomatic documents that shed light on 19th-century Russian engagement with Australia and the broader Pacific region.

== Major publications ==
=== Monographs ===
- Massov A. Ya. (1995). The St Andrew's Flag Under the Southern Cross. (From the History of Russian-Australian Relations in the First Third of the 19th Century) (in Russian). St Petersburg: SMTU. p. 127. ISBN 5-88303-016-5.
- Massov A. Ya. (1998). Russia and Australia in the Second Half of the 19th Century (in Russian). St Petersburg: SMTU. p. 239. ISBN 5-88303-113-7.
- Alexander Massov, John McNair and Thomas Poole, ed. (2007). Encounters under the Southern Cross: Two Centuries of Russian-Australian Relations, 1807-2007. Adelaide: Crawford House. p. 419. ISBN 978-1863333238.
- N. N. Miklouho-Maclay Jr., ed. (2020). Russia and Oceania. Research and Travels by Russians in the 19th–21st Centuries (in Russian). Scientific editor & co-author: Alexander Massov. St Petersburg: Miklouho-Maclay Foundation. p. 116. ISBN 978-5-89282-956-4.
- D. S. Panarina, ed. (2021). South Pacific Region in Past and Present. Vol. 2 (in Russian). Co-author: Alexander Massov. Moscow: Institute of Oriental Studies RAS. p. 383. ISBN 978-5-907543-02-7.

=== Documentary publications ===
- E. V. Govor, A. Ya. Massov, ed. (2007). Russian Sailors and Travellers in Australia (in Russian). Moscow: Vostochnaya Literatura. p. 380. ISBN 978-5-02-036316-8.
- A. Ya. Massov and M. Pollard, ed. (2014). Russian Consular Service in Australia, 1857–1917 (in Russian). Moscow: Mezhdunarodnye otnosheniya. p. 345. ISBN 978-5-7133-1458-3.
- Kevin Windle, Elena Govor and Alexander Massov, ed. (2016). From St Petersburg to Port Jackson. Russian Travellers' Tales of Australia, 1807-1912. Melbourne: Australian Scholarly. p. 291. ISBN 978-1-925333-64-0.
- Alexander Massov, Marina Pollard and Kevin Windle, ed. (2018). A New Rival State? Australia in Tsarist Diplomatic Communications. Canberra: ANU Press. p. 353. doi:10.22459/NRS.10.2018. ISBN 978-1-76046228-4.

=== Selected articles ===
- Massov A. Ya. (1994). "Correspondence between N.N. Miklouho-Maclay and Russian Foreign Minister N.K. Giers about military preparations and the political situation in Australia and Oceania" (PDF). Countries and Peoples of the East (in Russian). XXVIII. St Petersburg: Peterburgskoe Vostokovedenie: 204–223.
- Massov A. Ya. (1997). ""Russian threat" as a factor in the domestic political development of English settler colonies in Australia in the second half of the 19th century". Klio (in Russian) (2): 19–24.
- Massov A. Ya. (2002). "Russian sources on the history of Australia in the second half of the 19th century". Vostok. Afro-aziatskie Obshchestva: Istoriya I Sovremennost' (in Russian) (6): 151–161.
- Massov A. (2006). "The Visit of the Russian Sloop Neva to Sydney in 1807: 200 Years of Russian-Australian Contacts" (PDF). Australian Slavonic and East European Studies. 20 (1–2): 203–214.
- Massov A. (2008). "Lachlan Macquarie in Russia" (PDF). Australian Slavonic and East European Studies. 22 (1–2): 45–59.
- Massov A. Ya. (2011). "Activities of Russian consuls in Australia for the protection of interests of Russian subjects and immigrants (1857-1917)". Oikumena. Regional Studies (in Russian) (1): 33–42.
- Massov A. Ya. (2013). "Unknown autograph of N.N. Miklouho-Maclay". Ethnographic Review (in Russian) (4): 111–117.
- Kanevskaya G. I., Massov A. Ya. (2017). "Australian historiography of Russian immigration to the fifth continent". Berega. Informatsionno-analiticheskiy Sbornik O Russkom Zarubezh'e (in Russian). 21. St Petersburg: Information and Cultural Centre "Russian Emigration": 5–12.
- Massov A. Ya. (2021). "Establishment of the All-Russian Association of South Pacific Researchers and Prospects for Studying the South Pacific". Klio (in Russian) (7): 145–151.
- Massov A. Ya. (2022). ""Red Flag Riots" in Brisbane in 1919: an explosion of social contradictions or ethnic clashes?". Nansen Readings 2020 (in Russian). St Petersburg: Northern Star: 41–53.
- Massov A. Ya. (2023). "A.P. Shabelsky – Russian researcher of Australia" (PDF). Russia and the Pacific (in Russian) (1): 24–37.

=== Educational and methodological publications ===
- A. Ya. Massov, ed. (2002). Questions of General History of the 20th Century in the Course of National History. Textbook (in Russian). St Petersburg: IMISP. p. 156. ISBN 5-8447-0018-X.
- Germanchuk V. P., Massov A. Ya. (2002). V. F. Finogenov (ed.). History of the Great Geographical Discoveries. Textbook (in Russian). St Petersburg: SMTU. p. 52.
- A. Ya. Massov, ed. (2008). History of Science and Technology. Textbook (in Russian). St Petersburg: SMTU. p. 188. ISBN 978-5-88303-432-8.
- A. Ya. Massov, ed. (2020). Current Issues in the History of the Great Patriotic War. The battle for Leningrad (in Russian). St Petersburg: SMTU. p. 104.
- A. Ya. Massov, ed. (2022). When Young Russia Matured with the Genius of Peter. Textbook (in Russian). St Petersburg: SMTU. p. 104.

== Reception and reviews ==
Massov's works have been widely discussed in both Russian and international scholarship. His co-edited documentary collection A New Rival State? Australia in Tsarist Diplomatic Communications (2018) received attention in leading journals. In Australian Slavonic and East European Studies (ASEES), Natalia Batova described it as "a vivid portrayal of Russian consuls in Australia and their diplomatic activities". Writing in The Slavonic and East European Review, historian T. G. Otte characterised the volume as "a very useful and expertly edited collection of diplomatic sources" valuable for the study of Russian imperial policy in the Pacific. A detailed review by Natalia Skorobogatykh in Vostok (Oriens) likewise highlighted the book's contribution to understanding Russia's diplomatic engagement with Australia.

The collective monograph From St Petersburg to Port Jackson. Russian Travellers' Tales of Australia, 1807–1912 (2016), co-edited with Kevin Windle and Elena Govor, was noted in several international reviews. J. L. Black in Canadian Slavonic Papers praised it as "a valuable and engaging source on cross-cultural encounters". The book was also reviewed in the New Zealand Slavonic Journal and in The Russian Review by Theophilus C. Prousis, who highlighted its contribution to Russian-Australian studies. In the general literary sphere, historian Sheila Fitzpatrick selected it for Australian Book Review's "Books of the Year", calling it "a treasure trove for anyone with a weakness for ship's captains' and spunky young Russian ladies' impressions of our native land".

Earlier, the international volume Encounters under the Southern Cross: Two Centuries of Russian-Australian Relations, 1807–2007 (2007), edited by Massov, John McNair, and Thomas Poole, was reviewed in Klio and Australian Slavonic and East European Studies journals. David N. Wells in ASEES noted its broad scope and scholarly significance for the bicentenary of Russian–Australian contacts.

His Russian-language collections, such as Russian Consular Service in Australia, 1857–1917 (2014), also attracted multiple academic reviews in Vostok (Oriens), Russia and the Pacific, IKBFU's Vestnik and other journals, which stressed the importance of the archival materials first introduced into scholarly use. In a separate review in Vostok (Oriens), N. S. Skorobogatykh emphasised Massov's engaging style and the combination of rigorous analysis with vivid detail in reconstructing Russian naval visits to Melbourne, calling his works "consistently captivating".

Massov's works on the activities of Nikolai Miklouho-Maclay have also received high praise. In particular, Massov's article on the legacy of Miklouho-Maclay, "The Unknown Autograph of N. N. Miklouho-Maclay", was noted in Archaeology, Ethnology & Anthropology of Eurasia, where it was described as "extremely interesting and pioneering", with Massov's conclusions on Maclay's scientific views characterised as innovative within international scholarship.

== Awards and honours ==
- Honorary Worker of Higher Professional Education of the Russian Federation
