= Italian Australians =

Australian citizens of Italian descent

Italo-australiani (Italian)

Total population
- 1,108,364 (by ancestry, 2021) (4.4% of the Australian population); 171,520 (by birth, 2021)

Regions with significant populations
- Throughout Australia, most notably in Melbourne and Sydney, though less common in Tasmania, the Northern Territory, the Australian Capital Territory and parts of Queensland

Languages
- Australian English · Italian and Italian dialects · Italo-Australian dialect

Religion
- Christianity (predominantly Roman Catholic)

Related ethnic groups
- Italians, Italian New Zealanders, Italian Americans, Italian Canadians, Italian South Africans, Italian British

Italian Australians (Italian: italo-australiani) are Australian-born citizens who are fully or partially of Italian descent, whose ancestors were Italians who emigrated to Australia during the Italian diaspora, or Italian-born people in Australia.

Italian Australians constitute the sixth largest ancestry group in Australia, and one of the largest groups in the global Italian diaspora. At the 2021 census, 1,108,364 Australian residents nominated Italian ancestry (whether alone or in combination with another ancestry), representing 4.4% of the Australian population. The 2021 census found that 171,520 were born in Italy.

In 2021, there were 228,042 Australian residents who spoke Italian at home. The Italo-Australian dialect is prominent among Italian Australians who use the Italian language.

== History ==
=== Early history ===
Italians have been arriving in Australia in a limited number since before the First Fleet. Two individuals of Italian descent served on board the Endeavour when Captain James Cook arrived in Australia in 1770. Giuseppe Tuzi was among the convicts transported to Australia by the British in the First Fleet. Another early notable arrival, for his participation in Australian politics, was Raffaello Carboni who in 1853 participated with other miners in the uprising of Eureka Stockade and wrote the only complete eye-witness account of the uprising. This migration of northern Italian middle class professionals to Australia was spurred by the persecution from Austrian authorities – who controlled most of the northern regions of Italy until 1860 – especially after the failure of the revolts in many European cities in the 1840s and 1850s. As stated by D'Aprano in his work on the first Italian migrants in Victoria:

We find some Italian artisans in Melbourne and other colonies already in the 1840s, and 1841s, many of whom had participated in the defeated revolts against the despotic rulers of Modena, Naples, Venice, Milan, Bologna, Rome and other cities. They came to Australia to seek a better and more efficient life.

Through the 1840s and 1850s, the number of Italian migrants of peasant background who came for economic reasons increased. Nevertheless, they did not come from the landless, poverty-stricken agricultural working class but from rural families with at least sufficient means to pay their fare to Australia. Furthermore, in the late 1850s, some 2,000 Swiss Italians migrated to the Victorian goldfields.

The number of Italians who arrived in Australia remained small during the whole of the nineteenth century. The voyage was costly and complex, as no direct shipping link existed between the two countries until the late 1890s. The length of the voyage was over two months before the opening of the Suez Canal. Italian migrants who intended to leave for Australia had to use German shipping lines that called at the ports of Genoa and Naples no more than once a month. Therefore, other overseas destinations such as the United States and the Latin American countries proved much more attractive, thus allowing the establishment of migration patterns more quickly and drawing far greater numbers.

Nevertheless, the Victorian gold rush of the 1850s attracted thousands of Italians and Swiss Italians to Australia. The drain on the labour supply occasioned by the gold rush caused Australia to also seek workmen from Europe for land use and the development of cultivation, both in New South Wales and Queensland. Unfortunately, the number of Italians who joined the Victorian gold mines is obscure, and until 1871 Italians did not receive a special place in any Australian census figures. By 1881, the first year of census figures on Italian migrants in all States, there were 521 Italians (representing 0.066% of the total population) in New South Wales, and 947 (0.10%) in Victoria, of whom one-third were in Melbourne and the rest were in the goldfields. Queensland had 250 Italians, South Australia 141, Tasmania 11 and Western Australia just 10. Such figures, from Australian sources, correspond to similar figures from Italian sources.

While Italians in Australia were less than 2,000, they tended to increase, because they were attracted by the easy possibility to settle in areas capable of intense agricultural exploitation. In this regard, it must be borne in mind again that in the early 1880s Italy was facing a strong economic crisis, which was going to push a hundred thousand Italians to seek a better life abroad.

In addition, even Australian travellers, like Randolph Bedford, who visited Italy in the 1870s and 1880s, admitted the convenience of having a larger intake of Italian workers into Australia. Bedford stated that Italians would adjust to the Australian climate better than the "pale" English migrant. As the job opportunities attracted so many British people to the colonies to be employed in agriculture, certainly the Italian peasant, accustomed to be a hard-worker, "frugal and sober", would be a very good immigrant for the Australia soil. Many Italian immigrants had extensive knowledge of Mediterranean-style farming techniques, which were better suited to cultivating Australia's harsh interior than the Northern-European methods in use previous to their arrival.

Since the early 1880s, due to the socioeconomic situation in Italy and the abundant opportunities to settle in Australia as farmers, skilled or semi-skilled artisans and labourers, the number of Italians who left for Australia increased.

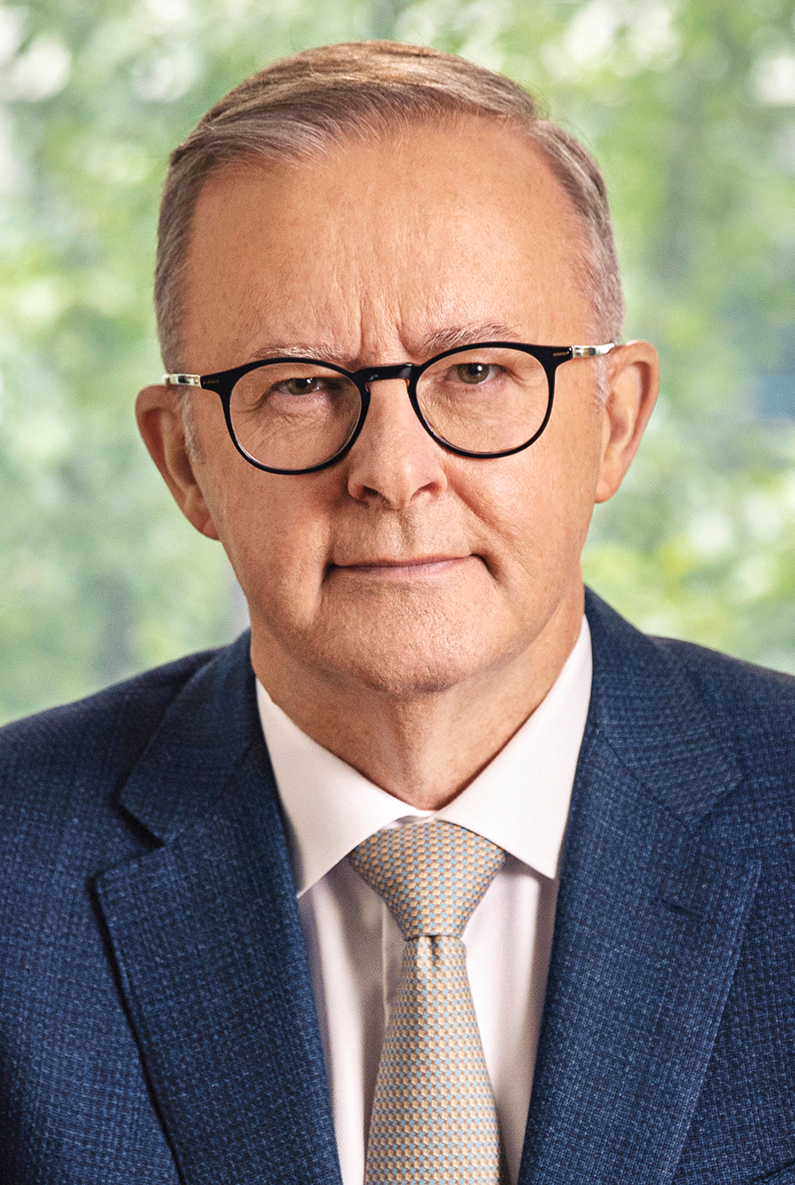
Anthony Albanese, Prime Minister of Australia since 2022

In 1881, over 200 foreign immigrants, of whom a considerable number were Italians from Northern Italy, arrived in Sydney. They were the survivors from Marquis de Ray's ill-fated attempt at founding a colony, Nouvelle France, in New Ireland, which later became part of Germany's New Guinea Protectorate. Many of them took up a conditional purchase farm of 16 hectares (40 acres) near Woodburn in the Northern Rivers District at what was subsequently known as New Italy. By the mid-1880s, about 50 holdings of an aggregate area of more than 1,200 hectares (3,000 acres) were under occupation, and the Italian population of New Italy has increased to 250. In this respect, Lyng reported: "The land was very poor and heavily timbered and had been passed over by local settlers. However, the Italians set to work and by great industry and thrift succeeded in clearing some of the land and making it productive. ... Besides, working on their own properties the settlers were engaged in the sugar industry, in timber squaring, grass seed gathering, and other miscellaneous work".

In 1883, a commercial Treaty between the United Kingdom and Italy was signed, allowing Italian subjects freedom of entry, travel and residence, and the rights to acquire and own property and to carry on business activities. This Agreement certainly favoured the arrival in Australia of many more Italians.

=== In working society, 1890–1920 ===
1891 was the year in Queensland in which over 300 peasants from northern Italy were scheduled to arrive, as the first contingent to replace over 60,000 Kanakas brought to north Queensland since the mid-nineteenth century as exploitable labour for the sugarcane plantations. Until the early 1890s, Italians had been practically an unknown—although very modest—quantity in Queensland. As a result of the new White Australia policy, the Kanakas were now being deported. While employment was guaranteed, wages were low and fixed. The deciding factor in the whole matter was the plight of the sugar industry: docile gang labour was essential, and the "frugal" Italian peasants were perfectly suited for such employment.

The Australian Workers' Union claimed that Italians would work harder than the Kanakas for lower pay and take away work from Australians, and over 8,000 Queenslanders signed a petition requesting the project to be cancelled. Nonetheless, more Italian migrants arrived and soon nominated friends and relatives still in Italy. They slowly acquired a large number of sugar-cane plantations and gradually set up thriving Italian communities in north Queensland around the towns of Ayr and Innisfail.

A few years later, Italians were again the subject of public discussion in Western Australia. The gold rush of the early 1890s in Western Australia and the subsequent labour disputes at the mines had belatedly attracted Italians in large number, both from Victoria and Italy itself. Most of them were unskilled and therefore usually employed on the surface of the mines, or cutting, loading and carting wood nearby. Pyke so described the situation:

Popular agitation was prompted mainly by growing unemployment; even Italians had begun to write home about it. Italians, however, could still be readily employed, often in preference to other workmen, because of the contract system of employment. They had the virtue of comparative docility and temperance and the ability to work in the hottest of weather; consequently, they were sought after by contractors, a few of whom were Italians themselves.

As previously stated with respect to the temporary migration of Tuscan migrants, Italians worked hard, and most saved steadily, by a simple a primitive mode of life, to buy land either in hospitable Australian urban areas or in the Italian community of origin. They were clearly "the better men for the worse job".

The early 1890s is a turning point in the Australian attitude toward Italian immigration. Pyke stated:

The Labour Movement was against Italian immigration to all areas, and particularly to these industries, inasmuch as it swelled the labour market and increased competition, thereby putting employers in the enviable position of being able to pick and choose and giving employees who wanted to labour and needed work, the opportunity of paying for employment and accepting low wages.

Sugarcane activities in Queensland and mining in Western Australia—where most of the Italians were employed—became the targets of the Labour movement. As O'Connor reports in his work on the first Italian settlements, when Italians began to compete with Britons for work on the Kalgoorlie goldfields, the Parliament was warned that they, along with Greeks and Hungarians, "had become a greater pest in the United States than the coloured races". In other words, during the 1890s, a political and social alliance was formed between the Australian Labor Party and the Anglo-Celtic Australian working class to react to Italian immigrants, with particular reference to northern and central Italian workers who lowered the level of wages.

Even in the Italian literature of the 1890s and early 1900s on travel reports and descriptions of Australia, there are notes about these frictions. The Italian Geographical Society (Societa' Geografica Italiana) reported as follows about the few Italian settlements in Australia:

Nella maggior parte dei casi l'operaio (italiano) vive sotto la tenda, così chiunque non sia dedito all'ubriachezza (cosa troppo comune in questi paesi, ma non fra i nostri connazionali) può facilmente risparmiare la metà del suo salario. I nostri italiani, economi per eccellenza, risparmiano talvolta anche di più.
(In the great majority of cases, Italian labourers live in tents, so, whoever does not get drunk (which is such a common habit in this country, except amongst Italians) can easily save up to half his wage. Our Italians, extremely thrifty, save even more than that).

Among the many observations about his journey to Australia, the Italian priest and writer, Giuseppe Capra, notes in 1909:

In questi ultimi cinquantacinque anni, in cui l'Italiano emigrò più numeroso in Australia, la sua condotta morale è superiore a quella delle altre nazionalità che qui sono rappresentate, l'inglese compreso. Amante del lavoro, del risparmio, intelligente, sobrio, è sempre ricercatissimo: l'unico contrasto che talvolta incontra è quello dell'operaio inglese, che, forte della sua origine, si fa preferire e guarda al suo concorrente con viso arcigno, temendo, senza alcun fondamento, che l'Italiano si presti a lavori per salari inferiori ai proprii.
(During these recent 55 years, when Italians migrated more to Australia, their moral conduct had been superior to that of the many other nationals here represented, British included. Italians are work and savings-oriented, intelligent, sober and very much sought after. The only hostility comes from the British labourers who, confident of their origin, look at their Italian competitors with a surly mood, because they are afraid—without any evidence—that Italians could work for lower wages than theirs).

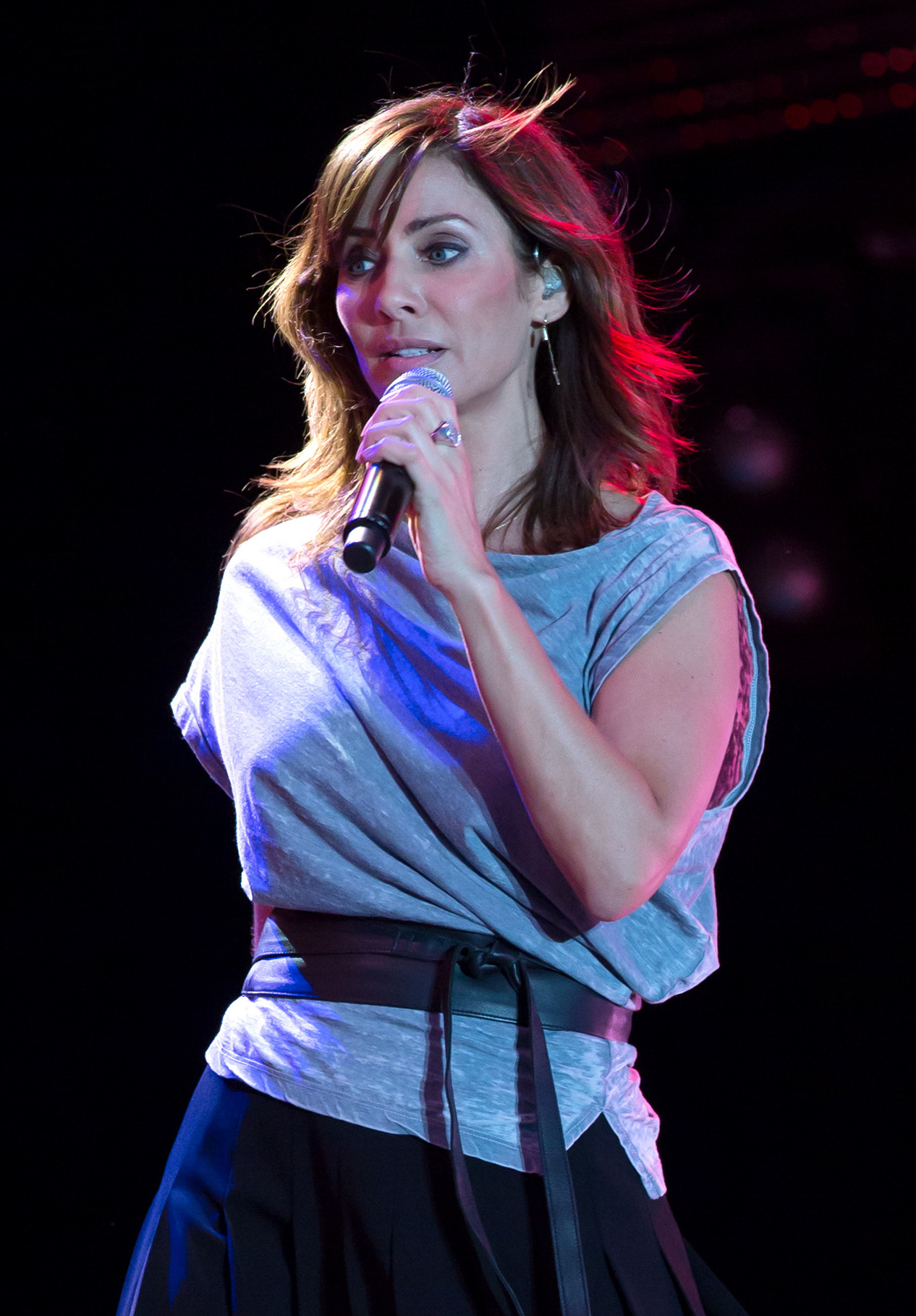
Natalie Imbruglia

Frictions between the established Australian working class and the newcomers suggest that, during periods of economic crisis and unemployment, immigration acted as a "tool of division and attack" by international capitalism to working class organisations. There were Italians in occupations other than in the sugarcane industry and mining. In Western Australia, fishing was next in popularity, followed by the usual urban pursuits now associated with Italians of peasant origin, such as market gardening, the keeping of restaurants and wine shops and the sale of fruit and vegetables.

As Cresciani has explained in his comprehensive study of Italian settlements in the early decades of the twentieth century, it was the small size and the type of the Italian settlement that also worked against a wider involvement of Italian migrants with organised labour.

"Most Italians were scattered in the countryside, on the goldfields, in the mines. As agricultural workers, fruit pickers, farmers, tobacco growers, canecutters. The distance and the lack of communication prevented them from organising themselves. Those in the cities, mainly greengrocers, market gardeners and labourers, because of the sheer lack of interest and capacity to understand the advantages that a political organisation would bring, kept themselves aloof from any active role in politics and from the people who were advocating it. Also, many migrants were seasonal workers, never stopping for long at any one place, thus making it difficult for them to take part in social or political activities". By the early 1900s, there were over 5,000 Italians in Australia in a remarkable variety of occupations. According to the 1911 Census, there were 6,719 residents who had been born in Italy. Of these, 5,543 were males, while 2,683 had become naturalised. No less than 2,600 were in Western Australia.

One of the most significant policy matters that the new Parliament of Australia had to consider after it opened in 1901 was immigration. Later that year, the Attorney-General, Alfred Deakin, introduced and passed into legislation the Immigration Restriction Act 1901 and the allied Pacific Island Labourers Act. The goal was to ensure the White Australia policy by controlling entry into Australia and—by the latter—repatriating coloured labour from the Pacific Islands. The concept was meant to safeguard the social "white" purity and protect wage standards against cheap coloured labour.

As the Restriction Act passed into legislation, there was some confusion as to whether Italians should be let into the country or kept out by means of the "Dictation test" provisions, as stated into the Act. The Act did not specify a translation but rather a dictation in a European language, the purpose of the test being to keep non-Europeans out of Australia, as a deterrent to unwanted immigrants. Although the test was initially to be administered in English, it was then changed to any European language, "mainly through Labour insistence". Such a firmly sustained system to select entries into Australia that it remained on the statute books until 1958, when it was replaced by a system of entry permits.

Nevertheless, in the early 1900s, some Italians calling at Fremantle and other Australian ports were refused admission under the provisions of the Act. These latter cases might be indicative of the fact that Western Australia shared the xenophobia of the rest of the world. The reaction was certainly associated with the so-called "Awakening of Asia" and 'Yellow Peril', which were not exclusively Australian terms. As reported: "Such concepts combined to produce in Europe a suspicion that the traditional European supremacy around the globe was coming to an end. In Australia that eventually was seen as, or made to appear, a more immediate threatening".

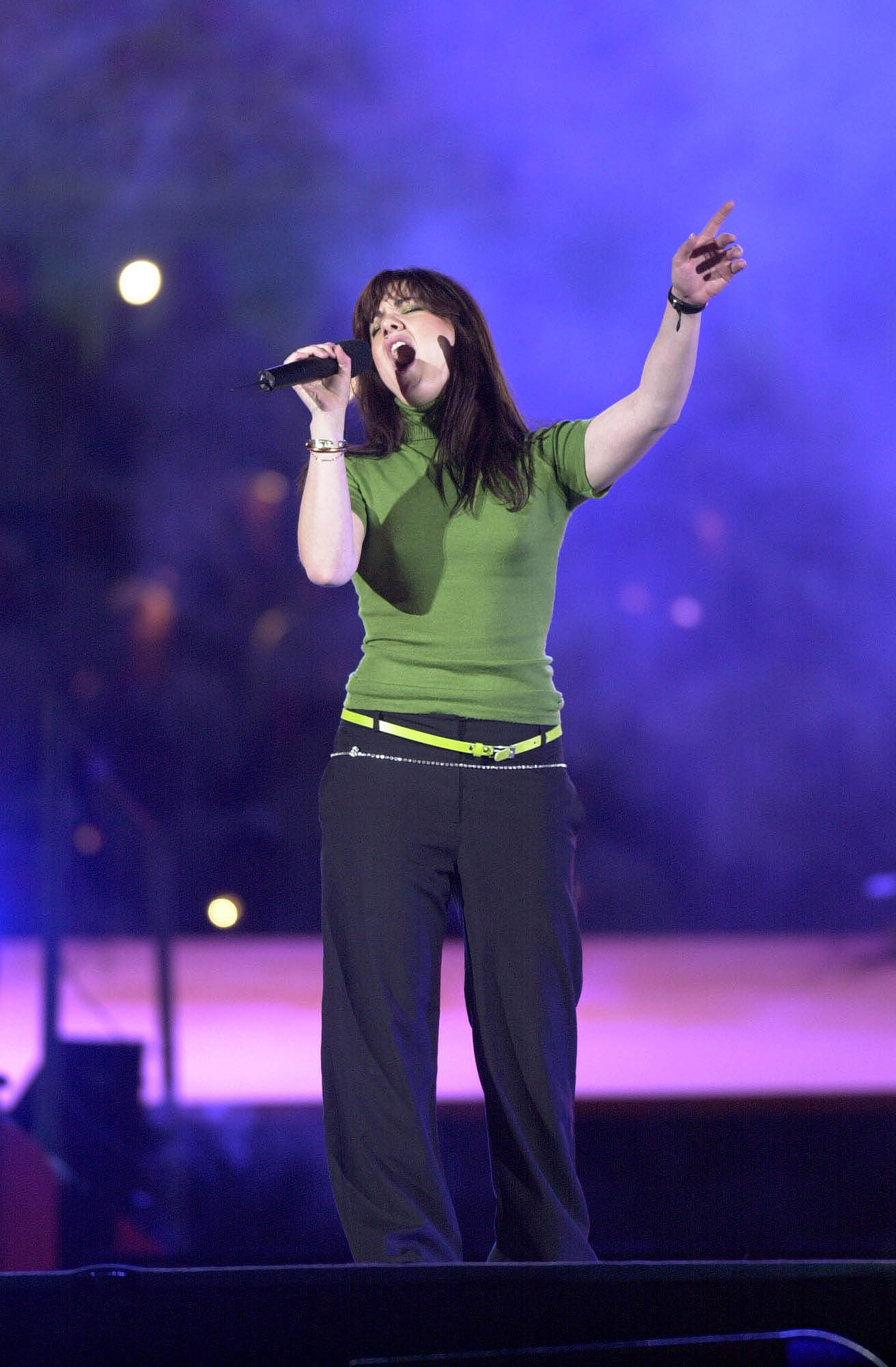
Vanessa Amorosi

Fuelled both by the British-European feeling of loss of supremacy and the fears of the Australian Labor Party in working sectors where labourers were not exclusively Anglo-Celtic, anti-Italian sentiments gathered momentum in the United States in the early 1900s, in the wake of Italian mass migration. Such attitudes also flourished in Australia, as it has been reported with respect to the Queensland sugar-cane industry and Western Australian mines.

Nevertheless, a new attempt to found an Italian colony in Western Australia took place in 1906, when the western state offered to host about 100 Italian peasant families to settle in the south-western rural corner of Western Australia. A delegation of a few northern Italian farmers led by Leopoldo Zunini, an Italian career diplomat, visited most of these rural areas. Although his report on soil fertility, quality of cattle to graze, transport and accommodation for the Italian farmers was extremely positive and enthusiastic, the settlement scheme was not carried out. Again, Western Australia public opinion opposed the creation of an exclusively Italian settlement, possibly caused by a mounting anti-Italian sentiment fuelled by the outlined episodes of confrontation between the Labour movement and the cheap labour cost offered by Italian migrants.

=== Growth of the community, 1921–1945 ===
Italian migration to Australia increased markedly only after heavy restrictions were placed on Italians' entry to the United States. More than two million Italian migrants entered the United States from the start of the 20th century to the outbreak of the First World War, whereas only about twelve thousand Italians had entered Australia in the same period. In 1917, while war was still on, the United States introduced a Literacy Act to curtail its immigration flow—which had reached a high number in the years immediately before the war—and Canada enacted similar legislation two years later. In 1921, United States policy became even stricter, with the establishment of a quota system that limited the total intake of Italian immigrants in any one year to about 41,000 (calculated as 3% of the number of Italians residing in the United States in 1910). Furthermore, in 1924, the figures related to the entry of Italians were cut almost to zero, as they were meant to represent the 2% of the Italian component in the United States in 1890.

Such severe restrictions meant that part of the great post-war stream of migrants from Italy was progressively diverted to Australia. Nevertheless, the way Italian migrants were conceived by Australian society was not going to change after its perception had formed in the early 1900s. With respect to this attitude, MacDonald wrote: "Italian immigration became the largest non-British movement after the entry of Melanesians and Asians was stopped by the new federal government in 1902. This put Italians at the bottom of the Australian "racial totem pole", just above other Southern Europeans and Aborigines. The volume of arrivals, the proportion of settlers in the total population of Australia, and the size of Italian agglomerated settlements were trivial by international standards. Yet the establishment of fifty Italian households within a radius of five miles (8.0 km) or the employment of twenty Italians on a job were cause for alarm in Australian eyes, The "inferiority" of Italians was generally seen in racist terms as well as specifically in terms of their threatening to compete with labour of British stock because of their "primitive" way of life".

This attitude was also present in other English speaking countries, as Porter reported for Canada. In his classical study of Italians in North Queensland, Douglass suggests other factors affecting such racist attitudes, and reports a summary of the Commonwealth Parliamentary debate of 1927: "The image of the Italian was nourished by the stereotype of the southerner, and particularly the Sicilian. Regardless of its veracity, it could be applied to only a minority of the new arrivals since, by Italian Government estimates, fully two-fifths of its emigrants to Australia were from the Veneto and another two-fifths were drawn from the Piedmont, Lombardy and Tuscany regions. Only one-fifth were from Sicily and Calabria".

Although the Australian attitude towards Italians was not friendly, since the early 1920s Italian migrants began to arrive in Australia in notable numbers. While the Australian Census of 1921 recorded 8,135 Italians residing in the country, during the years 1922–1925 another 15,000 arrived and, again, a similar number of Italians reached Australia during the period 1926–1930.

Together with the entry restrictions adopted by the United States, another factor that increased Italian emigration in the early 1920s was the rise of Fascism in Italy in 1922. Gradually, the arrays of migrants became formed also by a minor component of political opponents to Fascism, generally peasants of the northern Italian regions, who chose Australia as their destination. In his study on Italian migration to South Australia, O'Connor even reports on the presence, in 1926, in Adelaide of a dangerous anarchist "subversive" from the village of Capoliveri, in the Tuscan Island of Elba, one Giacomo Argenti.

The concern of Benito Mussolini about the high emigration figures of the mid-1920s pushed the Fascist government's decision in 1927 to stop all migration to overseas countries, with rarely permitted exceptions, apart from female and minor close relatives (under-age sons, unmarried daughters of any age, parents and unmarried sisters without family in Italy) dependent on residents abroad. In the early 1920s Italians had found that it was not difficult to enter Australia, as there were no visa requirements. The Amending Immigration Act of 1924 prohibited the entry of migrants unless they had a written guarantee completed by a sponsor, an Atto di richiamo ('Call notice'). In this case, any migrant could come to Australia free of charge. Without a sponsor, the required landing money was ten pounds until 1924 and forty since 1925. O'Connor stated: "In 1928, as the number of arrivals increased, a 'gentleman's agreement' between Italy and Australia limited the entry of Italians to no more than 2% of British arrivals, amounting to a maximum of 3,000 Italians per year".

Italian nationalism acted as an element of reaction and defence to the Australian environment. By the early 1930s, even Italian diplomatic activity in Australia—as a direct expression of the Fascist government—became more incisive and oriented to make more and more Fascist proselytes among Italians. Migrants were invited to become members of the fascist political organisations of Australia, to come to fascist meetings and eventually to return to Italy, to consent to serve in the Italian armed forces, both in view of the Italian war campaign of Ethiopia (1936) and, later, at the outbreak of World War II.

Italians had arrived in Australia in consistent numbers all through the 1920s and 1930s, regardless of the internal and external factors affecting either their departure or their stay in Australia. Entry conditions of Italian migrants became stricter in countries of more popular destinations as the United States, and Italian Fascist authorities tightened the departure of migrants. At the same time, in Australia, the attitude towards Italians had been hostile to their settlements and work patterns. In addition, Australia, like the United States and most western countries, was hit by the economic Depression of 1929, which caused a serious recession during the following years.

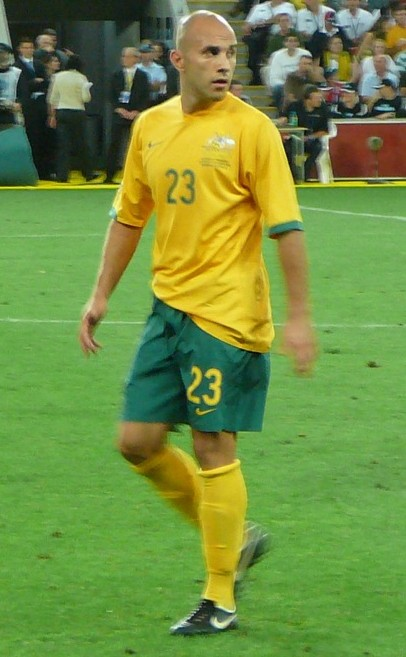
Mark Bresciano

Even Australian legislation was changed consequently. Amendments to the Immigration Restriction Act in 1932 were more drastic and aimed at more effectively controlling the entry of "white aliens" into Australia. The amendment extended the landing permit system to all categories of immigrants, while before was applicable only to immigrants with a maintenance guarantee. The goal was to limit immigrants from competing in the local labour market to the detriment of the local unemployed. At the same time, the power to apply the dictation test was still available for up to five years to restrict the landing of an immigrant whose admission was not desired.

The economic depression ignited another social tension which fanned into racial hatred again in 1934. In the gold-mining city of Kalgoorlie, Western Australia, an Australian who had expressed defamatory remarks about Italians in an Italian-owned hotel was knocked dead by the barman. This accident sparked the resentment of many Australian miners against Italians residing in Kalgoorlie, which culminated in two days of riots. A raging crowd of miners devastated and burnt many shops and private abodes of Italians and other Southern Europeans in Boulder and Kalgoorlie and pushed hundreds of Italian migrants to shelter in the surrounding countryside. Notwithstanding the condemnation of the fact on media, the riots did not modify the attitude of public opinion toward Italians in general.

In the 1930s, the Australian community maintained a perception of cultural inferiority of Italians that owed much to longer-term racial conceptions and which were confirmed by the lifestyle of the migrants. As observed by Bertola in his study of the riots, racism towards Italians lay in "their apparent willingness to be used in efforts to drive down wages and conditions, and their inability to transcend the boundaries that separated them from the host culture".

This was the umpteenth episode that without doubt pushed the notable number of Italians now working and residing in Australia to sympathise with Fascism and devote to the narrow circle of the Italian associations and the close relations of the family. In the late 1930s, a Fascist traveller to Australia so describes the life and work of Italians in the Western Australian mines:

È la dura quotidiana fatica del lavoro e la resistenza alle lotte degli Australiani che essi debbono sostenere per il prestigio di essere Italiani di Mussolini. [...] Gli Italiani formarono quel fronte unico di resistenza che va considerato una delle più belle vittorie del fascismo in terra straniera. Altra cosa è fare gl'Italiani in Italia altra è all'estero, dove chi ti dà da mangiare dimentica che tu lavori per lui, e solo per questo crede di essere padrone delle tue braccia e del tuo spirito.
(Italians have to sustain the daily hard work and the resistance to the claims of Australians, to bear the prestige to be Italians of Mussolini. [...] Italians formed that strong front of resistance, which can be considered one of the best victories of fascism in foreign land. One thing is to form Italians in Italy and another is abroad, where those who feed you forget that you all work for them, and just for this reason they think to be the owners of your arms and spirits).

Nevertheless, the Australia Census of 1933 claimed that 26,756 (against the 8,000 of 1921) were born in Italy. Since that year, Italy-born residents in Australia began to represent the first non-English speaking ethnic group of the country, replacing Germans and Chinese. Notwithstanding, a very high proportion of them (20,064) were male. Many Italian male migrants, who had in fact left Italy for Australia during the late 1920s and early 1930s, were joined by wives, working-age sons, daughters, brothers and sisters in the late 1930s. This pattern can be interpreted as a "defence" from both the perceived hostile Australia environment and the political turmoil of pre-war Italy.

Until the outbreak of World War II, there was a considerable degree of segregation between Italians and Australians. As an additional reaction, a large proportion of Italians in Australia tended to defer naturalisation (which could be granted after a period of five years of residence) until they had finally established their homes in Australia. Consequently, it is not surprising that, with the outbreak of World War II, the Australian opinion of Italian migrants naturally hardened.

The entry of Italy into the war was followed by the large-scale internment of Italians, especially in Queensland, South Australia and Western Australia. The concern in Queensland was that Italians would somehow join forces with an invading Japanese force and constitute a fifth column. Between 1940 and 1945, most of those who had not been naturalised before the war's outbreak were considered "enemy aliens", and therefore either interned or subjected to close watch, with respect to personal movements and area of employment. There were many cases of Italian-Australians who had taken out Australian citizenship also being interned. This was particularly the case in northern Queensland.

=== Post-war mass migration to Australia, 1946–1970s ===
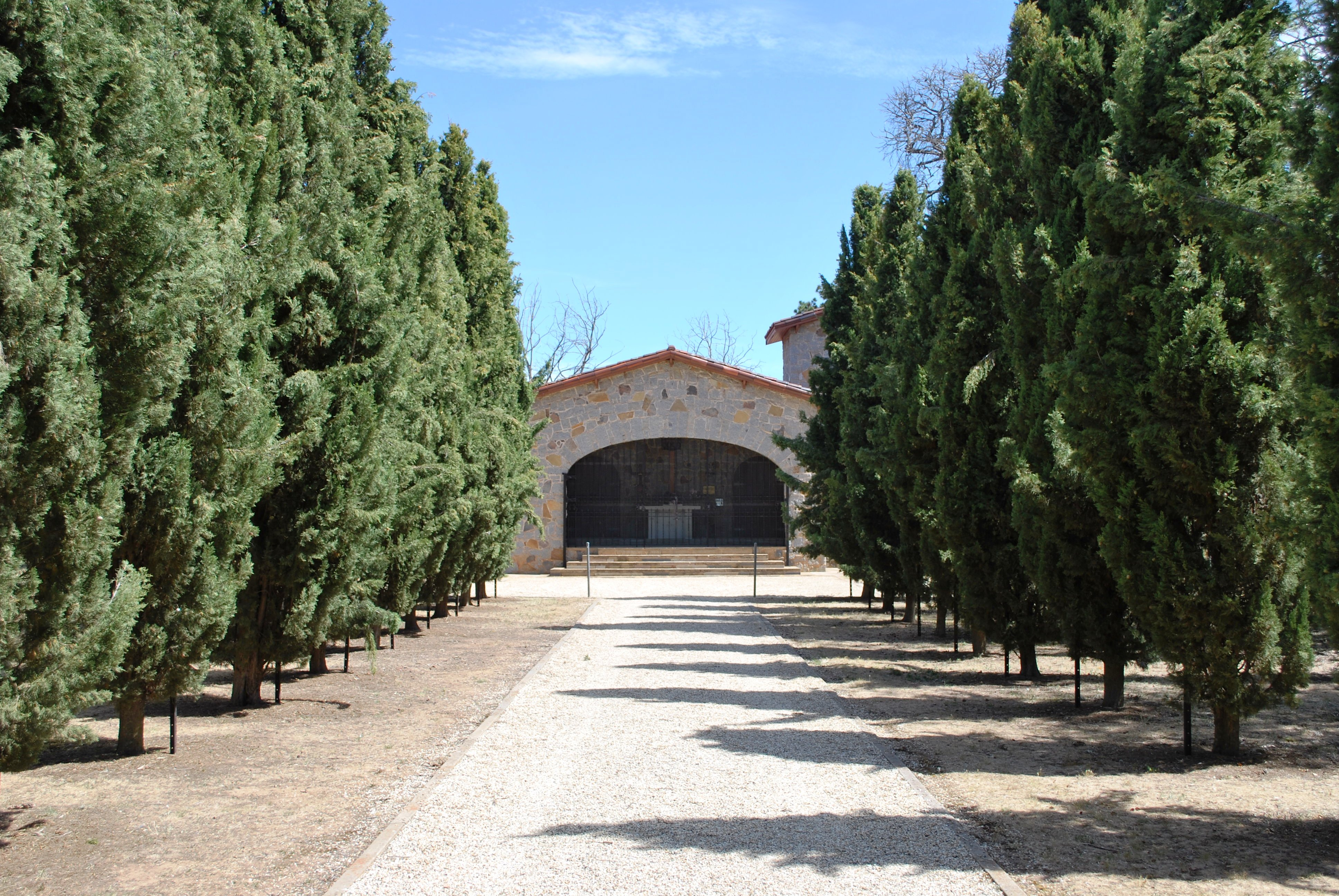
The ossario at Murchison, Victoria, a memorial to the Italian prisoners of war held in the region during World War II

During WWII, more than 18,000 Italian prisoners-of-war were sent to internment camps throughout Australia. Together with the interned "enemy aliens", after 1942 a large number of them were employed in inland farms without much surveillance. Many prisoners of war and Italian-Australian interned worked hard in farms and cattle stations, thus gaining a favourable opinion as hard and committed workers by their Australian employers. This circumstance contributed to generate an environment more agreeable – than that before the war – for the Italian post-war migration to Australia. After World War II, the attitude of Australians towards Italians gradually began to change, with the increasing appreciation of the value of Italians in the economic development of Australia. At the same time, the Italian war experience helped to destroy many of the political and sentimental attachments that Italians had previously felt towards their country. As a consequence, the end of the war encouraged the naturalisation of many Italian migrants, who had been caught up as enemy aliens at the outbreak of the world conflict.

At the end of 1947, only 21% of the Italians residing in Australia were not yet naturalised. Many of those becoming naturalised in the late 1940s did so to allay the suspicion caused by the war. Borrie wrote in his fundamental work on the assimilation of Italians in Australia:

"Naturalisation was the obvious first step towards their rehabilitation. The war had also broken many of the links with Italy, and in addition it was still difficult to secure a shipping passage to return there. But while the act of naturalization may have been an irrevocable step which in turn provided an incentive to become socially and culturally assimilated, field investigations show clearly that Italians retained many traits, particularly within the circle of the home, which were not "Australian". And naturalized or not, they were still not fully accepted by Australians".

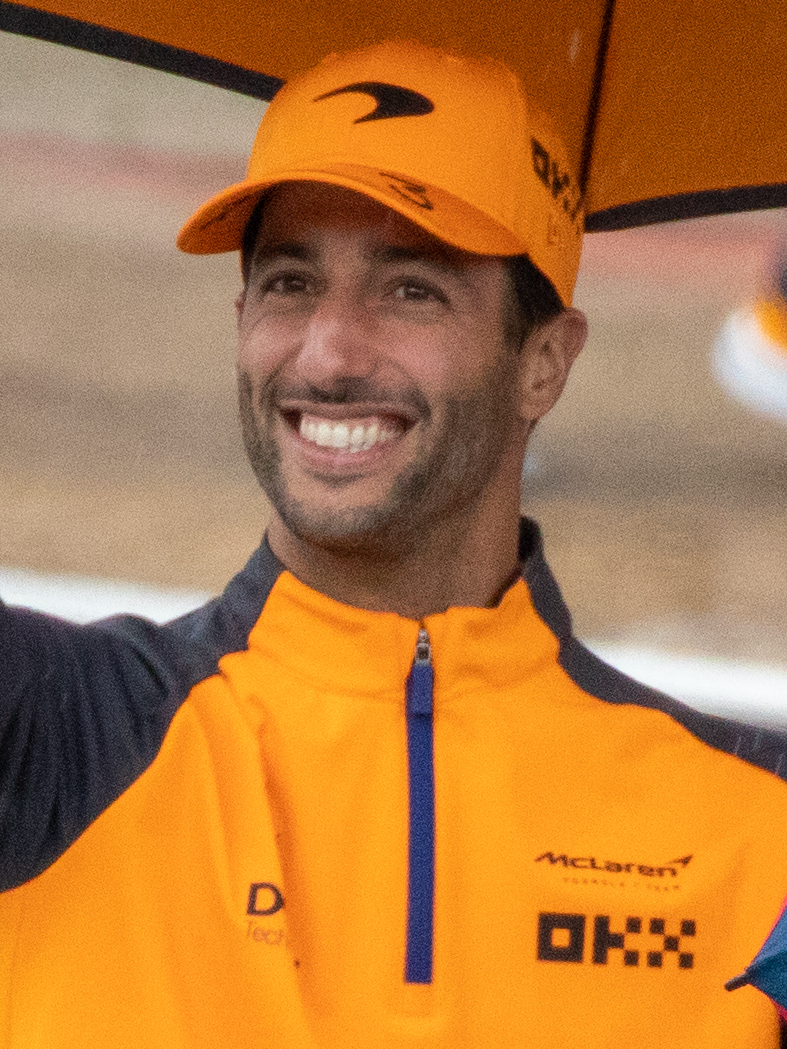
Daniel Ricciardo

Conversely, after the war experience, the Australian government embarked on the 'Populate or Perish' program, aimed to increase the population of the country for strategically important economic and military reasons. The immigration debate in postwar Australia assumed new dimensions as official policy sought a significant increase in the number and the diversity of immigrants, and to find a place for those coming from a tired and torn Europe. The war had occasioned a shift in migration patterns, pressing the need to place a large number of people who could not return to their own countries for a wide range of reasons. This was the case of over ten million people from Central and North-eastern Europe, such as Poles, Germans, Greeks, Czechs, Yugoslavs and Slovaks. An important stage in this immigration program began with the Displaced Persons Scheme in 1947, which attracted over 170,000 displaced persons to Australia.

Italy's postwar migration certainly grew out of the country's policy of industrial development. Although there had been a significant industrial growth in Italy before the war, the devastation wrought by the conflict left the structure in ruins. This factor and the return of Italian soldiers from the war fronts generated a surplus of population which turned to emigration as an alternative to poverty.

By the early 1950s, Australian authorities negotiated formal migration agreements with the Netherlands (1951), Germany and Austria (1952). They also introduced a system of personal nominations and guarantees, opened to Italians, to permit families separated by the war to come together again. In addition, the Australian and Italian governments negotiated a scheme of recruitment and assisted passages, which became fully effective in 1952. As extensively outlined by MacDonald, the chain migration process, eased by the personal nomination scheme, seemed to be more flexible than the administrative machinery of the bilateral program. Personal nominees had a guarantee of assistance and contacts at their arrival in Australia, to help migrants to evaluate all employment possibilities.

Since the mid-1950s, the Italian flow of migrants to Australia assumed a sort of mass migration. Either nominated by relatives in Australia as a major component, or as assisted migrants, a notable number of migrants left Italy for Australia. Unlike the pre-war movement, most of the migrants of the 1950s and 1960s had planned to settle permanently in Australia. Within these two decades, the number of Italians who came to Australia was so high that their number increased tenfold. Between June 1949 and July 2000, Italy was the second most common birthplace for immigrant arrivals to Australia after United Kingdom and Ireland.

	No. of arrivals July 1949 – June 2000	July 1949 – June 1959	July 1959 – June 1970	July 1970 – June 1980
Immigrant arrivals from Italy	390,810	201,428	150,669	28,800
Total immigrant arrivals	5,640,638	1,253,083	1,445,356	956,769
Percentage of immigrants from Italy	6.9%	16.1%	10.4%	3.0%

=== 21st century ===
In recent years, Australia has been witnessing a new wave of migration from Italy in numbers not seen in half a century, as thousands flee the economic hardship in Italy.

The explosion of numbers saw more than 20,000 Italians arrive in Australia in 2012–13 on temporary visas, exceeding the number of Italians that arrived in 1950–51 during the previous migration boom following World War Two.

At the 2022 federal election, Anthony Albanese was elected, becoming Australia's first Prime Minister of Italian descent.

As of 2024 David Crisafulli is the Queensland state Premier (LNP) and Lia Finocchiaro is the Northern Territory Chief Minister (CLP). Both are of Italian descent.

== Demographics ==
People with Italian ancestry as a percentage of the population in Australia divided geographically by statistical local area, as of the 2011 census

At the 2021 census, 1,108,364 people nominated Italian ancestry (whether alone or in combination with another ancestry), representing 4.4% of the Australian population. The 2021 census found that 163,326 were born in Italy. In 2021, there were 228,042 Australian residents who spoke Italian at home.

According to 2006 census data released by the Australian Bureau of Statistics, 95% of Italian born Australians recorded their religion as Christian.

As of the 2006 census, 162,107 (81.4%) speak Italian at home. Proficiency in English was self-described by census respondents as very well by 28%, well by 32%, 21% not well (18% didn't state or said not applicable).

As the level of immigration from Italy dropped significantly after the 1970s, the Australian population born in Italy is ageing and in decline. Most Italian Australians are the Australian-born descendants of Italian immigrants.

As of 2016, there were 120,791 registered Italian citizens (including those with dual citizenship) living in Australia according to the Italian constitutional referendum, 2016.

=== Geographical distribution ===
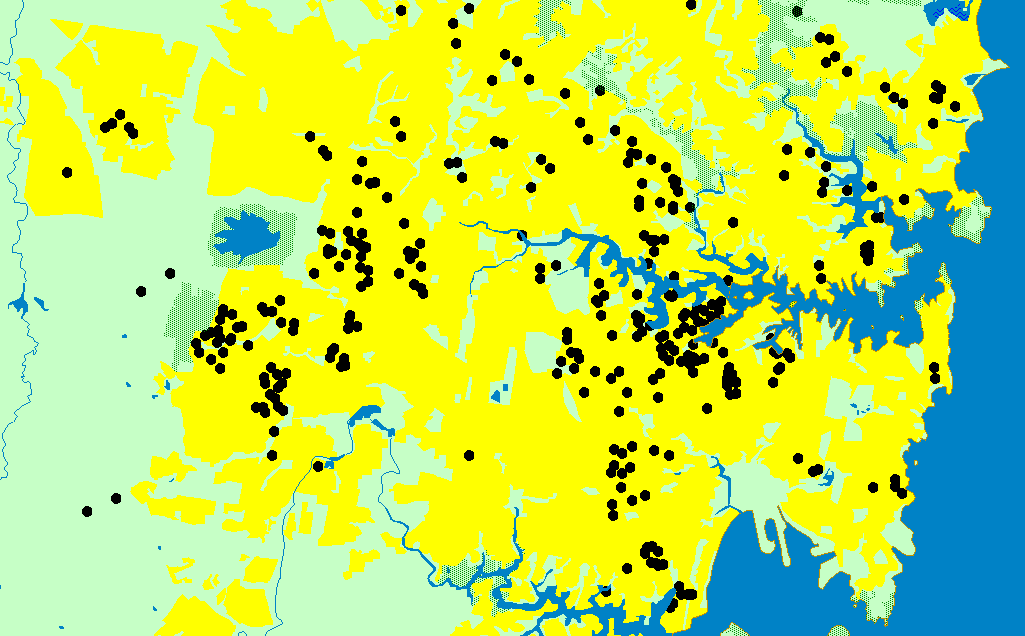
One dot denotes 100 Italy born Sydney residents.

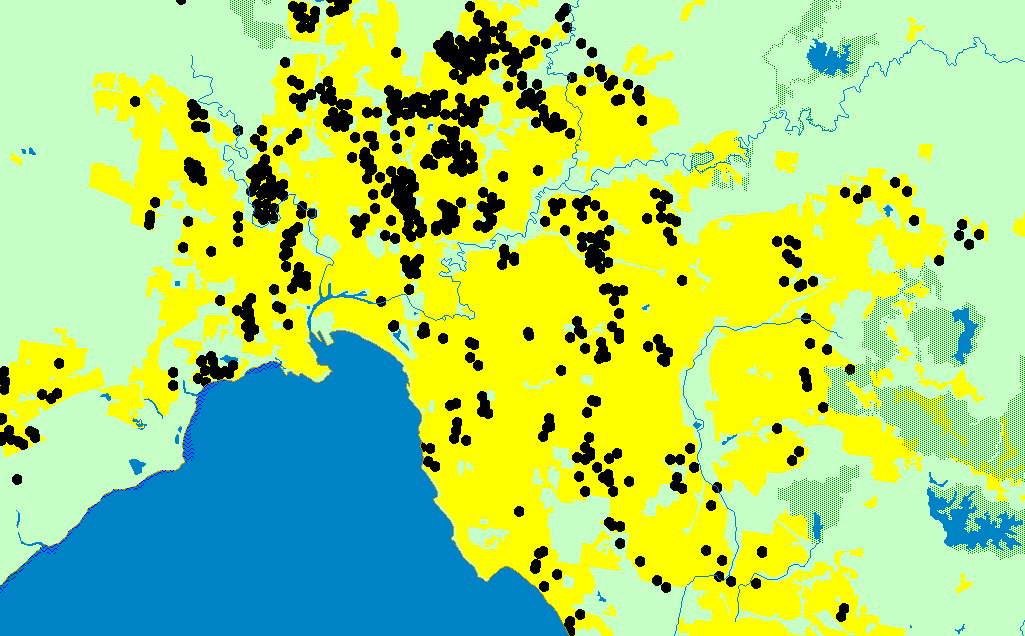
One dot denotes 100 Italy born Melbourne residents.

Italians are well represented in every Australian state, territory, town and region. At the 2021 census, states with the largest numbers of persons nominating Italian ancestry were Victoria (384,688), New South Wales (301,829), Queensland (152,571), Western Australia (137,255) and South Australia (103,914).

Most Australian residents born in Italy are now concentrated in Melbourne (73,799), Sydney (44,562), Adelaide (20,877) and Perth (18,815). Unlike other groups, the number of Italians residing in Brisbane is relatively few, with the exception of a notable distribution of Italians in Northern Queensland, as Hempel has described in her research on post-war settlement of Italian immigrants in this state. This circumstance is a consequence of the migration patterns followed by Italians in the earlier stage of their settlement in Queensland, during the 1910s, 1920s and 1930s, when the sugarcane industry and its related possibility of quick earnings attracted more "temporary" migrants in the countryside.

Conversely, in Australian cities, the Italian village or the region of origin have been significant in the formation of separate settlements or neighbourhood groupings of Italians. The way in which a population "subgroup" is distributed across an area is of importance because not only can it tell us a great deal about the pattern of life of that group, but it is also crucial in any planning of service delivering to such a community. The Italian community has very distinctive patterns of distribution that differentiate it from the total population.

As Burnley reports in his study on Italian absorption in urban Australia, some Italian concentrations in the inner suburbs of Carlton, the traditional 'Little Italy' of Melbourne, and Leichhardt, its equivalent in Sydney, were made up of several groups from geographically very circumscribed areas of Italy. Migrants from the Lipari Islands of Sicily, and from a few communities of the Province of Vicenza have formed the main Italian community core of Leichhardt, as well as Sicilians from the Province of Ragusa and the Commune of Vizzini have formed a large contingent in Brunswick, a local government authority of Melbourne now containing over 10,000 Italians.

On a smaller scale, but through similar patterns, other large communities of Italians were formed, since the first notable arrival of Italians of the 1920s and 1930s, in Adelaide, Perth and in minor cities of Victoria, New South Wales and Queensland. Most first-generation Italian migrants came to Australia by the nomination of a close relative or a friend, as forms of chain migration.

With particular reference to Western Australia, as previously stated, Italians began to arrive in more notable number after the discovery of gold in the Eastern Goldfields, in the early 1890s. The Australian Census of 1911 records the presence of over 2,000 Italians in Western Australia. Only two years before, the Italian writer Capra had visited the state and reported: "L'attuale emigrazione italiana in Australia e' poca cosa, e consta quasi esclusivamente di operai per le miniere e pel taglio della legna nella parte occidentale, e di lavoratori della canna da zucchero nel Queensland". (Present Italian migration to Australia is negligible, almost exclusively limited to miners and woodcutters in the western state, and sugarcane cutters in Queensland).

Capra details the professional distribution of Italians. Over two-thirds all Italians were employed either in mines or in the mine-related woodcutting industry (respectively about 400 and 800), both in the gold districts of Gwalia, Day Down, Coolgardie and Cue, and the forests of Karrawong and Lakeside. The remaining Italian workers were mainly involved in farming (250) and fishing (150). This work pattern of Italians in Western Australia did not change much with the more consistent migration flow of the late 1920s and early 1930s. During these two decades, Italian migrants to Australia continued to come from the north and central mountain areas of Italy, thus following a pattern of "temporary" migration that pushed them to look for jobs with potential quick remuneration, as mining and woodcutting could offer. Changes in such patterns, together with the Italian mass-migration program of the 1950s and 1960s, have already been examined. Hence, the different component of regional origin of Italians in Western Australia and, subsequently, since the late 1950s, a more composite geographical distribution of Italian migrants in both urban and rural areas of the state.

=== Religion ===
Italian Australian demography by religion (note that it includes only Italian born in Italy and not australian with an Italian background)
Religious group	2021 (Note: Religious breakdown proportions based on "Italian" ethnic or cultural origin response on the 2021 census.)		2016 (Note: Religious breakdown proportions based on "Italian" ethnic or cultural origin response on the 2016 census.)		2011 (Note: Religious breakdown proportions based on "Italian" ethnic or cultural origin response on the 2011 census.)	
Religious group	Pop.	%	Pop.	%	Pop.	%
Catholic	134,274 ▼	82.21% ▼	149,900 ▼	86.13% ▼	168,801	91.05%
Eastern Orthodox	298 ▲	0.17% ▲	190 ▼	0.11%	205	0.11%
Other Christian denomination	5,282 ▲	3.23% ▲	4,996 ▼	2.87% ▲	5,250	2.83%
(Total Christian)	139,853 ▼	85.63% ▼	155,082 ▼	89.11% ▼	174,251	93.99%
Buddhism	634 ▲	0.39% ▲	387 ▼	0.22% ▼	396	0.21%
Irreligion	18,047 ▲	11.05% ▲	12,395 ▲	7.12% ▲	6,195	3.34%
Other	191 ▲	0.12% ▲	177 ▲	0.1% ▲	147	0.08%
Hinduism	211 ▲	0.13% ▲	131 ▲	0.08% ▲	37	0.02%
Islam	442 ▲	0.27% ▲	177 ▲	0.1% ▲	150	0.08%
Judaism	132 ▲	0.08% ▲	123 ▼	0.07%	135	0.07%
Not Stated	3,822 ▼	2.34% ▼	5,576 ▲	3.2% ▲	4,099	2.21%
Total Italian Australian population	163,326 ▼	100%	174,042 ▼	100%	185,402	100%

Italian Australian demography by religion (Ancestry Included)
Religious group	2021		2016		2011	
Religious group	Pop.	%	Pop.	%	Pop.	%
Catholic	824,127 ▼	64.81% ▼	834,831 ▼	71.11% ▼	854,508	77.58%
Eastern Orthodox	12,377 ▲	0.97% ▲	9,758 ▲	0.83% ▲	8,653	0.79%
Other Christian denomination	85,770 ▼	6.74% ▼	88,576 ▲	7.54% ▼	86,901	7.89%
(Total Christian)	922,139 ▼	72.51% ▼	933,155 ▼	79.48% ▼	950,061	86.25%
Buddhism	3,865 ▲	0.3% ▼	3,660 ▲	0.31% ▼	3,610	0.33%
Irreligion	313,378 ▲	24.64% ▲	193,170 ▲	16.45% ▲	108,999	9.9%
Other	3,044 ▲	0.24% ▲	2,320 ▲	0.2%	2,252	0.2%
Hinduism	889 ▲	0.07% ▲	683 ▲	0.06% ▲	326	0.03%
Islam	3,439 ▲	0.27% ▲	2,241 ▲	0.19% ▲	1,901	0.17%
Judaism	1,163 ▲	0.09% ▲	912 ▲	0.08%	872	0.08%
Not Stated	23,779 ▼	1.87% ▼	37,906 ▲	3.23% ▲	33,488	3.04%
Total Italian Australian population	1,271,690 ▲	100%	1,174,046 ▲	100%	1,101,522	100%

=== Origins ===
Between the period of 1947 to 1971, Australia's Italy-born numbered 289,476 and most Italian migrants came from Sicily, Calabria and Veneto and settled in metropolitan areas.

=== Return migration ===
Italian Australians have a low rate of return migration to Italy. In December 2001, the Department of Foreign Affairs estimated that there were 30,000 Australian citizens resident in Italy. These are likely to be largely returned Italian emigrants with Australian citizenship, and their Italian-Australian children.

== Film on Italian immigration to Australia ==
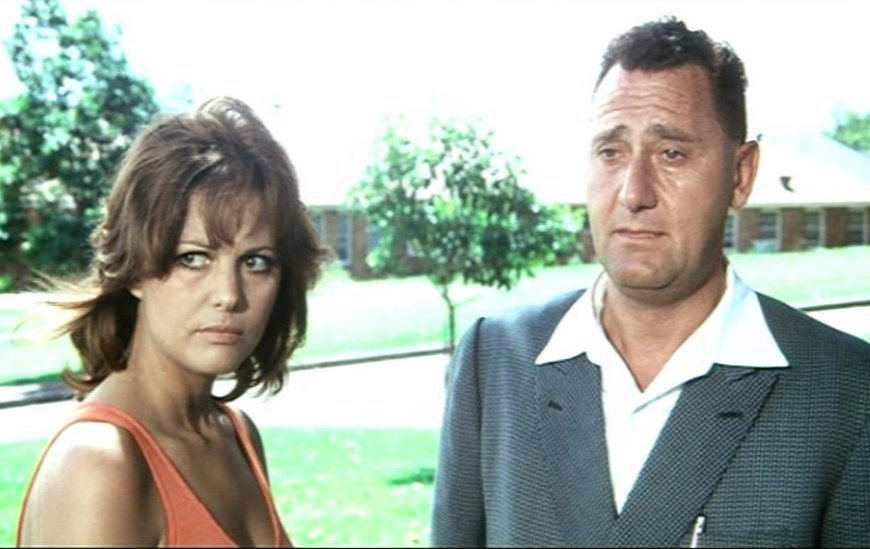
A scene from the film A Girl in Australia (1971)

- A Girl in Australia (1971), directed by Luigi Zampa
- Looking for Alibrandi (2000), directed by Kate Woods
- Love's Brother by Jan Sardi (2004)
- Underbelly (series 1) (2008)

== See also ==
- Australia–Italy relations
- European Australians
- Italian diaspora
- Italo-Australian Dialect
- List of Italian Australians
- List of Italian association football clubs in Australia
- List of Italian-Australian communities
- Swiss Italians of Australia
- Immigration to Australia
