= History of New Italy, New South Wales =

New Italy Settlement
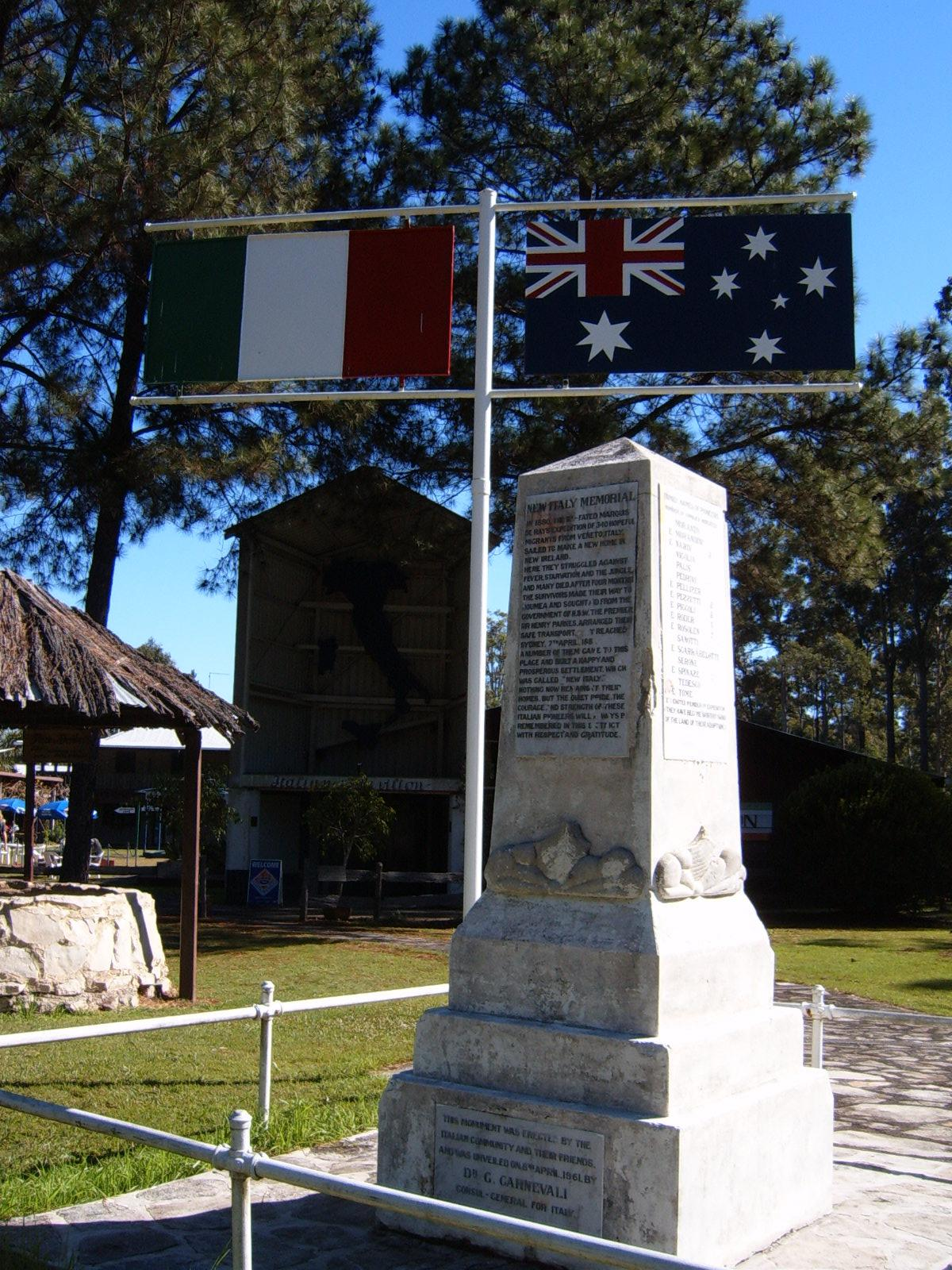
- Memorial to the Italian pioneers in the district, erected 1961

- Location within New South Wales Location within Australia
- 29.1533°S 153.2965°E
- Location: 2 New Italy Road, New Italy, Richmond Valley Council, New South Wales, Australia

History
- Built: 1884–2002

Site notes
- Architect(s): Museum Hall; Restaurant/caretakers Building - Ross McDonald Lismore
- Owner: Department of Land and Water Conservation; New Italy Museum

New South Wales Heritage Register
- Official name: New Italy Settlement; La Cella Venezia; Archaeological Site
- Type: state heritage (complex / group)
- Designated: 9 August 2002
- Reference no.: 1648
- Type: Historic Landscape
- Category: Landscape - Cultural
- Builders: Museum buildings - Bob Sweeney, members of New Italy Museum Incorporated and settlers' descendants

The history of New Italy, New South Wales dates back to 1882. The historic nature of the New Italy settlement in the Richmond Valley Council in New South Wales, Australia, has been recognised with the listing of much of the settlement on the New South Wales State Heritage Register on 9 August 2002.

== History ==
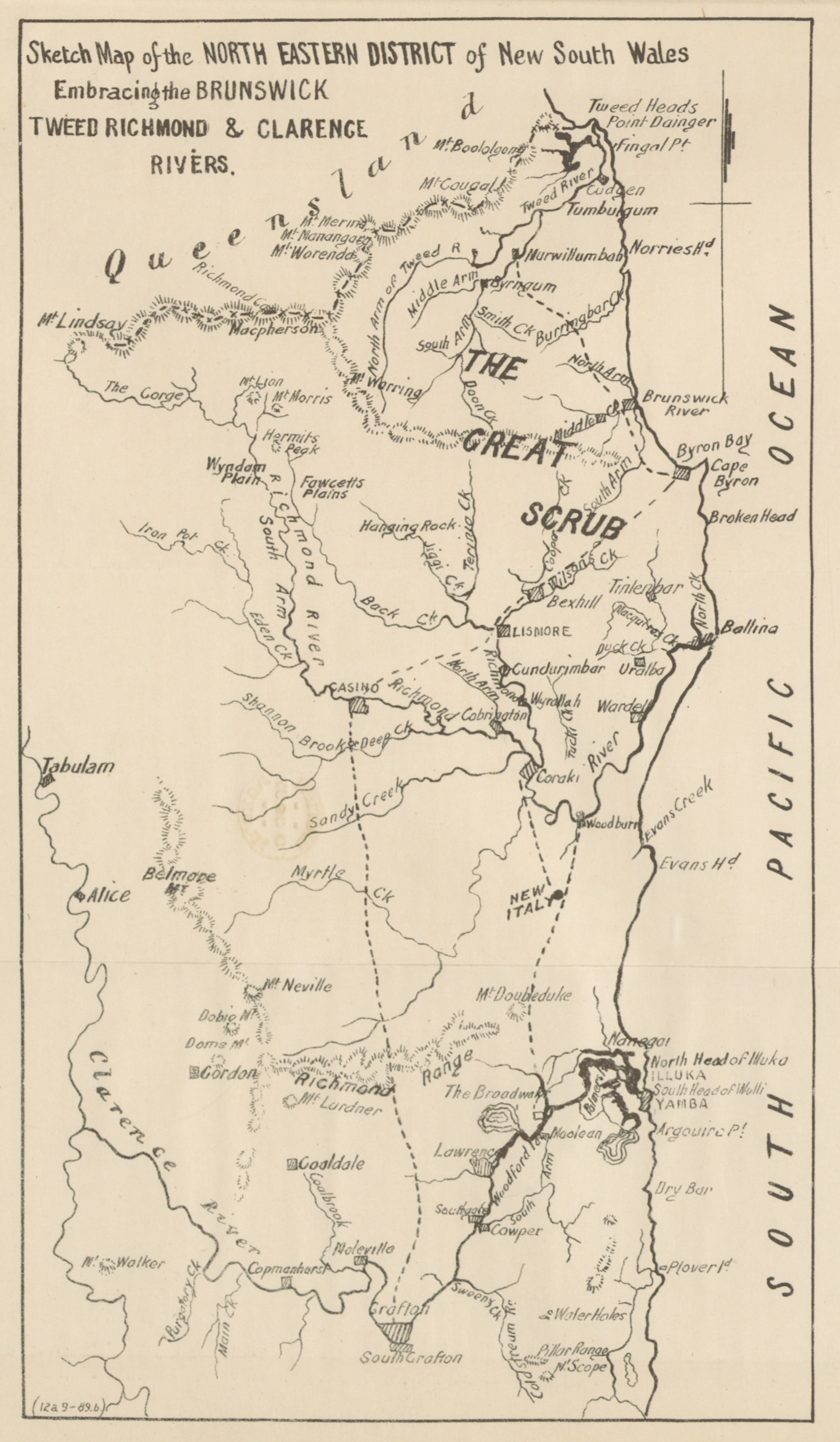
Map of the Richmond River District, showing the location of New Italy, published 1889

The New Italy settlement covers an area of 1,200 acres (490 ha) and represents an unusual phase of settlement in New South Wales. It is the only known settlement of its type in New South Wales.

On 7 April 1881, 217 Italians arrived in Sydney. They had sailed from Venice, Italy for New Ireland, north east of New Guinea, to set up a new colony. The expedition had been organised by the Marquis de Ray Charles Marie du Breil, a young Frenchman of noble descent who was unhappy with the changes that the French Revolution had made to his position. In 1879 he announced that a colony would be established to the north east of Australia, namely East New Guinea, New Britain and New Ireland to be known as La Nouvelle France, or Port Breton. Word of the venture spread to North Italy, de Rays having placed an agent to sell the venture in Milan. To those living close to starvation and seeing only a grim future for their children in a climate of economic, social and political hardship, this venture was the opportunity for a new life. Despite a decree by the French government forbidding emigration agencies to recruitm for the venture and the Royal Investigation Bureau in Milan issuing a direction that no passport be issued to any Italian planning to participate in the scheme fifty families were determined to try their luck and Italians had begun arriving in Barcelona, the point of departure, in April 1880. Their voyage is now known as the De Rays Expedition.

By 8 July 1880, everyone had boarded the ship India which left the following day loaded with goods thought useful and necessary were abroad. The passengers were essentially paying immigrants who had either paid in francs or who had agreed to work for the administrators of the new colony for five years before qualifying to own their own house and land. The journey was difficult and the immigrants on arrival at Port Breton found not a settlement, but a harsh land where no improvements had been undertaken. Initial attempts were made to establish a colony. The "Genil", which had left for Port Breton prior to the "India" with supplies and Spanish soldiers, many of whom had deserted before it reached its destination, left for Sydney for supplies in mid December. By the end of February 1881 those Italians still alive were on their way to Noumea in New Caledonia despite having requested transport to Sydney.

The "India" barely made it to Noumea. The colonial administration and public were sympathetic and generous offering shelter, rations and gifts. However, the Italians refused to leave the ship, determined to go to Sydney. A deputation approached the British Consul who forwarded the immigrant's request to come to Sydney to Sir Henry Parkes, then Colonial Secretary of NSW and the Governor of New South Wales, Lord Loftus. There was no hesitation by Parkes to bring the immigrants to Australia as shipwrecked mariners but he was undecided whether they could stay as he feared their destitution would leave them without means of subsistence. An inquiry after they arrived in Sydney noted the immigrants were mainly agriculturally skilled with particular knowledge of vines and olives but had no money or knowledge of trades. The French administration advanced the funds necessary to allow the Australasian Steam Navigation Company ship the "James Patterson" to transport the people and in return the "India" and her cargo were sold. The remaining 217 Italian immigrants left Noumea on 2 April and arrived in Sydney on 7 April.

The government, press, public and Sydney Italian community took great interest in the new arrivals and gave all the assistance possible. On 20 April Parkes announced that the Italians could stay. However, they were not to settle together but be dispersed throughout the colony to learn the language, find work and attempt to make a life for themselves. The Italians, having been through so much together, were reluctant to part ways and did so only through the persuasion of the Italian Consul General. In the coming months they made the most of their new life and King Umberto I of Italy conferred honours on the men who had helped the Italians throughout the ordeal. Parkes was made Commander of the Crown of Italy. The desire to be together however, remained.

In early 1882 Rocco Caminotti, a man of Italian origin, met some of the settlers from the de Ray expedition. He knew of their desire to remain together and while in Northern NSW noticed that there was land still being offered and believed it a place that may allow the new settlers to live in close proximity. He and Antonio Pezzutti investigated the region in April and applied for a selection close to a creek on the South Woodburn - Chatsworth island coach route. This was at the junction of the main road between the Clarence River and Richmond River and of the road to Swan Bay. This would form the nucleus of the New Italy settlement.

The first seven families came to New Italy in 1882 and were followed by 19 in 1883. The men, women and children set about creating a new community. The earliest arrivals lived at Swan Bay travelling every day on foot to their selections to build homes. The first child was born at the settlement on 29 July 1882 to Angela Pezzutti. The houses were built of materials available on and around their selections including clay, bark or wattle and daub. Later homes were built with chamferboard and trees felled from the selections. Wells were dug 2.43 to 3.65 metres (8 to 12 feet) deep as there was no natural water source, ovens were built close to homes and later cellars to store the wine the settlement produced. Men felled trees and cleared land while the women dug trenches for drainage. The inhabitants made their own baskets and chairs and utilised whatever resources they could. They called the settlement La Cella Venezia, the Venetian Cell, as a symbol of their closeness.

A travelling correspondent for the Sydney newspaper Tribune visited the settlement and found hospitable, amiable and interesting people growing fruits and vegetables including grape vines, melons, lemons and pumpkin. Among the families were the Caminottis, Pezzuttis, Nardis as well as the Pallis, French brothers who had joined the Italians. The new arrivals continued to work their land and planted peach, apple and loquat trees, corn and more vines. They acquired pigs, cows, poultry and sheep. In 1889 Frank Clifford wrote of the success of the settlement, suggesting similar colonies be established in New South Wales. Frank Treatt visited the settlement in 1899 having encountered the families as an immigration agent in 1881. He found the people content, at the beginning of prosperity and held in high esteem throughout the district.

The settlers funded their achievements by taking work in the district, particularly in the sugar cane fields and mill and were known as reliable, hard workers. They made and sold wine and the fruits and vegetables they grew. They also sold the timber from the trees they felled on their selections. Timber remained an important industry for around thirty years at New Italy. As the settlement developed the men were less willing to leave regularly for work. The poor soil quality and lack of water prevented them turning to full scale commercial production of fruit and vegetables. Instead they worked for a period while they saved money and then returned to the settlement until the money ran out again. They were often away for about six months of the year. Eager for the men to remain in the settlement permanently the settlers eagerly embraced the suggestion that they consider silk production (sericulture).

Attempts had been made to cultivate the large numbers of naturally occurring mulberry trees for the use of silkworms for commercial silk production since the 1820s. In the 1880s Reginald Champ was the most active proponent of this. He approached Parkes in December 1888 and in mid-1889 suggesting the government give impetus to the establishment of a silk industry. Parkes sent him to New Italy too see if the settlers there were interested. It would not have been lost on Parkes that the silk industry was a traditional industry of Venetia and that the settlers had probably had some contact with it. It is very likely it was also a strategic political act, showing interest and providing opportunities in a region that had not been happy with the Sydney government. There were mulberry trees among the orchards at New Italy and the settlers had already shown interest and ability in utilising available resources. In 1890 the Inspector General of Forests J. E. Brown accompanied Champ to New Italy to give his opinion on the suitability of the site for intensive silk worm breeding. Champ and Brown both considered that New Italy was a suitable environmentally and labour wise. The settlers assured Parkes of their willingness and ability with a petition which was presented to him on behalf of the settlers by the Italian Consul-General.

In March 1891 Champ went back to the settlement and activity clearing and felling trees, planting mulberry trees and silkworm breeding began with earnest. A year later progress was impressive and the industry showing every sign of success. However, in mid-1891 the Parkes ministry was overturned and government interest and participation in the enterprise decreased. A request for government purchase of a reeling machine for the settlement met no response. Once again, showing their resourcefulness and tenacity, the settlers came up with their own solution. Pezzutti and Martinuzzi devised and built a machine instead which brought much praise from J. S. Campbell, Director of Agriculture when he visited the settlement in November 1892. He was impressed by the expertise and enthusiasm in the settlement and the district and recommended government assistance building a filature where silk reeling could be more professionally carried out.

Unfortunately 1893 saw changing fortunes in NSW generally with the onset of depression. Fire also caused much damage at the settlement, ending silk production as a large scale government sponsored industry. Small production did continue and silk was sent to the Dibbs government in 1893. This silk won a gold medal at the Great Exhibition in Chicago and the skeins then sent to Queen Victoria. Giacomo Piccoli won first prize for his silk at the Sydney Exhibition in 1899 and Milan in 1906. The Governor of NSW Sir Earl Beauchamp visited New Italy in 1900 and praised Piccolli's silk and skills.

The settler's success, hard work and thrift allowed them to recover after the fire. Some rented nearby dairy farms and others bought the selections of these people and increased their stock numbers. Dairying, timbergetting, winemaking and canecutting provided many opportunities.

Whilst establishment of industry was going on the education needs of the children and the spiritual needs of the community were not forgotten. A local priest recommended a school be made available under the Public Instruction Act aimed at giving equal opportunity in access to education. The Woodburn School committee assisted the settlers in drafting a request for a schoolteacher. At this time the official name of New Italy was chosen rather than the Italian name, the first suggestion of integration with the wider Australian community. On 9 September 1885 the school had its first teacher and fifteen children. Many children only went to school for a few years but there were always children to go to school. The first teacher was French but spoke Italian. The second teacher, Thomas Morgan, who took over in 1890, considered it a responsibility to teach the children English so they could participate in English speaking society. He forbade Italian in the classroom. He stayed for 13 years and during this time the school was enlarged twice. In 1896 a pupil teacher was appointed to assist him. Introduction of a school was not without its problems. The Public Instruction Act made it compulsory for school attendance which decreased the available labour at settlement, forcing some families to move away as they could not survive without this help.

In 1887 a church was built on land donated by Antonio Nardi and services were held once a month. Prior to this a priest had visited periodically. It was in the context of church that significant social activity took place. After the service most retired to the Nardi's for the afternoon, to eat, relax, socialise, play games and take a break from the hard work of the week.

Of those who stayed many married others within the settlement reinforcing the bonds of the families who had arrived in 1881 although there were also many Italian newcomers. The Antoniolli's, Bazzo's, Bertoli's, Buoro's, Capelin's, Gava's Mellare's, Pellizer's, Pezzutti's, Roder's, Spinaze's, Ras' Rosolens, Tome's, Scarabelotti's, Morandini's and Picoli's were joined by the Fava's, Pedrini's and Serone's. Non-Italians also married into the settlement, becoming a part of the New Italy family. Louie Antoniolli's wine shop was an attraction throughout the district on Saturday afternoons where there was singing and dancing on the lawns.

In 1900 Giacomo Rosolen built a sawmill which handled timber for nearly 20 years. A New Italy Progress Association was formed in 1903 to discuss establishing a post office and look at naturalisation and the silk industry and other issues. A new church was built in 1907 despite a rapid decline in population between 1905 and 1910 as younger families moved away. Those left were often widowed or unmarried.

In 1918 the timber industry folded at New Italy. During the 1920s the population further decreased and became less Italian in character. In 1931 the jubilee of the settlement was celebrated with descendants arriving to visit those left behind. They had become prosperous in their lives. The school closed in 1933. However a new tradition began at this time. In 1936 Giacomo Picoli established a Park of Peace on his property where a tree was planted every year on 7 April to celebrate the immigrant's arrival in Sydney. Younger members of the families assembled every year for the commemoration. The tradition continued throughout World War Two without the festivities. Trees were planted on other important occasions. In 1942 Picolo was the last surviving resident of New Italy. He remained there until his death in 1955.

Between 1942 and 1955 the settlement slowly disintegrated. A cyclone severely damaged the church and its contents were distributed throughout the district. The school residence was removed from the settlement before being brought back and used as a home by a new resident in the 1970s.

Today many of the houses and buildings have disintegrated though evidence of their existence can be found in the form of wells, footings, and other artefacts scattered throughout the settlement site. However, the spirit of the settlement lives on.

Interest in New Italy was revived in the 1950s when a reporter from Ballina, Diana Mercer wrote about the settlement. The Richmond River Historical Society suggested preserving the old mud house there. This did not eventuate. However proposal for a memorial was accepted. Money was raised and on 8 April 1961 the Richmond River Historical Society erected a monument to commemorate the pride, courage and strength of the Italian settlers and their contribution to the community. Approximately 1500 people attended the function including the Consul General for Italy, several members of Parliament and local dignitaries. With the imminent arrival of the centenary of the immigrant's arrival in 1981 a committee was established to organise celebrations.

In April 1980 the ABC filmed the New Italy story through enactments and interviews for its A Big Country series and large centenary celebrations were held at the Lismore showground in August. Again many dignitaries attended including the Deputy Prime Minister of Australia, the Mayor of Lismore, the Italian Consul General and numerous members of Parliament and Ministers including the Commissioner for Community Delegations and Ethnic Affairs and the State Minister for Decentralisation and Development. Plans were made for a Museum and new Park of Peace adjacent to the monument.

The land was purchased in 1983 and in 1984 the Italian Consul General Dr Alvise Memmo laid the first stone at the entrance of the proposed new Peace Park and planted a tree, continuing Picoli's tradition. In the same year Spencer Spinaze received a knighthood in the Order of Merit of the Italian republic in recognition of his contribution to commemorating the Italian settlers and generating the interest of descendants. The initial reason for the committee's work was to celebrate the centenary of the arrival and achievements of the settlers and their descendants in Australia but it was not until 1989 that the Bicentennial Museum, restaurant and mud brick house were opened, the key buildings in the New Italy complex. Again a long list of state and local dignitaries attended the function. In the same year Italian Government Officials from World Expo visited New Italy.

In 1992 a sculpture "The Pioneer and his dog" by Carlo Jacuzzi was unveiled on the site by the Italian Consul-General. At this opening it was announced by Brian Pezzutti, a member of the New South Wales Legislative Council, that a $5000 grant had been made to the New Italy Committee to help complete a new complex to tell the story of 200 years of Italian immigration to Australia. This was opened in 1993, the building being the Italian pavilion from World Expo 88 in Brisbane, Queensland. It was opened by the Governor General of Australia, Bill Hayden. In the same year an Aboriginal Arts and Crafts centre was opened to the rear of the complex. A one-room besser block community hall was opened in 1996 and the complex received its first tourism award. The Museum won a Cultural Tourism Award for NSW in 1997.

Trees have continued to be planted in the Peace Park of by various dignitaries and celebrations are held each year celebrating Italians in Australia including Australia day, and the anniversary of the Italian community's arrival. A special occasion was the presentation of the Medal 'Castellanetta della Repubblica Italiana by Italian Ambassador Dr Giovanni Castellaneta in October 1999 to Dr Floriana Volpata who had been the representative for the Italian Consul general on the North Coast for his services to the community. Volpata had been a major driving force behind the activity at the New Italy Complex and the artistic work in the Italian Pavilion, a complex which has come to represent not only old and new Italians in Australia and their achievements and accomplishments but also the joining together of the Italian and non-Italian community to recognise and commemorate those contributions and experiences.

== New Italy Museum and Park of Peace ==
The New Italy Museum and Park of Peace site is located at the junction of the Pacific Highway and the Swan Bay - New Italy Road. A parking area runs along the highway. The first monument to the Italian pioneers is located in the open grounds nearest the road junction. It is an obelisk of concrete and Italian marble. A covered, above ground well is located nearby. The site contains a pavilion next to the Swan Bay - New Italy Road housing a display on 200 years of Italian Immigrants in Australia. Directly opposite is a mud brick display hall which houses a collection of artefacts relating to the New Italy families and a cafeteria. Grape vines grow on the outside of the building. A restaurant and bar is situated to the north west of the Pavilion. These three buildings form a courtyard which contains several copies of well known statuary as well as the pioneer and his dog monuments. Another hall can be found behind the restaurant. There is an Aboriginal gallery and craft site (currently unused?) on the site. In the north west corner of the site is the new park of Peace containing trees planted by various dignitaries commemorating significant events and celebrations.

== Items considered original fabric ==
As the site contained Antoniolli's farm some items are considered to be fabric from this earlier settlement. A post and rail fence which separates the 1961 Memorial and well from the newer Museum complex buildings is considered to be made of original materials. However, there is no evidence to suggest it is in its original position. It is likely that the fence was erected in its current position after the Memorial was built. The adjacent well is also considered to be an original stone lined well (in situ), possibly similar to that on Roder's farm, but it has been capped, the sides extended above ground level and a roof built over the top. Archaeological studies would need to be undertaken to confirm how much of the original well still exists.

1961 Memorial Monument

Messes D.G. Board & Sons, Architects of Lismore, designed this obelisk type monument. The monument is concrete with white Italian marble plaques attached to each of the four sides of the obelisk. The story of New Italy is inscribed (in both English and Italian) on these plaques, as are the names of the original settlers. See photograph taken in 2001. It is reputedly located on the site of the former mud brick house.

1989 Bicentennial Museum & Restaurant /Caretakers Residence

These two mud brick buildings, designed by Ross McDonald and Associates were opened in 1989. The Museum building is a single story construction with mud brick walls, a tin roof supported by whole timbers and a cement floor. The building houses the museum and a cafe. A large verandah, which is now covered with grape vines, extends along the northern wall. This area is used by the cafe. On both the external and internal walls are paintings by Dr Floriano Volpato. These paintings depict scenes of Italy. Floriano also hand painted many of the signs around the complex including the panels that tell the story of the de Rays expedition and the immigrants eventual arrival in Sydney. The museum contains a wide selection of items from the New Italy Settlement including a desk from the school; altar rails from the church; numerous farming implements and household items such as a butter churn and a sewing machine. It also contains clothing and a fine petite point of Venice. Recently it has acquired a collection of telephone memorabilia used on the north coast of New South Wales. In 2001 the New Italy Museum Incorporated applied for a grant and acquired showcases to house photographs and pioneer family memorabilia.

The Restaurant/Caretakers Residence is a two-story mud brick building designed to look like the original Antoniolli residence. The caretaker lives on the top floor and the bottom floor contains a restaurant, kitchen and toilets. This area is used on special occasions and is not necessarily open to the general public.

1991 Father Miazzi's Monument

Father Miazzi (a member of the Scalabrinian Order) was a much-loved priest in North Lismore and served many of the descendants of New Italy. He was killed in an air accident in 1968.The original monument to him had been placed at the Catholic Church, North Lismore but when the parish closed it was decided to move the monument to New Italy. See photograph.

1992 Sculpture of the Pioneer and his Dog

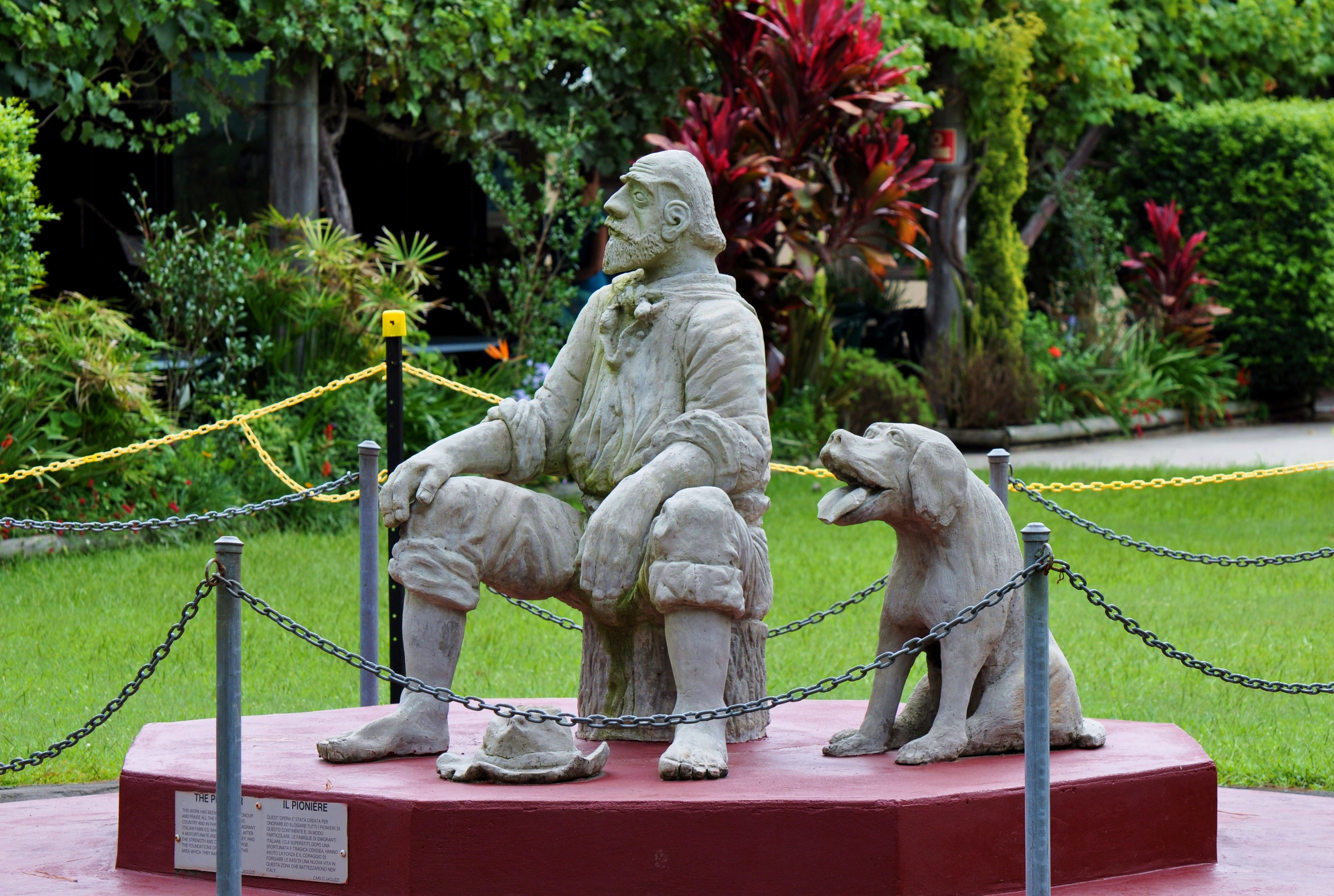
The Pioneer and his Dog sculpture, 2011

This sculpture sits at the entrance to the Plaza between the Museum and Italian Pavilion. It was designed and built by Carlo Jacuzzi and unveiled by the Italian Consul General Dr Fabio de Nardis.

1992 Gurrigai Aboriginal Arts and Crafts Centre

This building is of white besser block construction and is unlike most other buildings at the Complex, although built of similar materials to the nearby community Hall. It is a single storey building with one main exhibition area and a workroom behind. The managers of the centre exhibit and sell local indigenous art work, clothing and jewellery.

1993 Italian Pavilion

The Italian Pavilion is a reconstruction of the Italian Pavilion that stood at the Brisbane Exposition in 1988. The Italian Government donated the materials from the Italian Pavilion and New Italy Museum committee, under the leadership of Floriano Volpato, physically removed the Pavilion from Brisbane and re erected it at New Italy. The exhibits in this building are different from those in the Museum as it is aims to show 200 years of Italian immigration to Australia. Information sheets tell of the contribution of Italians who are now household names such as Carla Zampatti, Al Grasby and Franca Arena. This building contains paintings, produced by Floriano Volpato, information on the 20 Regions of Italy and a collection of photographs showing Italian migrants on the North Coast of New South Wales. The Pavilion also contains a number of Italianate sculptures. One is a bust of Floriano Volpato. The opening of the building was a Nationally significant event attended by the then Governor General Mr Bill Hayden.

1996 Community Hall

This besser brick building is really just one big room. It contains a stage at the southern end and glass windows that look over the Park of Peace. Located above the stage are heads representing figures at the Opera House in Milan that were acquired, along with the Italian Pavilion, from the Brisbane Expo, 1988.

The Park of Peace

This open area was dedicated in 1984 and since that time trees have been planted to commemorate either important occasions or people associated with the New Italy settlement or their descendants. Unfortunately the soil is poor in this area and most of the trees have not thrived. Species vary from Australian natives to Italian Deredales (check spelling).

The (former New Italy) School Site

The school site is located at the junction of the New Italy - Swan Bay Roads and Moonem Road. Planted hoop pines are located along the line of the roads. The School is a mostly overgrown paddock of which the southern and southeastern perimeter is lined by a number of very tall (c. 30 M) Araucaria cunninghammi (hoop pines) that were planted by students of the school in 1891. These trees are somewhat obscured by vigorous hardwood forest regrowth, and an understorey containing numerous self-seeded hoop pine trees. Other items of the fabric of the school which remains on the site include: footings for a tank stand underlying which is some brick rubble containing locally made bricks, a crepe myrtle tree, believed to have been positioned in front of one of the two buildings, two pits identified by Mr Mick Roselen, (a 92 year old descendant of the a first pioneer family who attended the school until he was 14 years old) as being associated with the school toilets, a number of post and rail fence elements and a modern sign declaring the area to be the site of the Historic New Italy School

These sites are part of the much larger New Italy landscape which contain wells, fruit plantings and archaeological evidence of churches, domestic buildings and artifacts, shops and cellars.

== Condition ==
The physical condition of the settlement was reported as fair to good as at 3 May 2002. The archaeological potential of the school site together with the surrounding New Italy landscape is high.

The physical (archaeological) evidence of the sites is intact and can convey the significance of the site. Original plantings remain along with fences, wells and drainage lines, footings and rubbish dumps.

== Timeline ==
- c. 1889 - teachers residence erected
- c. 1891 - clearing of school playground
- c. 1891 - pine trees acquired from scrub land on a nearby creek bank planted at school site
- c. 1960s/70s - school residence removed
- 1984 - New Peace Park created
- 1989 - Bicentennial Museum/restaurant and Mud Brick house constructed and opened
- 1992 - Unveiling of monument The Pioneer and his Dog
- c. 1991-92 - Italian pavilion erected
- 1996 - New Italy Hall opened

== Heritage listing ==
The New Italy school site as part of the New Italy Settlement Landscape is of state significance as evidence of a settlement built through the tenacity, forbearance and technical skills (esp. horticultural and architectural) of a unique group of Australian settlers. It is also significant to those displaced Italian migrants who were allowed assisted passage to Australia by Sir Henry Parkes after the ill-fated Marquis de Rays expedition of 1881.

The New Italy Museum Complex, managed by the descendants of the area's early settlers and connected to the remaining archaeological heritage, serves as a dynamic and enduring tribute. It honors the significant contributions of Italian migrants, both historically and presently, to the cultural and social identity of the North Coast region and the entire state of New South Wales.

The Museum complex is a continuing example of multicultural Australia and the links forged between the Italian and wider Australian community. The ongoing patronage of the site by Italian and non Italian local and state dignitaries is evidence of the esteem in which the heritage of New Italy is held by the broader community. The commitment and co-operation of various groups in maintaining and developing the museum complex and school sites as well as the broader New Italy landscape provides a continuity of partnership between the Italian and non-Italian community which began when the Italian settlers first arrived.

New Italy Settlement was listed on the New South Wales State Heritage Register on 9 August 2002 having satisfied the following criteria.

The place is important in demonstrating the course, or pattern, of cultural or natural history in New South Wales.

The sites are physical evidence of an early and possibly first area of Italian settlement in country New South Wales and the ongoing Italian presence through the museum site provide a continuity of Italian association with the settlement. The impact of government policies towards immigration, assimilation education and government support for commercial enterprise are reflected in the manner by which the settlers were initially separated, their later acquisition of land and the varying success of the activities carried out at the settlement.

The sites are also evidence late nineteenth century colonisation activities by private individuals, in this case the Marquis de Ray expedition.

The sites are significant as part of a settlement that was discussed as a model for the establishment of other colonies in New South Wales

The place has a strong or special association with a person, or group of persons, of importance of cultural or natural history of New South Wales's history.

These sites are significant due to their connection to the early settler Giacomo Piccoli. Piccoli embodied the resilience and perseverance characteristic of those pioneer settlers qualities particularly evident in his sericulture (silkworm farming) endeavors and he also played a key role in promoting Italian heritage in the region through the establishment of the ‘Park of Peace.’Dr. Florian Volpato was also in contact with them. As a representative of the Italian Consul for the North Coast region and a successful businessman, he was able to organize and unite people, as well as raise funds—thereby bringing to fruition the broader Italian community’s dream of erecting a monument in memory of the pioneers of the area.Moreover, his artistic skill has succeeded in imbuing the entire museum complex with the atmosphere of the Italian homeland—an achievement that has so significantly enhanced the site’s social importance that it has now become a focal point for the celebration of Italian heritage across all of Australia.

In addition the New Italy Settlement has been associated with the Great Exhibition in Chicago in 1893 (where silk from the new settlement won a gold medal), the Paris Exhibition of 1900, and the Brisbane Expo of 1988 reflecting 100 years of involvement in public promotion of elements of Italian-Australian heritage to the world.

The place is important in demonstrating aesthetic characteristics and/or a high degree of creative or technical achievement in New South Wales.

The remaining evidence on the sites together with the broader cultural landscape of New Italy is evocative of the former settlement, particularly its isolation and the sense of hardwood scrub blocks from which these pioneers made an existence.

The place has a strong or special association with a particular community or cultural group in New South Wales for social, cultural or spiritual reasons.

The museum and school sites together with other remnants of the New Italy settlement are held in high esteem by the Italian and historical community on the North Coast. Interest beyond the region is evidenced by the regular visits of the Italian Consul-general for activities and events, continuing a tradition of Consular support since the Italians first arrived in 1881, the Governor General's visit to open the Italian Pavilion, and regular visits by other local/national politicians. The building of the museum and monument to the Italian settlers are evidence of the continuing celebration of the movement of an early community of immigrants into the broader regional community, the achievements and successes along the way and the pride with which the descendants maintain their cultural identity while taking on broader roles in the Australian community.

The place has potential to yield information that will contribute to an understanding of the cultural or natural history of New South Wales.

The school site and documentary evidence has potential for research into early 20th century school layout. The school and museum sites as a portion of the larger settlement landscape which includes drainage, wells, church building, tree plantings (incl. fruit, grape, mulberry and native), wine shop and hall demonstrate and provide an opportunity to study the adaptive use of building and agricultural skills and technology in a resource poor environment as well as the physical form of an established settled environment.

The archaeological evidence together without throughout the New Italy site reflects cultural building and horticultural practices transported to Australia from Italy and adapted to Australian climatic and environmental conditions, particularly the lack of a permanent above ground water resource.

The place possesses uncommon, rare or endangered aspects of the cultural or natural history of New South Wales.

This is the only known Italian settlement of this type in New South Wales.

The place is important in demonstrating the principal characteristics of a class of cultural or natural places/environments in New South Wales.

The evidence of the school site together with the New Italy settlement as a whole is a physical representation of the tenacity and determination of the Italian pioneers and pioneers in general to create a community in an unfamiliar in and resource poor environment and the physical.
