= List of Italian-Australian communities =

In Australia there are large concentrations of Italians in many metropolitan areas of Australia. In particular, states such as New South Wales, and Victoria have larger populations of Italian-Australians than other states by national average. According to a recent study, 1 million Australians are of Italian descent. Communities of Italians were established in most major industrial cities of the early 20th century, which established concentrated communities in Sydney. During the labor shortage in the 19th and early 20th centuries, planters in Queensland did attract some Italian immigrants to work as sharecroppers, but they soon left the extreme anti-Italian discrimination and strict regimen of the plantations for towns or other states.

The state of Victoria has had Italian-Australian residents since the 1850s.

Today, Sydney and Melbourne have the largest populations of Italians in Australia.

== Victoria ==
- Keilor and surrounding areas
- Essendon and surrounding areas
- Reservoir and Preston
- Lygon St, Carlton
- Brunswick

== New South Wales ==
- Leichhardt, a suburb of Sydney
- Ramsay Street, in Haberfield, a suburb of Sydney
- Narraweena, a suburb of Sydney
- Bossley Park, New South Wales
- New Italy, New South Wales
- Griffith, a city in western New South Wales with a substantial Italian-Australian population

== South Australia ==
- Campbelltown/Athelstone & Norwood in Adelaide
- Salisbury, Virginia and Two Wells
- Thebarton, Torrensville and surrounding areas
- Seaton, Findon and Fulham Gardens

== Queensland ==
- New Farm, a suburb of Brisbane
- Paddington, Queensland, a suburb of Brisbane
- Kedron, Queensland, a suburb of Brisbane
- Ingham, Queensland

== Western Australia ==
- Stirling, Western Australia
- Harvey, Western Australia

== See also ==
- Italian Australians
