= Vineyard Haven, New Italy =

Vineyard Haven, New Italy Settlement
- Location within New South Wales Location within Australia
- 29.1516°S 153.2793°E
- Location: 1 Forest Road, New Italy, Richmond Valley Council, New South Wales, Australia

History
- Built: 1882–

Site notes
- Owner: Arnold and Mary Vayo

New South Wales Heritage Register
- Official name: Vineyard Haven, New Italy Settlement; New Italy Settlement; Archaeological Site
- Type: state heritage (landscape)
- Designated: 10 December 2004
- Reference no.: 1715
- Type: Historic Landscape
- Category: Landscape - Cultural

Vineyard Haven is a heritage-listed landscape and archaeological site at the location of a former residence and vineyard at 1 Forest Road, New Italy, Richmond Valley Council, New South Wales, Australia. It was established from 1882. It was added to the New South Wales State Heritage Register on 10 December 2004.

== History ==
'Vineyard Haven' was selected by Frenchman Phillipe Palis, who entered into a Conditional Purchase agreement (CP82/650) on 26 October 1882, and the property was surveyed on 14 March 1883. The survey plan was accepted on 11 August 1883, and the parcel of land containing 32.37 hectares was designated Parish Portion 36. Palis and his brother built a wattle & daub hut, and a blacksmith shop in which he made tools for his own use and for sale to the Italian settlers. He also planted vineyards and extensively trenched the land and dug dams and wells to irrigate the vines. Palis lived on the property with his brother for many years. There has been suggestion that Palis acted as an interpreter for settlers on several occasions. There is also suggestion that he acted as local school teacher. Believed to be highly educated, it is most likely that this was an unofficial role prior to construction of a formal local school and appointment of a teacher. Palis' friend, Frenchman Monsieur Jean Le Cheminant was appointed the first school teacher at New Italy in 1885.

The Conditional Purchase was never completed, and on the 17 August 1904 the property was transferred to an Italian settler named Giovanni Guarischi (spelt as Guariski on the plan for Parish Portion 36). Members of the family lived on the property until at least the mid 1920s. Giovanni died in 1937 and his wife Angelina in 1949, and both are buried at Woodburn Cemetery. The block was then frequently resold to local people who occasionally used it for grazing cattle, but much forest regrowth also occurred. A small number of the original old-growth trees remain in 2004.

The property was purchased in late 1971 by Arnold and Mary Vayo after they migrated to Australia with their five children Craig, Alison, Bradford, Bruce and Russell, to start a new life, reflecting the migration of the Italian settlers nearly 90 years earlier. The property was re-surveyed in 1993, and a small part (4 hectares) of the adjacent Parish Portion 67, which contained many old growth trees, was added to the "Vineyard Haven" property. In 1999 the Vayos entered into a Voluntary Conservation Agreement with the National Parks and Wildlife Service to allow as much as possible of the property to return to its forested state. The Vayo family have lived permanently on the property since 1993, and have sought listing on the State Heritage Register to enhance their ongoing protection of the surviving evidence of Italian settlement on the property.

== Description ==
This property is situated on the corner of Swan Bay-New Italy Road, and Forest Road. A creek bed traversing approximately the middle of "Vineyard Haven" in a north–south direction was the original track that the settlers used from Swan Bay to Chatswood Island, part of which was used as the track from Swan Bay to New Italy. The present Forest Road soon became the southbound road. The main route south was then quickly relocated two kilometres east of the settlement and was known as Lawrence Road for many years, and now forms part of the Pacific Highway.`

Much of the area has regrown since the Italian Settlement days and it seems possible that today's view of the landscape and setting at Vineyard Haven is much as the first settlers saw it in 1882.

The bushland is termed "dry to moist sclerophyll and swamp sclerophyll forest" and contains a broad variety of trees including (using common names) many Eucalyptus and other hardwoods such as swamp mahogany, red and pink bloodwood, spotted gum, scribbly, tallow wood, grey gum, stringy bark, iron bark, red ash, and non-eucalyptus such as rough barked apple, paper barks, forest she-oak, banksia and wattle. These trees provided the early settlers with many options and uses. There are significant rainforest elements re-emerging throughout the property.

There were about 50 adult men initially amongst the first settlers and although they undertook much of the hard physical work of clearing the land, ring barking (see photo 11) and felling trees, grubbing out roots, axing and adzing the straight timbers for building purposes, the women of the settlement also took part in the hard work of land clearing. The men also walked some 10-15 kilometres to work on the sugar plantations, often staying a whole week and returning home on weekends to continue working on their blocks. Examples of ringbarked, but unfallen trees, remain standing today, over 120 years later. Isolated original posts and well linings in timber slabs also remain as products of the tree felling.

The soil was generally heavy clay and needed hard work. However other soils such as sandstone, ironstone and gravel were also to be found on the property and used to line wells and make roads. Soon after settlement the area was subject to many wet years followed by severe dry periods. Between 1900 and 1920 the major and record drought (1915) were punctuated by significant floods. Water reticulation and retention would have been important then, and this site of the original Palis Brothers block (now 'Vineyard Haven') was then described as well trenched. They used these trenches to direct rain water to the Grave Vines, Garden, Holding Tank and the Dam in the creek bed.

Plan No. 1 indicates the location of what are probably the most significant archaeological and historic remains visible on the site today. The items are generally close by the residence of the Vayos, and are as follows:

1.and 8. Grape Vines: There are two of these on the property, north east and east of the existing Vayo residence. They are set on sloping land that still bears the marks of vineyard contours. The vines do not seem to have old stems but rather have grown from old roots. Trellises have been set up to support them. Old contours are still visible from aerial mapping on this and adjacent properties. The grapes themselves are a tough skinned small dark red grape, "Lady Isabella" in style which is a grape favoured by Italian vintners.

2. An open log trough structure, partially intact, lies close by the mud hut mound .

3. A pronounced mound of debris and earth, believed to be the site of the original hut, was described by an early visitor to the site in the 1880s as having a wattle and daub hut and blacksmiths shop. There are also 4 square chains of well trenched land planted with grape vines. The Palis Brothers were described as being articulate and intelligent. An original timber peg, used by the settlers, still lies on top of the mound (in 2004).

4. Timber lined well, called by the settlers a "holding tank", approx 2.4 metres deep, with timber linings using both tall vertical and horizontal slabs in a systematic way, and which currently has a timber platform (in need of repair in 2004) above it supporting a hand pump erected by the Vayos in 1993. This rainwater holding well/tank provided the domestic water for the early settlers, and was fed by the trenching system across the land.

5. A shallow depression, where the Vayos have a display of some vintage weather recording devices and Stevenson's Screen, was associated with the original hut site adjacent, most likely as a storage and wine making area. Excavation of soil that formed the depression may have been used as a source of material for the wattle and daub hut.

6. A bare earth circle that may be the site of the early blacksmiths shop. Metal detection has indicated metal remnants.

7. Water trenches. As noted in item 3 above, this land was described as 4 square chains of well trenched land and there are many indications of this trenching over the site.

8. Contours of old grape vines: the land slopes down away from the house. It is possible to read the landscape of this slope as the contours of the original vine rows.

9. Hand-dug dam. This dam is about 50–75 metres south east of the mud hut mound, in an intermittent creek gully, and measures about 8 metres x 5 metres, with about 3 metres in depth. It was located in 1973 by the Vayos under a covering of soft earth and leaf litter, and the bottom is lined with bricks. Some water diversion around the dam is needed, at least until an archaeological study can be made of the dam structure and function. The owner has attempted to direct water around the dam so that in the future an archaeological study may be facilitated to determine the structure and function of the dam.

=== Condition ===
The physical condition of the relics was reported to be good as at 13 July 2004. The archaeological resources are substantially intact.

== Heritage listing ==
'Vineyard Haven' occupies the property originally taken up by the French Palis Brothers, and then the Italian Giovanni Guarischi, and contributes to the state significant New Italy Settlement Landscape. The whole landscape is of state significance as evidence of a settlement built through the tenacity, forbearance and technical skills of a unique group of Australian settlers. It contains remnants of the landscape encountered by the settlers and evidence of their domestic and work practices. These relics and archaeological items include a dam site, a timber lined well, a mound, vines, vine contours on the landscape, former water trenches and other archaeological evidence. The present owners, the Vayo family, have owned the site for over 30 years and have conserved this significant evidence of 19th century settlement.

The site's context is also important. According to early portion plans an early (and possibly first) track from Chatsworth Road to Swan Bay traversed Vineyard Haven passing through portion 36 and northward through portions 35, 29 and 26 near the New Italy site, and on towards Swan Bay. It is suggested that the portion of this track between Swan Bay and New Italy, and Vineyard Haven to the south, is closely aligned to the track used by the early settlers when travelling from Swan Bay and Woodburn to Vineyard Haven to make their land selections and build their houses. It also shares or is close to the South Woodburn-Chatsworth Island coach route which had been established since the mid 1870s.

The gateway to property of Vineyard Haven is opposite the site of the Italian Settlers Saint Peter's Church which was erected in 1907 after an earlier church was destroyed by a fire. This church was demolished in 1945 after being damaged by a Storm. Another important aspect of the context is the bushland setting, much of which has regrown on Vineyard Haven and which is reminiscent of the setting and circumstances that would have faced the first Italian and French Settlers when they arrived in 1882. A very varied and mixed hardwood forest containing a "dry to moist sclerophyll and swamp sclerophyll forest" and which provides a direct link with the setting of the past and evidence of the settler's original efforts at clearing the land.

Vineyard Haven, New Italy Settlement was listed on the New South Wales State Heritage Register on 10 December 2004 having satisfied the following criteria.

The place is important in demonstrating the course, or pattern, of cultural or natural history in New South Wales.

Vineyard Haven is if state significance as one of the original New Italy properties selected in 1882, still retaining evidence of vineyards and domestic structures supporting settlement, and as a contributory element to the historic landscapes of New Italy.

The place has a strong or special association with a person, or group of persons, of importance of cultural or natural history of New South Wales's history.

Vineyard Haven is significant for its associations with the French Palis Brothers who acted as teachers and interpreters for the New Italy settlers, with the Italian Guarischi family who owned and occupied the land from the late 19th to the early 20th centuries, a then with various owners who used the site for grazing until purchased by Arnold and Mary Vayo who have conserved the site for present and future generations.

The place is important in demonstrating aesthetic characteristics and/or a high degree of creative or technical achievement in New South Wales.

Vineyard Haven is significant for the aesthetic qualities of its old growth and regrowth sclerophyll forest in a gently undulating landscape providing a setting for the homestead area and clearings used for vine cultivation along the routes that have connected New Italy to the outside world at Swan Bay; and for the technical innovation of the Italian settlers in constructing dams and watering systems for their vines that may reflect similar practises in northern Italy.

The place has potential to yield information that will contribute to an understanding of the cultural or natural history of New South Wales.

Vineyard Haven is of state significance as a reference site, in its archaeological resources, for the cultivation of vineyards by Italian settlers in the late 19th and early 20th centuries and for its potential to yield further information on the development of vine growing in NSW.

The place is important in demonstrating the principal characteristics of a class of cultural or natural places/environments in New South Wales.

Vineyard Haven may be representative in its archaeological resources and historical uses of the principal characteristics of many of the blocks settled at New Italy, although further research on other sites in New Italy is needed to confirm this.
