= Australia–Italy relations =

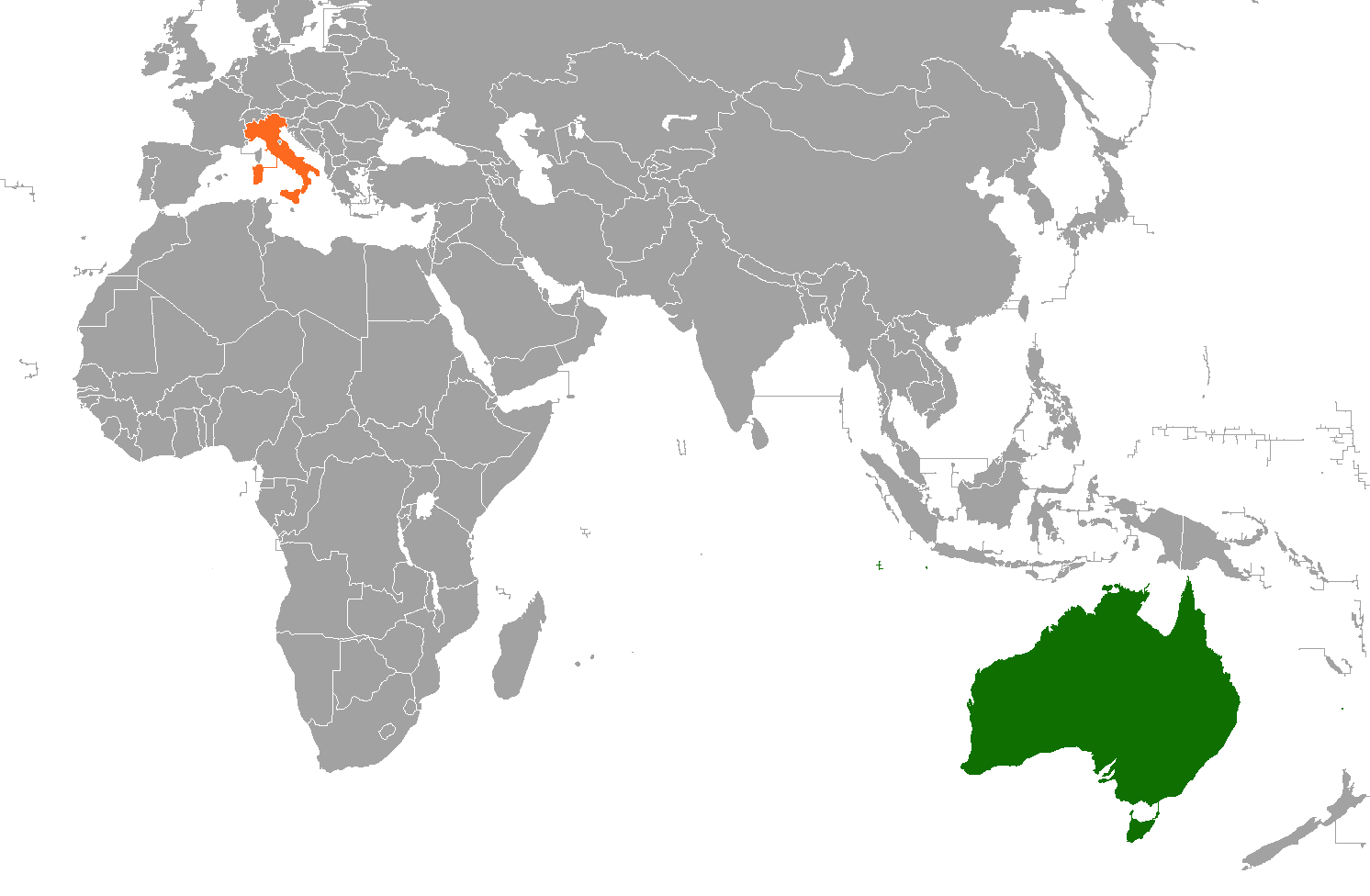

- Australia: Italy

Australia and Italy established formal diplomatic relations in 1949. Francesca Tardioli was appointed Italian ambassador to Australia in September 2019, the first woman to represent Italy in Australia until her death in February 2022. The headquarters of the Italian embassy, designed by the Italian-Australian architect Enrico Taglietti, is located in the Canberra district of Deakin. Margaret Twomey was appointed Australian ambassador in Rome in July 2020.

== History ==
Edmund Barton became the first Australian prime minister to visit Italy in 1902, a year after the federation of the Australian colonies. He transited through Italy on his way to attend the coronation of Edward VII and Alexandra in London, and did not conduct official business although he had an audience with Pope Leo XIII at the Vatican.

As a result of the Abyssinia Crisis and the Italian invasion of Abyssinia in 1935, the Australian government enacted the Sanctions Act 1935, which barred Australians from doing business with Italy unless authorised by the government. Australian prime minister Joseph Lyons met Italian leader Benito Mussolini in Rome on two occasions – in 1935 and 1937. The second meeting occurred prior to the 1937 Imperial Conference, where Lyons put forward a proposal for a rapprochement between Italy and the British Empire. Australia ultimately recognised Italy's annexation of Abyssinia in 1938.

Australia and Italy were at war during World War II. During the war Italian citizens in Australia were sent to internment camps as enemy aliens.

In February 1949, following the end of the war, Italy appointed Guilio del Balzo di Presenzano as its first minister in Australia, reportedly the "first ex-enemy diplomat" in Australia. In September 1949, external affairs minister H. V. Evatt announced that Australia would open a legation in Rome with Cedric Kellway as Australia's first minister to Italy. In January 1958, diplomatic representation between the countries was raised to embassy status.

In 2001, Australia's Monash University opened its Prato Centre in Italy, the first time an Australian university expanded into Europe.

An academic book, edited by Gabriele Abbondanza and Simone Battiston and published by Palgrave Macmillan in 2023, outlined the state of bilateral relations in a variety of fields, from migration and culture to economics and international relations, while also recommending several ways to strengthen them.

== Diplomatic relations ==
The presence of a quite large Italian community has over time helped the two countries to develop shared interests. Both countries collaborate in various fields, from the political and economic area to the cultural and scientific one. Of importance, is also the collaboration in the fight against terrorism and within the G20. There are also recent sectors where Rome and Canberra are active, such as renewable energies, manufacturing, international education and space with the important SKA (Square Kilometre Array) project. Further impulse was given by the signing of the recent Agreement on Scientific, Technological and Innovation Cooperation between the Government of Australia and the Government of the Italian Republic in 2018. In recent times, Australia has been opening up even more to economic integration and free trade agreements with several countries, including Italy and the European Union in general. Moreover, both states are present in international fora as Weog (The Group of Western European and Other States), UN (United Nations), WHO (World Health Organization) as well as many other international conferences.

The promotion of Italian culture is regulated by the bilateral agreement signed in Rome on 8 January 1975 and the following executive programmes. The Italian embassy and Italian community in Australia, which aim to spread both the idiom and the culture itself, support projects related to literature, music, arts, and the "Made in Italy" brand. In Italy, the Australian embassy promotes activities and events in several fields and fashion competitions like “Wool Wonders” to promote its wool industry.

Missions and visits of exponents are not that frequent also because of the geographical distance. In 2017 the Foreign Minister of Italy, Angelino Alfano, visited Australia to meet with the then Foreign Minister, Julie Bishop. The last high-profile meeting dates back to 2018, a year in which Italy welcomed Peter Cosgrove, the then Australian Governor General. Australia has an embassy in Rome and a general consulate in Milan. Italy has an embassy in Canberra, 2 general consulates (in Melbourne and Sydney) and 3 consulates (in Adelaide, Brisbane and Perth).

== Migratory flows ==
=== Italians in Australia ===
The history of Italian emigration to Australia began with the arrival on this continent by James Cook in 1770. On board the English ship there were two sailors of Italian origin and an Italian prisoner who then settled in Sydney.

The first Italian community in Australia was formed only at the end of the nineteenth century in Queensland, where labor was required for the processing of sugar cane. Migration increased considerably when the gold rush broke out in Western Australia. In that time the Italian community began to exceed the thousand of units thanks also to a bilateral treaty between the United Kingdom and Italy that gave Italians freedom of travel, residence and business.

In the early 1900s, over 20,000 Italians (mostly composed by men from the southern or north-eastern regions of the country, fleeing from a precarious condition and economic difficulties) left for Australia in search of fortune.

With the end of the Second World War, the real boom of Italian emigrants to Australia materialized. The dramatic economic situation in Italy at the end of the war pushed over 200,000 Italians to move to Australia between 1949 and 1959. After a lockout period during the conflict, Australia again opened its doors to the Italians, thanks also to good diplomatic relations with Italy.

The great need of manpower and the abundance of opportunities attracted many Italian people in search of a better life and until the 1970s immigration traveled at a very rapid pace.

To encourage meeting and the maintenance of Italian identity, the Italians organized themselves into Clubs and Associations that helped to maintain ties between them and to preserve traditions (the study of the Italian language is still promoted in Australian schools).

After a decline in the migratory flow, today history seems to repeat itself and the number of Italians seeking fortune in Australia is once again on the rise. In the 2012-2013 period, Italy was the sixth country in the world for the number of work visas issued by Australian immigration, with more than 60% increase over the previous two years. According to the AIRE census in 2019 there were just under 150 thousand Italians residing in Australia (in particular, the largest communities Italian in Australia are those of the big cities: Melbourne, Sydney, Adelaide and Perth).

=== Australians in Italy ===
Within 1960–1975, of 90,000 Italian migrants, 22% of Italian Australians returned to Italy for permanent residence. This on average was after over a decade of living in Australia, and constituted both Italian born, and Australian born individuals with Italian heritage. Associazione Nazionale Emigrati ed Ex emigrati in Australia (ANEA) is an organization which began in 1976 in Italy, in an attempt to reintegrate Italian Australians back into Italy, whilst maintaining a connection with Australia. The organisation was later known to the Ministry of Foreign Affairs facilitates conferences each year placing emphasis on social and cultural reintegration.

From 1991 until 2003, 32,863 Australians departed for Italy from Australia (there are various categories of Australians departures including returning Italian migrants, individuals with Italian heritage, dual-citizens, and expatriates).

In these years there were over 30,000 Australians in Italy, including dual citizens (Italian Australians). Approximately two-thirds of these are settled in Rome while the rest are mainly in Milan.

Australia has various other agreements with Italy including a working holiday visa. This has allowed Australian tourism to count for 1.3% of total tourism within Italy (especially for studying and observe the historical sites).

Australia has two embassies in Italy, one in Rome and the other in Milan. These bodies manage public diplomacy and collaborate with Australian companies (for example 'Screen Australia' which produce films within the Italian landscape).

== Economic relations ==
Italy and Australia are two highly developed G20 economies characterized by a historical relations and currently have good business relations.

In 2019, two-way goods and services trade between Australia and Italy was valued at $11.1 billion. Australian merchandise exports to Italy totalled $692 million. Australia's principal exports were: wool & other animal hair, coal, leather, and beef. Goods exported from Italy to Australia were valued at $7.1 billion. Major imports from Italy were: medicaments (including veterinary); travel goods, bags & like containers; passenger motor vehicles; and heating & cooling equipment & parts. In 2019, the export of Australian services to Italy was valued at $607 million, while services imported from Italy totalled $2.7 billion. The services trade was dominated by personal travel. Australia's stock of investment in Italy in 2019 totalled $8.0 billion. Investment in Australia from Italy was $1.3 billion. Australian investment in Italy is focused on areas such as urban redevelopment and energy.

The COVID-19 pandemic caused a significant contraction in trade between Italy and Australia during 2020. The trade balance remains favorable to Italy (3.3 billion euros). According to data relating to 2020, Italy maintains the eleventh place in the ranking of the main supplier countries of Australia (after China, USA, Japan, Thailand, Germany, Malaysia, South Korea, Singapore, New Zealand and the United Kingdom), confirming itself in second place among the countries of the European Union, after Germany.

Facilities: both countries have facilities and offices located in the territory of the host nation to be of support to entrepreneurs who want to develop business. In particular, Italy provides Italian companies wishing to develop their business in Australia with a series of diplomatic offices such as the Embassy located in the capital Canberra and the consular offices in Sydney, Melbourne, Perth, Adelaide and Brisbane. In Australia there are also ICE offices (Agenzia per la promozione all’estero e l’internazionalizzazione delle imprese italiane) and ENIT offices (Ente Nazionale Italiano per il Turismo), in addition to four Chambers of Commerce spread throughout the territory (Sydney, Melbourne, Perth, Brisbane).

Australia has the Austrade Office in Italy (Milan) which is primarily focused on attracting productive foreign direct investment into Australia.

== See also ==
- Foreign relations of Australia
- Foreign relations of Italy
- Italian Australian
