= Leopoldo Zunini =

Italian diplomat

Leopoldo Zunini (20 December 1868, Savona – June 1944, Sassello) was an Italian diplomat.

Zunini joined the consular service in 1896. As early as 1898, Zunini was already serving as the Vice-Consul in Tunis. He was appointed to Marseille, Bern, Tunis, Montevideo and Lima, before becoming Vice-Consul of Western Australia in 1902. In 1906 he wrote L'Australia attuale (published in 1910), translated in English in 1999 as Western Australia As It Is Today (ISBN 1875560971). Later he was the Italian Consul General of Chicago from 18 May 1922 until 1 June 1928 when he was promoted to the rank of Minister plenipotentiary by Benito Mussolini.
