= New Italy, New South Wales =

New Italy
- Town
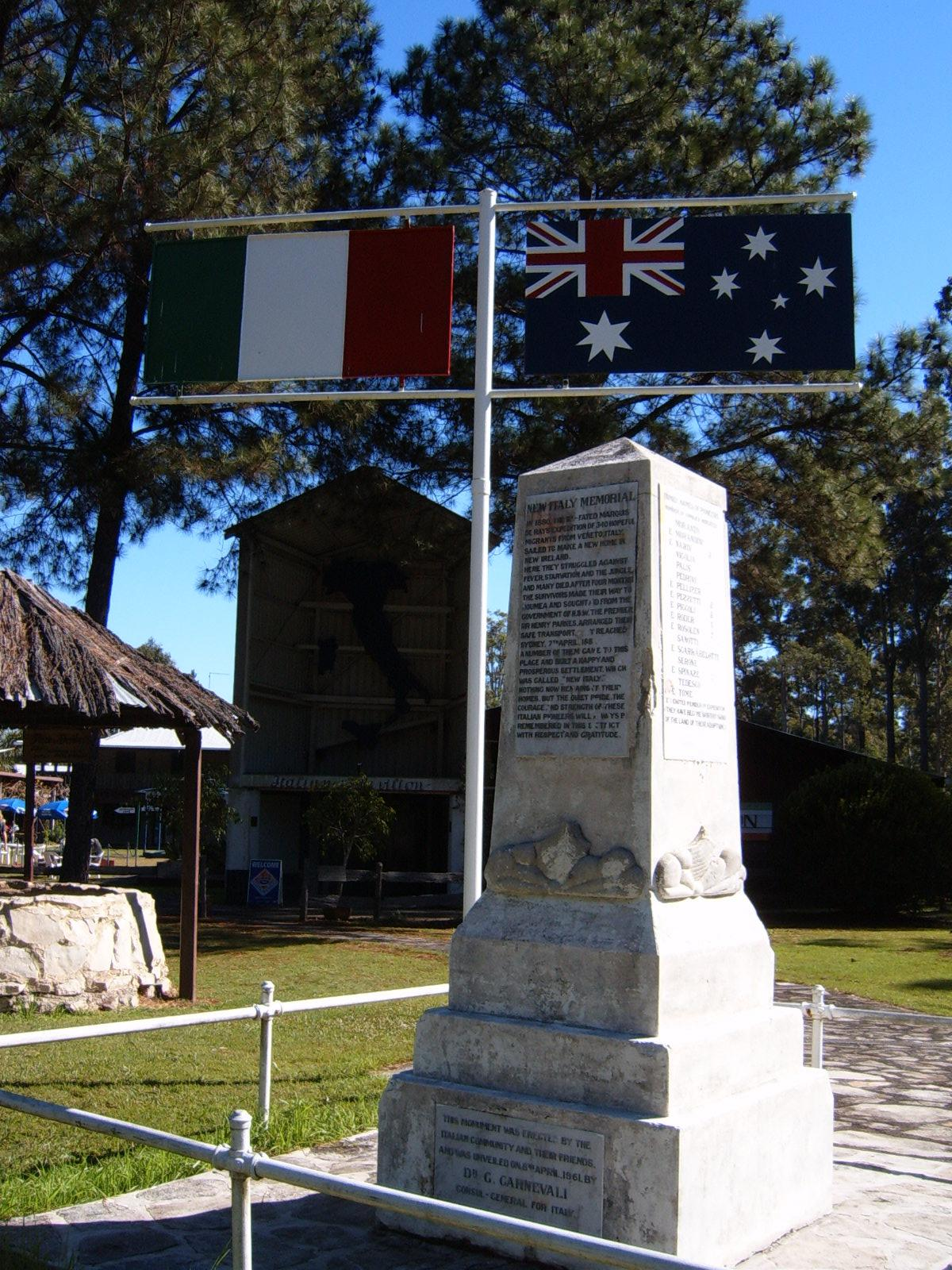

- Coordinates: 29°09′11″S 153°17′57″E
- Country: Australia
- State: New South Wales
- LGA: Richmond Valley Council
- Location: 693 km (431 mi) NE of Sydney; 12 km (7.5 mi) S of Woodburn
- Established: 1882

Government
  - State electorate: Clarence
  - Federal division: Page

Population
  - Total: 249 (2021 census)
- Postcode: 2472

New Italy (Italian: Nuova Italia) is a village near Woodburn in the Northern Rivers district in New South Wales, Australia. The busy Pacific Highway passes nearby. New Italy is 693 km north-east of the state capital, Sydney, and 12 km south of Woodburn.

New Italy is part of the Richmond Valley Shire, the administrative headquarters of which is in nearby Casino.

== History ==
In 1882 Venetian immigrants, most of them survivors of the ill-fated De Rays Expedition, took up a conditional purchase farm of 40 acres (160,000 m^{2}) near Woodburn at what was initially called Cèa Venessia (Little Venice) and later renamed New Italy. By the mid-1880s, about 50 holdings of an aggregate area of more than 3,000 acres (12 km^{2}) were under occupation, and the Italian population of New Italy had increased to 250. It was a small farming community growing fruits and vegetables including grape vines. The school was opened in 1885 but ceased operation in 1933 due to decreasing enrolments. The New Italy settlers built mud brick houses, a church, school and community hall in traditional style of northern Italy. Due to its remote location the population of settlements was stagnant. In the 1930s a Park of Peace was established to remember the pioneers of the settlement. In the late 1950s the regional significance of the settlement began to be recognised. The Bicentennial Museum was opened in 1989. Following the World Expo in Brisbane in 1988 the Italian government presented the contents of their Expo Pavilion to the New Italy Centenary Committee and the Italian Pavilion at New Italy was opened in May 1993. The Museum presents the history of Italian migration to Australia and the memorabilia from the New Italy settlement. The Pavilion celebrates all Italian migrants and their contribution to the culture of Australia.

== Heritage listings ==
New Italy via Woodburn has a number of heritage-listed sites, including:

- 1 Forest Road: Vineyard Haven
- 2 New Italy Road: New Italy Settlement

== See also ==
- Historical overview of Italians in Australia
