= Marquis de Rays =

French colonist (1832–1893)

Charles Marie Bonaventure du Breil, Marquis de Rays (2 January 1832 – 29 July 1893) was a French nobleman who had ambitions of starting a great French colony in the South Pacific. He led four European expeditions to establish colonies in a place he called New France which is the island now referred to as New Ireland in the Bismarck Archipelago of present-day Papua New Guinea.

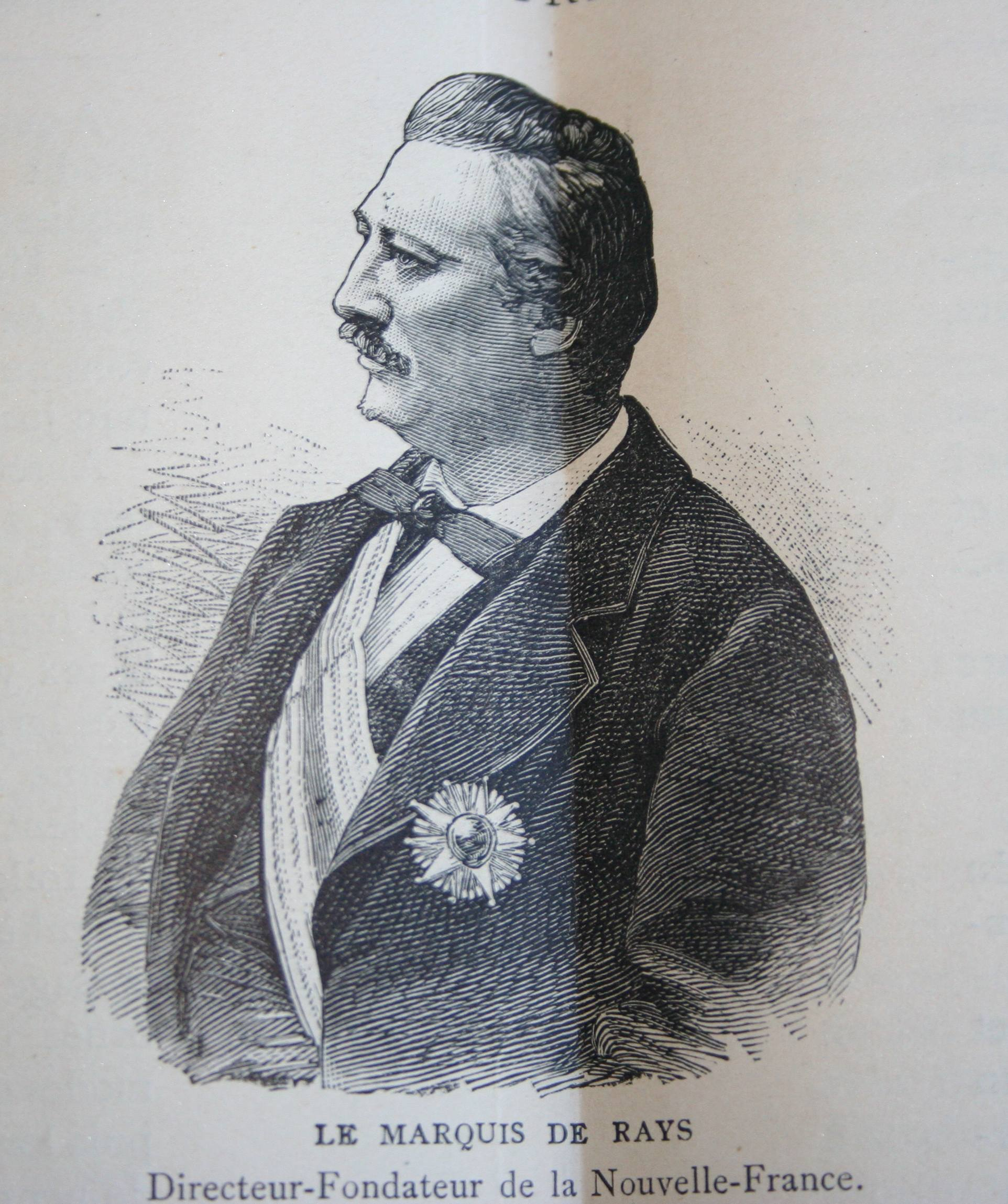
Marquis De Rays 1883

== Early life ==
Charles was born on the family estate Quimerc'h in Brittany, the son of Charles du Breil and Mari Prevost. As a child in 1838 he succeeded his father as marquis and spent his youth in fortune-seeking but ineffective adventures abroad: in the United States, Senegal, Madagascar, and Indo-China. He eventually returned to France.

== Career ==
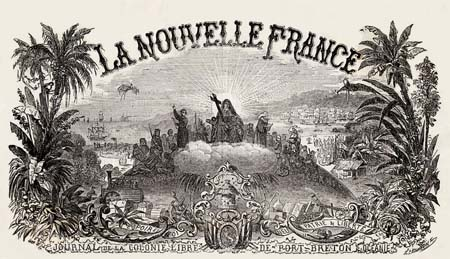
Example of the marquis's self-promotion

It was the defeat of France in the Franco-Prussian War and the readings he made of some navigators' journals that prompted de Rays to embark on further adventures for the glorification of France and the Catholic Church. The theatre for his ambitions was to be the South Pacific, where in 1877 he was self-proclaimed "Charles, King of New France" (La Nouvelle France), an imaginary Oceanic empire covering territories as yet unclaimed by any European powers. Through advertisements, word of mouth, and a journal of his own publishing, Nouvelle France, de Rays brought to public attention his plans for converting and then colonising the South Pacific, which he claimed abounded in fertile soil. Specifically, de Rays planned to start a colony, "Colonie Libre de Port Breton", at Port Praslin. His ideas were universally rejected by governments, but enough people believed his wild predictions to support an expedition.

The third of his expeditions, often referred to simply as the de Rays Expedition, in 1880 is most famous for its absolute failure. Aboard the ships Chandernagore, Gentil, Nouvelle Bretagne, and India, a motley group of 570 ill-prepared colonists, in the main French, German, and Italian, arrived at Port Breton. The marquis is widely believed to have deliberately misled the colonists, distributing literature claiming a bustling settlement that did not exist, near present-day Kavieng, which had numerous public buildings, wide roads, and rich, arable land. This port was further purported to be capital of a great empire, his "Kingdom of New France". In fact, the site was an extremely poor choice: supplies were difficult to get through and malaria was unavoidable. The high death rate convinced most colonists to soon flee to Australia, New Caledonia, and the Philippines.

De Rays himself did not visit his colony and was arrested for fraud in Spain in July 1882. He was extradited to France and sentenced to six years in prison for criminal negligence, but his career as an adventurer was not over.

== Personal life ==
On 22 September 1869, he married Emilie Labat, who gave him five children, including two known sons: Eugène Paul Emile and Charles (arrived in Chile in 1898).

The Marquis died on 29 July 1893 in a French asylum near Rosporden after accruing several more failures to his name.

== See also ==
- French Indochina
- New Caledonia
- French Polynesia

== Bibliography ==
- Laracy, Hugh. "Rays, Marquis de (1832–1893)." Australian Dictionary of Biography, Online Edition. Australian National University: 2006, ISSN 1833-7538

Daniel Raphalen "L'Odyssée de Port-Breton ou le rêve océanien du marquis de Rays" éditions les Portes du Large France 2006
