= List of birds of Ashmore Reef =

This is a list of the bird species recorded in Ashmore Reef. The territory comprises Ashmore Reef, which includes West, Middle, and East islands, two lagoons, and Cartier Reef, which includes Cartier Island. The avifauna of Ashmore Reef include a 174 species, of which 1 has been introduced by humans.

This list's taxonomic treatment (designation and sequence of orders, families and species) and nomenclature (common and scientific names) follow the conventions of The Clements Checklist of Birds of the World, 2022 edition. The family accounts at the beginning of each heading reflect this taxonomy, as do the species counts in each family account. Introduced and accidental species are included in the total counts for Ashmore Reef.

The following tags have been used to highlight several categories. The commonly occurring native species do not fall into any of these categories.

- (A) Accidental - a species that rarely or accidentally occurs in Ashmore Reef
- (I) Introduced - a species introduced to Ashmore Reef as a consequence, direct or indirect, of human actions

== Magpie goose ==
Order: Anseriformes Family: Anseranatidae

The family contains a single species, the magpie goose. It was an early and distinctive offshoot of the anseriform family tree, diverging after the screamers and before all other ducks, geese and swans, sometime in the late Cretaceous.

- Magpie goose, Anseranas semipalmata

== Ducks, geese, and waterfowl ==
Order: Anseriformes Family: Anatidae

The family Anatidae includes the ducks and most duck-like waterfowl, such as geese and swans. These are adapted for an aquatic existence, with webbed feet, bills that are flattened to a greater or lesser extent, and feathers that are excellent at shedding water due to special oils.

- Hardhead, Aythya australis (A)

== Pigeons and doves ==
Order: Columbiformes Family: Columbidae

Pigeons and doves are stout-bodied birds with short necks and short slender bills with a fleshy cere.

- Peaceful dove, Geopelia placida
- Nicobar pigeon, Caloenas nicobarica (A)
- Rose-crowned fruit-dove, Ptilinopus regina

== Cuckoos ==
Order: Cuculiformes Family: Cuculidae

The family Cuculidae includes cuckoos, roadrunners and anis. These birds are of variable size with slender bodies, long tails and strong legs. The Old World cuckoos are brood parasites.

- Lesser coucal, Centropus bengalensis (A)
- Pacific koel, Eudynamys orientalis
- Channel-billed cuckoo, Scythrops novaehollandiae
- Horsfield's bronze-cuckoo, Chrysococcyx basalis
- Black-eared cuckoo, Chrysococcyx osculans
- Shining bronze-cuckoo, Chrysococcyx lucidus
- Little bronze-cuckoo, Chrysococcyx minutillus (A)
- Pallid cuckoo, Cacomantis pallidus
- Brush cuckoo, Cacomantis variolosus
- Oriental cuckoo, Cuculus optatus

== Nightjars and allies ==
Order: Caprimulgiformes Family: Caprimulgidae

Nightjars are medium-sized nocturnal birds that usually nest on the ground. They have long wings, short legs and very short bills. Most have small feet, of little use for walking, and long pointed wings. Their soft plumage is camouflaged to resemble bark or leaves.

- Large-tailed nightjar, Caprimulgus macrurus

== Swifts ==
Order: Caprimulgiformes Family: Apodidae

Swifts are small birds which spend the majority of their lives flying. These birds have very short legs and never settle voluntarily on the ground, perching instead only on vertical surfaces. Many swifts have long swept-back wings which resemble a crescent or boomerang.

- White-throated needletail, Hirundapus caudacutus
- White-nest swiftlet, Aerodramus fuciphagus (A)
- Pacific swift, Apus pacificus
- House swift, Apus affinis (A)

== Rails, gallinules, and coots ==
Order: Gruiformes Family: Rallidae

Rallidae is a large family of small to medium-sized birds which includes the rails, crakes, coots and gallinules. Typically they inhabit dense vegetation in damp environments near lakes, swamps or rivers. In general they are shy and secretive birds, making them difficult to observe. Most species have strong legs and long toes which are well adapted to soft uneven surfaces. They tend to have short, rounded wings and to be weak fliers.

- Buff-banded rail, Gallirallus philippensis
- Watercock, Gallicrex cinerea (A)
- White-breasted waterhen, Amaurornis phoenicurus (A)
- Red-legged crake, Rallina fasciata (A)

== Thick-knees ==
Order: Charadriiformes Family: Burhinidae

The thick-knees are a group of largely tropical waders in the family Burhinidae. They are found worldwide within the tropical zone, with some species also breeding in temperate Europe and Australia. They are medium to large waders with strong black or yellow-black bills, large yellow eyes and cryptic plumage. Despite being classed as waders, most species have a preference for arid or semi-arid habitats.

- Beach thick-knee, Esacus magnirostris

== Stilts and avocets ==
Order: Charadriiformes Family: Recurvirostridae

Recurvirostridae is a family of large wading birds, which includes the avocets and stilts. The avocets have long legs and long up-curved bills. The stilts have extremely long legs and long, thin straight bills.

- Pied stilt, Himantopus leucocephalus

== Plovers and lapwings ==
Order: Charadriiformes Family: Charadriidae

The family Charadriidae includes the plovers, dotterels and lapwings. They are small to medium-sized birds with compact bodies, short, thick necks and long, usually pointed, wings. They are found in open country worldwide, mostly in habitats near water.

- Black-bellied plover, Pluvialis squatarola
- Pacific golden-plover, Pluvialis fulva
- Masked lapwing, Vanellus miles
- Lesser sand-plover, Charadrius mongolus
- Greater sand-plover, Charadrius leschenaultii
- Red-capped plover, Charadrius ruficapillus (A)
- Oriental plover, Charadrius veredus

== Sandpipers and allies ==
Order: Charadriiformes Family: Scolopacidae

Scolopacidae is a large diverse family of small to medium-sized shorebirds including the sandpipers, curlews, godwits, shanks, tattlers, woodcocks, snipes, dowitchers, and phalaropes. The majority of these species eat small invertebrates picked out of the mud or soil. Variation in length of legs and bills enables multiple species to feed in the same habitat, particularly on the coast, without direct competition for food.

- Whimbrel, Numenius phaeopus
- Little curlew, Numenius minutus
- Far Eastern curlew, Numenius madagascariensis
- Bar-tailed godwit, Limosa lapponica
- Black-tailed godwit, Limosa limosa
- Ruddy turnstone, Arenaria interpres
- Great knot, Calidris tenuirostris
- Red knot, Calidris canutus
- Broad-billed sandpiper, Calidris falcinellus
- Sharp-tailed sandpiper, Calidris acuminata
- Curlew sandpiper, Calidris ferruginea
- Long-toed stint, Calidris subminuta
- Red-necked stint, Calidris ruficollis
- Sanderling, Calidris alba
- Dunlin, Calidris alpina (A)
- Little stint, Calidris minuta (A)
- Asian dowitcher, Limnodromus semipalmatus
- Swinhoe's snipe, Gallinago megala (A)
- Terek sandpiper, Xenus cinereus
- Red-necked phalarope, Phalaropus lobatus (A)
- Common sandpiper, Actitis hypoleucos
- Gray-tailed tattler, Tringa brevipes
- Common greenshank, Tringa nebularia
- Marsh sandpiper, Tringa stagnatilis
- Wood sandpiper, Tringa glareola
- Common redshank, Tringa totanus (A)

== Buttonquail ==
Order: Charadriiformes Family: Turnicidae

The buttonquail are small, drab, running birds which resemble the true quails. The female is the brighter of the sexes and initiates courtship. The male incubates the eggs and tends the young.

- Red-backed buttonquail, Turnix maculosa (A)

== Pratincoles and coursers ==
Order: Charadriiformes Family: Glareolidae

Glareolidae is a family of wading birds comprising the pratincoles, which have short legs, long pointed wings, and long forked tails, and the coursers, which have long legs, short wings, and long, pointed bills which curve downwards.

- Australian pratincole, Stiltia isabella
- Oriental pratincole, Glareola maldivarum

== Skuas and jaegers ==
Order: Charadriiformes Family: Stercorariidae

The family Stercorariidae are, in general, medium to large birds, typically with grey or brown plumage, often with white markings on the wings. They nest on the ground in temperate and arctic regions and are long-distance migrants.

- Pomarine jaeger, Stercorarius pomarinus (A)
- Parasitic jaeger, Stercorarius parasiticus (A)
- Long-tailed jaeger, Stercorarius longicaudus (A)

== Gulls, terns, and skimmers ==
Order: Charadriiformes Family: Laridae

Laridae is a family of medium to large seabirds, the gulls, terns, and skimmers. Gulls are typically grey or white, often with black markings on the head or wings. They have stout, longish bills and webbed feet. Terns are a group of generally medium to large seabirds typically with grey or white plumage, often with black markings on the head. Most terns hunt fish by diving but some pick insects off the surface of fresh water. Terns are generally long-lived birds, with several species known to live in excess of 30 years. Skimmers are a small family of tropical tern-like birds. They have an elongated lower mandible which they use to feed by flying low over the water surface and skimming the water for small fish.

- Brown noddy, Anous stolidus
- Black noddy, Anous minutus
- Lesser noddy, Anous tenuirostris
- White tern, Gygis alba
- Sooty tern, Onychoprion fuscatus
- Bridled tern, Onychoprion anaethetus
- Little tern, Sternula albifrons
- Gull-billed tern, Gelochelidon nilotica
- White-winged tern, Chlidonias leucopterus
- Whiskered tern, Chlidonias hybrida (A)
- Roseate tern, Sterna dougallii
- Common tern, Sternula hirundo
- Arctic tern, Sternula paradisaea (A)
- Great crested tern, Thalasseus bergii
- Lesser crested tern, Thalasseus bengalensis

== Tropicbirds ==
Order: Phaethontiformes Family: Phaethontidae

Tropicbirds are slender white birds of tropical oceans, with exceptionally long central tail feathers. Their long wings have black markings, as does the head.

- White-tailed tropicbird, Phaethon lepturus
- Red-billed tropicbird, Phaethon aethereus (A)
- Red-tailed tropicbird, Phaethon rubricauda

== Southern storm-petrels ==
Order: Procellariiformes Family: Oceanitidae

The southern storm-petrels are the smallest seabirds, relatives of the petrels, feeding on planktonic crustaceans and small fish picked from the surface, typically while hovering. Their flight is fluttering and sometimes bat-like.

- Wilson's storm-petrel, Oceanites oceanicus

== Northern storm-petrels ==
Order: Procellariiformes Family: Hydrobatidae

Though the members of this family are similar in many respects to the southern storm-petrels, including their general appearance and habits, there are enough genetic differences to warrant their placement in a separate family.

- Leach's storm-petrel, Hydrobates leucorhous (A)
- Swinhoe's storm-petrel, Hydrobates monorhis (A)
- Matsudaira's storm-petrel, Hydrobates matsudairae

== Shearwaters and petrels ==
Order: Procellariiformes Family: Procellariidae

The procellariids are the main group of medium-sized "true petrels", characterised by united nostrils with medium nasal septum, and a long outer functional primary flight feather.

- Trindade petrel, Pterodroma arminjoniana (A)
- Bulwer's petrel, Bulweria bulwerii (A)
- Jouanin's petrel, Bulweria fallax (A)
- Tahiti petrel, Pseudobulweria rostrata
- Streaked shearwater, Calonectris leucomelas
- Wedge-tailed shearwater, Ardenna pacifica
- Hutton's shearwater, Puffinus huttoni

== Frigatebirds ==
Order: Suliformes Family: Fregatidae

Frigatebirds are large seabirds usually found over tropical oceans. They are large, black, or black-and-white, with long wings and deeply forked tails. The males have coloured inflatable throat pouches. They do not swim or walk and cannot take off from a flat surface. Having the largest wingspan-to-body-weight ratio of any bird, they are essentially aerial, able to stay aloft for more than a week.

- Lesser frigatebird, Fregata ariel
- Great frigatebird, Fregata minor

== Boobies and gannets ==
Order: Suliformes Family: Sulidae

The sulids comprise the gannets and boobies. Both groups are medium-large coastal seabirds that plunge-dive for fish.

- Masked booby, Sula dactylatra
- Brown booby, Sula leucogaster
- Red-footed booby, Sula sula
- Abbott's booby, Papasula abbotti (A)

== Cormorants and shags ==
Order: Suliformes Family: Phalacrocoracidae

Cormorants are medium-to-large aquatic birds, usually with mainly dark plumage and areas of coloured skin on the face. The bill is long, thin and sharply hooked. Their feet are four-toed and webbed, a distinguishing feature among the order Pelecaniformes.

- Little pied cormorant, Microcarbo melanoleucos
- Little black cormorant, Phalacrocorax sulcirostris

== Pelicans ==
Order: Pelecaniformes Family: Pelecanidae

Pelicans are large water birds with distinctive pouches under their bills. Like other birds in the order Pelecaniformes, they have four webbed toes.

- Australian pelican, Pelecanus conspicillatus

== Herons, egrets, and bitterns ==
Order: Pelecaniformes Family: Ardeidae

The family Ardeidae contains the bitterns, herons, and egrets. Herons and egrets are medium to large wading birds with long necks and legs. Bitterns tend to be shorter necked and more wary. Members of Ardeidae fly with their necks retracted, unlike other long-necked birds such as storks, ibises, and spoonbills.

- Black bittern, Ixobrychus flavicollis (A)
- Great egret, Ardea alba
- Intermediate egret, Ardea intermedia
- White-faced heron, Egretta novaehollandiae
- Little egret, Egretta garzetta
- Pacific reef-heron, Egretta sacra
- Cattle egret, Bubulcus ibis
- Striated heron, Butorides striata
- Black-crowned night-heron, Nycticorax nycticorax (A)
- Nankeen night-heron, Nycticorax caledonicus

== Hawks, eagles, and kites ==
Order: Accipitriformes Family: Accipitridae

Accipitridae is a family of birds of prey, which includes hawks, eagles, kites, harriers and Old World vultures. These birds have powerful hooked beaks for tearing flesh from their prey, strong legs, powerful talons and keen eyesight.

- Letter-winged kite, Elanus scriptus
- Swamp harrier, Circus approximans
- Spotted harrier, Circus assimilis
- Chinese sparrowhawk, Accipiter soloensis (A)
- Brown goshawk, Accipiter fasciatus
- Japanese sparrowhawk, Accipiter gularis (A)

== Barn-owls ==
Order: Strigiformes Family: Tytonidae

Barn-owls are medium to large owls with large heads and characteristic heart-shaped faces. They have long strong legs with powerful talons.

- Barn owl, Tyto alba

== Owls ==
Order: Strigiformes Family: Strigidae

The typical owls are small to large solitary nocturnal birds of prey. They have large forward-facing eyes and ears, a hawk-like beak, and a conspicuous circle of feathers around each eye called a facial disk.

- Brown boobook, Ninox scutulata (A)
- Northern boobook, Ninox japonica (A)

== Kingfishers ==
Order: Coraciiformes Family: Alcedinidae

Kingfishers are medium-sized birds with large heads, long pointed bills, short legs, and stubby tails.

- Red-backed kingfisher, Todiramphus pyrrhopygius
- Forest kingfisher, Todiramphus macleayii
- Sacred kingfisher, Todiramphus sanctus
- Collared kingfisher, Todiramphus chloris (A)

== Bee-eaters ==
Order: Coraciiformes Family: Meropidae

The bee-eaters are a group of coraciiform birds in the family Meropidae. Most species are found in Africa but others occur in southern Europe, Madagascar, Australia, and New Guinea. They are characterised by richly coloured plumage, slender bodies, and usually elongated central tail feathers. All are colourful and have long downturned bills and pointed wings, which give them a swallow-like appearance when seen from afar.

- Rainbow bee-eater, Merops ornatus

== Rollers ==
Order: Coraciiformes Family: Coraciidae

Rollers resemble crows in size and build, but are more closely related to the kingfishers and bee-eaters. They share the colourful appearance of those groups with blues and browns predominating. The two inner front toes are connected, but the outer toe is not.

- Dollarbird, Eurystomus orientalis

== Falcons and caracaras ==
Order: Falconiformes Family: Falconidae

Falconidae is a family of diurnal birds of prey. They differ from hawks, eagles, and kites in that they kill with their beaks instead of their talons.

- Nankeen kestrel, Falco cenchroides
- Australian hobby, Falco longipennis (A)
- Peregrine falcon, Falco peregrinus

== Honeyeaters ==
Order: Passeriformes Family: Meliphagidae

The honeyeaters are a large and diverse family of small to medium-sized birds most common in Australia and New Guinea. They are nectar feeders and closely resemble other nectar-feeding passerines.

- Rufous-throated honeyeater, Conopophila rufogularis (A)
- Yellow chat, Epthianura crocea (A)

== Cuckooshrikes ==
Order: Passeriformes Family: Campephagidae

The cuckooshrikes are small to medium-sized passerine birds. They are predominantly greyish with white and black, although some species are brightly coloured.

- Black-faced cuckooshrike, Coracina novaehollandiae
- White-winged triller, Lalage tricolor (A)
- Common cicadabird, Edolisoma tenuirostre (A)

== Fantails ==
Order: Passeriformes Family: Rhipiduridae

The fantails are small insectivorous birds which are specialist aerial feeders.

- Arafura fantail, Rhipidura dryas

== Monarch flycatchers ==
Order: Passeriformes Family: Monarchidae

The monarch flycatchers are small to medium-sized insectivorous passerines which hunt by flycatching.

- Island monarch, Monarcha cinerascens (A)
- Spectacled monarch, Symposiachrus trivirgatus (A)
- Magpie-lark, Grallina cyanoleuca
- Broad-billed flycatcher, Myiagra ruficollis (A)

== Shrikes ==
Order: Passeriformes Family: Laniidae

Shrikes are passerine birds known for their habit of catching other birds and small animals and impaling the uneaten portions of their bodies on thorns. A typical shrike's beak is hooked, like a bird of prey.

- Tiger shrike, Lanius tigrinus (A)
- Brown shrike, Lanius cristatus (A)

== Crows, jays, and magpies ==
Order: Passeriformes Family: Corvidae

The family Corvidae includes crows, ravens, jays, choughs, magpies, treepies, nutcrackers and ground jays. Corvids are above average in size among the Passeriformes, and some of the larger species show high levels of intelligence.

- Torresian crow, Corvus orru

== Reed warblers and allies ==
Order: Passeriformes Family: Acrocephalidae

The members of this family are usually rather large for "warblers". Most are rather plain olivaceous brown above with much yellow to beige below. They are usually found in open woodland, reedbeds, or tall grass. The family occurs mostly in southern to western Eurasia and surroundings, but it also ranges far into the Pacific, with some species in Africa.

- Oriental reed warbler, Acrocephalus orientalis (A)
- Australian reed warbler, Acrocephalus australis

== Grassbirds and allies ==
Order: Passeriformes Family: Locustellidae

Locustellidae are a family of small insectivorous songbirds found mainly in Eurasia, Africa, and the Australian region. They are smallish birds with tails that are usually long and pointed, and tend to be drab brownish or buffy all over.

- Gray's grasshopper warbler, Helopsaltes fasciolatus (A)
- Pallas's grasshopper warbler, Helopsaltes certhiola (A)
- Middendorff's grasshopper warbler, Helopsaltes ochotensis (A)
- Brown songlark, Cincloramphus cruralis (A)
- Tawny grassbird, Cincloramphus timoriensis

== Swallows ==
Order: Passeriformes Family: Hirundinidae

The family Hirundinidae is adapted to aerial feeding. They have a slender streamlined body, long pointed wings and a short bill with a wide gape. The feet are adapted to perching rather than walking, and the front toes are partially joined at the base.

- Barn swallow, Hirundo rustica
- Red-rumped swallow, Cecropis daurica (A)
- Fairy martin, Petrochelidon ariel
- Tree martin, Petrochelidon nigricans

== Leaf warblers ==
Order: Passeriformes Family: Phylloscopidae

Leaf warblers are a family of small insectivorous birds found mostly in Eurasia and ranging into Wallacea and Africa. The species are of various sizes, often green-plumaged above and yellow below, or more subdued with greyish-green to greyish-brown colours.

- Yellow-browed warbler, Phylloscopus inornatus (A)
- Willow warbler, Phylloscopus trochilus (A)
- Eastern crowned warbler, Phylloscopus coronatus (A)
- Arctic warbler, Phylloscopus borealis (A)
- Kamchatka leaf warbler, Phylloscopus examinandus (A)

== White-eyes, yuhinas, and allies ==
Order: Passeriformes Family: Zosteropidae

The white-eyes are small and mostly undistinguished, their plumage above being generally some dull colour like greenish-olive, but some species have a white or bright yellow throat, breast or lower parts, and several have buff flanks. As their name suggests, many species have a white ring around each eye.

- Ashy-bellied white-eye, Zosterops citrinella (A)
- Australian yellow white-eye, Zosterops luteus (A)

== Starlings ==
Order: Passeriformes Family: Sturnidae

Starlings are small to medium-sized passerine birds. Their flight is strong and direct and they are very gregarious. Their preferred habitat is fairly open country. They eat insects and fruit. Plumage is typically dark with a metallic sheen.

- Chestnut-cheeked starling, Agropsar philippensis (A)

== Old World flycatchers ==
Order: Passeriformes Family: Muscicapidae

Old World flycatchers are a large group of small passerine birds native to the Old World. They are mainly small arboreal insectivores. The appearance of these birds is highly varied, but they mostly have weak songs and harsh calls.

- Gray-streaked flycatcher, Muscicapa griseisticta (A)
- Dark-sided flycatcher, Muscicapa sibirica (A)
- Asian brown flycatcher, Muscicapa dauurica (A)
- Blue-and-white flycatcher, Cyanoptila cyanomelana (A)
- Siberian blue robin, Larvivora cyane (A)

== Waxbills and allies ==
Order: Passeriformes Family: Estrildidae

The estrildid finches are small passerine birds of the Old World tropics and Australasia. They are gregarious and often colonial seed eaters with short thick but pointed bills. They are all similar in structure and habits, but have wide variation in plumage colours and patterns.

- Scaly-breasted munia, Lonchura punctulata
- Pale-headed munia, Lonchura pallida (A)

== Old World sparrows ==
Order: Passeriformes Family: Passeridae

Old World sparrows are small passerine birds. In general, sparrows tend to be small, plump, brown or grey birds with short tails and short powerful beaks. Sparrows are seed eaters, but they also consume small insects.

- Eurasian tree sparrow, Passer montanus (I)

== Wagtails and pipits ==
Order: Passeriformes Family: Motacillidae

Motacillidae is a family of small passerine birds with medium to long tails. They include the wagtails, longclaws and pipits. They are slender, ground feeding insectivores of open country.

- Gray wagtail, Motacilla cinerea (A)
- Eastern yellow wagtail, Motacilla tschutschensis (A)
- Pechora pipit, Anthus gustavi (A)

== See also ==
- List of birds
- Lists of birds by region
