= Australia–Indonesia border =

International maritime border between Australia and Indonesia

Indonesia–Australia border
- Australia with its outlying territories near Indonesia

Characteristics
- Entities: Indonesia; Australia

History
- Established: 1905; Australian administration of Papua
- Current shape: 2002; Independence of East Timor
- Disestablished: 1975 (land border); Papa New Guniea gains independence

The Australia–Indonesia border is a maritime boundary running west from the two countries' tripoint maritime boundary with Papua New Guinea in the western entrance to the Torres Straits, through the Arafura Sea and Timor Sea, and terminating in the Indian Ocean. The boundary is, however, broken by the Timor Gap, where Australian and East Timorese territorial waters meet and where the two countries have overlapping claims to the seabed.

Australia and Indonesia also share a common maritime border in the Indian Ocean between Australia's overseas territory of Christmas Island and the Indonesian island of Java.

A characteristic of the maritime border between the two countries is the separation of the ownership of the seabed (essentially the continental shelf) and ownership of the water column (exclusive economic zone), each with its own boundary. Ownership of the seabed gives the country rights over all mineral resources in the seabed while ownership of the water column allows a country fishing rights and rights to other resources of the water in the specified area. The 1997 treaty establishing this and the western parts of the border, as well as that between Christmas Island and Java, has however not been ratified and is not in force. This was because the independence of East Timor required amendments to the 1997 treaty and agreement over them by the two parties is still pending.

== The Border ==
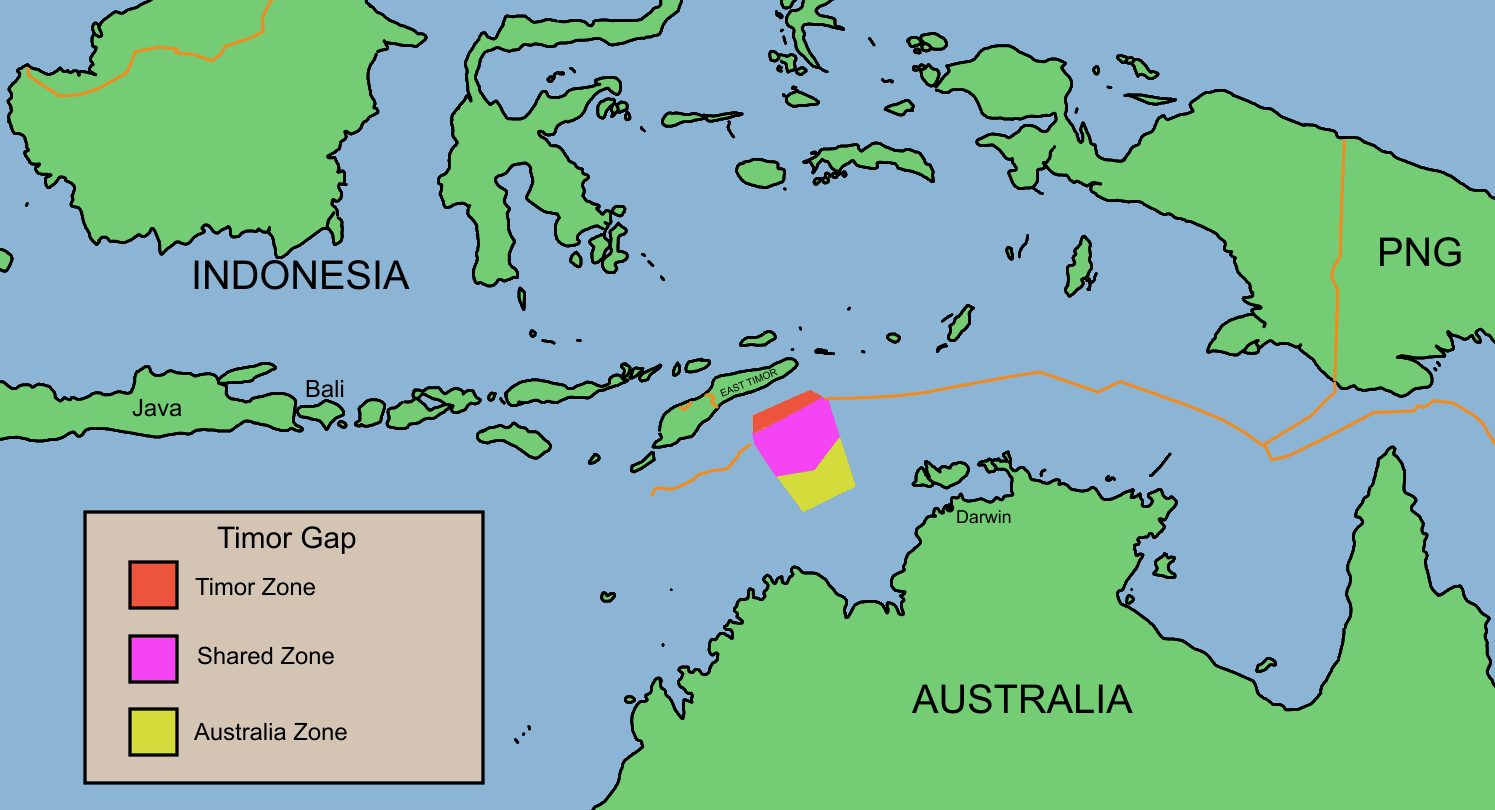
Australia–Indonesia border and the Timor Gap

The boundary is separated into three segments, with the first two broken by the Timor Gap. The first is between the Australia – Indonesia – Papua New Guinea tripoint at 10°50′S 139°12′E, and the point whether the territorial waters of the two countries touch the eastern limits of the territorial waters claimed by East Timor at 9°28′S 127°56′E. The second segment runs westward from the point where the territorial waters of the two countries touch the western limits of East Timor's territorial waters claim at 10°28′S 126°00′E, to 13°05′27.0″S 118°10′08.9″E in the Indian Ocean. The third is between the Australian external territory of Christmas Island and the Indonesia island of Java, in the Indian Ocean.

The boundary is established by four treaties, the fourth of which has been signed but not yet ratified. The Agreement between the Government of the Commonwealth of Australia and the Government of the Republic of Indonesia establishing Certain Seabed Boundaries signed in Canberra on 18 May 1971 established part of the eastern segment of the seabed boundary (as well as Indonesia's maritime boundary with Papua New Guinea in the Torres Straits) while the Agreement between the Government of the Commonwealth of Australia and the Government of the Republic of Indonesia establishing certain seabed boundaries in the area of the Timor and Arafura Seas, Supplementary to the Agreement of 18 May 1971 which was signed in Jakarta on 9 October 1972 demarcated the rest of the eastern segment and a portion of the western segment of the seabed boundary. A third agreement, Agreement between Australia and Indonesia concerning Certain Boundaries between Papua New Guinea and Indonesia established the demarcation between the soon to be independent Papua New Guinea and Indonesia was signed in Jakarta on 12 February 1973. A fourth treaty, the Treaty between the Government of Australia and the Government of the Republic of Indonesia establishing an Exclusive Economic Zone Boundary and Certain Seabed Boundaries (informally known as the Australia–Indonesia Maritime Delimitation Treaty) which was signed in Perth on 14 March 1997 (however not ratified), proposes to extended the western segment of the seabed boundary to its termination point in the Indian Ocean.

The basis for establishing the boundary in the 1971 and 1972 treaties was that of the "natural prolongation" of the physical continental shelf. This resulted in the boundary running significantly north of the median line between the shores of Australia and Indonesia, thus benefiting Australia in terms of the division of the seabed ownership. The International Law view of settling overlapping claims has since then moved towards the median-line concept, although Australia still holds the view that natural prolongation was still relevant to determine the sovereignty of the seabed. This resulted in the separate treatment of establishing the seabed boundary and that for the water column, or essentially, the separation of the continental shelf and exclusive economic zone boundaries under the 1997 treaty.

The independence of East Timor on 20 May 2002 may result in changes in the Australia–Indonesia border near the Timor Gap which were established by the three treaties. Provisions of the 1997 treaty on matters concerning the Timor Gap – such as reaffirming the Timor Gap Treaty between Australia and Indonesia and the drawing of the water column boundary through the area of joint development – would no longer be applicable with East Timor becoming the rightful claimant of the seabed and exclusive economic zone in the area. Furthermore, the "Timor Gap terminal points" established by the 1972 treaty, namely Points A16 and A17, might have to be renegotiated by Australia, East Timor and Indonesia, as East Timor might have the basis to seek a "wider" Timor Gap than originally provided by Australia and Indonesia.

=== Seabed (continental shelf) boundary ===
==== Eastern segment ====
The eastern segment of the boundary was established by both the 1971 and 1972 treaties, the former delimiting the border from A3 to A12 and the latter extending it from A12 to A16, which lies on the eastern border of the Australia – East Timor joint petroleum development area. Points A1, A2 and A3 form part of the Indonesia – Papua New Guinea border which was also established under the 1971 treaty when Papua New Guinea was still an Australian territory.

Point	Longitude (E)	Latitude (S)	Remarks
Australia, Indonesia and Papua New Guinea common tripoint
A3	139° 12'	10° 50'	
Eastern segment of the Australia-Indonesia seabed boundary
A4	138° 38'	10° 24'	
A5	138° 35'	10° 22'	
A6	138° 13'	10° 9'	
A7	137° 45'	9° 57'	
A8	135° 29'	9° 8'	
A9	135° 13'	9° 17'	
A10	135° 3'	9° 22'	
A11	134° 50'	9° 25'	
A12	133° 23'	8° 53'	
A13	133° 14'	8° 54'	
A14	130° 10'	9° 25'	
A15	128°	9° 25'	
A16	127° 56'	9° 28'	This point lies on the eastern border of the Australia-East Timor joint petroleum development area, may be subject to change after negotiations with East Timor

==== Western segment ====
The 1972 treaty brought the boundary to Point A25 to the north-east of Australia's Ashmore Island. The 1997 treaty extended it further west, terminating at A82 in the Indian Ocean where Australia's and Indonesia's exclusive economic zone limits diverge.

Point	Longitude (E)	Latitude (S)	Remarks
Western segment of the Australia-Indonesia seabed boundary pursuant to 1972 treaty
A17	126°	10° 28'	This point lies on the western border of the Australia-East Timor joint petroleum development area, may be subject to change after negotiations with East Timor
A18	125° 41'	10° 37'	
A19	125° 19'	11° 1'	
A20	124° 34'	11° 7'	
A21	124° 10'	11° 25'	
A22	124°	11° 26'	
A23	123° 40'	11° 28'	
A24	123° 26'	11° 23'	
A25	123° 14'	11° 35'	
Western extension of the boundary pursuant to 1997 treaty
A26	123° 14' 4.5"	11° 48' 6.1"	
A27	123° 13' 38.1"	11° 47' 59.3"	
A28	123° 12' 12.7"	11° 47' 40.3"	
A29	123° 12' 5.1"	11° 47' 38.9"	
A30	123° 11' 2.9"	11° 47' 25.6"	
A31	123° 5' 27.9"	11° 46' 25.7"	
A32	123° 0' 49.7"	11° 46' 31.8"	
A33	122° 59' 22.9"	11° 46' 44.2"	
A34	122° 57' 32.5"	11° 47' 07.4"	
A35	122° 56' 8.2"	11° 47' 31"	
A36	122° 53' 24.7"	11° 48' 32.1"	
A37	122° 50' 34.5"	11° 50' 0.6"	
A38	122° 49' 19.9"	11° 50' 48.1"	
A39	122° 48' 5.1"	11° 51' 12.9"	
A40	122° 47' 38.9"	11° 51' 22.4"	
A41	122° 46' 21.2"	11° 51' 53.3"	
A42	122° 44' 16.8"	11° 52' 53.4"	
A43	122° 41' 4.3"	11° 54' 56.3"	
A44	122° 40' 0.5"	11° 55' 46.7"	
A45	122° 35' 27.9"	12° 0' 41.4"	
A46	122° 34' 33.8"	12° 2' 5"	
A47	122° 33' 55.8"	12° 3' 12.2"	
A48	122° 32' 24.1"	12° 6' 44.6"	The border then proceeds southerly in an arc of a circle drawn concave to Ashmore Island with a radius of 24 nautical miles (44 km) to Point A49
A49	122° 31' 6.6"	12° 14' 25.8"	
A50	120° 0' 46.9"	13° 56' 31.7"	
A51	120° 0' 46.9"	12° 46' 27.9"	
A52	119° 59' 31"	12° 45' 47"	
A53	119° 59' 15"	12° 45' 38"	
A54	119° 56' 13"	12° 43' 46"	
A55	119° 53' 18"	12° 41' 57"	
A56	119° 52' 57"	12° 41' 46"	
A57	119° 52' 38"	12° 41' 36"	
A58	119° 50' 28"	12° 40' 33"	
A59	119° 40' 33"	12° 35' 43"	
A60	119° 33' 16"	12° 32' 31"	
A61	12° 29' 19"	119° 27' 17"	
A62	12° 25' 43"	119° 21' 35"	
A63	12° 24' 59"	119° 20' 34"	
A64	12° 23' 58"	119° 16' 35"	
A65	12° 23' 42"	119° 15' 23"	
A66	12° 21' 51"	119° 9' 3"	
A67	12° 20' 21"	119° 5' 0"	
A68	12° 19' 55"	119° 2' 40"	
A69	12° 18' 50"	118° 58' 31"	
A70	12° 17' 54"	118° 55' 12"	
A71	12° 15' 57"	118° 49' 30"	
A72	12° 13' 12"	118° 43' 9"	
A73	12° 11' 1"	118° 39' 0"	
A74	12° 10' 26"	118° 37' 28"	
A75	12° 10' 6"	118° 35' 16"	
A76	12° 7' 46"	118° 25' 07"	
A77	12° 6' 21"	118° 20' 45"	
A78	12° 4' 19"	118° 7' 44"	
A79	12° 4' 8.8"	118° 6' 14.4"	
A80	12° 4' 24.9"	118° 6' 17.2"	
A81	12° 49' 54.8"	118° 14' 22.6"	
A82	13° 5' 27.0"	118° 10' 8.9"	

==== Christmas Island/Java segment ====
Christmas Island is an external territory of Australia located in the Indian Ocean 186 nautical miles (344 km) south of the southern coast of Java. The maritime boundary between the island and Indonesia which was established by the 1997 treaty is a modified median line which lies closer to the island by virtue of it being an isolated island lying next to the coastline of a larger country. The boundary generally runs east–west and terminates both ends where the boundary of the Australian exclusive economic zone created around Christmas Island diverges from the Indonesian EEZ. Unlike the boundary in the Arafura and Timor Seas, there are no separate boundaries for the seabed and water column.

Point	Longitude (E)	Latitude (S)
Christmas Island/Java boundary
C1	109° 1' 25.8"	11° 10' 24.6"
C2	105° 50' 55.4"	9° 46' 49.8"
C3	102° 34' 12.7"	8° 52' 14.1"

=== Water column (exclusive economic zone) boundary ===
A separate "water column boundary", essentially an exclusive economic zone boundary for the ownership of fishery resources, was created under the 1997 treaty. The boundary starts from the Australia-Indonesia-Papua New Guinea tripoint at 10°50′00″S 139°12′00″E, which is Point A3 of the seabed boundary and designated as Point Z1 of the water column boundary. It runs to the south of the Australia-Indonesia seabed boundary and terminates in the Indian Ocean where the Australian and Indonesia EEZ diverge. The boundary essentially follows the Provisional Fisheries Surveillance and Enforcement Line (PFSEL), a non-treaty status agreement made in 1981 between the two countries, and is generally based on the median line principle measures from the Australian mainland and Indonesian archipelagic baseline.

The 1997 treaty essentially separates the sovereignty of the seabed and water column in the area between the water column boundary and the seabed boundary, whereby Australia has sovereignty over the seabed and its resources, while Indonesia has sovereignty over the water column and the resources which live in it.

Although the 1997 treaty did not "close" the Timor Gap by establishing the seabed boundary in the area, it however established the water column boundary, which virtually corresponded with the boundary between Zone A and Zone B under the Timor Gap Treaty. With the independence of East Timor, this stretch of the water column boundary between Point Z28 and Point Z36 was no longer applicable. The stretch is now replaced with a "water column jurisdiction" line drawn by the Treaty on Certain Maritime Arrangements in the Timor Sea between Australia and East Timor signed on 12 January 2006 which corresponds with the southern border of the Australia-East Timor Joint Petroleum Development Area (JPDA), with Australia having control over the water column south of the line, and East Timor to the north including over the entire JPDA.

Point	Longitude (E)	Latitude (S)	Remarks
Australia-Indonesia water column (EEZ) boundary
Z1	139° 12' 00"	10° 50' 00"	
Z2	138° 38' 00"	10° 24' 00"	
Z3	138° 35' 00"	10° 22' 00"	
Z4	138° 13' 00"	10° 09' 00"	
Z5	137° 45' 00"	9° 57' 00"	
Z6	135° 29' 00"	9° 08' 00"	
Z7	135° 13' 00"	9° 17' 00"	
Z8	135° 03' 00"	9° 22' 00"	
Z9	134° 50' 00"	9° 25' 00"	
Z10	133° 23' 00"	8° 53' 00"	
Z11	132° 46' 00"	9° 06' 00"	
Z12	132° 33' 00"	9° 14' 00"	
Z13	132° 30' 00"	9° 16' 00"	
Z14	132° 20' 00"	9° 20' 00"	
Z15	132° 12' 00"	9° 23' 00"	
Z16	131° 57' 00"	9° 31' 00"	
Z17	131° 52' 00"	9° 33' 00"	
Z18	131° 43' 00"	9° 36' 00"	
Z19	131° 31' 00"	9° 40' 00"	
Z20	131° 28' 00"	9° 42' 00"	
Z21	130° 55' 00"	9° 47' 00"	
Z22	130° 43' 00"	9° 45' 00"	
Z23	130° 06' 00"	9° 39' 00"	
Z24	129° 30' 00"	9° 45' 00"	
Z25	129° 01' 00"	9° 59' 00"	
Z26	128° 18' 00"	10° 26' 00"	
Z27	128° 14' 00"	10° 28' 00"	
Z28	128° 12' 28.4"	10° 29' 11.8"	No longer applicable with East Timor's independence
Z29	127° 59' 20.4"	10° 43' 37.8"	No longer applicable with East Timor's independence
Z30	127° 48' 49.4"	10° 53' 36.8"	No longer applicable with East Timor's independence
Z31	127° 47' 08.4"	10° 55' 20.8"	No longer applicable with East Timor's independence
Z32	127° 31' 37.4"	11° 14' 18.9"	No longer applicable with East Timor's independence
Z33	126° 58' 17.4"	11° 17' 24.9"	No longer applicable with East Timor's independence
Z34	126° 57' 11.4"	11° 17' 30.9"	No longer applicable with East Timor's independence
Z35	126° 47' 08.4"	11° 19' 40.9"	No longer applicable with East Timor's independence
Z36	126° 31' 58.4"	11° 20' 02.9"	No longer applicable with East Timor's independence
Z37	126° 31' 00"	11° 20' 00"	
Z38	126° 28' 00"	11° 21' 00"	
Z39	126° 12' 00"	11° 26' 00"	
Z40	126° 00' 00"	11° 31' 00"	
Z41	125° 45' 00"	11° 37' 00"	
Z42	125° 25' 00"	11° 45' 00"	
Z43	125° 20' 00"	11° 47' 00"	
Z44	123° 33' 55.1"	12° 15' 34.4"	thence northerly along the arc of a circle drawn concave to Ashmore Islands with a radius of 24 nautical miles (44 km) to the following point
Z45	123° 33' 55.8"	12° 14' 46.7"	
Thence generally northerly, north-westerly, westerly, south-westerly, and southerly along a series of intersecting circular arcs drawn concave to Ashmore Islands with a radius of 24 nautical miles (44 km) and having the following vertices:-
Z46	123° 33' 50.3"	12° 12' 43.7"	
Z47	123° 33' 19.1"	12° 09' 21.0"	
Z48	123° 32' 57.8"	12° 07' 56.3"	
Z49	123° 32' 42.5"	12° 07' 04.6"	
Z50	123° 31' 45.6"	12° 04' 15.3"	
Z51	123° 30' 32.4"	12° 01' 34.7"	
Z52	123° 29' 41.2"	12° 00' 01.1"	
Z53	123° 29' 08.7"	11° 59' 08.6"	
Z54	123° 28' 56.2"	11° 58' 49.6"	
Z55	123° 28' 54.5"	11° 58' 46.9"	
Z56	123° 27' 32.8"	11° 56' 52.6"	
Z57	123° 25' 59.8"	11° 55' 05.8"	
Z58	123° 21' 44.0"	11° 51' 32.1"	
Z59	123° 19' 07.9"	11° 50' 02.2"	
Z60	123° 18' 32.9"	11° 49' 45.0"	
Z61	123° 16' 44.4"	11° 48' 58.5"	
Z62	123° 15' 32.5"	11° 48' 32.5"	
Z63	123° 13' 38.1"	11° 47' 59.3"	
Z64	123° 12' 12.7"	11° 47' 40.3"	
Z65	123° 12' 05.2"	11° 47' 38.9"	
Z66	123° 11' 02.9"	11° 47' 25.6"	
Z67	123° 05' 27.9"	11° 46' 25.7"	
Z68	123° 00' 49.7"	11° 46' 31.8"	
Z69	122° 59' 22.9"	11° 46' 44.2"	
Z70	122° 57' 32.5"	11° 47' 07.4"	
Z71	122° 56' 08.2"	11° 47' 31.0"	
Z72	122° 53' 24.7"	11° 48' 32.1"	
Z73	122° 50' 34.5"	11° 50' 00.6"	
Z74	122° 49' 19.9"	11° 50' 48.1"	
Z75	122° 48' 05.1"	11° 51' 12.9"	
Z76	122° 47' 38.9"	11° 51' 22.4"	
Z77	122° 46' 21.2"	11° 51' 53.3"	
Z78	122° 44' 16.8"	11° 52' 53.4"	
Z79	122° 41' 04.3"	11° 54' 56.3"	
Z80	122° 40' 00.5"	11° 55' 46.7"	
Z81	122° 35' 27.9"	12° 00' 41.4"	
Z82	122° 34' 33.8"	12° 02' 05.0"	
Z83	122° 33' 55.8"	12° 03' 12.2"	
Z84	122° 32' 24.1"	12° 06' 44.6"	
Thence southerly along the arc of a circle drawn concave to Ashmore Islands with a radius of 24 nautical miles (44 km) to the point:
Z85	122° 31' 06.6"	12° 14' 25.8"	
Z86	122° 31' 06.6"	12° 50' 28.2"	
Z87	121° 49' 00"	13° 15' 00"	
Z88	120° 00' 46.9"	13° 56' 31.7"	
Thence north-westerly along the arc of a circle with a radius of 200 nautical miles (370 km) drawn through the following points:
Z89	119° 52' 30.7"	13° 53' 03.7"	
Z90	119° 44' 24.5"	13° 49' 14.5"	
Z91	119° 36' 29.3"	13° 45' 04.5"	
To the point:
Z92	119° 28' 46.1"	13° 40' 34.1"	
Z93	119° 22' 08.7"	13° 36' 30.2"	
Thence north-westerly along the arc of a circle with a radius of 200 nautical miles (370 km) drawn through the following points:
Z94	119° 13' 33.5"	13° 34' 26.1"	
Z95	119° 05' 04.4"	13° 32' 00.1"	
Z96	118° 56' 42.4"	13° 29' 12.5"	
Z97	118° 48' 28.4"	13° 26' 03.7"	
Z98	118° 40' 23.4"	13° 22' 34.0"	
Z99	118° 32' 28.3"	13° 18' 43.8"	
To the point:
Z100	118° 24' 44.1"	13° 14' 33.6"	

== History ==
Indonesia had a land border with Australia before Papua New Guinea gained independence in 1975. It follows the 141st meridian.

== Disputes ==
With the signing of the 1997 Australia–Indonesia Maritime Delimitation Treaty, most grey areas between the two countries, whose relations have at various stages ranged from cordial to downright hostile, concerning their common maritime boundary could be deemed to have been settled. This includes not only the question of sovereignty over the seabed but also the ownership of resources inhabiting the water column above the seabed. The earlier dispute over the sovereignty of the seabed in the area known as the Timor Gap also ended with the secession and independence of East Timor.

The following were areas of disputes in the historical context.

=== Boundary delimitation principle ===
The first two treaties to establish the seabed boundary between Australia and Indonesia utilised the "natural prolongation of the continental shelf" principle. Especially for the second treaty, Australia argued that the deep Timor Trough was the natural edge of its continental shelf. The resulting boundary was therefore located closer to Indonesia and had potentially denied considerable share of petroleum resources from the seabed.

Despite the principle being agreed to via negotiations, its use had been a constant point of discontent on the part of the Indonesians, with its former Foreign Minister Mochtar Kusumaatmadja saying that the country had been "taken to the cleaners" by Australia. With the 1982 United Nations Convention on the Law of the Sea, Indonesia argued that the median line – the equidistant line from the baselines of both countries – was the correct location of the boundary. The growing strength of Indonesia's argument over Australia's natural prolongation principle had a significant bearing on the subsequent treaties between the two countries, namely the Timor Gap Treaty of 1989 and the 1997 Australia–Indonesia Maritime Delimitation Treaty.

The differing principles on where the boundary was to be located resulted in the inability to reach agreement to close the Timor Gap with a permanent maritime boundary. A resources sharing joint development area arrangement instead had to be agreed to. Further details on this in the following section.

The 1997 treaty saw Australia's natural prolongation argument prevail as far as the seabed (essentially the continental shelf) claim is concerned. However, Indonesia's median line argument was accepted for establishing its rights over the water column or exclusive economic zone, resulting in the separation of the two types of boundaries. The treaty recognises Indonesia's full ownership of living resources in the water north of the water column boundary and south of the seabed boundary. The water column boundary, essentially the median line, has in fact been a de facto EEZ boundary since such a line was established by the Provisional Fisheries Surveillance and Enforcement Line (PFSEL) which was agreed to in 1981.

=== Timor Gap ===
Australia and Indonesia were engaged in negotiations to solve a dispute over overlapping claims to the continental shelf in the Timor Gap when East Timor was annexed and became part of Indonesian territory in 1975. After the two earlier seabed boundary treaties, Indonesia was determined that the seabed boundary that would close the Timor Gap would lie along the median line between the two countries. Australia however saw that its continental shelf should stretch to the Timor Trough, a deep trench in the Timor Sea which was located 40 nautical miles (74 km) from the southern shore of Timor and at least 250 nautical miles (460 km) from Australia.

Talks began in 1979 but there was no agreement over the permanent maritime boundary. Instead, the two countries settled for a "sovereignty neutral" agreement in 1989 which allowed joint exploitation and equal sharing of petroleum resources in a "zone of cooperation" which lay in between the extremes of the claims by the two countries.

The 1989 treaty was no longer valid once East Timor seceded from Indonesia in 1999, and the new state was not bound by the treaty. Indonesia had also informed Australia later that year that it was no longer bound by the Timor Gap Treaty.

The dispute over the Timor Gap now is between Australia and East Timor and does not involve Indonesia. However, Indonesia may have to become a party in negotiations to establish the Australia-East Timor-Indonesia border tripoints if East Timor chooses not to be bound by the current "width" of the Timor Gap decided by Australia and Indonesia (through the 1972 treaty) without consultation with the East Timorese, or with Portugal, the colonial administrator of East Timor at the time.

== See also ==
- Australia–Indonesia relations
- MOU Box
- Timor Sea Treaty
