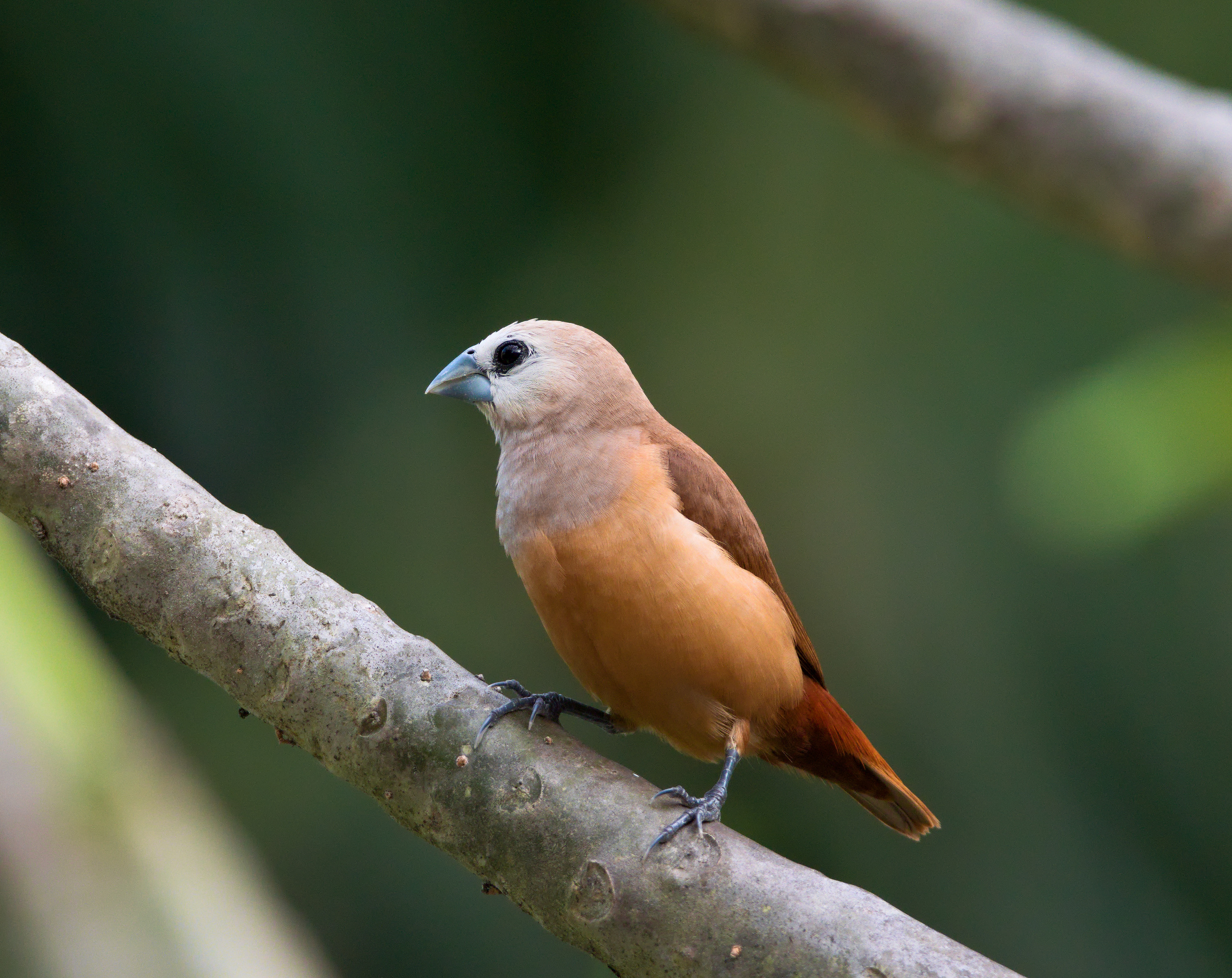

Conservation status
- Least Concern (IUCN 3.1)

Scientific classification
- Kingdom: Animalia
- Phylum: Chordata
- Class: Aves
- Order: Passeriformes
- Family: Estrildidae
- Genus: Lonchura
- Species: L. pallida

Binomial name
- Lonchura pallida (Wallace, 1864)

= Pale-headed munia =

Species of bird

The pale-headed munia (Lonchura pallida) is a species of estrildid finch native to eastern Indonesia and Timor-Leste. It inhabits subtropical and tropical lowlands, dry shrubland, grassland, marshes and agricultural areas. The species has shown recent range expansion due to increasing agriculture and land clearance. It has recently crossed the Wallace Line to establish breeding populations on Nusa Penida, and is now recorded on Bali. It has also become an increasingly frequent vagrant in northwestern Australia from the 2020s onward, with arrivals likely aided by monsoon winds and cyclones.

== Taxonomy ==
The species was first described by the British naturalist Alfred Russel Wallace in 1864 under the binomial Munia pallida, based on specimens from the Lesser Sunda Islands. Its type locality is generally given as Lombok and Flores.

It is now placed in the genus Lonchura and is commonly regarded as having no subspecies. A population described as Lonchura pallida subcastanea from the Palu Valley of Sulawesi is generally considered synonymous with the nominate form.

The pale-headed munia belongs to a complex of pale-capped species within Lonchura, including the white-headed munia (L. maja), with which it is sometimes confused.

== Etymology ==
The genus name Lonchura combines the Ancient Greek words lonkhē (λόγχη, "spear-head" or "lance") and oura (οὐρά, "tail"), referring to the pointed or lance-shaped tail feathers characteristic of many munias. The species name pallida is Latin for "pale", alluding to the bird's diagnostically pale head plumage, which contrasts with the darker body and was noted in the species' original 1864 description.

== Description ==
The pale-headed munia is a small finch measuring approximately 10–11cm in length and weighing around 10–15g, with a striking white or pale buff head contrasting against a dark body. Adults are rich chestnut brown above, with a reddish-brown tail and a pale buff to peach-washed underside. The bill is pale blue-grey, the iris dark brown, and legs pale bluish-grey. Juveniles are much duller and browner overall but typically show a paler head. No significant sexual dimorphism is noted.

=== Similar species ===
Pale-headed munia can be distinguished from the white-headed munia by its reddish-brown rather than chestnut brown tail, tan-coloured rather than chestnut brown flanks, and the absence of the latter species' contrasting black or very dark brown belly patch. The pale-headed munia typically has a pale buff to creamy-white head, while the second species usually has a pure, snowy white head.

Juveniles differ from those of the five-coloured munia (L. quinticolor) by having a noticeably smaller bill and paler head.

Vagrants in northern Australia may be confused with the indigenous yellow-rumped mannikin. While both birds have pale heads, brown upper parts and pale underparts, the Australian species has a diagnostically yellow rump and upper tail-coverts, which contrast with its darker brown back. The pale-headed munia has brownish upper parts and a rump that is much less contrasting than the local species.

== Range and distribution ==
The species' historical range includes central and south Sulawesi, Kalaotoa, Madu, and the Lesser Sundas, excluding Bali. It occurs in dry shrub and grassland habitats, including marshes, croplands, and scrub in the lowlands. Abundance varies: it is locally common in the north of Flores, uncommon on Sumba, and common on Lombok.

The pale-headed munia was only recently added to the official list of birds resident on the island of Timor, where it is generally assumed to be indigenous, having possibly just evaded notice during previous official bird surveys. It was first formally recorded on the island in 1998.

=== Expansion ===
The species appears to be expanding on Sulawesi due to land clearance and farming.

While records have previously listed the species' westernmost limit as Lombok, it has apparently recently jumped the Wallace Line—a major biogeographic boundary separating Asian and Australasian fauna—and is now breeding on Nusa Penida, just off Bali. A 2008 local bird checklist omits the species and it is not present in other recent Bali-area guides. The timeline and mechanism of this apparent colonisation is unclear, but a bird was photographed there in March 2019 and a number of flocks including juveniles have been photographed on the island from at least 2023 onwards.

Birds were photographed near the Unda River mouth in eastern Bali in 2025, indicating possible recent colonisation of the island.

=== Australia ===
Pale-headed munias have increasingly been sighted in Western Australia, with records first beginning in the 2020s. A single individual was photographed at Arrow Pearling Base on the Dampier Peninsula in February 2022. There was a claimed sighting of another bird on Troughton Island on the Kimberley coast in December 2024, and at least nine birds were photographed on the same island in late January 2026, after landing there amid strong winds from Cyclone Luana. There is an approximate 450-600 kilometre distance between Troughton Island and the species' closest known populations, centring on Timor.

The Troughton flock reportedly disappeared from the 0.93 km^{2} island after a few days, possibly dispersing to the nearby Australian mainland. Three pale headed munias were spotted on Troughton over a week after the initial group's disappearance. It is unknown if they were returnees from the original flock or new birds, but it is speculated they may have been assisted back to the island from the mainland by a southerly wind.

A dead juvenile pale-headed munia was found on Western Australia's Browse Island, off the Kimberly Coast, in October 2026.

Prior to the Western Australian arrivals, the species' Australian records had been confined to sightings of vagrants approximately 320 kilometres off the Australian coast, on the country's external territory of the Ashmore and Cartier Islands. One group of three munias was recorded there in February 2000, and a pair was noted in January 2003.

=== Trends in vagrancy ===
Both single birds and flocks have been recorded in cases of extreme geographical dispersal beyond its established range. Australian records of pale-headed munias have occurred during the northwest wet season, which is often marked by monsoon or cyclonic winds, suggesting storm-assisted movement from Timor or other nearby islands.

== Behaviour and ecology ==
The species is highly gregarious, commonly travelling and feeding in large flocks, sometimes of up to 200 individuals, and often in the company of other small estrildids. It often roosts communally, gathering in vegetation or reed beds at dusk.

=== Diet ===
Pale-headed munias are primarily seed-eaters, although some insects are taken. They forage on grasses and cultivated grains in open habitats, shrub lands, and modified landscapes such as rice fields. The species appears to have benefited from grain production in parts of Indonesia.

=== Breeding ===
Breeding pairs go to nest during periods of high food availability, usually the wet season, building domed or globular nests concealed in shrubs or tall grass. A typical clutch consists of 4 to 6 white eggs, incubated by both parents for about 12 to 14 days. Chicks are fed regurgitated seeds and some insects by both parents, and fledge after approximately 21 days.

=== Vocalisations ===
The species produces weak, high-pitched "weee" contact calls and stronger, metallic "wit-wit-wit" notes, often given in flight or while foraging in flocks.

== Conservation status ==
The pale-headed munia is classified as Least Concern by the IUCN. The global population has not been quantified but the species is described as common or stable within its range. Its very large range (extent of occurrence ≈1,130,000 km²) buffers it against threats. The species has locally benefited from agricultural expansion and land clearance, with no major declines or substantial threats identified.

== In captivity ==
It is kept and traded as a cage bird across its range in Indonesia, raising the potential for over-exploitation. Market surveys conducted in Mataram, Lombok in 2018–2019 recorded 130 individuals offered for sale across multiple visits, making it one of the more abundant species on sale. All observed trade was technically illegal, as no harvest quotas existed for the species at the time; most birds appeared to be locally sourced rather than part of large-scale national or international supply chains.

The species is sometimes offered for sale in Europe and North America, where it has been bred in captivity using standard munia husbandry techniques, but it is not as widely known or traded as the white headed munia. It is held by some European zoos, such as Plzen Zoo in the Czech Republic. The species is not believed to be present in captivity in Australia, where new imports of exotic estrildids are presently illegal.

No large-scale captive-breeding programs are known, and the species is not part of any formal ex-situ conservation efforts.

== See also ==
- Estrildidae – the family to which the pale-headed munia belongs
- Lonchura – the genus of munias
- White-headed munia – a closely related and visually similar Southeast Asian species
- Yellow-rumped munia – a similar Australian member of the genus
- Wallace Line – a major biogeographical boundary crossed by the species during its recent range expansion
- Bird migration – relevant to the species' exceptional movements into northwestern Australia
