= Ashmore Reef Marine Park =

Protected marine park in Australia

- IUCN category Ia (strict nature reserve)
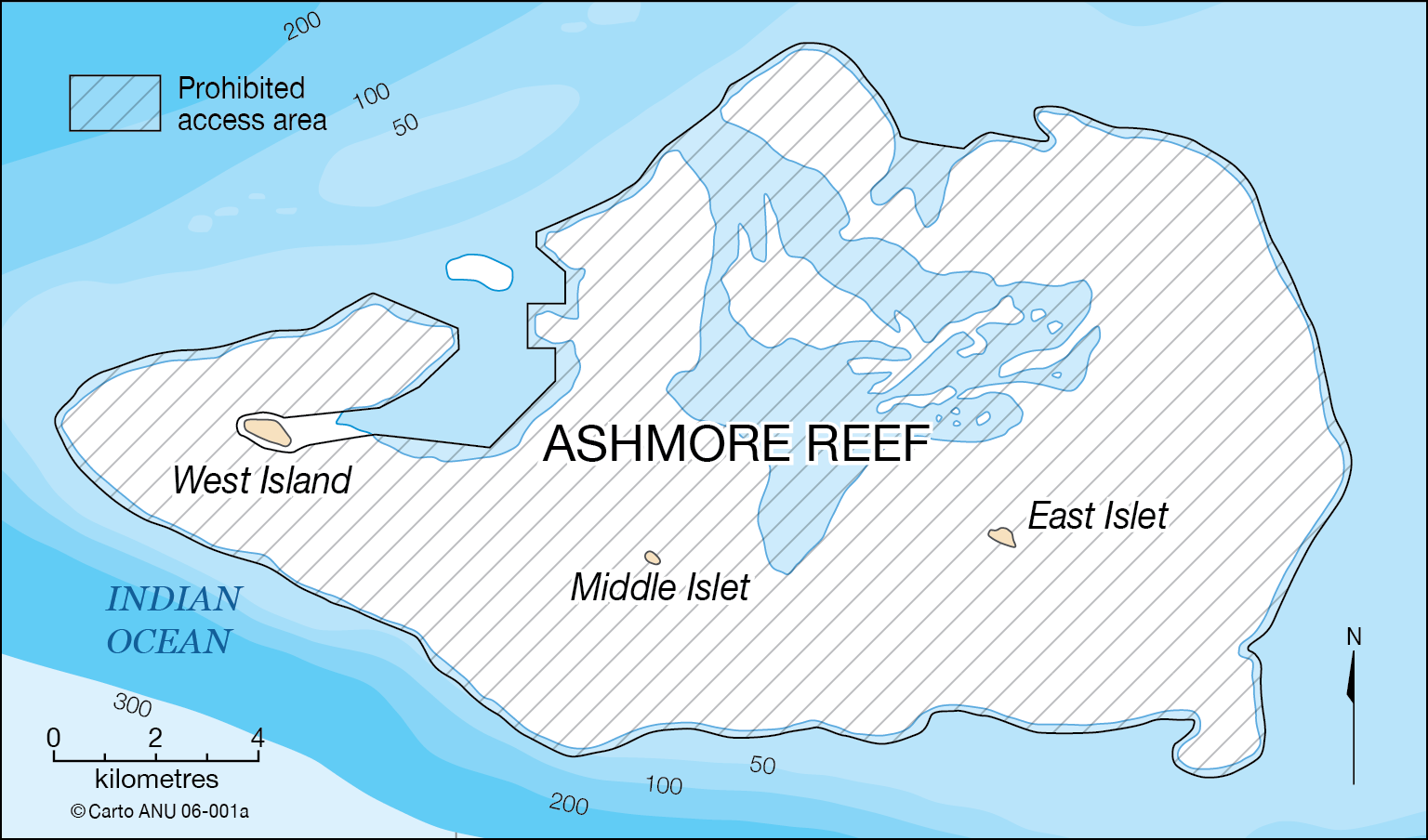
- Map showing the Ashmore Reef Marine Park. The shaded area is a Sanctuary Zone ('no take' zone).
- Location: Australia
- Coordinates: 12.2486°S 123.0763°E
- Area: 583 km^{2} (225 sq mi)
- Established: 16 August 1983
- Operator: Parks Australia
- Website: parksaustralia.gov.au/marine/parks/north-west/ashmore-reef/

Ramsar Wetland
- Official name: Ashmore Reef Commonwealth Marine Reserve
- Designated: 21 October 2002
- Reference no.: 1220

The Ashmore Reef Marine Park (formerly known as the Ashmore Reef National Nature Reserve) is an Australian marine park that covers the Ashmore Reef, which is located about 630 km (390 mi) north of Broome and 110 km (68 mi) south of the Indonesian island of Rote. The marine park covers an area of 583 km^{2} (225 sq mi) and is assigned IUCN category Ia. It is one of 13 parks managed under the North-west Marine Parks Network.

The Ashmore Reef Marine Park is within an area known as the MOU Box, a region that permits for continued Indonesian traditional fishing and access.

== Conservation values ==
The Ashmore Reef is of significant biodiversity value as it is in the flow of the Indonesian Throughflow ocean current from the Pacific Ocean through Maritime Southeast Asia to the Indian Ocean. It is also in a surface current west from the Arafura Sea and Timor Sea.

In 2003 the nature reserve was recognised as a wetland of international importance due to the importance of its islands providing a resting place for migratory shorebirds and supporting large seabird breeding colonies. It was designated Ramsar Site 1220 under the Ramsar Convention on Wetlands.

=== Species and habitat ===
- The marine park comprises several marine habitats, including seagrass meadows, intertidal sand flats, coral reef flats, and lagoons, and supports an important and diverse range of species, including 14 species of sea snakes, a population of dugong that may be genetically distinct, a diverse marine invertebrate fauna, and many endemic species, especially of sea snakes and molluscs. There are feeding and nesting sites for loggerhead, hawksbill and green turtles.
- It is classified as an Important Bird Area and has 50,000 breeding pairs of various kinds of seabirds.
- A high abundance and diversity of sea cucumbers, over-exploited on other reefs in the region, is present, with 45 species recorded.
- Support some of the most important seabird rookeries on the North West Shelf including colonies of bridled terns, common noddies, brown boobies, eastern reef egrets, frigatebirds, tropicbirds, red-footed booby, roseate terns, crested terns and lesser crested terns.
- Important staging points/feeding areas for many migratory seabirds.

=== Bioregion, ecology and heritage ===
- Ecosystems, habitats and communities associated with the North West Shelf and Timor Province provincial bioregions, and emergent oceanic reefs.
- Indonesian artefacts.
- Indonesian grave sites.

== History ==
The marine park was originally proclaimed under the National Parks and Wildlife Conservation Act 1975 on 16 August 1983 as the Ashmore Reef National Nature Reserve. It was proclaimed under the EPBC Act on 14 December 2013 as a Commonwealth Marine Reserve and renamed Ashmore Reef Marine Park on 9 October 2017.

== Summary of protection zones ==
The Ashmore Reef Marine Park has been assigned IUCN protected area category Ia. However, within the marine park there are two protection zones, each zone has an IUCN category and related rules for managing activities to ensure the protection of marine habitats and species.

The following table is a summary of the zoning rules within the Ashmore Reef Marine Park:

Zone	IUCN	Activities permitted						Total area (km^{2})
Zone	IUCN	Vessel transiting	Recreational fishing	Commercial fishing	Commercial aquaculture	Commercial tourism	Mining	Total area (km^{2})
Sanctuary Zone	Ia	No	No	No	No	aviation only, with approval	No	550
Recreational Use	II	Yes	Yes	No	No	excludes fishing, with approval	No	34
External link: Zoning and rules for the North-west Marine Parks Network

== See also ==
- Protected areas managed by the Australian government
