= Cartier Island =

Sand cay in the Timor Sea

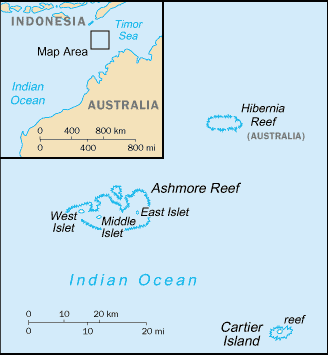
Ashmore and Cartier Islands

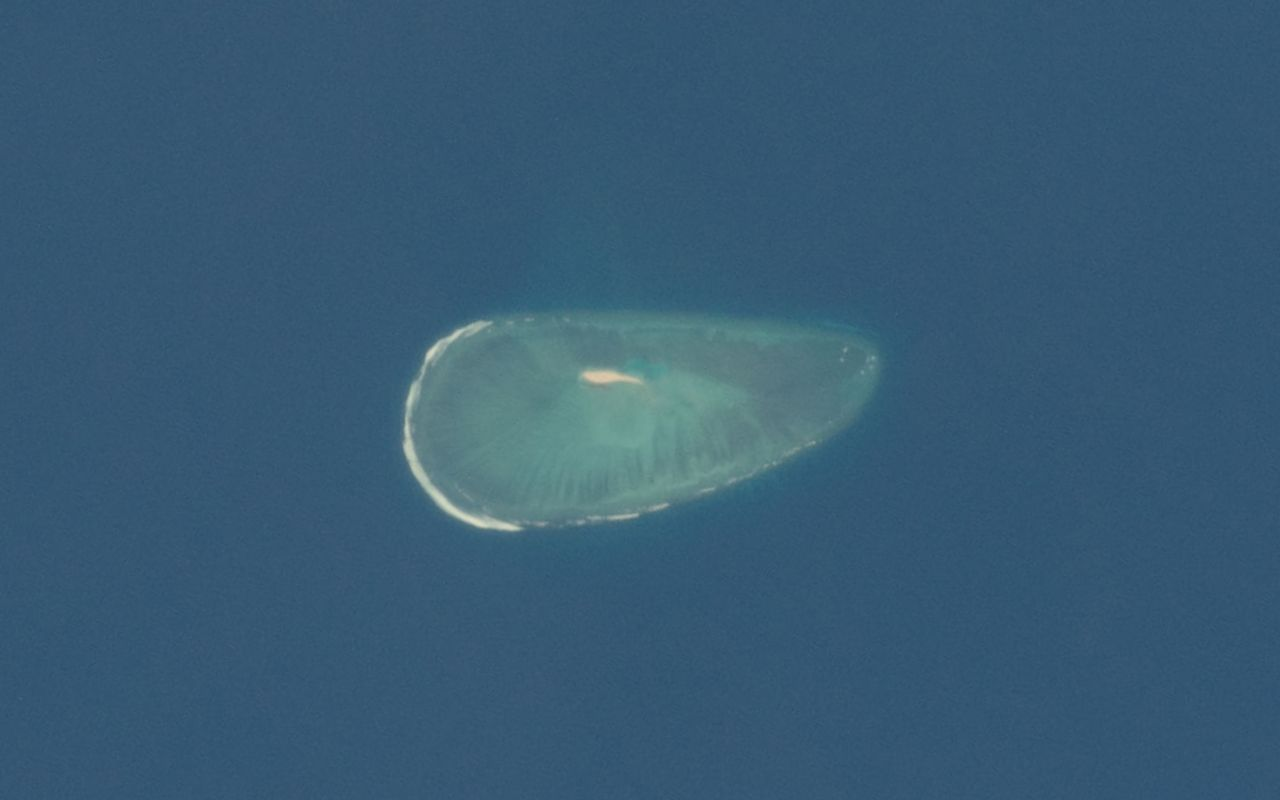
Cartier Island and surrounding reef (NASA satellite image

Cartier Island is an uninhabited and unvegetated sand cay in a platform reef in the Timor Sea, north of Australia and south of Indonesia. It is within the Territory of Ashmore and Cartier Islands, an external territory of Australia. The land area of Cartier Island is about 0.4 hectares (1.0 acre). It is located at 12°31′S 123°33′E, on the edge of the Sahul Shelf, about 300 kilometres (190 mi) off the north west coast of Western Australia, 200 kilometres (120 mi) south of the Indonesian island of Roti, and 70 kilometres (43 mi) south-east of Ashmore Reef.

At the southern edge of the reef is a shipwreck of the Ann Millicent, an iron-hulled barge of 944 tons wrecked in 1888. The remains of an RAAF Beaufighter can also be seen at low tide. Formerly used as a bombing range, access to the island is prohibited because of the risk of unexploded ordnance. The area is still a gazetted Defence Practice Area, but is no longer in active use.

Cartier Island is completely unvegetated except for the seagrass Thalassia hemprichii, which grows in pockets of sand within the reef, and may be exposed at low tide.

== History ==
The island was charted in 1800 and named after the ship Cartier. Its charted position was somewhat inaccurate until corrected in 1878 during a hydrographic survey by Lieutenant William Tooker in the Airlie. On 5 January 1888 the Ann Millicent was wrecked on the island during a voyage from the Gulf of Carpentaria to Adelaide, South Australia. In 1909 it was annexed by the United Kingdom, but on 23 July 1931 both Ashmore Reef and Cartier Island were transferred to Australia.

During World War II the area was used as a bombing range. Cartier Island and the surrounding marine area within a 10 kilometres (6.2 mi) radius was a gazetted Defence Practice Area up to 20 July 2011 and has been used in the past as an air weapons range. Although the site is no longer an active weapons range there is a substantial risk that unexploded ordnance remains in the area.

Cartier Island is within an area subject to a Memorandum of Understanding (known as the MOU Box) signed by Australia and Indonesia in 1974 and reviewed in 1989, which provided for continued Indonesian traditional fishing within limits.

=== Discovery of human remains and coronial inquest ===
On 28 March 2000, the crew of the HMAS Geraldton discovered a gravesite indicative of a recent interment on Cartier Island. Enquiries made of nearby fishermen, whose vessels were moored in the area, revealed that the death and burial had occurred less than one week prior. Due to Australia being the governing authority of the Ashmore and Cartier Islands, the matter was subsequently reported to the Australian Customs Service.

A forensic delegation, led by the Northern Territory Police Force, visited Cartier Island on 1 April 2000 to investigate further. As the identity of the deceased could not be confirmed – and the circumstances of the man's death remained unclear – the body was formally exhumed and transferred to Darwin, where an autopsy was performed and a coronial inquest conducted.

Despite extensive efforts, including coordination with the Indonesian authorities, the "Cartier man" was never conclusively identified. The coroner found the decedent:

- had died at sea, of an undetermined cause (not necessarily by drowning, as Indonesian fishermen had stated); and
- was an Asian male aged between 25 and 35 years upon his death, c. 22–24 March 2000.

Whilst the coroner recommended the Cartier man's remains be reinterred, there is no evidence to suggest this ultimately occurred.

== Environment and protection ==
The Cartier Island Marine Park covers an area within 4 nautical miles (7 km) of the centre of the reef which is protected as a Sanctuary Zone (IUCN Ia).

In 2003, environmental authorities closed maritime access to the island and its surrounding reef to build up depleted fish stocks and for safety reasons. Announced as a seven-year closure, Environment Australia planned to monitor levels of marine wildlife, and determine the presence of unexploded ordnance. Before then, the area was frequented by yachts, and fished by Indonesian boats.

== Sources ==
- Cartier Island at the Gazetteer of Australia online
- Ashmore and Cartier Islands at CIA - The World Factbook
