= SIEV 36 =

SIEV 36 (Suspected Illegal Entry Vessel 36) was a vessel from Indonesia that exploded and sank off Ashmore Reef, Australia on 16 April 2009. The vessel, carrying 47 refugees and two crew, was intercepted by the Royal Australian Navy patrol boat HMAS Albany early on 15 April. A boarding party secured the vessel, but failed to locate two canisters of petrol. Although it was intended to take the crew and passengers to Christmas Island for processing, a notice informing the crew that their vessel may be returned to Indonesia was presented, and the passengers were kept in the dark about their destination. While waiting for transportation to arrive, Albany and SIEV 36 sailed in a holding pattern, with the Indonesian boat taken in tow overnight. A second patrol boat, HMAS Childers, arrived that evening, and was directed to provide a boarding party and take care of the vessel starting at 06:00 on 16 April.

Childers' boarding party arrived aboard SIEV 36 at 06:15. Shortly after, the passengers found the notice, and, assuming that they would be sent back to Indonesia, became agitated. Salt was poured into the boat's diesel engine, stalling it, and one of the petrol canisters was spread on the deck. Reinforcements were sent from Childers to restore control, and boarded shortly before the petrol was ignited; the resulting explosion tore the boat apart. RHIBs from the two patrol boats focused on recovering the nine Australian Defence Force personnel first, then began recovering others. Five passengers were killed, and many of the survivors were heavily burned; the two patrol boats sailed to the tanker Front Puffin, from where the wounded were heli-lifted to hospitals ashore.

An investigation by the Northern Territory Police concluded in October 2009, finding that one or more of the refugees had spread and ignited the petrol, but charges could not be laid as there was no enough evidence to identify the individuals responsible. A separate investigation by the Northern Territory Coroner criticised the RAN for not finding the petrol canisters, failing to confiscate ignition sources, and the lack of information provided about the refugee's destination, although praised the actions of several Australian personnel in the aftermath of the explosion. The coroner found the crew as the cause of the sabotaged engine and the passengers as starting the fire, but was unable to identify individuals because of collusion by those involved to hide the information from the inquiry. Commendations were issued to all military personnel involved in the incident. One refugee was charged with obstructing the actions of two sailors trying to confiscate a lighter from him shortly before the explosion, and the two Indonesian crew were imprisoned for five years on people-smuggling charges.

== Events ==
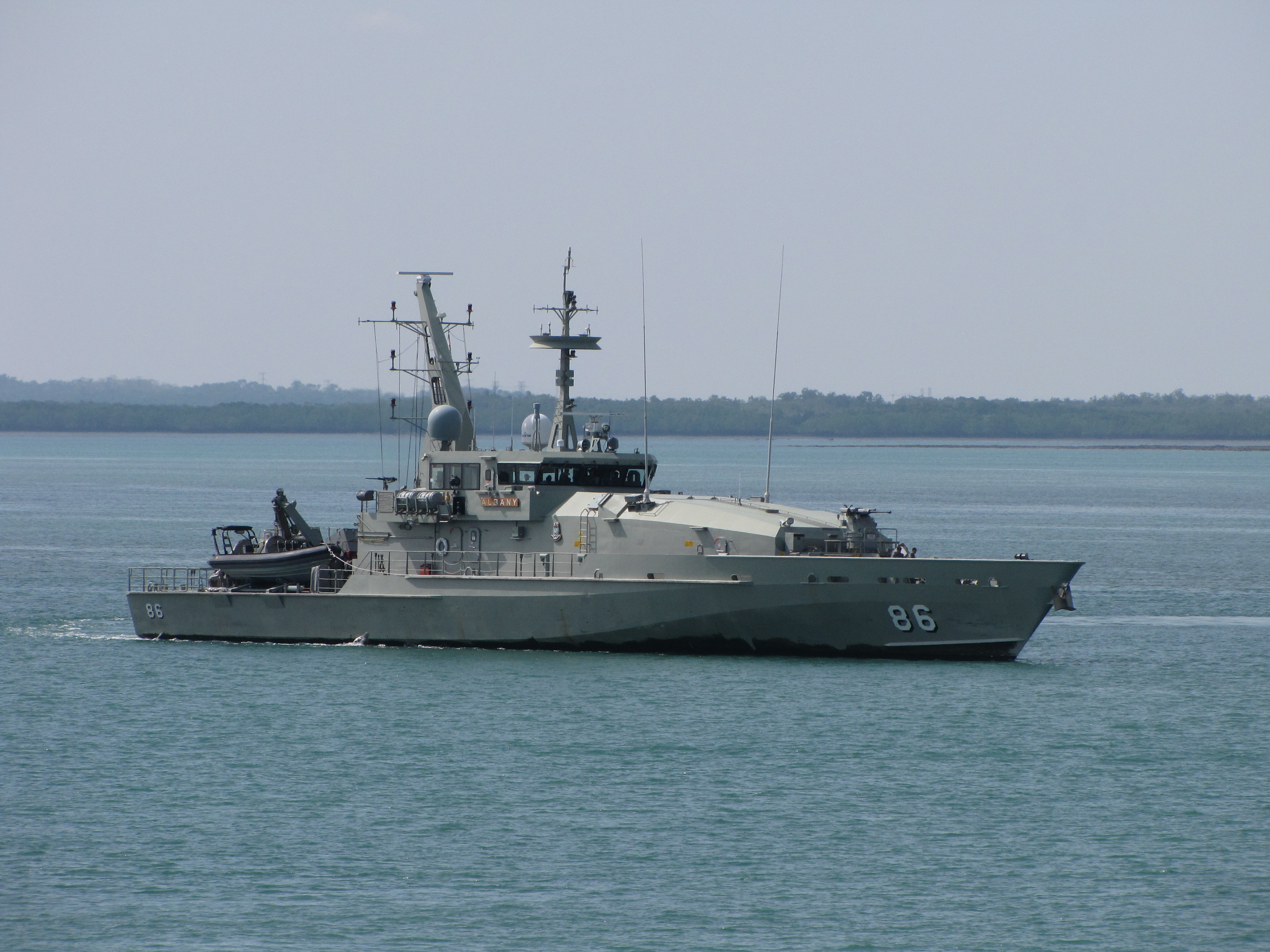
HMAS Albany, one of the patrol boats involved in the SIEV 36 incident

=== Leadup ===
Early on 15 April, the RAN patrol boat HMAS Albany intercepted the 25-metre (82 ft) diesel-powered fishing boat off Ashmore Reef. A boarding party was sent at 09:43, and boarded the vessel, designated "Suspected Illegal Entry Vessel 36" (the 36th vessel to enter Australian waters while carrying asylum seekers or other unauthorised arrivals since the 2001 Tampa Affair), without incident. The boat was carrying 46 Afghans, an Iraqi, and two Indonesian crew: all male adults. One of the passengers was able to serve as an interpreter, and spent the day helping the Australians by translating instructions and directions, and explaining the actions of the navy boarders. Although sabotage was a risk with SIEVs (in previous incidents, unauthorised arrivals had damaged their vessels or threatened to do so in an attempt to force authorities to take them to Australia), the passengers were allowed to keep cigarette lighters and matches, as removing peoples' ability to smoke would cause unnecessary agitation. The boarding party searched the vessel, but failed to identify a petrol-fuelled bilge pump and its fuel can, or a spare petrol canister in the bow hold.

The leader of the boarding party gave one of the Indonesian crew a K-6-4 notice, a mandatory notice stating the penalties for people smuggling, and which included text advising the crew to "consider immediately returning to Indonesia with your passengers". Although the passengers were to be taken to Christmas Island for processing, standard procedure was to only tell them that they would be taken to "Australian authorities". Albany's commander was advised that the amphibious warfare ship HMAS Tobruk would arrive to collect those aboard SIEV 36 in about three days; anchoring the two vessels in Ashmore Lagoon or using the patrol boat to deliver them to Christmas Island were both ruled out, so a steaming party was embarked and the two vessels began sailing in a holding pattern. That evening, SIEV 36 was taken in tow by Albany, in order to provide better surveillance and support during the night. Around the same time, HMAS Childers arrived to provide support: the two captains agreed that Childers would spend the night on anti-fishing patrols, then return around 06:00 to relieve Albany on close surveillance of SIEV 36.

The handover occurred on schedule, although officers aboard Childers were concerned that this was occurring almost two hours before sunrise. The replacement boarding party reached SIEV 36 at 06:15, and by 07:10, the towline to Albany had been dropped, and the vessel was following Childers under its own power. Although the leader of the new boarding party had been informed that there was an interpreter aboard, he did not use the man to relay directions or explain actions.

=== Explosion ===
Shortly after the Childers boarding party arrived, the interpreter found the K-6-4 notice and told the others that this meant they would be forced back to Indonesia. The situation quickly deteriorated, with passengers shouting abuse at the Indonesian crew and the Australian steaming party. The military personnel aboard began indicating that SIEV 36 would be heading to Christmas Island, not Indonesia, but a few minutes later, the boat's engine stopped.

As the engine died the head of the boarding party began to smell petrol, and at 07:29, he radioed Childers for assistance. Shortly after the engine stopped, one of the passengers took the petrol canister from the forward hold and spread its contents over the deck. Another passenger began waving a cigarette lighter around, and two Australians grabbed him. A reinforcement boarding party arrived from Childers at 07:44, bringing the number of Australian personnel aboard SIEV 36 to nine.

=== Rescue ===
Shortly after the explosion, Childers began dropping life rafts and flotation devices into the water, and lowered nets to assist anyone climbing aboard. However, most of the passengers were unable to swim the short distance to the floats or the patrol boat, and stayed on the burning wreck until one of the Australians began urging them into the water.

In the water, the RHIBs' priority were the Australian military personnel, to the point where while trying to pull a Royal Australian Air Force medic from the water, a member of the boat crew kicked at an Afghan man to stop him from preventing her rescue. By 07:58, all nine personnel had been recovered. Both Indonesian crew were rescued, along with 42 of the passengers. Three bodies were recovered, with another two never found.

At 09:58, Childers left the scene to transport the worst-burned survivors to Darwin. Shortly after, the ship was told to divert to Front Puffin, a tanker permanently moored in the Timor Sea as a gas processing platform, where helicopters would relay the wounded to hospitals ashore: cutting a 25-hour voyage down to 4 hours. The patrol boat reached Front Puffin at 14:14, with the first burn victims lifted aboard the tanker about 20 minutes later, a helicopter bearing eight doctors arriving around sunset. Albany, which had remained at the explosion site for another hour before departing, arrived later.

== Aftermath ==
The 42 surviving passengers were all found to be legitimate asylum seekers, and granted permanent protection visas in October 2009.

On 6 May 2009, the Commander Joint Operations, Lieutenant General Mark Evans, AO, DSC, appointed Brigadier Don Higgins, AM, as an Inquiry Officer, pursuant to the provisions of the Defence (Inquiry) Regulations 1985, to inquire into the circumstances surrounding the arrival, apprehension and boarding of SIEV 36, and the response of ADF personnel to the explosion in SIEV 36 (but not the cause or circumstances of the explosion itself). Brigadier Higgins was assisted by two Assistant Inquiry Officers, Commander Bob Heffey, CSM, RAN, the then Commanding Officer, HMAS CAIRNS, who had significant patrol boat experience, and Lieutenant Commander Paul W. Kerr, RANR, a Navy legal officer with significant inquiry experience. Brigadier Higgins' Report contained nine Findings and 59 Recommendations, including recommendations for recognition of particular personnel. The Report concluded:

The rapid response by ADF personnel to the mass SOLAS situation caused by an explosion and fire onboard SIEV 36 also demonstrated compassion and concern for the sanctity of human life. That there was not a greater loss of life is a direct consequence of this skilful, determined and compassionate response b the ADF personnel at the scent, in particular the ASSAIL TWO and ARDENT FOUR crews, and their attached personnel.

Northern Territory Police investigation concluded in October 2009. They concluded that one or more of the passengers spread petrol and ignited it, causing the explosion. Charges could not be laid because there was not enough evidence to identify individuals, with the possibility that the perpetrator(s) were among those killed, or alternately, those who knew the truth were concealing it. The two Indonesian crew were sentenced to five years imprisonment on people-smuggling charges, while the passenger who fought with the Australians trying to confiscate his lighter was charged with obstructing the sailors' actions.

Most of the passengers denied or made claims of forgetfulness about what they had told the police shortly after the incident, hampering the efforts of the following inquiry. The Northern Territory Coroner concluded that the Australian personnel failed in their duties on several counts, by not finding and securing the petrol canisters, not confiscating ignition sources, and not informing the passengers of their intended destination. He believed that the K-6-4 notice was inflammatory, and its presentation was inappropriate in the situation (despite it being mandated for all SIEVs). The inquiry found that those aboard the SIEV had planned to incapacitate the boat: the crew by pouring salt into the diesel engine, and the passengers by spreading and igniting petrol, but the coroner was unable to identify individuals responsible for the petrol ignition because the passengers "colluded with each other and decided as a group to lie to this Inquest". The coroner recommended that three of the Australian personnel be recognised for their actions during the explosion's aftermath and the voyage to Front Puffin; the Australian Defence Force took it a step further, with six personnel awarded individual commendations, and both ships' companies receiving group commendations.

== Citations ==
REPORT. ADF ...at the scene ...
