= ACV Ashmore Guardian =

Patrol vessel of Australia, then PNG

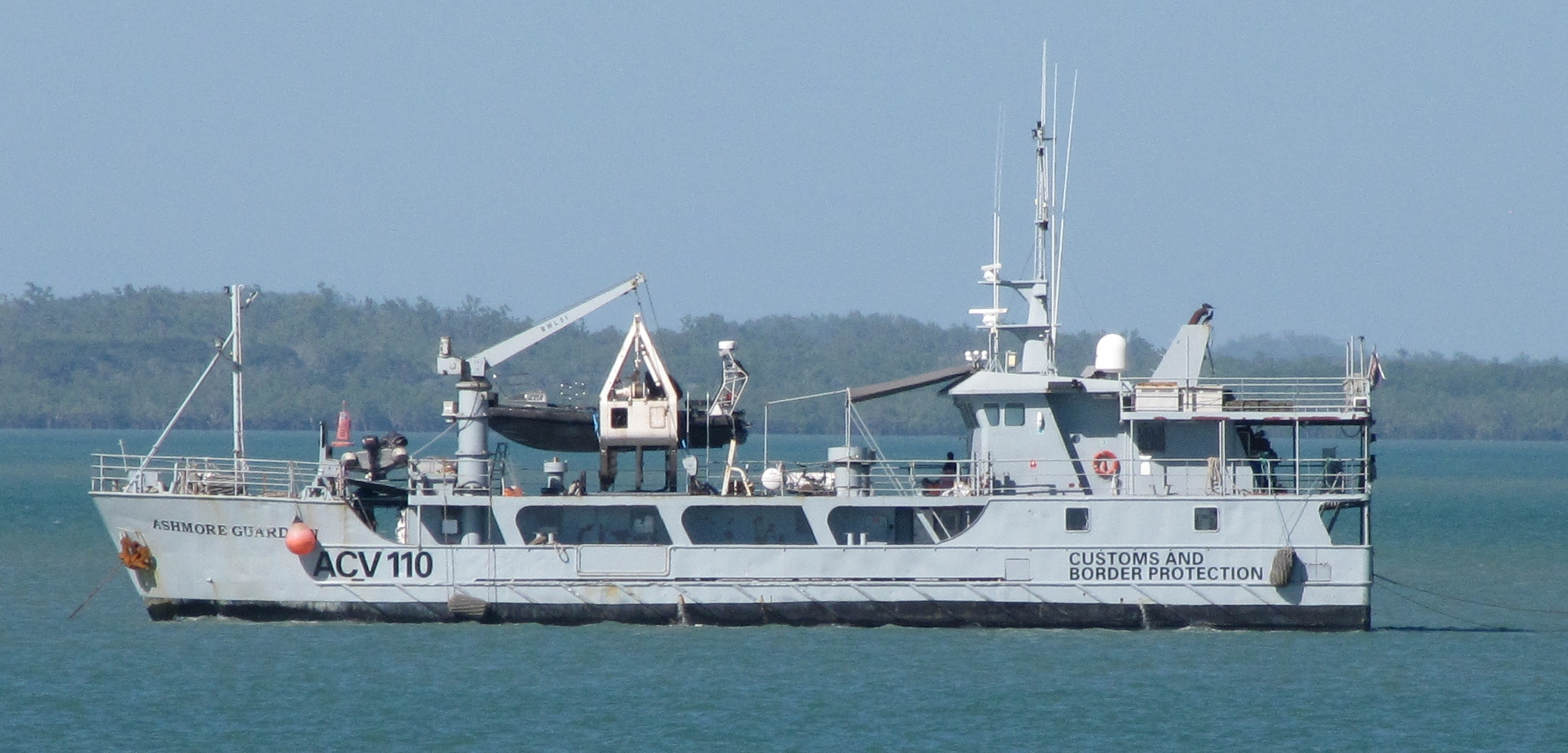
- ACV Ashmore Guardian in Darwin, May 2011

History

Australia
- Name: Ashmore Guardian
- Owner: Gardline Australia Pty Ltd
- Operator: Australian Customs and Border Protection Service
- Builder: K Shipyard, Fremantle, Western Australia
- Launched: 1983
- Acquired: March 2008
- Home port: Darwin
- Identification: MMSI number: 503562000; IMO number: 8215285; Call sign: VNW6069

Papua New Guinea
- Name: Niugini Guardian
- Acquired: 2015
- In service: 2015-current
- Identification: IMO number: 4906551; MMSI number: 503562000; Callsign: VNW6069

General characteristics
- Tonnage: 339 GT
- Length: 34.9 m (114 ft 6 in)
- Beam: 8 m (26 ft 3 in)
- Draught: 3 m (9 ft 10 in)
- Propulsion: 2 × Caterpillar 3406E marine diesel engines, 336 kW (451 hp)
- Speed: 10 knots (19 km/h; 12 mph)
- Boats & landing craft carried: 2 × 7.3 m (24 ft) rigid hull inflatable boats
- Complement: 6 crew and up to 10 customs officers.
- Notes: Contains a "secure holding facility for up to ten apprehended illegal foreign fishers".

Niugini Guardian is a patrol vessel operated by Papua New Guinea and previously operated as the ACV Ashmore Guardian by the Customs Marine Unit of the Australian Customs and Border Protection Service. The former fishing supply vessel Roper K was converted in 2007-08 by Jurong SML in Singapore. It was leased to Customs, primarily to patrol the Ashmore and Cartier Islands for up to 330 days per year.
