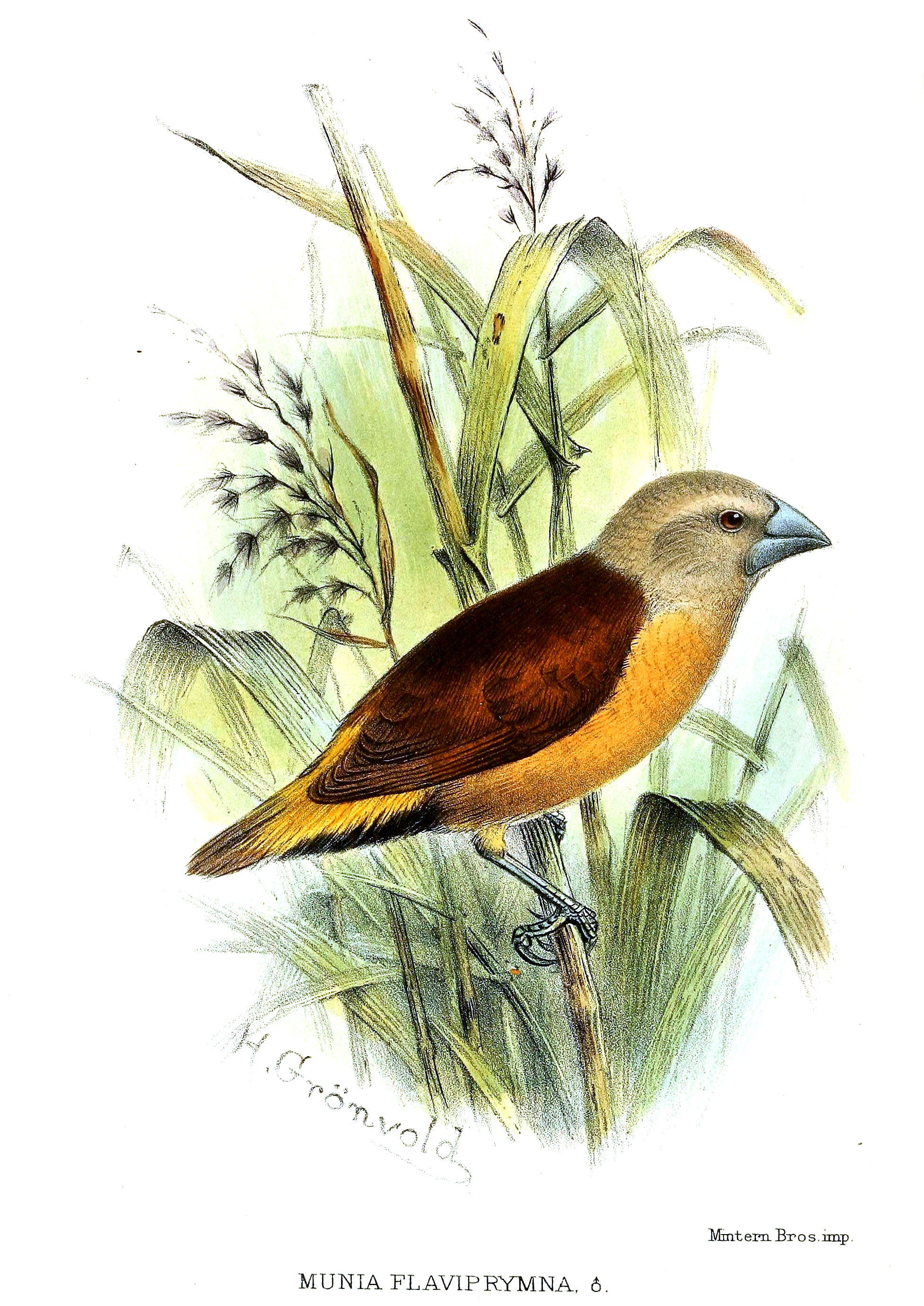

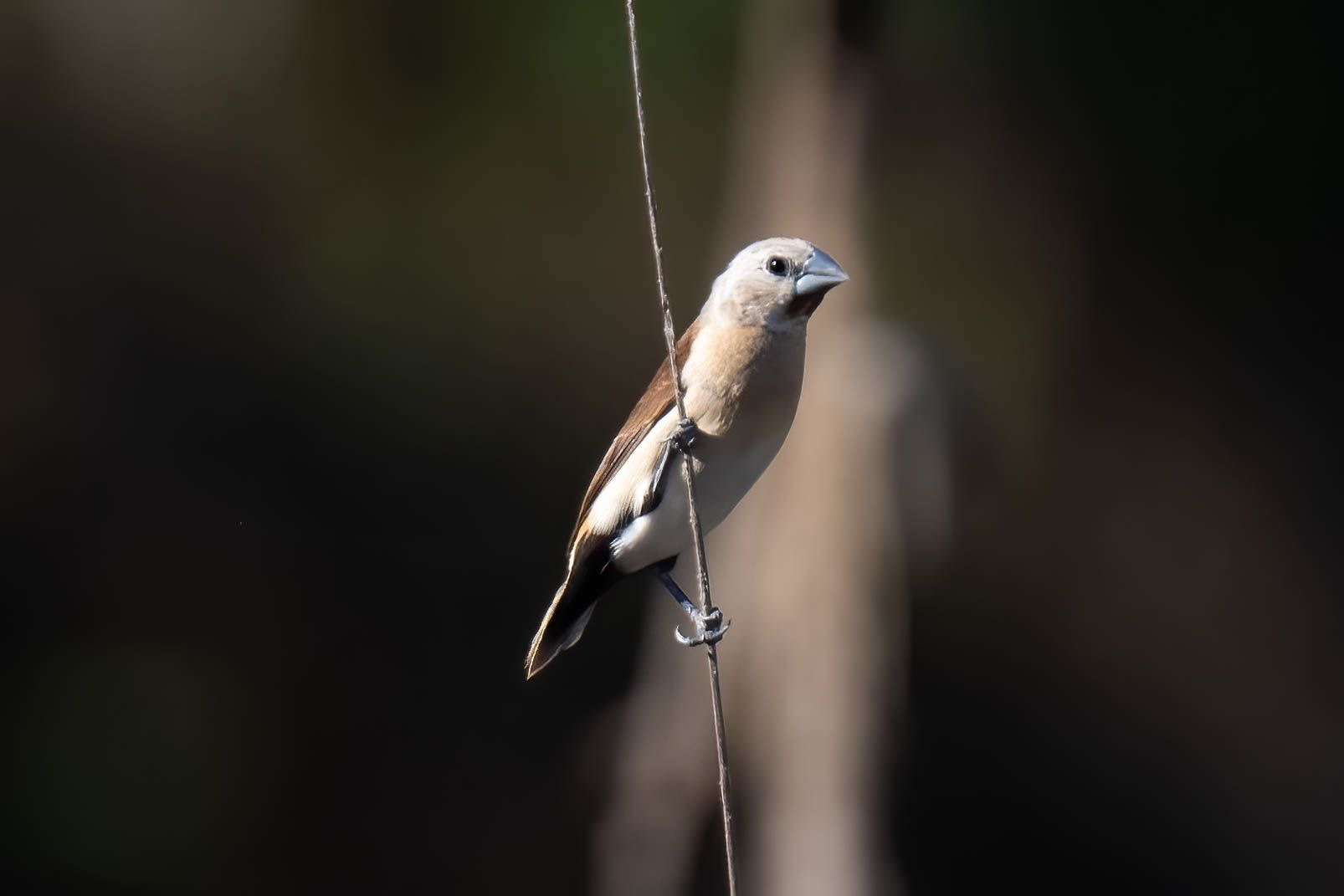

Conservation status
- Least Concern (IUCN 3.1)

Scientific classification
- Kingdom: Animalia
- Phylum: Chordata
- Class: Aves
- Order: Passeriformes
- Family: Estrildidae
- Genus: Lonchura
- Species: L. flaviprymna

Binomial name
- Lonchura flaviprymna (Gould, 1845)

= Yellow-rumped mannikin =

Species of bird

The yellow-rumped mannikin (Lonchura flaviprymna) also known as the yellow-rumped munia, is a species of estrildid finch found in the eastern Kimberley region and north-west Northern Territory, Australia. It has an estimated global extent of occurrence of 20,000 to 50,000 km^{2}. It is found in subtropical to tropical mangrove, moist savanna and wetland habitats. The conservation status of the species is evaluated as being of Least Concern.

== Taxonomy ==
The yellow-rumped mannikin was first described by the English ornithologist John Gould in 1845 as Donacola flaviprymna. The original specimen was collected by Benjamin Bynoe, surgeon aboard HMS Beagle, on the banks of the Victoria River in the Northern Territory. Gould considered it closely related to the chestnut-breasted mannikin (Lonchura castaneothorax), but sufficiently distinct to warrant recognition as a separate species. The bird is now placed in the genus Lonchura within the family Estrildidae, and is regarded as monotypic, with no recognised subspecies. Molecular and morphological studies place it near other pale-headed or yellow-rumped forms within the genus.

== Etymology ==
The genus name Lonchura is derived from Greek words referring to a lance or spear and a tail. Flaviprymna, the name assigned by Gould in the original description, derives from Latin flavus (“yellow”) and Greek prymnos (referring to the rump).

== Description ==
The yellow-rumped mannikin is a small finch measuring approximately 12 cm in length. Adults have a pale fawn or whitish-grey head and neck, chestnut-brown upper parts, buff-coloured underparts and a distinctive yellow to ochre-coloured rump and upper tail-coverts. The under tail coverts are black. The bill is bluish-grey and the eyes are dark brown.

The sexes are similar in appearance, with any differences in plumage relatively subtle. Females have sometimes been described as having slightly paler underparts and a greyer, less silvery crown, although these differences are not considered reliable for field identification.

Juveniles are generally browner and duller than adults, with a brown or light-brown head and a less developed yellow rump. Their bill is dark grey rather than the pale blue-grey of adults. The post-juvenile moult into adult plumage is completed within approximately five months of fledging.

Recorded measurements include a male wing length of 52-to-57 mm, tail length of 32-to-37 mm and bill length of 12.2-to-13.6 mm. Adult weights range from approximately 10-to-13g.

=== Similar species ===
The yellow-rumped mannikin may be confused with some other members of the genus Lonchura, including the chestnut-breasted mannikin, with which it commonly flocks and shares much of the same range and habitat. The yellow-rumped species is distinguished by its pale head, buff underparts and conspicuous yellow rump, while the chestnut-breasted mannikin has a notably very dark face, a strongly contrasting chestnut breast and belly, and a white lower belly.

The pale-headed munia, (Lonchura pallida), a species from Indonesia's Lesser Sunda islands and Timor Leste, has increasingly been appearing as a vagrant in north-western Australia since the 2020s, and in some ways closely resembles the yellow-rumped mannikin. While both have pale heads, brown upper parts and pale underparts, the Australian species has a diagnostically yellow rump and upper tail-coverts, which contrast with its darker brown back. The pale-headed munia has brownish upper parts and a rump that is much less contrasting than its local counterpart.

== Distribution and habitat ==
The species is endemic to northern Australia. Its principal range includes the eastern Kimberley region of Western Australia and adjoining areas of the north-western Northern Territory.

In Western Australia, historical records place the species in the northeastern Kimberley lowlands, particularly around the Pentecost River, Parry Creek and the lower Ord River, extending upstream towards Kununurra.

In the Northern Territory, the species occurs in the Victoria River region and adjoining areas; where the original specimen described by Gould was collected.

Its preferred habitats include long grass around swamps, wetlands and watercourses, reed beds and grasslands. It has also been recorded in cultivated environments, including rice fields. The species is associated with tropical and subtropical wetlands, savanna and mangroves.

In urban Darwin, it is rarely seen alone and usually appears among larger flocks of chestnut-breasted mannikins, with big flocks of the yellow-rumped usually only seen further inland.

It is non-migratory, though locally dispersive in response to seed availability and wet-season conditions.

== Behaviour and ecology ==
Typically of many munia species, the yellow-rumped mannikin is highly sociable, usually occurring in pairs or small parties, although larger flocks have also been recorded. It frequently associates with the chestnut-breasted mannikin in areas where their ranges overlap.

It is described as nomadic, with movements towards coastal areas during the dry season. These movements are thought to reflect seasonal changes in the availability of food and suitable wetland habitat.

=== Diet ===
The species is primarily granivorous, feeding on the seeds of grasses and other plants, although some insects are taken, especially when breeding and feeding chicks. Its preference for long grass and wetland vegetation provides access to a range of native grass seeds. It also makes use of cultivated food sources.

=== Breeding ===
Observations in the Kimberley indicate that breeding occurs principally between February and April.

The species builds domed or globular nests from grass and other plant material, generally concealed in dense vegetation. Clutch sizes of approximately four to six eggs are standard. Both sexes participate in incubation.

=== Vocalisations and displays ===
The species produces contact calls and other short vocalisations used in maintaining contact between members of a flock. Males produce a gentle tinkling or more animated song during courtship. Calls are similar to those of the chestnut-breasted mannikin but sometimes described as slightly louder.

The birds sometimes engage in peering behaviour, where groups will closely cluster, seemingly entranced by physical and vocal cues from a lead individual. During its display, the cock bird stands upright with belly and crown feathers raised and the bill wide open, producing clucking and creaking sounds.

== Hybridisation with the chestnut-breasted mannikin ==
The yellow-rumped mannikin has a particularly notable relationship with the chestnut-breasted mannikin, with which it occurs sympatrically across parts of northern Australia. The two species are closely related and are known to commonly hybridise both in captivity and in the wild.

=== Historical reports ===
The purportedly relatively recent expansion of the chestnut-breasted mannikin into the northeastern Kimberley may have brought the two species into more frequent contact. According to G.M. Storr's 1980 account of the birds of the Kimberley, the chestnut-breasted mannikin became established in the northeastern lowlands sometime between 1910 and 1960, having previously been absent from that area.

Storr described the yellow-rumped mannikin as having become scarce in the northeastern flatlands and suggested that it was apparently being supplanted by the recently established chestnut-breasted mannikin. He also noted that the two species usually occurred together and that they commonly interbred.

Eugene McCarthy reported that interbreeding occurred in the Ord and Victoria River valleys and described a substantial hybrid population in northern Australia. Ornithologist E. Slater, who had worked at the Kimberley Research Station, reported that the two species commonly interbred. He further observed that nearly all yellow-rumped mannikins in the population he studied showed some characteristics of chestnut-breasted mannikin plumage.

McCarthy also recorded that young hybrids could closely resemble yellow-rumped mannikins, with more conspicuous chestnut-breasted markings developing as the birds aged. Avicultural observations suggest that these markings can become more apparent at around three years of age.

=== Extent and nature of hybridisation ===
Some historical accounts suggested that hybridisation was not restricted to occasional pairings, but occurred in very substantial numbers, across a wide area of geographical overlap. Such reports of widespread mixed-species nesting associations and intermediate plumage indicated a potential hybrid swarm population forming in northern Australia.

The possibility that widespread hybridisation and competition with the chestnut-breasted mannikin could threaten the yellow-rumped mannikin has been raised in conservation assessments. However, recent observations note that the yellow-rumped remains common in agricultural areas around places like Kununurra, with little evidence of surging intermediate forms or population-level impacts of hybridisation in these large contemporary flocks.

Field observations confirm ongoing hybridisation into recent decades, with mixed pairs and intermediate individuals regularly recorded.

== Conservation status ==
The yellow-rumped mannikin is classified as Least Concern on the IUCN Red List.

Although its geographical distribution is relatively restricted compared with many other Australian finches, it remains established across parts of the eastern Kimberley and north-western Northern Territory. Its occurrence in agricultural landscapes around Kununurra suggests that it can persist in some modified habitats.

The potential impact on the species of the purported expansion of the chestnut-breasted mannikin remains unsettled and a source of some controversy.

== In captivity ==
The species is kept in captivity in Australia and internationally. While relatively uncommon, it is considered easy to breed and to care for using standard munia husbandry techniques. It is reputedly peaceful and charismatic, and is seen as a suitable addition to a mixed species finch aviary. Like many Lonchura finches, it is regarded as a high risk species for unwanted hybridisation with other members of its genus, which should either be kept separately or very closely managed.

Legal trapping of the species ended in 1976, well ahead of a general ban on trapping of all finches in the Kimberley in 1986, due to the species' perceived vulnerability.

With its relatively muted colouring compared to many other commonly bred finches, the species is not consistently popular among Australian breeders. Its availability sometimes sharply declines due to a perceived lack of market demand, before its resulting rarity then creates a cyclical spike in price or demand among breeders.

== See also ==
- Estrildidae – the family to which the yellow-rumped mannikin belongs
- Lonchura – the genus of munias
- Chestnut-breasted mannikin – closely related Australian munia, with which it regularly hybridises
- Pale-headed munia – visually similar Southeast Asian species now sometimes seen in northern Australia
- Pictorella mannikin – another native Australian munia
- Scaly-breasted munia – a related Asian species widely feral in eastern Australia
- Hybrid swarm – a population of hybrids that has survived beyond the initial hybrid generation
