= Browse Island =

Island in Western Australia

Browse
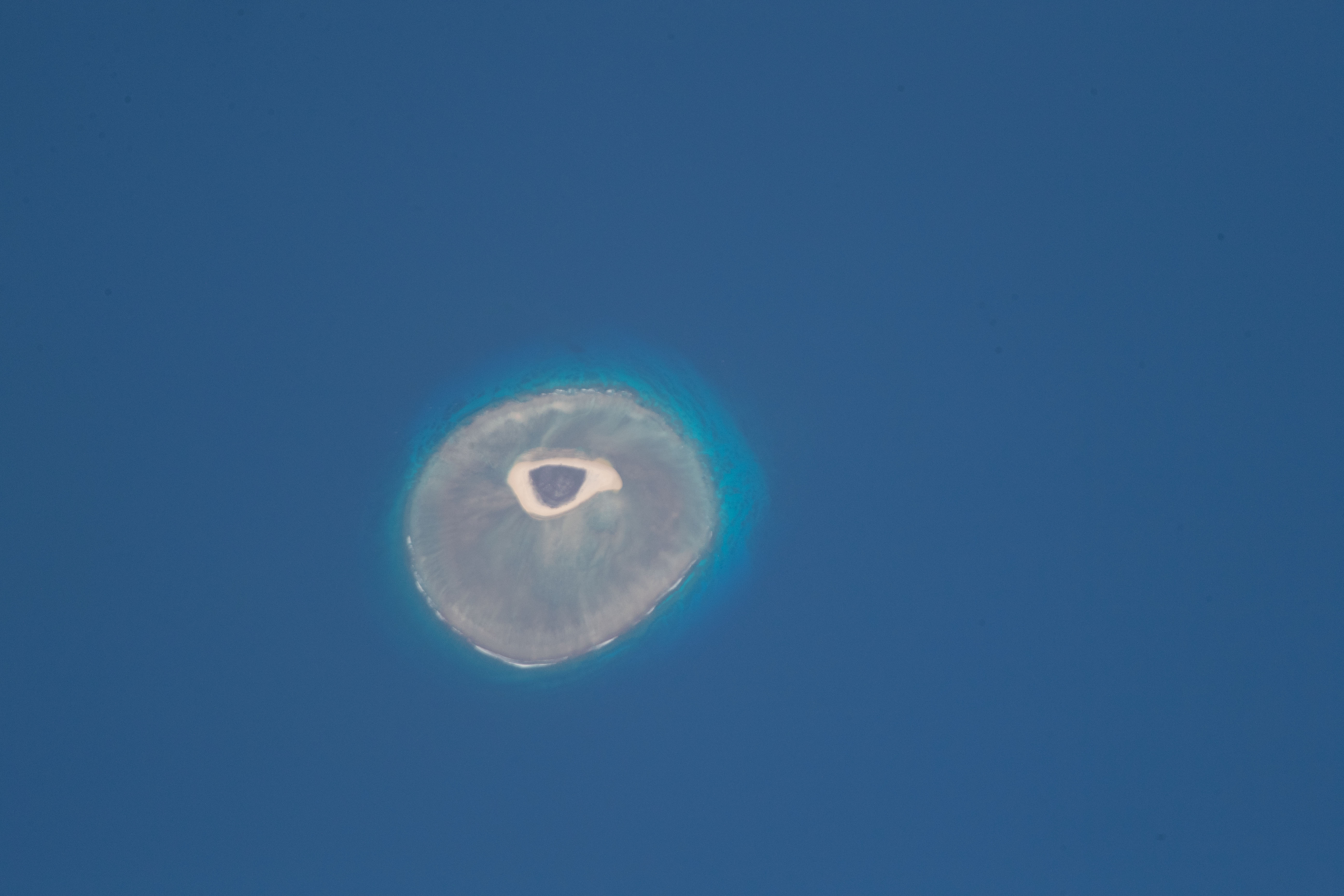
- Satellite image of Browse Island taken in 2011 by ISS Expedition 29

- Location within Western Australia

Geography
- Location: Timor Sea
- Coordinates: 14°06′32″S 123°32′57″E

Administration
- Australia

Demographics
- Population: 0

Browse Island is a small, approximately 14-hectare (35-acre), uninhabited island lying in the Timor Sea about 180 km (110 mi) north-west of the Kimberley coast of north-western Australia. It is a Western Australian Nature Reserve that is classed as 'Not Class A' (Note: Also listed as 'Class C', an outdated classification.) vested with the state Conservation Commission and managed by the Department of Environment and Conservation. It is considered Western Australia's most remote island, and is also one of the most remote Australian islands to not fall under external territory status.

== Environment ==
=== Fauna ===
The island is an important nesting site for green turtles as well as seabirds. Introduced house mice were present in large numbers until an eradication attempt with drone-dispersed baits in 2026. After six months, eradication appeared successful. The Parks and Wildlife Service will revisit the island after an additional six months to reassess the result.

The island is surrounded by extensive coral reefs. The waters around the island are a site of upwelling associated with concentrations of tropical krill, and there have been unconfirmed reports of humpback whales feeding there.

=== Human impact ===
The island was mined for guano from 1870 to 1890. There are nine historic shipwrecks around the island, including one which is listed on the Register of the National Estate. There is a helipad which is used by the oil and gas industry. The surrounding waters are visited by Indonesian fishers, as the island lies in the MOU 74 Box area allowing traditional Indonesian fishing activities within the Australian Fishing Zone.

It is rumoured the island was used during World War 2 by the American Navy.

An acetylene-powered lighthouse was constructed on the southern end of the island in 1945; it was converted to solar power in 1985.

The liquid natural gas production platform Ichthys Explorer is located near the island. It is the world's largest semi-submersible platform.
