= East Island (Ashmore and Cartier Islands) =

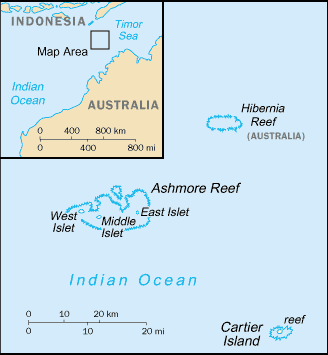
A map of Ashmore and Cartier Islands from The World Factbook, with East Island marked as "East Islet".

East Island is one of three islets of Ashmore Reef, which is a part of Ashmore and Cartier Islands. It is located at 12°15′S 123°05′E, about midway between Australia and Timor. It is often referred to as East Islet, a name that is used, for example, in The World Factbook; the islet's gazetted name is, however, East Island.

It has an area of around 25,000 square metres (270,000 sq ft). Like the other islands on the reef, it is unpopulated. Politically it is part of Ashmore and Cartier Islands, an external territory of Australia. Some Indonesian groups dispute Australia's claim to these islands, however.
