= Cartier Island Marine Park =

Protected marine park in Australia

- IUCN category Ia (strict nature reserve)
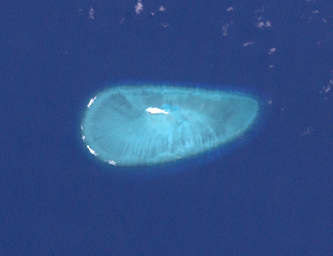
- Cartier Island from Landsat 7 on 8 September 1999
- Map showing the Cartier Island Marine Park. The area is a Sanctuary Zone ('no take' zone).
- Location: Australia
- Coordinates: 12.5308°S 123.5552°E
- Area: 172 km^{2} (66 sq mi)
- Established: 21 June 2000
- Operator: Parks Australia
- Website: parksaustralia.gov.au/marine/parks/north-west/cartier-island/

The Cartier Island Marine Park (previously known as the Cartier Island Marine Reserve) is an Australian marine park that covers the Cartier Island and reef surrounds, about 610 km (380 mi) north of Broome, Western Australia. The marine park covers an area of 172 km^{2} (66 sq mi) and is assigned IUCN category Ia (Sanctuary Zone). It is one of the 13 parks managed under the North-west Marine Parks Network.

While access has been restricted to the marine park for environmental protective measures, there is also a risk of unexploded ordnance as the area has previously been used for defence practice.

== Conservation values ==
=== Species and habitat ===
- Internationally significant for its abundance and diversity of sea snakes.
- Significant feeding populations of green, hawksbill and loggerhead turtles occur around the reefs.
- Supports some of the most important seabird rookeries on the North West Shelf including colonies of bridled terns, common noddies, brown boobies, eastern reef egrets, frigatebirds, tropicbirds, red-footed boobies, roseate terns, crested terns and lesser crested terns.
- Important staging points/feeding areas for many migratory seabirds.

=== Bioregions and other features ===
- Covers the North West Shelf and Timor Province provincial bioregions.
- Emergent oceanic reefs.
- Ann Millicent historic shipwreck.

== History ==
The Marine Park was originally proclaimed under the National Parks and Wildlife Conservation Act 1975 on 21 June 2000 as the Cartier Island Marine Reserve, and proclaimed under the EPBC Act on 14 December 2013 and renamed Cartier Island Marine Park on 9 October 2017.

== Summary of protection zones ==
The Cartier Island Marine park has been assigned IUCN protected area category Ia and is wholly zoned as a Sanctuary Zone.

The following table is a summary of the zoning rules within the Cartier Island Marine Park:

Zone	IUCN	Activities permitted					
Zone	IUCN	Vessel transiting	Recreational fishing	Commercial fishing	Commercial aquaculture	Commercial tourism	Mining
Sanctuary Zone	Ia	No	No	No	No	aviation only, with approval	No
External link: Zoning and rules for the North-west Marine Parks Network

== See also ==
- Protected areas managed by the Australian government
