= Ashmore and Cartier Islands =

External territory of Australia

Territory of Ashmore and Cartier Islands
- Flag of Australia, used for the Ashmore and Cartier Islands

- Location of the Ashmore and Cartier Islands

Geography
- Location: Indian Ocean
- Coordinates: 12°15′30″S 123°02′30″E
- Total islands: 5
- Major islands: East Island, Cartier Island

Administration
- Australia

Demographics
- Population: 0

The Territory of Ashmore and Cartier Islands is an uninhabited external territory of Australia consisting of five low-lying islands in two separate reefs (Ashmore and Cartier), as well as the 12-nautical-mile (22 km; 14 mi) territorial sea generated by the islands. The territory is located in the Timor Sea on the edge of the Sahul Shelf, about 320 km (200 mi) off the northwest coast of Australia and 170 km (110 mi) south of the Indonesian island of Rote.

The Ashmore and Cartier Islands were discovered by Indonesian fishermen in the early 1700s and were regularly visited for the harvesting of sea cucumbers. Cartier Reef and Ashmore Reef were discovered by Europeans in around 1800 and 1811 respectively, and were mined for guano by American whalers in the late nineteenth century. Britain annexed Ashmore Reef in 1878 and extended its claim to include Cartier Reef in 1909, before transferring the territory to Australia in 1934. The islands were later visited by naval ships and were used as a weapons testing range. In 1983 the Ashmore Reef National Nature Reserve was established, and in 2000 this was followed by the Cartier Island Marine Reserve.

Under a 1974 memorandum of understanding, traditional Indonesian fishermen are permitted to access part of the Ashmore Islands and to fish in the surrounding waters. Australian authorities have regularly patrolled the reefs to combat illegal fishing and activities that fall outside of the scope of the agreement. Due to its proximity to Indonesia, the territory has also seen regular arrivals of asylum seekers seeking to claim refugee status in Australia. In 2001 the territory was excised from the Australian migration zone to prevent those arriving in the territory from claiming protection in Australia.

The territory is home to Ashmore Reef Marine Park and Cartier Island Marine Park. Each year about 100,000 seabirds breed on the Ashmore Islands, which is classified as an Important Bird Area. The reefs are also an important habitat for fish, sea cucumbers, turtles, and other species. Illegal fishing and introduced species, including fire ants and weeds, have been identified as threats to the islands' biodiversity.

== History ==
=== Early history ===
The Ashmore and Cartier Islands have been visited by Indonesian fishermen since the early 1700s. Ashmore Reef was discovered by Europeans in 1811 after Captain Samuel Ashmore sighted the islands aboard the ship Hibernia, while Cartier Reef and the neighbouring Hibernia Reef were discovered by Captain Nash in 1799 or 1800 (Note: Sources differ on the year.) aboard the ship Cartier. The area may also have been visited during this period by Dutch and Portuguese vessels.

Beginning in the mid-1800s, deposits of guano on the Ashmore Islands were mined by American whalers, but had run out by 1891. The islands were visited by HMS Barracouta in 1876, and two years later the government of the British colony of Western Australia chartered a ship and authorised its captain to lay claim to the islands. The annexation was initially repudiated by the Colonial Office as an overreach of the colonial government's authority, but in 1878 Britain took possession of the territory. At around the same time the islands were claimed on behalf of the Netherlands and the United States, but neither pressed their claims. In October 1878, the American whaling captain Amasa T. Webber claimed Ashmore Island for the United States under the Guano Islands Act and purported to rename it the Caller Group after his vessel, the Sadie F. Caller. The U.S. Department of State rejected his claim two months later. Webber subsequently formed the Melbourne Guano Company with a group of Australian investors and obtained a licence to exploit its guano reserves.

In 1906 HMS Cambrian reasserted possession of Ashmore Reef on behalf of the United Kingdom. The ship's commander, Captain Ernest Gaunt, went ashore accompanied by five officers and around 200 seamen, erecting the Union Jack on a flagpole and singing "God Save the King", while Cambrian returned a 21-gun salute. Britain extended its claim to include Cartier Island in 1909.

There were regular reports of illegal fishing in the islands in the early 20th century, which occurred alongside poaching on islands within the state boundaries of Western Australia. Beginning in 1919, the Western Australian state government made several appeals to the Australian federal government to target vessels from Koepang in the Dutch East Indies. In 1923 the Australian businessman Henry Hilliard petitioned the Department of External Affairs to grant him a fishing concession over Ashmore Reef and "complained of perahu from Java and Timor denuding the reef of its trepang, trochus and seabird populations". The Australian government's response to these issues was constrained by its lack of sovereignty over the islands.

=== Australian administration ===
In 1924 the Premier of Western Australia Philip Collier requested that the territory be brought under his state's jurisdiction to combat illegal fishing. James Henry Thomas, the British government's Secretary of State for the Colonies, proposed in the same year that Australia begin managing the issuance of fishing licenses for the Ashmore and Cartier Islands. Australian Prime Minister Stanley Bruce informed the Western Australian state government in February 1925 that Britain was prepared to transfer the territory to Australia, and the Western Australian premier responded that his state would be willing to administer the islands.

A British order-in-council dated 23 July 1931 stated that Ashmore and Cartier Islands would be placed under the authority of the Commonwealth of Australia once Australia passed legislation to accept them. The Commonwealth's resulting Ashmore and Cartier Islands Acceptance Act 1933 was passed on 15 December 1933, and on 10 May 1934 the islands formally became part of Australia. The act authorised the Governor of Western Australia to make ordinances for the territory. Due to a set of legal complications surrounding the administration of the islands by Western Australia, the state abandoned its attempts to take control of the islands in 1937, and the federal government designated the islands as part of the Northern Territory from 19 July 1938.

During the Second World War the islands were visited by naval ships, and in the following years the territory was used for weapons testing. Navigational lights and weather monitoring stations were installed on the islands during the 1950s and 1960s. The islands also continued to be regularly visited by Indonesian fishermen; a 1949 surveying visit reported that there were 23 prahu anchored at Ashmore Reef. A memorandum of understanding was signed with Indonesia in 1974 to allow traditional Indonesian fishermen access to parts of the territory. In 1978, when the Northern Territory was granted self-government, administration of the Ashmore and Cartier Islands was retained by the federal government. The Ashmore Reef National Nature Reserve was established in 1983, and was followed by the Cartier Island Marine Reserve in 2000. Cartier Island was used by the Australian Defence Force as a weapons range for training exercises until sometime before 1980, and an operation was conducted in 1986 to remove unexploded ordnance that had been left on the island.

== Geography and climate ==
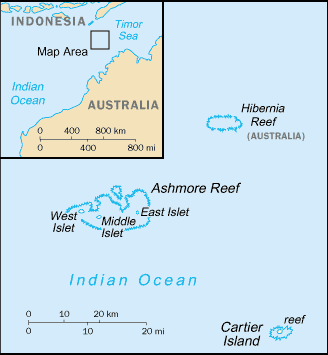
Map of Ashmore and Cartier Islands

The Ashmore and Cartier Islands are located in the Timor Sea to the north-west of the Australian mainland and sits on the edge of the Sahul Shelf. Ashmore Reef is called Pulau Pasir by Indonesians and Nusa Solokaek in the Rotenese language; both names have the meaning "sand island". The territory sits about 170 kilometres south of Rote Island, Indonesia, and 320 kilometres from the Australian mainland. It is surrounded by a territorial sea with a radius of 12 nautical miles. Ashmore Reef is an atoll approximately 26 kilometres (16 mi) in length and 26 kilometres (16 mi) in width, and contains four cays: West, Middle, and East Islands; and Splittgerber Cay. The islands have a combined land area of approximately 1.12 square kilometres (0.43 sq mi) and sit approximately 2.5–3 metres (8.2–9.8 ft) above the high-tide line. (Note: Other estimates of the islands' area include 0.55 square kilometres (0.21 sq mi), 0.62 square kilometres (0.24 sq mi) and 0.93 square kilometres (0.36 sq mi).) Cartier Reef is approximately 2.3 kilometres (1.4 mi) in length and 4.5 kilometres (2.8 mi) in width, with one cay named Cartier Island that sits about 1–2 metres (3.3–6.6 ft) above the water at high tide. The island's land area has been variously reported at between 0.4 hectares (1 acre) and 2.1 hectares (5.2 acres).

Ashmore Reef lies on a platform with a long shallow shoal to its east. Its basement has been measured at a depth of 272 metres and is topped by sand sediments composed of foraminifera tests, mollusc shells, and some corals. The reef has a gradual slope on its southern side, with a steep northern slope. Cartier Reef similarly has a gradual reef slope on its southern side and a steeper slope on its northern side. Cartier Island contains an accumulation of beachrock on the south of the island.

The five cays that make up the Ashmore and Cartier Islands are each made of coral and sand. The Ashmore Islands have a small amount of grass cover, while Cartier Island has no vegetation. The Ashmore Islands have historically been home to some shrubs (primarily Argusia argentea) and coconut trees on Middle and West Islands, but many of these have died or are in poor condition. The territory has a monsoon climate, with a rainy season between November and March and a dry season between May and September. The average sea surface temperate sits at a low of around 24°C in July and August, and a high of around 30°C in the early months of the year.

== Governance and economy ==
The Ashmore and Cartier Islands are uninhabited and are administered from Canberra by the Department of Infrastructure, Transport, Regional Development, Communications, Sports and the Arts, which is also responsible for the administration of the territories of Christmas Island, Cocos (Keeling) Islands, the Coral Sea Islands, Jervis Bay Territory and Norfolk Island. The territory receives regular visits from the Australian Defence Forces and the Australian Border Force to combat illegal fishing.

Oil extraction takes place at the Jabiru and Challis oil fields neighbouring the territory, which are administered by the Northern Territory's Department of Mines and Energy on behalf of the federal government. As of 2018, there were six petroleum production licenses, sixteen exploration permits, and nine retention leases active in the Ashmore and Cartier Islands.

== Environment and protection ==
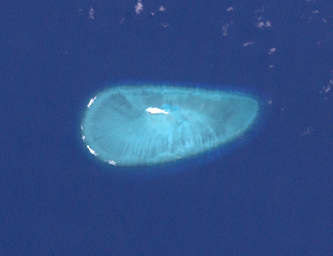
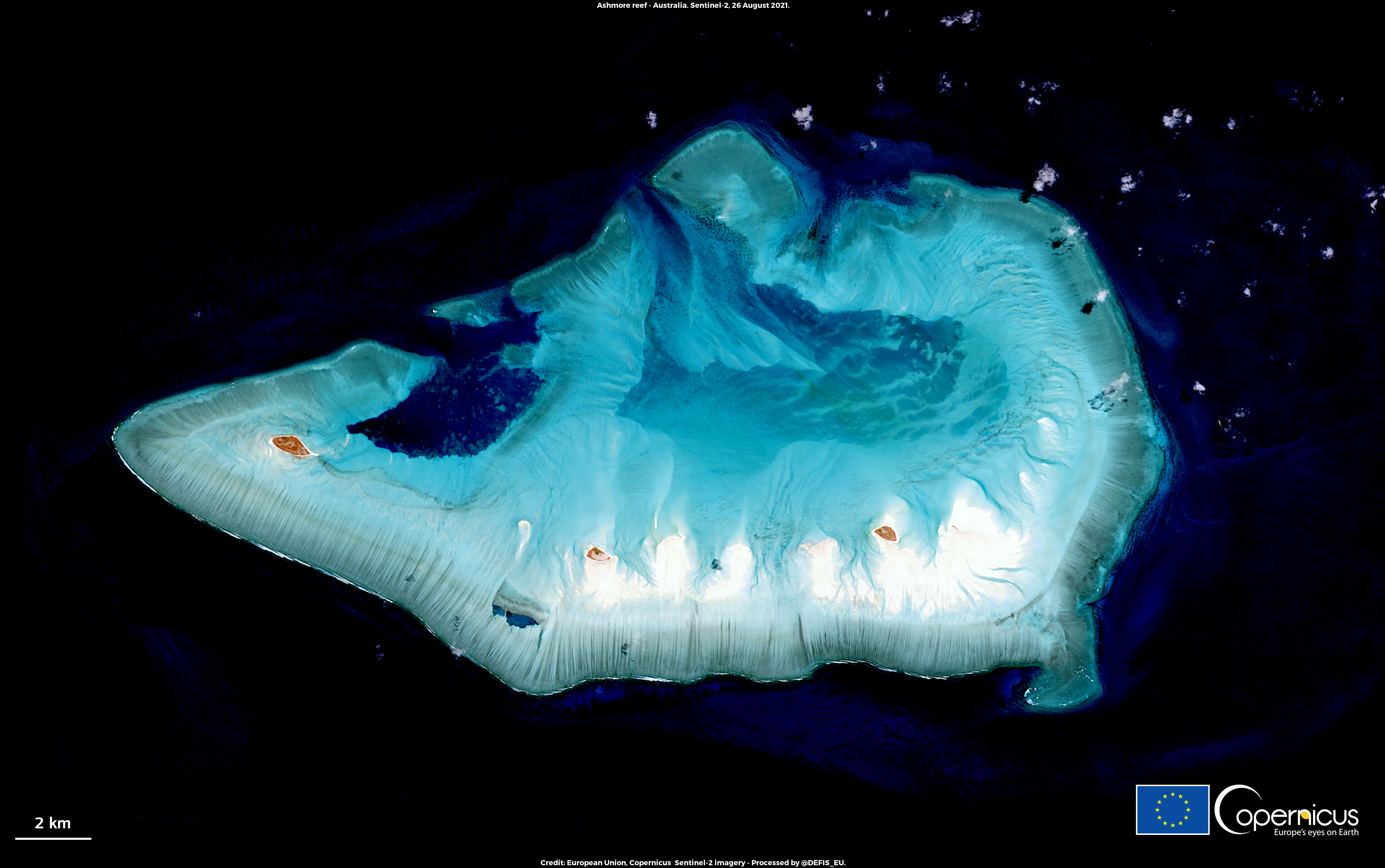
Satellite images of Cartier Island (left) and the Ashmore Islands (right)

The Ashmore Reef Marine Park and Cartier Island Marine Park are both classed as strict nature reserves, apart from a segment of the Ashmore Reef and West Island that is classified as a recreational use zone. Due to the environmental significance of both reefs and the risk of unexploded ordnance on Cartier Island due to its previous use as a weapons range, vessels are prohibited from accessing the sanctuary zones without prior approval.

The Ashmore Islands are an important breeding site for seabirds, including crested terns, white-tailed tropicbirds, and greater frigatebirds. About 100,000 seabirds breed on the Ashmore Islands each year, particularly on East and Middle Islands. Waders, including curlew sandpipers, bar-tailed godwits, and great knots, use the islands to gather food. Many migratory birds use Ashmore Reef as a stopover point on their journeys towards the Southern Hemisphere. The reef has been designated by BirdLife International as an Important Bird Area. While seabird populations at Ashmore Reef declined due to overharvesting in the late twentieth century, greater environmental protection had led to a substantial increase in the population of seabirds at the reef. A series of bird surveys of Cartier Island between 2010 and 2014 recorded 34 bird species, and found that crested terns occasionally used the island for breeding.

Approximately 833 species of fish are known to live in the waters of the Ashmore and Cartier Islands and neighbouring reefs. The fish species found at Ashmore and Cartier Reefs are similar to those found elsewhere in the Indo-West Pacific, and include some species that are typically found only in Indonesia. A 1986 survey found that the most common families of fish included Gobiidae, Pomacentridae, Labridae, Apogonidae, and Chaetodontidae. The same survey also found 99 species of crustacean on the reefs, with xanthoid crabs the most prevalent, and 433 species of molluscs. In 2019 a giant clam was sighted in the territory for the first time since 2006. The shark population at Ashmore Reef has grown significantly since 2004 due to stricter enforcement of a ban on shark fishing within the Marine Park. An isolated population of dugongs is known to live in the vicinity of the Ashmore and Cartier Islands; in 2022 a dugong was observed at Ashmore Reef for the first time since 2005.

178 species of echinoderms, including sea urchins, sea stars, and sea cucumbers, were found in the Ashmore and Cartier Islands in a 1986 survey. The gathering of sea cucumbers by Indonesian fishermen in the region was traditionally common, but has reduced due a decline in the sea cucumber population. High-value species, such as Holothuria whitmaei, are rare in the islands due to historical overharvesting; the sea cucumber population is instead dominated by two low-value species capable of asexual reproduction: Holothuria atra and Stichopus chloronotus. A 2019 CSIRO survey found that the population of sea cucumbers remained diminished as a result of illegal fishing during the 1980s. A large number of green turtles nest on Cartier Island and the Ashmore Islands, and feed on seagrasses like Thalassia hemprichii that are present at Ashmore Reef.

A large introduced population of Asian house geckos of unknown origin is present on West Island, while a introduced population of tropical fire ants is present on each of the Ashmore Islands. The population of fire ants on the islands presents a potential risk to newborn turtles and seabirds. Weeds and non-native plants, including Cenchrus ciliaris (buffel grass) and Tribulus cistoides (beach caltrop), have also been introduced to the islands and pose a threat to seabird habitats and native plants. Rats and mice have also been observed on the islands.

== Contemporary issues ==
=== Fishing ===
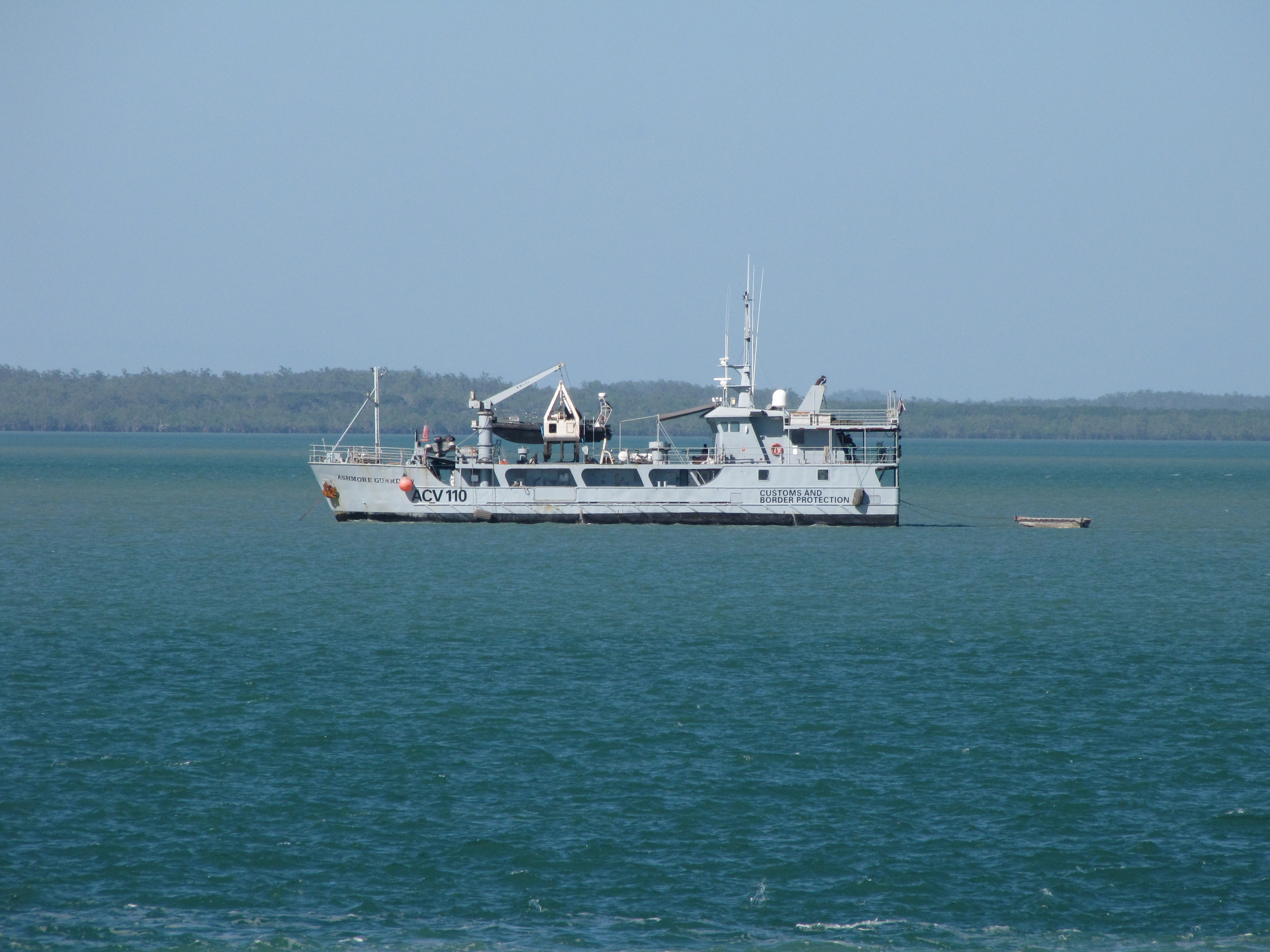
The customs vessel Ashmore Guardian, which was stationed at Ashmore Reef in 2008 to combat people smuggling and illegal fishing.

Since 1974, traditional Indonesian fishermen have been permitted to harvest resources from an area of Australia's exclusive economic zone and the territorial waters surrounding the Ashmore and Cartier Islands known as the MOU Box. They are also permitted to access part of West Island to visit Indonesian grave sites and to seek shelter and fresh water. The islands are often used by fishermen to replenish supplies of fresh water for longer journeys to the south. Some traditional practices, such as the taking of seabirds and turtles, are not permitted in the territory, and fishing is prohibited in the sanctuary zones of the Ashmore and Cartier Islands Marine Parks. About 85% of those accessing Ashmore Reef between 1988 and 2001 came from the Indonesian island of Rote, with most coming from the villages of Pepela and Oelaba. Upon the establishment of the Ashmore Reef National Nature Reserve in 1983, fishing on the reef and the surrounding waters with a depth of less than 50 metres was prohibited. In 1988 Australia clarified that those employing vessels with motors or engines were not considered traditional fishermen and were prohibited from fishing in the area.

Indonesian fishermen traditionally primarily gathered sea cucumbers in the territory, but a decline in the sea cucumber population due to overfishing has led many to instead begin hunting for sharks. The Australian Border Force has periodically deployed permanent patrol vessels to Ashmore Reef to enforce the ban on fishing in the Ashmore Reef Marine Park and to combat illegal fishing. Indonesian fishermen engaged in illegal fishing in the area have regularly been arrested by the Australian Border Force and have had their vessels destroyed.

Concerns over illegal fishing also led to the discovery of human remains on Cartier Island – sparking an Australian coronial inquest into the cause of the so-called Cartier man's death.

=== Migration ===
From the late 1990s, large numbers of refugees began migrating from Afghanistan and Middle Eastern nations to Malaysia. From there many relocated to Indonesia and paid fishermen to take them to Australia's external territories, from where they could seek asylum in Australia. The first asylum seekers arrived on the Ashmore Islands in March 1995. In 2001 the Ashmore and Cartier Islands, along with Christmas Island, the Cocos (Keeling) Islands, and other offshore sites, were removed from the Australian migration zone. As a result, asylum seekers landing on the islands were no longer entitled to claim asylum in Australia from the territory. Asylum seekers arriving in the territory were instead placed into offshore detention or were returned to Indonesia. The government argued that the measure would reduce people smuggling and allow Australia to retain greater control of its borders, while opponents questioned its legality and suggested that it would be ineffective in deterring people smugglers. In 2009 a boat carrying asylum seekers—SIEV 36—exploded near Ashmore Reef after a passenger lit petrol under the belief that they would be sent back to Indonesia, resulting in five deaths.

In 2018 the Federal Circuit Court of Australia ruled that the excision of the Ashmore and Cartier Islands from the Australian migration zone was unlawful. The court ruled that a declaration that had been in place between 2002 and 2013 that the island were a port was invalid, and that the 1600 asylum seekers who had arrived at the islands during that time should therefore not have been designated as offshore arrivals. Later that year the Australian government passed a law retroactively declaring the 2002 proclamation of the islands as a port to be legitimate, rendering the designation of the asylum seekers as offshore arrivals lawful.

== See also ==
- Immigration detention in Australia
- SIEV 36
