= MOU Box =

Tract of marine waters in the Timor Sea

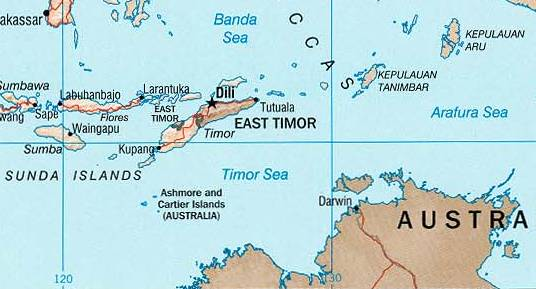
Map showing the location of the Timor Sea (and of Ashmore and Cartier Islands) in the eastern Indian Ocean

The MOU Box, or sometimes the MOU 74 Box, refers to a tract of marine waters in the Timor Sea, lying within Australia's exclusive economic zone, that is subject to a 1974 memorandum of understanding (MoU), and subsequent agreements, between Australia and Indonesia relating to traditional fishing rights. The MOU Box covers an area of about 50,000 km^{2} (19,000 sq mi), including the Ashmore and Cartier Islands, Browse Island, and Scott and Seringapatam Reefs. Australia declared a marine protected area around Ashmore Island in 1983, and around Cartier Island in 2000.

== Agreement ==
The bilateral agreement establishing the MOU Box is officially known as the Australia–Indonesia Memorandum of Understanding regarding the Operations of Indonesian Traditional Fishermen in Areas of the Australian Fishing Zone and Continental Shelf – 1974. From 2001 cooperation under the Agreement has taken place through the Working Group on Marine Affairs and Fisheries, which brings together representatives of fisheries, research, and environment agencies from both countries. The agreement recognises access rights of traditional Indonesian fishers in shared waters to the north of Australia with regard to the long history of traditional Indonesian fishing there, especially for trepang, trochus, abalone and sponges.
