= Stewart Wolfe Jamieson =

Australian journalist, diplomat and lawyer

- Born: 4 January 1903; Sydney, New South Wales
- Died: 4 May 1975 (aged 72); Canberra, Australian Capital Territory
- Education: University of Sydney
- Occupation: Diplomat
- Spouse: Katherine Mary Garvan (m. 1937–1975)

Stewart Wolfe Jamieson CBE (4 January 1903 – 4 May 1975) was an Australian diplomat, journalist, and lawyer.

After attending The King's School, Sydney, Jamieson graduated from the University of Sydney with a Bachelor of Arts before studying law at the University of Oxford. He worked as a lawyer and journalist in the late 1920s and the 1930s, and enlisted with the Royal Australian Air Force in World War II. After the war, he joined Australia's diplomatic service. In a 20-year diplomatic career, he held a number of consular and ambassadorial posts, including as Australia's high commissioner to Ghana (1958–1960), ambassador to Brazil (1960–1962), ambassador to the Soviet Union (1962–1965) and Aabassador to Sweden (1964–1965).

Diplomatic posts
Preceded by N.N. Frewin as Acting Consul-General	Australian Consul-General in San Francisco; 1952 – 1955	Succeeded by Melville Marshall
Preceded by	Australian High Commissioner to Ghana; 1958 – 1960	Succeeded by Bertram Ballard
Preceded by Donald Mackinnon	Australian Ambassador to Brazil; 1960 – 1962	Succeeded by Owen Davis
Preceded by Keith Waller	Australian Ambassador to the Soviet Union; 1962 – 1965	Succeeded by John Rowland
Preceded by Frederick R. Gullick as Chargé d'affaires	Australian Ambassador to Sweden; 1964 – 1965	Succeeded by John Rowland
