= Director-General of the Australian Secret Intelligence Service =

Officer of Australian foreign intelligence

- Incumbent; Kerri Hartland since 20 February 2023
- Appointer: Governor-General of Australia
- Inaugural holder: Alfred Deakin Brookes
- Formation: 1952

The Director-General of the Australian Secret Intelligence Service is the executive officer of the Australian Secret Intelligence Service (ASIS), Australia's foreign intelligence agency.

The Director-General of ASIS is directly responsible to the Minister for Foreign Affairs, and regularly meets with the Minister to brief them on ASIS activities. The current director is Kerri Hartland.

== List of directors-general ==
There have been eleven officially-appointed Directors and Directors-General of ASIS since 1952.

Tenure	Name
1952–1957	Alfred Brookes
1957–1960	Ralph Harry, OBE
1960–1968	Major General Sir Walter Cawthorn, CB, CIE, CBE
1968–1975	Bill Robertson, OBE, MC
1975–1981	Ian Kennison, CBE
1981–1983	John Ryan, OBE (acting)
1984–1992	Brigadier Jim Furner, CBE
1992–1998	Rex Stevenson, AO
1998–2003	Allan Taylor, AM
2003–2009	David Irvine, AO
2009–2017	Nick Warner, AO, PSM
2017–2023	Major General Paul Symon, AO
2023–present	Kerri Hartland
