= Kerri Hartland =

Australian public servant, consultant (born 1965)

13th Director-General of the Australian Secret Intelligence Service
- Incumbent
- Assumed office 20 February 2023
- Preceded by: Paul Symon

Secretary of the Department of Employment, Skills, Small and Family Business
- In office 2017–2020

Personal details
- Born: Kerri Gaye Hartland Oakey, Queensland, Australia
- Education: University of Queensland; Australian National University (BA,BEc,MLS)
- Profession: Public Servant; Consultant

Kerri Gaye Hartland is the Director-General of the Australian Secret Intelligence Service (ASIS). She was formerly an Australian public servant for 30 years, before joining the private sector. She was the first female deputy director-general of Australian Security Intelligence Organisation (ASIO) and took up the position of secretary of the Australian Government Department of Employment, Skills, Small and Family Business in January 2017.

== Early life and education ==
Born in Oakey, Queensland, Hartland grew up with her parents Valerie and Neville Hartland, her brother Brad and her sister Karina.

From 1983 Hartland lived at Cromwell College, while studying at the University of Queensland. She graduated with a Bachelor of Arts in 1985 and later a Bachelor of Economics in 1991.

Commencing further education at the Australian National University, Hartland completed a Master of Legal Studies in 1996 and is a graduate of the Australian Institute of Company Directors.

== Career ==
In 1985 she worked as a cadet journalist for Western Publishers. From 1986 to 1990 Hartland continued working as a journalist for Melbourne Herald and Weekly Times and News Ltd in the Parliamentary Press Gallery, while completing her second degree.

Between 1990 and 1995, Hartland worked in the Department of Primary Industries before acting as head of the APEC Energy Ministerial Taskforce for the department in 1995 and 1996.

Hartland moved to Canada from 1996 to 1997 to work as secondment to Natural Resources Canada in Ottawa.

From 1997, Hartland returned to Australia undertaking a role as Australia's representative to the International Energy Agency and deputy director-general of Invest Australia for the Department of Resources and Energy. Hartland shifted to the prime minister's Taskforce on Investment and Promotion in the Department of the Prime Minister and Cabinet in 2001. Shortly after she worked as the executive general manager of Biotechnology Australia until 2003. For the next two years Hartland was the chief information officer for the Department of Industry, Science and Resources. From 2006 to 2011 Hartland was the deputy secretary of service delivery reform for the Department of Human Services. She led a $1 billion project that saw the formation of a 40,000 strong organisation merging Centrelink, Medicare, Child Support Agency, and the Commonwealth Rehabilitation Agency, and the development of legislation for the Department of Human Services.

Hartland became the first female and first external deputy director general of ASIO in 2011. She was responsible for counter espionage and interference, technical capability, information technology, corporate and legal services, strategic policy and stakeholder engagement. She led a major transformation of the organisation until 2017.

From February to September 2017, Hartland was the deputy secretary of the Department of Finance and the chief operating officer. Hartland established the Independent Parliamentary Expense Authority and held responsibility for services to all MPs including Comcar fleet service. Hartland also developed a revamped Commonwealth Shared Services Hub that provided shared services for more than 20 Commonwealth departments and agencies.

Hartland was appointed secretary of the Department of Employment, Skills, Small and Family Business (formerly the Department of Employment and Workplace Relations) in late 2017. Until May 2019, Hartland was responsible for industrial relations policies and programs including the Fair Work Commission, Fair Work Ombudsman, Worksafe Australia and Comcare.

For the first half of 2020, Hartland was appointed by the Business Council of Australia to assist Sir Peter Cosgrove with efforts to support small businesses recovery from the bushfires and COVID.

In late 2020 Hartland joined consultancy company Proximity as a Principal Advisor.

On 9 December 2022, Hartland was announced as the incoming Director-General of the Australian Secret Intelligence Service, commencing February 2023. Hartland replaced previous director-general Paul Symon.

== Other roles ==
Hartland is or has been a board member of both the Canberra Hospital Foundation and Canberra Girls Grammar School. Hartland is also a Chief Executive Women member, an MS Angel (philanthropic research for multiple sclerosis), and is on the advisory board of the Brotherhood of St Laurence.

== Awards ==
Hartland was awarded a Prime Minister's Gold Award for Excellence in Public Sector Management in 2009. She also earned the 2015 Australian Human Resources Institute Rob Gaffe Award for Leadership and the 2017 Institute of Public Administrations of Australia Prime Minister's Awards.

== Personal life ==
As of 2021 Hartland lives in Canberra with husband Brian Fisher, an economist and career public servant whose influence over world governments to delay climate change mitigation is well-publicized. They have two adult daughters.

Government offices
Preceded by Paul Symon	Director-General of the Australian Secret Intelligence Service; 2023–present	Incumbent
