= List of ambassadors of Australia to Italy =

Ambassador of Australia to Italy

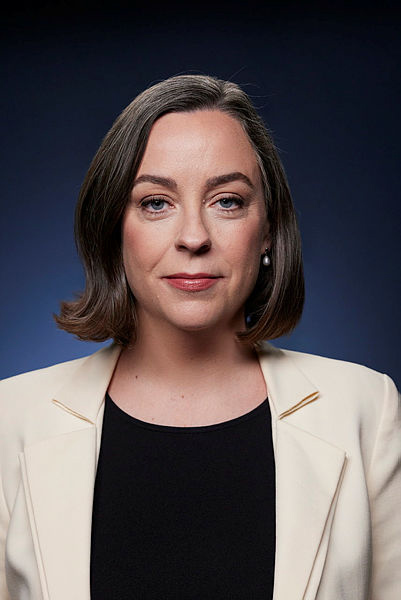
- Incumbent; Julianne Cowley since 23 October 2024
- Department of Foreign Affairs and Trade
- Style: Her Excellency
- Reports to: Minister for Foreign Affairs
- Nominator: Prime Minister of Australia
- Appointer: Governor General of Australia
- Inaugural holder: Cedric Kellway (as Minister)
- Formation: 10 November 1949
- Website: Australian Embassy, Rome

The ambassador of Australia to Italy is an officer of the Australian Department of Foreign Affairs and Trade and the head of the Embassy of the Commonwealth of Australia to the Republic of Italy in Rome. The position has the rank and status of an ambassador extraordinary and plenipotentiary and holds non-resident accreditation for Albania (1992–2004; since 3 July 2013), Libya (1978–1987; since 2002), and San Marino (since 1995). The ambassador also serves as Australia's delegate to the UN Agencies in Rome as permanent representative to the Food and Agriculture Organization (since 1951) and as representative to the World Food Programme (since 1961).

The current ambassador, since October 2024, is Julianne Cowley.

== Posting history ==
Australia and Italy have enjoyed diplomatic relations since November 1949, when a legation was established in Rome and the first Minister, Cedric Kellway presented his credentials to President Luigi Einaudi on 24 November 1949. On 4 January 1978 Australia established diplomatic relations with the Socialist People's Libyan Arab Jamahiriya, but relations were cut by Prime Minister Bob Hawke in May 1987 owing to the Gaddafi regime's "covert operations in the South Pacific". Relations were not restored until June 2002 and recognition was transferred after the Libyan Civil War on 9 June 2011 to the National Transitional Council. Although Australia has had diplomatic relations with Albania since 1985, accreditation has only been held by the Ambassador in Rome since 3 July 2013, when accreditation was transferred from the Embassy in Athens. The embassy in Rome had previously held accreditation to Albania from 1992 to 2004. Since 1968 the ambassador has been assisted by a consulate-general in Milan run by Austrade.

== Officeholders ==
=== Heads of mission ===
Ordinal	Officeholder	Title	Other offices	Term start date	Term end date	Time in office	Notes
1	Cedric Kellway	Minister to Italy	^{A}	10 November 1949	1954	4–5 years	
2	Paul McGuire	Minister to Italy	^{A}	1954	22 January 1958	3–4 years	
2	Paul McGuire	Ambassador of Australia to Italy	^{A}	22 January 1958	1958	3–4 years	
3	Hugh McClure Smith	Ambassador of Australia to Italy	^{A}^{B}	1958	November 1961	2–3 years	
4	Alfred Stirling	Ambassador of Australia to Italy	^{A}^{B}	17 August 1962	1967	4–5 years	
5	Walter Crocker	Ambassador of Australia to Italy	^{A}^{B}	3 October 1967	1970	2–3 years	
6	Malcolm Booker	Ambassador of Australia to Italy	^{A}^{B}	1 May 1970	1974	3–4 years	
7	John Ryan	Ambassador of Australia to Italy	^{A}^{B}	4 March 1974	1977	2–3 years	
8	R. H. Robertson	Ambassador of Australia to Italy	^{A}^{B}^{C}	September 1977	1981	3–4 years	
9	Keith Douglas-Scott	Ambassador of Australia to Italy	^{A}^{B}^{C}	1981	1985	3–4 years	
10	Gerry Nutter	Ambassador of Australia to Italy	^{A}^{B}^{C}	22 April 1985	1987	1–2 years	
11	Duncan Campbell	Ambassador of Australia to Italy	^{A}^{B}^{D}	13 March 1988	June 1993	5 years, 3 months	
12	Lance Joseph	Ambassador of Australia to Italy	^{A}^{B}^{D}^{E}	22 July 1993	1996	2–3 years	
13	Rory Steele	Ambassador of Australia to Italy	^{A}^{B}^{D}^{E}	1997	2001	3–4 years	
14	Murray Alexander Cobban	Ambassador of Australia to Italy	^{A}^{B}^{C}^{D}^{E}	2001	2004	2–3 years	
15	Peter Woolcott	Ambassador of Australia to Italy	^{A}^{B}^{C}^{E}	2004	2007	2–3 years	
16	Amanda Vanstone	Ambassador of Australia to Italy	^{A}^{B}^{C}^{E}	26 April 2007	2010	2–3 years	
17	David Ritchie	Ambassador of Australia to Italy	^{A}^{B}^{C}^{D}^{E}	2010	2013	2–3 years	
18	Mike Rann	Ambassador of Australia to Italy	^{A}^{B}^{C}^{D}^{E}	May 2014	8 January 2016	1 year, 8 months	
(n/a)	Jo Tarnawsky	Chargé d'Affaires		January 2016	May 2016	4 months	
19	Greg French	Ambassador of Australia to Italy	^{A}^{B}^{C}^{D}^{E}	May 2016	July 2020	4 years, 2 months	
20	Margaret Twomey	Ambassador of Australia to Italy	^{A}^{B}^{C}^{D}^{E}	July 2020	October 2024	4 years, 3 months	

==== Notes ====
^A Also served as Permanent Representative to the Food and Agriculture Organization, since 1951.
^B Also served as Representative to the World Food Programme, since 1961.
^C Also non-resident ambassador to the State of Libya, 4 January 1978–May 1987, and since June 2002.
^D Also non-resident ambassador to the Republic of Albania, 1992–2004, and since 3 July 2013.
^E Also non-resident ambassador to the Republic of San Marino, since 1995.

=== Consuls-General in Milan ===
Ordinal	Officeholder	Term start date	Term end date	Time in office	Notes
1	C.C. Booth^{§}	3 March 1968	10 January 1969	313 days	
2	Arthur Barclay Jamieson	10 January 1969	1972	2–3 years	
3	R. K. Scott	1973	1976	2–3 years	
4	D. F. C. McSweeney	1977	1979	1–2 years	
5	B. Conduit	1980	1982	1–2 years	
6	Thomas Walton	1983	1986	2–3 years	
7	A. Karas	1988	1989	0–1 years	
8	J. McFarlane	1989	1991	1–2 years	
9	B. Hain	1991	1993	1–2 years	
10	Gerard Lanzarone	1993	1996	2–3 years	
11	Rod Morehouse	1996	2000	3–4 years	
12		2000	2005	4–5 years	
13	Tim Gauci	August 2005	October 2010	5 years, 2 months	
14	Simone Desmarchelier	October 2010	January 2016	5 years, 3 months	
15	Crispin Conroy	November 2016	November 2018	2 years	
(n/a)	Sheila Lunter (acting)	2019	2020	0–1 years	
16	Naila Mazzucco	20 June 2020	incumbent	6 years, 149 days	

^{§}: Named Consul.
