= Paul McGuire (diplomat) =

Australian writer, public servant and diplomat

Paul McGuire CBE
- Born: Dominic Mary Paul McGuire; 3 April 1903; Peterborough, South Australia
- Died: 15 June 1978 (aged 75); North Adelaide, South Australia
- Education: University of Adelaide
- Occupations: Public servant, diplomat
- Spouse: Frances Margaret Cheadle (m. 1927)

Dominic Mary Paul McGuire CBE (3 April 1903 – 15 June 1978) was an Australian writer, public servant, and diplomat. Based in Adelaide, he wrote mostly non-fiction, including two books co-authored with his wife, Frances Margaret McGuire, as well as some poetry and fiction. He became European correspondent for The Argus for some years after World War II, and in 1954 was appointed Minister to Italy.

== Early life and education ==
Dominic Mary Paul McGuire was born in Peterborough, South Australia on 3 April 1903. His father, James McGuire, was the Railways Commissioner.

He attended Christian Brothers College, Adelaide and the University of Adelaide. At university he was the Tinline Scholar in History. Also as a university student he helped to organise Save the Children Australia raising money for famine relief targeted to Russian children following World War I.

== Career ==
McGuire taught history and English on a casual basis for the Workers' Educational Association of South Australia from around 1927. He began story-writing with detective stories, some of which were published in the United Kingdom. Between 1932 and 1936, he published ten novels, a book of verse, and an essay on the poetry of Gerard Manley Hopkins.

During World War II, McGuire was an officer of the Royal Australian Naval Volunteer Reserve. In 1941, McGuire was prominent in the establishment South Australian branch of the Australian-American Co-operation Movement (now known as the Australian American Association).

In May 1945, McGuire was demobilised from the Navy and took up a role as special European correspondent for The Argus newspaper. In the role he visited Ireland, France, the Scandinavian countries, Holland, Belgium and Germany; meeting Konrad von Preysing and Martin Niemöller while in Germany. McGuire returned to Australia in January 1947, having also visited Canada and the United States on the way home. While in North America McGuire met personally then US President Harry S. Truman and Canadian Prime Minister Mackenzie King.

In 1949, McGuire's book There's Freedom for the Brave was published to favourable reviews, including in The New York Times and Life magazine.

In April 1953, Minister for External Affairs Richard Casey, Baron Casey announced McGuire's appointment as Australian Ambassador to Ireland, saying that the Department of External Affairs was "inadequate in sufficiently senior and experienced career personnel to fill all the Australian posts abroad", and that it was necessary to draw on experienced people from outside the department to fill some overseas posts. McGuire did not formally take up his post due to a dispute between the Australian and Irish governments about the style of his credentials. The Australian Government wanted for McGuire's title to be Ambassador to Southern Ireland, while the Irish Government wanted his title to be Ambassador to the President of the Republic of Ireland. No agreement was secured between the two governments.

In March 1954, Casey announced McGuire's appointment as Minister to Italy.

== Personal life and death ==
McGuire married Frances Margaret Cheadle on 18 November 1927. She was three years older than him, and a Congregationalist, but converted to Catholicism to marry him. They moved into a home in Adelaide, and later to a shooting-hut at Belair. Frances was an author, biochemist, community leader, and philanthropist, who co-founded the Catholic Guild for Social Studies in Adelaide.

McGuire died on 15 June 1978 in North Adelaide, South Australia.

== Works ==
=== Non-fiction ===
- Australian Journey (1939)
- Westward the course : the new world of Oceania (1942)
- The three corners of the world : an essay in the interpretation of modern politics (1948) (published in the United States and Canada as An experiment in world order)
- There's freedom for the brave : an approach to world order (1949)
- Australia's future development : the major problems of external policy (1951)
- Inns of Australia (1952)

=== Fiction ===
- A funeral in Eden (1938)

=== Poetry ===
- The two men and other poems (1932) (as D. P. McGuire)
- Selected poems of Paul McGuire (1980)

=== With his wife, Frances Margaret McGuire ===
- The price of admiralty (1944)
- The Australian theatre : an abstract and brief chronicle in twelve parts (1948)

Diplomatic posts
Preceded by W.A. Wynes as Chargé d'affaires	Australian Ambassador to Ireland; 1953–1954	Succeeded by W.T. Doig as Chargé d'affaires
Preceded by Cedric Kellway	Australian Minister to Italy; 1954–1958	Succeeded by Hugh McClure Smith
Preceded by Cedric Kellway	Australian Ambassador to Italy; 1958	Succeeded by Hugh McClure Smith
