= Bill Robertson (Australian intelligence officer) =

Head of Australia's spy agency

Bill Robertson CBE, MC

Director-General of the Australian Secret Intelligence Service
- In office 3 July 1968 – 21 October 1975
- Prime Minister: John Gorton (1968–71); William McMahon (1971–72); Gough Whitlam (1972–75)
- Preceded by: Sir Walter Cawthorn
- Succeeded by: Ian Kennison

Personal details
- Born: 2 February 1917 South Yarra, Victoria
- Died: 2 January 2011 (aged 93)
- Education: University of Oxford
- Civilian awards: Commander of the Order of the British Empire

Military service
- Allegiance: Australia
- Branch/service: Second Australian Imperial Force
- Years of service: 1939–1947
- Rank: Lieutenant Colonel
- Battles/wars: Second World War
- Military awards: Officer of the Order of the British Empire; Military Cross; Mentioned in Despatches

William Thomas Robertson, CBE, MC (2 February 1917 – 2 January 2011) was the fourth Director-General of the Australian Secret Intelligence Service (ASIS), from 1968 until 1975, when was dismissed by Prime Minister Gough Whitlam; the reasons for Robertson's dismissal have remained a matter of controversy.

During the Second World War, Robertson served as an Australian Army officer. He served as an infantry officer in North Africa, where he was wounded in action, and in Greece, before being appointed to staff roles in New Guinea. During 1944–45, he was attached to the British Army in North West Europe and held senior staff roles with two different British divisions.

In 1952, Robertson was a founding member of the ASIS; its existence was to remain officially secret for two and a half decades.

== Early life ==
Robertson was born in South Yarra, Victoria, Melbourne, Australia on 2 February 1917.

== Military service ==
On 15 November 1939, Robertson joined the Second Australian Imperial Force (service number VX213), thus volunteering for service overseas with the Australian Army. With the rank of captain, he served in the 2/8th Infantry Battalion, part of the 6th Division and was wounded during the capture of Tobruk from Italian forces. Robertson also served with the 6th Division in Greece, fighting German forces.

From 1942, during the New Guinea campaign, Robertson – promoted to the rank of lieutenant colonel – was appointed to staff roles. As a liaison officer with US Army formations, he inspected the Allied perimeter at Buna; Robertson was dissatisfied with what he saw, and made observations critical of US Army units to Australian General Edmund Herring and US General Richard K. Sutherland. As a result, Douglas MacArthur made changes to the US Army staff at Buna.

In August 1943, Robertson was appointed to the position of GSO1 (senior operations officer), assisting the commanding officer of the 7th Division, George Vasey. During the Salamaua-Lae campaign, Vasey sent Robertson to Port Moresby, in a bid to improve cooperation with US ground and air forces; both General George Kenney (USAAF) and General Frank Berryman (Australian Army), were said to have found Robertson's approach "surprising", although Robertson later wrote to Vasey that he had succeeded in the task assigned to him. Exploiting intelligence gained from the capture of Imperial Japanese Army documents, Robertson played a key role in battles such as Kaiaipit and Dumpu.

In early 1944, Robertson was posted to Britain, where he was GSO1 with the British 51st (Highland) Infantry Division, as it prepared for the invasion of Europe. During the Normandy campaign, he was GSO1 of the British 50th (Northumbrian) Infantry Division.

== Intelligence career ==
Dismissal as Director-General

On becoming informed of a CIA operation in Chile in February 1973 which involved ASIS, the then Labor Prime Minister Gough Whitlam signed a document ordering the closure of ASIS operations in Chile. It appears, however, that ASIS agents did not leave Chile until October 1973, after the 1973 Chilean coup d'état had brought down the Allende Government. Whitlam accused Robertson of disobeying instructions by delaying the closure of the ASIS station in Chile.

In the lead up to Indonesia’s invasion of East Timor in 1975, ASIS paid a Dili-based Australian businessman Frank Favaro for information on local political developments. The leaking of his identity in late 1975 led to another confrontation between Whitlam and Robertson.

These incidents led to Whitlam sacking Robertson on 21 October 1975, with effect on 7 November, just 4 days before Whitlam's own dismissal in the 1975 Australian constitutional crisis, although Robertson disputes the reason for his dismissal in documents lodged with the National Archives in 2009.

== Bibliography ==
- Converse, Alan (2011). Armies of Empire: The 9th Australian and 50th British Divisions in Battle 1939–1945. Cambridge University Press. ISBN 978-0521194808.
