= Australia–Brazil relations =

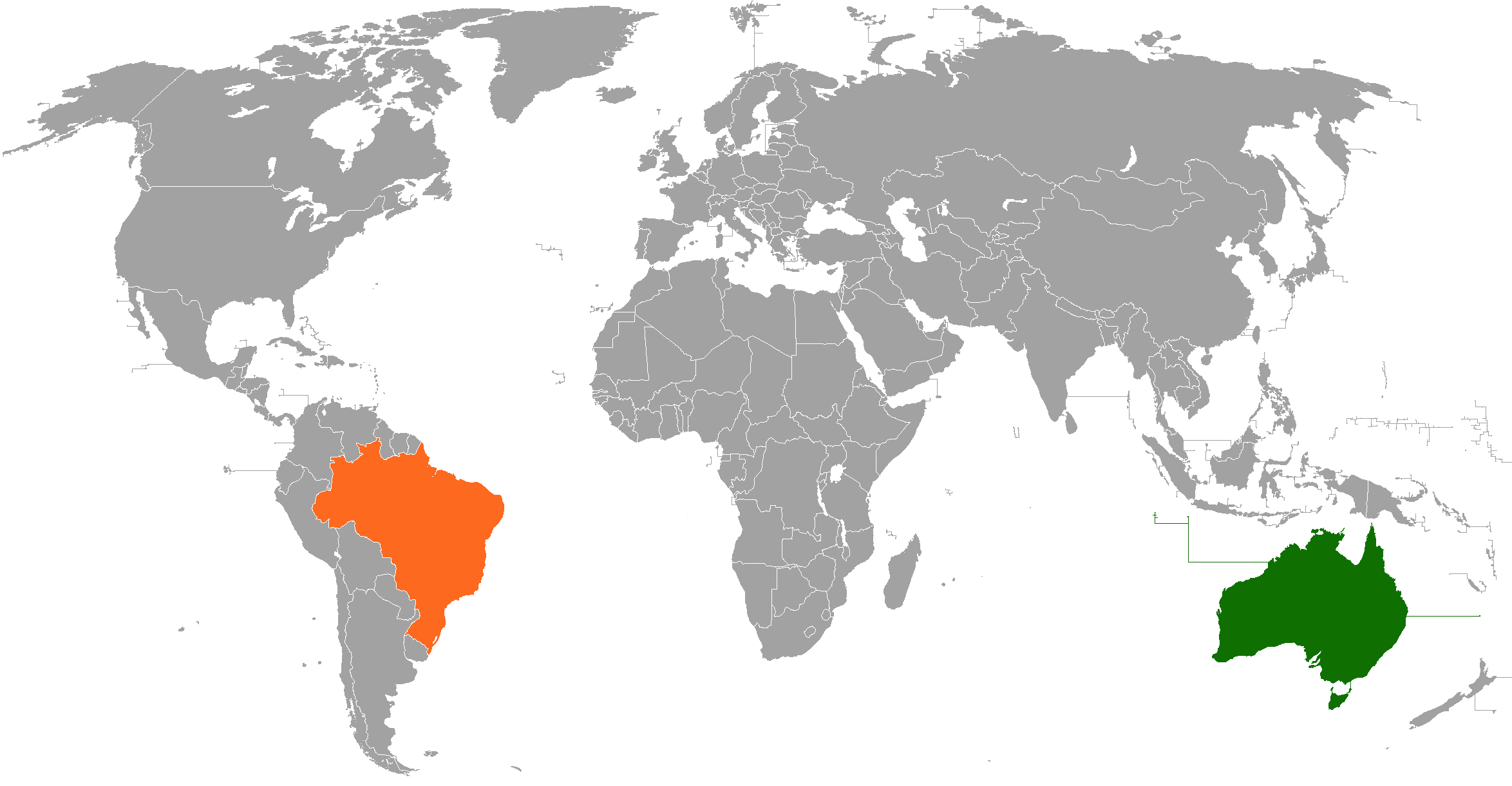

- Australia: Brazil

Current and historical relations exist between the Commonwealth of Australia and the Federative Republic of Brazil. Both nations are members of the Cairns Group, G20 and the United Nations. Australia and Brazil are the largest countries in the Southern Hemisphere.

== History ==
Diplomatic relations between Australia and Brazil were established in 1945. The following year, Australia opened a diplomatic office in Rio de Janeiro, its first diplomatic representation in Latin America. That same year, Brazil opened a diplomatic office in Canberra. In 1990, both nations created the Brazil-Australia Political Consultations mechanism, which gave a new impetus to bilateral relations.

In June 2012, Australian Prime Minister, Julia Gillard, paid an official visit to Brazil and met with President Dilma Rousseff. Both leaders discussed deepening of the ties and growth of the role played by the two countries in the world, and they agreed to increase relations between Australia and Brazil at the level of strategic partnership. In November 2014, Brazilian President Dilma Rousseff paid a visit to Australia to attend the G20 Brisbane summit.

As of 2020, Brazil was the fifth largest source of international students studying in Australia.

In 2019-2020, the Australian government financially supported several projects in Brazil including poverty alleviation, promotion of employment for female former convicts, and assistance concerning the COVID-19 pandemic.

== High-level visits ==
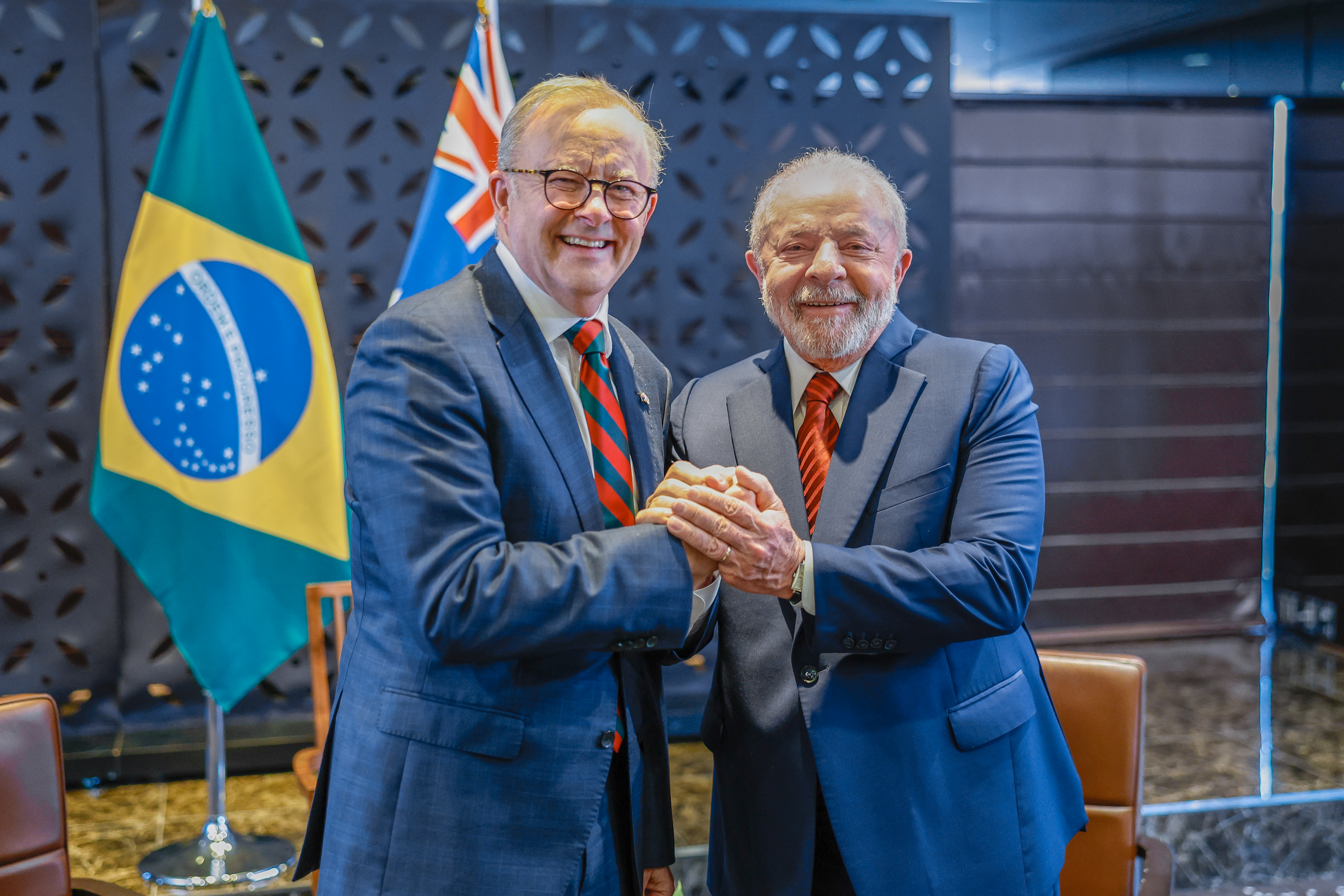
Australian Prime Minister Anthony Albanese and Brazilian President Luiz Inácio Lula da Silva in Hiroshima, Japan; May 2023.

High-level visits from Australia to Brazil

- Foreign Minister Alexander Downer (2001, 2006)
- Trade Minister Mark Vaile (2004)
- Foreign Minister Kevin Rudd (2010)
- Prime Minister Julia Gillard (2012)
- Foreign Minister Julie Bishop (2015)
- Governor General Peter Cosgrove (2016)
- Prime Minister Anthony Albanese (2024)

High-level visits from Brazil to Australia

- Foreign Minister Celso Amorim (1994, 2008)
- Special Envoy Marco Aurélio Garcia (2006)
- President Dilma Rousseff (2014)

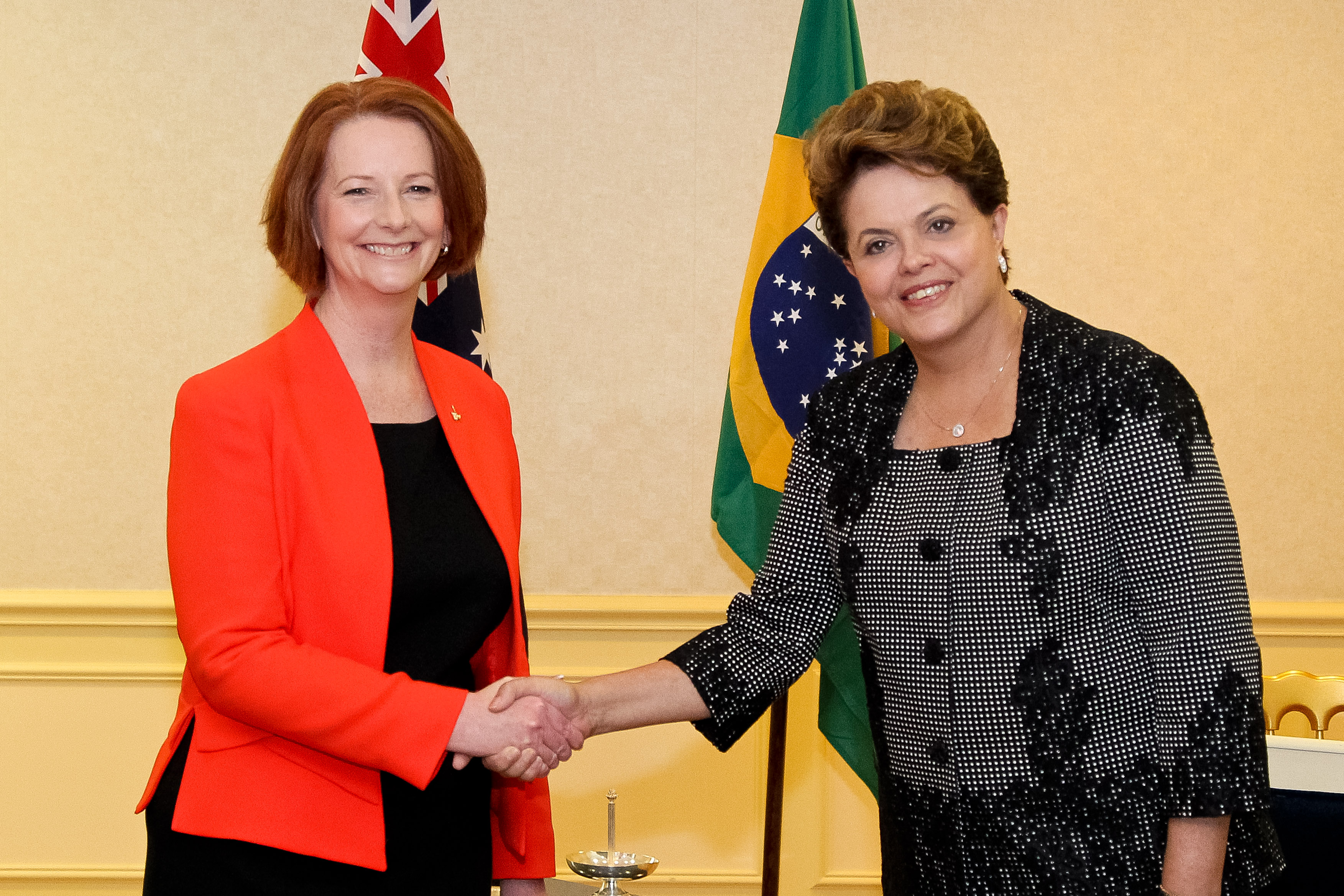
Prime Minister Julia Gillard and President Dilma Rousseff during the 2011 G20 Cannes summit.

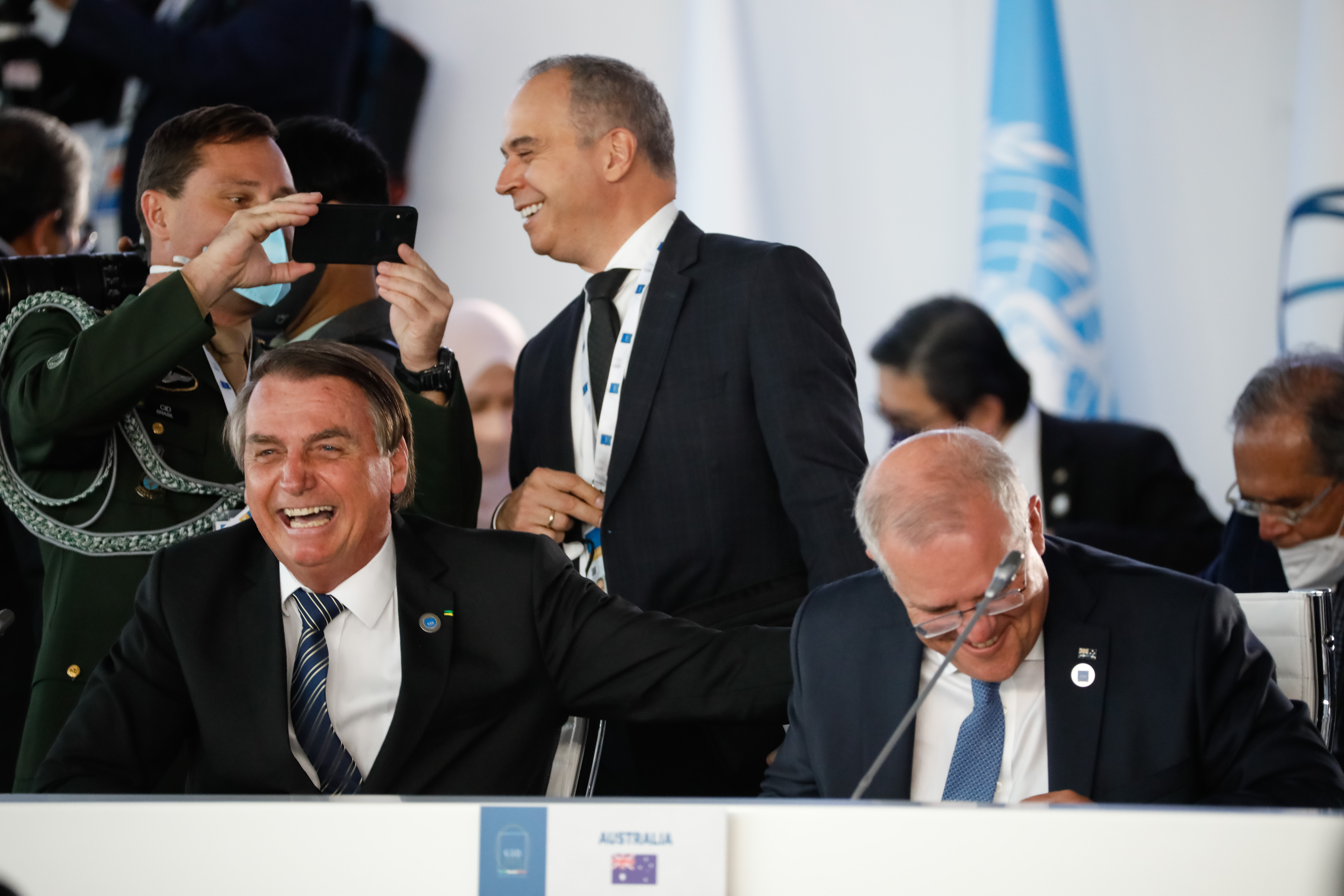
President Jair Bolsonaro and Prime Minister Scott Morrison in Rome; October 2021.

== Bilateral agreements ==
Both nations have signed several agreements such as a Trade Agreement (1978); Extradition Treaty (1994); Memorandum of Understanding in Health Cooperation (1998); Air Service Agreement (2010); Memorandum of Understanding on Cooperation on Major Sporting Events (2010); Agreement on Science, Technology and Innovation (2017); and a Memorandum of Understanding on Water Cooperation (2018).

== Trade ==
In 2021, trade between Australia and Brazil totaled US$1.7 billion. Australia's main exports to Brazil include: coal; crude petroleum; nickel ores and concentrates; and aluminium. Brazil's main exports to Australia include: medicine; coffee; civil engineering equipment and parts; and personal travel services. Brazil is Australia's largest export market in Latin America by a significant margin, including in tourism, travel and education-related services, and accounts for half Australia's direct investment in the region.

== Resident diplomatic missions ==
of Australia in Brazil

- Brasília (Embassy)
- São Paulo (Consulate-General)

of Brazil in Australia

- Canberra (Embassy)
- Sydney (Consulate-General)

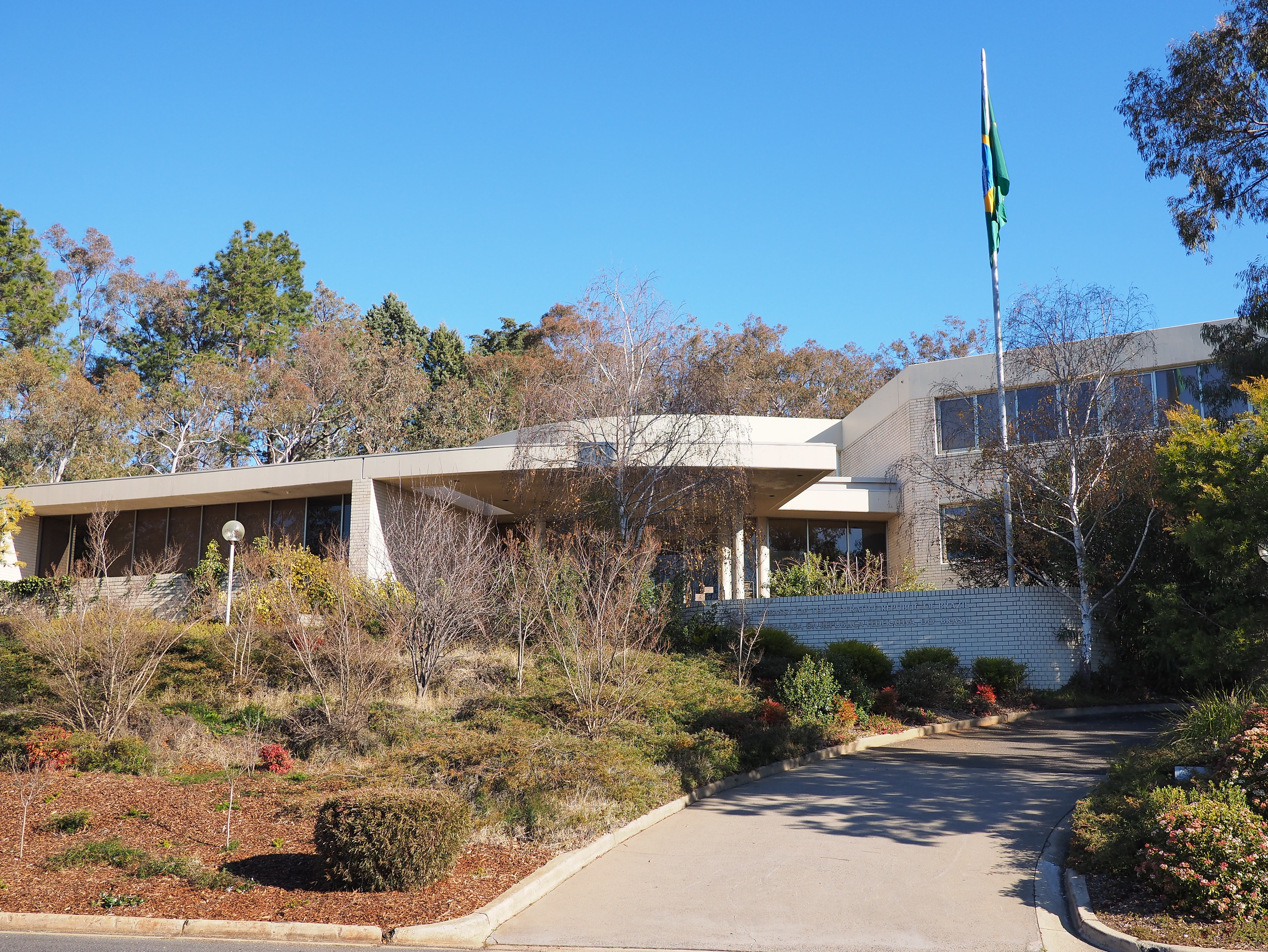
Embassy of Brazil in Canberra

== See also ==
- Australia–Brazil bilateral treaties
- Brazilian Australians
- List of ambassadors of Australia to Brazil
