= Edward Smart =

Australian diplomat and general (1891–1961)

Edward Kenneth Smart
- Born: 23 May 1891; Kew, Victoria
- Died: 2 May 1961 (aged 69)
- Military career
- Allegiance: Australia
- Branch: Australian Army
- Service years: 1910–1946
- Rank: Lieutenant General
- Nickname: Ken
- Commands: Southern Command (1940–42); 3rd Military District (1940–42); Quartermaster General (1939–40); 110th Howitzer Battery (1918)
- Conflicts: First World War; Western Front; Battle of the Somme; Battle of Messines; Second World War
- Awards: Distinguished Service Order; Military Cross; Mentioned in Despatches (2)
- Other work: Australian Consul-General, San Francisco (1946–49); Australian Consul-General, New York (1949–54)

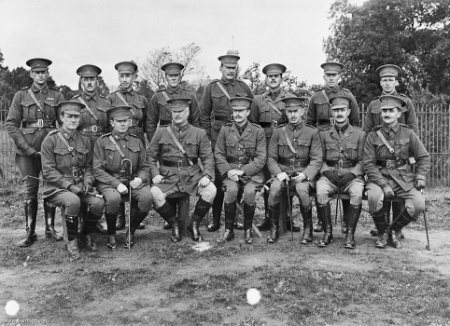
Group portrait of Siege Artillery Brigade officers (SAB), 1914, Melbourne. All of this group embarked on 17 July 1915 on HMAT Orsova (A67) from Melbourne, arriving England 25 August 1915. Back row L-R: Lt HDE Ralfe, Lt HC Bundock, Lt W Tomkinson, Lt Edward Kenneth Smart, Lt C Morris, Lt Basil Morris, Lt PW Dobson, Lt WW Whittle Front row L-R: Capt RW Cohiston-Walsh, Capt AW Bates, Maj FW Osborne, LtCol WA Coxen, Maj JH Hurst, Capt GStJF McDonald, Capt MD Williams

Lieutenant General Edward Kenneth Smart, DSO, MC (23 May 1891 – 2 May 1961) was a career officer in the Australian Army, and subsequently a diplomat. He married twice and his second wife was the Canadian diplomat Margaret Gordon.

== Early years ==
Ken Smart was born 23 May 1891 in Kew, an inner suburb of Melbourne, Australia, and was educated at Melbourne Church of England Grammar School. He was commissioned into the Corps of Australian Engineers as a second lieutenant on 18 July 1910. On 1 December he was promoted to lieutenant in the Royal Australian Garrison Artillery, and by 1914 was an officer of the Siege Artillery Brigade commanded by Lieutenant Colonel Walter Adams Coxen. On 12 June 1915 he married Phyllis E. Robertson.

== Military career ==
=== First World War ===
Smart enlisted in the Australian Imperial Force (AIF) on 21 May 1915, and on 17 July the Siege Artillery Brigade embarked upon HMAT Orsova (A67) from Melbourne, arriving England 25 August.

Smart arrived in France on 2 March 1916, and saw action at Vimy Ridge in May before becoming involved in the Battle of the Somme from June 1916 to March 1917. In September 1916, during the course of heavy fighting in which he was wounded, his actions led to him being awarded the Military Cross. The citation reads:

Lt. Edward Kenneth Smart, R.-Arty. For conspicuous gallantry in action. Although wounded, he observed throughout the day with great courage and skill, sending back valuable information. He has previously done fine work.

On 13 December 1916 he was appointed adjutant of the 36th Heavy Artillery Group (HAG) and promoted to the rank of captain. During 1917 he was placed in command of 39th Battery, 10th Australian Field Artillery Brigade, 4th Australian Division, and saw action in Messines (May–June), near Nieuport (July) and near Dixmude (October). In November 1917 he took a position at headquarters 4th Divisional Artillery as a Brigade-Major Trainee, and in December he was mentioned in despatches.

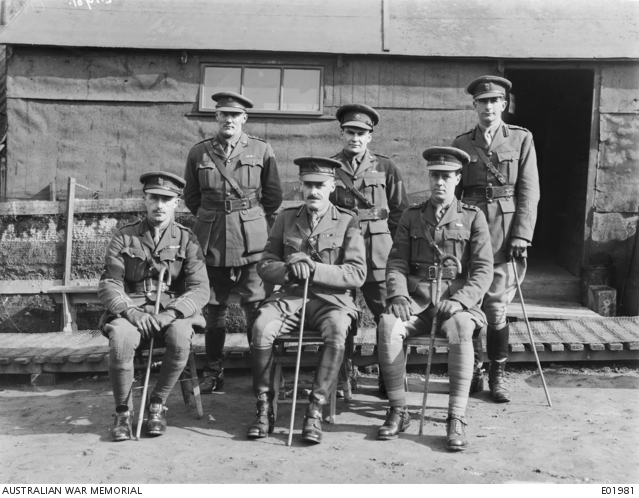
Group portrait of headquarters details of the 4th Australian Divisional Field Artillery, Belgium, March 1918. Stood in the back row on the extreme left is Major E. K. Smart.

In April 1918 Smart took a position at headquarters Australian Corps near Albert, and in June was promoted to brevet major, taking command of the 110th Howitzer Battery, 10th Australian Field Artillery Brigade. Involved in heavy fighting in August and September, he was seriously wounded on 27 September, and subsequently recommended for the Distinguished Service Order.

His service in the First World War resulted in nine entries in the Australian War Memorial's Honours and Awards database:

Award or Recommendation	Date awarded / recommended	Unit	Notes
Awarded: Military Cross	14 November 1916	10th Australian Field Artillery Brigade (FAB)	
Awarded: Mention in Despatches	28 December 1917	4th Division Artillery	
Recommended: Brevet Major	7 May 1918	Royal Australian Garrison Artillery (RAGA)	
Confirmation: Brevet Major	8 May 1918	RAGA	
Recommended: Brevet Major	10 May 1918	RAGA	
Recommended: Brevet Major	10 May 1918	RAGA	
Recommended: Distinguished Service Order	31 January 1919	10th Australian Field Artillery Brigade (FAB)	
Awarded: Distinguished Service Order	3 June 1919	10th FAB	
Awarded: Mention in Despatches	11 July 1919	10th FAB	

=== Inter-bellum ===
After discharge from the AIF, Smart remained in the army and from 31 May to 1 October 1919 attended Artillery College in England. He returned to Australia and, from 16 February to 10 September 1920, served as Officer Commanding No. 6 Company, Royal Australian Garrison Artillery, 3rd Military District in Victoria.

Smart then returned to England until February 1925 where he served in a number of positions:

What	Started	Ended
Gunnery staff Course England	11 September 1920	23 January 1922
Appointed to Staff Corps	1 October 1920	
Promoted to Lieutenant Colonel (brevet) and became a substantive member of Staff Corps	1 May 1921	
Instructor at the Artillery School for Instructors, serving two periods as temporary Chief Instructor	24 January 1922	24 September 1923
CI Arty Schls of Instr (temp.)	1 August 1922	10 December 1922
CI Arty Schls of Instr (temp.)	21 August 1923	30 September 1923
Artillery College & Schools of Artillery England	9 October 1923	8 February 1925

On return to Australia, Smart served in a number of positions until January 1936:

What	Started	Ended
SO "G" Bch AHQ (Army HQ Melb)	9 February 1925	31 March 1929
Comd Base Arty 3 DB (temp)	l/4/1929	29 May 1931
SO Arty 3 DB	30 May 1931	28 February 1933
Instr 2 Svy Coy AGA (officiating) – 2 Survey Coy	1 June 1931	25 October 1931
AA & QMG (QuarterMaster General) & IGC 4 Div	1 October 1932	28 February 1933
DOS (Dir Ordnance Services) AHQ (Army HQ Melb)	1 March 1933	25 November 1935
(Subst) Staff Corps	1 July 1933	31 January 1934
(Subst) Staff Corps	1 February 1934	

On 16 January 1936, Smart took up the position of Military Liaison Officer in the High Commissioner's Office in London, serving there until 25 August 1939, being promoted to brevet colonel in July 1937.

=== Second World War ===
On return to Australia, and the outbreak of the Second World War, on 13 October 1939 Smart was promoted to major general and appointed QuarterMaster General and 3rd Military Member of the Military Board at Army Headquarters in Melbourne. On 24 October 1940 he was promoted to temporary lieutenant general and appointed General Officer Commanding, Southern Command, and District Officer Commanding the 3rd Military District.

In April 1942 he was made substantive lieutenant general and was appointed Australian Military Representative in Washington D.C., or Head of the Australian Military Mission to the United States. In August 1942 he was appointed Australian Army Representative in London; as well as being Head of the Australian Military Mission to the UK, he was Australia's representative on the Imperial War Council. He remained in this position until his retirement from the Australian Army on 2 July 1946.

== Post-military career and personal life ==
From London Smart proceeded to San Francisco where he served as Australian Consul-General from 1946 to 1949, and then to New York, where he continued to serve as Australian Consul-General, from 1946 until his retirement in 1954 to Melbourne with his second wife. He had married the Canadian diplomat Margaret Gordon in 1953.

Smart had first married Phyllis E. Robertson, daughter of Lieutenant Colonel J. Robertson, on 12 June 1915. They had two children; a son and a daughter. Smart's recreations were walking and motoring, and his club was the Navy, Army and Air Force Club in Melbourne. Smart died on 2 May 1961.

== Honours ==
Honours awarded to Ken Smart until 1920:

- Distinguished Service Order
- Military Cross
- 1914–15 Star
- British War Medal
- Victory Medal

Also, Mentioned in Despatches: 28 December 1917 and 11 July 1919

Diplomatic posts
New title	Australian Consul-General in San Francisco; 1946–1949	Succeeded by N.N. Frewin
Preceded by Cedric Kellway	Australian Consul General in New York; 1949–1956	Succeeded by Josiah Francis
