= Marjorie Gordon Smart =

Canadian-Australian diplomat (1911–1982)

- Marjorie Smart, college principal
- Born: Margaret Gordon; 20 May 1911; Winnipeg, Canada
- Died: 23 May 1982 (aged 71); Winnipeg, Canada
- Education: University of Manitoba
- Occupations: British, Canadian and Australian diplomat
- Known for: founding principal of St Hilda's College
- Spouse: E.K.Smart

Marjorie Gordon became Mrs E.K. Smart AM (20 May 1911 – 23 May 1982) was a British, Canadian and Australian diplomat and a founding college principal in Australia.

== Life ==
Smart was born in Winnipeg in 1911. Her father was known as the novelist Ralph Connor, but his real name was the Reverend Dr Charles Gordon. His day job was in the Presbyterian Church in Canada, which he would, in time, lead. Her mother was Helen (born King). Her elder brother was J. King Gordon, and she had five sisters. Her parents had both been to university and she and all of her siblings graduated from the University of Manitoba.

Smart became a civil servant and the secretary to Britain's High Commissioner Malcolm MacDonald until 1946. She then worked for Sir Gordon Munro who worked for the British Treasury. She converted to the Canadian diplomatic service in 1947 after the rules were changed and women were allowed to take the necessary exams. She was sent to work in New York where she was a Canadian vice-consul and a press officer for the Canadian delegation to the United Nations. She resigned that post when she became the second wife of the Australian consul-general, Edward Kenneth Smart DSO, in 1953.

In 1954 her husband retired and after they moved to Melbourne she began to help at the University of Melbourne. In 1961 her husband died and she worked for Australia's Department of Immigration. She made five trips to the UK. In 1963 she became an Australian citizen and in 1964 the University of Melbourne opened St Hilda's College in Melbourne with her as its first Principal. In 1965 she addressed the Country Women's Association annual conference using the name "Mrs E.K.Smart". The Age newspaper reported that she said "a woman's place is not in the home".

She was made a Member of the Order of Australia for her work at the college.

== Death and legacy ==
Smart died in 1982 in Winnipeg. In 2024, the 60th anniversary of the founding of Melbourne's St Hilda's College opened with the "Marjorie Smart Oration".
