= Ian Kennison =

Australian public servant

Ian Kennison CBE

5th Director-General of the Australian Secret Intelligence Service
- In office 8 November 1975 – 10 July 1981
- Prime Minister: Malcolm Fraser
- Preceded by: Bill Robertson
- Succeeded by: John Ryan

Personal details
- Born: 19 December 1920 Melbourne, Victoria, Australia
- Died: May 2000 (aged 79)
- Spouse: Patricia Altorfer (m. 1943)
- Education: Melbourne Church of England Grammar School
- Alma mater: University of Melbourne

Military service
- Allegiance: Australia
- Branch/service: Australian Army
- Years of service: 1939–1946
- Rank: Captain
- Unit: Royal Australian Artillery

Ian James Stodart Kennison CBE (19 December 1920 – May 2000) was an Australian intelligence officer, soldier and public servant, who was Director-General of the Australian Secret Intelligence Service from 1975 to 1981.

== Early life and education ==
Kennison was the son of Mr. and Mrs. G. S. Kennison of Darlinghurst Road, Kings Cross. He was educated at Melbourne Church of England Grammar School, matriculating in 1937 and enrolling at the University of Melbourne. While at Melbourne, he obtained a half-blue in rifle shooting, but did not complete his studies due to the outbreak of World War II.

== Military service ==
Kennison enlisted in the Second Australian Imperial Force (AIF) in 1939, and served as a gunner in Australia and the South West Pacific Area.

In 1943, then at the rank of captain, Kennison was court-martialled over an incident where he was in charge of a country camp of draft recruits. On 19 November 1943, the recruits were moved from one camp to another to be X-rayed, and the prosecution alleged that Kennison has not ensured the supervision of the recruits by himself or other officers, resulting in rowdy behaviour and possible consumption of liquor. In December, the court-martial found Kennison not guilty of the charges of not keeping the camp in a proper state of cleanliness, and not maintaining discipline among the draft.

After the end of the war and in his last year of service, Kennison was involved with organising the war crimes trials on Morotai and Ambon against more than 90 Japanese officers.

== Post-military career ==
Kennison was discharged from the army on 5 April 1946. He returned to Melbourne, where he spent ten years working in the retail sector, eventually managing the drapery and department store Hicks, Atkinson & Sons on Collins Street.

In 1956, Kennison was recruited to the Australian Secret Intelligence Service, having been offered the role in no small part due to his war record and investigative experience during the Morotai and Ambon trials.

In 1976, after twenty years of service with ASIS, Kennison was appointed director-general of the service on the recommendation of Justice Robert Hope, who at the time was conducting a Royal Commission into Australia's intelligence services.
