= List of ambassadors of Australia to Brazil =

Ambassador of Australia to Brazil

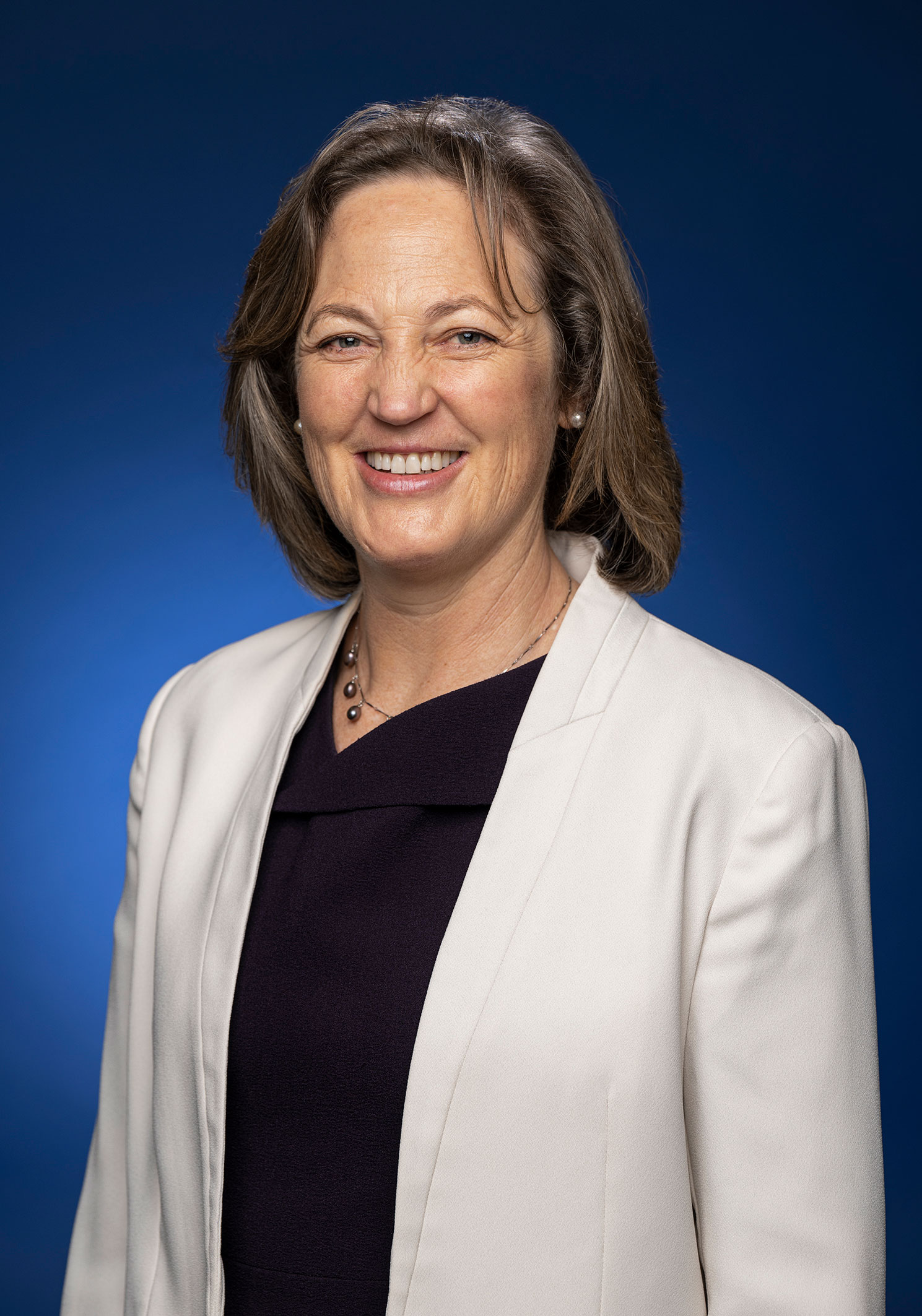
- Incumbent; Sophie Davies since 20 December 2022
- Department of Foreign Affairs and Trade
- Style: His Excellency
- Reports to: Minister for Foreign Affairs
- Residence: Brasília
- Nominator: Prime Minister of Australia
- Appointer: Governor-General of Australia
- Inaugural holder: Lewis Macgregor (as Minister to Brazil)
- Formation: 1945

The Ambassador of Australia to Brazil is an officer of the Australian Department of Foreign Affairs and Trade and the head of the Embassy of the Commonwealth of Australia to the Federative Republic of Brazil. The current Ambassador since December 2022 is Sophie Davies.

== List of heads of mission ==
Ordinal	Officeholder	Title	Term start date	Term end date	Time in office	Notes
1	Lewis Macgregor	Minister to Brazil	1945	1948	2–3 years	
n/a	Torrence Doig	Chargé d'affaires	1948	1950	1–2 years	
2	Peter Heydon	Minister to Brazil	1951	1953	1–2 years	
n/a	John Ryan	Chargé d'affaires	1953	1954	0–1 years	
3	Cedric Kellway	Ambassador of Australia to Brazil	1954	1959	4–5 years	
4	Donald Mackinnon	Ambassador of Australia to Brazil	1959	1960	0–1 years	
5	Stewart Wolfe Jamieson	Ambassador of Australia to Brazil	1960	1962	1–2 years	
5	Owen Davis	Ambassador of Australia to Brazil	1962	1964	1–2 years	
n/a	Rodney Hodgson	Chargé d'affaires	1964	1965	0–1 years	
6	John McMillan	Ambassador of Australia to Brazil	1965	1971	5–6 years	
7	Frederick Homer	Ambassador of Australia to Brazil	1971	1974	2–3 years	
8	John Kelso	Ambassador of Australia to Brazil	1974	1978	3–4 years	
9	Rudolph Schneemann	Ambassador of Australia to Brazil	1978	1981	2–3 years	
10	Bruce Woodberry	Ambassador of Australia to Brazil	1981	1985	3–4 years	
11	Warwick Weemaes	Ambassador of Australia to Brazil	1985	1988	2–3 years	
12	Warwick Pearson	Ambassador of Australia to Brazil	1988	1992	3–4 years	
13	Alan Thomas	Ambassador of Australia to Brazil	1992	1995	2–3 years	
14	Charles Mott	Ambassador of Australia to Brazil	1995	1998	2–3 years	
15	Garry Conroy	Ambassador of Australia to Brazil	1998	2002	3–4 years	
16	John Sullivan	Ambassador of Australia to Brazil	2002	2005	2–3 years	
17	Peter Heyward	Ambassador of Australia to Brazil	2005	2008	2–3 years	
18	Neil Mules	Ambassador of Australia to Brazil	2008	2011	2–3 years	
19	Brett Hackett	Ambassador of Australia to Brazil	2011	February 2014	2–3 years	
20	Patrick Lawless	Ambassador of Australia to Brazil	February 2014	February 2016	2 years	
21	John Richardson	Ambassador of Australia to Brazil	February 2016	September 2018	2 years, 7 months	
22	Tim Kane	Ambassador of Australia to Brazil	November 2018	December 2022	4 years, 1 month	
23	Sophie Davies	Ambassador of Australia to Brazil	December 2022	incumbent	3 years, 9 months	

== See also ==
- Australia–Brazil relations
