= John Ryan (diplomat) =

Australian diplomat and public servant

John Ryan OBE

Director-General of the Australian Secret Intelligence Service
- In office 5 October 1981 – 21 December 1983
- Preceded by: Ian Kennison
- Succeeded by: Jim Furner

Personal details
- Born: John Edmund Ryan; 13 March 1923 Bondi, New South Wales, Australia
- Died: 9 February 1987 (aged 63) Canberra, Australian Capital Territory, Australia
- Spouse: Patricia Wall (m. 1950)
- Education: University of Melbourne

Military service
- Allegiance: Australia
- Branch/service: Australian Army
- Years of service: 1942–1946
- Rank: Lieutenant
- Unit: 2/7th Independent Company; 2/12th Battalion
- Battles/wars: Battle of Balikpapan (1945)

John Edmund Ryan OBE (13 March 1923 – 9 February 1987) was an Australian diplomat and public servant.

== Early life, education and military service ==
Ryan was born in Bondi, Sydney in 1923. He was educated in Canberra at St Christopher's School, and later attended St Patrick's College, Goulburn on a bursary. He enrolled at the University of Sydney in 1941, but only completed the first year of an arts degree before enlisting in the Second Australian Imperial Force on 9 January 1942. He served as a corporal with the 2/7th Independent Company in New Guinea until March 1943 when he was selected for officer training at the Royal Military College, Duntroon. Due to the war, he completed a shortened version of the training, during which he was injured in a transport accident.

== Diplomatic career ==
Ryan was discharged from the AIF in 1946, and later that year, joined the Department of External Affairs. He served as High Commissioner to Ghana (1965–67) and Ambassador to Laos (1968–69), then Ambassador to Italy (1974–77) and High Commissioner to Canada (1977–80).

== Public service ==
In 1980, Ryan returned to Canberra and became deputy secretary of the Department of Foreign Affairs. In October 1981, he was appointed acting Director-General of the Australian Secret Intelligence Service. In late 1983, a bungled ASIS training exercise known as the Sheraton Hotel incident occurred, in which armed ASIS officers conducted a mock hostage rescue in a Melbourne hotel without the knowledge or permission of the hotel management or Victoria Police. Ryan resigned from ASIS in December 1983, and the incident was reviewed by the second Hope Royal Commission, which criticised Ryan and his role in the operation. He retired from the public service in May 1984.

Ryan died of lymphoma on 9 February 1987 in Canberra.

Diplomatic posts
Preceded by Peter Heydon	Australian Minister to Brazil; Chargé d'affaires 1953–1954	Succeeded by Cedric Kellway as Ambassador to Brazil
Preceded by Barrie Dexter as Acting High Commissioner	Australian High Commissioner to Ghana; 1965–1967	Succeeded by Richard Woolcott
Preceded by Barrie Dexter	Australian Ambassador to Laos; 1968–1969	Succeeded by Peter Curtis
Preceded by Malcolm Booker	Australian Ambassador to Italy; 1974–1977	Succeeded by R.H. Robertson
Preceded by Max Loveday	Australian High Commissioner to Canada; 1977–1980	Succeeded by Barrie Dexter
Government offices
Preceded by Ian Kennison	Director-General of the Australian Secret Intelligence Service; 1981–1983	Succeeded by Jim Furner
