= David Irvine (diplomat) =

Australian diplomat (1947–2022)

David Irvine AO
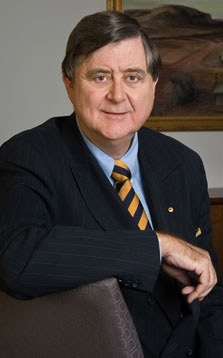

12th Director-General of Security
- In office 30 March 2009 – 14 September 2014
- Prime Minister: Kevin Rudd; Julia Gillard; Tony Abbott
- Preceded by: Paul O'Sullivan
- Succeeded by: Duncan Lewis

10th Director-General of the Australian Secret Intelligence Service
- In office 1 March 2003 – 27 March 2009
- Prime Minister: John Howard; Kevin Rudd
- Preceded by: Allan Taylor
- Succeeded by: Nick Warner

Personal details
- Born: 10 January 1947 Perth, Western Australia
- Died: 30 March 2022 (aged 75) Canberra, Australian Capital Territory
- Education: University of Western Australia
- Occupation: Diplomat

David Taylor Irvine, AO (10 January 1947 – 30 March 2022) was an Australian diplomat who, from March 2009 to September 2014, was the Director-General of Security, the head of the Australian Security Intelligence Organisation (ASIO). Prior to his appointment to ASIO, he was Director-General of the Australian Secret Intelligence Service (ASIS) from 2003 to 2009. In 2017 he was appointed Chair of the Foreign Investment Review Board.

== Education and career ==
Irvine was born in Perth, Western Australia, and studied at Hale School and the University of Western Australia, graduating with honours in Elizabethan history. He worked as a journalist in Perth, and joined the Department of External Affairs (the Australian foreign service) in 1970, and serving as a diplomat in Rome (1970–1973) later in Jakarta (1976–1980). Other diplomatic appointments included postings as a Counsellor (later Minister) in Beijing (1982–1986) and Minister in Jakarta (1988–1990). In 1996 to 1999 Irvine served as Australian High Commissioner to Papua New Guinea, and was Australian Ambassador to China from 2000 to 2003.

Irvine wrote two books about Indonesia: a 1990 English translation of Bisma: Warrior Priest of the Mahabharata by Satyagraha Hurip, and Leather Gods & Wooden Heroes: Java's Classical Wayang (1996; about Indonesian Wayang shadow puppets).

Irvine died in Canberra on 30 March 2022 after a period of illness and a stroke, aged 75.

== Honours ==
Irvine was appointed an Officer of the Order of Australia in June 2005.

Diplomatic posts
Preceded by Bill Farmer	Australian High Commissioner to Papua New Guinea; 1996–1999	Succeeded by Nick Warner
Preceded by Ric Smith	Australian Ambassador to China; 2000–2003	Succeeded by Alan Thomas
Government offices
Preceded by Allan Taylor	Director-General of the Australian Secret Intelligence Service; 2003–2009	Succeeded by Nick Warner
Preceded by Paul O'Sullivan	Director-General of Security; 2009–2014	Succeeded by Duncan Lewis
