= Frances Margaret McGuire =

Australian assistant biochemist, writer and Catholic social thinker

- Born: Frances Margaret Cheadle; 20 May 1900; Glenelg, South Australia, Australia
- Died: 14 August 1995 (aged 95); North Adelaide, South Australia, Australia
- Occupations: Author, philanthropist, Catholic lay leader
- Years active: 1930s-1995
- Known for: Co-founder of Catholic Guild for Social Studies, Adelaide
- Notable work: The Royal Australian Navy
- Spouse: Dominic Mary Paul McGuire
- Parent(s): Alfred S. and Margaret Cheadle
- Awards: Member of the Order of Australia

Frances Margaret McGuire AM (1900–1995) was an Australian Catholic author, biochemist, community leader and philanthropist. She was a co-founder of the Catholic Guild for Social Studies in Adelaide, South Australia in 1932, and served as the director of studies for the organisation for sixteen years. She authored or co-authored more than ten books, including a handbook for Catholic Action groups, and a history of the Royal Australian Navy. She was appointed AM in 1995 at the Queen's birthday honours.

== Biography ==
Frances Margaret Cheadle was born on 20 May 1900 in Glenelg, South Australia. Her parents were Alfred Stanley and Margaret Cheadle; she was one of five children. Her father was the former mayor of St Peters, New South Wales, and a successful wool merchant. Cheadle attended the Girton House Girls’ Grammar School and then attended classes the University of Adelaide, where she studied life sciences. From 1923 to 1924, she worked in the laboratory of Thorburn Brailsford Robertson, a biochemist and professor at the University of Adelaide. Cheadle assisted him in his work developing an improved method of delivering insulin. Sometime around 1923 Robertson gained the approval of Banting and Best for her to prepare a batch of insulin to treat Clifford Cornish, a sufferer from diabetes, who went on to enjoy another 30 years of life.

In 1927, Cheadle married Dominic Mary Paul McGuire, a Navy office and diplomat. She converted to Catholicism, and became involved in Catholic literary and social action endeavors. She contributed to The Southern Cross, a Catholic weekly published in Adelaide. She and her husband moved to London, England from 1929 to 1932, returning to Adelaide in 1932. They were active in Catholic intellectual circles in London, and were supporters of the newly developing Catholic Action movement.

Upon their return, the McGuires co-founded the Catholic Guild for Social Studies in Adelaide in 1932, and helped establish the Catholic Central Library. Frances Margaret McGuire became the director of studies for the guild, and would remain in this role for sixteen years. She lectured frequently, and produced a handbook for use by Catholic Action groups in 1939. She joined the National Council of Women of Australia and served on the executive board. In 1939, she attended the League of Nations meeting in Geneva, as a delegate for the group. McGuire also completed three tours of the United States, in 1939, 1940 and 1949. During her trips, she gave lectures and met with Catholic women's groups and other faith-based organizations working on social welfare. McGuire resigned her post as director of studies in 1948, over a dispute relating to Catholic organization's affiliation with political parties.

McGuire authored several books, including novels, books of poetry, a history of the Royal Australian Navy and a memoir about her childhood, entitled Bright Morning. She also assisted her husband in his scholarly work, and co-authored with him three books, including a history of the Australian Theatre. She travelled with her husband for his diplomatic postings, to Dublin in 1953, and then to Italy, where Paul McGuire served as Australia's minister and then ambassador from 1954 to 1959. The couple returned home to Australia at the end of this appointment. McGuire continued writing and was a generous supporter of the South Australia State library, until her death. She was appointed a Member of the Order of Australia at the Queen's Birthday Honours on 12 June 1995, in recognition of "service to the community and to literature, particularly through the state library of South Australia."

The McGuires had no living children; two children were stillborn. Paul McGuire died in 1978. Frances Margaret McGuire died on 14 August 1995, in North Adelaide. She is buried in Brighton, Adelaide, South Australia.

== Works ==
- Handbook for Catholic Action Groups (1939)
- The Royal Australian Navy (1948)
- Gardens of Italy
- Bright Morning (1975)

with Paul McGuire

- The Price of Admiralty (1945)
- The Australian Theatre (1948)
- Inns of Australia (1952)
