= Donald Mackinnon (diplomat) =

Australian public servant and diplomat

Donald Mackinnon CBE
- Born: 30 April 1892; Prahran, Victoria, Australia
- Died: 2 May 1965 (aged 73); Terang, Victoria, Australia
- Occupations: Public servant, diplomat
- Spouse: Mary Hindle James (m. 1927)

Donald Mackinnon CBE (30 April 1892 – 2 May 1965) was an Australian public servant and diplomat.

Diplomatic posts
Preceded by Cedric Kellway	Australian Ambassador to Brazil; 1959–1960	Succeeded by Stewart Wolfe Jamieson
