= Consul-General of Australia in New York =

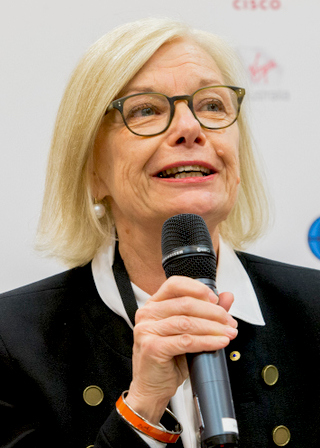
- Incumbent; Heather Ridout since 20 December 2022
- Department of Foreign Affairs and Trade
- Style: Her Excellency
- Reports to: Ambassador of Australia to the United States
- Residence: Beekman Place, Manhattan
- Nominator: Prime Minister of Australia
- Appointer: Governor General of Australia
- Inaugural holder: Cedric Kellway
- Formation: 14 November 1945
- Website: Australian Consulate-General, New York

The consul-general of Australia in New York represents the Australian Government in New York City.

The consulate-general is responsible for raising awareness of Asia-Pacific issues in the United States through contacts with New York–based media, think tanks, educational institutions and cultural organisations. The consulate provides consular and passport services, as well as visiting and reporting responsibilities on behalf of the Australian ambassador in Washington, in the jurisdictions of New York, New Jersey, Pennsylvania, Connecticut, Rhode Island, Massachusetts, Vermont, Maine, New Hampshire, Ohio, Puerto Rico and the US Virgin Islands.

== Consuls-general ==
Name	Start of term	End of term	References
Cedric Kellway	14 November 1945	1949	
Edward Smart	October 1949	1956	
Josiah Francis	March 1956	1961	
Roden Cutler	August 1961	1966	
Reginald Sholl	February 1966	1968	
Francis Murray (acting)	31 December 1968	10 August 1970	
John Bates	August 1970	1973	
John Wilton	August 1973	1975	
Peter Barbour	December 1975	1978	
Bob Cotton	July 1978	1982	
Denis Cordner	March 1982	1984	
John Taylor	August 1984	1988	
Chris Hurford	March 1988	1992	
Peter Curtis	February 1992	1994	
Jim Humphreys	September 1994	1996	
Michael Baume	October 1996	2001	
Ken Allen	August 2001	2006	
John Olsen	March 2006	2009	
Phil Scanlan	April 2009	2013	
Steve Bracks	August 2013	September 2013	
Nick Minchin	February 2014	31 May 2017	
Alastair Walton	23 June 2017	17 February 2021	
Nick Greiner	18 February 2021	20 December 2022	
Heather Ridout	20 December 2022	Incumbent	

== See also ==
- Australia–United States relations
- Embassy of Australia, Washington, D.C.
- List of ambassadors of Australia to the United States
- Embassy of the United States, Canberra
- List of ambassadors of the United States to Australia
- List of diplomatic missions in the United States
- List of diplomatic missions of Australia
