= Allan Taylor (diplomat) =

Australian diplomat

Allan Taylor AM

9th Director-General of the Australian Secret Intelligence Service
- In office 1 March 1998 – 28 February 2003
- Prime Minister: John Howard
- Preceded by: Rex Stevenson
- Succeeded by: David Irvine

Personal details
- Born: 23 August 1941 Wynyard, Tasmania
- Died: 19 July 2007 (aged 65)
- Spouse: Carol
- Education: University of Tasmania; University of Oxford
- Occupation: Diplomat

Allan Robert Taylor AM (23 August 1941 – 19 June 2007) was an Australian diplomat, best known for his service as Director-General of the Australian Secret Intelligence Service from 1998 to 2003.

== Early life and education ==
Taylor was born in Wynyard, Tasmania, and spent his childhood in various Tasmanian towns before boarding at Launceston Church Grammar School. He graduated with a Bachelor of Arts in Modern History from the University of Tasmania. He then studied as Tasmania's 1963 Rhodes scholar at the University of Oxford, where he received a Master of Arts in History in 1965. His studies led to an interest in diplomacy, and in 1966 he joined the Department of External Affairs, Australia's foreign service.

== Diplomatic career ==
Taylor's early postings were to Pakistan and Thailand. After a posting in Canberra, he was sent to Jakarta to serve as political counsellor for the Australian Embassy. His first posting as head of a consular station was as High Commissioner to Nigeria from 1983 to 1985. From 1989 to 1993, he was High Commissioner to Papua New Guinea. In 1994 he returned to Jakarta as Australian Ambassador to Indonesia. Taylor was appointed a Member of the Order of Australia in 1995 for his "service to international relations".

== Australian Secret Intelligence Service ==
Taylor was Director-General of the Australian Secret Intelligence Service from 1998 to 2003.

Diplomatic posts
| Preceded by H.C. Mott | Australian High Commissioner to Nigeria; 1983–1985 | Succeeded by R.H. Wyndham |
| Preceded by Lance Joseph | Australian High Commissioner to Papua New Guinea; 1989–1993 | Succeeded by Bill Farmer |
| Preceded by Philip Flood | Australian Ambassador to Indonesia; 1993–1996 | Succeeded by John McCarthy |
Government offices
| Preceded by Rex Stevenson | Director-General of the Australian Secret Intelligence Service; 1998–2003 | Succeeded by David Irvine |
