= Rex Stevenson =

Rex Stevenson AO

8th Director-General of the Australian Secret Intelligence Service
- In office 9 December 1992 – 28 February 1998
- Preceded by: Jim Furner
- Succeeded by: Allan Taylor

Personal details
- Born: Rex Kenneth Stevenson; 16 October 1942 (age 83) Melbourne, Victoria, Australia
- Spouse: Caroline Schoning (m. 1969)
- Education: Monash University
- Occupation: Intelligence officer

Rex Kenneth Stevenson AO (born 16 October 1942) is an Australian company director and former intelligence officer, who was the Director-General of the Australian Secret Intelligence Service from 1992 to 1998.

Born in Melbourne, Stevenson attended Northcote High School, and then studied a Bachelor of Arts with Honours and a Master of Arts at Monash University. His 1970 masters thesis, Cultivators and administrators: British educational policy towards the Malays, 1875–1906, was published as a book by Oxford University Press in 1975.

Stevenson began his career as an intelligence officer in 1973, and by 1990 he was the Deputy Director-General of the Australian Secret Intelligence Service (ASIS). On 25 November 1992, he was promoted to acting Director-General and was officially appointed to the role two weeks later on 9 December.

After his retirement from ASIS in 1998, Stevenson co-founded the security consulting firms Signet Group and Spectrum Consultancy.

Government offices
Preceded by Jim Furner	Director-General of the Australian Secret Intelligence Service; 1992–1998	Succeeded by Allan Taylor
