= Jim Furner =

Brigadier Jim Furner AO, CBE, DSM

Director-General of the Australian Secret Intelligence Service
- In office 27 February 1984 – 24 November 1992
- Prime Minister: Bob Hawke; Paul Keating
- Preceded by: John Ryan
- Succeeded by: Rex Stevenson

Personal details
- Born: 25 November 1927 Warragul, Victoria
- Died: 17 September 2007 (aged 79) Terrigal, New South Wales
- Spouse: Lois Walker (m. 1952)
- Education: University of Melbourne

Military service
- Allegiance: Australia
- Branch/service: Australian Army
- Years of service: 1952–1982
- Rank: Brigadier
- Commands: Australian Army Intelligence Centre (1969–70)
- Battles/wars: Vietnam War
- Awards: Officer of the Order of Australia; Commander of the Order of the British Empire; Distinguished Service Medal

Brigadier James Osmond Furner, AO, CBE, DSM (25 November 1927 – 17 September 2007) was an Australian military intelligence officer, who was the longest serving Director-General of the Australian Secret Intelligence Service (ASIS) from 1984 to 1992.

== Military career ==
After completing a Bachelor of Arts degree at the University of Melbourne and working as a school teacher, Furner embarked on a career change and enlisted in the Australian Army, becoming one of the first cadets to be trained at the Officer Cadet School, Portsea. On completion of his training, Furner joined the Royal Australian Infantry Corps where he was posted overseas with the 1st Commonwealth Division in South Korea from 1955 to 1956.

In 1982, Furner joined the Joint Intelligence Organisation as deputy director, and retired from the army to take the civilian post of director a few months later.

== Australian Secret Intelligence Service ==
In February 1984, Minister for Foreign Affairs, Bill Hayden, asked Furner to take the role of Director-General of the Australian Secret Intelligence Service in an acting capacity. The appointment was made permanent in late July 1985 and Furner served in the role until November 1992.

Government offices
Preceded by John Ryan	Director-General of the Australian Secret Intelligence Service; 1984–1992	Succeeded by Rex Stevenson
Preceded by Arthur McMichael	Director of the Joint Intelligence Organisation; 1982–1984	Succeeded by G. Marshall
