= Sophie Davies =

Australian diplomat

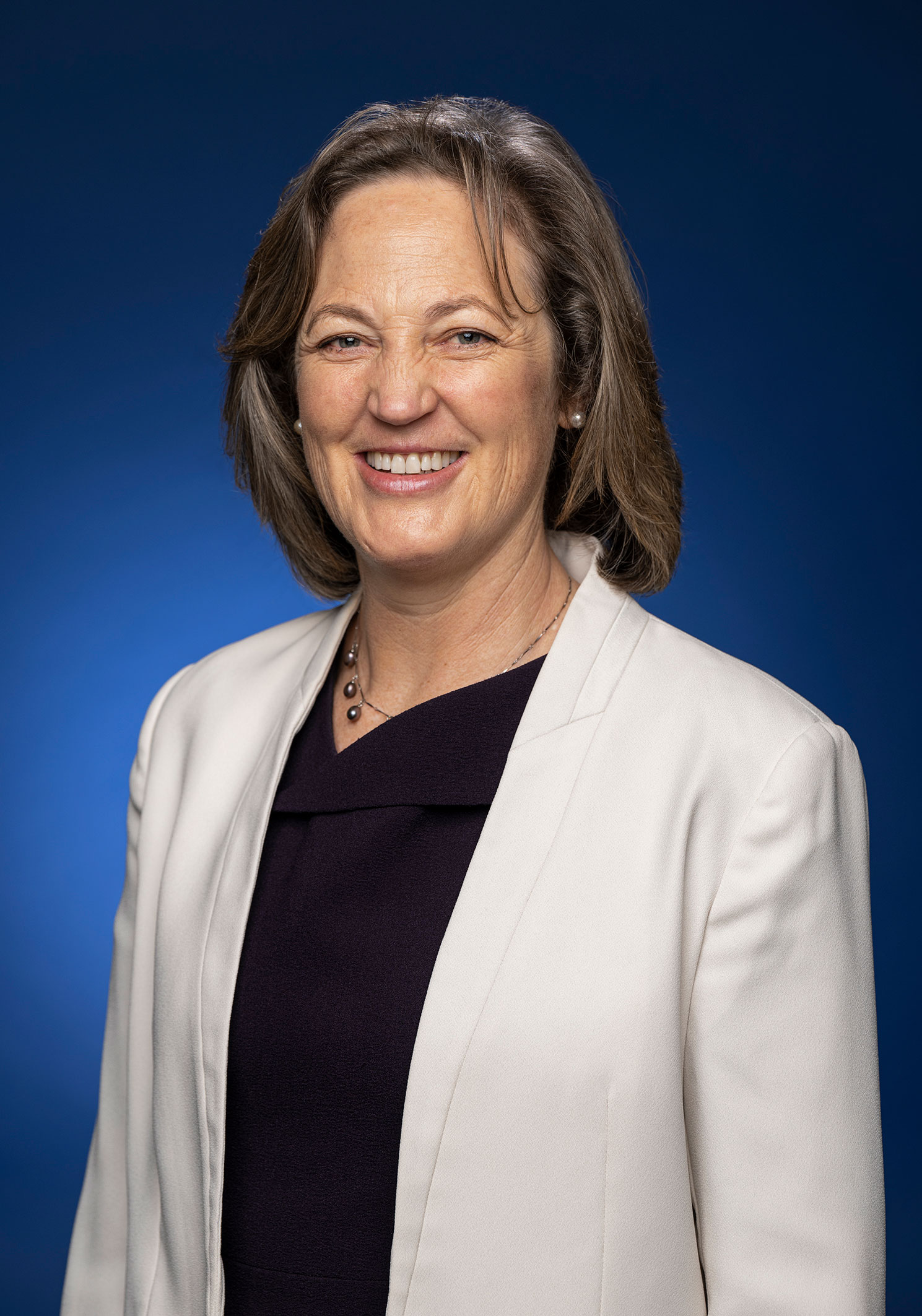

Sophie Davies is an Australian diplomat and was appointed as Australian Ambassador to Brazil in December of 2022. She had previously been Ambassador to Colombia from June 2017 to December 2020, the first Australian ambassador in the new embassy in Bogotá. She is a career diplomat with the Department of Foreign Affairs and Trade (DFAT). She previously served as its Deputy Head of Mission of the Australian Embassy in Lima, Peru.

Davies studied Bachelor of Economics/Laws from the University of Sydney and earned her Masters of Evaluation from the University of Melbourne, Masters of Social Science from the Royal Melbourne Institute of Technology.
