= Nick Warner =

Australian diplomat and public servant

Nick Warner AO, PSM
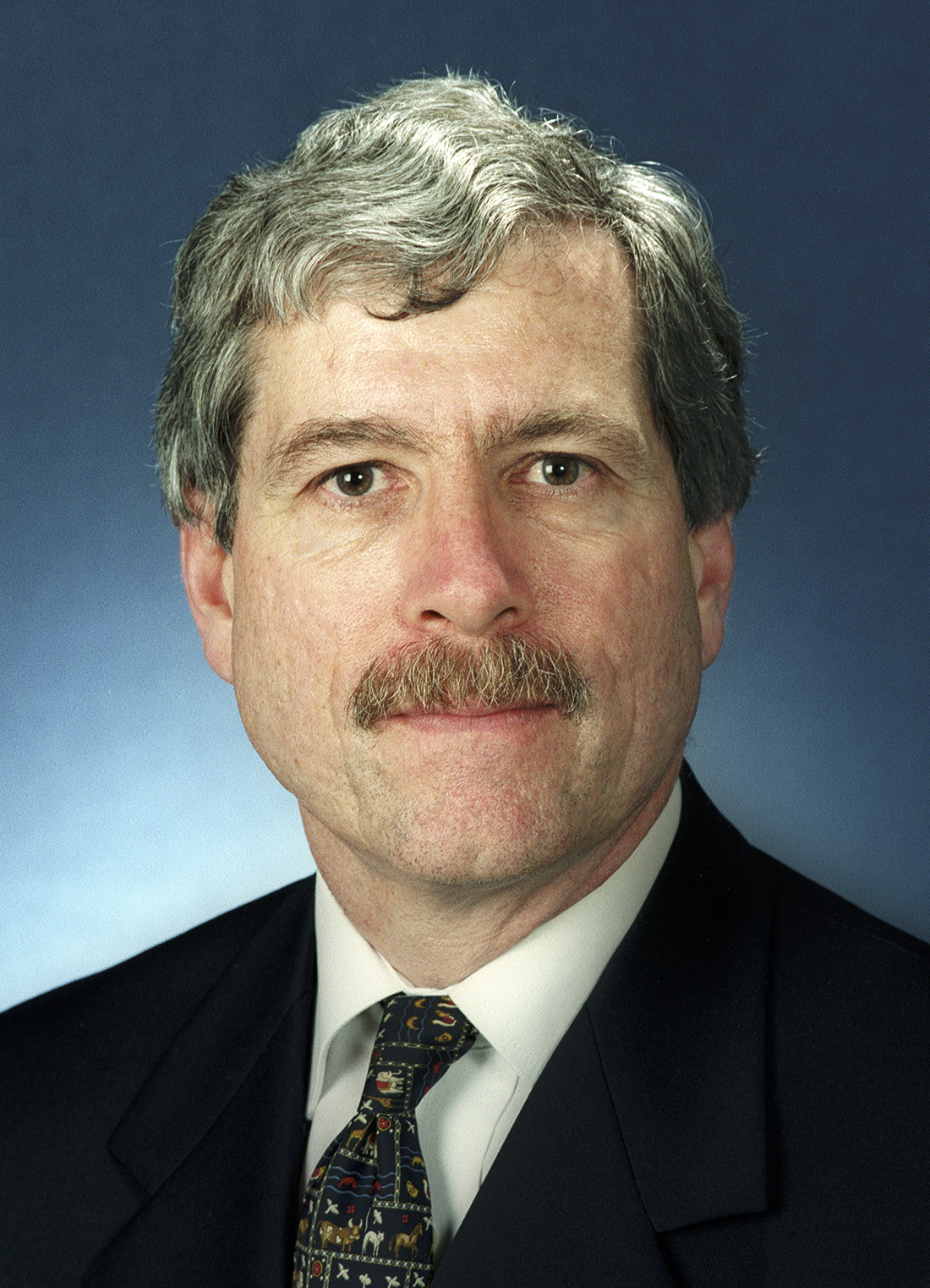

11th Director-General of the Australian Secret Intelligence Service
- In office 17 August 2009 – 18 December 2017
- Preceded by: David Irvine
- Succeeded by: Paul Symon

Secretary of the Department of Defence
- In office 4 December 2006 – 14 August 2009
- Preceded by: Ric Smith
- Succeeded by: Ian Watt

Personal details
- Born: Nicholas Peter Warner; 22 May 1950 (age 76) Colony of Singapore
- Parent: Denis Warner
- Education: Australian National University (BA, MA)
- Occupation: Public servant, diplomat

Nicholas Peter Warner, AO, PSM (born 22 May 1950) is a former Australian diplomat, intelligence official and public servant.

Warner was the Director-General of the Office of National Intelligence (ONI) from December 2018 until December 2020. He also served as the director-general of the precursor agency to ONI, the Office of National Assessments, from December 2017 to December 2018.

Prior to that, Warner served as the director-general Australian Secret Intelligence Service (ASIS) from August 2009 to December 2017, and the secretary of the Australian Department of Defence from December 2006 to August 2009.

== Education ==
Born in the Colony of Singapore, Warner holds a Bachelor of Arts degree with honours in history and Asian studies and a Master of Arts degree in history from the Australian National University (ANU).

== Career ==
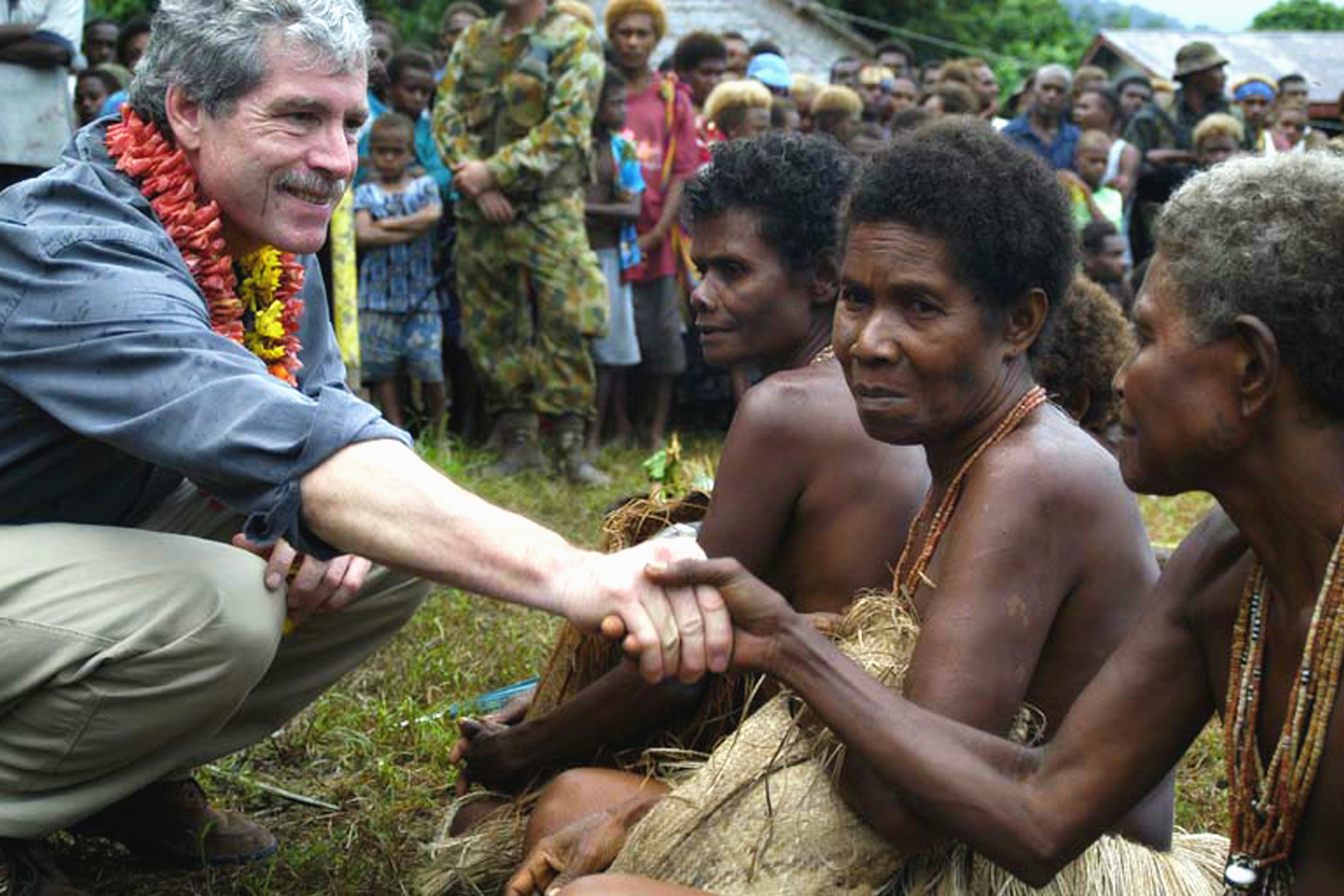
Nick Warner greeting Solomon Islands women while serving as Special Coordinator of the Regional Assistance Mission to Solomon Islands

Joint Intelligence Organisation (JIO):

- (1973–77) Worked in the JIO

Office of National Assessments (ONA):

- (1979–88), Deputy head, Current Intelligence Branch and National Assessments Officer for Africa
- (1980) Australian Liaison Office, Salisbury, Rhodesia

Department of Foreign Affairs and Trade (DFAT):

- (1988–89) Director, South Asia, Africa, Middle East Trade Section
- (1989–90) Head, Australian Liaison Office, Namibia during the Australian contribution to UNTAG
- (1990–91) Director, Central and Southern Africa Section
- (1991–93) Deputy head of mission, Australian Permanent Mission to the Supreme National Council, Cambodia
- (1994–97) Australian ambassador to Iran
- (1997–98) Assistant secretary, Parliamentary and Media Branch and Senior Spokesman
- (1997–98) Acting first assistant secretary, Public Affairs and Consular Division
- (1998–99) First assistant secretary, South and South East Asia Division
- (1999–2003) High commissioner, Papua New Guinea
- (2003) First assistant secretary, South Pacific, Africa and Middle East Division
- (2003–2004) Special coordinator of the Regional Assistance Mission to Solomon Islands (RAMSI)
- (2004–2005) Deputy secretary, Department of Foreign Affairs and Trade

Prime Minister's Office (PMO):

- (2005–2006) Senior adviser (International) to the prime minister

Australian Department of Defence:

- (4 December 2006 – August 2009) Secretary of Defence

Department of Foreign Affairs and Trade (DFAT):

- (17 August 2009 – 18 December 2017) Director-general, Australian Secret Intelligence Service (ASIS)

Department of the Prime Minister and Cabinet (PM&C):

- (18 December 2017 – 20 December 2018) Director-general of the Office of National Assessments (ONA)
- (20 December 2018–) Director-General of the Office of National Intelligence (ONI)

== Honours ==
Warner was awarded the Public Service Medal in 2006 for outstanding public service as High Commissioner to Port Moresby, Special Coordinator for the Regional Assistance Mission to Solomon Islands and leader of the Emergency Response Team which dealt with the kidnapping in Baghdad of Mr Douglas Wood. On 13 June 2011, he was named an Officer of the Order of Australia for distinguished service to public sector leadership through the development of policy, administration and reform in the areas of intelligence, defence and international relations.

== References and notes ==
Diplomatic posts
Preceded by John Oliver	Ambassador of Australia to Iran; 1994–1997	Succeeded by Stuart Hume
Preceded by David Irvine	High Commissioner of Australia to Papua New Guinea; 1999–2003	Succeeded by Michael Potts
Government offices
Preceded by Ric Smith	Secretary of the Department of Defence; 2006–2009	Succeeded by Ian Watt
Preceded by David Irvine	Director-General of the Australian Secret Intelligence Service; 2009–2017	Succeeded by Paul Symon
Preceded by Richard Maude	Director-General of the Office of National Assessments; 2017–present	Incumbent
