= Paul Symon =

Australian major-general (b.1960)

Major General Paul Symon AO
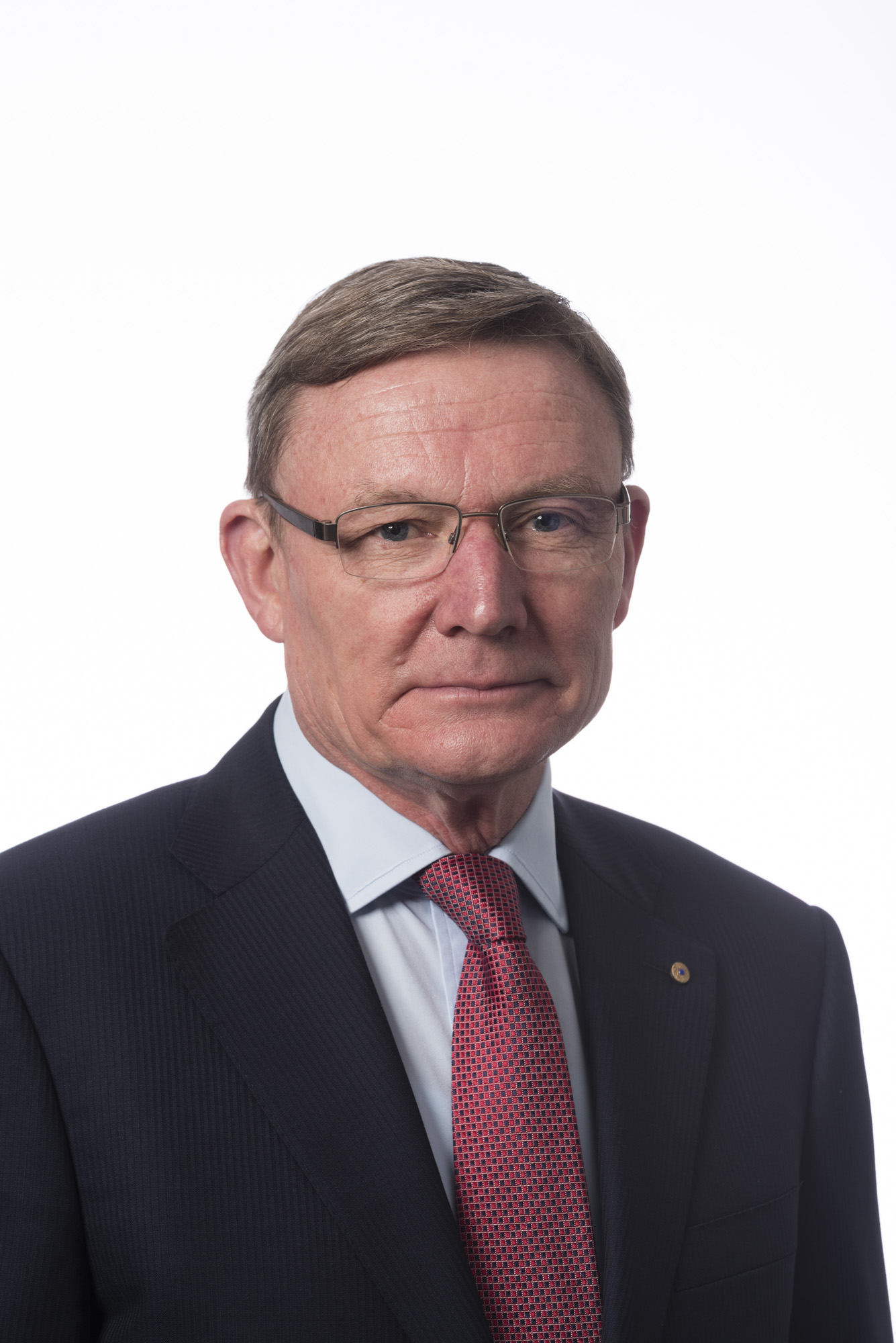

12th Director-General of the Australian Secret Intelligence Service
- In office 18 December 2017 – 20 February 2023
- Preceded by: Nick Warner
- Succeeded by: Kerri Hartland

Personal details
- Born: January 1, 1960 (age 66) Melbourne, Victoria, Australia
- Children: 2
- Education: Royal Military College, Duntroon; Deakin University, University of New South Wales (MA, MS)
- Occupation: Australian Army officer Public servant Intelligence Officer

Military service
- Allegiance: Australia
- Branch/service: Australian Army
- Years of service: 1979–2015
- Rank: Major General
- Commands: Defence Intelligence Organisation (2011–14); Deputy Chief of Army (2009–11); Joint Task Force 633 (2005–06); 1st Regiment, Royal Australian Artillery (1998–99)
- Battles/wars: East Timor; Iraq War; War in Afghanistan
- Awards: Officer of the Order of Australia; Group Bravery Citation

Major General Paul Bruce Symon, AO (born 1960) is a retired senior Australian Army officer and public servant. He served as Deputy Chief of Army from 2009 to 2011, Director of the Defence Intelligence Organisation from 2011 to 2014 and, following his retirement from the army, was Director-General of the Australian Secret Intelligence Service from 18 December 2017 to 20 February 2023.

== Early life and academics ==
Symon was born on 1 January 1960, in Melbourne, Victoria. He was educated at Scotch College, Melbourne, and entered the Royal Military College, Duntroon, as an Australian Army officer cadet in 1979.

Academically, Symon holds two Master's degrees in the Arts and Defence Studies from Deakin University and from the University of New South Wales respectively. He is a graduate of Australian Command and Staff College and the Centre for Defence and Strategic Studies in Canberra.

== Military career ==
After entering the Royal Military College, Duntroon in 1979, he was allotted to Kokoda Company. In his final year at Duntroon in 1982 he was the senior cadet – Battalion Sergeant Major – and graduated as the recipient of the Sword of Honour. Symon was allotted to the Royal Regiment of Australian Artillery (RAA) and over his career saw service with the gunners in many postings, culminating in command of the 1st Field Regiment, Royal Australian Artillery in 1998 to 1999.

Symon served on four operational deployments. His most important joint command was in late 2005 until mid-2006 when appointed Commander Middle East (Joint Task Force 633). This appointment gave him national command responsibility for all Australian soldiers, sailors and airmen/women in Iraq and Afghanistan. His command coincided with Australia's only death in Iraq, that of Private Jake Kovco.

Symon advised the United Nations Special Representative in East Timor in the four months prior to the deployment of International Force for East Timor, known as INTERFET. This entailed close liaison with the Indonesian military, Falintil and militia leaders prior to, during, and after the vote for independence in 1999. For his leadership in East Timor and in command, he was appointed a Member of the Order of Australia in the 2000 Birthday Honours.

In 1997 he served with the United Nations Truce Supervision Organization in a period of great tension between Hezbollah and the Israeli Defence Force. And in 2003, he was appointed as the senior military adviser for the Regional Assistance Mission to Solomon Islands It was in this period that a significant number of militia leaders were jailed and a very successful gun amnesty organised.

Symon has taught at the Royal Military Academy Sandhurst in the UK, and has served as Army's Director-General of Personnel, Director-General of Preparedness and Plans and Deputy Chief of Army. He has also served as Director-General Pacific in International Policy Division and Chief of Staff of Army's 1st Division in Brisbane.

Symon was appointed an Officer of the Order of Australia in the 2007 Australia Day Honours in recognition of his operational service in the Middle East.

== Intelligence career ==
Symon left his role as Deputy Chief of Army and joined the Department of Foreign Affairs and Trade. He was subsequently appointed as Director of Defence Intelligence Organisation (DIO), where he served from 2011-2014. He oversaw the organisation on foreign military capabilities, intentions, and strategics to information to give to Australian defence policy and operations. Symon officially left the Military in 2015 and became the Director-General of the Australian Secret Intelligence Service from 18 December 2017.

Controversies about the ASIS's 2004 bugging operation in East Timor resurfaced during Symon's tenure, the prosecution of lawyer Bernard Collaery and former officer “Witness K” drew criticism for secrecy and legal handling. Under Symon, ASIS was queried about the matter, and later the government dropped the prosecution. Symon defended the agency's need to protect sensitive information while balancing "open justice".

In 2018, it was reported that Symon appeared before an administrative tribunal to argue that 40-year-old classified intelligence documents related to East Timor and the Balibo massacre should not be released yet, which drew public criticism from academics and relatives seeking answers.

On 20 February 2023, Symon was succeeded by Kerri Hartland as Director-General of ASIS. Following, his end at ASIS, he was appointed to several corporate and advisory roles in defence, national security and aerospace sectors.

== Later life ==
On 1 September 2026, he was awarded the Group Bravery Citation along with eleven other members of the Australian Defence Force for serving with UNAMET in East Timor in 1999.

== Personal life ==
Symon is married to Kate and they have two children. He enjoys running half marathons and sharing the company of his family and friends.

Symon has a strong liking for singer-songwriter Adele, AFL club Carlton, and poetry.

Military offices
Preceded by Major General Richard Wilson	Director Defence Intelligence Organisation; 2011–2014	Succeeded by Air Vice Marshal John McGarry
Preceded by Major General David Morrison	Deputy Chief of Army; 2009–2011	Succeeded by Major General Jeffrey Sengelman
Government offices
Preceded by Nick Warner	Director-General of the Australian Secret Intelligence Service; 2017–2023	Succeeded by Kerri Hartland
