= Alfred S. Cheadle =

Wool merchant in South Australia

- Born: 1853; Bradford, Yorkshire
- Died: 5 January 1923 (aged 69–70)

Alfred Stanley Cheadle (1853 – 5 January 1923) was a wool merchant in South Australia.

== History ==
Cheadle was born in of Bradford, Yorkshire, a son of Peter Cheadle and Eliza Cheadle, later Mellor, (c. 1831 – 22 February 1912). His father was a manufacturer of woollen goods in Halifax, and the son had extensive experience in the wool trades in the Bradford mill founded by his grandfather, then two years in Roubaix, France.

He emigrated to South Australia aboard the clipper City of Adelaide with his mother Eliza Mellor, and step-father James Mellor, arriving 27 June 1880. He worked for Thomas Elder, first at Beltana station, then for four years with Elder, Smith & Co. He next worked as Adelaide manager for the wool and produce department of New Zealand Loan and Mercantile Company. When that company closed their Adelaide branch in 1895, Cheadle and Roland Strachan ( –1925) took over that business under the style of Strachan, Cheadle & Co., which was taken over by Dalgety & Co., Limited, with Cheadle in charge of the wool department.

He then founded, with Arthur Vivian Crase (1867–1940), the woolbroking firm of Cheadle, Crase & Co., which merged into Bennett & Fisher, Limited in 1919.

Cheadle died after a long illness at Victor Harbor, where he had gone in the hope of a recovery.

== Other interests ==
Cheadle was a member and served as president of the Adelaide Chamber of Commerce.

He was a member of St. Peters Town Council for some years, and served as mayor 1892–1894.

He served as examiner of woolclassing at the South Australian School of Mines and Industries

== Family ==
Alfred Stanley Cheadle (c. 1853 – 5 January 1923) married Margaret Loutit ( – 29 July 1946), daughter of Thomas F. Loutit, of Mount Pleasant on 28 January 1886; they had two sons and three daughters:

- Thomas Stanley Cheadle (12 July 1887 – 1959) married Norah Rivoli Murphy ( –1962) in 1928. He was chairman of directors, Bennett & Fisher, and was champion amateur golfer from age 16.
- Agnes Cheadle (22 February 1891 – ) married (James) Hugh Paterson Davis on 12 April 1911
- Mary Alison Cheadle (27 December 1896 – ) married Jefferson Hirst Walker in 1929
- (Frances) Margaret Cheadle BSc. Hons. (1900–1995) married Paul McGuire CBE in 1927. She was noted insulin researcher, convert to Catholicism, and prolific author. He was Ambassador to Italy and an authority on maritime history. The Paul McGuire Maritime Library at the State Library of South Australia was established in his memory.
- Peter Roland Cheadle (9 September 1906 – 1985) married Jessie Stodart (c. 1902 – 1997) in 1932, lived in Walkerville and were prominent socialites.

They had residences at Medindie and "The Shay" Mount Lofty, sold 1922. Peter Cheadle had a holiday cottage nearby, dubbed "Little Shay".

Alfred Mellor ( – 23 April 1911) of Melbourne, Emily Maud Mellor (later Mrs. Thomas Wood of Willunga), Charles J. Mellor, and Arthur Mellor, were step-siblings.
