= Cedric Kellway =

Australian public servant and diplomat

Ced Kellway
- Born: Cedric Vernon Kellway; 2 July 1892; Condah, Victoria, Australia
- Died: 14 June 1963 (aged 70); Bath, Somerset, England
- Occupations: Public servant, diplomat
- Spouse: Eileen Mary Hannan (m. 1920)

Cedric Vernon "Ced" Kellway (2 July 1892 – 14 June 1963) was an Australian public servant and diplomat.

== Career ==
Kellway joined the Commonwealth Public Service in 1908, in the Treasury.

In September 1945, Kellway was appointed Consul-General in New York. Four years later, in September 1949, Kellway was named as the first Minister to Italy. Kellway and his family left directly from New York for Rome in October 1949. While Kellway was Minister to Italy his daughter Anne met Lieutenant Jeffrey Francis and was married in Rome, in 1953.

Kellway was appointed Minister to Brazil in 1954. While posted in Brazil, Kellway's wife was flown to New York for successful surgery, on the advice of physicians.

Kellway retired to Bath, Somerset. He died on 14 June 1963.

Diplomatic posts
New title Position established	Australian Consul General in New York; 1945–1949	Succeeded by Edward Smart
New title Position established	Australian Minister to Italy; 1949–1954	Succeeded by Paul McGuire
Preceded by John Ryan as Chargé d'affaires	Australian Ambassador to Brazil; 1954–1959	Succeeded by Donald Mackinnon
