= Australia and the Indonesian occupation of East Timor =

Australia, a close neighbour of both Indonesia and East Timor, was the only country to recognise Indonesia's annexation of East Timor. Some members of the Australian public supported self-determination for East Timor, and also actively supported the independence movement within Australia. The Australian Government saw the need for both stability and good relations with their neighbour, Indonesia. However, it was criticised in some quarters, including by Xanana Gusmão (the FRETILIN leader) for putting those issues above human rights. In 1998, the Howard government changed its stance and supported East Timor self-determination, prompting a referendum that saw East Timor gain its independence.

== Background ==
With a change in government following the 1974 Portuguese revolution, the colonial ruler of East Timor, Portugal, moved to decolonise. As a result, Portugal effectively abandoned their colony of East Timor. Following this, in 1975, the two main East Timorese political parties Fretilin and the UDT, formed a government. At this time, Indonesia began a secret operation to build a relationship with the UDT, named Operation Komodo. The UDT attempted a coup, which Fretilin resisted with the help of the local Portuguese military. With the UDT leaders fleeing into Indonesia, Fretilin made a unilateral declaration of independence on 28 November 1975, of the Democratic Republic of East Timor (República Democrática de Timor-Leste in Portuguese). Shortly after, on 7 December 1975, Indonesian forces invaded East Timor.

== Overview ==
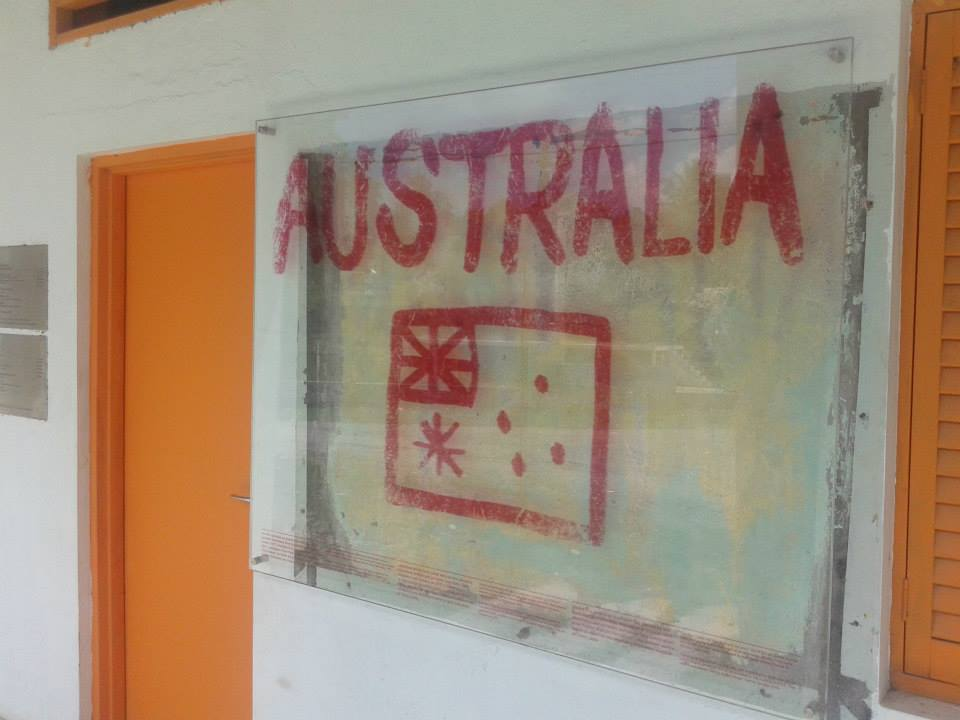
The Flag House in Balibo

According to author Clinton Fernandes the governments of Malcolm Fraser, Bob Hawke and Paul Keating co-operated with the Indonesian military and President Suharto to obscure details about conditions in East Timor and to preserve Indonesian control of the region. Australian governments saw good relations and stability in Indonesia (Australia's largest neighbour) as providing an important security buffer to Australia's north. Nevertheless, Australia provided important sanctuary to East Timorese independence advocates like José Ramos-Horta (who based himself in Australia during his exile). However, throughout the duration of Indonesia's occupation of East Timor, the Australian public were generally uncomfortable, if not actively against the occupation, initially highlighted by the deaths of five Australian journalists who came to be known as the "Balibo 5". Also the actions of the Timorese people in supporting Australian forces during the Battle of Timor in World War II were well-remembered, particularly by veterans. These two issues kept the East Timor occupation in a negative light, throughout the duration of the invasion and occupation. Protests took place in Australia against the occupation, prominent East Timorese lived in Australia and kept the issue alight, and some Australian nationals participated in the resistance movement. According to Professor James Cotton, writing in his book on the invasion, Suharto in fact avoided coming to Australia, with the knowledge that there would be public protests.

== Governmental responses ==
=== Whitlam government 1974–75 ===
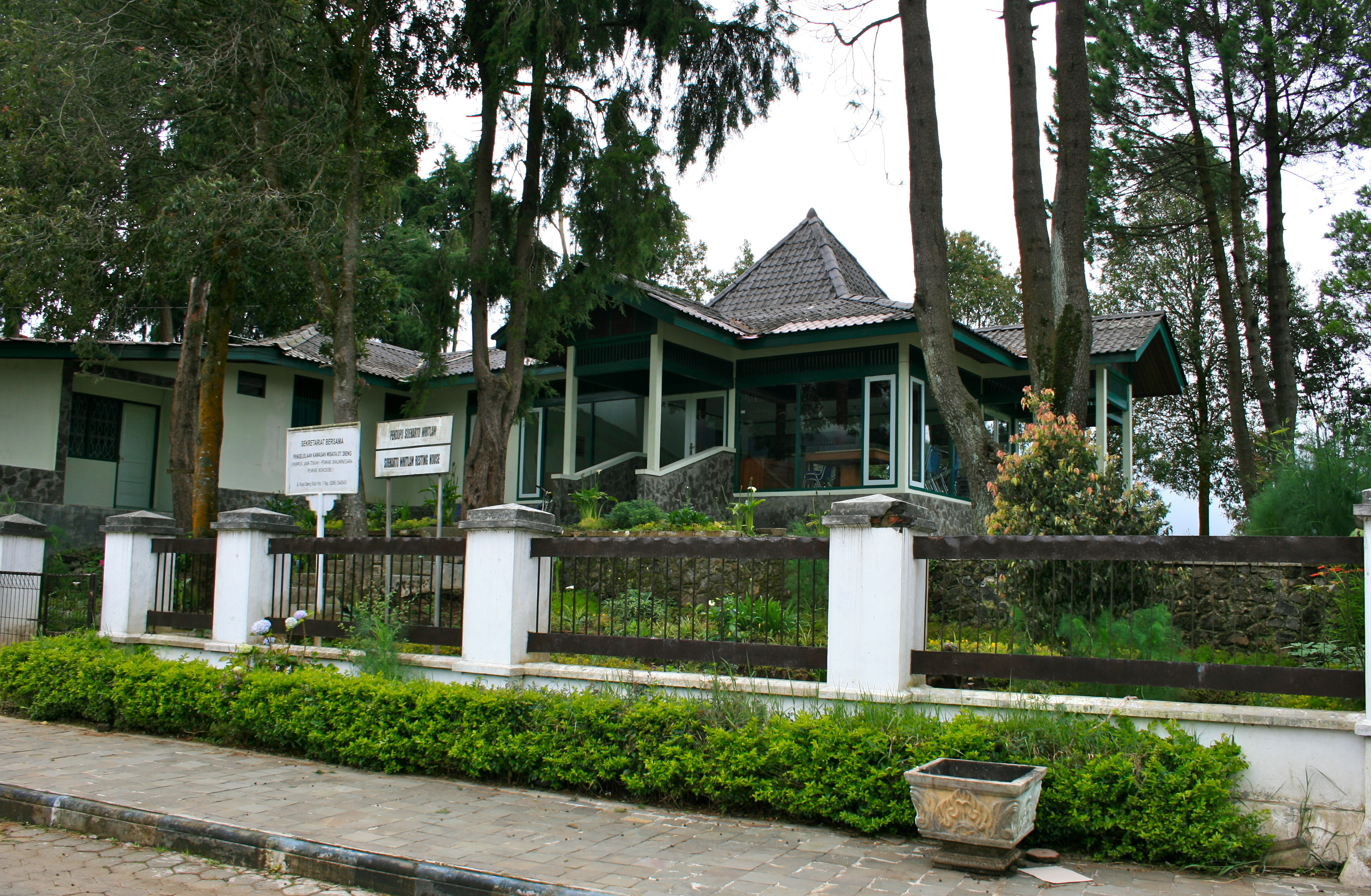
Suharto-Whitlam House in Dieng Plateau, Central Java, where East Timor's fate was discussed in 1974.

There are a number of reasons why the Whitlam government supported Indonesia's annexation of East Timor. Whitlam, speaking to the ABC, said to an extent, his Government was carrying on the view that East Timor was not viable as an independent state. Additionally, there were initial fears of a possible Communist government being installed in East Timor by the Timorese, after the withdrawal of the Portuguese. This saw the Whitlam government look favourably upon Indonesian annexation, and Whitlam expressed this desire to Suharto in a visit to him in 1974.

Michael Salla, writing in the Australian Journal of International Affairs, said Whitlam perceived and interpreted the issue in an anti-colonial framework. Whitlam himself said "the division of the island of Timor is no more than an accident of Western colonial history". There were also fears that a long drawn out civil war could result in great loss of life over a long period, as had occurred in Angola, another ex-Portuguese colony. To an extent, Whitlam established the logic and support of the annexation, and this was carried on by later Australian prime ministers and their governments. In addition, the Australian Government saw the desire for peace in the ASEAN region. Nicholas Klar, writing on Whitlam's response to the Indonesian invasion, said that Whitlam also was concerned that revolution by separation movements could spread across Indonesia, causing a domino effect that could see the balkanisation of Indonesia into several small states. According to historian Luke Miller, Wikileaks documents have indicated that before the invasion, there is some possible evidence that Australia was feeding intelligence to Indonesia about Portugal, in order to minimise misunderstanding about the situation between the two countries.

It has been argued that comments by the Whitlam government may have encouraged the Suharto regime to invade East Timor, with former Army officer, and deputy commander of UNTAET, Michael Smith, writing that the invasion at least had "tacit approval from Australia and the United States". Despite this, and the general favourable view of the annexation, the Australian Government voted for a UN resolution condemning the invasion, in 1975.

During the lead up to Indonesia's invasion of East Timor in 1975, the Australian Secret Intelligence Service (ASIS) paid a Dili-based Australian businessman Frank Favaro for information on local political developments. The leaking of his identity in late 1975 led to a confrontation between the then Labor Prime Minister Gough Whitlam and Bill Robertson, the head of ASIS, resulting in the sacking of the intelligence agency director on 21 October 1975, to take effect on 7 November. Bill Robertson disputes the reason for his dismissal in documents lodged with the National Archives in 2009.

=== Fraser government 1975–1984 ===
The government of Malcolm Fraser was the first to officially recognise Indonesia's de facto annexation of East Timor, doing so in January 1978. This was followed by de jure recognition, during negotiations with Indonesia regarding the seabed boundary between the two countries. The Prime Minister ordered the seizure of a two-way radio link between East Timor and Australia being operated illegally by Fretilin supporters near Darwin. Following his return from Jakarta, Mr Fraser gave instructions that the Telecom outpost radio service near Darwin cease picking up and passing on Fretilin messages from East Timor. He also denied Australian entry visas to Fretilin spokesmen claiming to represent the Democratic Republic of East Timor.

The opposition party at the time, the Labor Party, in 1979, called on the Fraser government to withdraw the recognition. Fraser himself saw that he had no choice but to continue the recognition, as it would have caused serious repercussions with Indonesia, and the US at the time would not support Australia, as they saw the East Timorese resistance group, FRETILIN, as communists, and it was seen in Australia's interest to support Indonesia.

=== Hawke government 1983–1991 ===
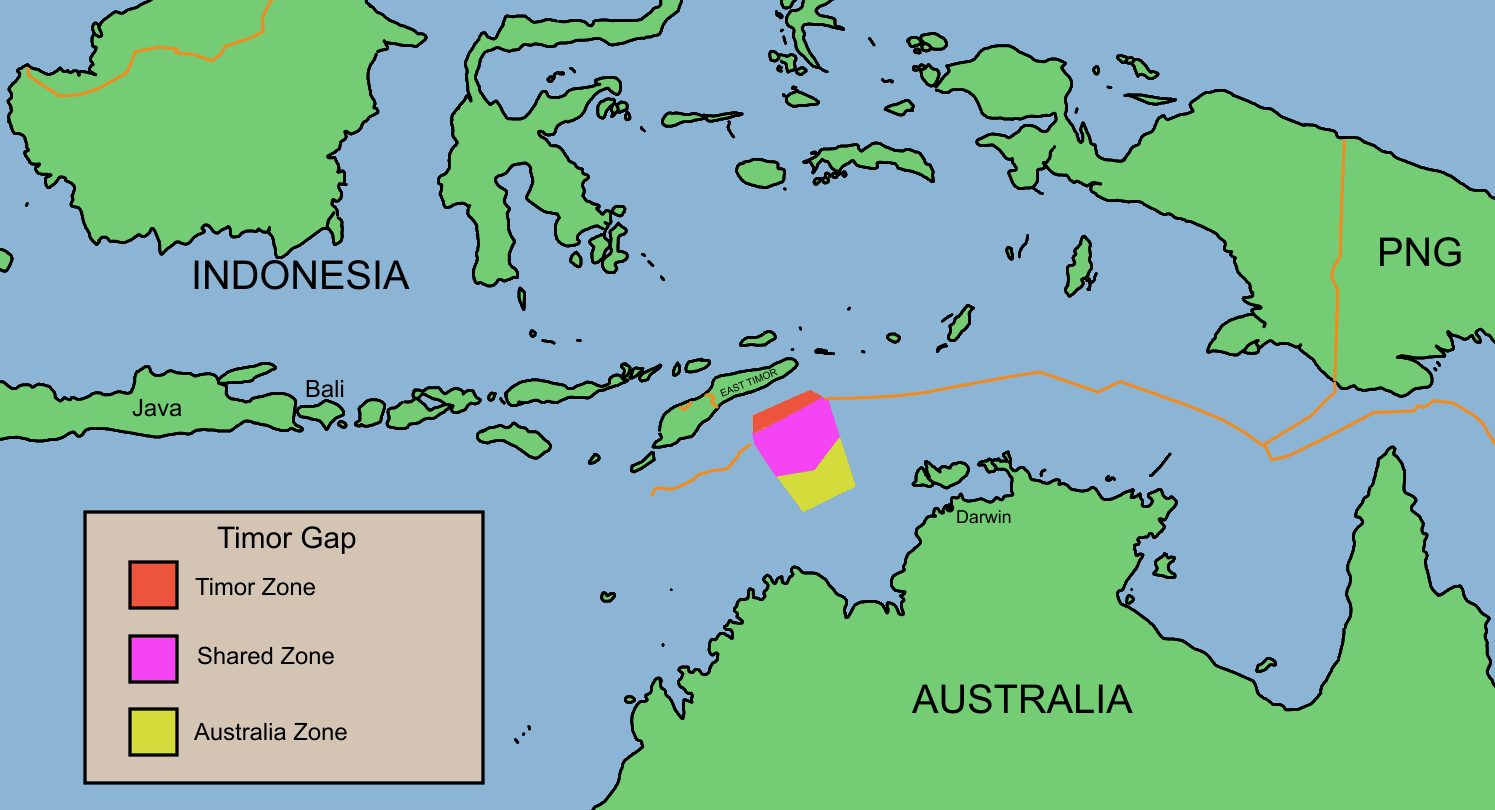
The Timor Gap

The Hawke government continued and confirmed Australia's de jure recognition of the Indonesian annexation of East Timor. Portugal expressed its displeasure by recalling its Ambassador, Inacio Rebello de Andrade, back to Lisbon. Indonesian and Australian representatives signed the Timor Gap Treaty in a plane above the Timor Sea. The treaty came into force on 9 February 1991. It established a zone of cooperation in an oil-rich undersea area, with future plans to manage oil resources in the area.

=== Keating government 1991–1996 ===
Initially, after Paul Keating took over the role of Prime Minister, he simply continued the recognition of Indonesia's annexation of East Timor. However, the Keating government escalated its military and other relations with Indonesia, beyond the level of engagement of previous governments. Both Australia and the US were involved in assisting the Indonesian military, and upgraded relations during this time included the signing of a security treaty. According to John Pilger and several other journalists, Keating was perceived as not having done enough, while Prime Minister, to prevent human rights abuses in East Timor, though others, such as Whitlam, have defended Keating's policies.

Birmingham, Cotton and Thakur, writing in their respective books on the occupation of East Timor, stated that following the 1991 Dili massacre, which occurred on 12 November 1991, the Keating government claimed the massacre was an aberration, and not indicative of the occupation as a whole. However, a Government Joint Committee criticised the Government, saying its response to the massacre should have been more condemning. While the US chose to limit their relation and military support for Indonesia after the massacre, Keating moved to increase Australia's military support, effectively stepping into the gap the US left.

Documentary maker John Pilger also accused Keating of covering up a second round of massacres, which occurred while he was Prime Minister. In response, Keating threatened to sue Pilger. Keating's foreign minister, Gareth Evans, defended Keating by saying that in fact, there had been a second round of massacres, though they had not been covered up. During the period of the East Timor occupation, Keating refused to give political asylum to East Timorese fleeing Timor. Keating at the time received criticism for his financial dealings with Indonesian business, specifically over the sale of a piggery to a financial businessman for $4 million.

=== Howard government and withdrawal of occupation forces 1996–2000 ===
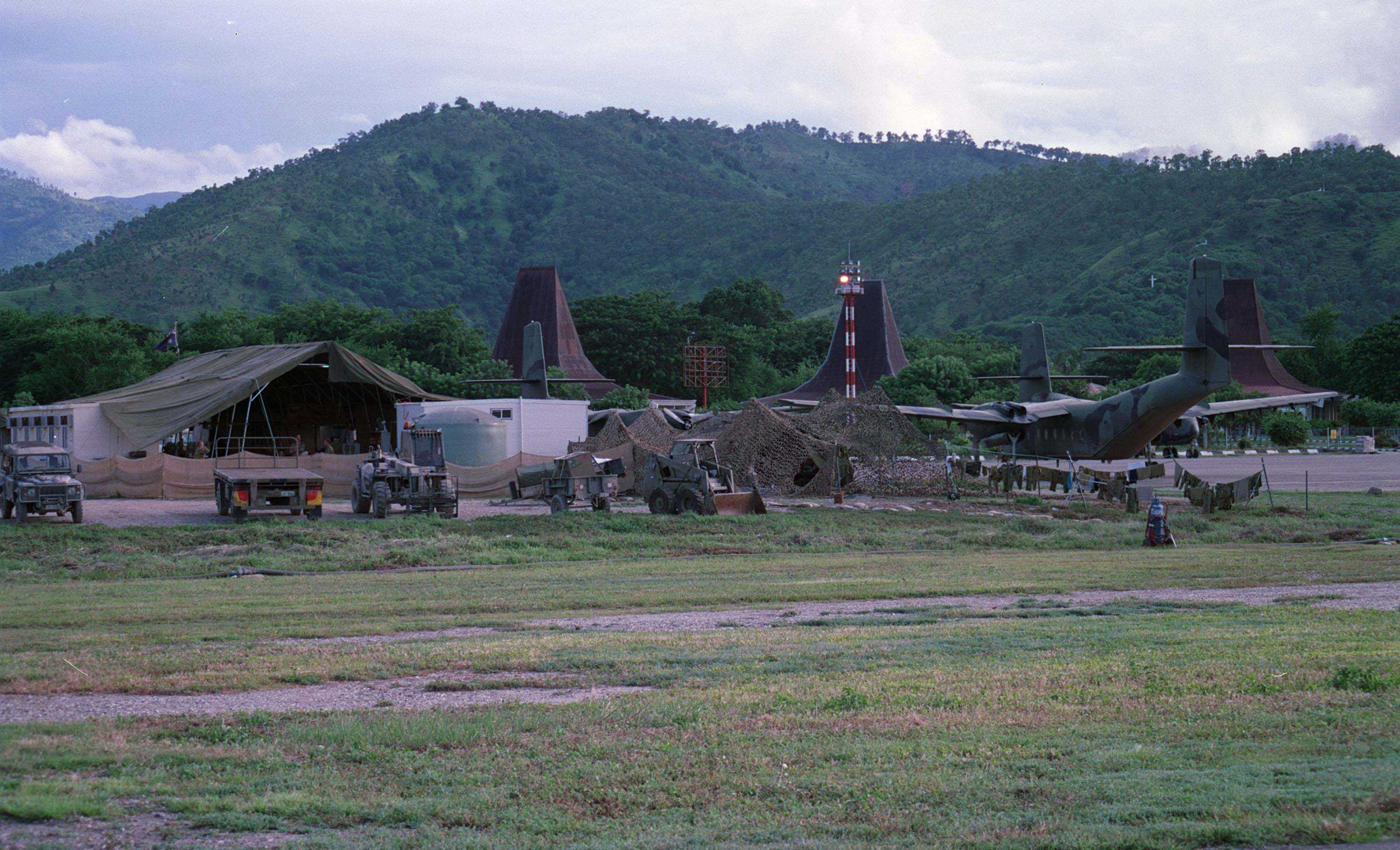
RAAF aircraft in Dili (2000)

After winning power in 1996, the Howard government initially continued on the path of the previous Australian governments, and continued to support Indonesia's annexation of East Timor. However, following the fall of Indonesian President Suharto the Howard government policy on East Timor shifted, and in 1998 Howard helped precipitate a proposal for a referendum on the question of independence for East Timor. In late 1998, the Howard government drafted a letter to Indonesia setting out a change in Australian policy, suggesting that the East Timorese be given a chance to vote on independence within a decade. The letter upset Indonesian President B. J. Habibie, who saw it as implying Indonesia was a "colonial power" and he decided to announce a snap referendum. There was also a view within Indonesia, that unless the issues of independence were dealt with in East Timor, Indonesia might spend 10 years investing money and time in the province, only to have the province break off. A UN-sponsored referendum held in 1999 showed overwhelming approval for independence, but was followed by violent clashes and a security crisis, instigated by anti-independence militia. Australia then led the United Nations backed International Force for East Timor (INTERFET) to end the violence and order was restored.

After the withdrawal of the Indonesian military from East Timor, violence flared in Indonesia, mainly involving pro-Indonesian militia. Australia under the then Prime Minister, John Howard (who had replaced Keating in 1996), deployed peacekeepers as part of INTERFET to stop violence against the East Timorese by militia. In response, Keating was reported as saying that the violence was in fact Howard's fault. While some media commentators defended Keating's comments, and said he had been misinterpreted, other commentary from journalists and politicians argued at the time that in fact Keating's attack on Australia's intervention only highlighted Keating's own past errors in judgement over East Timor. The INTERFET coalition deployed to East Timor on 20 September 1999, as a non-UN force operating in accordance with UN Resolutions. Led by Australia, who contributed 5,500 personnel and the force commander, Major General Peter Cosgrove, it was tasked with restoring peace and security, protecting and supporting UNAMET, and facilitating humanitarian assistance. While the intervention was ultimately successful, Australian-Indonesian relations would take several years to recover.

== Australian public support for East Timor independence ==
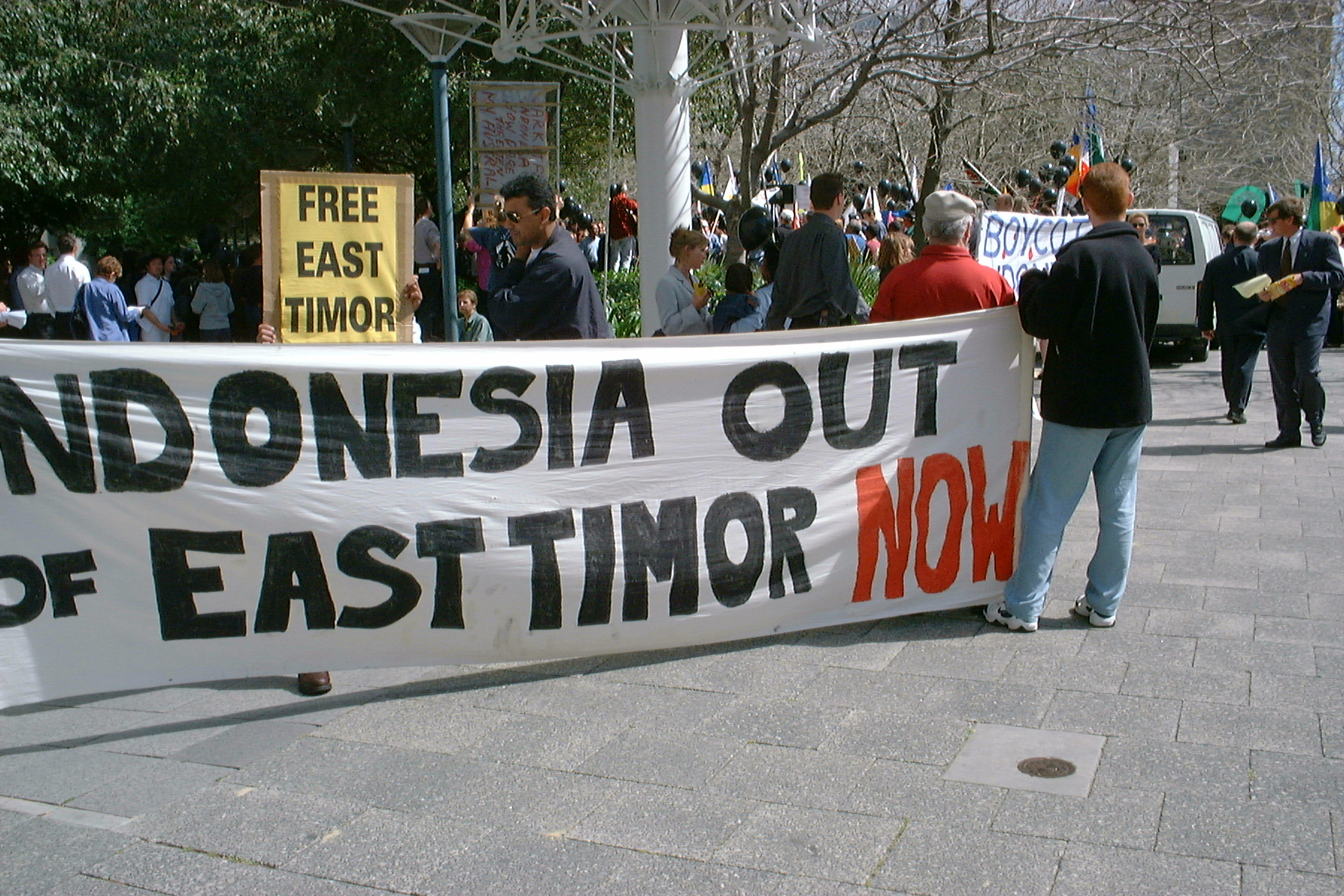
Demonstration in support of East Timorese independence in Perth (1999)

While the Government continued to recognise the annexation of East Timor during this period, there was a large amount of support for East Timorese self-determination by the Australian public. In particular, the Catholic Church, Unions, the Communist Party of Australia and East Timorese living in Australia worked together to protest against the issue.

Smith writes that throughout the occupation reports emerged from the province regarding human rights abuses. He states that mostly these were unsubstantiated until the November 1991 Santa Cruz incident, which was caught on camera. Smith goes on to write that "such human rights abuses prevented the Indonesians from gaining the trust and confidence of the [East Timorese] people and strengthened...international resentment against Indonesia's occupation". The feelings amongst the Australian public gradually peaked, and when the Militia violence occurred after the UN-sponsored referendum ballot in 1999, the feelings were that strong the Australian Government moved to be involved to protect the East Timorese. Large scale protests in Melbourne and Sydney and other Australian cities occurred in support of intervention that attracted tens of thousands of people.

Australia subsequently played a leading role in the establishment of the international peace keeping force that deployed to East Timor in September 1999, following Indonesian consent.
