= Australia–Brazil bilateral treaties =

The following is a list of international bilateral treaties between Australia and Brazil

- Early treaties were extended to Australia by the British Empire, however they are still generally in force.

Entry into force	Topic	Title	Ref
1872	Extradition	Treaty between the United Kingdom of Great Britain and Ireland and Brazil for the Mutual Surrender of Fugitive Criminals, and Protocol (Rio de Janeiro, 13 November 1872)	
1888	Extradition	Agreement between the United Kingdom of Great Britain and Ireland and Brazil for the Surrender of Merchant Seamen Deserters (Rio de Janeiro, 30 July 1888)	
1911	Arbitration	Arbitration Convention between the United Kingdom of Great Britain and Ireland and Brazil	
1921	Arbitration	Treaty Between the United Kingdom of Great Britain and Ireland and Brazil Providing for the Establishment of a Peace Commission	
1940	Trade	Exchange of Notes constituting an Agreement between the Government of the Commonwealth of Australia and the Government of the Republic of Brazil regulating Commercial Relations	
1969	Visas	Exchange of Notes between the Government of Australia and the Government of the Federative Republic of Brazil for the Issue of Gratis Visas to Visitors	
1978	Trade	Trade Agreement between the Government of Australia and the Government of the Federative Republic of Brazil	
1996	Extradition	Treaty on Extradition between Australia and the Federative Republic of Brazil	
