= Australia–Timor-Leste relations =

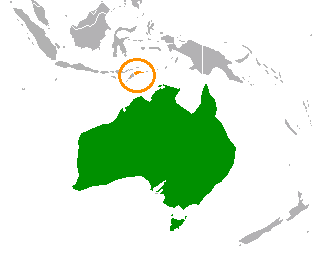

- Australia: Timor-Leste

Bilateral relations exist between Australia and Timor-Leste (East Timor). The two countries are near neighbours with close political and trade ties. Timor-Leste, the youngest and one of the poorest countries in Asia, lies about 610 kilometres northwest of the Australian city of Darwin. Australia has played a prominent role in the young republic's history.

Australia led international support for Timor-Leste during its first 10 years of independence, not only as the largest bilateral donor of development assistance, but also by providing a leadership role to ensure security and stability in the country. Australia also led the military force that helped stabilise the country after it gained independence from Indonesia in 1999 and it has been a major source of aid ever since. In 2004, relations between the two countries were briefly deteriorated as a result of the Australia–Timor-Leste spying scandal but the two countries still remained cooperative.

Australia is Timor-Leste's biggest supporter and largest development partner. Over the years, Australia has provided substantial financial assistance, totalling more than 1 billion in Australian dollars in development aid since 2000. Providing vital support in areas such as infrastructure, health, education, and governance, Australia's aid also focuses on regional integration, security and capacity-building programs.

== History ==
=== Colonial period ===
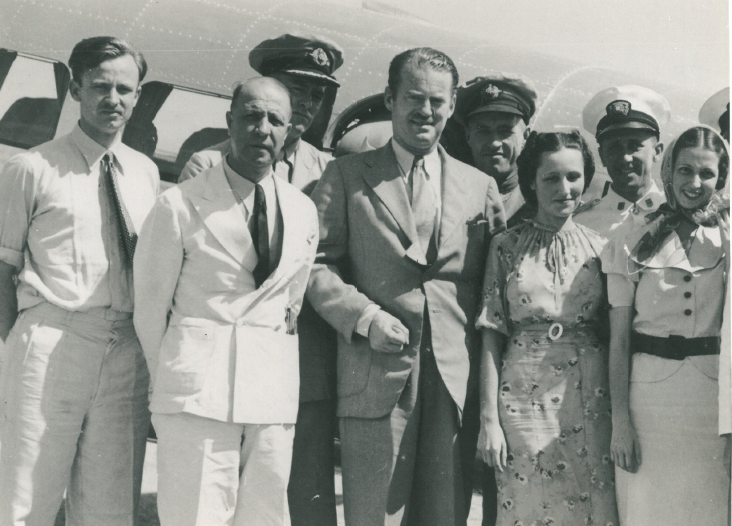
Australian air minister James Fairbairn meeting with Portuguese officials in Dili in July 1939

In July 1939, Australian air minister James Fairbairn visited Portuguese Timor on behalf of the Menzies government to investigate the possibility of an air service between Dili and Darwin. Fairbairn obtained support from the colony's acting governor, although they faced a language barrier and had to negotiate partly in French. On his return, Fairbairn stated that an air service was necessary to prevent Australian oil concessions from being lost to the Japanese. Fairbairn, a qualified pilot, flew to the island himself on a Lockheed Model 10 Electra chartered from Guinea Airways, departing from Darwin and returning on the same day. It has been suggested that his visit "was most notable for being the first time anyone had left the country, landed on foreign soil, and returned to Australia in a single day. An agreement for the Darwin–Dili air service was signed in late 1940, following approval from the Portuguese government, and representatives from Australia's Department of Civil Aviation visited in January 1941 to conduct a survey of the aerodrome and proposed flying boat base.

During World War II, Portuguese Timor was notionally neutral (in line with Portugal's neutrality), but was deemed of strategic importance and occupied by Australian and Dutch forces in December 1941 following the start of the Pacific War. Japanese forces occupied the territory in February 1942, but Australian soldiers remained present on the island for three years in the resulting Battle of Timor.

Aviation official David Ross was appointed as Australia's first official representative in Portuguese Timor in 1941, but did not obtain consular rank. In October 1945, the Chifley government announced the establishment of an Australian consulate in Dili, with Charles Eaton appointed as consul in January 1946. Portuguese Timor's colonial governor Óscar Freire de Vasconcelos Ruas conducted an official visit to Australia in 1947, while his successor César Maria de Serpa Rosa visited in 1951.

=== Indonesian occupation ===
Australian Prime Minister Gough Whitlam told Indonesia that his government would not oppose an annexation of East Timor in 1975, a decision that quickly proved controversial at home. In October 1975, Indonesian troops poured across East Timor's border with Indonesian West Timor at the town of Balibo. Among those killed by the advancing Indonesian troops were five Australia-based journalists, who came to be known as the Balibo Five. Many in Australia and elsewhere were convinced that the murder of the unarmed reporters was intentional. Australian support was criticised at times. Australia and Indonesia concluded several contracts about the boundary between Timor-Leste and Australia during occupation time, which is causing several quarrels between independent Timor-Leste and its bigger neighbour.

=== Post-independence period ===
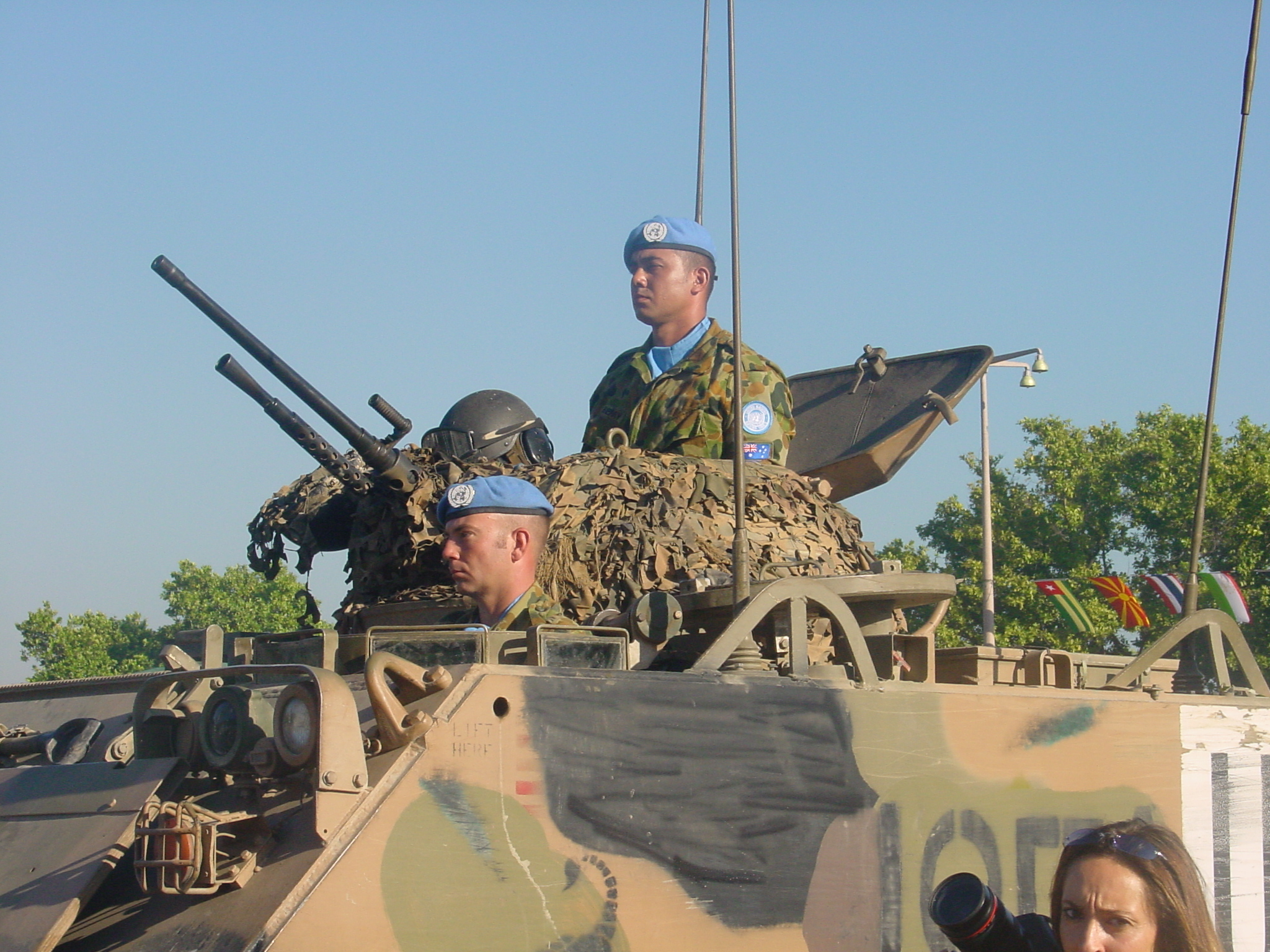
Australian soldiers participating in UN peacekeeping operations in East Timor

Timor-Leste reachieved their independence on 20 May 2002, after 24 years occupation by Indonesia and three years of UN administration. The process of Timor-Leste independence began by a referendum arranged by United Nations, Indonesia and the former colonial power Portugal to choose between autonomy within Indonesia or independence. Eventually the Timor-Leste voted overwhelmingly for independence. Australia led the INTERFET during the following 1999 East Timorese crisis to stop Indonesian militias and army attacking the East Timorese civilians, and to establish the UN administration.

Since 2002, Timor-Leste had begun as the first new sovereign nation of the 21st century. Australia's involvement with Timor-Leste has deepened since independence, especially after the internal conflict in 2006 and the sending of Australian peacekeepers.

== High-level visits ==
There have been numerous high-level visits between Australia and Timor-Leste:

- December 2018 – Former Prime Minister Xanana Gusmao visited Sydney
- August 2013 – then Minister for International Development Melissa Parke visited Timor-Leste
- July 2013 – President Taur Matan Ruak visited Australia
- February 2013 – then Minister for Energy and Resources and Minister for Tourism Martin Ferguson visited Timor-Leste
- December 2012 – then Foreign Minister Bob Carr visited Timor-Leste
- May 2012 – then Governor General Ms Quentin Bryce AC CVO and then Minister for Veterans' Affairs, Warren Snowdon, visited Timor-Leste to attend Timor-Leste's 10th anniversary of independence celebrations
- February 2012 – Prime Minister Xanana Gusmão visited Australia
- July 2011 – then Foreign Minister Kevin Rudd visited Timor-Leste
- April 2011 – then Defence Minister Stephen Smith visited Timor-Leste
- December 2010 – then Minister for Home Affairs Brendan O'Connor visited Timor-Leste
- October 2010 – Minister for Immigration and Citizenship Chris Bowen visited Timor-Leste
- June 2010 – then President Ramos-Horta visited Australia accompanied by three Ministers

== Military ==
Australian Defence Force units arrived in East Timor in 1999 to quell the rioting, disorder and low-level fighting created by the Indonesian military's scorched earth campaign as it withdrew from its former possession in 1999. Australia led the INTERFET operation in 1999, and provided substantial forces to the subsequent United Nations Transitional Administration in East Timor and its successor operations. Australia also landed combat troops in the country in 2006 to quell ethnic fighting that involved East Timorese police and soldiers. The last Australian peacekeeping forces left Timor-Leste in December 2012.

The Timor Leste Defence Force has received assistance with training, advice and other forms of support from the Australian Defence Force since 2001 as part of Australia's Defence Cooperation Program. As of 2015, 25 Australian military personnel were stationed in Timor-Leste to deliver this assistance.

== Economic and trade relations ==
In 2013–2014, Timor-Leste ranked as Australia's 118th largest goods trading partner, with total merchandise trade valued at $24 Million Australia and Timor-Leste had been on an international cooperation in agriculture with Timor-Leste's largest agriculture export is Coffee. Other potential agricultural crops are vanilla, spices, candle-nut and palm oil.

Monthly value of Australian merchandise exports to East Timor (A$ millions) since 2002

=== Oil disputes ===
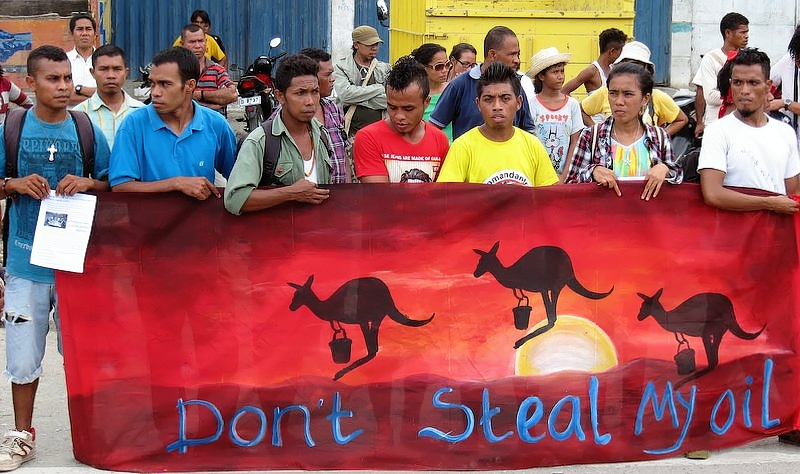
Demonstration against Australia Dec. 2013

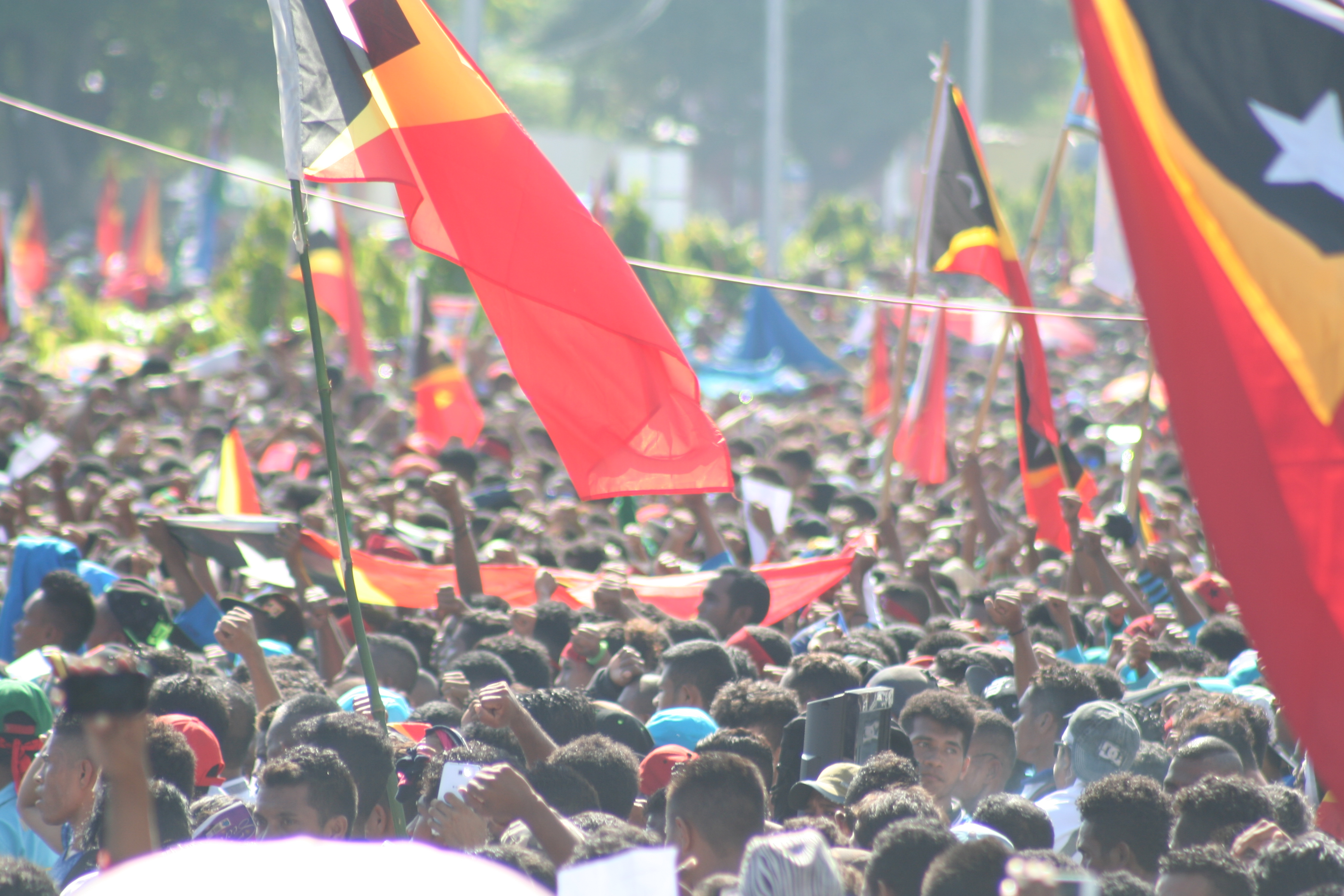
Over ten thousand Timorese demonstrated in 2016 at the Australian embassy in Dili

Large oil and gas reserves lie in the sea between the two countries in an area known as the Timor Gap. Territorial disputes over control of this resource, which some geologists estimate could pump over $10 billion of oil and gas, have coloured diplomacy with Timor-Leste, both when it was an Indonesian possession and since. Australia broke with many of its allies and recognised Indonesia's annexation of East Timor in 1976 in what was widely seen by analysts at the time as a quid pro quo for a treaty favourable to Australia involving oil and gas exploration in the area. Since Timor-Leste's independence, disputes over the split Dili would receive when the resource was finally developed have been an occasional strain on otherwise close relations.

It was revealed in 2013 that the Australian Secret Intelligence Service (ASIS) planted listening devices to listen to the East Timorese government during negotiations over the Greater Sunrise oil and gas fields. In the aftermath of the Australia–Timor-Leste spying scandal, Timor-Leste launched a case at the Permanent Court of Arbitration in The Hague to pull out of the gas treaty it had signed with Australia accusing the latter of having its intelligence agency, the Australian Secret Intelligence Service (ASIS), bug the East Timorese cabinet room in Dili in 2004.

On 3 March 2014, in response to an East Timorese request for an indication of provisional measures, the International Court of Justice (ICJ) ordered Australia not to interfere with communications between Timor-Leste and its legal advisors in the arbitral proceedings and related matters.

New negotiations about the maritime boundary began in 2014. Both parties signed a revised agreement in March 2018, ending the long-running dispute. In addition to demarcating maritime borders, the agreement guarantees 70-80% of revenue to Timor-Leste and 20-30% of revenue to Australia depending on where gas is piped.

=== Timor Sea maritime arrangements ===
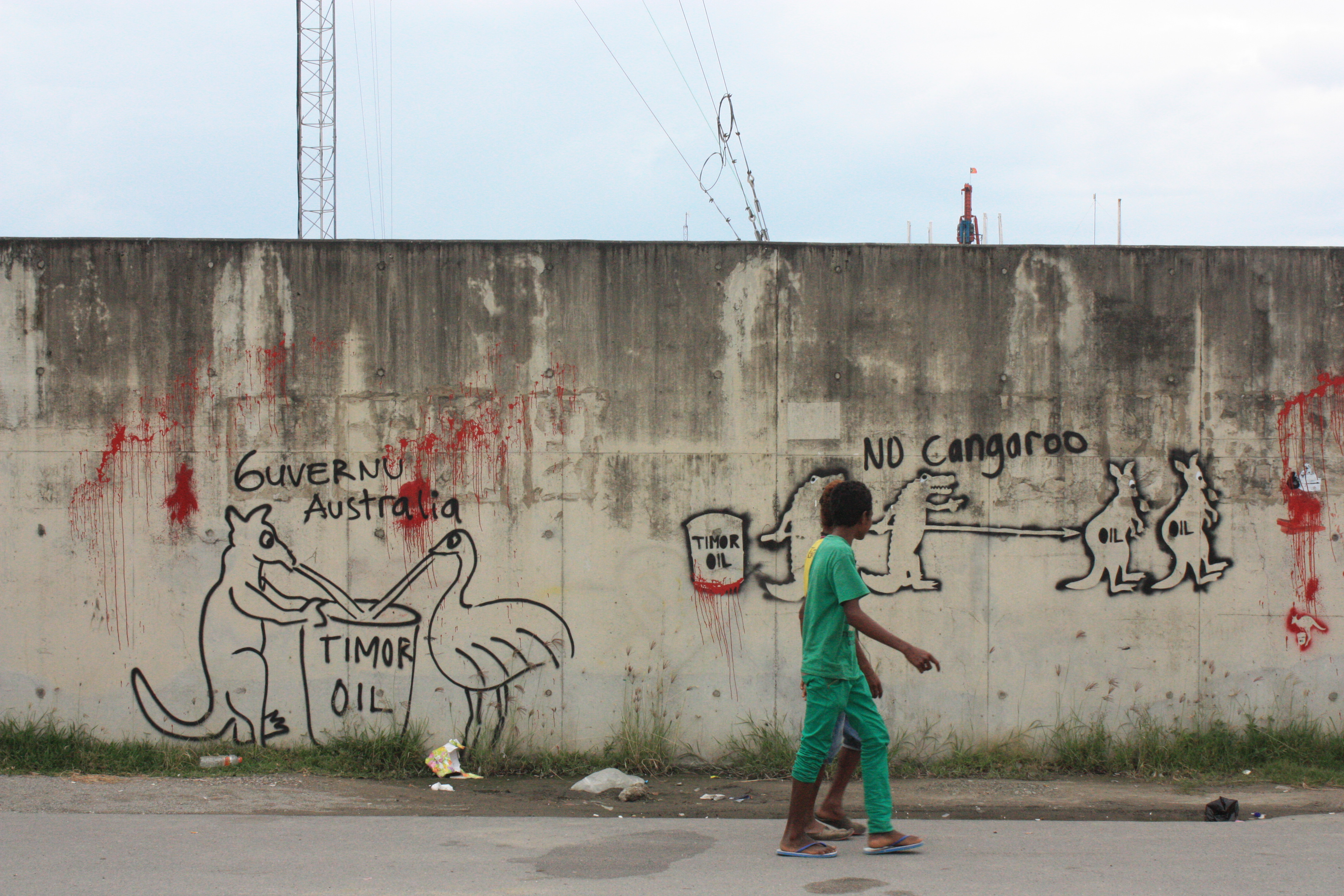
Graffiti on the wall of Australian embassy in Dili (2014)

Currently Australia and Timor-Leste have three agreements regarding maritime arrangements with Timor Sea. The Timor Sea Treaty between the government of Timor-Leste and the government of Australia which took place in Dili, 20 May 2001, and came into force on 2 April 2003. This treaty is for a joint exploration, development and exploitation of the petroleum resources from the Joint Petroleum Development Area (JPDA).

Treaty on a Maritime Arrangement in the Timor Sea between Australia and the democratic arrangement in the Timor Sea was signed in Sydney on 12 January 2006 and came into force on 23 February 2007. This treaty provides for an equally shared revenue derived from the production of petroleum.

International Unitization Agreement for Greater Sunrise is an agreement between Australia and the Government of Democratic Republic of Timor-Leste relating to the unitization of the sunrise troubadour fields. This agreement regarding the exploitation of the Sunrise and Troubadour petroleum and gas fields in Timor Sea that known as the Greater Sunrise.

== Aid ==
Australia has been the biggest development partner with Timor-Leste, where Timor-Leste is one of the poorest nations, ranking 147 out of 187 countries in the UN Human Development Index. In the decade of 2000–2010, Australia was scheduled to have provided around A$760 million in direct aid to Timor-Leste. In 2010, Timor-Leste President José Ramos-Horta said that 10 years of foreign aid, including from Australia, had "had no impact on transforming the lives of the people" In 2013–14, the estimated annual aid budget from Australia to Timor-Leste was A$106 million.

Both countries shared the Timor-Leste – Australia Strategic Planning Agreement for Development (2011), where both countries work together, in close cooperation, to improve the lives of all citizens of Timor-Leste and in so doing strengthen the bonds between our two peoples and countries. This agreement is based on priorities taken directly from Timor-Leste's Strategic development Plan 2012–2030, include on economic development, infrastructure development, social capital, and institution framework.

== Resident diplomatic missions ==
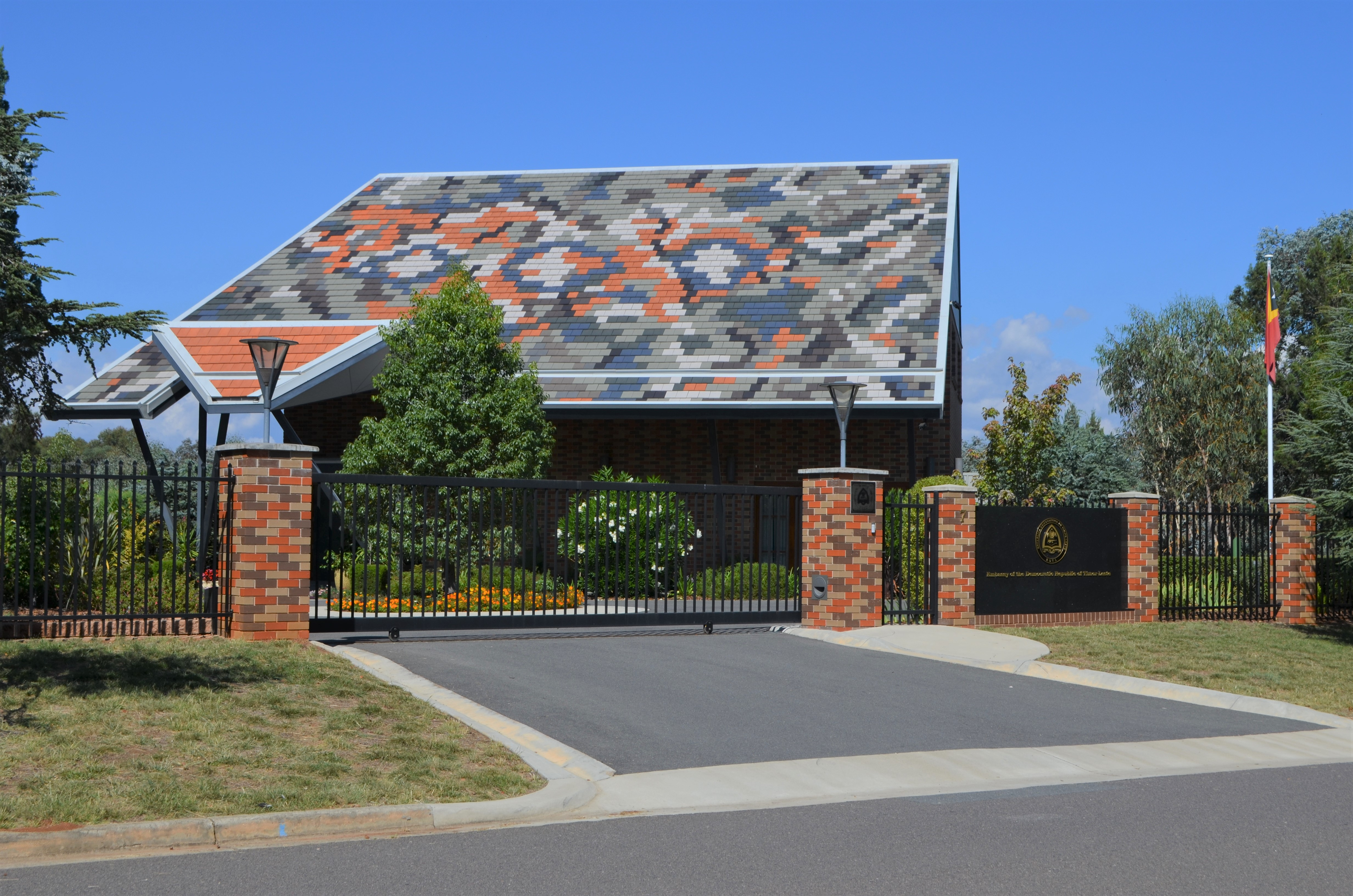
Embassy of Timor-Leste in Canberra

- Australia has an embassy in Dili.
- Timor-Leste has an embassy in Canberra and consulates-general in Darwin and in Sydney.

== See also ==
- Timor Sea Treaty
- Australia-Timor-Leste spying scandal
- Treaty on Certain Maritime Arrangements in the Timor Sea
