= Timor Gap Treaty =

Treaty between Australia and Indonesia

Treaty between Australia and The Republic of Indonesia on the Zone of Cooperation in an area between the Indonesian province of East Timor and Northern Australia
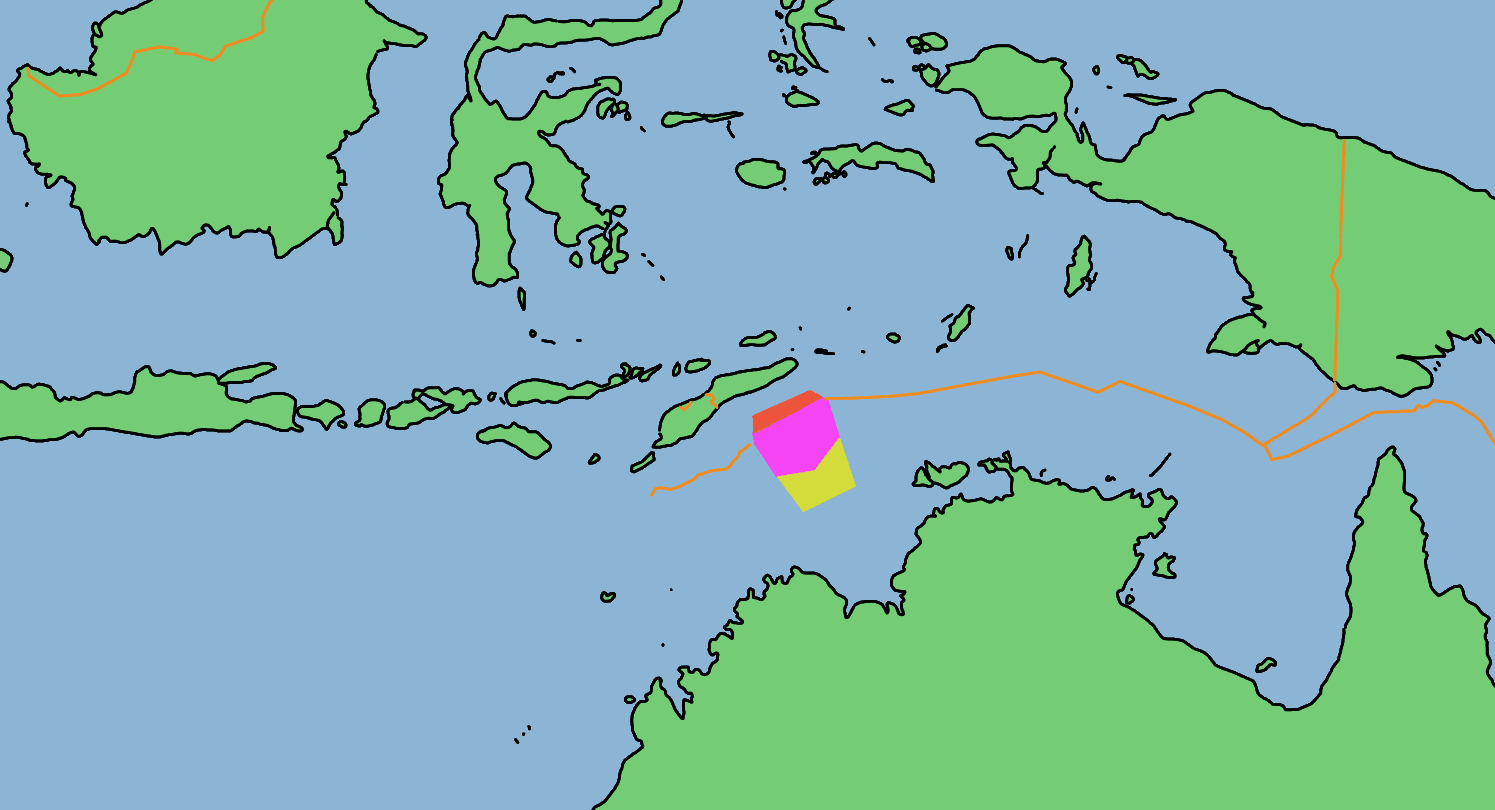
- The Timor Gap; The Zone of Cooperation was divided into Area A (Pink), Area B (Yellow) and Area C (Red)
- Type: Bilateral Treaty
- Signed: 11 December 1989
- Effective: 9 February 1991
- Expiry: 20 May 2002
- Original signatories: (Australia) Gareth Evans; (Indonesia) Ali Alatas
- Parties: Australia; Indonesia

The Timor Gap Treaty was formally known as the Treaty between Australia and the Republic of Indonesia on the zone of cooperation in an area between the Indonesian province of East Timor and Northern Australia. It was a bilateral treaty between the governments of Australia and Indonesia, which provided for the joint exploitation of petroleum and hydrocarbon resources in a part of the Timor Sea Seabed. The treaty was signed on 11 December 1989 and came into force on 9 February 1991. The signatories to the treaty were then Australian Foreign Affairs Minister Gareth Evans and then Indonesian Foreign Minister Ali Alatas.

The Treaty has been the centre of much controversy as it was signed during a period of political uncertainty in East Timor. In 1991, Portugal challenged the validity of the Treaty in the International Court of Justice but no case could be brought due to the Court's lack of jurisdiction. The United Nations replaced Indonesia as a treaty party in 2000 after East Timor gained independence from Indonesia. In 2002, the Timor Gap Treaty was replaced by the Timor Sea Treaty between the Government of East Timor and the Government of Australia. In 2019, the Timor Sea Treaty was replaced by the Treaty Between Australia and the Democratic Republic of Timor-Leste Establishing Their Maritime Boundaries in the Timor Sea.

== Geographical and historical context of the treaty ==
The Timor Gap refers to the 60,000 square kilometre "coffin-shaped" area between Australia and East Timor. The area contains several oil and gas reserves. The exact value of the resources contained in the Timor Gap is unknown, but three of the largest reserves, Elang-Kakatua, Bayu-Undan and Sunrise-Troubadour are estimated to hold US$17 billion worth of oil.

The Timor Gap does not refer to any geographical landmark but is instead the area of continental shelf that was subject to negotiations between Indonesia, Australia and Portugal in the early 1970s. In 1971-2 Indonesia and Australia delimited their seabed boundaries in the Timor Sea. Australia attempted to negotiate with Portuguese Timor to come to a similar boundary agreement, but these negotiations remained inconclusive when Portugal withdrew from East Timor in 1975. As a result, there was a break in the Australia-Indonesia boundary in the area surrounding East Timor. This break is known as the Timor Gap.

On 7 December 1975, Indonesian forces invaded and annexed East Timor as its twenty-seventh province. This was nine days after East Timor had declared its independence following Portugal withdrawing from the country. The UN did not recognise Indonesia as the ruling force of East Timor and asserted Portugal as the administering authority of the nation. Australia initially refused to acknowledge Indonesian control of East Timor. However, in 1979 it gave de jure recognition of Indonesian occupation of the country, and began negotiations with Indonesia in relation to closing the Timor Gap.

=== Controversy surrounding Australia's involvement in the Indonesian invasion in East Timor ===
The extent to which Australia knowingly allowed or encouraged Indonesia to invade East Timor has long attracted international debate. Australia was the only western nation to recognise Indonesian rule. It has been contended by commentators such as Noam Chomsky, that Australia was motivated to support Indonesia due to the prospect of an eventual Timor Gap Treaty, which would have significant financial and resource benefits, and enhance the nation's relationship with Indonesia and its foothold in Asia.

Gareth Evans responded to these criticisms by asserting that Australia did not support the Indonesian invasion of East Timor, but had no power to stop Indonesia's invasion. He stated that there was "nothing morally offensive" about Australia's recognition of Indonesian sovereignty in East Timor as it never denied the right of self-determination of the East Timorese population. He also argued that East Timor "was never disadvantaged by the Timor Gap Treaty", as it was always intended that East Timor would replace Indonesia in the Treaty if they emerged as an independent nation.

== Formation and signing of the treaty ==
Indonesia and Australia held substantially different positions on how the Timor Gap should be delimited. Both positions were supported by conflicting sources of International Law, complicating the treaty making process.

Australia proposed that the boundaries should be determined according to the Convention on the Continental Shelf 1958, which grants sovereignty to a nation over the continental shelf beyond their shores. Australia contended that the Timor Trough marked the edge of its continental shelf, giving the nation sovereignty over a significant share of the Timor Gap pursuant to the Convention. This position was upheld in the North Sea Continental Shelf Cases of 1969, where the International Court of Justice determined a state's continental shelf to be the “natural prolongation of its land territory”.

Indonesia's position was based on the UN Convention on the Law of the Sea (UNCLOS) 1982, which gives a state full and exclusive rights over the 200 nautical miles from its territorial sea baseline, even if its continental shelf is geographically much smaller (unless proved that the continental shelf extends beyond this 200 nautical miles).

As neither party would concede, and an agreement on boundary lines could not be made, the parties instead agreed to a provisional arrangement in accordance to UNCLOS Article 83. In 1985, the parties agreed on the ‘Zone of Cooperation’ which would allow them to jointly exploit the resources in the Timor Gap. This arrangement was formalised on 11 December 1989 when the Timor Gap Treaty was signed by the Australian and Indonesian Foreign Ministers, Gareth Evans and Ali Alatas, during a flight over the Timor Gap. The Zone of Cooperation has been “heralded as the most complex, comprehensive and sophisticated maritime joint development zone ever concluded”.

== Effect of the treaty ==
The Timor Gap Treaty divided the Zone of Cooperation into three areas – Areas A, B and C. It created a regime for an initial term of 40 years for the exploration of resources in these three areas. Part II of the Treaty set out that Area B, the southern part of the Gap, was to be administered by Australia, with Indonesia entitled to 10 per cent of the Resource Rent Tax from petroleum revenues in the area. Area C, the northern part of the Gap, was to be administered by Indonesia who had to provide 10 per cent of tax revenue from petroleum activities in the area to Australia. Area A, the middle and largest portion of the Gap, was jointly administered by both parties and revenues were divided equally. The rights of both parties to Area A were monitored by the Joint Authority and Ministerial Council created by the Treaty. The Treaty stipulated that this division of the Zone of Cooperation did not affect the ability for Australia and Indonesia to reach a permanent boundary agreement, and both parties should continue efforts to do so.

=== Area A — Shared Zone ===
Area A was administered by a Ministerial Council and a Joint Authority, which were responsible for the activities and allocation of resources in the Area. The Ministerial Council oversaw all matters concerning the Area, including the supervision of the Joint Authority. The Joint Authority performed a practical role in managing the activities of the Area.

Part III of the Treaty outlined the function and structure of the Ministerial Council. Article 6(1) stipulated that the Ministerial Council held "overall responsibility for all matters relating to the exploration for and the exploitation of the petroleum resources in Area A of the Zone of Cooperation", including any policy making. A number of measures were put in place to ensure that the Ministerial Council held equal representation of both parties. An equal number of ministers from each nation were appointed to sit on the Council. Article 5(5) of the Treaty required that all decisions made by the Ministerial Council were achieved by unanimity. The location of the annual meetings that were held by the Council also alternated between Indonesia and Australia. The first annual meeting was held in 1991 in Bali, Indonesia and was attended by two ministers from each nation.

The function and structure of the Joint Authority was found in Part IV of the Treaty. The Joint Authority was directly accountable to the Ministerial Council and was required to perform under its direction. Article 8 outlined that the Joint Authority was responsible for “the management of activities relating to exploration for and exploitation of the petroleum resources in Area A”. One of its largest roles was to enter into Production Sharing Contracts with corporations, under Article 8(b) of the Treaty. These contracts allowed companies to exploit oil resources in the Area. The Joint Authority supervised the behaviour of these companies to ensure all activities were pursuant to the Treaty's Petroleum Mining Code. A sample Production Sharing Contract was provided in Annex C of the Treaty. The Joint Authority was unable to enter into or terminate any contracts without the approval of the Ministerial Council. All activities of the Joint Authority were originally funded by Australia and Indonesia, but were intended to eventually be supported by the revenues generated by any mining in Area A.

These responsibilities of the Joint Authority were equally shared between Australia and Indonesia. The executive board consisted of one executive director from each nation (which were appointed by the Ministerial Council) and one director of each of the four functions of the Authority: Technical, Financial, Corporate Services and Legal. The directors of the Technical and Financial functions could not be representatives from the same nation, as these were the two most important functions of the Authority. Agreement had to be reached by both parties on every decision. If no agreement could be made, the matter was referred to the Ministerial Council. The Joint Authority had offices in both Darwin, Australia and Jakarta, Indonesia.

== International Court of Justice proceedings ==
In 1991, Portugal brought proceedings against Australia in the International Court of Justice (ICJ) in regards to the Timor Gap Treaty. Portugal argued that by being a party to the Treaty, Australia had violated the right to self determination of the East Timorese population, and had disregarded Portugal's status as the administering authority of East Timor. The ICJ handed down its judgement on 30 June 1995. It ruled that no case was able to be brought against Australia without also considering Indonesia's role as a Treaty party. To decide whether Indonesia could lawfully enter into treaties on behalf of the East Timorese population, the Court would have been required to determine whether Indonesia's invasion of East Timor was lawful. The Court ruled 14 to 2 that this decision could not be made without Indonesia's consent as they were an indispensable third party. Portugal's claim were dismissed.

Judge Weeramantry and Judge Skubiszewski dissented the decision. Judge Skubiszewski condemned the ruling of the court, stating that "recognition of annexation erodes self-determination", and the court's adherence to legal correctness alone had been to the detriment of justice and was "cause for concern".

== Effect of East Timor's independence on the treaty ==
East Timor gained independence from Indonesia in 1999. On 25 October 1999, The United Nations Transitional Administration in East Timor (UNTAET) was created by the Security Council Resolution 1272 to help East Timor transfer to a self governing territory. Had East Timor transitioned to independence immediately without UN administration, customary international law dictates that the nation would have “start[ed] with a clean slate in the matter of treaty obligations”. East Timor would not have been required to assume the treaty obligations of Indonesia.

However, Resolution 1272 gave extensive treaty-making power to the UNTAET, allowing the UN (via the UNTAET) to replace Indonesia as Australia's treaty party, until East Timor transitioned to complete independence. On 5 July 2001, this arrangement was formalised in a Memorandum of Understanding that established the Joint Petroleum Development Area (JPDA). The JPDA covered the same area as the Zone of Cooperation. This agreement was incorporated into Australian law in the Timor Gap Treaty (Transitional Arrangements) Act 2000 (Cth).

== Current position ==
The Timor Gap Treaty was replaced by the Timor Sea Treaty between the Government of East Timor and the Government of Australia (Timor Sea Treaty). On 20 May 2002, The Timor Sea Treaty was signed in Dili by the Australian Prime Minister at the time, John Howard, and the then East Timorese Prime Minister, Mari Alkatiri. This was the same day that East Timor gained independence from UN rule (as Timor-Leste). This new treaty created only one zone. Revenue from that zone was divided 10% to Australia and 90% to Timor-Leste.

In April 2016, Timor-Leste brought conciliation proceedings against Australia under Annex V of the UNCLOS with the intent of establishing permanent maritime boundaries. A UNCLOS Conciliation Commission considered the matter and was able to solve the boundary disputes of each party. Following the proceedings, the Treaty between Australia and the Democratic Republic of Timor-Leste Establishing their Maritime Boundaries in the Timor Sea (Maritime Boundaries Treaty) was drafted. The Maritime Boundaries Treaty was signed on 9 March 2018 at the UN Headquarters in New York by the Foreign Ministers of Australia and Timor-Leste. This treaty established permanent maritime boundaries between East Timor and Australia and a framework for resource development.

The Timor Sea Treaty was terminated on 30 August 2019 when the Maritime Boundaries Treaty came into force.

== See also ==
- Timor Gap
- Timor Sea
- Timor Sea Treaty
- History of Timor-Leste
- Australia-Indonesia border
- Australia–Timor-Leste spying scandal
