= Australia–Timor-Leste spying scandal =

2004 bugging of Timor-Leste PM's office

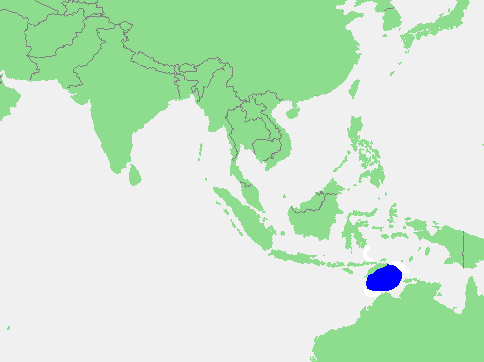
The Timor Sea (blue) is a rich source of oil and natural gas

The Australia–Timor-Leste spying scandal began in 2004 when the Australian Secret Intelligence Service (ASIS) clandestinely planted covert listening devices in a room adjacent to the Timor-Leste (East Timor) Prime Minister's Office at Dili, to obtain information in order to ensure Australia held the upper hand in negotiations with Timor-Leste over the rich oil and gas fields in the Timor Gap. Even though the Timor-Leste government was unaware of the espionage operation undertaken by Australia, negotiations were hostile. The first Prime Minister of Timor-Leste, Mari Alkatiri, bluntly accused the Howard government of plundering the oil and gas in the Timor Sea, stating:

"Timor-Leste loses $1 million a day due to Australia's unlawful exploitation of resources in the disputed area. Timor-Leste cannot be deprived of its rights or territory because of a crime."

Australian Foreign Minister Alexander Downer responded:

"I think they've made a very big mistake thinking that the best way to handle this negotiation is trying to shame Australia, is mounting abuse on our country...accusing us of being bullying and rich and so on, when you consider all we've done for East Timor."

"Witness K", a former senior ASIS intelligence officer who led the bugging operation, confidentially noted in 2012 the Australian Government had accessed top-secret high-level discussions in Dili and exploited this during negotiations of the Treaty on Certain Maritime Arrangements in the Timor Sea (CMATS), which superseded the Timor Sea Treaty and restricted further sea claims by Timor-Leste until 2057. Lead negotiator for Timor-Leste, Peter Galbraith, laid out the motives behind the espionage by ASIS:

"What would be the most valuable thing for Australia to learn is what our bottom line is, what we were prepared to settle for. There's another thing that gives you an advantage, you know what the instructions the prime minister has given to the lead negotiator. And finally, if you're able to eavesdrop you'll know about the divisions within the East Timor delegation and there certainly were divisions, different advice being given, so you might be able to lean on one way or another in the course of the negotiations."

Prime Minister Xanana Gusmão found out about the bugging, and in December 2012 told Australian Prime Minister Julia Gillard that he knew of the operation and wanted the treaty invalidated as a breach of "good faith" had occurred during the treaty negotiations. Gillard did not agree to invalidate the treaty. The first public allegation about espionage in Timor-Leste in 2004 appeared in 2013 in an official government press release and subsequent interviews by Australian Foreign Minister Bob Carr and Attorney-General Mark Dreyfus. A number of subsequent media reports detailed the alleged espionage.

When the espionage became known, Timor-Leste rejected the Timor Sea treaty, and referred the matter to the International Court of Justice (ICJ) in The Hague. Timor's lawyers, including Bernard Collaery, intended to call Witness K as a confidential witness in an in camera hearing in March 2014. However, in December 2013 the homes and office of both Witness K and his lawyer Bernard Collaery were raided and searched by ASIO and Australian Federal Police, and many legal documents were confiscated. Timor-Leste immediately sought an order from the ICJ for the sealing and return of the documents.

In March 2014, the ICJ ordered Australia to stop spying on Timor-Leste. The Permanent Court of Arbitration in The Hague considered claims by Timor-Leste over the territory until early 2017, when Timor-Leste dropped the ICJ case against Australia after the Australian Government agreed to renegotiate. In 2018, the parties signed a new agreement which gave 80% of the profits to Timor-Leste and 20% to Australia.

The identity of Witness K has been kept secret under the provisions of the Intelligence Services Act and any person in breach of this could face prosecution.

In June 2018 the Commonwealth Director of Public Prosecutions filed criminal charges against Witness K and his lawyer Bernard Collaery under the National Security Information (NSI) Act which was introduced in 2004 to deal with classified and sensitive material in court cases. In June 2022, Witness K, who had pleaded guilty, was sentenced to a three-month suspended term of imprisonment and a 12-month good behaviour order. Pre-trial proceedings continued until July 2022, when Collaery's prosecution was discontinued by Attorney-General Mark Dreyfus.

On 9 February 2022 ABC reports that documents filed in court claims that Australia may have been monitoring the phone calls of political leaders in Timor-Leste since 2000.

== Background ==
In 2002, the Australian Government withdrew from the United Nations Convention on the Law of the Sea (UNCLOS) clauses which could bind Australia to a decision of the Permanent Court of Arbitration in The Hague on matters of territorial disputes. Two months later, Timor-Leste officially gained its independence from Indonesia. In 2004, Timor-Leste began negotiating territorial borders with Australia. In response to this, ASIS used an Australian aid project to infiltrate the Palace of Government in Dili and install listening devices in the walls of the cabinet room. This enabled ASIS to obtain top-secret information from treaty negotiators led by Prime Minister Mari Alkatiri. This provided the Australian Government with "an advantage during treaty talks". The installation of listening devices occurred 18 months after the 2002 Bali bombings, during a time of heightened ASIS activity in the Southeast Asia region. In 2006, Australia and Timor-Leste signed the second CMats treaty.

Before the revelations of ASIS's clandestine activities in Timor-Leste, the treaty between Timor-Leste and Australia was ridiculed. Over 50 members of the US Congress sent a letter to Prime Minister John Howard calling for a "fair" and "equitable" resolution of the border dispute, noting Timor-Leste's poverty. Signatories included Nancy Pelosi, Rahm Emanuel and Patrick J. Kennedy. Witness K made the Australian Government's spying activities public after the Inspector-General of Intelligence and Security (IGIS) recommended he do so.

David Irvine, ASIS head (2003–2009) authorised the operation. His successor Nick Warner, ASIS head (2009–2017), assisted in an advisory role. Foreign Minister Alexander Downer, who oversaw ASIS was overseas during the operation. According to the lawyer of Witness K, former ACT Attorney-General Bernard Collaery, successive Australian Governments from both major parties have actively sought to cover-up the incident.

Witness K revealed the bugging operation in 2012 after learning Foreign Minister Alexander Downer had become an adviser to Woodside Petroleum, which was benefiting from the treaty.

== Reaction to the allegation ==
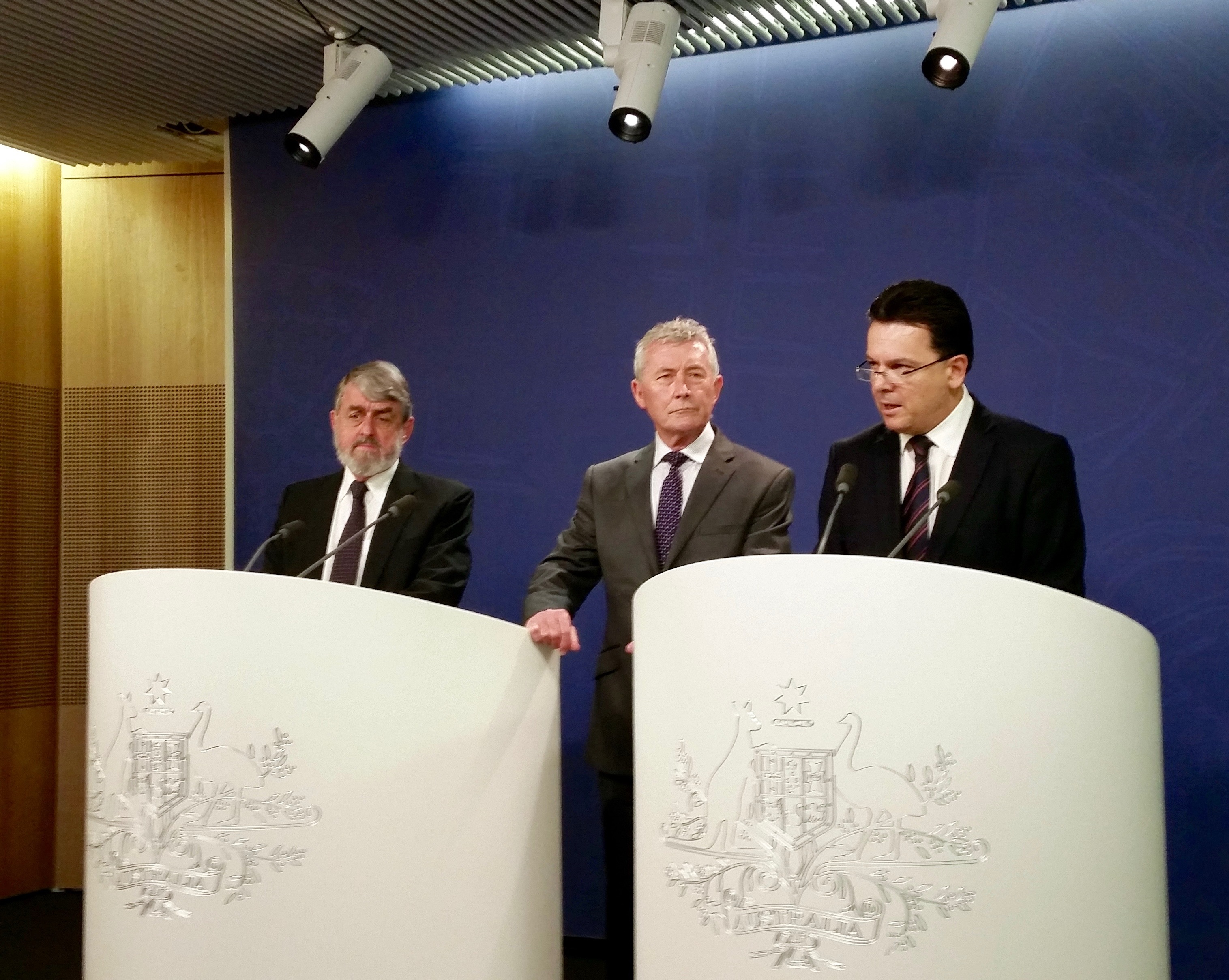
Senator Nick Xenophon (right) with Bernard Collaery (centre) and his lawyer Nicholas Cowdery QC (left) calling for a royal commission into the bugging scandal in November 2015.

The Gillard government, in response to a letter sent by Timor-Leste's Prime Minister Xanana Gusmão requesting an explanation and a bilateral resolution to the dispute, authorised the installation of listening devices in Collaery's Canberra office. After the story became public in 2012, the Gillard government inflamed tensions with Timor-Leste by denying the alleged facts of the dispute and sending as a representative to Dili someone who was known by Gusmão to have been involved in the bugging. In 2015, Gusmão said of Prime Minister Julia Gillard's response:

"It meant that the Prime Minister of a modern democracy on Timor-Leste's doorstep [Australia] did not know what her intelligence service was doing."

The response of the Gillard government led to Timor-Leste's application to have the case heard in the Permanent Court of Arbitration. According to Gusmão, during a 2014 meeting in Bo'ao, China, Prime Minister Tony Abbott shrugged off Timor-Leste's concerns over the spying scandal by telling Mr. Gusmão not to worry because "[the] Chinese are listening to us". In 2015, the bugging scandal received renewed interest after the Australian Broadcasting Corporation ran a story revealing the level of concern amongst senior intelligence officials in the Australian intelligence apparatus. Attorney-General George Brandis, under lengthy questioning by a panel of Australian senators, admitted that new national security laws could enable prosecution of Witness K and his lawyer, Collaery. Further, Australia's Solicitor General, Justin Gleeson SC, claimed in a submission to the ICJ that Witness K and Collaery could have breached parts of the Criminal Code pertaining to espionage and could be stripped of their Australian citizenship if they are dual-nationals (as, indeed, Collaery is). Foreign Minister Julie Bishop said in April 2016 that: "We stand by the existing treaties, which are fair and consistent with international law."

In August 2016, the Turnbull government indicated it will consider any decision made by the Permanent Court of Arbitration binding. Some suggested this "softening" was linked to the territorial dispute over the South China Sea between China and neighbouring states. The Timor-Leste government continued to press Australia for an equidistant border between the two countries. In 2016, the Australian Labor Party said a new deal could be struck between Timor-Leste and Australia if it formed government.

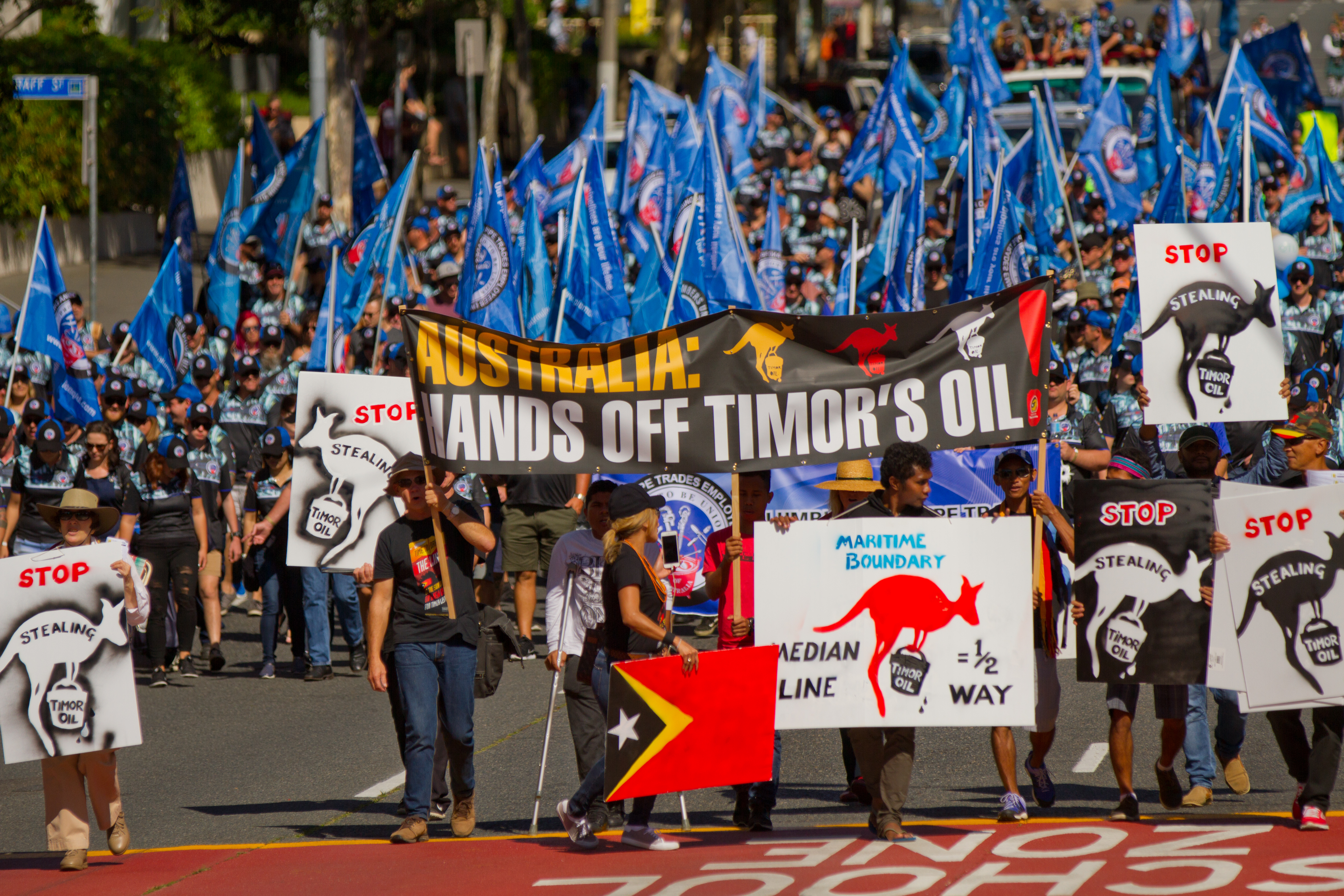
Protesters in Brisbane protesting Australia's claim on East Timorese oil, May 2017

In September 2016, The Age newspaper in Australia published an editorial claiming Timor-Leste's attempts to resolve this matter in international courts "is an appeal to Australians' sense of fairness".

On 26 September 2016, Labor Foreign Affairs spokesperson Senator Penny Wong said, "In light of this ruling [that the court can hear Timor-Leste's claims], we call on the government to now settle this dispute in fair and permanent terms; it is in both our national interests to do so". To date (March 2018), the Australian government has not officially acknowledged the spying claims.

"Just as we fought so hard and suffered so much for our independence, Timor-Leste will not rest until we have our sovereign rights over both land and sea," Gusmão, 26 September 2016.

Witness K had his passport seized in 2013. As Collaery has pointed out, such security assessments are usually conducted by ASIO and not, as in the case of Witness K, by ASIS. In 2018, despite having approval from the Director-General of ASIO to apply for a passport, ASIS and the Turnbull government denied Witness K right to obtain a passport citing national security. His lawyer maintained that this was "pure retaliation" and that Witness K remained in "effective house arrest" in Australia.

== ASIO raids ==
Three months after the election of the Abbott government in 2013, ASIS was authorised by Attorney-General George Brandis to raid the office of Bernard Collaery and the home of Witness K, whose passport was seized. Brandis said that he authorised the ASIO raids to protect Australia's national security. Collaery, who represented the East Timorese government in the dispute with the Australian Government over the bugging of cabinet offices during the negotiations for a petroleum and gas treaty in 2004, alleged that two agents from the Australian Security Intelligence Organisation (ASIO) raided his Canberra office and seized his electronic and paper files. The seizing of Witness K's passport prevented him from appearing as a witness in Timor-Leste's case against Australia at the Permanent Court of Arbitration in The Hague. Collaery said Witness K's ability to travel overseas and appear before The Hague was crucial to Timor-Leste's case.

The passport of Witness K remains confiscated as of April 2020.

== International law ==
=== International Court of Justice ===
On 4 March 2014, in response to an East Timorese request for the indication of provisional measures, the International Court of Justice (ICJ) ordered Australia not to interfere with communications between Timor-Leste and its legal advisors in the arbitral proceedings and related matters. The case was officially removed from ICJ's case list on 12 June 2015 after Timor-Leste confirmed that Australia had handed back its property. The Timor-Leste representative stated that "[f]ollowing the return of the seized documents and data by Australia on 12 May 2015, Timor-Leste [has] successfully achieved the purpose of its Application to the Court, namely the return of Timor-Leste’s rightful property, and therefore implicit recognition by Australia that its actions were in violation of Timor-Leste’s sovereign rights".

=== Permanent Court of Arbitration ===
In 2013, Timor-Leste launched a case at the Permanent Court of Arbitration in The Hague to withdraw from a gas treaty that it had signed with Australia on the grounds that ASIS had bugged the East Timorese cabinet room in Dili in 2004.

In April 2016, Timor-Leste began proceedings in the Permanent Court of Arbitration under UNCLOS over the sea border it shares with Australia. The Australian Department of Foreign Affairs and Trade released a statement condemning the move, which it said was contrary to the previous treaties it had lawfully signed and implemented. Timor-Leste believed much of the Greater Sunrise oil field fell under its territory and that it had lost $US5 billion to Australian companies as a result of the treaty it was disputing. Hearings before the court commenced on 29 August 2016. The court dismissed Australia's claim that it did not have jurisdiction to hear the case on 26 September 2016.

In early 2017, Timor-Leste withdrew the case against Australia after the Australian government agreed to renegotiate. In 2018, the parties signed a new agreement that was far more favourable to Timor-Leste which is now expected to reap between 70% and 80% of total revenue.

== See also ==
- Australia–Timor-Leste relations
- Treaty on Certain Maritime Arrangements in the Timor Sea
- Australia–Indonesia spying scandal
- The Thing (listening device)
