= Timor Sea =

Sea between Malay Archipelago and Australia

- Laut Timor (Indonesian); Mar de Timor (Portuguese); Tasi Mane / Tasi Timór (Tetun)
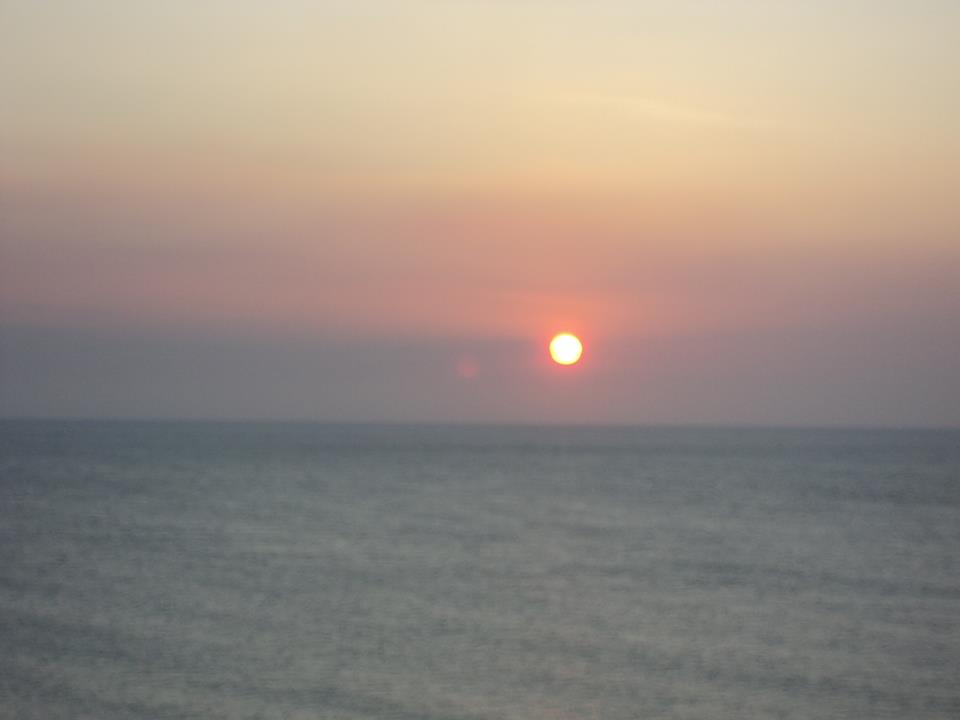
- The Timor Sea at Vessoru, Timor-Leste
- Interactive map of Timor Sea
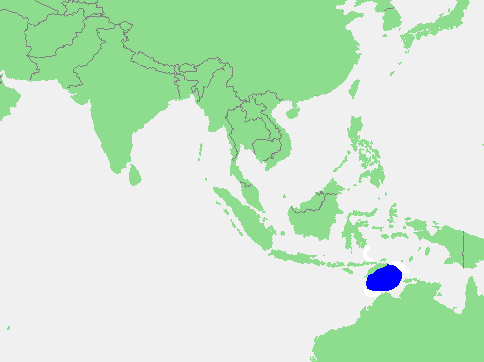
- Location of the Timor Sea
- Location: Eastern Indian Ocean, Asia, Oceania
- Coordinates: 10°S 127°E
- Type: Sea
- Etymology: Timor Island
- Part of: Indian Ocean
- Ocean/sea sources: Indian Ocean
- Basin countries: Indonesia; Timor-Leste; Australia
- Surface area: 610,000 km^{2} (240,000 sq mi)
- Average depth: 406 m (1,332 ft)
- Max. depth: 3,300 m (10,800 ft)
- Islands: Ashmore and Cartier Islands, Browse Island, Tiwi Islands
- Trenches: Timor Trough
- Settlements: Darwin, Northern Territory

The Timor Sea (Indonesian: Laut Timor; Portuguese: Mar de Timor; Tetun: Tasi Mane or Tasi Timór) is a relatively shallow sea in the Indian Ocean bounded to the north by the island of Timor with Timor-Leste to the north, Indonesia to the northwest, Arafura Sea to the east, and to the south by Australia. The Sunda Trench marks the deepest point of the Timor Sea with a depth of more than 3300 metres, separating the continents of Oceania in the southeast and Asia to the northwest and north. The Timor sea is prone to earthquakes and tsunamis north of the Sunda Trench, due to its location on the Ring of Fire as well as volcanic activity and can experience major cyclones, due to the proximity from the Equator.

The sea contains a number of reefs, uninhabited islands and significant hydrocarbon reserves. International disputes emerged after the reserves were discovered resulting in the signing of the Timor Sea Treaty.

The Timor Sea was hit by the worst oil spill for 25 years in 2009.

It is possible that Australia's first inhabitants crossed the Timor Sea from the Malay Archipelago at a time when sea levels were lower.

== Etymology ==
The Timor Sea is named after Timor, the island on the other side of the sea's northern coastline. The island's name is a variant of timur, Malay for "east".

In Tetum, the sea is often referred to by the expression tasi mane (lit. transl. 'male sea'). The counterpart of that body of water, the 'Ombai-Wetar Strait', which has smaller waves, is less turbid, and washes most of Timor island's northern shores, is commonly referred to in Tetum as tasi feto (lit. transl. 'female sea').

== Geography ==
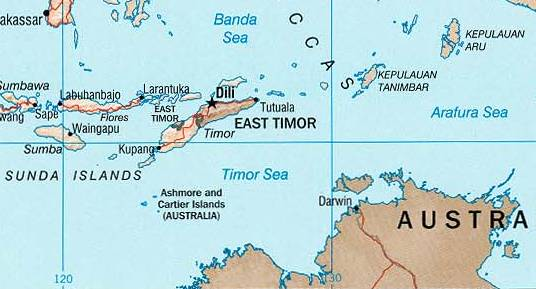
Timor Sea and neighbouring seas

The waters to the east are known as the Arafura Sea. The Timor Sea is adjacent to three substantial inlets on the north Australian coast, the Joseph Bonaparte Gulf, Beagle Gulf and the Van Diemen Gulf. The Australian city of Darwin which is located in part on the shore of the Beagle Gulf, is the nearest large city to the sea. The small town of Wyndham is located on the west arm of Cambridge Gulf, an inlet of Joseph Bonaparte Gulf.

Rivers that enter the Timor Sea from the Northern Territory include Fish River, King River, Dry River, Victoria River and the Alligator Rivers. Rivers in the Kimberley region that flows into the Timor Sea include the Ord River, Forrest River, Pentecost River and Durack River.

The sea is about 480 km (300 mi) wide, covering an area of about 610 thousand km^{2} (240,000 mi^{2}). Its deepest point is the Timor Trough (which some geologists consider to be the south-eastern extension of the Java Trench, but others view it as a foreland trough to the Timor Island "mountain range"), located in the northern part of the sea, which reaches a depth of 3,300 m (10,800 ft). The remainder of the sea is much shallower, much of it averaging less than 200 m (660 ft) deep, as it overlies the Sahul Shelf, part of the Australian continental shelf.

The Big Bank Shoals is an area on the sloping seabed between the continental shelf and the Timor Trough where a number of submerged banks are located. The ecosystem of the shoals differs significantly from the deeper waters surrounding them. In May 2010, it was announced that a crater about 50 km (31 mi) wide has been discovered on the seabed of the Timor Sea.

=== Extent ===
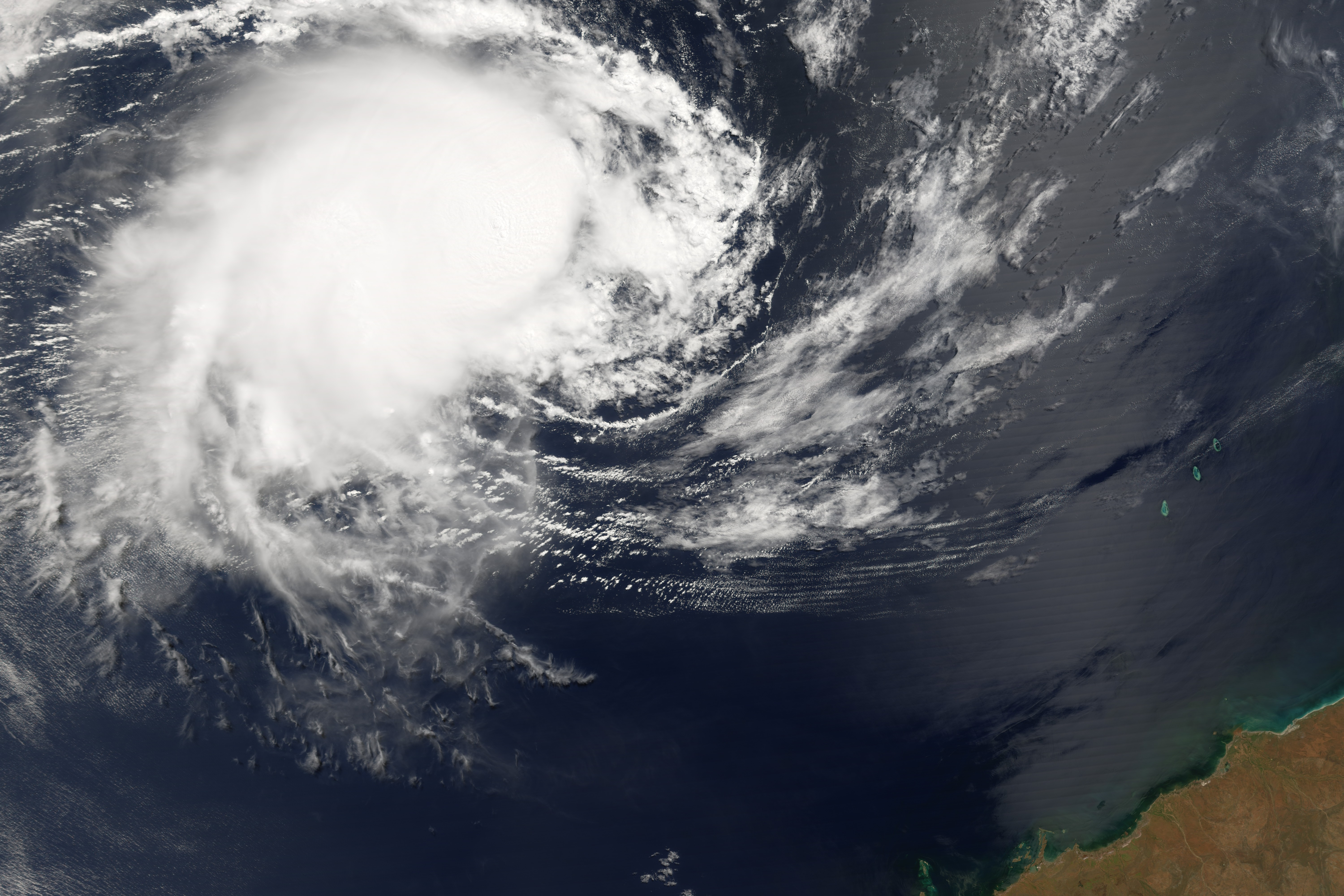
Tropical cyclone Floyd over the Timor Sea, 2006

The International Hydrographic Organization (IHO) defines the Timor Sea as being one of the waters of the East Indian Archipelago. The IHO defines its limits as follows:

On the North The Southeastern limit of the Savu Sea [By a line from the Southwest point of Timor to the Northeast point of Roti, through this island to its Southwest point] the Southeastern coast of Timor and the Southern limit of the Banda Sea [A line from Tanjong Aro Oesoe, through Sermata to Tanjong Njadora the Southeast point of Lakov (8°16′S 128°14′E) along the South coasts of Lakov, Moa and Leti Islands to Tanjong Toet Pateh, the West point of Leti, thence a line to Tanjong Sewirawa the Eastern extremity of Timor].

On the East. The Western [limit] of the Arafura Sea [A line from Cape Don to Tanjong Aro Oesoe, the Southern point of Selaroe (Tanimbar Islands)].

On the South. The North coast of Australia from Cape Don to Cape Londonderry (13°47′S 126°55′E).

On the West. A line from Cape Londonderry to the Southwest point of Roti Island (10°56′S 122°48′E).

=== Meteorology ===
Many tropical storms and cyclones originate or pass through the Timor Sea. In February 2005, Tropical Cyclone Vivienne disrupted oil and gas production facilities in the area, and the next month, Severe Tropical Cyclone Willy interrupted production. Petroleum production facilities are designed to withstand the effects of cyclones, although as a safety precaution production work is often reduced or temporarily halted and workers evacuated by helicopter to the mainland – usually to Darwin or Dili.

=== Reefs and islands ===
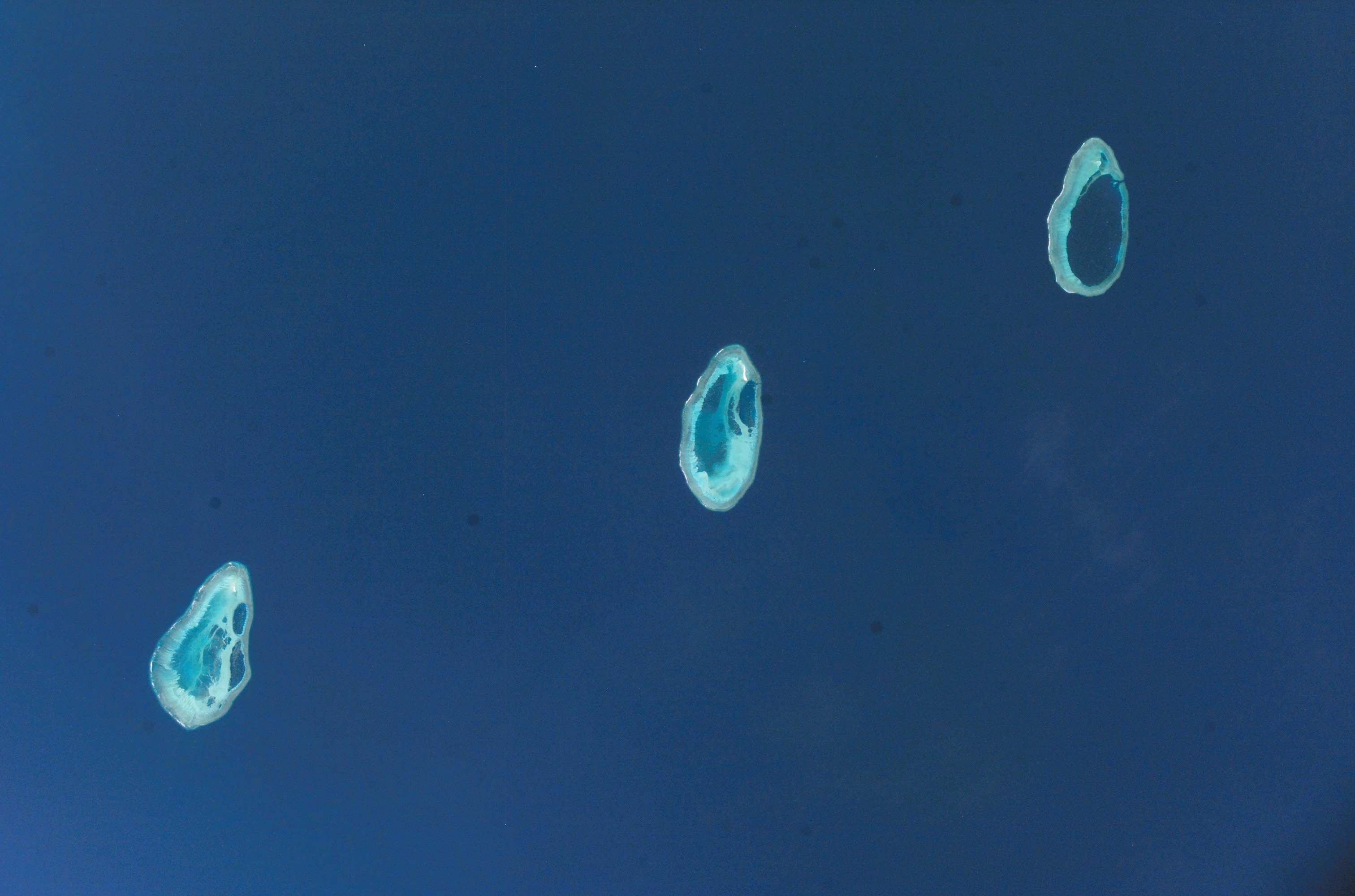
August 2005 NASA satellite photograph of the Rowley Shoals

A number of significant islands are located in the sea, notably Melville Island, part of the Tiwi Islands, off Australia and the Australian-governed Ashmore and Cartier Islands. It is thought that early humans reached Australia by "island-hopping" across the Timor Sea.

Scott and Seringapatam Reefs formed in the area and to the west, on the same underwater platform, are the Rowley Shoals.

== History ==
=== World War II ===
During the 1940s the Japanese navy conducted air raids on Australia from ships in the Timor Sea. On the 19 February 1942 the Japanese aircraft carrier Kaga with other vessels, launched air strikes against Darwin, Australia, sinking nine ships, including the USS Peary. This bombing marked the beginning of the Battle of Timor in the Pacific theatre of World War II.

== Hydrology ==
=== Timor Current ===
The Timor Current is an oceanic current that runs south-west in the Timor Sea between the Malay Archipelago and Australia. It is a major contributor to the Indonesian Throughflow that transports water from the Pacific Ocean to the Indian Ocean.

== Hydrocarbon reserves ==
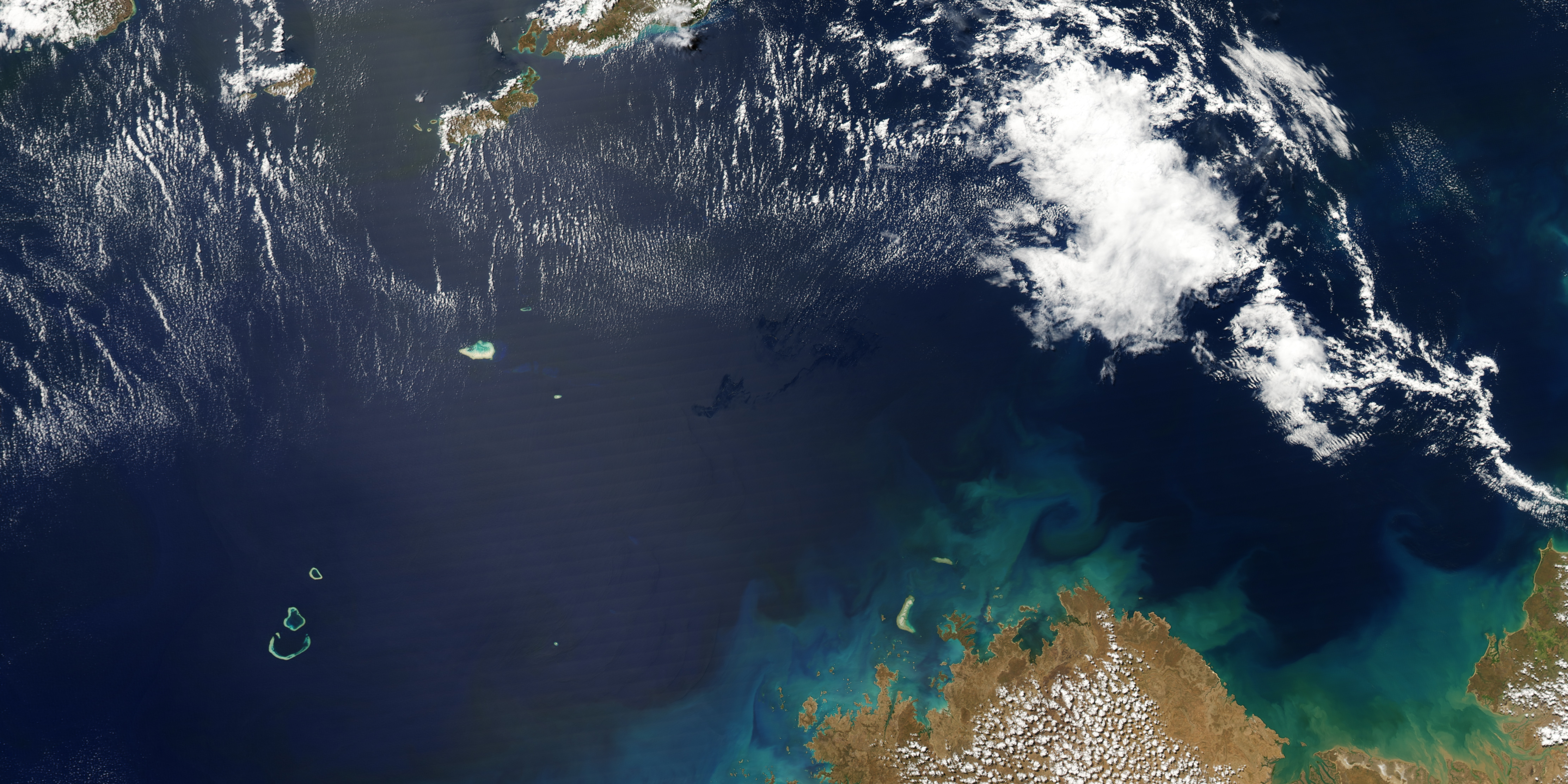
Oil slick from the Montara oil spill in the Timor Sea September 2009.

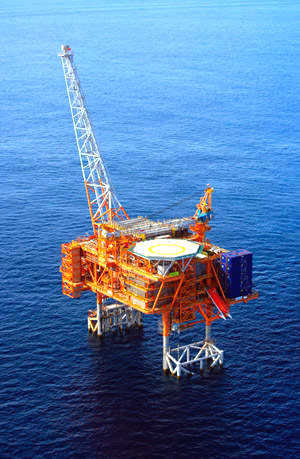
Big John

Beneath the Timor Sea lie considerable reserves of oil and gas. Confirmation of the prospectivity of the Timor Sea came when Woodside-Burmah's Big John rig drilled Troubadour No. 1 well in June 1974 on the Troubadour Shoals about 200 kilometres (120 mi) southeast of Timor, and intersected 83 metres (272 ft) of hydrocarbons. A number of offshore petroleum projects are in operation and there is considerable exploration activity either underway and numerous proposed projects. A gas pipeline crosses the Timor Sea from the Joint Petroleum Development Area to Wickham Point near Darwin.

The Timor Sea was the location for Australia's largest oil spill when the Montara oil field leaked oil, natural gas and condensate from 21 August to 3 November 2009. During the spill 400 barrels (64 m^{3}) of oil leaked each day. The Montara Commission of Inquiry placed blame on the Thai company PTTEP, owner of the wells. In response to the disaster, Indonesian seaweed farmers engaged in a class action lawsuit to claim for damages.

=== Bayu-Undan project ===
The largest petroleum project in operation in the Timor Sea is the Bayu-Undan project operated by Santos. The Bayu-Undan field is located approximately 500 km (310 mi) north-west of Darwin in the Bonaparte Basin. Production commenced in 2004 as a gas recycle project – with liquids (condensate, propane and butane) being stripped from the raw production stream and exported. Gas was pumped back down into the reservoir. At around the same time, construction commenced on a 500 km (310 mi) subsea natural gas pipeline connecting the Bayu-Undan processing facility to a liquefied natural gas plant situated at Wickham Point in Darwin harbour. Since the completion of the pipeline and the Darwin LNG plant in 2005, gas produced offshore at Bayu-Undan is now transported to the Darwin plant where it is converted into a liquid and transported to Japan under long-term sales contracts. Timor-Leste has made, as of 2017, over $18 billion from Bayu-Undan since production began; however, it is predicted its reserves will be exhausted by 2023.

=== Ichthys gas field ===
The Ichthys gas field is a natural gas field located in the Timor Sea, off the northwestern coast of Australia. The field is located 220 km offshore Western Australia and 820 km southwest of Darwin, with an average water depth of approximately 250 metres. It was discovered in 2000. First Gas from the Ichthys field was achieved on 30 July 2018.

=== Other projects ===
AED Oil owns the large oil project at Puffin oilfield and Woodside Petroleum previously produced oil at the Laminaria oil field. The Greater Sunrise gas field, discovered in 1974, is one of the largest in the area and is expected to earn East Timor several billion dollars in royalty revenues. Woodside Petroleum plans to process gas from Greater Sunrise via a floating platform, however Xanana Gusmão, East Timor's Prime Minister opposes this plan and instead wants the gas to go to Beaço via a pipeline for processing.

Since 2018, Santos has sought to establish the Barossa offshore gas project to exploit a gas field in order to supply the Darwin liquefield natural gas (LNG) onshore terminal when gas from Bayu-Undan runs out in the 2020s. This has been opposed by Dangalaba and Larrakia people as well as climate justice organisations.

== Territorial dispute ==
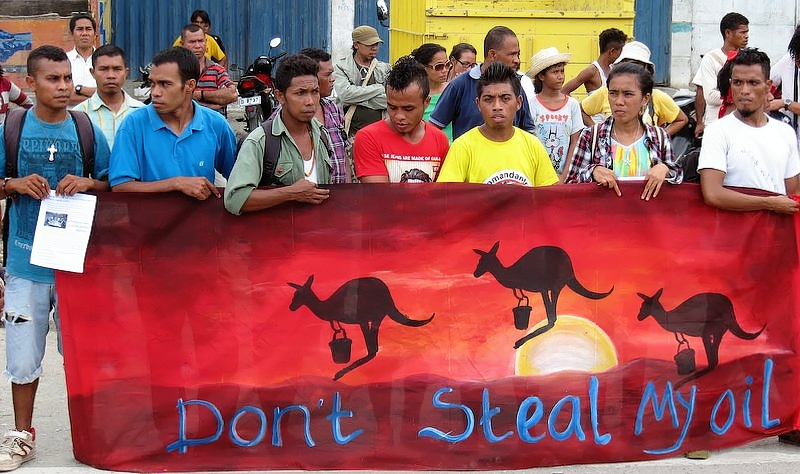
Demonstration against Australia in December 2013

Since the discovery of petroleum in the Timor Sea in the 1970s, there have been disputes surrounding the rights to ownership and exploitation of the resources situated in a part of the Timor Sea known as the Timor Gap, which is the area of the Timor Sea which lies outside the territorial boundaries of the nations to the north and south of the Timor Sea. These disagreements initially involved Australia and Indonesia, although a resolution was eventually reached in the form of the Timor Gap Treaty. After declaration of East Timor's nationhood in 1999, the terms of the Timor Gap Treaty were abandoned and negotiations commenced between Australia and Timor-Leste, culminating in the Timor Sea Treaty.

From 1965 to 2018, Australia's territorial claim extended to the bathymetric axis (the line of greatest sea-bed depth) at the Timor Trough. It overlapped Timor-Leste's own territorial claim, which followed the former colonial power Portugal and the United Nations Convention on the Law of the Sea in claiming that the dividing line should be midway between the two countries. In 2018, Australia agreed to a median line boundary.

It was revealed in 2013 that the Australian Secret Intelligence Service (ASIS) planted listening devices to listen to Timor-Leste during negotiations over the Greater Sunrise oil and gasfields. This is known as the Australia–East Timor spying scandal.

=== Timor Sea Treaty ===
The Timor Sea Treaty, which was signed on the 20 May 2002, led to the establishment of the Timor Sea Designated Authority (TSDA). This organisation is responsible for the administration of all petroleum-related activities in a part of the Timor Sea known as the Joint Petroleum Development Area (JPDA). The treaty was ratified in February 2007.

Under the terms of the treaty, royalties on petroleum production in the JPDA are split in a 90:10 ratio between Timor-Leste and Australia. It has been criticised because the treaty did not finalise the maritime boundary between East Timor and Australia.

=== 2018 Maritime Boundaries Treaty ===
The Australia–Timor Leste Treaty Establishing Their Maritime Boundaries in the Timor Sea was signed on 6 March 2018 at United Nations headquarters in New York in the presence of United Nations Secretary-General Antonio Guterres.

== See also ==
- Banda Sea
- The great Jukung race
