= Dry River (Northern Territory) =

Dry
- Location of the Dry River mouth in the Northern Territory

Location
- Country: Australia
- Territory: Northern Territory
- Region: Katherine Region

Physical characteristics
- Source
  - location: Tinker Hill, Sturt Plateau, Australia
  - elevation: 206 m (676 ft)
- Mouth
  - location: King River, Australia
  - coordinates: 14°53′40″S 132°24′9″E
  - elevation: 128 m (420 ft)
- Length: 271 km (168 mi)
- Basin size: 3,000 km^{2} (1,200 sq mi)

Basin features
- River system: King River

The Dry River is a river in the Northern Territory of Australia.

The headwaters of the river rise under Tinker Hill in the Fitzgerald Range just north of Birrimba Station homestead. The river floes in a north easterly direction moving across the mostly uninhabited plains through Dry River Station and then discharges into the King River, of which it is a tributary, and eventually flows into the Timor Sea.

The only tributary of the Dry River is Forrest Creek.

The river's catchment covers an area of 3,000 square kilometres (1,158 sq mi). The eastern parts of the catchment are bounded by the Sturt Plateau. Upper parts of the river have been described as weakly developed.

Western Creek was once a major tributary of the Dry River but it now flows into Elsey Creek. There are a number of waterholes which are permanent on the black soil plains of the river.

== See also ==
- List of rivers of Australia § Northern Territory
