= King River (Northern Territory) =

Coordinates: 14.6950°S 131.9803°E

King

Location
- Country: Australia
- State: Northern Territory
- Region: Katherine Region

Basin features
- River system: Daly River
- Tributaries
  - right: Dry River

The King River is a river in the Northern Territory of Australia. It is a tributary of the Daly River, which ultimately flows into the Timor Sea.

The Dry River is a tributary of the King River.

A telemetered gauging station is located on the river downstream from the Victoria Highway crossing. The maximum recorded flood height at this station was 13.959 m on 11 March 1974. It was originally used to investigate the water resources of the Northern Territory. It is now used as a flood warning site.

== See also ==
- List of rivers of Australia § Northern Territory
