= Sunrise International Unitization Agreement =

Treaty on gas and petroleum development

This agreement is officially known as the Agreement between the Government of Australia and the Government of the Democratic Republic of Timor-Leste relating to the Unitisation of the Sunrise and Troubadour Fields.

The Sunrise International Unitisation Agreement (Sunrise IUA) was made to enable the exploitation of the Sunrise and Troubador petroleum and gas fields in the Timor Sea, together known as the Greater Sunrise field. The Greater Sunrise field straddles the border between the joint petroleum development area (JPDA) established under the Timor Sea Treaty and Australian territorial waters as determined by the 1972 seabed boundary agreement between Australia and Indonesia. Unitisation of the field would enable it to be treated as one as far as exploitation, regulation, revenue taxation, management and other purposes are concerned, giving certainty to investors by providing a financial framework and international legal basis for development of the field.

The agreement deemed 20.1% of the resources of the Greater Sunrise field as lying within the JPDA, attributing 20.1% of production from it to the JPDA and 79.9% to Australia. With East Timor getting 90% of the revenue of the JPDA, it effectively was only going to receive 18.1% of the revenue from the field. This share ratio was amended to both Australia and East Timor getting equal share of the upstream revenue from the field with the signing of the Treaty on Certain Maritime Arrangements in the Timor Sea (CMATS) in 2006. By virtue of this, this agreement is "read together" with CMATS and the Timor Sea Treaty.

The Sunrise IUA was signed in Dili, East Timor on 6 March 2003 by then Australian Minister for Foreign Affairs Alexander Downer and Ana Pessoa, East Timor's Minister of State for the Presidency of the Council of Ministers. The agreement came into force on 23 February 2007 by virtue of the coming to force of CMATS on the same day.

== See also ==
- Treaty on Certain Maritime Arrangements in the Timor Sea (CMATS)
- Timor Sea Treaty
