= Timor Gap =

Area of the Timor Sea between Australia and Timor Island

Coordinates: 9°S 127°E

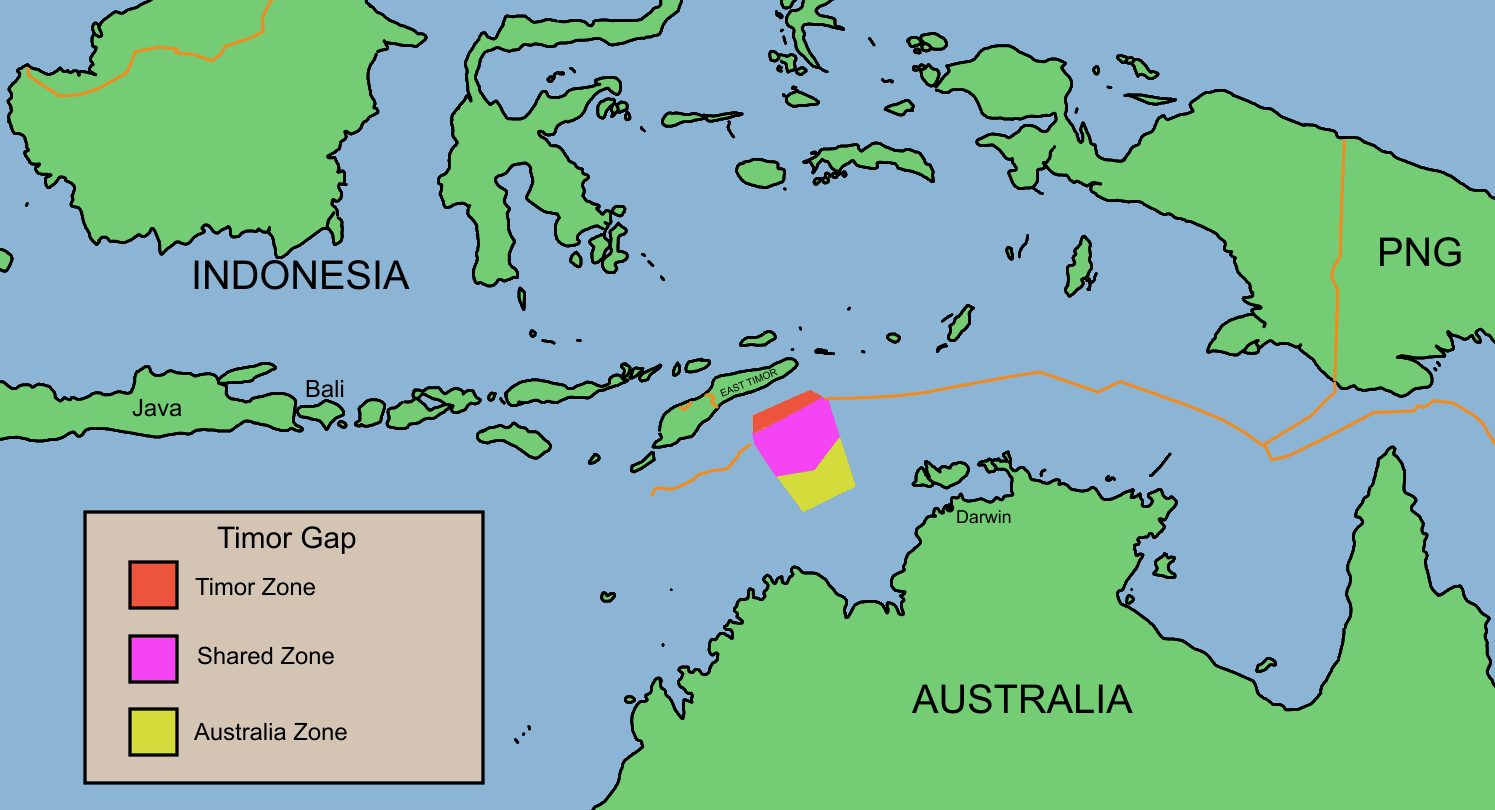
Timor Gap

The Timor Gap is an area of the Timor Sea between Australia and Timor-Leste. The area has been the subject of disputes over maritime boundaries, as well as the rights to extract and take revenue from its substantial petroleum reserves.

Australia and Portugal initially disputed the area when the latter governed East Timor. After the Indonesian occupation of East Timor, a joint development zone was created between Australia and Indonesia, which largely persisted after Timor-Leste achieved independence and took Indonesia's place in its administration. The maritime boundary between Australia and Timor-Leste was settled in 2018.

The Timor Gap is part of the Australia–Timor-Leste border, Australia–Indonesia border, and Indonesia–Timor-Leste border. It is 480 km (300 statute miles) wide.

== History ==
=== Background ===
Australia and Indonesia negotiated their maritime border in the Timor Sea in 1972 based on the extent of Australia's continental shelf. Portugal, which governed colonial East Timor at the time, declined to participate in negotiations until the UN Convention on the Law of the Sea was established, which would eventually see maritime rights based on a country's continental shelf become more limited. This resulted in the emergence of the 'Timor Gap', the area where the maritime boundary between Australia and then-Portuguese East Timor had not been settled.

=== Timor Gap Treaty ===
East Timor was invaded and annexed by Indonesia in 1975. This annexation was not recognised by the UN, the people of Timor nor by the Portuguese, who continued to see it as an illegally occupied territory. Indonesia was more willing to negotiate over East Timor's maritime area than Portugal had been, especially as this would require Australia's recognition of Indonesian sovereignty in the territory, but also had a much better understanding of the extent of the resource potential in the Timor Sea than they had previously.

In 1979 Australia formally recognised Indonesian sovereignty over East Timor, and the countries began negotiations over the Timor Gap. Indonesia was unwilling to 'fill' the gap based on the previous 1972 agreement, as international law had moved on from using the continental shelf to determine maritime boundaries. Unable to reach agreement on the location of a sea border, the two countries instead negotiated the establishment of a joint development zone in the area, dubbed the 'Zone of Cooperation'. This resulted in the Timor Gap Treaty in 1989, which split the petroleum revenue from the disputed shared zone 50:50, and created a complex scheme of joint administration.

On 30 August 1999 a UN sponsored referendum saw East Timor chose independence. On the 19th of January 2000 The UN Temporary Administration agency for East Timor UNTAET signed a Memorandum of Understanding with Australia to maintain the existing border agreement with Australia so as to allow continued development of the Timor Gap to ensure the financial future of the new country. The decision to maintain the historical agreement with Australia that had been negotiated by Indonesia caused great frustration to many Timorese.

Numerous negotiations to determine the ownership of the tens of billions of dollars' worth of oil and gas located on the seabed of the Timor Sea, including completing the undefined boundary known as the Timor Gap, were held between Australia and Timor-Leste from 2002 onwards. During this time Australia and international oil companies were accused of pressuring Timor-Leste to accept a petroleum revenue-sharing formula while deferring permanent boundary resolution and foregoing legal avenues.

=== Timor Sea Treaty ===
On its independence day, Timor-Leste signed the Timor Sea Treaty with Australia. This treaty practically puts Timor-Leste in the place of Indonesia in the Timor Gap Treaty, except that the ratio of revenue distribution in the Joint Petroleum Development Area, known as the Zone of Cooperation under the 1989 treaty, was changed to 90:10 in favour of Timor-Leste. The 2002 treaty provided for the future "unitisation" - treating a gas or oil field which straddles one or several borders as one unit - of the Greater Sunrise gas field, of which only 20% was located within the JPDA while the rest was deemed to be in Australian territory. In Timor-Leste's view, this distribution could be disputed as it did not recognise the borders, drawn between Australia and Indonesia, which placed the bulk of Greater Sunrise in Australian territory.

On 20 February 2007, Timor-Leste's parliament agreed to ratify the agreement with Australia over the management of oil and gas resources in the Greater Sunrise field in the Timor Sea. The Australian and Timor-Leste governments formally exchanged notes in Dili on 23 February 2007 to bring into force the two treaties that provided the legal and fiscal framework for the development of the Greater Sunrise gas field in the Timor Sea.

The notes covered the Sunrise International Unitization Agreement (Sunrise IUA) and the Treaty on Certain Maritime Arrangements in the Timor Sea (CMATS). Foreign Minister Alexander Downer, using a power invoked only six times in its history, invoked a "national interest" exemption clause to fast-track ratification of the CMATS treaty through the Parliament without scrutiny by its Joint Standing Committee on Treaties. and

=== 2018 Maritime Boundaries Treaty ===
On March 7, 2018, Australia and Timor-Leste announced that a treaty had been signed regarding the border and the exploitation of the Greater Sunrise gas field. The agreed boundary would follow the median line between the two countries. The 2018 Maritime Boundaries Treaty formalized the agreement reached by Australia and Timor Leste on their maritime boundaries. The two countries had failed to reach agreement on a preferred option for development of the Sunrise/Troubadour field, and annexes to the Treaty set out procedures for achieving this. Article 3 of the 2018 treaty on maritime boundaries between Australia and Timor-Leste provides for adjustment of the continental shelf boundary between the two countries following settlement of that boundary between Indonesia and Timor-Leste. If those countries agree to an endpoint to their continental shelf boundary west of point A18 on the 1972 Seabed Treaty Boundary, the continental shelf boundary between Australia and Timor-Leste shall be adjusted so that it proceeds in a geodesic line from point TA-2 in the 2018 Treaty (at 11° 24' 00.61" South and 126° 18' 22.48" East), to point A18 (at 18 10° 37' South and 125° 41' East). The Treaty provides that this shall not come into force before the commercial depletion of the Laminaria and Corallina Fields. In the event that a continental shelf boundary agreed between Timor-Leste and Indonesia meets the 1972 Seabed Treaty boundary at a point to the west of point A18 on the 1972 Seabed Treaty Boundary, the continental shelf boundary shall be adjusted so that it proceeds in a geodesic line from point TA-11 in the 2018 Treaty (at 9° 42' 21.49" South and 128° 28' 35.97" East), to point A18. But this shall not come into force before the commercial depletion of the Greater Sunrise Fields.
