= Bonaparte Basin =

Sedimentary basin in Western Australia and the Northern Territory

Coordinates: 14.3°S 129.5°E

Bonaparte Basin (Northern Territory)

The Bonaparte Basin is a sedimentary basin in Western Australia and the Northern Territory of Australia. Its total area is approximately 270,000 square kilometres (100,000 sq mi), most of which is offshore.

The sedimentary basin emerges at the Joseph Bonaparte Gulf and extends into the ocean in the waters of the gulf and the Timor Sea. It partially overlays the Pine Creek Orogen and the Fitzmaurice Basin. It is bounded on the north by the Timor Trough, on the west by the Browse Basin and on the northeast by the Money Shoals Basin.

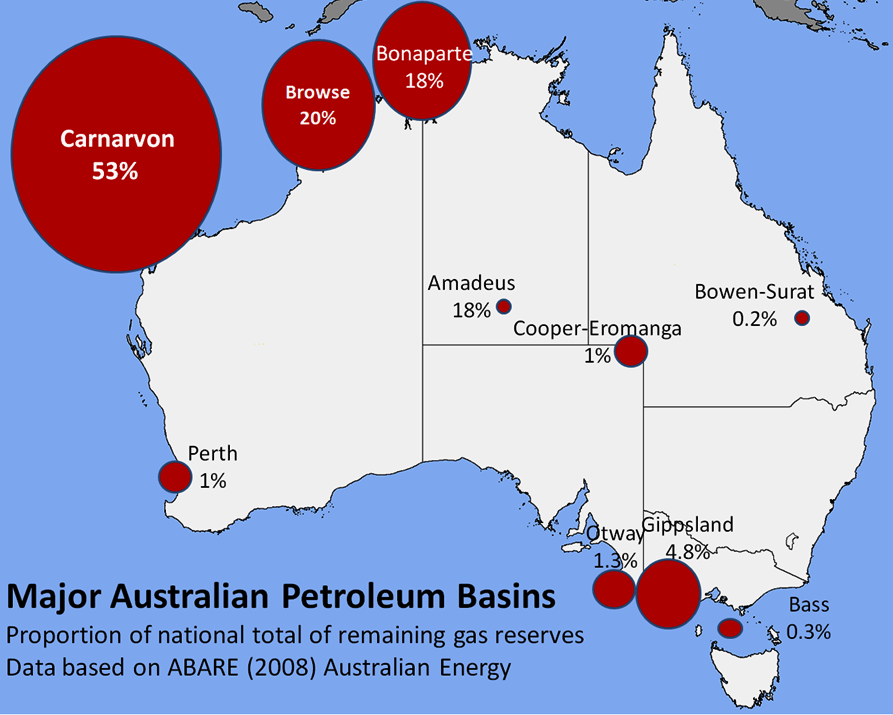
Proportion of national total of natural gas reserves, 2008. Bonaparte Basin is the centre-top circle.

In the sedimentary basin the rock strata is about 5 kilometres (3.1 mi) thick on land, and over 15 kilometres (9.3 mi) thick under the ocean. The basin originated from the Cambrian period to the Cenozoic era, 540 to 360 million years ago. Limestone, sandstone, mudstone, basalt, coal and glacial sediments are embedded in the basin. It contains several oil and natural gas fields amounting to 18% of Australia's known reserves of natural gas. Total estimated reserves are 29 million barrels (4.6×10^{6} m^{3}) of oil and 860 petajoules (2.4×10^{11} kWh) of gas.

The sedimentary basin partially overlays the Kalkaindji province, the Birrindudu Basin and Wolfe Basin.

The Bonaparte Basin has deposits of lead, zinc, iron, gold and smaller coal deposits on land, mineralised in sandstone deposits. There were studies on petroleum and natural gas, which have resulted in oil and gas-producing wells and two undersea pipelines to the Northern Territory.
