= Northern Endeavour =

Defunct FPSO in the Timor Sea

Coordinates: 10°36′52.56″S 125°59′8.18″E

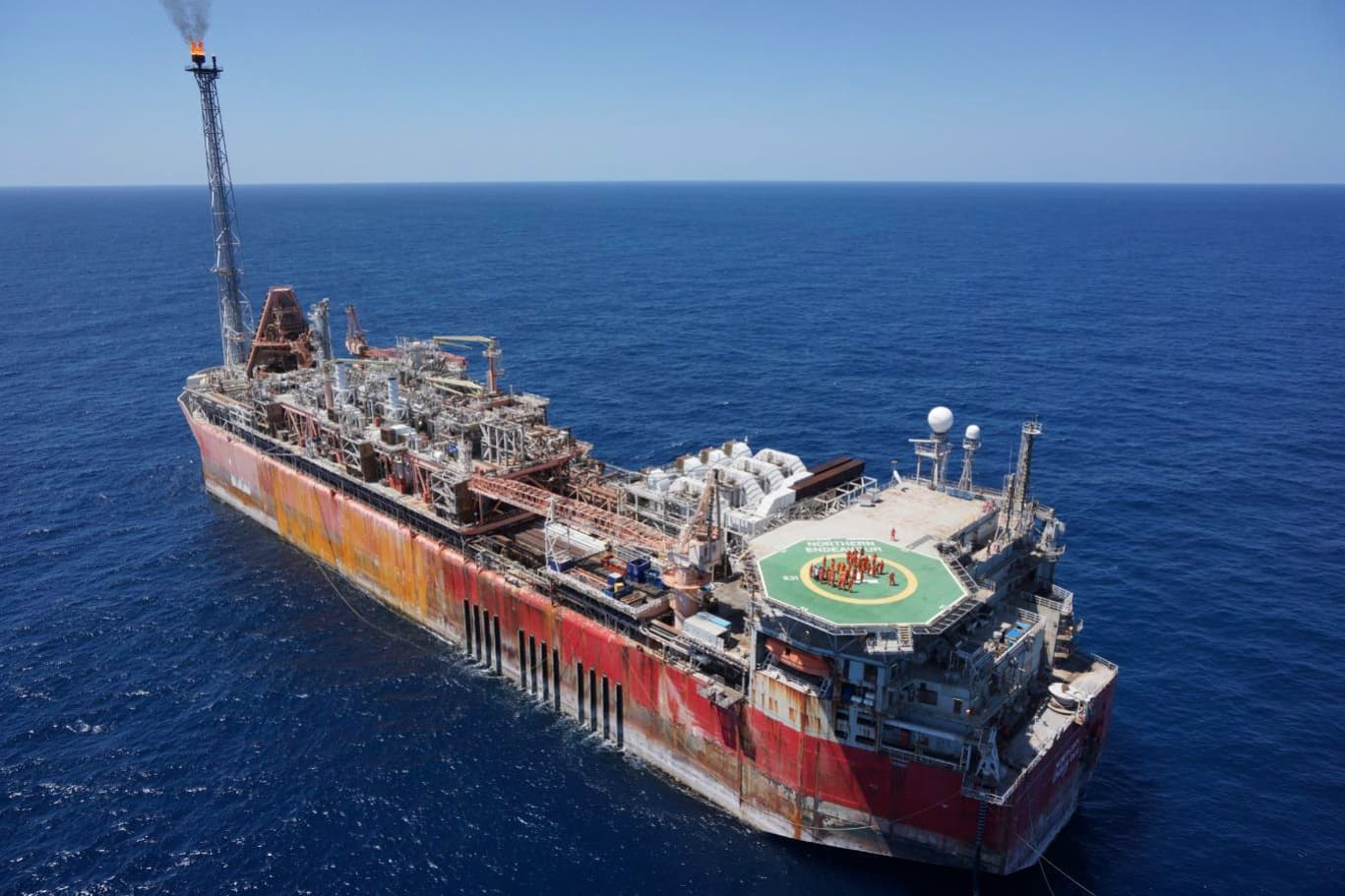

History
- Name: Northern Endeavour
- Owner: Joint Venture (1998-2016); NOGA (2016-2020); Federal Government (2020-present)
- Operator: Woodside (1998-2016); UPS (2016-2022); Petrofac (2022-present)
- Port of registry: Fremantle
- Ordered: 1996
- Completed: 1998
- Identification: IMO number: 9182916
- Status: Decommissioned, removed 20250924, enroute MARS DK for scrapping.

General characteristics
- Type: FPSO
- Length: 273.68 m (897 ft 11 in)
- Beam: 50 m (164 ft 1 in)
- Draught: 28 m (91 ft 10 in)
- Propulsion: Non-propelled
- Capacity: Oil production: 180,000 barrels per day (29,000 m^{3}/d); Oil storage: 1.4 million barrels (220×10^{3} m^{3})

Northern Endeavour is a defunct FPSO formerly moored in the Timor Sea, 550 kilometres (340 mi) northwest of Darwin. It produced oil from the Laminaria and Corallina fields from 1999 to 2019. The vessel underwent preparatory work in Singapore , but is now being scrapped at MARS, Frederikshavn, Denmark.

== Development ==
Under Northern Territory Exploration Permit AC/P8, a joint venture between Woodside Energy (operator – 50%), BHP (25%) and Shell (25%) discovered the Laminaria field in October 1994 with Corallina discovered 10 kilometres (6.2 mi) northwest of Laminaria in December 1995.

The joint venture worked to develop the fields via an FPSO and subsea infrastructure.

The contract for construction of the hull of the FPSO was awarded to Samsung Heavy Industries of South Korea in September 1996, and the contract was subsequently assigned to the FPSO consortium Kvaerner-SBM in January 1997 for the fit-out.

The design, procurement, construction and installation of the subsea facilities was contracted to a joint venture between Coflexip Stena Offshore and JP Kenny in October 1996.

The joint venture was granted Production Licence AC/L5 in February 1997. As the Laminaria field extends into the neighbouring WA-18-L licence, held by BHP and administered by Western Australia, a unit operating agreement was created to apportion production appropriately. This resulted in interest in the Laminaria field effectively becoming – Woodside (44.925%), BHP (32.6125%) and Shell (22.4625%) – with the stakes in Corallina and the FPSO remaining the same.

The initial development consisted of three production wells on Laminaria and two on Corallina. Excess gas was re-injected through a dedicated gas-injection well (East Corallina-1).

Production commenced on 7 November 1999, with total project costs reported as A$1.37 billion.

In 2002, two additional infill wells were drilled for Laminaria and tied back to the FPSO. In 2009 a sidetrack well (Corallina-2 sidetrack-2) was drilled and tied back to the FPSO.

== Production ==
Year	Total oil production (Note: Sourced from Woodside annual reports.)	
1999	Report not found	
2000	54.3 MMbbl	8.63×10^{6} m^{3}
2001	42.9 MMbbl	6.82×10^{6} m^{3}
2002	31.7 MMbbl	5.04×10^{6} m^{3}
2003	17.4 MMbbl	2.77×10^{6} m^{3}
2004	10.5 MMbbl	1.67×10^{6} m^{3}
2005-2008	Not reported (Note: Cumulative production reported as 191.6 MMbbl at the end of 2009.)	
2009	5.4 MMbbl	860×10^{3} m^{3}
2010	3.6 MMbbl	570×10^{3} m^{3}
2011	2.7 MMbbl	430×10^{3} m^{3}
2012	2.2 MMbbl	350×10^{3} m^{3}
2013	1.6 MMbbl	250×10^{3} m^{3}
2014	1.6 MMbbl	250×10^{3} m^{3}
2015	1.4 MMbbl	220×10^{3} m^{3}
2016-2019	Not reported	

Cumulative facility production was stated to be over 205 million barrels (32.6×10^{6} m^{3}) in 2017.

== Changes in ownership ==
In 2004, BHP announced they would sell their stake in both fields and the FPSO to Paladin Resources. Shortly afterwards in 2005, it was announced that Shell was exiting the venture and selling their stake to Woodside and Paladin. Later that year, Talisman Energy acquired Paladin.

The resulting Corallina/Northern Endeavour ownership split became Woodside (66.67%) and Talisman (33.3%) and Laminaria field ownership became Woodside (59.9%) and Talisman (41.1%) with Woodside remaining operator.

In July 2015, Woodside informed regulators they were planning to decommission the Northern Endeavour in the second half of 2016. In parallel to this, sale of the asset was also being pursued.

On 29 September 2015 Woodside and Talisman executed the Laminaria–Corallina Sale Agreement which included the following (full agreement and commercial terms have not been made public):

- Northern Oil & Gas Australia Pty Ltd (NOGA), a newly formed company with a single director (Angus Karoll), would take control of Talisman (itself now a subsidiary of Repsol) by a 100% share purchase.
- Talisman would acquire Woodside's share of the AC/L5 licence and ownership of the Northern Endeavour and all subsea infrastructure.

NOGA changed name of the purchased company from Talisman Energy to Timor Sea Oil & Gas Australia Pty Ltd (TSOGA) in early 2016.

TSOGA contracted maintenance and operation of the facility to Upstream Production Solutions Pty Ltd (UPS) for a period of three years. UPS become the safety case holder for the facility on 9 April 2016 following NOPSEMA acceptance. Woodside was de-registered as the Northern Endeavour operator on 12 September 2016.

== Regulator and government intervention ==
On 10 July 2019, NOPSEMA issued a Prohibition Notice to UPS and on 18 July 2020 a General Direction to TSOGA requiring immediate cessation of production on the Northern Endeavour. NOPSEMA required that a range of long-standing issues, particularly relating to corrosion and safety systems, to be resolved for production to recommence.

NOGA expended all available funds in an attempt to meet NOPSEMA requirements and re-establish production however on 20 September 2019 the company went into voluntary administration. The FPSO was de-crewed at some point following this, remaining in place with navigational lights on in a "lighthouse mode". In February 2020, KPMG as administrator recommended NOGA be liquidated and creditors voted to that same effect on 7 February 2020. Liquidators immediately disclaimed all offshore assets as there was insufficient funding to continue operations, responsibility for those assets fell to the Federal Government of Australia.

The federal government engaged UPS on 15 February 2020 to continue to maintain the FPSO while the decommissioning was being planned.

A secured creditor of NOGA owed more than A$135 million, Castleton Commodities Merchant Asia (CCMA), began legal action against the government on 25 November 2020 in an effort to take control of the FPSO with the intent of selling it. The parties reached a confidential settlement agreement in August 2022 that included the FPSO being delivered to CCMA. CCMA notified the government in 2023 that it would no longer be taking ownership of the FPSO following disconnection. The government had the vessel and all other offshore infrastructure vested absolutely to itself, preventing any further claims.

In 2021, the government worked to enact the Offshore Petroleum (Laminaria and Corallina Decommissioning Cost Recovery Levy) Act 2022 (Cth) which is designed to cover all costs of the decommissioning borne by the government. The levy applies to all offshore production title holders and is calculated on a per barrel of oil equivalent produced basis. During consideration of the bill, Chevron made a submission stating that they strongly opposed the levy and that "As the largest offshore petroleum producer in Australia, Chevron would pay the greatest share of the levy, despite receiving no economic benefit from or involvement in the LamCor oil fields".

In 2022 the government contracted Petrofac to assume operatorship of the FPSO in addition to performing Phase 1 of decommissioning works. In 2025 well suspension was completed by Petrofac for 7 wells (2 already suspended) and the government awarded a contract to COSCO Shipping to dry tow the Northern Endeavour to a recycling location. Later in 2025 it was announced that the contract for recycling of the vessel has been awarded to Modern American Recycling Services Europe with the work to be completed in Frederikshavn, Denmark.

As of April 2025, decommissioning costs incurred by the government total over A$850 million.

=== Regulatory impact ===
On 23 March 2020, the Minister for Resources (Keith Pitt) appointed an independent consultant (Steve Walker) to conduct what would be known as the Review of the circumstances that led to the administration of the Northern Oil and Gas Australia (NOGA) group of companies (the Walker Review). The review was returned to the minister in June with a summary released to the public in August. A redacted version of the full review was made public in September via an FOI request.

In 2021, the government moved to implement recommendations from the Walker Review as part of a suite of legislative and regulatory changes to the offshore oil and gas decommissioning framework. This included new trailing liability provisions that allow the government to force prior offshore licence holders to pay for decommissioning if they sell to new owners who are unable to cover the costs.

Prior to the new legislation, a number of large oil and gas companies operating in Australia had announced plans to sell late life assets, the new rules have led to these plans being abandoned as potential buyers must demonstrate to regulators that they have the ability to decommission any assets they purchase.
