= Timor Sea Treaty =

2002 geopolitical agreement

Formally known as the Timor Sea Treaty between the Government of East Timor and the Government of Australia was signed between Australia and East Timor in Dili, Timor-Leste on 20 May 2002, the day Timor-Leste attained its independence from United Nations rule, for joint petroleum exploration of the Timor Sea by the two countries. The signatories of the treaty were then Australian prime minister John Howard and his East Timorese counterpart at that time Mari Alkatiri.

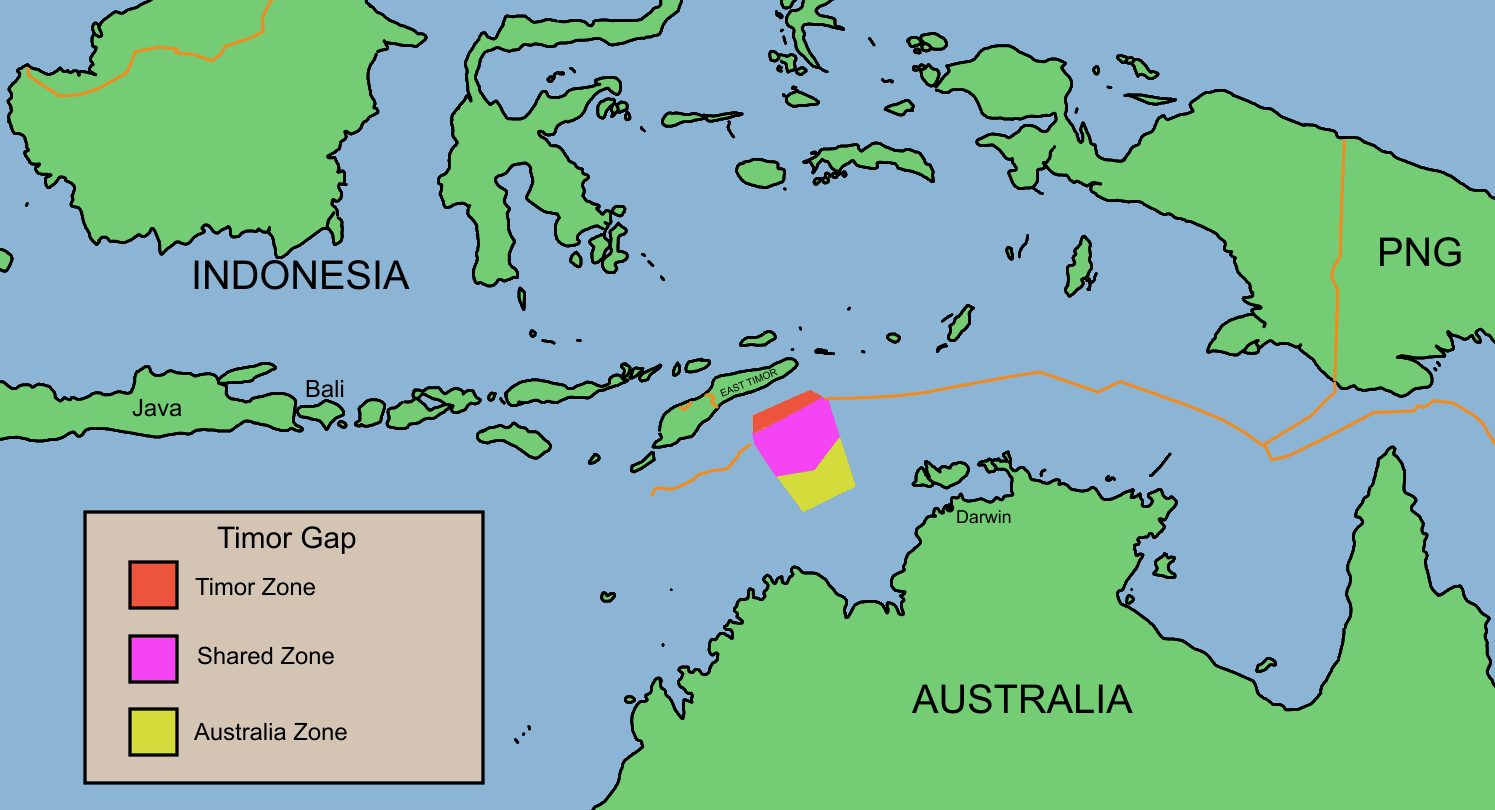
The Timor Gap

The treaty entered into force on 2 April 2003, following an exchange of diplomatic notes and was backdated to 20 May 2002. The treaty was to run for 30 years from the day it came into force or when a seabed boundary could be established, whichever came earlier. However, the subsequent signing of the Treaty on Certain Maritime Arrangements in the Timor Sea (CMATS) in 2007, the period of validity for the Timor Sea Treaty was extended to 2057, when the validity of CMATS also ends.

The Timor Sea Treaty provides for the sharing of the proceeds of petroleum found in an agreed area of seabed, called the Joint Petroleum Development Area and does not determine the sovereignty and maritime boundary between the two countries. The treaty expressly states that the right of either country to claim the overlapping portion of the seabed is maintained.

The Timor Sea Treaty ceased being in force when the Treaty between Australia and the Democratic Republic of Timor-Leste Establishing Their Maritime Boundaries in the Timor Sea entered into force on 30 August 2019.

== Effects of the treaty ==
The treaty replaces the Timor Gap Treaty which was signed between Australia and Indonesia on 11 December 1989, which was no longer valid once the territory of Timor-Leste ceased to be a province of Indonesia. It virtually puts Timor-Leste in the place of Indonesia in the Timor Gap Treaty but with a few differences.

The significant difference between the Timor Gap Treaty and Timor Sea Treaty is that the latter only creates one Joint Petroleum Development Area, with Timor-Leste getting 90% and Australia 10% of the revenue derived from the area. The former created three zones, with the revenue of the middle Zone of Cooperation being divided equally between the two countries.

== See also ==
- Australia–East Timor border
- Sunrise International Unitization Agreement (Sunrise IUA)
- Timor Gap
- Timor Gap Treaty
- Treaty on Certain Maritime Arrangements in the Timor Sea (CMATS)
- Timor Sea topics
