= Timor Trough =

Oceanic trough between the Indo-Australian plate and the Timor plate

Coordinates: 9.0000°S 127.0000°E

The Timor Trough is an oceanic trough that is a continuation of the Sunda Trench (Java Trench) that marks the boundary between the Indo-Australian plate and the Timor plate. It is separated from the Sunda Trench by a sag near Sumba Island at the Scott Plateau and the North Australian Basin, and on the other end becomes the Tanimbar Trough southeast of the Tanimbar Islands, continuing on to the Aru Trough east of the Kai Islands near the Bird's Head Peninsula on New Guinea. Lining the north of the trough are numerous islands, of which Timor is the largest. Further west are the Weber Basin and the Banda Trench. Oil and natural gas have been found in the Bonaparte Basin south of the trough and the region is geologically active with numerous earthquakes.
