= Australia–China relations =

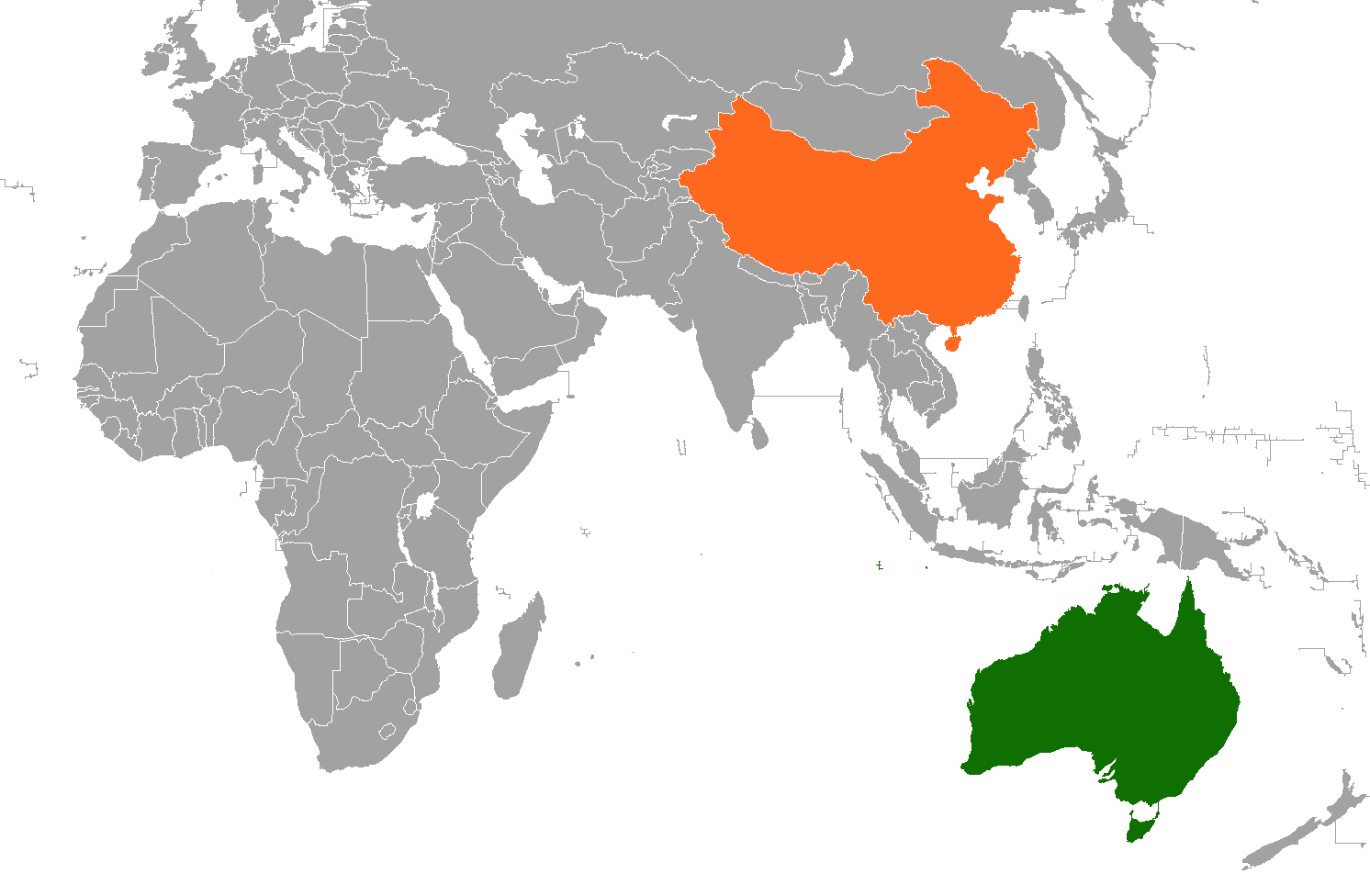

- Australia: China

Diplomatic mission
- Australian Embassy, Beijing: Chinese Embassy, Canberra

Envoy
- Ambassador Graham Fletcher: Ambassador Liu Jinsong

Consular relations between the Qing dynasty and Australia were first established in 1909, and diplomatic relations with the Republic of China (ROC) were established in 1941. Australia continued to recognise the ROC government after it lost the Chinese Civil War and retreated to Taiwan in 1949, but switched recognition to the People's Republic of China (PRC) on 21 December 1972. Chinese Australians have been a significant minority group in the country since the Qing dynasty.

The relationship between China and Australia has grown considerably over the years. They have strong political, economic, and cultural ties, including through multilateral organizations such as APEC, East Asia Summit and the G20. In 2023, Australia expressed its tentative support for China's application for membership of the CPTPP. China is Australia's largest two-way trading partner, and the China-Australia Free Trade Agreement has been in effect since 2015. Numerous Australian companies operate in China and Chinese firms have invested in Australian mining companies. Australia is one of the most popular destinations for overseas higher education and tourism among Chinese people. Australia's Chinese community is also one of the largest in the world, and per capita it is the largest outside Asia, and Mandarin Chinese is the second-most spoken language in Australia.

== History ==
=== Qing dynasty China ===
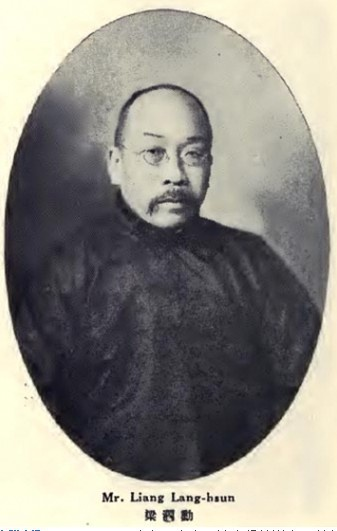
Liang Lan-hsun, first Chinese Consul-General to Australia

The number of Chinese people in Australia rose significantly in the Victorian gold rush era, and by 1861, was around 40,000, constituting 3.3% of the total population.

Liang Lan-hsun was the first Chinese Consul-General to Australia, sent by the government of Qing Empire in 1909 to Melbourne, then the seat of the Australian government. While the Chinese community had agitated for a Qing consulate in Australia for many years, there was reluctance from the British Foreign Office to approve such a move. After federation, the Chinese community's desire for an official voice in Australia increased due to the push for the White Australia Policy and anti-Chinese sentiment following the enactment of the Immigration Restriction Act 1901.

Mei Quong Tart, had for years been favored as the first Chinese Consul-General by the Chinese community, the European consular corps, as well as the Australian Prime Minister, but he died in 1903 before the Consulate-General had been set up. Instead, the first Consul-General was Liang Lan-hsun, an imperial official and experienced diplomat. However, the consul's attention was focused on trade relations, not discrimination against Chinese migrants.

However the last Qing Consul Tong Ying Tung did become involved in assisting Chinese in Australia. Consul-General Tong Ying Tung in an interesting letter to the Minister of the Department of External Affairs declared that the “officers of your Department are operating most harshly against Chinese residents in the Northern Territory”. Consul Tong referred to a number of instances of discrimination and hardship, and pointed out that no distinction was being made between those who were “Foreign Subjects”, “Naturalised British Subjects” or “Australian born British Subjects” whether descended of foreign or naturalised parents. Finally the Qing representative in Australia felt that it was “almost a work of supererogation” when he needed to point out that naturalised British subjects gave up their previous nationality in expectation of having “all the rights and privileges of British Subjects.” Regarding those that were subjects of the Emperor, the Consul-General argued that, with Chinese numbers down and the Commonwealth in full control of its immigration, to treat these small numbers of “innocent persons” so harshly would seem “unnecessary and deplorable”. Not to mention the damage to the fishing industry he had already pointed out. [NAA: A1, 1911/8882, Consul-General for China, Tong Ying Tung to Minister for External Affairs, 22 March 1911.]

=== Republic of China ===
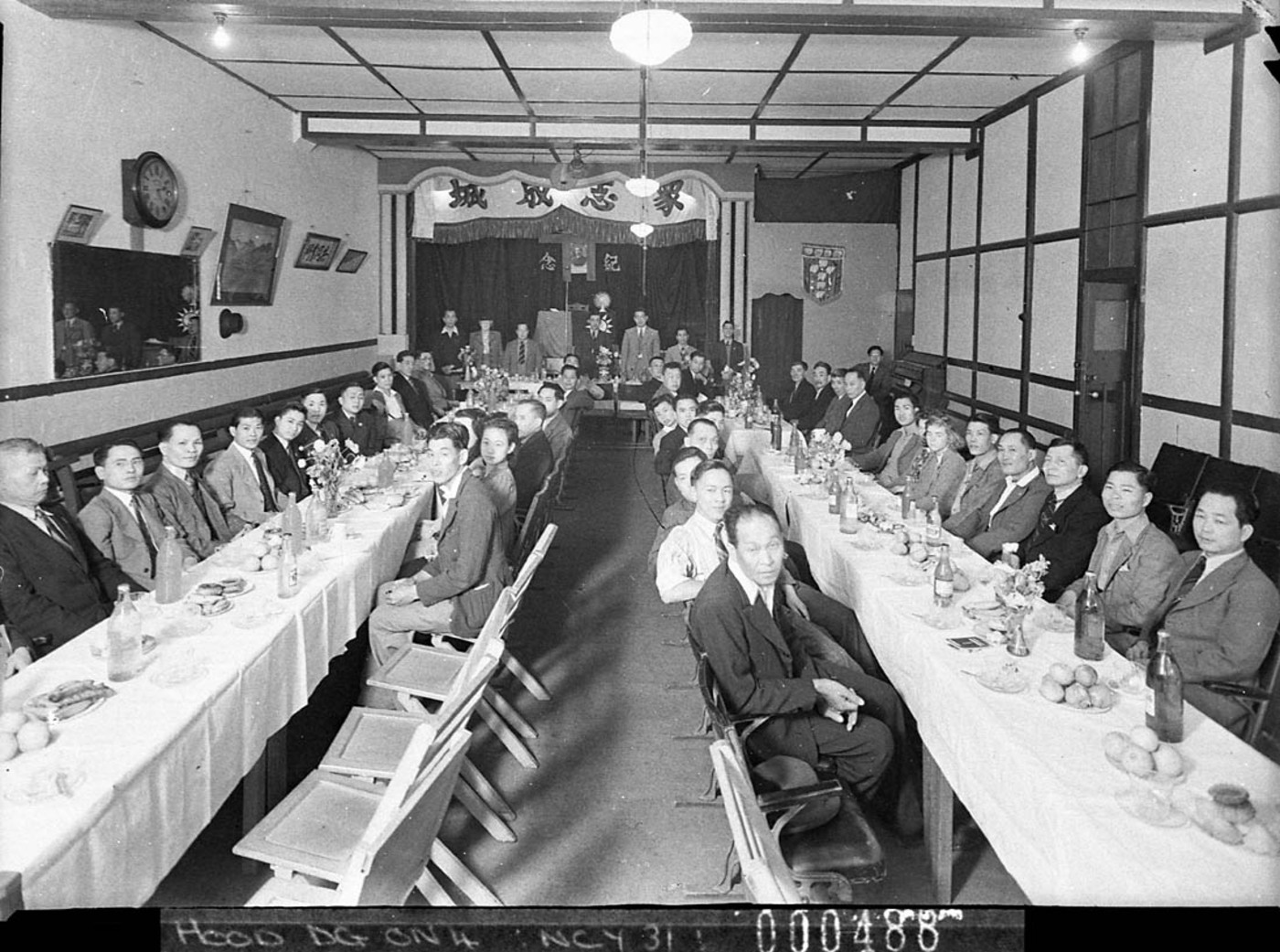
A Kuomintang political luncheon in Australia in 1942.

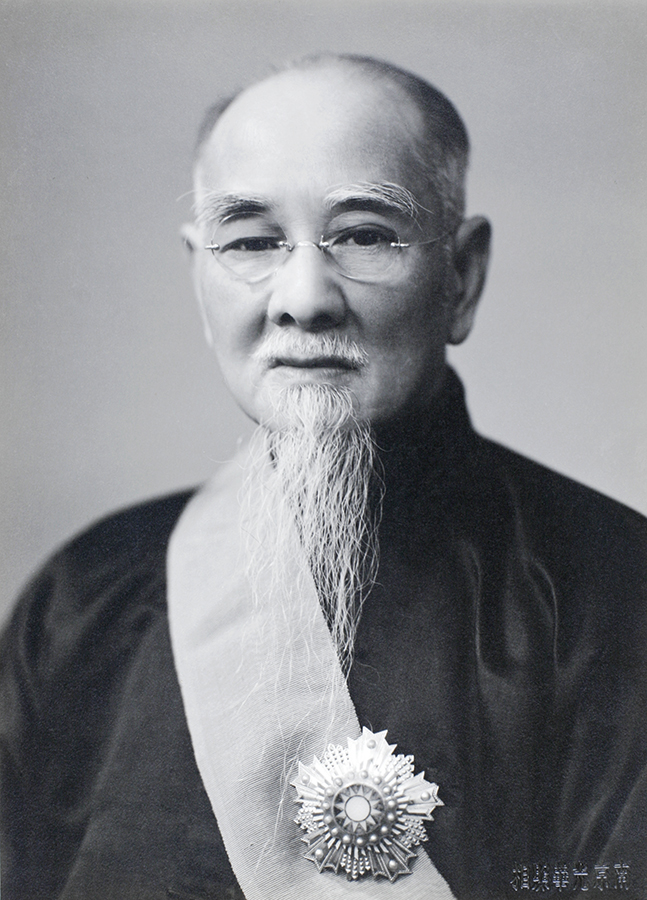
Lin Sen was the first Chinese head of state (in office 1931–1943) to visit Australia (in 1931–2).

On 1 January 1912, the Republic of China replaced the Qing empire. The Consulate-General immediately set about mobilizing the Chinese community in support of the new government, collecting funds and sending delegates to elect overseas Chinese deputies in the new Chinese parliament. Different political factions in China found support in Australia: while the Consulate-General sponsored groups supporting Yuan Shikai's Beijing government, the opposing Chinese Nationalist League (later a branch of the Kuomintang) was formed in Sydney in 1916. A relaxation in Australia's racial exclusion laws led to broader people-to-people interactions. By 1924, 200 Chinese students were arriving in Australia to study in that year alone. An Australian trade commissioner was briefly stationed in China in 1921–22.

In the mid-1920s, conflict between China and Britain surrounding the Canton–Hong Kong strike created tensions between China and Australia (as a dominion of Britain) as well. Following the Northern Expedition in China, greater political unity within China bolstered the Chinese Consulate-General's confidence in criticizing Australian laws that discriminated against the Chinese; they were supported domestically by a resolution at the ruling Kuomintang's Third National Conference in 1929. Australian rules against Chinese residents and visitors were relaxed in response, including making it easier for Chinese nationals to visit or study in Australia.

The 1930s saw an upsurge in bilateral relations. The Consulate-General was reorganised and moved to Sydney, with sub-consulates opened in other key cities. Various Chinese officials visited Australia. In 1931–2, Lin Sen, Chairman of the National Government of China and figurehead head of state, visited Sydney and Melbourne. This was the first visit to Australia by a Chinese head of state, and Lin used the opportunity to press for greater relaxation of Australia's restrictions on Chinese migration. As a mark of respect, he was given a seat on the floor of the House of Representatives. In 1934, John Latham, the deputy leader of the government, led the Australian Eastern Mission which visited China. In 1935, Vivian Gordon Bowden was appointed as Australia's trade commissioner based in Shanghai. The establishment of trade commissions in several Asian countries was an initiative of the Lyons government first announced in 1933, where previously Australian interests had been represented by the United Kingdom.

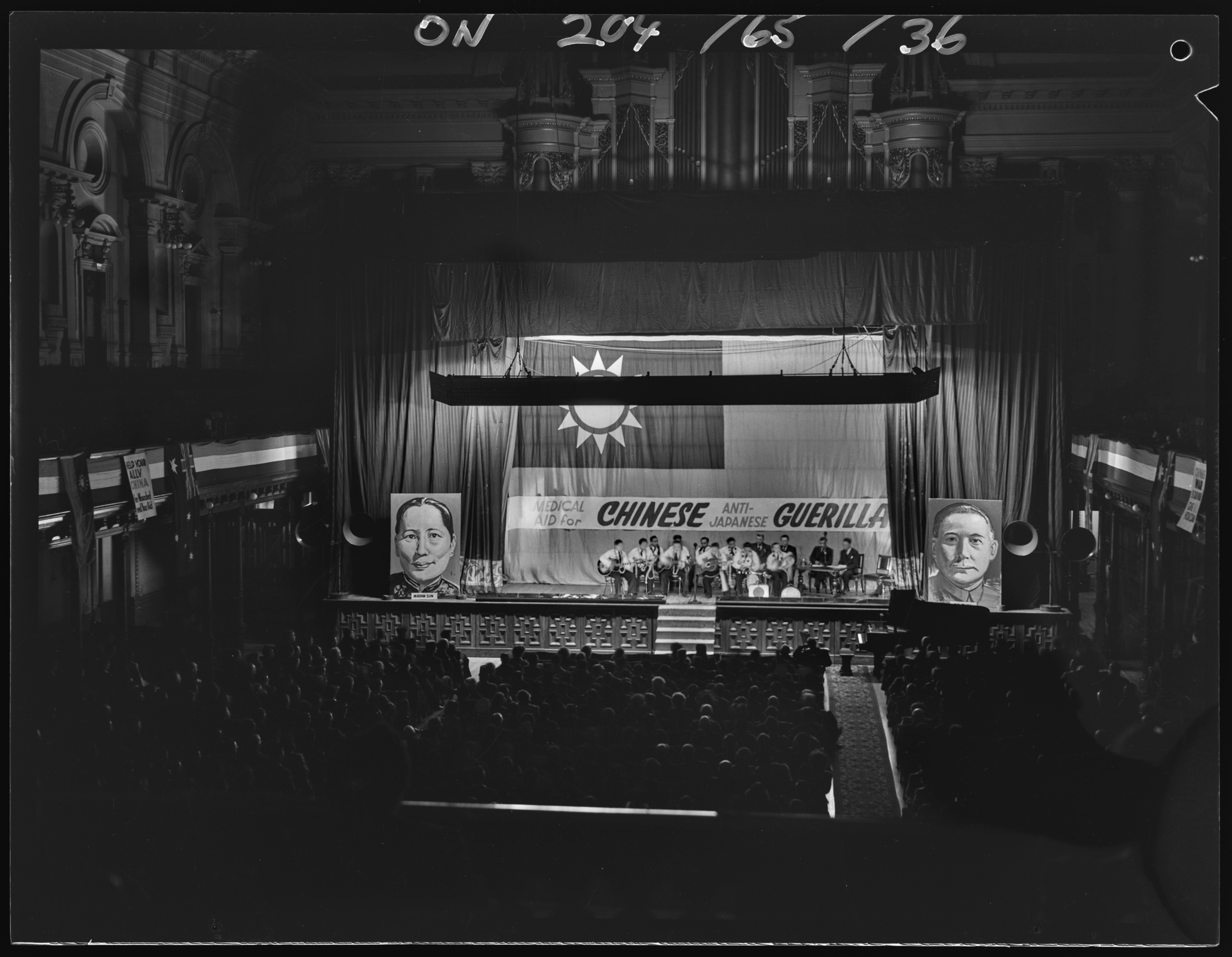
'Medical aid for Chinese anti-Japanese guerillas' concert, Sydney Town Hall, 14 Wyvern Avenue, Chatswood, 4 July 1945

In 1941, after Australia established greater independence in foreign affairs, Australia established diplomatic relations with the Republic of China. Frederic Eggleston, who previously headed the Commonwealth Grants Commission, was appointed the first minister to China in Chongqing, China's war-time capital, while Hsu Mo, deputy foreign minister, was appointed the first minister to Australia. In 1948, the two countries upgraded their mutual representations to ambassadors.

=== People's Republic of China ===
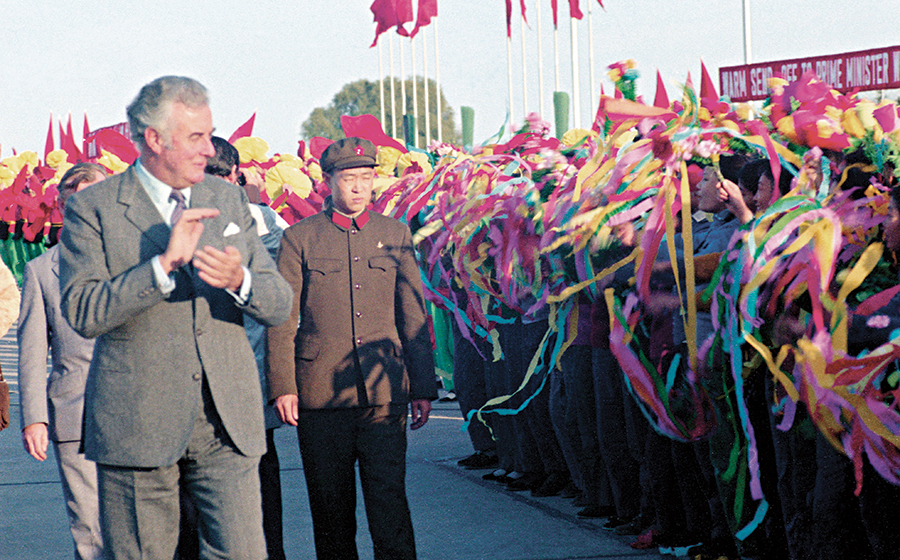
In 1973, Gough Whitlam became the first Australian prime minister to visit China while in office.

After the establishment of the People's Republic of China ("PRC") in 1949 and the retreat of the Republic of China ("ROC") government to Taiwan, Australia did not recognise the PRC. The United Kingdom proposed in 1949 that Britain, Australia and New Zealand should simultaneously recognise the new government. However, the Australian and New Zealand governments were concerned about electoral repercussions at a time when Communism was becoming a more topical issue, and did not do so immediately. Although Ben Chifley's Labor government preferred to be realistic about the new Chinese government and would have supported its admission to the United Nations, it lost the election. The British government went ahead with the recognition of the PRC alone in 1950, but the United States withheld recognition.

The Korean War further solidified the United States' position of supporting the Republic of China regime in Taiwan instead of the PRC. Wavering between its two traditional allies, Australia chose to follow the lead of the United States, rather than Britain, Sweden, Denmark, Finland, Norway, France, Canada, and Italy (all of which switched recognition to the PRC before 1970).

However, from 1950, Australia refused to accept ambassadors from the ROC (the mission was allowed to remain but, until 1959, was headed by a chargé d'affaires). Likewise, until 1966 Australia did not send an ambassador to Taiwan. From as early as 1954, the Australian government's Department of External Affairs was recommending the recognition of the PRC, but this advice was not politically accepted. During the Cold War, Australia's strategic alignment swung further towards the United States. While the Labor Party's official policy from 1955 was that Australia should follow the examples of Britain and France in recognizing the PRC, on the basis that the ROC was unlikely to recover the mainland, the Liberal Party-led Coalition played up the perceived threat of a Communist China for electoral advantage, including the support of the anti-Communist Democratic Labor Party. As part of this political strategy, Australian Prime Minister Harold Holt explicitly recognised the continuing legitimacy of the ROC government in Taiwan in 1966, by sending an ambassador to Taipei for the first time.

The government of William McMahon sought to improve non-official relations with China, in areas such as trade and culture, but China was not receptive to such exchanges without diplomatic recognition.

As opposition leader, Gough Whitlam visited China in 1971 (before Henry Kissinger's historic visit on behalf of the United States), and in December 1972, after Whitlam's victory in that year's federal election, Australia established diplomatic relations with the People's Republic of China, and Australia ceased to recognise the Republic of China government of Chiang Kai-shek in Taiwan. Although Whitlam's decision was informed by warming relations between China and the West generally, especially the United States, Australian diplomatic relations with the People's Republic predated that of the United States by seven years. The establishment of relations with "Red China" roused great excitement in Australia. Stephen Fitzgerald became the first Australian ambassador to the People's Republic of China, and Wang Guoquan was the first PRC ambassador to Australia.

Since the Chinese economic reforms initiated by the late Deng Xiaoping, China has benefited from significant investment in China by Australian companies (for example, future prime minister Malcolm Turnbull had set up the first China-foreign joint venture mining company in China in 1994), while Australia has benefited from the Chinese appetite for natural resources to modernise its economy, infrastructure and meet its growing energy demands. In 2009, it was estimated the trade and investment with China brought benefits of close to $4000 per Australian household; in 2011, this was estimated to be A$10,500 per household per year.

China and Australia were the final two bidders for the 2000 Summer Olympics. Australia subsequently won and Sydney hosted the 2000 Summer Olympics. Eight years later, China hosted the Beijing Summer Olympics in 2008.

Australia is one of the few countries in the world that was not in recession during the 2008 financial crisis. Its continued economic growth due to that period is partly attributed to large demand and long term strong fundamentals from China.

As China's influence raises, the Chinese government has been trying to control and monitor the ethnic Chinese living and studying in Australia, and to influence Australian politicians via political donors, which causes serious concern to Australia's security agency, Australian Security Intelligence Organization.

Relations between the two countries began to deteriorate in 2018 due to growing concerns of Chinese political influence in various sectors of Australian society including the Government, universities and media as well as China's stance on the South China Sea dispute. The COVID-19 pandemic exacerbated issues and tensions between the countries, especially after Australia called for an international, independent inquiry into the origins of the disease. The subsequent changes that China made to its trade policies have been interpreted as political retaliation and economic coercion against Australia.

In September 2021, Australia announced a new trilateral military security partnership with the US and UK for the Indo-Pacific region named AUKUS under which Australia would acquire conventionally-armed nuclear-powered submarines. Although China was not specifically mentioned in the news announcements, critics interpreted it as a major blow to the Australian-Chinese relationship, by firmly allying Australia with the US in military terms in the region. China was critical of the formation of AUKUS.

==== Hong Kong ====
Australia's ties to China include its relations with Hong Kong which date back to when both were under British rule. Although Hong Kong, as a special administrative area of China, cannot conduct its own foreign affairs, consular and economic representations exist. Australia maintains a consulate in Hong Kong, while Hong Kong maintains the Hong Kong Economic and Trade Office in Australia.

== Cultural relations ==
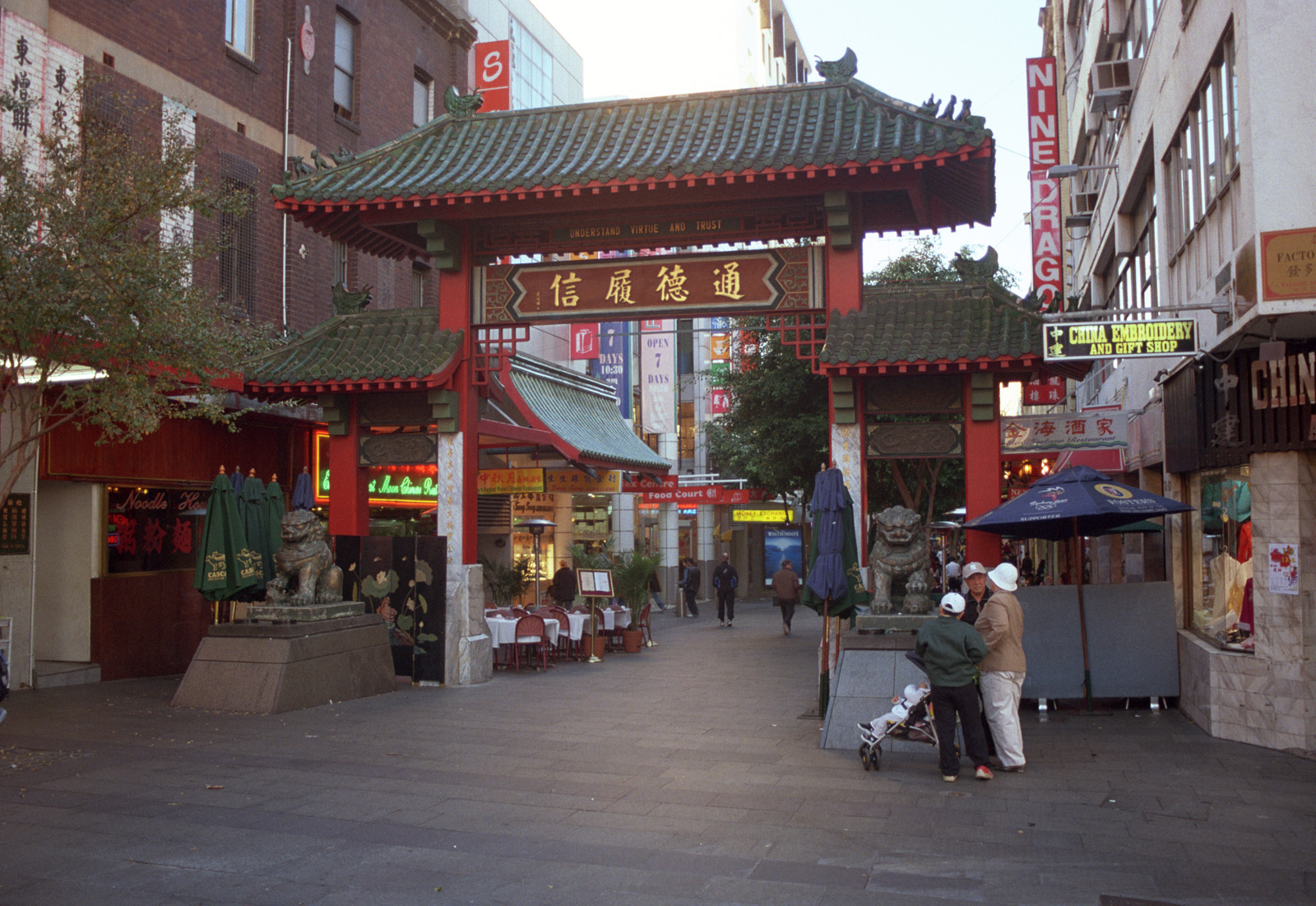
Chinatown, Sydney

Australia has been a haven for Chinese migrants for centuries who have, in the modern day, established themselves as a significant minority group in Australian society. There are now large numbers of Australian-born Chinese and Chinese-born migrants/Australian Citizens in the cities of Melbourne, Sydney and Brisbane with small Chinese communities in regional centers, particularly in Victoria, and New South Wales. There are also Chinatowns in every Australian capital city, including Darwin and large, public Chinese New Year Celebrations in Melbourne and Sydney. China has established many Confucius Institutes with Australia universities in major capital cities in Australia to foster better cultural ties. The Australian Confucius Institutes have become subject to controversy.

Australians in China also had influence in the establishments of Australian rules football teams.

== Education relations ==
Australians have gone to China to study since the 19th century. William Mayers studied in China from 1859, and was involved in negotiations to bring the first railway and steam engine to China. In 2011, China was overall the most popular destination for Australian students studying overseas. It was the most popular destination for Australian students undertaking short-term studies overseas, the seventh most popular destination for long-term studies, and also the seventh most popular destination for practical placements. In 2014, there were 4,700 Australians studying in Chinese universities, and in 2015 the Australian government's New Colombo Plan was expected to send 525 tertiary students to study in China.

There is also a long tradition of Chinese students going to Australia to study. The numbers were small initially: a total of only 30 students entered Australia to study between 1912 and 1920. In 1924, about 300 Chinese students entered Australia to study. They were mostly children of residents.

Australia began accepting Chinese students for tertiary education in 1986 in English Language Intensive Courses for Overseas Students (ELICOS). Several thousands Chinese were studying in Australia in 1987. In the aftermath of Tiananmen Square protests of 1989, the Australian government granted protection for about 20,000 Chinese students in Australia. Since then, Australia has become one of the biggest markets for Chinese students for tertiary education. In early 2011, there were over 126,000 Chinese students in Australia and they made up 26 per cent of the total foreign students. As of September 2011, there were 150,000 Chinese students studying at Australia tertiary institutions. The Australian education export market was worth 2009/10 A$19 billion. The well-developed nature of Australia-China education relations has spawned a thriving sphere of bilateral youth engagement, with non-government organizations such as the Australia China Youth Association, Australia-China Youth Dialogue, Australia-China Young Professionals Initiative, and Engaging China Project receiving high-level government and university support to connect thousands of young Australians and Chinese to academic, cultural, and professional exchanges.

The Australia China Alumni Association facilitates continued cooperation for graduates of Australian universities who become active in business in China.

== Economic relations ==
Monthly value of Australian merchandise exports to China (A$ millions) since 1988

Monthly value of Chinese merchandise exports to Australia (A$ millions) since 1988

=== Before 1912 ===
Although Chinese traders were reportedly present in Australia from the 1750s, bilateral trade was small scale until the 20th century. Australia's trade relations were heavily geared towards the British Empire, and at Federation in 1901, trade with China accounted for 0.3% of Australian merchandise trade flow. At that time, Australia mainly imported tea and rice from China, as well as certain luxuries such as silk. Chinese imports from Australia were focused on minerals (silver, gold, copper and pig lead), but also included grains.

=== 1912 to 1972 ===
During the early 20th century, agricultural produce began to make up a larger share of Australian exports to China, including a growing demand for Australian butter and wheat. By 1917–18, Australia was exporting 431,287 kilograms (950,825 lb) of butter to China. Meanwhile, Australian demand for silk and other textiles increased during the early 20th century.

World War II disrupted trade between Australia and China. In the post-war decades, wool became an important Australian commodity imported by China. From the 1960s, however, agricultural shortages in China led to heavy imports of Australian wheat. By the early 1970s, China still accounted for only 1% of Australia's merchandise trade flow.

=== 1972 to 2020 ===
In July 1972, a Chinese table tennis team visited New Zealand and Australia as part of the Chinese "Ping Pong" diplomacy push. They did not get an official reception; the team came via New Zealand where they were given an official afternoon tea and met the Prime Minister Jack Marshall and Foreign Minister Keith Holyoake (the chief Table Tennis official Madame Cheng Chi-Hung was actually the head of the American, Western European and Australasian Department in the Chinese Foreign Ministry).

A few years after the establishment of diplomatic relations between Australia and the People's Republic of China, China began market-orientated reforms, which led to a significant and increasing expansion of bilateral trade. China is Australia's biggest trading partner mainly due to China's strong demand for iron ore, coal and liquefied natural gas. Exports to China helped Australia escape the worst effects of the 2008 financial crisis.

Many major Australian mining companies rely heavily on China and other growing big economies such as India for exports. These companies include BHP, Fortescue, Rio Tinto and Xstrata who have major Australian operations.

China exports mainly clothing, telecommunications equipment and components, computers, toys, prams and sporting equipment.

The bilateral trade between the two countries is worth A$105 billion in 2010/2011. Australia's exports to China totalled A$64.8 billion, while China's export to Australia was worth A$41.1 billion in 2010–2011 period.

Year	two-way trade
2008	$73.8 billion
2009	$85.1 billion
2010	$105.3 billion
2011	$121.1 billion

There are direct flights from a number of cities in China such as Beijing, Shanghai, Hong Kong SAR and Guangzhou to Brisbane, Melbourne, Adelaide and Sydney. Recently, China Southern Airlines have commenced scheduled commercial flights to Perth from Guangzhou in early November 2011. China Southern has its pilot training facilities in Australia for many years. They are in Jandakot and Merredin which were established in 1993.

There were initial fears of Chinese investment in the resource sector similar to the sentiments on Japanese investments in Australia in the 1980s, but that has somewhat heated up and dissipated depending on the investments which were scrutinised by the Foreign Investment Review Board and politicians. Australia is focused on investments which have a win win situations with participation of local companies participation and jobs growth.

In 2000, the two countries established the Australia-China Bilateral Dialogue for Energy and Resources Cooperation (BDERC). BDERC is the primary high-level mechanism for energy dialogue between Australia and China, with a particular focus on fossil fuels.

Australia has been a vital source of the high technology needed for China to enforce its claims to vast reaches of the western Pacific, including the base technology for the design of the Houbei class missile boat.

On 8 April 2013, Australian Prime Minister Julia Gillard announced the deal that the Australian dollar is set to become only the third currency after the US dollar and the Japanese yen to trade directly with the Chinese yuan during a trip to Shanghai.

To encourage Australian entrepreneurship in Greater China, the Australian Chamber of Commerce of Greater China organises every year the Australia-China Business Awards (ACBA) which recognise companies that have worked to deliver Australian products or services to the Greater China region.

The China–Australia Free Trade Agreement was signed in 2015.

Australia has raised security concerns over Chinese involvement in 5G wireless networks with a risk that cellular network equipment sourced from Chinese vendors may contain backdoors enabling surveillance by the Chinese government (as part of its intelligence activity internationally) and Chinese laws, such as the China Internet Security Law, which compel companies and individuals to assist the state intelligence agency on the collection of information whenever requested.

In February 2018, over fears of rising Chinese influence, the Australian Government announced tougher rules on foreign buyers of agricultural land and electricity infrastructure.

=== Since 2020 ===
As of 2025, Chinese investment in Australia is primarily in the resources sector and predominantly mining-related.

In March 2020 during the COVID-19 pandemic, Australia brought in new rules to scrutinise foreign takeovers of Australian companies, after MPs in the Australian Parliament expressed concerns that companies impacted by the pandemic-induced economic slowdown would become vulnerable to buyouts by state-owned enterprises in authoritarian regimes including China. In April 2020, Australian Border Force intercepted faulty masks and other personal protective equipment kits that had been imported from China to help stop the spread of coronavirus.

Relations deteriorated further in May 2020 after Australia called for an independent investigation into the initial coronavirus outbreak in China, with Prime Minister Scott Morrison suggesting that WHO needed tough "weapons inspector" powers to investigate the cause of the outbreak. On 12 May 2020, China banned import of beef from four Australian beef processing firms, constituting about 35% of Australia's beef exports to China. A spokesman for China's foreign ministry said that the ban was to "secure the health and safety of Chinese consumers" before adding China's criticism against Australia's pursuit of an investigation into the origins of COVID-19, which was first discovered in China. The spokesman, Zhao Lijian, denied that the two issues were connected.

From 19 May 2020, China instituted an 80% tariff on barley imports from Australia. China stated the tariffs were the culmination of multi-year Chinese investigations into dumping and government subsidies. The Australian government and the industry strongly rejected China's findings. The previous week, China had unfrozen barley imports from the United States. Annual estimates (dated around 2017–2018) state China grows less than two million tonnes (4.4 billion pounds) of barley per year and imports about nine million tonnes (20 billion pounds) of barley annually. Australia grows about nine million tonnes (20 billion pounds) per year, three times as much as the entire US.

On 25 May 2020, the Chinese government warned Australia to "distance" itself from the US amid growing tensions. Accusing the US of pushing for a "new Cold War", Beijing said that any support Australia shows for the US would deliver "a fatal blow" to the Australian economy. The Global Times said in a related report, "Australia's economic deterrent force is much smaller than the US', so China to some extent will enjoy more room to fight back against Australia with countermeasures if Canberra supports Washington... it means Australia may feel more pain than the US."

On 19 June 2020, the Australian government announced that there had been a spate of cyber-attacks on Australian businesses and government agencies from a "sophisticated state based actor", without naming China directly. However, sources familiar with the Australian government's thinking said there was a high degree of confidence that China was behind the cyber-attacks. China denied that it was involved and said it "firmly opposed all forms of cyber attacks". The average cost of cybercrime to a business in Australia is around $276,000 Australian dollars.

In June 2020, the Chinese government also issued a travel warning to Australia's Chinese diaspora and Chinese students studying in Australia, citing an increase in racial discrimination and violence against Chinese people. In 2019, more than 1.2 million Chinese tourists visited Australia, spending $12.4 billion Australian dollars in total. Additionally, fees from Chinese students contribute about $12 billion Australian dollars to the economy each year.

In November 2020, China imposed "anti-dumping" tariffs ranging from 107.1% to 212.1% on wine imported from Australia. In December 2020, after months of restrictions, China fully blocked coal imports from Australia.

In 2020, Chinese investment in Australia dropped 61% compared to the year prior amidst strained diplomatic relations. The Australian National University's Chinese Investment in Australia (CHIIA) Database recorded just over $780m (A$1bn; £550m) in investment, the lowest number in 6 years.

On 21 April 2021 the Federal Foreign Minister Marise Payne announced that the State of Victoria's memorandum of understanding with China regarding the Belt and Road Initiative would be cancelled.

In June 2021, the BBC reported Australia will file a formal complaint with the World Trade Organization (WTO) over China imposing tariffs of 218% on its wine.

Despite tense relations between the two countries in 2021, Australian trade with China flourished, largely due to the trade in iron ore and meat. By August 2021, Australia had achieved a record trade surplus with China.

In August 2023, due to an improvement of relations, China's Ministry of Commerce announced that it would be lifting its "anti-dumping and anti-subsidy" tariffs on Australian barley. In March 2024, the Ministry of Commerce further announced it would lift the tariffs imposed on Australian wine. In turn, Australia announced it would discontinue its formal complaint at the WTO.

As of 2025, Australian lawyers and bankers involved in foreign acquisitions report that post-2015 changes to the Foreign Investment Review Board (FIRB) process, driven by national security concerns, have slowed the approval of Chinese investment applications and deterred further interest. A report by KPMG and the University of Sydney found that Chinese investment in Australia totalled $1.3 billion in 2024, the third-lowest level since 2006, behind only 2021 and 2023.

On 15 July 2025, during a roundtable with business leaders in Beijing, Chinese Premier Li Qiang criticised Australian Prime Minister Anthony Albanese over Australia's foreign investment framework, specifically expressing concern about the Foreign Investment Review Board (FIRB) process. Li argued that Chinese companies were facing unfair treatment under Australia's tightened investment screening regime, which imposes greater scrutiny on bids involving key assets and sensitive sectors. He urged Australia to create a non-discriminatory business environment and to properly address issues related to market access and investment review. His remarks followed long-standing Chinese objections to reforms introduced after the 2015 lease of Port Darwin to Chinese company Landbridge, which had bypassed FIRB scrutiny and later drew national security backlash. The Australian government insisted its policies are country-agnostic and grounded in national interest.

== Political relations ==
At the time of the Federation of Australia, the prominent Chinese intellectual Liang Qichao toured Australia, meeting the first Prime Minister of Australia, Edmund Barton. He wrote extensively during this time, including some poetry, and expressing a desire that his large country might also benefit from a form of federation. However, Barton felt the two nations had very little in common, and felt aware that China's population could easily "swamp" that of Australia; as such relations were limited and only ever intermediated through the United Kingdom.

Relations with China became a political priority during World War II, with Australia sending Sir Frederic Eggleston to lead its mission there in 1941.

Whilst economic relations between China and Australia have increased significantly to the benefit of both nations, Australia under the Howard government appeared reluctant to pursue closer political/military ties with China and has maintained a close alliance with the United States, particularly since the presidency of George W. Bush.

China is emerging as a political and economic power in the Asia Pacific region which is traditionally anchored by the United States. Australia is a Middle power country like many Asian countries which have security arrangements with the United States but growing economic ties with China.

=== Whitlam government: 1972–1975 ===
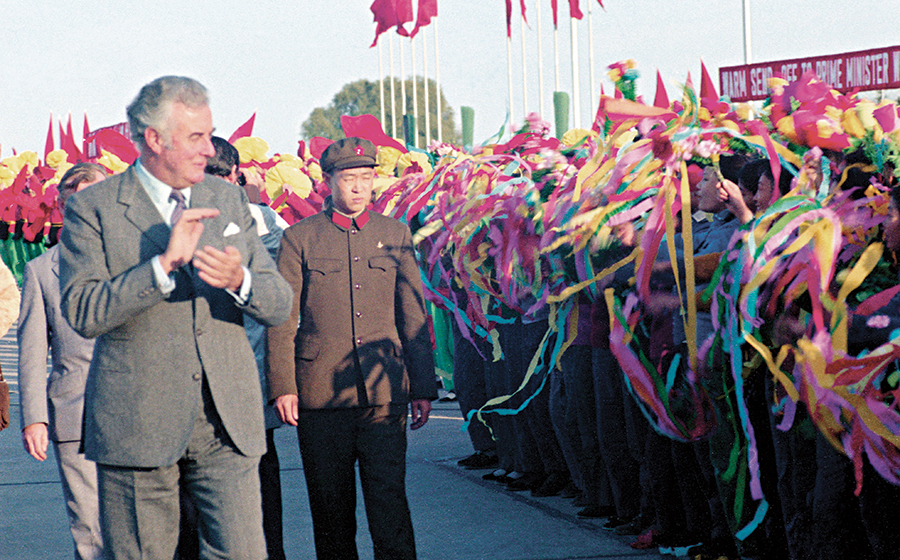
Whitlam's visit to China, in July 1971

Gough Whitlam's visit to China, in the months before becoming prime minister, is said to be a turning point in relations. In the view of the diplomat Stephen FitzGerald, the trip paved the way for diplomatic relations and a resumption of trade, while creating a new level of public support for engagement with Asia.

=== Howard government: 1996–2007 ===
On 15 June 2007, when Prime Minister John Howard received the Dalai Lama, China protested, with official critics. In 2007 Howard stated that Australia's improvement of its foreign relations with China constituted one of his government's "policy successes." Nevertheless, he added, "we've always done it against background of being realistic about the nature of political society in that country. We have no illusions that China remains an authoritarian country."

=== Rudd government: 2007–2010 ===
The election of Kevin Rudd as Prime Minister of Australia was seen as favorable to China-Australian relations, notably since he was the first Australian Prime Minister to speak fluent Mandarin, and that closer engagement with Asia was one of the "Three Pillars" of his foreign policy.

In 2004, Rudd, who at the time was Shadow Minister for Foreign Affairs, delivered a speech in Beijing entitled "Australia and China: A Strong and Stable Partnership for the 21st Century".

In February 2008, Australia reportedly "chastised Taiwan for its renewed push for independence" and "reiterated its support for a one-China policy". In April, however, Rudd addressed Chinese students at Peking University, and, speaking in Mandarin, referred to "significant human rights problems in Tibet". Rudd also raised the issue in talks with Chinese Premier Wen Jiabao, in a context of "simmering diplomatic tension" according to TV3.

Prime Minister Rudd received lukewarm response from China about his Zhengyou terminology used to describe Australia's relationship with China.

In July 2009, following the arrest in China of Australian mining executive Stern Hu, accused of spying, Rudd intervened to "remind our Chinese friends that China [...] has significant economic interests at stake in its relationship with Australia and with its other commercial partners around the world". Later in August 2009, the PRC government protested against the Australian government after Rebiya Kadeer was granted a visa to visit Australia to attend the Melbourne International Film Festival. Along with the Rio Tinto espionage case and the failed bid for Chinalco to purchase a higher stake in Rio Tinto, such events are generally considered as lowest ever points in China-Australian relations for the past few years. China has also effectively banned visits by senior Australian officials, in protest against the events in question.

Despite the souring of relations within 2009, on 19 August 2009, Chinese petroleum company PetroChina signed an A$50 billion deal with ExxonMobil to purchase liquefied natural gas from the Gorgon field in Western Australia, considered the largest contract ever signed between China and Australia, which ensures China a steady supply of LPG fuel for the next 20 years, and also forms China's largest supply of relatively "clean energy".

=== Gillard government: 2010–2013 ===
The Gillard/Rudd government maintained strong economic ties with China through agreements to explore clean energy and to make sure Australia remains a longstanding and reliable supplier of energy and natural resources. Australia under Prime Minister Julia Gillard/Kevin Rudd has stated will continue positive and constructive engagement with China but maintaining security ties with the United States based on shared values.

Following his nomination as Australian prime minister, Kevin Rudd visited China's foreign minister, Yang Jiechi, before visiting Japan, and subsequently organised a meeting between Yang and the Australian foreign minister, Stephen Smith, in which Australia unilaterally announced its departure from the Quadrilateral Security Dialogue amidst Chinese displeasure at Australia's participation. Within Australia, this decision was seen as motivated by the uncertainty of China-United States relations and by the fact that Australia's principle economic partner, China, was not its principle strategic partner. Rudd may furthermore have feared regional escalations in conflict and attempted to diffuse these via an "Asia-Pacific Union."

Rudd's replacement as Australian prime minister by Julia Gillard in June 2010 was associated with a shift in Australian foreign policy towards a closer relationship to the United States alongside a revival of interest in participation in the Quadrilateral and a distancing from China. The Australian, which has written extensively on the Quadrilateral and on Australian defense issues, argued after Rudd's replacement that "Australia's national interest is best served by continuing to engage and encourage our long-standing ally, the US, to retain its primacy in the region." Despite Gillard's rapprochement with the US and increased US-Australian military cooperation, Rudd's decision to leave the Quadrilateral remained an object of criticism from Tony Abbott and the Liberal Party.

Gillard government's action to station US troops in Australia has been strongly criticised and viewed with suspicion by China as it asserted that the defense pact could undermine regional security. An article in the Sydney Morning Herald reported that Gillard declared that, "China has nothing to fear from an American military build-up near Darwin and knows that Australia and the US are long-time allies."

In April 2013, Gillard went to China and met with new Chinese leader, CCP General Secretary Xi Jinping and new Chinese Premier Li Keqiang with Foreign minister Bob Carr and Trade minister Craig Emerson to secure closer ties with China and economic relations.

=== Abbott government: 2013–2015 ===
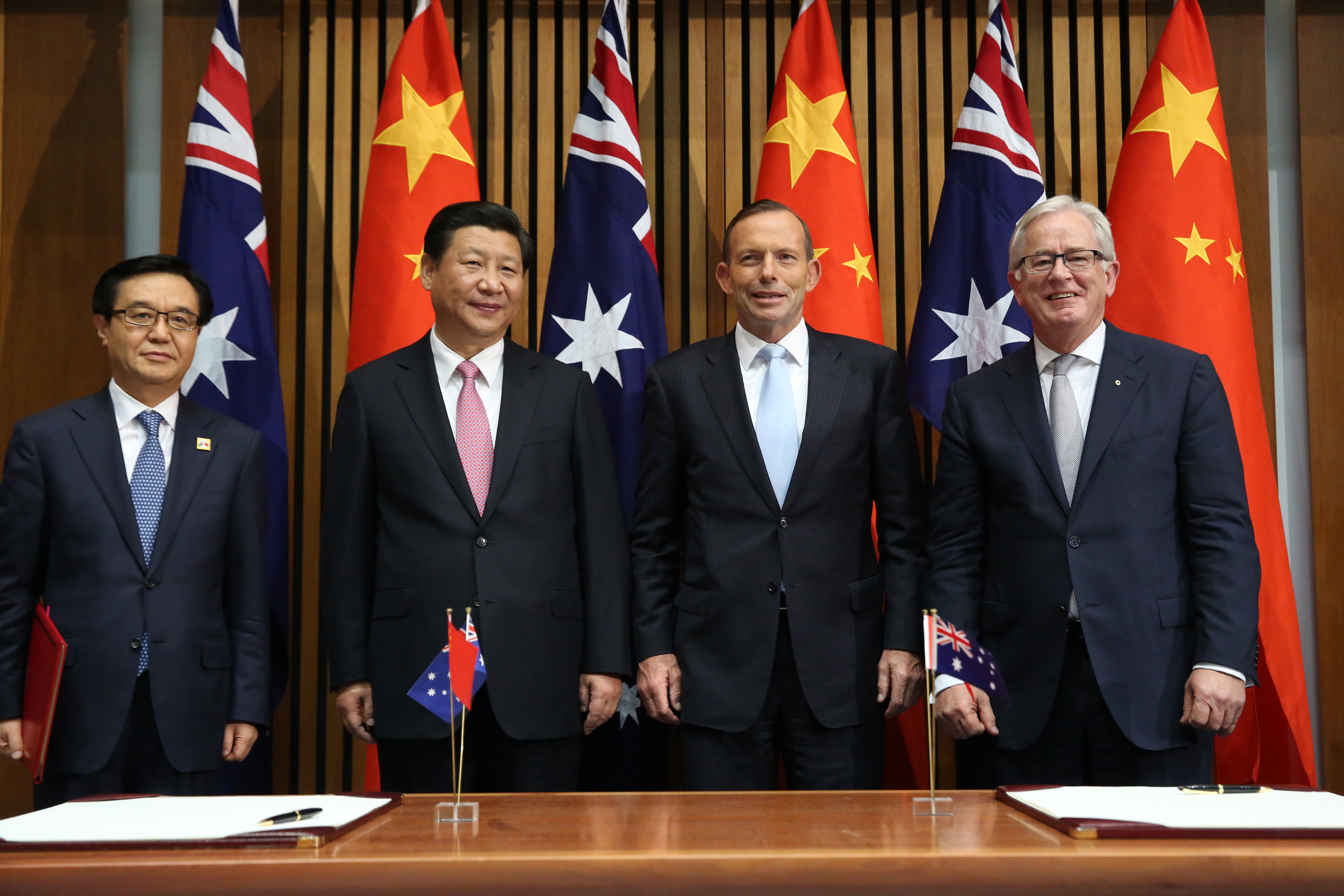
Prime Minister Abbott with Minister Andrew Rob, signing the Australia-China Free Trade Agreement with Chinese leader Xi Jinping and Minister Gao Hucheng, in 2014

Defense Minister Senator David Johnston expressed his belief that Australia does not need to "choose between the US and China." Speaking on behalf of the coalition government, he further stated "we see that there is a balance between our relationship with China and sustaining our strong alliance with the United States."

On 17 November 2014, Australia and China finalised a deal which saw a Free Trade Agreement established between the two nations. At the time, conservative commentators raised concerns that Australia may lose control over key assets, such as dairy farms, but Prime Minister Abbott gave assurances that no one would be forced into any deals.

Chinese leader Xi Jinping addressed a joint-sitting of the Upper and Lower Houses of Australian Parliament in November 2014, lauding Australia's 'innovation and global influence'.

=== Turnbull government: 2015–2018 ===
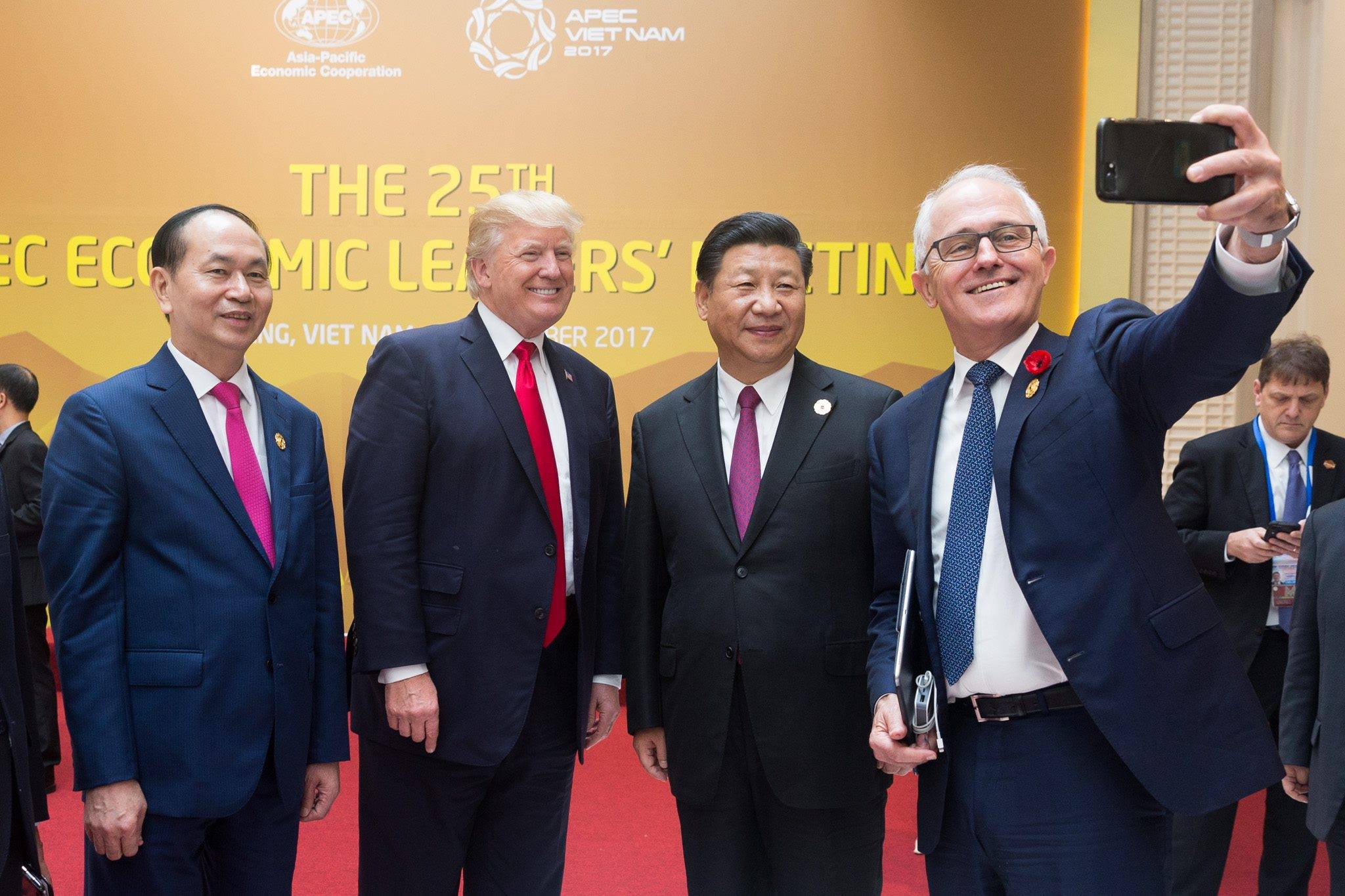
Turnbull takes a photograph with Presidents Xi and Trump in 2017

Australia was amongst the firmest opponents of China's territorial claims to the South China Sea. In July 2016, following the ruling by an international tribunal which held that China holds "no historical rights" to the South China Sea based on the "nine-dash line" map, Australia issued a joint statement with Japan and the United States calling for China to abide by the ruling, as "final and legally binding on both parties." In response, Chinese state-run media called Australia a paper cat. Later in the year, in response to an Australian swimmer's critical comments towards Chinese swimmer Sun Yang over a past doping experience, state media labelled Australia "Britain's offshore prison... on the fringes of civilization." Later that year, Japanese, Indian, Australian and American officials met to continue security cooperation ahead of the ASEAN and East Asia Summits in November 2017. The meeting included discussion of China's increased prominence in the South China Sea, and may have signaled U.S. President Trump's interest in reviving a formal Quadrilateral with Australian, Indian, and Japanese cooperation. In public settings, relations appeared to be warm, the main political friction coming from the farming sector, losing patience that China was slow in opening its markets.

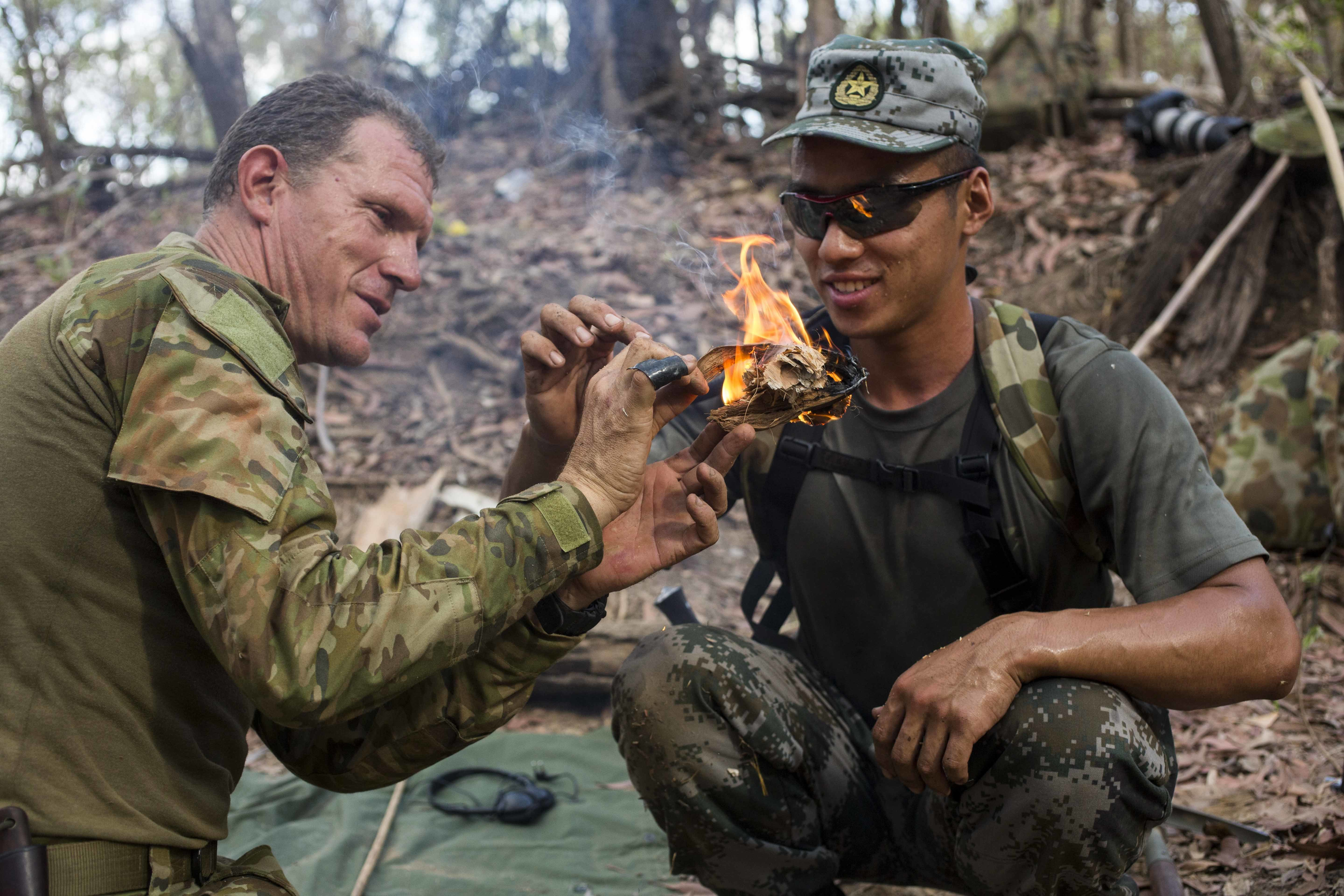
By mid 2016, Australia and China continued to participate in joint military training, such as Exercise Kowari

In June 2017 after a Four Corners investigation into purported Chinese attempts to influence Australian politicians and exert pressure on international students studying in Australia, Turnbull ordered a major inquiry into espionage and foreign interference laws. It also claimed that despite Australian Security Intelligence Organization warning both parties about Chinese interference in democratic processes, significant financial contributions continued to be accepted. A spokeswoman for the Chinese Foreign Ministry derided the investigation as "totally pointless" and suggested that Australian media was "creating obstacles" for further cooperation. Former Defense Secretary Dennis Richardson also claimed that China was conducting espionage in Australia and that intelligence agencies may be currently involved in stopping foreign interference. In December 2017, opposition MP Sam Dastyari resigned after a political scandal where he was accused of contradicting the Australian Labor Party's policy on the South China Sea, as well facing accusations of accepting financial favours from Chinese companies. Then Malcolm Turnbull expressed his criticism with "Australian people stand up" in both Chinese and English. Shortly afterwards, the Coalition government announced plans to ban foreign donations to Australian political parties and activist groups. This was a remarkable turn of events as Australia historically had no restrictions on political donations from outside of the country. When the Turnbull Government ruled against Huawei being able to provide 5G infrastructure, relations cooled even further.

=== Morrison government: 2018–2022 ===
In November 2019, the Australian news network Nine Network aired a report on alleged efforts by China to infiltrate the Parliament of Australia by recruiting car dealer Bo "Nick" Zhao to run in a constituency during an election, in what was called the 2019 Australian Parliament infiltration plot. Zhao was later found dead in a Melbourne hotel room with the cause of death initially undetermined. Prime Minister Scott Morrison said the incident was "deeply disturbing and troubling" and that "Australia is not naive to the threats that it faces" before cautioning "anyone leaping to any conclusions about these matters". Chinese foreign ministry spokesman Geng Shuang rejected the alleged plot and said that some Australian politicians, institutions and media outlets "reached a state of hysteria and extreme nervousness". In September 2020, a Victorian coroner ruled that Zhao's death was not suspicious, finding that he had died by suicide while experiencing financial difficulties ahead of sentencing for fraud offences.

In 2019, the espionage claims made by Wang Liqiang, attracted significant attention in Australia and internationally. Wang sought asylum in Australia after claiming to have knowledge of China's covert operations in Australia. The case was widely covered in Australian media, including a 60 Minutes documentary, and discussed in political debate, with Labor leader Anthony Albanese stating on November 23, 2019, that Wang potentially had a "legitimate claim" for protection visa, and Liberal MP Andrew Hastie advocating for his asylum, describing him as a "friend of democracy". According to The Sydney Morning Herald and The Age, Wang provided a sworn statement to the Australian Security Intelligence Organisation (ASIO) regarding alleged Chinese covert activities, and was held at an undisclosed location in Sydney. On 26 November 2019, the Australian Financial Review reported that ASIO and the Department of Home Affairs intended to take Wang's allegations seriously while also "separating fact from fiction". The Chinese Embassy in Australia dismissed Wang's claims and described him as a "fraud".

According to Zoya Sheftalovich and Stuart Lau in September 2021:

Nearly 10 years ago, Australia thought it was on the cusp of a beautiful friendship with China: It was opening up its economy to Beijing, wanted to teach Mandarin in schools and invited the Chinese president to address parliament. Now, that's all over. These days, Australia is buying up nuclear-powered submarines to fend off Beijing, barring the country from key markets and bristling at its relentless attempts to coerce Australian politicians and media.

According to Sam Roggeveen, an ex-senior strategic analyst at the Office of National Assessments, during Scott Morrison's prime ministership, there was "three years of near panic about the implications of China’s rise as a military power". Scott Morrison viewed China as a central strategic challenge, highlighting concerns about its growing military presence and regional ambitions. In 2020, he compared tensions in Asia to those of Europe in the 1930s and later described an “arc of autocracy” threatening global stability, with China prominently in focus. Nationals Party leader and then Deputy Prime Minister Barnaby Joyce stated that China appeared to be "starting a process of encircling Australia" through the establishment of military bases. At the same time, Defence Minister Peter Dutton described the sailing of a Chinese surveillance vessel approximately 50 nautical miles off the coast of a submarine communications facility in Western Australia as an "aggressive act."

==== Xinjiang and Hong Kong ====
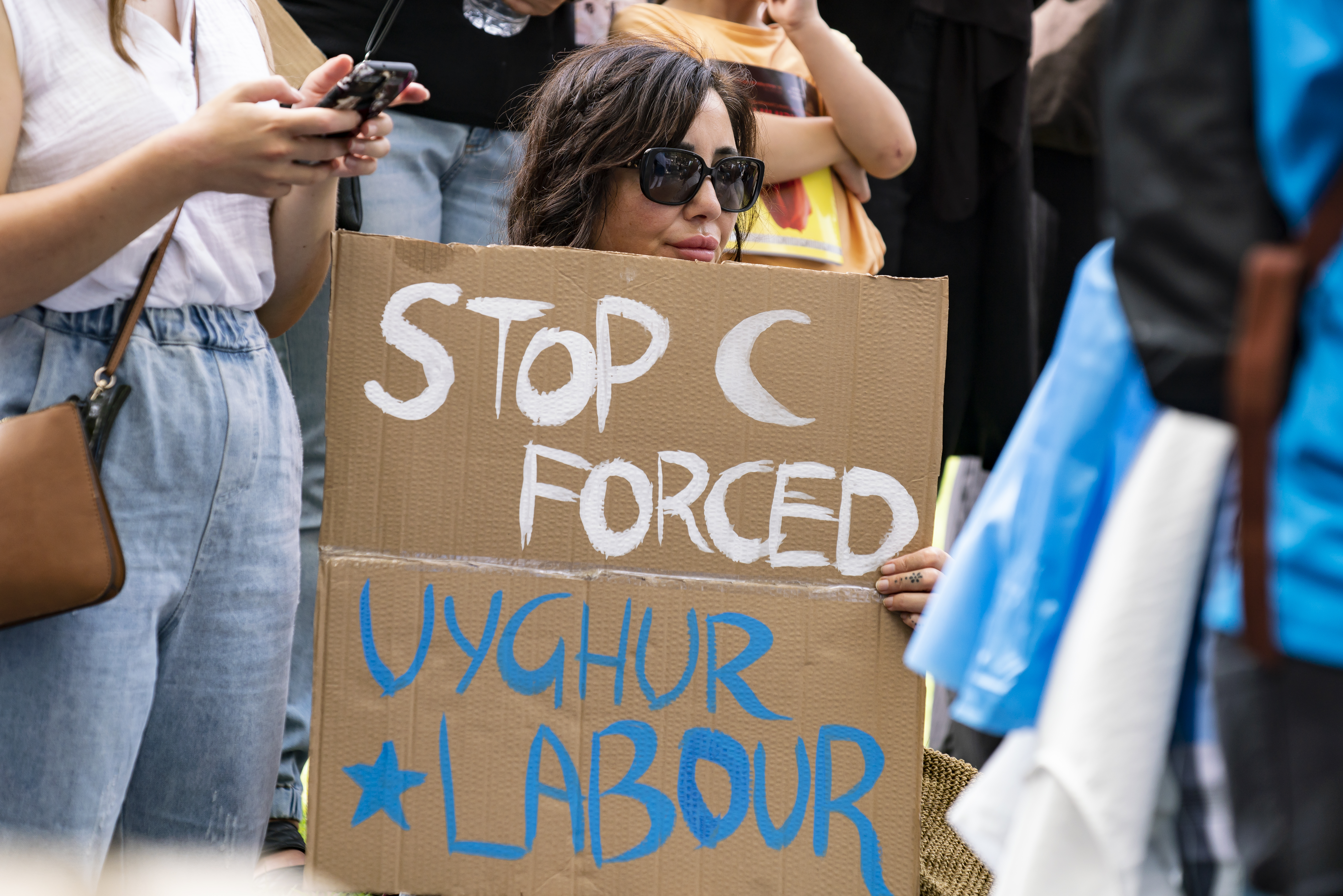
Pro-Uyghur demonstration in Melbourne, 2022

The Australian ambassador to the UN was among the 22 nations that signed a letter condemning China's arbitrary detention and mistreatment of the Uyghurs and other minority groups, urging the Chinese government to close the Xinjiang re-education camps, in July 2019.

In June 2020, Australia openly opposed the Hong Kong national security law. On 9 July 2020, Prime Minister Scott Morrison said that in response to the fear over China's new national security law, Australia has suspended the extradition treaty with Hong Kong. Australia was a part of a group of 39 countries that made a statement at the UN on 6 October 2020 to denounce China for its treatment of ethnic minorities and for curtailing freedoms in Hong Kong.

Following the 2021 Hong Kong legislative election in December 2021, the Australian Foreign Minister Marise Payne issued a joint statement with other Five Eyes foreign ministers criticising the exclusion of opposition candidates, the Hong Kong national security law, and the curtailment of media freedoms. The joint statement also urged Beijing to abide by its international obligations to protect human rights and freedoms in Hong Kong including those guaranteed by the Sino-British Joint Declaration. In response, the Chinese Embassy in Canberra claimed that the members of the Hong Kong Legislative Council had been "elected smoothly" and criticised Australia for alleged foreign interference.

On 8 December 2021, prime minister Morrison announced that the Australian government would not send any diplomats or officials to the 2022 Winter Olympics in Beijing, following a similar announcement by the United States government over human rights concerns in Xinjiang.

==== Call for independent inquiry on COVID-19 ====
According to The New York Times, many countries including Australia saw worsening relations with China during the COVID-19 pandemic. In June 2020, China's foreign ministry spokesperson Hua Chunying criticised Prime Minister Morrison after responding to a European Union report alleging that Beijing was disseminating disinformation about the pandemic. The Australian government's call for an independent investigation into the causes of the pandemic provoked angry responses from China, with Beijing calling it "a joke". Western commentators, including those at The Washington Post, identified China's subsequent targeting of Australian trade, particularly beef, barley, lobsters and coal, as being "de facto economic sanctions".

A spokesman for China's ministry of foreign affairs, Geng Shuang, said, "The urgent task for all countries is focusing on international cooperation rather than pointing fingers, demanding accountability and other non-constructive approaches." Chinese ambassador Cheng Jingye said that tourism and trade to Australia would suffer due to Australia's "attitude", adding "if the mood is going from bad to worse, people would think, 'Why we go to such a country that is not so friendly to China?'" Hu Xijin, editor-in-chief of the Global Times, stated "Australia is always there, making trouble. It is a bit like chewing gum stuck on the sole of China's shoes. Sometimes you have to find a stone to rub it off." Such statements have been interpreted as attempted economic coercion against Australia. Australia's proposal, however, later evolved into a compromise motion endorsed by a record 137 countries including Australia and China at the World Health Assembly.

By April 2020, some analysts concluded China's trade sanctions were simply an attempt to punish Australia for adopting policies and positions that China dislikes, and had been planned well before Australia's call for an independent inquiry.

==== "14 grievances" - China's demands to Australia ====
On 17 November 2020, an official from China's embassy in Canberra presented Nine journalist Jonathan Kearsley with a list of 14 Chinese grievances against Australia. The official added at the time that "China is angry. If you make China the enemy, China will be the enemy" and that if Australia backed away from the policies on the list, it would be "conducive to a better atmosphere". The statement was seen as an open threat towards Australia. The list, that became known as the "14 grievances" read as follows:

1. "foreign investment decisions, with acquisitions blocked on opaque national security grounds in contravention of ChAFTA/since 2018, more than 10 Chinese investment projects have been rejected by Australia citing ambiguous and unfounded "national security concerns" and putting restrictions in areas like infrastructure, agriculture and animal husbandry"
2. "the decision banning Huawei Technologies and ZTE from the 5G network, over unfounded national security concerns, doing the bidding of the US by lobbying other countries"
3. "foreign interference legislation viewed as targeting China and in the absence of any evidence"
4. "politicization and stigmatization of the normal exchanges and cooperation between China and Australia and creating barriers and imposing restrictions, including the revoke [sic?] of visas for Chinese scholars"
5. "call for an international independent inquiry into the COVID-19 virus, acted as a political manipulation echoing the US attack on China"
6. "the incessant wanton interference in China's Xinjiang, Hong Kong and Taiwan affairs; spearheading the crusade against China in certain multinational forums"
7. "the first non littoral country to make a statement on the South China Sea to the United Nations"
8. "siding with the US' anti-China campaign and spreading disinformation imported from the US around China's efforts of containing COVID-19"
9. "the latest legislation to scrutinise agreements with a foreign government targeting towards China and aiming to torpedo the Victorian participation in B&R"
10. "provided funding to anti-China think tank for spreading untrue reports, peddling lies around Xinjiang and so-called China infiltration aimed at manipulating public opinion against China"
11. "the early dawn search and reckless seizure of Chinese journalists' homes and properties without any charges and giving explanations"
12. "thinly veiled allegations against China on cyber attacks without any evidence"
13. "outrageous condemnation of the governing party of China by MPs and racist attacks against Chinese or Asian people"
14. "an unfriendly or antagonistic report on China by media, poisoning the atmosphere of bilateral relations"

Many of the points reflected a statement made by Wang Wenbin a few days earlier, with particular reference to the 10 rejected Chinese investment projects, the ban on China building Australia's 5G network building. One year later, the acting ambassador to Australia, Wang Xining, said China's list of grievances is, in fact, "longer than 14 points".

==== Zhao Lijian incident ====
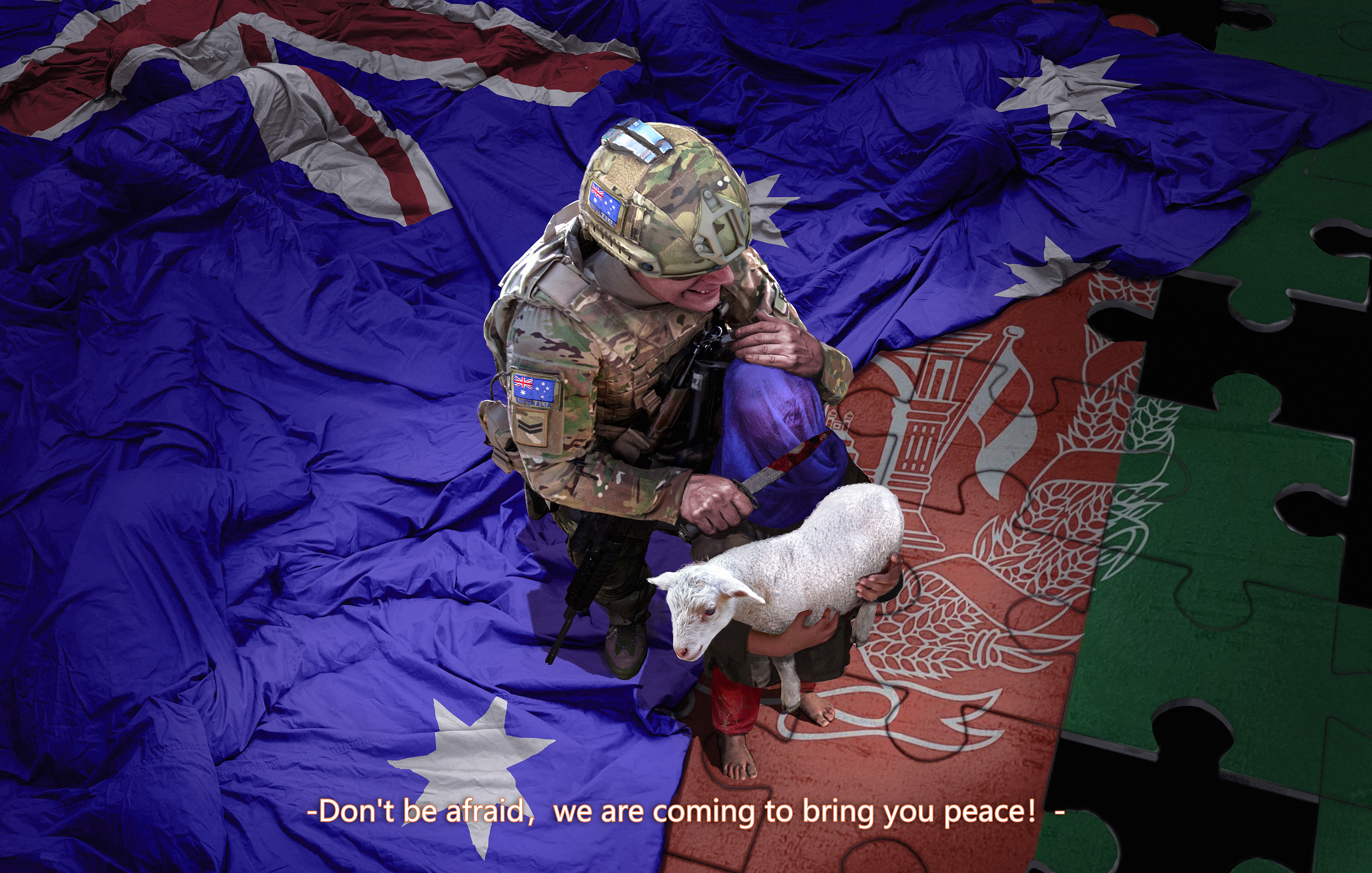
The digitally-created image Peace Force (和平之师)

On 30 November 2020, the Australian prime minister Scott Morrison demanded a formal apology from the government of China for posting an "offensive" and "outrageous" computer image of an Australian soldier holding a bloodied knife against the throat of an Afghan child, a reference to the Brereton Report in which two 14-year-old Afghanistan boys had their throats slit by Australia soldiers and covered up, which was originally created by the Chinese internet political cartoonist Wuheqilin and shared by the Chinese foreign ministry spokesman Zhao Lijian. The demand was made by Morrison at an unscheduled press conference held on Monday afternoon exclusively in response to the circulation of the image. In response, the Chinese foreign ministry rejected the calls to apologise, insisting that the Australian government should be apologising for the loss of life in Afghanistan. Twitter refused Morrison's request to remove Zhao's tweet, while the Chinese social media platform WeChat censored Morrison's message directed at the Chinese community, in which he described Australia's dealing with the alleged war crimes in an "honest and transparent way".

Morrison later opposed "further amplification" and struck a more conciliatory tone, saying the government had made clear its response to the post.

The New Zealand prime minister Jacinda Ardern and the French government voiced support for Australia and criticised Zhao's Twitter post, while the Russian government stated that "the circumstances make us truly doubt the genuine capacity of Australian authorities to actually hold accountable all the servicemen who are guilty of such crimes". The Afghanistan Times Daily published an editorial welcoming both Morrison's pledge to bring the offenders to justice and China's call for more attention to unlawful killings of civilians in Afghanistan.

==== Military tensions ====
In July 2021, some Chinese ships were seen near Australia, at a time when defence force exercises were taking place. Defence minister Peter Dutton said that he was shocked to see them sailing near the country.

==== 2021: Australia's acquisition of nuclear powered submarines ====
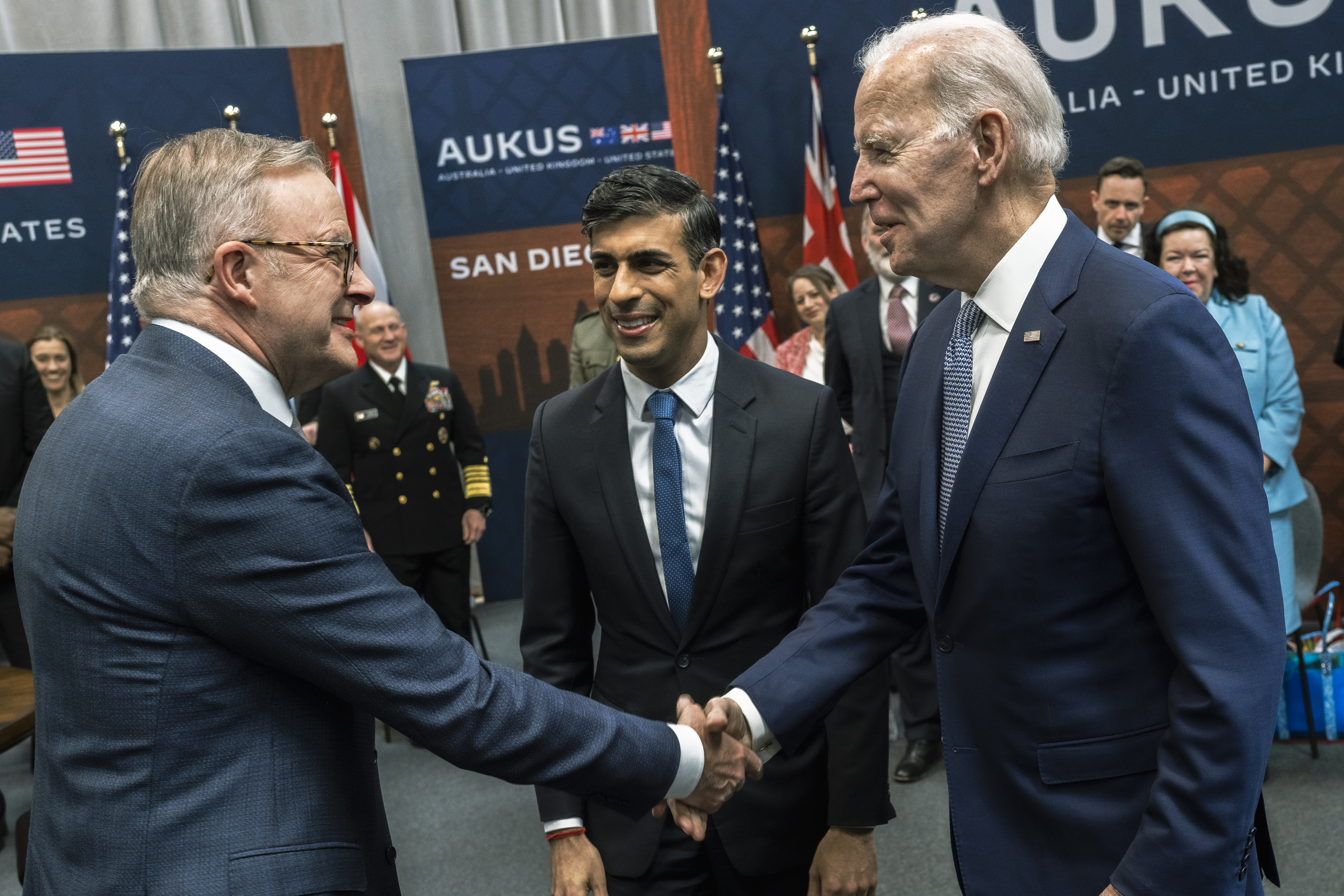
After the formation of the AUKUS security pact, China responded angrily

On 16 September 2021, Australia announced the AUKUS security partnership that included Australia acquiring nuclear powered submarines with assistance from the United States and the United Kingdom. No nuclear weapons were involved, and the submarines would carry conventional weapons only. Although China was not specifically mentioned in the news announcements, critics interpreted it as a major blow to Australian-Chinese relationship, by firmly allying Australia with the United States in military terms in the region. For the first time the United States and the United Kingdom would be sharing their top-secret nuclear submarine propulsion technology, which has a far wider range and lethal value than diesel-electric powered submarines. Beijing reacted angrily. The Chinese Ministry of Foreign Affairs, told the press that the deal would:

seriously damage regional peace and stability, exacerbate an arms race and harm international nuclear nonproliferation agreements....This is utterly irresponsible conduct.

According to Rory Medcalf, head of the National Security College at the Australian National University, "The level of Chinese economic coercion and cyber espionage against Australia was once unimaginable, so our security agencies have learned to consider worst-case possibilities....[AUKUS] is an alignment made in Beijing." Under AUKUS, Sheftalovich and Lau said, the three allies would share advanced technologies "including artificial intelligence, cybersecurity, quantum computing, underwater systems and long-range strike capabilities." Michael Shoebridge, a director at the influential Australian Strategic Policy Institute (ASPI) think tank, said, "It's a remarkable collapse in Australia-China relations and a massive deterioration in Australia's security outlook that's led to this outcome."

Australian opposition to the AUKUS submarine announcement included Former Prime Minister Paul Keating's National Press Club address, and in culture, Jennifer Maiden's poetry collection The China Shelf.

Victor Gao, a Chinese academic, reacted strongly to the deal, warning that it could make Australia a target for nuclear attacks. Gao described the agreement with the United States and the United Kingdom as a "gross violation of international law" and accused Australia of acting without strategic foresight. He argued that the move undermined regional stability and drew Australia into potential military conflicts alongside the U.S., suggesting it compromised Australia's sovereignty and exposed it to severe geopolitical consequences.

==== Sino-Solomon Islands defence agreement ====
Australia has provided defence and security assistance to the Solomon Islands since 1927, their soldiers both fighting against the Japanese in 1942–43. In late March 2022, a draft security pact between China and the Solomon Islands emerged, which would allow Beijing to deploy military forces in the country and establish its own military base, thought Prime Minister Sogavare later denied this. Senior Australian officials including Morrison, Defence Minister Peter Dutton, and Foreign Minister Marise Payne expressed concerns about the expansion of Chinese influence in the South Pacific region, which Australia regards as its "backyard." In response to Australian criticism of the proposed security pact, Sogavare defended the security pact with China on national sovereignty grounds. He also criticised the leaking of the document and objecting to the Australian media coverage for sensationalising the issue. In addition, the Chinese Government defended the bilateral pact and rejected Australian criticism that Beijing was coercing the Solomon Islands.

=== Albanese Government: 2022–present ===
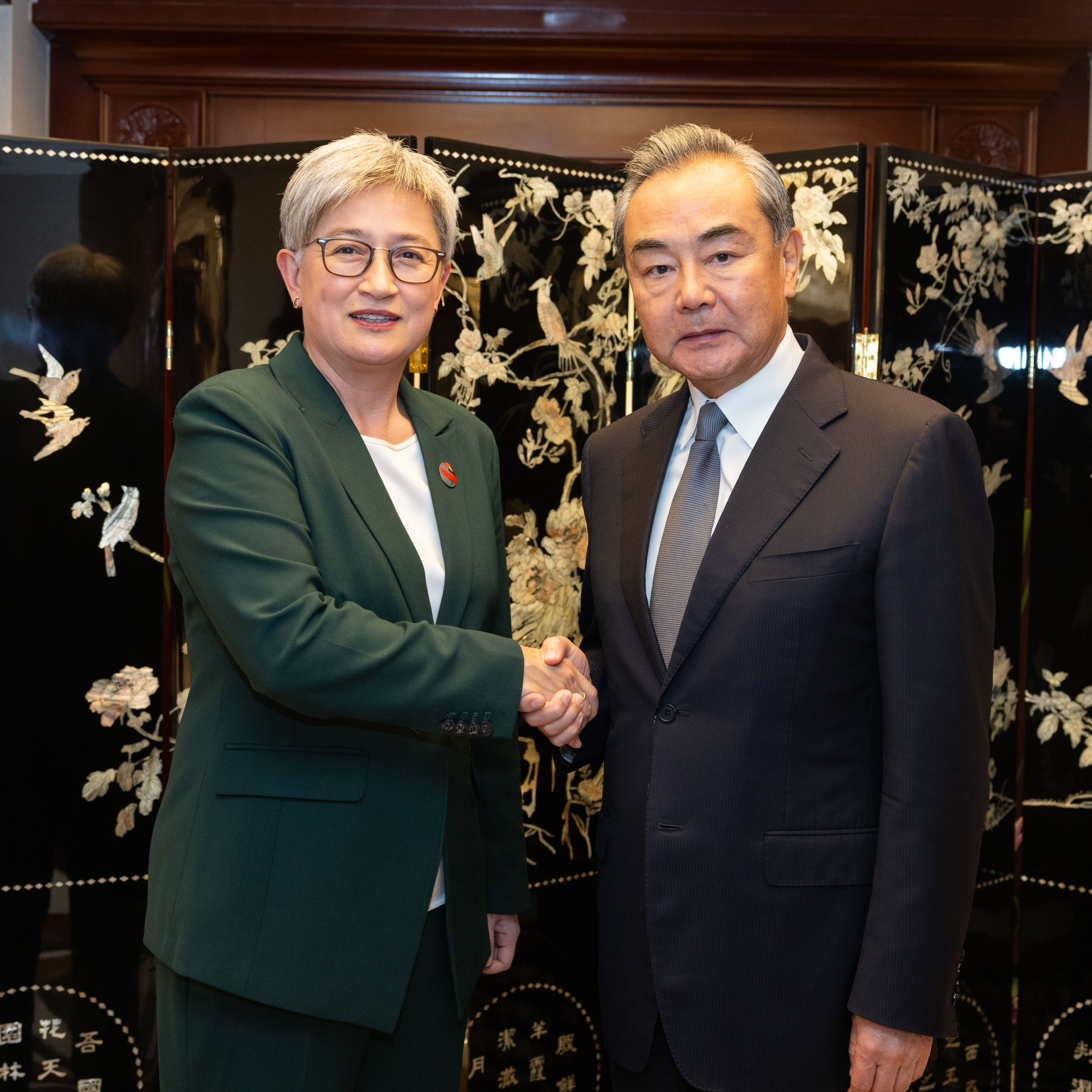
Foreign ministers Penny Wong and Wang Yi, of Australia and China respectively, meet in 2023.

The relationship between the two countries started to improve after Anthony Albanese of the Labor Party won the 2022 federal elections. In mid-June 2022, Deputy Prime Minister and Defence Minister Richard Marles met with Chinese Defence Minister Wei Fenghe at the Shangri-La Dialogue in Singapore. This was the highest level bilateral contact between the two countries for almost three years. Marles and Wei discussed the recent Chinese interception of a Royal Australian Air Force (RAAF) Boeing P-8 Poseidon over the South China Sea and Oceania. At the Shangri-La Dialogue, Marles reiterated the Albanese government's desire to pursue a "productive relationship" with China while still upholding its own national interests and regional security within a rules-based system. Marles also sought to allay Chinese concerns that AUKUS was similar to NATO, stating that AUKUS sought to foster the sharing and development of capabilities between Australia, the United Kingdom, and United States. In November 2022 prime minister Albanese met with Chinese leader Xi Jinping during the G20 summit in Bali. In December 2022 Australian Foreign Minister Penny Wong visited China, the first Australian minister to visit the country since 2019, where she met Chinese Foreign Minister Wang Yi.

In March 2023 Albanese officially commenced AUKUS with president Biden and United Kingdom prime minister Rishi Sunak, which was negatively received by China. Under AUKUS, Australia will purchase Virginia class nuclear powered submarines from the United States and also build a new class of nuclear powered submarines SSN-AUKUS in Australia in cooperation with the United States and the United Kingdom. In early 2023, China ended its unofficial ban on imports of Australian coal, with all restrictions reportedly being lifted by 14 March. On 11 April the countries announced that they reached an agreement over disputes over China's barley imports from Australia, with China agreeing to review its tariffs in exchange for Australia suspending a case against China in the World Trade Organization (WTO). A day later, Ma Zhaoxu, Chinese Vice Minister of Foreign Affairs, visited Australia, the first by a senior Chinese official since 2017. In May, Australian Minister for Trade and Tourism Don Farrell visited Beijing, the first visit by an Australian trade minister to China since 2019; Farrell said the trip "is just another step in the road of stabilising the relationship". Chinese ambassador to Australia Xiao Qian announced on 18 May that China would allow imports of Australian timber, which was suspended in 2020.

In September 2023 the two countries held a High-Level Dialogue in Beijing, the first in three years, with former trade minister Craig Emerson leading the Australian delegation, while China was represented by former foreign minister Li Zhaoxing. Later that month, Albanese met with Chinese Premier Li Qiang on the sidelines of the East Asia Summit held in Jakarta. On 11 October Australian journalist Cheng Lei, a former news anchor of the China Global Television who was detained in September 2020, was released and returned to Australia. Since her detention, the Australian government had campaigned for her release. Between 4 and 7 November, Albanese visited Shanghai and Beijing, becoming the first Australian prime minister to visit China in seven years. The trip, described as an effort to get relations between Australia and China on track, coincided with the 50th anniversary of Prime Minister Gough Whitlam's visit to China, the first by an Australian prime minister. During the trip, he gave a speech at the China International Import Expo, and met with Premier Li Qiang and Chinese leader Xi Jinping.

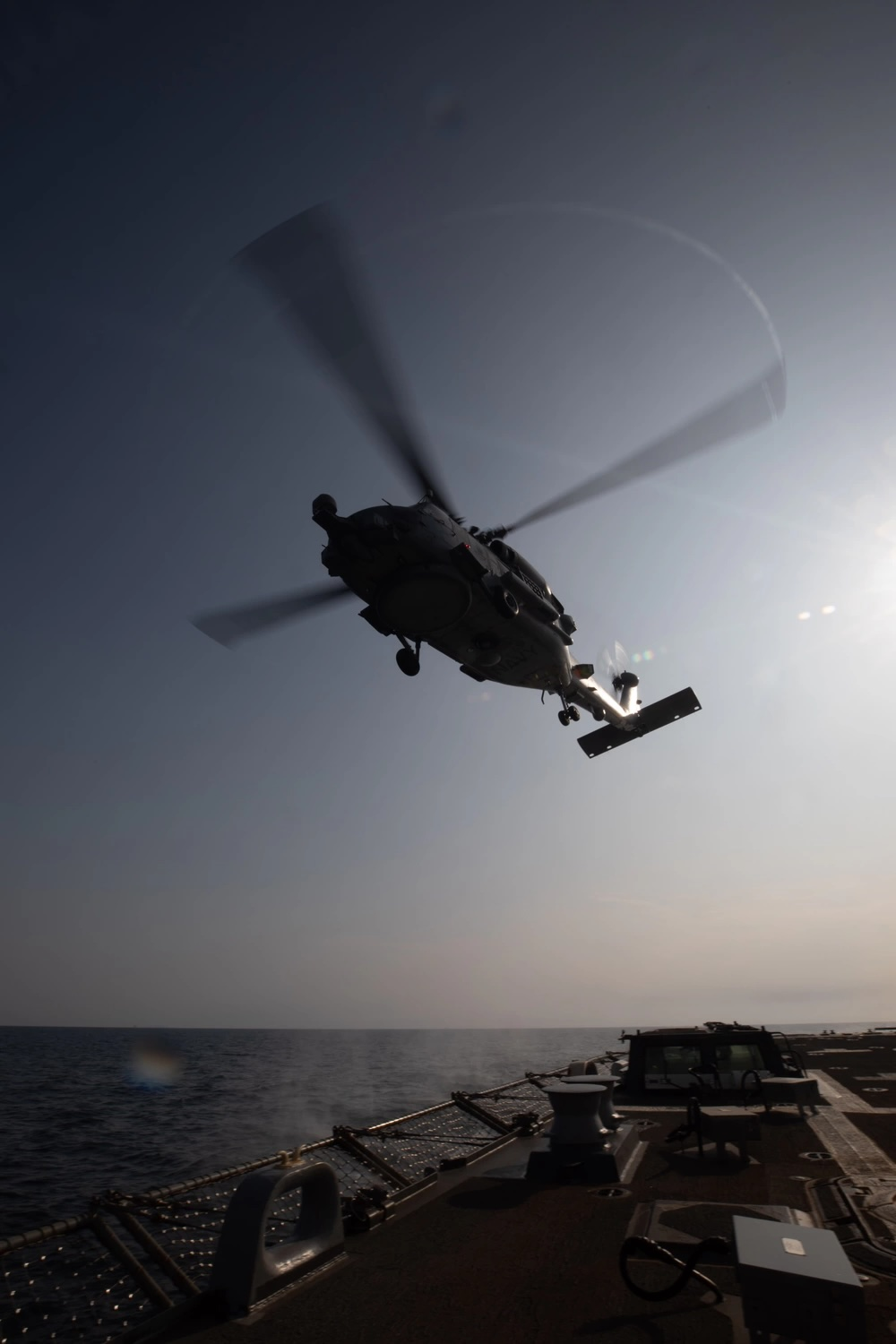
Royal Australian Navy MH-60R Seahawk operating in East China Sea, 2023

While operating in Japan's waters in November 2023, Royal Australian Navy divers from HMAS Toowoomba were preparing to clear away fishing nets from the propellers of the ship. Though asked to stay clear the Chinese destroyer Ningbo, used its hull-mounted medium/high-frequency sonar system to attack and injure the divers. At the time, Beijing denied that the incident took place, though Australia's Vice Admiral Mark Hammond is known to have later directly raised Australia's concerns with China's Chief Admiral, Hu Zhongming

In early February 2024 Defence Minister Marles confirmed that Australia would brief New Zealand about AUKUS Pillar 2 developments following a joint bilateral meeting between Australian and New Zealand foreign and defence ministers in Melbourne. During the meeting Wong, Marles and their New Zealand counterparts Winston Peters, and Judith Collins issued a joint statement expressing concerns about human rights violations in Xinjiang, Tibet and Hong Kong. In response, the Chinese Embassy in Wellington issued a statement condemning critical statements about China's internal affairs and describing AUKUS as "counter to the letter and spirit of the international nuclear non-proliferation regime." In mid-March 2024, Wong met with Wang Yi in Canberra Penny Wong during the Australia-China Foreign and Strategic Dialogue.

In May 2024, 20 Australian lawmakers, all belonging to the Inter-Parliamentary Alliance on China (IPAC), revealed that they had been targeted by Chinese spies (APT31) when the United States Department of Justice indicted seven Chinese hackers the month prior. The same month, Defence Minister Marles denounced an incident in which a Chinese J-10 dropped flares in close proximity to an Australian MH60R Seahawk helicopter. The helicopter had been operating off HMAS Hobart in international waters in the Yellow Sea, as it enforced UN-mandated sanctions against North Korea.

In mid-June 2024 Prime Minister Albanese hosted Premier Li Qiang during his state visit to Australia. China agreed to extend visa-free access to Australians visiting China for up to 15 days. The two governments also agreed to provide reciprocal five-year multiple entry visas for tourism, business and visiting family members. The two governments also agreed to hold talks on improving bilateral military relations to avoid incidents such as the 2023 sonar attack on HMAS Toowoomba. Premier Li also met with Opposition leader Peter Dutton and Australian Governor-General David Hurley. Qiang also visited a lithium plant in Perth and Australian business leaders. Despite a largely productive visit, an incident occurred when Chinese officials attempted to obstruct Sky News Australia journalist Cheng Lei, who had previously been released from Chinese imprisonment.

On 13 February 2025, the Australian Defence Department lodged a formal complaint with the People's Liberation Army following an incident in the South China Sea on 11 February in which a Chinese fighter jet released flares within 30 metres (98 ft) of an RAAF P-8 Poseidon aircraft. On 20 February, the Australian and New Zealand Defence Ministers Marles and Judith Collins confirmed that the Australian and New Zealand militaries were tracking three Chinese warships that were sailing through Australia's exclusive economic zone near Sydney. The warships conducted live-fire exercises without official notice. In response to Chinese naval live-fire exercises disrupting international flights in the Tasman Sea, Foreign Minister Wong met with Chinese Foreign Minister Wang Yi at the G20 summit in South Africa to raise Australian concerns about Chinese naval activities near Australia.

On 10 April 2025, Albanese and Marles declined Chinese Ambassador to Australia Xiao Qian's invitation for Australia to "join hands" against US President Donald Trump's tariffs. Albanese said that "Australians would speak for ourselves" while Marles said that Australia "would not be holding China's hand." Albanese went on a six-day visit to China in July 2025, touring Beijing, Shanghai, and Chengdu. Criticizing his visits to the Great Wall and a panda breeding center, the Coalition called the trip "indulgent", although Albanese responded by suggesting that the visits were about showing respect to China. According to critics, Albanese ignored the issue of human rights in China and focused only on trade.

In October 2025, Australia and Papua New Guinea signed a historic bilateral defense treaty containing obligations of mutual defense. The agreement drew concern from China, which stated that such treaties should not be exclusive or undermine the legitimate interests of third parties. The Chinese Embassy in Papua New Guinea emphasized that the pact should refrain from targeting any country. The same month, a Chinese Su-35 dropped flares near an Australian P-8 Poseidon on patrol over the South China Sea, prompting Australia to label the encounter unsafe and unprofessional. China responded by accusing Australia of illegally entering airspace over the Paracel Islands and lodged a formal complaint. In November 2025, National People's Congress Standing Committee Chairman Zhao Leji visited Australia, where he met with Prime Minister Anthony Albanese.

Following the signing of an Australian-Fijian defence treaty known as the Ocean of Peace Alliance on 6 July 2026, Chinese Foreign Ministry spokeswoman Mao Ning urged Australia to respect the independence of Pacific island nations and "to avoid targeting or harming the interests of any third parties." On that same day, the Chinese military tested a long-range ballistic missile in the Pacific Ocean, triggering protests from Australia, New Zealand and Japan. In response, Defence Minister Marles and Foreign Minister Wong expressed concern about any actions which undermined peace and stability in the Pacific region. Mao said that the missile launch was a routine Chinese military exercise and denied that it was linked to the Ocean of Peace Alliance.

In November 2026, Prime Minister Albanese visited Shenzhen to attend the APEC China 2026. He met with Xi, who said the two countries had established "full turnaround" in their bilateral relationship and said "China-Australia friendship is what the people want". Albanese praised Shenzhen, saying he had visited the city first in the 1990s, and that Shenzhen's "remarkable" growth "embodies the rise and growth of China". He said the two countries should "manage our differences, but not be defined by them". Afterwards, Albanese visited Beijing, where he met with Premier Li Qiang and attended the Australia-China business summit; Albanese and Li agreed that 2027 would be the Australia-China Year of Tourism. He also met with NPCSC Chairman Zhao Leji.

== Immigration to Australia ==
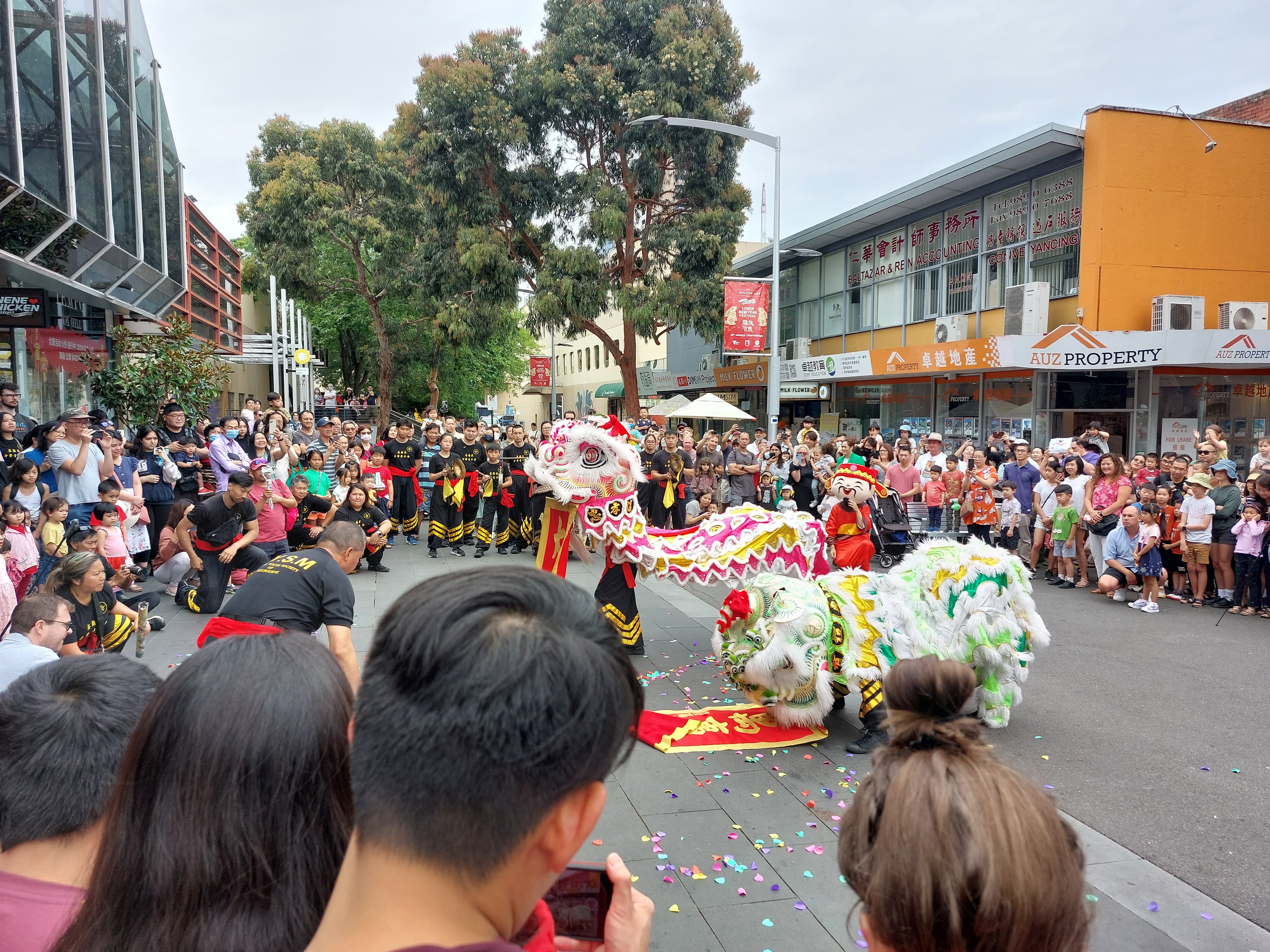
Chinese New Year celebrations at Box Hill, Victoria, home to one of the largest Chinese Australian communities in the country.

China is one of the largest countries of origin for immigrants to Australia, particularly for permanent residents, temporary foreign workers, and international students. At the 2021 census, 1,390,637 Australian residents identified themselves as having Chinese ancestry, accounting for 5.5% of the total population. In 2019, the Australian Bureau of Statistics estimated that there were 677,240 Australian residents born in mainland China, 101,290 born in Hong Kong and 59,250 born in Taiwan.

== Freedom of navigation exercises and responses ==
Australia engages in "freedom of navigation exercises" (also known as "freedom of navigation operations" or FONOPs) in one of the many disputed sea routes in the region between the two countries. Some of these are conducted in cooperation with the United States, New Zealand, or other countries. Areas of dispute include the South China Sea and Taiwan Strait. China has objected to United States and allied countries' FONOPs in the South China Sea as "provocative," contending that foreign military ships traveling through territorial seas and foreign EEZs does not constitute "innocent passage". China sometimes responds with naval exercises near Australian waters.

In December 2025, Australian defense officials stated that the country was monitoring a Chinese navy flotilla operating in the Philippine Sea. According to The Guardian, the deployment occurred at the same time as the Australian government announced a major defense overhaul that included plans to expand surveillance and maritime capabilities. Australian authorities described the monitoring as part of routine regional security awareness, while analysts noted that such movements reflected ongoing strategic competition between Australia and China in the western Pacific.

== Public opinion ==
In 2018, in the Lowy Institute poll there had a sharp rise in the proportion of the Australian population who say the Australian government is "allowing too much investment from China". This number rose from 56 per cent in 2014 to 72 per cent in 2018.

In 2021, 42% of Australians believed China was likely to attack Australia and 49% believed the same for Taiwan. 13% believed that an attack on Taiwan by China will happen soon. 62% of Australians also believed that China was a "very aggressive" country.

In 2022, a poll conducted by the Lowy Institute showed that 51% of Australians would support sending military support to Taiwan if China were to invade, up from 43% in 2021. The same survey showed only 12% trusted China on foreign affairs, down from 16% in 2021 and 52% in 2018.

In 2025, according to a Lowy Institute poll, Australian public opinion on China is nearly evenly divided, with 50% viewing it as an economic partner and 47% as a security threat. Although perceptions have improved slightly since their lowest point in 2022, trust and confidence in China remain low, with 69% of Australians believing it is likely China will become a military threat within the next 20 years. Additionally, 67% support Australia acquiring nuclear-powered submarines, and 60% favor increased cooperation with allies to deter China's potential use of military force. Former Prime Minister Scott Morrison, while referring to the poll, stated that shifting public attitudes in Australia toward viewing China more as an economic partner than a security threat reflected the effectiveness of the Chinese Communist Party's "influence operations". He warned that such changes in perception were part of a deliberate CCP strategy to weaken democratic vigilance by fostering complacency. Morrison emphasized that this manipulation of public opinion posed a serious risk, asserting that it was vital for citizens in Western democracies to remain alert to the underlying strategic threat from Beijing.

A survey published in 2026 by the Pew Research Center found that 31% of Australians had a favorable view of China, while 67% had an unfavorable view.

=== As a military threat ===
Question: Do you think it is likely or unlikely that China will become a military threat to Australia in the next 20 years?
Year	Somewhat likely	Very likely	Likely (total)	Change
2009	15%	26%	41%	—
2010	19%	27%	46%	+5%
2011	18%	26%	44%	-2%
2012	14%	26%	40%	-4%
2013	16%	25%	41%	+1%
2014	19%	29%	48%	+7%
2015	14%	25%	39%	-9%
2017	15%	31%	46%	+7%
2018	14%	31%	45%	-1%
2022	32%	43%	75%	+30%
2023	29%	46%	75%	—
2024	25%	46%	71%	-4%
2025	27%	42%	69%	-2%
2026	20%	42%	62%	-7%
Source: Lowy Institute

=== As an economic partner or a security threat ===
Question: In your own view, is China more of an economic partner or more of a security threat to Australia?
Year	Economic partner	Security threat	Both
2015	77%	15%	4%
2017	79%	13%	5%
2018	82%	12%	0%
2020	55%	41%	3%
2021	34%	63%	1%
2022	33%	63%	3%
2023	44%	52%	2%
2024	44%	53%	2%
2025	50%	47%	2%
2026	61%	36%	2%
Source: Lowy Institute

== Resident diplomatic missions ==
of Australia in China

- Beijing (Embassy)
- Chengdu (Consulate-General)
- Guangzhou (Consulate-General)
- Hong Kong (Consulate-General)
- Shanghai (Consulate-General)

of China in Australia

- Canberra (Embassy)
- Adelaide (Consulate-General)
- Brisbane (Consulate-General)
- Melbourne (Consulate-General)
- Perth (Consulate-General)
- Sydney (Consulate-General)

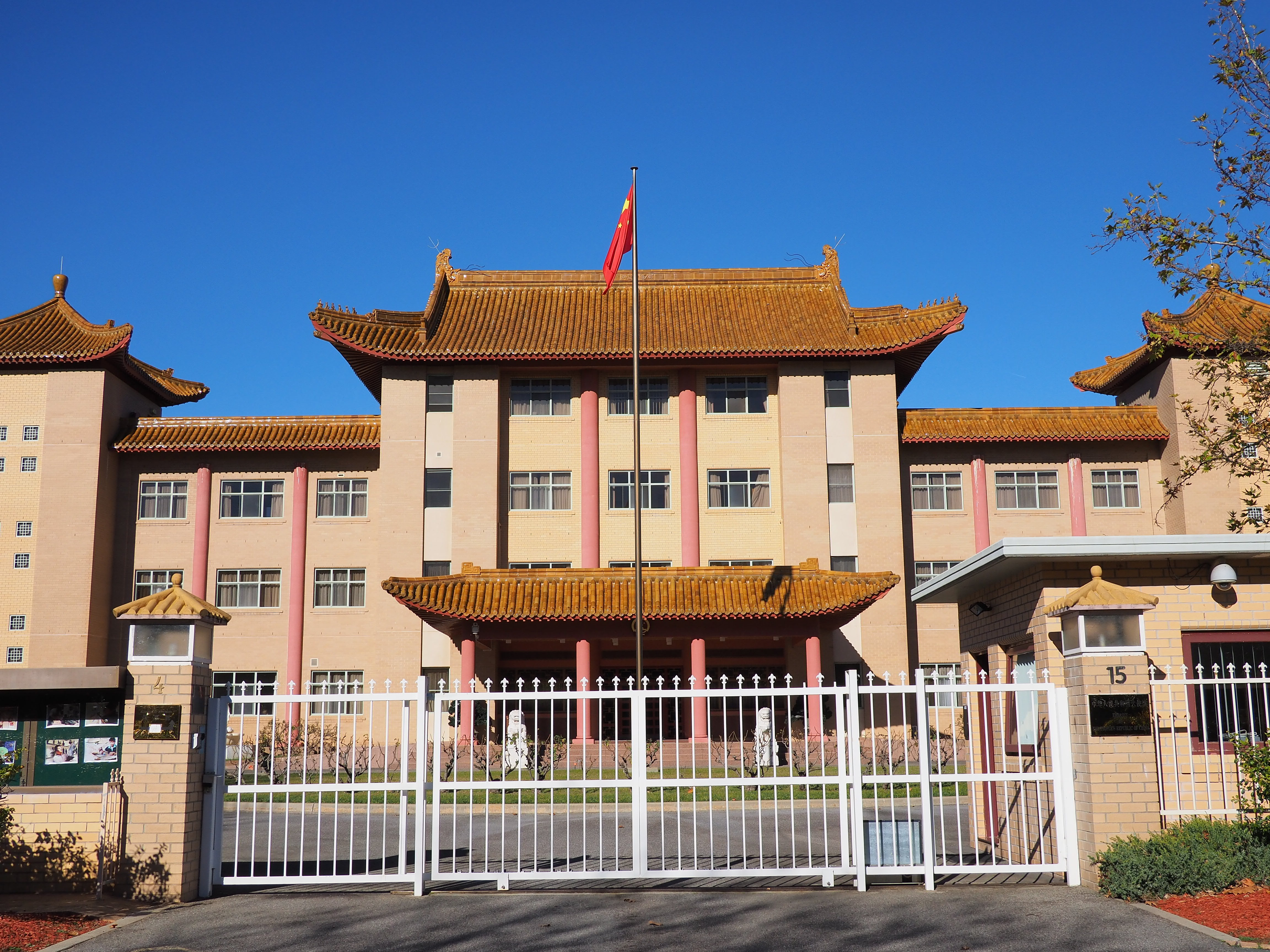
Embassy of China in Canberra

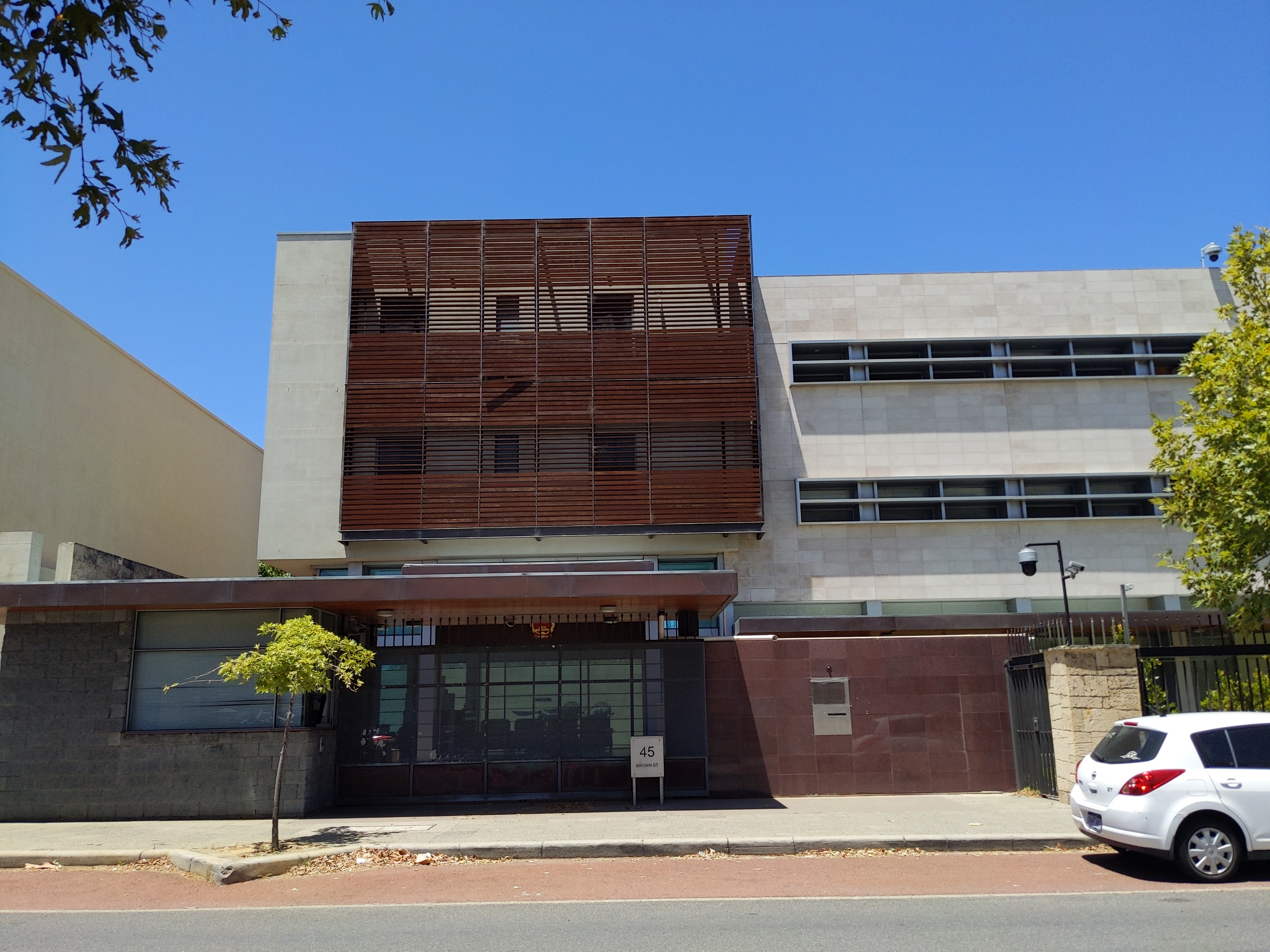
Consulate-General of China in Perth

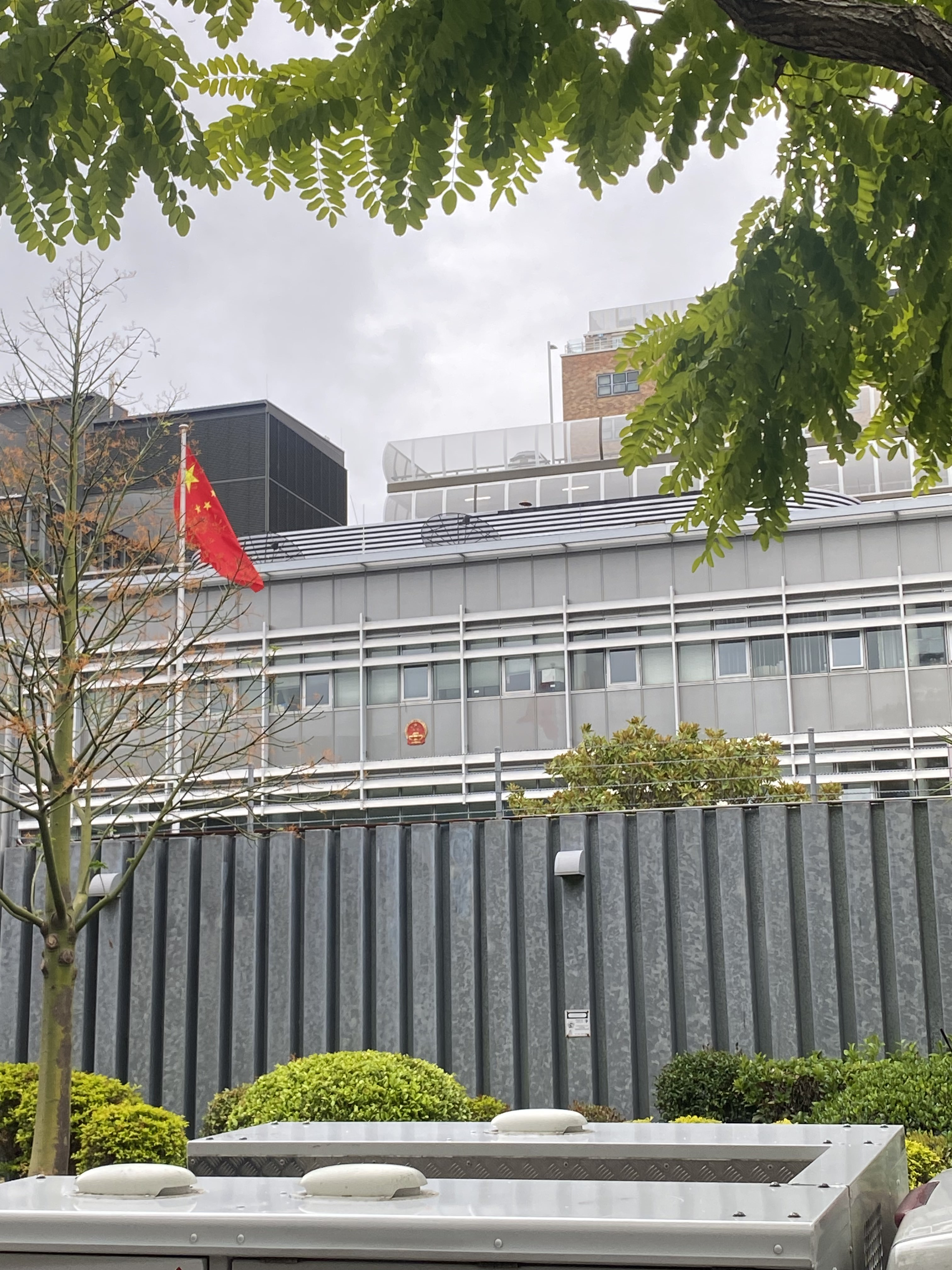
Consulate-General of China in Sydney

== See also ==
- Australians in China
- Chinese Australians
- China–Australia Migratory Bird Agreement
- Daigou § Australia
- Diplomatic history of Australia
- Foreign relations of China
- Sino-Pacific relations
