= Australia China Youth Association =

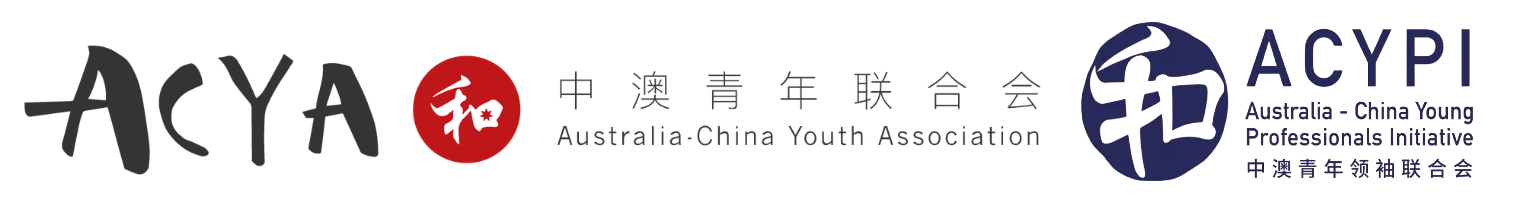
- Caption ACYA and ACYPI logos
- Founded: 2008
- Chair: Joyce Zhuo
- CEO: Mackenzie Lang
- Website: www.acya.org.au

The Australia–China Youth Association (ACYA) is an international non-governmental organisation that aims to strengthen ties between young people in Australia and China through bilateral initiatives in the areas of careers, education, and people-to-people links. ACYA is a volunteer-run nonprofit organisation that comprises over 7000 members spread across 15 chapters in Australia, including all Group of Eight universities, and six China-based chapters in Beijing, Shanghai, Chengdu, Guangzhou, Wuhan, and Taipei.

== History ==
ACYA was founded in 2008 in Wudaokou, Beijing, by three Australian National University undergraduate students—Henry Makeham, Huw Pohlner and Dominic Delany—then on exchange at Peking University, Renmin University and Tsinghua University, respectively.

ACYA's major sponsor is the National Foundation for Australia–China Relations of the Department of Foreign Affairs and Trade (Australia). ACYA was one of only three youth organisations to be commended by name in the Australian Government's 2012 'Australia in the Asian Century' White Paper.

In 2018 ACYA expanded to include the ACYA Women's Network (ACYAWN) founded by Yifan Wang, with the mission 'to create a support network of young women that empowers them to unlock their potential, embrace global citizenship, and inspire them to become leaders'.That same year, ACYA and one of its previous subentities, the Engaging China Project, merged.

In 2026, ACYA and one of its initial spinoffs, the Australia–China Young Professionals Initiative, reunited under the new parent entity Australia–China Youth Group.

== Activities ==
ACYA's signature event is the annual Australia–China Emerging Leaders Summit (ACELS), which brings together ACYA leaders from across Australia and China for intensive workshops on leadership in the Australia–China space, and has been hailed by Xinhua as "fortifying the fortunes and feelings of the two key trading partners...while also ensuring the tidal ebbs and flows of politics and power plays in no way hinder the growing ties between Chinese and Australian youths." ACELS has grown to become the largest bilateral forum connecting youth from Australia and China and has received endorsement from high-level industry leaders and government officials.

In 2025 ACYA's Women's Network introduced the ACYA International Women's Day luncheon that features prominent speakers on topics related to women's empowerment and professional development in the Australia–China space.

ACYA chapters run hundreds of social, academic, and professional events each year and create communities for Australian and Chinese young people to discover each other's cultures, languages, and perspectives, and forge lasting friendships that bridge the cultural divide.

ACYA has previously administered significant educational scholarship programs that enable Australian students to learn the Chinese language at Renmin University of China and National Taiwan Normal University, and a 2-year MBA scholarship for an Australian student to study at the Renmin University School of Business.

ACYA also manages internship programs with Austrade, Peking University Australian Studies Centre, Tsinghua University, Asialink, Australia China Business Council, Australian Chamber of Commerce in Beijing, China Policy, and Thirst NGO.

== Role in Australia–China Relations ==
ACYA is prominent within the youth and education arenas of Australia–China relations, being acknowledged by the Australia–China Council as one of the key youth initiatives "that helps to connect younger generations of Australians and Chinese". ACYA has been recognised by Australian media such as The Australian Financial Review, The Australian, and Triple J as a major proponent of bilateral youth engagement and 'Asia literacy' in Australia.

ACYA is also the progenitor of other prominent Australia–China youth initiatives such as the Australia–China Youth Dialogue (ACYD), Australia–China Young Professionals Initiative (ACYPI), and Engaging China Project (ECP).In 2018 ECP merged back into ACYA, and in 2026 ACYA and ACYPI reunited under the new parent entity Australia–China Youth Group.
