= Afghanistan Times =

English language newspaper in Afghanistan

The Afghanistan Times Daily
- Type: Print, online
- Owner: Rana Think Tanks
- Founded: 2005
- Political alignment: Independent
- Language: English
- Website: http://www.afghanistantimes.media/

The Afghanistan Times Daily is an independent, English language newspaper owned by Rana Think Tanks and published in Kabul, Afghanistan. Established in 2005, the 12-page newspaper contains articles focusing on local issues of political, social and cultural significance. The newspaper is published in both print and online formats.

== Staff ==
The Afghanistan Times Daily employs a chief editor, sub-editors, journalists, graphic designers and translators, all of whom are managed by an editorial board. Members of the editorial board include Dr. Sharif Fayez (Head of the Afghanistan Investment Support Agency (AISA), Dr. Omar Zakhilwal, Dr. Sultana Parwanta, Dr. Sharifa Sharif and Saduddin Shpoon (former producer of Afghanistan's Voice of America (VOA) radio programming).

The paper also has a management, finance and marketing department, whose work is guided by a board of directors. The board of directors are primarily responsible for overseeing financial and marketing issues, including the paper's advertising and subscription policies.

== Objectives ==
The Afghanistan Times Daily aims to provide members of the international community stationed in Kabul with an impartial perspective on issues within Afghanistan. Through providing an impartial perspective on local news stories, The Afghanistan Times Daily aims to strengthen peace, stability and democracy in the country. Afghanistan Times has also planned to launch a monthly magazine "Kabulscape" having two main objectives: To educate and entertain. The first issue of the magazine was release towards the end of May 2013.

== Financial difficulties ==
In its second year of publishing, The Afghanistan Times Daily faced financial difficulties and struggled to identify and implement a sustainable fundraising strategy which did not solely rely on donations. Although subscriptions and advertisements provided a major income stream, they were not enough to cover the costs of publishing the paper.

The Afghanistan Times Daily requested financial support from a range of sources to purchase new equipment, office tools and to engage provincial correspondents to cover regional news events. The paper identified a need for funds to hire new chief editors, sub-editors and journalists in the Afghan provinces of Herat, Kandahar, Ghazni, Bamian, Parwan, Kunduz, Jalalabad and Khost. However, the newspaper is independent and has no links with foreign embassies or donors to get financial assistance as it could easily cover its cost from advertisements. The newspaper struggled hard to come on top of the list of dailies in Afghanistan.
