= Australian companies in China =

This is a list of notable Australian companies operating in China, grouped by their Industry Classification Benchmark sector.

== Basic materials ==
=== Basic resources ===
- BlueScope (ASX: BSL), steel
- Fortescue (ASX: FMG), mining
- Orica (ASX: ORI), mining support
- Rio Tinto (ASX: RIO), mining
- Sino Gold, mining, main business is the mining of gold in China

=== Food and beverage ===
- Bulla Dairy Foods, dairy
- De Bortoli Wines, winery
- Elders, agriculture

=== Personal and household goods ===
- Billabong, clothing
- Cotton On, clothing
- Rip Curl, surf brand

== Consumer services ==
=== Retail ===
- Arnott's Biscuits
- Wesfarmers (ASX: WES), retailer conglomerate
- Woolworths (ASX: WOW), retail

=== Media ===
- Australian Broadcasting Corporation, radio and television broadcasting
- Nine Network, television broadcasting
- Seven Network, television broadcasting

== Financials ==
=== Banks ===
- ANZ Bank (ASX: ANZ)
- Commonwealth Bank (ASX: CBA)
- National Australia Bank (ASX: NAB)
- Westpac (ASX: WBC)

=== Financial services ===
- AMP (ASX: AMP), financial services

== Health care ==
- Cochlear, biotech
- CSL (ASX: CSL), biotech
- Ramsay Health Care, private hospitals
- Sigma Pharmaceuticals, pharmaceuticals

== Industrials ==
=== Construction and materials ===
- Atlas Arteria, roads and infrastructure
- Leighton Asia, infrastructure contractor
- Lendlease (ASX: LLC), infrastructure
- Woods Bagot, architecture consulting

=== Industrial goods and services ===
- Australia Post, postal service
- ResMed, medical equipment manufacturer
- Toll Group, freight and logistics company
- Worley, consulting

== Oil and gas ==
- BHP (ASX: BHP), oil
- Woodside Energy (ASX: WDS), petroleum exploration and production

== Telecommunications ==
- Telstra, telecommunications

== Travel and leisure ==
- Flight Centre, travel services
