= Renmin University of China, School of Business =

Business school in Beijing, China

Renmin Business School
- 人民商学院
- Motto: 实事求是
- Motto in English: Seeking truth from facts
- Type: Public University
- Established: 1950; 76 years ago
- Parent institution: Renmin University of China
- Accreditation: AACSB, EQUIS, CAMEA
- Location: Beijing, Haidian, China
- Language: Chinese, English
- Website: Official website

The Renmin Business School (RBS) (Chinese: 人民商学院; pinyin: Rénmín shāng xuéyuàn), is a Chinese public business school founded in 1950 in Beijing affiliated to Renmin University of China. Renmin Business school of China is considered one of the top 50 business schools globally by the Financial Times. The predecessor of the Renmin Business School was the Department of Factory Management, Trade, Bookkeeping, and Financial Credit. Renmin Business School is the founder of business administration education in China.

As of 2022, the school had 139 full-time faculty members, including 47 professors, 52 associate professors, and 40 assistant professors/lecturers. Close to 20% of the faculty were trained overseas with a doctoral degree. They are senior consultants or independent directors of boards of some of the largest companies in China. In recent years, RBS has strengthened its efforts in internationalization by significantly boosting its international programs.

== Ranking and accreditations ==
University rankings

Global – Business and economics
- Financial Times MBA: 39 (2018)
- QS Accounting: 89 (2021)
- QS Business: 110 (2021)
- QS Economics: 103 (2021)

In the 2022 evaluation by the Ministry of Education of the PRC, RBS was ranked number one for its excellence in Business administration. The school is among the few in China that has three nationally designated key research disciplines: general management, industrial economics, and accounting. RBS faculty won 19 nationals research grants in 2008.

== International collaborations ==
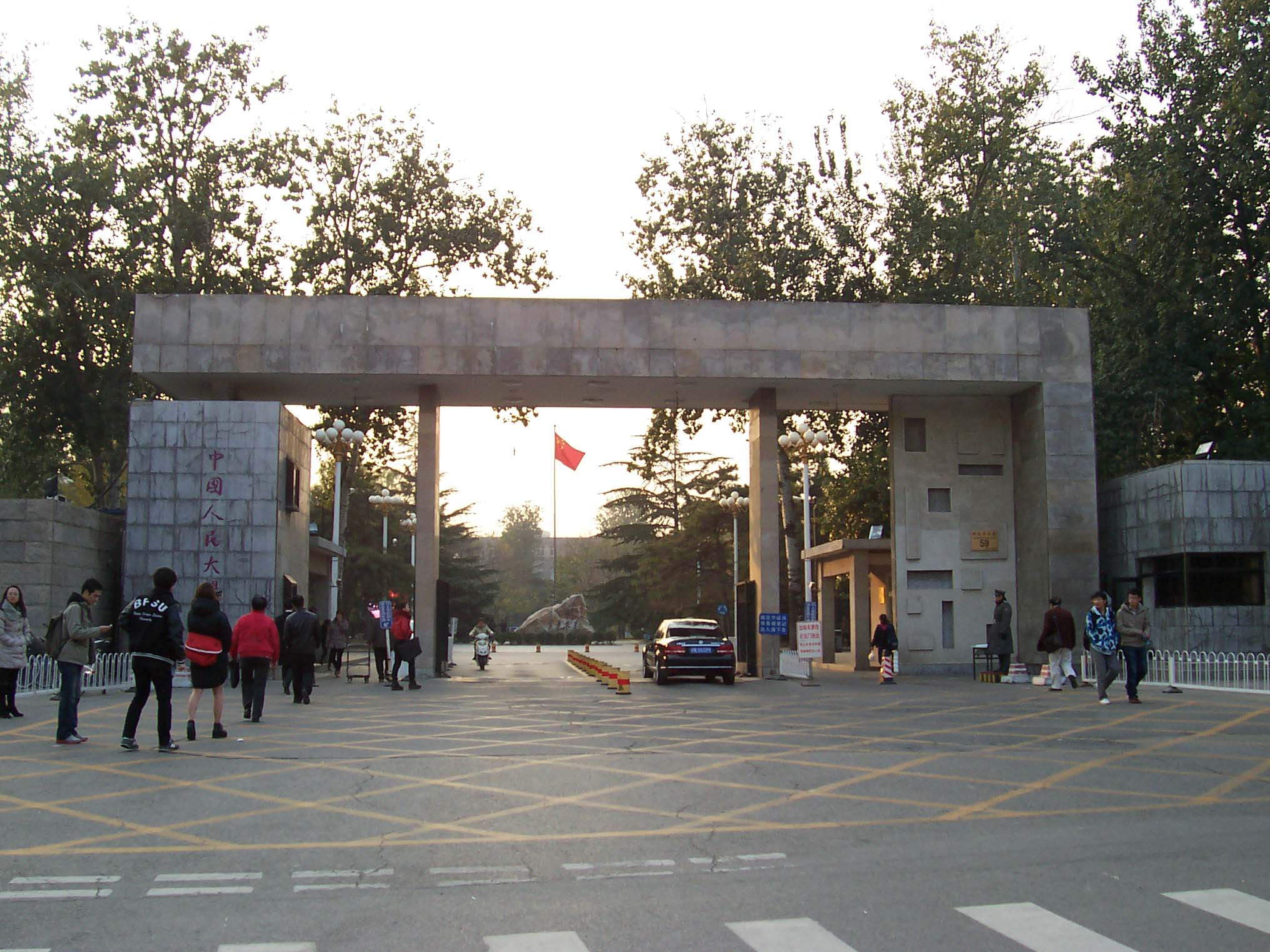
Entrance of the Renmin University of China

Renmin business school has established long-term and close personnel exchanges relations with more than 80 universities in the United States, Canada, the United Kingdom, Denmark, Ireland, Finland, France, Japan, South Korea, Australia, Belgium, the Netherlands, and other countries, as well as in Hong Kong and Taiwan.

Renmin Business School actively collaborates with its international partners to improve global management education. RBS is also one of the founding members of the Global Network for advanced management, along with the Yale school of management. In addition, the University has established partnerships such as student exchange and academic exchange with universities worldwide.

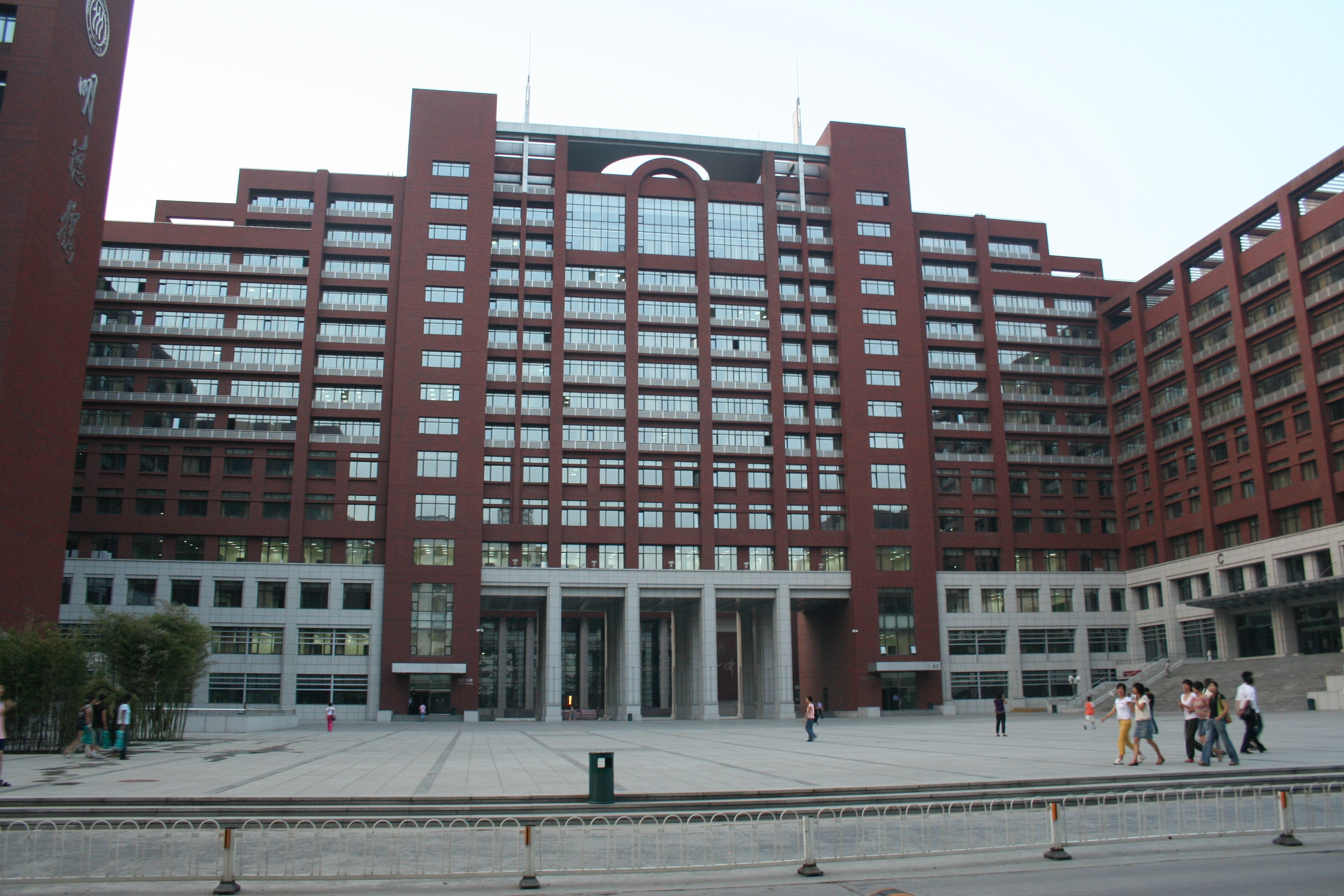
Renmin University of China Mingde Building

== International MBA (IMBA) Program ==
In 2009, RBS launched IMBA program. The IMBA program requires students to finish 47 credits, a practice report, and a thesis. Students who complete all requirements will be awarded an MBA degree by RUC.

The IMBA students from overseas and China take classes together. All the core courses are taught in English, and certain elective courses are taught in English or bilingually.
