= Embassy of China, Canberra =

Embassy of China in Australia

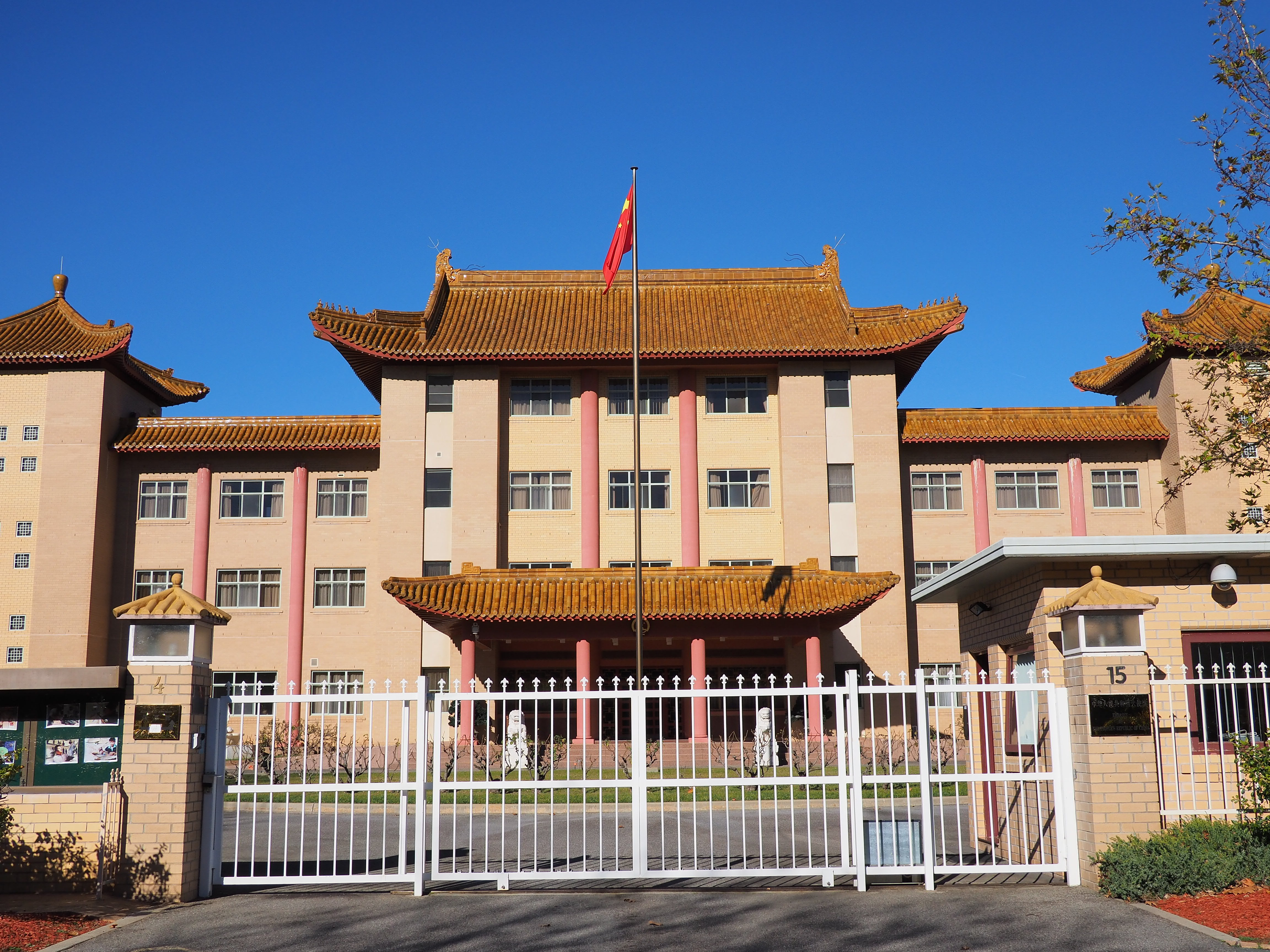
- Location: Yarralumla, Canberra
- Address: 15 Coronation Drive, Yarralumla ACT 2600, Australia
- Coordinates: 44.112°N 87.913°W
- Ambassador: Liu Jinsong
- Website: Official website

The Embassy of the People's Republic of China in the Commonwealth of Australia is the embassy of China in Canberra, Australia.

The Nationalist Chinese Embassy had existed in Canberra since sometime before 1951. After it was dismantled and staff departed Canberra in January 1973, the first Embassy of the People's Republic of China (hereafter known as the Chinese embassy) in Australia was established in 1973, with an advance party arriving in February of that year. The embassy had its official opening on 8 March 1973, with 14 staff arriving in May of that year. Wang Kuo-chuan, who was announced as ambassador on 16 March, arrived in Canberra on 9 May 1973. He was admitted to a Canberra hospital for an unstated illness in September 1973.

The embassy moved to a new building in 1990, which references ancient Chinese architecture. The building was designed by Guangzhou Architectural Design Institute and the Wulu Company, Hong Kong, and includes a main building, ambassador's residence, staff residence, swimming pool, and tennis court. Craftsmen were brought from Shanghai to build the roof, made with roof tiles imported from Yixing. There are extensive gardens, with an ornamental lake, pavilion, and rockeries. The new embassy, situated in the diplomatic estate of Yarralumla near Parliament House, was opened without fanfare on 10 August.

In 1995, The Sydney Morning Herald and ABC News revealed that, during the construction of the new building in the late 1980s, members of the Australian Security Intelligence Organisation and the American National Security Agency had covertly installed bugging devices in the building. Despite government attempts to stop the story being published using a D Notice, this proved ineffective and the story was published anyway.

As of 2013, a new embassy building was under construction, after the Chinese Government had secured an agreement with the Australian Government to have the building built by Chinese construction workers domiciled in China. Some controversy arose after it was revealed that China had negotiated a deal with the Australian Government to exempt building labourers from Australian workplace laws. Paul Daley wrote in his 2013 book about Canberra: "Beijing's growing presence in this highly symbolic part of the city seems an appropriate, if unwelcome, reflection of Australia's international diplomatic, defence and trade priorities".

In 2024, Tibetan and Uyghur activists protested outside the embassy when Chinese Foreign Minister Wang Yi visited Australia.

As of January 2025, the embassy remains in the 1990 building.
