= Zhengyou =

Chinese term meaning "critical friend"

Zhengyou (Chinese: 诤友; pinyin: zhèngyǒu) is a term sometimes used by several countries such as Australia and India to describe their diplomatic engagement with China. The phrase, meaning "critical friend" in Chinese, is meant to encompass building a broad-based relationship with an explicit and specific capability to discuss concerns about human rights. Proponents of zhengyou, such as former Australian Prime Minister Kevin Rudd, argue that it means criticism of China, such as for human rights abuses against migrant workers, is aimed at ultimately helping China rather than harming it. Indian diplomats have described zhengyou as "a serious, real friend who will frankly admit to problems and work at overcoming them".
