= Consulate General of Australia, Shanghai =

Consular representation of Australia in the People's Republic of China

Australian Consul-General in Shanghai
- Coat of Arms of Australia
- Incumbent; Dominic Trindade since 1 July 2019
- Style: His Excellency
- Appointer: Governor General of Australia
- Inaugural holder: Edward S. Little (Trade Commissioner); Roger Brown (Consul-General)
- Formation: 26 February 1921 (Trade Commission); 2 July 1984 (Consulate-General)
- Website: Australian Consulate-General Shanghai, China

The Australian Consulate-General in Shanghai represents the Commonwealth of Australia in Shanghai, the most populous city and a global financial centre in the People's Republic of China. The Consulate-General, one of many in Shanghai, has its offices in the CITIC Square building, 1168 Nanjing Road West.

The Australian Consulate-General in Shanghai reports to the Australian Embassy in Beijing, which reports to the Department of Foreign Affairs and Trade in Canberra, Australia, a process in line with the majority of Australia's consulates around the world. It was originally established as a Trade Commission in 1921, predating Australia's formal diplomatic presence in China by 20 years.

== Consulate history ==
=== Little Trade Commission ===
Originally established on 26 February 1921 with the appointment of Edward S. Little as Trade Commissioner of the Commonwealth Government in Shanghai, Little was the first Trade Commissioner ever appointed by the Australian Government, marking the beginning of the Australian Trade Commissioner Service first maintained by the Department of Trade and Customs. On his appointment it was noted by Prime Minister Billy Hughes that it was "the intention of the Federal Ministry at an early date to ask Parliament for authority to establish a service of trade commissioners which will be linked up with the Bureau of Commerce and Industry." Little toured the country before leaving for China in order to gauge the level of interest from Australian business circles in operating in China and noted that his posting would be the first direct representation of Australia in China: "They have been Represented in the post in Hongkong, but that is not really China."

However, on 26 July 1923, the Minister for Trade and Customs, Austin Chapman, announced that Little's posting was to be closed, with various concerns being raised about the expenses of maintaining the office in Shanghai. On the announcement The Age alleged that Little had abused his expenses as Trade Commissioner and noted that "It has now been decided to abolish the useless representation, from which producers and merchants in this country have derived no benefits whatever". The decision was met with significant outcry elsewhere however, particularly the Shanghai press, with Finance and Commerce lamenting that "The benefits of having a man on the spot to watch the trade interests of Australia should be obvious" and the North China Daily News decrying the decision as "regrettable and calculated to injure Australian prestige in the Far East." Little later published an article in The Bulletin noting what he saw as his wrongful dismissal and that the allegations surrounding his recall were completely unfounded.

=== Bowden Trade Commission ===
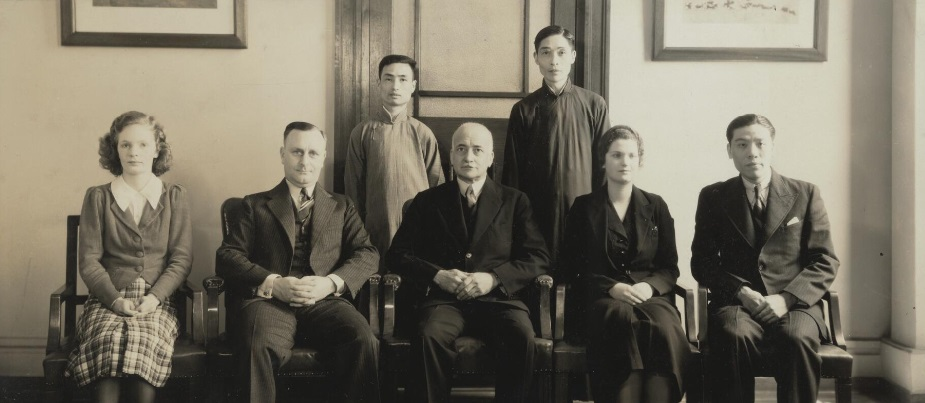
Australian Trade Commission staff, Shanghai, May 1937. Trade Commissioner V.G. Bowden in centre.

On 30 August 1933 the Minister for Commerce, Frederick Stewart, secured Cabinet approval for the establishment of several Trade Commissions in the East, with Shanghai, Batavia and Hong Kong being the most likely locations. However a decision to appoint a commissioner was delayed pending the report of Attorney General and Minister for External Affairs John Latham's fact-finding mission to the Far East, which found a dire need for Australian trade representative to improve mercantile connections in the region. While in Shanghai in April 1934, Latham met with representatives in the Shanghai International Settlement, including the British Chamber of Commerce and the China Association, as well as other Chinese and foreign business representatives, and was impressed by the interest in an expanded Australian business presence in the region.

Following Latham's return the Australian Government agreed to appoint a new Trade Commissioner, and the appointment of Vivian Gordon Bowden to Shanghai, alongside appointments to Tokyo and Batavia, was announced on 7 June 1935 by acting Prime Minister Earl Page. With the outbreak of the Second Sino-Japanese War in July 1937 and the Battle of Shanghai in August 1937, it was decided that Bowden remain in the city (the Trade Commission was located in the HSBC Building, within the relatively safe International Settlement) to keep the government informed on developments in the conflict and to work on "measures for the protection of Australian lives and property". Bowden served in Shanghai until September 1941 when he was appointed Official Representative of the Commonwealth Government in Singapore. It was also confirmed at the same time that Bowden would not be replaced in Shanghai, with all trade and commerce matters now the responsibility of the new Australian Legation in Chungking headed by Minister Sir Frederic Eggleston.

=== Wootten Trade Commission ===
With the end of the war, the Australian Department of Commerce and Agriculture decided to re-establish the Trade Commissioner Service, with Shanghai among the number of posts set to be reopened. In June 1946, Prime Minister Ben Chifley announced the appointment of Alfred Wootton as the new Trade Commissioner in Shanghai. Wootton, who had served under Bowden during his service in Shanghai and Singapore, however found a city much changed since the war, then in the midst of a collapsing economy and the central Nationalist Government crumbling in the face of strong opposition from the Chinese Communist Party. With the serious decline in Shanghai's importance for trade and the effects of the war upon trade prospects, the Trade Commission in Shanghai was closed in December 1948, not long before the victory of the Communists and the establishment of the People's Republic of China. However, the office's consular functions, undertaken by Osmond Charles Fuhrman as Consul-General since 5 July 1947, remained in operation after Wootten's and Fuhrman's departures in January 1949, with immigration officer F. R. Penhalluriack as Acting Consul-General until his recall to Australia in May 1949 (when Communist Party forces took control of Shanghai), when he was succeeded by Harold Loveday as Acting Consul-General. Colonel Alistair Clark, former Military Attaché in Nanking, relieved Loveday as Acting Consul-General in August 1950 and remained in the city until the final evacuation of the post in Shanghai on 8 September 1951.

=== Consulate-General ===
In February 1984, Foreign Minister Bill Hayden announced the establishment of an Australian Consulate-General in Shanghai while on an official visit to China, which was followed by the appointment of Roger Brown as the first Consul-General on 25 June. On 2 July 1984, Attorney General Gareth Evans officially opened the new consulate remarking that the new consulate was "a clear reflection of the remarkable growth that has taken place in relations in recent years".

== Office-holders ==
Name	Start of term	End of term	Notes
Edward Selby Little (Trade Commissioner)	26 February 1921	26 July 1923	
Office vacant
Vivian Gordon Bowden (Trade Commissioner)	7 June 1935	1 September 1941	
Office vacant
Alfred Wootton (Trade Commissioner)	4 June 1946	January 1949	
Osmond Charles Fuhrman	5 July 1947	January 1949	
Francis Penhalluriack (acting)	January 1949	May 1949	
Harold Loveday (acting)	16 May 1949	August 1950	
Colonel Alistair Clark (acting)	August 1950	8 September 1951	
Office vacant
Roger Brown	25 June 1984	1987	
Murray McLean	1987	December 1993	
Dr Richard Rigby	January 1994	10 October 1997	
David Ambrose	10 October 1997	18 August 2000	
Penny Richards	18 August 2000	5 September 2001	
Sam Gerovich	5 September 2001	11 October 2005	
Susan Dietz-Henderson	11 October 2005	30 May 2008	
Tom Connor	30 May 2008	28 September 2011	
Alice Cawte	28 September 2011	1 May 2015	
Graeme Meehan	1 May 2015	1 July 2019	
Dominic Trindade	1 July 2019	incumbent	

== See also ==
- Australia–China relations
