= Meridians Shanghai 2010: Art & Sound in Public Space =

Australian exhibition at Expo 2010

Meridians Shanghai 2010: Art & Sound in Public Space Project (Meridians) was an international collaboration between RMIT University (RMIT), Melbourne, Australia and East China Normal University (ECNU), Shanghai, China to create an installation of urban contemporary public artworks in Shanghai, China for the official Victorian Cultural Program towards Australia's contribution to Expo 2010 Shanghai China.

== Background ==
In 2008 ECNU invited RMIT to develop a collaborative public art project. In early 2009 the RMIT Design Research Institute - Intervention through Art's Seeding Grant Program provided funding for the original Australian project team to travel to Shanghai, China to develop the project concept.

=== Themes ===
The RMIT project team identified curatorial themes of ‘environmental sustainability’ and 'urban creative nature' for the project. These themes reflected the interests of the team's researchers and also corresponded to Expo 2010 Shanghai China's theme of 'Better City, Better Life'. Through the artistic exploration of the curatorial themes the project reinforced connections between public urban contemporary art and international collaborative practices between China and Australia in a university research context.

=== Title ===
The project was titled 'meridians’ because the word has multiple definitions that relate to points of connection in geography, astronomy, mathematics and Chinese medicine Selecting a title that emphasized points of connection actively reflected the project's interdisciplinary interests; international collaboration between geographic places; and connections between the project team.

== Role in Expo ==
Expo 2010 Shanghai China involved over 170 nations and ran from 1 May to 31 October 2010 and expected attendance by over 70 million people. The theme "Better City, Better Life" symbolised the common wish that better living standards will be available to all global citizens in years to come. On behalf of the Australian Government the Department of Foreign Affairs and Trade (DFAT) managed the Australia Pavilion. The Victorian State Government's participation included "Victoria Week" (17–23 May) a week of activities which promoted trade and investment in a range of Victorian industry sectors including Arts and Culture.

The Meridians project was selected as one of only two official satellite projects for the Government of Victoria (Australia)'s Cultural Program towards Australia's contribution to Expo 2010 Shanghai China.

== Project Team ==
The Meridians project team was made up of artists and researchers from RMIT and ECNU universities.

=== Australian Project Team ===
The Australian project team included RMIT artists and researchers: Geoff Hogg, Clare Leporati, Tammy Wong, Rupa Ramanathan, Robin Dick, Claire Tracey, Joanna Buckley and Greg Szopa. The lead Australian artist was RMIT Alumnus Cameron Robbins whose artworks are often based around interactions with nature to create self-guided drawings, which take on the form of the elements that have created them.

=== Chinese Project Team ===
The Chinese project team included ECNU artists and researchers: Zhou Chang Jiang, Wang Kai, Zhang Langsheng, Fanny Yu and Chen Xi. The lead Chinese artist was sculptor Wei Tienyu who was also the Chief Designer of The Riverside Landscaping Belt Sculpture Project at the Expo site.

== Artwork & research ==
The artwork was created and installed over five-weeks by the team of Australian and Chinese artists on the roof top and ground floor gallery space at the School of Art Building at ECNU.

On the roof top lead Australian artist, Cameron Robbins, explored natural energy by creating mechanical outdoor drawing devices that combined wind, paper, pen, pulleys, weathervanes and drawing arms to produce works on paper that were literally created by the weather. The resulting pen and ink 'wind drawings' were displayed in the exhibition space. Using discarded chairs and other found materials Cameron also created two light beacons, whose light was drawn from solar energy modules. Also on the roof Claire Tracey installed small sculptural works from cooking woks, mirrors and small motorised engines that moved to replicate the movement of the sky and literally reflected the sky on their mirrored surfaces.

In the exhibition space the artists responded to the curatorial themes of sustainability by creating artworks from discarded materials gathered from the surrounding environment including a wasp nest, glass jars, a wooden pallet and ceramic fragments. They also reconfigured multiples of everyday objects such as plastic cups, pegs, mouse traps, and chopsticks artistically reinterpreting their purposes and embedding them with wonder and imagination. The artists also created oversized representations of luxury bags and historical books that explored memory, identity and consumerism.

The RMIT researchers also embedded the project's development, themes, and artworks into their academic studies towards their Masters and PhD qualifications.

== Official launch & exhibition ==
The Meridians project was launched during Victoria Week on Tuesday, 18 May 2010 in Shanghai, at the East China Normal University’s School of Art.

The Hon. Jacinta Allan, Victorian Minister for Innovation, Industry and Regional Development officially opened the exhibition emphasising how it "draws on the creativity and talents of artists in Shanghai, and Victoria to explore the impact of urbanisation on our lives and fits with the Shanghai Expo’s theme ‘Better City, Better Life’".

== RMIT links ==
Meridians was a project of the RMIT Design Research Institute and supported by the School of Art, College of Design and Social Context, and Alumni & Development.

== External funding partners ==
The Meridians project was supported by the Commonwealth of Australia through the Australian International Cultural Council and the Australia-China Council, initiatives of the Department of Foreign Affairs and Trade.

Meridians was supported by the Government of Victoria (Australia) through the Department of Innovation, Industry and Regional Development (DIIRD), and Arts Victoria.

The project was also sponsored by Baddaginne Run Wines who provided Victorian produced wine for the official launch.

== Promotion and social networking ==
The Meridians project also explored the potential of interactions with social networking media. The project had an active profile on the social networking sites Facebook and Twitter and also created its own wiki as a creative portal at meridiansproject.ning.com to share the creative development of the project.
