= Ross Garnaut =

Australian economist

Professor Ross Garnaut AC
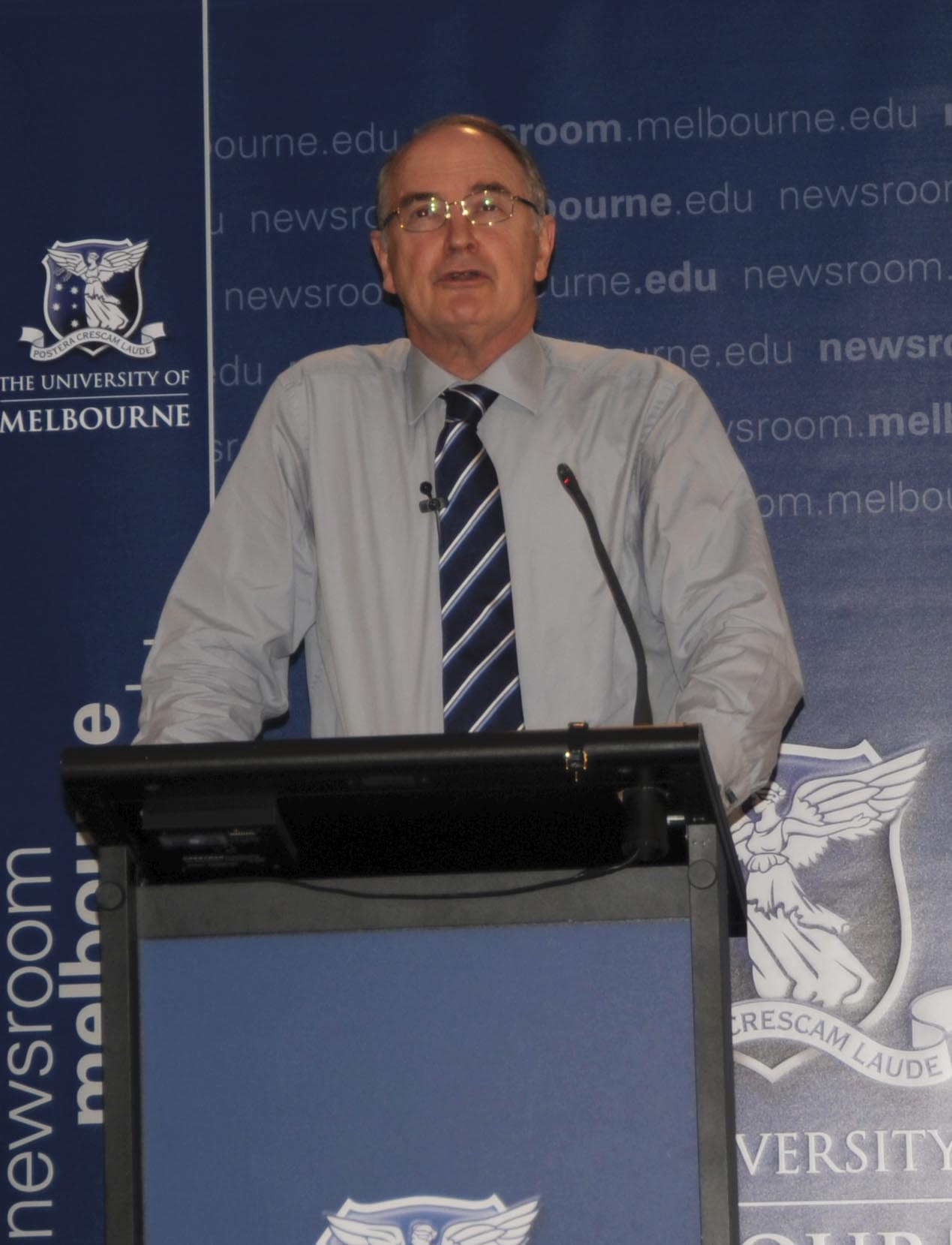

Australian Ambassador to China
- In office 1985–1988
- Prime Minister: Bob Hawke
- Preceded by: Dennis Argall
- Succeeded by: David Sadleir

Personal details
- Born: 28 July 1946 (age 80) Perth, Western Australia
- Spouse: Jayne Garnaut
- Children: 2
- Education: Perth Modern School
- Alma mater: Australian National University
- Known for: Garnaut Climate Change Review
- Occupations: Economist, academic, author
- Board member of: International Food Policy Research Institute (2003–2010); Lihir Gold (1995–2010); Primary Industry Bank of Australia (1989–1994); Bankwest (1988–1995)

Academic background
- Thesis: (1972)
- Influences: Peter Drysdale

Academic work
- Discipline: International economics
- Sub-discipline: Economics of East Asia and the Southwest Pacific
- Institutions: University of Melbourne

Ross Gregory Garnaut AC (born 28 July 1946, Perth) is an Australian economist, currently serving as a vice-chancellor's fellow and professorial fellow of economics at the University of Melbourne. He is the author of numerous academic publications on international economics, public finance and economic development, particularly in relation to East Asia and the Southwest Pacific.

Throughout his career Garnaut has served as senior economic adviser to Prime Minister Bob Hawke (1983–1985), Australia's ambassador to China (1985–1988), chairman of the Primary Industry Bank of Australia (1989–1994), chairman of Bankwest (1988–1995), head of division in the Papua New Guinea Department of Finance (1975–1976) and chairman of Lihir Gold (1995–2010).

On 30 April 2007 the state and territory governments of Australia, at the request of Kevin Rudd, then leader of the Australian Labor Party and Leader of the Opposition, appointed Garnaut to examine the impacts of climate change on the Australian economy and make relevant policy recommendations. The Garnaut Climate Change Review was finalised on 30 September 2008, with a finalised update being released on 31 May 2011. Garnaut concluded his role as climate change advisor for the Australian Government on 30 June 2011.

== Career ==
Garnaut attended Perth Modern School and then the Australian National University. He attained a Bachelor of Arts in 1967 and a PhD in 1972 as a student of Peter Drysdale.

He was previously distinguished Professor of Economics at the Australian National University (1989–2008), Head of Economics Department at ANU (1989–1998) and the Director of the ANU Asia Pacific School of Economics and Management. In 2008 he was appointed a Vice-Chancellor’s Fellow and a Professorial Fellow in the University of Melbourne’s Faculty of Economics and Commerce.

Garnaut was First Assistant Secretary (Head of the Division of General Financial and Economic Policy) in Papua New Guinea's Department of Finance in the years straddling the country's independence in 1975.

Garnaut served as Principal Economic Adviser to Prime Minister Bob Hawke from 1983 to 1985. During this period the government undertook a number of major economic reforms including floating the Australian dollar and introducing Medicare.

He served as Australian Ambassador to China from 1985 to 1988. He is the author of the 1989 report Australia and the Northeast Asian Ascendency. He was Deputy Chairman and Member of the Australia–China Council from 1990 to 1994 and a member of the Advisory Council to the Australian Minister for Foreign Affairs from 1997 to 2002.

Garnaut was chairman of Bankwest from 1988 to 1995 and chairman of the Primary Industry Bank of Australia from 1989 to 1994, when it was purchased by Rabobank. He was then chairman of Lihir Gold from 1995 until the company's merger with Newcrest in 2010.

Garnaut was the inaugural chairman of the Papua New Guinea Sustainable Development Program, serving from 2002 to 2012, but resigned after Prime Minister Peter O'Neill's government banned him from entering Papua New Guinea due to a dispute with BHP Billiton. He also resigned as chairman of Ok Tedi Mining due to this ban.

He was a trustee of the International Food Policy Research Institute from 2003 to 2010, including serving as chairman from 2006 to 2010.

== Contributions ==
=== Garnaut Climate Change Review ===
The Garnaut Climate Change Review was commissioned by former Prime Minister of Australia, Kevin Rudd, and by the Australia's state and territory governments on 30 April 2007. After his election on 24 November 2007 the Rudd, confirmed the participation of the Commonwealth Government in the review.

The final report was released on 30 September 2008 and recommended that Australia should indicate at an early date its preparedness to play its full, proportionate part in an effective global agreement that 'adds up' to either a 450 or a 550 emissions concentrations scenario, or to a corresponding point between.

Australia’s full part for 2020 in a 450 scenario would be a reduction of 25 per cent in emissions entitlements from 2000 levels. For 2050, reductions would be 90 per cent from 2000 levels (95 per cent per capita). Australia’s full part for 2020 in a 550 scenario would be a reduction in entitlements of 10 per cent from 2000 levels. For 2050, reductions would be 80 per cent from 2000 levels or 90 per cent per capita. If there is no comprehensive global agreement at Copenhagen in 2009, Australia, in the context of an agreement among developed countries only, should commit to reduce its emissions by 5 per cent (25 per cent per capita) from 2000 levels by 2020, or 13 per cent from the Kyoto compliance 2008–2012 period.

The report's recommendations in terms of policy, apart from a Carbon Pollution Reduction Scheme which included forestry and agriculture, centred heavily on hoping that carbon capture and storage and other coal pollution mitigation technologies would be available on a wide scale within the next twenty years.

The report was criticised by the Australian Chamber of Commerce & Industry for the economic impact that reducing greenhouse gas emissions would have. It was also heavily criticised by environmental organisations, including Friends of the Earth and Rising Tide Australia. The Australian Conservation Foundation praised the report for advocating a 450 ppm target. Clive Hamilton was heavily critical of the report, arguing that it reduced global expectations of what should be aimed for, naively exposed Australia's negotiating tactics to the international diplomatic sphere, alienates both the Australian public and the international community, misjudges the time frames necessary to avoid dangerous climate change, gives Australia numerous special deals, and would be rejected by the international community.

Responses from political parties were mixed. Australian Greens leader Bob Brown showed that the report demonstrated that reducing greenhouse gas emissions would not come at the expense of Australia's economic growth. Climate Change Minister Penny Wong did not comment directly on the report but said that economic responsibility needed to be considered in responding to the report, and that the Government would wait before Treasury modelling on climate change mitigation before responding.

In November 2010 the Minister for Climate Change and Energy Efficiency commissioned Professor Garnaut to update his 2008 Garnaut Climate Change Review. Eight papers were released in February and March 2011 and the final report of the Garnaut Climate Change Review Update 2011 was presented to the Government on 31 May 2011.

In September 2010, Professor Garnaut was appointed as an independent expert advisor to the Multi-Party Climate Change Committee. The committee will explore options for the implementation of a carbon price and will help to build consensus on how Australia will tackle the challenge of climate change.

=== Garnaut on nuclear power ===
In 2008, Garnaut was of the opinion that nuclear was not obviously necessary in Australia's low carbon energy future. He told the media: "Nuclear energy is an important part of the global response to a low-carbon economy, but under Australian circumstances, it is not obvious that nuclear is an important part of our answer."

His position on the matter was countered by Ziggy Switkowski, leader of the 2006 UMPNER Review, and an advocate for nuclear power in Australia.

Garnaut considers nuclear power to be a "low emissions" energy source, given its negligible emissions of carbon dioxide to the atmosphere during plant operation. He supports nuclear power as part of global efforts to reduce greenhouse gas emissions especially given rising energy consumption in Asia. He has also publicly noted China's commitment to expanding its fleet of nuclear reactors, even in the wake of the Fukushima disaster.

=== Garnaut on intensification of cyclonic events ===
Garnaut commented after Cyclone Yasi affected Queensland in 2011 that the extensive body of climate science suggested that "cyclonic events will be more intense in a hotter world". He further noted that if there were an intensification of extreme weather events with less than one degree of warming experienced and, if strong emissions growth was expected from many rapidly growing developing countries, then "you ain’t seen nothing yet" in terms of the intensification of extreme weather events. Recent studies by Australian scientists have detected a long-term shift towards wet extremes and hot extremes occurring at the same time, consistent with changes as a result of increased concentrations in greenhouse gases.

== Recognition ==
- Companion of the Order of Australia (AC) (2017).
- Fellow of the Academy of Social Sciences of Australia
- Honorary Professor, Chinese Academy of Social Sciences
- Distinguished Fellow, Economic Society of Australia
- Distinguished Life Member, Australian Agricultural and Resource Economics Society
- Doctor of Science in Economics, Honoris causa, University of Sydney (2013)
- Doctor of Letters, Honoris causa, Australian National University (2009)

== Personal life ==
Garnaut is married, with two sons.

== Books ==
- 2021 Reset: Restoring Australia after the Pandemic Recession. Black, Inc., Melbourne.
- 2019 Superpower: Australia's Low-Carbon Opportunity. La Trobe University Press, Melbourne.
- 2018 (edited with Ligang Song and Cai Fang) China’s 40 Years of Reform and Development: 1978–2018. Australian National University E-Press, Canberra
- 2015 (with Ligang Song, Cai Fang and Lauren Johnston (eds)), China’s Domestic Transformation in a Global Context. Australian National University E-Press, Canberra, co-published with the Social Sciences Academic Press (China).
- 2013 Dog days: Australia after the boom. Redback, Melbourne.
- 2011 The Garnaut Review 2011: Australia in the Global Response to Climate Change. Cambridge University Press, Melbourne.
- 2010 (with Jane Golley and Ligang Song (eds) China: The Next 20 Years of Reform and Development. ANU E Press, Canberra, co-published with the Social Sciences Academic Press (China).
- 2009 (with David Llewellyn-Smith), The Great Crash of 2008, Melbourne University Publishing, Melbourne.
- 2009 (with Ligang Song and Wing Thye Woo (eds), China’s New Place in a World in Crisis. Australian National University E-Press (Canberra), Brookings Institution Press (Washington) and Social Sciences Academic Press (China).
- 2008 The Garnaut Climate Change Review. Cambridge University Press.
- 2007 (with Ligang Song (eds)), China: Linking Markets for Growth. Asia Pacific Press, The Australian National University, Canberra
- 2006 (with Ligang Song (eds), The Turning Point in China’s Economic Development. Asia Pacific Press, The Australian National University, Canberra
- 2005 (with Ligang Song (eds), The China Boom and Its Discontents. Asia Pacific Press, The Australian National University, Canberra.
- 2005 (with Ligang Song, Stoyan Tenev, Yang Yao), China’s Ownership Transformation. International Finance Corporation, Washington DC.
- 2004 (with Ligang Song (eds.), China: Is Rapid Growth Sustainable? Asia Pacific Press, The Australian National University Press, Canberra.
- 2004 (with Ligang Song (eds.), China’s Third Economic Transformation. RoutledgeCurzon, London.
- 2003 (with Ligang Song, (eds.), China: New Engine of World Growth. Asia Pacific Press, The Australian National University Press, Canberra.
- 2003 (with Rana Ganguly and Jongsoon Kang), Report to the Department of Immigration and Multicultural and Indigenous Affairs, Migration to Australia and Comparisons with the United States: Who Benefits? Commonwealth of Australia, Canberra.
- 2003 (ed.) Pacific Economic Outlook 2003–04. Asia Pacific Press, The Australian National University, Canberra.
- 2002 (with Ligang Song, (eds.), China 2002, WTO Entry and World Recession. Asia Pacific Press, The Australian National University, Canberra.
- 2002 (ed) Resource Management in Asia Pacific Developing Countries. Asia Pacific Press, The Australian National University, Canberra.
- 2002 Review of Commonwealth-State Funding. Review of Commonwealth-State Funding, Victoria.
- 2002 (ed.) Pacific Economic Outlook 2002–03. Asia Pacific Press, The Australian National University, Canberra.
- 2001 Social Democracy in Australia’s Asian Future. Asia Pacific Press, The Australian National University and Institute of Southeast Asian Studies, Singapore.
- 2001 (with Ligang Song, Yang Yao and Xiaolu Wang) Private Enterprise in China. Asia Pacific Press, The Australian National University, Canberra, and China Centre for Economic Research, Peking University, Beijing.
- 2001 (with Huang Yiping (eds), Growth Without Miracles. Oxford University Press.
- 1999 (with Ligang Song (eds), China: Twenty Years of Reform. Asia Pacific Press, The Australian National University, Canberra.
- 1998 (with Ross H. McLeod (eds), East Asia in Crisis: from being a miracle to needing one?. Routledge, London and New York.
- 1996 Open Regionalism & Trade Liberalization: An Asia Pacific Contribution to the World Trade System. Institute of Southeast Asian Studies, Singapore.
- 1996 (with Guo Shutian and Ma Guonan (eds), The Third Revolution in the Chinese Countryside. Cambridge University Press.
- 1995 (with E. Grilli and J. Riedel (eds), Sustaining Export-Oriented Development. Cambridge University Press.
- 1994 (with Peter Drysdale (eds), Asia Pacific Regionalism: Readings in International Economic Relations. HarperEducation Publishers.
- 1994 Asian Market Economies: Challenges of a Changing International Environment. Institute of Southeast Asian Studies, Singapore.
- 1993 Structuring for Global Realities, Report of the Wool Industry Review Committee. Department of Primary Industries and Energy, Canberra.
- 1992 (with Ma Guonan), Grain in China. Australian Government Publishing Service, Canberra.
- 1992 (with Liu Guoguang (eds), Economic Reform and Internationalisation: China and the Pacific Region. Allen and Unwin, Sydney.
- 1989 Australia and the Northeast Asian Ascendancy. Australian Government Publishing Service, Canberra.
- 1987 (with Kym Anderson), Australian Protectionism: Extent, Causes and Effects. Allen and Unwin, Sydney.
- 1986 (with Christopher Findlay (eds), The Political Economy of Manufacturing Protection: Experiences of ASEAN and Australia. Allen and Unwin, Sydney.
- 1984 (with Paul Baxter), Exchange Rate and Macro-economic Policy in Independent Papua New Guinea. Australian National University, Pacific Research Monograph No.10.
- 1983 (with Anthony Clunies Ross), Taxation of Mineral Rents. Clarendon Press, Oxford.
- 1980 (ed) ASEAN in a Changing Pacific and World Economy, Australian National University Press, Canberra.
- 1980 (with P.T. McCawley, (eds), Indonesia: Dualism, Growth and Poverty. Australian National University, Research School of Pacific Studies, Canberra.
- 1979 (with C.G. Manning), Perubahan Sosial Ekonomi di Irian Jaya, Penerbit PT Gramedia, Jakarta.
- 1977 (with Michael Wright and Richard Curtain), Employment, Incomes and Migration in Papua New Guinea Towns. Institute of Applied Social and Economic Research (Monograph No.6), Port Moresby.
- 1974 (ed.) The Foreign Economic Relations of Papua New Guinea. Australian National University, New Guinea Research Unit Bulletin, No.56, Port Moresby and Canberra.
- 1974 (with C. Manning). Irian Jaya: The Transformation of a Melanesian Economy. Australian National University Press, Canberra.
- 1968 (with R.K. Wilson). A Survey of Village Industries in Papua New Guinea. The Australian National University, New Guinea Research Unit Bulletin No.35, Port Moresby and Canberra

Diplomatic posts
Preceded by Dennis Argall	Australian Ambassador to China; 1985–1988	Succeeded by David Sadleir
