= John Niland =

Australian academic (born 1940)

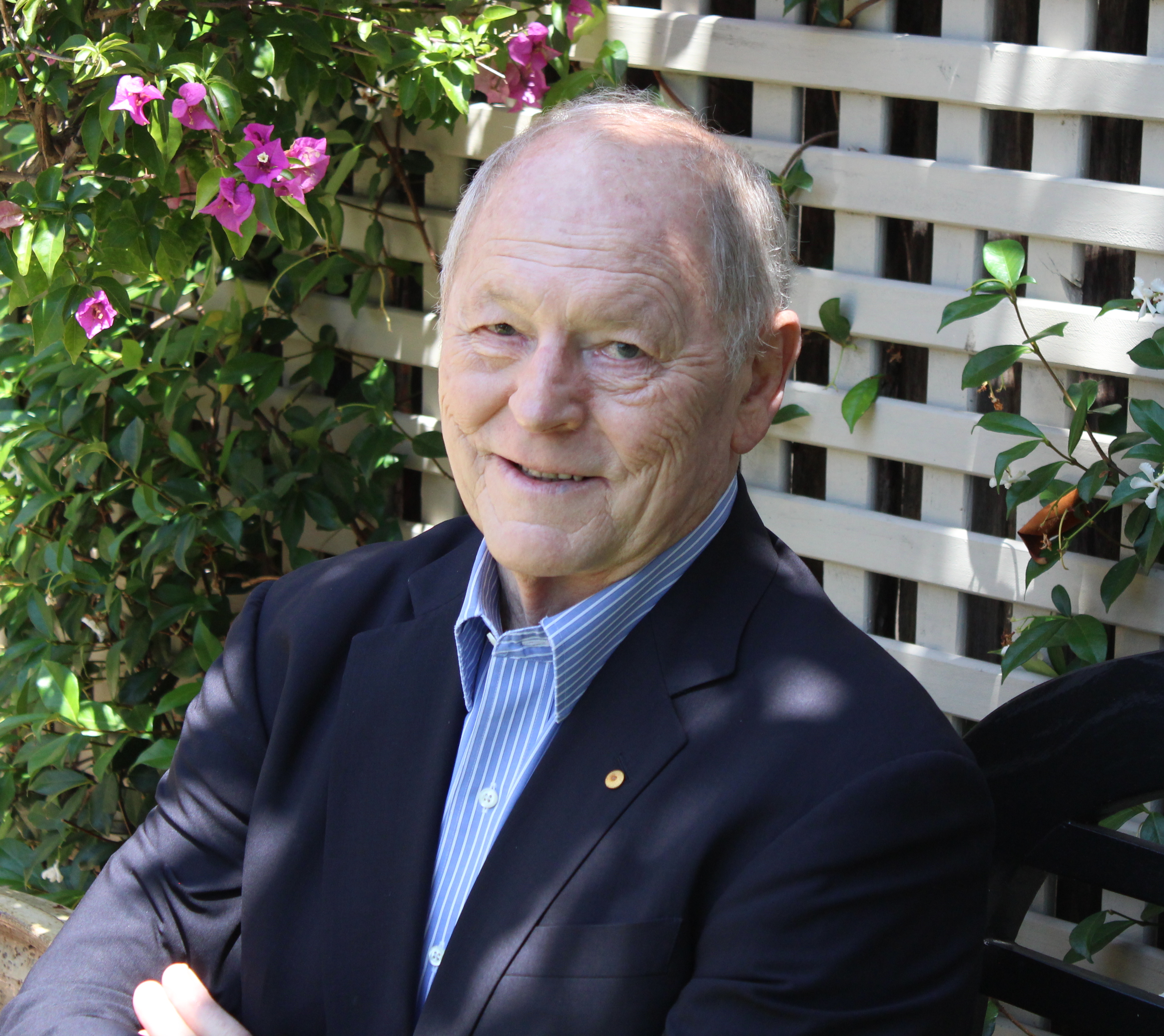
John Niland AC, professor emeritus, University New South Wales

John Rodney Niland AC (born 10 September 1940) is an Australian academic and board director. Niland obtained a Bachelor and Master of Commerce from UNSW and his PhD is from the University of Illinois. He has held academic positions at Cornell University, The Australian National University, and UNSW. He served as a mediator of labour disputes in the US while at Cornell, and in Australia has undertaken extensive academic and policy work in conflict resolution, theory and practice, particularly enterprise bargaining. John Niland is a professor emeritus of UNSW and was its fourth vice chancellor and president (1992–2002). Before that he was the dean of the Faculty of Commerce and Economics. While UNSW vice-chancellor, he was a founding director of both Universitas 21 and Australia's Group of Eight Universities. He also served a term as president of the Australian Vice-chancellors' Committee, and was a member of the Prime Minister's Science, Engineering and Innovation Council.

The University of New South Wales’s most recognised and architecturally renowned building, the Scientia, was officially renamed The John Niland Scientia Building for his long and distinguished history at the university. He is said to have led the university through a golden age which included significant internationalisation and campus revitalisation. In 2007 he received the President's Prize of the Royal Australian Institute of Architects for the UNSW campus redevelopment.

Until recently, he chaired the International Academic Review Panel of Singapore Management University, having been closely involved with SMU since its founding in 2000. In August 2018, SMU awarded Niland an honorary Doctor of Letters for services to the university. He continues to be consulted for strategic advice by university leaders in Asia and Australia

John Niland has held a range of other academic, community and corporate positions, including:

- Independent Director, Macquarie Bank Limited and Macquarie Group Limited
- President, National Trust of Australia (NSW)
- Chairman, realestate.com.au Limited
- Chairman, Campus Living Funds Management Limited (CLV)
- Chairman, Centennial Park & Moore Park Trust
- Member, University Grants Committee of Hong Kong
- Member, Australian Universities Council
- Chairman, Research Australia
- Deputy Chairman, Board of Trustees of Singapore Management University
- Chief Executive, State Pollution Control Commission
- Chairman, Environment Protection Authority (NSW)
- Member, Board of St Vincent's Hospital, Sydney; deputy chairman, the Garvin Institute of Medical Research
- Member, Board of Sydney Symphony Foundation
- Member, Sydney Olympic bid's Building Commission
- President, Federation of Australian University Staff Associations (FAUSA)

Niland became an Officer of the Order of Australia (AO) for services to industrial relations research and reform in 1992 and in 2001 became a Companion of the Order of Australia (AC), Australia's highest civilian honour, for services to education.

Selected Publications

1. “In Search of Shorter Hours: The 1861 and 1874 Iron Trades Disputes”, Journal of Labour History, May 1967, pp. 3–15.
2. “The Origins of the Movement for an Eight Hour Day in Australia”, The Australian Journal of Politics and History, April 1969, pp. 75–87.
3. “A Human Capital Model for Brain Drain of Foreign Manpower Trained in the US”, Journal of Economic Issues, September 1971, pp. 60–71.
4. “Allocation of PhD Manpower in the Academic Labor Market”, Industrial and Labor Relations Review, May 1972, pp. 141–156.
5. Collective Bargaining and Compulsory Arbitration in Australia, New South Wales University Press, Kensington, 1978, 180pp.
6. Control, Consensus or Chaos: Managers and Industrial Relations Reform (with D.E. Turner), Allen and Unwin, Sydney, 1985, 320pp.
7. “Process and Strategy in Industrial Relations Reform”, in R.J. Blandy and J.R. Niland (eds.) Alternatives to Arbitration, Allen and Unwin, Sydney, 1986, pp. 243–72.
8. Transforming Industrial Relations in New South Wales: (Vol 1, 1989, 270pp. and Vol 2, 1990, 213 pp), NSW Government Printer, Sydney, 1989, 270pp.
9. “The Light on the Horizon: Essentials of an Enterprise Focus”, in M. Easson and J. Shaw (eds.) Transforming Industrial Relations, Pluto Press, Sydney, 1990, pp. 182–207.
10. “The Appropriate Role of Property Rights in Environmental Protection”, Economic and Labour Relations Review, June 1991, pp. 122–53.
11. “The Fate of Australian Science – The Future of Australian Universities”, Australian and New Zealand Physicist, July/August 1998, Volume 35, Number 4, pp. 165–74.
12. Fit for Purpose: A Review of Governance and Management Structures at the University of Hong Kong, HKU, 2003, 52pp.
13. Integration Matters (Report of Working Party into Universities Amalgamation), University Grants Committee of Hong Kong, 2004, 67pp.
14. “The Challenge of Building World-Class Universities in the Asian Region”, Proceedings of the First International Conference on World-Class Universities, Shanghai Jiao Tong University, 2005, pp. 15–25.
15. “The NSW Green Paper Twenty Years On”, Economic and Labour Relations Review, Vol 18 No. 2, May 2008, pp. 15–22.
16. “The Asian Tiger University Effect”, in L.E. Weber and J.J. Duderstadt (eds), Preparing Universities for an Era of Change, Economica Press, Paris, 2014, pp. 249–268.
17. Times of Change and Deep Transformation, Paper to Presidential Session, ILERA World Congress, Seoul, Korea, August 2018, 16pp.

Academic offices
Preceded by John Nevile	Dean of the UNSW Faculty of Commerce and Economics; 1989 - 1992	Succeeded by Roger Layton
Preceded by Michael Birt	Vice Chancellor of UNSW; 1992–2002	Succeeded by Rory Hume
