= Mark Wainwright =

Australian chemical engineer and emeritus professor

- Born: 20 October 1943 (age 82); Adelaide
- Occupation: Honorary Visiting Professor
- Employer: University of New South Wales

Mark Sebastian Wainwright is an Australian chemical engineer and emeritus professor of the University of New South Wales, and institutional leader within the Australian academic and technological sectors. He served as seventh vice chancellor and president of the UNSW from 2004 to 2006. In 2007 he was awarded an honorary doctorate of science by the University of New South Wales. He was born 20 Oct.,1943.

== Education ==
Wainwright obtained BAppSc degrees in Applied Chemistry and in Applied Science from the University of Adelaide/South Australia Institute of Technology in 1966 and 1967, respectively. His postgraduate degrees include MAppSc in Chemical Engineering from the University of Adelaide in 1969, PhD in Chemical Engineering from McMaster University (Hamilton, Ontario, Canada) in 1974, and a DSc by research from the University of South Australia in 2003.

== Career ==
Wainwright began a teaching career as a tutor demonstrator while being a part-time graduate student at SAIT (1967–1969), and McMaster University. Once a doctor in 1974, he became a faculty member at the University of New South Wales, where he remained continuously until his retirement from the institution in 2006. His career at UNSW included successive positions as lecturer in industrial chemistry at the School of Chemical Technology (1977–1980), associate professor (1981–1988), professor/departmental head of chemical engineering (1989–1991), dean of the faculty of engineering (1991–2000), pro-vice-chancellor (1998–2000), deputy vice chancellor, vice chancellor, and president (2004–2006).

His research fields have included studies on applied catalysis, reaction engineering, mineral processing, adsorption processes in pollution abatement and gas and liquid chromatography. His research papers are often cited by reference books on organic reaction catalysis, solid catalysts, and heterogeneous catalysis.

As an institutional leader, he chaired of the National Computational Infrastructure Advisory Board from 2007 to 2015.

== Honours and recognition ==
In 2004 Wainwright was appointed a Member of the Order of Australia for services to chemical engineering as a researcher and academic, and to tertiary education. He was promoted to Officer of the Order of Australia in the 2026 King's Birthday Honours in recognition of his "distinguished service to the tertiary education administration, to academic research, to Australia–China relations, and to governance roles".

== Membership ==
Wainwright's activities in higher education span more than 40 years. Positions he held include:

- Chair, Australia–China Council (DFAT, 2006 – 2011)
- Director, Astronomy Australia Limited (2009–2012)
- Member and chair, National Institute for Experimental Arts Advisory Committee (2010–2014)
- Member of Convenor, Hong Kong Research Assessment Exercise (2011–2014)
- Founding Chairman, Foundation for Australian Studies in China (2010–2015)
- Member, ACOLA Working Group on Asian Literacy (2012–2015)
- Member, Hong Kong University Grants Committee (2011–2017)
- Chair, TAFE New South Wales Higher Education Governing Council (2009–2018)
- International Academic Review Panel, Singapore Management University (2014–2018)
- Chair, Sydney School of Entrepreneurship Board (2016–2019)
- Chair, Intersect Australia Limited (2008–2020)
- Member of International Advisory Board, Hong Kong Polytechnic University (2010–2019)
- Chair, Australian Genomic Cancer Medicine Centre Board (2018–2020)
- Independent Director, Australia's Academic and Research Network (AARNet) Pty Ltd Board (2010 – present)

== Works ==
Some of Wainwright's most cited scientific articles are:

- Jiang, C. J.; Trimm, D. L.; Wainwright, M. S.; Cant, N. W. (23 April 1993). "Kinetic mechanism for the reaction between methanol and water over a Cu-ZnO-Al2O3 catalyst". Applied Catalysis A: General. 97 (2): 145–158. doi:10.1016/0926-860X(93)80081-Z. ISSN 0926-860X.
- Jiang, C.J.; Trimm, D.L.; Wainwright, M.S.; Cant, N.W. (1993). "Kinetic study of steam reforming of methanol over copper-based catalysts". Applied Catalysis A: General. 93 (2). Elsevier BV: 245–255. doi:10.1016/0926-860x(93)85197-w. ISSN 0926-860X.
- Evans, J. W.; Wainwright, M. S.; Bridgewater, A. J.; Young, D. J. (15 July 1983). "On the determination of copper surface area by reaction with nitrous oxide". Applied Catalysis. 7 (1): 75–83. doi:10.1016/0166-9834(83)80239-5. ISSN 0166-9834.
- Wainwright, Mark S.; Foster, Neil R. (1 January 1979). "Catalysts, Kinetics and Reactor Design in Phthalic Anhydride Synthesis". Catalysis Reviews. 19 (2): 211–292. doi:10.1080/03602457908068056. ISSN 0161-4940.

== Awards ==
- 1987 - Royal Australian Chemical Institute Applied Research Award – Erich Heymann Medal, with D.L. Trimm and N.W. Cant for research into copper catalysts and catalytic processes based on copper
- 1989 – Royal Australian Chemical Institute R.K. Murphy Medal for applied research in reaction engineering and minerals processing
- 1995 – Fellowship from the National Institute of Resources and the Environment (NIRE) for Raney Copper-Zinc Methanol Synthesis Research – Japan
- 1996 - Murray Raney Award of the Organic Reaction Catalysis Society – for Research into Raney Catalysts – Atlanta
- 2000 – Awarded Centenary Medal for service to Australian society in research policy and management and engineering education
- 2004 - Awarded Member of the Order of Australia (AM) for service to chemical engineering as a researcher and academic, and to tertiary education
- 2004 – Awarded Doctor of Science (honouris causa) by the University of New South Wales
- 2010 - Honorific naming of UNSW Mark Wainwright Analytical Centre
- 2012 – Awarded an Honorary Doctorate of Chemical Engineering by Mahanakorn University of Technology, Thailand

Academic offices
Preceded by Rory Hume	Vice Chancellor of UNSW; 2004–2006	Succeeded by Fred Hilmer
