= William Macmahon Ball =

Australian academic and diplomat (1901–1986)

William Macmahon Ball AC
- Born: 29 August 1901; Casterton, Victoria
- Died: 26 December 1986 (aged 85)
- Education: University of Melbourne (BA)
- Occupations: Public servant, diplomat
- Spouses: Iris Shield (m. 1924; died 1926) Muriel Katrine Sandys Cliffe Anderson (m. 1928)

William Macmahon Ball, AC (29 August 1901 – 26 December 1986) was an Australian academic and diplomat.

== Life and career ==
Born in Casterton, Victoria, he was educated at Caulfield Grammar School and the University of Melbourne, where he received a Bachelor of Arts degree, Ball studied both psychology and political science as a research fellow at Melbourne and the London School of Economics respectively. He then travelled Europe as a Carnegie Travelling Fellow, and during the Munich crisis was the first foreigner allowed to visit Sachsenhausen concentration camp in several years.

He was a notable diplomat, working as an advisor to the Australian delegation at the San Francisco conference of the United Nations in 1945, Australian Minister to Japan, and British Commonwealth representative to the Allied Conference.

He later became a professor of political science at Melbourne University, and was a regular broadcaster on both the ABC and BBC. He was made a Companion of the Order of Australia in 1978 "for service to education and learning particularly in field of political science".

Ball was interviewed in 1971 by Hazel de Berg about his life and career. The recording can be found at the National Library of Australia.

== See also ==
- List of Caulfield Grammar School people

Diplomatic posts
Vacant Australian declaration of war on Japan Title last held by John Latham	Australian Minister to Japan; 1947	Succeeded by Patrick Shaw
