= Australia–China Council =

Former Australian Government organisation

- Abbreviation: ACC
- Successor: National Foundation for Australia–China Relations
- Established: 1978
- Dissolved: 2019
- Location: Canberra, Australia
- Chairman: Warwick Smith (last chair)

The Australia–China Council (ACC) was a long-standing institution in the Australia–China bilateral relationship, established by the Government of Australia in 1978 to promote mutual understanding and foster people-to-people relations between Australia and China. It was replaced in 2019 by the National Foundation for Australia–China Relations, which is part of DFAT.

== History ==
The concept of the Australia–China Council was borne out of discussions in 1975 between the first Australian Ambassador to China, Stephen FitzGerald, and Jocelyn Chey who was a counsellor at the Australian Embassy in Beijing and later became the first head of the council's secretariat. This led to the establishment of the Australia–China Council in 1978 by the Orders-In-Council.

When FitzGerald returned to Australia, he convened a working group which presented a report to Peacock recommending the establishment of an advisory body which would make recommendations to the Minister for Foreign Affairs on the ways to develop and strengthen relations with China and which, under ministerial supervision, administers funding to support programs which will advance the bilateral relationship. The council would have an independent board representing, on a rotating basis, all major sectors and stakeholder groups involved in Australia–China relations. The board would be supported by a small secretariat in the Department of Foreign Affairs and Trade. The model has proved to be highly successful and effective and was later replicated with other bilateral foundations, councils and institutes in DFAT. This structure has remained largely unchanged to this day. Initially, sixteen council members were appointed under the chairmanship of Professor Geoffrey Blainey, former chairman of the Australia Council.

In 2011 ACC established the Foundation for Australian Studies in China (FASIC), a partnership among government, business, and higher education sector, created to boost support for Australian Studies in China through the BHP Billiton Chair of Australian Studies, scholarships, and strategic projects. As of March 2025 FASIC is supported only by the National Foundation for Australia–China Relations (successor to ACC). It works with partners Western Sydney University's Australia–China Institute for Arts and Culture, and Australia–China Youth Dialogue.

In 2013 the Australia–China Council Board made a comprehensive submission to the "Australia in the Asian Century White Paper", which had been commissioned by Prime Minister Julia Gillard, outlining the board's views on directions of Australia's engagement with China.

On 30 May 2014 the Chair of the Australia–China Council, Warwick Smith, delivered a major address at the Australia in China's Century Conference in Melbourne. Smith spoke about the role of the Australia–China Council in the bilateral relationship and importance of institutions of 'soft power' in Australia's engagement with China and the Indo-Pacific region.

On the occasion of the ACC's fortieth anniversary in December 2018, it published a book Australia–China Council: the First Forty Years. At this time, it had spent A$23 million funding more than 2,600 projects.

In 2019, the ACC was decommissioned by the Morrison government and replaced by a new body, the National Foundation for Australia–China Relations. The final grants round of the ACC was for 2018–19. Warwick Smith was appointed chair of the new board, but resigned in August 2020, saying "Unlike the Australia–China Council, the advisory board [of the foundation] is not the governing board"; it exists in an advisory capacity only to the Foreign Minister. He said that the new body was "just an agency of DFAT" (Department of Foreign Affairs and Trade).

== Description and governance ==
ACC combined the cross-sectoral bilateral expertise and advisory capacity of an independent board appointed by the Minister for Foreign Affairs with the policy-making and management base in the Department of Foreign Affairs & Trade. The council made recommendations to the Government of Australia through the Minister for Foreign Affairs on strengthening the Australia–China relationship in ways that support Australia's foreign and trade policy interests.

The Australia–China Council provided informed advice to the Australian Government in relation to public diplomacy strategies and Australia–China economic, cultural and education engagement. It ran an outreach and advocacy program with the aim of promoting diversity, depth and strength of the bilateral relationship.

The council's strategic objectives for 2014–18 were:

1. To strengthen the foundations of engagement – China literacy, business and cultural capabilities of Australian institutions and people.
2. To seek and foster new areas of engagement between Australia and China across business, knowledge and creative sectors.
3. To enhance understanding in China of Australian society, economy, politics and culture through the Australian Studies in China Program.
4. To showcase Australian creativity, entrepreneurship and innovation in China.
5. To generate, disseminate and make accessible high‑quality, relevant and up-to-date information about Australia–China relations.
6. To facilitate dialogue, develop professional and institutional networks between Australia and China and harness the leadership of Australian communities in strengthening bilateral connectivity.

=== Former ACC chairs ===
- Warwick Smith: ?–2019
- Mark Wainwright: 2006–2011
- John Yu: 2000–2006
- Stuart Simson: 1997–2000
- Stuart Harris: 1991–1996
- Gough Whitlam: 1986–1991
- Wang Gungwu: 1983–1986
- Geoffrey Blainey: 1978–1983

== Activities ==
The Australia–China Council Board undertook regular official visits to China, focusing on engagement with the Australian Studies Centres network, Chinese Government, think-tanks, business, arts, media and education stakeholders.

=== Grants program ===
ACC aimed to kick-start a wide range of innovative, high‑impact projects across China, Hong Kong, Taiwan, Macau, and Australia that enhance Australia–China education, business and cultural connections. Its grant-making and program activities for 2014–2018 were centred on education, economic diplomacy, arts, and culture.

Its funding priorities were:

1. Education: Support practical and effective solutions to enhance China literacy, business and cultural capabilities of Australian institutions and people to effectively engage with China, and promote education, science and innovation connectivity between Australia and China.
2. Economic Diplomacy: Promote diversity, growth and innovation of Australia's trade and investment relationship with China.
3. Arts and Culture: Showcase Australian arts and creative industries to Chinese audiences and build closer and broader cultural and artistic partnerships.

Its "cross-cutting themes" were:

1. Mobility: Encouraging greater and more diverse professional mobility between Australia and China, including through support of the New Colombo Plan.
2. Capabilities: Building capabilities of organisations and individuals to enter into partnerships and work effectively with their Chinese counterparts; and investing in resources (including new digital and mobile platforms) that inform Australian communities and relevant sectors about opportunities, practices and risks in engaging with China.
3. # New Areas of Engagement: Identifying and seeking practical solutions to develop new niche areas of engagement between the two countries.

The ACC supported a number of initiatives, including the Australian Studies in China programme. ACC supported teaching and research on Australia in China for over two decades, providing funding and information support to a network of over 30 Australian Studies Centres across China. The Australian Studies Centres network was supported by the Australia–China Council, the Foundation for Australian Studies in China, the Australian Embassy and Consulates-General in China, and the broader Australian education and business community.

=== BHP Chair of Australian Studies at Peking University ===
The BHP Chair of Australian Studies was an initiative of the Australia–China Council, the Foundation for Australian Studies in China, BHP, and Peking University. The establishment of the chair was announced by the Prime Minister in April 2011 during the official visit to China. It was the first high-profile, privately funded Australian professorial position in China, and provided academic leadership to a network of more than 30 Australian studies centres in Chinese universities. David Walker was the inaugural BHP Billiton Chair of Australian Studies at Peking University, commencing in 2013. In 2016 political scientist Greg McCarthy became the new BHP Billiton Chair of Australian Studies at Peking University. McCarthy also held the Chair of Australian Politics at the University of Western Australia.
