= The Diplomat (magazine) =

News magazine covering the Asia-Pacific

- Cover of the September 2025 issue
- Type: Online
- Format: Magazine
- Owner: MHT Corporation
- Publisher: James Pach
- Editor: Shannon Tiezzi (Editor-in-Chief); Catherine Putz (Managing Editor); Sebastian Strangio (Southeast Asia Editor); Sudha Ramachandran (South Asia Editor); Ankit Panda (Editor-at-Large)
- Founded: 2001; 25 years ago
- Ceased publication: 2009 (print)
- Headquarters: Sydney, Australia (former); Tokyo, Japan (former); Washington, D.C., United States
- ISSN: 1446-697X
- Website: thediplomat.com

The Diplomat is an international online news magazine covering politics, society, and culture in the Indo-Pacific region. It is based in Washington, D.C.

It was originally an Australian bi-monthly print magazine, founded by Minh Bui Jones, David Llewellyn-Smith and Sung Lee in 2001, but due to financial reasons it was converted into an online magazine in 2009 and moved to Japan and later Washington, D.C. In 2020, The Diplomat reached a monthly unique visitor count of 2 million.

The magazine is owned by MHT Corporation (株式会社MHTコーポレーション) - a Japanese information services company that is based in Tokyo, Japan.

== History ==
The Diplomat was originally an Australian bi-monthly print magazine, founded by Minh Bui Jones, David Llewellyn-Smith and Sung Lee in 2001. The first edition was published in April 2002, with Bui Jones as the founding editor and Llewellyn-Smith the founding publisher.

The magazine was acquired by James Pach through his company Trans-Asia Inc. in December 2007. Pach assumed the role of executive publisher and hired former Penthouse editor Ian Gerrard to update its presentation. Nonetheless, the print edition suffered continued losses, and The Diplomat eventually went completely online in August 2009. Its Sydney office was closed and its headquarters were moved to Tokyo; Jason Miks was appointed editor in September 2009 and Ulara Nakagawa was appointed associate editor. Miks was succeeded as editor by Harry Kazianis before publisher James Pach took over. Shannon Tiezzi is editor-in-chief, with Catherine Putz as managing editor. Sebastian Strangio is Southeast Asia editor and Sudha Ramachandran is South Asia editor. Ankit Panda is editor-at-large and podcast host.

The Diplomat has published interviews with many public figures, including Ali Allawi, Anwar Ibrahim, Ian Macfarlane, Brent Scowcroft, Mike Moore, Jason Yuan, Kim Beazley, Wegger Christian Strømmen, Shankar Prasad Sharma, and Jaliya Wickramasuriya.

Prior to 2004, The Diplomat used to run advertisements emphasizing the magazine's Australian perspective by presenting the national flags of the United States, the UK, and Australia and logos of Time and The Economist with a headline "To which view do you subscribe?" Time magazine forced the cancellation of such advertisements.
