= Rory Hume =

Australian-born academic (born 1945)

Wyatt R. "Rory" Hume (born 4 January 1945) is an Australian-born academic.

Hume graduated from the University of Adelaide with bachelor's degrees in dentistry and dental surgery and a PhD in human physiology and pharmacology. Between 1980 and 2003, Hume's dental research demonstrated how to avoid adverse effects when applying restorative materials to dental tissue.

After service as dean of dentistry at the University of Sydney and then at the University of California Los Angeles (UCLA) he served as UCLA's Executive Vice-Chancellor between 1998 and 2002, and then as The University of New South Wales' sixth vice-chancellor and president from 2002 to 2004.

Hume's term as vice-chancellor at UNSW was marked by disagreements within the university council over allegations involving medical researcher Professor Bruce Hall, who was accused of serious scientific misconduct. Hume cited the reason for his departure as 'a breakdown of his relationship with the university Council'. Hume's handling of the Hall matter was subsequently vindicated by the independent St James Ethics Centre in a report described as 'highly critical of the UNSW council'.

Hume returned to the University of California system of ten research-intensive campuses and three National Laboratories in 2005 as Vice President for Health Affairs. In 2006 he became Provost and Executive Vice President for Academic and Health Affairs for the UC system, and then in 2007 also its Chief Operating Officer during the transition between Presidents Dynes and Yudof. He stepped down as Provost and retired from the UC system in September 2008.

From 2008 to 2012 Hume served as provost of the United Arab Emirates University. His time at UAE University did not yield the outcomes hoped for at the time of his appointment. While promising to transform the nation's first university into a dynamic research intensive one, Dr. Hume did not receive the financial backing from the UAE Government that would support such change. The UAE federal higher education system has been starved of funds in recent years. He decided not to renew his contract with UAE University when it expired in August, 2012.

Hume then served for two years and four months as the director, education, training and development for the research division of the Qatar Foundation. He resigned from that position for family reasons at the end of December 2014 and returned to California. He currently serves as dean of the University of Utah School of Dentistry, a position he assumed effective 15 May 2016. He is also a senior consultant for the Academy for Academic Leadership, AAL, based in Atlanta, Georgia, and is a faculty affiliate of the University of California Center for Studies in Higher Education.

Academic offices
Preceded by John Niland	Vice Chancellor of UNSW; 2002-2004	Succeeded by Mark Wainwright
