= Lihir Gold =

Gold mining company

Lihir Gold Limited was a gold mining company with operations in Papua New Guinea, Australia and West Africa.

The company, incorporated in Papua New Guinea in June 1995, and named Lihir as its first project was to raise capital to build the Lihir Island gold mine was merged with Newcrest at the end of August 2010 (last day for trading of Lihir Gold shares was August 30, 2010). Australian economist Ross Garnaut served as Lihir's chairman from 1995 to 2010.

Merger talks were first made known in April 2010, with an announcement by Newcrest. On August 23, 2010 the A$9.5 billion takeover offer by Newcrest was approved after 99.86% of Lihir Gold Shareholders voted in favour of it. The takeover received national court of Papua New Guinea approval on August 28, 2010.

The acquisition made Newcrest the world's fifth-largest gold producer with a production of 2.8 million ounces of gold (2009 combined production of the 2 companies).
