= John McCarthy (Australian diplomat) =

Australian diplomat

John McCarthy AO
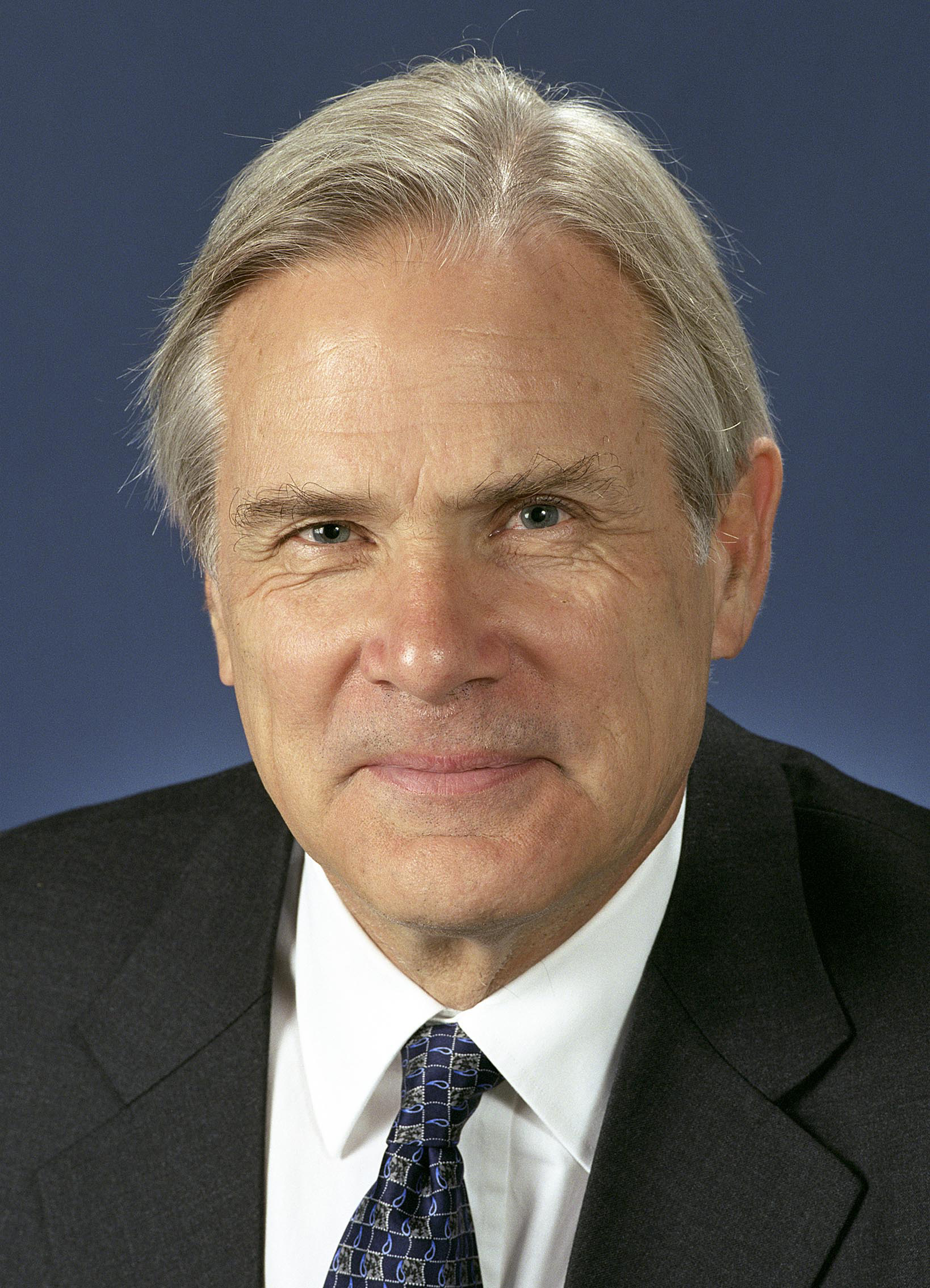
- McCarthy in 2013

Ambassador of Australia to Vietnam
- In office 1981 – 1983
- Prime Minister: Malcolm Fraser; Bob Hawke
- Preceded by: Philip Knight
- Succeeded by: Richard Broinowski

14th Ambassador of Australia to Japan
- In office 11 June 2001 – 15 July 2004
- Prime Minister: John Howard
- Preceded by: Peter Grey
- Succeeded by: Murray McLean

20th Ambassador of Australia to the United States
- In office 5 December 1995 – 1 February 1997
- Preceded by: Don Russell
- Succeeded by: Andrew Peacock

Personal details
- Born: John Philip McCarthy; 29 November 1942 (age 83) Washington, D.C., United States
- Children: Two daughters
- Parent(s): Edwin McCarthy and Marjorie Mary Graham
- Education: Jesus College, Cambridge
- Occupation: Diplomat, Lawyer, Barrister

John Philip McCarthy AO (born 29 November 1942) is a former Australian diplomat.

== Biography ==
Born in Washington, D.C., McCarthy was educated at Downside School, Somerset, in England and studied at Jesus College, Cambridge. He received a Master of Arts and a Bachelor of Laws degree from Cambridge University. He was a barrister-at-law and practised in London from 1965 to 1967. He worked with the New York City Law Firm of Shearman & Sterling from 1966 to 1967 and joined the Department of External Affairs in Canberra in 1968.

McCarthy was senior private secretary to the Australian Minister for Foreign Affairs, Andrew Peacock, between December 1978 and November 1980. Peacock later succeeded McCarthy as Australian Ambassador to the United States in 1997.

McCarthy served as Australia's representative in the following posts:

- Ambassador to Vietnam (1981–83)
- Ambassador to Mexico (1985–87)
- Ambassador to Thailand (1992–94)
- Ambassador to the United States (1995–1997)
- Ambassador to Indonesia (1997–2001)
- Ambassador to Japan (2001–2004)
- High Commissioner to India (2004–2009).

He also served in diplomatic posts in Damascus, Baghdad and Vientiane.

McCarthy was appointed an Officer of the Order for Australia (AO) in 1999 for service to the enhancement of Australia's international reputation and to the development of Australian regional policy while serving as Australia's Ambassador to Indonesia in Jakarta.

== Personal ==
McCarthy has two daughters with ex-wife Zorica McCarthy.

== Honours ==
- Officer of the Order of Australia (1999)
- Order of the Rising Sun, 2nd Class, Gold and Silver Star (2020)

Diplomatic posts
Preceded by John Starey	Australian Chargé d'affaires in Syria	Succeeded by Neil Truscott as Ambassador
Preceded by Philip Knight	Australian Ambassador to Vietnam; 1981 – 1983	Succeeded by Richard Broinowski
Preceded by Cavan Hogue	Australian Ambassador to Mexico; 1985 – 1987	Succeeded by Bill Farmer
Preceded by Richard Butler	Australian Ambassador to Thailand; 1992 – 1994	Succeeded by Cavan Hogue
Preceded by Don Russell	Australian Ambassador to the United States; 1995 – 1997	Succeeded by Andrew Peacock
Preceded by Allan Taylor	Australian Ambassador to Indonesia; 1997 – 2001	Succeeded by Ric Smith
Preceded by Peter Grey	Australian Ambassador to Japan; 2001 – 2004	Succeeded by Murray McLean
Preceded by Penny Wensley	Australian High Commissioner to India; 2004 – 2009	Succeeded by Peter Varghese
