= David Llewellyn-Smith =

Australian writer and independent publisher

David Llewellyn-Smith (born 16 March 1967) is an Australian writer and independent publisher in the field of macroeconomics.

== Early life and education ==
David Llewellyn-Smith was born in Sydney, Australia.

== Career ==
Llewellyn-Smith was the founding publisher of The Diplomat, an Australian international business and politics magazine, in 2000, and was its publisher and later Editor-in-Chief for eight years. The magazine published special issues "Global 100", "FDI 100" and "SMEGlobal100" in conjunction with Ibisworld. The magazine was sold in 2007 and it now operates online as an international relations website for the Asian region.

In 2009, Llewellyn-Smith co-authored The Great Crash of 2008 with Australian economist Ross Garnaut. The book was published by Melbourne University Press. The authors attribute the 2008 financial crisis to four factors: global imbalances; global housing bubbles, the emergence of "clever money" and increasing greed.

Also in 2009, Llewellyn-Smith created "The Distillery", a five-day-per-week morning column in the Business Spectator. The column critiqued business commentators in major newspapers and remains in circulation in 2014.

In 2010, Llewellyn-Smith contributed to foundation of MacroBusiness, an Australian economics and markets blog. And in 2012 he founded Macro Investor, an independent investment newsletter.

Llewellyn-Smith's articles on economics and political economy have been published in The Sydney Morning Herald, The Age and the ABC's The Drum. He is frequently quoted in news reports on economic topics.

== Criticism ==
In 2022, in response to a proposed security deal between the Solomon Islands and China, Llewellyn-Smith called for Australia to invade the islands and "engineer regime change in Honiara". In response, South China Morning Post's Alex Lo stated in an opinion piece that Llewellyn-Smith's position was "irrational", and that it "would have been funny if the piece was written by just another extreme right-wing head case".

== Notes and references ==
- "Calling the boom's end", Australasian Business Intelligence, COMTEX News Network, Inc, 30 August 2012, ISSN 1320-6680
