= Dennis Argall =

Australian diplomat (1943–2023)

Australian Ambassador to China
- In office 1984–1985
- Preceded by: Hugh Alexander Dunn
- Succeeded by: Ross Garnaut

Personal details
- Born: 7 July 1943 Newcastle, New South Wales, Australia
- Died: 13 June 2023 (aged 79) Nowra, New South Wales, Australia
- Education: Newington College; University of Sydney
- Occupation: Senior career officer with Department of Foreign Affairs & Trade
- Profession: Diplomat

Dennis Walter Argall (7 July 1943 – 13 June 2023) was an Australian diplomat and senior career officer with the Department of Foreign Affairs & Trade. He was Australia’s Ambassador to China from 1984 until 1985. A tribute in John Menadue's, public commentator, and formerly a senior public servant and diplomat, journal of public policy, Pearls and Irritations described him as "curious, funny, fiercely intelligent, committed to social justice, and fairly often the world had to catch up with him. He didn’t laugh at sexist and racist jokes, he didn’t find them funny. He was a career diplomat, a former Ambassador to China, and he wrote the first speech in the Australian Parliament that talked about human rights."

== Biography ==
Argall was born in Newcastle, New South Wales. His father worked for the Commonwealth Bank and he grew up in Newcastle, Sydney, and Maryborough before returning to Sydney. He attended Newington College (1955–1959) on a scholarship and completed a Bachelor of Arts degree with honours in anthropology at the University of Sydney.

Argall died in Nowra on 13 June 2023, at the age of 79.

== Career ==
Argall joined the Department of External Affairs (which later became the Department of Foreign Affairs) in January 1964. He was posted to Manila (1965–1967), Rome (1968–1969), and Washington DC (1976–1978) where he was Counsellor, later acting Minister. From 1972 to 1974 he worked in a policy area of the Department of Defence and then as Assistant Secretary in the Department of the Special Minister of State.

In 1978 and 1979, he was senior advisor to Lionel Bowen deputy leader of the Australian Labor Party in the Australian Parliament, before returning to Foreign Affairs as Assistant Secretary North Asia. Argall was later acting head of the North and South Asia Division in 1982 and 1983. Argall was Ambassador to China in 1984–1985. Illness shortened Argall's appointment in Beijing. He completed a master's degree in defence studies at the University of New South Wales College in the Australian Defence Force Academy in 1988, with a minor thesis analysing decisions made by the Australian cabinet about the relationship with China in 1980. Though returning to work for a time as head of research in the Commonwealth Parliamentary Library, Argall's health deteriorated again, much later diagnosed as Chronic Fatigue Syndrome and fibromyalgia, factors preventing return to regular work.

In 2003 and 2004, Argall gave speeches critical of the Australian Government's entry into war with Iraq comparing events with the beginnings of World War 1 and expecting comparable unravelling of violence.

Argall subsequently sought to assist communities in Africa with developing practical business plans for development. In 2008, he ran for mayor of the City of Shoalhaven.

His papers, from the period 1984 until 1988, are held by the National Library of Australia. These include writing on the 1980 Cabinet decision that gave direction to Australia's modern relationship with China and the complex of issues at the end of 1975, during turbulent last days of the Whitlam Government concerning the 'Korean Question' at the United Nations and the sudden departure of all of the staff of the embassy of the DPRK from Canberra.
