= Australia–North Korea relations =

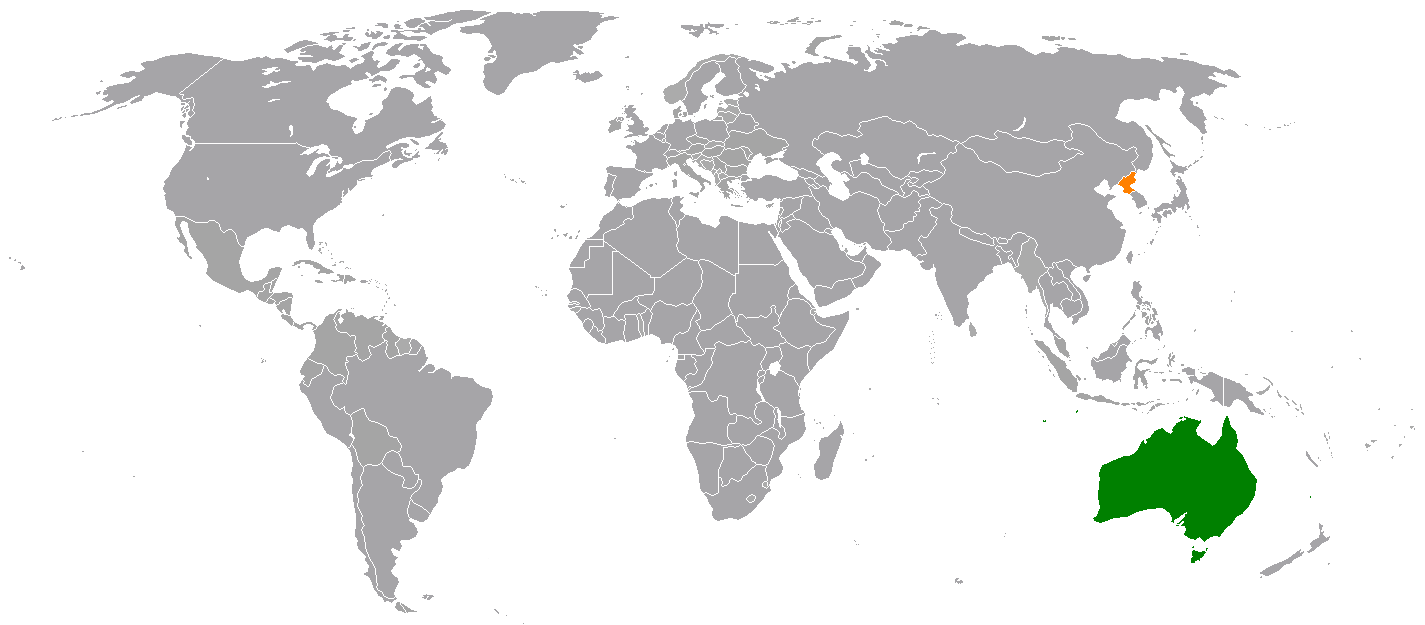

- Australia: North Korea

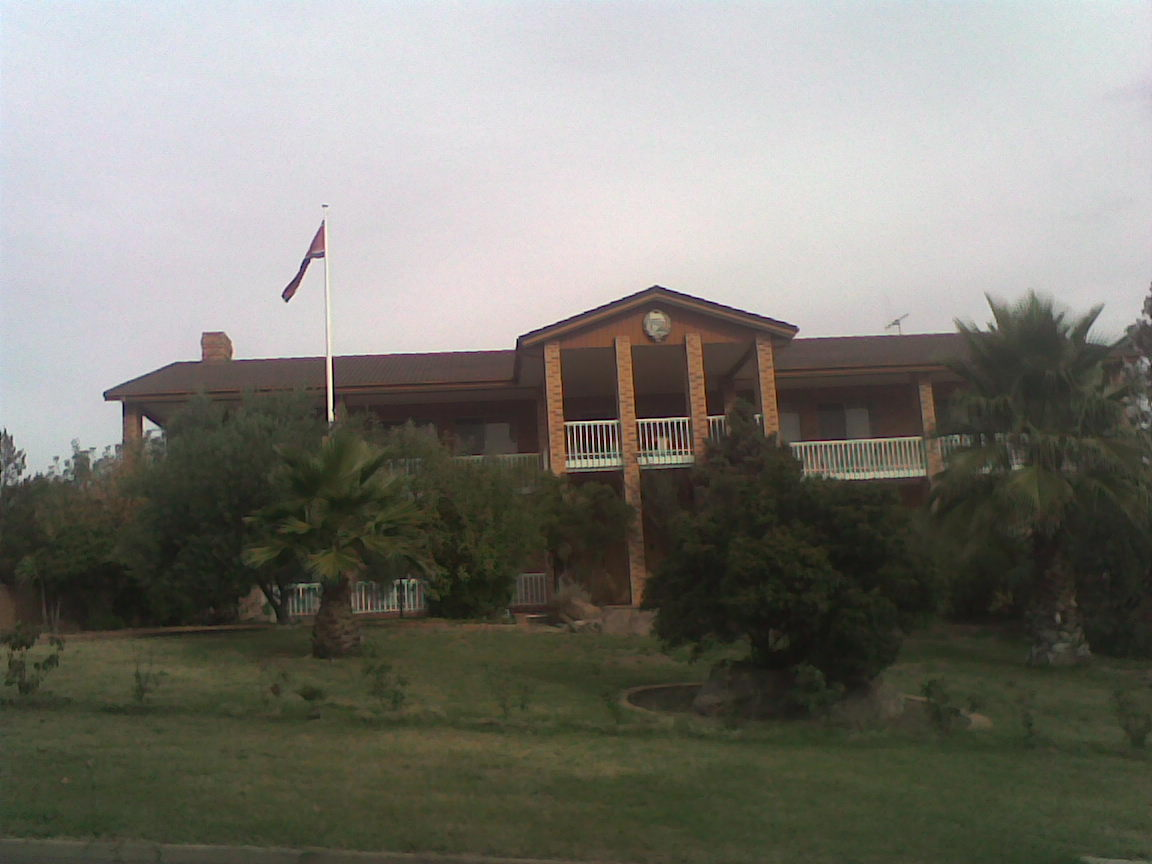
The North Korean embassy in Canberra, Australia, in 2007

Australia–North Korea relations (Korean: 오스트랄리아-조선민주주의인민공화국 관계) refers to the existing bilateral relationship between Australia and North Korea. Relations were officially established on 31 July 1974 when Australia extended diplomatic recognition to North Korea under the Whitlam government. Overall, relations have been stressed and at times, tense, due to Australia's historical involvement in the Korean War and military alliance with the United States, and contemporary disputes such as North Korea's nuclear weapons program and accusations of human rights abuses by both sides.

There have been several brief periods of direct diplomatic engagement, most notably during the 1970s and the 1990s and early 2000s. As of 2023, neither Australia nor North Korea have an official diplomatic presence in either country. Instead, diplomatic relations between the two are handled by non-resident embassies. Since 2008, the Australian embassy in Seoul has managed relations with North Korea, while the DPRK embassy in Jakarta, Indonesia, has been responsible for relations with Australia. Additionally, the Swedish embassy in Pyongyang provides limited assistance to Australians.

According to a 2013 BBC World Service Poll, only 7% of Australians view North Korea's influence positively, with 85% expressing a negative view.

== History ==
Monthly value of Australian merchandise exports to North Korea (A$ millions) since 1988

Monthly value of North Korean merchandise exports to Australia (A$ millions) since 1988

The first diplomatic exchange between Australia and North Korea occurred when a North Korean delegation visited Melbourne in 1973. Then Whitlam government Minister for Overseas Trade Dr Jim Cairns later visited Pyongyang to discuss the potential opening of a North Korean trade office in Australia.

After establishing diplomatic relations in July 1974, North Korea opened an embassy in Canberra in December 1974. Australian Foreign Minister Don Willesee and North Korean Foreign Minister Ho Dam exchanged diplomatic visits in 1975. However, North Korea abruptly closed its embassy without warning later in October 1975 citing restrictions placed on its diplomats.

Australia and North Korea re-established contact in January 1989 amid the changing geopolitical environment caused by the end of the Cold War. However, relations failed to gain traction due to the 1994 North Korean nuclear crisis.

Australia and North Korea normalised diplomatic relations in May 2000 and Australia accredited its embassy in China to North Korea after an Australian delegation visited Pyongyang in 1999. The foreign ministers on both sides exchanged diplomatic visits, with Howard government Foreign Minister Alexander Downer stating Australia's intent to "bring North Korea in from isolation". A modest trade relationship ensued, totalling $48 million. North Korea also opened an embassy in Canberra in 2002 and preparations were in place for Australia to open an embassy in Pyongyang. However, relations became stressed again due to North Korea's admission of possessing a clandestine nuclear weapons program in 2002 and its subsequent withdrawal from the Treaty on the Non-Proliferation of Nuclear Weapons in 2003.

Also in 2003, in an event called The Pong Su incident, the North Korean ship Pong Su was discovered in Australian waters while its crew members were smuggling heroin. The ship attempted an escape and was taken over by the Australian commandos after a four-day chase.

Australia implemented autonomous and multilateral sanctions on North Korea in response to the 2006 North Korean nuclear test. Autonomous sanctions included a ban on the freedom of movement of North Korean diplomatic staff outside of the Australian Capital Territory, the refusal to grant North Korean citizens visas, and financial sanctions on all currency transactions between Australia and North Korea. Meanwhile, the implementation of multilateral sanctions banned Australian exporters from supplying North Korea with most essential goods, effectively ending the modest economic relationship.

In January 2008, North Korea closed its embassy in Canberra citing financial constraints. In January 2013, North Korea requested permission to reopen its embassy, despite Australia supporting increased international sanctions against the country due to its continued nuclear regime. Australia rejected the request in June 2013, despite encouragement from the Obama administration for Australia to engage North Korea diplomatically.

The Australian Ambassador to South Korea William Paterson took an official four-day trip in June 2016 to North Korea, which included meetings with government officials in Pyongyang as well as travelling outside the capital to inspect Australian aid-funded projects.

In April 2017, in response to Australia's vocal condemnation of its nuclear weapons program, North Korea threatened Australia with a nuclear strike. Relations plummeted further when Australian Prime Minister Malcolm Turnbull threatened to invoke ANZUS amid escalating nuclear rhetoric between North Korea and the United States during the 2017–2018 North Korea crisis.

The Australian Defence Force has periodically deployed warships and aircraft to North Asia since 2018 as part of international efforts to enforce sanctions against North Korea. This deployment is designated Operation Argos.

In September 2021, North Korea denounced the signing of AUKUS as "extremely undesirable and dangerous" warning that it could "upset the strategic balance in the Asia-Pacific" and "trigger a nuclear arms race".

== Former Australian embassy ==
The Australian Embassy in Pyongyang opened on 30 April 1975 by John Watson, Resident Charge. Watson had a staff of about six, with some local employees. Stephen FitzGerald, who was resident Ambassador to China, was accredited Ambassador to North Korea. He presented his credentials to North Korea's vice president on 30 May 1975.

The embassy was closed on 8 November 1975 following inter-governmental problems and Australian staff were withdrawn. Australia did not withdraw the accreditation of its non-resident Ambassador to North Korea, but did not renew the accreditation when it changed ambassadors to China. Talks on re-establishing diplomatic ties between the two countries were had in 1979, and again in 1990, but relations were not resumed until May 2000, and the Embassy in Seoul has been accredited to North Korea since August 2008.
