= Jan Adams (diplomat) =

Australian diplomat

Jan Adams AO PSM
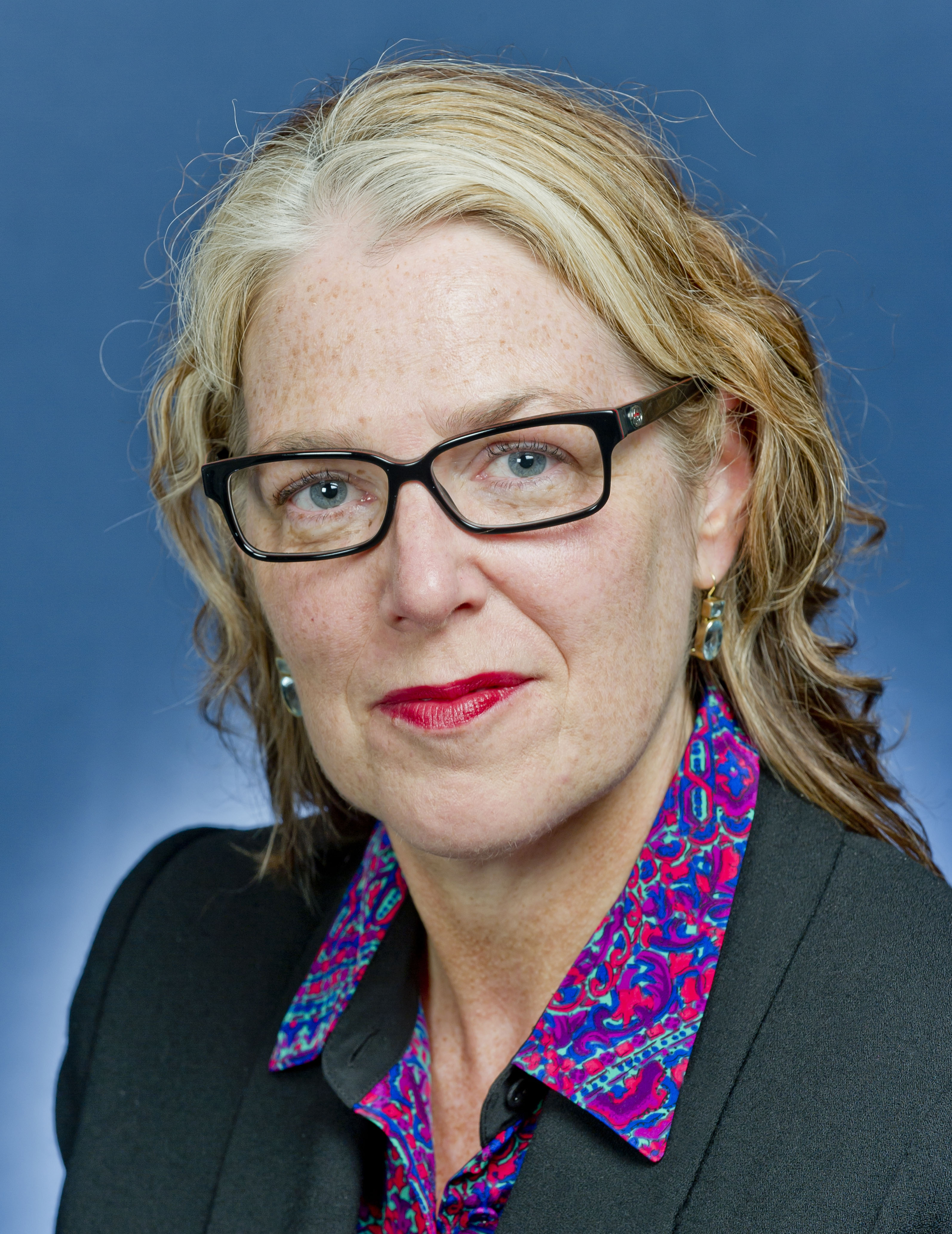

Secretary of the Department of Foreign Affairs and Trade
- Incumbent
- Assumed office 1 July 2022
- Preceded by: Kathryn Campbell

Australian Ambassador to Japan
- In office October 2020 – July 2022
- Preceded by: Richard Court

Australian Ambassador to China
- In office February 2016 – August 2019
- Preceded by: Frances Adamson
- Succeeded by: Graham Fletcher

Personal details
- Born: 1963 (age 62–63)
- Children: One son
- Education: Monash University; BEc (Hons), LLB (Hons)
- Occupation: Public servant, diplomat

Jan Elizabeth Adams AO PSM (born 1963) is a senior Australian public servant who has served as the Secretary of the Department of Foreign Affairs and Trade since July 2022. Adams is also a former Australian diplomat who served as the Australian Ambassador to Japan since October 2020. She was previously the Australian Ambassador to China from February 2016 to August 2019.

== Early life and education ==
Adams, born in 1963, grew up in Wodonga, Victoria. She studied economics and law at Monash University in Melbourne. She completed her economics studies in 1986 with a Bachelor of Economics (honours). In 1988 she worked at the Trade Directorate of the OECD in Paris, before returning to Monash University to complete her law studies in 1992 with a Bachelor of Laws (honours). Her law honours thesis was on the topic "Applying the General Agreement on Tariffs and Trade to Environmental Law and Policy".

During her undergraduate studies, Adams focused on the governance of international trade. She worked as a research assistant to Professor Richard H. Snape in the Department of Economics at Monash University, particularly on the study Regional Trade Agreements: Implications and Options for Australia, which was published in 1993 by the Department of Foreign Affairs and Trade.

== Career ==
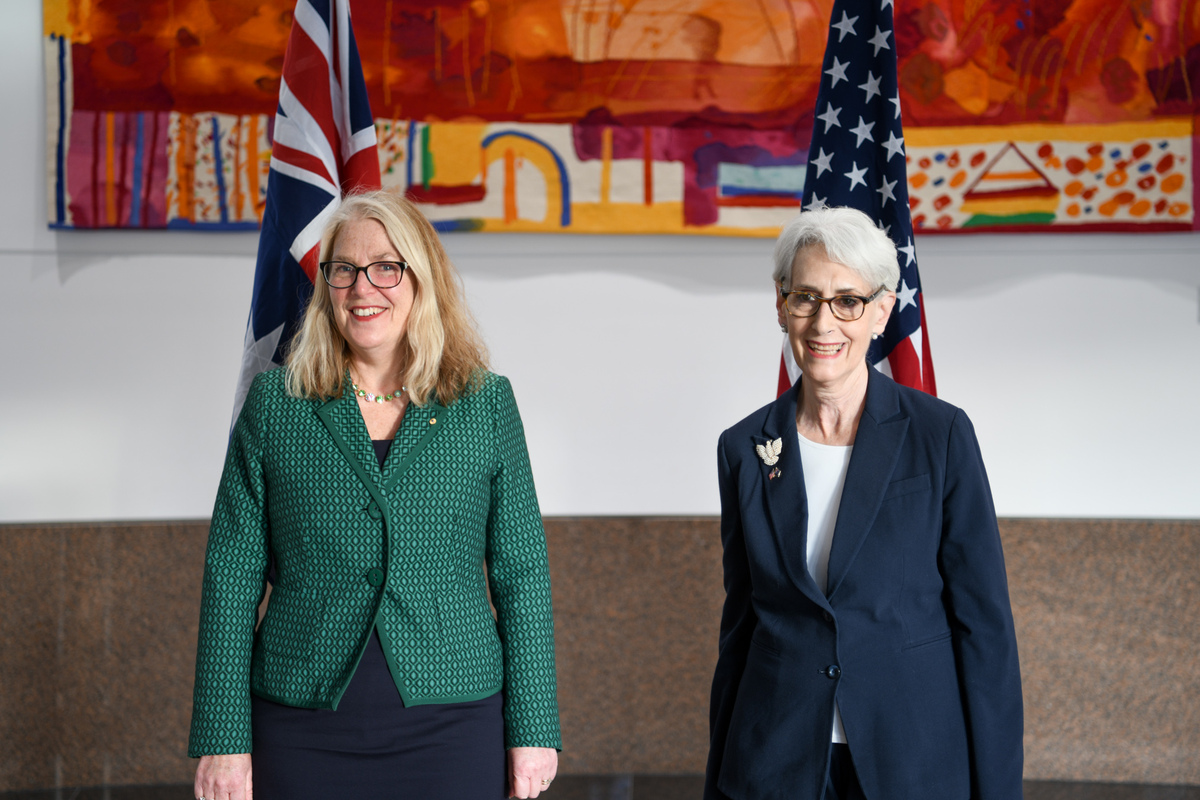
Adams (left) meets with US Deputy Secretary of State Wendy Sherman in 2022

Adams worked as an adviser to Senator Peter Cook, in his capacity as Minister for Trade (1993–94) and Minister for Industry, Science and Technology (1994–96). She returned to Paris to work in the Environment Directorate of the OECD from 1996 to 1998, where she researched trade and environment issues. In 1999 she worked briefly as a consultant on foreign investment and the environment.

Adams joined the Department of Foreign Affairs and Trade (DFAT) in 1999 as Assistant Secretary of the APEC Branch. She subsequently served as Minister Counsellor for Trade at the Australian Embassy in Washington from 2000 to 2004. In that capacity she was involved in negotiations leading to the Australia–United States Free Trade Agreement. Following the completion of the negotiations, she led the Australian advocacy campaign in the USA for the FTA. This contributed to overwhelming Congressional support for the FTA, which entered into force in 2005.

Returning to Australia, Adams held positions with DFAT as First Assistant Secretary in the Free Trade Agreement Division (2009-2013) and Deputy Secretary (2013-2015). In the first position she was lead negotiator for Australia during the bilateral Free Trade Agreement (FTA) negotiations with respectively China, Japan, South Korea and India. In the latter position she took a leading role for Australia in the ongoing negotiations about the Trade in Services Agreement (TiSA).

In December 2004, Adams was announced as Australia's Ambassador for the Environment (2005–2007), and later served as Ambassador for Climate Change (2007–2009). In that role she headed the policy development that led to the establishment of the significant six-nation Asia-Pacific Partnership on Clean Development and Climate (AP6), a voluntary public-private partnership involving Australia, Canada, India, Japan, the People's Republic of China, South Korea and the United States.

Adams served as the Australian Ambassador to the People's Republic of China between February 2016 and July 2019. Adams served as the Australian Ambassador to Japan between October 2020 and July 2022. In June 2022, Prime Minister Anthony Albanese appointed Adams as the new Secretary of DFAT, starting from 1 July 2022.

== Awards ==
Adams received the Australian Public Service Medal (PSM) in 2007, awarded to her for public service in pursuing Australia's international objectives on trade and the environment, particularly the AP6. She was made an Officer of the Order of Australia in the Queen's Birthday 2016 honours.

Diplomatic posts
Preceded by Justin Brown	Australian Ambassador for the Environment; 2005 – 2007	Succeeded by Herself as Ambassador for Climate Change
Preceded by Herself as Ambassador for the Environment	Australian Ambassador for Climate Change; 2007 – 2009	Succeeded by Louise Hand
Preceded by Frances Adamson	Australian Ambassador to China; 2016–2019	Succeeded by Graham Fletcher
Preceded by Richard Court	Australian Ambassador to Japan; 2020–2022	Succeeded by TBD
Government offices
Preceded by Kathryn Campbell	Secretary of the Department of Foreign Affairs and Trade; 2022–present	Incumbent
