= Graham Fletcher (diplomat) =

Australian diplomat

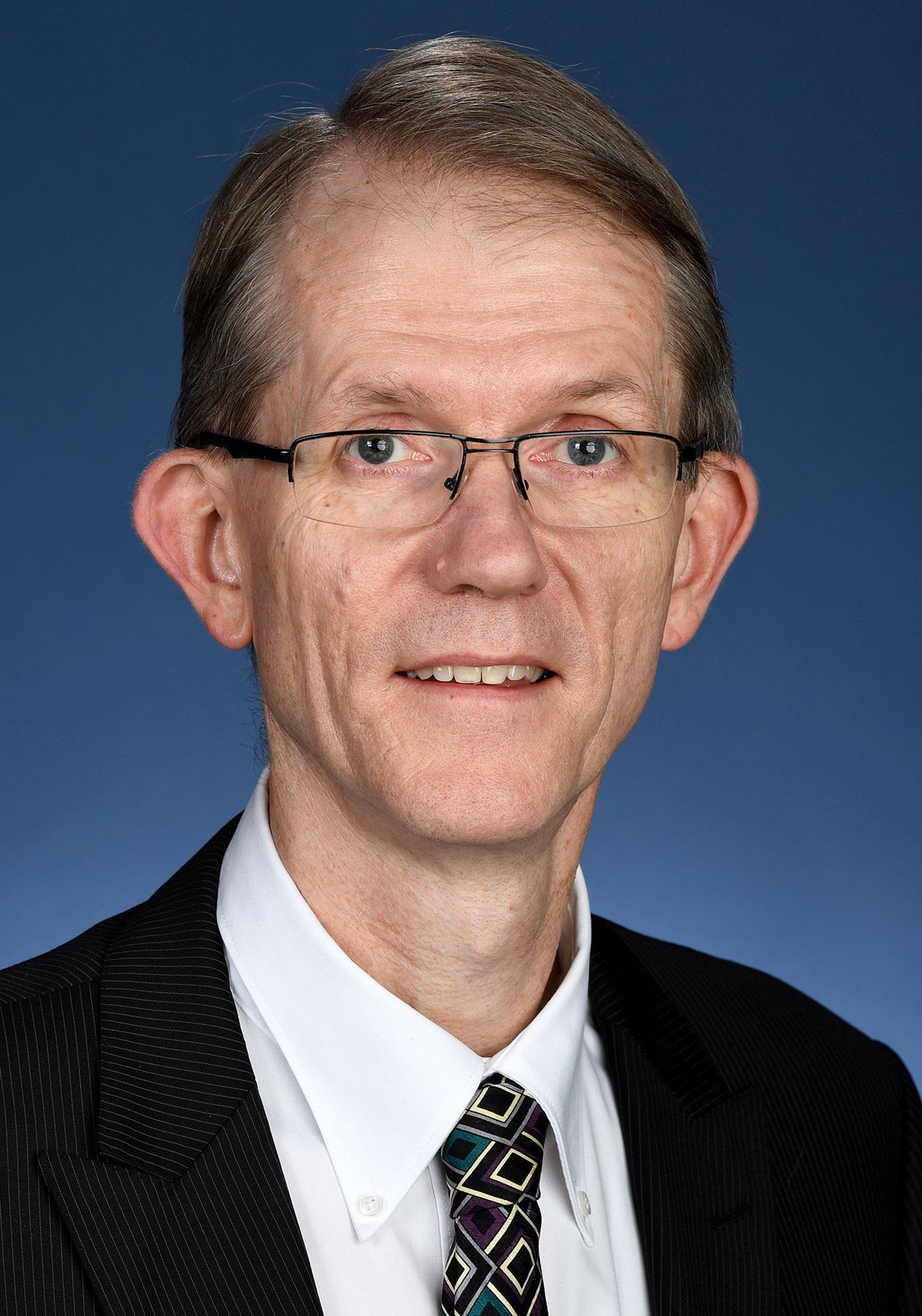

Australian Ambassador to China
- In office 28 August 2019 – January 2024
- Preceded by: Jan Adams
- Succeeded by: Scott Dewar

Personal details
- Education: University of Sydney (BA)
- Occupation: Diplomat

Graham Fletcher is an Australian diplomat who served as the Australian Ambassador to China from August 2019 to January 2024.

== Career ==
Fletcher received a Bachelor of Arts (honours) from the University of Sydney. He joined the Department of Foreign Affairs of Australia in 1983.

Fletcher has been described by ABC News as "a top China specialist who has served three postings in China as an Australian diplomat and is fluent in Mandarin Chinese". He has held the positions of Third Secretary, Beijing (1986–1988); Deputy Consul-General, Nouméa (1992–1994); Counsellor, Beijing (1997–2000); Deputy Head of Mission, Beijing (2004–2008); Head of DFAT North Asia Division (2008–2010; 2015–2019); and Deputy Head of Mission, Washington, D.C. (2011–2013). He led the Australian team in negotiations over the China–Australia Free Trade Agreement which was completed in 2014.

In 2019 Fletcher was appointed Australia's ambassador to China. In 2021 Fletcher was additionally appointed deputy secretary at Department of Foreign Affairs and Trade.

== Personal life ==
Fletcher is married with three children.

Diplomatic posts
Preceded by Jan Adams	Australian Ambassador to China; 2019–	Incumbent
