= List of ambassadors of Australia to Japan =

Ambassador of Australia to Japan

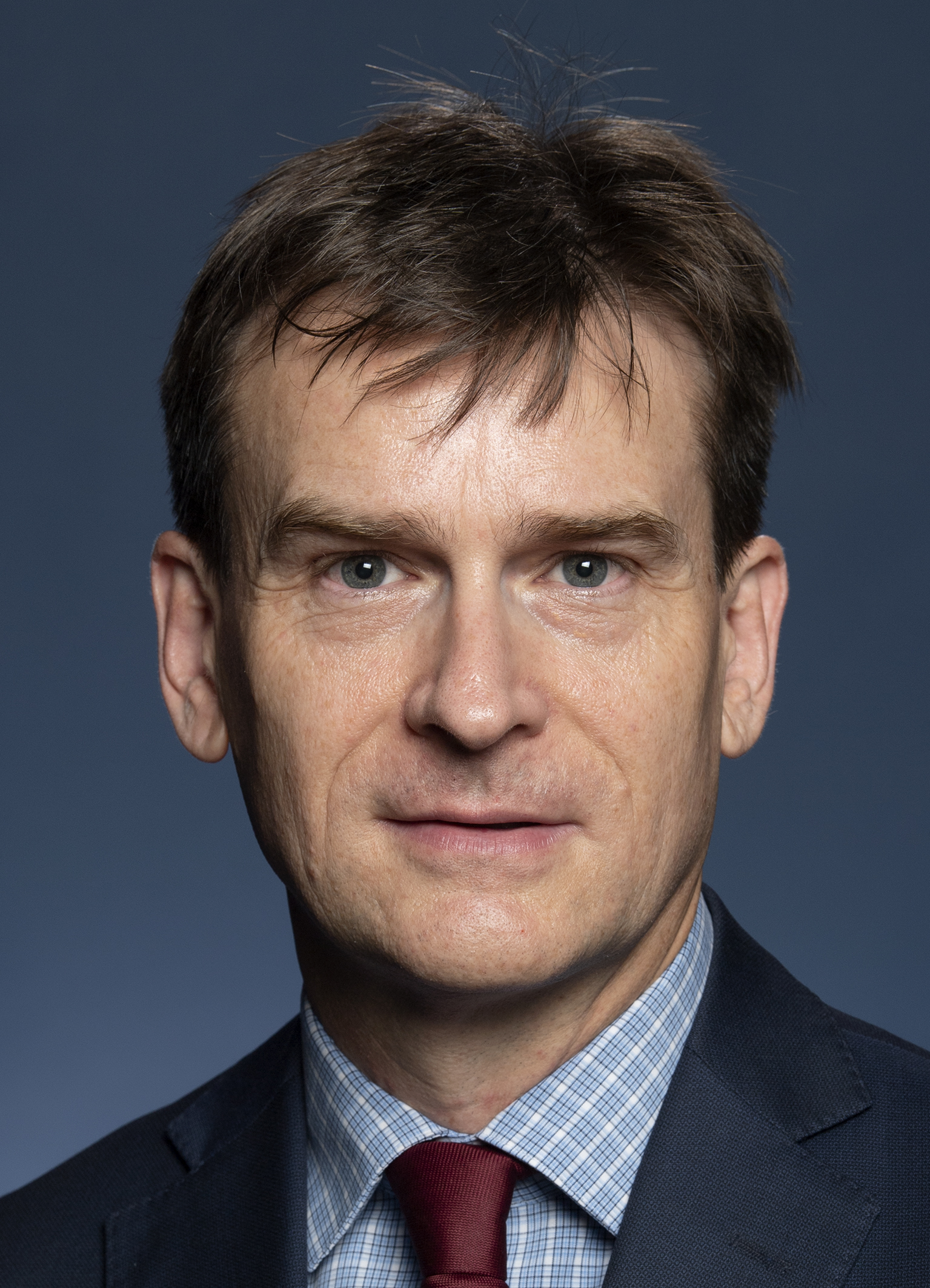
- Incumbent; Justin Hayhurst since 24 April 2023
- Department of Foreign Affairs and Trade
- Style: His Excellency
- Reports to: Minister for Foreign Affairs
- Nominator: Prime Minister of Australia
- Appointer: Governor General of Australia
- Inaugural holder: Sir John Latham
- Formation: 17 August 1940
- Website: Australian Embassy, Tokyo

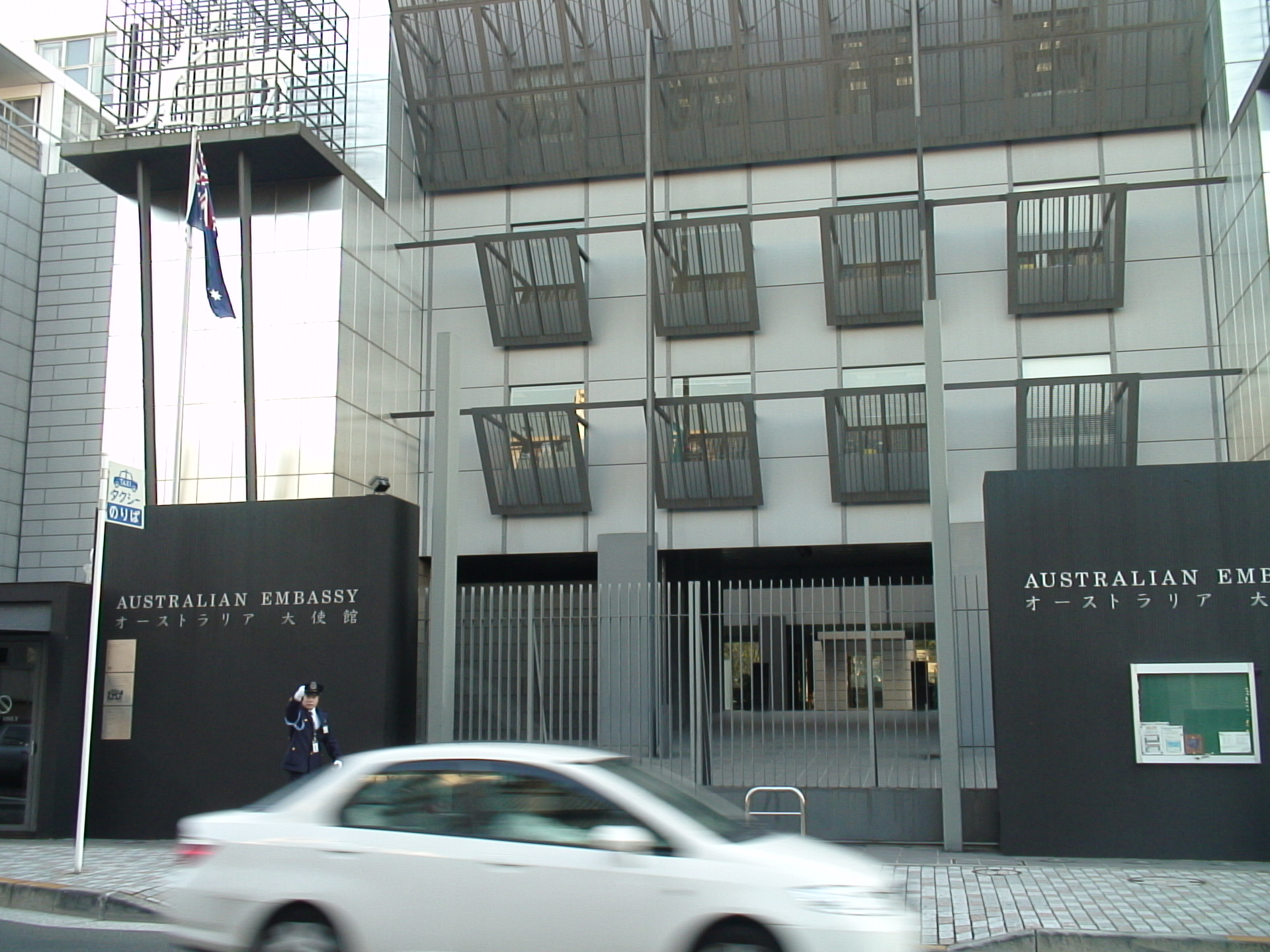
The Australian Embassy in Tokyo.

The ambassador of Australia to Japan is an officer of the Australian Department of Foreign Affairs and Trade and the head of the Embassy of the Commonwealth of Australia to Japan. The position has the rank and status of an ambassador extraordinary and plenipotentiary and is based in the Australian Embassy in Tokyo. Peter Roberts OAM is currently filling in as chargé d’affaires.

== Posting history ==
Japan and Australia have enjoyed full diplomatic relations since 1940 when the Australian Legation opened and the first Minister, Sir John Latham, presented credentials to Emperor Showa in January 1941. The legation in Japan is one of Australia's earliest independent diplomatic missions outside the British Empire, closely following the legation in the United States established on 1 March 1940. Latham's appointment replaced the semi-diplomatic work of the Australian Trade Commission in Tokyo, headed by trade commissioner Eric Longfield Lloyd, who was appointed in June 1935.

Longfield Lloyd's work, notwithstanding his limited ability to engage with matters outside of trade, was complicated by his vague status as a 'Trade Commissioner', a title that had no formal recognition of diplomatic status. As Australia was the only nation present in Japan that was represented by someone other than an ambassador, minister or consul, it gradually became clear that a higher-ranked appointment was needed. In November 1937, in order to help clarify his position, the term 'Trade' was removed from Longfield Lloyd's title to become the Australian 'Commissioner' in Tokyo. This did not change his diplomatic status however and Latham's appointment in August 1940 was praised as solving this issue: "[Longfield Lloyd] has been confined almost exclusively to trade matters. In this respect he has rendered excellent service to both countries. The appointment of Sir John Latham, however, to a diplomatic post in Japan is something of far more importance."

Full diplomatic relations were severed between December 1941 and 1952 on account of the declaration of war and the post-war occupation of Japan. In March 1947 a new Minister to Japan was appointed, but rather than being accredited to the Japanese Government they were accredited to the Supreme Commander for the Allied Powers, owing to the Occupation of Japan, and they also served as the British Commonwealth member on the Allied Council for Japan.

== List of heads of mission ==
Ordinal	Officeholder	Title	Term start date	Term end date	Time in office	Notes
(n/a)	Eric Longfield Lloyd MC	Commissioner	7 June 1935	17 August 1940	5 years, 71 days	
1	Sir John Latham GCMG, QC	Australian Minister to Japan	17 August 1940	8 December 1941	1 year, 113 days	
Relations suspended
2	William Macmahon Ball	Australian Minister to Japan	30 March 1947	August 1947	4 months	
3	Patrick Shaw	Australian Minister to Japan	August 1947	September 1949	2 years, 1 month	
4	Lieutenant Colonel William Roy Hodgson CMG, OBE	Australian Minister to Japan	September 1949	18 April 1952	2 years, 230 days	
5	Edward Ronald Walker	Ambassador of Australia to Japan	18 April 1952	1955	2–3 years	
6	Sir Alan Watt CBE	Ambassador of Australia to Japan	1956	1960	3–4 years	
7	Sir Laurence McIntyre CBE	Ambassador of Australia to Japan	1960	1965	4–5 years	
8	Sir Allen Brown CBE	Ambassador of Australia to Japan	1965	1970	4–5 years	
9	Gordon Freeth	Ambassador of Australia to Japan	1970	1973	2–3 years	
10	Mick Shann CBE	Ambassador of Australia to Japan	1973	1977	3–4 years	
11	John Menadue	Ambassador of Australia to Japan	1977	1980	2–3 years	
12	Sir James Plimsoll AC, CBE	Ambassador of Australia to Japan	1981	1982	0–1 years	
13	Sir Neil Currie CBE	Ambassador of Australia to Japan	1982	1986	3–4 years	
14	Geoff Miller	Ambassador of Australia to Japan	1986	1989	2–3 years	
15	Rawdon Dalrymple AO	Ambassador of Australia to Japan	1989	1993	3–4 years	
16	Ashton Calvert	Ambassador of Australia to Japan	1993	1998	4–5 years	
17	Peter Grey	Ambassador of Australia to Japan	1998	2001	2–3 years	
18	John McCarthy AO	Ambassador of Australia to Japan	2001	2004	2–3 years	
19	Murray McLean OAM	Ambassador of Australia to Japan	2004	2011	6–7 years	
20	Bruce Miller AO	Ambassador of Australia to Japan	August 2011	January 2017	5 years, 5 months	
21	Richard Court AC	Ambassador of Australia to Japan	April 2017	2020	2–3 years	
22	Jan Adams AO, PSM	Ambassador of Australia to Japan	October 2020	July 2022	1 year, 9 months	
23	Justin Hayhurst	Ambassador of Australia to Japan	April 2023	Incumbent	3 years, 184 days	

== See also ==
- Japan-Australia relations
- Foreign relations of Australia
