= Foreign Investment Review Board =

Board overview
- Formed: 2 April 1976; 50 years ago
- Jurisdiction: Commonwealth of Australia
- Headquarters: Canberra
- Minister responsible: The Hon Dr Jim Chalmers MP, Treasurer
- Board executive: Bruce Miller, Chair
- Website: foreigninvestment.gov.au

The Foreign Investment Review Board (FIRB) is a non statutory body established in 1976 to advise the Treasurer and the Australian Government on Australia's Foreign Investment Policy (the Policy) and its administration. The Board’s role is strictly advisory; responsibility for making decisions regarding the Policy and foreign investment proposals ultimately rests with the Treasurer.

The FIRB assesses most foreign investment proposals under the 'national interest test' and in other cases a "narrower range of factors" under the 'national security test'. The legal authority for making decisions on foreign investments in Australia rests with the Treasurer.

The FIRB's functions include:

- Evaluating foreign investment proposals
- Pushing Australian equity participation in new investors who want to invest in Australia
- Monitor foreign-controlled businesses in Australia
- Liaise with state and local governments
