= Bruce Miller (diplomat) =

Australian diplomat

Bruce Miller AO
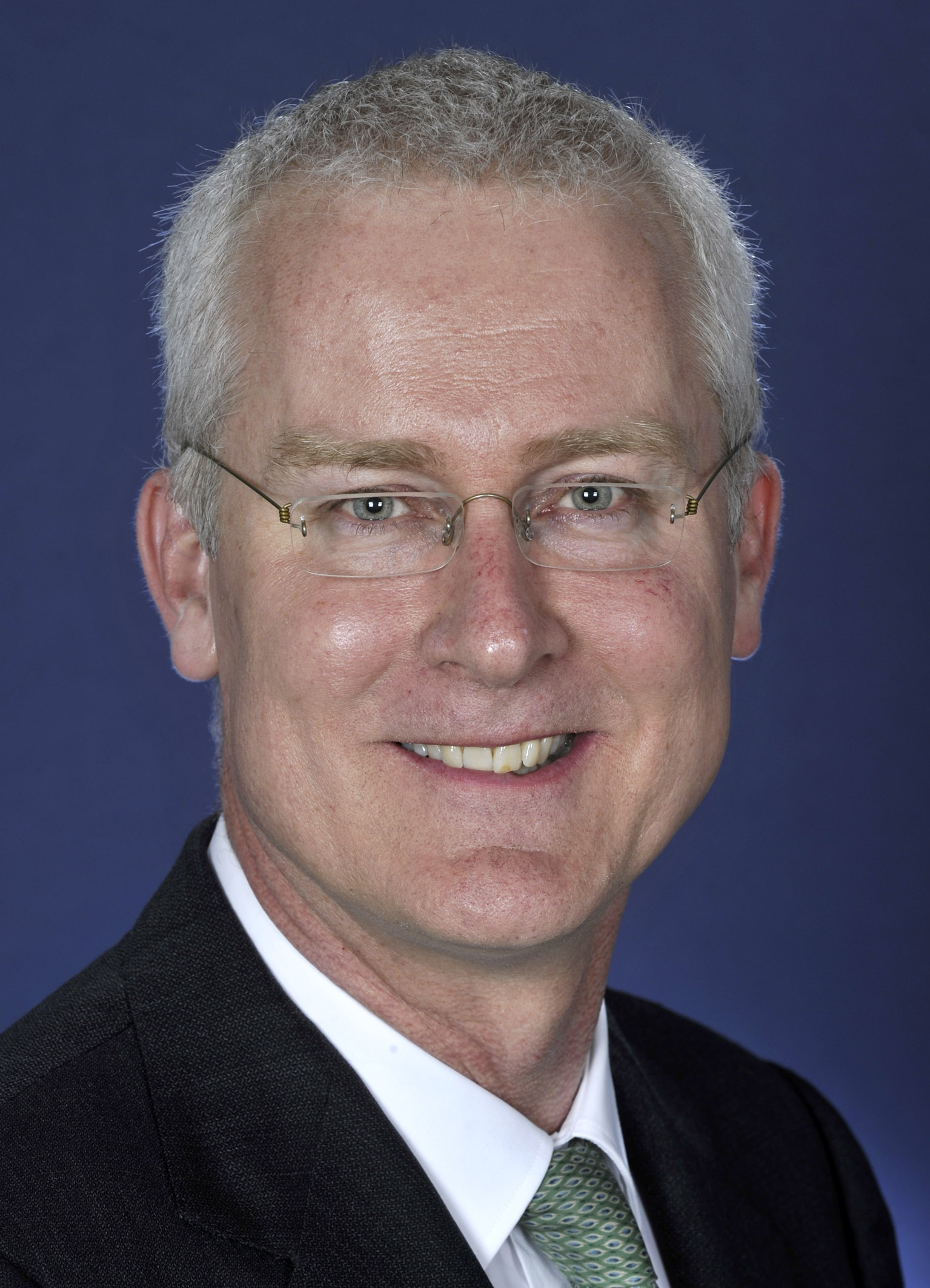

16th Ambassador of Australia to Japan
- In office 16 August 2011 – 11 April 2017
- Prime Minister: Kevin Rudd; Julia Gillard; Tony Abbott; Malcolm Turnbull
- Governor General: Quentin Bryce; Peter Cosgrove
- Preceded by: Murray McLean
- Succeeded by: Richard Court

Personal details
- Born: Bruce Miller; 1961 (age 64–65) Sydney, New South Wales, Australia
- Education: University of Sydney
- Occupation: Diplomat, public servant

Bruce James Miller AO (born 1961) is an Australian diplomat who was Australian Ambassador to Japan from 2011 until 2017. He was Director-General of the Office of National Assessments before retiring from the public service in December 2017. Since then, he has taken up a number of private sector and academic roles, including as a non-executive director of Japanese owned life insurance company TAL.

He graduated from the Faculty or Arts and the Faculty of Law of the University of Sydney, and joined the then Department of Foreign Affairs in 1986. He served overseas in Tehran (1986–89), and in Tokyo (1992–96, 2004–08, and finally as Ambassador to Japan 2011-2017). He worked in three different Government departments, the Department of Foreign Affairs and Trade, the Department of the Prime Minister and Cabinet (1997–98), and the Office of National Assessments (2009-11 as Deputy Director-General, and then as A/g Director-General for a year in 2017). He worked mainly on Australia’s political and economic relations with North Asia, international security and international legal issues. He was appointed as Chair of the Australia Japan Foundation of the Department of Foreign Affairs and Trade in August 2020.

Growing up with an interest in East Asia and its culture since the age of 11, he learned to speak Japanese while at university, including studying in Japan 1981-83.

In 2011, Miller was announced to replace Murray McLean as Ambassador of Australia to Japan, on 7 April that year, shortly after the 2011 Tōhoku earthquake and tsunami, and arrived to take up his posting in August.

In 2022, Miller was appointed Chair of the Australian Government Foreign Investment Review Board, succeeding David Irvine after his death.

Diplomatic posts
| Preceded by Murray McLean | Australian Ambassador to Japan; 2011–2017 | Succeeded by Richard Court |
