= List of ambassadors of Australia to China =

Ambassador of Australia to China

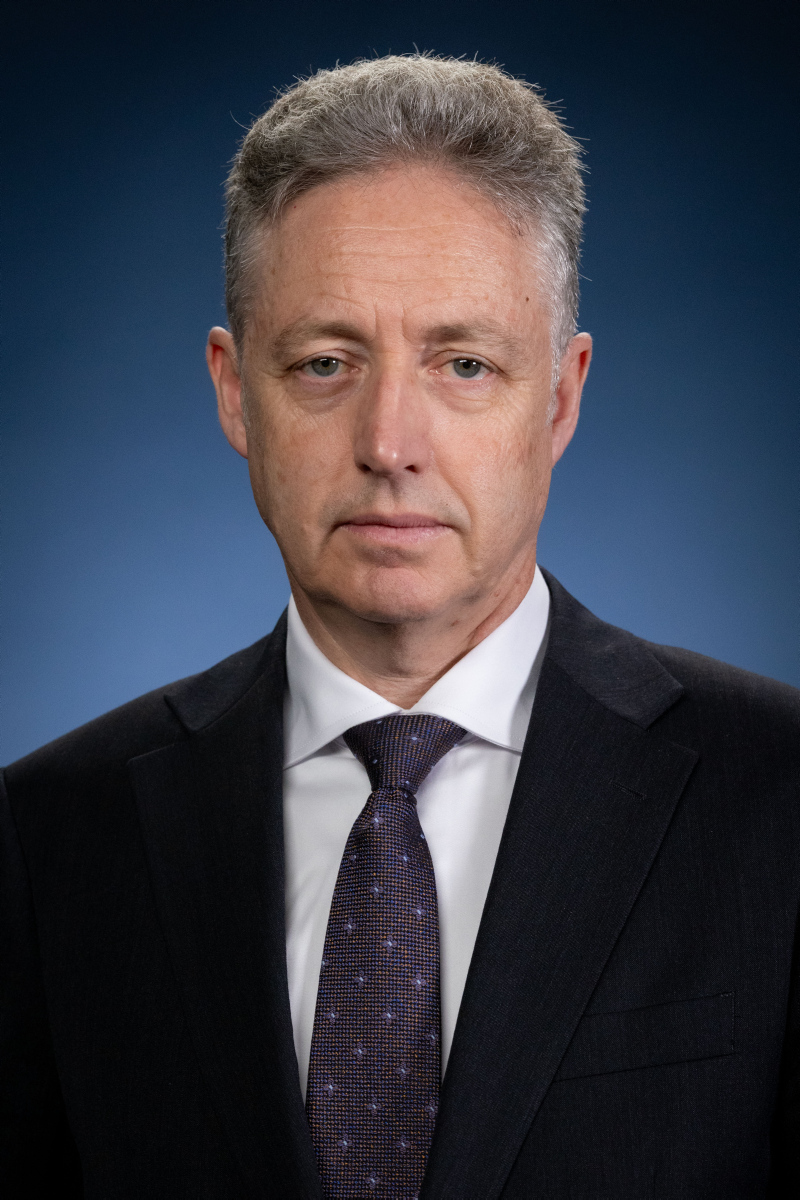
- Incumbent; Scott Dewar since January 2024
- Department of Foreign Affairs and Trade
- Style: His Excellency
- Reports to: Minister for Foreign Affairs
- Residence: Beijing
- Nominator: Prime Minister of Australia
- Appointer: Governor General of Australia
- Inaugural holder: Frederic Eggleston
- Formation: 28 October 1941
- Website: Australian Embassy, China

The ambassador of Australia to China is an officer of the Australian Department of Foreign Affairs and Trade and the head of the Embassy of the Commonwealth of Australia to the People's Republic of China (PRC). The position has the rank and status of an ambassador extraordinary and plenipotentiary and has lived in Beijing since 1973. The incumbent ambassador is Scott Dewar who took up the appointment in January 2024. The ambassador's work is assisted by multiple consulates throughout the country that have visiting and reporting responsibilities, as well as handling consular and trade matters for the embassy.

== Posting history ==
Australia's first diplomatic representative in China was Vivian Gordon Bowden, who in 1935 was appointed as a trade commissioner based in Shanghai. The establishment of trade commissions in several Asian countries was an initiative of the Lyons government first announced in 1933, where previously Australian interests had been represented by the United Kingdom. Bowden's office was based in the HSBC Building within the Shanghai International Settlement. Bowden served until 1941 when he was transferred to Singapore, with the trade commission taken over by the new formal legation in Chongqing.

Australia's legation was first accredited to the Republic of China and was located in Chongqing from 1941 to 1946, with the first Minister, Sir Frederic Eggleston, presenting his credentials to President Lin Sen on 30 October 1941. The legation later moved to Nanjing from June 1946 to 1949, initially located at 34 Peiping Road and then 26 Yihe Road. Following the Proclamation of the People's Republic of China in 1949, the Australian Government recalled its Ambassador from China to discuss recognition of the Communist Government. The Government of the Republic of China, having retreated to Taipei, Taiwan, maintained its embassy in Australia until December 1972. In 1966 Australia opened an embassy in Taipei. In 1972, diplomatic relations ceased following the decision of the government of Prime Minister Gough Whitlam to recognise the People's Republic of China, and the Taipei Embassy closed in 1973. As a result of Australia's recognition of the PRC in 1973, Australia has no diplomatic representation in Taiwan and continues economic, trade and cultural relations through the Australian Office in Taipei.

After diplomatic recognition of the PRC in 1972, Australia established an embassy in Beijing in 1973, followed by Consulates-General in Shanghai (1984), Guangzhou (1992), and Chengdu (2013). The latter was opened following release of the Asian Century White Paper by the Gillard government, and calls for an expanded diplomatic footprint in China. On 9 November 2014 the Minister for Foreign Affairs, Julie Bishop, formally opened the Australian Consulate-General in Chengdu. In March 2017, an agreement was signed to establish a fifth Australian Consulate-General in 2018, to be located in the northern city of Shenyang. From 1991 to 2008, the ambassador to China was also accredited to Mongolia.

== List of officeholders ==
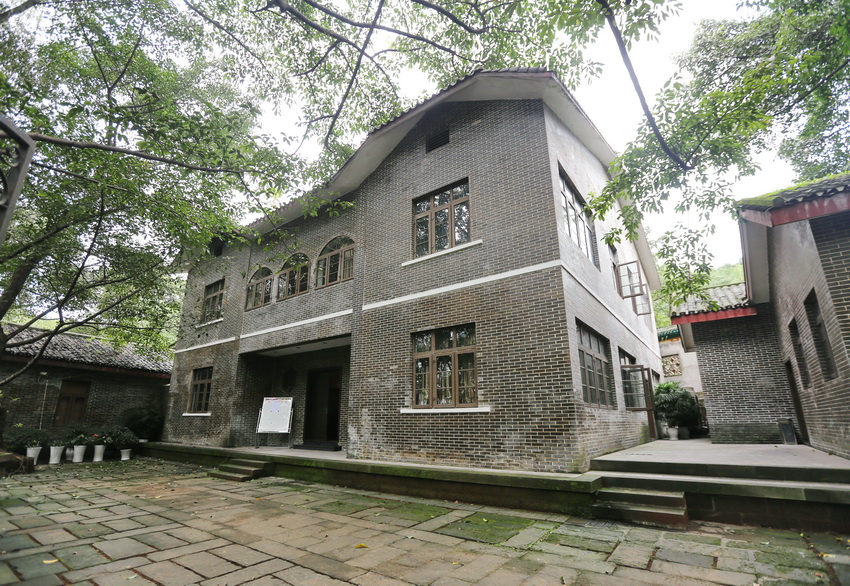
Building of the former Australian Legation in Chongqing, 1941–1946.

=== Heads of Mission ===
==== Republic of China, 1941–1949 ====
#	Name	Office	Term start date	Term end date	Time in office	Notes
1	Frederic Eggleston	Minister	28 October 1941	25 February 1944	2 years, 120 days	
–	Keith Officer	Chargé d'affaires	25 February 1944	15 October 1945	1 year, 232 days	
2	Douglas Copland	Minister	1 January 1946	7 June 1948	2 years, 158 days	
–	Osmond Charles Fuhrman	Chargé d'affaires	7 June 1948	14 November 1948	160 days	
3	Keith Officer	Ambassador	15 November 1948	17 October 1949	336 days	
Relations suspended

==== Republic of China, 1966–1973 ====
#	Name	Office	Term start date	Term end date	Time in office	Notes
–	Walter Handmer	Chargé d'affaires	1966	1966	0 years	
4	Frank Bell Cooper	Ambassador	1966	1969	2–3 years	
5	Hugh Dunn	Ambassador	1969	1972	2–3 years	
–	Tony Godfrey-Smith	Chargé d'affaires	1972	1973	0–1 years	
For Australian ambassadors after 1973 see the list of representatives of the Australian Office in Taipei

==== People's Republic of China, 1973–present ====
#	Name	Office	Other offices	Term start date	Term end date	Time in office	Notes
1	Stephen FitzGerald	Ambassador		1973	1976	2–3 years	
2	Garry Woodard	Ambassador		1976	1980	3–4 years	
3	Hugh Dunn	Ambassador		1980	1984	3–4 years	
4	Dennis Argall	Ambassador		1984	1985	0–1 years	
5	Ross Garnaut	Ambassador		1985	1988	2–3 years	
6	David Sadleir	Ambassador		1988	1991	2–3 years	
7	Michael Lightowler	Ambassador	^{A}	1991	1996	4–5 years	
8	Ric Smith	Ambassador	^{A}	1996	2000	3–4 years	
9	David Irvine	Ambassador	^{A}	2000	2003	2–3 years	
10	Alan Thomas	Ambassador	^{A}	2003	2007	3–4 years	
11	Geoff Raby	Ambassador	^{A}	2007	2011	3–4 years	
12	Frances Adamson	Ambassador		2011	2015	3–4 years	
13	Jan Adams AO, PSM	Ambassador		February 2016	July 2019	3 years, 5 months	
14	Graham Fletcher	Ambassador		28 August 2019	January 2024	4 years, 126 days	
15	Scott Dewar	Ambassador		January 2024	incumbent	2 years, 249 days	

==== Notes ====
^A Also non-resident Australian Ambassador to Mongolia, 1991 to 2008.

=== Deputy Heads of Mission ===
Name	Start of term	End of term	References
Colin S. Heseltine	1982	1985	
David Ambrose	1985	1988	
Colin S. Heseltine	1988	1992	
Sam Gerovich	1992	1997	
Penny Richards	1997	2000	
Lydia Morton	2000	2003	
Graham Fletcher	2003	2008	
Graeme Meehan	2008	2012	
Justin Hayhurst	2012	November 2016	
Gerald Thomson	November 2016	December 2019	
Jason Robertson	January 2020	present	

=== Consuls-General ===
Location	Open	Consular district
Consulate-General, Hong Kong	1972	Hong Kong SAR, Macau SAR
Consulate-General, Shanghai	1984	Shanghai Municipality, Anhui, Hubei, Jiangsu, Jiangxi, and Zhejiang
Consulate-General, Guangzhou	1992	Guangdong, Hainan, Fujian, Hunan, Guangxi Zhuang AR
Consulate-General, Chengdu	2013	Sichuan, Yunnan, Guizhou, Municipality of Chongqing
Consulate-General, Shenyang	2019	Jilin, Liaoning, Heilongjiang

==== Chengdu ====
Name	Start of term	End of term	References
Nancy Gordon	30 May 2013	7 November 2016	
Christopher Lim	7 November 2016	4 May 2021	
Adelle Neary	4 May 2021	present	

==== Guangzhou ====
Name	Start of term	End of term	References
Maurine Chong	November 1992	31 May 1996	
Zena Armstrong	31 May 1996	28 September 1999	
John Courtney	28 September 1999	11 September 2003	
Kevin Magee	11 September 2003	25 October 2006	
Sean Kelly	26 January 2007	20 November 2009	
Grant Dooley	20 November 2009	25 June 2012	
Jill Collins	25 June 2012	11 February 2014	
Dominic Trindade	11 February 2014	5 January 2018	
Jason Robertson	5 January 2018	20 November 2022	
Anthony Aspden	20 November 2022	present	

==== Shenyang ====
Name	Start of term	End of term	References
Broughton Robertson	2 March 2019	present	

== See also ==
- List of ambassadors of China to Australia
