= Murray McLean (ambassador) =

Murray McLean AO
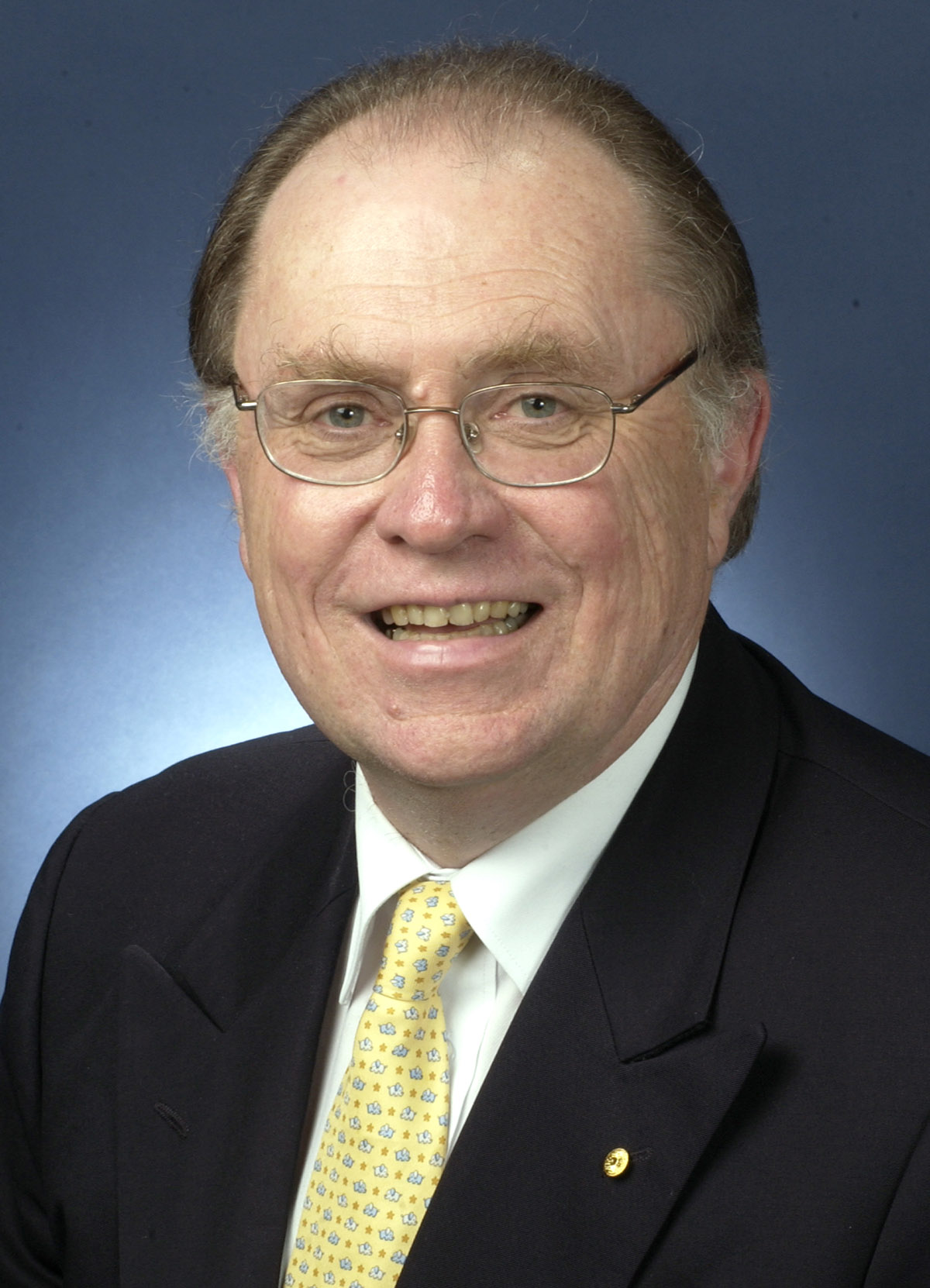
- Murray McLean in 2004

15th Ambassador of Australia to Japan
- In office 15 July 2004 – 7 April 2011
- Governors General: Michael Jeffery; Quentin Bryce
- Prime Minister: John Howard; Kevin Rudd; Julia Gillard
- Preceded by: John McCarthy
- Succeeded by: Bruce Miller

Personal details
- Born: Alistair Murray McLean; 5 February 1947 East Melbourne
- Education: University of Melbourne, University of Hong Kong
- Occupation: Diplomat, public servant

Alistair Murray McLean AO is the former chair of the Australian Government's Australia Japan Foundation, and is a former Non Resident Fellow of the Lowy Institute.

Prior to this, McLean was a senior career officer of the Australian Department of Foreign Affairs and Trade until 29 February 2012. He joined the department as the Department of External Affairs (later Department of Foreign Affairs and Trade) in 1970 and has had wide experience, particularly on Asian issues.

Fluent in Modern Standard Chinese (Mandarin) his previous postings and placements include: Australian high commissioner (head of mission) to Singapore (1997–2001); Australian consul-general in Shanghai Australian consulate-general, Shanghai (1987–92); political counsellor, Australian embassy, Washington, D.C. (1983–86); counsellor in Beijing (1979–83), as well as earlier postings in Beijing (1973–76), and Hong Kong (1971–73). McLean arrived in Tokyo on 24 November 2004 to take up his appointment as Australia's ambassador to Japan, which ran until August 2011.

His senior executive roles in the department also included: deputy secretary (February – November 2004); first assistant secretary, North Asia Division (2001–04) and assistant secretary, East Asia Branch (1992–96).

In 1991, McLean was awarded the Order of Australia Medal (OAM) for his services to international relations, particularly as Australian consul general in Shanghai.

In 2013, he was made an Officer of the Order of Australia (AO).

In 2014, the Japanese Government honoured McLean with the award of Grand Cordon of the Order of the Rising Sun, its highest award for foreigners, in recognition of his distinguished achievements in international relations.

McLean is a B.A. (Hons) graduate from the University of Melbourne in 1969, and later studied Chinese at the University of Hong Kong.

He completed his secondary schooling at Benalla High School and Geelong College, where he was Head Prefect in 1965.

Born in 1947, he is married with two adult children and three grandchildren. His interests include golf, tennis, classical music and Asian arts and antiquities.

Diplomatic posts
| Preceded by John McCarthy | Australian Ambassador to Japan; 2004 – 2011 | Succeeded by Bruce Miller |
