= Stephen FitzGerald (diplomat) =

Australian diplomat (born 1938)

Stephen FitzGerald AO
- Born: Stephen Arthur FitzGerald; 1938 (age 87–88); Hobart, Tasmania
- Education: University of Tasmania; Australian National University
- Occupations: Public servant, diplomat
- Known for: Ambassador to China, 1973–1976
- Spouse: Gay FitzGerald (nee Overton) (m. 1961)
- Children: Ingrid, Justine and Jack

Stephen Arthur FitzGerald AO (born 1938) is a former Australian diplomat. He was Australian Ambassador to China, its first to the People's Republic of China, between 1973 and 1976.

== Life and career ==
=== Birth, education and early career ===
FitzGerald was born in Hobart, Tasmania in 1938. He was educated at the Launceston Church Grammar School, graduating in 1956. Between 1957 and 1960, FitzGerald attended the University of Tasmania. One of the courses FitzGerald took, Asian History run by New Zealander George Wilson, helped him to develop an interest in Asia.

FitzGerald joined the Australian Public Service in the Department of External Affairs in 1961. He learnt to speak Chinese at RAAF Point Cook. He arrived in Hong Kong in 1962 on official duties, which he described as the "centre of China-watching". He enjoyed his time there immensely, but did feel uncomfortable with the city being still being a British colony.

He resigned from the external affairs department in 1966 when he disagreed with the then government's support for the United States' military intervention during the Vietnam War and also the government's refusal to recognise the Communist government of China.

FitzGerald received his PhD from the Australian National University. During his studies, in 1968, he visited Quanzhou, Shanghai and several other cities on a student tour at the height of the Chinese Cultural Revolution—the streets were filled with posters, loudspeakers and truck-loads of drummers broadcasting to pedestrians. His thesis discussed contemporary China’s relations with overseas Chinese.

In 1971, FitzGerald was appointed Fellow in Far Eastern Studies at the Australian National University.

=== China: FitzGerald becomes advisor then ambassador ===
In 1971, FitzGerald, as China adviser, was a key member of a political delegation to China led by then Labor opposition leader Gough Whitlam. The delegation was there to discuss diplomatic relations.

While Australian Ambassador to China between 1973 and 1976, FitzGerald and his staff were sending reports back to Australia forecasting the economic transformation of China, predicting that China would become the region's dominant power and transition into a period of 10%+ growth. His brief whilst ambassador was to create a relationship between Australia and China. His first official ambassadorial meeting was with then Chinese Foreign Minister Ji Pengfei in April 1973. In June 1976, Prime Minister Fraser visited China.

FitzGerald was appointed Australia's first (and only) Ambassador to North Korea in 1975. He presented his credentials to North Korea's vice president on 30 May 1975.

=== After his ambassadorial appointment ===
On returning to Australia in 1976, FitzGerald rejoined the Australian National University. In 1977 he embarked on a lecture tour, giving a series of talks on China throughout Australia.

In 1980, FitzGerald established a private consultancy for Australian business dealing with government in China. The consultancy continued until 2010.

In 1988, FitzGerald was the Chairman of the Committee to Advise on Australia’s Immigration Policies which submitted a report, known as the FitzGerald Report. The committee found that Australian immigration policy had become captive of migrant lobbies. That year he also championed Asian studies in the context of national education policy. He gave the 1990 Buntine Oration, which he titled "Asia, Education and the Australian Mind."

In 2015 FitzGerald released his book Comrade Ambassador: Whitlam's Beijing Envoy. Author Billy Griffiths, reviewing the book, wrote that it was thoughtful and engaging, covering a transformative period of Australian history. That same year he became a Non-Executive Director of China Matters, an Australian public policy initiative. In 2017 FitzGerald was invited to deliver the Whitlam Oration 2017.

== Awards ==
FitzGerald was made an Officer of the Order of Australia in January 1984 in recognition of his services to international relations. In October 2015 Launceston Church Grammar School awarded FitzGerald a Distinguished Alumni Award. FitzGerald was shortlisted for the 2016 National Biography Award for Comrade Ambassador: Whitlam’s Beijing Envoy.

== Works ==
- FitzGerald, Stephen (1977). China and the World. ANU Press.
- FitzGerald, Stephen (2015). Comrade Ambassador: Whitlam's Beijing Envoy. Melbourne University Publishing.

Diplomatic posts
Vacant Proclamation of the People's Republic of China Title last held by Keith Officer	Australian Ambassador to China; 1973–1976	Succeeded by Garry Woodard
New title Position established	Australian Ambassador to North Korea; 1975–1976	Vacant Diplomatic relations ceased
