= A. C. V. Melbourne =

Australian historian

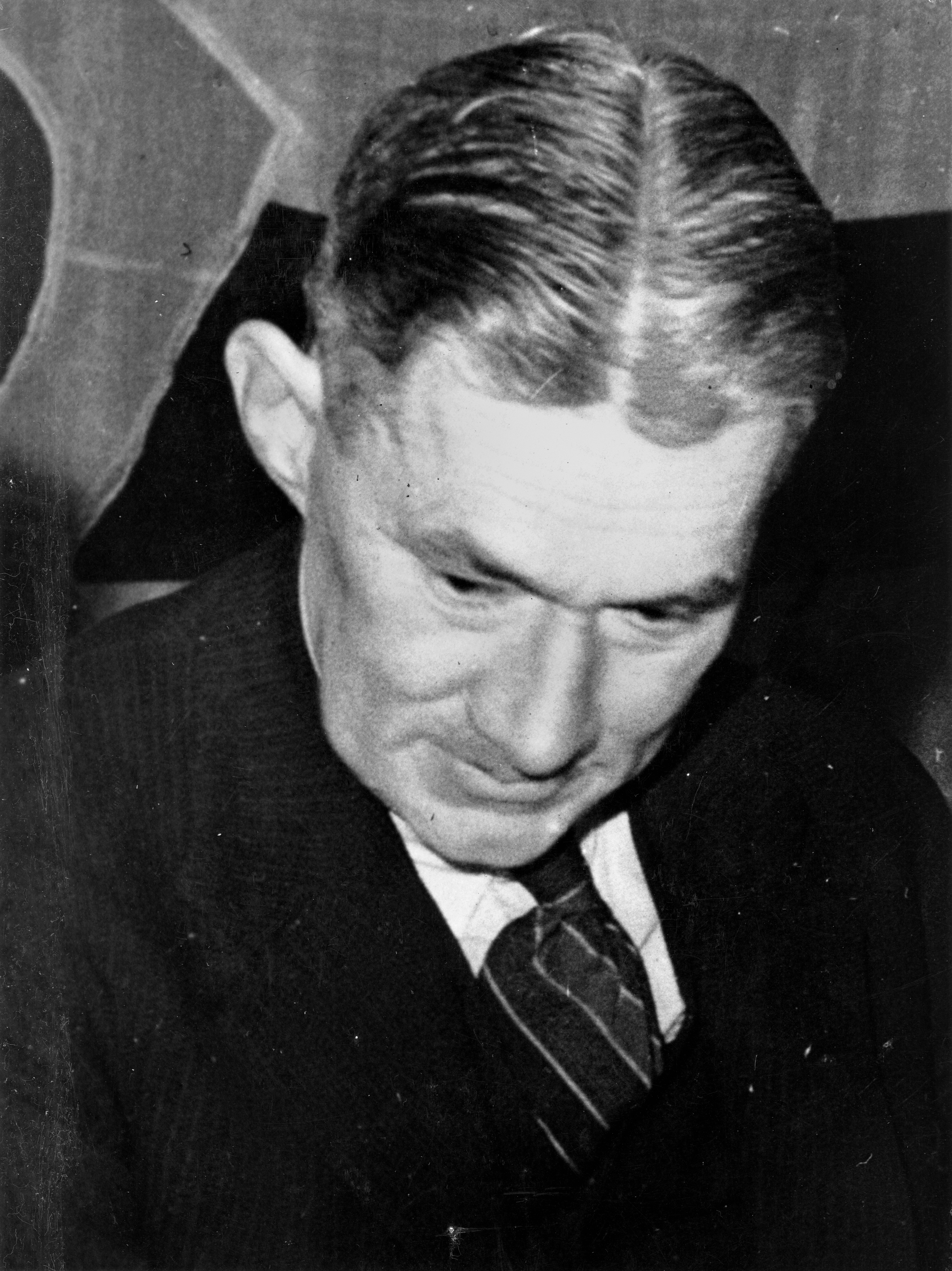
- Melbourne c. 1940
- Born: Alexander Clifford Vernon Melbourne; 10 June 1888; Hackney, South Australia, Australia
- Died: 7 January 1943 (aged 54); Brisbane, Queensland, Australia
- Education: University of Queensland; University of Adelaide; University of London
- Occupation: Historian
- Spouse: Ellen Lowenthal (m. 1919)

Alexander Clifford Vernon Melbourne (10 June 1888 – 7 January 1943) was an Australian historian and writer. He had a long involvement with the University of Queensland as a lecturer and associate professor in history. Initially concentrating on Australian constitutional history, he later developed an interest in international relations and foreign policy, notably Australia–China and Australia–Japan relations.

== Early life ==
Melbourne was born on 10 June 1888 in Hackney, South Australia. He was the son of Elizabeth Agnes (née Braidwood) and William Clifford Melbourne; his father was a printer and trade union official.

Melbourne attended Norwood Public School and then trained as a pupil-teacher, teaching at Unley Public School for three years. He went on to attend the University of Adelaide, graduating in 1910 with honours in history.

== Career ==
=== Early career and military service ===
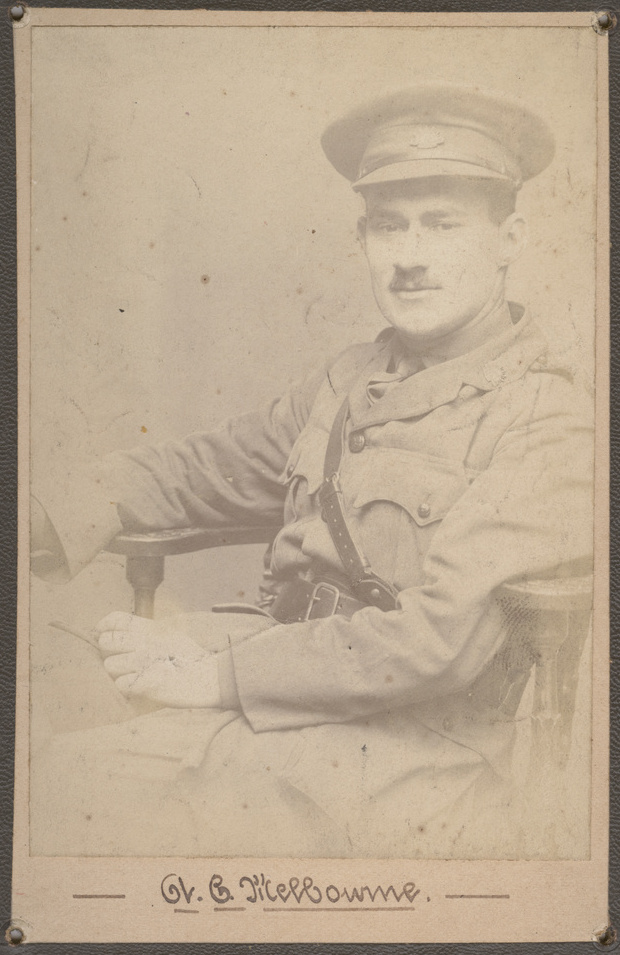
Melbourne as a soldier c. 1915

In 1913, Melbourne moved to Brisbane and joined the University of Queensland's history and economics department as a temporary assistant lecturer. He was a founding member of the Historical Society of Queensland, serving as its inaugural honorary secretary and delivering the inaugural address at its first meeting. The paper he presented was titled "Methods of Historical Research" and has been described as "probably the first time a professional historian spoke and wrote about historiography in Queensland".

Melbourne enlisted in the Australian Imperial Force (AIF) in August 1914 as a captain in the 9th Battalion. He served on the Gallipoli campaign and was wounded in the landing at Anzac Cove on 25 April 1915, receiving a further injury in June 1915. He was invalided back to Australia in October 1915 and returned to the University of Queensland, also undertaking work in wartime censorship.

=== Academia ===
In 1919, Melbourne was appointed as a lecturer in history and industrial history at the University of Queensland. He was an unsuccessful candidate for the university's newly created professorial chair in history in 1924, losing out to Henry Alcock. He later made unsuccessful applications for professorships at the University of Sydney (1929), University of Adelaide (1934), and University of Melbourne (1937).

Melbourne was eventually elevated to the rank of associate professor at the University of Queensland in the 1930s. He served on the university's academic senate from 1926 to 1928 and from 1932 to 1943, and was heavily involved in the planning of the new campus at St Lucia. He was remembered by vice-chancellor John Douglas Story as "one of the most virile and progressive members of the Senate".

=== Publications ===
Melbourne's early interests were in Australian constitutional history. He completed a Master of Arts at the University of Adelaide in 1921, with a thesis on the constitutional development of Queensland. In 1925 he began writing Queensland History, a serialised column published in the Daily Mail and intended for publication as a book, which never eventuated. In 1928, Melbourne was awarded a Laura Spelman Rockefeller Memorial fellowship to study in England, completing a Ph.D. under A. P. Newton in 1930. He subsequently contributed two chapters to volume seven of Newton's Cambridge History of the British Empire (1933) and published Early Constitutional Development in Australia (1934).

Melbourne's later work concentrated on international relations and Australian relations with Asia. He visited China and Japan on behalf of the University of Queensland in 1931 and 1932. His subsequent publication Report on Australian Intercourse with Japan and China recommended that the Australian government send an official delegation to Asia, which with a similar publication by H. W. Gepp influenced John Latham's Australian Eastern Mission in 1934. Melbourne chaired the federal government's Advisory Committee on Eastern Trade from 1933 to 1935 and was an unsuccessful applicant to become Australia's first trade commissioner to Japan in 1935. He returned to China and Japan in 1936 and published Report on a Visit to the Universities of China and Japan in the same year.

== Personal life ==
In 1916, Melbourne married Ellen Mary Lowenthal; the couple had no children. He died of a cerebral hemorrhage at a private hospital in Brisbane on 7 January 1943, aged 54. His sudden death was described by the university's chancellor James William Blair as a "great loss to our educational progress".
