= Frederic Cutlack =

Australian journalist and military historian (1886 - 1967)

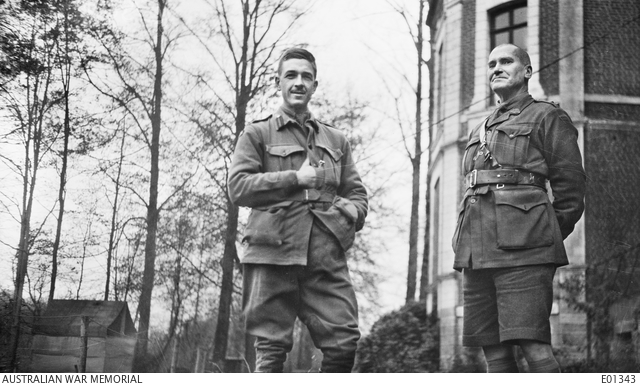
- Frederic Cutlack, centre, with another officer on the headquarters staff of the Australian 3rd Division in November 1917
- Born: Frederic Morley Cutlack; 30 September 1886; Upper Lancing, Sussex, England
- Died: 27 November 1967 (aged 81); Burwash, Sussex, England

Academic work
- Main interests: Australian military history First World War
- Notable works: Volume VIII of Official History of Australia in the War of 1914–1918

Frederic Morley Cutlack (30 September 1886 – 27 November 1967) was an Australian journalist and military historian. He was an author of a number of books on aspects of Australian military history, including one of the volumes of the official history series Official History of Australia in the War of 1914–1918.

Born in England in 1886, Cutlack's family emigrated to Australia in 1891. After he completed schooling he began working as a journalist for a newspaper in South Australia. He was studying law in England when the First World War broke out and immediately joined the British Army. He served on the Western Front, including a period attached to the Australian 3rd Division where he made the acquaintance of Charles Bean. In late 1917, he was recruited as an official war correspondent for the Australian Imperial Force by Bean and worked in this capacity until the end of the war. He resumed his career in journalism, having become a barrister. He wrote the history of the Australian Flying Corps, a volume of the Official History of Australia in the War of 1914–1918 as well as other books on aspects of Australian military history. He died in England in 1967, having moved there in his later years.

== Early life ==
Frederic Morley Cutlack was born in Upper Lancing, Sussex, in England on 30 September 1886 to Frank Cutlack, a dredging contractor, and his wife Elizabeth née Hall. When Cutlack was 5 years old, the family emigrated to South Australia. He attended school at Renmark before going on to a brilliant academic career at the University College, North Adelaide, when his essays showed an understanding beyond his 16 years. He joined the staff of the Register in 1904, working as a journalist. In 1911, he went to London and began working for the Daily Chronicle. When HMAS Australia made its maiden voyage to Australia, Cuttack was aboard as a correspondent. He then began studying Law

== First World War ==
On the outbreak of the First World War, Cutlack enlisted in the King Edward's Horse, breaking off his law studies. He was commissioned a lieutenant and served on the Western Front from 1915 to 1916. He was next attached to the headquarters of the 3rd Division in April 1917, serving as an intelligence officer. He soon made the acquaintance of Charles Bean, who recruited him as an assistant official war correspondent for the Australian Imperial Force (AIF). He commenced his new role, which entailed him giving up his rank, albeit with pay equivalent to that of a captain in the AIF, in January 1918. By this time he had married Annie Dunlop, the union having taken place in October 1917 at Ealing, in London.

In his new role, Cutlack wrote numerous reports from the frontlines, often exposed to danger. With Bean he visited Villers-Bretonneux← while it was under shellfire during the German spring offensive, started a new magazine for AIF troops, and in addition to his correspondent work reporting on the activities of the AIF, collected material for the war museum that Bean had proposed for Australia. In July 1918, he was injured in a motorbike accident and during his convalescence published a narrative of the exploits of the Australian Corps. On his recovery he continued to report on the doings of the Australian troops although by early 1919 Bean had left for Gallipoli as part of the Australian Historical Mission. Cutlack was discharged in March 1919.

== Postwar period ==
Returning to civilian life, Cutlack was called to the bar in 1919, becoming a barrister. He and his wife moved to Australia the following year where he joined the staff of The Sydney Morning Herald. He left the same year when he was commissioned to write the volume of the Official History of Australia in the War of 1914–1918 that dealt with the Australian Flying Corps. His former colleague Charles Bean was the editor of the official history and worked closely with all the authors writing the various volumes. Cutlack's book, The Australian Flying Corps in the Western and Eastern Theatres of War, 1914–1918, was published in 1923 and sold around 18,500 copies.

With his book completed, Cutlack then joined the staff of Prime Minister Stanley Bruce for the duration of the 1923 Imperial Conference before returning to work at the Sydney Morning Herald. In the mid-1920s, he developed tuberculosis and moved back to Renmark for the climate. He worked as a lawyer for two years before resuming his journalistic career, becoming noted for his work on defence matters. He accompanied John Latham on the Australian Eastern Mission of 1934, after which he published Manchurian Arena, a commentary on the China/Japan relationship. He then edited a volume of General John Monash's wartime correspondence, which was published as War Letters of General Monash in 1935.

== Later life ==
Cutlack's marriage to Elizabeth was annulled in early 1937 and later that year he remarried, to Pauline Curr at Sydney. He continued to work in journalism and for several years was the associate editor at the Herald. He retired in 1947, having worked his final months at the Bulletin. His marriage to Pauline had ended the previous year.

In his final years, Cutlack lived in Burwash in Sussex, working on a book about the Australian soldier Harry Morant, better known as Breaker Morant who, along with Peter Handcock, was executed for murder during the Second Anglo-Boer War. Cutlack met Morant while living in Renmark, and believed his execution to be an inappropriate application of military justice. The book Breaker Morant was published in 1962. Cutlack died five years later, on 27 November 1967.
