= Eric Longfield Lloyd =

Eric Longfield Lloyd MC
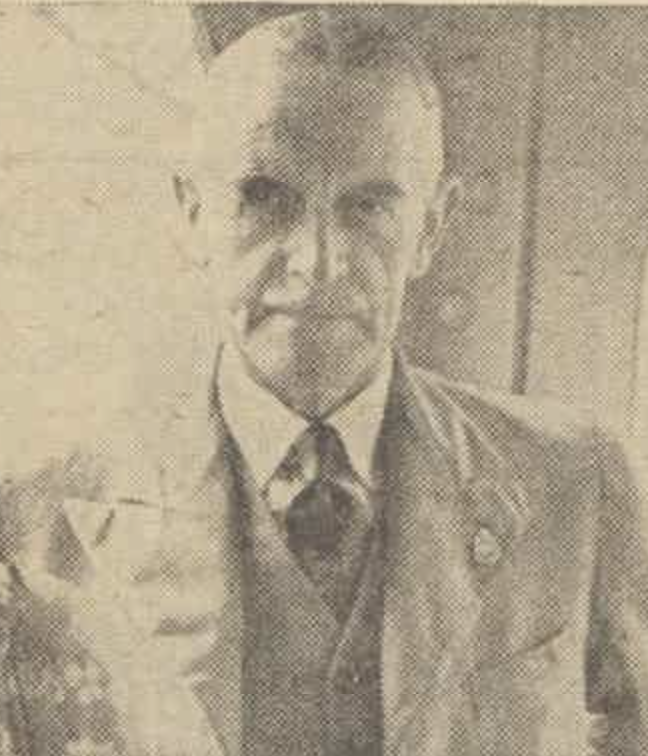
- Lloyd in 1947
- Born: Eric Edwin Longfield Lloyd; 13 September 1890; Marrickville, New South Wales, Australia
- Died: 18 July 1957 (aged 66); Canberra, ACT, Australia
- Education: St Andrew's College, Dublin
- Spouse: Elsie Wilkinson (m. 1916)

Eric Edwin Longfield Lloyd MC (13 September 1890 – 18 July 1957) was an Australian army officer, public servant, and diplomat. He was Australia's inaugural trade commissioner to Japan (1935–1940) and later served as the inaugural director of the Commonwealth Security Service (1941–1945) and Commonwealth Investigation Service (1945–1952).

== Early life ==
Lloyd was born on 13 September 1890 in Marrickville, New South Wales. He was the son of Amelia Sarah (née Hunter) and George Thrift Lloyd, a banker. His father was Irish and the family moved to Ireland when Lloyd was 12, where he attended St Andrew's College, Dublin. After leaving school he moved to London and joined the Union Bank of Australia. He was transferred to the Sydney branch in 1912.

== Military career ==
Lloyd served with King Edward's Horse while living in London and joined the 29th Infantry (Australian Rifles) of the Militia in 1913. He joined the Australian Imperial Force (AIF) as a second lieutenant on the outbreak of World War I. He participated in the landing at Anzac Cove on 25 April 1915 with the 1st Battalion. Lloyd was promoted captain in July 1915 but was invalided back to Australia in January 1916 due to typhoid fever. He was mentioned in despatches and awarded the Military Cross for leading a raid against an Ottoman trench in June 1915. After returning to Australia he joined the intelligence division of the general staff and was not formally demobilised until 1920.

== Public service ==
After leaving the army, Lloyd joined the Prime Minister's Department as a member of the Pacific branch and learned Japanese. In May 1921 he transferred to the Attorney-General's Department as an inspector within its investigation branch. Based in Sydney, he was responsible for monitoring communists, fascists and other extremist organisations, including the New Guard. From 1925 to 1930 he was also aide-de-camp to Dudley de Chair, the governor of New South Wales.

=== Diplomacy ===
Lloyd accompanied external affairs minister John Latham on the Australian Eastern Mission of 1934, the first Australian diplomatic mission to a number of Asian countries. In June 1935 he was appointed as Australia's inaugural trade commissioner in Tokyo, a quasi-diplomatic role. In November 1937, his title was changed to simply "commissioner", a reflection that his duties had expanded beyond trade. He remained in Japan until 1940 when he was succeeded by Latham as the official minister to Japan. Lloyd "proved to be a reliable reporter on Japanese politics and international ambitions", correctly noting the government's expansionist ambitions.

=== Intelligence ===
In March 1941, Lloyd was appointed as the inaugural director of the Commonwealth Security Service (CSS). Following a review, a director-general was appointed the following year to oversee his work. In January 1944 he was additionally made director of the investigation branch of the Commonwealth Investigation Branch (CIB). The two organisations were merged in 1945 to form the Commonwealth Investigation Service (CIS), with Lloyd as director. The CIS was underresourced and subject to political criticism, effectively being superseded by the new Australian Security Intelligence Organisation (ASIO) in 1949. Lloyd retired in 1952.

== Personal life ==
Lloyd married Elsie Lilian Wilkinson in 1916, with whom he had three sons. He was a member of the Barton, Australian Capital Territory, branch of the Returned and Services League. He died of tuberculosis at Canberra Community Hospital on 18 July 1957, aged 66.
