= Henry Alcock =

Henry Alcock may refer to:

- Henry Alcock (historian) (1886–1948), British historian and academic
- Henry Alcock (died 1812) (1717–1812), Irish politician
- Henry Alcock (1717–1784), MP for Waterford City, and for Clonmines

== See also ==
- Henry Allcock (1759–1808), judge and political figure in Upper and Lower Canada
