= Australian Eastern Mission =

1934 Australian diplomatic tour

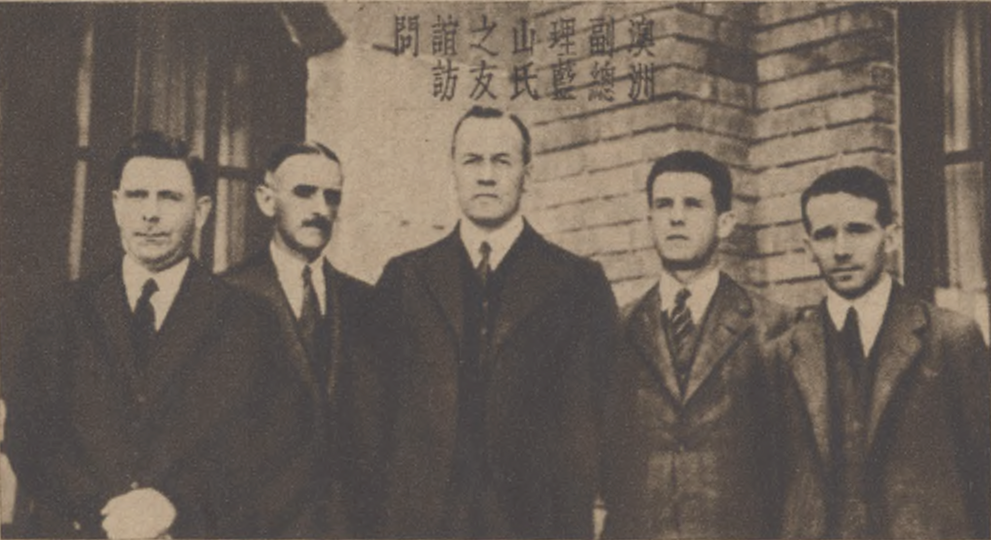
Members of the delegation in China: Arthur Moore (far left), Eric Longfield Lloyd (second from left), John Latham (centre), and two staff members

The Australian Eastern Mission (AEM) was a 1934 diplomatic tour of East and South-East Asia led by Australian deputy prime minister John Latham. The mission was the first such official tour sent by Australia outside of the British Empire and has been seen as a landmark in Australian foreign policy and engagement with Asia.

The mission was publicly framed as a goodwill tour, but had important commercial, diplomatic and strategic aims. It ran from 21 March to 14 June 1934 and concentrated on China, the Netherlands East Indies and Japan, with shorter visits to the British colonies of Hong Kong, Malaya, and Singapore and the American-administered Philippines. A major focus of the mission was Australian relations with Japan in the aftermath of the Manchurian Crisis. Latham's recommendations from the mission were influential on the Lyons government's trade and foreign policies in the lead-up to World War II, contributing to the expansion of the Department of External Affairs and the appointment of Australia's first diplomats in Asia later in the 1930s.

== Background ==
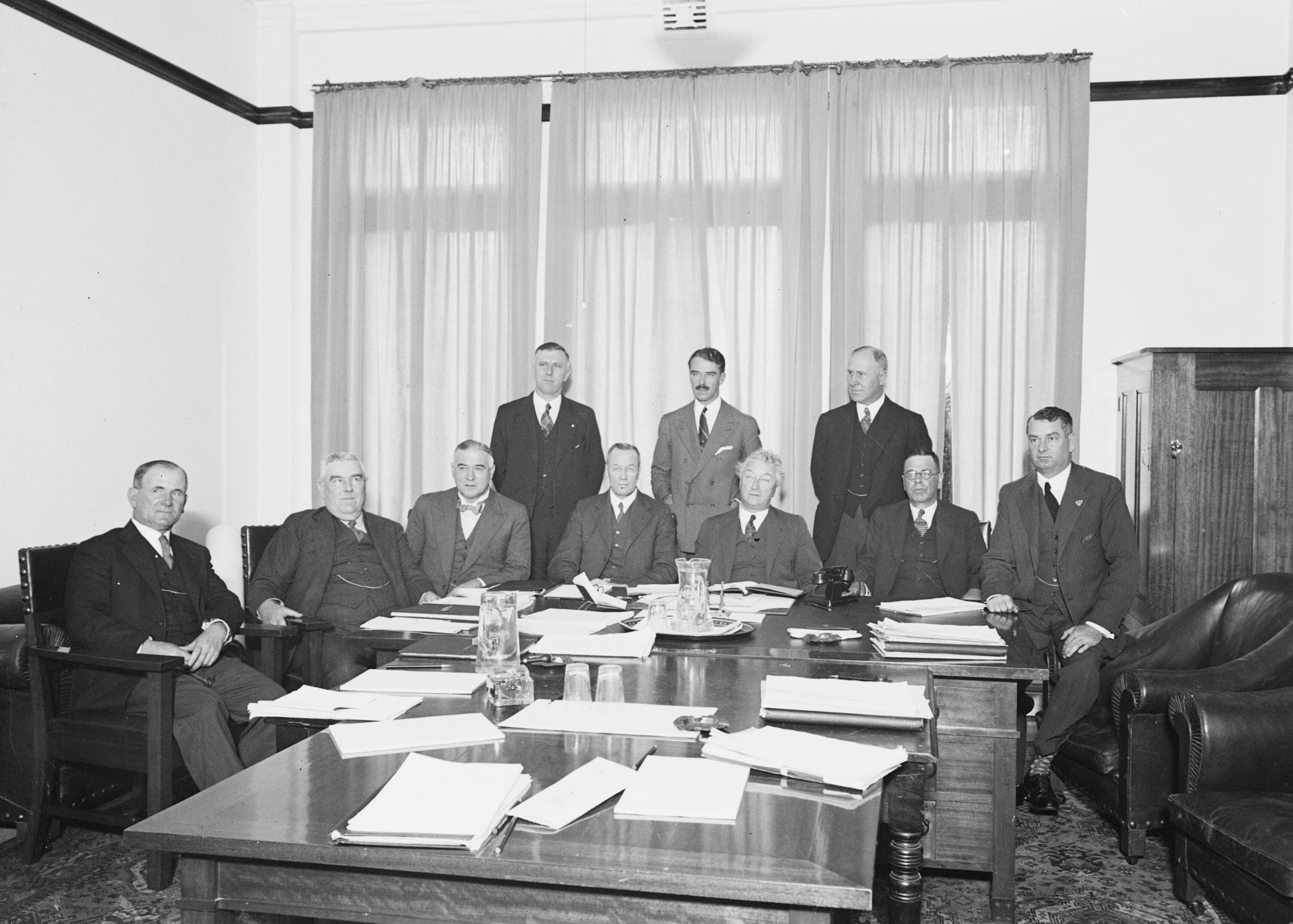
Members of the Lyons government meeting to farewell Latham in March 1934 (Latham and Lyons at centre)

In the early 1930s Australia had an extremely limited foreign policy apparatus, with the Department of External Affairs (DEA) functioning as an appendage of the Prime Minister's Department and sharing a departmental secretary. The country had no diplomatic service of its own, instead relying on British officials, and rarely deviated from the "imperial" foreign policy determined by the British government. A system of trade commissioners had been initiated in the early 1920s, but was largely disbanded following budget cuts during the Great Depression.

Joseph Lyons was appointed prime minister in 1932. His first years in office saw increasing concerns in Australia over regional security, in the wake of the Manchurian Crisis and Japan's withdrawal from the League of Nations. Japan had become Australia's second-largest trading partner, importing significant quantities of agricultural goods and other raw materials, but the trading relationship had experienced friction due to Australia's policy of high tariffs and the strong balance of trade in Australia's favour. The government's Trade Commissioners Act 1933 provided for the re-establishment of a trade commissioner service, but appointments were deferred pending further consideration of Australia's strategic goals.

During 1933, Lyons and his deputy John Latham – also minister for external affairs and attorney-general – collaborated in preparing "an initiative that would signal a change of pace and style in external policy". On 2 December 1933, following a press leak, Lyons announced that the government would send a mission with the aim of "promoting friendly relations with neighbouring countries in the East", observing that "it is a strange thing to reflect that no official visit has ever been paid by Australia to the countries of any of her near neighbours". The mission was formally approved by cabinet ten days later, with Latham announced as its leader in early 1934. Latham was likely the primary instigator of the mission and was influenced by the recommendations of H. W. Gepp and A. C. V. Melbourne, who had separately visited East Asia in 1932 and prepared reports recommending greater Australian engagement with the region.

== Aims ==
Lyons was keen to emphasise publicly that the mission would primarily be a goodwill tour of a diplomatic rather than commercial nature. He wrote to newspaper editors requesting that the term "trading mission" not be used and forbade government ministers from discussing the mission with the press. This was likely an attempt to discourage foreign governments – particularly Japan – from raising balance of trade issues. Bird (2008) has described the mission as intended as "a 'quasi-diplomatic' mission headed by a political quasi-diplomat, who would also devote due attention to defence considerations".

According to Schedvin (2008), "Japan was the focus of the mission's attention for both commercial and strategic reasons". Latham was privately tasked by Lyons with directly determining Japan's attitude to the League of Nations and "her terms for a final settlement of the Manchurian question". He also asked Latham to raise with Japan the issue of military activities – including naval surveys and construction of fortifications – in the South Seas Mandate, which had a maritime border with Australia's own mandate in the Territory of New Guinea. Outside of Japan, Latham was asked to examine "matters directly relevant to Australian security", particularly the development of the British naval base at Singapore in line with the Australian government's commitment to the Singapore strategy.

== Membership and itinerary ==
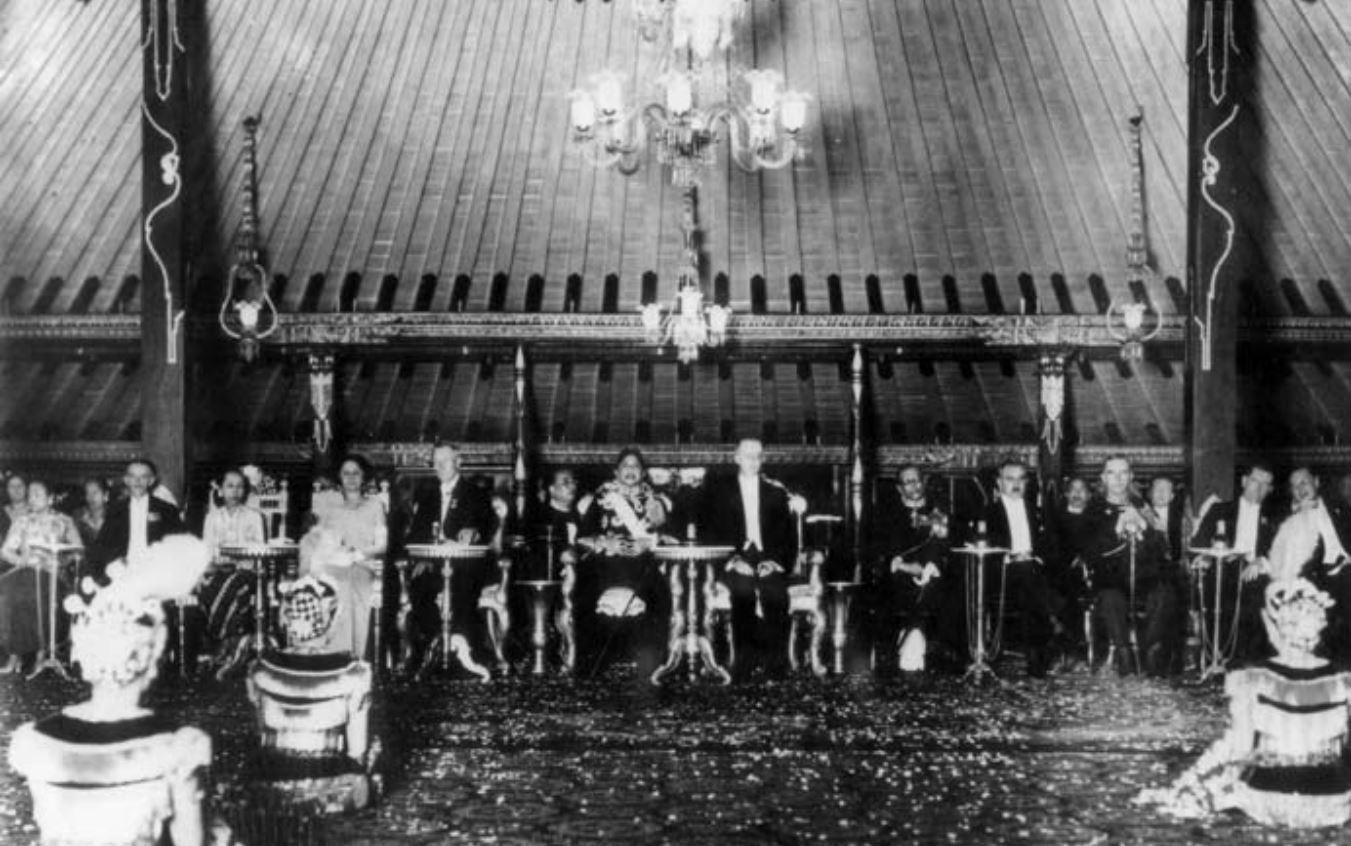
Latham being entertained at the Royal Palace of Yogyakarta by Sultan Hamengkubuwono VIII

The mission was led by Latham, who was accompanied by his wife Ella and their daughter. The other official members of the delegation were public servants Arthur Moore from the Department of Trade and Customs and Eric Longfield Lloyd from the Attorney-General's Department, as well as three secretarial staff members. The mission was also accompanied by journalists Frank Murray of the Daily Telegraph and Frederic Cutlack of the Sydney Morning Herald.

The mission left Sydney on 21 March 1934 and travelled upward through the Netherlands East Indies, the British colonies of Malaya and Singapore, French Indochina, British Hong Kong, the independent countries of China and Japan, and the American-administered Commonwealth of the Philippines. The mission returned to Australia on 14 June after 85 days overseas, of which 37 days were spent in transit. The vast majority of time was spent in the Netherlands East Indies (11 days), China (14 days) and Japan (12 days), with the other destinations "receiving only transitory attention which was often restricted to social engagements". The mission visited five cities in China and eleven cities in Japan. Although not an official member of the delegation, Cutlack also visited the Japanese puppet state of Manchoukuo and subsequently published a pamphlet supporting Japanese claims to the territory.

Latham's travels were largely facilitated by the British officials in the Foreign Office, owing to the lack of Australian representation in those countries. There was no prior consultation with the British government prior to Lyons' announcement of the mission, which apparently "caused some turmoil in the Foreign Office" as they learned of its creation through The Times. According to Bird (2008), Latham's description of the British attitude to the mission as "apprehensive" served as a good description of "Whitehall's general attitude towards dominion forays into international relations". There was some subsequent conflict between the Foreign Office and the DEA over the itinerary and matters of protocol, and also an unsuccessful attempt to have Latham chaperoned by the British ambassador to Japan, Francis Lindley.

=== Discussions and meetings ===
On the mission Latham "actively sought information about trading opportunities across Asia, entering into frequent and detailed discussions with prime ministers, foreign ministers, premiers and governors about Australia's trading and commercial interests, customs duties and tariffs". In Japan, Latham met with foreign minister Kōki Hirota on 12 May 1934, with the Japanese occupation of Manchuria and withdrawal from the League of Nations being the primary topics of discussion. Latham's encouragement for Japan to rejoin the League was rebuffed and Hirota made clear that de jure recognition of Manchoukuo would be a prerequisite for a Japanese return to internationalism. Bird (2008) has suggested that Latham was inexperienced in personal diplomacy, as evidenced by his willingness to make upfront concessions to Hirota.

The issue of the White Australia policy was raised with Latham on a number of occasions, although he apparently tried to avoid the matter. Australia's immigration policies were a major topic of discussion at Latham's meeting with Chinese foreign minister Wang Ching-wei, who asked for restrictions to be relaxed on the relatives of Australian-born Chinese. Latham committed to raising Wang's concerns with the Australian cabinet and later noted in his report that concessions on White Australia might assist in the development of trade with China and Japan.

== Aftermath ==
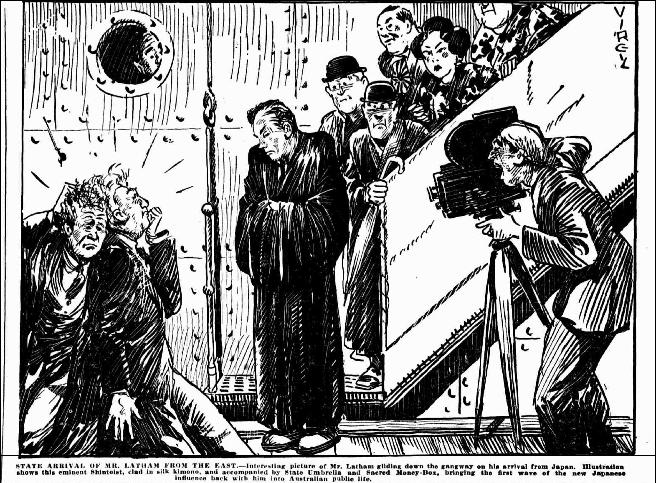
Contemporary cartoon by Virgil Reilly depicting Latham's return to Australia, published in Smith's Weekly

=== Reports and recommendations ===
Latham submitted an official report to parliament on 6 July 1934, a day after he had submitted his resignation as a cabinet minister to Lyons. In his speech to the House of Representatives he stated:

The continent of Australia is actually in the geographical area often described as "the East". The risks attendant upon any disturbance of the peace or actual outbreak of war in that region are of the great moment to our people. [...] Accordingly, the maintenance of friendly relations between Australia and our neighbours and, more generally, the maintenance of peace in the East, should be the major objective of Australian foreign policy.

Latham's official report brushed over the diplomatic and defence aspects of the mission, which were covered in a separate document titled "Secret Report on the International Position in the Far East" presented to Lyons. This concluded that the AEM had accomplished its missions of spreading goodwill and clarifying the Japanese position on Manchuria, but that it had failed to steer Japan back to internationalism. The secret report was highly critical of the state of the naval base at Singapore, which Latham described as "chaotic".

References to trade in Latham's official report were complemented by three confidential reports on trade that were authored by Moore and appended to the secret report. Latham strongly supported the expansion of the trade commissioner service, with particular priority to be given to China and the Dutch East Indies. He envisaged a key role for trade commissioners in Australian foreign policy; they would "bridge the information gulf that separated Australia from its northern neighbours" and "combine the roles of diplomat with the more specific task of trade development".

=== Contemporary reaction ===
The activities of the mission were widely reported in Australian newspapers. Latham's report was not debated in parliament, possibly due to the imminent announcement of the 1934 federal election. There was some contemporary criticism that the mission was merely a "farewell tour" for Latham, who was widely expected to retire from politics. Additionally, as many the key goals of the mission were not made public, outside observers felt that little activity was occurring. Latham did retire from politics later in 1934 and was succeeded as external affairs minister by George Pearce.

=== Legacy ===
The Eastern Mission was Australia's first diplomatic mission outside of the British Empire. According to Boris Schedvin's official history of Australia's trade commissioner service, it marked the "first serious attempt to develop a coherent policy towards Asia and marked a significant broadening of Australia’s foreign and trade policy". A 2008 parliamentary research paper on Australia–China relations concluded that the mission was "a turning point in the history of Australia's external relations where a more self-confident and assertive nation began to distinguish Australian from British interests".

Latham's assessment of Japan and visit to Singapore had "serious long-term ramifications for defence policymaking" in Australia. The criticisms of the state of the Singapore naval base reinforced Australian concerns that the British military could not be relied upon in the event of a wider conflict in the Pacific and contributed towards Lyons' commitment to rearmament throughout the remainder of the 1930s. However, Latham's assessment of the potential for Japanese expansion proved inaccurate, particularly his view that Japan would not seek to expand southward and his acceptance of Japanese assurances that they would not militarise the South Seas Mandate.

The mission has also been cited as influential in the government's decision in 1936 to establish the Department of External Affairs as fully independent from the Prime Minister's Department, with its own departmental secretary. In the short term, the mission did not immediately lead to the appointment of formal diplomatic representatives in Asian countries, with Australia continuing to be represented by British officials. Latham told The Shanghai Times that, while Australia maintained the right to appointment its own ambassadors, "both the interests of my country and our natural loyalty to Great Britain make it desirable that there should be unity in matters of major importance". However, the government quickly adopted Latham's recommendations on the role and location of trade commissioners, and by the late 1930s appointments had been made to China (1935), the Dutch East Indies (1935), Japan (1935), Egypt and the Middle East (1936), and India (1939). Latham was ultimately appointed as Australia's first Minister to Japan in 1940, a year before the attack on Pearl Harbor and Australia's consequent declaration of war on Japan.

== Sources ==
- Bird, David (2008). "The Genesis of Australian Appeasement – The 'Australian Eastern Mission' of 1934 and its Aftermath". J. A. Lyons, The Tame Tasmanian: Appeasement and Rearmament in Australia, 1932–39. Australian Scholarly Publishing. pp. 60–93. ISBN 9781740971577.
- Cuffe, Honae (2021). The Genesis of a Policy: Defining and Defending Australia's National Interest in the Asia-Pacific, 1921–57 (PDF). ANU Press. ISBN 9781760464684.
- Kendall, Timothy (2008). Within China's Orbit?: China Through the Eyes of the Australian Parliament (PDF). Department of Parliamentary Services, Parliament of Australia. ISBN 978-0975201589.
- Schedvin, Boris (2008). Emissaries of Trade: A History of the Australian Trade Commissioner Service (PDF). Department of Foreign Affairs and Trade. ISBN 978-1-921244-57-5.
