= Yooralla =

Non-profit disability services organisation in Australia

- Type: Charity
- Industry: Disability services
- Predecessor: Yooralla Hospital School (1918–1977); Vic Society Crippled Children (1935–1977)
- Founded: 1977
- Headquarters: Australia
- Revenue: 146,963,244 Australian dollar (2023)
- Total assets: 124,842,773 Australian dollar (2023)
- Number of employees: ~ 2100
- Website: www.yooralla.com.au

Yooralla (officially the Yooralla Society of Victoria) is a non-profit disability services organisation in Australia, supporting over 30,000 Victorians living with a disability.

== History ==
The Yooralla Society of Victoria was established in 1977 as a merger of the Yooralla Hospital School and the Victorian Society for Crippled Children.

=== Yooralla Hospital School (1918–1977) ===
In 1918, Evangeline Ireland established the Yooralla Free Kindergarten for Crippled Children, a school for disabled children. She was motivated by the discovery of a disabled child whose parents left her in a chicken coop while they were working. It was initially housed in Fitzroy, but after a few months relocated to Carlton, eventually finding a more-or-less permanent home on Pelham Street. During World War II, the school was evacuated to Mount Macedon. It eventually acquired several other properties.

=== Victorian Society for Crippled Children (1935–1977) ===
The Victorian Society for Crippled Children was established in 1935 by Eleanor Latham, the wife of Chief Justice Sir John Latham. It was closely tied to the Yooralla Hospital School and the Royal Children's Hospital. After World War II it was renamed the Victorian Society for Crippled Children and Adults. It operated a number of residential hostels for disabled people, as well as recreational facilities and training centres.

=== Sir Edgar and Lady Coles Kindergarten (1966–2018) ===
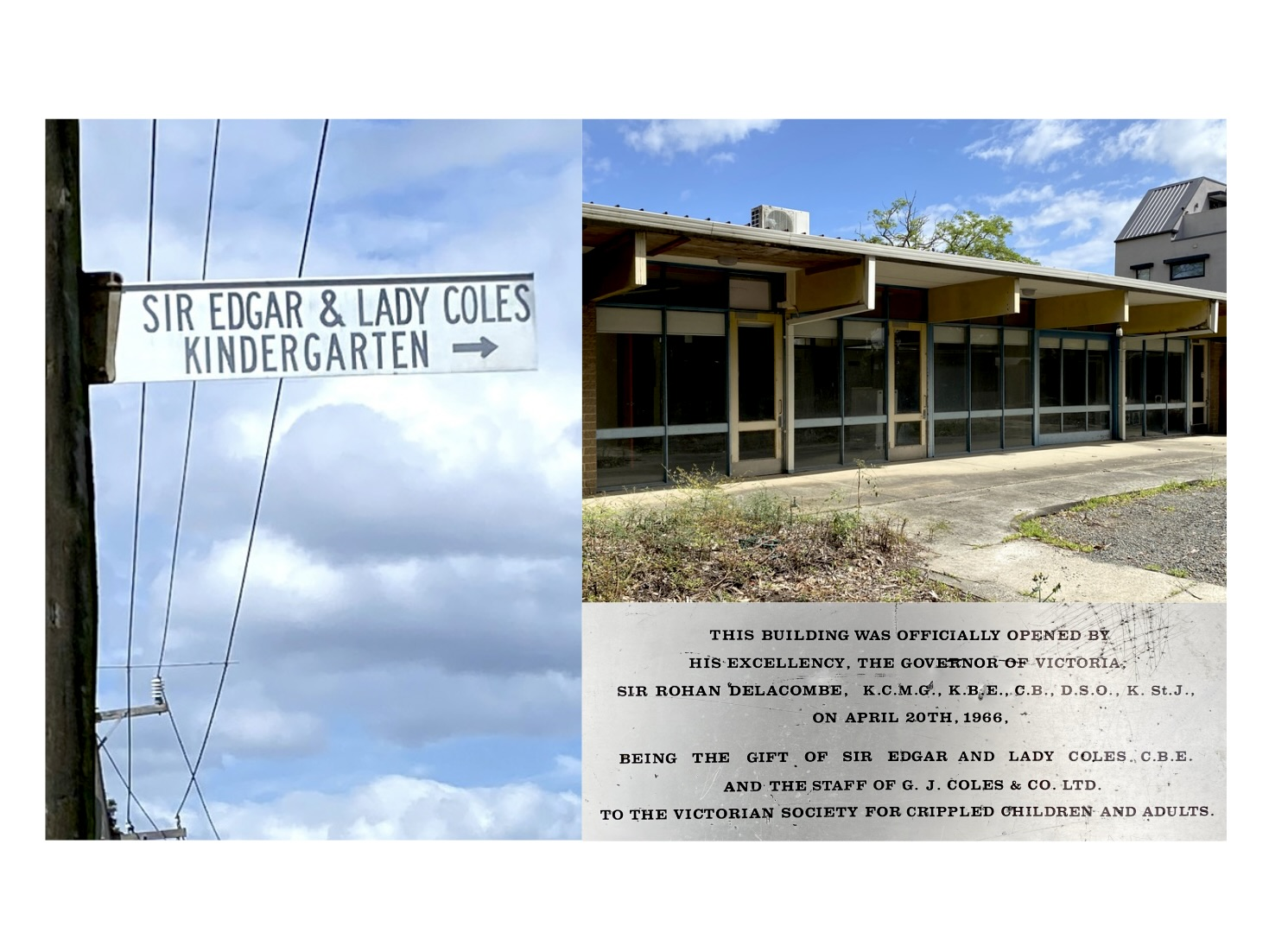
Kindergarten at Neil Court, Blackburn Sth

On 20 April 1966, Governor Rohan Delacombe opened a kindergarten for the society at Blackburn South. Thoughtfully designed for ease of access, it was named the Sir Edgar and Lady Coles Kindergarten after directors of the G. J. Coles retail chain – who donated $24,000 towards construction. The kindergarten formally closed in 2018, and the society's lease ended the following year. The land, which had been owned by the City of Nunawading (now Whitehorse) since 1962, and was declared surplus to community needs in 2022.

=== Abuse allegations (2014–) ===
In November 2014, the Napthine government and the Victorian opposition both pledged to hold an inquiry into the state disability sector in response to an investigation by Four Corners and Fairfax airing allegations that Yooralla failed to act on warnings about a carer who sexually assaulted vulnerable clients. Former National Disability Commissioner Graeme Innes has called for a national inquiry as the National Disability Insurance Scheme would expand the number of group homes for Australians with disabilities.

In February 2015, the Australian Senate committed to holding a national inquiry into the abuse of disabled people in institutions and homes across Australia.

From February to July 2015, KPMG conducted a review of Yooralla, on behalf of the Department of Health and Human Services (DHHS). The report found that Yooralla has systems and processes that are designed to ensure the delivery of quality and safe services for its clients. It was also found that Yooralla had made significant progress, including major enhancements to work practices.
