= Arthur Claude Moore =

Australian public servant and businessman

Arthur Moore CBE
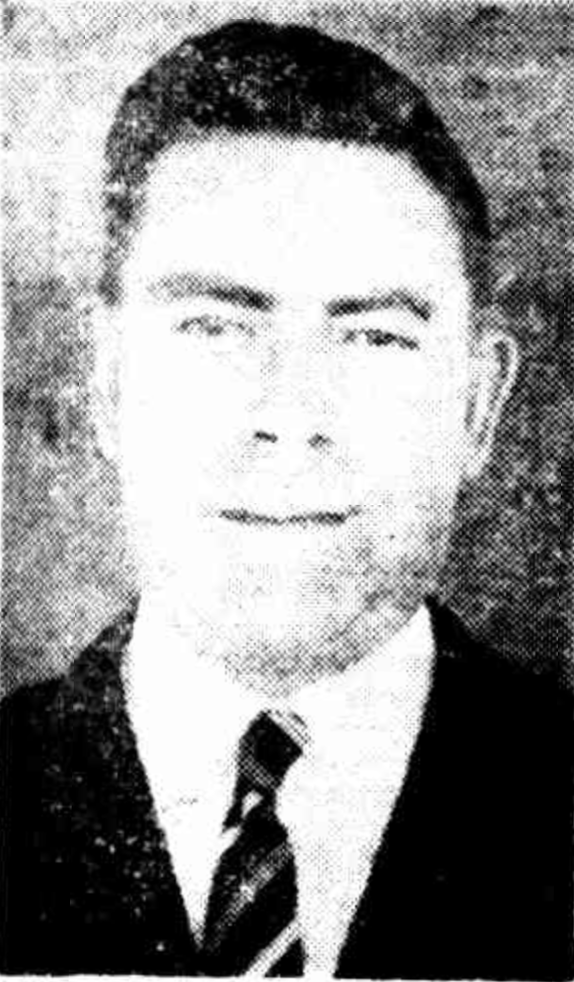
- Moore in 1944
- Born: Arthur Claude Moore; 1 March 1898; Strathbogie, Victoria, Australia
- Died: 4 October 1978 (aged 80); Darlinghurst, New South Wales, Australia
- Occupations: Public servant, businessman
- Spouses: Stella Hogan (m. 1925) Olga Badik (m. 1946)

Arthur Claude Moore CBE (1 March 1898 – 4 October 1978) was an Australian public servant and businessman. He was a senior figure in the Department of Trade and Customs in the 1930s and 1940s and accompanied many trade delegations. During World War II he was director of the department's division of import procurement. After resigning from the public service he ran a Coca-Cola bottling company.

== Early life ==
Moore was born on 1 March 1898 in Strathbogie, Victoria. He was the eighth child of Mary (née Davis) and Reuben Edward Moore. Following their mother's death, he and a sister were sent to Melbourne to be raised by a woman they knew as "Granny Andersen". Moore attended a state school in Moonee Ponds and subsequently found work as a junior clerk with Victorian Railways. In 1918 he enlisted in the Australian Imperial Force, serving in Turkey with the 7th Light Horse Regiment.

== Public service career ==
Moore joined the New South Wales branch of the Department of Trade and Customs in 1917, returning to work full time in 1919 following his discharge from the military. He moved back to Melbourne in 1924 and in the same year qualified as an accountant. He subsequently became one of the first public servants to move to Canberra, which replaced Melbourne as Australia's capital in 1927. Moore was part of the Australian delegation to the Ottawa Conference of 1932 and represented his department on the Australian Eastern Mission of 1934. He subsequently became the principal adviser to trade minister Henry Gullett, also accompanying Joseph Lyons and Earle Page on trade missions to London in 1935 and 1938 respectively. From 1935 he held the rank of assistant comptroller-general of customs. According to The Argus, he was "recognised as an outstanding authority on trade and manufacturing problems".

=== World War II ===
In September 1941, Moore was appointed by the Fadden government as director of the division of import procurement, a new section within the Department of Trade and Customs. He was responsible for the flow of essential goods and defence items into Australia, as well as administering the Lend-Lease program. During his tenure, he was reportedly responsible for procuring £550 million ($43.7 billion today) worth of goods through a combination of Lend-Lease, Mutual Aid, and standard purchasing. In 1944, he was sent to Washington, D.C., to replace Lewis Macgregor as director-general of war supplies procurement. He and trade minister Richard Keane opened negotiations for a settlement of Australia's obligations under Lend-Lease, which Moore completed on his own following Keane's sudden death in 1946. The final outcome allowed the federal government to purchase the remaining American goods in Australia for £27 million (equivalent to $2,143,000,000 in 2022).

== Business career ==
In June 1946, Moore returned to Australia and announced his resignation from the public service. While in the U.S. he had convinced The Coca-Cola Company to sell off its Sydney bottling operations to Australian investors. He was subsequently appointed chairman and managing director of Coca-Cola Bottlers (Sydney) Pty Ltd, a position he held until 1954. He also had commercial interests in a fertiliser plant at Chullora and a bauxite and dolomite mine at Mount Fairy.

== Personal life ==
Moore married Stella Hogan in 1925. The couple had three children, however two died in infancy. He was appointed Commander of the Order of the British Empire (CBE) in 1938. While in New York in 1946, Moore married Olga Badik, a Canadian, with whom he had another two children. Outside of his professional activities he served a term as president of the Wine and Food Society of New South Wales. He died on 4 October 1978 at St Vincent's Hospital, Sydney, aged 80.
