= Royal Historical Society of Queensland =

Organization

The Royal Historical Society of Queensland
- Founded: 1913
- Type: Historical society; state peak body; charitable organisation
- VAT ID no.: ABN: 34 217 251 028
- Registration no.: CH
- Location: "Commissariat Store", 115 William Street, Brisbane, Australia
- Region served: Queensland, Australia
- Website: www.queenslandhistory.org
- Formerly called: Historical Society of Queensland (1913–1959)

The Royal Historical Society of Queensland (RHSQ) is a historical society founded in Brisbane, Australia in 1913. It promotes the study of Australian history especially that of Queensland and adjacent Pacific islands. It maintains an important collection and catalogue of historical research materials and organises exhibitions of those materials. It organises meetings, lectures and conferences where research is presented and publishes these proceedings and other scholarly papers in its journal and other publications. It works with other historical societies and cultural organisations to advocate on behalf of the sector and to provide leadership and guidance.

The RHSQ is the Queensland constituent member of the Federation of Australian Historical Societies and the peak body for historical societies in Queensland.

== Commissariat Store ==
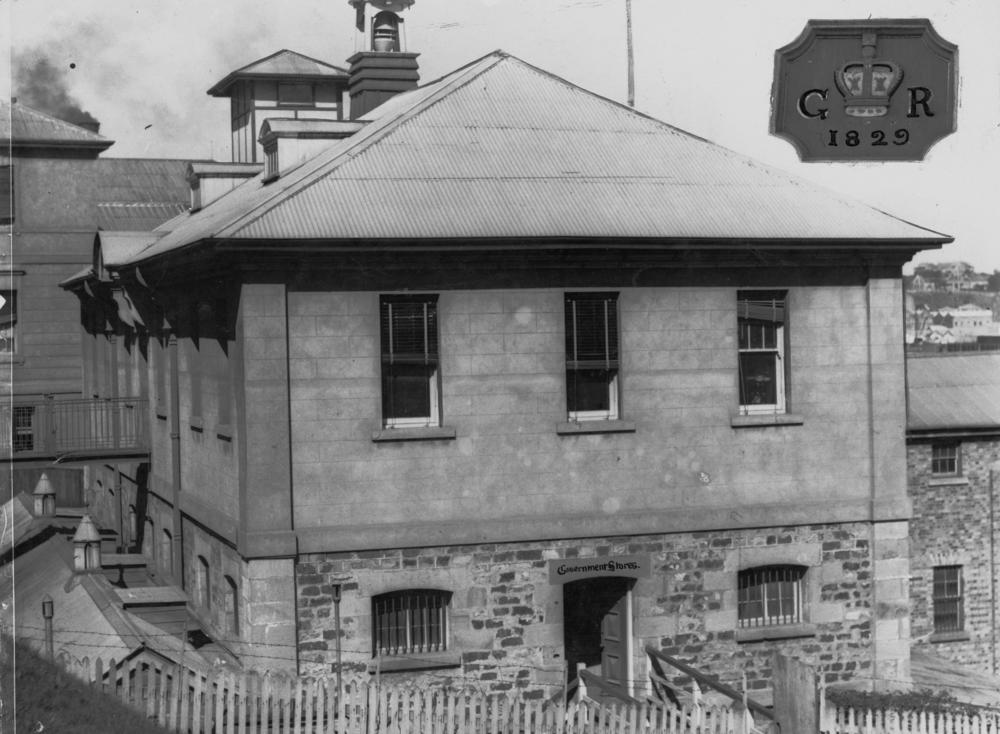
Former Commissariat Stores building

It maintains a resource centre at the "Commissariat Store", one of Brisbane's oldest buildings. Convict-built in 1829, it is one of only two buildings which survive from the Moreton Bay penal colony. The first two storeys were built using local stone and convict labour in 1828–9. A third storey was added in 1913 in rendered brick. It was used as a government store until 1960. Queensland State Archives used the ground floor until 1968 and the upper floors were occupied by various government departments until 1976. Occupation was then granted to the society and extensive renovations were done before it was opened in 1978 as the society's headquarters. In 1998, a conservation plan was prepared and work done to reverse or modify inappropriate changes made during the 1970s' renovations.

The building houses the RHSQ museum and the Welsby Library.

The building was badly damaged in the January 2011 flood and the society had to relocate temporarily.

=== Welsby Library ===
From its earliest days, the society began collecting books, manuscripts and periodicals; it also began a collection of photographs, maps, and press cutting books. Thomas Welsby was a foundation member of the society who served as a councillor, vice-president and president. During his life he donated many letters, newspaper cuttings, documents, scrap books, and copies of his published books and in his will he made a bequest of his library of more than 2,000 volumes. The society's library was amalgamated with the Welsby collection and was opened as the Welsby Library on 15 March 1947 in Newstead House. The Welsby Library is now housed on the second floor of the Commissariat Store.

== History ==
The Australian Historical Society was formed in Sydney in 1901 and the Historical Society of Victoria in 1909. In Queensland, a provisional committee was formed with a view to furnishing Queensland with a similar society: a constitution was drafted, prospective members enrolled (limited to 100) and the Governor approached to be patron. In August 1913 the inaugural meeting of the Historical Society of Queensland, chaired by the Governor, Sir William MacGregor, was held at the Albert Hall: a paper, "Methods of Historical Research with special reference to Australia", was read by its author and one of the moving spirits behind the formation of the Society, the constitution was adopted and officers and committee elected.

Foundation members included:

- Henry Alcock, lecturer and later professor of history at the University of Queensland
- Frank Cumbrae-Stewart, foundation registrar, librarian and professor of law at the University of Queensland
- William McGregor, Queensland Governor
- Alexander Melbourne, lecturer and later associate professor of history at the University of Queensland

== Publications ==
The Society publishes a quarterly journal, a monthly bulletin and other publications.

Queensland History Journal
- Discipline: History of Queensland
- Language: English

Publication details
- Former names: Journal, Historical Papers
- History: 1914–present
- Publisher: Royal Historical Society of Queensland (Australia)
- Frequency: Quarterly

Standard abbreviations
- ISO 4: Qld. Hist. J.

Indexing
- ISSN: 1447-1345 (print); 1836-5477 (web)
- OCLC no.: 13392610

Links
- Journal homepage

=== Queensland History Journal ===
In 1914, the Society began publishing a Journal, later known as the Journal of the Royal Historical Society of Queensland , which today appears quarterly as the Queensland History Journal in print and online. As the Society languished in the late 1920s and into the 1930s, the journal was not published from 1929 to 1936. From 1974 to 1984 it was published under the name Historical Papers. In 1986, it began publishing every three months. It obtained its current name in November, 2008.

=== Bulletin ===
In 1942, the society began publishing a bulletin (ISSN 0035-8916) ten times a year (monthly except January and December).

== Fellowship and the MacGregor Medal ==
On the occasion of the Golden Jubilee of the society in 1963, the society established a Fellowship as an award for those who contributed to the knowledge and scholarship of Queensland history. The award entitles the fellow to the post-nominals "FRHistSQ".

In 1999, the society began awarding the Sir William MacGregor Medal for exceptional and outstanding service in the promotion of Queensland history. The medal is named in honour of the first patron of the society.

== Kerr Medal ==
The society has established a joint committee with the Professional Historians Association (Queensland) to award an annual John Douglas Kerr Medal for Distinction in historiography, historical research and writing since 2005. The medal honours John Douglas Kerr (1942 – 2003), a CSIRO statistician, railways enthusiast and historian who joined the society in 1967. He served as a councillor, editor of the Journal (from 1985) and the honorary librarian.

== Clem Lack Oration ==
In 1973, the society inaugurated an annual oration named in honour of Clem Lack. Clem Llewellyn Lack (1900–1972) was a longterm member (1949–1972) of the Society who served as a councillor and editor of publications. He was made a fellow in 1962. With Sir Raphael Cilento, the Society's president, he compiled a history for the Queensland centenary, Triumph in the Tropics (1959), and edited Queensland, Daughter of the Sun (1959) for the centenary of responsible government in Queensland. He contributed many articles to the society's journal.

== See also ==
- History of Queensland
