= Commonwealth Police =

Australian federal law enforcement (1917–1979)

- Abbreviation: COMPOL

Agency overview
- Formed: 1–2 December 1917
- Superseding agency: Australian Federal Police (AFP)

Jurisdictional structure
- Operations jurisdiction: Australia
- Legal jurisdiction: Australia
- Governing body: Attorney-General's Department
- Constituting instrument: War Precautions Act 1914 (repealed 1919–20) (Note: Was established under the act.) • Public Service Act 1902 • Peace Officers Act 1925

Operational structure
- Elected officer responsible: See ministers, Attorney-General

The Commonwealth Police (COMPOL) was the federal law enforcement agency in Australia between 1917 and 1979. A federal police force was first established in 1917, and operated under different names and in some periods as multiple organisations. In late 1979, the Commonwealth Police and Australian Capital Territory Police were merged to form the Australian Federal Police (AFP).

== Commonwealth Police Force (1917–1919) ==
Initially, after the six British colonies in Australia federated in 1901, there was no police agency to enforce federal (Commonwealth) laws. Instead, the various state police forces were called upon by the Commonwealth as required.

During the latter stages of World War I, there was considerable tension within Australian society, particularly over the issue of introducing military conscription. On 29 November 1917, at a public rally over this issue in the rural Queensland township of Warwick, an egg was thrown at Australian Prime Minister Billy Hughes. The offender was charged under Queensland state law, whereas Hughes wanted a Commonwealth charge preferred. The incident, and the perceived lack of action on the part of the Queensland Police, was the last straw for Hughes, who had spent months arguing and fighting with the government of Queensland, led by its anti-conscriptionist Premier T. J. Ryan, over a range of issues. Hughes doubted the loyalty of several prominent Queensland politicians and public servants, and felt that it was necessary to create a Commonwealth Police Force to ensure that Commonwealth law was adhered to in what he regarded as a "rogue" state.

Under the War Precautions Act 1914, Hughes quickly created a plain-clothed police force, which commenced operations in mid-December 1917. Hughes claimed Australia was at risk from possible revolt or similar action by organisations associated with either Irish nationalism, left wing and anti-war activities, such as Sinn Féin and the Industrial Workers of the World. At its peak the Commonwealth Police Force numbered about 50 men, almost all of whom were based in Queensland, despite the force notionally being a national one. Commonwealth Police had full police powers for federal offences, but their main task was to report on subversive activities of those opposed to the war and/or the Commonwealth government. Tensions between the Queensland and federal governments flared up a number of times, including during and after a federal police raid on the Queensland Government Printer's Office.

== The Investigations Branch and the Commonwealth Police (1919–1941) ==
After World War I ended, the Government began to wind the force down. In 1919 it was formally disbanded and the few remaining officers at this time were merged with the remnants of the military's Special Intelligence Bureau to form the Investigation Branch, which was later known as the Commonwealth Investigations Branch (CIB). Like the Commonwealth Police Force, the CIB was administered by the Commonwealth's Attorney-General's Department.

CIB had offices located in most of the states' capital cities. The agency, which never had more than about 100 staff, had two roles. The first role was to investigate offences against Commonwealth laws and to better coordinate the investigative capacity of the various Commonwealth Departments. The second role was to conduct special intelligence investigations and mount surveillance on any left-wing groups the Government felt to be subversive of national security.

The Commissioner of the Commonwealth Police Force from 1917 to 1919 was William Anderson, a former Inspector in the New South Wales Police.

Major H. E. (Harold) Jones replaced Anderson just before the Commonwealth Police was formally disbanded. Jones became the head of the Special Intelligence Bureau and led the Investigation Branch; among the hallmarks of his time in office was a single-minded focus on suppressing left-wing groups of any sort, ranging from trade unions to the nascent Communist Party of Australia.

The Federal Capital Territory Police, also known as the Commonwealth Police (and the Australian Capital Territory Police), was also led by Jones from its establishment on 28 September 1927.

During World War II the CIB's special intelligence functions were largely handed over to the Commonwealth Security Service (CSS).

=== Security Service of the Commonwealth Investigation Branch ===
When Jones retired, in 1943, he is said to have refused to hand over codes given to him by MI5, and sent a secret report on CIB's activities to the head of MI5, Sir David Petrie. In a letter (dated 31 December 1943), Jones told Petrie: "The Government having decided that my retirement should take place at the end of the present year, I am sending you a brief review of the work of the Security Section, which I have had the especial honour of controlling, particularly as your representative, for the past 27 years."

Jones' letter and report (headed A brief review of the world of the Security Service of the Commonwealth Investigation Branch) to Petrie, stated, among other things, that:

- CIB had been created, at the end of the First World War, to coordinate the records of Australian Army Intelligence and the Deputy Chief Censor (Australia) (a wartime military post answerable to the British Chief Censor rather than Australian civilian censors), and other records relating to war-time activities.
- Jones had directed the Special Intelligence Bureau towards the following purposes:
  - a Commonwealth instrumentality entirely independent of the States to deal with claims and other matters arising out of the War, and to provide Federal Investigation Services for the investigation of offences against the Commonwealth and;
  - to continue under cover of the Investigation Branch the then Special Intelligence Bureau-subsequently General Security.
- The Security Service of the branch was concerned with the protection of the "Commonwealth [Australia] and the [British] Empire". Jones then gave a history of the Security Service which was mostly concerned with watching the activities of dissidents in the community, especially aliens and potential enemy aliens. There were a number of references to the Australian Italian community and Fascistii organisations within these communities. There were also references to Balkan migrants maintaining links with national groups back home and causing trouble in immigration communities, especially those from countries that had been part of the former Ottoman (Turkish) Empire. "These elements in the former Turkish areas were always at each others' throats, each group aiming to liberate its sphere of influence from the Turkish yoke,' wrote Jones.
- During 1931, Jones continued, "the public began to show signs of uneasiness over the growth of Communism and Fascism in Australia." Jones said the most famous of the fascist organizations were the New Guard in New South Wales, the League of National Safety ("White Army") in Victoria, the Citizens' League of South Australia and the "Black Shirts" in Western Australia (possibly the Australia First Movement and/or local sympathisers of the British Union of Fascists, the Imperial League of Fascists, or the Italian MVSN). Jones said that the Branch was actively engaged in cutting off funds and arranging the disbandment of these" ill-advised bodies." Jones said that the Branch had long monitored the activities of the Nazi Germany in Australia. Late in 1933 the Branch established that a German, Dr Becker, then resident in Tanunda, was in charge of Nazi propaganda in Australia. The Security Section within the branch produced "comprehensive" reports on the Italian Fascists and German Nazi movements in Australia in 1936 and 1937 respectively.
- CIB had also maintained a watch of tourists and businessmen from the Empire of Japan. The Branch reported that the Japanese Consul-General, Wakamatsu, had established a Japanese espionage service in Australia.
- The "Security Service" (the British MI5) had conducted secret work within Jones's organisation, and this had given Jones "considerable pleasure". Colonel Jones talks about a Security Guard which was formed in 1935 and during the war was being used to guard Commonwealth establishments, especially munitions factories. Colonel Jones said there were some 3,000 members in the uniformed service of the Security Guard.
- There was considerable criticism directed at the Branch by "certain Army officers" and there were unsuccessful attempts to place his operation under the control of the Army. Colonel Jones described Military Intelligence as a "society of Friends and Relations" and that few of the officers were experienced in security work.
- A British intelligence officer, Lieutenant Colonel J.C. (Charles) Mawhood, who had sent from London in 1940 to help with security matters and stay-behind units (to work behind enemy lines in the event of invasion) was, according to Jones, given the run around by the Army. Senior officers claimed that Mawhood was a fraud. Jones writes: "Lt. Colonel Mawhood may have given vent to his feelings of disgust when faced with this campaign of intrigue and falsehood. If so, it is not to be wondered at. For such a state of affairs to be possible in any Security organisation is incomprehensible to me, and I can only say, as a loyal supporter and representative of your service for so many years, that I am disgusted with the unfair tactics introduced and the treatment meted out to an officer with your credentials." In a reply to Jones, Petrie concludes by saying: "I should like again to express my deep appreciation for the very valuable services which you have rendered and to wish you good fortune and a long and happy retirement."
- There had been a misunderstanding between Jones and the Director General of Security (DG), Brigadier Simpson and himself over the use of cyphers. Jones says in his letter that when the CSS was formed the then DG W. J. Mackay (a former NSW police commissioner) had requested that Jones should hand over all cyphers and secret documents. Jones refused to recognise Mackay's authority. Jones referred the matter to the Attorney General, Dr H. V. Evatt, who decided that the codes, the personal codes of Sir David Petrie, should remain in Jones' custody. Jones was given the responsibility of handling all overseas security cables and passing them on to the CSS when appropriate. When Mackay was replaced by Simpson, Simpson repeated the request for the codes. Evatt maintained his earlier ruling. While Jones was away from his office there was a report that Jones had refused to give Simpson decoded messages sent for him by London. The Solicitor General gave instructions to Jones' deputy to release the information to Simpson.
- Jones was upset by what he saw a slur on his integrity and hotly denied that he had refused to pass on decoded messages for Simpson. He writes to Petrie: "I must, say, however, that after 23 years of continuous service as your correspondent, I felt then, and still feel, that there was an apparent lack of confidence to be inferred from the action taken at your end by communicating on such matters through an irregular channel, particularly in view of my cablegram to you advising you of the official position as defined by Government and not the position as was apparently advised to you without authority. "

Jones was succeeded as the head of the federal police organisation by Eric Longfield Lloyd.

=== Peace Officer Guard ===
The Peace Officer Guard (POG) was established in 1925 to provide physical security at major and critical government locations. By the 1940s the POG consisted of several hundred uniformed personnel.

For administrative reasons, the head of the Commonwealth Investigation Service (CIS) was also automatically in charge of the POG, with the title Superintending Peace Officer. Other senior CIS officers also occupied senior POG positions in an ex-officio capacity.

== Commonwealth Investigation Service (1941–1960) ==
Following the war's end the CSS and CIB were consolidated into the Commonwealth Investigation Service [CIS].

In 1949, the Australian Government, at the insistence of British and US authorities, established the Australian Security Intelligence Organisation (ASIO) and transferred the counter-espionage and associated roles from the CIS to ASIO. This left the CIS to focus on the more traditional investigation duties.

Ray Whitrod, a former Detective Senior Constable in the South Australia Police and early member of ASIO, succeeded Longfield Lloyd as head of CIS and the Peace Officer Guard in 1953.

== Commonwealth Police (1960–1979) ==
By the early 1950s the Commonwealth Investigation Service was run-down and largely ineffective: It had lost a lot of its quality staff to Australian Security Intelligence Organisation; resources were limited; and its role was in reality poorly defined. The Peace Officer Guard was in a similar position. In 1957 the Commonwealth Government acted to address the situation and passed the Commonwealth Police Act. This led, in 1960, to the formal merger of the CIS and the POG into the Commonwealth Police (unofficially known as COMPOL). Over the course of the next two decades the Commonwealth Police expanded its roles and capabilities. In addition to increasing the numbers of detectives (to investigate crimes such as money laundering, damage to and theft of Commonwealth property), the Commonwealth Police developed forensic, training and administrative services for the Commonwealth and to assist state police agencies. Commonwealth Police assumed responsibilities for policing Norfolk Island and Christmas Island, established intelligence liaison posts overseas, and conducted uniformed policing duties at the nation's main airports. In 1964, Commonwealth Police (including a number of state police sworn in as special COMPOL members) deployed to Cyprus as part of the United Nations Peacekeeping Force in Cyprus. In addition to providing physical security at many key government locations, the Commonwealth Police also took on a greater role in providing close personal protection to senior politicians and diplomats.

Ray Whitrod remained Commissioner of the Commonwealth Police until 1969. After Whitrod left in 1969 to head the Royal Papua & New Guinea Constabulary (as it was then known), Commissioner Jack Davis led the Commonwealth Police.

In early 1975 the then Labor government moved to merge the Commonwealth Police with the other federally funded agencies, the Australian Capital Territory Police and Northern Territory Police. The new agency was to be called the Australia Police. Planning was well advanced when the proposal was abandoned in late 1975.

Following the 1978 terrorist bombing of the Hilton Hotel in Sydney, a review of Commonwealth law enforcement arrangements strongly urged the creation of a single federal police force. On 29 October 1979, the Commonwealth Police and ACT Police were merged to form the Australian Federal Police (AFP).

== See also ==
Other Australia law agencies:

- Australian Federal Police
- ACT Police
- New South Wales Police
- Northern Territory Police
- Queensland Police
- South Australia Police
- Tasmania Police
- Victoria Police
- Western Australia Police
