= 1948 Queensland railway strike =

Nine week strike over worker's wages

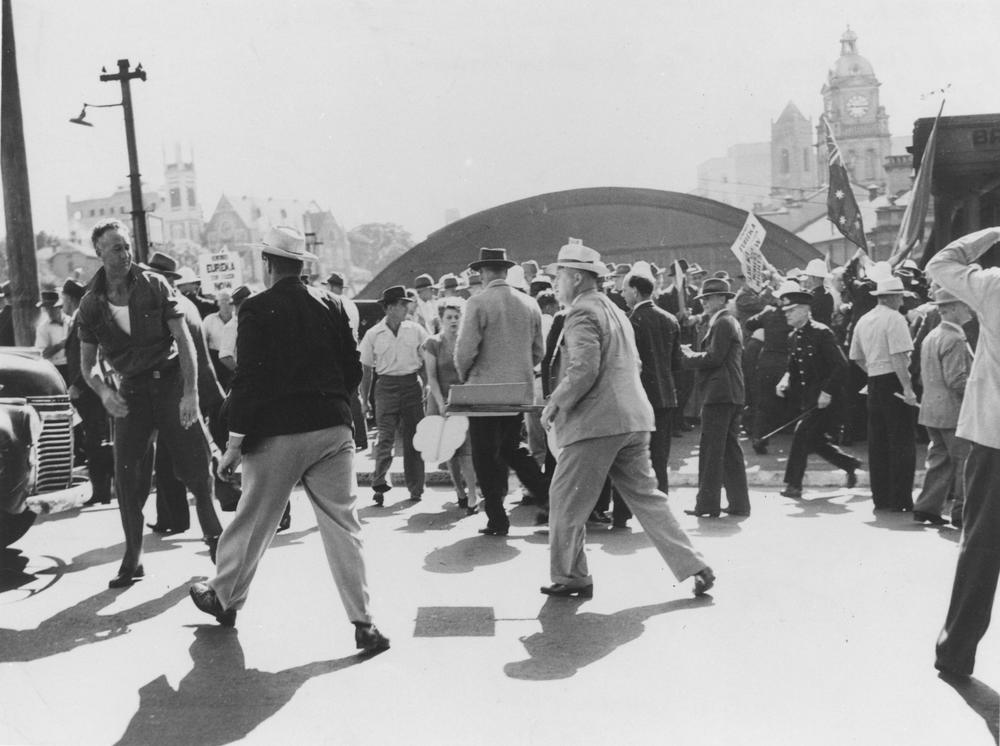
Confrontation with police during demonstration in support of the strike, Brisbane, 17 March 1948

The 1948 Queensland railway strike was a strike which lasted nine weeks, from 3 February to 5 April 1948, over wages of workers at railway workshops and locomotive depots in Queensland, Australia.

As head of the Commonwealth Security Service in Queensland, Bob Wake played an active role in watching the activities of the Communist Party of Australia during the strike.

== Background and causes of the strike ==
The main reason for the strike was the failure of the state Arbitration Court to hear claims the relevant unions lodged the previous year. In these claims the unions sought wages comparable to those covering railway workers in other states. The unions were also unhappy about the Court's apparent delay in hearing their further claim regarding weekend penalty rates, a claim which was linked to the 40-hour week campaign.

The demands of World War II left Queensland's railways rundown and badly in need of maintenance, but there was a shortage of materials and skilled workers to deal with the demand. Furthermore, because the Railways Department was unable to pay a competitive wage, they could not attract the number of workers they needed. Eventually, the department contracted some of the work out to private firms, but this further insulted the unions and railway workers because the tradesmen employed by these private firms were being paid more than the department's own employees.

These issues were inflamed by other issues Queensland was facing at the time: clothing, petrol and meat were still being rationed, while a severe drought had led to meat and milk shortages in Brisbane and a reduced sugar cane harvest in the North. In March 1947, the Commonwealth statistician reported that more than half the country's unemployed were in Queensland, and that this number was rising.

Amid this background, workshop and running shed tradesmen employed by the Queensland Railways Department officially stopped work at one minute past midnight on Tuesday 3 February 1948.

== "St Patrick's Day Bash" ==
On 9 Mar 1948, the Queensland Parliament, led by Premier Ned Hanlon, passed the Industrial Law Amendment Act of 1948, which gave police extraordinary powers to arrest without warrant and enter any home without cause. The bill, described as "one of the most drastic bills ever brought before an Australian parliament", was aimed at preventing picketing and ending the railway strike.

On St Patrick's Day (17 Mar), in response to the passing of this legislation, a group of men and women carrying banners, placards and a fake coffin proceeded down Edward St from Trades Hall towards Central Street Station in order to protest the law. Police soon closed in on the demonstrators, tore the placards from their grasp and attacked them with batons. Five men were arrested and two were hospitalized. One of the men who was hospitalized was Fred Paterson, Queensland Member of the Legislative Assembly for the seat of Bowen. Patterson's injuries included scalp lacerations, brain damage, concussion and shock. The incident was later known as the "St Patrick's Day Bash".

In the following days there was mass protest over the incident with thousands of union sympathizers gathering in King George Square, with other demonstrations held around the country.

In June of that year, the so-called "Picket Law" was repealed.

== End of strike and repercussions ==
On 1 April, following seven and a half hours of discussion, the Central Railway Disputes Committee recommended workers accept a wage rise of 12s.4d. a week, with proportionate increases for unskilled and semi-skilled workers. While this was less than the unions had originally requested, it was substantially more than the department had originally offered. Following the recommendation of the committee, the railwaymen accepted the government's offer, and the rail strike finally ended at midnight on 5 April 1948.

Queensland paid a heavy economic toll for the work stoppage, with estimates it cost the state up to £20 million.

The strike had a long-lasting impact on the Queensland labour movement, generating friction in the union ranks and exposing the struggle between the Communist Party of Australia and Queensland Labor for years to come.
