= Commonwealth Security Services =

The Commonwealth Security Service (CSS) was a precursor to the Commonwealth Police of Australia.

Operational in the 1930s and 1940s, it merged with the Commonwealth Investigation Branch in 1946 to form the Commonwealth Investigation Service (CIS). The CSS monitored events and organizations deemed problematic by the government, including the 1948 Queensland railway strike

== See also ==
- Commonwealth Police
