= Ella Latham =

Australian charity worker and hospital administrator

Ella Latham CBE
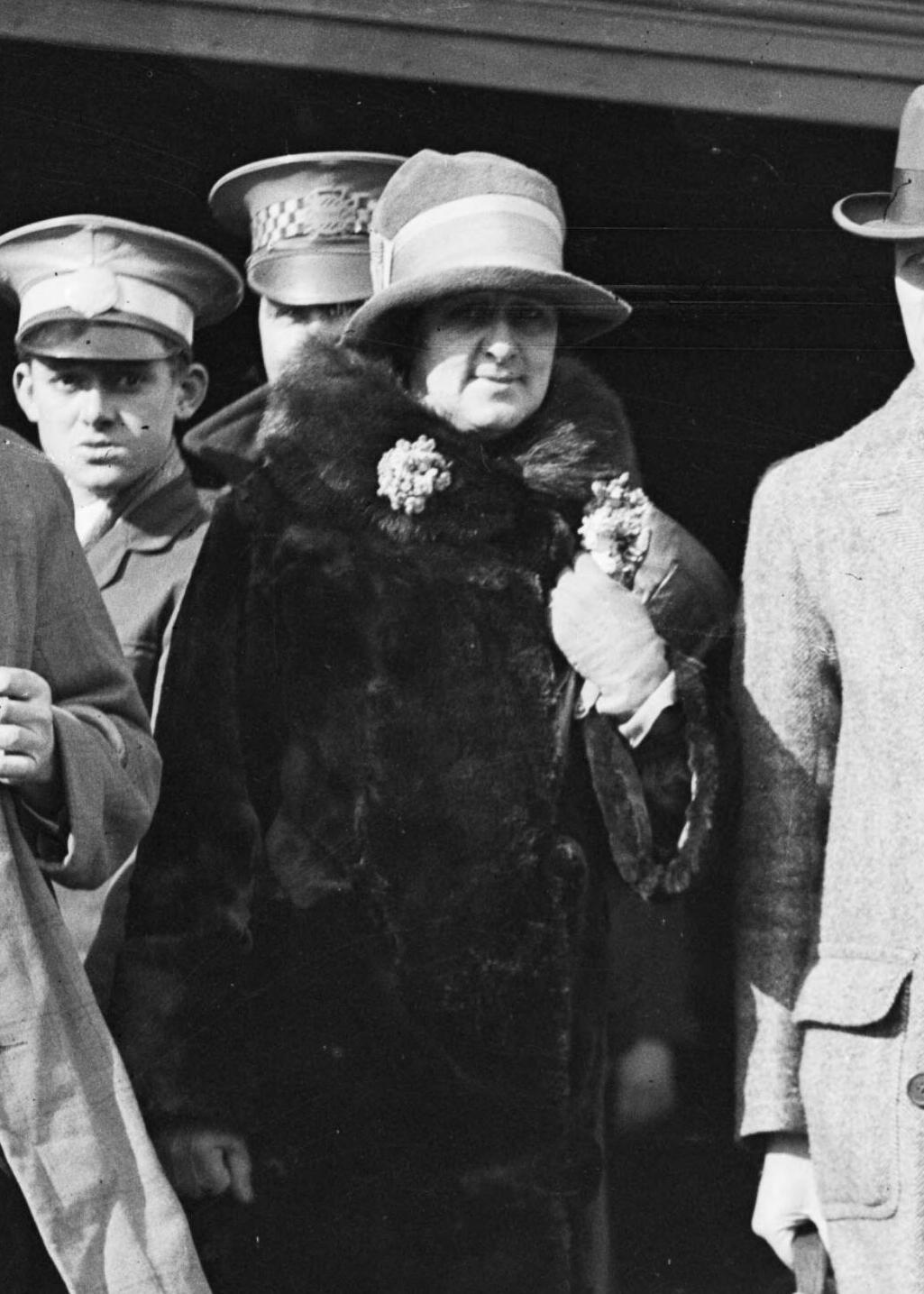
- Latham in 1927
- Born: Eleanor Mary Tobin; 10 October 1878; Northcote, Victoria, Australia
- Died: 26 March 1964 (aged 85); Melbourne, Victoria, Australia
- Education: University of Melbourne
- Occupation: Hospital president
- Spouse: John Latham (m. 1907)

Eleanor Mary Latham CBE (née Tobin; 10 October 1878 – 26 March 1964) was an Australian charity worker and hospital administrator. She served as president of the Royal Children's Hospital in Melbourne from 1933 to 1954.

== Early life ==
Latham was born on 10 October 1878 in Northcote, Victoria. She was the only child of schoolteachers Fanny Louisa (née Matthews) and Richard Tobin, who lived along Merri Creek. Her father authored the petition for the creation of the Borough of Northcote in 1883.

Latham attended the University High School, Melbourne, and went on to graduate with a Bachelor of Arts from the University of Melbourne in 1904. The following year she and her friend Jessie Webb published a poetry anthology titled Phases of Literature from Pope to Browning: Prose and Verse Selections. After graduation she worked as a schoolteacher until her marriage in 1907, when she was required to resign in accordance with the marriage bar in place at the time.

== Public life ==
Latham had a long-standing involvement with Melbourne's Royal Children's Hospital (RCH). She joined a suburban auxiliary (volunteer group) in 1923 and in 1926 was appointed to the hospital's management committee. She served as president of the committee from 1933 to 1954, resigning after grooming Elisabeth Murdoch as her successor. She was appointed Commander of the Order of the British Empire (CBE) in the same year. She was posthumously inducted onto the Victorian Honour Roll of Women in 2001.

Along with medical director Vernon Collins and lady superintendent Lucy de Neeve, Latham oversaw the transformation of RCH from "a charity hospital to an institution that provided medical services of the highest quality, education and training facilities for staff, a research organization in both curative and preventive medicine, and a link with the university". In 1946 she launched an appeal for a complete rebuild of the hospital closer to existing medical research institutions, which eventuated in 1963 with the hospital's move to Parkville. One of her innovations was the introduction of an independent medical advisory board to advise the committee on appointments of senior medical staff.

Latham had a particular interest in paediatric orthopaedics and in 1935 co-founded the Victorian Society for Crippled Children (now part of Yooralla). She helped establish a rehabilitation centre for disabled children at Frankston, including a "craft hostel" providing training in carpentry and home economics. After World War II she conducted a study tour of orthopaedic hospitals in the United Kingdom.

Latham was a founding member of Melbourne's Lyceum Club in 1912 and later served as president from 1925 to 1926. She also served on the national committee of the Australian Red Cross, serving as the delegate for the territorial divisions of New Guinea, Norfolk Island, the Northern Territory, and Papua.

== Personal life ==
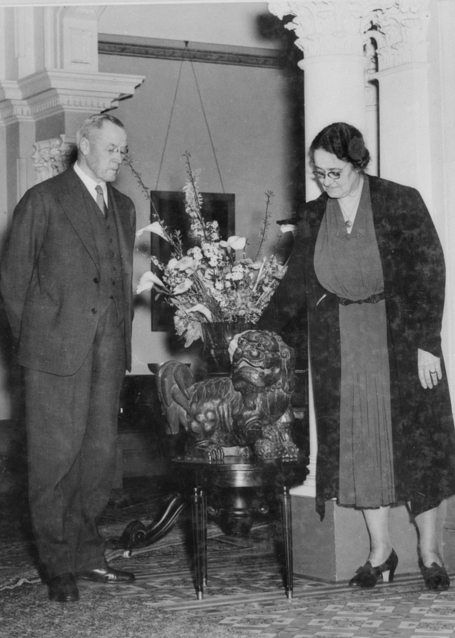
Latham and her husband in Melbourne in 1940

Latham married John Greig Latham in 1907, with whom she had three children. The couple were predeceased by their daughter Freda, who died from complications of diabetes, and older son Richard, who was killed in World War II.

Latham died on 26 March 1964, aged 85. Her husband died a few months later.
