= Henry Alcock (historian) =

British historian and academic

Henry Alcock (14 October 1886 – 26 April 1948) was a British historian and academic. He was the first professor of modern history at the University of Queensland and a founding member of the Historical Society of Queensland.

== Early life ==
Alcock was born in Bath, England in 1888. He attended King Edward VI's school, Bath and Magdalen College, Oxford, graduating with his B.A. with first class honours in modern history in 1908. He took his M.A. in 1911.

== Career ==
Alcock pursued a teaching career, teaching at Tettenhall College, Staffordshire before becoming senior house master at Kendall Grammar School for two years. He moved to Australia where he took up a position as a history and economics lecturer at the newly established University of Queensland in 1912. He became a McCaughey Professor of history in 1922, and later dean of the Faculty of Commerce. Alcock demonstrated an interest in economics and general commercial studies, which encouraged an interest publicly in establishing a Board of Commercial Studies. His work to establish commercial studies courses led to the creation of a Faculty of Commerce at the university which would offer degrees from 1925 onwards.

Alcock was dean of the Faculty of Arts from 1923 to 1938, was president of the Board of Faculties (later Professorial Board) and a member of the Diploma in Journalism course committee. He also served on the Senate's broadcasting sub-committee, the development of the St Lucia campus committee and library committee. He was president of the Historical Society of Queensland.

== Later life ==
Henry Alcock died in 1948, and was survived by his wife, Olga and three daughters.

== Legacy ==
Alcock created thousands of glass lantern slides, some from photographs he took himself, others which he copied. It is believed he used these slides to illustrate his lectures at the university and at the Workers' Education Association. The University of Queensland Fryer Library holds over 2000 of these slides (known as the Alcock Collection). These slides are being digitised and made available online as funding permits.

A stone grotesque featuring Alcock's likeness hangs in the Great Court at the University of Queensland, in recognition of his work in establishing the early university.
