= John Latham (judge) =

Australian politician and judge (1877–1964)

The Right Honourable Sir John Latham GCMG PC QC
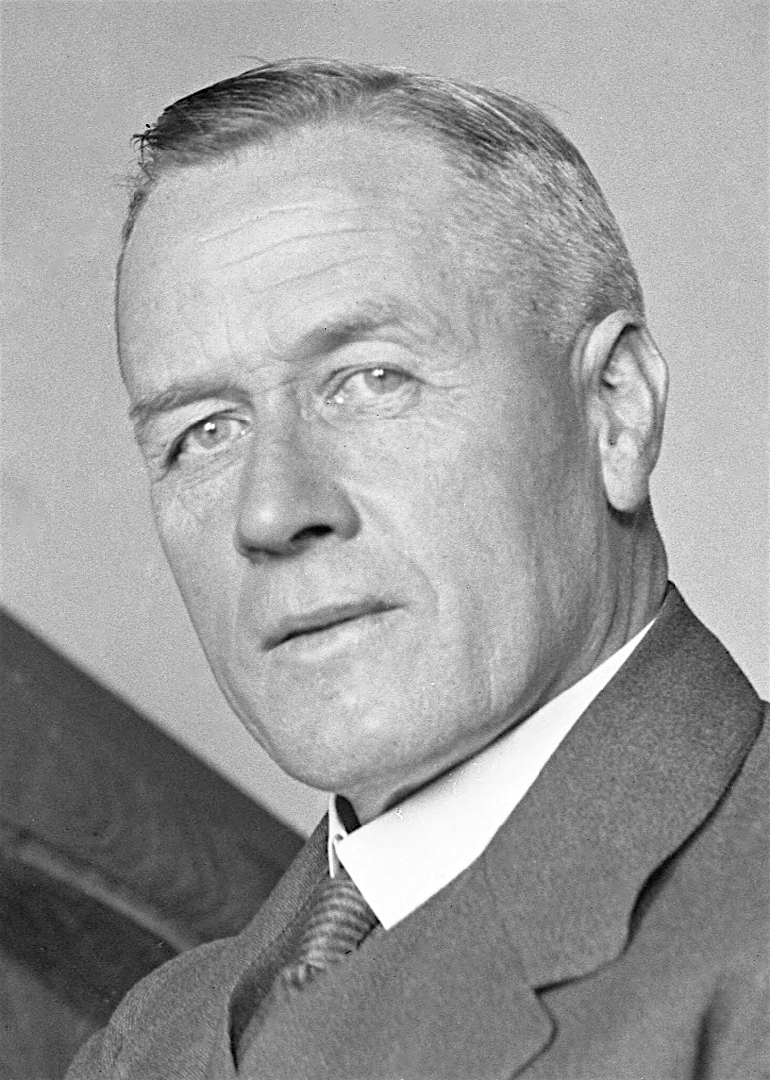
- Latham in 1931

Chief Justice of Australia
- In office 11 October 1935 – 7 April 1952
- Nominated by: Joseph Lyons
- Appointed by: Sir Isaac Isaacs
- Preceded by: Sir Frank Gavan Duffy
- Succeeded by: Sir Owen Dixon

Attorney-General of Australia
- In office 6 January 1932 – 12 October 1934
- Prime Minister: Joseph Lyons
- Preceded by: Frank Brennan
- Succeeded by: Robert Menzies
- In office 18 December 1925 – 22 October 1929
- Prime Minister: Stanley Bruce
- Preceded by: Littleton Groom
- Succeeded by: Frank Brennan

Minister for External Affairs
- In office 6 January 1932 – 12 October 1934
- Prime Minister: Joseph Lyons
- Preceded by: James Scullin
- Succeeded by: Sir George Pearce

Minister for Industry
- In office 6 January 1932 – 12 October 1934
- Prime Minister: Joseph Lyons
- Preceded by: James Scullin
- Succeeded by: Robert Menzies
- In office 10 December 1928 – 22 October 1929
- Prime Minister: Stanley Bruce
- Preceded by: New title
- Succeeded by: James Scullin

Leader of the Opposition
- In office 22 October 1929 – 7 May 1931
- Prime Minister: James Scullin
- Deputy: Henry Gullett
- Preceded by: James Scullin
- Succeeded by: Joseph Lyons

Leader of the Nationalist Party
- In office 22 October 1929 – 7 May 1931
- Deputy: Henry Gullett
- Preceded by: Stanley Bruce
- Succeeded by: Party dissolved

Deputy Leader of the United Australia Party
- In office 7 May 1931 – 15 September 1934
- Leader: Joseph Lyons
- Preceded by: party established
- Succeeded by: Robert Menzies

Member of the Australian Parliament for Kooyong
- In office 16 December 1922 – 7 August 1934
- Preceded by: Robert Best
- Succeeded by: Robert Menzies

Personal details
- Born: John Greig Latham; 26 August 1877 Ascot Vale, Victoria, Australia
- Died: 25 July 1964 (aged 86) Richmond, Victoria, Australia
- Party: Liberal Union (1921–1925); Nationalist (1925–1931); United Australia (1931–1934)
- Spouse: Ella Tobin (m. 1907)
- Education: Scotch College
- Alma mater: University of Melbourne

Sir John Greig Latham (26 August 1877 – 25 July 1964) was an Australian lawyer, politician, and judge who served as the fifth Chief Justice of Australia, in office from 1935 to 1952. He had earlier served as Attorney-General of Australia under Stanley Bruce and Joseph Lyons, and was Leader of the Opposition from 1929 to 1931 as the final leader of the Nationalist Party.

Latham was born in Melbourne. He studied arts and law at the University of Melbourne, and was called to the bar in 1904. He soon became one of Victoria's best known barristers. In 1917, Latham joined the Royal Australian Navy as the head of its intelligence division. He served on the Australian delegation to the 1919 Paris Peace Conference, where he came into conflict with Prime Minister Billy Hughes. At the 1922 federal election, Latham was elected to parliament as an independent on an anti-Hughes platform. He got on better with Hughes' successor Stanley Bruce, and formally joined the Nationalist Party in 1925, subsequently winning promotion to cabinet as Attorney-General. He was also Minister for Industry from 1928, and was one of the architects of the unpopular industrial relations policy that contributed to the government's defeat at the 1929 election. Bruce lost his seat, and Latham was reluctantly persuaded to become Leader of the Opposition.

In 1931, Latham led the Nationalists into the new United Australia Party, joining with Joseph Lyons and other disaffected Labor MPs. Despite the Nationalists forming a larger proportion of the new party, he relinquished the leadership to Lyons, a better campaigner, thus becoming the first opposition leader to fail to contest a general election. In the Lyons government, Latham was the de facto deputy prime minister, serving both as Attorney-General and Minister for External Affairs. He retired from politics in 1934, and the following year was appointed to the High Court as Chief Justice. From 1940 to 1941, Latham took a leave of absence from the court to become the inaugural Australian Ambassador to Japan. He left office in 1952 after almost 17 years as Chief Justice; only Garfield Barwick has served for longer.

== Early life ==
Latham was born on 26 August 1877 in Ascot Vale, Victoria, in the western suburbs of Melbourne. He was the first of five children born to Janet (née Scott) and Thomas Edwin Latham. His mother was born in the Orkney Islands of Scotland, while his father was Australian-born. His paternal grandfather, Thomas Latham, was an attorney's clerk who was transported to Australia as a convict in 1848 for obtaining money under false pretences, and later worked as an accountant.

Latham's father was a tinsmith by profession, but "preferred benevolent work over a comfortable salary" and became a long-serving secretary of the Victorian Society for the Protection of Animals. The family moved to Ivanhoe in Melbourne's eastern suburbs shortly after Latham's birth. His father was also a justice of the peace and served on the Heidelberg Town Council in later life. Latham began his education at the George Street State School in Fitzroy. He subsequently won a scholarship to attend Scotch College, Melbourne, and went on to graduate Bachelor of Arts from the University of Melbourne in 1896.

After completing his undergraduate degree, Latham spent two years as a schoolteacher at a private academy in Hamilton, Victoria. He returned to the University of Melbourne to study law in 1899, where he also tutored in philosophy and logic at Ormond College. He was admitted to the Victorian Bar in 1904 but struggled for briefs in his first years as a barrister and primarily worked in the Court of Petty Sessions and County Court.

In 1907, Latham played a key role in establishing the Education Act Defence League, a rationalist organisation aimed at upholding the secular provisions of the Education Act 1872. In 1909 he became the inaugural president of the Victorian Rationalist Association (VRA). He campaigned against the University of Melbourne's plans to open a divinity school.

== World War I ==
In 1915, at the request of Thomas Bavin, Latham became secretary of the Victorian branch of the Universal Service League, an organisation supporting conscription for overseas service. In 1917 he joined the Australian Navy as head of Naval Intelligence, with the honorary rank of lieutenant commander. His appointment was prompted by complaints of sabotage in naval dockyards, while he later investigated allegations of Bolshevik activity in the Navy.

Latham accompanied navy minister Joseph Cook to London in 1918, assisting him at Imperial War Cabinet meetings and later in his role on the Commission on Czechoslovak Affairs at the Versailles Peace Conference. He also served as an adviser to Prime Minister Billy Hughes, but was "critical of his excesses and affronted by his manner" and "conceived an antipathy to Hughes that remained throughout his political career". For his services, Latham was appointed Companion of the Order of St Michael and St George (CMG) in the 1920 New Year Honours.

== Legal career ==
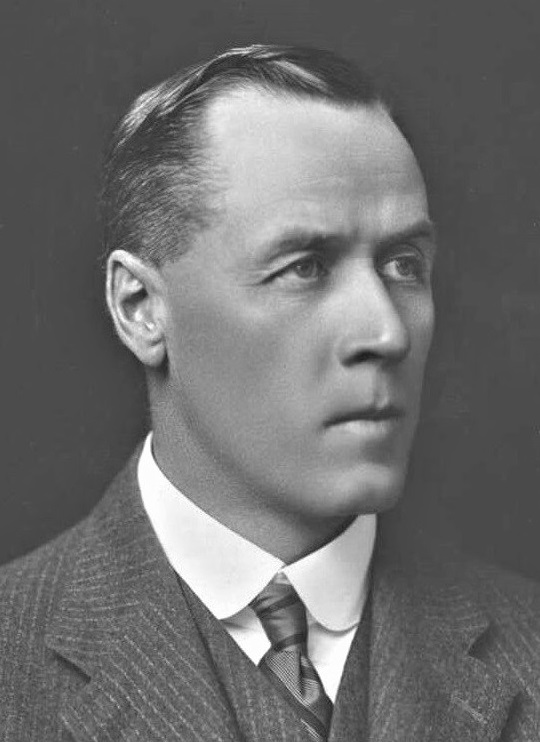
John Latham in the 1920s

Latham had a distinguished career as a barrister. He was admitted to the Victorian Bar in 1904, and was made a King's Counsel in 1922. In 1920, Latham appeared before the High Court representing the State of Victoria in the famous Engineers' case, alongside such people as Dr H.V. Evatt and Robert Menzies.

== Politics ==
=== Early career ===
Latham was elected to the House of Representatives at the 1922 federal election, standing as a self-described "Progressive Liberal" in the seat of Kooyong. He received the endorsement of the newly created Liberal Union, "a coalition of Nationalist Party defectors and people opposed to socialism and Hughes". He additionally received support from the conservative Australian Women's National League, the imperialist Australian Legion, and colleagues in Melbourne's legal profession. He did not fully accept the Liberal Union's platform, although he claimed to "strongly support the attitude of the Union", and issued his own platform consisting of nine principles including a slogan that "Hughes Must Go". At the election, Latham narrowly defeated the incumbent Nationalist MP Robert Best.

The 1922 election resulted in a hung parliament, with Latham siding with the Country Party to force Hughes' resignation as prime minister in favour of S. M. Bruce. While notionally remaining an independent, he soon announced his support for the new government and attended meetings of government parties. His early contributions in parliament concentrated on foreign affairs and the need for greater involvement of Australia and the other Dominions in developing imperial foreign policy.

Latham was re-elected at the 1925 election, standing as an endorsed Nationalist candidate in Kooyong. He subsequently joined Bruce's government as attorney-general. His major concerns in that role were "legislating against domestic communists and aligned interests, and reforming industrial arbitration law". Latham also served as a key advisor to Bruce on foreign affairs, accompanying him to the 1926 Imperial Conference in London. He was pleased with the Balfour Declaration on the constitutional status of Dominions which emerged from the conference, stating that it "embodies the most effective and useful work that any Imperial Conference has yet accomplished".

In 1929, Latham published Australia and the British Commonwealth, a book detailing the evolution of the British Empire into the British Commonwealth of Nations and its implications for Australia.

=== Leader of the Opposition ===
After Bruce lost his Parliamentary seat in 1929, Latham was elected as leader of the Nationalist Party, and hence Leader of the Opposition. He opposed the ratification of the Statute of Westminster (1931) and worked very hard to prevent it.

Two years later, Joseph Lyons led defectors from the Labor Party across the floor and merged them with the Nationalists to form the United Australia Party. Although the new party was dominated by former Nationalists, Latham agreed to become Deputy Leader of the Opposition under Lyons. It was believed having a former Labor man at the helm would present an image of national unity in the face of the economic crisis. Additionally, the affable Lyons was seen as much more electorally appealing than the aloof Latham, especially given that the UAP's primary goal was to win over natural Labor constituencies to what was still, at bottom, an upper- and middle-class conservative party. Future ALP leader Arthur Calwell wrote in his autobiography, Be Just and Fear Not, that by standing aside in favour of Lyons, Latham knew he was giving up a chance to become prime minister.

=== Lyons government ===
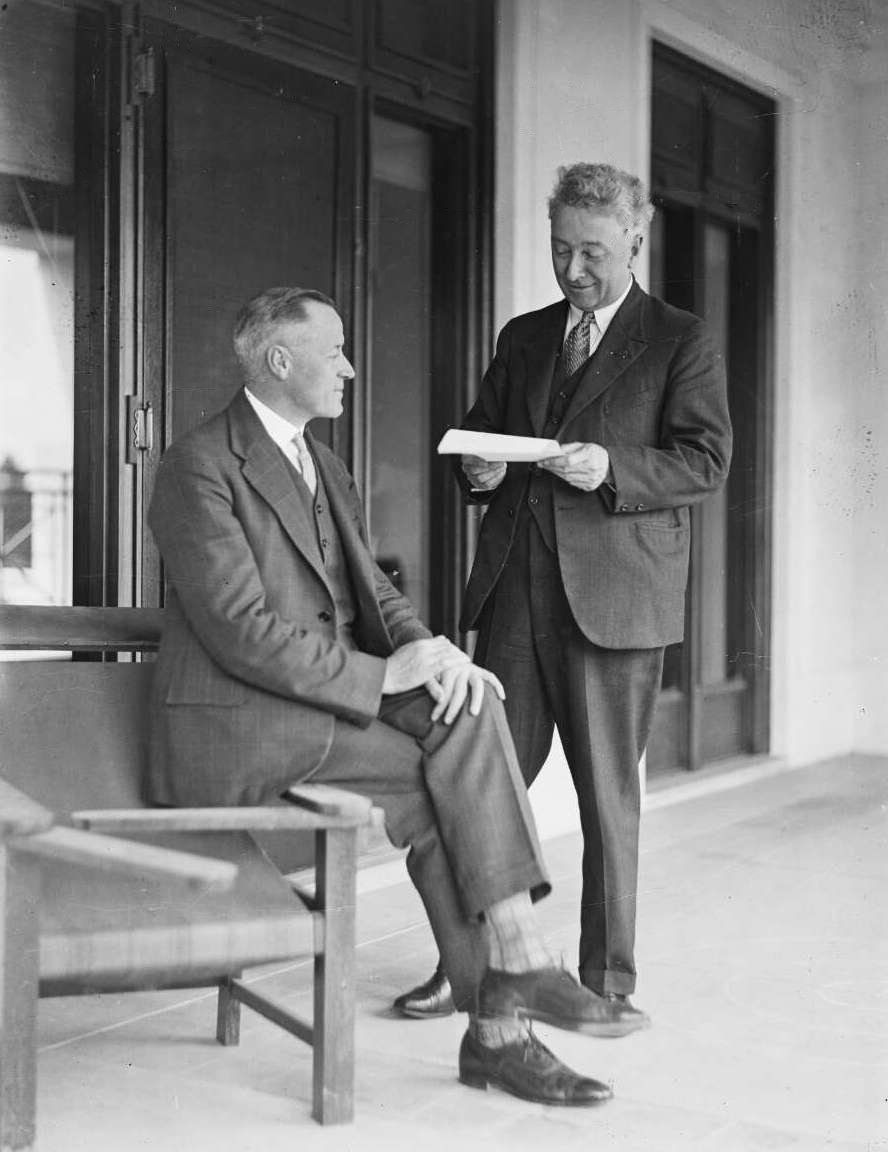
Latham and Prime Minister Joseph Lyons, c. 1932

The UAP won a huge victory in the 1931 election, and Latham was appointed attorney-general once again. He also served as Minister for External Affairs and (unofficially) the Deputy Prime Minister. Latham held these positions until 1934, when he retired from the Commonwealth Parliament. He was succeeded as member for Kooyong, attorney-general and minister of industry by Menzies, who would go on to become Australia's longest-serving prime minister. Latham became the first former opposition leader who was neither a former or future prime minister to become a minister and was the only person to hold this distinction until Bill Hayden in 1983.

As external affairs minister, Latham "judged the measured accommodation of Japan to be a priority in Australia’s approach to regional affairs". During the Manchurian Crisis and subsequent Japanese invasion of Manchuria, he and Lyons avoided making public statements on the matter and the government adopted a policy of non-alignment in the conflict. In meetings with Japanese foreign minister Kōki Hirota he unsuccessfully attempted to convince Japan to remain within the League of Nations.

In mid-1934, Latham led the Australian Eastern Mission to East Asia and South-East Asia, Australia's first diplomatic mission to Asia and outside of the British Empire. The mission, which visited seven territories but concentrated on China, Japan and the Dutch East Indies (present-day Indonesia), has been identified as a milestone in the early development of Australian foreign policy. Latham publicly identified the mission as one of "friendship and goodwill", but also compiled a series of secret reports to cabinet on economic and strategic matters. He "actively sought information about trading opportunities across Asia, entering into frequent and detailed discussions with prime ministers, foreign ministers, premiers and governors about Australia‘s trading and commercial interests, custom duties and tariffs". On his return, Latham successfully advocated in cabinet for the appointment of trade commissioners in Asia, where previously Australia had been represented by British officials.

== Chief Justice of Australia ==
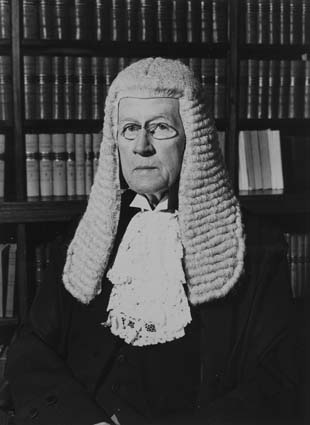
Latham as Chief Justice in 1945

Latham was appointed Chief Justice of the High Court of Australia on 11 October 1935. From 1940 to 1941, he took leave from the Court and travelled to Tokyo to serve as Australia's first Minister to Japan. He retired from the High Court in April 1952, after a then-record 16 years in office.

As Chief Justice, Latham corresponded with political figures to an extent later writers have viewed as inappropriate. Latham offered advice on political matters – frequently unsolicited – to several prime ministers and other senior government figures. During World War II, he made a number of suggestions about defence and foreign policy, and provided John Curtin with a list of constitutional amendments he believed should be made to increase the federal government's power. Towards the end of his tenure, Latham's correspondence increasingly revealed his personal views on major political issues that had previously come before the court; namely, opposition to the Chifley government's health policies and support of the Menzies Government's attempt to ban the Communist Party. He advised Earle Page on how the government could amend the constitution to legally ban the Communist Party, and corresponded with his friend Richard Casey on ways to improve the Liberal Party's platform.

According to Fiona Wheeler, there was no direct evidence that Latham's political views interfered with his judicial reasoning, but "the mere appearance of partiality is enough for concern" and could have been difficult to refute if uncovered. She particularly singles out his correspondence with Casey as "an extraordinary display of political partisanship by a serving judge." Although Latham emphasised the need for secrecy to the recipients of his letters, he retained copies of most of them in his personal papers, apparently unconcerned that they could be discovered and analysed after his death. He rationalised his actions as those of a private individual, separate from his official position, and maintained a "Janus-like divide between his public and private persona". In other fora he took pains to demonstrate his independence, rejecting speaking engagements if he believed they could be construed as political statements. Nonetheless, "many instances of Latham's advising [...] would today be regarded as clear affronts to basic standards of judicial independence and propriety".

Latham was one of only eight justices of the High Court to have served in the Parliament of Australia prior to his appointment to the Court; the others were Edmund Barton, Richard O'Connor, Isaac Isaacs, H. B. Higgins, Edward McTiernan, Garfield Barwick, and Lionel Murphy.

== Personal life ==
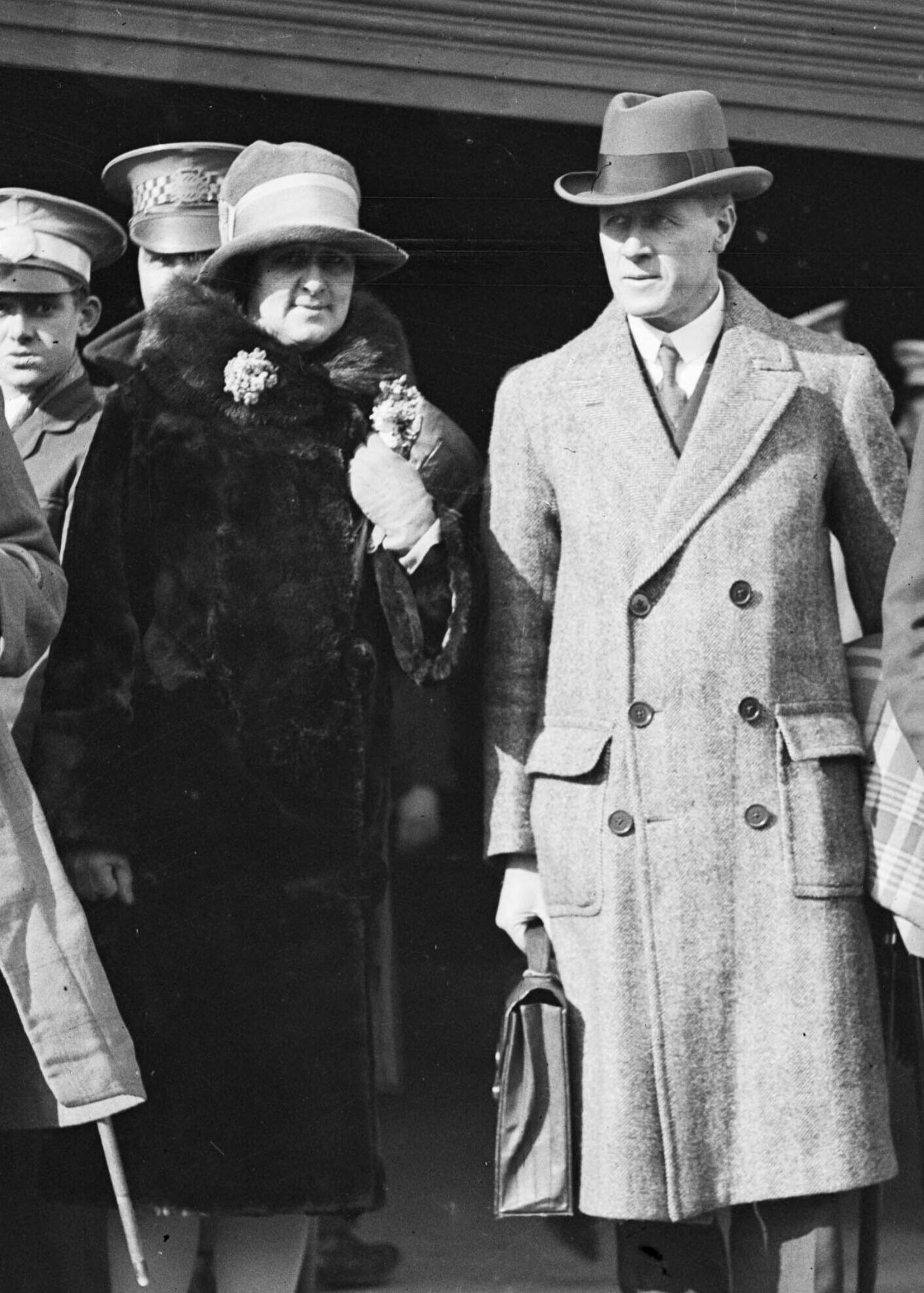
Latham and his wife Ella in 1927

He was a prominent rationalist and atheist, after abandoning his parents' Methodism at university. It was at this time that he ended his engagement to Elizabeth (Bessie) Moore, the daughter of Methodist Minister Henry Moore. Bessie later married Edwin P. Carter on 18 May 1911 at the Northcote Methodist Church, High Street, Northcote.

In 1907, Latham married schoolteacher Ella Tobin. They had three children, two of whom predeceased him. His wife, Ella, also predeceased him. Latham died in 1964 in the Melbourne suburb of Richmond.

He was also a prominent campaigner for Australian literature, being part of the editorial board of The Trident, a small liberal journal, which was edited by Walter Murdoch. The board also included poet Bernard O'Dowd.

Latham was president of the Free library movement of Victoria from 1937 and served as president of the Library Association of Australia from 1950 to 1953. He was the first non-librarian to hold the position.

== Legacy ==
The Canberra suburb of Latham was named after him in 1971. There is also a lecture theatre named after him at The University of Melbourne. Latham Peak, a mountain in Antarctica is also named after him.

== Footnotes ==
Parliament of Australia
Preceded by Robert Best	Member for Kooyong; 1922–1934	Succeeded by Robert Menzies
Political offices
Preceded by Littleton Groom	Attorney-General of Australia; 1925–1929	Succeeded by Frank Brennan
New title	Minister for Industry; 1928–1929	Succeeded by James Scullin
Preceded by James Scullin	Leader of the Opposition; 1929–1931	Succeeded by Joseph Lyons
Preceded by Henry Gullett	Deputy Leader of the Opposition; 1931–1932	Succeeded by Frank Forde
Preceded by Littleton Groom	Attorney-General of Australia; 1932–1934	Succeeded by Robert Menzies
Preceded by James Scullin	Minister for External Affairs; 1932–1934	Succeeded by George Pearce
Preceded by James Scullin	Minister for Industry; 1932–1934	Succeeded by Robert Menzies
Party political offices
Preceded by Stanley Bruce	Leader of the Nationalist Party; 1929–1931	Party disbanded
Legal offices
Preceded by Sir Frank Gavan Duffy	Chief Justice of Australia; 1935–1952	Succeeded by Sir Owen Dixon
Diplomatic posts
Preceded by Eric Longfield Lloyd as Commissioner	Australian Minister to Japan; 1940–1941	Vacant Declaration of war Title next held by William Macmahon Ball
