= Australia–Japan relations =

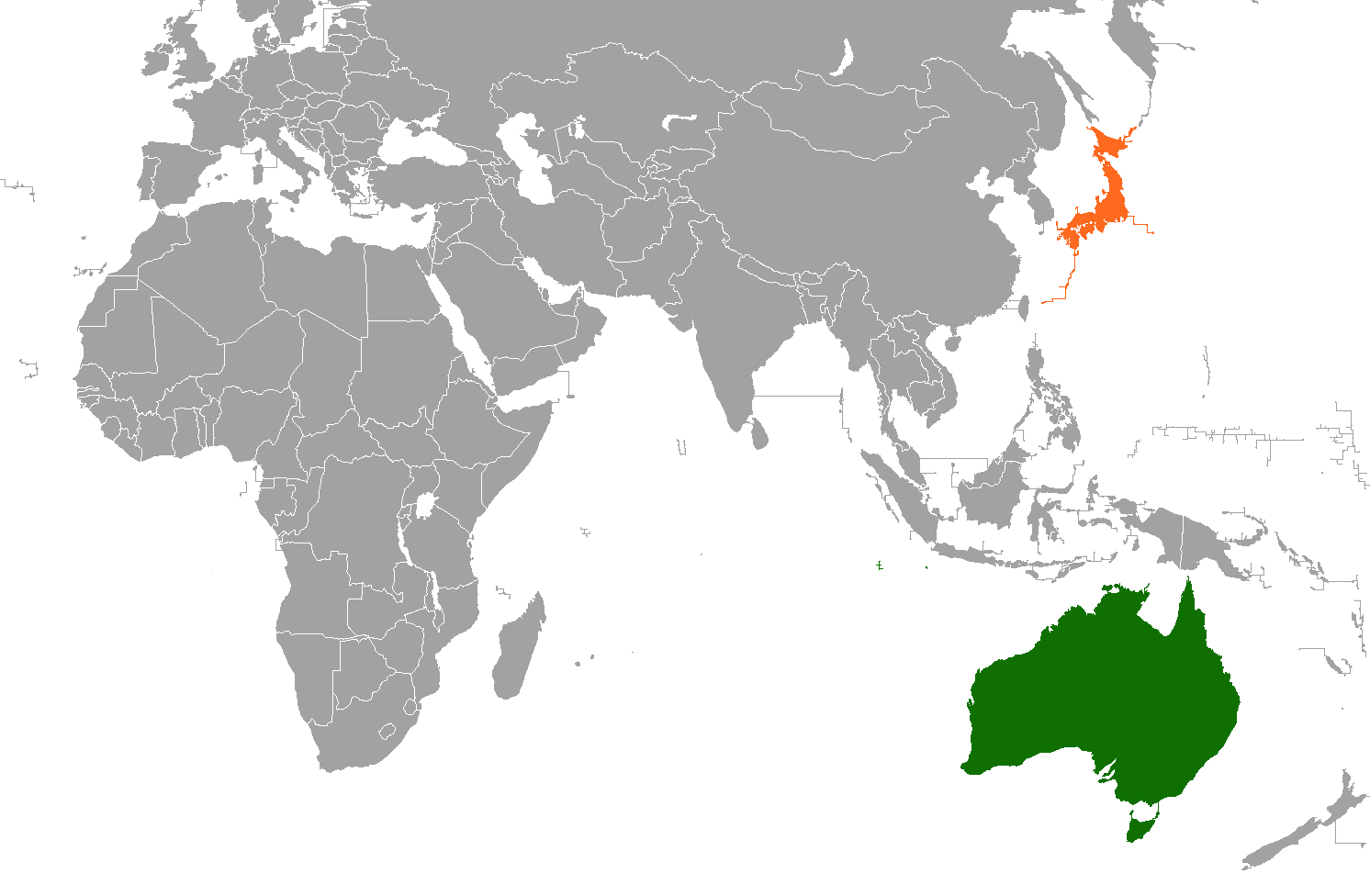

- Australia: Japan

Diplomatic mission
- Australian Embassy, Tokyo: Japanese Embassy, Canberra

Australia–Japan relations are the bilateral relations between the Commonwealth of Australia and Japan.

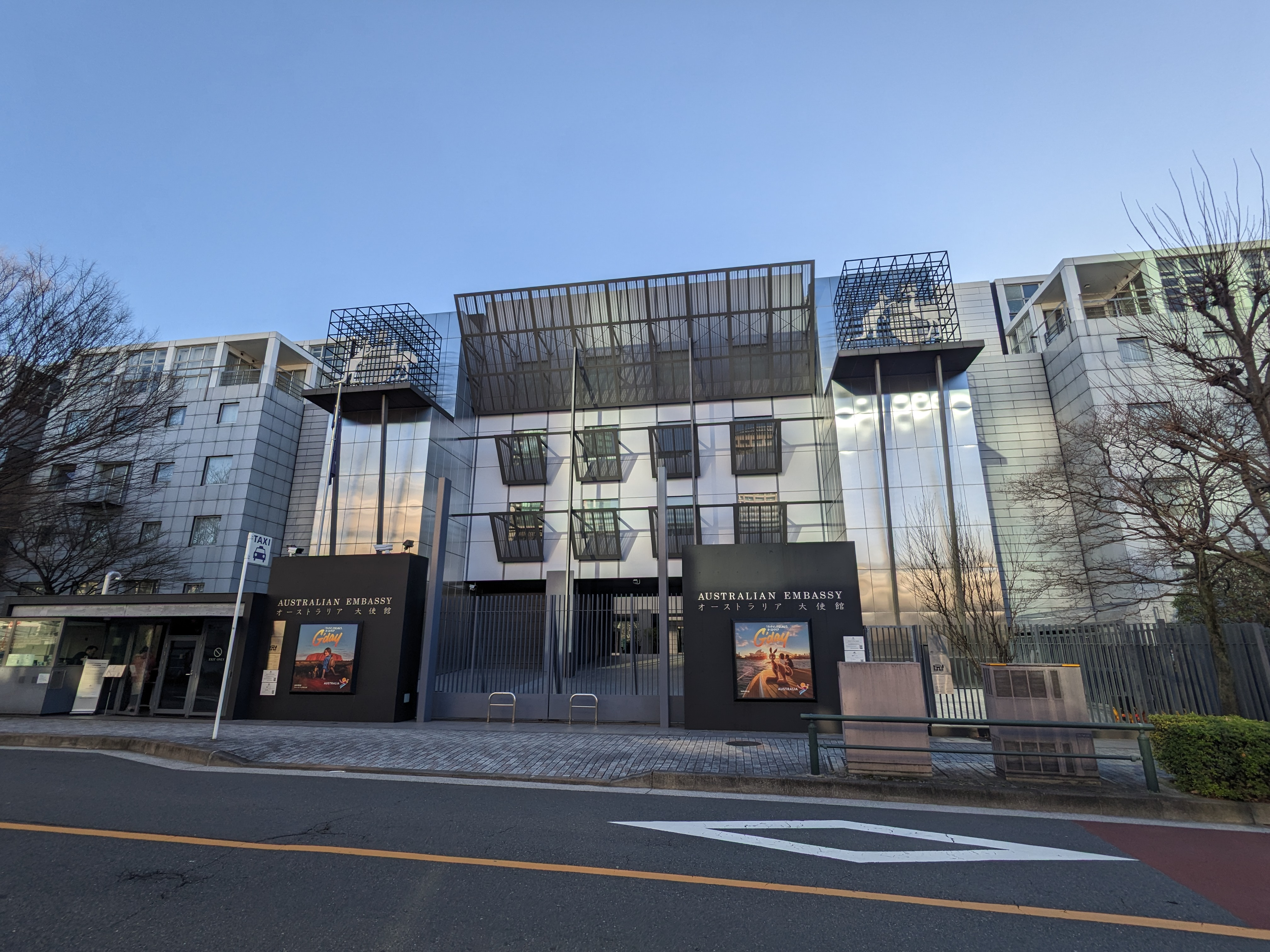
Embassy of Australia in Tokyo

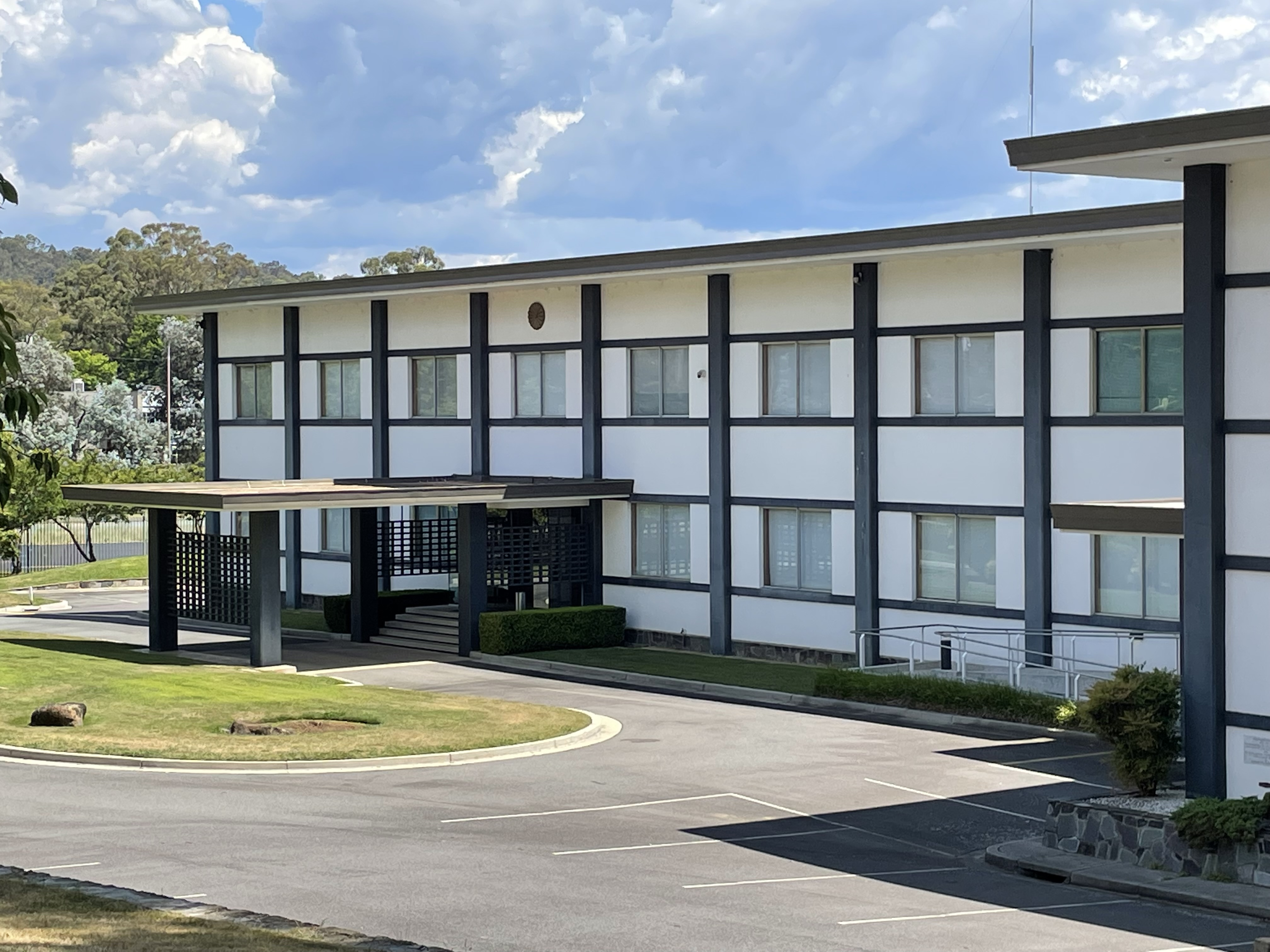
Embassy of Japan in Canberra

Geographically, the two countries are situated in the Asia-Pacific region, with neither country sharing land borders with any other nation. The relationship is generally warm and has continued to grow and strengthen over the years, particularly in relation to defence and security. Both nations are parliamentary constitutional monarchies with close ties to the Western world. Additionally, Australia and Japan are both close allies of the United States, and play an important role in the regional security architecture, as well as the rules-based international order. Both countries are heavily dependent on international trade, with Japan relying on imports of Australian agricultural and energy products, and Australia importing significant quantities of Japanese end-products and consumer goods. Australian troops constituted the majority of Commonwealth Forces which occupied large parts of Japan following the Second World War. In turn, Australia has an extensive history of Japanese influence, with successive waves of immigrants contributing to the social and cultural fabric of modern Australia. Consequently, Australia and Japan have developed a substantial bilateral relationship anchored by mutual interests and reinforced by strong historical, cultural, and people-to-people ties. Today, Japan is Australia's “second largest trading partner and an increasingly important source of capital investment". The relationship continues to expand beyond economic and commercial ties to other spheres, including cultural exchanges, tourism, defence and scientific cooperation.

At the beginning of the 20th century, Japan and Australia enjoyed cordial relations, and fought on the same side in the First World War. Early points of contention centred on discrimination against Japanese migrants vis-à-vis the White Australia policy. Japanese expansionism and colonial ambitions further strained relations, with many Australians fearing the possibility of a Japanese invasion. Diplomatic relations were disrupted and considerably damaged by the Second World War; in particular, Japanese air raids on Australia and Japan’s treatment of Australian and allied prisoners of war. Australian suspicion of Japan remained elevated following the re-establishment of diplomatic ties in the early 1950s, and was exacerbated by Japan's perceived economic domination throughout the latter half of the century. However, by the 1980s and early 1990s, Australian government and business leaders had come to see Japan as a vital export market and an essential element in Australia's future growth and prosperity in the Asia-Pacific region. Japan, for its part, regards Australia as an important partner, a reliable source of energy, minerals and other primary products, a popular tourist destination, and the only other middle-ranking economic power in the Asia-Pacific. In 2013, Australia's former Prime Minister Tony Abbott hailed Japan as Australia's closest friend in Asia and proceeded with a free trade agreement (FTA) between the two nations in the following year. Australia and Japan acknowledge one another as key strategic partners in the Asia-Pacific, with both being prosperous liberal democracies and key allies of the United States. Former Defence Minister Marise Payne described Japan as a "key partner" in the region; for his part, Japanese Prime Minister Fumio Kishida described the relationship as the linchpin of security in the Indo-Pacific.

Australia maintains an embassy in Tokyo, and a consulate-general in Osaka. Japan maintains an embassy in Canberra, consulates-general in Sydney, Melbourne, Brisbane, and Perth, along with a consulate in Cairns. Both countries are members of regional groupings such as the Asia-Pacific Economic Cooperation and Comprehensive and Progressive Agreement for Trans-Pacific Partnership.

== History ==
=== Prehistory ===
Anthropologists have noted that Japanese Jomon skulls and the skulls of Ainu people (descendants of the Jomon) shared certain physical traits with Indigenous Australians more than they did with modern East Asians, like the Han Chinese or the later Yayoi Japanese settlers. Fossils found in Okinawa (dated around 20,000 years ago) were theorized to be closely related to Australia’s Keilor remains, suggesting a common ancestor.

=== Colonial period ===
Between 1635 and 1854, Japanese citizens were in a self-imposed period of isolation from the outside world, which limited their knowledge of it. Australia began appearing on Japanese maps towards the end of the 18th century, which was prior to its colonization by the British. Up until 1794, the Japanese drew Australia as being double its actual size, with New Guinea still attached. A 1791 Russian map with Australia depicted correctly reached Japan in 1792, and influenced their later maps. This Russian map arrived in Japan through Daikokuya Kōdayū, who came into contact with Russians in 1783, after getting shipwrecked on Amchitka Island in the North Pacific (part of Alaska's Aleutian Islands, then controlled by Russia). Kōdayū lived among Russians and the native Aleuts, who enacted an uprising in 1784, before eventually being returned home to Japan in October 1792.

The first recorded import of Australian coal by Japan occurred in 1865, and the first recorded Japanese imports of Australian wool occurred in 1888. The first Japanese person known to have settled in Australia was a merchant who migrated to Queensland in 1871. By the start of the Australian Federation in 1901, it was estimated that Australia had 4000 Japanese immigrants, mostly based around Townsville where the Japanese government had established its first consulate in 1896. The immigrants worked mostly in the sugar cane and maritime industries including turtle, trochus, trepang and pearl harvesting.

The Japanese government established a second consulate in Sydney in 1897, which was upgraded to the status of consulate-general in 1902. In the 19th century and early 20th century, the Japanese used the term Nan’yō (South Sea) to refer to Australia and neighboring areas such as Micronesia and Indonesia. By the 1920s, the term evolved into two distinct subgroupings that divided the space into inner and outer parts: the inner or UchiNan’yō referred to the Micronesian island groups encompassing Palau, the Caroline Islands, the Mariana Islands, the Marshall Islands, and the Gilbert Islands; the outer or UraNan’yō took on a wider expanse of territory, extending into the Indonesian archipelago and stretching as far as Australia.

=== Post-Federation (1901–1941) ===
Following the federation of the Australian colonies in 1901, the new federal government formally enacted the White Australia policy with the aim of barring non-European peoples, including the Japanese, from immigrating to Australia. Hisakichi Eitaki, the Japanese consul in Sydney, lodged a formal protest to Prime Minister Edmund Barton over the proposed Immigration Restriction Act 1901 and asked that Japanese citizens be exempted from the dictation test requirements as "the Japanese belong to an Empire whose standard of civilization is so much higher than that of Kanakas, Negroes, Pacific Islanders, Indians, or other Eastern peoples".

In 1904, the Watson government introduced the so-called "passport agreement", whereby Japanese citizens were exempted from the dictation test if they bore a valid passport specifying the purpose and duration of their visits. This arrangement was similar to the Gentlemen's Agreement of 1907 later established between the United States and Japan. In 1905, the Deakin government passed the Immigration Restriction Amendment Act 1905, which amended the provisions of the dictation test to remove the reference to "any European language" to "any prescribed language". While the amended legislation did not contain any special provisions for Japanese citizens, it was seen as a concession to the Japanese following the Japanese victory in the Russo-Japanese War which reinforced Japan's military equality with European powers. However, this was only a minor concession as it "made no difference to the Commonwealth's basic policy of excluding Japanese permanent settlers from Australia".

Both countries were among the victorious allied powers of World War I. At the Paris Peace Conference, which resulted in the creation of the League of Nations, Australian prime minister Billy Hughes strongly opposed the Japanese government's Racial Equality Proposal. Hughes believed the proposal was a ploy for the Japanese to send migrants to New Guinea (which Australia controlled at the time) as part of their southward expansion efforts. After World War I, the Japanese had gained control of most Micronesian islands from Germany, and Hughes viewed New Guinea as being an important buffer between these areas and Australia.

In 1930–31, Japan was "Australia's third most important trading partner". Economic relations continued to flourish, and by the mid-1930s, Japan had become Australia's second largest export market after the United Kingdom.

Relations with Japan were the primary focus of the Australian Eastern Mission of 1934, a diplomatic tour of East and South-East Asia led by deputy prime minister John Latham. Latham met with Japanese foreign minister Kōki Hirota in May 1934 and covered a range of topics, including the Manchurian question and Japanese readmission to the League of Nations. This meeting marked the first direct interaction between government ministers of the two countries and has been described by one writer as "one of the most important in Australian diplomatic history".

=== World War II (1941–1945) ===
During World War II, Australian territory was directly threatened by Japanese invasion, and Japanese forces attacked Darwin, Broome, and Sydney Harbour. Australia represented Japan's southernmost region of operation in the Pacific theater, which covered an area of the Pacific Ocean extending as far north as the Aleutian Islands. In 1941, the ethnic Japanese population in Australia was interned, and most were deported to Japan at the end of the war. Australian forces played an active combat role in battles throughout the Southeast Asia and South West Pacific theater of World War II, most notable events of the war among both parties were the Kokoda Track campaign and the Sandakan Death Marches (of which in 2014, the then Japanese Prime Minister Shinzo Abe offered his sincere condolences on behalf of the Japanese people to the Australian Parliament). Australian forces also played a significant role in the post-war Occupation of Japan.

=== During the Occupation period ===
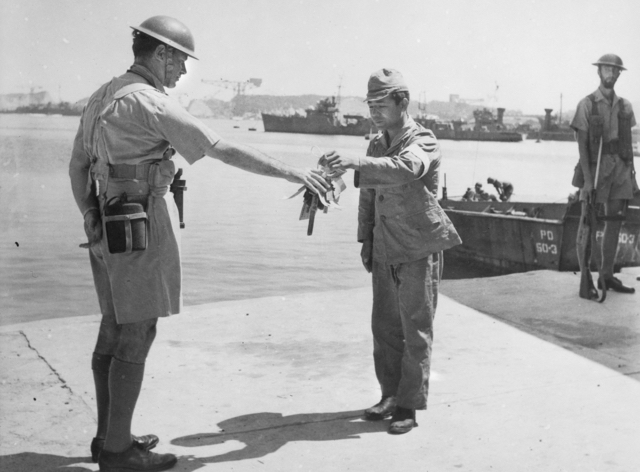
30 August 1945. Yokosuka Naval Base, Tokyo Bay. Commander Yuzo Tanno hands over the keys of the Yokosuka Naval Base to Captain Herbert James Buchanan, Royal Australian Navy. Buchanan led the first British Commonwealth party to go ashore in Japan.

The first time a large number of Australians were in Japan was during the postwar Occupation of Japan. Australians were part of the British Commonwealth Occupation Force. Around 16,000 Australians served in the force. For the entire length of its history the BCOF had an Australian officer. The Australian contribution to the force was 4,700 infantry, 5,300 base personnel, 2,200 from the Royal Australian Air Force, and 130 from the Australian General Hospital. The Royal Australian Navy was also present as part of the British Pacific Fleet. For two-thirds of the period of occupation the Commonwealth was represented solely by Australians.

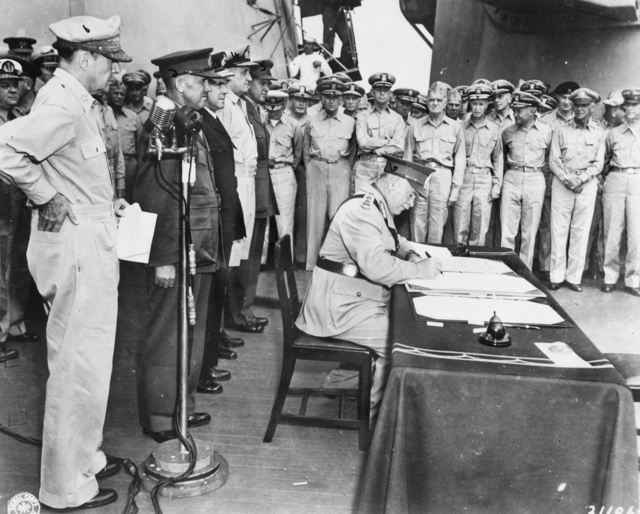
General Blamey signing the Japanese instrument of surrender on behalf of Australia

Australia played a minor role in the Japan campaign in the last months of the war and was preparing to participate in the invasion of Japan at the time the war ended. Several Australian warships operated with the British Pacific Fleet (BPF) during the Battle of Okinawa and Australian destroyers later escorted British aircraft carriers and battleships during attacks on targets in the Japanese home islands. Despite its distance from Japan, Australia was the BPF's main base and a large number of facilities were built to support the fleet.

Australia's participation in the planned invasion of Japan would have involved elements of all three services fighting as part of Commonwealth forces. It was planned to form a new 10th Division from existing AIF personnel which would form part of the Commonwealth Corps with British, Canadian and New Zealand units. The corps' organisation was to be identical to that of a US Army corps, and it would have participated in the invasion of the Japanese home island of Honshū which was scheduled for March 1946. Australian ships would have operated with the BPF and US Pacific Fleet and two RAAF heavy bomber squadrons and a transport squadron were scheduled to be redeployed from Britain to Okinawa to join the strategic bombardment of Japan as part of Tiger Force.

General Blamey signed the Japanese Instrument of Surrender on behalf of Australia during the ceremony held on board USS Missouri on 2 September 1945. Several RAN warships were among the Allied ships anchored in Tokyo Bay during the proceedings. Following the main ceremony on board Missouri, Japanese field commanders surrendered to Allied forces across the Pacific theatre. Australian forces accepted the surrender of their Japanese opponents at ceremonies conducted at Morotai, several locations in Borneo, Timor, Wewak, Rabaul, Bougainville and Nauru.

=== Late 20th century ===
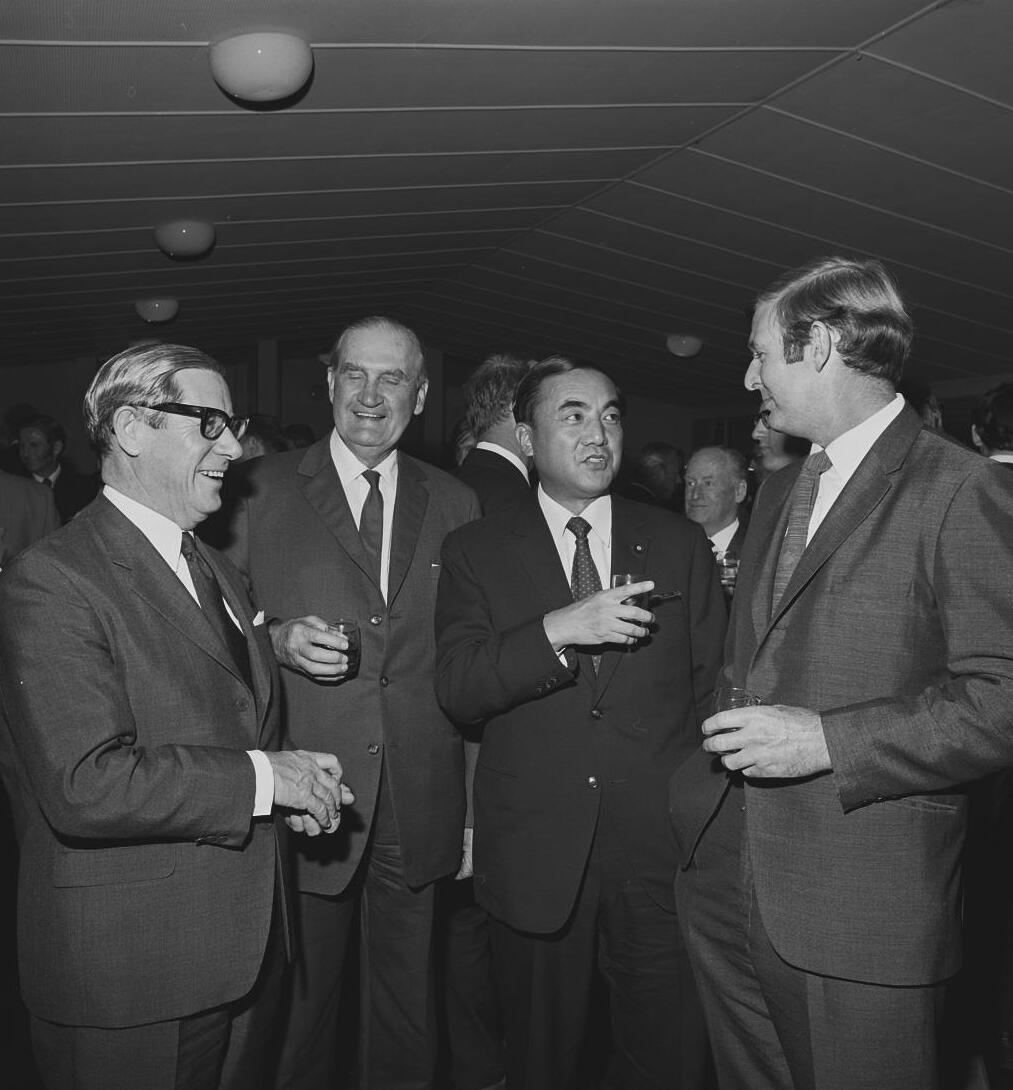
Attendees at the 1972 Australia-Japan Ministerial Meeting in Canberra: Nigel Bowen, John McEwen, Yasuhiro Nakasone, and Doug Anthony.

Diplomatic relations between Australia and Japan were re-established in 1952, following the termination of the Allied occupation, and Haruhiko Nishi was appointed as Japanese ambassador to Australia. In 1957, Australian Prime Minister Robert Menzies visited Japan with the aim of strengthening economic and political ties between the two countries.

In Australia, trade minister John McEwen led a push for closer economic ties with Japan in the early 1950s, seeing the resumption with trade as important for Australian producers as Australia sought new markets outside the pre-war framework of Imperial Preference. After years of negotiations, McEwen and his Japanese counterpart Kishi Nobusuke signed the Japan–Australia Commerce Agreement (JACA) in July 1957, with each country conferring most favoured nation status on the other and Australia providing a commitment to revoke its Article 35 exception to the General Agreement on Tariffs and Trade (GATT) which had allowed it to discriminate against Japan. The removal of the Article 35 exception eventually occurred in 1960 after McEwen secured Japanese concessions on imports of Australian beef. The final discriminatory trade provisions were removed in a new agreement signed in 1963. The JACA "ushered in a new era of Australian trade which would make Japan immeasurably Australia's biggest trading partner".

In 1976, Australia and Japan signed the Basic Treaty of Friendship and Cooperation, which established a broad framework of principles to guide and enhance future bilateral relations in the political, economic, cultural and other fields. The treaty was historically significant as the first comprehensive treaty of its kind for both countries. The first proposal for a comprehensive treaty had been raised by the Japanese delegation in May 1970 at the eighth annual meeting of the Australia-Japan Business Cooperation Committee (AJBCC). A more formal request was raised in October at the Australia-Japan Official Level Talks and then reaffirmed by the Japanese Ambassador in Canberra in 1971 who asked that the prospect of a treaty be "seriously looked at". Formal negotiations took place over a three-year period and encompassed multiple Australian and Japanese governments.

By the late 1980s, Australia and Japan had moved beyond a purely bilateral trade relationship to become among the primary architects of Asia-Pacific regionalism, a collaboration that culminated in the 1989 establishment of the Asia-Pacific Economic Cooperation (APEC) forum. Prior to the formation of APEC, Japanese and Australian leaders had already collaborated on the founding of three previous regional institutions: the Pacific Basin Economic Council (PBEC), the Pacific Trade and Development (PAFTAD) forum and the Pacific Economic Cooperation Council (PECC). The initial public proposal for APEC was delivered by Australian Prime Minister Bob Hawke during a state visit to Seoul in January 1989, and given institutional form a mere 9 months later, since becoming a quintessential example of effective Australian middle power diplomacy. The structural blueprint for the forum had already been co-developed by Japan's Ministry of International Trade and Industry (MITI). It has been claimed that Japan deliberately chose to act as a "silent partner" in the foundation of APEC, and encouraged Australia to take the lead because a Japanese-led proposal might have triggered regional anxieties regarding Japan's wartime history and economic dominance. APEC initially consisted of 12 countries from across the Pacific Rim, including Australia, Brunei Darussalam, Canada, Indonesia, Japan, the Republic of Korea, Malaysia, New Zealand, the Philippines, Singapore, Thailand, and the United States. By 1998, it had expanded to 21 Pacific Rim countries, including China, Russia, Papua New Guinea and countries in Latin America. However, no new members have been admitted since 1998, in order to focus on managing the already broad array of countries.

A number of Australian politicians have been awarded the Order of the Rising Sun, the first national decoration awarded by the Japanese government. Recipients include former Prime Ministers of Australia such as Edmund Barton, Robert Menzies, John McEwen, Malcolm Fraser, Bob Hawke and John Howard.

Australia and Japan have agreed to work together towards the reform of the United Nations, including the realisation of Japan's permanent membership of the Security Council, and to strengthen various regional forums, including not only APEC, but also the ASEAN Regional Forum (ARF) and the East Asia Summit (EAS).

=== 21st century ===
In March 2007, Australia and Japan signed a joint security pact. The scope of security cooperation includes:

- Law enforcement on combating transnational crime, including trafficking in illegal narcotics and precursors, people smuggling and trafficking, counterfeiting currency and arms smuggling
- Border security
- Counter-terrorism
- Disarmament and counter-proliferation of weapons of mass destruction and their means of delivery
- Peace operations
- Exchange of strategic assessments and related information
- Maritime and aviation security
- Humanitarian relief operations, including disaster relief
- Contingency planning, including for pandemics

During the deployment of the Japan Self-Defense Forces on a humanitarian and reconstruction mission to Iraq from 2004 to 2006, Australian units assisted Japanese Special Forces in the protection of Japanese bases.

Diplomatic relations have come under pressure over ideological differences regarding Japan's scientific whaling program. In May 2010, Australia started legal action to halt Japanese whale hunts, despite senior Australian officials and bureaucrats expressing the opinion that the legal action would likely fail. Japan's repeated requests that Australia cease its support for Sea Shepherd's violent attacks upon its whaling fleet have been refused. Although in 2013, Foreign Minister Julie Bishop stated while on a diplomatic trip to Japan that the Australian Government does not officially support Sea Shepherd and disapproves of Sea Shepherd and their violent activities in halting whaling.

This turned around in 2013 with the new Abbott government calling Japan Australia's "closest friend" in Asia, when Japanese Prime Minister Shinzo Abe visited Australia to conclude the Japan–Australia Economic Partnership Agreement and to address the future of the relationship between Australia and Japan, being the first Japanese Prime Minister to address the Parliament of Australia.

With the new Turnbull government starting in 2015, Prime Minister Malcolm Turnbull made a few changes to the bilateral relationship between Australia and Japan. This included a slight pullback in terms of the recent bid for the upgrade of the Royal Australian Navy submarine fleet in 2016, which the new government eventually decided on the French bid, therefore resulting in slight outcry from the Japanese Government; its worth noting that the previous Australian Prime Minister Tony Abbott had closely hinted for his government to choose the Japanese bid over both the French and German bids.

However, Prime Minister Turnbull decided to stimulate values from the previous Abbott government to his government by incorporating themes such as the "closest friend" in Asia. This was seen with increasing bilateral ties in terms of military co-operation, trade, and cultural friendship. In late 2016, Turnbull stopped by on a lighting trip to Tokyo and started to develop a close relationship with Prime Minister Shinzo Abe, following his predecessor's example. Abe later visited Turnbull in Sydney early 2017 during a pivot to South-East Asia, where both increased military, trade, cultural, and sporting ties. Both also discussed the South China Sea Crisis, North Korea, and their anxiety to co-operate with their mutual ally, the United States' new Trump Administration.

In December 2021, Australia and Japan, along with the United States, pledged a new undersea internet cable for the Micronesian countries Nauru, Kiribati and the Federated States of Micronesia. That year, the governments of Australia and Japan also decided to fund two major law enforcement developments in the Marshall Islands.

At a virtual summit on 6 January 2022, Japanese Prime Minister Fumio Kishida and Australian Prime Minister Scott Morrison formally signed the Reciprocal Access Agreement (RAA) - to allow their respective militaries to work seamlessly with each other on defence and humanitarian operations.

During the 2022 Australia-Japan leaders meeting in Perth, Australian Prime Minister Anthony Albanese and Japanese Prime Minister Fumio Kishida agreed to boost Japan's access to hydrogen, LNG and minerals to improve energy security while making a shared push to hit net zero. The two countries have also promised to help other Indo-Pacific countries in their efforts to combat climate change. Albanese said that there was a common desire shared by Australia and Japan for peace in the Indo-Pacific. He also said that "We concurred that our special strategic partnership has risen to a new and higher level."

In 2024 it was announced that members of the Japanese Amphibious Rapid Deployment Brigade would be stationed in Darwin, where they would serve alongside Australian and American forces.

In March 2026, Australia and Japan celebrated 50 years of the Basic Treaty of Friendship and Cooperation. To honor the occasion, Japan's Ambassador to Australia Kazuhiro Suzuki delivered an address at the National Press Club in Canberra, titled "Girt by sea and in the same boat: 50 years of Japan-Australia relations and beyond".

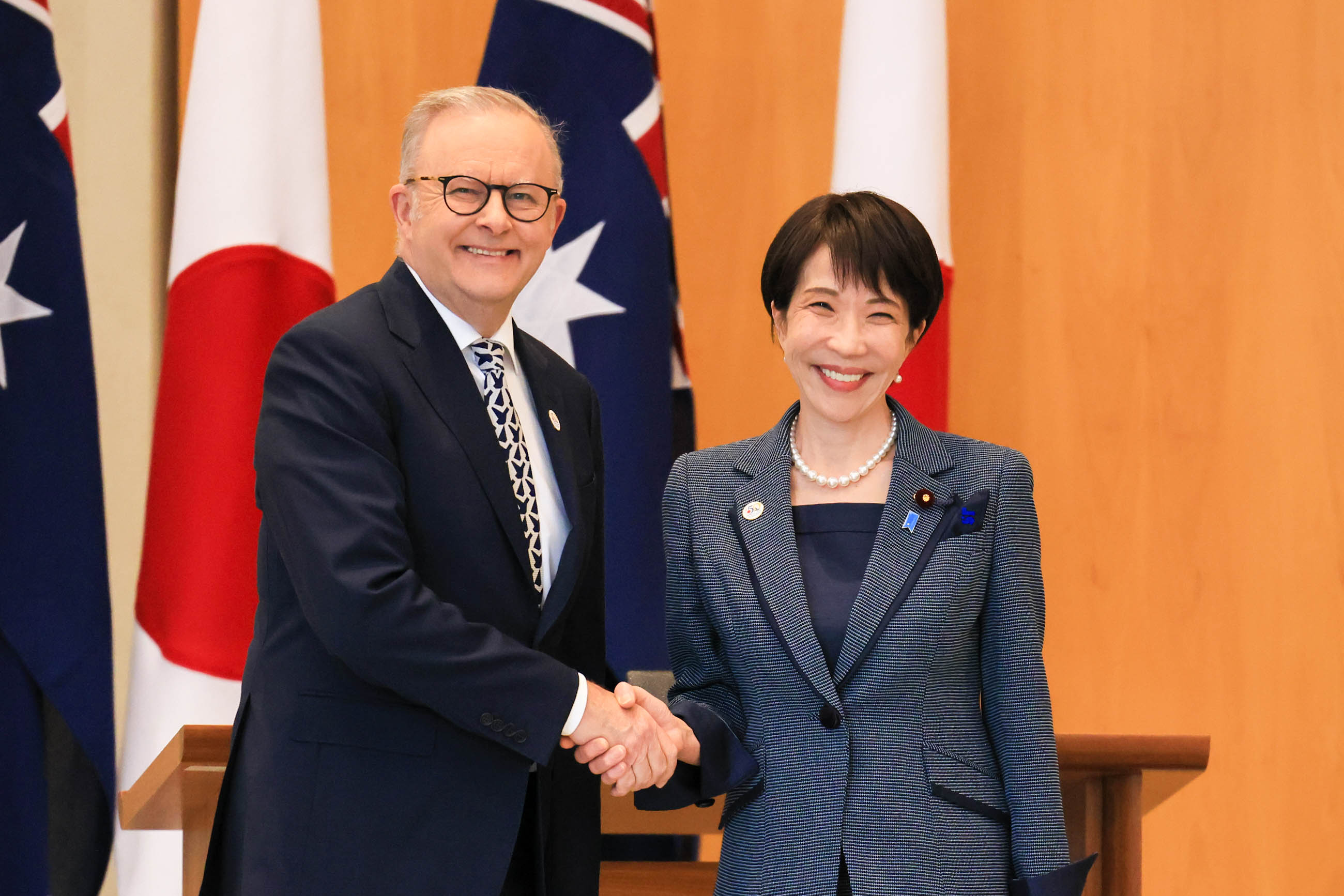
Australian Prime Minister Anthony Albanese with Japanese Prime Minister Sanae Takaichi in Canberra, 4 May 2026

On 4 May 2026, Albanese and Japanese Prime Minister Takaichi Sanae signed four agreements in Canberra to strengthen bilateral cooperation in the areas of energy, defence and critical minerals and a joint declaration on economic security cooperation. The critical minerals agreement identified six rare earth strategic projects to diversify supply chains including the Lynas rare earth project in Kalgoorlie and Alcoa's Gallium Recovery Project. The two heads of government also discussed international issues in East Asia, the Indo-Pacific and the Middle East.

== Economic relations ==
Monthly value (A$ millions) of merchandise imported to Australia from Japan since 1988

Monthly value (A$ millions) of merchandise exported from Australia to Japan since 1988

Australian trade had shifted away from other Commonwealth countries toward Asia around the 1960s and 1970s. Japan in particular had emerged as the leading trading partner. In 1966–67, Japan surpassed the United Kingdom "to become the largest market for Australian exports". Japan is now the second largest export market for Australia (after China), although Japan is ranked only third as a source of imports to Australia after the United States and China. Because of this, Australia has had a trade surplus with Japan.

As Japan protects its agriculture, Australia faces quotas, high tariffs, and standards barriers in exporting agricultural products including beef, butter, and apples to Japan. Japan is "Australia's largest beef export market, taking 35.8% of all beef shipped in 2011".

Negotiations commenced in 2007 on a bilateral free trade agreement between Australia and Japan.

As Australia trades raw minerals to Japan for large amounts of earnings, while Japan trades technology such as televisions, computers and cars. Japan is one of the leading suppliers of a number of manufactured goods imported to Australia: Japan has been the principal source of cars and motorcycles being imported to Australia.

== Military ==
In April 2026, Australia and Japan signed contracts to provide the Australian navy with 11 Improved Mogami-class frigates.

== Migration ==
According to Australian Bureau of Statistics data from 2006, 40,968 Australian people claimed Japanese ancestry. According to Japan's Ministry of Foreign Affairs, there were approximately 9,900, Australian citizens resident in Japan as of 30 June 2017.

== Tourism ==
In 2018, Japan was the fifth largest source of tourism for Australia, with 484,000 Japanese citizens visiting Australia that year. It placed behind the United Kingdom, the United States, New Zealand and China. Visitors from Japan to Australia peaked at 814,000 in 1997. According to data from Google, Japan was Australia's top-searched destination between 2002 and 2022, ranking ahead of New Zealand.

In 2023, Japan became the fourth most-visited overseas destination for Australians behind New Zealand, Indonesia and India. That year, it ranked as the eight largest source of tourism to Japan, with nearly one million of the 36.8 million visitors that year being from Australia.

== Transport links ==
Qantas, Jetstar, Japan Airlines and All Nippon Airways all offer direct flights between Australia and Japan.

== Multilateral organizations ==
Both nations are members of the Asia-Pacific Economic Cooperation, Comprehensive and Progressive Agreement for Trans-Pacific Partnership, G-20 major economies, Organization for Economic Cooperation and Development, United Nations, International Monetary Fund, World Trade Organization, and among others. Australia and Japan were also part of Trans-Pacific Partnership, for the boost of Indo-Pacific cooperation. Universities in both countries are members of Association of Pacific Rim Universities, an organization founded in 1997.

Since 1989, Japan has been a dialogue partner of the Pacific Islands Forum, which Australia was a founding member of in 1971. The organization was created to serve as a regional body for Pacific Island countries, but did not include island countries near Asia such as Japan and the Philippines. Between the end of World War II and the mid-1980s, Japan had been less politically engaged with geographically-adjacent Micronesian islands, due to the United States gaining control of these islands, with some of the islands later gaining independence from the US beginning in the late 1980s. Japan also viewed the non-US controlled islands in Melanesia and Polynesia as being part of the Commonwealth's zone of influence or Australia and New Zealand's zone of influence, and was merely content with having relations with Australia and New Zealand, rather than developing deep ties with the islands themselves. In 1997, Japan launched the Pacific Islands Leaders Meeting (PALM). This is a summit held every three years between Japan and the Pacific Islands Forum members to discuss regional goals.

== Educational partnerships ==
In 1980, Australia and Japan agreed on a working holiday scheme for young people from both countries. The working holiday program was the first one for Japan.

== Opinion polls ==
According to a 2017 BBC World Service Poll, 78% of Australians view Japan's influence positively, with 17% expressing a negative view, making Australia one of the most pro-Japanese countries in the world.

According to a 2021 poll by the Lowy Institute, Japan is the third most positively viewed country by Australians, with a 73% positivity rating. It ranked behind the United Kingdom and New Zealand. In the 2020 version of the poll, it again ranked at third with a 69% rating, behind the United Kingdom and Canada (New Zealand was not included in the 2020 poll, nor was Canada in the 2021 poll). In the 2022 version of the poll, Japan placed fourth with a 74% rating, behind the United Kingdom which was third with a 77% rating, and Canada and New Zealand, which were the two most favorably viewed countries with ratings of 80% and 86%.

In a 2018 survey by the Japanese government, 65% of respondents had a favorable view of Australia. It was the second most favorably viewed region in the survey, behind the United States, and garnered a higher rating than South Korea, Latin America, Africa, China and Russia, which was the least favorably viewed. 71% of respondents also felt that Japan had a good relationship with Australia, while 74% felt that the future development of relations was important for the two countries and the Asia-Pacific area.

== Twin towns and sister cities ==
As of 2021, Australia has had 112 twin town and sister city affiliations with Japan, with the oldest affiliation dating back to 1963. Japan is currently the country with the highest number of Australian twin town and sister city affiliations. Initiatives between twin towns include the establishment of a Japanese garden in the New South Wales town of Wellington, which housed over 126 different plant species, and which was officially opened in 1999 by Tadao Nakasai, mayor of Wellington's Japanese twin town Ōsawano. The sister cities of Nagoya and Sydney have collaborated on student exchange programs and created relationships between their respective zoos, while the sister cities of Osaka and Melbourne have created strong ties between business agencies, in addition to creating a 5,500 mile yacht race in 1987 called the "Melbourne Osaka Cup". In response to the 1995 earthquake in Kobe, the people of its Australian sister city Brisbane raised $82,000. Conversely, following a 2011 flooding in Brisbane, the Kobe City Government, City Assembly and Kobe City Government Workers' Union donated more than $50,000 to assist in the recovery effort. Many sister cities in Japan also undertook fundraising activities for Australia during the bushfires in 2019-2020. In October 2017, Japanese Consul-General Keizo Takewaka visited several Australian twin towns and sister cities, including Orange, New South Wales (affiliated with Ushiku), Coffs Harbor, New South Wales (affiliated with Sasebo) and Liverpool, New South Wales (affiliated with Toda).

=== Affiliations ===
- Canberra, Australian Capital Territory and Nara, Nara Prefecture (affiliation signed in 1993)
- Armidale, New South Wales and Kanuma, Tochigi Prefecture (affiliation signed in 2001)
- Bathurst, New South Wales and Ōkuma, Fukushima Prefecture (affiliation signed in 1991)
- Rockdale, New South Wales and Yamatsuri, Fukushima Prefecture (affiliation signed in 2000)
- Blue Mountains, New South Wales and Sanda, Hyōgo Prefecture (affiliation signed in 1988)
- Camden, New South Wales and Kashiwa, Chiba Prefecture (affiliation signed in 1997)
- Campbelltown, New South Wales and Koshigaya, Saitama Prefecture (affiliation signed in 1984)
- Canterbury Bankstown, New South Wales and Suita, Osaka Prefecture (affiliation signed in 1989)
- Central Coast, New South Wales and Edogawa, Tokyo Prefecture (affiliation signed in 1988)
- Coffs Harbour, New South Wales and Sasebo, Nagasaki Prefecture (affiliation signed in 1988)
- Dubbo, New South Wales and Minokamo, Gifu Prefecture (affiliation signed in 1989)
- Dubbo, New South Wales and Ōsawano, Toyama Prefecture (affiliation signed in 1992)
- Wellington, New South Wales and Ōsawano, Toyama Prefecture (affiliation signed c. 1999)
- Federation Council, New South Wales and Yokawa, Hyōgo Prefecture (affiliation signed in 1997)
- Georges River, New South Wales and Shiroishi, Miyagi Prefecture (affiliation signed in 1994; inactive)
- Goulbourn, New South Wales and Shibetsu, Hokkaido Prefecture (affiliation signed in 1999)
- Lake Macquarie, New South Wales and Hakodate, Hokkaido Prefecture (affiliation signed in 1992)
- Lake Macquarie, New South Wales and Tanagura, Fukushima Prefecture (affiliation signed in 1994)
- Leeton, New South Wales and Matsuyama, Ehime Prefecture (affiliation signing year unknown)
- Lismore, New South Wales and Yamatotakada, Nara Prefecture (affiliation signed in 1963)
- Liverpool, New South Wales and Toda, Saitama Prefecture (affiliation signed in 1984)
- Newcastle, New South Wales and Ube, Yamaguchi Prefecture (affiliation signed in 1980)
- Manly, New South Wales and Odawara, Kanagawa Prefecture (affiliation signing year unknown)
- Manly, New South Wales and Taitō, Tokyo Prefecture (affiliation signed in 1982)
- Pittwater, New South Wales and Tadaoka, Osaka Prefecture (affiliation signed in 1995)
- Warringah, New South Wales and Chichibu, Saitama Prefecture (affiliation signed in 1996)
- Orange, New South Wales and Ushiku, Ibaraki Prefecture (affiliation signed in 1990)
- Penrith, New South Wales and Fujieda, Shizuoka Prefecture (affiliation signed in 1984)
- Penrith, New South Wales and Hakusan, Ishikawa Prefecture (affiliation signed in 1989)
- Port Macquarie-Hastings, New South Wales and Handa, Aichi Prefecture (affiliation signed in 1990)
- Port Stephens, New South Wales and Kushiro, Hokkaido Prefecture (affiliation signed in 1994)
- Port Stephens, New South Wales and Tateyama, Chiba Prefecture (affiliation signed in 2009)
- Port Stephens, New South Wales and Yugawara, Kanagawa Prefecture (affiliation signed in 1998)
- Queanbeyan, New South Wales and Minami-Alps, Yamanashi Prefecture (affiliation signed in 1992)
- Singleton, New South Wales and Takahata, Yamagata Prefecture (affiliation signed in 2005)
- Cooma, New South Wales and Kamoto, Kumamoto Prefecture (affiliation signed in 1975)
- Snowy Valleys, New South Wales and Kusatsu, Gunma Prefecture (affiliation signed in 1991)
- Sutherland, New South Wales and Chūō, Tokyo Prefecture (affiliation signed in 1991)
- Sydney, New South Wales and Nagoya, Aichi Prefecture (affiliation signed in 1992)
- Tamworth, New South Wales and Sannohe, Aomori Prefecture (affiliation signed in 2001)
- Temora, New South Wales and Izumizaki, Fukushima Prefecture (affiliation signed in 1991)
- Wentworth, New South Wales and Azai, Shiga Prefecture (affiliation signing year unknown)
- Wollongong, New South Wales and Kawasaki, Kanagawa Prefecture (affiliation signed in 2001)
- Central Coast, New South Wales and Tanabe, Wakayama Prefecture (affiliation signed in 1993; ended in 2009)
- Palmerston, Northern Territory and Aridagawa, Wakayama Prefecture (affiliation signed in 2010)
- Brisbane, Queensland and Kobe, Hyōgo Prefecture (affiliation signed in 1985)
- Bundaberg, Queensland and Settsu, Osaka Prefecture (affiliation signed in 1998)
- Cairns, Queensland and Minami, Tokushima Prefecture (affiliation signed in 1969)
- Cairns, Queensland and Oyama, Tochigi Prefecture (affiliation signed in 2006)
- Central Highlands, Queensland and Ichinoseki, Iwate Prefecture (affiliation signing year unknown)
- Fraser Coast, Queensland and Kasukabe, Saitama Prefecture (affiliation signed in 2014)
- Gladstone, Queensland and Saiki, Ōita Prefecture (affiliation signed in 1996)
- Gold Coast, Queensland and Takasu, Hokkaido Prefecture (affiliation signed in 1995)
- Ipswich, Queensland and Nerima, Tokyo Prefecture (affiliation signed in 1994)
- Lockyer Valley, Queensland and Ageo, Saitama Prefecture (affiliation signed in 2014)
- Logan, Queensland and Hirakata, Osaka Prefecture (affiliation signed in 1995)
- Logan, Queensland and Shibukawa, Gunma Prefecture (affiliation signed in 1996)
- Mackay, Queensland and Matsura, Nagasaki Prefecture (affiliation signed in 1989)
- Moreton Bay, Queensland and San'yō-Onoda, Yamaguchi Prefecture (affiliation signed in 1992)
- Noosa, Queensland and Hiji, Ōita Prefecture (affiliation signing year unknown)
- Rockhampton, Queensland and Ibusuki, Kagoshima Prefecture (affiliation signed in 1980)
- Southern Downs, Queensland and Shiwa, Iwate Prefecture (affiliation signed in 1992)
- Sunshine Coast, Queensland and Tatebayashi, Gunma Prefecture (affiliation signed in 1996)
- Toowoomba, Queensland and Takatsuki, Osaka Prefecture (affiliation signed in 1991)
- Townsville, Queensland and Iwaki, Fukushima Prefecture (affiliation signed in 1991)
- Townsville, Queensland and Shunan, Yamaguchi Prefecture (affiliation signed in 1990)
- Townsville, Queensland and Tokuyama, Yamaguchi Prefecture (affiliation signing year unknown)
- Whitsunday, Queensland and Saikai, Nagasaki Prefecture (affiliation signing year unknown)
- Adelaide, South Australia and Himeji, Hyōgo Prefecture (affiliation signed in 1982)
- Barossa Valley, South Australia and Kumenan, Okayama Prefecture (affiliation signed in 2002)
- Clare and Gilbert Valleys, South Australia and Yoshinaga, Okayama Prefecture (affiliation signed in 1990)
- Marion, South Australia and Kokubunji, Tokyo Prefecture (affiliation signed in 1993)
- Port Lincoln, South Australia and Muroto, Kōchi Prefecture (affiliation signed in 1991)
- Salisbury, South Australia and Muroto, Kōchi Prefecture (affiliation signed in 2002)
- Tea Tree Gully, South Australia and Kamagata, Okayama Prefecture (affiliation signed in 2007)
- Holdfast Bay, South Australia and Hayama, Kanagawa Prefecture (affiliation signed in 1997; inactive since 2010)
- Victor Harbor, South Australia and Yatsuka, Okayama Prefecture (affiliation signed c. 1990s; inactive)
- Clarence, Tasmania and Akkeshi, Hokkaido Prefecture (affiliation signed in 1982)
- Devonport, Tasmania and Minamata, Kumamoto Prefecture (affiliation signed in 1996)
- Hobart, Tasmania and Yaizu, Shizuoka Prefecture (affiliation signed in 1977)
- Launceston, Tasmania and Ikeda, Osaka Prefecture (affiliation signed in 1965)
- (Victoria (state)) Ballarat, Victoria and Inagawa, Hyōgo Prefecture (affiliation signed in 1988)
- (Victoria (state)) Brimbank, Victoria and Shiroi, Chiba Prefecture (affiliation signing year unknown)
- (Victoria (state)) Frankston, Victoria and Susono, Shizuoka Prefecture (affiliation signed in 1982)
- (Victoria (state)) Glen Eira, Victoria and Ōgaki, Gifu Prefecture (affiliation signing year unknown)
- (Victoria (state)) Portland, Victoria and Uchiura, Ishikawa Prefecture (affiliation signing year unknown)
- (Victoria (state)) Geelong, Victoria and Izumiōtsu, Osaka Prefecture (affiliation signed in 1992)
- (Victoria (state)) Shepparton, Victoria and Esashi, Iwate Prefecture (affiliation signed in 1979)
- (Victoria (state)) Shepparton, Victoria and Toyoake, Aichi Prefecture (affiliation signed in 2003)
- (Victoria (state)) Hobson's Bay, Victoria and Anjō, Aichi Prefecture (affiliation signed in 1994)
- (Victoria (state)) Latrobe, Victoria and Takasago, Hyōgo Prefecture (affiliation signed in 2000)
- (Victoria (state)) Macedon Ranges, Victoria and Tōkai, Aichi Prefecture (affiliation signed in 1979)
- (Victoria (state)) Shepparton, Victoria and Toyoake, Aichi Prefecture (affiliation signed in 2003)
- (Victoria (state)) Melbourne, Victoria and Osaka, Osaka Prefecture (affiliation signed in 1978)
- (Victoria (state)) Mildura, Victoria and Kumatori, Osaka Prefecture (affiliation signed in 2001)
- (Victoria (state)) Mitchell, Victoria and Honbetsu, Hokkaido Prefecture (affiliation signed in 1991)
- (Victoria (state)) Port Phillip, Victoria and Ōbu, Aichi Prefecture (affiliation signed in 1993)
- (Victoria (state)) Swan Hill, Victoria and Yamagata, Yamagata Prefecture (affiliation signed in 1980)
- (Victoria (state)) Warrnambool, Victoria and Miura, Kanagawa Prefecture (affiliation signed in 1992)
- (Victoria (state)) Whitehorse, Victoria and Matsudo, Chiba Prefecture (affiliation signed in 1971)
- (Victoria (state)) Wyndham, Victoria and Chiryū, Aichi Prefecture (affiliation signed in 2000)
- Albany, Western Australia and Tomioka, Gunma Prefecture (affiliation signed in 2001)
- Belmont, Western Australia and Adachi, Tokyo Prefecture (affiliation signed in 1984)
- Broome, Western Australia and Taiji, Wakayama Prefecture (affiliation signed in 1981)
- Bunbury, Western Australia and Setagaya, Tokyo Prefecture (affiliation signed in 1992)
- Busselton, Western Australia and Sugito, Saitama Prefecture (affiliation signed in 1996)
- Fremantle, Western Australia and Yokosuka, Kanagawa Prefecture (affiliation signed in 1979)
- Geraldton, Western Australia and Kosai, Shizuoka Prefecture (affiliation signed in 1998)
- Melville, Western Australia and Takarazuka, Hyōgo Prefecture (affiliation signing year unknown)
- Perth, Western Australia and Kagoshima, Kagoshima Prefecture (affiliation signed in 1978)
- Rockingham, Western Australia and Akō, Hyōgo Prefecture (affiliation signed in 1997)
- Swan, Western Australia and Inami, Toyama Prefecture (affiliation signed in 2006; inactive since 2019)

== See also ==
- Foreign relations of Australia
- Foreign relations of Japan
- List of ambassadors of Australia to Japan
- List of ambassadors of Japan to Australia
- Japanese Australian
- Quadrilateral Security Dialogue
- Reciprocal Access Agreement

== Literature ==
Academic works

- Cuffe, Honae (2021). The Genesis of a Policy: Defining and Defending Australia's National Interest in the Asia-Pacific, 1921–57 (PDF). ANU Press. ISBN 9781760464684.
- Day, David (1992). Reluctant Nation: Australia and the Allied Defeat of Japan, 1942–1945. New York: Oxford University Press. ISBN 0-19-553242-2.
- Horner, David (1982). High Command. Australia and Allied strategy 1939–1945. Sydney: Allen & Unwin with the assistance of the Australian War Memorial. ISBN 0-86861-076-3.
- Horner, David (May 1993). "Defending Australia in 1942". War & Society. 11 (1): 1–21. doi:10.1179/072924793791198886.
- Horner, David (2002). "The Evolution of Australian Higher Command Arrangements". Command Papers. Centre for Defence Leadership Studies, Australian Defence College. Archived from the original (doc) on 16 July 2012.
- Tow, William T.; Kersten, Rikki, eds. (2012). Bilateral Perspectives on Regional Security: Australia, Japan and the Asia-Pacific Region. Palgrave Macmillan.
- David Walton, "Australia, Japan and the Region" in Mari Pangestu and Ligang Song (Eds.), Japan's future in East Asia and the Pacific (Canberra : Asia Pacific Press, 2007) pp. 31–53.

Official publications

- Joint Ministerial Statement, Australia-Japan, 'Building a Comprehensive Strategic Relationship', Sydney, 18 March 2006, foreignminister.gov.au
- Japan-Australia Joint Declaration on Security Cooperation, Tokyo, 13 March 2007,
- 安全保障協力に関する日豪共同宣言(仮訳), Tokyo, 13 March 2007, mofa.go.jp
- Strengthening Australia-Japan Economic Relations: A report prepared by Professor Gordon de Brouwer (Australian National University) and Dr. Tony Warren (Network Economics Consulting Group) for the Department of Foreign Affairs and Trade, April 2001
