= List of ambassadors of Japan to Australia =

Ambassador of Japan to Australia
- Incumbent; Kazuhiro Suzuki since 1 March 2023
- Style: His Excellency
- Appointer: Naruhito
- Inaugural holder: Tatsuo Kawai
- Formation: 2 January 1941
- Website: Embassy of Japan in Australia

The ambassador of Japan to Australia is an officer of the Japanese Ministry of Foreign Affairs and the head of the Embassy of Japan to the Commonwealth of Australia. The position has the rank and status of an ambassador extraordinary and plenipotentiary and holds non-resident accreditation for Fiji and Papua New Guinea. The ambassador is based at the embassy at 112 Empire Circuit, Yarralumla in Canberra. The Ambassador is currently Kazuhiro Suzuki.

Japan and Australia have enjoyed full diplomatic relations since 1941 when Tatsuo Kawai was appointed Envoy Extraordinary and Minister Plenipotentiary of Japan to Australia, although relations were severed after less than a year owing to the outbreak of the Pacific War in December 1941. Relations were restored in 1952 and have continued since then.

== Office-holders ==
=== Minister ===
Incumbent	Start of term	End of term	Notes
Tatsuo Kawai	2 January 1941	7 December 1941	
Suspension of relations

=== Ambassadors, 1952–present ===
Incumbent	Start of term	End of term	Notes
Haruhiko Nishi	10 September 1952	14 June 1955	
Tadakatsu Suzuki	14 June 1955	11 March 1959	
Katsushiro Narita	March 1959	7 April 1961	
Saburo Ohta	7 April 1961	30 December 1965	
Koh Chiba	30 December 1965	18 August 1967	
Fumihiko Kai	18 August 1967	5 December 1969	
Shizuo Saito	5 December 1969	7 August 1973	
Kenzo Yoshida	7 August 1973	20 January 1976	
Yoshio Okawara	20 January 1976	February 1980	
Mizuo Kuroda	April 1980	October 1982	
Kensuke Yanagiya	2 December 1982	December 1984	
Toshijiro Nakajima	December 1984	August 1987	
Kenichi Yanagi	November 1987	March 1990	
Hiromu Fukada	March 1990	7 February 1992	
Kazutoshi Hasegawa	7 February 1992	1996	
Yukio Satoh	1996	1998	
Masaji Takahashi	September 1998	January 2001	
Atsushi Hatakenaka	January 2001	September 2003	
Kenzo Oshima	September 2003	December 2004	
Hideaki Ueda	January 2005	September 2007	
Takaaki Kojima	September 2007	July 2010	
Shigekazu Sato	July 2010	November 2012	
Yoshitaka Akimoto	November 2012	April 2015	
Sumio Kusaka	April 2015	January 2019	
Reiichiro Takahashi	January 2019	December 2020	
Shingo Yamagami	February 2021	March 2023	
Kazuhiro Suzuki	March 2023	Present	

== See also ==
- List of ambassadors of Australia to Japan
