= Stockwin =

Stockwin is a surname. Notable people with the surname include:

- Arthur Stockwin (born 1937), British political scientist
- Julian Stockwin (born 1944), English writer
