= Basic Treaty of Friendship and Cooperation =

1976 treaty between Australia and Japan

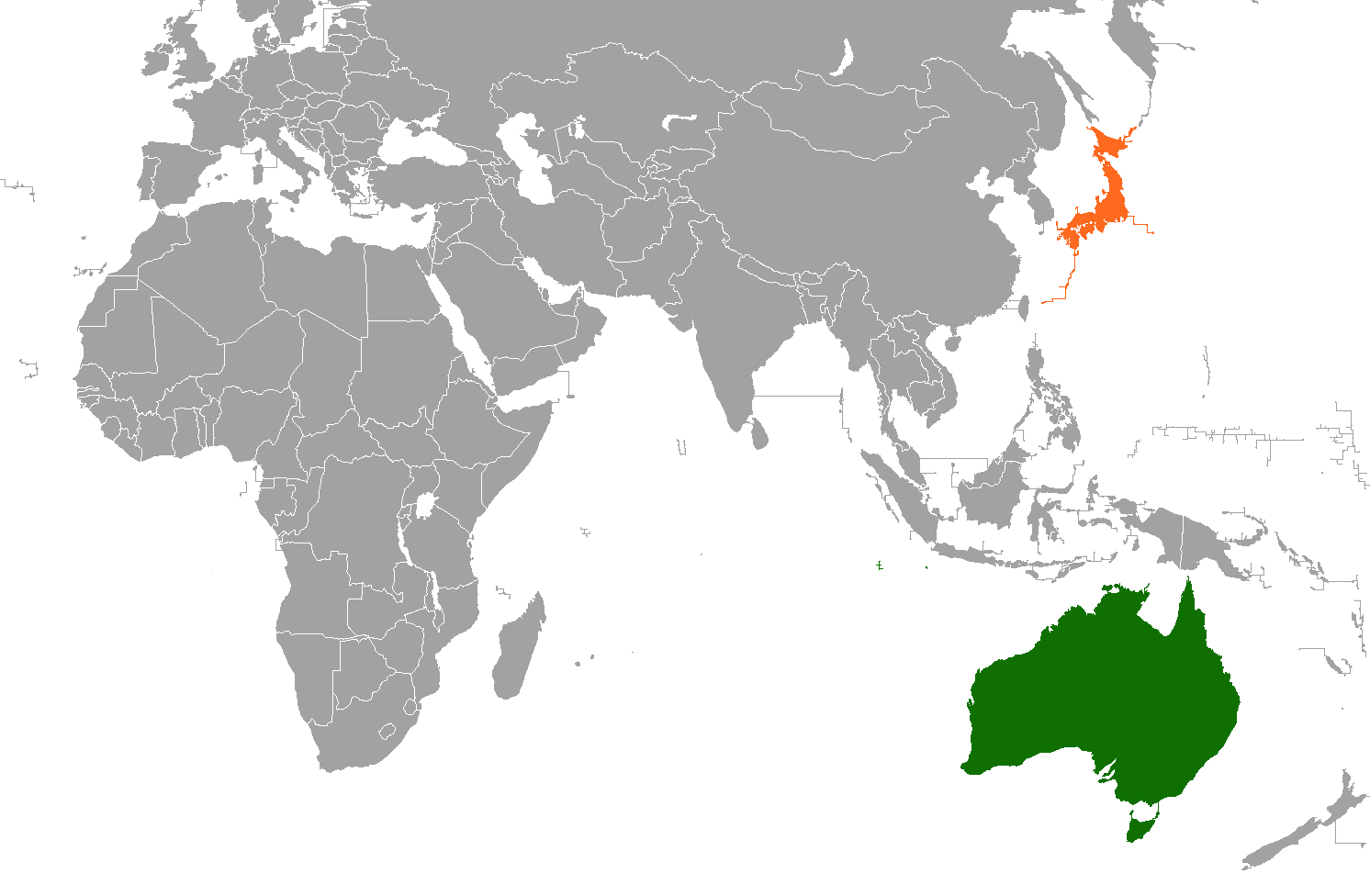
- Type: Bilateral treaty
- Signed: 16 June 1976
- Location: Tokyo, Japan
- Effective: 21 August 1977
- Condition: Ratification by Australia and Japan
- Signatories: Australia; Japan
- Depositaries: Australian Government and Japanese Government
- Languages: English, Japanese

The Basic Treaty of Friendship and Cooperation (nicknamed the NARA Treaty) was a treaty signed between Australia and Japan that established a broad framework of principles to guide and enhance future bilateral relations in the political, economic, cultural and other fields. The treaty is historically significant because it is the first comprehensive treaty of its kind for both countries alike, containing both symbolic and practical provisions which acknowledged indispensable economic ties. The treaty was signed on 16 June 1976 by Prime Minister Malcolm Fraser and Prime Minister Takeo Miki, and entered into force 21 August 1977.

For Japan, the treaty was an essential step for their modern economic development as an emerging power amongst established industrial nations. On the Australian side, the vision was to refashion a politically ambivalent relationship and promote the natural commercial partnership between the countries.

Both sides started from vastly different premises on the nature of the treaty to be negotiated. While Japan insisted on an encompassing Friendship, Commerce and Navigation (FCN) type treaty, Australia preferred bilateral agreements on very specific matters of mutual interest. The primary area of contention during treaty negotiations lay in the retrospective and prospective interpretations of the Most Favoured Nation (MFN) clause that was resolved by formulating a new approach to phrasing. The prolonged period of negotiations constituted an intensive learning process for both sides to resolve a unique set of problems that ultimately produced an equitable and mutually advantageous agreement.

== Historical context ==
=== Japan ===
An integral aspect to Japan's modernisation was the negotiation of Treaties of Friendship, Commerce and Navigation (FCN Treaties) as a means of gaining economic parity with the established colonial powers. After the Meiji Restoration, Japan's industrial development was hindered by the Unequal Treaties imposed by the Imperial Powers in the 19th and early 20th centuries which restricted their access to world markets. The FCN treaties were used as a policy tool to redress the harsh terms of the Unequal Treaties and allow Japan to gain its rightful position amongst the major economic powers. Japan's historical sensitivity about being treated equally underscored their strong devotion to negotiating a FCN type treaty with Australia that would give them "formal assurances of its rights as an economic partner".

=== Australia ===
In contrast to Japan, the origins of Australia's modernization arose under much more favourable conditions as she enjoyed preferential access to the then largest market of the period; Britain. The country's close political ties with Britain created discrimination against other countries in areas beyond trade such as people movement, evidenced by the White Australia immigration policies. Although the White Australia policies have become obsolete, the deep historical linkages which favoured Britain remained embedded in Australian institutions until the time of the NARA treaty (Drysdale, 2006, p492).

The economic pragmatism that characterised the international sphere after World War II facilitated the beginning of a burgeoning resource trade relationship between Australia and Japan which was formalised by the 1975 Agreement on Commerce. Increasing economic interdependence between the two countries in the 1970s, however, gave impetus towards expanding agreements beyond trade towards other issues such as immigration and investment. Moreover, Japanese perceptions of discriminatory Australian policies were beginning to put a strain on the stability of the bilateral relationship. This impediment to the relationship is evidenced by the statement made by the head of the Japanese Ministry of International Trade and Industry, Naohiro Amaya, "it is very unpleasant and inconvenient that Australia imposes discriminatory and insulting restrictions on the entry of Japanese technicians and skilled labourers,". These economic and political pressures culminated in a recognition that Australia's bilateral framework for relations and agreements with Japan needed to be reappraised.

== Genesis ==
=== Phase I ===
The first proposal for a FCN treaty was raised by the Japanese delegation in May 1970 at the eighth annual meeting of the Australia-Japan Business Cooperation Committee (AJBCC). A more formal request was raised in October at the Australia-Japan Official Level Talks and then reaffirmed by the Japanese Ambassador in Canberra in 1971 who asked that the prospect of a treaty be "seriously looked at". In response, a Standing Inter-Departmental Committee on Japan (IDCJ) was established, bringing together officials from all Departments to examine the matter.

Although the departments were receptive to the politically symbolic aspects of a FCN treaty, the report presented to the IDCJ in early 1972 indicated a consensus that the practical problems outweighed the advantages. Australia generally eschewed FCN treaties due to previous difficulties encountered in concluding one with the United States. The traditional approach with Japan was agreements on specific matters on an ad hoc basis such as the Civil Aviation Agreement of 1956, the Double Taxation Agreement of 1970 and the Cultural Agreement of 1975. Additionally there were concerns that the commercial obligations of an FCN treaty would overlap with other international agreements such as the General Agreement on Tariffs and Trade (GATT) of which Australia and Japan were member states.

During November 1971 to September 1972, the Australian Senate Standing Committee on Foreign Affairs and Defence conducted an inquiry about the Japanese-Australian relationship. One strong advocate was Sir John Crawford, the Vice-Chancellor of Australian National University and one of the authors of the 1957 Commerce Agreement. Sir John Crawford gave resounding evidence for the inadequacies in Australia's ad hoc approach and suggested an ‘umbrella treaty’ that provided a framework of principles to base negotiation of specific agreements. The Committee approved of Sir John Crawford's conclusions as in January 1973 in its overall report, it stated "that a treaty framework could be devised which would confer equal and mutual benefits to both parties".

=== Phase II ===
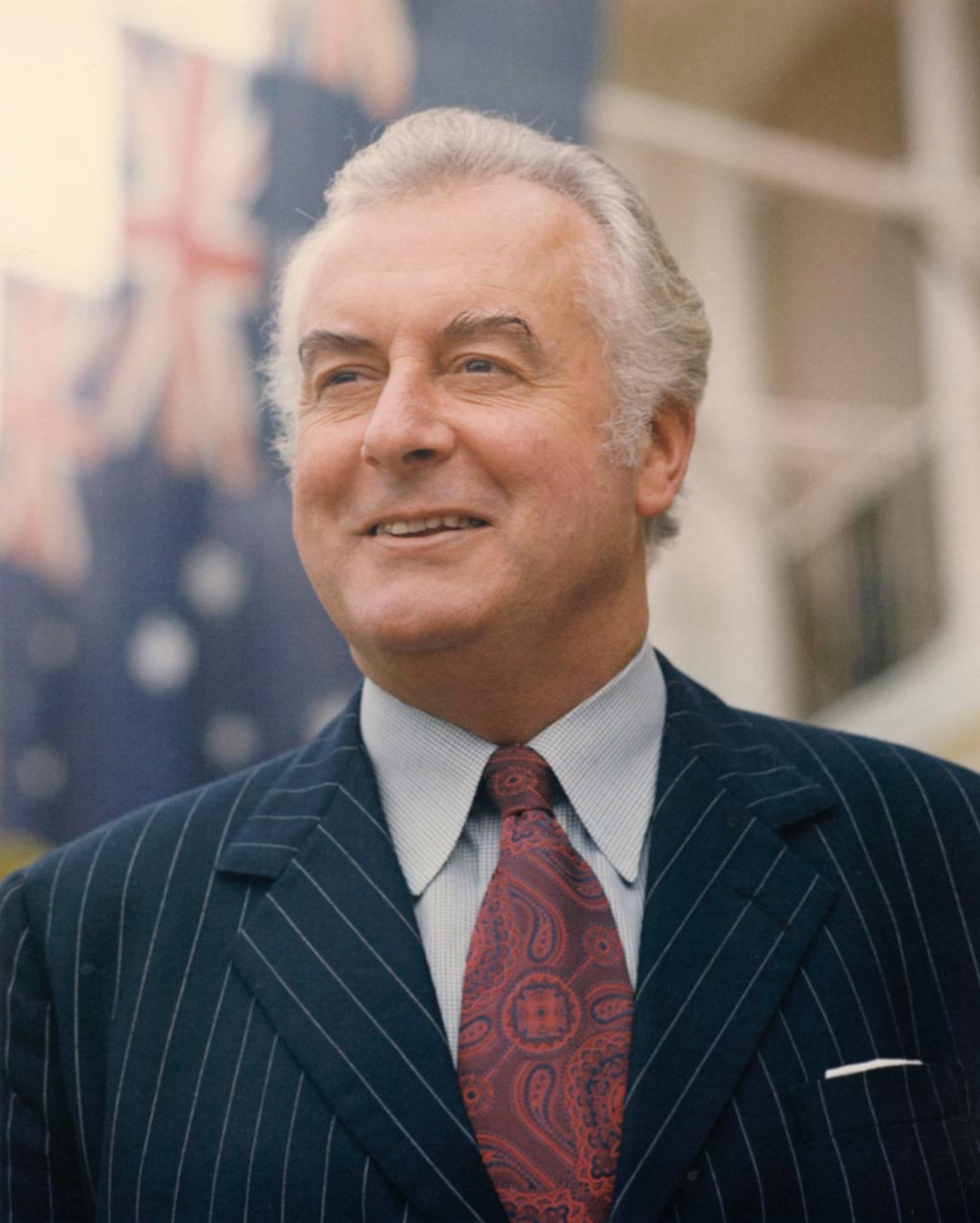
Prime Minister Gough Whitlam

The advent of the Whitlam government in December 1972 brought the agenda of forging a revitalised diplomacy in the Asia-Pacific and getting rid of the remnants of a White Australia past. The new Prime Minister Gough Whitlam was very impressed by Sir John's arguments and instructed the IDCJ for a reappraisal of their earlier report. The reviews prepared by the IDCJ in May 1973 echoed earlier negative conclusions for the undesirability of a traditional FCN treaty. The committee, however, cognisant of the Whitlam agenda to bring Australia-Japan relations towards a closer basis, put forth the possibility of a ‘symbolic’ or ‘limited’ treaty that could be called a treaty of friendship and cooperation. In light of the committee's responses, a small team of officers from the Department of Foreign Affairs (DFA) were assembled to produce a draft treaty and accompanying report which was completed mid-July. On the basis of this draft and report, Whitlam notified the Japanese at the ministerial consultations held in Tokyo, October 1973 of the Australian Government's willingness to negotiate a treaty. In the joint communique issued at the end of the ministerial committee meetings, Whitlam and the Japanese Prime Minister, Masayoshi Ohira agreed that the two Governments would begin discussions on a broad bilateral treaty.

== Treaty Negotiations ==
=== Initial drafts ===
With the DFA in the coordinating role, amendments by the departments to the preliminary Australian draft treaty began in November, 1973. The objective during revisions was to avoid using the language of traditional FCN-type treaties, focusing instead on keeping the language general and low-key. The amended draft was submitted to Cabinet on 10 December and transmissioned to Tokyo on 14 December. In January, 1974, a small delegation team headed by Michael Cook, First Assistant Secretary, North and South Asia Division, DFA, was set up to handle the negotiations with Japan.

The Japanese reaction to the first Australian draft was some disappointment at the lack of legally enforceable guarantees in matters of economic substance and an excess of declarative language. Additionally in April, 1974 during meetings with the Gaimusho officers in Tokyo, Cook learnt that the Japanese opposed the treaty being named the Treaty of NARA as suggested by Prime Minister Whitlam to represent Nippon-Australia relations. Opposition was based on the fact that the use of geographical titles were reserved for Japan's historically significant treaties thus, it was arranged that ‘NARA Treaty’ would instead be the agreed nickname.

The official Japanese draft treaty was given to Australia on 6 May 1974 and was generally similar to the Australian draft in that it integrated much of the same subjects and was also written in broad ‘best endeavour’ terms. Japanese objectives evident through the draft treaty were; a free market philosophy and FCN-type provisions in regard to entry, stay and investment. The apparent emphasis on economic guarantees was the cause of much difficulty during interdepartmental meetings held to produce a draft revision. However, these were overcome and a ‘reasonable revision’ was produced and forwarded to the Japanese on 17 July 1974.

=== Difficulty in negotiations ===
The second negotiation round in Canberra proceeded from 28 January to 4 February 1975. It was in this round of meetings that the negotiation process hit a major snag due to highly divergent interpretations of the meaning of MFN treatment. The Japanese brought a retrospective interpretation to MFN treatment, which would have entitled Japanese firms to claim benefits afforded to foreign firms in the past by Australian policies that were no longer in operation. Under this interpretation it was expected that at least one Japanese automobile company could establish a wholly owned subsidiary in Australia under the same conditions General Motors was established in 1948, which was unacceptable to Australia. The Australian interpretation was that the MFN commitment would apply prospectively, meaning that Australia was only bound to entitle Japan nationals and companies with the same benefits being accorded at the time of application. The second round adjourned, with hopes being dashed that the treaty would be ready in time for signature when Prime Minister Takeo Miki visited near the end of February.

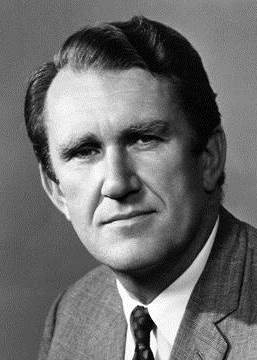
Prime Minister Malcolm Fraser

In a new set of proposals received in April 1975, the Japanese appeared to concede on the retrospectivity interpretation, putting forth a new phraseology for Articles VII and IX that would solve the contentious situation. Instead of the traditional MFN formula of "treatment no less favourable" it could be replaced by the concept of ‘fair and equitable treatment’ and ‘non-discrimination’ accorded by the contracting party to any third country. The ‘expressions’ of MFN treatment were further clarified in an informal meeting at the Gaimusho between Ashton Calvert, Secretary of the Australian embassy in Tokyo and Tadayuki Nonoyama, a member of the Japanese delegation. What was agreed in the meeting came to be accepted by both sides to be integrated into the final treaty.

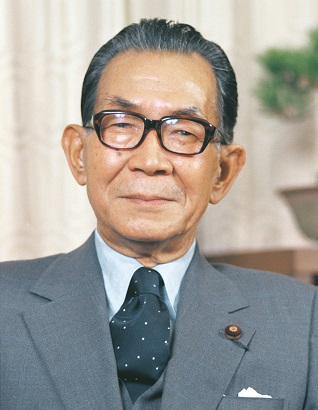
Prime Minister Takeo Miki in 1974

=== Final phase ===
In November, 1975, Cook left the negotiating team to take up a post in London and was succeeded by Gary Woodard, who positively influenced the tense atmosphere of negotiations. Woodard believed that the bureaucrats had "now become too timid on the matter" due to the prolonged period of negotiations and he set about bringing a fresh outlook on the problems that were stalling negotiations.

Moreover, the new change in government in November, saw the new Prime Minister Malcolm Fraser give high priority to the rapid conclusion of the treaty. A congratulatory call by Japanese Prime Minister Miki, prompted Fraser to instruct the departments "to get over their bureaucratic quibbling and ‘legalistic nit-picking’" in order to maintain the momentum of negotiations. Two more rounds of negotiations, one in April, 1976 and the other in May, were held to settle outstanding issues of phrasing and interpretation. On 16 June 1976, Prime Minister Malcolm Fraser and Prime Minister Takeo Miki signed the Basic Treaty of Friendship and Cooperation between Australia and Japan, after two and a half years of negotiations.

== Substance of the Treaty ==
=== Preamble ===
The Preamble of the treaty acknowledges the interdependence between the two countries and recognises that co-operation should not only be to their mutual benefit but also in the common interest of other countries in the Asian and Pacific region.

=== Article I ===
Article I defines the objective of an umbrella treaty that is; to promote understanding and develop co-operation on all matters of mutual interest.

=== Article II ===
Article II relates the treaty to the Principles of the Charter of the United Nations

=== Article III ===
Article III lists the areas where cooperation and understanding should be facilitated including, "the political, economic, labour relations, human rights, legal, scientific, technological, social, cultural, professional, sporting and environmental fields"

=== Article IV ===
Article IV affirms both countries’ trade commitments in accordance with the principles of multilateral agreements to which the countries are member states, such as the General Agreement on Tariffs and Trade.

=== Article V, VI & VII ===
Articles V, VI and VII are interrelated articles, with Article V prescribing the general principle that economic relations be developed on the basis of mutual benefit and trust. Article V recognises the countries’ mutual interest in "being a stable and reliable supplier to and market for the other". In accordance with the provisions of Article V, Article VI emphasises the importance of trade in mineral resources and Article VII covers assurances in the exchange of capital and technology.

=== Article VIII and IX ===
Articles VIII and IX are considered to be the substantive core of the treaty which provide for fair, equitable and non-discriminatory treatment to the "nationals of the other Contracting Party and the nationals of any third country". Article VIII accords this treatment to matters of migration and stay and Article IX accords this treatment to business and professional activities including investment.

=== Article X ===
Article X states that international shipping activities between the two countries be developed on a fair and mutually advantageous basis.

=== Article XI, XII, XIII and XIV ===
Article XI-XIV are the general "machinery clauses", calling for periodical reviews of the treaty.

=== Protocol ===
The Protocol outlines the various provisions considered to be integral aspects of the treaty.

=== Exchange of Notes ===
The Exchange of Notes confirms that the operation of the treaty does not apply to non-metropolitan areas of Australia and lists the "supplementary provisions" in the treatment of persons temporarily residing in Australia.

=== Agreed Minutes ===
The Agreed Minutes describes the various interpretations of the articles in the treaty. Most importantly, it prescribes the standard of most-favoured-nation treatment to the provisions made in Article VIII and Article IX.

== Assessments of the treaty's significance ==
Critical assessments of the treaty have suggested that it had no real concrete impact upon the course of the bilateral relationship due to the lack of legally enforceable provisions. It has been argued in an article by academic Rajaram Panda that the treaty is regarded as a mere "ornament" that glorifies the existing relationship between the two countries. This perspective is echoed in another article assessing the treaty's significance by British political scientist, Arthur Stockwin who contends that the treaty was never meant to substantially alter behaviour only to ratify existing practices of friendship and co-operation whilst providing for "guarantees of predictability in certain areas of the relationship". The Australian Financial Review in 1976 also gave criticism by labelling the treaty as a scrap of paper that was only "an expression of sentiment at the highest level in both countries". Moreover, it has been said that the treaty has rarely been invoked and in the cases that it has been attempted, was rendered ineffective. This is evidenced in a recount by John Button, Minister for Industry, Technology and Commerce of an attempt by the Australian delegation at the Ministerial Committee meeting in 1985 to invoke the treaty, that was met by no direct response on the Japanese side and thus, "The Treaty of Nara went back into its pigeon-hole".

Other evaluations of the treaty point to the fact that it is the first bilateral treaty of its kind, in a number of respects. In a monograph about the treaty prepared by historian Moreen Dee, it states that for Australia it was the most comprehensive agreement that she had ever negotiated and for Japan the treaty's scope was much broader than those of its traditional FCN-type treaties. Dee affirms that the significance of the treaty was in the assurances of a high standard of treatment that were non-discriminatory as well as in the provisions of MFN treatment. In another article for the Asia Pacific Economic Papers, Dee asserts that questions about the substantial and measurable impact of the treaty are "largely irrelevant" because the real value of the treaty is its symbolic demonstration of the efforts by both Governments to strengthen the bilateral relationship. Another perspective by political scientist, Takashi Terada, mentions how the treaty was significant because it officially dispelled Australia's negative perceptions of Japan during the Pacific War. Moreover, in an article assessing the economic impact of the treaty, Peter Drysdale, an Australian economist, concludes that the treaty did have a significant effect upon the intensity of trade and investment flows as well as people movement between the two countries.

== See also ==
- Australia–Japan relations

== Reference list ==
- "Basic Treaty of Friendship and Co-operation between Australia and Japan | DFAT". www.dfat.gov.au. Retrieved 27 May 2020
- Dee, Moreen. (2006). Friendship and co-operation the 1976 Basic Treaty between Australia and Japan. Department of Foreign Affairs and Trade. ISBN 1-920959-88-2. OCLC 800853656.
- Drysdale, Peter (2006). "Did the NARA Treaty make a difference?". Australian Journal of International Affairs. 60 (4): 490–505. doi:10.1080/10357710601006994. ISSN 1035-7718.
- Gallagher (2012). "The Basic Treaty of Friendship Between Australia and Japan" (PDF). Australia Japan Business Cooperation Committee, 50th Anniversary Souvenir Book. Chapter 4: 38–41.
- Miller, Geoff (2006). "Australia–Japan economic relations: ten years after the NARA Treaty". Australian Journal of International Affairs. 60 (4): 506-520. doi:10.1080/10357710601007000. ISSN 1035-7718.
- Panda, Rajaram (1982). "The Basic Treaty of Friendship and Co-Operation between Japan and Australia: A Perspective". International Studies. 21 (3): p 305-321. doi:10.1177/0020881782021003002. ISSN 0020-8817.
- Ph. D., History; J. D., University of Washington School of Law; B. A., History. "Unequal Treaties in Early Modern Asian History". ThoughtCo. Retrieved 26 May 2020.
- Stockwin, Arthur (2004). "Negotiating the basic treaty between Australia and Japan, 1973-1976". Japanese Studies. 24 (2): 201-214. doi:10.1080/1037139042000302500. ISSN 1037-1397.
- Terada, Takashi (2006). "Thirty years of the Australia–Japan partnership in Asian regionalism: evolution and future directions". Australian Journal of International Affairs. 60 (4): 536-551. doi:10.1080/10357710601007026. ISSN 1035-7718.
- Woodard, Garry, 1929- (2007). Negotiating the Australia-Japan Basic Treaty of Friendship and Cooperation: reflections and afterthoughts. Australia-Japan Research Center, Crawford School of Economics & Government, ANU College of Asia and the Pacific. ISBN 978-0-86413-317-5. OCLC 154953946.
