= Tatsuo Kawai =

Japanese diplomat and author

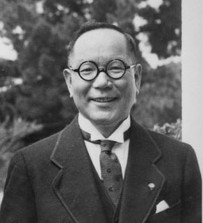
- Tatsuo Kawai, c. 1941
- Born: 26 July 1889; Fukuyama, Hiroshima, Japan
- Died: 31 October 1965 (aged 76); Japan
- Occupations: Diplomat, author
- Employer: Foreign Ministry

Tatsuo Kawai (河相 達夫, Kawai Tatsuo; 26 July 1889 – 31 October 1965) was a Japanese diplomat and author. He was a leading proponent of expansionism in Japan before World War II but later became a pacifist and was Japan's first Minister to Australia.

== Early years ==
Kawai was born in Fukuyama, Hiroshima Prefecture, and he graduated from Tokyo Imperial University in 1915. He passed the diplomatic service examination in 1918 and was appointed vice-consul to Jinan, China in 1919. He was promoted in 1921 and served as Secretary to the Japanese Embassy in Washington, D.C., and then Secretary to the Department of Commerce in 1921. He became the Japanese Consul to Vancouver in 1925 and Qingdao in 1928. He became Chief of the Foreign Department of the Kwantung Leased Territory in 1930 and Secretary to the Japanese Advisor to the Lytton Commission of the League of Nations.

He was appointed Consul-General to Canton in 1934 and Shanghai in 1938. Kawai was an ardent expansionist and in 1938 published The Goal of Japanese Expansion, which was published in Japanese, English and Russian, and the following year translated into Spanish. In 1938 he also published 支那事変と帝国外交 (The China Incident and Imperial Diplomacy), which was only available in Japanese.

In 1938 he was promoted to Director of the Information Bureau and official spokesman for the Foreign Ministry in Tokyo. In 1939 he served briefly as Japanese Envoy Extraordinary and Minister Plenipotentiary to Europe and the United States before returning to Japan. Sir Robert Craigie, British Ambassador to Japan, later noted that "during his term of office as official 'spokesman' ... he displayed on several occasions open hostility to our attitude as regards Japanese actions in China and he was unpopular amongst the foreign newspaper correspondents owing to his somewhat rough manner and indifferent command of English". After leading a strike at the Foreign Ministry in 1940, he was sacked as an official spokesman but was appointed roving ambassador to Nazi-occupied Europe. It was during this appointment he became a pacifist.

== Minister to Australia ==
Kawai's appointment to his new position as Japan's first Envoy Extraordinary and Minister Plenipotentiary to Australia was officially announced on 2 January 1941; he arrived in Australia on 13 March of the same year. Kawai developed a close friendship with future Prime Minister of Australia John Curtin. In early 1941, when Curtin was still Leader of the Opposition, they reached an agreement to boost trade and to allow Japanese access to iron ore in Western Australia in exchange for Japan "guaranteeing Australia's safety". In July 1941, Time quoted Kawai as saying he was tired of hearing the word "drive" to describe Japan's intentions and that territorial expansion was an old-fashioned phrase.

Telegram from Kawai to John Curtin expressing sympathy at the loss of HMAS Sydney.

He was the guest of honour at a formal dinner held by Curtin in Perth and dined privately with the Curtins many times. He was also a guest at The Lodge after Curtin became Prime Minister, and at the opening of the Australian War Memorial in Canberra on 11 November 1941. He sent a telegram to Curtin expressing his sympathy at the loss of HMAS Sydney on 1 December 1941, only days before Australia declared war on Japan. Some authors believe that the telegram was sent on 27 November 1941, based on the number "27" that appears in the first line of typed text. This appears not to be correct. The entry "X 15 SYDNEY" identifies the Office of Origin, the numeral "27" the number of words used (H M A S amounting to four words), and the entry "11-57 AM" is the time the telegram was lodged. These entries coincide with the headings above them.

== World War II ==
Kawai warned Curtin at the conclusion of the American–Japanese talks in Washington, D.C., that "the momentum may have gone too far" to prevent war, prompting Curtin to recall his War Cabinet on 5 December 1941. Kawai was kept under house arrest at the Japanese embassy at the outbreak of the Pacific War and deported to Japan in August 1942, taking with him the ashes of four of the Japanese submariners killed in the attack on Sydney Harbour.

Kawai was ostracised in Japan when he called on Japanese not to hate Australians and was sacked from the Foreign Ministry. Towards the end of the war he secretly worked for peace with Shigeru Yoshida. Immediately after the war he became vice foreign minister under Yoshida.

== Later life ==
After the war he became head of the Japan Australia Society, an organisation promoting trade and friendship between the two countries. He resumed contact with the Curtin family, visiting John Curtin's grave in 1959.

He died in 1965. His son, Masumi Kawai, became managing director of Mitsui's Australian subsidiary, Mitsui Australia.

== Publications ==
- 支那を如何に觀察すべきか (Shina o ika ni kansatsusubeki ka), 1937^{[Translation required]}
- The goal of Japanese expansion (English), Hokuseido Press, Tokyo, 1938. (Reprinted: Greenwood Press, Westport, 1973)
- (Tseli iaponskoi ekspansii), (Russian), JuMZD, 1938.
- 發展日本の目標 : アジア體制への道 (Hatten Nihon no mokuhyō: Ajia taisei e no michi), 中央公論社, Tōkyo, 1938^{[Translation required]}
- 支那事変と帝国外交 (Shina Jihen to Teikoku gaiko, The China Incident and Imperial Diplomacy), 1938
- 事變解决の根本は何處にありや (Jihen kaiketsu no konpon wa doko ni ari ya), 青年日本運動, 1938^{[Translation required]}
- Las finalidades de la expansión Japonesa (Spanish translation), Santiago de Chile [s.n.], 1939.
