= Kazuhiro Suzuki (ambassador) =

Japanese diplomat (born 1961)

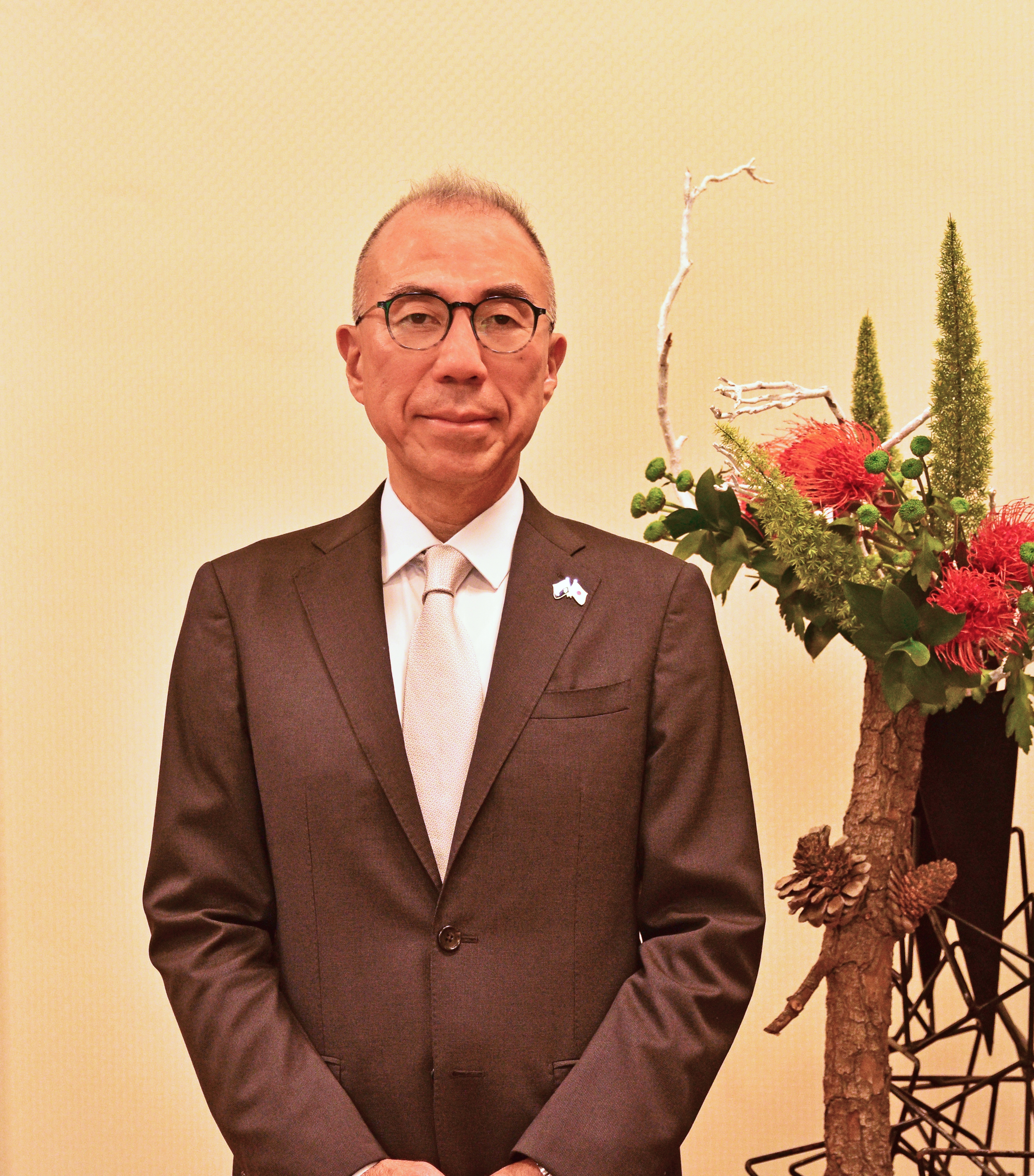

28th Japan Ambassador to Australia
- Incumbent
- Assumed office March 1, 2025
- Preceded by: Shingo Yamagami

Personal details
- Born: April 11, 1961 (age 65) Tokyo, Japan
- Education: University of Tokyo
- Profession: Diplomat

Kazuhiro Suzuki (Japanese: 鈴木 量博, born 11 April 1961) is a Japanese diplomat. After serving as Director-General of the North American Affairs Bureau at the Ministry of Foreign Affairs and as Ambassador Extraordinary and Plenipotentiary to Turkey, he currently serves as Ambassador Extraordinary and Plenipotentiary to Australia.
