= Arthur Stockwin =

British political scientist (1935–2026)

James Arthur Ainscow Stockwin OBE (28 November 1935 – 7 January 2026) was a British political scientist who specialised in the politics and foreign policy of Japan. During his career, he authored many books and articles. Prior to his retirement in 2003, he taught for 21 years at the University of Oxford and for 17 years at the Australian National University.

== Early life ==
Arthur Stockwin was born in Birmingham on 28 November 1935. He obtained a BA in Philosophy, Politics and Economics from the University of Oxford and learned Russian through an army course during national service, after which he obtained a PhD in International Relations from the Australian National University in Canberra. He initially intended to conduct post-graduate research on Russia but instead decided to switch to Japanese politics and foreign policy. His thesis was titled "The Neutralist Policy of the Japanese Socialist Party". His supervisor at ANU was David Sissons.

== Career ==
From 1964 to 1981, Stockwin taught in the Political Science department at the Australian National University and conducted research on the politics and foreign policy of Japan. In 1982, he was appointed the first Nissan Professor of Modern Japanese Studies at the University of Oxford and became the founding director of the Nissan Institute of Japanese Studies. In his inaugural lecture at the University of Oxford on January 27, 1983, he commented that the establishment of the Nissan Institute "opened the way to an expansion in Oxford of modern Japanese studies on a scale that might have seemed incredible only a few years earlier."

Stockwin's published works covered a broad sweep of Japanese politics, economy, government and foreign policy. His books include The Japanese Socialist Party and Neutralism (1968), Governing Japan (1975, 1982, 1989, 2008), Dynamic and Immobilist Politics in Japan (1988), Dictionary of the Modern Politics of Japan (2003), The Writings of J.A.A. Stockwin (2 vols., 2012), Rethinking Japan: The Politics of Contested Nationalism (2017), Towards Japan: A Personal Journey (2020), and The Failure of Political Opposition in Japan: Implications for Democracy and a Vision of the Future (2023). Stockwin was also the editor of the Nissan Institute/Routledge Japanese Studies series for many years, which has published more than 100 book titles related to Japan. From 1994 to 1995, he was President of the British Association of Japanese Studies. Stockwin retired from Oxford in 2003 and subsequently became an Emeritus Fellow at St Antony's College and the Nissan Institute of Japanese Studies.

== Death ==
Stockwin died on 7 January 2026, at the age of 90.

== Honours ==
In 2004, Stockwin was presented with The Order of the Rising Sun, Gold Rays with Neck Ribbon by ambassador to London Yoshiji Nogami on behalf of the Emperor of Japan for his efforts to promote Japanese Studies in the United Kingdom. In 2006, a festschrift was published in his honour, The Left in the Shaping of Japanese Democracy: Essays in Honour of J.A.A. Stockwin, edited by David Williams and Rikki Kersten. Stockwin was awarded the Order of the British Empire in 2009 for "services to academic excellence and the promotion of UK-Japanese understanding." The same year, he received the Japan Foundation Award for "his contributions to the development of Japanese Studies in the United Kingdom through his achievements in modern Japanese political studies, and through the promotion of intellectual exchange and understanding between Japan and the UK as the founding director of the Nissan Institute of Japanese Studies at the University of Oxford." In 2019, Stockwin received an Honorary Doctorate from the Australian National University. In 2023, St Antony’s College established the Arthur Stockwin Scholar’s Fund to support students doing fieldwork and research in Japan.

== Selected publications ==
- The Japanese Socialist Party and Neutralism (1968)
- Governing Japan (1975, 1982, 1989, 2008)
- Dynamic and Immobilist Politics in Japan (editor and part-author, 1988)
- Dictionary of the Modern Politics of Japan (2003)
- The Writings of J.A.A. Stockwin (2 vols., 2012)
- Rethinking Japan: The Politics of Contested Nationalism (2017)
- Towards Japan: A Personal Journey (2020)
- The Failure of Political Opposition in Japan: Implications for Democracy and a Vision of the Future (2023)
