= Haruhiko Nishi =

Japanese diplomat

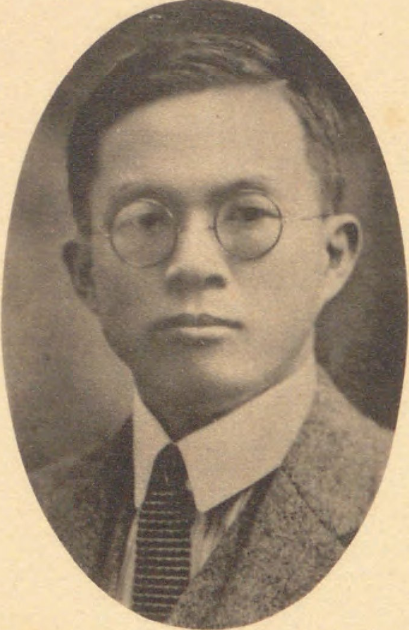

Haruhiko Nishi (西 春彦, Nishi Haruhiko; April 29, 1893 in Kagoshima Prefecture – September 20, 1986) was a Japanese diplomat.

== Prewar service ==
In 1925, as diplomatic relations between the Soviet and the Japanese governments were established, was appointed Secretary of the Embassy in Moscow. Served as Counselor of the Embassy in Moscow from June 1939 to August 1940.

== Wartime service ==
Nishi served as Japanese Vice-Minister for Foreign Affairs in 1941, at the time of the attack on Pearl Harbor. Available evidence shows that he was not notified in advance about the intention to launch the attack, and on the morning of December 8, 1941, heard about it over the radio. He resigned his position as vice-minister on September 2, 1942, following the resignation of Foreign Minister Shigenori Togo.

== After the war ==
During the Tokyo War Crimes Trial at the International Military Tribunal for the Far East in 1946-1948, he served as defence counsel to some of the Japanese war criminals. He served as first postwar Japanese ambassador to Australia in 1952-1955. As ambassador, he attended the memorial service for ANZAC in April 1953, and no protests were made against his presence.

He served as Ambassador to the UK in 1955-1957.

Nishi's granddaughter Eiko Todo (1953-) is the founder of the Japan Dyslexic Society, which she did after finding out that her son had that problem. Japanese artist Akito Nishi is one of his descendants.

== His legacy ==
Today, Haruhiko Nishi is esteemed in Australian academic circles, and an annual Crawford-Nishi lecture at Australian National University was started in 2009.
